= List of Kamen Rider Drive characters =

Select cast members of Kamen Rider Drive. From left to right: * Back: Chase, Heart, and Brain. * Front: Jun Honganji, Shinnosuke Tomari, and Kiriko Shijima.

Kamen Rider Drive (仮面ライダードライブ, Kamen Raidā Doraibu) is a Japanese tokusatsu series that serves as the 25th installment in the Kamen Rider franchise and the 16th entry in the Heisei era. The series follows police officer Shinnosuke Tomari after he is chosen by an advanced artificial intelligence called Mr. Belt to become the titular Kamen Rider Drive to battle the Roidmudes, androids that wish to usurp humanity as the dominant species on Earth through their ability to slow the passage of time.

== Main characters ==
=== Shinnosuke Tomari ===
Shinnosuke Tomari (泊 進ノ介, Tomari Shin'nosuke) is a detective of the Metropolitan Police's First Investigation Division who seeks to solve the mystery behind his father Eisuke's death. Prior to the series, amidst the "Global Freeze", Shinnosuke accidentally shot his partner, Akira Hayase, who was left critically injured. Upon hearing of this, the former lost all motivation to be a police officer and was transferred to the Special Investigations Division. After encountering Mr. Belt, Shinnosuke secretly becomes Kamen Rider Drive to combat the Roidmudes, who caused the Global Freeze. Following the Roidmudes' defeat and the Special Investigations Division's disbandment, Shinnosuke is promoted to police sergeant and transferred back to the First Investigation Division. As of the crossover films Kamen Rider × Kamen Rider Ghost & Drive: Super Movie War Genesis and Kamen Rider Heisei Generations: Dr. Pac-Man vs. Ex-Aid & Ghost with Legend Rider and the V-Cinema Drive Saga: Kamen Rider Mach, Shinnosuke goes on to marry his Special Investigations partner, Kiriko Shijima, and have a son named Eiji.

Utilizing the Shift Speed Car in conjunction with the Drive Driver (ドライブドライバー, Doraibu Doraibā) belt and the Shift Brace (シフトブレス, Shifuto Buresu), Shinnosuke can transform into Kamen Rider Drive Type Speed (タイプスピード, Taipu Supīdo). While transformed, he gains superhuman speed. He also wields the Handle-Ken (ハンドル剣, Handoru Ken; Steering Wheel Sword) and the Door-Ju (ドア銃, Doa Jū; Door Gun). His personal vehicle is the Tridoron (トライドロン, Toraidoron) sports car, which can be reconfigured into alternate dune buggy and garbage truck modes as well as combine with a pair of Ride Booster (ライドブースター, Raido Būsutā) go-karts to form the Booster Tridoron (ブースタートライドロン, Būsutā Toraidoron) hovercraft. Additionally, he can use other Shift Cars to either perform a Tire Exchange (タイヤ交換, Taiya Kōkan) technique and gain unique abilities or assume varying Type (タイプ, Taipu) forms, which are as follows:

- Type Wild (タイプワイルド, Taipu Wairudo): An auxiliary form accessed from the Shift Wild Car that grants superhuman strength. In this form, Shinnosuke primarily wields the Handle-Ken.
- Type Technic (タイプテクニック, Taipu Tekunikku): An auxiliary form accessed from the Shift Technic Car that grants superhuman intelligence. In this form, Shinnosuke primarily wields the Door-Ju.
- Type Dead Heat (タイプデッドヒート, Taipu Deddo Hīto): An upgrade form accessed from the Shift Dead Heat Shift Car that grants the ability to emulate Heart's Dead Zone at the risk of losing control and limited immunity to Super Heavy Acceleration fields. While using the Mach Driver Honoh to assume this form, Shinnosuke is referred to as Kamen Rider Dead Heat Drive (仮面ライダーデッドヒートドライブ, Kamen Raidā Deddo Hīto Doraibu).
- Type Formula (タイプフォーミュラ, Taipu Fōmyura): Shinnosuke's super form accessed from the Shift Formula Car that grants aerokinesis, superhuman speed, and immunity to Super Heavy Acceleration fields. In this form, he wields the Trailer-Hou (トレーラー砲, Torērā Hō; Trailer Cannon), which can switch between its vehicle-like Trailer Mode (トレーラーモード, Torērā Mōdo) and its rifle-like Cannon Mode (大砲モード, Taihō Mōdo). However, prolonged use of this form puts Shinnosuke at risk of mechanical shock. Because of this, he requires the use of three pit crew equipment-themed Tire Exchange Shift Cars to repair his transformation whenever it is damaged.
- Type Tridoron (タイプトライドロン, Taipu Toraidoron): Shinnosuke's final form accessed from the Shift Tridoron Car that fuses him with the Tridoron to grant the use of the Tire Blending (タイヤカキマゼール, Taiya Kakimazēru) ability to fuse three Tire Exchange Shift Cars of a particular set into a singular one with their combined powers. If necessary, Mr. Belt can assume control of the form.
- Type Fruits (タイプフルーツ, Taipu Furūtsu): A special form accessed from the Shift Fruits Car that grants proficiency in sword fighting. In this form, Shinnosuke wields Kamen Rider Gaim's Musou Saber and Daidaimaru. This form appears exclusively in the crossover film Kamen Rider × Kamen Rider Drive & Gaim: Movie War Full Throttle.
- Type High Speed (タイプハイスピード, Taipu Hai Supīdo): A special form accessed from the Shift High Speed Car that grants similar capabilities as Shinnosuke's Type Speed. This form appears exclusively in the Hyper Battle DVD special Type High Speed! The True Power! Type High Speed Is Born!.
- Type Special (タイプスペシャル, Taipu Supesharu): A fusion form between the present and future Kamen Rider Drives accessed from the Shift Next Special Car's dark blue-colored Special (スペシャル, Supesharu) half that allows the former to use his descendant's powers. This form appears exclusively in the film Kamen Rider Drive: Surprise Future.

Additionally, Shinnosuke can transform into the following variations of his Rider form:

- Kamen Rider Super Dead Heat Drive (仮面ライダー超デッドヒートドライブ, Kamen Raidā Chō Deddo Hīto Doraibu): A special form accessed from the Tridoron Key (トライドロンキー, Toraidoron Kī), which can control the Tridoron and serves as a backup for Mr. Belt's consciousness, in conjunction with the Mach Driver Honoh that grants similar capabilities as Shinnosuke's Type Dead Heat. This form appears exclusively in the film Kamen Rider Drive: Surprise Future.
- Kamen Rider Zero Drive (仮面ライダーゼロドライブ, Kamen Raidā Zero Doraibu): A prototypical version of Kamen Rider Proto Drive accessed from the Shift Speed Prototype Car in conjunction with past versions of the Drive Driver and Shift Brace that grants half of the present Kamen Rider Drive's capabilities. This form appears exclusively in the crossover film Kamen Rider × Kamen Rider Ghost & Drive: Super Movie War Genesis.

Shinnosuke Tomari is portrayed by Ryoma Takeuchi (竹内 涼真, Takeuchi Ryōma). As a child, Shinnosuke is portrayed by Ryohei Aoki (青木 綾平, Aoki Ryōhei).

=== Mr. Belt ===
"Mr. Belt" (ベルトさん, Beruto-san) is an artificial intelligence who was originally Krim Steinbelt (クリム・スタインベルト, Kurimu Sutainberuto), a human scientist who created the Core Driviars (コアドライビア, Koa Doraibia), the technology used in Kamen Rider Drive's Shift Cars and Tridoron as well as his colleague Tenjuro Banno's Roidmudes, who killed him and led to him uploading his consciousness into the Drive Driver. During the Global Freeze, Mr. Belt worked with Proto Zero as Kamen Rider Proto Drive to combat the Roidmudes until the latter's apparent death. In the intervening months, Mr. Belt upgraded the Drive arsenal until he is found by and chose Shinnosuke Tomari to become Kamen Rider Drive because of the officer's tendency to act first without hesitation. Mr. Belt continues to fight alongside Tomari and the Special Investigations Division until Banno and the Roidmudes are eventually defeated. Following this, Mr. Belt bids farewell to his allies before sealing himself and the Drive arsenal beneath the Kuruma Driver's License Center to prevent them from falling into the wrong hands by the series finale, though he returns twice to help Shinnosuke during the events of the crossover films Kamen Rider × Kamen Rider Ghost & Drive: Super Movie War Genesis and Kamen Rider Heisei Generations: Dr. Pac-Man vs. Ex-Aid & Ghost with Legend Rider.

Mr. Belt is voiced by Chris Peppler (クリス・ペプラー, Kurisu Pepurā), who also portrays Krim Steinbelt and serves as the series narrator.

=== Kiriko Shijima ===
Kiriko Shijima (詩島 霧子, Shijima Kiriko) is an athletic officer in the Special Investigations Division who tries to maintain a serious exterior by refusing to smile and working with mechanical precision, though she loses her composure whenever Shinnosuke points out the times she does smile and is forced to physically drag him back to work when he slacks off, often handcuffing him in the process. After being attacked by the Paint Roidmude and rescued by Kamen Rider Proto Drive during the Global Freeze, she attempts to become Kamen Rider Drive. Due to being incompatible however, she assists Shinnosuke as Drive in the field and is, as such, initially the only member of the division who is aware of his secret identity. Additionally, she was aware of her father, Tenjuro Banno's, evil despite not knowing him personally and did her best to protect her brother Go from the truth. She would later help Chase recover his memories upon learning he was Proto Drive and, following the Special Investigations Division's disbandment, join Shinnosuke in the First Investigation Division. As of the crossover films Kamen Rider × Kamen Rider Ghost & Drive: Super Movie War Genesis and Kamen Rider Heisei Generations: Dr. Pac-Man vs. Ex-Aid & Ghost with Legend Rider and the V-Cinema Drive Saga: Kamen Rider Mach, Kiriko goes on to marry Shinnosuke and have a son named Eiji.

In battle, Kiriko wears a pair of Rear Cowl Boots (リアカウルブーツ, Ria Kauru Būtsu), which grant increased leg strength.

Kiriko Shijima is portrayed by Rio Uchida (内田 理央, Uchida Rio). As a child, Kiriko is portrayed by Yui Kato (加藤 結, Katō Yui).

=== Go Shijima ===
Go Shijima (詩島 剛, Shijima Gō) is Kiriko's younger brother who lived in the United States for some time, working as a freelance photographer, before eventually returning to Japan to fight the Roidmudes as Kamen Rider Mach (仮面ライダーマッハ, Kamen Raidā Mahha). Having dedicated himself to destroying his father, Tenjuro Banno's, work, Go displays a hatred for the Roidmudes and develops a rivalry with Chase before eventually warming up to him. Upon learning Banno's consciousness is stored in Brain's tablet computer, Go pretends to betray his allies to get closer to the Roidmude leaders and rescue him while working undercover as "Mr. X" to covertly help the Special Investigations Division. After eventually rescuing Banno however, Go discovers the former used him in a plot to enact a second Global Freeze and joins forces with Chase to stop him before returning to America in the hopes of reviving Chase, becoming a famous photographer along the way.

In the tie-in novel Novel: Kamen Rider Drive: Mach Saga, Go's grudge against the Roidmudes is revealed to have stemmed from Roidmudes 017 and 018 killing his friend Ethan Woodward (イーサン・ウッドワード, Īsan Uddowādo) and Go being unable to save him. Afterward, Professor Harley Hendrickson rescued Go and prepared him to face the Roidmudes. In the present, Go develops a mutual attraction towards Reiko Nishiori due to their similar backgrounds and battles the Revenger Roidmude after the latter contributes to Reiko's father's death, seemingly destroying the monster. During the events of the V-Cinema Drive Saga: Kamen Rider Mach, Go works to find proof of Reiko's innocence after the Revenger Roidmude frames her for his crimes and permanently destroys the Roidmude, clearing her name and entering a relationship with her.

Utilizing the Signal Mach Bike in conjunction with the Mach Driver Honoh (マッハドライバー炎, Mahha Doraibā Honō; Mach Driver Flame) belt, Go can transform into Kamen Rider Mach. While transformed, he wields the Zenrin Shooter (ゼンリンシューター, Zenrin Shūtā; Front Wheel Shooter) handgun. His personal vehicles are the Ride Macher (ライドマッハー, Raido Mahhā) motorcycle and the Ride Booster Red (ライドブースターレッド, Raido Būsutā Reddo) go-kart. Similarly to Shinnosuke, most of Go's Signal Bikes allow him to perform a Signal Exchange (シグナル交換, Shigunaru Kōkan) technique and gain unique abilities while some allow him to transform into evolutions of his Rider form, such as the following:

- Kamen Rider Dead Heat Mach (仮面ライダーデッドヒートマッハ, Kamen Raidā Deddo Hīto Mahha): An upgrade form accessed from the Shift Dead Heat Shift Car that grants similar capabilities as Shinnosuke's Type Dead Heat, though Go later manages to overcome the Dead Zone's side effects.
  - Kamen Rider Super Dead Heat Mach (仮面ライダー超デッドヒートマッハ, Kamen Raidā Chō Deddo Hīto Mahha): The evolved form of Dead Heat Mach accessed from the Shift Viral Core. This form appears exclusively in the tie-in novel Novel: Kamen Rider Drive: Mach Saga.
- Kamen Rider Chaser Mach (仮面ライダーチェイサーマッハ, Kamen Raidā Cheisā Mahha): A fusion form between Kamen Riders Mach and Chaser accessed from the latter's Signal Chaser Bike that allows the former to use all of their powers and weapons at once.
  - Kamen Rider Mach Chaser (仮面ライダーマッハチェイサー, Kamen Raidā Mahha Cheisā): The evolved form of Chaser Mach accessed from the Shift Ride Crosser Car. This form appears exclusively in the V-Cinema Drive Saga: Kamen Rider Mach.

Go Shijima is portrayed by Yu Inaba (稲葉 友, Inaba Yū). As a child, Go is portrayed by Ryu Hashizume (橋爪 龍, Hashizume Ryū).

=== Chase ===
Chase (チェイス, Cheisu), also known as Roidmude 000 and Proto Zero (プロトゼロ, Puroto Zero), is a soft-spoken specially modified Roidmude created to serve as Krim Steinbelt's aide. During the Global Freeze, Chase attempted to stop the Roidmudes as Kamen Rider Proto Drive before he was captured and reprogrammed by Freeze, Heart, and Brain to work for them as their "Grim Reaper" (死神, Shinigami), Mashin Chaser, while adopting the form of traffic police officer Koichi Kano as a civilian disguise. With no recollection of his past save for a directive to protect humans, Chase is tasked with destroying rogue Roidmudes' bodies and taking their numbers so Brain can reset them, developing a rivalry with Shinnosuke in the process and slowly regaining his memories. In response to the latter, Medic reprograms Chase to protect Roidmudes instead of humans, during which he develops a separate rivalry with Go Shijima until he is eventually defeated by Shinnosuke. Presumed dead, Kiriko finds and nurses Chase back to health in return for him saving her during the Global Freeze.

Initially torn over whether to be a Roidmude or a Kamen Rider, he chooses to become the latter after Kiriko gives him the means to become Kamen Rider Chaser and attempts to become more human after learning of human emotions. Along the way, he develops an attraction towards her, though he realizes she loves Shinnosuke and continues to bear an unrequited love for her to become closer to being human. Amidst Tenjuro Banno's attempt to enact a second Global Freeze, Chase joins forces with Go to stop him, sacrificing himself in the process. Following this, Go takes Chase's Signal Chaser Bike with him to the U.S. in the hopes of reviving him someday.

Throughout the series, Chase has assumed the following forms as he rides the Ride Chaser (ライドチェイサー, Raido Cheisā) motorcycle, which can combine with the Ride Macher to form the Ride Crosser (ライドクロッサー, Raido Kurossā) car, into battle:

- Kamen Rider Proto Drive (仮面ライダープロトドライブ, Kamen Raidā Puroto Doraibu): Chase's first Rider form and the prototypical version of Kamen Rider Drive accessed from the Shift Speed Prototype Car in conjunction with the Drive Driver and Shift Brace that grants similar capabilities as his successor.
- Mashin Chaser (魔進チェイサー, Mashin Cheisā): (Note: Mashin (魔進) is made up of the kanji ma (魔, "evil" or "demonic") and shin (進, "advance" or "progress"). It is also a homophone of "machine" (マシン, mashin).) Chase's Kamen Rider-esque warrior form accessed from the Break Gunner (ブレイクガンナー, Bureiku Gannā), which can switch between Gun Mode (ガンモード, Gan Mōdo) and Break Mode (ブレイクモード, Bureiku Mōdo), that grants the use of three Chaser Viral Cores (チェイサーバイラルコア, Cheisā Bairaru Koa), which allow him to augment himself into varying Tune Chaser (武装チェイサー, Chūn Cheisā) forms.
  - Super Mashin Chaser (超魔進［マシン］チェイサー, Chō Mashin Cheisā): An evolution of Chase's Mashin Chaser form accessed from the Rhino Super (ライノスーパー, Raino Sūpā) Viral Core in conjunction with the Break Gunner that grants the use of the Rhino Strizer (ライノストライザー, Raino Sutoraizā) bayonet. This form appears exclusively in the V-Cinema Drive Saga: Kamen Rider Chaser.
- Kamen Rider Chaser (仮面ライダーチェイサー, Kamen Raidā Cheisā): Chase's second Rider form accessed from the Signal Chaser Bike in conjunction with the Mach Driver Honoh that grants similar capabilities as Kamen Rider Mach. While transformed, he wields the Shingou-Axe (シンゴウアックス, Shingō Akkusu; Signal Axe) and the Break Gunner. He can also use the Shift Speed Prototype Car to gain superhuman speed. Along with the Ride Chaser, his personal vehicle is the Ride Booster Blue (ライドブースターブルー, Raido Būsutā Burū) go-kart.

Chase is portrayed by Taiko Katono (上遠野 太洸, Katōno Taikō), who also portrays Koichi Kano, while Proto Drive is voiced by Daichi Endō (遠藤 大智, Endō Daichi) in Drive Saga: Kamen Rider Chaser.

== Recurring characters ==
=== Special Investigations Division ===
The Metropolitan Police's Special Investigations Division (警視庁特状課, Keishichō Toku-jō-ka) (Note: Toku-jō-ka (特状課) is an abbreviation for Tokushu Jōkyōka Jiken Sōsaka (特殊状況下事件捜査課).) is a separate branch of the Metropolitan Police charged with investigating Roidmude and "Heaviness"-related incidents that is based inside the Kuruma Driver's License Center (久瑠間運転免許試験場, Kuruma Unten Menkyo Shikenjō). Despite being allies of Kamen Rider Drive, few of their number are initially aware of his secret identity until he is forced to expose it later in the series. Following the Roidmudes' destruction, the Special Investigations Division is disbanded in the series finale, but is revived two years later during the events of the tie-in novel Novel: Kamen Rider Drive: Mach Saga and the V-Cinema Drive Saga: Kamen Rider Mach.

==== Jun Honganji ====
Jun Honganji (本願寺 純, Honganji Jun) is the Chief of the Special Investigations Division who comes off as an incompetent and goofy management level employee more concerned with pleasing his superiors and keeping an eye on his subordinates to ensure they stay out of trouble, but is secretly an astute and perceptive officer. An avid believer in divination and fortune-telling, he also has a tendency to wear an appropriately colored tie based on the day's lucky color. Later in the series, Honganji reveals he was always aware of Shinnosuke's activities as Kamen Rider Drive, a longtime friend of Krim Steinbelt's, and that he personally established and maintained the Special Investigations Division to support Drive. Additionally, his apparent sycophancy was a front for him to find information on the Global Freeze from the police force's upper levels. Following the Special Investigations Division's disbandment, Honganji eventually rises through the ranks to become the Deputy Superintendent General of the Metropolitan Police Department.

In an alternate timeline depicted in the film Super Hero Taisen GP: Kamen Rider 3, Honganji continues to lead the Special Investigations Division with Rinna Sawagami and Kyu Saijo, being one of the few people who are largely immune to Shocker's changes to the timeline. After learning of what happened, he keeps Kamen Rider Black safe until he is killed by Cheetahkatatsumuri.

Jun Honganji is portrayed by Tsurutaro Kataoka (片岡 鶴太郎, Kataoka Tsurutarō).

==== Rinna Sawagami ====
Rinna Sawagami (沢神 りんな, Sawagami Rinna) is the Special Investigations Division's visiting electro-physicist who is in charge of engineering. Though she displays anxiety about her situation, her bright personality still brings up her teammates' spirits. Later in the series, she is revealed to be the engineer behind most of Shinnosuke's arsenal and aware of his and Mr. Belt's work. Following the Special Investigations Division's disbandment, she returns to academia, becomes an expert in electro-physics, and is awarded the Nobel Prize in Physics.

Rinna Sawagami is portrayed by Rei Yoshii (吉井 怜, Yoshii Rei).

==== Kyu Saijo ====
Kenta Imai (今井 健太, Imai Kenta), also known as Kyu Saijo (西城 究, Saijō Kyū), (Note: His name is a pun on the Japanese word saijōkyū (最上級, "superior").) is the Special Investigations Division's visiting network engineer and resident electronic networks expert who often serves as an information gatherer. Due to his obsessive personality, he also displays an intense fascination towards the topics the Special Investigations Division covers, such as the occult. Following the division's disbandment, Saijo becomes a popular network researcher and author, with his novel Mechanical Friendship (機械じかけの友情, Kikai-jikake no Yūjō) becoming a best seller.

Kyu Saijo is portrayed by Kenta Hamano (浜野 謙太, Hamano Kenta).

==== Genpachiro Otta ====
Genpachiro Otta (追田 現八郎, Otta Genpachirō) is a lieutenant in the Metropolitan Police's First Investigation Division (捜査一課, Sōsaikka), the first group to be sent out to investigate crimes, and liaison between his group and the Special Investigations Division. Despite dismissing the latter group as an "occult club", he is quite fond of Shinnosuke, which he tries to hide. Following the Special Investigations Division's disbandment, Otta is promoted to police inspector for, later chief of, the First Investigation Division.

In an alternate timeline depicted in the crossover film Super Hero Taisen GP: Kamen Rider 3, Otta became a Shocker general and the monstrous Cheetahkatatsumuri (チーターカタツムリ, Chītā Katatsumuri; Cheetah Snail) before he is killed by Kamen Riders 1, 2, and 3.

Genpachiro Otta is portrayed by Taira Imata (井俣 太良, Imata Taira).

=== Shift Cars ===
The Shift Cars (シフトカー, Shifuto Kā) are a series of automobile-like devices used by Kamen Rider Drive to access his powers.

- Shift Speed (シフトスピード, Shifuto Supīdo): A sports car-themed Shift Car.
  - Max Flare (マックスフレア, Makkusu Furea): A hot rod/flame-themed Shift Car.
  - Funky Spike (ファンキースパイク, Fankī Supaiku): A hot rod/spike strip-themed Shift Car.
  - Midnight Shadow (ミッドナイトシャドー, Middonaito Shadō): A hot rod/ninja-themed Shift Car.
  - Justice Hunter (ジャスティスハンター, Jasutisu Hantā): A police car-themed Shift Car.
  - Dream Vegas (ドリームベガス, Dorīmu Begasu): A limousine-themed Shift Car.
  - Dimension Cab (ディメンションキャブ): A taxi-themed Shift Car.
- Shift Wild (シフトワイルド, Shifuto Wairudo): A dune buggy-themed Shift Car.
  - Massive Monster (マッシブモンスター, Mashibu Monsutā): A monster truck-themed Shift Car.
  - Rumble Dump (ランブルダンプ, Ranburu Danpu): A dump truck-themed Shift Car.
  - Mad Doctor (マッドドクター, Maddo Dokutā): An ambulance-themed Shift Car.
  - Hooking Wrecker (フッキングレッカー, Fukkingu Rekkā): A tow truck-themed Shift Car.
  - Burning Solar (バーニングソーラー, Bānningu Sōrā): A solar car-themed Shift Car.
  - Colorful Commercial (カラフルコマーシャル, Karafuru Komāsharu): A mobile billboard-themed Shift Car.
- Shift Technic (シフトテクニック, Shifuto Tekunikku): A garbage truck-themed Shift Car.
  - Spin Mixer (スピンミキサー, Supin Mikisā): A concrete mixer truck-themed Shift Car.
  - Fire Braver (ファイヤーブレイバー, Faiyā Bureibā): A fire engine-themed Shift Car.
  - Rolling Gravity (ローリングラビティ, Rōrin Gurabiti): A road roller-themed Shift Car.
  - Deco Traveller (デコトラベラー, Deko Toraberā): A dekotora-themed Shift Car.
  - Road Winter (ロードウィンター, Rōdo Wintā): An ice resurfacer-themed Shift Car.
  - Amazing Circus (アメージングサーカス, Amējingu Sākasu): A travelling circus-themed Shift Car.
- Shift Dead Heat (シフトデッドヒート, Shifuto Deddo Hīto): A motorcycle/sidecar-themed Shift Car.
- Shift Formula (シフトフォーミュラ, Shifuto Fōmyura): A Formula One car-themed Shift Car.
  - Mantarn F01 (マンターンF０１, Mantān Efu Zero Wan): A fuel pump-themed Shift Car.
  - Jacky F02 (ジャッキーF０２, Jakkī Efu Zero Tsū): A floor jack-themed Shift Car.
  - Sparner F03 (スパーナF０３, Supāna Efu Zero Surī): A wrench-themed Shift Car.
- Shift Tridoron (シフトトライドロン, Shifuto Toraidoron): A namesake-themed Shift Car.
  - Attack 1.2.3 (アタック１.２.３, Atakku Wan Tsū Surī): A fusion of Max Flare, Funky Spike, and Midnight Shadow.
  - People Saver (ピーポーセーバー, Pīpō Sēbā): An emergency service-themed fusion of Justice Hunter, Mad Doctor, and Fire Braver.
  - Kouji Genbar (コウジゲンバー, Kōji Genbā): A construction-themed fusion of Rumble Dump, Spin Mixer, and Rolling Gravity.
- Shift Speed Prototype (シフトスピードプロトタイプ, Shifuto Supīdo Purototaipu): A concept car-themed Shift Car.

==== Other Shift Cars ====
- Shift Fruits (シフトフルーツ, Shifuto Furūtsu): An orange-themed Shift Car that appears exclusively in the crossover film Kamen Rider × Kamen Rider Drive & Gaim: Movie War Full Throttle.
- Shift High Speed (シフトハイスピード, Shifuto Hai Supīdo): A luxury car-themed Shift Car that appears exclusively in the Hyper Battle DVD special Type High Speed! The True Power! Type High Speed Is Born!.
  - Mega Max Flare (メガマックスフレア, Mega Makkusu Furea): A hot rod/fire-themed Shift Car that appears exclusively in the Hyper Battle DVD special Type High Speed! The True Power! Type High Speed Is Born!.
- Shift Next Special (シフトネクストスペシャル, Shifuto Nekusuto Supesharu): A two-in-one futuristic car-themed Shift Car that appears exclusively in the film Kamen Rider Drive: Surprise Future.
- Shift Viral Core (シフトバイラルコア, Shifuto Bairaru Koa): A Mashin Chaser-themed Shift Car that appears exclusively in the tie-in novel Novel: Kamen Rider Drive: Mach Saga.
- Shift Heartron (シフトハートロン, Shifuto Hātoron): A Heart Roidmude-themed Shift Car that appears exclusively in the V-Cinema Drive Saga: Kamen Rider Heart.
- Shift Ride Crosser (シフトライドクロッサー, Shifuto Raido Kurossā): A namesake-themed Shift Car that appears exclusively in the V-Cinema Drive Saga: Kamen Rider Mach.

=== Signal Bikes ===
The Signal Bikes (シグナルバイク, Shigunaru Baiku) are a series of motorcycle-like devices used by Kamen Riders Mach and Chaser to access their powers.

- Signal Mach (シグナルマッハ, Shigunaru Mahha): A Ride Macher-themed Signal Bike.
  - Signal Magarl (シグナルマガール, Shigunaru Magāru): A dirt bike-themed Signal Bike.
  - Signal Kikern (シグナルキケーン, Shigunaru Kikēn): A custom bike-themed Signal Bike.
  - Signal Tomarle (シグナルトマーレ, Shigunaru Tomāre): A sports bike-themed Signal Bike.
  - Signal Kaksarn (シグナルカクサーン, Shigunaru Kakusān): A cruiser-themed Signal Bike.
- Signal Chaser (シグナルチェイサー, Shigunaru Cheisā): A Ride Chaser-themed Signal Bike.

==== Other Signal Bikes ====
- Signal Legend Faiz (シグナルレジェンドファイズ, Shigunaru Rejendo Faizu): An Auto Vajin-themed Signal Bike that appears exclusively in the crossover film Super Hero Taisen GP: Kamen Rider 3 and the web series D-Video Special: Kamen Rider 4.

=== Roidmudes ===
The Roidmudes (ロイミュード, Roimyūdo) are 108 androids that wish to usurp humanity as Earth's dominant species. Designed by Professor Tenjuro Banno as life forms capable of evolving like and mimicking humans 15 years prior to the series, his friend and colleague, Krim Steinbelt unwittingly provided him with prototype Core Driviars to complete their development. Following their activation six months prior to the series, the Roidmudes launched a full-scale attack on Northeastern Asia in an event called the Global Freeze (グローバルフリーズ, Gurōbaru Furīzu). In the present, the Roidmudes operate in the shadows to pursue varying individual agendas, create four Over-Evolved Roidmudes, and find the "Promised Number" even as their numbers are reduced by Kamen Riders Drive, Mach, and Chaser, among others. If a Roidmude works against their plan, the leading members will have the dissenter's body destroyed so their Core can be reset back into line. Upon learning of Banno's plot to sacrifice four of them to the Sigma Circular to instigate a second Global Freeze across the rest of the world, several of the Roidmudes help the Riders thwart him, resulting in most of the androids' destruction.

Roidmudes possess the ability to produce Heavy Acceleration (重加速, Jūkasoku) fields, which is colloquially referred to as "Heaviness" (どんより, Don'yori) and drastically decelerates everything around them, with victims caught in the fields describing it as the sudden physical sensation of slowed time. To sustain, empower, and evolve themselves, the Roidmudes use devices called Viral Cores (バイラルコア, Bairaru Koa). All Roidmudes possess a Core (コア, Koa), which contains their essence, and start out as Plain Roidmudes (プレーンロイミュード, Purēn Roimyūdo), which are divided between the following variations: Cobra-Types (コブラ型, Kobura-gata), which possess superhuman strength; Spider-Types (スパイダー型, Supaidā-gata), which can cling to walls and ceilings as well as produce spider silk; and flight-capable Bat-Types (バット型, Batto-gata). As long as their core remains intact, the Roidmudes can survive losing a physical body and revive themselves with a Viral Core.

If Plain Roidmudes copy the appearances and memories of a particular target and gain enough information, they can evolve into Advanced Roidmudes (上級ロイミュード, Jōkyū Roimyūdo), gaining a distinct personality reflecting their new individualized form and the ability to spread their Heavy Acceleration fields across multiple city blocks. If they absorb multiple Viral Cores at once, they can transform into Giant Roidmudes (巨大ロイミュード, Kyodai Roimyūdo), which resembles their base Viral Core.

Following Chase's defection, Freeze develops Neo Viral Cores (ネオバイラルコア, Neo Bairaru Koa), which allow Roidmudes to fuse with a human and instantly assume a red-colored Fusion Evolved Form (融合進化態, Yūgō Shinkatai) via symbiosis. If a Roidmude forms a connection with a particular emotion and exceeds a certain limit, they can evolve into a gold-colored Over-Evolved Form (超進化態, Chō Shinkatai).

==== Heart ====
The Heart Roidmude (ハートロイミュード, Hāto Roimyūdo), also known simply as Heart (ハート, Hāto) and formerly known as Roidmude 002 (ロイミュード002, Roimyūdo Zero Zero Ni), is a jovial and hedonistic yet imposing namesake-themed Spider-Type Roidmude and the field leader of the Roidmude forces stationed in Japan. He refers to his fellow Roidmudes as his friends, desires a worthy opponent to fight, and can assume the human guise of Shinzo Hiroi (広井 真蔵, Hiroi Shinzō), a businessman who refused to invest in Heart's creator, Tenjuro Banno's, research. Years prior to the series, he was tortured by Banno before eventually joining Freeze and Brain in killing him and Krim Steinbelt, though Heart was left with a hatred for humanity.

In the present, Heart finds his rival in Shinnosuke Tomari, admiring his strength and honor, and uses this to achieve his Over-Evolved form. After learning Banno survived, Heart breaks off from his fellow Roidmudes to focus on killing him permanently, to the detriment of all else and refusing to forgive humanity as a result. However, he is forced to work with Banno after the latter takes Medic and a member of the Grim Reaper Unit hostage. When Brain sacrifices himself to save Medic, Heart helps the Kamen Riders defeat Banno and destroy the Sigma Circular. However, he still refuses to let go of his grudge about coexistence and tries to attack Shinnosuke, only to succumb to his injuries by the Sigma Circular. Nonetheless, he apologizes for everything and finally lets his grudge go before dying in peace.

Two years later, during the events of the V-Cinema Drive Saga: Kamen Rider Heart, Heart is revived by Go Shijima, Rinna Sawagami, and Kyu Saijo, who intended to revive Chase, with Brain and Medic's Cores within him. After learning of Roidmude 5886 attacking the various human templates the Roidmudes mimicked or fused with and seeking redemption for his and his kind's crimes, Heart volunteers to help stop it, but is unable to regain the full potential of his former Roidmude power. Instead, he uses the Shift Heartron Car in conjunction with copies of the Drive Driver and Shift Brace to transform into Kamen Rider Heart (仮面ライダーハート, Kamen Raidā Hāto) and combine his power with Brain and Medic's in order to defeat 5886, though their Cores are overloaded and they are destroyed once more. Despite this, a changed Heart dies believing humans and Roidmudes can coexist.

In his Roidmude form, Heart can strengthen himself via joy as his emotional catalyst and possesses heat absorption capabilities, the ability to adapt to opponents' power and strategies once he has fought them once, the ability to grow stronger over time, illusion casting, and an ability called the Dead Zone (デッドゾーン, Deddo Zōn), which grants uncontrollable overwhelming combat capability and the ability to generate energy blasts, though it will cause him to explode over time and damage him. After Medic modifies him, he gains the ability to generate a Super Heavy Acceleration (超重加速, Chō Jūkasouku) field, which freezes everything within its vicinity, such as humans and the Kamen Riders in their basic forms.

As Kamen Rider Heart, he initially assumed the mismatched, hastily made Type Speed Wild Technic (タイプスピードワイルドテクニック, Taipu Supīdo Wairudo Tekunikku) form due to Brain's compiled data on their battles with Shinnosuke. After regaining his Roidmude power, Heart is able to assume his true form, Type Miracle (タイプミラクル, Taipu Mirakuru), which grants the use of the Viral Blending (バイラルカキマゼール, Bairaru Kakimazēru) ability to combine his, Brain, and Medic's powers.

Heart is portrayed by Tomoya Warabino (蕨野 友也, Warabino Tomoya).

==== Brain ====
The Brain Roidmude (ブレンロイミュード, Buren Roimyūdo), also known simply as Brain (ブレン, Buren) and formerly known as Roidmude 003 (ロイミュード003, Roimyūdo Zero Zero San), is a cold, arrogant, calculating, and stoic namesake-themed Bat-Type Roidmude who is responsible for collecting and managing information on their kind, resetting rogue members, and serving as Heart's advisor. Detesting chaos and unruly behavior, even amongst his comrades, he is easily irritated by the brash and disorderly Advanced Roidmudes and the idea that they seem to be the most powerful. Additionally, he sees the Kamen Riders as a threat to the Roidmudes' goal. Initially assuming the identity of the intelligence agency's programming deputy director Mitsuharu Kineta (杵田 光晴, Kineta Mitsuharu) after escaping into cyberspace during the Global Freeze, Brain later assumes the alias of Sou Noumi (能見 壮, Nōmi Sō), (Note: Nōmi Sō (能見 壮) is a pun on the Japanese word nō miso (脳みそ, "brain").) a consultant from a Paranormal Science Institute, to help Freeze hinder the Special Investigations Division's efforts to stop the Roidmudes and get Shinnosuke Tomari suspended from the police force.

Following Freeze's death, Brain uses a Neo Viral Core to fuse with Mitsuhide Nira, who was envious of Shinnosuke's father, Eisuke Tomari, to achieve his Over-Evolved form. However, the Roidmude is defeated by Kamen Riders Drive, Mach, and Chaser and subsequently tortured by Medic for his failure. After witnessing Tenjuro Banno's return as Gold Drive and warning Heart of Medic being under Banno's control, Brain goes into hiding to prevent himself from being used in Banno's plot to enact a second Global Freeze, leading to Brain entering the Special Investigations Division's protective custody. Ultimately, Brain chooses to help Heart save Medic by sacrificing himself to power Banno's Sigma Circular in her place.

During the events of the V-Cinema Drive Saga: Kamen Rider Brain, Go Shijima reconstitutes Brain, Heart, and Medic's consciousnesses while attempting to revive Chase. Following this, Brain dreams of becoming Kamen Rider Brain (仮面ライダーブレン, Kamen Raidā Buren) via the Brain Driver (ブレンドライバー, Buren Doraibā) belt and fighting the Mu (無) organization to prevent them from wiping out individuality on Earth.

During the events of the web series Kamen Rider Outsiders, Brain is revived by Foundation X as a Humagear.

In his Roidmude form, Brain can attack a target's nervous system via a powerful neurotoxin, hack technology by tapping his glasses, and strengthen himself via envy as his emotional catalyst. Additionally, he used a tablet to keep track of the Roidmudes, though he was unaware of Banno's consciousness being within it until the mad scientist became Gold Drive. In his Over-Evolved form, Brain possesses ESP, the use of psionic attacks, poisonous tentacles, and data manipulation. As Kamen Rider Brain, he retains his Roidmude powers while gaining the use of the Brain Megane Blade (ブレンメガネブレード, Buren Megane Burēdo) sword and the Ride Braiser (ライドブレイザー, Raido Bureizā) motorcycle. He can also perform the Rider Poison Hands (ライダー毒手, Raidā Dokushu) and Poison Handkerchiefs (ポイズンハンカチーフ, Poizun Hankachīfu) attacks, which allow him to secrete 999 types of toxicants, and the Brain Head Crusher (ブレンヘッドクラッシャー, Buren Heddo Kurasshā) Full Throttle.

Brain is portrayed by Shota Matsushima (松島 庄汰, Matsushima Shōta).

==== Medic ====
The Medic Roidmude (メディックロイミュード, Medikku Roimyūdo), also known simply as Medic (メディック, Medikku) and formerly known as Roidmude 009 (ロイミュード009, Roimyūdo Zero Zero Kyū), is a heartless namesake-themed Cobra-Type Roidmude who assumed the form of Misuzu Hatori (羽鳥 美鈴, Hatori Misuzu), a human ballerina who was left hospitalized, paralyzed, and amnesiac following a car crash. While taking part in the Global Freeze, Medic found and nursed an injured Heart back to health, but entered a catatonic state when the event ended.

In the present, Volt gives his life to contribute to Medic's revival, allowing her to help Heart and Brain achieve their Over-evolved forms, reprogram Chase to become the Roidmudes' defender after he slowly regains his memories as Proto Zero, and create the Grim Reaper Unit to take his place in helping Brain reset rogue Roidmudes. Despite taking on Hatori's kindness, Medic's emotions became twisted as a result of synchronizing with other Roidmudes, which manifests as her alternating between nurse/ballerina-inspired attire and Gothic Lolita-inspired attire in her human form based on whether Hatori's kindness or the other Roidmudes' collective minds hold the most influence on her. After Tenjuro Banno resurfaces as Gold Drive, he manipulates Medic into facilitating his scheme to enact a second Global Freeze, though her loyalty to Heart causes her to achieve her Over-Evolved form. Banno reprograms her to obey him instead so he can use her to power his Sigma Circular. However, Brain sacrifices himself to save her, causing her to regain her memories and rejoin Heart to stop Banno before she is destroyed by the Sigma Circular.

In combat, Medic can use feelings of devotion to strengthen herself, produce healing energy from her hands, which has the side effect of causing her to absorb targets' emotions, absorb Roidmudes' Cores for transportation purposes, teleport, alter other Roidmudes' programming, produce scalpel-tipped tentacles from her shoulders in both her human and Roidmude forms capable of penetrating Roidmudes' bodies and destroying their Cores, fire a scalpel beam, produce human clones, and enhanced vision. In her Over-Evolved form, she possesses aero- and ergokinesis and superhuman strength.

Medic is portrayed by Fumika Baba (馬場 ふみか, Baba Fumika).

==== Freeze ====
The Freeze Roidmude (フリーズロイミュード, Furīzu Roimyūdo), also known simply as Freeze (フリーズ, Furīzu) and formerly known as Roidmude 001 (ロイミュード001, Roimyūdo Zero Zero Ichi), is an ice/snow-themed Cobra-Type Roidmude, the leader of the Roidmude forces, and one of Tenjuro Banno's earliest creations who joined Heart and Brain in killing Banno and Krim Steinbelt before causing the Global Freeze. Not long afterwards, Freeze assumed the form of Soichi Makage (真影 壮一, Makage Sōichi), secretary of the National Bureau of Defense (国家防衛局, Kokka Bōeikyoku), to watch over the police force and evolved into his Advanced form.

In the present, he creates Neo Viral Cores to bolster the Roidmudes in their fight against the Kamen Riders and fights to personally remove Shinnosuke Tomari from the police force while using him to complete his evolution. While Freeze succeeds in attaining his Over-Evolved form using humiliation as his emotional catalyst and killing Shinnosuke, the latter's allies revive him so he can destroy Freeze in retaliation for seemingly killing his father, Eisuke Tomari, though Freeze reveals it was Mitsuhide Nira instead before he dies.

In his Advanced form, Freeze possesses cryokinesis and the ability to produce snowflakes capable of suppressing memories, though Eisuke proved immune. Additionally, he is capable of producing the strongest Heavy Acceleration field, even in his original form. In his Over-Evolved form, Freeze can fly, generate snowstorms, and produce energy blasts and shields.

Freeze is portrayed by Masami Horiuchi (堀内 正美, Horiuchi Masami).

==== Roidmude 004 ====
Roidmude 004 (ロイミュード004, Roimyūdo Zero Zero Yon) is a Spider-Type Roidmude and Tenjuro Banno's right-hand man who copied Krim Steinbelt's appearance before the Global Freeze, though 004's mind became corrupted and he was deactivated. In the present, Banno reactivates 004 to serve as his subordinate and pose as a future version of Steinbelt who became the ruler of a Roidmude dominant Earth. After being defeated in battle by Kamen Rider Drive, 004 attempts to destroy the Kamen Riders, Medic, and Heart by self-destructing, but Kamen Rider Dead Heat Mach protects them before 004 explodes.

In a possible future time period depicted in the film Kamen Rider Drive: Surprise Future, 004 planted a chip in Mr. Belt that allowed the Roidmudes to take over Earth after Shinnosuke destroyed the latter. By 2035, 004 became the leader of an army of blank Roidmudes and tasked Roidmude 108 with going back in time to ensure their future comes to pass.

Roidmude 004 is portrayed by Chris Peppler, who also portrays Krim Steinbelt and voices Mr. Belt.

==== Grim Reaper Unit ====
The Grim Reaper Unit (死神軍団, Shinigami Gundan) is a cockroach-themed division of remodeled Plain Roidmudes who serve as Medic's subordinates and wield Hell Scythes (ヘルサイス, Heru Saisu), guns, and claws. Medic creates them to take over Mashin Chaser's duty of eliminating rogue Roidmudes, destroying them completely instead of resetting them.

==== Minor Roidmudes ====
- Roidmude 029 (ロイミュード029, Roimyūdo Zero Nii Kyū): A Cobra-Type Roidmude who has a habit of picking up other people's traits, assumed the identity of Nobuo Masuda (益田 信夫, Masuda Nobuo), and sneaks into public places such as gyms and talent agencies to find ideal humans to emulate before ambushing a target to add their traits to his human guise. After being defeated by Kamen Rider Drive, Heart gives 029 a Viral Core, transforming him into the human body-themed Iron Roidmude (アイアンロイミュード, Aian Roimyūdo). In his new, upgraded body and after copying several human body parts, 029 gains the ability to stretch his arms. However, he is destroyed by Drive. Roidmude 029 is portrayed by Masafumi Yokoyama (横山 真史, Yokoyama Masafumi).
- Paint Roidmude (ペイントロイミュード, Peinto Roimyūdo): A namesake/artist-themed Spider-Type Roidmude, formerly known as Roidmude 010 (ロイミュード010, Roimyūdo Zero Ichi Zero) who possesses the ability to convert victims into colorful, paint-like data streams, fire paint-based projectiles, and extendable paint tube-like arms. During the Global Freeze, Paint attacked Kiriko Shijima as part of his desire to capture women in his paintings, but was repelled by Kamen Rider Proto Drive. In the present, Paint assumes the identity of Kazuhiro Asaya (浅矢 一広, Asaya Kazuhiro), establishes an art gallery to store all of his victims, and gains Roidmude 084's help in undergoing a mass kidnapping spree. However, Paint is eventually exposed and destroyed by Kamen Rider Drive, which restores his victims. The Paint Roidmude is portrayed by Lou Oshiba (ルー大柴, Rū Ōshiba).
  - Roidmude 084 (ロイミュード084, Roimyūdo Zero Hachi Yon): A Spider-Type Roidmude and associate of Paint's who assumes the guise of Kazuhiro Asaya's student, Hajime Fujimiya (富士宮 肇, Fujimiya Hajime) and possesses a similar version of Paint's conversion ability, though 084's streams manifest as monochrome pencil sketches. 084 assists Paint in his kidnapping spree until the former is destroyed by Kamen Rider Drive. Roidmude 084 is portrayed by Yūta Murakami (村上 雄太, Murakami Yūta).
- Crash Roidmude (クラッシュロイミュード, Kurasshu Roimyūdo): A hammer-themed Cobra-Type Roidmude, formerly known as Roidmude 023 (ロイミュード023, Roimyūdo Zero Nii San), who assumes the identity of a criminal named "Crash" and possesses large, twin arm-mounted hammers. He and his "brothers", Roidmudes 060 and 074, target the Font Earl company's armored vehicles for their explosives so they can commit a major heist. Despite Kamen Rider Drive destroying 060, Crash and 074 succeed in stealing the explosives, but are ultimately destroyed by Kamen Rider Drive and the Tridoron respectively. The Crash Roidmude is portrayed by HIRO of Yasuda Dai Circus.
  - Roidmude 060 (ロイミュード060, Roimyūdo Zero Roku Zero): A Spider-Type Roidmude and one of Crash's "brothers". 060 assists his brothers in their plot to steal explosives until he is destroyed by Kamen Rider Drive. Roidmude 060 is portrayed by Danchō Yasuda (団長安田) of Yasuda Dai Circus.
  - Roidmude 074 (ロイミュード074, Roimyūdo Zero Nana Yon): A Cobra-Type Roidmude and one of Crash's "brothers". To facilitate Crash's scheme, 074 transforms into a Giant Roidmude, but is destroyed by the Tridoron. Roidmude 074 is portrayed by Akihiro Kurokawa (黒川 明人, Kurokawa Akihiro) of Yasuda Dai Circus.
- Scooper Roidmude (スクーパーロイミュード, Sukūpā Roimyūdo): A camera-themed Bat-Type Roidmude, formerly known as Roidmude 033 (ロイミュード033, Roimyūdo Zero San San), who possesses the ability to steal metal from anything he targets, produce energy blasts, materialize objects from photos, and the ability to fire balls of light. He originally intended to assume the form of reporter, Shunsuke Kusaka (久坂 俊介, Kusaka Shunsuke), but chose instead to give him a Special Badge (特殊なバッジ, Tokushu na Bajji) to protect him from Heavy Acceleration fields while Scooper fulfills the latter's desire to see Kaishima City Construction-built buildings destroyed and have news stories to report on, absorbing Kusaka's greed to facilitate his evolution. After Kusaka's colleague, Kenta, brings in the Special Investigations Division, Scooper attempts to kill Kusaka, but is destroyed by Kamen Rider Drive. The Scooper Roidmude is voiced by Hiroshi Naka (中 博史, Naka Hiroshi) while Shunsuke Kusaka is portrayed by Takuya Nagaoka (永岡 卓也, Nagaoka Takuya).
- Volt Roidmude (ボルトロイミュード, Boruto Roimyūdo): An electricity-themed Spider-Type Roidmude, formerly known as Roidmude 024 (ロイミュード024, Roimyūdo Zero Nii Yon), who possesses electrokinesis. He assumes the guise of deceased writer Goro Minami (美波 護郎, Minami Gorō) while absorbing electricity throughout Tokyo to cause mass blackouts and revive Medic with help from Roidmudes 037 and 103. After being destroyed by Kamen Rider Drive, 103 recovers Volt's power controller, which contains a backup of the latter and causes him to manifest as Volt Ghost (ボルトゴースト, Boruto Gōsuto) in an attempt to help the Roidmudes enact a second Global Freeze. After consuming two Spider Viral Cores, he transforms further into a Giant Roidmude. However, he is reverted to his original form and destroyed by Kamen Rider Drive while his power controller is destroyed by Kiriko Shijima. The Volt Roidmude is portrayed by Isamu Ago (あご勇, Ago Isamu).
  - Roidmude 037 (ロイミュード037, Roimyūdo Zero San Nana): A Cobra-Type Roidmude and accomplice of Volt's who assists the latter in his plot to cause mass blackouts before he is destroyed by Kamen Rider Drive. Roidmude 037 is portrayed by Kenta Nitta (新田 健太, Nitta Kenta).
  - Roidmude 103 (ロイミュード103, Roimyūdo Ichi Zero San): A Bat-Type Roidmude and accomplice of Volt's who assists the latter in his plot to cause mass blackouts. After being mortally wounded by Kamen Rider Drive, 103 delivers Volt's power controller to Heart before succumbing to his injuries. Roidmude 103 is portrayed by Kazuki Tsujimoto (辻本 一樹, Tsujimoto Kazuki).
- Gunman Roidmude (ガンマンロイミュード, Ganman Roimyūdo): A cowboy-themed Bat-Type Roidmude, formerly known as Roidmude 017 (ロイミュード017, Roimyūdo Zero Ichi Nana), who wields the Emperor 17 (エンペラ17, Enpera Jūnana) handgun. He and his "little brother", Roidmude 018, come to Japan to sell Heavy Acceleration-inducing bands to humans on the black market until they are destroyed by Kamen Rider Mach. In the tie-in novel Novel: Kamen Rider Drive: Mach Saga, Gunman and 018 killed Mach's friend, Ethan Woodward, while the Roidmudes were in the U.S. as part of the American mafia. The Gunman Roidmude is portrayed by Bernard Ackah (ベルナール・アッカ, Berunāru Akka).
  - Roidmude 018 (ロイミュード018, Roimyūdo Zero Ichi Hachi): A Spider-Type Roidmude and Gunman's "little brother" who failed to fully evolve and possesses personal Heavy Acceleration bands. 018 assumes the guise of the Boss (元締め, Motojime) of the black market and assists Gunman in his scheme to sell Heavy Acceleration bands to humans before they are destroyed by Kamen Rider Mach. In the tie-in novel Novel: Kamen Rider Drive: Mach Saga, 018 and Gunman killed Mach's friend, Ethan Woodward, while the Roidmudes were in the U.S. as part of the American mafia. Roidmude 018 is portrayed by Marvin Jr. (マービンJr., Mābin Junia).
- Roidmude 069 (ロイミュード069, Roimyūdo Zero Roku Kyū): A Bat-Type Roidmude who assumed the form of makeup artist turned stalker, Koichi Sakaki (坂木 光一, Sakaki Kōichi). While stalking Rira Nanao, 069 and Sakaki are repelled by Roidmude 096 and Kamen Riders Drive and Mach. After Sakaki is arrested, Brain transforms 069 into a Giant Roidmude, but the latter is destroyed by Kamen Rider Mach and the Ride Crosser. During the events of the tie-in novel Novel: Kamen Rider Drive: Mach Saga, Roidmude 005 breaks Sakaki and five other criminals out of prison. After receiving poisonous bracelets from 005, Sakaki joins Hajime Taga in robbing a bank before they are arrested by Go Shijima and Koichi Kano and killed by their bracelets. Both Roidmude 069 and Koichi Sakaki are portrayed by Shunsuke Miura (三浦 俊輔, Miura Shunsuke).
- Roidmude 096 (ロイミュード096, Roimyūdo Zero Kyū Roku): A Bat-Type Roidmude who possesses red claws capable of putting victims into suspended animation. A year prior to the series, he appeared before famous actress Rira Nanao (七尾 リラ, Nanao Rira), who had accidentally killed her boyfriend and tarot card reader, Hiroki Nikaido (二階堂 弘樹, Nikaidō Hiroki). Absorbing her memories, 096 began impersonating Nanao herself to save her from people he deems threats to her well-being. After the Special Investigations Division discover the truth behind Nikaido's death, 096 attempts to kill them to maintain the secret, but is destroyed by Kamen Riders Drive and Mach. Roidmude 096 is voiced by an uncredited male actor while Haruka Suenaga (末永 遥, Suenaga Haruka) provides his female voice in addition to portraying Rira Nanao.
- Voice Roidmude (ボイスロイミュード, Boisu Roimyūdo): A namesake-themed Spider-Type Roidmude, formerly known as Roidmude 030 (ロイミュード030, Roimyūdo Zero San Zero), who possesses sonokinesis and the ability to produce hypnotic sound waves. He assumes the form of businessman Shu Amagi (甘城 秀, Amagi Shū), and later applied physicist Kisaburo Sasamoto (笹本 喜三郎, Sasamoto Kisaburō), to rob women of their money. He initially went under the Special Investigations Division's radar as his crimes did not produce Heavy Acceleration fields and came off as normal fraud cases until his victims developed sensitive hearing. After being exposed by Kiriko Shijima, Voice is destroyed by Kamen Rider Dead Heat Mach. The Voice Roidmude is portrayed by Hiroshi Matsunaga (松永 博史, Matsunaga Hiroshi) as Shu Amagi and Yoshihiko Narimatsu (成松 慶彦, Narimatsu Yoshihiko) as Kisaburo Sasamoto.
  - Roidmude 046 (ロイミュード046, Roimyūdo Zero Yon Roku) and Roidmude 085 (ロイミュード085, Roimyūdo Zero Hachi Go): A Spider and Cobra-Type Roidmude respectively and associates of Voice's who are destroyed by Kamen Rider Drive. Roidmudes 046 and 085 are portrayed by Yasuaki Ishii (石井 靖見, Ishii Yasuaki) and Akira Murai (村井 亮, Murai Akira) respectively.
- Judge Roidmude (ジャッジロイミュード, Jajji Roimyūdo): A namesake-themed Cobra-Type Roidmude, formerly known as Roidmude 065 (ロイミュード065, Roimyūdo Zero Roku Go), who wields the Shock Judge (ショックジャッジ, Shokku Jajji) electrodes and the Blade Judge (ブレードジャッジ, Burēdo Jajji) cattle prod. He assumes the form of retired police officer Shingo Tachibana (橘 真伍, Tachibana Shingo) to help him find a vigilante called "Judge" by attacking criminals. After his namesake is arrested, Judge attempts to kill him, only to be destroyed by Kamen Rider Drive. The Judge Roidmude is voiced by Shūhei Takubo (田久保 修平, Takubo Shūhei) while Shingo Tachibana is portrayed by Seiroku Nakazawa (中沢 青六, Nakazawa Seiroku).
- Roidmude 072 (ロイミュード072, Roimyūdo Zero Nana Ni): A Bat-Type Roidmude who assumes the form of Kyu Saijo. During New Year's, the former infiltrated his computer with the intention of killing him and taking his place in the Special Investigations Division. However, 072 honored Saijo's final request to watch his favorite anime one more time and joined him. Moved by how wonderful a human creation can be, 072 befriended Saijo and agreed to take his place at work whenever the latter becomes preoccupied with other activities. While Saijo's obsessive personality causes 072 to kidnap an idol who was meant to guest star in the anime, Shinnosuke spares 072 as the Roidmude had gained humanity like Chase did. However, Medic later kills 072. Before he dies, 072 asks Shinnosuke to tell Saijo he had been killed by the Kamen Riders because he went out of control to save Saijo from suffering an emotional breakdown. Following this, 072 would go on to inspire Saijo's novel Mechanical Friendship. Roidmude 072 is voiced by Kenta Hamano, who also portrays Kyu Saijo.
- Shoot Roidmude (シュートロイミュード, Shūto Roimyūdo): A missile launcher-themed Bat-Type Roidmude, formerly known as Roidmude 091 (ロイミュード091, Roimyūdo Zero Kyū Ichi), who can fire Blast Dart (ブラストダート, Burasuto Dāto) missiles. He assumes the form of and made a deal with high school student Takuro Mogi (茂木 拓郎, Mogi Takurō) to attack several places with bomb threats and his missiles. After being defeated by Kamen Rider Drive, Brain rescues Shoot's core and gives him a new Viral Core to grant him an upgraded body with neurotoxin-laced Blast Darts. No longer interested in him, Shoot attempts to kill Mogi, only to be destroyed by Kamen Riders Drive and Dead Heat Mach. The Shoot Roidmude is portrayed by Naoki Takeshi (武子 直輝, Takeshi Naoki).
- Sword Roidmude (ソードロイミュード, Sōdo Roimyūdo): A namesake-themed Neo Viral Core-based Bat-Type Roidmude, formerly known as Roidmude 007 (ロイミュード007, Roimyūdo Zero Zero Nana), who possesses barbed broadswords for arms and the ability to strengthen himself via vengeful feelings as his emotional catalyst. He originally fought Kamen Rider Proto Drive during the Global Freeze, during which he freed a criminal named Hajime Taga (多賀 始, Taga Hajime) to serve as his partner. In the present, Sword fuses with Taga to help him seek revenge on Akira Hayase, which leads to Kamen Rider Drive publicly revealing his secret identity. Despite being separated, Sword and Taga overwhelm Drive and Mach before attempting to kill Kiriko Shijima, only to be thwarted and separated by Kamen Rider Chaser, who destroys Sword while Taga is arrested by the Special Investigations Division. In the tie-in novel Novel: Kamen Rider Drive: Mach Saga, Roidmude 005 breaks Taga and five other criminals out of prison. After receiving poisonous bracelets from 005, Taga joins Koichi Sakaki in robbing a bank, only to be arrested by Go Shijima and Koichi Kano and killed by their bracelets. The Sword Roidmude is voiced by Takashi Ōhara (大原 崇, Ōhara Takashi) while Hajime Taga is portrayed by Mitsuyoshi Tani (谷 充義, Tani Mitsuyoshi).
- Seeker Roidmude (シーカーロイミュード, Shīkā Roimyūdo): A Mokumokuren-themed, Neo Viral Core-based Spider-Type Roidmude, formerly known as Roidmude 050 (ロイミュード050, Roimyūdo Zero Gō Zero), who wields the Blow Wand (ブロウワンド, Burō Wando). He fuses with Reiko Nishiori, daughter of incarcerated criminal psychologist Koya Nishihori, and uses her form coupled with the pseudonym Yoriko Soma (相馬 頼子, Sōma Yoriko) as part of her plot to manipulate Kamen Rider Mach into killing her and seek revenge for her father. However, Kamen Rider Drive discovers the ruse and separates Reiko from Seeker before arresting her and destroying him. The Seeker Roidmude is voiced by Kiyohito Yoshikai (吉開 清人, Yoshikai Kiyohito).
- Open Roidmude (オープンロイミュード, Ōpun Roimyūdo): A Swiss army knife/lock pick-themed, Neo Viral Core-based Cobra-Type Roidmude, formerly known as Roidmude 067 (ロイミュード067, Roimyūdo Zero Roku Nana), who wields the Common Master Key (コモンマスターキー, Komon Masutā Kī), which allows him to open anything. He fuses with Itsuro Negishi (根岸 逸郎, Negishi Itsurō), an armed robber who Mitsuhide Nira framed as Eisuke Tomari's killer, only to be separated from Negishi and destroyed by Kamen Riders Chaser and Drive while Negishi is arrested by the Special Investigations Division. In the tie-in novel Novel: Kamen Rider Drive: Mach Saga, Roidmude 005 breaks Negishi and five other criminals out of prison. Initially assisting Nira, Negishi has a change of heart and sacrifices himself to shield Yukari Karasawa from 005's army of brainwashed officers. The Open Roidmude is voiced by Yoshimasa Kawata (河田 吉正, Kawata Yoshimasa) while Itsuro Negishi is portrayed by Hiroaki Fukui (福井 博章, Fukui Hiroaki).
- Roidmude 106 (ロイミュード106, Roimyūdo Ichi Zero Roku): A Bat-Type Roidmude who assists Mitsuhide Nira in covering up evidence of him murdering Eisuke Tomari before Nira uses a Neo Viral Core to fuse them into the Thief Roidmude (シーフロイミュード, Shīfu Roimyūdo), gaining a hook for a right hand, the ability to fire energy hooks, absorb stolen objects into their body, and invisibility. After they are separated by Kamen Rider Drive, Brain transforms 106 into a Giant Roidmude, but the latter is destroyed by the Tridoron. Roidmude 106 is voiced by Anri Katsu (勝 杏里, Katsu Anri).
- Roidmude 090 (ロイミュード090, Roimyūdo Zero Kyū Zero): A Cobra-Type Roidmude tasked by Medic with completing the Honfleur's Dusk recipe to help Heart achieve his Over-Evolved form. To complete her task, 090 assumes the form of sous-chef Miho Masukawa (増川 美穂, Masukawa Miho) and fuses with chef Matsutaro Okumura (奥村 松太郎, Okumura Matsutarō) to evolve into the chef/kitchen utensil-themed Cook Roidmude (クックロイミュード, Kukku Roimyūdo), gaining right arm-mounted cutlery and an extendable tongue. Despite completing the recipe, separating from Okumura, and receiving an arm cannon from Medic, 090 is destroyed by Kamen Rider Drive. Roidmude 090 is portrayed by Momoka Ayukawa (鮎川 桃果, Ayukawa Momoka) while Matsutaro Okumura is portrayed by Sonrei Yoshioka (吉岡 そんれい, Yoshioka Sonrei).
- Tornado Roidmude (トルネードロイミュード, Torunēdo Roimyūdo): A namesake-themed Spider-Type Roidmude, formerly known as Roidmude 008 (ロイミュード008, Roimyūdo Zero Zero Hachi), who possesses aerokinesis, teleportation capabilities, self-acceleration, the ability to turn his right arm into a drill, and the ability to strengthen himself via passionate feelings as his emotional catalyst. He assumes the form of fashion designer George Shirogane (ジョージ白鐘, Jōji Shirogane) to kidnap several young women in the hopes of finding one who can help him achieve his Over-Evolved form. After claiming to have found the perfect woman in Kiriko Shijima and kidnapping her, Kamen Riders Drive and Mach join forces to rescue her and destroy Tornado. The Tornado Roidmude is portrayed by Joe Hyuga (日向 丈, Hyūga Jō).
- Roidmude 006 (ロイミュード006, Roimyūdo Zero Zero Roku): A Cobra-Type Roidmude who assumes the form of an unnamed mafia boss and is tasked by Heart with eliminating Tenjuro Banno after the latter transfers himself into the Banno Driver. Despite nearly achieving his Over-Evolved form, 006's Core is destroyed by Banno, who uses the Roidmude's body as a vessel to manifest as Gold Drive. Roidmude 006 is portrayed by Arata Matsuura (松浦 新, Matsuura Arata).

===== Other Roidmudes =====
- Roidmude 027 (ロイミュード027, Roimyūdo Zero Nii Nana): A Spider-Type Roidmude who appears exclusively in the Hyper Battle DVD special Type High Speed! The True Power! Type High Speed Is Born! He attempts to sell counterfeit Televi-Kun issues until he is discovered and confronted by Shinnosuke and Kiriko. After gathering enough data on him, 027 transforms into a counterfeit version of Kamen Rider Drive until he is destroyed by the real version. Roidmude 027 is portrayed by Tomokazu Seki (関 智一, Seki Tomokazu).
- Roidmude 089 (ロイミュード089, Roimyūdo Zero Hachi Kyū): A Spider-Type Roidmude who used the DNA of a deceased Shocker scientist named Doctor Dee (ディー博士, Dī-hakase) to assume his form, finish the latter's Dimensional Distortion Machine (空間変異装置, Kūkan Heni Sōchi), and ally himself with Kyuemon Izayoi to create the Yokai Buruburu during the events of the two-part crossover special Shuriken Sentai Ninninger vs. Kamen Rider Drive: Spring Break Combined 1 Hour Special. After Buruburu is destroyed by Kamen Rider Drive and the Ninningers, 089 uses Buruburu's Sealing Shuriken to become Shocker Buruburu (ショッカーブルブル, Shokkā Buruburu), combining his powers with Shocker's technology and fear from the Kibaoni Army Corps. However, he is destroyed by Kamen Riders Drive and Mach and the Ninningers. Roidmude 089 is portrayed by Yūji Kishi (岸 祐二, Kishi Yūji).
- Roidmude 077 (ロイミュード077, Roimyūdo Zero Nana Nana): A Bat-Type Roidmude who assumed the form of robber Toshio Miwa (三輪 利雄, Miwa Toshio) and appears exclusively in the V-Cinema Kamen Rider Drive Saga: Kamen Rider Chaser. After becoming a Gaia Memory-based criminal, 077 attempts to use the Beast Memory on himself, only to collapse on the border between the Tokyo and Fuuto prefectures and cause a conflict of jurisdictions between their respective police forces. 077 later awakens and successfully transforms into the Beast Dopant, but is destroyed by Kamen Riders Drive, Mach, and Accel. Roidmude 077 is portrayed by Mamoru Tanaka (田中 護, Tanaka Mamoru).
- Roidmude 100 (ロイミュード100, Roimyūdo Ichi Zero Zero): A Cobra-Type Roidmude and member of the Grim Reaper Unit with the ability to wield defeated Roidmudes' weapons who appears exclusively in the Hyper Battle DVD special Type Lupin! ~Lupin, the Last Challenge~. Amidst his quest to find 100 different weapons and learn 100 different fighting styles, he steals Zoruku Tojo's Lupin Gunner and poses as him, gaining the ability to summon blank Roidmudes in the process. However, Tojo regains the Lupin Gunner and joins forces with Kamen Rider Drive to destroy 100. Roidmude 100 is voiced by Kenji Takahashi (高橋 研二, Takahashi Kenji).
- Roidmude 5886 (ロイミュード5886, Roimyūdo Gō Hachi Hachi Roku): A wild and unstable Roidmude created from the merger of all 108 Roidmudes' fragmented data who appears exclusively in the V-Cinema Drive Saga: Kamen Rider Heart. He seeks to complete himself by absorbing the life-forces of the various human templates the Roidmudes copied or fused with, only to be destroyed by Kamen Rider Heart. Roidmude 5886 is voiced by Takaya Kuroda (黒田 崇矢, Kuroda Takaya).

=== Akira Hayase ===
Akira Hayase (早瀬 明, Hayase Akira) is a retired police officer and Shinnosuke's former colleague. Six months prior to the beginning of the series, they were investigating the Neo-Shade terrorist organization when the Global Freeze occurred, during which Shinnosuke accidentally hospitalized Hayase. As of the present, the latter has begun physical rehabilitation, but is unable to return to active duty. Despite what happened, Hayase does not blame Shinnosuke and pushes him to move beyond his guilt and seek new goals in life. After learning Shinnosuke is Kamen Rider Drive, Hayase secretly supports him and works with the Metropolitan Police's vehicles division to procure space and materials for a Makeshift Emergency Drive Pit. Two years later, during the events of the tie-in novel Novel: Kamen Rider Drive: Mach Saga and the V-Cinema Drive Saga: Kamen Rider Mach, Hayase has joined the newly reassembled Special Investigations Division.

Akira Hayase is portrayed by Yukihiro Takiguchi (滝口 幸広, Takiguchi Yukihiro).

=== Mitsuhide Nira ===
Mitsuhide Nira (仁良 光秀, Nira Mitsuhide) is a corrupt chief in the Metropolitan Police's First Investigation Division who works directly under Freeze as Soichi Makage, assisting him in controlling the police force and hindering the Special Investigations Division's attempts to stop the Roidmudes. Additionally, he suffers from an inferiority complex towards his partner, Eisuke Tomari, and killed him years prior while working with him to arrest Itsuro Negishi, who Nira framed for the murder.

After Freeze kills Shinnosuke and abandons him, Nira helps the Special Investigations Division revive Shinnosuke before they discover what he did. Nira uses a Neo Viral Core to fuse himself with Roidmude 106 and become the Thief Roidmude, but Shinnosuke separates them and destroys the Roidmude. Nira fuses himself with Brain and helps him achieve his Over-Evolved Form before turning the police and the public against the Special Investigations Division. However, his corruption is revealed and Brain abandons him, leading to Nira being arrested by Shinnosuke.

In the tie-in novel Novel: Kamen Rider Drive: Mach Saga, Roidmude 005 breaks Nira and five other criminals out of prison. After killing Makoto Asamura for getting himself arrested again, Nira descends into madness from being humiliated by the Tomari family over the years and joins Negishi in leading an army of officers brainwashed by 005 in an attempt to kill Yukari Karasawa. However, a reformed Negishi sacrifices himself to shield the woman, allowing Shinnosuke to arrest Nira once more.

Mitsuhide Nira is portrayed by Kisuke Iida (飯田 基祐, Iida Kisuke).

=== Eisuke Tomari ===
Eisuke Tomari (泊 英介, Tomari Eisuke) is Shinnosuke's father and an officer in the Metropolitan Police's First Investigation Division. Twelve years earlier, the former discovered Freeze's deception, but was killed by his partner and Freeze's subordinate, Mitsuhide Nira, who framed bank robber Itsuro Negishi.

Eisuke Tomari is portrayed by Tareyanagi (たれやなぎ).

=== Tenjuro Banno ===
Tenjuro Banno (蛮野 天十郎, Banno Tenjūrō) is a mad scientist, former colleague of Krim Steinbelt, and father of Kiriko and Go Shijima with a superiority complex who secretly holds a grudge against Steinbelt for creating the Core Driviars and cares little for his family, willing to treat them like slaves. Fifteen years prior to the series, Banno attempted to create an artificial life form capable of transcending humanity, but dead ends in his research drove him mad and forced him to convince Steinbelt to share the Core Driviar technology with him, which allowed Banno to create the Roidmudes. After witnessing Banno abusing a Roidmude, a horrified Steinbelt abandoned him, but Banno secretly stole his colleague's mind link technology, completed the Roidmudes on his own, and subsequently allowed them to mortally wound him so he could upload his consciousness into a computer tablet and kill Steinbelt. While the tablet wound up in Brain's possession, Banno used the Roidmudes to cause the Global Freeze.

In the present, Banno manipulates the Kamen Riders to suit his needs and Go into believing he was being held hostage by the Roidmudes before receiving Roidmude 004's help in creating an imitation of the Drive Driver called the Banno Driver (バンノドライバー, Banno Doraibā) and stealing Roidmude 006's body to house his mind and turn himself into a Kamen Rider Drive-esque Over-Evolved Roidmude. Dubbing himself Gold Drive (ゴルドドライブ, Gorudo Doraibu), (Note: Alternately referred to as Kamen Rider Gold Drive (仮面ライダーゴルドドライブ, Kamen Raidā Gorudo Doraibu) and "Gord Drive" in other media.) Banno attempts to enact a second, worldwide version of the Global Freeze by using himself and three other Roidmudes to power the Sigma Circular. However, he is eventually confronted by Go and Chase, with the latter sacrificing himself to help the former destroy Banno's body and the Banno Driver over his pleas for mercy.

During the events of the web series Kamen Rider Outsiders, Banno is revived by Foundation X as a Kamen Rider Drive-esque Humagear called Bronze Drive (ブロンズドライブ, Buronzu Doraibu) before his body is destroyed by Kamen Rider Zein.

While he was within Brain's tablet, Banno possesses the ability to manipulate data, allowing him to create constructs such as tentacles capable of delivering painful electric shocks and a shield, and heal people infected by Roidmudes. As Gold Drive, he possesses ergokinesis and the ability to steal and use the other Riders' Shift Cars, Signal Bikes, and weapons until Rinna Sawagami develops a special data coating to protect the Shift Cars and Signal Bikes.

Tenjuro Banno is portrayed by Masakazu Morita (森田 成一, Morita Masakazu).

=== Sigma Circular ===
The Sigma Circular (シグマサーキュラー, Shiguma Sākyurā) is a sentient machine created by Banno and Roidmude 004 that acts as the former's will and serves to dominate humanity and convert those that oppose Banno into data. Initially starting in an orb-like form, Banno intends to use Medic as a sacrificial power source and vessel, but Brain takes her place to save her from being brainwashed. Following this, Banno and the Grim Reaper Unit infiltrate the Special Situation Defense Center to help the Sigma Circular evolve so he can use it to enact a second Global Freeze. After the Kamen Riders, Heart, and Medic foil Banno's plans, the Sigma Circular kills a weakened Medic and saves Kiriko Shijima before it is destroyed by Kamen Rider Drive and Heart.

The Sigma Circular is voiced by Ayumi Fujimura (藤村 歩, Fujimura Ayumi) and Masakazu Morita.

== Guest characters ==
- Koya Nishihori (西堀 光也, Nishihori Kōya): A criminal psychologist pursued by Shinnosuke Tomari and Akira Hayase. During the events of the DVD special Type Zero Episode 0: Countdown to Global Freeze and episode one of the series, Koya became known as the Copycat Pirate (コピーキャットパイレート, Kopīkyatto Pairēto) due to his penchant for posing as infamous criminals and desire to blackmail the public via the internet in retaliation for his scientific reputation being ruined. Shortly before the Global Freeze, he took a hostage, but was confronted by Shinnosuke and Hayase until Roidmude 005 took Koya to use his form and data before dropping him from a building, though Kamen Rider Proto Drive rescued Koya and left him for Shinnosuke. Two years later, during the events of the tie-in novel Novel: Kamen Rider Drive: Mach Saga, Koya uses a blackout to free five prisoners the Special Investigations Division arrested. In an attempt to digitize his consciousness, Koya empowers the Anima System with humans' fear energy, but his efforts are sabotaged by 005, rendering him an empty shell. While remaining alive, he is briefly poisoned and cured despite being in cardiac arrest. Koya Nishiori is portrayed by Toru Nomaguchi (野間口 徹, Nomaguchi Tōru), who also portrays Roidmude 005.
- Professor Harley Hendrickson (ハーレー・ヘンドリクソン博士, Hārē Hendorikuson-hakase): An American scientist, the creator of the Kamen Rider Mach technology, and Krim Steinbelt's teacher. Harley Hendrickson is portrayed by Ulf Ōtsuki (大月 ウルフ, Ōtsuki Urufu).
- "Judge" (ジャッジ, Jajji): (Note: In the tie-in novel Novel: Kamen Rider Drive: Mach Saga, his real name is revealed to be Makoto Asamura (浅村 誠, Asamura Makoto).) A vigilante who took on the pseudonym So Utsugi (宇津木 壮, Utsugi Sō). While being chased by Genpachiro Otta and Shingo Tachibana, Judge framed Toma Okajima to evade capture for years until he is finally arrested by Otta when the Judge Roidmude becomes involved with his case in the present. Two years later, during the events of the tie-novel Novel: Kamen Rider Drive: Mach Saga, Roidmude 005 breaks Judge and five other prisoners out of prison, but Judge is rearrested when Otta foils his attempt to assassinate Tachibana. After being re-imprisoned, Judge is murdered by Mitsuhide Nira for his recklessness. Judge is portrayed by Takaya Aoyagi (青柳 尊哉, Aoyagi Takaya).
- Yukari Karasawa (唐沢 ゆかり, Karasawa Yukari): A high school student who Eisuke Tomari protected during Itsuro Negishi's bank robbery before she witnessed the former being murdered by Mitsuhide Nira twelve years prior. In the present, Negishi and the Open Roidmude target her because of her presence during the robbery, but Eisuke's son Shinnosuke Tomari successfully protects her. Nira and Brain later target her to prevent her from exposing the former as Eisuke's murderer, but she is saved by Tenjuro Banno. In the tie-in novel Novel: Kamen Rider Drive: Mach Saga, Negishi and Nira lead brainwashed police officers in another attempt to kill Karasawa, but Negishi has a change of heart and sacrifices himself to protect her. Yukari Karasawa is portrayed by Coco Koizumi (小泉 ここ, Koizumi Koko) as a teenager and by Sara Naito (内藤 咲愛, Naitō Sara) as a child.
- Shuriken Sentai Ninninger (手裏剣戦隊ニンニンジャー, Shuriken Sentai Ninninjā): A group of young ninjas and descendants of the Igasaki Clan, consisting of Takaharu Igasaki, Yakumo Kato, Nagi Matsuo, Fuka Igasaki, and Kasumi Momoichi, who are charged with protecting the world from the Kibaoni Army Corps. In the two-part crossover special Shuriken Sentai Ninninger vs. Kamen Rider Drive: Spring Break Combined 1 Hour Special, after learning their enemies joined forces to alter history, Drive and Mach join forces with the Ninningers to thwart them. The ninjas would later join forces with Drive to restore history once more during the events of the crossover film Super Hero Taisen GP: Kamen Rider 3. Takaharu Igasaki, Yakumo Kato, Nagi Matsuo, Fuka Igasaki, and Kasumi Momoichi are portrayed by Shunsuke Nishikawa (西川 俊介, Nishikawa Shunsuke), Gaku Matsumoto (松本 岳, Matsumoto Gaku), Kaito Nakamura (中村 嘉惟人, Nakamura Kaito), Yuuka Yano (矢野 優花, Yano Yūka), and Kasumi Yamaya (山谷 花純, Yamaya Kasumi), all of whom reprise their respective roles from Shuriken Sentai Ninninger.
- Kyoichiro Kuroi (黒井 響一郎, Kuroi Kyōichirō): A former racecar driver who sought to win by any means necessary who was kidnapped by remnants of the terrorist organization Shocker and converted into the cyborg Kamen Rider 3 (仮面ライダー3号, Kamen Raidā Sangō) and granted the use of the TriCyclone (トライサイクロン, Torai Saikuron) car. First appearing in the two-part crossover special Shuriken Sentai Ninninger vs. Kamen Rider Drive: Spring Break Combined 1 Hour Special, Shocker sends Kuroi to test his skills against Kamen Rider Mach before sparing him since he is not Kuroi's primary target. During the events of the crossover film Super Hero Taisen GP: Kamen Rider 3, the terrorists use a History Modification Machine (歴史改変マシン, Rekishi Kaihen Mashin) to send Kuroi back in time to the year 1973 to alter history by killing Kamen Riders 1 and 2. In the subsequent alternate timeline, Shocker has conquered the world and converted most of the world's heroic Riders into their Shocker Riders while allowing Kuroi to go rogue and fulfill his desire to become the strongest Rider. After Drive regains his memories of the original timeline, he challenges Kuroi to a race, during which the latter realizes the error of his ways and gracefully accepts his subsequent loss. Despite being turned into Shocker's Great Leader's Rider Robo (ライダーロボ, Raida Robo), Kuroi uses the last of his willpower to bring 1 and 2 to the altered present and restore the Shocker Riders' memories before breaking free of the Great Leader's control to help the Riders fight Shocker. Once Drive and the Ninningers destroy the Rider Robo, Kuroi realizes it was the source of his powers and bids farewell to the Riders, promising to meet them again in the restored timeline, in which he has resumed racing. Kyoichiro Kuroi is portrayed by Mitsuhiro Oikawa (及川 光博, Oikawa Mitsuhiro).
- Reiko Nishihori (西堀 令子, Nishihori Reiko): The daughter of criminal psychologist, Koya Nishihori, who holds a grudge against the Kamen Riders following her father's arrest. First appearing in episodes 27 and 28 of the series, she merges with the Seeker Roidmude in a plot to seek revenge on Kamen Riders and manipulate Kamen Rider Mach into killing her to ruin his reputation, only to be separated from Seeker and arrested by Kamen Rider Drive. Two years later, during the events of the tie-in novel Novel: Kamen Rider Drive: Mach Saga and the V-Cinema Drive Saga: Kamen Rider Mach, Mach arranges for Reiko's release from prison, but Roidmude 005 frames her for a series of murder cases. After learning of Mach's past, Reiko attempts to stop 005, only to be kidnapped by him and rescued by Mach, with whom she enters a relationship with. Reiko Nishihori is portrayed by Haneyuri (はねゆり).
- Koichi Kano (狩野 洸一, Kano Kōichi): A traffic police officer who Chase copied the form of. Following a minor appearance in episode 47 of the series, Kano returns in the tie-in novel Novel: Kamen Rider Drive: Mach Saga and the V-Cinema Drive Saga: Kamen Rider Mach as a member of the revived Special Investigations Division. Koichi Kano is portrayed by Taiko Katono, who also portrays Chase.
- Keisuke Okamura (岡村 敬助, Okamura Keisuke): The leader of the criminal organization Neo-Shade (ネオシェード, Neo Shēdo) and a fugitive who Shinnosuke Tomari and Akira Hayase pursued before the Global Freeze occurred. After recruiting Roidmudes into Neo-Shade and stealing the Newton Eyecon following Kamen Rider Ghost's fight with Paradox during the events of the film Kamen Rider Drive: Surprise Future, Okamura resurfaces in the present. Despite drawing Ghost and a Gamma Commando's attention, Okamura evades them, only to be arrested by Shinnosuke, who indirectly gives the Eyecon back to Ghost. Keisuke Okamura is portrayed by Hassei Takano (高野 八誠, Takano Hassei).
- Kamen Rider Ghost (仮面ライダーゴースト, Kamen Raidā Gōsuto): The heir to the Daitenkū-ji Buddhist temple. After helping Kamen Rider Drive fight Paradox during the events of the film Kamen Rider Drive: Surprise Future, Ghost appears in the series finale to assist in the Metropolitan Police Department's investigation into Neo-Shade while working to recover the Newton Eyecon from the latter. Kamen Rider Ghost is voiced by Shun Nishime (西銘 駿, Nishime Shun), ahead of his appearance in his self-titled TV series.
- Yurusen (ユルセン): A ghostly sprite and ally of Kamen Rider Ghost. Yurusen is voiced by Aoi Yūki (悠木 碧, Yūki Aoi), ahead of their appearance in Kamen Rider Ghost.

== Spin-off characters ==
=== Roidmude 005 ===
Roidmude 005 (ロイミュード005, Roimyūdo Zero Zero Go) is a Bat-Type Roidmude who assumed the form of criminal psychologist, Koya Nishihori. First appearing in the DVD specials Type Zero Episode 0: Countdown to Global Freeze and Type TV-Kun Hunter & Monster! Chase the Mystery of the Super Thief!, 005 briefly kidnapped Koya to steal his form before the former's body was destroyed by Kamen Rider Proto Drive during the Global Freeze before his core was seemingly destroyed by Kamen Rider Drive. In the tie-in novel Novel: Kamen Rider Drive: Mach Saga, it is revealed 005 uploaded a backup of his core to the internet to plan revenge on the Kamen Riders, which caused him to evolve into the Revenger Roidmude (リベンジャーロイミュード, Ribenjā Roimyūdo), though his new body is destroyed by Super Dead Heat Mach. During the events of the Drive Saga V-Cinemas, Kamen Rider Heart and Kamen Rider Mach, Revenger's core is temporarily absorbed by the unstable Roidmude 5886 before Kamen Rider Heart destroys it, allowing Revenger to escape and frame Nishihori's daughter, Reiko, for his crimes, lure Mach into a trap, and attempt to kill him along with several father/daughter pairs, only to be destroyed permanently by Kamen Rider Mach Chaser.

Roidmude 005 is portrayed by Toru Nomaguchi, who also portrays Koya Nishihori.

=== Zoruku Tojo ===
Zoruku Tojo (ゾルーク東条, Zorūku Tōjō) is a master criminal and gentleman thief nicknamed "Phantom Thief Ultimate Lupin" (怪盗アルティメット・ルパン, Kitō Arutimetto Rupan). First appearing in the crossover film Kamen Rider × Kamen Rider Drive & Gaim: Movie War Full Throttle and sometime after the Global Freeze, an aged Tojo found Cyberoid ZZZ (サイバロイドZZZ, Saibaroido Surī Zetto), an android that Krim Steinbelt created in preparation for the Roidmudes' attack against humanity with the intention of transferring his consciousness into it before he was forced to put the android in storage as it requires a strong mind to control it. Before his death, Tojo transferred his mind into Cyberoid ZZZ, obtains a variant of the Break Gunner called the Lupin Gunner (ルパンガンナー, Rupan Gannā), and goes on a crime spree as Kamen Rider Lupin (仮面ライダールパン, Kamen Raidā Rupan). However, he is confronted and defeated by Kamen Rider Drive, who burns out Cyberoid ZZZ and forces out Tojo's consciousness, which ends up in a Bat Viral Core. Via a holographic projection, Tojo promises Drive he will return.

As of the Hyper Battle DVD special Type Lupin! ~Lupin, the Last Challenge~, Tojo has become a Roidmude and recovered from his injuries, only to be attacked by Roidmude 100, who steals his Lupin Gunner to pose as him. Tojo eventually finds Drive and 100, steals back the Lupin Gunner, and helps the former defeat the latter, burning up the last of his energy in the process. Through a letter he sent before he died, Tojo leaves his Lupin Gunner and Viral Core with Drive for safekeeping.

As Kamen Rider Lupin, Tojo possesses enough power to destroy regular Roidmudes and their cores. He can also combine the Lupin Gunner and the Lupin Blade (ルパンブレード, Rupan Bureido) Viral Core to access the former's dagger-like Blade Mode (ブレードモード, Bureido Mōdo).

Zoruku Tojo is portrayed by Yūji Ayabe (綾部 祐二, Ayabe Yūji).

=== Kamen Rider 4 ===
Kamen Rider 4 (仮面ライダー4号, Kamen Raidā Yongō) is a Rider that Shocker created to alter history who was created from a time paradox due to Takumi Inui's wish to protect people without having them die and appears exclusively in the after-credits scene of the crossover film Super Hero Taisen GP: Kamen Rider 3 and a self-titled web series. Following their failure to use Kamen Rider 3 to alter history, Shocker uses the History Modification Machine to send 4 back in time and lead the Shocker Air Force in another attempt. However, 4 is killed by Kamen Rider Drive.

While transformed, 4 possesses a wingsuit and pilots the Douglas A-1 Skyraider-esque Sky Cyclone (スカイサイクロン, Sukai Saikuron) aircraft, which can combine with two Shocker Fighters.

Kamen Rider 4 is voiced by Mitsuru Matsuoka (松岡 充, Matsuoka Mitsuru).

=== Eiji Tomari ===
Eiji Tomari (泊 エイジ, Tomari Eiji) is Shinnosuke Tomari and Kiriko Shijima's son. First appearing in the film Kamen Rider Drive: Surprise Future, Paradox kills and poses as a future version of Eiji from the year 2035 in an attempt to alter history. However, Eiji used mind link technology that Krim Steinbelt had developed to upload his consciousness into the Shift Next Special Car to help the present Shinnosuke defeat Paradox. As of the V-Cinema Drive Saga: Kamen Rider Mach, Kiriko has given birth to Eiji.

The adult Eiji Tomari is portrayed by Mackenyu (真剣佑, Makken'yū).

=== Paradox ===
The Paradox Roidmude (パラドックスロイミュード, Paradokkusu Roimyūdo), also known simply as Paradox (パラドックス, Paradokkusu) and formerly known as Roidmude 108 (ロイミュード108, Roimyūdo Ichi Zero Hachi), is a namesake-themed Spider-Type Roidmude loyal to Tenjuro Banno and Roidmude 004 who appears exclusively in the film Kamen Rider Drive: Surprise Future. In a future timeline where Banno succeeded in enacting the second Global Freeze, Paradox was sealed away by his fellow Roidmudes. After breaking free in the year 2035, he attacks and kills Eiji Tomari before stealing his Rider equipment to pose as him while using a duplicate AI of himself to operate as Kamen Rider Dark Drive (仮面ライダーダークドライブ, Kamen Raidā Dāku Doraibu). Traveling back in time to the present, Paradox tricks Shinnosuke into destroying Mr. Belt, turns the police force against the former, and fuses with his present self to transform into a Supreme Evolved Form (超絶進化態, Chōzetsu Shinkatai) to personally cause the second Global Freeze as part of a predestination paradox. However, Chase rescues and reveals the truth to Shinnosuke, who transfers Mr. Belt's consciousness to Paradox's abandoned Rider equipment before destroying him.

Utilizing the Shift Next Special Car's yellow-colored Next (ネクスト, Nekusuto) half in conjunction with the Drive Driver and Shift Brace, Paradox can transform into Kamen Rider Dark Drive Type Next (タイプネクスト, Taipu Nekusuto). While transformed, he wields the Blade Gunner (ブレードガンナー, Burēdo Gan'nā) sword. His personal vehicle is the Mercedes-AMG GT-esque NexTridoron (ネクストライドロン, Nekusutoraidoron) car.

Paradox is voiced by Rikiya Koyama (小山 力也, Koyama Rikiya).

=== Angel ===
The Angel Roidmude (エンジェルロイミュード, Enjeru Roimyūdo), also known simply as Angel (エンジェル, Enjeru) and formerly known as Roidmude 099 (ロイミュード099, Roimyūdo Zero Kyū Kyū), is a namesake-themed Spider-Type Roidmude who assumed the form of psychiatrist Shoko Hazama (羽佐間 翔子, Hazama Shōko), quickly achieved her Over-Evolved form, and appears exclusively in the V-Cinema Drive Saga: Kamen Rider Chaser. She uses her Feather Circuits (フェザーサーキット, Fezā Sākitto), which allow Roidmudes to experience human emotions, to convince others of her kind to join her in rebelling against Heart's leadership and give Chase the opportunity to fulfill his quest to become human via emotions as part of her plot to overload Roidmudes and humans' minds with euphoria until they die. Despite absorbing several Roidmudes to strengthen herself, she is eventually destroyed by Chase at the cost of his newfound emotions.

Angel is portrayed by Mami Yamasaki (山崎 真実, Yamasaki Mami).
