= List of Shuriken Sentai Ninninger characters =

Shuriken Sentai Ninninger (手裏剣戦隊ニンニンジャー, Shuriken Sentai Ninninjā) is a Japanese tokusatsu series that serves as the 39th installment in the Super Sentai franchise and the 27th entry in the Heisei era.

== Main characters ==
=== Ninningers ===
The eponymous Ninningers are five descendants of the Igasaki Clan (伊賀崎氏, Igasaki-shi) ninja who are practitioners of the Shuriken Ninja Art (手裏剣忍法, Shuriken Ninpō) ninjutsu who battled Gengetsu Kibaoni during Japan's Sengoku Era, and the grandchildren of Yoshitaka Igasaki and his friends, who prepared them for Gengetsu's predestined return. In time, they are joined by an American Yokai Hunter who seeks to become Yoshitaka's apprentice.

In combat, the Ninningers' arsenal revolves around their Nin Shuriken (忍シュリケン) and honing their Nintality (忍タリティ, Nintariti). The primary members utilize the Ninja Ichibantou (忍者一番刀, Ninja Ichibantō; Ninja Number One Sword) ninjatō in conjunction with their personal Transformation (変化, Henge) Nin Shuriken to transform and perform the Nin Fury Slash (忍烈斬, Nin Retsu Zan) finisher, the Goton (五トン; Five Release) Nin Shuriken to perform elemental ninjutsu, the Technique (技, Waza) Nin Shuriken to perform unique ninjutsu, and the Otomonin Nin Shuriken to summon their Otomonin. Additionally, they each carry a Gama-Gama Gun (ガマガマ銃, Gama Gama Jū; Frog-Frog Gun), which doubles as a Yokai detection system, and a Karakuri Hengen (カラクリヘンゲン; Clockwork Transformer) shuriken, which can switch between its Karakuri Hengen Sword (カラクリヘンゲン刀, Karakuri Hengen Katana), Karakuri Hengen Bow (カラクリヘンゲン弓, Karakuri Hengen Yumi), and Karakuri Hengen Claw (カラクリヘンゲン爪, Karakuri Hengen Tsume) modes, as their sidearms.

After acquiring the Chozetsu Shobu Changer (超絶勝負チェンジャー, Chōzetsu Shōbu Chenjā; Transcendent Battle Changer) bracelet, any one of the Ninningers can utilize it to assume an armored Chozetsu (超絶, Chōzetsu) form. They can also combine the Chozetsu Shobu Changer and a Ninja Ichibantou to form the Ninja Ichiban Shobutou (忍者一番勝負刀, Ninja Ichiban Sōbutō), which allows them to perform the Chozetsu Shuriken Slash (超絶シュリケン斬, Chōzetsu Shuriken Zan) finisher.

==== Takaharu Igasaki ====
Takaharu Igasaki (伊賀崎 天晴, Igasaki Takaharu) is the leader of the Ninningers and an impulsive optimist who acts like a big brother to his teammates and serves as the red-colored Aka Ninger (アカニンジャー, Aka Ninjā). Out of the group, he is most adamant about being a ninja and wishes to become the type that his grandfather is. Following the Ninningers' final battle with Gengetsu Kibaoni, Takaharu opens a ninjutsu school and goes on to get married and have a son named Yoshiharu.

Takaharu Igasaki is portrayed by Shunsuke Nishikawa (西川 俊介, Nishikawa Shunsuke). As a child, Takaharu is portrayed by Kento Kusumi (久住 健斗, Kusumi Kento).

==== Yakumo Kato ====
Yakumo "Cloud" Kato (加藤 "クラウド" 八雲, Katō "Kuraudo" Yakumo) is a cold yet quick-tempered realist who was originally in England to learn magic before he was called back to Japan despite displaying no desire to carry on Yoshitaka's legacy. Instead, Yakumo prefers to prove himself as the most skilled practitioner of the Shuriken Ninja Arts while serving as the blue-colored Ao Ninger (アオニンジャー, Ao Ninjā). Following the Ninningers' final battle with Gengetsu Kibaoni, Yakumo returns to England with Kasumi to finish magic school with a combination of magic and his ninja skills.

During the events of the crossover film Kamen Rider × Super Sentai: Ultra Super Hero Taisen, the Game World version of Yakumo temporarily assumes the form of Aorider (アオライダー, Aoraidā) where he commands Kamen Rider Kiva's Castle Doran.

Yakumo Kato is portrayed by Gaku Matsumoto (松本 岳, Matsumoto Gaku).

==== Nagi Matsuo ====
Nagi Matsuo (松尾 凪, Matsuo Nagi) is a friendly and observant prankster, high schooler, and youngest member of the team with a desire to master various things who serves as the yellow-colored Ki Ninger (キニンジャー, Ki Ninjā). Following the Ninningers' final battle with Gengetsu Kibaoni, Nagi studies with Fuka to enter university.

Nagi Matsuo is portrayed by Kaito Nakamura (中村 嘉惟人, Nakamura Kaito).

==== Fuka Igasaki ====
Fuka Igasaki (伊賀崎 風花, Igasaki Fūka) is Takaharu's reliable yet clumsy younger sister and high schooler who initially believes the Igasaki Clan's history was a fairy tale before joining the Ninningers as the white-colored Shiro Ninger (シロニンジャー, Shiro Ninjā). Following the Ninningers' final battle with Gengetsu Kibaoni, Fuka studies with Nagi to enter university while setting her sights on becoming an idol.

Fuka Igasaki is portrayed by Yuuka Yano (矢野 優花, Yano Yūka). As a child, Fuka is portrayed by Ami Watanabe (渡辺 杏実, Watanabe Ami).

==== Kasumi Momochi ====
Kasumi Momochi (百地 霞, Momochi Kasumi) is a reserved yet sharp-tongued university student who aims to become a scientist despite being unable to take a hint and serves as the pink-colored Momo Ninger (モモニンジャー, Momo Ninjā). Following the Ninningers' final battle with Gengetsu Kibaoni, Kasumi travels to England with Yakumo so she can continue researching her team's arsenal through scientific means.

Kasumi Momochi is portrayed by Kasumi Yamaya (山谷 花純, Yamaya Kasumi).

==== Kinji Takigawa ====
Kinji Takigawa (キンジ・タキガワ) is a Yokai Hunter (妖怪ハンター, Yōkai Hantā) from the United States who was trained by his father Junji (ジュンジ) before the latter and Kinji's older brother Reiji (レイジ) were killed by the Western Yokai Okami-otoko. In his quest to become a legendary Yokai hunter, Kinji seeks out Yoshitaka to become his apprentice and followed him to Japan, where the former learns to speak in an old Japanese Edo dialect after watching jidaigeki and rakugo. While undergoing Yoshitaka's tests, Kinji goes on to form bonds with and join the Ninningers and assist them in their battles with Gengetsu Kibaoni. Following their final battle with him, Kinji inherits Yoshitaka's oden business and starts operating it in the United States.

Unlike the primary Ninningers, Kinji utilizes the Ninja Star Burger (忍者スターバーガー, Ninja Sutā Bāgā) cellphone, which has a Yokai alert system, can be used to summon his Otomonin, & to transform into the gold-colored Star Ninger (スターニンジャー, Sutā Ninjā). He also carries the Furai (風雷; Wind and Lightning) Nin Shuriken, which like the Goton Nin Shuriken allows him to perform elemental ninjutsu, and wields the Star Sword Gun (スターソードガン, Sutā Sōdo Gan) electric guitar, which has a Sword Mode (剣モード, Ken Mōdo) for performing the Winning Rock Star (ウイニングロックスター, Uiningu Rokku Sutā) finisher and a Gun Mode (銃モード, Jū Mōdo) for performing the Lightning Rock Star (ライトニングロックスター, Raitoningu Rokku Sutā) finisher.

Later in the series, Kinji acquires a variant of the Ninja Ichibantou called the Ninja Gekiatsutou (忍者激熱刀, Ninja Gekiatsutō; Ninja Intense Heat Sword), which allows him to transform into his power-up form; Super Star Ninger (スーパースターニンジャー, Sūpā Sutā Ninjā). His finishers in this form are the Gekiatsu Winning Super Star (激熱ウイニングスーパースター, Gekiatsu Uiningu Sūpā Sutā) and the Gekiatsu Lightning Super Star (激熱ライトニングスーパースター, Gekiatsu Raitoningu Sūpā Sutā).

Kinji Takigawa is portrayed by Hideya Tawada (多和田 秀弥, Tawada Hideya). As a child, Kinji is portrayed by Shion Ishizuka (石塚 獅桜, Ishizuka Shion).

=== Otomonin ===
The Otomonin (オトモ忍; Companion Ninja) are mecha created by Yoshitaka using alien technology that are normally hidden in the city until they are summoned by the Ninningers via their Ninja Ichibantou in conjunction with a corresponding Otomonin Shuriken (オトモ忍シュリケン). The Ninningers later create their secondary Otomonin themselves by giving them life with their own spirits.

- Shinobimaru (シノビマル): Aka Ninger's personal humanoid ninja-themed Otomonin that forms the control unit of Shurikenzin and the left arm of Shurikenzin Drago.
- Dragomaru (ドラゴマル, Doragomaru): Ao Ninger's personal European dragon-themed Otomonin capable of breathing Drago Fire (ドラゴファイヤー, Dorago Faiyā) and performing the Drago Tornado (ドラゴトルネード, Dorago Torunēdo) attack that forms the left arm of Shurikenzin and the control unit of Shurikenzin Drago.
- Dumpmaru (ダンプマル, Danpumaru): Ki Ninger's personal dump truck-themed Otomonin capable of tossing Dump Makibishi (ダンプマキビシ, Danpu Makibishi) that forms the torso and right arm of Shurikenzin (Drago).
- Wanmaru (ワンマル): Shiro Ninger's personal dog-themed Otomonin, also known as a ninken (忍犬; Ninja dog), that normally rides in Byunmaru and forms the left shin of Shurikenzin (Drago).
- Byunmaru (ビュンマル): Momo Ninger's personal maglev-themed Otomonin capable of tossing Byun Shuriken (ビュンシュリケン, Byun Shuriken) that forms the legs and hips of Shurikenzin (Drago).
- Rodeomaru (ロデオマル): Star Ninger's personal humanoid bull rider-themed Otomonin that he created using Yoshitaka's autobiography.
  - Bison King Buggy (バイソンキングバギー, Baison Kingu Bagī): An ATV/bull/karakuri machine-themed support Otomonin that is ridden by Rodeomaru.
- Paonmaru (パオンマル): An elephant-themed Otomonin capable of performing the Paon Jet (パオンジェット, Paon Jetto) attack and assuming a humanoid form.
- UFOmaru (UFOマル, Yūfōmaru): A flying saucer-themed Otomonin and the prototype of the other Otomonin capable of assuming a humanoid form.
- Surfermaru (サーファーマル, Sāfāmaru): A shark/submarine-themed Otomonin capable of assuming a humanoid form.
- Lion HaOjo (ライオンハオージョウ, Raion Haōjō): A lion/castle-themed Otomonin, also known as the Sky Otomonin (天空のオトモ忍, Tenkū no Otomonin), that is capable of assuming a humanoid form called Lion HaOh (ライオンハオー, Raion Haō) via Lion Change (ライオン変化, Raion Henge) where it dual wields the twin Great Shuriken (大シュリケン, Dai Shuriken), which allow it to perform the Great Shuriken Crash (大シュリケンクラッシュ, Dai Shuriken Kurasshu) attack. Its finisher is the Lion Chozetsu Slash (ライオン超絶斬り, Raion Chōzetsu Giri). Additionally, Lion HaOjo's essence can assume a human form named ShishiOh (獅子王, Shishiō). ShishiOh is portrayed by Yukio Yamagata (山形 ユキオ, Yamagata Yukio).
- Hououmaru (ホウオウマル, Hōōmaru): Aka Ninger's Vermillion Bird/fighter aircraft-themed secondary Otomonin that forms the headdress of Gekiatsu DaiOh.
- Seiryumaru (セイリュウマル, Seiryūmaru): Ao Ninger's Azure Dragon/motorcycle-themed secondary Otomonin that forms the right arm of Gekiatsu DaiOh.
- Genbumaru (ゲンブマル): Ki Ninger's Black Tortoise/tank-themed secondary Otomonin that forms the main body of Gekiatsu DaiOh.
- Byakkomaru (ビャッコマル): Shiro Ninger's White Tiger/4WD vehicle-themed secondary Otomonin that forms the right leg of Gekiatsu DaiOh.
- Pandamaru (パンダマル): Momo Ninger's panda/helicopter-themed secondary Otomonin that forms the left leg of Gekiatsu DaiOh.
- Magoimaru (マゴイマル): Star Ninger's black carp/motorcycle-themed secondary Otomonin that forms the left arm of Gekiatsu DaiOh.
- Tridoron (トライドロン, Toraidoron): Kamen Rider Drive's sports car that is temporarily enlarged and converted into an Otomonin capable of assuming a humanoid form. This Otomonin appears exclusively in the crossover film Super Hero Taisen GP: Kamen Rider 3.
- Dinomaru (ダイノマル, Dainomaru): A Tyrannosaurus-themed Otomonin capable of assuming a humanoid form that was originally Tatsunosuke Hakkaku's cursed form, the "terrible dragon", before Shinobimaru broke off Hakkaku's horn. This Otomonin appears exclusively in the films Shuriken Sentai Ninninger the Movie: The Dinosaur Lord's Splendid Ninja Scroll! and Come Back! Shuriken Sentai Ninninger: Ninnin Girls vs. Boys FINAL WARS.

==== Shuriken Combinations ====
The Otomonin can be assembled into giant robots via Shuriken Combination (シュリケン合体, Shuriken Gattai).

- Shurikenzin (シュリケンジン, Shurikenjin): The Ninningers' first giant robot composed of the five main Otomonin that wields the Drago Sword (ドラゴソード, Dorago Sōdo) and the Drago Shield (ドラゴシールド, Dorago Shīrudo). Its finisher is the Shurikenzin: Splendid Slash (シュリケンジン・アッパレ斬り, Shurikenjin Appare Giri). While Shinobimaru serves as the main "pilot", other Otomonin can take the former's place while it becomes an arm.
  - Shurikenzin Drago (シュリケンジンドラゴ, Shurikenjin Dorago): A variation of Shurikenzin that swaps Shinobimaru and Dragomaru's positions. Its finisher is the Shurikenzin: Drago Burst (シュリケンジン・ドラゴバースト, Shurikenjin Dorago Bāsuto).
  - Shurikenzin Paon (シュリケンジンパオーン, Shurikenjin Paōn): A combination of Shurikenzin and Paonmaru that dual wields the twin Paon Axes (パオンアックス, Paon Akkusu). Its finisher is the Shurikenzin: Paon Boomerang (シュリケンジン・パオーンブーメラン, Shurikenjin Paōn Būmeran).
  - Shurikenzin UFO (シュリケンジンUFO, Shurikenjin Yūfō): A combination of Shurikenzin and UFOmaru that wields the UFOmaru Launcher (UFOマルランチャー, Yūfōmaru Ranchā) shotgun. Its finisher is the Shurikenzin: UFO Big Bang (シュリケンジン・UFOビッグバン, Shurikenjin Yūfō Biggu Ban).
  - King Shurikenzin (キングシュリケンジン, Kingu Shurikenjin): The King Shuriken Combination (キングシュリケン合体, Kingu Shuriken Gattai) of Shurikenzin and Bison King that wields the Bison Drago Sword (バイソンドラゴソード, Baison Dorago Sōdo). Its finisher is the King Unprecedented Slash (キング破天荒斬り, Kingu Hatenkō Giri).
  - Shurikenzin Surfer (シュリケンジンサーファー, Shurikenjin Sāfā): A combination of Shurikenzin and Surfermaru that is equipped with the Surfermaru Board (サーファーマルボード, Sāfāmaru Bōdo). Its finisher is the Shurikenzin: Surfer Surfing Slash (シュリケンジン・サーファー波乗り斬り, Shurikenjin Sāfā Naminori Giri).
  - HaOh Shurikenzin (覇王シュリケンジン, Haō Shurikenjin): The HaOh Shuriken Combination (ハオー手裏剣合体, Haō Shuriken Gattai) of Shurikenzin, Bison King, and Lion HaOjo. Its finisher is the HaOh Splendid Buster (覇王アッパレバスター, Haō Appare Basutā).
  - Shurikenzin Tridoron (シュリケンジントライドロン, Shurikenjin Toraidoron): A combination of Shurikenzin and Kamen Rider Drive's Tridoron. Its finisher is the Shurikenzin: Tridoron Slash (シュリケンジン・トライドロン斬り, Shurikenjin Toraidoron Giri). This combination appears exclusively in the crossover film Super Hero Taisen GP: Kamen Rider 3.
  - Shurikenzin Dino (シュリケンジンダイノ, Shurikenjin Daino): A combination of Shurikenzin and Dinomaru that wields the Dino Drill (ダイノドリル, Daino Doriru), which allows it to perform the Dino Hammer (ダイノハンマー, Daino Hanmā) attack. Its finisher is the Shurikenzin: Dinomic Summer (シュリケンジン・ダイノミックサマー, Shurikenjin Dainomikku Samā). This combination appears exclusively in the films Shuriken Sentai Ninninger the Movie: The Dinosaur Lord's Splendid Ninja Scroll! and Come Back! Shuriken Sentai Ninninger: Ninnin Girls vs. Boys FINAL WARS.
- Bison King (バイソンキング, Baison Kingu): Star Ninger's personal giant robot composed of Rodeomaru and the Bison King Buggy that wields the Bison Rifle (バイソンライフル, Baison Raifuru). Its finisher is the Bison Rough Buster (バイソン・荒くれバスター, Baison Arakure Basutā).
  - Bison King Drago (バイソンキングドラゴ, Baison Kingu Dorago): A combination of Bison King and Dragomaru that wields the Drago Sword.
- Gekiatsu DaiOh (ゲキアツダイオー, Gekiatsu Daiō): The Ninningers' second giant robot composed of Hououmaru, Seryumaru, Genbumaru, Byakkomaru, Pandamaru, and Magoimaru via Gekiatsu Shuriken Combination (ゲキアツシュリケン合体, Gekiatsu Shuriken Gattai) that can perform the Gekiatsu Fire (ゲキアツファイヤー, Gekiatsu Faiyā) and Gekiatsu Shot (ゲキアツショット, Gekiatsu Shotto) attacks. Its finisher is the Gekiatsu Grand Fever (ゲキアツ大フィーバー, Gekiatsu Dai Fībā).
  - HaOh Gekiatsu Daioh (覇王ゲキアツダイオー, Haō Gekiatsu Daiō): The HaOh Gekiatsu Combination (ハオーゲキアツ合体, Haō Gekiatsu Gattai) of Gekiatsu DaiOh, Bison King, and Lion HaOjo that can perform the HaOh Gekiatsu Bomber (覇王ゲキアツボンバー, Haō Gekiatsu Bonbā) attack. Its finisher is the HaOh Gekiatsu Number One (覇王ゲキアツ大一番, Haō Gekiatsu Ōichiban).
- HaOh ToQ DaiOh (覇王トッキュウダイオー, Haō Tokkyū Daiō): The Ninnin ToQ Combination (ニンニントッキュウ合体, Ninnin Tokkyū Gattai) of Lion HaOjo, ToQ-Oh, and the Build Ressha that is controlled by the Ninningers and ToQgers. Its finisher is the Otomonin Connection Splendid Crash (オトモ忍レンケツアッパレクラッシュ, Otomonin Renketsu Appare Kurasshu). This combination appears exclusively in the crossover film Shuriken Sentai Ninninger vs. ToQger the Movie: Ninja in Wonderland.

== Recurring characters ==
=== Kibaoni Army Corps ===
The Kibaoni Army Corps (牙鬼軍団, Kibaoni Gundan) is an army of Yokai based in the Kibaoni Castle (牙鬼城, Kibaoni-jō) that seeks to conquer the world through the "Power of Fear" (恐れの力, Osore no Chikara). After being revived as an oni in the 20th century, Gengetsu Kibaoni and his forces were sealed within forty-eight Sealing Shuriken (封印の手裏剣, Fūin no Shuriken) by the Ninningers' grandfather Yoshitaka Igasaki. After decades of waiting, Kyuemon Izayoi manages to break the seal and release the Kibaoni Army Corps in the present so he can restore their leader and resume their campaign with the power of the End Shuriken (終わりの手裏剣, Owari no Shuriken).

==== Gengetsu Kibaoni ====
Gengetsu Kibaoni (牙鬼 幻月, Kibaoni Gengetsu) (Note: Gengetsu Kibaoni's name can be literally translated as "Fanged Oni Paraselene" (牙鬼 幻月, Kibaoni Gengetsu).) is the leader and namesake of the Kibaoni Army Corps who was originally a human feudal warlord from the Sengoku period who believed that fear was the best method to unite the war-torn Japan. After being killed by Igasaki Clan ninjas, Gengetsu vowed to return in 444 years to resume his campaign. Centuries later, he sacrificed his humanity to return as an oni before he was sealed by Yoshitaka Igasaki. Nevertheless, due to a miscalculation, Gengetsu returned once more in 2015 with Kyuemon Izayoi's help.

Initially lacking a physical form, Gengetsu tasks his retainers with gathering fear so he can reconstitute himself. Eventually succeeding after absorbing his wife Ariake no Kata's grief over losing their son Mangetsu before absorbing Ariake herself and Kyuemon, Gengetsu enlarges himself to face the Ninningers in a final battle, during which he is permanently killed by Gekiatsu DaiOh after Kyuemon breaks free of his body.

In combat, Gengetsu wields the Gangataikaku (含牙戴角; Fang and Horn) naginata and can perform the Way of the Supreme Fang Hundred Demons Illusion (牙凌道・百鬼幻, Garyōdō Hyakkigen) and Way of the Supreme Fang Asura (牙凌道・阿修羅, Garyōdō Ashura) attacks.

Gengetsu Kibaoni is voiced by Mugihito (麦人).

==== Kyuemon Izayoi ====
Shingetsu Kyuemon Kibaoni (牙鬼 久右衛門 新月, Kibaoni Kyūemon Shingetsu), also known as Kyuemon Izayoi (十六夜 九衛門, Izayoi Kyūemon), (Note: Kyuemon Izayoi's name can be literally translated as "Full Moon Nine-Guarded Gate" (十六夜 九衛門, Izayoi Kyūemon)) is the son of Gengetsu Kibaoni and a concubine who was born 444 years prior to the series and Gengetsu sent to the present to facilitate his second revival. Growing up, Kyuemon became Yoshitaka's first apprentice, but became fearful of the "Last Ninja's" power when Yoshitaka refused to give him the End Shuriken and stole Tsumuji's ninjutsu. Following this, Kyuemon's Yokai power emerged, transforming him into a kitsune-masked form with mastery of Yojutsu (妖術, Yōjutsu; Bewitching Art) spells and developed a hatred towards his former mentor.

In the present, Kyuemon orders the destruction of the Igasaki Ninjutsu Dojo to obtain a ceremonial mallet so he can free Gengetsu and serve as his page while searching for the End Shuriken, believing he has a right to it due to his connection to Yoshitaka, and corrupting the Sealing Shuriken used to seal Gengetsu for the Kibaoni Army Corps' benefit. Amidst his battles with the Ninningers, Kyuemon manipulates Raizo Gabi, forms an alliance with Kinji, acts against Masakage Tsugomori and Ariake no Kata, and revives four of the Oniwaban Five as his servants to suit his needs.

During the Kibaoni Army Corps' final battle with the Ninningers, Kyuemon steals Yoshitaka's Nintality and the End Shuriken, using both to assume a more powerful form, but is confronted with the fact that he followed in Yoshitaka's footsteps in seeking the End Shuriken to bring his family back. Upon confirming this, Kyuemon acknowledges Yoshitaka as his mentor and receives his own Nin Shuriken, but is absorbed by Gengetsu. Kyuemon eventually frees himself, allowing the Ninningers to kill Gengetsu. After making peace with Yoshitaka, Kyuemon returns the End Shuriken to the Ninningers before dying while his Nin Shuriken is enshrined in his memory.

Two years later, during the events of the V-Cinema Come Back! Shuriken Sentai Ninninger: Ninnin Girls vs. Boys FINAL WARS, Sakurako Igasaki gives Kyuemon's Nin Shuriken to Luna Kokonoe so she can become Mido Ninger. The Ninningers later learn Kyuemon's spirit was contained within the Nin Shuriken and he had possessed Kokonoe so he can fight alongside them and redeem himself. After defeating the revived Ariake and Mangetsu and returning the mallet, Kyuemon's spirit is allowed to reincarnate.

In combat, Kyuemon wields a bottle gourd to gather fear from terrorized humans and can use the mallet in conjunction with personally corrupted Sealing Shuriken, or Yo Shuriken (妖シュリケン, Yō Shuriken; Phantom Shuriken), such as the Goton Yo Shuriken to perform the Hypertrophic Fast Growth Technique (肥大蕃息の術, Hidaihansoku no Jutsu) to revive fallen Yokai as giants, the Yokai Fusing Technique (妖怪融合の術, Yōkai Yūgō no Jutsu) to turn humans into Yokai, the Shinobi Summoning Technique (忍び招へいの術, Shinobi Shōhei no Jutsu) to summon an Izayoi-Style Ninja and facilitated his revival of Gengetsu, and the Release Absorbing Technique (遊離吸収の術, Yūri Kyūshū no Jutsu) to absorb an Igasaki Clan ninja's Nintality; and the Gashadokuro Yo Shuriken to summon Gashadokuro. Additionally, he can transform the mallet into a sword and perform the Way of the Supreme Fang Crescent Moon (牙凌道・弧月, Garyōdō Kogetsu) and Way of the Supreme Fang Ultimate Secret Crescent Moon Dance (牙凌道究極奥義 弧月乱舞, Garyōdō Kyūkyoku Ōgi Kogetsu Ranbu) attacks. He also pilots an Otomonin called the Karakuri Kyubi (カラクリキュウビ, Karakuri Kyūbi), which is capable of using the four Oniwaban Five members' Core Gears, summoning Kogitsune (子狐) drones, and performing the Kogitsune Dance (子狐乱舞, Kogitsune Ranbu) attack, before it is destroyed by Gekiatsu DaiOh.

Kyuemon Izayoi is voiced by Megumi Han (潘 めぐみ, Han Megumi). As a teenager, Kyuemon is portrayed by Ryusei Takeba (竹場 龍生, Takeba Ryūsei).

==== Raizo Gabi ====
Raizo Gabi (蛾眉 雷蔵, Gabi Raizō) (Note: Raizo Gabi's name can be literally translated as "Moth-Eyebrowed Lightning Storage" (蛾眉 雷蔵, Gabi Raizō)) is the Goryō-themed spearhead of the Kibaoni Army Corps who bears the most hatred towards the Igasaki Clan and craves fighting powerful enemies, to the point where he will kill allies if he believes they are interfering with his desire. Despite being partially revived by Kyuemon, Raizo refuses to aid him, believing that fighting the Ninningers will fully awaken him. As a result, the latter develops a rivalry with Takaharu Igasaki and reluctantly aids Kyuemon so he can have a proper battle with the ninja. After fighting Takaharu twice and losing to him during their second encounter, Raizo gracefully accepts defeat, but is forcibly enlarged and brainwashed into becoming a berserker by Kyuemon. Ultimately, Raizo is killed by King Shurikenzin and returns to the afterlife. Following Gengetsu's full revival, he revives Raizo a second time via a corrupted Sealing Shuriken, giving him a more powerful form. Raizo battles Takaharu and Yakumo, who kill him in combat.

In combat, Raizo wields two katana and can perform the Way of the Supreme Fang Thunder Phantom Slash (牙凌道 雷幻斬り, Garyōdō Raigen Giri) attack.

Raizo Gabi is voiced by Kenji Matsuda (松田 賢二, Matsuda Kenji).

==== Masakage Tsugomori ====
Masakage Tsugomori (晦 正影, Tsugomori Masakage) (Note: Masakage Tsugomori's name can be literally translated as "Dark Pure Shadow" (晦 正影, Tsugomori Masakage)) is Gengetsu's Koromodako-themed chief retainer and strategist who sees the destruction of the Igasaki Clan as his top priority and comes off as playful, but is secretly dangerous and deceptive in combat. Additionally, he is a tiny Yokai piloting a mechanical replica of his original form. Following Raizo Gabi's death, Kyuemon revives Masakage to help him gather fear to revive Gengetsu. Despite knowing Kyuemon is not a true member of the Kibaoni Army Corps, Masakage allows him to stay so long as he does not betray Gengetsu. After Gengetsu is fully revived, Masakage becomes his second-in-command and personally battles the Ninningers until they discover his secret. Desperate, Masakage enlarges himself, but is killed by HaOh Gekiatsu DaiOh.

In combat, Masakage wields a shakujō and various magical powers and can perform the Way of the Supreme Fang Skull (牙凌道 洒落頭, Garyōdō Sharekōbe) attack.

Masakage Tsugomori is voiced by Ryūsei Nakao (中尾 隆聖, Nakao Ryūsei).

==== Ariake no Kata ====
Ariake no Kata (有明の方) (Note: Ariake no Kata's name can be literally translated as "Direction of Daybreak" (有明の方, Ariake no Kata)) is Gengetsu's impatient and vain Aonyōbō-themed wife who is always accompanied by two Hyakkarage bodyguards. In response to the Ninningers' growing power, Kyuemon reluctantly revives her, though she primarily yells at him and Masakage to fix things whenever events do not go right, uses gathered fear as a beauty treatment or to flavor shaved ice, focuses on pampering herself in preparation for her husband's revival, and dotes on her son Mangetsu despite his abuse. Upon learning of Mangetsu's death, her rage and grief creates excess fear energy, allowing Gengetsu to fully revive. Amidst the Kibaoni Army Corps' final battle with the Ninningers, she is mortally wounded by Moto and Star Ninger before Gengetsu absorbs Ariake.

Two years later, during the events of the V-Cinema Come Back! Shuriken Sentai Ninninger: Ninnin Girls vs. Boys FINAL WARS, Ariake revives herself to seek revenge on the Ninningers, only to be killed again by them.

In combat, Ariake wields the Jurisen (呪裏扇; Cursed Hidden Fan) war fan.

Ariake no Kata is voiced by Kotono Mitsuishi (三石 琴乃, Mitsuishi Kotono), who also portrays her human form.

==== Mangetsu Kibaoni ====
Mangetsu Kibaoni (牙鬼 萬月, Kibaoni Mangetsu) is Gengetsu Kibaoni and Ariake no Kata's son, Kyuemon Izayoi's younger half-brother, and a cruel and cunning warrior whose primary desire is to gather fear directly from the Ninningers to revive his father. After several battles with the Ninningers and enlarging himself, he is mortally wounded by HaOh Gekiatsu DaiOh. Before he dies, Kyuemon tells Mangetsu the truth of their familial relationship.

Two years later, during the events of the V-Cinema Come Back! Shuriken Sentai Ninninger: Ninnin Girls vs. Boys FINAL WARS, Mangetsu is revived by Ariake, but is killed alongside her by the Ninningers.

In combat, Mangetsu wields a great sword, can perform the Way of the Supreme Fang Mangetsu Slash (牙凌道・萬月斬, Garyōdō Mangetsuzan) attack, and is able to withstand an attack from the Ninningers in their Chozetsu forms.

Mangetsu Kibaoni is voiced by Ryōtarō Okiayu (置鮎 龍太郎, Okiayu Ryōtarō).

==== Foot soldiers ====
- Hitokarage (ヒトカラゲ): (Note: The name for the Hitokarage comes from the Japanese word jippahitokarage (十把一絡げ, "lumping together").) Ashigaru-themed foot soldiers who wield spears and arquebuses and are created from Gengetsu's energy leaking from the Yo Shuriken.
- Jyukkarage (ジュッカラゲ, Jukkarage): (Note: The name for the Jyukkarage comes from the Japanese words jū (十, "ten") and jippahitokarage.) Hitokarage enhanced by a Kibaoni general's power who wield sasumata-like swords and arquebuses.
- Senkarage (センカラゲ): (Note: The name for the Senkarage comes from the Japanese words sen (千, "thousand") and jippahitokarage.) Enlarged versions of the Hitokarage.
- Hyakkarage (ヒャッカラゲ): (Note: The name for the Hyakkarage comes from the Japanese words hyaku (百, "hundred") and jippahitokarage.) Elite Jyukkarage who are ten times stronger than them.
- Supparage (スッパラゲ): (Note: Their name comes from the Japanese words suppa (素破), an alternate term for "ninja", and jippahitokarage.) Kitsune-masked ninja/foot soldiers of the Izayoi-Style who wield ninjatō.
- Gashadokuro (ガシャドクロ): Giant, skeletal Yokai who wield twin-bladed billhooks that are summoned by Kyuemon. A number of the Gashadokuro can also combine to form a zanbatō for other enlarged Yokai to use.

==== Yokai ====
The Yokai (妖怪, Yōkai) are monsters created from a corrupted Sealing Shuriken coming into contact with an inanimate object. Acting on Gengetsu's will, Yokai serve to gather the "Power of Fear" by attacking people. Once a Yokai is killed, the Sealing Shuriken that formed its core is purified.

- Kamaitachi (カマイタチ): A Yokai created from a Sealing Shuriken and a chainsaw following the breaking of Gengetsu's seal. After being defeated by the primary Ninningers, Kamaitachi is enlarged before he is killed by Shurikenzin. Kamaitachi is voiced by Tetsu Inada (稲田 徹, Inada Tetsu).
- Kappa (カッパ): A Yokai created from a Sealing Shuriken and a fire extinguisher with a sumo-esque fighting style and cryokinesis. After being defeated by Aka and Ao Ninger, Kappa is enlarged before he is killed by Shurikenzin Drago. Kappa is voiced by Hironori Kondō (近藤 浩徳, Kondō Hironori).
- Kasha (カシャ): A Yokai created from a Sealing Shuriken and a pair of inline skates who wield blades capable of putting anything under his control. After being killed by Raizo Gabi for interfering with the former's fight with Aka Ninger, Kyuemon takes Kasha's Sealing Shuriken and converts it into the Gashadokuro Yo Shuriken. Kasha is voiced by Ryuzou Ishino (石野 竜三, Ishino Ryūzō).
- Tsuchigumo (ツチグモ): A Yokai created from a Sealing Shuriken and a refrigerator who can inhale targets and trap them in his cavernous stomach. After being defeated by the primary Ninningers, Tsuchigumo is enlarged before he is killed by Shurikenzin Paon. Tsuchigumo is voiced by Kōzō Dōzaka (堂坂 晃三, Dōzaka Kōzō).
- Ungaikyō (ウンガイキョウ): A Yokai created from a Sealing Shuriken and a parabolic antenna who wields Antenna-ken Tekagami (アンテナ剣テカガミ; Antenna Sword Hand Mirror) sword, which allows him to emit radio waves capable of manipulating opponents like puppets. After being defeated by the primary Ninningers, Ungaikyō is enlarged before he is killed by Shurikenzin UFO. Ungaikyō is voiced by Chō (チョー).
- Tengu (テング): A Yokai that Raizo created from a Sealing Shuriken and a clarinet who wield the Hanabue Uchiwa (鼻笛うちわ; Nose Flute Fan) fan and the ability to produce a tone from his nose capable of pulling targets into another dimension. After being defeated by Ao and Momo Ninger, Tengu is enlarged before he is killed by Shurikenzin Paon. Tengu is voiced by Masaharu Satō (佐藤 正治, Satō Masaharu).
- Nekomata (ネコマタ): A Yokai created from a Sealing Shuriken and a watch who possesses time travel capabilities and the ability to reverse his death, which rendered him immune to the Ninningers' Yokai detection technology, and Kyuemon recruited to find the End Shuriken. Despite being killed by the primary Ninningers, who reclaim his Sealing Shuriken, Nekomata revives himself before allowing Aka and Momo Ninger to kill him once more so he can infiltrate the Ninningers' dojo. However, the Ninningers destroy his stomach clock before killing him a third time, Kyuemon revives and enlarges Nekomata, who is killed permanently by Shiro Ninger via Shurikenzin Paon. Nekomata is voiced by Tomokazu Seki (関 智一, Seki Tomokazu).
- Ittan-momen (イッタンモメン): A Yokai that Kyuemon created from a Sealing Shuriken infused with Raizo Gabi's power and a carpet who possesses magic and wields the ScheheraHazard (シェラハザード, Sherahazādo) broom wand. After being defeated by Aka and Ao Ninger, Ittan-momen is enlarged before he is killed by Bison King. Ittan-momen is voiced by Takumi Yamazaki (山崎 たくみ, Yamazaki Takumi).
- Daidarabotchi (ダイダラボッチ): A Yokai created from a Sealing Shuriken and an excavator. After being defeated by Star Ninger, Daidarabotchi is enlarged before he is killed by Shurikenzin Paon and Bison King. Daidarabotchi is voiced by Kōzō Shioya (塩屋 浩三, Shioya Kōzō).
- Enraenra (エンラエンラ): A Yokai that Kyuemon created from a Sealing Shuriken and a kettle who can emit Sulk Smoke (イジケムリ, Ijikemuri), which can amplify targets' negative thoughts and paralyze them with the fear of being forgotten. After being defeated by Ao and Star Ninger, Enraenra is enlarged before he is killed by Shurikenzin and Bison King. Enraenra is voiced by Mitsuo Iwata (岩田 光央, Iwata Mitsuo).
- Yamawarawa (ヤマワラワ): A Yokai that Masakage created from a Sealing Shuriken and a pair of track shoes. After being defeated by Aka and Star Ninger, Yamawarawa is enlarged before he is killed by King Shurikenzin. Yamawarawa is voiced by Keiji Hirai (平井 啓二, Hirai Keiji).
- Yamabiko (ヤマビコ): A Yokai that Masakage created from a Sealing Shuriken and a payphone who is capable of mimicking others' voices and firing concussive soundwaves. After being defeated by Aka and Shiro Ninger, Yamabiko is enlarged before he is killed by Shurikenzin and Bison King. Yamabiko is voiced by Masaki Terasoma (てらそま まさき, Terasoma Masaki).
- Futakuchi-onna (フタクチオンナ): A business-minded Yokai that Masakage created from a Sealing Shuriken and a pair of glasses who can control targets who have signed contracts with her. After taking control of Rodeomaru, Momo Ninger uses Futakuchi-onna's pride and insecurity to trick her into destroying her contracts before the Yokai is killed by the primary Ninningers. Futakuchi-onna is voiced by Miyuki Sawashiro (沢城 みゆき, Sawashiro Miyuki).
- Kasabake (カサバケ): A Yokai that Masakage created from a Sealing Shuriken and Tsumuji's fountain pen who can summon rain, turn himself into an umbrella, and wields Explosive Ink Bombs (Bakuhatsu Inkudan). After being defeated by Aka Ninger with help from Tsumuji, Kasabake is enlarged before he is killed by King Shurikenzin. Kasabake is voiced by Mitsuaki Madono (真殿 光昭, Madono Mitsuaki).
- Umibōzu (ウミボウズ): A Yokai that Masakage created from a Sealing Shuriken and an inflatable raft who wields the double-bladed Gizagiza Nagisa (ぎざぎざ渚; Jagged Beach) naginata and can create fog-based illusions. After being defeated by Aka and Star Ninger, Umibōzu is enlarged before he is killed by Shurikenzin Surfer. Umibōzu is voiced by Katsuhisa Hōki (宝亀 克寿, Hōki Katsuhisa).
- Otoroshi (おとろし): A Yokai created from a Sealing Shuriken and Yakumo's lawn mower who can control one person for a short period of time before his thrall collapses from the strain. Despite initial reluctance, Ao Ninger eventually defeats him. Otoroshi is subsequently enlarged by Kyuemon and killed by Shurikenzin Surfer. Otoroshi is voiced by Tetsuo Gotō (後藤 哲夫, Gotō Tetsuo).
- Baku (バク): A Yokai created from a Sealing Shuriken and a bag who can devour victims' dreams and ambitions. After being defeated by Aka Ninger Chozetsu and Star Ninger, Baku is enlarged before he is killed by Lion HaOh. Baku is voiced by Shinya Fukumatsu (ふくまつ 進紗, Fukumatsu Shin'ya).
- Nurikabe (ヌリカベ): A Yokai that Kyuemon created from a Sealing Shuriken and a boom barrier who can trap victims within walls that represent obstacles in their lives. After being defeated by Aka Ninger Chozetsu, Ao Ninger, and Star Ninger, Nurikabe is enlarged before he is killed by HaOh Shurikenzin. Nurikabe is voiced by Yasuhiko Kawazu (川津 泰彦, Kawazu Yasuhiko).
- Yuki-onna (ユキオンナ): A Yokai that Kyuemon created from a Sealing Shuriken and a kakigōri maker who wields the Hyotenka (氷天下, Hyōtenka; Sub-Zero World) naginata. After being defeated by Aka Ninger Chozetsu and Ki and Momo Ninger, Yuki-onna is enlarged before she is killed by HaOh Shurikenzin. Yuki-onna is voiced by Kimiko Saitō (斉藤 貴美子, Saitō Kimiko).
- Mataneko (マタネコ): A Yokai created from a Sealing Shuriken and a stopwatch who resembles Nekomata but lacks his powers. He poses as Yoshitaka in the hopes of separating the Ninningers and killing them individually until he is exposed by Momo Ninger. After stealing Kyuemon's mallet, Mataneko enlarges himself and Aka Ninger Chozetsu, but is killed by the latter. Mataneko is voiced by Tomokazu Seki.
- Mokumokuren (モクモクレン): A Yokai that Masakage created from a Sealing Shuriken and a computer keyboard. After being defeated by Ki Ninger, Mokumokuren is enlarged before he is killed by Gekiatsu DaiOh. Mokumokuren is voiced by Kenichirou Matsuda (松田 健一郎, Matsuda Kenichirō).
- Amikiri (アミキリ): A Yokai that Masakage created from a Sealing Shuriken and a Swiss Army knife. After being defeated by Ao Ninger Chozetsu, Amikiri is enlarged before he is killed by HaOh Gekiatsu DaiOh. Amikiri is voiced by Setsuji Satō (佐藤 せつじ, Satō Setsuji).
- Fudagaeshi (フダガエシ): A Yokai created from a Sealing Shuriken and Shurikenger's Yokai Karuta. Fudagaeshi is killed by Aka Ninger Chozetsu. Fudagaeshi is voiced by Keiichi Sonobe (園部 啓一, Sonobe Keiichi).

===== Western Yokai =====
The Three Western Yokai (西洋三大妖怪, Seiyō San-dai Yōkai) are a trio of Yokai who flourished in western civilizations, having terrorized Europe and America before they are summoned to Japan by Ariake no Kata.

- Franken (フランケン, Furanken): The flashlight-themed Ace of the Three Western Yokai who can fire a beam from his abdomen capable of stopping a machine's movement. After being defeated by Aka Ninger Chozetsu and Ki and Momo Ninger, Franken is enlarged by Kyuemon before he is killed by HaOh Shurikenzin. Franken is voiced by Kiyoyuki Yanada (梁田 清之, Yanada Kiyoyuki).
- Dracula (ドラキュラ, Dorakyura): The syringe-themed King of the Three Western Yokai who wields the FenSyring (フェンシリング, Fenshiringu) rapier. Having transcended his vulnerability to sunlight and bloodthirst, Dracula now has the ability to turn into a swarm of bats and absorb his victims' life energy via bites, leaving them in a permanent, nightmare-filled slumber. After being defeated by Aka Ninger Chozetsu, Shiro Ninger, and Star Ninger, Dracula is enlarged by Kyuemon before he is killed by Lion HaOh. Dracula is voiced by Atsushi Imaruoka (伊丸岡 篤, Imaruoka Atsushi).
- Okami-otoko (オオカミオトコ, Ōkami-otoko): The kitchen knife-themed Joker of the Three Western Yokai who is invulnerable against human attacks and has killed many Yokai Hunters, including Kinji's father and older brother. After he is defeated by Star Ninger Chozetsu, Okami-otoko is enlarged by Kyuemon before he is killed by HaOh Shurikenzin. Okami-otoko is voiced by Takahiro Fujimoto (藤本 たかひろ, Fujimoto Takahiro).

===== Advanced Yokai =====
The Advanced Yokai (上級妖怪, Jōkyū Yōkai) are Yokai created from two tainted Sealing Shuriken coming into contact with an item instead of one. Stronger than ordinary Yokai, they also have the ability to enlarge themselves without Kyuemon's help.

- Nue (ヌエ): An Advanced Yokai that Gengetsu created from two Sealing Shuriken and a toolbox. After he is defeated by Aka Ninger Chozetsu, Nue enlarges himself before he is killed by Lion HaOh. Nue is voiced by Masami Iwasaki (岩崎 征実, Iwasaki Masami).
- Konaki-jiji (コナキジジイ): An Advanced Yokai that Masakage created from two Sealing Shuriken and a dumbbell who is equipped with a pair of Tekken Arei (鉄拳アレイ; Iron Fist Dumbbell) gauntlets. After he is defeated by Aka Ninger Chozetsu, Konaki-jiji enlarges himself before he is killed by Gekiatsu DaiOh. Konaki-jiji is voiced by Issei Futamata (二又 一成, Futamata Issei).
- Ōmukade (オオムカデ): An Advanced Yokai that Masakage created from two Sealing Shuriken and a power strip. After being defeated by Ki Ninger Chozetsu, Ōmukade enlarges himself before he is killed by Gekiatsu DaiOh. Ōmukade is voiced by Takashi Nagasako (長嶝 高士, Nagasako Takashi).
- Oboroguruma (オボログルマ): An Advanced Yokai that Masakage created from two Sealing Shuriken and six Gashadokuro who possesses the head-mounted OboRocket (朧決闘, Oboroketto) cannon and the OboRoller (朧往来, Oborōrā). After being defeated by Super Star Ninger, Oboroguruma enlarges himself and allows Masakage to pilot him before he is killed by HaOh Gekiatsu DaiOh. Kyuemon later creates Oboroguruma Mark II (オボログルマ マークII, Oboroguruma Māku Tsū) for Raizo Gabi to pilot, though it is eventually destroyed by Gekiatsu DaiOh. Oboroguruma is voiced by Kazuki Yao (矢尾 一樹, Yao Kazuki).
- Binbogami (ビンボウガミ, Binbōgami): An Advanced Yokai that Masakage created from two Sealing Shuriken and a Christmas stocking. After being defeated by Aka Ninger Chozetsu, Binbogami enlarges himself before he is killed by the Ninningers' primary Otomonin, Paonmaru, UFOmaru, and Surfermaru. Binbogami is voiced by Hiroshi Iwasaki (岩崎 ひろし, Iwasaki Hiroshi).
- Shuten-doji (シュテンドウジ, Shuten-dōji): A Super Advanced Yokai (超上級妖怪, Chō Jōkyū Yōkai) that Mangetsu created from four Sealing Shuriken and a Kibaoni Army Corps nobori who wields the Kiben Jindokubo (鬼便神毒棒, Kiben Jindokubō; Evil God-Poison Club) kanabō. Shuten-doji enlarges himself before he is killed by Gekiatsu DaiOh. Shuten-doji is voiced by Yōsuke Akimoto (秋元 羊介, Akimoto Yōsuke).

===== Other Yokai =====
- Buruburu (ブルブル): A Yokai-Roidmude hybrid created from a Sealing Shuriken that Roidmude 089 and Kyuemon created from a Sealing Shuriken and a Spider Viral Core who dual wields a pair of swords, can secrete a slimy goo capable of instilling fear in whoever comes in contact with it, and producing a Heavy Acceleration field and appears exclusively in the two-part Shuriken Sentai Ninninger vs. Kamen Rider Drive: Spring Break Combined 1 Hour Special. Buruburu is killed by the Ninningers and Kamen Riders Drive and Mach before Kyuemon gives the Sealing Shuriken to 089. Buruburu is voiced by Yūji Kishi (岸 祐二, Kishi Yūji).
- Wanyudo (ワニュウドウ, Wanyūdō): A Yokai created from a Sealing Shuriken and a Cryner who can turn himself into the Yokai Ressha (妖怪烈車, Yōkai Ressha) train and appears exclusively in the crossover film Shuriken Sentai Ninninger vs. ToQger the Movie: Ninja in Wonderland. He is killed by the Zyuohgers. Wanyudo is voiced by Jūrōta Kosugi (小杉 十郎太, Kosugi Jūrōta).

==== Oniwaban Five ====
The Oniwaban Five (御庭番五人衆, Oniwaban Gonin Shū; Oniwaban Five People) is a group of Kibaoni-Style Ninja (牙鬼流忍者, Kibaoni-ryū Ninja) who were sealed within the Kibaoni family scrolls before four of them are revived by Kyuemon as Izayoi-Style Ninja (十六夜流忍者, Izayoi-ryū Ninja) to serve under him. Similarly to the Ninningers, they wield the Ninja Hyakuyotou (忍邪百妖刀, Ninja Hyakuyōtō; Evil Ninja Hundred Bewitching Sword) ninjatō, which allows them to perform attacks via the Yo Shuriken, and each possess a Core Gear (コア歯車, Koa Haguruma).

- Hayabusa (ハヤブサ): A falcon-themed ninja who is defeated by the Ninningers, enlarged by Kyuemon, and killed by King Shurikenzin and Lion HaOh. Hayabusa is voiced by Hiromu Miyazaki (宮崎 寛務, Miyazaki Hiromu).
- Ikkakusai (イッカクサイ): An Indian rhinoceros-themed ninja who wields the twin Saikaku Sai (犀角釵; Rhinoceros Horn Sai). After being defeated by the Ninningers, Ikkakusai is enlarged before he is killed by HaOh Shurikenzin. Ikkakusai is voiced by Taketora (武虎).
- Kuroari (クロアリ): A black carpenter ant-themed ninja who possesses the left arm-mounted Abe Kote (悪兵籠手; Evil Soldier Gauntlet) pincer. After being defeated by Aka Ninger Chozetsu, Kuroari is enlarged before he is killed by King Shurikenzin and Lion HaOh. Kuroari is voiced by Kenji Hamada (浜田 賢二, Hamada Kenji).
- Mujina (ムジナ): A badger-themed ninja who wields a teapot-esque kusarigama equipped with a bladed shield. After being defeated by the primary Ninningers, Mujina steals Kyuemon's mallet to enlarge himself before he is killed by the Karakuri Kyubi. Mujina is voiced by Taiten Kusunoki (楠 大典, Kusunoki Taiten).
- Suzumebachi (スズメバチ): A hornet-themed ninja who is revived by Masakage and possesses a left arm-mounted crossbow capable of firing Asashin (暗殺針; Assassin's Needle) arrows. After being defeated by Ao Ninger, Suzumebachi is enlarged before she is killed by Gekiatsu DaiOh. Suzumebachi is voiced by Kanae Oki (沖 佳苗, Oki Kanae).

=== Tsumuji Igasaki ===
Tsumuji Igasaki (伊賀崎 旋風, Igasaki Tsumuji) is Takaharu and Fuka's father and Yoshitaka's oldest son who trained since childhood to succeed his father. After Kyuemon steals his Nintality, Tsumuji creates the Ninja Ichibantou and serves as an advisor and teacher to the Ninningers, who eventually reclaim Tsumuji's powers and allow him to join them in their final battle against the Kibaoni forces as his own version of Aka Ninger.

Tsumuji Igasaki is portrayed by Toshihiro Yashiba (矢柴 俊博, Yashiba Toshihiro). As a teenager, Tsumuji is portrayed by Shogo Kaya (萱 翔悟, Kaya Shōgo).

=== Yoshitaka Igasaki ===
Yoshitaka Igasaki (伊賀崎 好天, Igasaki Yoshitaka), also known as the "Last Ninja" (ラストニンジャ, Rasuto Ninja), is the primary Ninningers' grandfather who has a penchant for incorporating Italian phrases in his speech. Decades prior, he gave his life to seal Gengetsu Kibaoni when the latter became an oni. However, Yoshitaka used the End Shuriken to keep himself alive so he could secretly build the Otomonin using alien technology in preparation for Gengetsu's return before revealing himself to his grandchildren in the present to give them their Otomonin Shuriken; claiming he had faked his death so he can guide them towards becoming true ninja. Additionally, he single-handedly builds a new Igasaki Ninjutsu Dojo (伊賀崎忍術道場, Igasaki Ninjutsu Dōjō) following the original one's destruction to serve as the Ninningers' headquarters. While training his grandchildren, he promises to eventually choose one of them to become his successor if they exceed his expectations, improve their Nintality, and fully master the Shuriken Ninja Arts. However, he later reveals they can only do so if one of them kills him and absorbs his Nintality. After they demonstrate their conviction to surpass him, he acknowledges and joins forces with the Ninningers in their final battle against Gengetsu as his own version of Aka Ninger until Kyuemon Izayoi steals Yoshitaka's Nintality, forcing Yoshitaka to reveal the truth of what happened. Before he dies, Yoshitaka gives a purified Sealing Shuriken to Kyuemon, which transforms into his own Nin Shuriken.

Yoshitaka Igasaki is portrayed by Takashi Sasano (笹野 高史, Sasano Takashi) while his eldest son, Shota Sasano (ささの 翔太, Sasano Shōta), portrays a younger Yoshitaka.

=== Tetsunosuke Saika XXII ===
Tetsunosuke Saika XXII (二十二代目 雑賀 鉄之助, Nijūni-daime Saika Tetsunosuke) is a karakuri technician and son of Tetsunosuke Saika XXI who helped Yoshitaka create the Otomonin. After succeeding his father, Saika XXII performs maintenance on the Ninningers' equipment. He would later create the Chozetsu Shobu Changer and help the Ninningers create their secondary Otomonin.

Tetsunosuke Saika XXII is portrayed by Mizuki Itagaki (板垣 瑞生, Itagaki Mizuki).

== Guest characters ==
- Harukaze Kato (加藤 春風, Katō Harukaze): Yakumo's mother, Tsumuji's older sister, and a fashion designer who initially disapproves of her son's involvement with ninjutsu before seeing him in battle. Harukaze Kato is portrayed by Yuko Ito (伊藤 裕子, Itō Yūko).
- Toha Yamaji (山地 闘破, Yamaji Tōha): A descendant of the ancient Togakure-ryū (戸隠流) ninja clan who can transform into the armored ninja Jiraiya (磁雷矢). After initially being mistaken for one of Kyuemon's ninjas, Yamaji joins forces with the Ninningers to fight Konaki-jiji before Takaharu convinces him to retire and allow the next generation of ninjas to take the lead against the forces of evil. Toha Yamaji is portrayed by Takumi Tsutsui (筒井 巧, Tsutsui Takumi), who reprises his role from Sekai Ninja Sen Jiraiya.

=== Returning characters ===
- Sasuke (サスケ): A descendant of Sarutobi Sasuke who served as Ninja Red (ニンジャレッド, Ninja Reddo), second-in-command of the 18th Super Sentai team, Ninja Sentai Kakuranger. He and Yousuke Shiina appear before the Ninningers to train them and protect Takaharu from Nekomata. Sasuke is portrayed by Teruaki Ogawa (小川 輝晃, Ogawa Teruaki), who reprises his role from Ninja Sentai Kakuranger.
- Yousuke Shiina (椎名 鷹介, Shiina Yōsuke): A ninja from Hayate Way's Ninja Academy who served as Hurricane Red (ハリケンレッド, Hariken Reddo), leader of the 26th Super Sentai team, Ninpuu Sentai Hurricaneger. He and Sasuke appear before the Ninningers to train them and protect Takaharu from Nekomata. Yousuke Shiina is portrayed by Shun Shioya (塩谷 瞬, Shioya Shun), who reprises his role from Ninpuu Sentai Hurricaneger.
- Tsubasa Ozu (小津 翼, Ozu Tsubasa): A magician who served as Magi Yellow (マジイエロー, Maji Ierō), second-in-command of the 29th Super Sentai team, Mahō Sentai Magiranger. He is also Yakumo's magic teacher during his stay in England. Tsubasa Ozu is portrayed by Hiroya Matsumoto (松本 寛也, Matsumoto Hiroya), who reprises his role from Mahō Sentai Magiranger.
- Shurikenger (シュリケンジャー, Shurikenjā): An ally of the Hurricanegers who Toha Yamaji sent to check on the Ninningers' progress. Shurikenger is voiced by Taiki Matsuno (松野 太紀, Matsuno Taiki), who reprises his role from Ninpuu Sentai Hurricaneger.

== Spin-off characters ==
- Tatsunosuke Hakkaku (八角 辰之助, Hakkaku Tatsunosuke): The lord of Shinobigakure Castle (忍隠れ城, Shinobigakure-jō; Hidden Ninja Castle) of Shinobigakure Village (忍隠れの里, Shinobigakure no Sato; Hidden Ninja Village) who appears exclusively in the film Shuriken Sentai Ninninger the Movie: The Dinosaur Lord's Splendid Ninja Scroll!. He originally cared for his subjects, but abandoned his family, which led to him being cursed to transform into a giant, anthropomorphic dinosaur-esque form called the "terrible dragon" after succumbing to his greed, anxiety, and fear. In the present, the Ninningers shrink him to human size as part of their summer homework. Tatsunosuke later joins the Ninningers in protecting his village from Juza Yumihari, which allows him to break the curse with Takaharu's help. Tatsunosuke Hakkaku is portrayed by Toshifumi Fujimoto (藤本 敏史, Fujimoto Toshifumi) of FUJIWARA.
- Juza Yumihari (弓張 重三, Yumihari Jūza): The samurai-themed general of the Kibaoni Army Corps and mentor of Raizo Gabi who wields a bladed bow that can be separated into twin swords and can perform the Art of Shooting (射法, Shahō), Falling Moon Flower (散月花, Sangekka), Early Summer Rain (五月雨, Samidare), and Hypertrophic Fast Growth Yojutsu spells. First appearing in the film Shuriken Sentai Ninninger the Movie: The Dinosaur Lord's Splendid Ninja Scroll!, he attacks Shinobigakure Village to find the "terrible dragon", only to be thwarted by the Ninningers. He enlarges himself, but is killed by Shurikenzin Dino. Two years later, during the events of the V-Cinema, Come Back! Shuriken Sentai Ninninger: Ninnin Girls vs. Boys FINAL WARS, Yumihari returns from the dead to seek revenge on the Ninningers. Nonetheless, he is killed by the Ninnin Girls. Juza Yumihari is voiced by Hiroki Tōchi (東地 宏樹, Tōchi Hiroki).
- Sakurako Igasaki (伊賀崎 桜子, Igasaki Sakurako): Takaharu and Fuka's mother, Tsumuji's wife, and a ninja fanatic who appears exclusively in the V-Cinema Come Back! Shuriken Sentai Ninninger: Ninnin Girls vs. Boys FINAL WARS. She turns Fuka, Kasumi, and Luna Kokonoe into the Ninnin Girls (ニンニンガールズ, Ninnin Gāruzu) idol group to challenge the male Ninningers. Sakurako Igasaki is portrayed by Shinobu Nakayama (中山 忍, Nakayama Shinobu).
- Luna Kokonoe (九重 ルナ, Kokonoe Runa): A young woman who was recruited into Sakurako's Ninnin Girls as the green-colored Mido Ninger (ミドニンジャー, Mido Ninjā), only to be possessed by Kyuemon Izayoi after receiving his Nin Shuriken, and appears exclusively in the V-Cinema Come Back! Shuriken Sentai Ninninger: Ninnin Girls vs. Boys FINAL WARS. Luna Kokonoe is portrayed by Megumi Han, who also voices Kyuemon Izayoi.
- Yoshiharu Igasaki (伊賀崎 快晴, Igasaki Yoshiharu): Takaharu's son from 12 years in the future and successor as Aka Ninger who appears exclusively in the crossover film Doubutsu Sentai Zyuohger vs. Ninninger the Movie: Super Sentai's Message from the Future. Yoshiharu uses his ninja powers to travel back in time to the present and avert the Ninningers and Zyuohgers' deaths. Yoshiharu Igasaki is portrayed by Tatsuki Ishikawa (石川 樹, Ishikawa Tatsuki).
