= Mokumokuren =

Yōkai

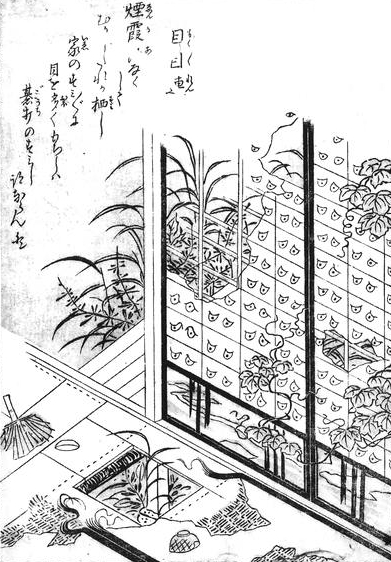
The mokumokuren as illustrated by Toriyama Sekien

Mokumokuren (目目連 or 目々連) are yōkai in Japanese mythology.

== Mythology ==
The Mokumokuren usually lives in torn shoji (Japanese paper sliding walls), although they can also be found in tatami floor mats and in walls. The name "Mokumokuren" literally means "many eyes" or "continuous eyes". The Mokumokuren is considered by the Japanese to be one of the traditional inhabitants of haunted houses.

The only way to remove the spirit from the wall is to patch up the holes in it.

Mokumokuren are said to be an invention of Toriyama Sekien.

== Legends ==
A stingy traveling merchant once tried to save money by sleeping in an abandoned house rather than sleeping in an inn. Waking in the middle of the night, he was confronted by an (almost) entire shoji screen staring down at him. Instead of becoming scared, he removed the eyeballs from the screen and sold them to a local eye surgeon.

In another story, a traveler was determined to remain in the same house as a Mokumokuren, attempting to ignore it by wrapping the blanket he had been sleeping beneath tightly around his head. When he awoke, he discovered that his eyeballs had been removed, and were nowhere to be found.

== In popular culture ==
The Pokémon Stakataka is based on the Mokumokuren.

Mokumokuren is used as a mononym by the mangaka that created The Summer Hikaru Died.

== See also ==
- Gazu Hyakki Yagyō
