= Come Back! Shuriken Sentai Ninninger: Ninnin Girls vs. Boys FINAL WARS =

- Theatrical poster

Japanese name
- Kanji: 帰ってきた手裏剣戦隊ニンニンジャー ニンニンガールズVSボーイズ FINAL WARS
Transcriptions
- Revised Hepburn: Kaettekita Shuriken Sentai Ninninjā Ninnin Gāruzu Tai Bōizu Fainaru Wōzu
- Directed by: Noboru Takemoto
- Written by: Kento Shimoyama
- Based on: Shuriken Sentai Ninninger by Kento Shimoyama
- Produced by: Shōjirō Nakazawa
- Starring: Shunsuke Nishikawa; Gaku Matsumoto; Kaito Nakamura; Yuuka Yano; Kasumi Yamaya; Hideya Tawada; Megumi Han
- Narrated by: Tsutomu Tareki
- Cinematography: Shingo Ōsawa
- Edited by: Kazuko Yanagisawa
- Music by: Kousuke Yamashita
- Production companies: Toei; TV Asahi; Bandai Visual
- Distributed by: Toei Video
- Release date: June 22, 2016 (Japan)
- Running time: 55 minutes
- Country: Japan
- Language: Japanese

Come Back! Shuriken Sentai Ninninger: Ninnin Girls vs. Boys FINAL WARS (帰ってきた手裏剣戦隊ニンニンジャー ニンニンガールズVSボーイズ FINAL WARS, Kaettekita Shuriken Sentai Ninninjā Ninnin Gāruzu Tai Bōizu Fainaru Wōzu) is a Japanese film serving as the direct-to-video conclusion of the 2015 Super Sentai television series Shuriken Sentai Ninninger. It was released on June 22, 2016, The film is written by television series screenwriter Kento Shimoyama.

== Story ==
Two years after Gengetsu Kibaoni's defeat, the Ninningers gather at the dojo to see each other's progress in getting stronger. In the occasion, Takaharu and the other male Ninningers confront remnants of the Kibaoni Army that appear, but the enemies are easily defeated by Fuka and Kasumi, who are now known as the "Ninnin Girls", a duo of "idol ninja" managed by no other than Fuka and Takaharu's mother, Sakurako Igasaki, who also happens to be a well known producer. To bolster the girls' career, Sakurako claims that she trademarked the words "Last Ninja" and "Igasaki Style", and forbids the male Ninningers from use them in public. When Takaharu and the others refuse, she challenges them to a contest between the boys and the girls, with the male Ninningers' equipments and Nin Shuriken at stake. Meanwhile, in the afterlife, Ariake no Kata, taking heed of the dispute between the Igasaki Ninjas, decides to use this as an opportunity to have her revenge on them while reviving and having her son Mangetsu becoming the leader of Kibaoni Army.

Before the match between the Ninnin Girls and the Ninnin Boys (as Sakurako calls them), the girls gain a new member called Luna Kokonoe, who uses Kyuemon's Nin Shuriken to transform into MidoNinger, while Tsumuji joins the girls as AkaNinger to even their numbers while seeking to impress his wife as well. With some external interference, Kasumi defeats Yakumo, Nagi defeats Tsumuji, Kinji defeats Luna and Fuka defeats Takaharu. With both sides with two victories each, a final round is held with both sides fighting using their Otomonin. The Ninnin Girls use Shurikenzin Dino and Gekiatsu Daioh while the Ninnin Boys use the Bison King and Lion Haoh but another sabotage leads the Ninnin Girls to victory. The male Niningers surrender their gear according to the deal, but confide among themselves that they realized that their match was fixed.

In the next day, the Ninnin Girls encounter Ariake who brings in the revived Juza Yumihari. In the occasion, Ariake reveals the sabotages they made during the match, causing Fuka to lose her composure making her believe that she did not properly defeated Takaharu. When the Ninnin Girls are seemingly killed by the two Yokai, Sakurako fall into despair and her fear revives Mangetsu Kibaoni. As Juza proceeds to kill Sakurako, the male Ninningers arrive to protect her and both Fuka and Kasumi appear in sequence, revealing that they had feigned their deaths and together they destroy Juza. Luna joins the battle as well, and it is revealed that all this time she was possessed by the spirit of Kyuemon, who intends to fight by the Ninningers' side to redeem himself.

The male Ninningers regain their equipment and joins the female Ninningers against the revived Kibaoni Army and their Yokai forces. With Mangetsu and Ariake left, they quickly perform a tag-team attack before delivering the final blow, effectively ending the Kibaoni Army's resurrection. With the battle ended, Kyuemon finally is able to reincarnate and leaves Luna's body for the afterlife. After sending their prayers to their late grandfather, Kasumi announces her graduation from the Ninnin Girls and returns to her research, having joined as an idol only to help Fuka grow up. Nagi takes this opening to become Fuka and Luna's new producer and the Ninningers split up once again to follow their respective paths before promising to regroup once more to report on each other's progress.

== Cast ==
- Takaharu Igasaki (伊賀崎 天晴, Igasaki Takaharu): Shunsuke Nishikawa (西川 俊介, Nishikawa Shunsuke)
- Yakumo Kato (加藤 八雲, Katō Yakumo): Gaku Matsumoto (松本 岳, Matsumoto Gaku)
- Nagi Matsuo (松尾 凪, Matsuo Nagi): Kaito Nakamura (中村 嘉惟人, Nakamura Kaito)
- Fuka Igasaki (伊賀崎 風花, Igasaki Fūka): Yuuka Yano (矢野 優花, Yano Yūka)
- Kasumi Momochi (百地 霞, Momochi Kasumi): Kasumi Yamaya (山谷 花純, Yamaya Kasumi)
- Kinji Takigawa (キンジ・タキガワ): Hideya Tawada (多和田 秀弥, Tawada Hideya)
- Luna Kokonoe (九重 ルナ, Kokonoe Runa), Kyuemon Izayoi (十六夜 九衛門, Izayoi Kyūemon; Voice): Megumi Han (潘 めぐみ, Han Megumi)
- Tsumuji Igasaki (伊賀崎 旋風, Igasaki Tsumuji): Toshihiro Yashiba (矢柴 俊博, Yashiba Toshihiro).
- Sakurako Igasaki (伊賀崎 桜子, Igasaki Sakurako): Shinobu Nakayama (中山 忍, Nakayama Shinobu)
- Ariake no Kata (有明の方; Voice): Kotono Mitsuishi (三石 琴乃, Mitsuishi Kotono)
- Mangetsu Kibaoni (牙鬼 萬月, Kibaoni Mangetsu; Voice): Ryōtarō Okiayu (置鮎 龍太郎, Okiayu Ryōtarō)
- Juza Yumihari (弓張 重三, Yumihari Jūza; Voice): Hiroki Tōchi (東地 宏樹, Tōchi Hiroki)
- Ninninger Equipment Voice: Tsutomu Tareki (垂木 勉, Tareki Tsutomu)
