= Doubutsu Sentai Zyuohger vs. Ninninger the Movie: Super Sentai's Message from the Future =

- Theatrical poster
- Kanji: 劇場版 動物戦隊ジュウオウジャーVSニンニンジャー 未来からのメッセージfromスーパー戦隊
- Directed by: Noboru Takemoto
- Written by: Junko Kōmura
- Produced by: Motoi Sasaki (TV Asahi); Chihiro Inoue (TV Asahi); Naomi Takebe (Toei); Takaaki Utsunomiya (Toei); Takashi Mochizuki (Toei); Gō Wakabayashi (Toei); Hiroaki Shibata (Toei); Kōichi Yada (Toei Agency); Akihiro Fukada (Toei Agency)
- Starring: Masaki Nakao; Miki Yanagi; Shohei Nanba; Tsurugi Watanabe; Haruka Tateishi; Naoki Kunishima; Shunsuke Nishikawa; Gaku Matsumoto; Kaito Nakamura; Yuuka Yano; Kasumi Yamaya; Hideya Tawada
- Music by: Koichiro Kameyama; Kousuke Yamashita
- Production company: Toei Company
- Distributed by: Toei Company
- Release date: January 14, 2017
- Running time: 64 min
- Country: Japan
- Language: Japanese

Doubutsu Sentai Zyuohger vs. Ninninger the Movie: Super Sentai's Message from the Future from Super Sentai (劇場版 動物戦隊ジュウオウジャーVSニンニンジャー 未来からのメッセージfromスーパー戦隊, Dōbutsu Sentai Jūōjā Tai Ninninjā Mirai kara no Messēji Furomu Sūpā Sentai) is the title for the "VS" team-up movie between Doubutsu Sentai Zyuohger and Shuriken Sentai Ninninger, including the debut appearance of the main cast of Uchu Sentai Kyuranger. The film premiered in Japanese theaters on January 14, 2017. The film also features Daisuke Shima, reprising his role as Yusuke Amamiya/Red Falcon from Choujyu Sentai Liveman.

== Plot ==
The film begins with a boy named Yoshiharu Igasaki desperate at the sight of both the Zyuohgers and the Ninningers apparently dead. Back to the previous day, Yamato, Sela, Leo, Tusk and Amu are camping beside a river when they are attacked by Takaharu, Yakumo, Nagi, Fuuka and Kasumi, who mistaken them for evil Youkai. After a vicious battle between both Sentai teams, Yamato and Takaharu get stranded while the other four Ninningers return home to meet Runrun, an alien who claims that the Zyuohgers pretended to be her tribe's friends before betraying and killing all her companions, but is actually Gilmarda, an assassin hired by Naria in disguise, instigating them against the Zyuohgers, while using his pollen to jam all communications in the vicinity. Meanwhile, Takararu and Yamato's fight is interrupted by Yoshiharu, Takararu's son who came from the future to prevent the Zyuohgers and the Ninningers from killing each other and ending the history of Super Sentai.

Not meeting his friends at the campsite, Misao returns to Uncle Mario's house where he is abducted by the other Ninningers and Runrun uses some vines and a mask to restrain him, while the other Zyuohgers encounter Kinji, and after learning that he is also a Ninninger and that Misao was taken by the others, capture him as well. Back at the Ninningers' house, the mask in Misao's mouth speaks with his voice to Yakumo and the others to incriminate him, and he desperately looks for a way to convey the truth to them. In the next day, the six Zyuohgers and six Ninningers gather at a stadium and their confrontation apparently leads to their deaths, before a desperate Yoshiharu, but a triumphant Runrun is surprised when learning that it was all an illusion cast by the Ninningers, who reveal that Misao used his butt to instruct the other Ninningers to remove his mask and learn the truth from him, leading them to apologize to the Zyuohgers and together, they devised a plan to get back on Runrun's trickery.

Exposed, Gilmarda removes his disguise and creates copies of Bangray, Jagged, Gengetsu Kibaoni, Raizo Gabi and Masakage Tsugomori to fight the Ninningers and the Zyuohgers, who transform to fight back. Zyuoh Eagle and Akaninger have a hard time against the Gengetsu clone, until Yoshiharu and Tsumuji appear to help them. In the occasion, a sealing shuriken appears and transforms into a Nin Shuriken for Yoshiharu to use. Yoshiharu, his father and grandfather then transform into Akaninger to face Gengetsu, while Zyuoh Eagle chases after Gilmarda. Naria brings Azald and Quval to assist Gilmarda, but Bud appears to stand in their way, when the Kyurangers suddenly arrive and drive the three villains away. After the Kyurangers leave, Bud concludes that their appearance is a sign that history was successfully restored, allowing the legacy of Super Sentai to continue.

With the clones destroyed, the Ninningers and Zyuohgers join forces to defeat Gilmarda, who enlarges himself with some Continue Medals and decides to destroy the whole planet. The two sentai then form Wild Tousai Dodeka King and King Shurikenzin to fight Gilmarda, but the enemy easily overpowers them. Just as the heroes are about to be killed, they have a vision of the previous 38 Red Sentai, who bestow them the power to form Wild Tousai Shuriken King, that infused with the power of all the Super Sentai, destroys Gilmarda once and for all. Having prevented his father's death, Yoshiharu bids farewell to him and his friends before returning to the future. As the others wonder how Yoshiharu came to exist since his father should be already dead, Takaharu deduces that his new wife must be already pregnant, revealing that he has just married, a fact that astonishes even his own family, who was unaware of it.

== Cast ==
- Yamato Kazakiri (風切 大和, Kazakiri Yamato): Masaki Nakao (中尾 暢樹, Nakao Masaki)
- Sela (セラ): Miki Yanagi (柳 美稀, Yanagi Miki)
- Leo (レオ): Shohei Nanba (南羽 翔平, Nanba Shōhei)
- Tusk (タスク): Tsurugi Watanabe (渡邉 剣, Watanabe Tsurugi)
- Amu (アム): Haruka Tateishi (立石 晴香, Tateishi Haruka)
- Misao Mondo (門藤 操, Mondō Misao): Naoki Kunishima (國島 直希, Kunishima Naoki)
- Takaharu Igasaki (伊賀崎 天晴, Igasaki Takaharu): Shunsuke Nishikawa (西川 俊介, Nishikawa Shunsuke)
- Yakumo Kato (加藤 八雲, Katō Yakumo): Gaku Matsumoto (松本 岳, Matsumoto Gaku)
- Nagi Matsuo (松尾 凪, Matsuo Nagi): Kaito Nakamura (中村 嘉惟人, Nakamura Kaito)
- Fuka Igasaki (伊賀崎 風花, Igasaki Fūka): Yuuka Yano (矢野 優花, Yano Yuka)
- Kasumi Momochi (百地 霞, Momochi Kasumi): Kasumi Yamaya (山谷 花純, Yamaya Kasumi)
- Kinji Takigawa (キンジ・タキガワ): Hideya Tawada (多和田 秀弥, Tawada Hideya)
- Bud (バド, Bado): Kohei Murakami (村上 幸平, Murakami Kōhei)
- Yoshiharu Igasaki (伊賀崎 快晴, Igasaki Yoshiharu): Tatsuki Ishikawa (石川 樹, Ishikawa Tatsuki)
- Tsumuji Igasaki (伊賀崎 旋風, Igasaki Tsumuji): Toshihiro Yashiba (矢柴 俊博, Yashiba Toshihiro)
- Mario Mori (森 真理夫, Mori Mario): Susumu Terajima (寺島 進, Terajima Susumu)

=== Voice Cast ===
- Runrun (ルンルン): Haruka Fukuhara (福原 遥, Fukuhara Haruka)
- Gillmarda (ギルマーダ, Girumāda): Nozomu Sasaki (佐々木 望, Sasaki Nozomu)
- Azald (アザルド, Azarudo): Jouji Nakata (中田 譲治, Nakata Jōji)
- Quval (クバル, Kubaru): Mitsuo Iwata (岩田 光央, Iwata Mitsuo)
- Naria (ナリア): Minako Kotobuki (寿 美菜子, Kotobuki Minako)
- Rhino Man (犀男, Sai-otoko): Volcano Ōta (ボルケーノ太田, Borukēno Ōta)
- Crocodile Man (鰐男, Wani-otoko): Mitsuaki Kanuka (かぬか 光明, Kanuka Mitsuaki)
- Wolf Man (狼男, Ōkami-otoko): Hidenori Takahashi (高橋 英則, Takahashi Hidenori)
- Shishi Red (シシレッド, Shishi Reddo): Takumi Kizu (岐洲 匠, Kizu Takumi)
- Sasori Orange (サソリオレンジ, Sasori Orenji): Yosuke Kishi (岸 洋佑, Kishi Yōsuke)
- Ookami Blue (オオカミブルー, Ōkami Burū): Kazuya Nakai (中井 和哉, Nakai Kazuya)
- Tenbin Gold (テンビンゴールド, Tenbin Gōrudo): Yūki Ono (小野 友樹, Ono Yūki)
- Oushi Black (オウシブラック, Oushi Burakku): Akio Ōtsuka (大塚 明夫, Ōtsuka Akio)
- Hebitsukai Silver (ヘビツカイシルバー, Hebitsukai Shirubā): Taiki Yamazaki (山崎 大輝, Yamazaki Taiki)
- Chameleon Green (カメレオングリーン, Kamereon Gurīn): Sakurako Okubo (大久保 桜子, Ōkubo Sakurako)
- Washi Pink (ワシピンク, Washi Pinku): M·A·O
- Kajiki Yellow (カジキイエロー, Kajiki Ierō): Tetsuji Sakakibara (榊原 徹士, Sakakibara Tetsuji)
- Zyuohger Equipment Voice: Chō (チョー)
- Ninninger Equipment Voice: Tsutomu Tareki (垂木 勉, Tareki Tsutomu)
- Kyuranger Equipment Voice: Subaru Kimura (木村 昴, Kimura Subaru)
- Red Falcon (レッドファルコン, Reddo Farukon): Daisuke Shima (嶋 大輔, Shima Daisuke)

== Theme song ==
- "Let's! Zyuoh Dance with Ninja" (レッツ! ジュウオウダンス with NINJA, Rettsu! Jūō Dansu Wizu Ninja)
  - Lyrics: Shoko Fujibayashi (藤林 聖子, Fujibayashi Shōko)
  - Composition & Arrangement: Takayoshi Tanimoto (谷本 貴義, Tanimoto Takayoshi) (Project.R)
  - Artist: Yohei Onishi (大西 洋平, Ōnishi Yōhei) (Project.R)
  - Chorus: Young Fresh
