= Shuriken Sentai Ninninger the Movie: The Dinosaur Lord's Splendid Ninja Scroll! =

Shuriken Sentai Ninninger the Movie The Dinosaur Lord's Splendid Ninja Scroll!
- Japanese Film poster

Japanese name
- Kanji: 手裏剣戦隊ニンニンジャー THE MOVIE 恐竜殿さまアッパレ忍法帖！
Transcriptions
- Revised Hepburn: Shuriken Sentai Ninninjā Za Mūbī Kyōryū Tono-sama Appare Ninpōchō!
- Directed by: Shōjirō Nakazawa
- Written by: Kento Shimoyama
- Based on: Shuriken Sentai Ninninger by Kento Shimoyama
- Produced by: Motoi Sasaki (TV Asahi); Chihiro Inoue (TV Asahi); Naomi Takebe (Toei); Gō Wakabayashi (Toei); Hiroaki Shibata (Toei); Kōichi Yada (Toei Agency); Akihiro Fukada (Toei Agency)
- Starring: Shunsuke Nishikawa; Gaku Matsumoto; Kaito Nakamura; Yuuka Yano; Kasumi Yamaya; Hideya Tawada
- Cinematography: Fumio Matsumura
- Edited by: Kazuko Yanagisawa
- Music by: Kousuke Yamashita
- Production company: Toei Company
- Distributed by: Toei Company
- Release date: August 8, 2015 (Japan)
- Running time: 26 minutes
- Country: Japan
- Language: Japanese

Shuriken Sentai Ninninger the Movie: The Dinosaur Lord's Splendid Ninja Scroll! (手裏剣戦隊ニンニンジャー THE MOVIE 恐竜殿さまアッパレ忍法帖！, Shuriken Sentai Ninninjā Za Mūbī Kyōryū Tono-sama Appare Ninpōchō!) is a Japanese superhero film serving as the theatrical adaptation of the 2015 Super Sentai television series Shuriken Sentai Ninninger. It was released on August 8, 2015, as a double-billing with Kamen Rider Drive: Surprise Future The film is written by television series screenwriter Kento Shimoyama.

== Story ==
The Last Ninja Yoshitaka Igasaki sends his disciples the Ninningers on a special mission over summer vacation to Shinobigakure Castle (忍隠れ城, Shinobigakure-jō). The mission is to rescue its lord, Tatsunosuke Hakkaku. While Kibaoni Army General leads his forces against the villagers, the Ninningers sneak into the castle and rescue the lord Tatsunosuke before escaping. Only after returning to the Igasaki Ninjutsu Dojo the group notice that the lord is in fact a human-sized dinosaur.

Meeting Kyuemon Izayoi, the Kibaoni Army's samurai general Juza Yumihari narrates the history of the Shinobigakure castle: long ago, the lord of the castle turned into a rampaging dinosaur after falling to anxiety, greed, and fear, bringing catastrophe to his village. Kyuemon gives Juza approval to continue the attack on the village and wishes him good luck. At the same time, Takaharu is assigned to take care of Tatsunosuke while the others return to defeat Juza's army. After rescuing the remaining villagers from Hitokarages, the Ninningers learn that Tatsunosuke was once a lord that deeply cared for his citizens but this caused him to neglect his own family and in the end he was cursed with the dinosaur transformation. The only way to break the spell is to break the lord's horn. Unfortunately, the Kibaoni Army attacks the remaining villagers again and this time they seemingly kill the other refugees and the Ninningers, leaving Kinji as the sole survivor. Takaharu is forced to leave Tatsunosuke behind and dashes to Kinji's aid, unaware the other Ninningers survived the explosion by using secret passageways beneath the village. It also seems that Juza was defeated, but he is revealed to have survived their final attack and plans to use the kidnapped villagers as hostages.

Eventually, Lord Tatsunosuke reveals himself and protects the Ninningers, lifting the dinosaur curse and creating a new Nin Shuriken, but Juza uses his Yojutsu to transform Tatsunosuke into the terrible dragon again and wreaks havoc in the village. Using Shinobimaru and Rodeomaru and Bison Buggy, Aka Ninger strikes the horn of the terrible dragon, separating Tatsunosuke from it and reveals the dragon's true name: the Otomonin Dinomaru. They soon form Shurikenzin Dino with it and defeats the enlarged Juza, returning peace to Shinobigakure.

== Production and casting ==
Toshifumi Fujimoto of owarai duo FUJIWARA provides the voice for Tatsunosuke Hakkaku. Fujimoto said his wife Yukina Kinoshita is a fan of the show, as is his daughter, joking that they fell in love with the guys in the cast and that they were surprised he would be a guest star because he is not as good looking.

== Cast ==
- Takaharu Igasaki (伊賀崎 天晴, Igasaki Takaharu): Shunsuke Nishikawa (西川 俊介, Nishikawa Shunsuke)
- Yakumo Kato (加藤 八雲, Katō Yakumo): Gaku Matsumoto (松本 岳, Matsumoto Gaku)
- Nagi Matsuo (松尾 凪, Matsuo Nagi): Kaito Nakamura (中村 嘉惟人, Nakamura Kaito)
- Fuka Igasaki (伊賀崎 風花, Igasaki Fūka): Yuuka Yano (矢野 優花, Yano Yūka)
- Kasumi Momochi (百地 霞, Momochi Kasumi): Kasumi Yamaya (山谷 花純, Yamaya Kasumi)
- Kinji Takigawa (キンジ・タキガワ): Hideya Tawada (多和田 秀弥, Tawada Hideya)
- Tatsunosuke Hakkaku (八角 辰之助, Hakkaku Tatsunosuke): Toshifumi Fujimoto (藤本 敏史, Fujimoto Toshifumi; FUJIWARA)
- Tsumuji Igasaki (伊賀崎 旋風, Igasaki Tsumuji): Toshihiro Yashiba (矢柴 俊博, Yashiba Toshihiro).
- Yoshitaka Igasaki (伊賀崎 好天, Igasaki Yoshitaka): Takashi Sasano (笹野 高史, Sasano Takashi)
- Kyuemon Izayoi (十六夜 九衛門, Izayoi Kyūemon; Voice): Megumi Han (潘 めぐみ, Han Megumi)
- Juza Yumihari (弓張 重三, Yumihari Jūza; Voice): Hiroki Tōchi (東地 宏樹, Tōchi Hiroki)
