= Shuriken Sentai Ninninger vs. ToQger the Movie: Ninja in Wonderland =

- Theatrical poster
- Kanji: 手裏剣戦隊ニンニンジャーVSトッキュウジャー THE MOVIE 忍者・イン・ワンダーランド
- Revised Hepburn: Shuriken Sentai Ninninjā tai Tokkyūjā Za Mūbī Ninja In Wandārando
- Directed by: Shōjirō Nakazawa
- Written by: Kento Shimoyama
- Produced by: Saburo Yatsude; Toei
- Starring: Shunsuke Nishikawa; Gaku Matsumoto; Kaito Nakamura; Yuuka Yano; Kasumi Yamaya; Hideya Tawada; Jun Shison; Jin Hiramaki; Riria Kojima; Ryusei Yokohama; Ai Moritaka; Shin Nagahama
- Cinematography: Fumio Matsumura
- Edited by: Kazuko Yanagisawa
- Music by: Kousuke Yamashita
- Production company: Toei
- Distributed by: Toei Co. Ltd
- Release date: January 23, 2016
- Running time: 64 minutes
- Country: Japan
- Language: Japanese

Shuriken Sentai Ninninger vs. ToQger the Movie: Ninja in Wonderland (手裏剣戦隊ニンニンジャーVSトッキュウジャー THE MOVIE 忍者・イン・ワンダーランド, Shuriken Sentai Ninninjā Tai Tokkyūjā Za Mūbī Ninja In Wandārando) is a 2016 Japanese film, featuring a crossover between the casts and characters of the Super Sentai television series Shuriken Sentai Ninninger and Ressha Sentai ToQger, including the debut appearance of the main cast of Doubutsu Sentai Zyuohger. Ryota Yamasato of the owarai duo Nankai Candies guest stars as the movie villain Dark Doctor Mavro. It was released nationally in Japan on January 23, 2016.

== Story ==
The Ninningers come across a new enemy, Dark Doctor Mavro, a remnant of the Shadow Line, who created his own, evil version of Aka Ninger serving under him by stealing the real Aka Ninger's Nintality. Because of it, Takaharu's life is now in danger. All hope seems lost until the Ninningers meet the ToQgers, who fought and defeated the Shadow Line in the past, and it's up to them to join forces in order to overcome this new crisis.

== Cast ==
- Takaharu Igasaki (伊賀崎 天晴, Igasaki Takaharu): Shunsuke Nishikawa (西川 俊介, Nishikawa Shunsuke)
- Yakumo Kato (加藤 八雲, Katō Yakumo): Gaku Matsumoto (松本 岳, Matsumoto Gaku)
- Nagi Matsuo (松尾 凪, Matsuo Nagi): Kaito Nakamura (中村 嘉惟人, Nakamura Kaito)
- Fuka Igasaki (伊賀崎 風花, Igasaki Fūka): Yuuka Yano (矢野 優花, Yano Yūka)
- Kasumi Momochi (百地 霞, Momochi Kasumi): Kasumi Yamaya (山谷 花純, Yamaya Kasumi)
- Kinji Takigawa (キンジ・タキガワ): Hideya Tawada (多和田 秀弥, Tawada Hideya)
- Right (ライト, Raito): Jun Shison (志尊 淳, Shison Jun), Homare Mabuchi (馬渕 誉, Mabuchi Homare; Child)
- Tokatti (トカッチ, Tokatchi): Jin Hiramaki (平牧 仁, Hiramaki Jin), Keishiro Nagase (永瀬 圭志朗, Nagase Keishirō; Child)
- Mio (ミオ): Riria Kojima (小島 梨里杏, Kojima Riria), Kaoruko Ishii (石井 薫子, Ishii Kaoruko; Child)
- Hikari (ヒカリ): Ryusei Yokohama (横浜 流星, Yokohama Ryūsei), Hikaru Yamazaki (山﨑 光, Yamazaki Hikaru; Child)
- Kagura (カグラ): Ai Moritaka (森高 愛, Moritaka Ai), Rara Shimizu (清水 らら, Shimizu Rara; Child)
- Akira Nijino (虹野 明, Nijino Akira): Shin Nagahama (長濱 慎, Nagahama Shin)
- Tsumuji Igasaki (伊賀崎 旋風, Igasaki Tsumuji): Toshihiro Yashiba (矢柴 俊博, Yashiba Toshihiro)
- Yoshitaka Igasaki (伊賀崎 好天, Igasaki Yoshitaka): Takashi Sasano (笹野 高史, Sasano Takashi)
- Dark Doctor Mavro (闇博士マーブロ, Yami Hakase Māburo): Ryota Yamasato (山里 亮太, Yamasato Ryōta; Nankai Candies)
- Hattori Hanzō (服部 半蔵): Shinpei Ohkita (大北 晋平, Ōkita Shinpei)
- Fūma Kotarō (風魔 小太郎): Jiro Okamoto (岡元 次郎, Okamoto Jirō)
- Sarutobi Sasuke (猿飛 佐助): Yūki Kobayashi (小林 勇輝, Kobayashi Yūki)
- Band members: Yohei Onishi (大西 洋平, Ōnishi Yōhei), Hirokazu Arai (新井 宏和, Arai Hirokazu), Shun Takabatake (高畠 俊, Takabatake Shun), Zenta Tsuchihashi (土橋 善太, Tsuchihashi Zenta)

=== Voice cast ===
- Yokai Wanyudo (妖怪ワニュウドウ, Yōkai Wanyūdō): Jūrōta Kosugi (小杉 十郎太, Kosugi Jūrōta)
- Dark Aka Ninger (闇アカニンジャー, Yami Aka Ninjā): Makoto Furukawa (古川 慎, Furukawa Makoto)
- Kyuemon Izayoi (十六夜 九衛門, Izayoi Kyūemon): Megumi Han (潘 めぐみ, Han Megumi)
- Ninninger Equipment Voice: Tsutomu Tareki (垂木 勉, Tareki Tsutomu)
- Ticket (チケット, Chiketto), ToQger Equipment Voice: Kappei Yamaguchi (山口 勝平, Yamaguchi Kappei)
- Kirigakure Nero Saizō (霧隠 ネロ 才蔵): Jun Fukuyama (福山 潤, Fukuyama Jun)
- Mochizuki Noir Chiyome (望月 ノア 千代女, Mochizuki Noa Chiyome): Aya Hisakawa (久川 綾, Hisakawa Aya)
- Ishikawa Schwarz Goemon (石川 シュバルツ 五右衛門, Ishikawa Shubarutsu Goemon): Haruhiko Jō (壤 晴彦, Jō Haruhiko)
- Zyuoh Eagle (ジュウオウイーグル, Jūō Īguru): Masaki Nakao (中尾 暢樹, Nakao Masaki)
- Zyuoh Shark (ジュウオウシャーク, Jūō Shāku): Miki Yanagi (柳 美稀, Yanagi Miki)
- Zyuoh Lion (ジュウオウライオン, Jūō Raion): Shohei Nanba (南羽 翔平, Nanba Shōhei)
- Zyuoh Elephant (ジュウオウエレファント, Jūō Erefanto): Tsurugi Watanabe (渡邉 剣, Watanabe Tsurugi)
- Zyuoh Tiger (ジュウオウタイガー, Jūō Taigā): Haruka Tateishi (立石 晴香, Tateishi Haruka)
- Zyuohger Equipment Voice: Chō (チョー)
