= Kaito Nakamura =

Kaito Nakamura may refer to:

- Kaito Nakamura (Heroes), a character in the TV series Heroes
- Kaito Nakamura (actor) (born 1998), Japanese actor and model
- Kaito Nakamura (footballer) (born 2000), Japanese football midfielder
