= Tawada =

Tawada (written: 多和田) is a Japanese surname. Notable people with the surname include:

- Hideya Tawada (多和田 秀弥, born 1993), Japanese actor and model
- Tsukasa Tawada (多和田 吏, born 1965), Japanese video game composer and sound effects designer
- Yoko Tawada (多和田 葉子, born 1960), Japanese writer
