= Kasumi Yamaya =

Japanese actress and model (born 1996)

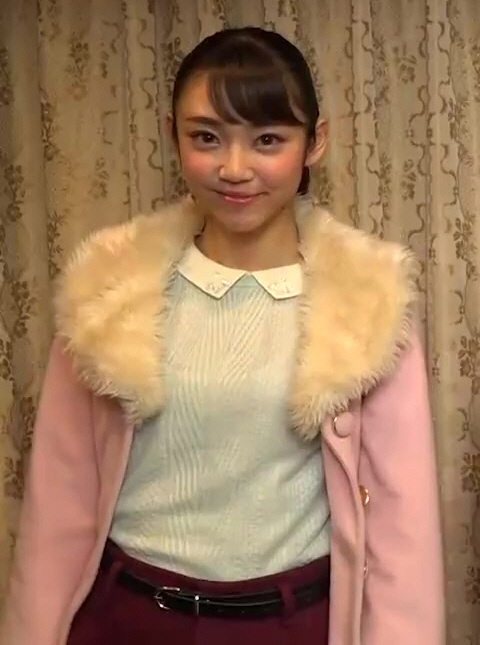
- Yamaya for Ninning Girls vs. Boys, 2016
- Born: December 26, 1996 (age 29); Sendai, Miyagi Prefecture, Japan
- Occupation: Actress
- Years active: 2008–present
- Website: avex-management.jp/artists/actor/TKASU

Kasumi Yamaya (山谷 花純, Yamaya Kasumi; born December 26, 1996) is a Japanese actress who is affiliated with Avex Vanguard. She played the role of Kasumi Momochi (Momo Ninger) in the 2015 Super Sentai TV series Shuriken Sentai Ninninger.

== Biography ==
In 2007, Yamaya, who was born in Miyagi Prefecture, passed the Actor Talent Model Audition application which was sponsored by the Avex Group. In 2008, she debuted in the drama Change. In the same year, Yamaya appeared in the drama Love Letter. In 2009, she started modeling as an exclusive model for the magazine Nico Petit. As of October 2013, Yamaya is currently represented by Avex Vanguard, Avex Group's spin-off office.

== Filmography ==
=== TV series ===
Year	Title	Role	Other notes	Ref.
2008	Change			
2011	Ohisama	Madoka Haraguchi	Asadora; episodes 1, 13, 37, and 89	
2011	Suzuki Sensei	Kankaori Masuda	Episode 7	
2011	IS	Natsu Hoshino		
2012	Hayami-san to Yobareru Hi	Kurumi Takahashi	Episodes 4 and 5	
2013	Mischievous Kiss: Love in Tokyo	Satomi Ishikawa		
2013	Amachan	Sakuraba	Asadora, episodes 54 to 156	
2013	Pin to Kona		Episode 1	
2015	Shuriken Sentai Ninninger	Kasumi Momochi / Momoninger		
2016	Married Rizky	Kasumi Yamaya		
2018	Mob Psycho 100	Tome Kurada		
2018	Legal V		Episode 1	
2020	Young GTO	Nagisa Nagase		
2020	The Way of the Househusband	Aina	Episode 8	
2022	The 13 Lords of the Shogun	Lady Wakasa	Taiga drama	
2023	Ranman	Yū Usami	Asadora	
2024	Captured New Airport	Sena Shigehara		
2024–27	Unmet: A Neurosurgeon's Diary	Hinako Mori	2 seasons	
2026	Brothers in Arms	Dashi	Taiga drama	

=== Films ===
Year	Title	Role	Other notes	Ref.
2010	Confessions	Yukari Naito		
2012	Lesson of the Evil	Ayane Mita		
2012	Kamen Rider × Kamen Rider Wizard & Fourze: Movie War Ultimatum	Rumi Komaki		
2012	Love for Beginners	Miho Ichikura		
2013	The Great Passage			
2013	Daily Lives of High School Boys	Habara		
2014	Parasyte: Part 1	Yuko		
2014	Space Sheriff Sharivan: Next Generation	Horror Girl		
2014	Space Sheriff Shaider: Next Generation	Hilda Gordon / Horror Girl		
2015	Ressha Sentai ToQger vs. Kyoryuger: The Movie	Kasumi Momochi / Momoninger (Voice)	Cameo	
2015	Super Hero Taisen GP: Kamen Rider 3	Kasumi Momochi / Momoninger		
2015	Shuriken Sentai Ninninger the Movie: The Dinosaur Lord's Splendid Ninja Scroll!	Kasumi Momochi / Momoninger		
2016	Shuriken Sentai Ninninger vs. ToQger the Movie: Ninja in Wonderland	Kasumi Momochi /Momoninger		
2016	Come Back! Shuriken Sentai Ninninger: Ninnin Girls vs. Boys FINAL WARS	Kasumi Momochi / Momoninger		
2017	Doubutsu Sentai Zyuohger vs. Ninninger the Movie: Super Sentai's Message from the Future	Kasumi Momochi / Momoninger		
2018	Code Blue			
2020	Sakura			
2021	You're Not Normal, Either			
2022	Bldg. N			
2022	The Three Sisters of Tenmasou Inn	Yuna Serizawa		
2022	Amnesiac Love	Kana Oikawa		
2025	Rewrite	Atsuko Hasegawa		
2025	Bad Boys	Erika		
2025	S-Friends 4	Mei Fubuki		
2026	#Spread	Aki Asaoka		
2026	Home Sweet Home			
