= Shunsuke Nishikawa =

Japanese actor (born 1994)

- 西川 俊介
- Born: April 4, 1994 (age 31); Gunma Prefecture, Japan
- Occupation: Actor
- Years active: 2015–present
- Height: 175 cm (5 ft 9 in)

Shunsuke Nishikawa (西川 俊介, Nishikawa Shunsuke; born April 4, 1994, in Gunma Prefecture) is a Japanese actor who was affiliated with K Dash, until he moved to RubyParade on April 4. 2017. He played the role of Takaharu Igasaki (Akaninger), the main character of the 2015 Super Sentai TV series Shuriken Sentai Ninninger.

== Biography ==
Nishikawa plays a number of sports, including baseball. He participated in the 26th Junon Super Boy Contest Quasi Grand Prix. Nishikawa first television role was in the 39th Super Sentai series, Shuriken Sentai Ninninger.

== Filmography ==
=== TV series ===
Year	Title	Role	Network	Other notes
2015	Shuriken Sentai Ninninger	Takaharu Igasaki/Aka Ninger	TV Asahi	Main role
2016	AKB Love Night Koi Kōjō	Tomoki Hirose	TV Asahi	
2019	Super Sentai Strongest Battle	Takaharu Igasaki/Aka Ninger	TV Asahi	
2020	The Reason Why He Fell In Love With Me	Ryo Takase	Tokyo MX	

=== Films ===
Year	Title	Role	Other notes
2015	Ressha Sentai ToQger vs. Kyoryuger: The Movie	Takaharu Igasaki/Aka Ninger (voice)	Cameo
2015	Super Hero Taisen GP: Kamen Rider 3	Takaharu Igasaki/Aka Ninger	
2015	Shuriken Sentai Ninninger the Movie: The Dinosaur Lord's Splendid Ninja Scroll!	Takaharu Igasaki/Aka Ninger	
2015	Shuriken Sentai Ninninger: AkaNinger vs. StarNinger Hundred Nin Battle!	Takaharu Igasaki/Aka Ninger	
2016	Shuriken Sentai Ninninger vs. ToQger the Movie: Ninja in Wonderland	Takaharu Igasaki/Aka Ninger	
2016	Come Back! Shuriken Sentai Ninninger: Ninnin Girls vs. Boys FINAL WARS''	Takaharu Igasaki/Aka Ninger	
2017	Doubutsu Sentai Zyuohger vs. Ninninger the Movie: Super Sentai's Message from the Future	Takaharu Igasaki/Aka Ninger	
2017	High&Low The Movie 2 / End of Sky	Lassie	
2017	High&Low The Movie 3 / Final Mission	Lassie	
2018	DTC: Yukemuri Junjo Hen from High & Low	Lassie	
2019	Black Crow 1	Kazuki	
2019	Love in Parallel	Paprika	
2025	CYBORG ISSHINTASUKE!	Shinjiro Iwayama	
