= Yuuka Yano =

Japanese actress (born 1998)

- 矢野 優花
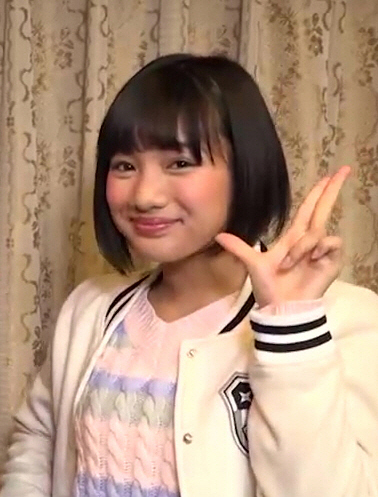
- Born: January 6, 1998 (age 28); Miyazaki Prefecture, Japan
- Occupation: Actress
- Years active: 2015–present
- Agent: Stardust Promotion
- Height: 160 cm (5 ft 3 in)
- Website: Official profile

Yuuka Yano (矢野 優花, Yano Yūka; born January 6, 1998) is a Japanese actress. She played the role of Fuka Igasaki (Shiro Ninger) in the 2015 Super Sentai TV series Shuriken Sentai Ninninger.

== Biography ==
In 2014, Yano won the 1st Uniforms Women & Men's Contest modelling competition.

In 2015, Yano acted in her first television role as Fuka Igasaki/Shironinger in the 39th Super Sentai series, Shuriken Sentai Ninninger.

== Filmography ==
=== TV series ===
Year	Title	Role	Network	Notes
2015–2016	Shuriken Sentai Ninninger	Fuka Igasaki/Shironinger	TV Asahi	
2015	Shuriken Sentai Ninninger Vs. Kamen Rider Drive Spring Vacation One-Hour Special	Fuka Igasaki/Shironinger	TV Asahi	Television special
2017	Kasōken no Onna	Aihara Yuma	TV Asahi	Season 16, episode 16
2017	Emergency Interrogation Room	Midori Kubodera	TV Asahi	2 episodes
2017	Keishichō Kidō Sōsa-tai 216	Mirei Toda	TBS	Guest role

=== Films ===
Year	Title	Role	Notes	Ref.
2015	Ressha Sentai ToQger vs. Kyoryuger: The Movie	Shironinger (voice)	Cameo	
2015	Super Hero Taisen GP: Kamen Rider 3	Fuka Igasaki/Shironinger		
2015	Shuriken Sentai Ninninger the Movie: The Dinosaur Lord's Splendid Ninja Scroll!	Fuka Igasaki/Shironinger		
2016	Shuriken Sentai Ninninger vs. ToQger the Movie: Ninja in Wonderland	Fuka Igasaki/Shironinger		
2016	Come Back! Shuriken Sentai Ninninger: Ninnin Girls vs. Boys FINAL WARS	Fuka Igasaki/Shironinger		
2017	Doubutsu Sentai Zyuohger vs. Ninninger the Movie: Super Sentai's Message from the Future	Fuka Igasaki/Shironinger		
2017	Sagrada Reset	Mirai Minami		
2019	Prison 13			
2025	Silent Night			
