= Gaku Matsumoto =

Japanese actor

- 松本 岳
- Born: April 8, 1993 (age 33); Yatsuo, Toyama, Toyama Prefecture, Japan
- Education: Senshu University
- Occupation: Actor
- Years active: 2013–present
- Height: 172 cm (5 ft 8 in)

Gaku Matsumoto (松本 岳, Matsumoto Gaku; born April 8, 1993 in Yatsuo, Toyama, Toyama Prefecture) is a Japanese actor who is affiliated with Izawa Office. He played the role of Yakumo Kato (Aoninger) in the 2015 Super Sentai TV series Shuriken Sentai Ninninger.

== Biography ==
Matsumoto's family ran an Italian restaurant. His hobbies were watching films and playing soccer. At Toyama Daichikotōgakko high school, he was a member of the soccer team that took part in the All Japan High School Soccer Tournament. He was a Senshu University Faculty of Economics student, but left in April 2015. In June 2013, Matsumoto became affiliated to Izawa Office. On February 22, 2015, he appeared in the 39th Super Sentai series, Shuriken Sentai Ninninger as Yakumo Kato/Aoninger. He was the first Heisei-born Sentai ranger since Kaizoku Sentai Gokaiger four years previously.

== Filmography ==
=== TV series ===
Year	Title	Role	Network	Other notes	Ref
2015	Shuriken Sentai Ninninger	Yakumo Kato/Aoninger	TV Asahi	Main role	
2021	Shimura Ken to Drif no Daibakushō Monogatari	Kōji Nakamoto	Fuji TV	Television film	

=== Films ===
Year	Title	Role	Other notes
2015	Ressha Sentai ToQger vs. Kyoryuger: The Movie	Aoninger	Voice role, cameo
2015	Super Hero Taisen GP: Kamen Rider 3	Yakumo Kato/Aoninger (voice)	Cameo
2015	Shuriken Sentai Ninninger the Movie: The Dinosaur Lord's Splendid Ninja Scroll!	Yakumo Kato/Aoninger (voice)	Main role
2016	Shuriken Sentai Ninninger vs. ToQger the Movie: Ninja in Wonderland	Yakumo Kato/Aoninger (voice)	Main role
2016	Come Back! Shuriken Sentai Ninninger: Ninnin Girls vs. Boys FINAL WARS	Yakumo Kato/Aoninger (voice)	Main role
2017	Doubutsu Sentai Zyuohger vs. Ninninger the Movie: Super Sentai's Message from the Future	Yakumo Kato/Aoninger (voice)	Main role
2017	Kamen Rider × Super Sentai: Ultra Super Hero Taisen	Yakumo Kato/Aoninger (voice)	Main role
