= Megumi Han =

Japanese actress (born 1989)

- 潘 めぐみ
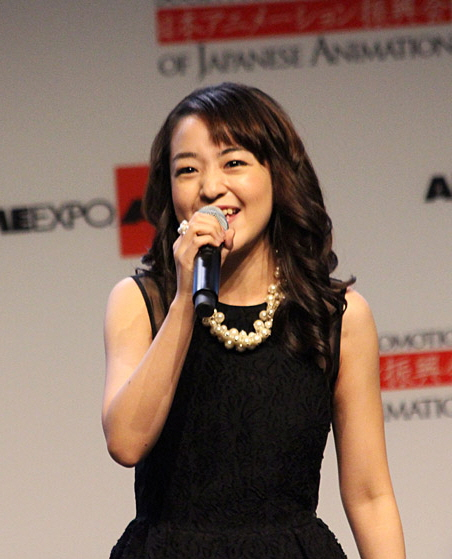
- Han at Anime Expo 2013
- Born: Megumi Han (潘 芽具実); June 3, 1989 (age 37); Tokyo, Japan
- Education: Nihon University
- Occupations: Actress; voice actress
- Years active: 2008–present
- Agent: Atomic Monkey
- Mother: Keiko Han

Megumi Han (潘 めぐみ, Han Megumi; born June 3, 1989) is a Japanese actress and voice actress employed by Atomic Monkey. She is the daughter of the voice actress Keiko Han.

== Career ==
In 2008, after a general public call for the film Sakura no Sono, she made her debut as Satoshi Wada while studying at the Department of Drama at Nihon University College of Art.

In 2011, she made her debut as a voice actress for the anime series Digimon Xros Wars: The Young Hunters Who Leapt Through Time. Han voiced the main character Gon Freecss in Hunter × Hunter. In the audition, she was unanimously chosen from over 100 participants. She voiced Hime Shirayuki / Cure Princess in the anime series HappinessCharge Pretty Cure!. Among her co-stars is Miki Hase, a classmate from her university.

She won the Best Actress in a Supporting Role at the 11th Seiyu Awards.

== Filmography ==
=== Anime series ===
Year	Title	Role
2011	Digimon Xros Wars: The Young Hunters Who Leapt Through Time	Airu Suzaki
2011	Hunter × Hunter	Gon Freecss
2012	Chō Soku Henkei Gyrozetter	Sei Nanatsu
2012	Metal Fight Beyblade Zero-G	Takanosuke Shishiya
2012	Chōyaku Hyakunin isshu: Uta Koi	Young Ariwara no Narihira
2012	Yu-Gi-Oh! Zexal II	Rio Kamishiro
2013	Chihayafuru 2	Sumire Hanano
2013	Jewelpet Happiness	Chiari Tsukikage
2013	Little Busters! Refrain	Young Kengo
2013	Yuyushiki	Kei Okano
2013	Hakkenden	Noro
2013	Fantasista Doll	Miina Rurukawa
2013	Naruto: Shippuden	Young Obito Uchiha, Young Kurenai Yuhi
2013	LINE TOWN	Leonard
2013	Kin-iro Mosaic	Kota Inokuma
2013	Mushibugyō	Kuroageha
2013	Yowamushi Pedal	Aya Tachibana
2014	Hunter × Hunter	Cluck, Yasuha
2014	HappinessCharge Pretty Cure!	Hime Shirayuki/Cure Princess
2014	Black Bullet	Kayo Senju
2014	Blade & Soul	Morii
2014	Captain Earth	Lin
2014	Terror in Resonance	Five
2014	Mobile Suit Gundam-san	Lalah-san
2014	Barakamon	Akihiko Arai
2014	The Seven Deadly Sins	Friesia
2014	Yowamushi Pedal Grande Road	Aya Tachibana
2015	Fafner in the Azure: Exodus	Aishwarya Fein
2015	Show By Rock!!	Daru Dayu
2015	My Love Story!!	Rinko Yamato
2015	Naruto Shippuden	Saya, Yome, Princess Chiyo
2015	Baby Steps Season 2	Marcia O'Brien
2015	Ushio and Tora	Kirio
2015	Chivalry of a Failed Knight	Utakata Misogi
2015	Kamisama Minarai: Himitsu no Cocotama	Luckytama
2015	Hello!! Kin-iro Mosaic	Kota Inokuma
2016	Bubuki Buranki	Reoko Banryū
2016	Twin Star Exorcists	Benio Adashino
2016	Mobile Suit Gundam: Iron-Blooded Orphans	young Gaelio Bauduin
2016	D.Gray-man Hallow	Young Alma Karma
2016	Show By Rock!! Short!!	Daru Dayu
2016	Show byRock!!#	Daru Dayu
2017	Little Witch Academia	Atsuko "Akko" Kagari
2017	Snack World	Chup
2017	Yowamushi Pedal: New Generation	Aya Tachibana
2017	Gamers!	Keita Amano
2017	Altair: A Record of Battles	Margit
2018	Killing Bites	Yōko Mitsukado
2018	Devilman Crybaby	Miki Makimura
2018	Black Clover	Kahono
2018	Steins;Gate 0	Kagari Shiina
2018	Mr. Tonegawa: Middle Management Blues	Zawa Voice (008)
2018	My Hero Academia	Tatami Nakagame
2018	Sword Art Online: Alicization	Sortiliena Serlut
2018	Captain Tsubasa	Takeshi Sawada
2019	Kakegurui XX	Terano Totobami
2019	Ultraman	Seiji Hokuto
2019	Fruits Basket	Momiji Sōma
2019	Crayon Shin-chan	Yuzuman
2019	The Rising of the Shield Hero	Glass
2019	Beyblade Burst GT	Drum Koryu
2019	One Piece	Kurozumi Tama
2019	Inazuma Eleven: Orion no Kokuin	Yurika Beor
2019	Chihayafuru 3	Sumire Hanano
2020	Ghost in the Shell: SAC 2045	Purin Ezaki
2020	BNA: Brand New Animal	Jackie
2020	Beyblade Burst Superking	Drum Koryu
2020	Digimon Adventure	Takeru Takaishi
2021	Show by Rock!! Stars!!	Daru Dayu
2021	Back Arrow	Ren Sin
2021	World Trigger Season 2	Yōko Katori
2021	My Next Life as a Villainess: All Routes Lead to Doom! X	Frey Randall
2021	Megaton Musashi	Momoka Saotome
2021	Komi Can't Communicate	Nokoko Inaka, Chika Netsuno
2021	Platinum End	Susumu Yuito
2021	Yo-kai Watch Jam - Yo-kai Academy Y: Close Encounters of the N Kind	Earth Walker, Lime Ashiya/Terranog/Ashura Gilfer
2022	Ninjala	Emma
2022	Black Rock Shooter: Dawn Fall	Strength
2022	Detective Conan: Zero's Tea Time	Haro
2022	RWBY: Ice Queendom	Penny Polendina
2022	PuniRunes	Airune
2022	Boruto: Naruto Next Generations	Seiren Funato
2022	The Little Lies We All Tell	Tsubasa
2022	To Your Eternity 2nd Season	Torta
2023	Trigun Stampede	Lolo
2023	Oshi no Ko	Kana Arima
2023	Sacrificial Princess and the King of Beasts	Amit
2023	Skip and Loafer	Makoto Kurume
2023	The Dangers in My Heart	Moeko Sekine
2023	The Devil Is a Part-Timer!!	Erone
2023	Ron Kamonohashi's Forbidden Deductions	Fin Fennec
2023	The Apothecary Diaries	Meimei
2023	Shangri-La Frontier	Faeria
2024	Doctor Elise	Yulian De Childe
2024	The Banished Former Hero Lives as He Pleases	Beatrice
2024	Tonari no Yōkai-san	Rein Nakagawa
2024	Kaiju No. 8	Kafka Hibino (young)
2024	My Deer Friend Nokotan	Noko Shikanoko/Nokotan
2024	Kagaku×Bōken Survival	Pipi
2025	Magic Maker: How to Make Magic in Another World	Shion
2025	Dr. Stone: Science Future	Chelsea
2025	Black Butler: Emerald Witch Arc	Sascha
2025	Digimon Beatbreak	Gekkomon
2025	Si-Vis: The Sound of Heroes	Krios
2026	Nippon Sangoku	Narrator
2026	The Prince of Tennis II: U-17 World Cup Finals Members Decisive Match	Sedah
2026	Vertex Force	Lala Zudenstein
2026	Magical Girl Raising Project: Restart	Keek

=== Films ===
Year	Title	Role
2013	Hunter × Hunter: Phantom Rouge	Gon Freecss
2013	A Certain Magical Index: The Movie – The Miracle of Endymion	Mallybeth Blackball
2013	The Garden of Words	Satō
2013	Little Witch Academia	Akko Kagari
2013	Hunter × Hunter: The Last Mission	Gon Freecss
2013	Neppu Kairiku Bushi Road	Ame
2014	Pretty Cure All Stars New Stage 3: Eternal Friends	Hime Shirayuki/Cure Princess
2014	HappinessCharge PreCure! the Movie: The Ballerina of the Land of Dolls	Hime Shirayuki/Cure Princess
2015	Pretty Cure All Stars: Spring Carnival	Hime Shirayuki/Cure Princess
2015	Ghost in the Shell: The New Movie	Chris
2015	Little Witch Academia: The Enchanted Parade	Akko Kagari
2016	Pretty Cure All Stars: Singing with Everyone Miraculous Magic	Hime Shirayuki/Cure Princess
2016	A Silent Voice	Miki Kawai
2016	In This Corner of the World	Sumi Urano
2018	Crayon Shin-chan: Burst Serving! Kung Fu Boys ~Ramen Rebellion~	Ran Tama
2018	Penguin Highway	Hamamoto
2018	Hugtto! PreCure Futari wa Pretty Cure: All Stars Memories	Hime Shirayuki/Cure Princess
2019	Seven Days War	Kaori Yamasaki
2020	Love Me, Love Me Not	Akari Yamamoto
2020	Survival	Pipi
2021	Words Bubble Up Like Soda Pop	Bieber
2021	Eureka - Eureka Seven: Hi-Evolution	Chime
2022	Mobile Suit Gundam: Cucuruz Doan's Island	Sayla Mass
2023	Hokkyoku Hyakkaten no Concierge-san	Mori
2024	Yamato yo Towa ni: Rebel 3199	Sasha
2025	Eiga Odekake Kozame Tokai no Otomodachi	Ankō-chan

=== Original net animations ===
Year	Title	Role
2018	Devilman Crybaby	Miki Makimura
2021	Resident Evil: Infinite Darkness	Shen May
2021	Star Wars: Visions - The Village Bride	Haru
2021	Baki Hanma	Rumina Ayukawa
2022	Vampire in the Garden	Momo
2025	Koisuru One Piece	Tsuchi
2026	Love Through a Prism	Dorothy Brown
2026	Dandelion	Misaki Kurogane

=== Original video animations ===
Year	Title	Role
2015	Mobile Suit Gundam: The Origin	Artesia Som Deikun
2015	Tokyo Ghoul: Pinto	Hori Chie
2016	Brotherhood: Final Fantasy XV	Iris Amicitia
2022	Strike the Blood Final	Raadorii Ren

=== Video games ===
Year	Title	Role
2013	Digimon Adventure	Takeru Takaishi
2013	Phoenix Wright: Ace Attorney - Dual Destinies	Kizuki Kokone/Athena Cykes
2013	Show By Rock!!	Naru
2014	Danganronpa Another Episode: Ultra Despair Girls	Masaru Daimon
2014	Granblue Fantasy	Alec
2014	Granblue Fantasy	Jeanne D'Arc
2014	Guilty Gear Xrd -SIGN-	Ramlethal Valentine
2014	HappinessCharge PreCure! Kawarun Collection	Hime Shirayuki/Cure Princess
2014	J-Stars Victory VS	Gon Freecsss
2014	Super Smash Bros. for Nintendo 3DS & Wii U	Phosphora
2014	Yu-Gi-Oh! ZEXAL World Duel Carnival	Rio Kamishiro
2015	Digimon Story: Cyber Sleuth	Nokia Shiramine
2015	Disgaea 5	Majorita
2015	Dragon Ball Xenoverse	Time Patroller (Female 7)
2015	Guilty Gear Xrd -REVELATOR-	Ramlethal Valentine
2015	Steins;Gate 0	Kagari Shiina
2015	Yu-Gi-Oh! ARC-V: Tag Force Special	Rio Kamishiro
2016	Dragon Quest Heroes II	Erinn
2016	Ensemble Girls!!	Ruka Tsukinaga
2016	Etrian Odyssey V: Beyond the Myth	Voice #22
2016	Final Fantasy XV	Iris Amicitia
2016	Naruto Shippuden: Ultimate Ninja Storm 4	Obito Uchiha (Young)
2017	Digimon Story: Cyber Sleuth - Hacker's Memory	Nokia Shiramine
2017	Little Witch Academia: Chamber of Time	Atsuko "Akko" Kagari
2017	Shin Megami Tensei: Strange Journey Redux	Alex
2018	Detective Pikachu	Milo Green
2018	Phantasy Star Online 2	Harriet
2018	Dragalia Lost	Jeanne D'Arc
2018	Princess Connect! Re:Dive	Muimi/Muimi Sonoue
2018	Shōjo Kageki Revue Starlight -Re LIVE-	Aruru Otsuki
2019	Ace Combat 7	Rosa Cosette d'Elise
2019	Another Eden	Kikyo
2019	Fate/Grand Order	Kingprotea
2019	Jump Force	Gon Freecss
2019	Phantasy Star Online 2	Shiva
2019; 2021	The King of Fighters All Star	Pretty Yashiro, Ramlethal Valentine
2020	Ninjala	Emma
2021	Guilty Gear -STRIVE-	Ramlethal Valentine
2021	Lost Judgment	Kotoko Itokura
2022	Xenoblade Chronicles 3	Eunie
2023	Final Fantasy XVI	Jill Warrick
2023	Armored Core VI: Fires of Rubicon	ALLMIND
2024	Azur Lane	Bayard
2024	Honkai: Star Rail	Rappa
2025	Rusty Rabbit	Eliza

=== Tokusatsu ===
- Shuriken Sentai Ninninger (2015-2016) (Kyuemon Izayoi (voice))
- Shuriken Sentai Ninninger Vs. Kamen Rider Drive Spring Vacation Combining Special (2015) (Kyuemon Izayoi (voice))
- Shuriken Sentai Ninninger the Movie: The Dinosaur Lord's Splendid Ninja Scroll! (2015) (Kyuemon Izayoi (voice))
- Shuriken Sentai Ninninger vs. ToQger the Movie: Ninja in Wonderland (2016) (Kyuemon Izayoi (voice))
- Come Back! Shuriken Sentai Ninninger: Ninnin Girls vs. Boys FINAL WARS (2016) (Luna Kokonoe/MidoNinger/Kyuemon Izayoi (voice))
- Ultraman Geed (2017) (Alien Pegassa Pega)
- Ultraman New Generation Chronicle (2019) (Alien Pegassa Pega)
- Ultraman Z (2020) (Alien Pegassa Pega)
- Ultra Galaxy Fight: The Absolute Conspiracy (2020) (sora/Ultraman Justice)
- Ultraman Chronicle D (2022) (Alien Pegassa Pega)

=== Live action film ===
- Anime Supremacy! (2022), Takaya (voice)

=== Dubbing roles ===
==== Live-action ====
- Chloë Grace Moretz
  - Let Me In (Abby)
  - Carrie (Carrie White)
  - The Equalizer (Alina / Teri)
  - Dark Places (young Diondra Wertzner)
- The Adventurer: The Curse of the Midas Box (Sacha (Mella Carron))
- Anyone but You (Beatrice Messina (Sydney Sweeney))
- The Apartment (2025 BS10 Star Channel edition) (Fran Kubelik (Shirley MacLaine))
- Before Mars (Hana Seung / Joon Seung (Nekhebet Juch / Uatchet Juch))
- Captain America: Brave New World (Ruth Bat-Seraph (Shira Haas))
- Crash Landing on You (Seo Dan (Seo Ji-hye))
- Death on the Nile (Louise Bourget (Rose Leslie))
- Doom Patrol (Jane (Diane Guerrero))
- Fall (Hunter Shiloh (Virginia Gardner))
- Famous in Love (Cassandra "Cassie" Perkins (Georgie Flores))
- Fast X (Isabel Neves (Daniela Melchior))
- The First Lady (Susan Ford (Dakota Fanning))
- The Flash (Iris West (Kiersey Clemons))
- Harry's Law (Jessica Donner (Halle Charlton))
- Independence Day: Resurgence (Sam (Joey King))
- Knights of the Zodiac (Sienna / Athena (Madison Iseman))
- Last Night in Soho (Eloise "Ellie" Turner (Thomasin McKenzie))
- The Last of Us (Ellie (Bella Ramsey))
- Legion (Sydney "Syd" Barrett (Rachel Keller))
- Lights Out (Rebecca (Teresa Palmer))
- Line of Duty (Ava Brooks (Courtney Eaton))
- Mad Max: Fury Road (Cheedo the Fragile (Courtney Eaton))
- Madame Web (Julia Cornwall (Sydney Sweeney))
- Martin (2018 Blu-ray edition) (Christina (Christine Forrest))
- Maze Runner: The Death Cure (Brenda (Rosa Salazar))
- Morgan (Morgan (Anya Taylor-Joy))
- The Neon Demon (Jesse (Elle Fanning))
- The Poseidon Adventure (2016 BS-TBS edition) (Susan Shelby (Pamela Sue Martin))
- The Secret Circle (Cassie Blake (Britt Robertson))
- The Space Between Us (Tulsa (Britt Robertson))
- Teenage Mutant Ninja Turtles (Taylor (Abby Elliott))
- Warm Bodies (Julie Grigio (Teresa Palmer))
- Willow (Dove (Ellie Bamber))
- Winter's Tale (Willa Penn (Eva Marie Saint))
- Young Sheldon (Sheldon Cooper (Iain Armitage))
- Zack Snyder's Justice League (Iris West (Kiersey Clemons))

==== Animation ====
- 44 Cats (Lampo)
- DC Super Hero Girls (Supergirl)
- Epic (Dandelion Girl)
- Lego Monkie Kid (Red Son)
- Mr. Peabody & Sherman (Carl)
- My Little Pony: Equestria Girls (Cheerilee)
- My Little Pony: Equestria Girls – Rainbow Rocks (Sonata Dusk)
- My Little Pony: Friendship Is Magic (Cheerilee)
- Paw Patrol (Kento/Ryder)
- Paw Patrol: The Movie (Kento/Ryder)
- RWBY (Penny Polendina, Velvet Scarlatina)
- Stillwater (Michael)
- Super Why! (Whyatt Beanstalk/Super Why)
- The Boss Baby: Back in Business (Timothy Leslie "Timmy" Templeton)
- The Croods: A New Age (Dawn Betterman)
- The Powerpuff Girls (Bliss)
- Thunderbirds Are Go (Eiden Williams)

==== Video games ====
- DC Super Hero Girls: Teen Power (2021), (Supergirl / Kara Danvers (Nicole Sullivan))
- The Last of Us (2013), (Ellie (Ashley Johnson))
- The Last of Us Part II (2020), (Ellie (Ashley Johnson))
- Rusty Rabbit (2025), (Eliza)

== Awards ==
Year	Award	Category	Result
2017	11th Seiyu Awards	Best Supporting Actress	Won
2019	3rd Crunchyroll Anime Awards	Best VA Performance (Japanese)	Nominated
