= Sugar Dog Life =

Japanese manga series

- Cover of the Japanese version, released on February 14, 2020

シュガードッグライフ (Shugā Doggu Raifu)
- Genre: Cooking, romance, boys' love
- Manga
- Written by: Yoriko
- Published by: Ichijinsha
- English publisher: NA: Manga Planet
- Imprint: Gateau Comics
- Magazine: Gateau
- Original run: January 30, 2019 – December 28, 2019
- Volumes: 1
- Television drama
- Directed by: Ryūichi Honda; Takahiro Ōuchi; Kozue Sasaki
- Written by: Motoko Takahashi; Ayumi Shimo; Shiori Ueno; Fumino Ikuzaki
- Music by: Erina Koyama
- Original network: TV Asahi; ABC
- Original run: August 3, 2024 – September 29, 2024
- Episodes: 9

Sugar Dog Life (Japanese: シュガードッグライフ, Hepburn: Shugā Doggu Raifu) is a Japanese manga series by Yoriko. It was serialized in the monthly boys' love manga magazine Gateau from January 30, 2019, to December 28, 2019. A live-action television drama adaptation was broadcast on TV Asahi from August 3, 2024, to September 29, 2024.

== Plot ==
While returning home from a drinking party late at night, university student Isumi Sakuraba is mistaken for a minor due to his short, youthful appearance by police officer Kyōsuke Amasawa and is almost taken into custody. When Amasawa shows up at Isumi's part-time job at the convenience store, Isumi answers his recommendations on food. Since then, Amasawa often shows up asking for more recommendations. Despite Isumi getting annoyed at Amasawa talking to him, he becomes concerned about his diet. One day, out of the blue, Isumi suggests going to Amasawa's home to cook for him. As the two grow closer to each other, Isumi finds himself falling in love with Amasawa, but Amasawa remains oblivious to his feelings. Eventually, Amasawa realizes he reciprocates Isumi's feelings, and the two become a couple.

== Characters ==
Isumi Sakuraba (桜庭 唯純, Sakuraba Isumi)
Portrayed by: Kōki Tanaka
Isumi is a college student, but he is often mistaken for a minor due to his short stature and his appearance. He works part-time at a convenience store. He is part of his university's cooking club and has a tsundere personality. He is described as a slightly "cunning" and "mischievous" boy with a "pure-hearted" personality.
Kyōsuke Amasawa (天沢 恭丞, Amasawa Kyōsuke)
Portrayed by: Hideya Tawada
Amasawa is a police officer with an easy-going, naturally flirtatious personality. He works at the police box close to the convenience store where Isumi works.
Yōhei Nakagawa (中川 陽平, Nakagawa Yōhei)
Portrayed by: Souta Uemura
Yōhei is one of Isumi's friends at university who is also in the same cooking club. Yoriko stated that Yōhei and Shōji were important in the story so that they could show a different side to Isumi compared to when he is with Amasawa.
Rihito Shōji (東海林 璃仁, Shōji Rihito)
Portrayed by: Raiku
Shōji is one of Isumi's friends at university who is also in the same cooking club.

== Media ==
=== Manga ===
Sugar Dog Life is written and illustrated by Yoriko. It is serialized in the monthly boys' love manga magazine Gateau from the February 2019 issue released on January 30, 2019, to the January 2020 issue released on December 28, 2019. The chapters were later released in one bound volume by Ichijinsha under the Gateau Comics imprint. In July 2023, during Anime Expo, Manga Planet announced that they would distribute the manga in English on their website.

In 2020, Yoriko stated through an interview with Chil Chil that she had wanted to draw an age gap romance, and that she made one of the characters a police officer because she had also wanted to draw a height difference. While drawing cacti in Sugar Dog Life, she ended up buying and raising one herself.

No.	Original release date	Original ISBN	English release date	English ISBN
1	February 14, 2020	978-4758020909	July 1, 2023	—

=== Television drama ===
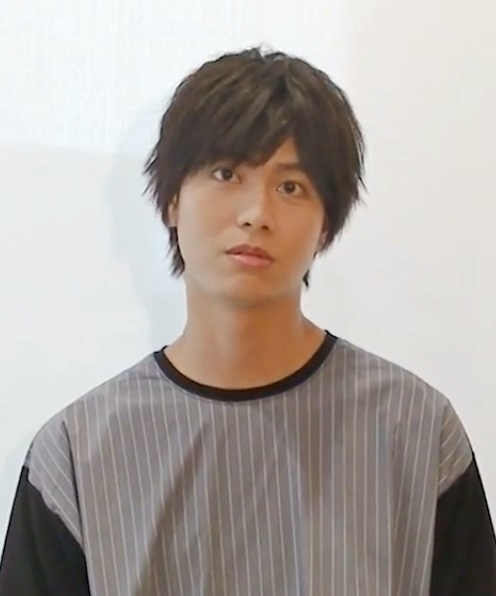
Hideya Tawada (pictured in 2018) portrayed Amasawa in the television drama.

A live-action television drama adaptation of Sugar Dog Life was announced on June 14, 2024. It was broadcast on TV Asahi on August 3, 2024, and ABC on August 4, 2024, for their late-night Sunday programming block Drama L.

The series stars Super Dragon member Kōki Tanaka as Isumi and Hideya Tawada as Amasawa. The supporting cast includes Souta Uemura as Yōhei and Raiku as Shōji. Additional cast members include Toshiki Kashu as Keiichirō Sakuraba, Noa Kita as Nanao Toyoshima, and Liyuu as Shiorin, original characters created for the drama.

The television drama adaptation is directed by Ryūichi Honda, Takahiro Ōuchi, and Kozue Sasaki. Motoko Takahashi, Ayumi Shimo, Shiori Ueno, and Fumino Ikuzaki are in charge of the script. The soundtrack is composed by Erina Koyama. The opening theme song is "Sweets" by Super Dragon, and the ending theme is "Futari Yōbi" by YaYuYo.

==== Episodes ====
No.	Title	Directed by	Written by	Original release date
1	"The Food I Made Just For You"; Transliteration: "Kimi no Tame ni Tsukuru Gohan" (Japanese: 君のために作るごはん)	Ryūichi Honda	Motoko Takahashi	August 3, 2024
2	"Today, We'll Have a Meal for Two"; Transliteration: "Kyō wa Futari Meshi" (Japanese: 今日は二人メシ)	Ryūichi Honda	Motoko Takahashi	August 12, 2024
3	"A Rewarding Meal For the Two Who Worked Hard"; Transliteration: "Ganbatta Futari no Gohōbi Gohan" (Japanese: 頑張った二人のごほうびごはん)	Ryūichi Honda	Shiori Ueno	August 19, 2024
4	"I Want to Keep Your Deliciousness to Myself"; Transliteration: "Kimi no Oishii o Hitorijime" (Japanese: 君のおいしいをひとりじめ)	Kozue Sasaki	Shiori Ueno	August 26, 2024
5	"A Lunch Box That Produces Love"; Transliteration: "Koi ga Minoru Obentǒ" (Japanese: 恋が実るお弁当)	Kozue Sasaki	Fumino Ikuzaki	September 1, 2024
6	"Since My Breakfast is Good"; Transliteration: "Ore no Asa Meshi, Umai Kara" (Japanese: 俺の朝メシ、うまいから)	Kozue Sasaki	Fumino Ikuzaki	September 8, 2024
7	"A Sweet, Delicious Surprise"; Transliteration: "Amakute Oishii Sapuraizu" (Japanese: 甘くておいしいサプライズ)	Takahiro Ōuchi	Ayumi Shimo	September 15, 2024
8	"Your Rice Porridge is a Miracle Drug"; Transliteration: "Kimi no Okayu wa Tokkōyaku" (Japanese: 君のおかゆは特効薬)	Takahiro Ōuchi	Ayumi Shimo	September 22, 2024
9	"The Meal I'll Eat with You From Now On"; Transliteration: "Kore Kara mo Kimi to Taberu Gohan" (Japanese: これからも君と食べるごはん)	Takahiro Ōuchi	Motoko Takahashi	September 29, 2024
