= Ressha Sentai ToQger vs. Kyoryuger: The Movie =

- Theatrical release poster

Japanese name
- Kanji: 烈車戦隊トッキュウジャーVSキョウリュウジャー THE MOVIE
Transcriptions
- Revised Hepburn: Ressha Sentai Tokkyūjā Tai Kyōryūjā Za Mūbī
- Directed by: Katsuya Watanabe
- Written by: Yasuko Kobayashi
- Produced by: Motoi Sasaki (TV Asahi); Takaaki Utsunomiya; Kei Ishikawa (Toei); Koichi Yada; Akihiro Fukada (Toei Agency)
- Starring: Jun Shison; Jin Hiramaki; Riria Kojima; Ryusei Yokohama; Ai Moritaka; Shin Nagahama; Ryo Ryusei; Syuusuke Saito; Yamato Kinjo; Akihisa Shiono; Ayuri Konno; Atsushi Maruyama
- Cinematography: Fumio Matsumura
- Edited by: Kazuko Yanagisawa
- Music by: Kei Haneoka; Toshihiko Sahashi
- Production company: Toei Company
- Distributed by: Toei Company
- Release date: January 17, 2015
- Running time: 64 minutes
- Country: Japan
- Language: Japanese
- Box office: ¥86.5 million

Ressha Sentai ToQger vs. Kyoryuger: The Movie (烈車戦隊トッキュウジャーVSキョウリュウジャー THE MOVIE, Ressha Sentai Tokkyūjā Tai Kyōryūjā Za Mūbī) is a 2015 Japanese film, featuring a crossover between the casts and characters of the Super Sentai television series Ressha Sentai ToQger and Zyuden Sentai Kyoryuger, including the debut appearance of the main cast of Shuriken Sentai Ninninger. Kyaeen's Hiroyuki Amano guest stars. It was released nationally in Japan on January 17, 2015.

== Story ==
Lady of the Galaxy Line informs the ToQgers that a strange energy is heading its way to Earth as it sends a Galaxy Line terminal crashing to Earth. The ToQgers investigate, finding themselves fighting a group of Cambrima and Zorima before the main five members of the Kyoryugers save them from the Deboth Army grunts. Noticing how long it has been since they fought together, the Kyoryugers take over the fight and defeat the Deboth Army minions before learning the Galaxy Line terminal is surrounded by a barrier. The Ressha arrives and Daigo, able to see it despite being an adult due, is given a special pass. Once in the Ressha, Daigo reveals the figure who created around the terminal to be the one who created his team's enemy Deboth: Creator Devius. Furthermore, Daigo explains that Devius is siphoning the Galaxy Line terminal's energy and that his team have a chance to stop him before he reaches full power to destroy Earth. Though Right offers his aid, Daigo turns down the ToQgers' help as they are unable to fight the Deboth Army and advises them to leave this to him and his team. At Castle Terminal, Crimson High Priest Salamazu appears before Emperor Zet to set up an alliance between the Shadow Line and Devius.

While waiting for a train, Utsusemimaru finds himself facing Clock Shadow and a group of Clothes before Akira arrives to aid the Kyoryuger. The two sixth-member Sentai warriors transform to fight Clock Shadow as the rest of the ToQgers arrives. The only one who knows Clock Shadow's power to de-age people with his singing voice, ToQ 6gou summons the Build Ressha to get his team and Kyoryu Gold away from Clock Shadow; the latter tries to intercept, only to be driven away by the unorthodox Shuriken Sentai Ninninger team. But Clock Shadow succeeds in restoring the ToQgers to their child forms while turning Utsusemimaru into a baby. After being driven back by Salamazu and the Shadow line, the Kyoryugers meet with the ToQgers as the latter discuss a team-up despite Daigo's refusal to her children involved. Before Right explains it is no different than before, the groups are ambushed by Clock Shadow the Clothes and Zorima. Despite the Kyoryugers' intent to protect the children, the ToQgers transform and exchange their ToQ Ressha with the Kyoryugers' Zyudenchi so the Sentai teams can combine their Imagination and Brave to defeat the grunts.

But after dissolving his partnership with the Shadow Line to steal their darkness to complete Devius's power up, Salamazu appears and absorbs Clock Shadow and the remaining grunts before he transforms into a giant box train worn by five giant Clothes. Kyoryuzin, ToQ-Oh and Build DaiOh face Salamazu before forming Gigant Kyoryuzin with Ressha and ToQ Rainbow with Zyudenchi to defeat their enemy while the ToQgers and Utsusemimaru return to their adult status. However, the victory is short-lived as Devius appears and proceeds to use the darkness Salamazu gave him to overwhelm the Sentai teams with the Kyoryugers injured. Later, at the Hyper Ressha Terminal, the ToQgers understand that they may need to fight Devius on their own as the Zyudenryu left their Zyudenchi in the terminal. Daigo, overhearing the ToQgers' discussion about protecting their families, understands them a bit better. The next morning, the Conductor, Ticket, and Wagon have gathered in the office of the President of the Rainbow Line where they meet the spirit of Torin. With Torin's cooperation, they were able to combine the giant Zyudenchi to create a Brave Zyudenchi. The attack plan is for the other ToQgers to hold off Devius' defenses when the Red Ressha gets the Brave Zyudenchi to the barrier to breakthrough.

While the others contend with Cryners and revived Shadow Creeps, ToQ 1gou reaches the terminal and faces Devius before being overwhelmed. Things seem bleak until Kyoryu Red arrives to ToQ 1gou's aid while the other Kyoryugers aid the ToQgers. After Devius achieves full power, ToQ 1gou and Kyoryu Red assume their Hyper ToQ 1gou and Kyoryu Red Carnival forms to defeat him with a Gabutyra Ressha before escaping the cave-in. But Devius is revealed to have survived as he emerges as a giant to wipe out the two Sentai teams. However, the ToQgers find unexpected help from the Shadow Line, who want revenge on Devius's treachery, along with the other Kyoryugers that Canderrilla and Luckyuro called last night. The three groups proceed to clip Devius's wings before destroying him for good. Later, the ToQgers say their goodbyes to the Kyoryugers with Daigo wishing them the best of luck at getting home someday.

== Cast ==
- Right (ライト, Raito): Jun Shison (志尊 淳, Shison Jun), Homare Mabuchi (馬渕 誉, Mabuchi Homare; Child)
- Tokatti (トカッチ, Tokatchi): Jin Hiramaki (平牧 仁, Hiramaki Jin), Keishiro Nagase (永瀬 圭志朗, Nagase Keishirō; Child)
- Mio (ミオ): Riria (梨里杏), Kaoruko Ishii (石井 薫子, Ishii Kaoruko; Child)
- Hikari (ヒカリ): Ryusei Yokohama (横浜 流星, Yokohama Ryūsei), Hikaru Yamazaki (山﨑 光, Yamazaki Hikaru; Child)
- Kagura (カグラ): Ai Moritaka (森高 愛, Moritaka Ai), Rara Shimizu (清水 らら, Shimizu Rara; Child)
- Akira Nijino (虹野 明, Nijino Akira): Shin Nagahama (長濱 慎, Nagahama Shin)
- Daigo Kiryu (桐生 ダイゴ, Kiryū Daigo): Ryo Ryusei (竜星 涼, Ryūsei Ryō)
- Ian Yorkland (イアン・ヨークランド, Ian Yōkurando): Syuusuke Saito (斉藤 秀翼, Saitō Shūsuke)
- Nobuharu Udo (有働 ノブハル, Udō Nobuharu): Yamato Kinjo (金城 大和, Kinjō Yamato)
- Souji Rippukan (立風館 ソウジ, Rippūkan Sōji): Akihisa Shiono (塩野 瑛久, Shiono Akihisa)
- Amy Yuuzuki (アミィ結月, Amyi Yūzuki): Ayuri Konno (今野 鮎莉, Konno Ayuri)
- Utsusemimaru (空蝉丸): Atsushi Maruyama (丸山 敦史, Maruyama Atsushi), Nozomu Takahashi (高橋 望, Takahashi Nozomu; Baby)
- Dark Emperor Zet (闇の皇帝ゼット, Yami no Kōtei Zetto): Kengo Ohkuchi (大口 兼悟, Ōkuchi Kengo)
- Lady (レディ, Redi): Haruka Fukuhara (福原 遥, Fukuhara Haruka)
- Conductor (車掌, Shashō): Tsutomu Sekine (関根 勤, Sekine Tsutomu)

=== Voice cast ===
- Kyoryu Cyan (キョウリュウシアン, Kyōryū Shian): Ayumi Kinoshita (木下 あゆ美, Kinoshita Ayumi)
- Kyoryu Gray (キョウリュウグレー, Kyōryū Gurē): Masayuki Deai (出合 正幸, Deai Masayuki)
- Kyoryu Violet (キョウリュウバイオレット, Kyōryū Baioretto): Marie Iitoyo (飯豊 まりえ, Iitoyo Marie)
- Kyoryu Silver (キョウリュウシルバー, Kyōryū Shirubā): Shinji Yamashita (山下 真司, Yamashita Shinji)
- Ticket (チケット, Chiketto), ToQger Equipment Voice: Kappei Yamaguchi (山口 勝平, Yamaguchi Kappei)
- Wagon (ワゴン): Yui Horie (堀江 由衣, Horie Yui)
- Rainbow Line President (レインボーライン総裁, Reinbō Rain Sōsai): Kōsuke Toriumi (鳥海 浩輔, Toriumi Kōsuke)
- Barone Nero (ネロ男爵, Nero-danshaku): Jun Fukuyama (福山 潤, Fukuyama Jun)
- Madame Noir (ノア夫人, Noa-fujin): Aya Hisakawa (久川 綾, Hisakawa Aya)
- Marchioness Mork (モルク侯爵, Moruku-kōshaku), Cryner and Castle Terminal Announcements: Reiko Suzuki (鈴木 れい子, Suzuki Reiko)
- Mikey (マイッキー, Maikkī): Kumiko Watanabe (渡辺 久美子, Watanabe Kumiko)
- Wise God Torin (賢神トリン, Kenjin Torin): Toshiyuki Morikawa (森川 智之, Morikawa Toshiyuki)
- Canderrilla (キャンデリラ, Kyanderira): Haruka Tomatsu (戸松 遥, Tomatsu Haruka)
- Luckyuro (ラッキューロ, Rakkyūro): Ai Orikasa (折笠 愛, Orikasa Ai)
- Clock Shadow (クロックシャドー, Kurokku Shadō): Masaya Onosaka (小野坂 昌也, Onosaka Masaya)
- Crimson High Priest Salamazu (紅蓮神官サラマズ, Guren Shinkan Saramazu): Hiroyuki Amano (天野 ひろゆき, Amano Hiroyuki)
- Creator Devius (創造主デビウス, Sōzōshu Debiusu): Masaki Terasoma (てらそま まさき, Terasoma Masaki)
- Aka Ninger (アカニンジャー, Aka Ninjā): Shunsuke Nishikawa (西川 俊介, Nishikawa Shunsuke)
- Ao Ninger (アオニンジャー, Ao Ninjā): Gaku Matsumoto (松本 岳, Matsumoto Gaku)
- Ki Ninger (キニンジャー, Ki Ninjā): Kaito Nakamura (中村 嘉惟人, Nakamura Kaito)
- Shiro Ninger (シロニンジャー, Shiro Ninjā): Yuuka Yano (矢野 優花, Yano Yūka)
- Momo Ninger (モモニンジャー, Momo Ninjā): Kasumi Yamaya (山谷 花純, Yamaya Kasumi)
- Kyoryuger Equipment Voice: Shigeru Chiba (千葉 繁, Chiba Shigeru)
- Ninninger Equipment Voice: Tsutomu Tareki (垂木 勉, Tareki Tsutomu)

== Reception ==
The film has earned ¥86,478,200 at the Japanese box office despite the competition from Big Hero 6, Yo-kai Watch: The Movie and Kamen Rider × Kamen Rider Drive & Gaim: Movie War Full Throttle.
