= Kaito Nakamura (footballer) =

Japanese footballer (born 2001)

Personal information
- Date of birth: 1 March 2001 (age 25)
- Place of birth: Kasukabe, Saitama, Japan
- Height: 1.75 m (5 ft 9 in)
- Position: Midfielder

Team information
- Current team: YSCC Yokohama
- Number: 29

Youth career
- 2007–2013: FC Yanaka
- 2013–2016: Kawagoe Mizuuekoen
- 2016–2019: FC Gois
- 2019–2020: Espinho
- 2020–2021: Braga

Senior career*
Years	Team	Apps	(Gls)
2022–	YSCC Yokohama	1	(0)
- * Club domestic league appearances and goals as of 17:04, 7 December 2022 (UTC)

Kaito Nakamura (中村 海渡, Nakamura Kaito; born 1 March 2001) is a Japanese footballer currently playing as a midfielder for YSCC Yokohama.

== Club career ==
Having started his career at FC Yanaka and Kawagoe Mizuuekoen, Nakamura returned to Yanaka, now known as FC Gois, before moving to Portugal to join Espinho and later Braga. On his return to Japan, he signed for J3 League side YSCC Yokohama.

== Career statistics ==
=== Club ===
As of 7 December 2022.

Club	Season	League			National Cup		League Cup		Other		Total	
Club	Season	Division	Apps	Goals	Apps	Goals	Apps	Goals	Apps	Goals	Apps	Goals
YSCC Yokohama	2022	J3 League	1	0	0	0	–		0	0	1	0
Career total			1	0	0	0	0	0	0	0	1	0
