= Hideya Tawada =

Japanese actor (born 1993)

- 多和田 秀弥
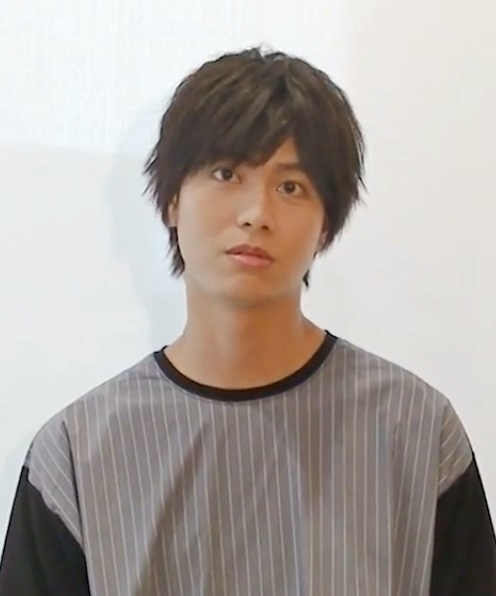
- Born: November 5, 1993 (age 32); Osaka Prefecture, Japan
- Occupation: Actor
- Years active: 2011–present

Hideya Tawada (多和田 秀弥, Tawada Hideya; born November 5, 1993 in Osaka Prefecture) is a Japanese actor who is represented by the agency GVjp. He played the role of Kinji Takigawa/Star Ninger in the 2015 Super Sentai TV series Shuriken Sentai Ninninger.

On November 2, 2018, he changed his stage name to "多和田 任益" (reading is the same but the kanji is different).

== Biography ==
Tawada won the special prize at the 2010 exclusive model audition of Fineboys. From 2012, Tawada appeared as Kunimitsu Tezuka in the Musical Prince of Tennis Second Season. From April 2015 to March 2016, he played the role of Kinji Takigawa/Star Ninger in the 39th Super Sentai series Shuriken Sentai Ninninger and in 2019, he played the role of Rentaro Kagura/Kamen Rider Shinobi in both Kamen Rider Zi-O episodes 17 and 18 and Rider Time: Kamen Rider Shinobi. Additionally, from 2017 to 2020, Tawada took to the stage to play the role of Osamu Dazai in the first four of the Bungo Stray Dogs stage play adaptations.

== Filmography ==
=== TV series ===
Year	Title	Role	Network	Notes
2015	Shuriken Sentai Ninninger	Kinji Takigawa/Star Ninger	TV Asahi	
2019	Kamen Rider Zi-O	Rentarō Kagura/Kamen Rider Shinobi/Another Shinobi	TV Asahi	Episode 17-18
2024	Sugar Dog Life	Kyōsuke Amasawa	TV Asahi	Lead role

=== Films ===
Year	Title	Role	Notes
2015	Gachiban: New Generation	Mitsuru Aida	
2015	Shuriken Sentai Ninninger the Movie: The Dinosaur Lord's Splendid Ninja Scroll!	Kinji Takigawa/Star Ninger	
2016	Shuriken Sentai Ninninger vs. ToQger the Movie: Ninja in Wonderland	Kinji Takigawa/Star Ninger	
2016	Shuriken Sentai Ninninger Returns: Ninnin Girls vs. Boys FINAL WARS	Kinji Takigawa/Star Ninger	
2017	Doubutsu Sentai Zyuohger vs. Ninninger the Movie: Super Sentai's Message from the Future	Kinji Takigawa/Star Ninger	
2017	I Hear the Sunspot	Kohei Sugihara	

=== Theater ===
Year	Title	Role	Notes
2017	Bungo Stray Dogs on Stage	Osamu Dazai	
2018	Bungo Stray Dogs on Stage: Dark Era	Osamu Dazai	
2019	Bungo Stray Dogs on Stage: Three Companies Conflict	Osamu Dazai	
2020	Bungo Stray Dogs on Stage: Untold Origins of the Detective Agency - Osamu Dazai's Entrance Exam	Osamu Dazai	Final performance; replaced by Rui Tabuchi for later stage plays
