= Kaito Nakamura (actor) =

Japanese actor and model

- 中村 嘉惟人
- Born: April 5, 1998 (age 27); Nagoya, Aichi Prefecture, Japan
- Occupation(s): Actor, model
- Years active: 2010–present
- Height: 170 cm (5 ft 7 in)

Kaito Nakamura (中村 嘉惟人, Nakamura Kaito; born April 5, 1998 in Nagoya, Aichi Prefecture) is a Japanese actor and model affiliated with Oscar Promotion. He played the role of Nagi Matsuo/Ki Ninger in the 2015 Super Sentai TV series Shuriken Sentai Ninninger.

== Biography ==
From 2010 to 2011, Nakamura made regular appearances in the NHK Educational TV series Tensai TV-kun MAX. He was an exclusive model for the fashion magazine Nico☆Petit in 2012, and for Pichi Lemon from 2013 to 2015. In 2015, Nakamura made his acting debut with the role of Nagi Matsuo/Ki Ninger in the 39th Super Sentai TV series Shuriken Sentai Ninninger.

== Filmography ==
=== TV dramas ===
Year	Title	Role	Network	Other notes
2015	Shuriken Sentai Ninninger	Nagi Matsuo/Ki Ninger	TV Asahi	

=== Films ===
Year	Title	Role	Other notes
2015	Ressha Sentai ToQger vs. Kyoryuger: The Movie	Ki Ninger (voice)	Cameo
2015	Super Hero Taisen GP: Kamen Rider 3	Nagi Matsuo/Ki Ninger	
2015	Shuriken Sentai Ninninger the Movie: The Dinosaur Lord's Splendid Ninja Scroll!	Nagi Matsuo/Ki Ninger	
2016	Shuriken Sentai Ninninger vs. ToQger the Movie: Ninja in Wonderland	Nagi Matsuo/Ki Ninger	
2016	Come Back! Shuriken Sentai Ninninger: Ninnin Girls vs. Boys FINAL WARS''	Nagi Matsuo/Ki Ninger	

=== Variety shows ===
- Shittoko! Special: Children Have Infinite Power! (TBS, 2008)
- Tensai TV-kun MAX (NHK Educational TV, 2010 - 2011) - Regular guest

=== Commercials ===
- Glade (Johnson, 2012)

=== Music videos ===
- 1 2 3 ~Love Begins~ (Ikimono-gakari, 2013)

=== Radio programs ===
- Telephone Consultation Services for Children All over Japan: Real! (TBS Radio, 2012 - 2013) - Regular guest

=== Magazines ===
- Nico☆Petit (Shinchosha, 2012) - Exclusive model
- Pichi Lemon (Gakken Plus, 2013 - 2015) - Exclusive model
