= Shuriken Sentai Ninninger =

39th season of the Super Sentai Series franchise

- Genre: Tokusatsu; Superhero fiction Action; Comedy
- Created by: TV Asahi; Toei Company; Bandai Visual
- Developed by: Kento Shimoyama
- Directed by: Shōjirō Nakazawa
- Starring: Shunsuke Nishikawa; Gaku Matsumoto; Kaito Nakamura; Yuuka Yano; Kasumi Yamaya; Hideya Tawada; Toshihiro Yashiba; Takashi Sasano
- Narrated by: Tsutomu Tareki
- Music by: Kousuke Yamashita
- Opening theme: "Saa Ike! Ninninger!"; Performed by Yohei Onishi
- Ending theme: "Nan ja Mon ja! Ninja Matsuri!"; Performed by Daiki Ise
- Country of origin: Japan
- Original language: Japanese
- No. of episodes: 47

Production
- Producers: Motoi Sasaki (TV Asahi); Chihiro Inoue (TV Asahi); Naomi Takebe (Toei); Gō Wakabayashi (Toei); Hiroaki Shibata (Toei); Kōichi Yada (Toei Agency); Akihiro Fukada (Toei Agency)
- Production location: Tokyo, Japan (Greater Tokyo Area)
- Running time: 24–25 minutes
- Production companies: TV Asahi; Toei Company; Toei Agency

Original release
- Network: TV Asahi
- Release: February 22, 2015 – February 7, 2016

Related
- Ressha Sentai ToQger; Doubutsu Sentai Zyuohger

Shuriken Sentai Ninninger (手裏剣戦隊ニンニンジャー, Shuriken Sentai Ninninjā; Shuriken Squadron Ninninger) is a Japanese television series, the 39th entry of Toei's long-running Super Sentai metaseries, following Ressha Sentai ToQger. It is the third and final ninja-based Sentai, and the fourth to be based on Japanese mythology and culture (after Samurai Sentai Shinkenger) and aired from February 22, 2015 to February 7, 2016, replacing Ressha Sentai ToQger and was replaced by Doubutsu Sentai Zyuohger. The program joining Kamen Rider Drive, and later, Kamen Rider Ghost in the Super Hero Time line-up on TV Asahi affiliate stations, until concluding on February 7, 2016. Ninninger also serves as the 40th anniversary of the franchise. The lead screenwriter for the series is Kento Shimoyama and Kousuke Yamashita serves as the series' composer. Its footage is used for the American Power Rangers season, Power Rangers Ninja Steel and its follow-up season, Power Rangers Super Ninja Steel.

The cast were introduced to the public at a special event at Tokyo Dome City on January 24 and 25, 2015. The characters themselves debuted in the film, Ressha Sentai ToQger vs. Kyoryuger: The Movie.

Ninninger began airing in South Korea as Power Rangers Ninja Force.

== Story ==
Centuries ago, the ruthless feudal warlord Gengetsu Kibaoni was slain by the Igasaki Ninja clan, before discarding his humanity to become a Yokai. In his first attempt to rise again, Kibaoni was defeated and sealed by Yoshitaka Igasaki, a man known as the Last Ninja, but three generations later, Kibaoni is unsealed by his retainer Kyuemon Izayoi. As only members of Igasaki's bloodline can stop the rampaging Yokai, Yoshitaka's son Tsumuji Igasaki assembles the Ninningers, composed of his children Takaharu and Fuka and their friends Yakumo Kato, Nagi Matsuo, and Kasumi Momochi, to master their clan's Shuriken Ninja Arts (手裏剣忍法, Shuriken Ninpō) and fight the Kibaoni Army Corps. The team is later joined by Kinji Takigawa, a Yokai Hunter from the United States who becomes Yoshitaka's disciple after earning his trust. Also, according to their grandfather, one among them will be chosen to inherit the title of Last Ninja, and become the guardian of the Igasaki family's ultimate treasure, the "End Shuriken", which is also coveted by the Kibaoni Corps in their plan to revive their master and take over the world by fear.

== Development ==
The heroes of Shuriken Sentai Ninninger; their design is meant to appeal to important aspects of modern Japanese culture while their names harken back to the first Super Sentai series, Himitsu Sentai Gorenger.

The trademark for the series was filed by Toei Company on September 25, 2014.

TV Asahi producer Chihiro Inoue brought up three ideas at the show's premiere conference. First was that they will continue to make Super Sentai fun and entertaining for children by keeping the same colorful action scenes, but they will use traditional Japanese musical themes such as those found in festival music. The second point was a desire to raise the agelessness of the series by including Toshihiro Yashiba and Takashi Sasano in the cast so adults and grandparents can enjoy the show with their children and grandchildren. The third point is that the supporting staff are all enthusiastic about the series. Inoue also wanted fans new and old to watch for the April 5, 2015 broadcast of the show (which has since been pushed back to April 12 due to Ninninger's premiere being pushed back a week) as he planned a special homage to Himitsu Sentai Gorenger, which premiered on April 5, 1975. The My Navi News reporter noted similarities between Gorenger and Ninninger, particularly how the Ninninger team members are named with Japanese color names rather than English. He also noted the prior ninja-themed Super Sentai Ninja Sentai Kakuranger and Ninpuu Sentai Hurricaneger, but felt that the story of Ninninger would be different.

Toei Company producer Naomi Takebe brought up the show's catchphrase being "Shinobi, but not hidden" (忍びなれども忍ばない, Shinobi nare domo shinobanai), explaining that they would be focusing on actual acrobatic ability in action scenes rather than relying on effects like wire work. She also brought up the nature of the series' robot, which has what initially appears to be a lack of unifying theme in its components: a humanoid robot, a dragon, a dump truck, a dog, and a train. She said that the Super Sentai series had long been keeping with these motifs in the robots, but the series' special effects director Hiroshi Butsuda had grown bored of these themes and felt the show would benefit from picking major themes from the franchise's past. Takebe also said that she hoped that the multiple components of the robot would be in line with the tenets of Cool Japan: the humanoid robot represents budō, the dog emphasizes "kawaii", the truck and train represent Japanese technology while the dragon, which is a European dragon, shows the influence on Japanese culture from abroad.

== Episodes ==
No.	Title	Written by	Original release date
1	"We Are Ninja!"; Transliteration: "Oretachi wa Ninja da!" (Japanese: 俺たちはニンジャだ！)	Kento Shimoyama	February 22, 2015
2	"Become the Last Ninja!"; Transliteration: "Rasuto Ninja ni Naru!" (Japanese: ラストニンジャになる！)	Kento Shimoyama	March 1, 2015
3	"The Formidable Enemy Gabi Appears!"; Transliteration: "Kyōteki, Gabi Arawaru!" (Japanese: 強敵、蛾眉あらわる！)	Kento Shimoyama	March 8, 2015
4	"It Is Here! Paonmaru!"; Transliteration: "Deta Zō! Paonmaru!" (Japanese: でたゾウ！パオンマル！)	Kento Shimoyama	March 15, 2015
5	"The Space Ninja UFOmaru!"; Transliteration: "Uchū Ninja Yūfōmaru!" (Japanese: 宇宙忍者UFOマル！)	Kento Shimoyama	March 22, 2015
SP	"Shuriken Sentai Ninninger vs. Kamen Rider Drive: Spring Break Combined 1 Hour Special"; Transliteration: "Shuriken Sentai Ninninjā Tai Kamen Raidā Doraibu Haruyasumi Gattai Ichijikan Supesharu" (Japanese: 手裏剣戦隊ニンニンジャーVS仮面ライダードライブ 春休み合体1時間スペシャル)	Riku Sanjo	March 29, 2015
6	"Tengu's Spiriting Away"; Transliteration: "Tengu no Kamigakushi" (Japanese: テングの神隠し)	Kento Shimoyama	April 5, 2015
7	"Spring Ninja Festival!"; Transliteration: "Haru no Ninja Matsuri!" (Japanese: 春のニンジャ祭り！)	Kento Shimoyama	April 12, 2015
8	"The Nekomata Who Leapt Through Time!"; Transliteration: "Toki o Kakeru Nekomata!" (Japanese: 時をかけるネコマタ！)	Kento Shimoyama	April 19, 2015
9	"Ninjutsu vs. Magic, the Great Battle!"; Transliteration: "Ninjutsu Tai Mahō, Dai Batoru" (Japanese: 忍術VS魔法、大バトル！)	Kento Shimoyama	April 26, 2015
10	"Yee-haw! The Golden Star Ninger"; Transliteration: "Hīhā! Kiniro no Sutāninjā" (Japanese: ヒーハー！金色のスターニンジャー)	Kento Shimoyama	May 3, 2015
11	"Shinobimaru, Come Back!"; Transliteration: "Shinobimaru, Kamu Bākku!" (Japanese: シノビマル、カムバーック！)	Kento Shimoyama	May 10, 2015
12	"Ultimate Battle! Miraculous Combination"; Transliteration: "Saikyō Kessen! Kiseki no Gattai" (Japanese: 最強決戦！奇跡の合体)	Kento Shimoyama	May 17, 2015
13	"Burn! Ninja Athletic Meet"; Transliteration: "Moeyo! Ninja Undōkai" (Japanese: 燃えよ！ニンジャ運動会)	Kento Shimoyama	May 24, 2015
14	"Beware of "Help-Me" Scam!"; Transliteration: "Tasukete Sagi ni Goyōjin!" (Japanese: 助けてサギにご用心！)	Kento Shimoyama	May 31, 2015
15	"Yokai, I Never Failed"; Transliteration: "Yōkai, Watashi Shippai Shinai node" (Japanese: 妖怪、ワタシ失敗しないので)	Kento Shimoyama	June 7, 2015
16	"The Father Tsumuji Is a Super Ninja!?"; Transliteration: "Chichi Tsumuji wa Sūpā Ninja!?" (Japanese: 父ツムジはスーパー忍者!?)	Nobuhiro Mouri	June 14, 2015
17	"Goodbye, Star Ninger!"; Transliteration: "Gubbai, Sutāninjā!" (Japanese: グッバイ、スターニンジャー！)	Kento Shimoyama	June 21, 2015
18	"The Yokai That Yakumo Loved"; Transliteration: "Yakumo ga Aishita Yōkai" (Japanese: 八雲が愛した妖怪)	Nobuhiro Mouri	June 28, 2015
19	"Find! The Sky Otomonin"; Transliteration: "Sagase! Tenkū no Otomonin" (Japanese: 探せ！天空のオトモ忍)	Kento Shimoyama	July 5, 2015
20	"The Chozetsu! Lion Haoh!"; Transliteration: "Za Chōzetsu! Raion Haō!" (Japanese: ザ・超絶！ライオンハオー！)	Kento Shimoyama	July 12, 2015
21	"Burn! Ninja Baseball of Dreams"; Transliteration: "Moeyo! Yume no Ninja Yakyū" (Japanese: 燃えよ！夢の忍者野球)	Kento Shimoyama	July 19, 2015
22	"Super Combination! Haoh Shurikenzin"; Transliteration: "Chō Gattai! Haō Shurikenjin" (Japanese: 超合体！覇王シュリケンジン)	Kento Shimoyama	July 26, 2015
23	"It's Summer! Ninja Courage Test"; Transliteration: "Natsu da! Ninja Kimodameshi" (Japanese: 夏だ！忍者キモだめし)	Kento Shimoyama	August 2, 2015
24	"It's Summer! Western Yokai Arrive in Japan!"; Transliteration: "Natsu da! Seiyō Yōkai Zokuzoku Rainichi!" (Japanese: 夏だ！西洋妖怪ぞくぞく来日！)	Kento Shimoyama	August 9, 2015
25	"It's Summer! Beware of Dracula"; Transliteration: "Natsu da! Dorakyura ni Goyōjin" (Japanese: 夏だ！ドラキュラにご用心)	Nobuhiro Mouri	August 16, 2015
26	"It's Summer! Last Ninja Race Intermediate Announcement!"; Transliteration: "Natsu da! Rasuto Ninja Rēsu Chūkan Happyō!" (Japanese: 夏だ！ラストニンジャレース中間発表！)	Nobuhiro Mouri	August 23, 2015
27	"It's Summer! Chozetsu Star Is Born!"; Transliteration: "Natsu da! Chōzetsu Sutā Tanjō!" (Japanese: 夏だ！超絶スター誕生！)	Kento Shimoyama	August 30, 2015
28	"Run! Kibaoni Ninja Army"; Transliteration: "Gekisō! Kibaoni Ninja Gundan" (Japanese: 激走！牙鬼ニンジャ軍団)	Kento Shimoyama	September 6, 2015
29	"Ninja Sugoroku Definitive Edition!"; Transliteration: "Ninja Sugoroku Ketteiban!" (Japanese: 忍者すごろく決定版！)	Kento Shimoyama	September 13, 2015
30	"Targeted Ninja School!"; Transliteration: "Nerawareta Ninja Juku!" (Japanese: ねらわれた忍者塾！)	Kento Shimoyama	September 20, 2015
31	"The Runaway Ninja!"; Transliteration: "Ninja Tōsōchū!" (Japanese: ニンジャ逃走中！)	Kento Shimoyama	September 27, 2015
32	"Gekiatsu Ninja! Acha!"; Transliteration: "Gekiatsu Ninja! Achā!" (Japanese: ゲキアツ忍者！アチャー！)	Kento Shimoyama	October 4, 2015
33	"The Kunoichi That Loved Yakumo"; Transliteration: "Yakumo o Aishita Kunoichi" (Japanese: 八雲を愛したくノ一)	Nobuhiro Mouri	October 11, 2015
34	"The Legendary World Ninja Jiraiya Appears!"; Transliteration: "Densetsu no Sekai Ninja, Jiraiya Sanjō!" (Japanese: 伝説の世界忍者、ジライヤ参上！)	Kento Shimoyama	October 18, 2015
35	"Kinji Enters the Yokai Labyrinth!"; Transliteration: "Kinji, Yōkai e no Meiro!" (Japanese: キンジ、妖怪への迷路！)	Kento Shimoyama	October 25, 2015
36	"Kinji, the Glorious Superstar!"; Transliteration: "Kinji, Eikō no Sūpāsutā!" (Japanese: キンジ、栄光のスーパースター！)	Kento Shimoyama	November 8, 2015
37	"Shuriken Legend ~The Road to Last Ninja~"; Transliteration: "Shuriken Densetsu ~Rasuto Ninja e no Michi~" (Japanese: 手裏剣伝説～ラストニンジャへの道～)	Kento Shimoyama	November 15, 2015
38	"The Little Witch Loves Yakumo?"; Transliteration: "Majokko wa Yakumo ga Osuki?" (Japanese: 魔女っ子は八雲がお好き？)	Nobuhiro Mouri	November 22, 2015
39	"Kibaoni's Son Mangetsu Appears!"; Transliteration: "Kibaoni no Musuko, Mangetsu Arawaru!" (Japanese: 牙鬼の息子、萬月あらわる！)	Nobuhiro Mouri	November 29, 2015
40	"Look Out For Santa Claus!"; Transliteration: "Abunai Santa Kurōsu!" (Japanese: あぶないサンタクロース！)	Kento Shimoyama	December 6, 2015
41	"The Five Games of the Kibaoni Party!"; Transliteration: "Kibaoni Pātī, Go-ban Shōbu!" (Japanese: 牙鬼パーティー、五番勝負！)	Kento Shimoyama	December 13, 2015
42	"Otomonin Wars! The Nekomata Strikes Back"; Transliteration: "Otomonin Wōzu! Nekomata no Gyakushū" (Japanese: オトモ忍ウォーズ！ネコマタの逆襲)	Kento Shimoyama	December 20, 2015
43	"The Legendary Ninja! Yokai Karuta Tactics"; Transliteration: "Densetsu no Ninja! Yōkai Karuta Daisakusen" (Japanese: 伝説のニンジャ！妖怪かるた大作戦)	Nobuhiro Mouri	December 27, 2015
44	"The Final Battle! The Ordeals of the Last Ninja"; Transliteration: "Saishū Kessen! Rasuto Ninja no Shiren" (Japanese: 最終決戦！ラストニンジャの試練)	Kento Shimoyama	January 17, 2016
45	"Three Generations of Fathers and Sons! All Ninjas Gathered"; Transliteration: "Oyako Sansedai! Ninja Zen'in Shūgō" (Japanese: 親子三世代！ニンジャ全員集合)	Kento Shimoyama	January 24, 2016
46	"The End Shuriken Awakens!"; Transliteration: "Owari no Shuriken, Mezameru!" (Japanese: 終わりの手裏剣、目覚める！)	Kento Shimoyama	January 31, 2016
47 (Final)	"To the Future Without Hiding, Heave-Ho!"; Transliteration: "Shinobazu Mirai e Wasshoi!" (Japanese: 忍ばず未来へワッショイ！)	Kento Shimoyama	February 7, 2016

== Films and Specials ==
The Ninningers made their first appearance as a cameo in the crossover film Ressha Sentai ToQger vs. Kyoryuger: The Movie.

=== Theatrical ===
==== Super Hero Taisen GP ====
The cast of Shuriken Sentai Ninninger appeared in Super Hero Taisen GP: Kamen Rider 3 (スーパーヒーロー大戦GP 仮面ライダー3号, Supā Hīrō Taisen Guranpuri Kamen Raidā Sangō), the 2015 entry of the "Super Hero Taisen" film series, featuring the cast of Kamen Rider Drive and the appearance of Kamen Rider 3, which was originally created by Shotaro Ishinomori for the one-shot 1972 manga Rider #3 VS. General Black (3ごうライダーたい ブラックしょうぐんのまき, Sangō Raidā Tai Burakku Shōgun no Maki). Tetsuo Kurata, (Kamen Rider Black and Black RX), Yuichi Nakamura (Kamen Rider Den-O), Kousei Amano, Takayuki Tsubaki, Ryoji Morimoto and Takahiro Hojo (Kamen Rider Blade) and Kento Handa (Kamen Rider 555) reprise their roles in the film, which opened in theaters on March 21, 2015. A new actor, Mitsuhiro Oikawa, is confirmed to perform his role as Kamen Rider 3. The events of the movie take place between Shinobi 5 and 6.

==== The Dinosaur Lord's Splendid Ninja Scroll! ====
Shuriken Sentai Ninninger the Movie: The Dinosaur Lord's Splendid Ninja Scroll! (手裏剣戦隊ニンニンジャー THE MOVIE 恐竜殿さまアッパレ忍法帖！, Shuriken Sentai Ninninjā Za Mūbī Kyōryū Tono-sama Appare Ninpōchō!) was released in Japanese theaters on August 8, 2015, double-billed with Kamen Rider Drive: Surprise Future. The events of the movie take place between Shinobi 20 and 21.

==== Ninninger vs. ToQger ====
Shuriken Sentai Ninninger vs. ToQger the Movie: Ninja in Wonderland (手裏剣戦隊ニンニンジャーVSトッキュウジャー THE MOVIE 忍者・イン・ワンダーランド, Shuriken Sentai Ninninjā Tai Tokkyūjā Za Mūbī Ninja In Wandārando) was released in Japanese theaters on January 23, 2016, featuring the casts of both Ninninger and Ressha Sentai ToQger & The heroes of Doubutsu Sentai Zyuohger also make a cameo appearance in the film. The events of the movie take place between Shinobi 42 and 43.

==== Zyuohger vs. Ninninger ====
Doubutsu Sentai Zyuohger vs. Ninninger the Movie: Super Sentai's Message from the Future (劇場版 動物戦隊ジュウオウジャーVSニンニンジャー 未来からのメッセージfromスーパー戦隊, Gekijōban Dōbutsu Sentai Jūōjā Tai Ninninjā Mirai kara no Messēji Furomu Sūpā Sentai), is a feature film featuring a crossover between Ninninger and Doubutsu Sentai Zyuohger, released on January 14, 2017.

==== Ultra Super Hero Taisen ====
A crossover film, titled Kamen Rider × Super Sentai: Ultra Super Hero Taisen (仮面ライダー×スーパー戦隊 超スーパーヒーロー大戦, Kamen Raidā × Supā Sentai Chō Supā Hīrō Taisen) featuring the casts of Kamen Rider Ex-Aid, Amazon Riders, Uchu Sentai Kyuranger, and Doubutsu Sentai Zyuohger, was released in Japan on March 25, 2017. This movie also celebrates the 10th anniversary of Kamen Rider Den-O and features the spaceship Andor Genesis from the Xevious game, which is used by the movie's main antagonists, as well as introduces the movie-exclusive Kamen Rider True Brave, played by Kamen Rider Brave's actor Toshiki Seto from Kamen Rider Ex-Aid, and the villain Shocker Great Leader III, played by the singer Diamond Yukai. In addition, individual actors from older Kamen Rider and Super Sentai TV series, Ryohei Odai (Kamen Rider Ryuki), Gaku Matsumoto (Shuriken Sentai Ninninger), Atsushi Maruyama (Zyuden Sentai Kyoryuger), and Hiroya Matsumoto (Tokumei Sentai Go-Busters) reprise their respective roles.

==== Red Battle! All Sentai Great Assemble!! ====
Kikai Sentai Zenkaiger the Movie: Red Battle! All Sentai Great Assemble!! (機界戦隊ゼンカイジャー THE MOVIE 赤い戦い！オール戦隊大集会!!, Kikai Sentai Zenkaijā Za Mūbī Akai Tatakai! Ōru Sentai Daishūkai!!) is a film released in Japanese theaters on February 20, 2021, as part of Super Sentai Movie Ranger 2021 (スーパー戦隊MOVIEレンジャー2021, Sūpā Sentai Mūbī Renjā Nisen-nijū-ichi), alongside Mashin Sentai Kiramager the Movie: Be-Bop Dream and Kishiryu Sentai Ryusoulger Special: Memory of Soulmates. Naoya Makoto (Himitsu Sentai Gorenger), Kei Hosogai (Kaizoku Sentai Gokaiger), and Jingi Irie (Kaitou Sentai Lupinranger VS Keisatsu Sentai Patranger) reprise their respective roles, and Nobutoshi Canna (Doubutsu Sentai Zyuohger) and Megumi Han (Shuriken Sentai Ninninger) reprise their respective voice roles.

=== V-Cinema ===
Shuriken Sentai Ninninger Returns: Ninnin Girls vs. Boys Final Wars (帰ってきた手裏剣戦隊ニンニンジャー ニンニンガールズVSボーイズ FINAL WARS, Kaettekita Shuriken Sentai Ninninjā Ninnin Gāruzu Tai Bōizu Fainaru Wōzu) is a direct-to-video film that was released on June 22, 2016. In the film's storyline, Fuka and Kasumi form a group called the Ninnin Girls and challenge their male teammates to a showdown. At the same time, Ariake no Kata, Mangetsu Kibaoni, and Juza Yumihari have revived and intend to take revenge on the ninjas. The events of the movie take place after the final episode of the series.

== Cast ==
- Takaharu Igasaki (伊賀崎 天晴, Igasaki Takaharu): Shunsuke Nishikawa (西川 俊介, Nishikawa Shunsuke)
- Yakumo Kato (加藤 八雲, Katō Yakumo): Gaku Matsumoto (松本 岳, Matsumoto Gaku)
- Nagi Matsuo (松尾 凪, Matsuo Nagi): Kaito Nakamura (中村 嘉惟人, Nakamura Kaito)
- Fuka Igasaki (伊賀崎 風花, Igasaki Fūka): Yuuka Yano (矢野 優花, Yano Yūka)
- Kasumi Momochi (百地 霞, Momochi Kasumi): Kasumi Yamaya (山谷 花純, Yamaya Kasumi)
- Kinji Takigawa (キンジ・タキガワ): Hideya Tawada (多和田 秀弥, Tawada Hideya)
- Tsumuji Igasaki (伊賀崎 旋風, Igasaki Tsumuji): Toshihiro Yashiba (矢柴 俊博, Yashiba Toshihiro)
- Yoshitaka Igasaki (伊賀崎 好天, Igasaki Yoshitaka): Takashi Sasano (笹野 高史, Sasano Takashi)
- ShishiOh (獅子王, Shishiō), Lion Haoh (ライオンハオー, Raion Haō; Voice): Yukio Yamagata (山形 ユキオ, Yamagata Yukio)

=== Voice cast ===
- Gengetsu Kibaoni (牙鬼 幻月, Kibaoni Gengetsu): Mugihito (麦人)
- Raizo Gabi (蛾眉 雷蔵, Gabi Raizō): Kenji Matsuda (松田 賢二, Matsuda Kenji)
- Masakage Tsugomori (晦 正影, Tsugomori Masakage): Ryūsei Nakao (中尾 隆聖, Nakao Ryūsei)
- Ariake no Kata (有明の方): Kotono Mitsuishi (三石 琴乃, Mitsuishi Kotono)
- Mangetsu Kibaoni (牙鬼 萬月, Kibaoni Mangetsu): Ryōtarō Okiayu (置鮎 龍太郎, Okiayu Ryōtarō)
- Kyuemon Izayoi (十六夜 九衛門, Izayoi Kyūemon): Megumi Han (潘 めぐみ, Han Megumi)
- Narrator, Ninninger Equipment: Tsutomu Tareki (垂木 勉, Tareki Tsutomu)

=== Guest cast ===
- Sasuke (サスケ; 7): Teruaki Ogawa (小川 輝晃, Ogawa Teruaki)
- Yousuke Shiina (椎名 鷹介, Shiina Yōsuke; 7): Shun Shioya (塩谷 瞬, Shioya Shun)
- Harukaze Kato (加藤 春風, Katō Harukaze; 9): Yuko Ito (伊藤 裕子, Itō Yūko)
- Tetsunosuke Saika the 22nd (二十二代目 雑賀 鉄之助, Nijūni-daime Saika Tetsunosuke; 19–20): Mizuki Itagaki (板垣 瑞生, Itagaki Mizuki)
- SILVER (25): SHIN (of CROSS GENE)
- Kikyo Kousaka (高坂キキョウ, Kōsaka Kikyō; 29–30): Chihiro Yamamoto (山本 千尋, Yamamoto Chihiro)
- Kiroku Ise (伊勢 喜六, Ise Kiroku; 30): Ryouma Baba (馬場 良馬, Baba Ryōma)
- Toha Yamaji (山地 闘破, Yamaji Tōha; 34): Takumi Tsutsui (筒井 巧, Tsutsui Takumi)
- Tourist (34): Yoshi Sudarso
- Elena (エレナ, Erena; 38): Seiran Kobayashi (小林 星蘭, Kobayashi Seiran)
- Tsubasa Ozu (小津 翼, Ozu Tsubasa; 38): Hiroya Matsumoto (松本 寛也, Matsumoto Hiroya)
- Shurikenger (シュリケンジャー, Shurikenjā; Voice; 43): Taiki Matsuno (松野 太紀, Matsuno Taiki)

== Songs ==
Opening theme

- "Saa Ike! Ninninger!" (さぁ行け! ニンニンジャー!, Saa Ike! Ninninjā!; "Let's Go! Ninninger!")
  - Lyrics: Neko Oikawa (及川 眠子, Oikawa Neko)
  - Composition & Arrangement: Akira Sato (佐藤 晃, Satō Akira)
  - Artist: Yohei Onishi (大西 洋平, Ōnishi Yōhei)

Ending theme

- "Nan ja Mon ja! Ninja Matsuri!" (なんじゃモンじゃ! ニンジャ祭り!; "What's That?! A Ninja Festival!")
  - Lyrics & Composition: Motoi Okuda (奥田 もとい, Okuda Motoi)
  - Arrangement: Funta 7
  - Artist: Daiki Ise (伊勢 大貴, Ise Daiki)
