= Toshihiro Yashiba =

Japanese actor

- 矢柴 俊博
- Born: October 2, 1971 (age 55); Sōka, Saitama Prefecture, Japan
- Education: Waseda University First Faculty French Literature
- Occupation: Actor
- Years active: 1994 - present
- Agent: JFCT
- Website: Official website

Toshihiro Yashiba (矢柴 俊博, Yashiba Toshihiro; born October 2, 1971, in Sōka, Saitama Prefecture, Japan) is a Japanese actor represented by JFCT.

== Filmography ==
=== TV series ===
Year	Title	Role	Notes	Ref.
2004	Shinsengumi!	Restaurant master	Taiga drama	
2005	Densha Otoko	Yasunari Kawabata		
2009	Tenchijin	Yuasa Gosuke	Taiga drama	
2009	How Do I Cope with My Husband's Depression?	Suites editor-in-chief	Miniseries	
2012	Taira no Kiyomori	Fujiwara no Korekata	Taiga drama	
2015	Shuriken Sentai Ninninger	Tsumuji Igasaki		
2016	Sanada Maru	Hosokawa Tadaoki	Taiga drama	
2019	Manpuku	Keigo Kitamura	Asadora	
2021	Kamen Rider Revice	Tasuke Ushijima		
2022	The 13 Lords of the Shogun	Taira no Tomoyasu	Taiga drama	
2022	Gannibal	Osamu Kano		
2025	Last Samurai Standing			

=== Films ===
Year	Title	Role	Notes	Ref.
2019	Fly Me to the Saitama	Ōmiya branch chief		
2020	Food Luck			
2021	Shrieking in the Rain			
2022	The Blue Skies at Your Feet			
2022	What to Do with the Dead Kaiju?	Minister of Education and Culture		
2022	Anime Supremacy!	Kawamura		
2022	Ginji the Speculator			
2023	Confess to Your Crimes			
2023	Fly Me to the Saitama: From Biwa Lake with Love	Ōmiya branch chief		
2023	When Morning Comes, I Feel Empty	Sugimoto		
2024	To Pen a Book	Tetsuhiro Ichinoseki	Lead role	
2024	Cloud	Hōjō		
2025	Fake Out			
2026	The Samurai and the Prisoner	Ikeda Izumi		
2026	Godzilla Minus Zero	Farmer of Matsumoto		
2026	Never Guilty	Ikuo Kinoshita		
