= Super Sentai =

Japanese media franchise

Super Sentai Series
- The official logo of the Super Sentai series introduced in 2000 during the run of Mirai Sentai Timeranger
- Created by: Shotaro Ishinomori; Saburo Yatsude
- Original work: Himitsu Sentai Gorenger
- Owner: Toei Company
- Years: 1975–present (hiatus since 2026)

Films and television
- Film: See below
- Television series: See below

Games
- Traditional: Rangers Strike
- Video game: Super Sentai Battle: Dice-O

Audio
- Original music: Project.R

Official website
- www.super-sentai-friends.com

The Super Sentai Series (スーパー戦隊シリーズ, Sūpā Sentai Shirīzu; lit. "Super Squadron Series") is a Japanese superhero team media franchise consisting of multiple television series and films produced by Toei Company and aired by TV Asahi. The shows are of the tokusatsu genre, featuring live action characters and colorful special effects. Prior to its hiatus, beginning in 2026, Super Sentai aired alongside the Kamen Rider series in the Super Hero Time programming block on Sunday mornings on TV Asahi. In North America, the Super Sentai series is best known as the source material for the Power Rangers series.

The series entered a hiatus following the 49th season, No.1 Sentai Gozyuger, as clarified by Toei Head of Production Shin-ichiro Shirakura, with a new Toei tokusatsu franchise, Project R.E.D., taking its timeslot in 2026.

== Series overview ==
In every Super Sentai series, the protagonists are a team of people who – using either wrist-worn or hand-held devices – transform into superheroes and gain superpowers – color-coded uniforms, signature weapons, sidearms, and fighting skills – to battle a group of otherworldly supervillains that threaten to take over the Earth. In a typical episode, the heroes thwart the enemies' plans and defeat an army of enemy soldiers and the monster of the week before an enlarged version of the monster confronts them, only to be defeated once again when the heroes fight it with their mecha.

Each Super Sentai is set within its own fictional universe. The fourth series, Denshi Sentai Denjiman, and the fifth series, Taiyo Sentai Sun Vulcan, are exceptional in that they share the same fictional universe, but there is only one cast member who appears in both works. However, on special occasions such as the Super Sentai VS series, where two Sentai teams appear together, or for some kind of memorial year project, previous Sentai teams will appear without being concerned about the consistency of the settings for each work.

It is common for teams to announce their names and titles both prior to and after transforming, often referred to as a "roll call". This is inspired by Shiranami Gonin Otoko, a kabuki play first performed in 1862. Elements of kabuki were carried over into 20th century television with the jidaigeki genre. Kazutoshi Takahashi, a stunt coordinator of Himitsu Sentai Gorenger, is credited with introducing the roll call to the first Super Sentai.

== Production ==
The first two Super Sentai series were created by Shotaro Ishinomori, then known for the 1971–1973 Kamen Rider TV series and the long-running manga Cyborg 009. He developed Himitsu Sentai Gorenger, which ran from 1975 to 1977, and J.A.K.Q. Dengekitai, which released in 1977. Toei put the franchise on hiatus in 1978. Toei then collaborated with Marvel Comics to produce a live-action Spider-Man series, which is regarded as the introduction of giant robots to tokusatsu hero shows. This concept was carried over to Toei and Marvel's next co-produced series, Battle Fever J in 1979, which was originally developed as a series based around Captain America. The next two series, Denshi Sentai Denjiman and Taiyo Sentai Sun Vulcan, were also considered co-productions, with the remainder of the series has been solely produced by Toei Company.

One of the earliest uses of the name Super Sentai to refer to the franchise was published in the Super Sentai Zukan, a series encyclopedia published by Tokuma Shoten in 1981 during the airing of Taiyo Sentai Sun Vulcan. Whilst the first episode of Kousoku Sentai Turboranger, which celebrated the alleged first ten teams, excluded the original two Ishinomori series and recognised Battle Fever J as the first, earlier releases such as the 1981 Super Sentai Zukan included them. Several early Super Sentai releases such as guidebooks and soundtrack collections have also included Ninja Captor, Kikaider, Daitetsujin 17, Space Sheriff Gavan, and others despite having no established links to Super Sentai. In 1993, the name Super Century All Sentai was introduced during the airing of Gosei Sentai Dairanger, recognising the two Ishinomori series and the Super Sentai series under one banner. During the airing of Mirai Sentai Timeranger in 2000, the franchise was officially rebranded as Super Sentai Series, with Himitsu Sentai Gorenger and J.A.K.Q. Dengekitai being formally classified under Super Sentai.

Spin-off series using familiar elements and concepts from Super Sentai have also been produced by Toei. Unofficial Sentai Akibaranger, a parody series produced by Toei and airing on BS Asahi, ran for two seasons between 2012 and 2013. In 2021, The High School Heroes mini-series aired on TV Asahi, starring Johnny's Entertainment unit Bishounen. Both productions are set in worlds where Super Sentai exists as a television series, with the protagonists being fans who become heroes themselves.

On 23 November 2025, TV Asahi announced that Super Sentai would go on hiatus after the finale of No.1 Sentai Gozyuger. A new tokusatsu franchise, Project R.E.D., took its place in the Super Hero Time programming block in February 2026. Toei's Head of Production, Shin-Ichiro Shirakura, stated that while there are no immediate plans for such, a return of Super Sentai in the future was not out of the question.

=== Main series ===
#	Title	No. of Episodes	Originally aired		Korean Power Rangers title	Power Rangers adaptation
#	Title	No. of Episodes	First aired	Last aired	Korean Power Rangers title	Power Rangers adaptation
Showa era
1	Himitsu Sentai Gorenger	84	April 5, 1975	March 26, 1977	—N/a	—N/a
2	J.A.K.Q. Dengekitai	35	April 9, 1977	December 24, 1977	—N/a	—N/a
3	Battle Fever J	52	February 3, 1979	January 26, 1980	—N/a	—N/a
4	Denshi Sentai Denjiman	51	February 2, 1980	January 31, 1981	—N/a	—N/a
5	Taiyō Sentai Sun Vulcan	50	February 7, 1981	January 30, 1982	—N/a	—N/a
6	Dai Sentai Goggle-V	50	February 6, 1982	January 20, 1983	—N/a	—N/a
7	Kagaku Sentai Dynaman	51	February 5, 1983	January 28, 1984	—N/a	—N/a
8	Chōdenshi Bioman	51	February 4, 1984	January 26, 1985	—N/a	—N/a
9	Dengeki Sentai Changeman	55	February 2, 1985	February 22, 1986	—N/a	—N/a
10	Chōshinsei Flashman	50	March 1, 1986	February 21, 1987	—N/a	—N/a
11	Hikari Sentai Maskman	51	February 28, 1987	February 20, 1988	—N/a	—N/a
12	Chōjū Sentai Liveman	49	February 27, 1988	February 18, 1989	—N/a	—N/a
Heisei era
13	Kōsoku Sentai Turboranger	50 + 1 sp.	March 4, 1989	February 23, 1990	—N/a	—N/a
14	Chikyū Sentai Fiveman	48	March 2, 1990	February 8, 1991	—N/a	—N/a
15	Chōjin Sentai Jetman	51	February 15, 1991	February 14, 1992	—N/a	—N/a
16	Kyōryū Sentai Zyuranger	50	February 21, 1992	February 12, 1993	—N/a	Mighty Morphin Power Rangers; Mighty Morphin Power Rangers: The Movie; Mighty Morphin Power Rangers: Once & Always
17	Gosei Sentai Dairanger	50	February 19, 1993	February 11, 1994	—N/a	Mighty Morphin Power Rangers; Mighty Morphin Power Rangers: The Movie
18	Ninja Sentai Kakuranger	53	February 18, 1994	February 24, 1995	—N/a	Mighty Morphin Power Rangers; Mighty Morphin Alien Rangers; Mighty Morphin Power Rangers: The Movie
19	Chōriki Sentai Ohranger	48	March 3, 1995	February 23, 1996	—N/a	Power Rangers Zeo
20	Gekisō Sentai Carranger	48	March 1, 1996	February 7, 1997	—N/a	Turbo: A Power Rangers Movie; Power Rangers Turbo
21	Denji Sentai Megaranger	51	February 14, 1997	February 15, 1998	—N/a	Power Rangers in Space
22	Seijū Sentai Gingaman	50	February 22, 1998	February 14, 1999	—N/a	Power Rangers Lost Galaxy
23	Kyūkyū Sentai GoGoFive	50	February 21, 1999	February 6, 2000	—N/a	Power Rangers Lightspeed Rescue
24	Mirai Sentai Timeranger	50 + 1 sp.	February 13, 2000	February 4, 2001	—N/a	Power Rangers Time Force
25	Hyakujū Sentai Gaoranger	51	February 18, 2001	February 10, 2002	Power Rangers Jungle Force	Power Rangers Wild Force
26	Ninpū Sentai Hurricaneger	51	February 17, 2002	February 9, 2003	—N/a	Power Rangers Ninja Storm
27	Bakuryū Sentai Abaranger	50	February 16, 2003	February 8, 2004	Power Rangers Dino Thunder	Power Rangers Dino Thunder
28	Tokusō Sentai Dekaranger	50	February 15, 2004	February 6, 2005	Power Rangers S.P.D.	Power Rangers S.P.D.
29	Mahō Sentai Magiranger	49	February 13, 2005	February 12, 2006	Power Rangers Magic Force	Power Rangers Mystic Force
30	GoGo Sentai Boukenger	49	February 19, 2006	February 11, 2007	Power Rangers Treasure Force	Power Rangers Operation Overdrive
31	Jūken Sentai Gekiranger	49	February 18, 2007	February 10, 2008	Power Rangers Wild Spirits	Power Rangers Jungle Fury
32	Engine Sentai Go-Onger	50	February 17, 2008	February 8, 2009	Power Rangers Engine Force	Power Rangers RPM
33	Samurai Sentai Shinkenger	49	February 15, 2009	February 7, 2010	—N/a	Power Rangers Samurai; Power Rangers Super Samurai
34	Tensō Sentai Goseiger	50	February 14, 2010	February 6, 2011	Power Rangers Miracle Force	Power Rangers Megaforce; Power Rangers Super Megaforce
35	Kaizoku Sentai Gokaiger	51	February 13, 2011	February 19, 2012	Power Rangers Captain Force	Power Rangers Super Megaforce
36	Tokumei Sentai Go-Busters	50	February 26, 2012	February 10, 2013	Power Rangers Go-Busters	Power Rangers Beast Morphers
37	Zyuden Sentai Kyoryuger	48	February 17, 2013	February 9, 2014	Power Rangers Dino Force	Power Rangers Dino Charge; Power Rangers Dino Super Charge
38	Ressha Sentai ToQger	47	February 16, 2014	February 15, 2015	Power Rangers Train Force	—N/a
39	Shuriken Sentai Ninninger	47	February 22, 2015	February 7, 2016	Power Rangers Ninja Force	Power Rangers Ninja Steel; Power Rangers Super Ninja Steel
40	Dōbutsu Sentai Zyuohger	48	February 14, 2016	February 5, 2017	Power Rangers Animal Force	—N/a
41	Uchū Sentai Kyuranger	48	February 12, 2017	February 4, 2018	Power Rangers Galaxy Force	Power Rangers Cosmic Fury
42	Kaitō Sentai Lupinranger VS Keisatsu Sentai Patranger	51	February 11, 2018	February 10, 2019	Power Rangers Lupin Force vs Patrol Force	—N/a
—	Super Sentai Strongest Battle	4	February 17, 2019	March 10, 2019	—N/a	—N/a
43	Kishiryū Sentai Ryusoulger	48	March 17, 2019	March 1, 2020	Power Rangers Dino Soul	Power Rangers Dino Fury; Power Rangers Cosmic Fury
Reiwa era
44	Mashin Sentai Kiramager	46 + 4 sp.	March 8, 2020	February 28, 2021	—N/a	—N/a
45	Kikai Sentai Zenkaiger	49	March 7, 2021	February 27, 2022	Power Rangers Zenkaiser	—N/a
46	Avataro Sentai Donbrothers	50	March 6, 2022	February 26, 2023	Power Rangers Donbrothers	—N/a
47	Ōsama Sentai King-Ohger	50	March 5, 2023	February 25, 2024	Power Rangers Kingdom Force	—N/a
48	Bakuage Sentai Boonboomger	48	March 3, 2024	February 9, 2025	Power Rangers Boomboom Force	—N/a
49	No.1 Sentai Gozyuger	49	February 16, 2025	February 8, 2026	Power Rangers No. 1 Force	—N/a

=== Theatrical releases ===
- 1975: Himitsu Sentai Gorenger (Movie version of episode 6)
- 1975: Himitsu Sentai Gorenger: The Blue Fortress (Movie version of episode 15)
- 1976: Himitsu Sentai Gorenger: The Red Death Match (Movie version of episode 36)
- 1976: Himitsu Sentai Gorenger: The Bomb Hurricane
- 1976: Himitsu Sentai Gorenger: Fire Mountain's Final Explosion (Movie version of episode 54)
- 1977: J.A.K.Q. Dengekitai (Movie version of episode 7)
- 1978: J.A.K.Q. Dengekitai vs. Gorenger
- 1979: Battle Fever J (Movie version of episode 5)
- 1980: Denshi Sentai Denjiman
- 1981: Taiyo Sentai Sun Vulcan
- 1982: Dai Sentai Goggle-V
- 1983: Kagaku Sentai Dynaman
- 1984: Choudenshi Bioman
- 1985: Dengeki Sentai Changeman
- 1985: Dengeki Sentai Changeman: Shuttle Base! Crisis!
- 1986: Choushinsei Flashman
- 1987: Choushinsei Flashman: Big Rally! Titan Boy!! (Movie version of episodes 15–18)
- 1987: Hikari Sentai Maskman
- 1989: Kousoku Sentai Turboranger
- 1993: Gosei Sentai Dairanger
- 1994: Ninja Sentai Kakuranger
- 1994: Super Sentai World
- 1994: Toei Hero Daishugō
- 1995: Chouriki Sentai Ohranger
- 2001: Hyakujuu Sentai Gaoranger: The Fire Mountain Roars
- 2002: Ninpu Sentai Hurricanger: Shushutto The Movie
- 2003: Bakuryū Sentai Abaranger DELUXE: Abare Summer is Freezing Cold!
- 2004: Tokusou Sentai Dekaranger The Movie: Full Blast Action
- 2005: Mahō Sentai Magiranger The Movie: Bride of Infershia ~Maagi Magi Giruma Jinga~
- 2006: GoGo Sentai Boukenger The Movie: The Greatest Precious
- 2007: Juken Sentai Gekiranger: Nei-Nei! Hou-Hou! Hong Kong Decisive Battle
- 2008: Engine Sentai Go-onger: Boom Boom! Bang Bang! GekijōBang!!
- 2009: Engine Sentai Go-onger vs. Gekiranger
- 2009: Samurai Sentai Shinkenger the Movie: The Fateful War
- 2010: Samurai Sentai Shinkenger vs. Go-onger: GinmakuBang!!
- 2010: Tensou Sentai Goseiger: Epic on the Movie
- 2011: Tensou Sentai Goseiger vs. Shinkenger: Epic on Ginmaku
- 2011: Gokaiger Goseiger Super Sentai 199 Hero Great Battle
- 2011: Kaizoku Sentai Gokaiger the Movie: The Flying Ghost Ship
- 2012: Kaizoku Sentai Gokaiger vs. Space Sheriff Gavan: The Movie
- 2012: Kamen Rider × Super Sentai: Super Hero Taisen
- 2012: Tokumei Sentai Go-Busters the Movie: Protect the Tokyo Enetower!
- 2013: Tokumei Sentai Go-Busters vs. Kaizoku Sentai Gokaiger: The Movie
- 2013: Kamen Rider × Super Sentai × Space Sheriff: Super Hero Taisen Z
- 2013: Zyuden Sentai Kyoryuger: Gaburincho of Music
- 2014: Zyuden Sentai Kyoryuger vs. Go-Busters: The Great Dinosaur Battle! Farewell Our Eternal Friends
- 2014: Heisei Riders vs. Shōwa Riders: Kamen Rider Taisen feat. Super Sentai
- 2014: Ressha Sentai ToQger the Movie: Galaxy Line S.O.S.
- 2015: Ressha Sentai ToQger vs. Kyoryuger: The Movie
- 2015: Super Hero Taisen GP: Kamen Rider 3
- 2015: Shuriken Sentai Ninninger the Movie: The Dinosaur Lord's Splendid Ninja Scroll!
- 2016: Shuriken Sentai Ninninger vs. ToQger the Movie: Ninja in Wonderland
- 2016: Doubutsu Sentai Zyuohger the Movie: The Exciting Circus Panic!
- 2017: Doubutsu Sentai Zyuohger vs. Ninninger the Movie: Super Sentai's Message from the Future
- 2017: Kamen Rider × Super Sentai: Ultra Super Hero Taisen
- 2017: Uchu Sentai Kyuranger the Movie: Gase Indaver Strikes Back
- 2018: Kaitou Sentai Lupinranger VS Keisatsu Sentai Patranger en Film
- 2019: Kishiryu Sentai Ryusoulger the Movie: Time Slip! Dinosaur Panic
- 2020: Kishiryu Sentai Ryusoulger VS Lupinranger VS Patranger
- 2020: Mashin Sentai Kiramager: Episode Zero
- 2021: Kishiryu Sentai Ryusoulger Special Chapter: Memory of Soulmates
- 2021: Mashin Sentai Kiramager the Movie: Bee-Bop Dream
- 2021: Kikai Sentai Zenkaiger the Movie: Red Battle! All Sentai Rally!!
- 2021: Saber + Zenkaiger: Superhero Senki
- 2022: Avataro Sentai Donbrothers the Movie: New First Love Hero
- 2023: Ohsama Sentai King-Ohger the Movie: Adventure Heaven
- 2024: Bakuage Sentai Boonboomger: GekijōBoon! Promise the Circuit
- 2025: No.1 Sentai Gozyuger: Tega Sword of Resurrection

=== V-Cinema releases ===
- 1996: Chōriki Sentai Ohranger: Ohré vs. Kakuranger
- 1997: Gekisou Sentai Carranger vs. Ohranger
- 1998: Denji Sentai Megaranger vs. Carranger
- 1999: Seijuu Sentai Gingaman vs. Megaranger
- 1999: Kyuukyuu Sentai GoGoFive: Sudden Shock! A New Warrior!
- 2000: Kyuukyuu Sentai GoGoFive vs. Gingaman
- 2001: Mirai Sentai Timeranger vs. GoGoFive
- 2001: Hyakujuu Sentai Gaoranger vs. Super Sentai
- 2003: Ninpu Sentai Hurricanger vs. Gaoranger
- 2004: Bakuryū Sentai Abaranger vs. Hurricanger
- 2005: Tokusou Sentai Dekaranger vs. Abaranger
- 2006: Mahō Sentai Magiranger vs. Dekaranger
- 2007: GoGo Sentai Boukenger vs. Super Sentai
- 2008: Juken Sentai Gekiranger vs. Boukenger
- 2010: Samurai Sentai Shinkenger Returns
- 2011: Tensou Sentai Goseiger Returns
- 2013: Tokumei Sentai Go-Busters Returns vs. Dōbutsu Sentai Go-Busters
- 2013: Ninpu Sentai Hurricanger: 10 Years After
- 2014: Zyuden Sentai Kyoryuger: 100 Years After
- 2015: Ressha Sentai ToQger Returns
- 2015: Tokusou Sentai Dekaranger: 10 Years After
- 2016: Shuriken Sentai Ninninger Returns
- 2017: Doubutsu Sentai Zyuohger Returns: Give Me Your Life! Earth Champion Tournament
- 2017: Space Squad: Uchuu Keiji Gavan vs. Tokusou Sentai Dekaranger
- 2017: Uchu Sentai Kyuranger: Episode of Stinger
- 2018: Uchu Sentai Kyuranger vs. Space Squad
- 2018: Engine Sentai Go-Onger: 10 Years Grand Prix
- 2019: Lupinranger VS Patranger VS Kyuranger
- 2021: Kiramager VS Ryusoulger
- 2021: Kaizoku Sentai: Ten Gokaiger
- 2022: Kikai Sentai Zenkaiger vs. Kiramager vs. Senpaiger
- 2023: Avataro Sentai Donbrothers VS Zenkaiger
- 2023: Ninpu Sentai Hurricanger Degozaru! Shushuuto 20th Anniversary
- 2023: Bakuryu Sentai Abaranger 20th: The Unforgivable Abare
- 2024: Tokusou Sentai Dekaranger 20th: Fireball Booster
- 2024: Ohsama Sentai King-Ohger vs. Donbrothers
- 2024: Ohsama Sentai King-Ohger vs. Kyoryuger
- 2025: Bakuage Sentai Boonboomger vs. King-Ohger
- 2026: No. 1 Sentai Gozyuger vs. Boonboomger

=== Extras ===
- 2010: Super Sentai Versus Series Theater
- 2012–2013: Unofficial Sentai Akibaranger
- 2021: The High School Heroes

=== Others ===
- 2017: Zyuden Sentai Kyoryuger Brave (South Korea)

== Distribution and overseas adaptations ==
Although the Super Sentai series originated in Japan, various Sentai series have been imported and dubbed in other languages for broadcast in several different countries.

=== United States ===
After Honolulu's KIKU-TV had success with Android Kikaider (marketed as Kikaida) and Kamen Rider V3 in the 1970s, multiple Super Sentai series, including Himitsu Sentai Gorenger and Battle Fever J, were brought to the Hawaiian market, broadcast in Japanese with English subtitles by JN Productions. In 1985, Marvel Comics produced a pilot for an American adaptation of Super Sentai, but the show was rejected by the major American TV networks. In 1986, Saban Productions produced a pilot for an American adaptation of Choudenshi Bioman titled Bio Man. In 1987, some episodes of Kagaku Sentai Dynaman were dubbed and aired as a parody on the USA Network television show Night Flight.

In 1993, American production company Saban Entertainment adapted 1992's Kyōryū Sentai Zyuranger into Mighty Morphin Power Rangers for the Fox Kids programming block, combining the original Japanese action footage with new footage featuring American actors for the story sequences. Since then, nearly every Super Sentai series that followed became a new season of Power Rangers. In 2002, Saban sold the Power Rangers franchise to Disney's Buena Vista division, who owned it until 2010, broadcasting Power Rangers on ABC Kids, ABC Family, Jetix, and Toon Disney. On 12 May 2010, Saban bought the franchise back from Disney, moving the show to the Nickelodeon network for 2011 with Power Rangers Samurai.

On 25 July 2014, Shout! Factory announced that they would release Zyuranger on DVD in the United States. They have since been the official distributor of Super Sentai in North America, and as of 2024 have released all subsequent series up to Dekaranger, plus Jetman and Fiveman. Shout! also provides episodes on demand via Shout! TV since 2016. Super Sentai episodes are also available to watch on the free streaming service, Tubi until 2026.

On 1 May 2018, toy company Hasbro announced they had acquired the Power Rangers franchise from Saban Capital Group for $522 million. In 2023, Power Rangers Cosmic Fury was released on Netflix, and was the first Power Rangers series to not be a direct adaptation of a Super Sentai series. Instead, the production used mostly original costumes that were adapted from Kishiryu Sentai Ryusoulger, the basis of its previous season, Power Rangers Dino Fury.

On April 2, 2025, Toei Company president and CEO Fumio Yoshimura revealed that Toei Company would not be involved in the production of an upcoming live-action Power Rangers reboot series being produced by Hasbro and 20th Century Television.

=== South Korea ===
Super Sentai has been broadcast in South Korea, dubbed in Korean. The first such series was Choushinsei Flashman which aired as Jigu Bangwidae Flash Man (Earth Defence Squadron Flashman), released in video format in 1989 by the Daeyung Panda video company; this was followed by Hikari Sentai Maskman and Chodenshi Bioman. Throughout the 1990s, Dai Sentai Goggle Five, Dengeki Sentai Changeman, Choujyu Sentai Liveman, and Kousoku Sentai Turboranger were also released in video format. In the 2000s and early 2010s, Tooniverse (formerly Orion Cartoon Network), JEI-TV (Jaeneung Television), Champ TV/Anione TV (Daewon Broadcasting), Cartoon Network South Korea, and Nickelodeon South Korea have broadcast Super Sentai series a year following their original Japanese broadcast, but have changed the titles to "Power Rangers".

=== Vietnam ===
In Vietnam, the Super Sentai series were released with voice-over dubs for years. In 2003, Hyakujuu Sentai Gaoranger was the first Super Sentai season to be released in VCD and DVD, and became a hit in the country. Later Super Sentai seasons were broadcast on local and cable TV. Recently, the most recent Super Sentai seasons are subbed by fans and shared online.

== Merchandise ==
As of March 2021, Bandai Namco has sold 30.89 million Super Sentai shape-changing model robots since 1979.

Bandai Namco Super Sentai retail sales
Fiscal period	Net sales	Notes	Ref
April 2002 to December 2005	¥108.9 billion	Bandai sales	
April 2006 to March 2007	¥10.1 billion	Toy sales	
April 2007 to March 2012	¥102.4 billion		
April 2002 to March 2012	¥221.4 billion ($2,775 million)		
April 2012 to March 2013	¥20.8 billion ($261 million)		
April 2013 to March 2014	¥25.3 billion ($259 million)		
April 2014 to December 2020	¥103.3 billion ($1,002 million)		
April 2002 to December 2020	¥370.8 billion ($4.298 billion)		

Super Sentai licensed merchandise in Japan
Year	Retail sales	Ref
2003	¥24 billion	
2008	¥37.28 billion	
2010	¥24.58 billion	
2012	¥40.96 billion	
2013	¥37.99 billion	
2014	¥39.21 billion	
2003 to 2014	¥204.02 billion+ ($2.349 billion+)	

Sentai licensed merchandise outside Japan
Year(s)	Retail sales	Ref
1993 to 1999	$6 billion	
2005	$112 million	
2006	$131 million	
2012	$300 million	
2013	$333 million	
2014	$326 million	
2015	$330 million	
2016	$361 million	
2017	$548 million	
2018	$281 million	
1993 to 2018	$8.722 billion+	

== Parody and homage ==
The Super Sentai Series has been parodied and emulated in various ways throughout the world. The term "Sentai" is also occasionally used to describe shows with premises like the Super Sentai Series.

=== Dai-Nippon ===
Gainax produced a Japanese fan film called Patriotic Squadron Great Japan (愛國戰隊大日本, Aikoku Sentai Dai-Nippon) in 1982 as a homage to the Super Sentai franchise.

=== Sport Ranger ===
The Thai television series Sport Ranger, another homage to Super Sentai, aired in 2006.

=== France Five ===
Jushi Sentai France Five (later known as Shin Kenjushi France Five) is a French online mini-series that was released in six instalments from 2000 to 2013.

=== Legendary Armor Samurai Troopers ===
Known as Ronin Warriors in the English dub, this anime involved five young warriors each in possession of mystical armor and weapons which allowed them to transform into more powerful forms, similar to Super Sentai.

=== Sailor Moon ===
Naoko Takeuchi used Super Sentai as inspiration for the creation of the Sailor Soldiers in Sailor Moon.

=== Digimon Frontier ===
The fourth entry of the Digimon anime involved five young kids (eventually six) to gain Digivices known as D-tectors which contained the spirits of ancient heroes known as the Ten Legendary Warriors that allowed them to transform into Digimon forms to fight off monsters in a manner reminiscent of Super Sentai.

=== Jeanne d'Arc ===
The Jeanne d'Arc PSP game made by Level 5 which depicts the title character (voiced by Maaya Sakamoto in Japanese and Kari Wahlgren in English respectively) in a fantasy universe based on the historical story has her and certain others with the power to transform into armored warriors akin to Super Sentai.

=== Kingdom Hearts ===
The PSP prequel entry to the Kingdom Hearts video game franchise made by Square-Enix involves the main characters (Terra, Aqua, and Ventus) transforming into magical armor akin to Super Sentai.

=== Sparanger ===
As part of the Omoikkiri Ii!! TV television program, a series of features was produced on various spas and onsen around Japan titled Bihada Sentai Sparanger (美肌泉隊ＳＰＡレンジャー, Bihada Sentai Suparenjā; Handsome Muscle Spring Corps Sparanger). This featured tokusatsu and drama actors Takashi Hagino (Changéríon of Choukou Senshi Changéríon and Kamen Rider Ouja of Kamen Rider Ryuki) as Spa Red (ＳＰＡレッド, Supa Reddo), Kento Handa (Kamen Rider Faiz of Kamen Rider 555) as Spa Blue (ＳＰＡブルー, Supa Burū), Kengo Ohkuchi (Emperor Z of Ressha Sentai ToQger) as Spa Green (ＳＰＡグリーン, Supa Gurīn), Masashi Mikami (Bouken Blue in GoGo Sentai Boukenger) as Spa Yellow (ＳＰＡイエロー, Supa Ierō), and Kohei Murakami (Kamen Rider Kaixa in Kamen Rider 555) as Spa Murasaki (ＳＰＡムラサキ（紫）, Supa Murasaki; "purple" or "violet" in Japanese, a running joke would involve people referring to him as Spa Purple).

=== EA's Rock ===
In 2013, Gainax produced EA's Rock (エアーズロック, Eāzu Rokku), a 13-episode miniseries of live-action shorts which parodied the Super Sentai Series. The series' characters are all former members of a fighting group called Sensation Warriors Gokan Five (感覚戦士ゴカンファイブ, Kankaku Senshi Gokan Faibu; "gokan" is Japanese for the "five senses"). EA's Rock is broadcast on the Tōmeihan Net 6 Japanese Association of Independent Television Stations as well as Nico Nico Douga.

=== Love After World Domination ===
The manga/anime series Love After World Domination is a satire on the tokusatsu genre, with a team of multi-colored heroes wearing spandex suits to fight against an organization bent on world domination, similar to the various Super Sentai series.

=== Dragon Ball ===
Akira Toriyama was inspired to create the Ginyu Force for the Dragon Ball manga after seeing his children watch Super Sentai.

=== The Red Ranger Becomes an Adventurer in Another World ===
The manga/anime series The Red Ranger Becomes an Adventurer in Another World is about the leader of a team of heroes called Adhesive Squadron Kizuna Five (絆創戦隊キズナファイブ, Bansō Sentai Kizuna Faibu), getting transported to another world after sacrificing himself in their final battle. Additionally, the series frequently flashbacks to Red's time leading the Kizuna Five, with veteran Sentai actors voicing the other members of the team in the anime.

=== Ryuji Five (TV Series) ===
Ryuji Five Also D-5 Warriors (ริวจิไฟว์) It is A Thai Animation Based On Apex Toys' Tokusatsu (Super Sentai) hero series produced in Thailand Released On VCD By TIGA

=== Giga Tribe (Tv Series 2008) ===
Gigatribe In (기가트라이브) It is a Korean animation that aired from late 2008 to early 2009.
