= List of Doubutsu Sentai Zyuohger characters =

Doubutsu Sentai Zyuohger (動物戦隊ジュウオウジャー, Dōbutsu Sentai Jūōjā) is a Japanese tokusatsu series that serves as the 40th installment in the Super Sentai franchise and the 28th entry in the Heisei era. The eponymous Zyuohgers, consisting of two humans and five anthropomorphic animals known as "Zyumans", protect the Earth from the evil Dethgaliens, who wish to use the planet as the venue for their latest Blood Game.

== Main characters ==
=== Zyuohgers ===
The main heroes of Doubutsu Sentai Zyuohger. From left to right: Amu, Leo, Yamato Kazakiri, Misao Mondo, Sela, and Tusk.

The eponymous Zyuohgers are composed of four Zyumans (ジューマン, Jūman), humanoids with animal features from a pocket dimension called Zyuland (ジューランド, Jūrando), and one human who fight together to defend Earth from the Dethgaliens. They later gain another human member who was originally captured and brainwashed to fight for the Dethgaliens, but joins their side after he breaks free from the villains' control with their help.

Each primary member carries a cuboid Zyuoh Changer (ジュウオウチェンジャー, Jūō Chenjā) cellphone, which disguises the Zyuman members as humans, as their transformation device along with a Zyuoh Buster (ジュウオウバスター, Jūō Basutā), which has a Gun Mode (銃モード, Jū Mōdo) for performing the Zyuoh Shoot (ジュウオウシュート, Jūō Shūto) finisher and a Sword Mode (剣モード, Ken Mōdo) for performing the Zyuoh Slash (ジュウオウスラッシュ, Jūō Surasshu) finisher, as their sidearm. While transformed, they gain the use of the Wild Release (野生解放, Yasei Kaihō) ability to manifest certain features based on their associated animal.

==== Yamato Kazakiri ====
Yamato Kazakiri (風切 大和, Kazakiri Yamato) is a young zoologist with empathy for humans and animals alike. During his childhood, Yamato ran away from home to escape his father, Kageyuki, whom he resented for not being with his dying mother in her final hours, only to get lost during a storm until a mysterious eagle Zyuman, Bud, rescued him and presented Yamato with a Champion's Proof (王者の資格, Ōja no Shikaku), (Note: "Proof" (資格, Shikaku) is a homophone of "Square" (四角, Shikaku) in Japanese.) which he kept as a good luck charm ever since.

Years later, Yamato discovers the Link Cube (リンクキューブ, Rinku Kyūbu), a structure that serves as the gateway between Earth and Zyuland, and uses the Champion's Proof to travel to the latter location, where he meets four Zyumans who also possess Champion's Proofs. Upon returning to Earth and learning of the Dethgaliens' attack, their Proofs transform into the Zyuoh Changers and allow them to fight back. However, the Link Cube is destroyed during the battle and the fledgling Zyuohgers discover they need six Champion's Proofs to fix it, but the sixth Proof has gone missing. Despite this, Yamato takes in the stranded Zyumans and continues to lead them in their fight against the Dethgaliens. Later in the series, Yamato goes on to discover Bud's connection to Kageyuki and why the latter was unable to see his mother before reconciling with his father.

As the red-colored "Champion of the Skies" (大空の王者, Ōzora no Ōja), Zyuoh Eagle (ジュウオウイーグル, Jūō Īguru), Yamato can use his Wild Release to manifest a pair of eagle wings that allow him to fly at high-speeds. He also wields the extendable Eagriser (イーグライザー, Īguraizā) sword, which allows him to perform the Riser Spinning Slash (ライザースピニングスラッシュ, Raizā Supiningu Surasshu) finisher. Moreover, Yamato gains enhanced eyesight as a result of becoming a Zyuohger. He acquires additional powers and forms amidst his battles with the Dethgaliens, which are as follows:

- Zyuoh Gorilla (ジュウオウゴリラ, Jūō Gorira): An auxiliary form, also known as the "Champion of the Jungle" (ジャングルの王者, Janguru no Ōja), achieved by absorbing Larry's Zyuman energy that grants aerokinesis and superhuman strength. Yamato's finisher in this form is the Gorilla Super Punch (ゴリラスーパーパンチ, Gorira Sūpā Panchi).
- Zyuoh Whale (ジュウオウホエール, Jūō Hoēru): Yamato's power-up form, also known as the "Champion of Champions" (王者の中の王者, Ōja no Naka no Ōja), accessed from the Whale Change Gun (ホエールチェンジガン, Hoēru Chenji Gan) that grants underwater breathing capabilities. His finisher in this form is the Zyuoh Final (ジュウオウファイナル, Jūō Fainaru).

During the Zyuohgers' final battle against Ginis, Yamato is empowered by the Earth's energy and gains the ability to activate a Great Wild Release similarly to Zyuoh The World's where he combines all of his forms' powers.

During the events of the film Doubutsu Sentai Zyuohger Returns: Give Me Your Life! Earth Champion Tournament, Yamato uses Cube Condor's power to fuse with Bud and transform into the violet-colored "Champion of the Blue Skies" (蒼穹の王者, Sōkyū no Ōja), Zyuoh Condor (ジュウオウコンドル, Jūō Kondoru), gaining the combined usage of both of their abilities and weapons.

Yamato Kazakiri is portrayed by Masaki Nakao (中尾 暢樹, Nakao Masaki). As a child, Yamato is portrayed by Shuri Ayuba (阿由葉 朱凌, Ayuba Shuri).

==== Sela ====
Sela (セラ, Sera) is a competitive blue shark Zyuman with a sharp sense of hearing, disdain for showing weakness, and a rivalry with Leo for letting her win a duel in the past due to his weakness around women. Following the Dethgaliens' defeat and Earth and Zyuland's union, she goes on to work at a children's home for humans and Zyumans.

As the blue-colored "Champion of the Rough Seas" (荒海の王者, Araumi no Ōja), Zyuoh Shark (ジュウオウシャーク, Jūō Shāku), Sela can use her Wild Release to manifest a shark dorsal fin that allows her to swim through any surface and perform a buzzsaw-like spin attack.

Sela is portrayed by Miki Yanagi (柳 美稀, Yanagi Miki).

==== Leo ====
Leo (レオ, Reo) is a calm yet foul-tempered lion Zyuman with a loud roar who is sensitive to his surroundings and considerate towards those he considers weaker than himself. He holds a strong bond (implied to be romantic) with Amu as a fellow feline warrior and often teams up with her; sharing her love of protecting those not as strong as them. During his time on Earth, he ends up finding an interest in sumo wrestling alongside Amu. After the Dethgaliens' defeat, he reunites with his family and joins a band.

As the yellow-colored "Champion of the Savanna" (サバンナの王者, Saban'na no Ōja), Zyuoh Lion (ジュウオウライオン, Jūō Raion), Leo can use his Wild Release to manifest a pair of lion claw-like gauntlets that increase his offensive capabilities.

Leo is portrayed by Shohei Nanba (南羽 翔平, Nanba Shōhei).

==== Tusk ====
Tusk (タスク, Tasuku) is an intelligent elephant Zyuman with a sharp sense of smell who comes from a wealthy family, displays a soft spot for Sela, and initially refuses to work with Yamato, believing the human stole his Champion's Proof until he learns of Yamato's past. Following the Dethgaliens' defeat, Tusk goes on to study at a university.

As the green-colored "Champion of the Forests" (森林の王者, Shinrin no Ōja), Zyuoh Elephant (ジュウオウエレファント, Jūō Erefanto), Tusk can use his Wild Release to manifest a pair of elephant hoof-like sabatons that allow him to produce shockwaves with his stomps.

Tusk is portrayed by Tsurugi Watanabe (渡邉 剣, Watanabe Tsurugi).

==== Amu ====
Amu (アム) is a mischievous yet shrewd white tiger Zyuman with a sharp sense of taste who is prone to helping those in need, easily influenced by trends, and displays an affinity for anything she considers pretty. She and Leo are shown to be particularly close with each other on the team, due to being fellow felines and sharing a strong sense of helping the innocent. Like Leo, she is an avid martial artist open to learning new styles; even taking up sumo wresting with him. Following the Dethgaliens' defeat, Amu finds work as a fashion model.

As the white-colored "Champion of the Snow Fields" (雪原の王者, Setsugen no Ōja), Zyuoh Tiger (ジュウオウタイガー, Jūō Taigā), Amu can use her Wild Release to manifest a pair of tiger claw-like gauntlets that increase her attack range.

Amu is portrayed by Haruka Tateishi (立石 晴香, Tateishi Haruka).

==== Misao Mondo ====
Misao Mondo (門藤 操, Mondō Misao) is a human introvert who has had problems befriending others since childhood and is prone to becoming easily depressed when faced with criticism or failure. Because of his desire to gain friends and get stronger, he was kidnapped and brainwashed by the Dethgaliens to fight for them as an Extra Player (エクストラプレイヤー, Ekusutora Pureiyā). After being forcibly infused with the power of a rhinoceros, crocodile, and wolf Zyuman that the Dethgaliens captured, Misao is transformed into a tricolored artificial Zyuohger called The World (ザワールド, Za Wārudo) and tasked with stopping the Zyuohgers from interfering with their Blood Game. After the Zyuohgers free him from the Dethgaliens' control and he receives encouragement from the souls of the Zyumans whose energy he received, Misao goes on to join the Zyuohgers in stopping the aliens and develop his self-confidence as Zyuoh The World (ジュウオウザワールド, Jūō Za Wārudo). Following the Dethgaliens' defeat and Earth and Zyuland's merging, Misao assists Larry in teaching humanity and Zyumans about each other's backgrounds and begins dating a rhinoceros Zyuman named Lilian.

Unlike the primary Zyuohgers, Misao utilizes the Zyuoh The Light (ジュウオウザライト, Jūō Za Raito) device to transform into the "Champion of the World" (世界の王者, Sekai no Ōja), Zyuoh The World. While transformed, he wields the Zyuoh The Gun Rod (ジュウオウザガンロッド, Jūō Za Gan Roddo) sidearm, which can be reconfigured into varying forms. Moreover, as a result of the rhinoceros Zyuman's power, Misao's sense of touch was enhanced to the point where he can detect danger through his fingertips and feel others' heartbeats by holding their hands.

- Rhinos Form (ライノスフォーム, Rainosu Fōmu): Misao's black-colored default form accessed from the Zyuoh The Light's Rhinos (ライノス, Rainosu) setting that grants the use of the Great Wild Release (野生大解放, Yasei Dai Kaihō) ability to manifest a pair of rhinoceros horn-like shoulder pads, a crocodile tail-like right gauntlet, and a wolf claw-like left gauntlet at once, which allow him to perform the World The Crash (ワールドザクラッシュ, Wārudo Za Kurasshu) finisher. In this form, he primarily wields the Zyuoh The Gun Rod in its whip-like Fishing Mode (フィッシングモード, Fisshingu Mōdo).
- Wolf Form (ウルフフォーム, Urufu Fōmu): A silver-colored auxiliary form accessed from the Zyuoh The Light's Wolf (ウルフ, Urufu) setting that grants superhuman speed. In this form, Misao primarily wields the Zyuoh The Gun Rod in its rifle-like Gun Mode (ガンモード, Gan Mōdo), which allows him to perform the Zyuoh The Burst (ジュウオウザバースト, Jūō Za Bāsuto) finisher.
- Crocodile Form (クロコダイルフォーム, Kurokodairu Fōmu): A gold-colored auxiliary form accessed from the Zyuoh The Light's Crocodile (クロコダイル, Kurokodairu) setting that grants superhuman strength. In this form, Misao primarily wields the Zyuoh The Gun Rod in its spear-like Rod Mode (ロッドモード, Roddo Mōdo), which allows him to perform the Zyuoh The Finish (ジュウオウザフィニッシュ, Jūō Za Finisshu) finisher.

Misao Mondo is portrayed by Naoki Kunishima (國島 直希, Kunishima Naoki).

=== Zyuoh Cubes ===
The Zyuoh Cubes (ジュウオウキューブ, Jūō Kyūbu) are the Zyuohgers' numbered mecha that normally fit in the palm of a hand, but can grow to a giant size when summoned into battle where they can switch between Cube Mode (キューブモード, Kyūbu Mōdo) and Animal Mode (動物モード, Dōbutsu Mōdo).

- 0. Cube Condor (キューブコンドル, Kyūbu Kondoru): Zyuoh Condor's personal Zyuoh Cube that forms the head, torso, and arms of Condor Wild. It can also turn into either a condor or the Condor Saber (コンドルセイバー, Kondoru Seibā), the latter of which is used by Wild Tousai King to perform the Condor Zyuoh Infinity (コンドルジュウオウインフィニティ, Kondoru Jūō Infiniti) finisher.
- 1. Cube Eagle (キューブイーグル, Kyūbu Īguru): Zyuoh Eagle's personal Zyuoh Cube that forms the head, torso, and arms of Zyuoh King. It can also turn into an eagle capable of firing lasers from the turbine on its back and performing a flaming dive bomb attack.
- 2. Cube Shark (キューブシャーク, Kyūbu Shāku): Zyuoh Shark's personal Zyuoh Cube that forms the hips of Zyuoh King. It can also turn into a blue shark capable of flying, swimming, and performing bite attacks.
- 3. Cube Lion (キューブライオン, Kyūbu Raion): Zyuoh Lion's personal Zyuoh Cube that forms the legs of Zyuoh King. It can also turn into a lion capable of firing a lightning blast from its mouth and performing bite attacks.
- 4. Cube Elephant (キューブエレファント, Kyūbu Erefanto): Zyuoh Elephant's personal Zyuoh Cube that forms the legs of Zyuoh Wild and Condor Wild. It can also turn into an elephant capable of shooting an energy beam and producing mist from its trunk.
- 5. Cube Tiger (キューブタイガー, Kyūbu Taigā): Zyuoh Tiger's personal Zyuoh Cube that forms the hips of Zyuoh Wild and Condor Wild. It can also turn into a white tiger equipped with an extra pair of claws on its back capable of shooting boomerang-like energy blades at opponents.
- 6. Cube Gorilla (キューブゴリラ, Kyūbu Gorira): Zyuoh Gorilla's personal Zyuoh Cube that forms the head, torso, and arms of Zyuoh Wild. It can also turn into a gorilla possessing incredible strength and equipped with the right shoulder-mounted Big Wild Cannon (ビッグワイルドキャノン, Biggu Wairudo Kyanon).
- 7. Cube Crocodile (キューブクロコダイル, Kyūbu Kurokodairu): One of Zyuoh The World's secondary Zyuoh Cubes that forms the right arm of Tousai Zyuoh. It can also turn into a crocodile capable of swimming, firing an energy beam from its mouth, and performing bite attacks.
- 8. Cube Wolf (キューブウルフ, Kyūbu Urufu): One of Zyuoh The World's secondary Zyuoh Cubes that forms the head of Tousai Zyuoh. It can also turn into a wolf possessing incredible speed and agility, and is capable of firing a sonic beam while in its Cube Mode.
- 9. Cube Rhinos (キューブライノス, Kyūbu Rainosu): Zyuoh The World's personal Zyuoh Cube that forms the torso, legs, and left arm of Tousai Zyuoh. Unlike the other Zyuoh Cubes, it does not have a Cube Mode as it was modified by Ginis to resemble and function as a rhinoceros-themed carrier truck for Cubes Crocodile and Wolf.
- 10. Cube Whale (キューブホエール, Kyūbu Hoēru): Zyuoh Whale's personal Zyuoh Cube that can turn into a sperm whale capable of swimming, flying, and firing torpedoes. It can also assume a humanoid form called DodekaiOh (ドデカイオー, Dōdekaiō) via Animal Transformation (動物変形, Dōbutsu Henkei) where it wields the KaiOh Spear (カイオースピア, Kaiō Supia), which can be shrunk down for Yamato's use. Its finisher is the Dodekai Ocean Splash (ドデカイオーシャンスプラッシュ, Dodekai Ōshan Supurasshu).

==== Zyuoh Cube Weapons ====
The Zyuoh Cube Weapons (ジュウオウキューブウエポン, Jūō Kyūbu Uepon) are smaller support Zyuoh Cubes that possess a third Weapon Mode (ウエポンモード, Uepon Mōdo) for the Zyuohgers' giant robots to wield. Unlike the primary Zyuoh Cubes, the Zyuoh Cube Weapons are marked with an exclamation point.

- Cube Kirin (キューブキリン, Kyūbu Kirin; Cube Giraffe): An orange-colored Zyuoh Cube Weapon that can turn into either a giraffe or the Kirin Bazooka (キリンバズーカ, Kirin Bazūka), the latter of which is used by Zyuoh King to perform the Kirin Bazooka: Zyuoh Fire (キリンバズーカ・ジュウオウファイア, Kirin Bazūka Jūō Faia) finisher.
- Cube Mogura (キューブモグラ, Kyūbu Mogura; Cube Mole): A violet-colored Zyuoh Cube Weapon that can turn into either a mole or the Mogura Drill (モグラドリル, Mogura Doriru), the latter of which is used by Zyuoh Wild to perform the Mogura Drill: Zyuoh Break (モグラドリル・ジュウオウブレイク, Mogura Doriru Jūō Bureiku) finisher.
- Cube Kuma (キューブクマ, Kyūbu Kuma; Cube Bear): A brown-colored Zyuoh Cube Weapon that can turn into either a brown bear or the Kuma Axe (クマアックス, Kuma Akkusu), the latter of which is used by Wild Zyuoh King to perform the Kuma Axe: Zyuoh Impact (クマアックス・ジュウオウインパクト, Kuma Akkusu Jūō Inpakuto) finisher.
  - Cube Panda (キューブパンダ, Kyūbu Panda): A gold-colored evolution of Cube Kuma that can turn into either a panda or the Panda Axe (パンダックス, Panda Akkusu).
- Cube Koumori (キューブコウモリ, Kyūbu Kōmori; Cube Bat): A navy blue-colored Zyuoh Cube Weapon that can turn into either a bat or the Koumori Boomerang (コウモリブーメラン, Kōmori Būmeran), the latter of which is used by Tousai Zyuoh to perform the Koumori Boomerang: Zyuoh Cutter (コウモリブーメラン・ジュウオウカッター, Kōmori Būmeran Jūō Kattā) finisher.
- Cube Hyou (キューブヒョウ, Kyūbu Hyō; Cube Leopard): A yellow-colored Zyuoh Cube Weapon that can turn into either a leopard or the Hyou Hammer (ヒョウハンマー, Hyō Hanmā).
- Cube Shimauma (キューブシマウマ, Kyūbu Shimauma; Cube Zebra): A black/white-colored Zyuoh Cube Weapon that can turn into either a zebra or the Shimauma Launcher (シマウマランチャー, Shimauma Ranchā).
- Cube Kamonohashi (キューブカモノハシ, Kyūbu Kamonohashi; Cube Platypus): A cyan-colored Zyuoh Cube weapon that can turn into either a platypus or the Kamonohashi Laser (カモノハシレーザー, Kamonohashi Rēzā).
- Cube Fukurou (キューブフクロウ, Kyūbu Fukurō; Cube Owl): A green-colored Zyuoh Cube Weapon that can turn into either an owl or the Fukurou Cutter (フクロウカッター, Fukurou Kattā).

===== Cube Octopus =====
Cube Octopus (キューブオクトパス, Kyūbu Okutopasu) is a green-colored Big Zyuoh Cube Weapon (ビッグジュウオウキューブウエポン, Biggu Jūō Kyūbu Uepon) marked with a question mark that can either turn into an octopus or combine with Zyuoh King to form Zyuoh King Octopus (ジュウオウキングオクトパス, Jūō Kingu Okutopasu), which allows the giant robot to fly and perform the Octopus Zyuoh Bomber (オクトパス・ジュウオウボンバー, Okutopasu Jūō Bonbā) attack. Its finisher is the Octopus Zyuoh Slash (オクトパス・ジュウオウ斬り, Okutopasu Jūō Giri).

==== Animal Combinations ====
The Zyuohgers can assemble three Zyuoh Cubes into giant robots via Animal Combination (動物合体, Dōbutsu Gattai). Furthermore, they can add two or more Zyuoh Cubes via Cube Animal Combination (動物キューブ合体, Dōbutsu Kyūbu Gattai). They later gain the power to assemble a larger number of Zyuoh Cubes and their Zyuoh Cube Weapons into stronger giant robots via Great Animal Combination (動物大合体, Dōbutsu Dai Gattai).

- Zyuoh King (ジュウオウキング, Jūō Kingu): The Zyuohgers' first giant robot composed of Cube Eagle and two other Zyuoh Cubes in specific arrangements.
  - Zyuoh King (1-2-3): The primary arrangement composed of Cubes Eagle, Shark, and Lion that wields the King Sword (キングソード, Kingu Sōdo). Its finisher is the King Sword: Zyuoh Slash (キングソード・ジュウオウ斬り, Kingu Sōdo Jūō Giri).
  - Zyuoh King (1-5-4): The secondary arrangement composed of Cubes Eagle, Tiger, and Elephant that utilizes a martial arts-esque fighting style, allowing it to perform the Elephant Kick (エレファントキック, Erefanto Kikku) and Tiger Kick (タイガーキック, Taigā Kikku) attacks. Its finisher is the Zyuoh Megaton Kick (ジュウオウメガトンキック, Jūō Megaton Kikku).
  - Zyuoh King (1-2-3-4-5): An alternate arrangement composed of five main Zyuoh Cubes. This combination appears exclusively in the film Doubutsu Sentai Zyuohger the Movie: The Exciting Circus Panic.
  - Zyuoh King (1-2-4): An alternate arrangement composed of Cubes Eagle, Shark, and Elephant. This combination appears exclusively in the crossover film Doubutsu Sentai Zyuohger vs. Ninninger the Movie: Super Sentai's Message from the Future.
- Zyuoh Wild (ジュウオウワイルド, Jūō Wairudo): The Zyuohgers' second giant robot composed of Cube Gorilla and two other Zyuoh Cubes in specific arrangements that wields the Wild Cannon (ワイルドキャノン, Wairudo Kyanon) handgun, which allows it to perform the Wild Cannon Beam (ワイルドキャノンビーム, Wairudo Kyanon Bīmu) attack. Its finisher is the Wild Rocket Knuckle (ワイルドロケットナックル, Wairudo Roketto Nakkuru).
  - Zyuoh Wild (6-5-4): The primary arrangement composed of Cubes Gorilla, Tiger, and Elephant.
  - Zyuoh Wild (6-2-3): The secondary arrangement composed of Cubes Gorilla, Shark, and Lion.
  - Zyuoh Wild Special (ジュウオウワイルドスペシャル, Jūō Wairudo Supesharu): An alternate arrangement composed of Cubes Gorilla, Tiger, Lion, Elephant, Kirin, and Mogura.
  - Zyuoh Wild (6-5-3): An alternate arrangement composed of Cubes Gorilla, Tiger, and Lion. This combination appears exclusively in the crossover film Doubutsu Sentai Zyuohger vs. Ninninger the Movie: Super Sentai's Message from the Future.
- Wild Zyuoh King (ワイルドジュウオウキング, Wairudo Jūō Kingu): A combination of Zyuoh King, Zyuoh Wild, and Cubes Kirin and Mogura that wields the King Sword. Its finisher is the Zyuoh Dynamic Strike (ジュウオウダイナミックストライク, Jūō Dainamikku Sutoraiku).
- Tousai Zyuoh (トウサイジュウオー, Tōsai Jūō): Zyuoh The World's personal giant robot composed of Cubes Crocodile, Wolf, and Rhinos. Its finisher is the Tousai Triple The Beast (トウサイトリプルザビースト, Tōsai Toripuru Za Bīsuto).
- Wild Tousai King (ワイルドトウサイキング, Wairudo Tōsai Kingu): A combination of Zyuoh King, Zyuoh Wild, Tousai Zyuoh, and Cubes Kirin, Mogura, Kuma, and Koumori that is equipped with the right forearm-mounted Big King Sword (ビッグキングソード, Biggu Kingu Sōdo), which allows it to perform the Zyuoh Direct Straight (ジュウオウダイレクトストレート, Jūō Dairekuto Sutorēto) finisher, and the left forearm-mounted Big Wild Cannon, which allows it to perform the Zyuoh Direct Shot (ジュウオウダイレクトショット, Jūō Dairekuto Shotto) finisher. While fighting alongside the Gokaigers, the Zyuohgers are able to combine their power with that of their 39 Super Sentai predecessors to perform the Zyuoh Forty Anniversary (ジュウオウフォーティーアニバーサリー, Jūō Fōtī Anibāsarī) finisher.
  - Wild Tousai Shuriken King (ワイルドトウサイシュリケンキング, Wairudo Tōsai Shuriken Kingu): The Great Animal Shuriken Combination (動物手裏剣大合体, Dōbutsu Shuriken Dai Gattai) of Wild Tousai King and the Ninningers' Combination Nin Shuriken that can perform the Shuriken Shield (手裏剣シールド, Shuriken Shīrudo) attack. Its finisher is the Zyuoh Ninnin Super Sentai Burst (ジュウオウニンニンスーパー戦隊バースト, Jūō Ninnin Sūpā Sentai Bāsuto). This combination appears exclusively in the crossover film Doubutsu Sentai Zyuohger vs. Ninninger the Movie: Super Sentai's Message from the Future
- Wild Tousai Dodeka King (ワイルドトウサイドデカキング, Wairudo Tōsai Dodeka Kingu): The All Animal Combination (動物全合体, Dōbutsu Zen Gattai) of Zyuoh King, Zyuoh Wild, Tousai Zyuoh, and Cubes Kirin, Mogura, Kuma, Koumori, and Whale. Its finishers are the Zyuoh Dodeka Shot (ジュウオウドデカショット, Jūō Dodeka Shotto) and the Zyuoh Dodeka Dynamite Stream (ジュウオウドデカダイナマイトストリーム, Jūō Dodeka Dainamaito Sutorīmu). During their final battle against Ginis, the Zyuohgers infuse the energy of Wild Tousai Dodeka King with that of Earth's to perform the Zyuoh Dodeka Grand Final Finish (ジュウオウドデカグランドファイナルフィニッシュ, Jūō Dodeka Gurando Fainaru Finisshu) finisher.
- Condor Wild (コンドルワイルド, Kondoru Wairudo): A combination of Cubes Condor, Tiger, and Elephant. Its finisher is the Condor Rocket Knuckle (コンドルロケットナックル, Kondoru Roketto Nakkuru). This combination appears exclusively in the films Doubutsu Sentai Zyuohger the Movie: The Exciting Circus Panic! and Doubutsu Sentai Zyuohger Returns: Give Me Your Life! Earth Champion Tournament.

== Recurring characters ==
=== Bud ===
Bud (バド, Bado) is a mysterious eagle Zyuman that the Zyuohgers initially referred to as "Bird Man" (鳥男, Tori-otoko) who holds his kind in contempt for their racism towards humanity, which led to him leaving Zyuland, destroying the Link Cube, and stealing the sixth Champion's Proof to sever the connection between the two worlds. While in the human world, Bud was attacked by humans, but rescued by Yamato's father, Kageyuki. In return, Bud rescued Yamato himself and granted the boy some of his Zyuman power despite shortening his lifespan. Using the Champion's Proof to assume a human disguise, Bud later modifies it into a variant of the Zyuoh Changer called the Zyuoh Changer Final (ジュウオウチェンジャーファイナル, Jūō Chenjā Fainaru) so he can transform into the orange-colored Zyuoh Bird (ジュウオウバード, Jūō Bādo) to help the Zyuohgers in their fight against the Dethgaliens. Following the Dethgaliens' defeat, Earth and Zyuland being merged, and peaceful relations being established between the two worlds, Bud departs to travel abroad.

As the "Champion of the Heavens" (天空の王者, Tenkū no Ōja), Zyuoh Bird, Bud wields his own version of the Eagriser which allows him to perform the Glide Feather Slash (グライドフェザースラッシュ, Guraido Fezā Surasshu) finisher and his own version of the Riser Spinning Slash. Additionally, he possesses a similar Wild Release as Yamato's, though he can also use his without transforming into Zyuoh Bird. Due to his weakened Zyuman power however, Bud strains himself whenever he transforms.

Bud is portrayed by Kohei Murakami (村上 幸平, Murakami Kōhei).

=== Dethgaliens ===
The Space Outlaws Dethgalien (宇宙の無法者デスガリアン, Uchū no Muhōmono Desugarian) are a group of alien rogues who travel around the universe in a starship called the Sagittariark (サジタリアーク, Sajitariāku) to hunt life on other planets for sport as part of their Blood Game (ブラッドゲーム, Buraddo Gēmu), with the winner chosen by who ever amuses the owner the most. They choose Earth as the venue for their 100th Blood Game due to its apparent lack of defenses, only to encounter and eventually be disassembled by the Zyuohgers.

==== Ginis ====
Ginis (ジニス, Jinisu) is a conglomerate of countless Mebas, the owner of the Dethgaliens, and host of the Blood Games who normally resides within the Sagittariark as he is dependent on its power supply. After choosing Earth and losing one of his Team Leaders, Jagged, to the Zyuohgers, Ginis offers his remaining Leaders, Quval and Azald, a special prize for eliminating them. Following multiple failed attempts, Ginis grows bored until Bangray arrives on Earth to hunt Cube Whale. The former tasks Naria with using Gift Custom to compete with Bangray and collect data on Cube Whale, but the Zyuohgers destroy the machine. Despite this, Ginis has Naria save its data, which he later uses to absorb Earth's energy and evolve into Shin Ginis (シン・ジニス, Shin Jinisu) to thwart Quval's attempt on his life. When the Zyuohgers kill Quval and Azald, Ginis decides to end the Blood Game himself by using his cells and the Sagittariark to destroy Earth. While the Zyuohgers destroy the starship, Ginis survives to implant his cells directly into Earth and challenge them to stop him before he destroys the planet. During their fight, he reveals the Blood Games were a means to prove himself as a superior life form, though the Zyuohgers discover his secret. A livid Ginis kills Naria for being nearby when this occurred and enlarges, only to be destroyed by Wild Tousai Dodeka King.

In his original form, Ginis can spawn silver Meba Medals so his Players can summon Mebas to assist them and upgrade Meba Medals into gold Continue Medals so his Players can be revived and enlarged. After evolving into Shin Ginis, he gains a pair of wings capable of firing lasers, a pair of swords generated from his arms, and the ability to fire a beam from his palm capable of enlarging Players.

Ginis is voiced by Kazuhiko Inoue (井上 和彦, Inoue Kazuhiko).

===== Mebas =====
Mebas (メーバ, Mēba) are amoeba-like extensions of Ginis who are created from Meba Medals (メーバメダル, Mēba Medaru) to serve as the Dethgaliens' foot soldiers. They also pilot pyramid-like Triangular (トライアングラー, Toraiangurā) fighter crafts.

==== Naria ====
Naria (ナリア) is Ginis' smithsonite-themed secretary who is usually tasked with bringing Continue Medals (コンティニューメダル, Kontinyū Medaru) to fallen Team Leaders and Players in order to revive and enlarge them. While helping enact Ginis' endgame however, she enlarges herself to protect the Sagittariark, but the Zyuohgers defeat her and cause her to revert to her original size. When she learns her master is composed of countless Mebas, which he had kept secret, she accepts him for what he is and resolves to continue serving him. However, he takes her compassion as an unacceptable insult and kills her.

In battle, she wields the Nunchacrusher (ヌンチャクラッシャー, Nunchakurasshā) nunchaku, which can also be used as a gun.

Naria is voiced by Minako Kotobuki (寿 美菜子, Kotobuki Minako).

===== Gift =====
Gift (ギフト, Gifuto) is a powerful war machine that Ginis created, but rarely uses in his Blood Games to avoid making the proceedings too one-sided. It is capable of enlarging itself and possesses several weapons at its disposal, such as the Ablation Railguns (アブレーションレールガン, Aburēshon Rērugan), which can destroy entire planets. It is eventually destroyed by Wild Zyuoh King. Ginis later creates the upgraded Mass-Produced Gifts (量産型ギフト, Ryōsan-gata Gifuto) to protect the Sagittariark during his attempt to destroy Earth, though the Zyuohgers destroy them all.

- Gift Custom (ギフトカスタム, Gifuto Kasutamu) is an upgraded version of Ginis' original Gift war machine that is equipped with the chest-mounted Big Pile Launcher (ビッグパイルランチャー, Biggu Pairu Ranchā) and 12-Tube Missile Pod (12連ミサイルポッド, Jūni-ren Misairu Poddo). Instead of being automated, this model is piloted by Naria. It is destroyed by DodekaiOh, but Naria escapes before then, taking with her a record of battle data that Ginis later uses to evolve into Shin Ginis.

==== Azald ====
Azald (アザルド, Azarudo) is a hot-tempered Boleite-themed Team Leader who enjoys making his victims suffer physically and employs Players who utilize brute force. He was originally Azald Legacy (アザルド・レガシー, Azarudo Regashī), an ancient monster who referred to himself as the Cosmic God of Destruction (宇宙の破壊神, Uchū no Hakaishin) and attacked Earth in the past before he was driven off by Cetus. Following this, Azald was found by Ginis, who reconstructed the latter into his current form. Initially watching the 100th Blood Game from the sidelines, Azald personally battles the Zyuohgers after they free Ginis' Extra Player, Misao Mondo, from the Dethgaliens' control. After Bud uses the Whale Change Gun to wound him, Azald regains his memories and full power as Azald Legacy, breaks off from the Dethgaliens, and attempts to destroy Earth. However, the Zyuohgers discover his weakness and eventually destroy him permanently.

In battle, Azald wields the Azald Natta (アザルドナッター, Azarudo Nattā) great sword, possesses a durable cuboid body, and is functionally immortal so long as his core remains intact. As Azald Legacy, he can destroy his surroundings with simple gestures.

Azald is voiced by Joji Nakata (中田 譲治, Nakata Jōji).

==== Quval ====
Quval (クバル, Kubaru) is a cautious bismuth-themed Team Leader who enjoys making his victims suffer mentally and employs Players who rely on strategy and deception. He is the sole survivor of a world the Dethgaliens destroyed, having joined them under false pretenses to seek revenge. While battling the Zyuohgers and pursuing his goal, Quval slices off Bangray's hand and attaches it to himself to make use of the latter's mental powers before mounting an attempt on Ginis' life. When Ginis thwarts this however, Quval returns to him and tries to earn his forgiveness by personally killing the Zyuohgers. Despite receiving five Continue Medals to enlarge himself and significantly increase his power, Quval is destroyed by Wild Tousai Dodeka King.

In battle, Quval wields the Fasticker (フェイスティッカー, Feisutikkā), which has blaster and rapier modes, the Switchusha (スイッチュウシャー, Suitchūshā) injector, and the Voltaic Knuckle (ボルテックナックル, Borutekku Nakkuru) gauntlet.

Quval is voiced by Mitsuo Iwata (岩田 光央, Iwata Mitsuo).

==== Players ====
The Players (プレイヤー, Pureiyā) are the Dethgaliens' video game genre and game-themed participants who cause mayhem to attract Ginis' attention on their Leader's behalf and each possess a Medal Slot on their bodies, which allow them to be revived and enlarged via a Continue Medal.

===== Team Azald =====
- Halbergoi (ハルバゴイ, Harubagoi): A shooter game-themed Player who wields the Yarisugisspear (ヤリスギッスピア, Yarisugissupia) halberd, which he can enlarge and create duplicates of. He is defeated by the Zyuohgers, enlarged by Naria, and destroyed by Zyuoh King. Halbergoi is voiced by Tetsu Shiratori (白鳥 哲, Shiratori Tetsu).
- Bowguns (ボウガンス, Bōgansu): A high speed shooting-themed Player who ends almost every sentence with "-de guns" and wields the Gunsbow (ガンスボウ, Gansubō) crossbow. He is defeated by the Zyuohgers, enlarged by Naria, and destroyed by Zyuoh King via the Kirin Bazooka. Bowguns is voiced by Yohei Obayashi (大林 洋平, Ōbayashi Yōhei).
- Gaburio (ガブリオ): A Dot Eat-themed Player who possesses the Crisistomach (クライシストマック, Kuraishisutomakku) and enlarged jaws that allow him to eat anything he sees, such as buildings. He is defeated by the Zyuohgers, enlarged by Naria, and destroyed by Zyuoh King. Gaburio is voiced by Wataru Takagi (高木 渉, Takagi Wataru).
- Yabiker (ヤバイカー, Yabaikā): A racing game-themed Player who wields the Yoroshiku Rod (夜露死苦路道, Yoroshiku Roddo) morning star and the Muffrappa (マフラッパー, Mafurappā) bell, which is capable of enraging targets. He is defeated by the Zyuohgers, enlarged by Naria, and destroyed by Zyuoh King and Wild. Yabiker is voiced by Nobuyuki Hiyama (檜山 修之, Hiyama Nobuyuki).
- Noborizon (ノボリゾン): A climbing video game-themed Player who wields the Attack Pickels (アタックピッケル, Atakku Pikkeru) and the Suidrill (スイドリル, Suidoriru). He is defeated by the Zyuohgers, enlarged by Naria, and destroyed by Wild Zyuoh King via the Kuma Axe. Noborizon is voiced by Takayuki Nakatsukasa (中務 貴幸, Nakatsukasa Takayuki).
- Bowlingen (ボウリンゲン, Bōringen): A bowling-themed Player who dual wields the twin bowling pin-like Kakonbo (カコーンボウ, Kakōnbō) clubs and possesses the ability to manipulate living organisms like bowling pins. He is defeated by the Zyuohgers, enlarged by Naria, and destroyed by Tousai Zyuoh. Bowlingen is voiced by Subaru Kimura (木村 昴, Kimura Subaru).
- Prisonable (プリズナブル, Purizunaburu): An escape the room-themed Player who wields the Tetsugoshield (テツゴウシールド, Tetsugōshīrudo). He is defeated by Zyuoh Elephant and The World, enlarged by Naria, and destroyed by Tousai Zyuoh via the Koumori Boomerang. Prisonable is voiced by Hisao Egawa (江川 央生, Egawa Hisao).
- Cruiser (クルーザ, Kurūza): A wargame-themed Player who is equipped with the Uchimacluster (ウチマクラスター, Uchimakurasutā) turret on his right shoulder, which is capable of firing missiles. He is defeated by Zyuoh Shark, Lion, Elephant, and Tiger, enlarged by Naria, and destroyed by Wild Tousai King. Cruiser is voiced by Akio Suyama (陶山 章央, Suyama Akio).
- Sumotron (スモートロン, Sumōtoron): A sumo-themed Player who wears the Dethgalien Yokozuna Mawashi (デスガリアン横綱まわし, Desugarian Yokozuna Mawashi) and wields the Happyaku Nagayari (八百長槍). He is defeated by the Zyuohgers, enlarged by Naria, and destroyed by Wild Tousai King. Sumotron is voiced by Masuo Amada (天田 益男, Amada Masuo).
- Sambaba (サンババ): A music video game-themed Player. He is defeated by Zyuoh Whale, enlarged by Naria, and destroyed by Wild Tousai Dodeka King. Sambaba is voiced by Shintarō Asanuma (浅沼 晋太郎, Asanuma Shintarō).
- Saguil Brothers (サグイルブラザーズ, Saguiru Burazāzu): Twin jump rope-themed Players who wields Synchrope (シンクロープ, Shinkurōpu) jump ropes and Grooblade (グルーブレード, Gurūburēdo) daggers. They are defeated by Zyuoh Eagle and Bird, enlarged by Naria, and destroyed by Wild Tousai Dodeka King. The Saguil Brothers are voiced by Hidenobu Kiuchi (木内 秀信, Kiuchi Hidenobu) and Hiro Yūki (優希 比呂, Yūki Hiro).
- Killmench (キルメンチ): A fighting game-themed Player who possesses the Batchiregent (バッチリーゼント, Batchirīzento) head and wields the Choranbo (チョウランボウ, Chōranbō) bokken. He is defeated by Zyuoh Whale, enlarged by Naria, and destroyed by Zyuoh King Octopus. Killmench is voiced by Kenjiro Tsuda (津田 健次郎, Tsuda Kenjirō).
- Gakkarize (ガッカリゼ): A drawing video game-themed Player and the final Player to participate in the Blood Games who wields the Efudipper (エフディッパー, Efudippā) paintbrush, which doubles as a rapier. He is defeated by Zyuoh Shark, Lion, Elephant, and Tiger, enlarged by Naria, and destroyed by Wild Tousai Dodeka King. Gakkarize is voiced by Shinnosuke Tachibana (立花 慎之介, Tachibana Shinnosuke).

===== Team Quval =====
- Amigard (アミガルド): A fighting game-themed Player who wields the double-bladed Fightomahawk (ファイトマホーク, Faitomahōku) axe. He is defeated by the Zyuohgers, enlarged by Naria, and destroyed by Zyuoh King via the Kirin Bazooka. Amigard is voiced by Tetsuo Kanao (金尾 哲夫, Kanao Tetsuo).
- Hanayaida (ハナヤイダー, Hanayaidā): A caring game-themed Player who possesses the ability to produce sleeping pollen that causes endless dreams and wields the Josui Joro (ジョースイジョーロ, Jōsui Jōro) watering pot, which can create a Planter Protector (プランタープロテクター, Purantā Purotekutā) shield. He is defeated by the Zyuohgers, enlarged by Naria, and destroyed by Zyuoh Wild via the Mogura Drill. Hanayaida is voiced by Masami Iwasaki (岩崎 征実, Iwasaki Masami).
- Hattena (ハッテナー, Hattenā): A text sim-themed, hat-like Player who possesses the seemingly indestructible Dummy Bio Body (ダミーバイオボディ, Damī Baio Bodi), who wields the Queschopper (クエスチョッパー, Kuesuchoppā) rod. He is defeated by Zyuoh Elephant, enlarged by Naria, and destroyed by Wild Zyuoh King. Hattena is voiced by Nobuo Tobita (飛田 展男, Tobita Nobuo).
- Trumpus (トランパス, Toranpasu): A card game-themed Player who wields the bladed Trusensu (トラセンス, Torasensu) war fan, Jackard (ジャッカード, Jakkādo) cards, and Oshimai Boxes (オ4マイボックス, Oshimai Bokkusu). He is defeated by Zyuoh Shark, Lion, Elephant, and Tiger, enlarged by Naria, and destroyed by Wild Zyuoh King via the Kuma Axe. Trumpus is voiced by Yasunori Masutani (増谷 康紀, Masutani Yasunori).
- Illusion (イルジオン, Irujion): A bomb action-themed Player who wields the Hazero Stick (ハゼロステッキ, Hazero Sutekki), which can convert items into explosives. He is defeated by Zyuoh Eagle and The World, enlarged by Naria, and destroyed by Wild Tousai King. Illusion is voiced by Kappei Yamaguchi (山口 勝平, Yamaguchi Kappei).
- Jashinger (ジャシンガー, Jashingā): A photography simulation game-themed Player who wields the Gekishutter (ゲキシャッター, Gekishattā) camera on his right shoulder and wields the Sankyaclaw (サンキャクロー, Sankyakurō) man catcher. He is defeated by the Zyuohgers, enlarged by Naria, and destroyed by Wild Tousai King. Jashinger is voiced by Yasuhiro Takato (高戸 靖広, Takato Yasuhiro).
- Omoteuria (オモテウリャー, Omoteuryā): A morality game-themed Player who possesses a two-sided body called Two Faces (ツーフェイス, Tsū Feisu). He is defeated by Zyuoh Whale, enlarged by Naria, and destroyed by Wild Tousai King and DodekaiOh. Omoteuria is voiced by Satoshi Mikami (三上 哲, Mikami Satoshi).
- Chefdon (シェフードン, Shefūdon): A cooking video game-themed Player who wields the Gourmace (グルメイス, Gurumeisu). He is defeated by Zyuoh Whale, enlarged by Naria, and destroyed by Wild Tousai Dodeka King. Chefdon is voiced by Nobuaki Fukuda (福田 信昭, Fukuda Nobuaki).

===== Team Jagged =====
- Jagged (ジャグド, Jagudo): The stibnite-themed Team Leader who is equipped with the left arm-mounted Stiblaster Cannon (スティブラスターカノン, Sutiburasutā Kanon) and the first of the Dethgaliens to attack Earth and confront the Zyuohgers, only to be defeated by Yamato, enlarged by Naria, and killed by Zyuoh King. Jagged is voiced by Eiji Takemoto (竹本 英史, Takemoto Eiji).
- Dorobozu (ドロボーズ, Dorobōzu): A collecting game-themed Player who wears the Karakusa Stealsuit (唐草ステルスーツ, Karakusa Suterusūtsu), which renders him invisible, and possesses the Karakusa Catcher (唐草キャッチャー, Karakusa Kyatchā) hands. He is defeated by the Zyuohgers, enlarged by Naria, and destroyed by Wild Zyuoh King via the Kuma Axe. Dorobozu is voiced by Masami Kikuchi (菊池 正美, Kikuchi Masami).
- Hantajii (ハンタジイ): A sniper video game-themed Player who wields the G-15 Rifle (G（ジイ）-15ライフル, Jii Jūgo Raifuru), which is capable of turning targets into dolls, and the Higemerang (ヒゲメラン, Higemeran) boomerangs. He is defeated by the Zyuohgers, enlarged by Naria, and destroyed by Wild Zyuoh King via the Kuma Axe. Hantajii is voiced by Hiroshi Naka (中 博史, Naka Hiroshi).

==== Other members ====
- Mantle (マントール, Mantōru): A matador-themed Player who assists Naria, wears the Freta Mantle (フレータマント, Furēta Manto), which allows him to teleport, and wields the Despada (デスパーダ, Desupāda) saber. He is defeated by the Zyuohgers, enlarged by Naria, and destroyed by Wild Zyuoh King via the Kuma Axe. Mantle is voiced by Satoshi Hino (日野 聡, Hino Satoshi).

=== Mario Mori ===
Mario Mori (森 真理夫, Mori Mario) is Yamato Kazakiri's maternal uncle, the inspiration behind the latter becoming a zoologist, and the younger brother of Yamato's late mother Wakako who owns a workshop where he makes animal sculptures. Despite agreeing to house Yamato's Zyuman teammates, Mori remains unaware of his guests' true nature for most of the series until he learns their secret during one of their battles.

Mario Mori is portrayed by Susumu Terajima (寺島 進, Terajima Susumu).

=== Larry ===
Larry (ラリー, Rarī) is a gorilla Zyuman and anthropologist and an old friend of Bud's who became stranded in the human world after Bud severed the connection between Earth and Zyuland. Initially enjoying studying humans, Larry soon began to loathe them and shunned having to make contact with them until he meets Yamato Kazakiri, whose lack of fear for him renews Larry's admiration for humans. After Yamato is grievously wounded while fighting the Dethgaliens, Larry gives the former a significant portion of his Zyuman energy to save him, shortening his own lifespan in the process. Following the Dethgaliens' defeat and Earth and Zyuland being merged, Larry joins Misao Mondo in teaching humans and Zyumans each others' cultures.

Larry is voiced by Unshō Ishizuka (石塚 運昇, Ishizuka Unshō).

=== "Rhino Man", "Crocodile Man", and "Wolf Man" ===
The "Rhino Man" (犀男, Sai-otoko), the "Crocodile Man" (鰐男, Wani-otoko), and the "Wolf Man" (狼男, Ōkami-otoko) are three unnamed Zyumans who were captured and killed by the Dethgaliens while infusing their energy into Misao Mondo in order to turn him into their Extra Player, The World. After the Zyuohgers free Misao of the Dethgaliens' control, the three Zyumans haunt him before encouraging him to join the Zyuohgers in fighting the Dethgaliens, with the wise "Rhino Man" serving as an advisor to Misao and an intermediary for the "Crocodile Man" and "Wolf Man", who behave like a manzai duo. Following the Dethgaliens' defeat and Earth and Zyuland being merged, the three Zyumans disappear.

The "Rhino Man", "Crocodile Man", and "Wolf Man" are voiced by Volcano Ōta (ボルケーノ太田, Borukēno Ōta), Mitsuaki Kanuka (かぬか 光明, Kanuka Mitsuaki), and Hidenori Takahashi (高橋 英則, Takahashi Hidenori) respectively.

=== Bangray ===
Bangray (バングレイ, Bangurei) is a MegaBeast Hunter (巨獣ハンター, Kyojū Hantā) who travels the universe to hunt giant animals for fun. Upon arriving on Earth to seek out his 100th prey, Cube Whale, he battles the Zyuohgers and the Dethgaliens before briefly joining the latter. In the process, Bangray forms rivalries with Zyuohger leader Yamato Kazakiri, who is able to resist the hunter's mental powers, and Quval after discovering the latter's true reason for being with the Dethgaliens. Using Quval's memories, Bangray extorts his help in catching Cube Whale in exchange for an alliance to overthrow Quval's leader, Ginis. When both of their plots fail however, Quval betrays Bangray by slicing his forearm off and leaving him with a Continue Medal, which Bangray eats to enlarge himself before he is destroyed by Wild Tousai Dodeka King.

In battle, Bangray wields the anchor-like Bariblade (バリブレイド, Baribureido), which he later fuses with his right arm following Quval's betrayal. Additionally, he possesses a hunting ship called the Yabangreat (ヤバングレイト号, Yabangureito-gō) and the ability to read others' memories by touching their heads and producing constructs of individuals, living or dead, connected to them.

Bangray is voiced by Nobutoshi Canna (神奈 延年, Kanna Nobutoshi).

=== Kageyuki Kazakiri ===
Kageyuki Kazakiri (風切 景幸, Kazakiri Kageyuki) is Yamato's father and a doctor who hardly spent time with his family, which Yamato resented him for. Fifteen years prior to the series, Kageyuki encountered an injured Bud while traveling to his dying wife, Wakako. Bearing no fear of the Zyuman and believing that all lives support each other, Kageyuki healed Bud, who repaid him by taking care of Yamato. However, this led to Kageyuki arriving to the hospital after Wakako died and Yamato's resentment towards him worsening. Despite this, Kageyuki bears no ill will towards his son, realizing it was the price of his actions.

Kageyuki Kazakiri is portrayed by Tomiyuki Kunihiro (国広 富之, Kunihiro Tomiyuki).

== Guest characters ==
- Daisuke Hiramatsu (平松 大輔, Hiramatsu Daisuke): An aspiring composer and guitarist who Leo befriended. Daisuke Hiramatsu is portrayed by Kenshiro Iwai (岩井 拳士朗, Iwai Kenshirō).
- Siomaneking (シオマネキング, Shiomanekingu): A revived fiddler crab monster from the terrorist organization Shocker who attracts the attention of Yamato, Sela and Leo, who initially mistake him for a Dethgalien before joining forces with Takeru Tenkūji to defeat him. After the Dethgaliens enlarge him, Siomaneking is destroyed by Zyuoh Wild. Siomaneking is voiced by Tomokazu Seki (関 智一, Seki Tomokazu).
- Takeru Tenkūji (天空寺 タケル, Tenkūji Takeru): The current heir to the Daitenkū-ji Buddhist temple and a ghost capable of transforming into Kamen Rider Ghost (仮面ライダーゴースト, Kamen Raidā Gōsuto). He encounters the Zyuohgers while fighting Siomaneking. Takeru Tenkūji is portrayed by Shun Nishime (西銘 駿, Nishime Shun), who reprises the role from Kamen Rider Ghost.
- Wakako Kazakiri (née Mori) (風切 (森) 和歌子, Kazakiri (Mori) Wakako): Yamato Kazakiri's mother, Kageyuki Kazakiri's wife, and Mario Mori's older sister. Wakako Kazakiri is portrayed by Eriko Moriwaki (森脇 英理子, Moriwaki Eriko).
- Cetus (ケタス, Ketasu): A blue whale Zyuman from ancient times who was the founder and first king of Zyuland. In his youth, when the Zyuman race lived on Earth, Cetus fought Azald Legacy by himself to protect his fellow Zyumans. In response to this, the planet gave him the Whale Change Gun, which he used to transform into the first Zyuohger, Zyuoh Whale and drive the monster back into space. Afterwards, Cetus sealed the Whale Change Gun inside the Great Champion's Proof and hid it within the Link Cube along with a recorded message containing his story for future generations of Zyuman to find. In the present, Captain Marvelous and the Zyuohgers discover the Great Champion's Proof, which eventually leads to Yamato acquiring the Whale Change Gun and becoming the new Zyuoh Whale. Cetus is voiced by Chō (チョー), who also voices the Zyuohgers' equipment and serves as the series' narrator.
- Gokudos Gill (ゴクドス・ギル, Gokudosu Giru): A giant kraken-themed monster with the combined essence of all the Zangyack emperors' spirits that defeated the Gokaigers on the Zangyack homeworld before the events of Tokumei Sentai Go-Busters vs. Kaizoku Sentai Gokaiger: The Movie. Bangray makes a duplicate of Gokudos Gill after reading Gai Ikari's memory, but it is defeated by Wild Tousai King via the power of the Gokaigers' Ranger Keys.

=== Returning characters ===
- Kaizoku Sentai Gokaiger (海賊戦隊ゴーカイジャー, Kaizoku Sentai Gōkaijā): A group of space pirates and the 35th Super Sentai team who come to Earth to claim the Great Champion's Proof (大王者の資格, Dai Ōja no Shikaku), fighting the Zyuohgers and Bangray for possession of it before joining forces with the former to fight the latter.
  - Captain Marvelous (キャプテン・マーベラス, Kyaputen Māberasu): The leader of the Gokaigers who can transform into Gokai Red (ゴーカイレッド, Gōkai Reddo). Ryota Ozawa (小澤 亮太, Ozawa Ryōta) reprises his role from Kaizoku Sentai Gokaiger.
  - Joe Gibken (ジョー・ギブケン, Jō Gibuken): The second-in-command of the Gokaigers who can transform into Gokai Blue (ゴーカイブルー, Gōkai Burū). Yuki Yamada (山田 裕貴, Yamada Yūki) reprises his role from Kaizoku Sentai Gokaiger.
  - Luka Millfy (ルカ・ミルフィ, Ruka Mirufi): A member of the Gokaigers who can transform into Gokai Yellow (ゴーカイイエロー, Gōkai Ierō). M·A·O reprises her role from Kaizoku Sentai Gokaiger.
  - Don Dogoier (ドン･ドッゴイヤー, Don Doggoiyā): A member of the Gokaigers, also known as Doc (ハカセ, Hakase), who can transform into Gokai Green (ゴーカイグリーン, Gōkai Gurīn). Kazuki Shimizu (清水 一希, Shimizu Kazuki) reprises his role from Kaizoku Sentai Gokaiger.
  - Ahim de Famille (アイム・ド・ファミーユ, Aimu do Famīyu): A member of the Gokaigers who can transform into Gokai Pink (ゴーカイピンク, Gōkai Pinku). Yui Koike (小池 唯, Koike Yui) reprises her role from Kaizoku Sentai Gokaiger.
  - Gai Ikari (伊狩 鎧, Ikari Gai): A member of the Gokaigers who can transform into Gokai Silver (ゴーカイシルバー, Gōkai Shirubā). Junya Ikeda (池田 純矢, Ikeda Jun'ya) reprises his role from Kaizoku Sentai Gokaiger.

== Spin-off characters ==
- Domidol (ドミドル, Domidoru): An alien ringmaster and the owner of the Space Circus (宇宙サーカス団, Uchū Sākasu-dan) who wields the Cirque du Whip (シルクドウィップ, Shiruku Do Wippu), which allows him to control any animal, and appears exclusively in the film Doubutsu Sentai Zyuohger the Movie: The Exciting Circus Panic!. Seeking to recreate the universe into a circus by destroying planets he deems unnecessary, he comes to Earth and steals a large number of Meba Medals from the Dethgaliens. Following this, he creates a Zyuman circus to gather energy from children's sadness so he can destroy Earth, only to be foiled by the Zyuohgers. He combines with his starship, the Flying Tent (フライングテント号, Furaingu Tento-gō), to transform into his giant Perfect Form (完全態, Kanzentai), but is killed by Wild Tousai King via the Condor Saber. Domidol is portrayed by Takashi Yoshimura (吉村 崇, Yoshimura Takashi) of the owarai duo Heisei Nobushi Kobushi.
- Perle (ペルル, Peruru): A young, orphaned condor Zyuman born on Earth who became a member of a traveling Zyuman circus and appears exclusively in the films Doubutsu Sentai Zyuohger the Movie: The Exciting Circus Panic! and Doubutsu Sentai Zyuohger Returns: Give Me Your Life! Earth Champion Tournament. He possesses the ability to see visions via Cube Condor. Perle is voiced by Ririne Sasano (笹野 鈴々音, Sasano Ririne).
- Gillmarda (ギルマーダ, Girumāda): A plant-like alien hitman known for eliminating several warriors of justice across the universe who wields the Hana Beam Gun (ハナビームガン, Hana Bīmu Gan) rifle, possesses the ability to spread Jamming Pollen (ジャミング花粉, Jamingu Kafun), and create Usotsuke Masks (ウソツケマスク, Usotsuke Masuku) to make wearers angry and Dark Servants (闇の使い, Yami no Tsukai), and appears exclusively in the crossover film Doubutsu Sentai Zyuohger vs. Ninninger the Movie: Super Sentai's Message from the Future. After Naria hires him to eliminate the Zyuohgers, Gillmarda disguises himself as an alien named Runrun (ルンルン) to deceive the Ninningers into doing the job for him and have them kill each other in the process. However, a descendant of the Ninningers travels back in time to avert their deaths and convince the two Sentai teams to join forces and defeat him. Gillmarda enlarges, but is killed by Wild Tousai Shuriken King. Gillmarda is voiced by Nozomu Sasaki (佐々木 望, Sasaki Nozomu), while Runrun is voiced by Haruka Fukuhara (福原 遥, Fukuhara Haruka).
- Pocane Daniro (ポカネ・ダニーロ, Pokane Danīro): A casino game-themed space mafia leader and a former Dethgalien Player who wields the Martin Gazer (マーチンゲイザー, Māchin Geizā) sword and appears exclusively in the film Doubutsu Sentai Zyuohger Returns: Give Me Your Life! Earth Champion Tournament. After creating clones of Naria and the three Team Leaders to serve him, Daniro hosts a martial arts tournament called the Earth Champion Tournament ostensibly to find the planet's champion while secretly using the tournament and his ability to turn his victims into gems to fuel gambling at his illegal casino. After the Zyuohgers discover his true intentions, they foil his plans and defeat him. Daniro enlarges, but is killed by Wild Tousai King via the Condor Saber. Pocane Daniro is portrayed by Hayashiya Taihei (林家 たい平).
- Lilian (リリアン, Ririan): A rhinoceros Zyuman who appears exclusively in the film Doubutsu Sentai Zyuohger Returns: Give Me Your Life! Earth Champion Tournament. After fighting Misao Mondo during the titular tournament, they enter a relationship. Lillian is voiced by Rie Kugimiya (釘宮 理恵, Kugimiya Rie)
