= Doubutsu Sentai Zyuohger the Movie: The Exciting Circus Panic! =

- Theatrical poster

Japanese name
- Kanji: 劇場版 動物戦隊ジュウオウジャー ドキドキ サーカス パニック！
Transcriptions
- Revised Hepburn: Gekijōban Dōbutsu Sentai Jūōjā Dokidoki Sākasu Panikku!
- Directed by: Takayuki Shibasaki
- Written by: Junko Kōmura
- Based on: Doubutsu Sentai Zyuohger by Junko Kōmura
- Produced by: Saburo Yatsude; Toei
- Starring: Masaki Nakao; Miki Yanagi; Shohei Nanba; Tsurugi Watanabe; Haruka Tateishi; Naoki Kunishima
- Cinematography: Fumio Matsumura
- Edited by: Kazuko Yanagisawa
- Music by: Koichiro Kameyama
- Production company: Toei Films
- Release date: August 6, 2016 (Japan)
- Running time: 28 minutes
- Country: Japan
- Language: Japanese

Doubutsu Sentai Zyuohger the Movie: The Heart Pounding Circus Panic! (劇場版 動物戦隊ジュウオウジャー ドキドキ サーカス パニック！, Gekijōban Dōbutsu Sentai Jūōjā Dokidoki Sākasu Panikku!) is a Japanese film serving as the theatrical adaptation of the 2016 Super Sentai television series Doubutsu Sentai Zyuohger. It was released on August 6, 2016, as a double-billing with Kamen Rider Ghost: The 100 Eyecons and Ghost's Fated Moment.

== Plot ==
The movie begins with the Zyuohgers trying to stop Cube Condor via Zyuoh King 1-2-3-4-5. However, the formation broke, causing Cube Condor to hijack Cube Elephant and Cube Tiger to form Condor Wild, while its pilot Domidol knocked down Zyuoh Elephant and Zyuoh Tiger. Zyuoh King was defeated, causing Zyuoh Eagle/Yamato to be separated while the other Zyuohgers were captured by Domidol.

Misao finds an unconscious Yamato while he was fishing, with the latter proceeding to tell what happened earlier: after discovering that several Zyuman worked for a circus, Yamato brings the Zyuohgers to the circus but the show was interrupted by their ringleader Domidol, who kidnapped the children spectators in his circus tent spaceship to destroy Earth in hopes of creating a giant space trapeze. While delaying the Zyuohgers with Mebas stolen from the Deathgaliens, Domidol approached Perle, one of his performers and steals Cube Condor, enslaving it as his own personal mecha.

While the Deathgaliens watch Domidol's atrocities from above, Naria suggested to face him due to his theft of their assets but Ginis let him pass, wanting to observe his actions after taking interest on the space ringleader. Zyuoh Eagle tries to break into the spaceship, but gets pursued by the Mebas and gunned down by the turrets. In need of more energies, Domidol enters the prison room and tortures Perle while he restrains the captured Zyuohgers in front of the children. Yamato finally breaks in and rescues his teammates long enough to reclaim their Zyuoh Changers and transform. After the rest of the team dragged Domidol out, Zyuoh The World fished the entire spaceship to rescue the children and reunite them with their parents. With no options, Domidol combines with his spaceship into a giant monster and faced against Wild Tousai King. Perle send the Cube Condor by transforming the entire area into the Zyuland illusion, empowering Wild Tousai King with enough energy to counterattack and finish the ringleader with the Condor Zyuoh Infinity attack. The Zyuohgers sent their farewell to Domidol's former performers and hope to meet again in Zyuland.

== Cast ==
- Yamato Kazakiri (風切 大和, Kazakiri Yamato): Masaki Nakao (中尾 暢樹, Nakao Masaki)
- Sela (セラ, Sera): Miki Yanagi (柳 美稀, Yanagi Miki)
- Leo (レオ, Reo): Shohei Nanba (南羽 翔平, Nanba Shōhei)
- Tusk (タスク, Tasuku): Tsurugi Watanabe (渡邉 剣, Watanabe Tsurugi)
- Amu (アム): Haruka Tateishi (立石 晴香, Tateishi Haruka)
- Misao Mondo (門藤 操, Mondō Misao): Naoki Kunishima (國島 直希, Kunishima Naoki)
- Mario Mori (森 真理夫, Mori Mario): Susumu Terajima (寺島 進, Terajima Susumu)
- Domidol (ドミドル, Domidoru): Takashi Yoshimura (吉村 崇, Yoshimura Takashi; of Heisei Nobushi Kobushi)
- Ginis (ジニス, Jinisu; Voice): Kazuhiko Inoue (井上 和彦, Inoue Kazuhiko)
- Naria (ナリア; Voice): Minako Kotobuki (寿 美菜子, Kotobuki Minako)
- Perle (ペルル, Peruru; Voice): Ririne Sasano (笹野 鈴々音, Sasano Ririne)
- Narration, Zyuohger Equipment Voice: Chō (チョー)
