= List of Doubutsu Sentai Zyuohger episodes =

Doubutsu Sentai Zyuohger is a 2016 Japanese television series, and is the 40th entry of the long-running Super Sentai series produced by Toei Company. The series follows the battles of the Zyuohgers, a team composed of two humans and five members of the anthropomorphic animal race known as Zyumans who protect the Earth from the evil invading alien outlaws known as Dethgalien who choose the planet as their newest hunting ground.

== Episodes ==
No.	Title	Written by	Original release date
1	"The Exciting Animal Land"; Transliteration: "Dokidoki Dōbutsu Rando" (Japanese: どきどき動物ランド)	Junko Kōmura	February 14, 2016
A young zoologist named Yamato Kazakiri is transported to Zyuland, a mysterious land inhabited by humans with animal-like features. When he returns to Earth accompanied by four Zyumans, Sela, Leo, Tusk and Amu, the planet is under attack by the Dethgaliens, who chose it as the venue for their 100th Blood Game, and with the power of the Champion's Proofs, artifacts that serve as the link between both realms, they transform for the first time in the Zyuohgers to repel the enemy attack.
2	"Don't Underestimate This Planet"; Transliteration: "Kono Hoshi o Nameru na yo" (Japanese: この星をなめるなよ)	Junko Kōmura	February 21, 2016
With his new friends trapped in the human world, Yamato offers them safe haven in the house of his uncle, Mario Mori, but Tusk is distrustful of his intentions. Just when Yamato tries to convince him, the Dethgaliens attack once again.
3	"I Want to Go Home but We Can't Go Home"; Transliteration: "Kaeritai kedo Kaerenai" (Japanese: 帰りたいけど帰れない)	Junko Kōmura	February 28, 2016
The Zyumans cannot return to Zyuland until they find the missing sixth Champion's Proof. Amu thinks she has found it and takes Yamato along with her, but she seems more interested in experiencing human culture. Their plans are waylayed when the Dethgalien Player Bowguns attacks various cars and trucks, so the Zyuohgers face off, but find that his attacks are too fast to be seen, until Yamato seems to gain a new power.
4	"Roar in the Ring"; Transliteration: "Ringu ni Hoero" (Japanese: リングに吼えろ)	Junko Kōmura	March 6, 2016
Sela and Leo are kidnapped by the Dethgalien Player Amigarudo to be in his "Battle Show" where two people enter, and only one can leave, and he chooses best friends because it entertains him. As they fight, Leo holds back as Sela is a woman, which upsets her, and reminds her of the last time they fought in a martial arts tournament in Zyuland.
5	"Champion of the Jungle"; Transliteration: "Janguru no Ōja" (Japanese: ジャングルの王者)	Junko Kōmura	March 13, 2016
While chasing down the Dethgalien Player Gaburio, Yamato and the others find a gorilla Zyuman named Larry who has been studying humans for several years. Elsewhere, Azald lands on Earth to make Gaburio more powerful.
6	"A Wild Present"; Transliteration: "Wairudo na Purezento" (Japanese: ワイルドなプレゼント)	Junko Kōmura	March 20, 2016
With Yamato using Larry's Zyuman power, Larry begins to age rapidly, threatening his life. Elsewhere, Azald discovers Gaburio is still alive, but has gone missing. The Zyuohgers track him down again, but find someone looking entirely different.
7	"Go-Go-Go Ghost Appears"; Transliteration: "Gogogo Gōsuto ga Deta" (Japanese: ゴゴゴゴーストが出た)	Naruhisa Arakawa	March 27, 2016
Part 1 of the "Spring Break Combined Hero Festival". Quval appears and transforms Amu into one of his servants. While Tusk looks for a way to bring her back, the other Zyuohgers face a bizarre creature and are assisted by a mysterious, ghostly hero.
8	"Savanna's Melody"; Transliteration: "Sabanna no Merodī" (Japanese: サバンナのメロディー)	Junko Kōmura	April 3, 2016
The Dethgalien Player Yabiker attacks with the maddening sound of his horn, posing himself as a great challenge to the Zyuohgers, while Leo befriends a young musician after hearing one of his songs.
9	"The Endless Day"; Transliteration: "Owaranai Ichinichi" (Japanese: 終わらない一日)	Naruhisa Arakawa	April 10, 2016
The Zyuohgers keep defeating the same enemy again and again, unaware that they are under the effect of the sleeping pollen of the Dethgalien Player Hanayaida. Upon awakening, the heroes have little time to stop Hanayaida's plant from destroying the world, until a new ally awakens to help them.
10	"The Most Dangerous Game"; Transliteration: "Mottmo Kiken na Gēmu" (Japanese: 最も危険なゲーム)	Junko Kōmura	April 17, 2016
Ginis, the leader of the Dethgaliens, envelops a large portion of the city into a barrier that disintegrates everything it touches, and the Zyuohgers run against time to find the switch that turns it down as it shrinks little by little, threatening everyone trapped inside, including themselves.
11	"Animal Assembly"; Transliteration: "Dōbutsu Daishūgō" (Japanese: 動物大集合)	Junko Kōmura	April 24, 2016
Despite escaping from the barrier, the Zyuohgers are easily defeated by Gift, the all-powerful destruction machine designed by Ginis. As Gift recharges to resume its attack, Sela and the other Zyumans confront the same "Bird Man" who once rescued Yamato and discover that the sixth Champion's Proof is in his possession. But when they realize that Yamato's true intentions were to send them home and confront Gift alone, the other Zyuohgers decide to return and help him instead, combining all their Zyuoh Cubes into a new, mighty robot.
12	"The Short-Nosed Elephant"; Transliteration: "Hana no Mijikai Zō" (Japanese: はなのみじかいゾウ)	Jin Tanaka	May 1, 2016
After having a disastrous encounter with Genkuro Oiwa, a bookshop owner, Tusk is obliged to work for him during his recovery, while the other Zyuohgers are busy facing the Dethgalien Player Hattena who appears with a plan to destroy the culture of the Earth.
13	"The Summit Witness"; Transliteration: "Sanchō no Mokugekisha" (Japanese: 山頂の目撃者)	Junko Kōmura	May 8, 2016
The Zyuohgers climb Mount Onoiwa along Yuri Igarashi, a young hiker who claims that she had seen the Bird Man they are looking for there. Along the way, Leo, who became infatuated with Yuri, attempts to please her with no success, as she seems more interested in Yamato. However, Yuri and the Zyuohgers are unaware that the Dethgaliens are also lying at the mountain for their own schemes.
14	"The Foolish Lying Thief"; Transliteration: "Usotsuki Dorobō Obaka-kei" (Japanese: ウソつきドロボーおバカ系)	Naruhisa Arakawa	May 15, 2016
Amu befriends Kazuhiro Fuwa and his younger sister Marin, two siblings who are dealing with harsh times as Fuwa is working hard to make money for a surgery Marin needs in order to treat herself. However, upon knowing that he knows one of the Zyuohgers, the Dethgalien Player Dorobozu decides to exploit Fuwa's desperate need for money in order to lay a trap for Amu and the others.
15	"The Terrifying Sniper"; Transliteration: "Senritsu no Sunaipā" (Japanese: 戦慄のスナイパー)	Naruhisa Arakawa	May 22, 2016
The Dethgalien Player Hantajii shoots people left and right, transforming them into dolls with his sniper rifle and taking even the Zyuohgers by surprise. When only Leo and Tusk remain to face the enemy, they must find a way to outsmart the Dethgalien and save their friends.
16	"Find Zyumans"; Transliteration: "Jūman o Sagase" (Japanese: ジューマンをさがせ)	Jin Tanaka	May 29, 2016
Ginis' secretary Naria appears and starts looking for Zyumans by her master's orders, assisted by the Player Mantor, and when Yamato learns that his uncle Mario was kidnapped upon being mistaken by a Zyuman as well, he comes up with a risky plan to rescue him.
17	"The Extra Player's Intrusion"; Transliteration: "Ekusutora Pureiyā, Rannyū" (Japanese: エクストラプレイヤー、乱入)	Junko Kōmura	June 5, 2016
The Dethgalien Player Trumpas uses his cards to torment his victims and the Zyuohgers alike. Sela watches for a child who got lost from her father and manages to reunite them safely while bypassing the enemy's trick, but just when Trumpas is about to get his just deserts, the Zyuohgers are surprised with the arrival of "The World", a new and powerful enemy whose appearance and abilities are too familiar.
18	"Etched Terror"; Transliteration: "Kizamareta Kyōfu" (Japanese: きざまれた恐怖)	Junko Kōmura	June 12, 2016
Trumpas reappears with a Blood Game even more sinister, but to stop him, the Zyuohgers must pass by The World, who easily defeated them in their last encounter, and proves himself a threat even more dangerous when he unveils his own set of Zyuoh Cubes.
19	"Who to Believe in" Transliteration: "Shinjiru no wa Dare" (Japanese: 信じるのは誰)	Junko Kōmura	June 26, 2016
Yamato discovers that The World is not working for the Dethgaliens out of his own will, but is under their control instead. The Zyuohgers then confront The World one more time, looking for a way to break him free.
20	"Champion of the World"; Transliteration: "Sekai no Ōja" (Japanese: 世界の王者)	Junko Kōmura	July 3, 2016
Misao Mondo was released from the Dethgaliens' control, but he regrets all he had done as The World nonetheless and declines the Zyuohgers' offer to become their ally, until Yamato's companions are captured by Azald and Quval, who demand him to hand over Misao to them.
21	"Prison Break"; Transliteration: "Purizun Bureiku" (Japanese: プリズン・ブレイク)	Junko Kōmura	July 17, 2016
While confronting the Dethgalien Player Prisonable, Tusk and Misao end up imprisoned inside an underground dungeon. With Misao blaming himself for putting themselves in such predicament, Tusk resigns himself to look for an exit alone, until Misao decides to rise up and come to his aid, assisted by a new ally that awakens just in time to help them.
22	"Awakening? Is It Wrong?"; Transliteration: "Kakusei ka? Kanchigai ka?" (Japanese: 覚醒か？カン違いか？)	Junko Kōmura	July 24, 2016
When a bicycle explodes just after he touches it, Misao believes that he was afflicted with some kind of curse, until he learns that it was just a trick from another Dethgalien Player, who set up a massive bomb in the city, and the other Zyuohgers discover, much to their surprise, that Misao has a new, unexplored power that is the key to find it. After defusing the bomb, the Zyuohgers confront the threat by pooling all their Zyuoh Cubes into their strongest robot yet.
23	"Megabeast Hunter"; Transliteration: "Kyojū Hantā" (Japanese: 巨獣ハンター)	Junko Kōmura	July 31, 2016
Bangray, the Megabeast Hunter, arrives on Earth looking for some new prey and gets himself involved in the Blood Game when he proves himself a powerful foe against the Zyuohgers, drawing the attention of the Dethgaliens.
24	"Revived Memory"; Transliteration: "Yomigaeru Kioku" (Japanese: よみがえる記憶)	Junko Kōmura	August 7, 2016
After being convinced by Ginis to join the Dethgaliens, Bangray attacks Yamato and knocks him unconscious. Once awakening, he meets his mother, who was supposed to be dead, and by the time his friends discover the true nature of Bangray's powers, they rush to help him.
25	"Unhappy Camera"; Transliteration: "Anhappī Kamera" (Japanese: アンハッピー・カメラ)	Jin Tanaka	August 14, 2016
Worried that Yamato may be still aflicted by the events of the last battle, Misao comes across a way to cheer him up, unaware that he fell into a scheme from another Dethgalien Player. Meanwhile, Quval is in distress with the fact that Bangray have read his mind and attacks the hunter in order to silence him.
26	"I Want to Protect the Precious Day"; Transliteration: "Taisetsu na Hi o Mamoritai" (Japanese: 大切な日を守りたい)	Jin Tanaka	August 21, 2016
Yamato meets Daichi Hayashi, a friend from college and is invited to his marriage. With no leads regarding the prey he is looking for on Earth, Bangray decides to torment Yamato once more by attacking the ceremony, and the other Zyuohgers decide to fight the intruder by themselves.
27	"Which One Is Real?"; Transliteration: "Honmono wa Dotchi da?" (Japanese: 本物はどっちだ？)	Naruhisa Arakawa	August 28, 2016
In another plot to make the Zyuohgers suffer, Bangray makes copies of Sela and Tusk and rigs them along the original ones with explosives, giving Yamato and the others 30 minutes to figure out the impostors and slay them before the bombs detonate, killing all four of them.
28	"The Space Pirates Return"; Transliteration: "Kaettekita Uchū Kaizoku" (Japanese: 帰ってきた宇宙海賊)	Junko Kōmura	September 4, 2016
Captain Marvelous from the Gokaigers appears and extracts a giant Champion's Proof that was hidden inside the Link Cube, but the Zyuohgers refuse to let him leave with a relic from Zyuland and fight him for its possession. However, Bangray appears to claim it as well, and a three-way battle begins.: First part of a crossover with Kaizoku Sentai Gokaiger.
29	"Champion of the Champions"; Transliteration: "Ōja no Naka no Ōja" (Japanese: 王者の中の王者)	Junko Kōmura	September 11, 2016
The Zyuohgers and the Gokaigers join forces against Bangray, who summons fallen enemies of the previous Super Sentai to fight by his side. In the occasion, Yamato obtains the power of the Great Champion's Proof and a new transformation.: Second part of the crossover with Kaizoku Sentai Gokaiger, also celebrating the 2000th episode and 40th anniversary of the Super Sentai Franchise.
30	"The Legendary Megabeast"; Transliteration: "Densetsu no Kyojū" (Japanese: 伝説の巨獣)	Junko Kōmura	September 18, 2016
Having obtained the Whale Change Gun, the Zyuohgers begin their search for the ultimate Zyuoh Cube, Cube Whale. However, Bangray stands on their way once again, as the Megabeast Hunter intends to make Cube Whale his 100th prey.
31	"When the Megabeast Stands"; Transliteration: "Kyojū Tatsu Toki" (Japanese: 巨獣立つ時)	Junko Kōmura	September 25, 2016
The Zyuohgers are having a hard time trying to calm down Cube Whale, while fighting to protect it from Bangray and the Dethgaliens, but to make matters even worse, Ginis sends an upgraded version of his Gift destruction machine upon them.
32	"The Dark Side of the Heart"; Transliteration: "Kokoro wa Uraomote" (Japanese: 心は裏表)	Kento Shimoyama	October 2, 2016
The Blood Games start again and the Zyuohgers come across an enemy that brings forth their hidden, darkest feelings, creating a divide between Misao and the rest of the team, until Misao himself decides to face his friends head on in order to understand them better.
33	"Nekodamashi and Gratitude"; Transliteration: "Nekodamashi no Ongaeshi" (Japanese: 猫だましの恩返し)	Kento Shimoyama	October 9, 2016
A new Dethgalien Player challenges the Zyuohgers a Sumo fight. With the others out of commission, Leo and Amu decide to ask for help from some real sumo practitioners in order to beat the enemy in his own game.
34	"The Megabeast Hunter Strikes Back"; Transliteration: "Kyojū Hantā no Gyakushū" (Japanese: 巨獣ハンターの逆襲)	Junko Kōmura	October 16, 2016
Bangray returns after recovering from the wounds suffered in his last fight, and the Zyuohgers come with a plan to lure the Megabeast Hunter into a trap, but what they did not predict was his unexpected move to deceive them.
35	"The Last Day of the Zyuohgers"; Transliteration: "Jūōjā Saigo no Hi" (Japanese: ジュウオウジャー最後の日)	Junko Kōmura	October 23, 2016
Bangray kidnaps Yamato and demands his friends to hand over Cube Whale as ransom. Certain that the Megabeast Hunter will not uphold his part of the bargain, the other Zyuohgers make their own move to outsmart him and rescue Yamato, leading to the Zyuohgers' decisive battle against Bangray, in which they assemble all their Zyuoh Cubes into their most powerful mecha ever.
36	"The Prince of Halloween"; Transliteration: "Harowin no Ōji-sama" (Japanese: ハロウィンの王子様)	Jin Tanaka	October 30, 2016
Halloween has come and while fighting to protect a girl called Mami from the Dethgaliens, Tusk earns her affection, to the point that she starts viewing him as her enchanted prince, much to his chagrin.
37	"Champion of the Heavens"; Transliteration: "Tenkū no Ōja" (Japanese: 天空の王者)	Junko Kōmura	November 13, 2016
Larry discovers a giant Zyuoh Cube and informs the Zyuohgers, but while they are trying to activate it, they must confront the Saguiru Brothers from Team Azald, but somehow when one is defeated, another appear to replace him. When one of them corners Yamato, Bud, the Bird Man reappears, using the Champion's Proof in his possession to transform into a Zyuohger as well.
38	"High in the Sky, Flying Wings"; Transliteration: "Sora Takaku, Tsubasa Mau" (Japanese: 空高く、翼舞う)	Junko Kōmura	November 20, 2016
Having transformed into Zyuoh Bird, Bud helps the other Zyuohgers against the Saguiru Brothers, and reveals to Yamato the reason why he stole the Champion's Proof, claiming that Zyuland must be separated from the human world no matter the cost.
39	"Calories and a Necklace"; Transliteration: "Karorī to Nekkuresu" (Japanese: カロリーとネックレス)	Jin Tanaka	November 27, 2016
Sela meets a man who becomes interested on her and attempts to impress her by all means. Little she knows that it´s all a scheme by Quval, who is experimenting with the powers he stole from Bangray.
40	"Men's Aesthetics"; Transliteration: "Otoko no Bigaku" (Japanese: 男の美学)	Jin Tanaka	December 4, 2016
Leo befriends a boy and helps him to get back at some older kids that are bullying at him, but Quval decides to take the opportunity to lay a trap on them.
41	"The First and the Last Chance"; Transliteration: "Saisho de Saigo no Chansu" (Japanese: 最初で最後のチャンス)	Junko Kōmura	December 11, 2016
The Zyuohgers hear that Ginis captured Misao and challenged them personally. Little they know that it's all part of a scheme by Quval to draw Ginis to a trap and have his revenge. However, when the Zyuohgers agree to help Quval fight Ginis, the Dethgalien leader uses the data obtained from Cube Whale to transform into an even bigger threat.
42	"The Fate of This Planet"; Transliteration: "Kono Hoshi no Yukue" (Japanese: この星の行方)	Junko Kōmura	December 18, 2016
The Zyuohgers take the injured Misao to the care of a doctor, who coincidentally, is Yamato's father. Still terrified by the sight of Ginis' power, Quval makes one desperate last stand against the Zyuohgers hoping to earn his mercy.
43	"The Christmas Witness"; Transliteration: "Kurisumasu no Mokugekisha" (Japanese: クリスマスの目撃者)	Junko Kōmura	December 25, 2016
Christmas is at hand and Sela, Tusk, Leo and Amu decide to give Uncle Mario a present as a sign of thanks for his hospitality. However, when Azald attacks the Zyuohgers, Mario witness their battle, and accidentally discovers their secret.
44	"Champion of Humanity"; Transliteration: "Jinrui no Ōja" (Japanese: 人類の王者)	Junko Kōmura	January 8, 2017
Having discovered their secret, Mario hears all the truth from Yamato and the others. Meanwhile, Bud mets Larry and the two try to analyze together the piece left from Azald.
45	"The Broken Seal"; Transliteration: "Toketa Fūin" (Japanese: 解けた封印)	Junko Kōmura	January 15, 2017
Seeking the fragment in Bud's possession, Azald fights the Zyuohgers himself. During the battle, he recovers his memories and reverts to his original form, revealing himself as the monster that was stopped by Cetus long ago. Now stronger than ever, Azald proves himself as the most powerful threat the Zyuohgers have faced so far.
46	"The Immortal God of Destruction"; Transliteration: "Fujimi no Hakaishin" (Japanese: 不死身の破壊神)	Junko Kōmura	January 22, 2017
Now back in his original form with his memories restored, Azald defects from the Dethgaliens and proceeds to destroy Earth himself. As the other Zyuohgers confront the enemy, Bud meets Yamato's father, and the reason why he is always prone to protect his son is revealed.
47	"The Last Game"; Transliteration: "Saigo no Gēmu" (Japanese: 最後のゲーム)	Junko Kōmura	January 29, 2017
With both team leaders gone, Ginis decides to personally end the 100th Blood Game by infusing some his own cells onto the Earth, causing it to start cracking. Bud comes up with a plan to save the planet, but once they learn that it would permanently sever Earth's connection to Zyuland, the other Zyuohgers refuse and decide to take matters with their own hands instead.
48 (Final)	"Earth Is Our Home"; Transliteration: "Chikyū wa Waga Ya sa" (Japanese: 地球は我が家さ)	Junko Kōmura	February 5, 2017
The Zyuohgers have their final battle against Ginis to save Earth from him once and for all.
