= Does the Flower Blossom? =

Japanese manga series

- Cover of the Japanese version of vol. 1, released on December 24, 2009

花は咲くか (Hana wa Saku ka)
- Genre: Boys' love
- Manga
- Written by: Shoko Hidaka
- Published by: Gentosha
- English publisher: NA: Digital Manga Publishing
- Imprint: Birz Comics Rutile Collection
- Magazine: Rutile
- Original run: August 2006 – January 2015
- Volumes: 5
- Live-action film
- Directed by: Kaori Tanimoto
- Produced by: Hitoshi Matsumoto; Yasushi Udagawa
- Written by: Natsuko Takahashi
- Studio: Toei Studios
- Released: February 24, 2018
- Runtime: 88 minutes

Does the Flower Blossom? (Japanese: 花は咲くか, Hepburn: Hana wa Saku ka) is a Japanese manga series written and illustrated by Shoko Hidaka. It was serialized in the monthly manga magazine Rutile from August 2006 to January 2015. It was adapted into a live-action film that was released on 24 February 2018.

== Characters ==
Youichi Minagawa (水川 蓉一, Minagawa Yōichi)
Voiced by: Takashi Kondo (audio drama); played by: Tsurugi Watanabe (film)
Youichi is a 19-year-old college student.
Kazuaki Sakurai (桜井 和明, Sakurai Kazuaki)
Voiced by: Toshiyuki Morikawa (audio drama); played by: Kousei Amano (film)
Sakurai is a 38-year-old salaryman who Youichi is attracted to.
Takeo Iwasaki (岩崎 竹生, Iwazaki Takeo)
Voiced by: Satoshi Hino (audio drama); played by: Atomu Mizuishi (film)
Takeo is Youichi's cousin and lives with him.
Shouta Minagawa (水川 菖太, Minagawa Shōta)
Voiced by: Nobuhiko Okamoto (audio drama); played by: Yuito Obara (film)
Shouta is Youichi's cousin and lives with him.
Kouki Fujimoto (藤本 浩輝, Fujimoto Kōki)
Voiced by: Tatsuhisa Suzuki (audio drama); played by: Akihisa Shiono (film)
Kouki is Youichi's friend from college who is also interested in him.
Kippei Yoshitomi (吉富 桔平, Yoshitomi Kippei)
Voiced by: Ryō Sugisaki (audio drama); played by: Yasukaze Motomiya (film)
Kippei is the landlord of Youichi's home.

== Media ==
=== Manga ===
Does the Flower Blossom? is written and illustrated by Shoko Hidaka. It is serialized in the monthly boys' love manga magazine Rutile from the August 2006 issue to the January 2015 issue. The chapters were later released in five bound volumes by Gentosha under the Birz Comics Rutile Collection imprint.

In 2012, Digital Manga Publishing announced at Yaoi-Con that they had licensed the first three volumes in English for North American distribution. The series was published under their Juné imprint. Volume 1 was originally scheduled to be released in July 2013, but it was delayed until December 2013, until finally releasing in 2014.

No.	Original release date	Original ISBN	English release date	English ISBN
1	December 24, 2009	978-4-344-81827-9	October 29, 2014	978-1-56970-316-8
2	September 24, 2010	978-4-344-82041-8	25 February 2015	978-1-56970-317-5
3	December 24, 2011	978-4-344-82380-8	24 May 2016	978-1-56970-318-2
4	April 24, 2014	978-4-344-82801-8	—	—
5	March 31, 2015	978-4-344-83385-2 (regular edition); 978-4-344-83386-9 (limited edition)	—	—

=== Film ===
A live-action film adaptation produced by Toei Studios was announced in September 2017, starring Tsurugi Watanabe in his debut film role as Youichi Minagawa. Kousei Amano was later cast as Kazuaki Sakurai. Additional cast members include Akihisa Shiono, Yuito Obara, Atomu Mizuishi, and Yasukaze Motomiya. The film is directed by Kaori Tanimoto, with the script written by Natsuko Takahashi. It was released in theaters in Japan on February 24, 2018. The film's theme song is "Futari Negai Boshi" by Mika Tsunaki, which was released as a single on February 14, 2018. Postcards exclusively illustrated by Shoko Hidaka were distributed during the theatrical run, with the first week distributing a postcard of Youichi and the second week distributing a postcard of Sakurai.

== Reception ==
In 2018, Does the Flower Blossom? was selected by visitors of the website Nijimen as one of the best boys' love manga for newcomers to the genre.
