= Haruka Tateishi =

Japanese model and actress (born 1994)

- 立石 晴香
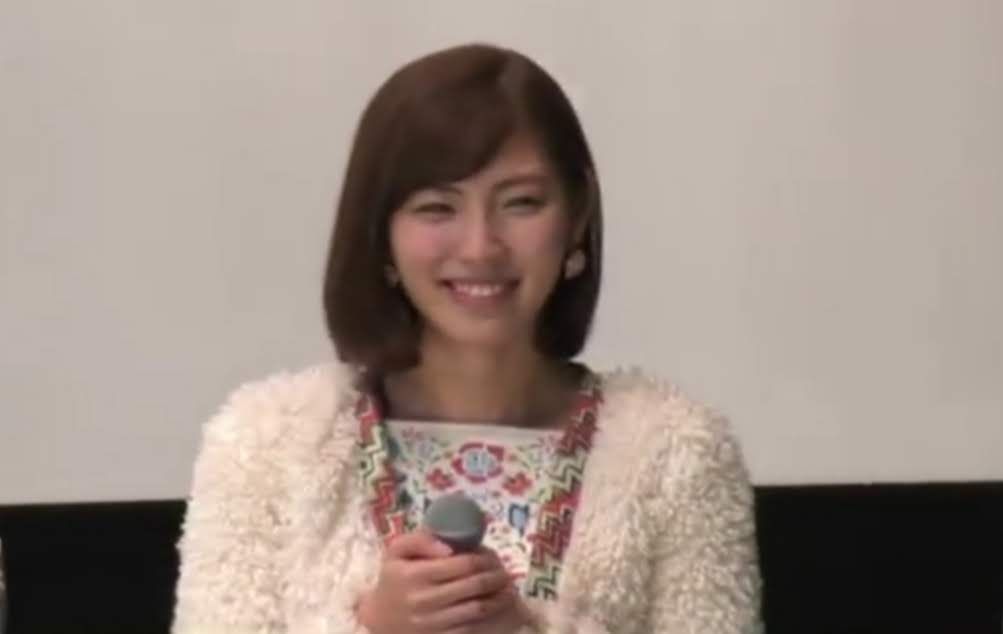
- Tateishi in 2017
- Born: September 28, 1994 (age 31); Osaka Prefecture, Japan
- Other name: Haruka (ハルカ)
- Occupations: Model, actress
- Years active: 2007-2013; 2015-present
- Agents: Ever Green Creative (2007-2013); Hirata Office (2015-2022); For You (2022-2023); Oscar Promotion (2023-)
- Known for: Role in Doubutsu Sentai Zyuohger
- Height: 165 cm (5 ft 5 in)

Haruka Tateishi (立石 晴香 Tateishi Haruka, born September 28, 1994, in Osaka Prefecture, Japan) is a Japanese actress and model who is currently represented by Oscar Promotion. She is well known for her role as Amu/Zyuoh Tiger in the 40th entry of the Super Sentai series, Doubutsu Sentai Zyuohger.

== Biography ==
In 2007, Tateishi won the Grand Prix award in the 11th Model Audition for the Japanese magazine Nicola, aimed towards girls of young age. She subsequently began modeling for the magazine in the first October issue of the same year. She first got on the cover of the magazine in the September 2008 issue. Tateishi graduated from Nicola as a model in April 2011. She became an exclusive model of Seventeen from June 2011 onwards.

Tateishi graduated from Seventeen magazine in October 2013. She also left Ever Green Creative, her management company at the time, and announced her retirement from the entertainment industry. During retirement, she got a job at a general company and familiarized herself with the environment and gained experience from working with others.

In late 2015, it was announced that she came out of her retirement and was cast as Amu/Zyuoh Tiger in Doubutsu Sentai Zyuohger, the 40th entry of Toei Company's long running Super Sentai franchise. The season began airing in early February 2016.

In January 2022 she left Hirata Office. On 8 July 2022 she announced that she had signed up with the company "For You" as her new management.

In June 2023, she signed up with Oscar Promotion.

== Filmography ==
=== Magazines ===
| Year | Title | Notes |
|---|---|---|
| 2007 | Nicola | Exclusive model |
| 2011 | Seventeen | Exclusive model |

=== Movies ===
| Year | Title | Role | Notes |
|---|---|---|---|
| 2016 | Shuriken Sentai Ninninger vs. ToQger the Movie: Ninja in Wonderland | Zyuoh Tiger | Voice role |
| 2016 | Doubutsu Sentai Zyuohger the Movie: The Exciting Circus Panic! | Amu/Zyuoh Tiger | |
| 2017 | Doubutsu Sentai Zyuohger vs. Ninninger the Movie: Super Sentai's Message from the Future | Amu/Zyuoh Tiger | |
| 2017 | Kamen Rider × Super Sentai: Ultra Super Hero Taisen | Amu/Zyuoh Tiger | Lead role |
| 2017 | Doubutsu Sentai Zyuohger Returns: Give Me Your Life! Earth Champion Tournament | Amu/Zyuoh Tiger | |
| 2018 | 1 Out of 400,000 | Mami Higashiyama | Lead role |
| 2019 | Prison 13 | Getsuyo | |
| 2022 | Kamen Rider Revice: Battle Familia | Yume Takeda | |

=== Others ===
| Year | Title | Role | Notes |
|---|---|---|---|
| 2017 | Power Rangers Dino Force Brave | Zyuoh Tiger | Voice role (Cameo, Episode 12. Japanese dub only) |

=== Dramas ===
| Year | Title | Role | Network | Notes | Ref. |
|---|---|---|---|---|---|
| 2009 | Reset | | NTV | Final episode | |
| 2010 | Hammer Session! | Momoka Inoue | TBS | | |
| 2016 | Doubutsu Sentai Zyuohger | Amu / Zyuoh Tiger | TV Asahi | | |
| 2016 | Chef: Three Star School Lunch | Azusa Ishibashi | Fuji TV | Guest role (Episode 6) | |
| 2018 | Parfait Tic! | Kei Iori | FOD | Guest role (Episodes 5–8) | |
| 2018 | Survival Wedding | Yuri Nakatani | NTV | | |
| 2019 | Aibou Season 13 | Rita Tsubakiieji | TV Asahi | Guest role (Episode 13) | |
| 2023 | Keishichō Outsider | Michiru Matsubara | TV Asahi | Guest role (Episode 2) | |

=== Stage shows ===
| Year | Title | Notes |
|---|---|---|
| 2007 | Yami no Mon | |

=== Advertisements ===
| Year | Title | Notes |
|---|---|---|
| 2009 | Rohto Pharmaceutical Mentholatum | |
| 2009 | Baskin-Robbins "Double Cone Double Cup 31% Off" | |
| 2011 | Vantan Design School | Image model |
| 2012 | Tomy CodeColle | |

=== Events ===
| Year | Title | Notes |
|---|---|---|
| 2010 | Kobe Collection 2010 Spring/Summer | |
| 2010 | Kobe Collection 2010 Autumn/Winter | |
| 2011 | Tokyo Girls Collection 2011 Autumn/Winter | Saitama Super Arena |
| 2012 | Tokyo Girls Collection 2012 Spring/Summer | Yokohama Arena |
