= Doubutsu Sentai Zyuohger =

Japanese Tokusatsu drama

- Genre: Tokusatsu; Superhero fiction Action/fantasy fiction Comedy-Drama
- Created by: TV Asahi; Toei Company
- Written by: Junko Kōmura; Jin Tanaka; Naruhisa Arakawa; Kento Shimoyama
- Directed by: Takayuki Shibasaki; Teruaki Sugihara; Shojiro Nakazawa; Hiroyuki Kato; Noboru Takemoto
- Starring: Masaki Nakao; Miki Yanagi; Shohei Nanba; Tsurugi Watanabe; Haruka Tateishi; Naoki Kunishima; Kohei Murakami; Susumu Terajima
- Narrated by: Chō
- Opening theme: "Doubutsu Sentai Zyuohger"; Performed by Hideaki Takatori (Project.R)
- Ending theme: "Let's! Zyuoh Dance"; Performed by Yohei Onishi (Project.R)
- Composer: Koichiro Kameyama
- Country of origin: Japan
- Original language: Japanese
- No. of episodes: 48 (list of episodes)

Production
- Executive producer: Motoi Sasaki (TV Asahi)
- Producers: Chihiro Inoue (TV Asahi); Takaaki Utsunomiya (Toei); Hiroaki Shibata (Toei); Takashi Mochizuki (Toei); Kōichi Yada (Toei Agency); Akihiro Fukada (Toei Agency)
- Production location: Tokyo, Japan (Greater Tokyo Area)
- Running time: 24–25 minutes
- Production companies: TV Asahi; Toei Company; Toei Agency

Original release
- Network: TV Asahi
- Release: February 14, 2016 – February 5, 2017

Related
- Shuriken Sentai Ninninger; Uchu Sentai Kyuranger

Doubutsu Sentai Zyuohger (動物戦隊ジュウオウジャー, Dōbutsu Sentai Jūōjā; Animal Squadron Zyuohger) is a Japanese Tokusatsu drama and the 40th entry of Toei's long-running Super Sentai metaseries, following Shuriken Sentai Ninninger. It aired from February 14, 2016 to February 5, 2017, replacing Shuriken Sentai Ninninger and was replaced by Uchu Sentai Kyuranger. The program joining Kamen Rider Ghost, and later, Kamen Rider Ex-Aid in the Super Hero Time line-up on TV Asahi affiliate stations. Released as part of Super Sentai's 40th anniversary and Toei's "Super Hero Year", Zyuohger is the seventh series in the franchise whose central theme is animals. (Note: Other official animal-themed Super Sentai include Taiyo Sentai Sun Vulcan, Choujyu Sentai Liveman, Chōjin Sentai Jetman, Seijuu Sentai Gingaman, Hyakujuu Sentai Gaoranger, and Juken Sentai Gekiranger.) The series also has a Minecraft-inspired and Rubik's Cube motif. The lead screenwriter for the series is Junko Kōmura.

The cast and characters were revealed at an event at Tokyo Dome City on January 23 and 24, 2016, while the characters had their official debut in the film Shuriken Sentai Ninninger vs. ToQger the Movie: Ninja in Wonderland.

Zyuohger began airing in South Korea as Power Rangers Animal Force.

Two of the series villain costumes and a prop were used for the 30th seasons of the American Power Rangers series (Power Rangers Cosmic Fury, which was adapting the 2017 Sentai installment, Uchu Sentai Kyuranger).

== Story ==
Yamato Kazakiri, a zoologist, uncovers Zyuland, a world inhabited by an anthropomorphic animal race known as the Zyumen (ジューマン, Jūman). However, it coincides with the arrival of the Dethgaliens (デスガリアン, Desugarian) from outer space who have chosen Earth to be the site of their 100th Blood Game (ブラッドゲーム, Buraddo Gēmu) competition. Four of the Zyumen – the shark woman Sela, the lion man Leo, the elephant man Tusk, and the white tiger woman Amu – try to defend Zyuland from the Dethgaliens but their fight takes them to Earth, with Yamato in tow, and it is revealed that he possesses an artifact known as the Champion's Proof, the fifth of a set also possessed by his Zyuman companions. The Champion's Proofs transform into devices that allow the five of them to transform into the Zyuohgers and fight the Dethgalien general attacking the Earth. After the fight, the Zyumen realize that they are now trapped in the human world, as there needs to be six Champion's Proofs for them to return to Zyuland. Yamato helps the four Zyumen live in the human world while they search for the sixth Champion's Proof, all the while continuing to battle the Dethgaliens who have added the Zyuohgers to their Blood Game festivities, which become even more intense when the invaders kidnap the human Misao Mondo and transform him into an artificial Zyuohger to fight in their stead. However, once the Zyuohgers release Misao from the Dethgaliens' control, he joins their side as Zyuoh The World, while Bud, an old acquaintance of Yamato's family, later uses the sixth and final Champion's Proof to join the fight as Zyuoh Bird.

== Episodes ==
No.	Title	Written by	Original release date
1	"The Exciting Animal Land"; Transliteration: "Dokidoki Dōbutsu Rando" (Japanese: どきどき動物ランド)	Junko Kōmura	February 14, 2016
2	"Don't Underestimate This Planet"; Transliteration: "Kono Hoshi o Nameru na yo" (Japanese: この星をなめるなよ)	Junko Kōmura	February 21, 2016
3	"I Want to Go Home but We Can't Go Home"; Transliteration: "Kaeritai kedo Kaerenai" (Japanese: 帰りたいけど帰れない)	Junko Kōmura	February 28, 2016
4	"Roar in the Ring"; Transliteration: "Ringu ni Hoero" (Japanese: リングに吼えろ)	Junko Kōmura	March 6, 2016
5	"Champion of the Jungle"; Transliteration: "Janguru no Ōja" (Japanese: ジャングルの王者)	Junko Kōmura	March 13, 2016
6	"A Wild Present"; Transliteration: "Wairudo na Purezento" (Japanese: ワイルドなプレゼント)	Junko Kōmura	March 20, 2016
7	"Go-Go-Go Ghost Appears"; Transliteration: "Gogogo Gōsuto ga Deta" (Japanese: ゴゴゴゴーストが出た)	Naruhisa Arakawa	March 27, 2016
8	"Savanna's Melody"; Transliteration: "Sabanna no Merodī" (Japanese: サバンナのメロディー)	Junko Kōmura	April 3, 2016
9	"The Endless Day"; Transliteration: "Owaranai Ichinichi" (Japanese: 終わらない一日)	Naruhisa Arakawa	April 10, 2016
10	"The Most Dangerous Game"; Transliteration: "Mottmo Kiken na Gēmu" (Japanese: 最も危険なゲーム)	Junko Kōmura	April 17, 2016
11	"Animal Assembly"; Transliteration: "Dōbutsu Daishūgō" (Japanese: 動物大集合)	Junko Kōmura	April 24, 2016
12	"The Short-Nosed Elephant"; Transliteration: "Hana no Mijikai Zō" (Japanese: はなのみじかいゾウ)	Jin Tanaka	May 1, 2016
13	"The Summit Witness"; Transliteration: "Sanchō no Mokugekisha" (Japanese: 山頂の目撃者)	Junko Kōmura	May 8, 2016
14	"The Foolish Lying Thief"; Transliteration: "Usotsuki Dorobō Obaka-kei" (Japanese: ウソつきドロボーおバカ系)	Naruhisa Arakawa	May 15, 2016
15	"The Terrifying Sniper"; Transliteration: "Senritsu no Sunaipā" (Japanese: 戦慄のスナイパー)	Naruhisa Arakawa	May 22, 2016
16	"Find Zyumans"; Transliteration: "Jūman o Sagase" (Japanese: ジューマンをさがせ)	Jin Tanaka	May 29, 2016
17	"The Extra Player's Intrusion"; Transliteration: "Ekusutora Pureiyā, Rannyū" (Japanese: エクストラプレイヤー、乱入)	Junko Kōmura	June 5, 2016
18	"Etched Terror"; Transliteration: "Kizamareta Kyōfu" (Japanese: きざまれた恐怖)	Junko Kōmura	June 12, 2016
19	"Who to Believe in" Transliteration: "Shinjiru no wa Dare" (Japanese: 信じるのは誰)	Junko Kōmura	June 26, 2016
20	"Champion of the World"; Transliteration: "Sekai no Ōja" (Japanese: 世界の王者)	Junko Kōmura	July 3, 2016
21	"Prison Break"; Transliteration: "Purizun Bureiku" (Japanese: プリズン・ブレイク)	Junko Kōmura	July 17, 2016
22	"Awakening? Is It Wrong?"; Transliteration: "Kakusei ka? Kanchigai ka?" (Japanese: 覚醒か？カン違いか？)	Junko Kōmura	July 24, 2016
23	"Megabeast Hunter"; Transliteration: "Kyojū Hantā" (Japanese: 巨獣ハンター)	Junko Kōmura	July 31, 2016
24	"Revived Memory"; Transliteration: "Yomigaeru Kioku" (Japanese: よみがえる記憶)	Junko Kōmura	August 7, 2016
25	"Unhappy Camera"; Transliteration: "Anhappī Kamera" (Japanese: アンハッピー・カメラ)	Jin Tanaka	August 14, 2016
26	"I Want to Protect the Precious Day"; Transliteration: "Taisetsu na Hi o Mamoritai" (Japanese: 大切な日を守りたい)	Jin Tanaka	August 21, 2016
27	"Which One Is Real?"; Transliteration: "Honmono wa Dotchi da?" (Japanese: 本物はどっちだ？)	Naruhisa Arakawa	August 28, 2016
28	"The Space Pirates Return"; Transliteration: "Kaettekita Uchū Kaizoku" (Japanese: 帰ってきた宇宙海賊)	Junko Kōmura	September 4, 2016
29	"Champion of the Champions"; Transliteration: "Ōja no Naka no Ōja" (Japanese: 王者の中の王者)	Junko Kōmura	September 11, 2016
30	"The Legendary Megabeast"; Transliteration: "Densetsu no Kyojū" (Japanese: 伝説の巨獣)	Junko Kōmura	September 18, 2016
31	"When the Megabeast Stands"; Transliteration: "Kyojū Tatsu Toki" (Japanese: 巨獣立つ時)	Junko Kōmura	September 25, 2016
32	"The Dark Side of the Heart"; Transliteration: "Kokoro wa Uraomote" (Japanese: 心は裏表)	Kento Shimoyama	October 2, 2016
33	"Nekodamashi and Gratitude"; Transliteration: "Nekodamashi no Ongaeshi" (Japanese: 猫だましの恩返し)	Kento Shimoyama	October 9, 2016
34	"The Megabeast Hunter Strikes Back"; Transliteration: "Kyojū Hantā no Gyakushū" (Japanese: 巨獣ハンターの逆襲)	Junko Kōmura	October 16, 2016
35	"The Last Day of the Zyuohgers"; Transliteration: "Jūōjā Saigo no Hi" (Japanese: ジュウオウジャー最後の日)	Junko Kōmura	October 23, 2016
36	"The Prince of Halloween"; Transliteration: "Harowin no Ōji-sama" (Japanese: ハロウィンの王子様)	Jin Tanaka	October 30, 2016
37	"Champion of the Heavens"; Transliteration: "Tenkū no Ōja" (Japanese: 天空の王者)	Junko Kōmura	November 13, 2016
38	"High in the Sky, Flying Wings"; Transliteration: "Sora Takaku, Tsubasa Mau" (Japanese: 空高く、翼舞う)	Junko Kōmura	November 20, 2016
39	"Calories and a Necklace"; Transliteration: "Karorī to Nekkuresu" (Japanese: カロリーとネックレス)	Jin Tanaka	November 27, 2016
40	"Men's Aesthetics"; Transliteration: "Otoko no Bigaku" (Japanese: 男の美学)	Jin Tanaka	December 4, 2016
41	"The First and the Last Chance"; Transliteration: "Saisho de Saigo no Chansu" (Japanese: 最初で最後のチャンス)	Junko Kōmura	December 11, 2016
42	"The Fate of This Planet"; Transliteration: "Kono Hoshi no Yukue" (Japanese: この星の行方)	Junko Kōmura	December 18, 2016
43	"The Christmas Witness"; Transliteration: "Kurisumasu no Mokugekisha" (Japanese: クリスマスの目撃者)	Junko Kōmura	December 25, 2016
44	"Champion of Humanity"; Transliteration: "Jinrui no Ōja" (Japanese: 人類の王者)	Junko Kōmura	January 8, 2017
45	"The Broken Seal"; Transliteration: "Toketa Fūin" (Japanese: 解けた封印)	Junko Kōmura	January 15, 2017
46	"The Immortal God of Destruction"; Transliteration: "Fujimi no Hakaishin" (Japanese: 不死身の破壊神)	Junko Kōmura	January 22, 2017
47	"The Last Game"; Transliteration: "Saigo no Gēmu" (Japanese: 最後のゲーム)	Junko Kōmura	January 29, 2017
48 (Final)	"Earth Is Our Home"; Transliteration: "Chikyū wa Waga Ya sa" (Japanese: 地球は我が家さ)	Junko Kōmura	February 5, 2017

== Production ==
The trademark for the series was filed by Toei Company on September 7, 2015.

== Films and Specials ==
The Zyuohgers made their first appearance as a cameo in the crossover film Shuriken Sentai Ninninger vs. ToQger the Movie: Ninja in Wonderland.

=== Theatrical ===
==== The Exciting Circus Panic! ====
Doubutsu Sentai Zyuohger the Movie: The Exciting Circus Panic! (劇場版 動物戦隊ジュウオウジャー ドキドキ サーカス パニック！, Gekijōban Dōbutsu Sentai Jūōjā Dokidoki Sākasu Panikku!) was released in Japanese theaters on August 6, 2016, double-billed with Kamen Rider Ghost: The 100 Eyecons and Ghost's Fated Moment. The event of the movie takes place between Episode 22 and 23.

==== Zyuohger vs. Ninninger ====
Doubutsu Sentai Zyuohger vs. Ninninger the Movie: Super Sentai's Message from the Future (劇場版 動物戦隊ジュウオウジャーVSニンニンジャー 未来からのメッセージfromスーパー戦隊, Gekijōban Dōbutsu Sentai Jūōjā Tai Ninninjā Mirai kara no Messēji Furomu Sūpā Sentai), is a feature film featuring a crossover between Zyuohger and Shuriken Sentai Ninninger & The heroes of Uchu Sentai Kyuranger also make a cameo appearance in the film, released on January 14, 2017. The event of the movie takes place between Episode 38 and 39.

==== Ultra Super Hero Taisen ====
A crossover film, titled Kamen Rider × Super Sentai: Ultra Super Hero Taisen (仮面ライダー×スーパー戦隊 超スーパーヒーロー大戦, Kamen Raidā × Supā Sentai Chō Supā Hīrō Taisen) featuring the casts of Kamen Rider Ex-Aid, Amazon Riders, Uchu Sentai Kyuranger, and Doubutsu Sentai Zyuohger, was released in Japan on March 25, 2017. This movie also celebrates the 10th anniversary of Kamen Rider Den-O and features the spaceship Andor Genesis from the Xevious game, which is used by the movie's main antagonists, as well as introduces the movie-exclusive Kamen Rider True Brave, played by Kamen Rider Brave's actor Toshiki Seto from Kamen Rider Ex-Aid, and the villain Shocker Great Leader III, played by the singer Diamond Yukai. In addition, individual actors from older Kamen Rider and Super Sentai TV series, Ryohei Odai (Kamen Rider Ryuki), Gaku Matsumoto (Shuriken Sentai Ninninger), Atsushi Maruyama (Zyuden Sentai Kyoryuger), and Hiroya Matsumoto (Tokumei Sentai Go-Busters) reprise their respective roles.

==== Red Battle! All Sentai Great Assemble!! ====
Kikai Sentai Zenkaiger the Movie: Red Battle! All Sentai Great Assemble!! (機界戦隊ゼンカイジャー THE MOVIE 赤い戦い！オール戦隊大集会!!, Kikai Sentai Zenkaijā Za Mūbī Akai Tatakai! Ōru Sentai Daishūkai!!) is a film released in Japanese theaters on February 20, 2021, as part of Super Sentai Movie Ranger 2021 (スーパー戦隊MOVIEレンジャー2021, Sūpā Sentai Mūbī Renjā Nisen-nijū-ichi), alongside Mashin Sentai Kiramager the Movie: Be-Bop Dream and Kishiryu Sentai Ryusoulger Special: Memory of Soulmates. Naoya Makoto (Himitsu Sentai Gorenger), Kei Hosogai (Kaizoku Sentai Gokaiger), and Jingi Irie (Kaitou Sentai Lupinranger VS Keisatsu Sentai Patranger) reprise their respective roles, and Nobutoshi Canna (Doubutsu Sentai Zyuohger) and Megumi Han (Shuriken Sentai Ninninger) reprise their respective voice roles.

=== V-Cinema ===
==== Give Me Your Life! Earth Champion Tournament ====
Doubutsu Sentai Zyuohger Returns: Give Me Your Life! Earth Champion Tournament (帰ってきた動物戦隊ジュウオウジャー お命頂戴！地球王者決定戦, Kaettekita Dōbutsu Sentai Jūōjā Oinochi Chōdai! Chikyū Ōja Ketteisen) is a direct-to-video film released on June 28, 2017. Original characters (Dethgalien executives and Perle) are set to return in addition to new casts, such as rakugoka Hayashiya Taihei as Pocane Daniro and Rie Kugimiya as Lilian. The film also features the movie-exclusive Zyuoh Condor, and the events of the movie take place after the final episode of the series.

==== Lupinranger VS Patranger VS Kyuranger ====
Lupinranger VS Patranger VS Kyuranger (ルパンレンジャーVSパトレンジャーVSキュウレンジャー, Rupanrenjā Bui Esu Patorenjā Bui Esu Kyūrenjā) is a V-Cinema release that features a crossover between Lupinranger VS Patranger and Uchu Sentai Kyuranger, also including Misao Mondo/Zyuoh The World from Doubutsu Sentai Zyuohger reprising his role. The V-Cinema was released on August 21, 2019. The events of the film take place between episodes 42 and 43.

==== Gozyuger vs. Boonboomger ====
No.1 Sentai Gozyuger vs. Boonboomger (ナンバーワン戦隊ゴジュウジャーVSブンブンジャー, Nanbā Wan Sentai Gojūjā Tai Bunbunjā) is a V-Cinema release that features a crossover between No.1 Sentai Gozyuger and Bakuage Sentai Boonboomger. The V-Cinema received a limited theatrical release on March 20, 2026, followed by its DVD and Blu-ray release on July 29, 2026. The events of the film take place after the end of the series. Masaki Nakao, Ryota Ozawa and Mitsuomi Takahashi also reprise their respective roles as Yamato Kazakiri/Zyuoh Eagle from Doubutsu Sentai Zyuohger, Captain Marvelous/Gokai Red from Kaizoku Sentai Gokaiger and Satoru Akashi/Bouken Red from GoGo Sentai Boukenger.

== Cast ==
- Yamato Kazakiri (風切 大和, Kazakiri Yamato): Masaki Nakao (中尾 暢樹, Nakao Masaki)
- Sela (セラ, Sera): Miki Yanagi (柳 美稀, Yanagi Miki)
- Leo (レオ, Reo): Shohei Nanba (南羽 翔平, Nanba Shōhei)
- Tusk (タスク, Tasuku): Tsurugi Watanabe (渡邉 剣, Watanabe Tsurugi)
- Amu (アム): Haruka Tateishi (立石 晴香, Tateishi Haruka)
- Misao Mondo (門藤 操, Mondō Misao): Naoki Kunishima (國島 直希, Kunishima Naoki)
- Bud (バド, Bado),Bird Man (鳥男, Toriotoko): Kohei Murakami (村上 幸平, Murakami Kōhei)
- Mario Mori (森 真理夫, Mori Mario): Susumu Terajima (寺島 進, Terajima Susumu)

=== Voice cast ===
- Larry (ラリー, Rarī): Unshō Ishizuka (石塚 運昇, Ishizuka Unshō)
- Rhino Man (犀男, Sai-otoko): Volcano Ōta (ボルケーノ太田, Borukēno Ōta)
- Crocodile Man (鰐男, Wani-otoko): Mitsuaki Kanuka (かぬか 光明, Kanuka Mitsuaki)
- Wolf Man (狼男, Ōkami-otoko): Hidenori Takahashi (高橋 英則, Takahashi Hidenori)
- Azald (アザルド, Azarudo): Jouji Nakata (中田 譲治, Nakata Jōji)
- Quval (クバル, Kubaru): Mitsuo Iwata (岩田 光央, Iwata Mitsuo)
- Jagd (ジャグド, Jagudo): Eiji Takemoto (竹本 英史, Takemoto Eiji)
- Bangray (バングレイ, Bangurei): Nobutoshi Canna (神奈 延年, Kanna Nobutoshi))
- Naria (ナリア): Minako Kotobuki (寿 美菜子, Kotobuki Minako)
- Ginis (ジニス, Jinisu): Kazuhiko Inoue (井上 和彦, Inoue Kazuhiko)
- Narrator, Zyuohger Equipment, Cetus (ケタス, Ketasu; 28): Chō (チョー)

=== Guest cast ===
- Takeru Tenkūji (天空寺 タケル, Tenkūji Takeru; 7): Shun Nishime (西銘 駿, Nishime Shun)
- Yurusen (ユルセン; Voice; 7): Aoi Yūki (悠木 碧, Yūki Aoi)
- Genkuro Oiwa (大岩 源九郎, Ōiwa Genkurō; 12): Masami Horiuchi (堀内 正美, Horiuchi Masami)
- Yuri Igarashi (五十嵐 百合, Igarashi Yuri; 13): Sayuri Inoue (井上 小百合, Inoue Sayuri; of Nogizaka46)
- Kazuhiro Fuwa (不破 数宏, Fuwa Kazuhiro; 14): Seiya Osada (長田 成哉, Osada Seiya)
- Marin Fuwa (不破 まりん, Fuwa Marin; 14): Ayana Shiramoto (白本 彩奈, Shiramoto Ayana)
- Kento (健斗, Kento; 17): Kenshiro Kato (加藤 憲史郎, Katō Kenshiro)
- Captain Marvelous (キャプテン・マーベラス, Kyaputen Māberasu; 28–29): Ryota Ozawa (小澤 亮太, Ozawa Ryōta)
- Joe Gibken (ジョー・ギブケン, Jō Gibuken; 28–29): Yuki Yamada (山田 裕貴, Yamada Yūki)
- Luka Millfy (ルカ・ミルフィ, Ruka Mirufi; 28–29): Mao Ichimichi (市道 真央, Ichimichi Mao)
- Don Dogoier (ドン･ドッゴイヤー, Don Doggoiyā; 28–29): Kazuki Shimizu (清水 一希, Shimizu Kazuki)
- Ahim de Famille (アイム・ド・ファミーユ, Aimu do Famīyu; 28–29): Yui Koike (小池 唯, Koike Yui)
- Gai Ikari (伊狩 鎧, Ikari Gai; 28–29): Junya Ikeda (池田 純矢, Ikeda Jun'ya)
- Navi (ナビィ, Nabyi; Voice; 28–29): Yukari Tamura (田村 ゆかり, Tamura Yukari)
- Mobilate Voice (28–29): Tomokazu Seki (関 智一, Seki Tomokazu)
- Boy (38): Hikari Tobita (飛田 光里, Tobita Hikari)
- Rei (零; 39): Hiroaki Iwanaga (岩永 洋昭, Iwanaga Hiroaki)
- Kageyuki Kazakiri (風切 景幸, Kazakiri Kageyuki; 42, 45-48): Tomiyuki Kunihiro (国広 富之, Kunihiro Tomiyuki)
- Reporter (43): Minase Yashiro (八代 みなせ, Yashiro Minase)

== Songs ==
Opening theme

- "Doubutsu Sentai Zyuohger" (動物戦隊ジュウオウジャー, Dōbutsu Sentai Jūōjā)
  - Lyrics: Shoko Fujibayashi (藤林 聖子, Fujibayashi Shōko)
  - Composition: Hideaki Takatori
  - Arrangement: Hiroaki Kagoshima (籠島 裕昌, Kagoshima Hiroaki) (Project.R)
  - Artist: Hideaki Takatori (高取 ヒデアキ, Takatori Hideaki) (Project.R)
  - Instruments: Zetki (Z旗, Zettoki)
  - Chorus: Young Fresh (ヤング・フレッシュ, Yangu Furesshu)

Ending themes

- "Let's! Zyuoh Dance" (レッツ! ジュウオウダンス, Rettsu! Jūō Dansu)
  - Lyrics: Shoko Fujibayashi
  - Composition & Arrangement: Takayoshi Tanimoto (谷本 貴義, Tanimoto Takayoshi) (Project.R)
  - Artist: Yohei Onishi (大西 洋平, Ōnishi Yōhei) (Project.R)
  - Chorus: Young Fresh
  - Episodes: 1–27, 30–47
- "Super Sentai Hero Getter 2016" (スーパー戦隊ヒーローゲッター2016, Sūpā Sentai Hīrō Gettā Nisenjūroku)
  - Lyrics: Shoko Fujibayashi, Naruhisa Arakawa (荒川 稔久, Arakawa Naruhisa)
  - Composition & Arrangement: Kenichiro Ohishi (大石 憲一郎, Ōishi Ken'ichirō) (Project.R)
  - Artist: Project.R
  - Instruments: Zetki
  - Episodes: 28–29
- "Let's! Zyuoh Dance Extra Whale Edition" (レッツ! ジュウオウダンス エクストラ・ホエールエディション, Rettsu! Jūō Dansu Ekusutora Hoēru Edishon)
  - Lyrics: Shoko Fujibayashi
  - Composition & Arrangement: Takayoshi Tanimoto (Project.R)
  - Artist: Yohei Onishi (Project.R)
  - Chorus: Young Fresh
  - Episodes: 48
