= Tsurugi Watanabe =

Japanese actor and entertainer (born 1996)

- 渡邉 剣
- Born: July 16, 1996 (age 29); Fukuoka Prefecture, Japan
- Occupations: Actor, entertainer
- Years active: 2014 - 2018
- Agent: Hori Agency
- Known for: Doubutsu Sentai Zyuohger; Call of Duty: Black Ops 3 advertisement
- Height: 178 cm (5 ft 10 in)
- Website: Official profile

Tsurugi Watanabe (渡邉 剣, Watanabe Tsurugi; born July 16, 1996, in Fukuoka Prefecture, Japan) is a Japanese actor and entertainer who was represented by Hori Agency.

== Biography ==
In 2014, Tsurugi was a finalist in the 27th Junon Super Boy Contest. He later signed to Hori Agency. Since February 2016, he has made regular appearances in Doubutsu Sentai Zyuohger as Tusk (Zyuoh Elephant).

== Filmography ==
=== TV series ===
Year	Title	Role	Network	Notes
2016	Doubutsu Sentai Zyuohger	Tusk / Zyuoh Elephant	TV Asahi	

=== Advertisements ===
Year	Title	Notes
2015	PlayStation 3/PlayStation 4 Call of Duty: Black Ops 3	

=== Film ===
Year	Title	Role	Notes
2016	Shuriken Sentai Ninninger vs. ToQger the Movie: Ninja in Wonderland	Zyuoh Elephant	voice
2016	Doubutsu Sentai Zyuohger the Movie: The Exciting Circus Panic!	Tusk/Zyuoh Elephant	
2017	Doubutsu Sentai Zyuohger vs. Ninninger the Movie: Super Sentai's Message from the Future	Tusk/Zyuoh Elephant	
2017	Kamen Rider × Super Sentai: Ultra Super Hero Taisen	Zyuoh Elephant	Voice
2017	Doubutsu Sentai Zyuohger Returns: Give Me Your Life! Earth Champion Tournament	Tusk/Zyuoh Elephant	
2018	Does the Flower Blossom?	Yōichi Mizukawa	Lead role

=== Video game ===
Year	Title	Role	Notes
2016	Doubutsu Sentai Zyuohger: Battle Cube Puzzle	Tusk/Zyuoh Elephant	Nintendo 3DS
