= Minako Kotobuki =

Japanese voice actress

- 寿 美菜子
- Kotobuki at the HoneyWorks Premium Live in 2021
- Born: September 17, 1991 (age 35); Kobe, Hyōgo Prefecture, Japan
- Occupations: Actress; voice actress; singer
- Years active: 2005–present
- Agent: Music Ray'n
- Height: 158 cm (5 ft 2 in)
- Spouse: Undisclosed (m. 2023)
- Musical career
- Genres: J-pop; Anison
- Instruments: Vocals; keyboard
- Years active: 2009–present
- Label: Sony Music Entertainment Japan / Music Ray'n
- Member of: Sphere
- Website: www.kotobukiminako.com

Signature
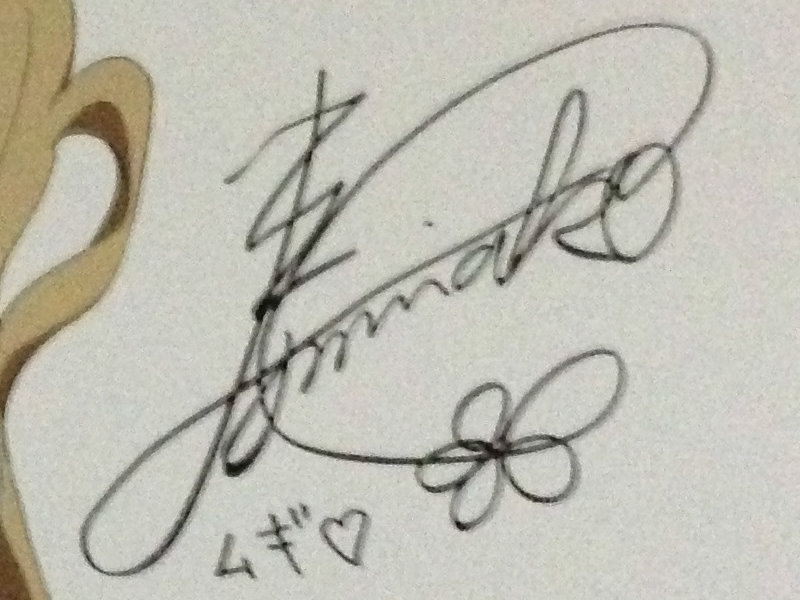

Minako Kotobuki (寿 美菜子, Kotobuki Minako; born September 17, 1991) is a Japanese actress and singer. She played Tsumugi Kotobuki in the anime series K-On! about a high school girl band. The show launched her music career as she performed the opening and ending themes, and joined three other voice actresses as the music group Sphere.

== Acting career ==
At the age of three years, Kotobuki, along with her parents, was caught up in the Great Hanshin earthquake. Not long after having seen a 1997 Japanese film entitled Chikyuu ga Ugoita Hi ("The Day the Earth Moved"), all of these events inspired Kotobuki to pursue her career as a voice actress.

Kotobuki played Tsumugi Kotobuki in K-On!, Karina Lyle/Blue Rose in Tiger & Bunny, Mizuki Kanzaki in Aikatsu!, Rikka Hishikawa/Cure Diamond in DokiDoki! PreCure, Mitsuko Kongō in A Certain Magical Index and A Certain Scientific Railgun, Yūko Nishi in A Channel, Lana and Cia from Hyrule Warriors, Natsumi Aizawa in Natsuiro Kiseki, Touko Nanami in Bloom Into You, Asuka Tanaka in Hibike! Euphonium and Yoriko Fukase in A Whisker Away.

== Music career ==
Kotobuki performed the opening and ending themes of the 2009 anime series K-On!, alongside Aki Toyosaki, Yōko Hikasa, Satomi Satō and Ayana Taketatsu. She performed the opening theme for Hatsukoi Limited series, with Aki Toyosaki, Ayahi Takagaki and Haruka Tomatsu. The four are affiliated with Music Ray'n, an artist management and publishing group of Sony Music Entertainment. They are currently known as the musical group Sphere and released their first single, "Future Stream", on April 22, 2009.

Coupled with the release of her first album My Stride, Kotobuki had her first solo Japan-wide concert tour entitled Our Stride in 2012 spanning across four dates and venues starting from November 18 in Kobe's International House Kokusai Hall and ending on December 9 in Ōmiya's Sonic City Hall.

Kotobuki is said to be "the fastest learner on how to dance" among her peers as far as her being a member of Sphere goes so much that she even guides the other three members of Sphere on dancing. Even in singing, Kotobuki is said to learn just as fast, "a pro in harmonization" according to her fellow castmate in K-On!, Satomi Satō, and "someone who has good sense in pitch" according to one of K-On's staff members in charge of music.

During her stint in both seasons for K-On!, she and her fellow cast members were involved in two live events, and just like the character she portrayed in K-On!, she was in charge of playing the keyboard in both occasions. She also played the keyboard on some of her own songs during her Our Stride solo concert tour and on Sphere's first 2013 live event, Music Rainbow 02. She also participated in the anime series Aikatsu! and was the voice actress of Kanzaki Mizuki.

== Personal life ==
On July 24, 2023, Kotobuki announced her marriage to a man outside of the entertainment industry.

== Filmography ==
=== Live-action film ===
2005

- Hibi – Young Kumiko Kamiyama

2006

- Ghost of Yesterday – Fumiko
- Koufuku no Switch – Young Hitomi
- Hinami – Mina, Satsuki

2008

- Bluebird – Michiru
- -x- (Minus Kakeru Minus) – Rin Fujimoto

2013

- Schoolgirl Complex: Broadcasting Club Edition – Ikumi Motonishi (School teacher)

2014

- Kiki's Delivery Service – Jiji
- Onodera no Otōto, Onodera no Ane – Asako Saitō

2019

- Brave Father Online: Our Story of Final Fantasy XIV – Aru-chan (voice)

=== Anime series ===
2006

- Red Garden – Student C, Grace A

2007

- Kamichama Karin – Kirika (age 5)

2008

- Kyōran Kazoku Nikki – Hijiri Yamaguchi
- Birdy the Mighty: Decode – Kanae Kitamura

2009

- First Love Limited – Rika Dobashi
- K-On! – Tsumugi Kotobuki
- Umi Monogatari: Anata ga Ite Kureta Koto – Kanon Miyamori
- A Certain Scientific Railgun – Mitsuko Kongou
- Modern Magic Made Simple – Kaho Sakazaki
- Hell Girl: Triangle – Kaname Shimura
- Sora no Manimani – Emiri, Youko Matoba, Hachiman, Sayaka Akiyama
- Birdy the Mighty: Decode 02 – Kanae Kitamura, Mirun
- Heaven's Lost Property – Tsukino Hououin
- Guin Saga – Alumina

2010

- Cat Planet Cuties – Chaika
- Chu-Bra!! – Yako Jingūji
- Hyakka Ryōran – Sen Tokugawa
- K-On!! – Tsumugi Kotobuki
- B Gata H Kei – Additional Voices
- Otome Yōkai Zakuro – Daidai
- Mayoi Neko Overrun! – Young Takumi
- Lilpri – Tenko Okamoto
- Ōkami-san and Her Seven Companions – Chuutarou Nezumi
- A Certain Magical Index II – Mitsuko Kongou
- Demon King Daimao – Arnoul
- The Legend of the Legendary Heroes – Naia Knolles (Kiefer's sister)
- Yumeiro Patissiere – Dominic

2011

- A Channel – Yūko Nishi
- Coicent (OVA) – Toto
- Guilty Crown – Kanon Kusama
- Dog Days – Vert Far Breton
- Manyu Scroll – Chifusa Manyū
- Ro-Kyu-Bu! – Natsuhi Takenaka
- Softenni – Misaki Shidou
- Tiger & Bunny – Karina Lyle/Blue Rose
- Hanasaku Iroha – Eri Mizuno
- Tamayura: Hitotose – Chihiro Miyoshi
- Beelzebub – Yolda, Kaoru Umemiya
- Wandering Son – Kobayashi
- Horizon in the Middle of Nowhere – Gin Tachibana
- Un-Go – Sayo Izawa

2012

- Natsuiro Kiseki: Natsumi Aizawa
- Mobile Suit Gundam AGE – Fram Nara
- Medaka Box – Nekomi Nabeshima
- Medaka Box Abnormal – Nekomi Nabeshima
- Dog Days` – Vert Far Breton
- Aikatsu! – Mizuki Kanzaki
- Inazuma Eleven Go: Chrono Stone – Jeanne d'Arc
- Hyouka – Henmi
- Tari Tari – Youko Mizuno
- Say I Love You – Megumi Kitagawa
- Sket Dance – Akina
- Queen's Blade Rebellion – Izumi
- Horizon in the Middle of Nowhere II – Gin Tachibana, Matsu
- Pokémon: Black & White – Stella

2013

- DokiDoki! PreCure – Rikka Hishikawa/Cure Diamond
- Hyakka Ryōran Samurai Bride – Sen Tokugawa
- A Certain Scientific Railgun S – Mitsuko Kongou
- My Youth Romantic Comedy Is Wrong, as I Expected – Minami Sagami
- Valvrave the Liberator – Takahi Ninomiya
- Tamayura: More Aggressive – Chihiro Miyoshi
- Ro-Kyu-Bu! SS – Natsuhi Takenaka
- Yuushibu – Herself

2014

- Go! Go! 575 – Yuzu Yosano
- Saki: Zenkoku-hen – Kyōko Suehara
- Sekai Seifuku: Bōryaku no Zvezda – Miki Shirasagi/White Egret
- Baby Steps – Natsu Takasaki
- Pokémon XY – Ellie
- Majin Bone – Tomoko Ryūjin
- Gundam Reconguista in G – Noredo Nug
- Robot Girls Z – Imaichi Moenai Ko (Girl lacking in moe)
- Girl Friend Beta – Saya Kagurazaka
- Terra Formars – Rosa (Adolf's ex-wife)

2015

- Baby Steps Season 2 – Natsu Takasaki
- Dog Days`` – Vert Far Breton
- Sound! Euphonium – Asuka Tanaka
- Punch Line – Ito Hikiotani
- The Seven Deadly Sins – Vivian
- Your Lie in April – Izumi
- Tokyo Ghoul √A – Ukina
- Akagami no Shirayukihime – Actress (ep 12)
- Kamisama Minarai: Himitsu no Cocotama – Konoka Yamada

2016

- Time Travel Girl – Waka Mizuki
- Ange Vierge – Saya Sōgetsu
- Sound! Euphonium 2 – Asuka Tanaka
- Berserk – Rickert

2017

- Case Closed – Eiko Ikeguchi (ep. 859)
- Bungo Stray Dogs OVA – Aya
- Re:Creators – Shunma Suruga
- Akashic Records of Bastard Magic Instructor – Sera Silvers
- Senki Zesshō Symphogear AXZ – Saint-Germain
- Aikatsu Stars! – Mizuki Kanzaki (ep 70)

2018

- Bloom Into You – Tōko Nanami

2019

- Fairy Gone – "Sweety" Bitter Sweet
- 7 Seeds – Maria Miki
- Senki Zesshō Symphogear XV – Saint-Germain
- Aikatsu on Parade! – Mizuki Kanzaki

2020

- A Certain Scientific Railgun T – Mitsuko Kongō

2021

- Idoly Pride – Ai Komiyama

2022

- Detective Conan – Mina Katsumata
- Love All Play – Rika Mizushima
- Tiger & Bunny 2 – Karina Lyle/Blue Rose
- Fanfare of Adolescence – Miku Kashino
- Legend of Mana: The Teardrop Crystal – Sandra

2023

- Pokémon: Paldean Winds – Aliquis

2024

- Tower of God 2nd Season – Khun Ran
- Sound! Euphonium 3 – Asuka Tanaka

2026

- Botan Kamiina Fully Blossoms When Drunk – Kanade Gujō
- Kusunoki's Garden of Gods – Torika
- Sparks of Tomorrow – Noriko Momokawa
- Fool Night – Yomiko Horai

2027

- LONA – Ao

=== Anime films ===
2009

- Redline – Hime

2011

- K-On! The Movie – Tsumugi Kotobuki
- Towa no Quon – Cyborg Delta AKA Hizuru Asuka
- Heaven's Lost Property the Movie: The Angeloid of Clockwork – Tsukino Hououin

2012

- Pokémon the Movie: Black—Victini and Reshiram and White—Victini and Zekrom – Yorterrie
- Fuse Teppō Musume no Torimonochō – Hamaji
- Berserk Golden Age Arc I: The Egg of the King – Rickert
- Berserk Golden Age Arc II: The Battle for Doldrey – Rickert
- After School Midnighters – Mutsuko
- Tiger & Bunny: The Beginning – Karina Lyle/Blue Rose

2013

- A Certain Magical Index: The Movie – The Miracle of Endymion – Mitsuko Kongou
- Berserk Golden Age Arc III: Descent – Rickert
- Dokidoki! PreCure the Movie: Mana's Getting Married!!? The Dress of Hope Tied to the Future – Rikka Hishikawa/Cure Diamond
- Pretty Cure All Stars New Stage 2: Kokoro no Tomodachi – Rikka Hishikawa/Cure Diamond

2014

- Tiger & Bunny: The Rising – Karina Lyle/Blue Rose
- Pretty Cure All Stars New Stage 3: Eien no Tomodachi – Rikka Hishikawa/Cure Diamond
- Aikatsu!: The Movie – Mizuki Kanzaki

2015

- Cyborg 009 Vs. Devilman – Eva Maria Parallels
- Tamayura: Sotsugyou Shashin – Chihiro Miyoshi

2017

- Lu Over the Wall – Yuho Ebina

2018

- Flavors of Youth – Yi Lin

2019

- Sound! Euphonium: The Movie – Our Promise: A Brand New Day – Asuka Tanaka
- Violet Evergarden: Eternity and the Auto Memory Doll – Isabella York
- Hello World – Yiyi Xu

2020

- A Whisker Away – Yoriko Fukase

2023

- The Concierge at Hokkyoku Department Store – Sea Mink (Daughter)

2024

- My Hero Academia: You're Next – Deborah Gorrini
- The Colors Within – Sumika Yatsushika

=== Video games ===
2004

- Mega Man – Cinnamon

2009

- Final Fantasy XIII (PS3) – Serah Farron

2010

- K-On! Houkago Live!! (PSP) – Tsumugi Kotobuki
- Suzunone Seven! ~Rebirth Knot~ (PS2) – Mayo Shouno

2011

- Final Fantasy Type-0 (PSP) – Kasumi Tobuki
- Final Fantasy XIII-2 (PS3) – Serah Farron
- Ro-Kyu-Bu! (PSP) – Natsuhi Takenaka
- A Certain Magical Index (PSP) – Mitsuko Kongou

2012

- Devil Summoner: Soul Hackers (3DS) – Hitomi Tono, Nemissa
- YomeColle (Smartphone game) – Chifusa Manyū
- Girl Friend Beta (Smartphone game) – Saya Kagurazaka
- Mobile Suit Gundam AGE: Universe Accel / Cosmic Drive (PSP) – Fram Nara

2013

- Tiger & Bunny: Heroes' Day (PSP) – Karina Lyle/Blue Rose
- Horizon in the Middle of Nowhere Portable (PSP) – Gin Tachibana
- Lightning Returns: Final Fantasy XIII (PS3) – Serah Farron
- Aikatsu! Futari No My Princess (3DS) – Mizuki Kanzaki

2014

- Ro-Kyu-Bu!: Naisho no Shutter Chance (Vita) – Natsuhi Takenaka
- Suzunone Seven! Portable (PSP) – Mayo Shouno
- Hyrule Warriors (Wii U) – Lana, Cia
- Granblue Fantasy (Android, iOS, Browser) – Herja
- Grimoire 〜Shiritsu Grimoire Mahou Gakuen〜 (Smartphone game) – Senri Wagatsuma
- Heroes Placement (Smartphone game) – Obana Tonomine
- Aikatsu! 365 Idol Days (3DS) – Mizuki Kanzaki

2015

- Persona 4: Dancing All Night (Vita) – Kanami Mashita
- Girl Friend Note (Smartphone rhythm game) – Saya Kagurazaka
- Hyrule Warriors – Lana/Cia
- Super Robot Wars BX – Fram Nara

2016

- Hyrule Warriors Legends (3DS) – Lana, Cia
- Aikatsu! Photo on Stage (Smartphone game) – Mizuki Kanzaki
- Schoolgirl Strikers (Smartphone game) – Monica
- Punch Line – Ito Hikiotani
- Berserk and the Band of the Hawk (Multiple platforms) – Rickert

2017

- Oshiro Project:RE – Tokugawa Osaka-jo
- Precure Tsunagaru Pazurun – Rikka Hishikawa/Cure Diamond
- Kirara Fantasia – Tsumugi Kotobuki, Yuuko

2018

- Super Robot Wars X – Noredo Nug

2019

- Gundam Extreme VS. 2 – Fram Nara, Noredo Nug

2021

- Idoly Pride – Ai Komiyama

2023

- Arknights – Qiu Bai

=== Tokusatsu ===
2016

- Doubutsu Sentai Zyuohger – Nalia
- Doubutsu Sentai Zyuohger the Movie: The Exciting Circus Panic! – Nalia

2017

- Doubutsu Sentai Zyuohger vs. Ninninger the Movie: Super Sentai's Message from the Future – Nalia
- Doubutsu Sentai Zyuohger Returns: Give Me Your Life! Earth Champion Tournament – Nalia

=== Theater ===
2014

- Tanin no Me – Belinda
- Eclipse – Hanezu, Young Seimei

=== Overseas dubbing ===
==== Live-action ====
- Big Little Lies – Jane Chapman (Shailene Woodley)
- Byzantium – Eleanor Webb (Saoirse Ronan)
- Carrie – Nikki and Lizzi (Karissa and Katie Strain)
- The Edge of Seventeen – Nadine Franklin (Hailee Steinfeld)
- Gossip Girl – Ivy Dickens / Charlie Rhodes (Kaylee DeFer)
- Hick – Luli McMullen (Chloë Grace Moretz)
- I.T. – Kaitlyn Regan (Stefanie Scott)
- Les Misérables – Cosette (Ellie Bamber)
- Mindscape – Anna Greene (Taissa Farmiga)
- The Pillars of the Earth – Elizabeth (Skye Lourie)
- Priest – Lucy (Lily Collins)
- Safe – Mei (Catherine Chan)
- Stuber – Nicole Manning (Natalie Morales)
- Sucker Punch – Babydoll (Emily Browning)
- We Are Lady Parts – Amina (Anjana Vasan)
- The Winchesters – Latika "Lata" Desai (Nida Khurshid)

==== Animation ====
- Helluva Boss – Beelzebub
- How to Train Your Dragon – Astrid Hofferson
- Kpop Demon Hunters – Rumi
- Smurfs: The Lost Village – Smurfstorm
- Thunderbirds Are Go – Tanusha "Kayo" Kyrano

== Discography ==
=== Albums ===
- My Stride (2012)
- Tick (2014)
- Emotion (2018)

=== Singles ===
- "Shiny+" (September 15, 2010)
- "Startline" (November 24, 2010)
- "Dear My..." (September 14, 2011)
- "Kokoro Sky" (April 11, 2012)
- "Prism" (June 19, 2013)
- "Pretty Fever" (November 20, 2013)
- "Believe x" (Believe Cross) (April 16, 2014)
- "Black Hole" (April 8, 2015)
- "Candy Color Pop" (September 16, 2015)
- "Bye Bye Blue" (March 2, 2016)
- "Million Litmus" (December 7, 2016)
- "Save My World" (January 19, 2019)
