= Naoki Kunishima =

Japanese actor and model (born 1994)

- 國島 直希
- Born: August 1, 1994 (age 31); Gifu Prefecture, Japan
- Occupations: Actor, model
- Years active: 2014-present
- Height: 180 cm (5 ft 11 in)
- Website: Official profile

Naoki Kunishima (國島 直希, Kunishima Naoki; born August 1, 1994 in Gifu Prefecture, Japan) is a Japanese actor and model who is affiliated with Ohta Production.

On 2013, Kunishima was the winner of the 26th Junon Super Boy Contest Grand Prix. He made his acting debut in 2014 where he starred in the movie The Werewolf Game: The Beast Side as Yuki Yanagawa. On 2016, Kunishima made his major drama debut in 2016 Super Sentai series Doubutsu Sentai Zyuohger as Misao Mondo/Zyuoh The World.

== Filmography ==
=== TV series ===
Year	Title	Role	Network	Notes
2016	Doubutsu Sentai Zyuohger	Misao Mondo / Zyuoh The World	TV Asahi	Lead role
2018	Mob Psycho 100	Shinji Kamuro	TV Tokyo/Netflix	Supporting role

=== Film ===
Year	Title	Role	Notes
2014	The Werewolf Game: The Beast Side	Yuki Yanagawa	
2016	Doubutsu Sentai Zyuohger the Movie: The Exciting Circus Panic!	Misao Mondo/Zyuoh The World	
2017	Doubutsu Sentai Zyuohger vs. Ninninger the Movie: Super Sentai's Message from the Future	Misao Mondo/Zyuoh The World	
2017	Kamen Rider × Super Sentai: Ultra Super Hero Taisen	Zyuoh The World	voice role
2017	Doubutsu Sentai Zyuohger Returns: Give Me Your Life! Earth Champion Tournament	Zyuoh The World	
2018	You Are the Apple of My Eye	Kento Machida	Supporting role
2019	Lupinranger VS Patranger VS Kyuranger	Misao Mondo/Zyuoh The World	

=== Stage ===
Year	Title	Role	Notes
2019	Identity V Stage Episode 1: What to Draw	Xie Bi'an	
2020	Identity V Stage Episode 3: Cry for the Moon	Xie Bi'an	
2021	Identity V Stage Episode 2: Double Down	Xie Bi'an	
2024	Musical Touken Ranbu: ~Michi no Oku Hitotsu wa Chisu~	Ichigo Hitofuri	
2024	Identity V Stage Episode 4: Phantom of the Monochrome	Xie Bi'an	
2024	7 Seeds: Spring Chapter	Haru Yukima	

=== Video game ===
Year	Title	Role	Notes
2016	Doubutsu Sentai Zyuohger: Battle Cube Puzzle	Misao Mondo/Zyuoh The World	Nintendo DS
