= Shohei Nanba =

Japanese actor (born 1991)

- 南羽 翔平
- Born: February 2, 1991 (age 35); Okayama Prefecture, Japan
- Occupation: Actor
- Years active: 2010—2018
- Agent: Box Corporation
- Known for: Musical Nintama Rantarō; Tengoku no Koi
- Height: 177 cm (5 ft 10 in)
- Website: http://www.box-corporation.com/?portfolios=南羽翔平

Shohei Nanba (南羽 翔平, Nanba Shōhei; born February 2, 1991, in Okayama Prefecture, Japan) is a Japanese actor who was represented by Box Corporation.

== Biography ==
When participating a three-year open campus in high school in Tokyo, Nanba received a scout from his former office.

On 2010, his acting debut was in Kamen Rider W.

On 2011, Nanba appeared on the stage show, Musical Nintama Rantarō as Senzo Tachibana starting from the second series. He appeared in the third installment of the same work, and appeared for three years until the fourth series.

Nanba's hobbies are jogging and watching films and his skills are kendo, calligraphy, backflips, and handstands. He did kendo in elementary school in two years to high school in three years.

Up until the first half of 2018, Nanba was still active in the entertainment industry. After February 2018, nothing has been heard from him ever since. His profile was subsequently removed from the Box Corporation website.

== Filmography ==
=== Stage ===
Year	Title	Role	Notes
2011	Musical Nintama Rantarō	Senzo Tachibana	
2015	Yazuka	Ikki	
2015	Sengoku Basara	Virgil	

=== Drama ===
Year	Title	Role	Network	Notes
2010	Kamen Rider W	Endo	TV Asahi	Episode 49
2010	Atsui zo! Nekogaya!!	Satoshi Hidaka	NBN	
2011	Asukō March: Asuka Kōgyō Kōkō Monogatari		TV Asahi	
2012	Misa Yamamura Suspense		Fuji TV	
2012	Shiritsu Bakaleya Koukou		NTV	Episode 4
2012	Hōkago wa Mystery to Tomoni	Yuji Mishima	TBS	
2012	Switch Girl!! 2		Fuji TV Two	Episodes 3 to 5
2013	Tengoku no Koi	Mizuhiko Ebihara (adolescent)	THN	
2015	Jona Sanpo 2	Hirose	NHK E TV	Episode 1
2016	Doubutsu Sentai Zyuohger	Leo / Zyuoh Lion	TV Asahi	Leading role

=== Variety series ===
Year	Title	Network	Notes
2013	Hōgen Kareshi	Higashimeihan Net 6, Hikari TV Channel	

=== Films ===
Year	Title	Role	Notes
2010	Sankanshion		
2011	High School Debut	Basketball staff	
2013	Ikenie no Dilemma	Yuta Aizawa	
2014	Shi no Jikkyō Chūkei	Yusaku Tachibana	
2015	Oedo no Candy	Nekomaru	
2016	Shuriken Sentai Ninninger vs. ToQger the Movie: Ninja in Wonderland	Zyuoh Lion	Voice
2016	Doubutsu Sentai Zyuohger the Movie: The Exciting Circus Panic!	Leo/Zyuoh Lion	
2017	Doubutsu Sentai Zyuohger vs. Ninninger the Movie: Super Sentai's Message from the Future	Leo/Zyuoh Lion	
2017	Kamen Rider × Super Sentai: Ultra Super Hero Taisen	Zyuoh Lion	Voice
2017	Doubutsu Sentai Zyuohger Returns: Give Me Your Life! Earth Champion Tournament	Leo/Zyuoh Lion	

=== Video game ===
Year	Title	Role	Notes
2016	Doubutsu Sentai Zyuohger: Battle Cube Puzzle	Leo/Zyuoh Lion	Nintendo 3DS
