= Nekodamashi =

Sumo technique

Nekodamashi (猫騙し, ねこだまし) is a distraction technique in the sport of sumo wrestling, literally translating to "fool-the-cat trick". At the start of the bout (tachi-ai), a wrestler claps his hands in front of his opponent's face, causing him to blink. It is a way for smaller wrestlers to gain an advantage, allowing them to jump behind a larger and stronger opponent, or dive in more closely.

Nekodamashi requires there to be a fair amount of space between the wrestlers at the tachi-ai. Using the technique is also a gamble: if it miscarries, it leaves the wrestler wide open to his opponent's attack.

Nekodamashi is not listed as a kimarite (winning technique); even in the unlikely situation that a wrestler is so surprised by a nekodamashi that he falls over, the winning technique is simply recorded as higi (non-technique victory).

Famous sumo wrestlers to have used the nekodamashi over the years include Mainoumi, Ōtsukasa, yokozuna Hakuhō in November 2015, and former yokozuna Mienoumi.

== See also ==
- Glossary of sumo terms
