= Masaki Nakao =

Japanese actor and entertainer (born 1996)

- 中尾 暢樹
- Born: November 27, 1996 (age 29); Saitama Prefecture, Japan
- Occupations: Actor, entertainer
- Years active: 2014–present
- Agent: Watanabe Entertainment
- Known for: Doubutsu Sentai Zyuohger as Yamato Kazakiri (Zyuoh Eagle); Au "Au Smart Pass"
- Website: Official profile

Masaki Nakao (中尾 暢樹, Nakao Masaki; born November 27, 1996, in Saitama Prefecture, Japan) is a Japanese actor and entertainer who is represented by Watanabe Entertainment. He is known for his role as Yamato Kazakiri/Zyuoh Eagle in the 40th entry of the Super Sentai series, Doubutsu Sentai Zyuohger.

== Biography ==
Masaki Nakao was born in Saitama Prefecture on November 27, 1996.

On 2016, Nakao made his drama debut in 2016 Super Sentai series Doubutsu Sentai Zyuohger as the protagonist, Yamato Kazakiri (Zyuoh Eagle).

== Filmography ==
=== TV series ===
Year	Title	Role	Notes	Ref.
2018	Koe Girl!	Katsutoshi Masada		
2019	Your Turn to Kill	Ryō Kakinuma		
2022	Accomplishment of Fudanshi Bartender	Yamazaki	Episode 1	
2022	KabeKoji	Issei Kazama	Lead role	
2025	Masked Ninja Akakage	Ishida Mitsunari		

=== Film ===
Year	Title	Role	Notes	Ref.
2017	Make a Bow and Kiss	Yōta Mikami	Lead role	
2021	Your Turn to Kill: The Movie	Ryō Kakinuma		
2022	The Master Sake Brewers			

=== Stage plays ===
Year	Title	Role	Notes	Ref.
2021	Tokyo Revengers	Atsushi Sendo		
2022	Tokyo Revengers: Bloody Halloween	Atsushi Sendo		
