= List of Ressha Sentai ToQger characters =

Ressha Sentai ToQger (烈車戦隊トッキュウジャー, Ressha Sentai Tokkyūjā) is a Japanese tokusatsu series that serves as the 38th installment in the Super Sentai franchise and the 26th entry in the Heisei era.

== Main characters ==
=== ToQgers ===
The eponymous ToQgers are five children who the Rainbow Line recruited for their imagination and aged up to young adults to stop the Shadow Line from plunging the world into darkness, though they initially lack memories of their past and how they came to be recruited. As the series progresses, the ToQgers eventually learn their imagination saved them when the Shadow Line took over their hometown, Subarugahama (昴ヶ浜), when Zet took notice of Right's inner light. Though Right ended up on a Cryner due to his encounter with Zet while his friends were brought to the Rainbow Line, they work together to defeat the Shadow Line, recover their memories, and return home, even at the potential cost of remaining trapped in their adult forms and being forgotten by their loved ones. Along the way, they are joined by a Shadow Creep who seeks to repent for his sins by dying in battle. Ultimately, the ToQgers succeed in freeing and returning to Subarugahama and are returned to their original ages.

The primary ToQgers transform by utilizing miniature versions of their regular Ressha known as ToQ Ressha (トッキュウレッシャー, Tokkyū Resshā) in conjunction with the railroad crossing-like ToQ Changer (トッキュウチェンジャー, Tokkyū Chenjā) bracelet. While each member has a primary ToQ Ressha with an associated color and weapon, they can also swap them with each other through the Transfer Change (乗り換えチェンジ, Norikae Chenji) process. Additionally, each member carries a ToQ Blaster (トッキュウブラスター, Tokkyū Burasutā) sidearm, which can switch between its handgun-like Uchimasu Mode (ウチマスモード, Uchimasu Mōdo) (Note: Uchimasu (撃ちます) is the Japanese word for "to shoot (a gun).") and its sword-like Kirimasu Mode (キリマスモード, Kirimasu Mōdo), (Note: Kirimasu (切ります) is the Japanese word for "to cut (with a sword).") as well as a Rainbow Pass (レインボーパス, Reinbō Pasu) to board the Ressha. By combining their personal weapons, the ToQgers can form the Renketsu Bazooka (レンケツバズーカ, Renketsu Bazūka) (Note: Renketsu (連結) is the Japanese word for "coupling.") and use it in conjunction with the Energy Ressha (エナジーレッシャー, Enajī Resshā) to perform the Rainbow Rush (レインボーラッシュ, Reinbō Rasshu) finisher.

After acquiring the Hyper Ressha, any one of the ToQgers can utilize it to assume an armored Hyper ToQger (ハイパートッキュウジャー, Haipā Tokkyūjā) form. In this form, they wield the railway turntable-like Daikaiten Cannon (ダイカイテンキャノン, Daikaiten Kyanon), (Note: The name is derived from Dai (大, "Great") and Kaiten (回転, "turning" or "rotation").) which allows them to perform the Hyper Last Train Crash (ハイパー終電クラッシュ, Haipā Shū Den Kurasshu), Hyper 5 Connection Crash (ハイパー5連結クラッシュ, Haipā Go Renketsu Kurasshu), Hyper 4 Connection Crash (ハイパー4連結クラッシュ, Haipā Yon Renketsu Kurasshu), and ToQ Last Train Crash (トッキュウ終電クラッシュ, Tokkyū Shū Den Kurasshu) finishers.

==== Right ====
Raito Suzuki (鈴樹 来斗, Suzuki Raito), also known as Right (ライト, Raito), is a spirited youth who is always facing and rushing forward to seize the joy of life, usually gives it his all, and the type to easily be fired up and go against the odds. Out of the five ToQgers, Right's imagination is the strongest, as he inspires others to believe in what he believes in, often pulling his friends along whether they like it or not. He often acts before he thinks and hates cramped places. Additionally, he is initially the only ToQger with any form of memory of their pasts. In combat, he has a habit of initiating Transfer Changes without asking for permission, often annoying his friends and the Conductor. Later in the series, it is revealed that Right lives with his mother Yumi (優美), grandfather Tsuyoshi (剛史), and younger siblings Mai (舞) and Yuto (優斗, Yūto). He was also accidentally infused with Zet's darkness when Subarugahama was consumed by darkness, which resulted in him ending up in a Cryner instead of the Rainbow Line when the ToQgers were recruited and gradually lose his imagination. Nevertheless, with help from his friends and mother, Right regains his imagination and safely returns to Subarugahama with them.

Right can transform into ToQ 1gou (トッキュウ1号, Tokkyū Ichigō), whose default color is red. While transformed, he primarily wields the Rail Slasher (レールスラッシャー, Rēru Surasshā) sword. Additionally, he can assume the following forms:

- Dark ToQ 1gou (闇のトッキュウ1号, Yami no Tokkyū Ichigō): A black-colored version of Right's ToQger form that he assumes while possessing Zet's darkness at the cost of his imagination.
- Rainbow ToQ 1gou (虹のトッキュウ1号, Niji no Tokkyū Ichigō): A multicolored version of Right's ToQger form accessed from his teammates' personal ToQ Ressha and the Hyper Ressha that he assumes during his final battle with Zet.

Right is portrayed by Jun Shison (志尊 淳, Shison Jun). As a child, he is portrayed by Homare Mabuchi (馬渕 誉, Mabuchi Homare).

==== Tokatti ====
Haru Tokashiki (渡嘉敷 晴, Tokashiki Haru), (Note: The character's name is taken from the Hokkaido Railway Company's Super Tokachi express train.) also known as Tokatti (トカッチ, Tokatchi), is a highly cautious yet clumsy and bookish member of the group who the others befriended when he first moved to Subarugahama. While he is the type that wants to investigate and research first and specializes in analyzing enemies and making plans, he tends to be flighty, overreact to everything, and becomes incessant in regards to results. Additionally, he has trouble with being punctual, thinking on the fly, and improvising due to his deliberate thought processes. Despite these traits, his friends view him as the smartest member of the group, though he personally believes Hikari is smarter than him. Later in the series, it is revealed that Tokatti lives with his parents and older brother Ryo.

Tokatti can transform into ToQ 2gou (トッキュウ2号, Tokkyū Nigō), whose default color is blue. While transformed, he primarily wields the Home Trigger (ホームトリガー, Hōmu Torigā) raygun.

Tokatti is portrayed by Jin Hiramaki (平牧 仁, Hiramaki Jin). As a child, he is portrayed by Keishiro Nagase (永瀬 圭志朗, Nagase Keishirō).

==== Mio ====
Mio Natsume (夏目 美緒, Natsume Mio) is a sporty and tomboyish youth who instinctively cares for others and displays no tolerance for underhanded tactics while hiding the more delicate and romantic aspects of her personality, the latter especially due to being uncomfortable with the idea of romance. Because of this, she is quite popular and had a crush on Tokatti. Later in the series, it is revealed that Mio lives with her father Kohei (公平, Kōhei), who is a police officer.

Mio can transform into ToQ 3gou (トッキュウ3号, Tokkyū Sangō), whose default color is yellow. While transformed, she primarily wields the Signal Hammer (シンゴウハンマー, Shingō Hanmā).

Mio is portrayed by Riria (梨里杏). As a child, she is portrayed by Kaoruko Ishii (石井 薫子, Ishii Kaoruko).

==== Hikari ====
Hikari Nonomura (野々村 洸, Nonomura Hikari) (Note: The character's name is taken from the Hikari service on the Tōkaidō Shinkansen and San'yō Shinkansen.) is an unhurried, quick-witted, and calm youth who often sits alone while his friends are occupied with other matters and serves as Right's foil due to the former's natural fighting instincts, analytical nature, and differing imagination and opinions. Unsociable and unwilling to talk much, Hikari keeps everyone grounded when Right pulls them away and shows both loyalty to Mio and a tendency to tease Kagura. Additionally, despite Tokatti's belief that Hikari is the smartest member of the team, the latter does not display this side of himself often. Later in the series, it is revealed that Hikari lives with his grandmother Emiko (恵美子) since his mother Ayaka (彩香) is busy with work.

Hikari can transform into ToQ 4gou (トッキュウ4号, Tokkyū Yongō), whose default color is green. While transformed, he primarily wields the Tunnel Axe (トンネルアックス, Tonneru Akkusu).

Hikari is portrayed by Ryusei Yokohama (横浜 流星, Yokohama Ryūsei). As a child, he is portrayed by Hikaru Yamazaki (山﨑 光, Yamazaki Hikaru).

==== Kagura ====
Kagura Izumi (泉 神楽, Izumi Kagura) is a young girl who possesses the second-most powerful imagination, which often causes unforeseen events to occur and allows her to grant herself superhuman traits with enough focus, but is hampered by her simplicity, severe self-doubt, lack of fighting capability, and over-excitement, the last of which causes her to trade self-restraint for overwhelming yet uncontrollable power. Later in the series, it is revealed that Kagura lives with her parents Yosuke (洋介, Yōsuke) and Keiko (恵子) and baby brother Daiki (大喜).

Kagura can transform into ToQ 5gou (トッキュウ5号, Tokkyū Gogō), whose default color is pink. While transformed, she primarily wields the Bridge Claw (テッキョウクロー, Tekkyō Kurō).

Kagura is portrayed by Ai Moritaka (森高 愛, Moritaka Ai). As a child, she is portrayed by Rara Shimizu (清水 らら, Shimizu Rara).

==== Akira Nijino ====
Akira Nijino (虹野 明, Nijino Akira) is a Rainbow Line railway worker who was originally Shadow Line member and General Schwarz's comrade, Zaram (ザラム, Zaramu). (Note: Zaram's name comes from the Arabic word for dark: ẓalām.) Possessing the power to cause rain, Zaram believed he was capable of great evil until he saw a rainbow, which inspired him to defect to the Rainbow Line and atone for his perceived sins by finding a place worth dying for his newfound cause. Despite renouncing his origins, his power remained.

When the ToQgers learn the Conductor acquired equipment for a sixth ToQger and following an encounter with him, Right chooses Zaram to join them despite learning of his past. Zaram is initially reluctant before eventually being convinced to do so as part of his quest for redemption. Despite this and receiving a human name, Akira does not truly see himself as a ToQger, which leads to him secretly joining forces with a rogue Schwarz to stop Zet and temporarily fighting against the ToQgers. Following Schwarz's death, Akira returns to them after learning that they cherish their friendship with him. As of the V-Cinema They Went and Came Back Again Ressha Sentai ToQger: Super ToQ 7gou of Dreams, Akira discovers his time with the Rainbow Line is gradually making him human.

Unlike the primary ToQgers, Akira utilizes the AppliChanger (アプリチェンジャー, Apurichenjā) smartphone to transform into the orange-colored ToQ 6gou (トッキュウ6号, Tokkyū Rokugō). While transformed, he wields the Guidance Breaker (ユウドウブレイカー, Yūdō Bureikā) baton. Due to his increased power, Akira is unable to initiate Transfer Changes like his teammates.

During the events of the DVD special Ressha Sentai ToQger DVD Special: Farewell, Ticket! The Wasteland Super ToQ Battle!!, Akira acquires the Build Ressha Super ToQ Version (ビルドレッシャー超トッキュウver., Birudo Resshā Chō Tokkyuu Bājon), which allows him to transform into the brightly-colored Super ToQ 6gou (超トッキュウ6号, Chō Tokkyū Rokugō).

Akira Nijino is portrayed by Shin Nagahama (長濱 慎, Nagahama Shin).

=== Ressha ===
The Ressha (烈車) are the ToQgers' train-themed mecha and headquarters that are based on the Rainbow Line. Though they usually answer to the Conductor, the Ressha can be used by the ToQgers to combine together into giant robots via Ressha Combination (烈車合体, Ressha Gattai) and fight enlarged Shadow Creeps.

- Red Ressha (レッドレッシャー, Reddo Resshā): ToQ 1gou's personal steam locomotive-themed Ressha that forms the head and middle torso of ToQ-Oh.
- Blue Ressha (ブルーレッシャー, Burū Resshā): ToQ 2gou's personal Shinkansen-themed Ressha that forms the right torso and right leg of ToQ-Oh.
- Yellow Ressha (イエローレッシャー, Ierō Resshā): ToQ 3gou's personal rapid transit-themed Ressha that forms the right arm of ToQ-Oh.
- Green Ressha (グリーンレッシャー, Gurīn Resshā): ToQ 4gou's personal Shinkansen-themed Ressha that forms the left torso and right leg of ToQ-Oh.
- Pink Ressha (ピンクレッシャー, Pinku Resshā): ToQ 5gou's personal rapid transit-themed Ressha that forms the left arm of ToQ-Oh.
- Build Ressha (ビルドレッシャー, Birudo Resshā): ToQ 6gou's personal Ressha and the strongest Ressha that is equipped with a claw and the Power Crane (パワークレーン, Pawā Kurēn).
- Support Ressha (サポート烈車, Sapōto Ressha): A series of supplementary Ressha that can combine with the ToQgers' giant robots via Ressha Armament (烈車武装, Ressha Busō).
  - Shield Ressha (シールドレッシャー, Shīrudo Resshā): A namesake-themed Ressha capable of combining with ToQ-Oh while in its Signal Shield (シグナルシールド, Shigunaru Shīrudo) mode.
  - Car Carrier Ressha (カーキャリアレッシャー, Kā Kyaria Resshā): An autorack-themed Ressha capable of carrying large items and the tiny Dash Cars (ダッシュカー, Dasshu Kā), and forms the right leg of DieselOh.
  - Tank Ressha (タンクレッシャー, Tanku Resshā): A tank car-themed Ressha that refuels the other Ressha and forms the left leg of DieselOh.
  - Fire Ressha (ファイヤーレッシャー, Faiyā Resshā): A fire engine-themed Ressha that equips the ToQgers' giant robots with the Fire Ladder (ファイヤーラダー, Faiyā Radā) and the Extinguisher Arm (ショウカアーム, Shōka Āmu).
  - Police Ressha (ポリスレッシャー, Porisu Resshā): A police car-themed Ressha that possesses the highest speed among the Ressha and equips the ToQgers' giant robots with the Police Gun (ポリスガン, Porisu Gan) and the Police Wapper (ポリスワッパー, Porisu Wappā).
  - Drill Ressha (ドリルレッシャー, Doriru Resshā): A namesake-themed Ressha that is primarily used by ToQ 6gou and was originally the Drill Cryner (ドリルクライナー, Doriru Kurainā). Due to the latter trait, the Shadow Line's giant robots can also combine with the Drill Ressha.
- Diesel Ressha (ディーゼルレッシャー, Dīzeru Resshā): A diesel locomotive-themed Ressha and the oldest Ressha due to running on the imagination of internal combustion engines that is loaded with the Diesel Missiles (ディーゼルミサイル, Dīzeruō Misairu), and forms the head, torso, and arms of DieselOh.
- Hyper Ressha (ハイパーレッシャー, Haipā Resshā): A larger steam locomotive-themed Ressha that serves as the Rainbow Line President's headquarters and can transform into the Hyper Ressha Terminal (ハイパーレッシャターミナル, Haipā Ressha Tāminaru). It can also assume a humanoid form called Hyper Ressha TeiOh (ハイパーレッシャテイオー, Haipā Ressha Teiō) via Hyper Ressha Transformation (ハイパー列車変形, Haipā Ressha Henkei) where it is equipped with a pair of Hand Launchers (ハンドランチャー, Hando Ranchā). Its finisher is the Hyper Ressha TeiOh: Giant Flash (ハイパーレッシャテイオー・ジャイアントフラッシュ, Haipā Ressha Teiō Jaianto Furasshu). Though it usually answers to the President, this Ressha can be used by Hyper ToQ 1gou.
- Kyoryuger Ressha (キョウリュウジャー烈車, Kyōryūjā Ressha): A dinosaur-themed Ressha form that Kyoryu Red's partner, Zyudenryu Gabutyra, takes on during the events of the crossover film Heisei Rider vs. Shōwa Rider: Kamen Rider Taisen feat. Super Sentai.
- Safari Ressha (サファリレッシャー, Safari Resshā): A series of animal-themed Ressha that operate on the Galaxy Line, normally answer to Lady, though the ToQgers are able to pilot them as well, and appear exclusively in the film Ressha Sentai ToQger the Movie: Galaxy Line S.O.S.
  - Lion Ressha (ライオンレッシャー, Raion Resshā): A namesake/steam locomotive-themed Ressha piloted by ToQ 1gou that forms the head of head and torso of Safarai GaOh.
  - Eagle Ressha (イーグルレッシャー, Īguru Resshā): A namesake/Shinkansen-themed Ressha piloted by ToQ 2gou that forms the right leg of Safari GaOh.
  - Wildcat Ressha (ワイルドキャットレッシャー, Wairudokyatto Resshā): A namesake/commuter rail-themed Ressha piloted by ToQ 3gou that forms the left arm of Safari GaOh.
  - Alligator Ressha (アリゲーターレッシャー, Arigētā Resshā): A namesake/Shinkansen-themed Ressha piloted by ToQ 4gou that forms the left leg of Safari GaOh.
  - Panda Ressha (パンダレッシャー, Panda Resshā): A namesake/commuter rail-themed Ressha piloted by ToQ 5gou that forms the right arm of Safari GaOh.

==== Ressha Combinations ====
- ToQ-Oh (トッキュウオー, Tokkyūō): The ToQgers' first giant robot composed of the five main Ressha that wields the crossing gate-like Fumikiri Ken (フミキリケン), (Note: Fumikiri (踏切) is Japanese for "railroad crossing" while 剣 (Ken) is Japanese for "sword".) which has a Sword Mode for performing the Fumikiri Ken: Ressha Slash (フミキリケン・烈車スラッシュ, Fumikiri Ken Ressha Surasshu) finisher and a Gun Mode for performing the Fumikiri ToQ Shot (フミキリトッキュウショット, Fumikiri Tokkyū Shotto) finisher. In Bakuage Sentai Boonboomger, the Rainbow Line had modified the original five-seater cockpit to be a single-seater pilot room, which allows Bun Violet to pilot the giant robot after he further accommodates the system to fit with his Boonboom Controller.
  - ToQ-Oh Shield (トッキュウオーシールド, Tokkyūō Shīrudo): A combination of ToQ-Oh and the Shield Ressha that possesses increased defensive capabilities and can perform the Signal Shield Beam (シグナルシールドビーム, Shigunaru Shīrudo Bīmu) attack.
  - ToQ-Oh Car Carrier (トッキュウオーカーキャリア, Tokkyūō Kā Kyaria): A combination of ToQ-Oh and the Car Carrier Ressha. Its finisher is the Car Carrier Dash (カーキャリアダッシュ, Kā Kyaria Dasshu).
  - ToQ-Oh Tank (トッキュウオータンク, Tokkyūō Tanku): A combination of ToQ-Oh and the Tank Ressha that grants increased punching capabilities. Its finisher is the Tank Upper (タンクアッパー, Tanku Appā).
  - ToQ-Oh Car Carrier Tank (トッキュウオーカーキャリアタンク, Tokkyūō Kā Kyaria Tanku): A combination of ToQ-Oh and the Car Carrier and Tank Ressha. Its finisher is the Car Carrier Tank Shoot (カーキャリアータンクシュート, Kā Kyariā Tanku Shūto).
  - ToQ-Oh Police (トッキュウオーポリス, Tokkyūō Porisu): A combination of ToQ-Oh and the Police Ressha. Its finisher is the Police Smash (ポリススマッシュ, Porisu Sumasshu).
  - ToQ-Oh Drill (トッキュウオードリル, Tokkyūō Doriru): A combination of ToQ-Oh and the Drill Ressha. Its finisher is the Drill Tornado (ドリルトルネード, Doriru Torunēdo).
  - ToQ-Oh Build (トッキュウオービルド, Tokkyūō Birudo): A combination of ToQ-Oh and two of the Build Ressha's front cars. Its finisher is the ToQ-Oh: Bucket Break (トッキュウオー・バケットブレイク, Tokkyūō Baketto Bureiku).
  - ToQ-Oh Kyoryuzin feat. DenLiner (トッキュウオーキョウリュウジン feat.デンライナー, Tokkyūō Kyōryū Jin Fīcharingu Denrainā): A combination of ToQ-Oh, the Kyoryuger Ressha, and Kamen Rider Den-O's DenLiner that wields Kyoryuzin's Goren Zyudenken. Its finisher is the Fumikiri Ken: Brave Arrival Slash (フミキリケン・ブレイブ参上スラッシュ, Fumikiri Ken Bureibu Sanjō Surasshu). This combination appears exclusively in the crossover film Heisei Rider vs. Shōwa Rider: Kamen Rider Taisen feat. Super Sentai.
- DieselOh (ディーゼルオー, Dīzeruō): The ToQgers' second giant robot composed of the Diesel, Car Carrier, and Tank Ressha that possesses incredible strength and can perform the DieselOh Impact (ディーゼルオーインパクト, Dīzeruō Inpakuto) attack. Its finisher is the DieselOh: Spin Kick (ディーゼルオー・スピンキック, Dīzeruō Supin Kikku).
  - DieselOh Fire (ディーゼルオーファイヤー, Dīzeruō Faiyā): A combination of DieselOh and the Fire Ressha. Its finisher is the Fire Splash (ファイヤースプラッシュ, Faiyā Supurasshu).
  - DieselOh Police Fire (ディーゼルオーポリスファイヤー, Dīzeruō Porisu Faiyā): A combination of DieselOh and the Police and Fire Ressha that can produce Fire Defoamer (ファイヤー消泡剤, Faiyā Shōhōzai).
- Cho ToQ-Oh (超トッキュウオー, Chō Tokkyūō): The Super Ressha Combination (超烈車合体, Chō Ressha Gattai) of ToQ-Oh and DieselOh that is equipped with the forearm-mounted Cho ToQ Cannons (超トッキュウキャノン, Chō Tokkyū Kyanon). Its finisher is the Cho ToQ-Oh Full Burst Finish (超トッキュウオー・フルバーストフィニッシュ, Chō Tokkyūō Furu Bāsuto Finisshu).
  - Cho ToQ-Oh Fire (超トッキュウオーファイヤー, Chō Tokkyūō Faiyā): A combination of Cho ToQ-Oh and the Fire Ressha. Its finisher is the Super Boiling Water Splash (超熱湯スプラッシュ, Chō Nettō Supurasshu).
  - Cho ToQ-Oh Police (超トッキュウオーポリス, Chō Tokkyūō Porisu): A combination of Cho ToQ-Oh and the Police Ressha. Its finisher is the Cho ToQ-Oh: Police Cannon (超トッキュウオー・ポリスキャノン, Chō Tokkyūō Porisu Kyanon).
  - Cho ToQ-Oh Police Shield (超トッキュウオーポリスシールド, Chō Tokkyūō Porisu Shīrudo): A combination of Cho ToQ-Oh and the Police and Shield Ressha.
  - Cho ToQ-Oh Police Fire (超トッキュウオーポリスファイヤー, Chō Tokkyūō Porisu Faiyā): A combination of Cho ToQ-Oh and the Police and Fire Ressha. Its finisher is the Fire Smash (ファイヤースマッシュ, Faiyā Sumasshu).
- Build DaiOh (ビルドダイオー, Birudo Daiō): The Build Ressha's humanoid form and ToQ 6gou's personal giant robot that is equipped with a pair of Shoulder Beams (ショルダービーム, Shorudā Bīmu). Its finisher is the Build DaiOh: Bucket Break (ビルドダイオー・バケットブレイク, Birudo Daiō Baketto Bureiku).
  - Build DaiOh Drill (ビルドダイオードリル, Birudo Daiō Doriru): A combination of the Build and Drill Ressha. Its finisher is the Build DaiOh: Shovel Drill Double Crash (ビルドダイオー・ショベルドリルダブルクラッシュ, Birudo Daiō Shoberu Doriru Daburu Kurasshu).
  - Build DaiOh Tank (ビルドダイオータンク, Birudo Daiō Tanku): A combination of the Build and Tank Ressha.
- Cho Cho ToQ-DaiOh (超超トッキュウダイオー, Chō Chō Tokkyūdaiō): The Super Super Ressha Combination (超超烈車合体, Chō Chō Ressha Gattai) of ToQ-Oh, DieselOh, and the Build Ressha that wields the chest-mounted Cho Cho ToQ Super Cannon (超超トッキュウスーパーキャノン, Chō Chō Tokkyū Sūpā Kyanon) and the Shovel Crusher (ショベルクラッシャー, Shoberu Kurasshā) lance. Its finisher is the Cho Cho ToQ-DaiOh: Imagination Express (超超トッキュウダイオー・イマジネーションエクスプレス, Chō Chō Tokkyū Dai Ō Imajinēshon Ekusupuresu).
- ToQ Rainbow (トッキュウレインボー, Tokkyū Reinbō): The Hyper Ressha Combination (ハイパー列車合体, Haipā Ressha Gattai) of ToQ-Oh, DieselOh, and the Shield, Fire, Police, Build, Drill, and Hyper Ressha that is equipped with the twin forearm-mounted Rainbow Beam Cannons (レインボービームキャノン, Reinbō Bīmu Kyanon), which can become the Rainbow Blades (レインボーブレード, Reinbō Burēdo) that allow it to perform the Rainbow Slash (レインボースラッシュ, Reinbō Surasshu) attack. Its finisher is the ToQ Rainbow: Final Slash (トッキュウレインボー・ファイナルスラッシュ, Tokkyū Reinbō Fainaru Surasshu).
- Safari GaOh (サファリガオー, Safari Gaō): A combination of the Safari Ressha that can assume a lion mode. Its finisher is the ToQ Safari Double Kick (トッキュウサファリダブルキック, Tokkyū Safari Daburu Kikku), which is performed alongside ToQ-Oh. This combination appears exclusively in the film Ressha Sentai ToQger the Movie: Galaxy Line S.O.S.
- HaOh ToQ DaiOh (覇王トッキュウダイオー, Haō Tokkyū Daiō): The Ninnin ToQ Combination (ニンニントッキュウ合体, Ninnin Tokkyū Gattai) of ToQ-Oh, the Build Ressha, and Lion HaOjo that is controlled by the ToQgers and Ninningers. Its finisher is the Otomonin Connection Splendid Crash (オトモ忍レンケツアッパレクラッシュ, Otomonin Renketsu Appare Kurasshu). This combination appears exclusively in the crossover film Shuriken Sentai Ninninger vs. ToQger the Movie: Ninja in Wonderland.
- Byunbyum Mach Robo ToQ Custom (ビュンビュンマッハーロボ トッキュウカスタム, Byunbyun Mahhā Robo Tokkyū Kasutamu): A combination of Byunbyum Mach and the Blue, Yellow, Green, and Pink Ressha that wields the Fumikiri Ken. Its finisher is the Fumikiri Ken: Byunbyum Finish (フミキリケン・ビョンビョムフィニッシュ, Fumikiri Ken Byunbyun Finisshu). This combination appears exclusively in Bakuage Sentai Boonboomger.

== Recurring characters ==
=== Rainbow Line ===
Rainbow Line (レインボーライン, Reinbō Rain)

==== Conductor ====
The Conductor (車掌, Shashō) is an eccentric and enigmatic train conductor for the Rainbow Line who possesses knowledge of the ToQgers' past, which he withholds from the group. As of the V-Cinema They Went and Came Back Again Ressha Sentai ToQGer: Super ToQ 7gou of Dreams, he has been promoted to commander of the Rainbow Line's railroad police force, was renamed Former Conductor (元車掌, Moto Shashō) as such, and became the violet-colored ToQ 7gou (トッキュウ7号, Tokkyū Nanagō).

Similarly to Akira, the Conductor utilizes his own AppliChanger to transform into ToQ 7gou. While transformed, he carries a ToQ Blaster like the primary ToQgers.

The Conductor is portrayed by Tsutomu Sekine (関根 勤, Sekine Tsutomu).

==== Ticket ====
Ticket (チケット, Chiketto) is the Conductor's sharp-tongued and straightforward monkey-like hand puppet, though the former dislikes being called as such. During the events of Ressha Sentai ToQger DVD Special: Farewell, Ticket! The Wasteland Super ToQ Battle!!, it is revealed Ticket previously used the AppliChanger before it was given to Akira. Additionally, the former temporarily transfers himself to Akira's hand so he can use the AppliChanger to become Ticket 6gou (チケット6号, Chiketto Rokugō) and settle a rivalry with his nemesis, Kaniros, who killed Ticket's girlfriend Jennifer in the past. As of the V-Cinema They Went and Came Back Again Ressha Sentai ToQger: Super ToQ 7gou of Dreams, Ticket is now worn by Wagon.

Ticket is voiced by Kappei Yamaguchi (山口 勝平, Yamaguchi Kappei), who also voices the ToQgers' equipment and serves as the series' narrator.

==== Wagon ====
Wagon (ワゴン) is a robotic assistant who sells drinks and meals to the ToQgers and performs maintenance and chores on the Ressha. Though mysterious, she has a knack for putting a smile on everyone's faces despite her ditzy personality. As of the V-Cinema They Went and Came Back Again Ressha Sentai ToQger Returns: Super ToQ 7gou of Dreams, Wagon has taken over the Conductor's duties after he becomes ToQ 7gou.

Wagon is voiced by Yui Horie (堀江 由衣, Horie Yui).

==== President ====
The Rainbow Line President (レインボーライン総裁, Reinbō Rain Sōsai) is a man who appears to be wearing a rabbit-themed mascot head in the same vein that Ticket appears to be a monkey-themed puppet and directs all actions on the Rainbow Line, having used his powers to transform the ToQgers into adults in order to help them resist the power of darkness while retaining their imagination.

The President is voiced by Kōsuke Toriumi (鳥海 浩輔, Toriumi Kōsuke).

=== Shadow Line ===
The Shadow Line (シャドーライン, Shadō Rain) are steampunk-themed denizens of the dark who wish to consume the world in darkness and are based in the Castle Terminal (キャッスルターミナル, Kyassuru Tāminaru), the source of their railway. To achieve their goal, the group's acting leaders send Shadow Ressha called Cryners (クライナー, Kurainā) (Note: "Cryner" is a portmanteau of "cry", kurai (暗い, "dark, gloomy"), and "liner" (ライナー, rainā).) and/or Shadow Creeps to establish Dark Stations (闇駅, Yami Eki) to gradually convert the surrounding cities into Shadow Towns (シャドータウン, Shadō Taun) and absorb them into the Shadow Line's world, erasing all memory of the original town in the process. The acting leaders initially gather darkness to give their leader, Zet, entry into the world, before shifting their focus towards spreading darkness around the world to make it a utopia for them. They are also generally active during most of the year, but are forced to cease activities during the holiday season, which they refer to as the Darkness Decline (ヤミベリ, Yamiberi) as the amount of imagination across the world weakens them for the duration. During the Shadow Line's final battle with the ToQgers, Zet infuses his darkness into Castle Terminal to transform it into a giant robotic monster called the Dark Behemoth (闇の巨獣, Yami no Kyojū), which exists to spread its creator's vast darkness, but it is destroyed by all of the ToQgers' Ressha.

All Cryners are capable of changing into a humanoid Cryner Robo (クライナーロボ, Kurainā Robo) form, which is equipped with twin forearm-mounted cannons, with the Shadow Line's leaders each possessing a unique model. Additionally, three Cryner Robos are able to combine into a Cho-Cryner Robo (超クライナーロボ, Chō-Kurainā Robo), which is equipped with shoulder-mounted beam cannons, the Rail Gladius (レール系グラディウス, Rēru-kei Guradiusu), and the Rail Heater Shield (レール系ヒーターシールド, Rēru-kei Hītā Shīrudo).

==== Baron Nero ====
Baron Nero (ネロ男爵, Nero-danshaku) (Note: Baron Nero's name comes from the Italian word for the color black: nero.) is the acting leader of the Shadow Line in Zet's absence whose Shadow Creeps serve him by targeting multiple stations at once to gather enough darkness to bring Zet into the human world, with some directly participating in Nero's various schemes. Despite learning of Zet's obsession with light, Nero remains loyal to his leader, believing the obsession to be a phase before resolving to help him consume the world's light amidst verbal abuse from Marchioness Mork. During the Darkness Decline, Nero pilots a Cho-Cryner Robo to protect Castle Terminal from the ToQgers before his giant robot is destroyed by Build DaiOh. After being mortally wounded by ToQ 6gou in a duel, Nero sacrifices himself to heal Zet's injuries.

In battle, Nero is a skilled melee fighter who wields the Gun Stick (銃器系ステッキ, Jūki-kei Sutekki) cane gun and the Boomerang Top Hat (ブーメラン系トップハット, Būmeran-kei Toppu Hatto), which he can use like a chakram or to fire a dark energy beam.

Baron Nero is voiced by Jun Fukuyama (福山 潤, Fukuyama Jun).

==== Madame Noir ====
Madame Noir (ノア夫人, Noa-fujin) (Note: Madame Noir's name comes from the French word for the color black: noir.) is the secondary leader of the Shadow Line whose Shadow Creeps focus on gathering high-quality darkness to refine her daughter, Miss Glitta's, beauty and prepare her for her upcoming wedding to Zet to secretly gain the throne through her. After Zet absorbs Glitta and thwarts her attempt on his life however, Noir is forced to submit to him. When Marchioness Mork moves into Castle Terminal, Noir tries to prove herself by using her Control Black Feathers (操り系黒羽根, Ayatsuri-kei Kurobane) to turn citizens into berserkers. While the plan fails, she learns Glitta is still alive inside Zet and bides her time by using less capable Shadow Creeps to gather minimal amounts of darkness until she can free her. After freeing Boseki Shadow during the Darkness Decline, Noir is shocked to learn Glitta does not want to leave Zet, who blasts Noir out of Castle Terminal. Grievously injured, she joins forces with General Schwarz and ToQ 6gou to free Glitta before Noir is killed by Zet.

In battle, Noir wields the Gun Parasol (銃器系パラソル, Jūki-kei Parasoru), which functions as a beam/machine gun, saber, and shield.

Madame Noir is voiced by Aya Hisakawa (久川 綾, Hisakawa Aya).

==== General Schwarz ====
General Schwarz (シュバルツ将軍, Shubarutsu-shōgun) (Note: General Schwarz's name comes from the German word for the color black: schwarz.) is the Shadow Line's military leader who is obsessed with building the Shadow Ressha forces to deal with the ToQgers once he obtains enough intelligence on them and a former friend of Akira Nijino's. Additionally, Schwarz is aware of Miss Glitta's feelings for him, promising to tell her at a later time. Before he can do so, Zet absorbs her during their wedding and knocks Schwarz into a nearby river, where the latter is presumed dead and secretly vows revenge. In pursuit of his goal, Schwarz tricks the ToQgers into forming an alliance with him so he can steal the Drill Ressha, only to learn Glitta is still alive within Zet's body. After being confronted by Nijino, Schwarz agrees to return the Drill Ressha in exchange for the former's services during the Darkness Decline. Despite rescuing Glitta, Schwarz learns too late that he endangered her further and sends her away in his personal Cryner while he attempts to fight Zet-Shin, only to suffer fatal injuries. Before he dies, Schwarz taunts the emperor with the fact that the former had found his own light before he did.

In battle, Schwarz is a capable fighter who wields the General Black Iron Sword (将軍系黒鉄剣, Shōgun-kei Kuroganeken). Additionally, his personal Cryner Robo is equipped with twin forearm-mounted spikes and a sword.

General Schwarz is voiced by Haruhiko Jō (壤 晴彦, Jō Haruhiko).

==== Miss Glitta ====
Miss Glitta (グリッタ嬢, Guritta-jō) (Note: Miss Glitta's name comes from "glitter".) is Madame Noir's daughter who is being brought up to become a bride for Zet once he enters the world, though Glitta is secretly infatuated with General Schwarz after receiving a Rose Handkerchief (薔薇のハンカチ, Bara no Hankachi) that he dropped and said she could keep. Upon meeting Zet, she finds him frightening and forms a secret alliance with Schwarz in a failed attempt to evade the wedding. As the event gets underway, she absorbs him for his powers as part of her mother's scheme to take the throne from him and becomes the Empress of Darkness (闇の女帝, Yami no Jotei). Becoming more mature as a result of Zet influencing her actions, Glitta helps Schwarz attack the ToQgers, leading to her taking a fatal blow meant for him. As he attends to her well-being, she expresses her feelings for him, only to be absorbed from the inside by Zet for her inner light. Though presumed dead, Glitta is later revealed to still be alive, functioning as a hindrance to his full potential. Amidst the Darkness Decline, she gradually begins to take over his body before eventually being freed by Noir and Schwarz, only to watch them die in front of her after he sends her away in his personal Cryner for her own safety. Intent on saving Zet from himself and averting further deaths, she seeks out the ToQgers' help in covering her while she takes over Castle Terminal's controls and move it towards the dark depths. She later takes the incorporeal Zet back to the Shadow Line.

During the events of the V-Cinema They Went and Came Back Again Ressha Sentai ToQger: Super ToQ 7gou of Dreams, Glitta unknowingly creates a time paradox that allows the ToQgers to defeat Archduke Hei.

Miss Glitta is voiced by Noriko Hidaka (日高 のり子, Hidaka Noriko).

==== Dark Emperor Zet ====
Dark Emperor Zet (闇の皇帝ゼット, Yami no Kōtei Zetto) (Note: Also spelt as "Z".) is the human-like ruler of the Shadow Line who embodies the purest form of darkness and was responsible for dragging Subarugahama into the developing Shadow Line. Ironically, he develops an unhealthy obsession with light due to coming into contact with Right after being attracted to Subarugahama's festival lights, which reflects in his Shadow Creeps' unique ability to produce light or possession of a glittering quality. Due to initially lacking a full physical presence in the human world, he tasks his followers with gathering darkness from human hearts to expand the Shadow Line under the belief that those he deems loyal and valuable will be spared. Upon his arrival from the World of Darkness, he recognizes the ToQgers as the children who escaped Subarugahama, develops an interest in Right, and reveals himself to him, though Zet is unable to remain in the light for extended periods of time.

After allowing Miss Glitta to absorb him before eventually absorbing her in turn to obtain her "light" and remove his weakness, he intends to take the ToQgers' light next. However, he discovers that he could not fully absorb Glitta due to her keeping his full power in check, resulting in him assuming a flawed version of his monstrous true form and becoming a moody loose cannon. Amidst the Darkness Decline and while fighting General Schwarz and ToQ 6gou, Zet briefly loses control over Glitta, who tries to warn the ToQgers not to free her. However, Schwarz and Noir do so, unknowingly allowing Zet to achieve his full potential and his true form, Zet-Shin (ゼット・真, Zetto Shin) before killing Noir and Schwarz. Accepting he can never have the light as his own, Zet learns part of his being entered Right's body. This combined with learning Glitta was taking pity on him convinces Zet to mount an assault on the world and drown it in darkness, destroying any remaining light, while sparing Right long enough to see the Dark Behemoth consume everything in its path. After the Dark Behemoth is destroyed and he is mortally wounded by the ToQgers, Zet absorbs his remaining followers to heal his injures and increase his power before he is defeated by Right as Rainbow ToQ 1gou. Seeing a rainbow before he explodes in a storm of darkness, Glitta retrieves Zet's essence and takes him back to the Shadow Line to re-constitute himself in peace.

In battle, Zet wields the Imperial Killer Sword (皇帝系キラーソード, Kōtei-kei Kirā Sōdo) in his flawed and true monstrous forms. While fighting Schwarz and ToQ 6gou, Zet steals the latter's transformation equipment and briefly becomes Zet 6gou (ゼット6号, Zetto Rokugō). Additionally, Zet possesses a white Imperial Cryner (皇帝専用クライナー, Kōtei Senyō-kei Kurainā), whose Cryner Robo mode wields the Imperial Long Sword (皇帝専用系ロングソード, Kōtei Senyō-kei Rongu Sōdo) and the Darkness Wave Twin Super Ressha Cannons (闇波動2連系超烈車砲, Yami Hadō Niren-kei Chō Ressha Hō), which can be used to perform the Darkness Fall (ダークネスフォール, Dākunesu Fōru) attack.

Dark Emperor Zet is portrayed by Kengo Ohkuchi (大口 兼悟, Ōkuchi Kengo).

==== Marchioness Mork ====
Marchioness Mork (モルク侯爵, Moruku-kōshaku) (Note: Marchioness Mork's name comes from the Danish and Norwegian words for dark: mørk.) is the oldest member of the Shadow Line who personally raised Zet, resulting in her behaving informally around him despite their status, and was originally in charge of overseeing Shadow Towns via her Keepers before moving into Castle Terminal due to Zet's obsession with light and to quell sedition among their ranks. Mork continues to loyally serve Zet before eventually allowing him to absorb her to heal his injuries.

In battle, Mork is a formidable combatant despite her age and wields the Marchioness Mic Rod (侯爵系マイクロッド, Kōshaku-kei Maiku Roddo), which can fire green energy. Additionally, her personal Cryner Robo wields a larger version of her Marchioness Mic Rod and train horns on its shoulders capable of firing supersonic beams.

Marchioness Mork is voiced by Reiko Suzuki (鈴木 れい子, Suzuki Reiko).

==== Clothes ====
The Clothes (クローズ, Kurōzu) (Note: The Clothes's name comes from the Japanese word for the color black: kuro (黒).) are train robber-themed foot soldiers who support the Shadow Creeps, wield Tommy guns that can transform into hatchet-like weapons, and pilot Cryners.

==== Shadow Creeps ====
The Shadow Creeps (シャドー怪人, Shadō Kaijin) are the Shadow Line's monstrous front line warriors whose primary purpose is to establish Dark Stations in a city to propagate the darkness within its citizens' hearts and extend the Shadow Line's railway. If they are defeated in their human size, they can use the darkness that they have gathered to enlarge themselves to giant size. If they are killed regardless of what size they are, their Dark Station and its connected city are restored to their original states.

- Bag Shadow (バッグシャドー, Baggu Shadō): A namesake-themed Shadow Creep and servant of Madame Noir's who possesses the ability to hold things within his body and wields the Clutchpurse Rod (ガマグチ系ロッド, Gamaguchi-kei Roddo), which can launch fireballs. At the Gakisuteyama (餓鬼捨て山; Abandoned Brat Mountain) Dark Station, he kidnaps children with high imagination to make them cry and increase the length of his Cryner's railway. However, he inadvertently kidnaps ToQ 1gou, which alerts the other ToQgers to the Shadow Creep's position. After being defeated by ToQ 1gou and enlarging himself, Bag Shadow is killed by ToQ-Oh. Bag Shadow is voiced by Hisao Egawa (江川 央生, Egawa Hisao).
- Sabre Shadow (サーベルシャドー, Sāberu Shadō): A namesake-themed Shadow Creep and servant of Baron Nero's who wields the Hand Guard Sabre (護拳系サーベル, Goken-kei Sāberu) and the Four-Barreled Magnum (4連系マグナム, Yonren-kei Magunamu) handgun. Displaying an obsession with dueling and zero tolerance for cowards, Sabre Shadow converted the Nozomigahara (希ヶ原; Wish Fields) Station into the Kettougahara (決闘ヶ原, Kettōgahara; Dueling Fields) Dark Station and forces its citizens to duel during a particular time of the day. After losing to ToQ 1gou in a duel, Sabre Shadow enlarges himself, but is killed by ToQ-Oh in another duel. Sabre Shadow is voiced by Tomoyuki Shimura (志村 知幸, Shimura Tomoyuki).
- Chain Shadow (チェーンシャドー, Chēn Shadō): A namesake-themed Shadow Creep and servant of Madame Noir's who carries the Cross Coffin (クロス系棺桶, Kurosu-kei Kan'oke) with him to kidnap people and drain their imagination via fear of death. After Noir sends him to convert the Heiwadani (平和谷; Peace Valley) Station into the Shinotani (死の谷; Death Valley) Dark Station, he captures Kagura after she is accidentally abandoned by her teammates, but her indomitable spirit keeps her from giving up and helps her destroy the coffin. After being defeated by the ToQgers and enlarging himself, Chain Shadow is killed by ToQ-Oh. Chain Shadow is voiced by Junpei Morita (森田 順平, Morita Junpei).
- Stove Shadow (ストーブシャドー, Sutōbu Shadō): A childish namesake-themed Shadow Creep and servant of Miss Glitta's who is equipped with a stomach furnace capable of firing Coal Gravel (石炭系ツブテ, Sekitan-kei Tsubute). She sends him to secretly help General Schwarz and use the Itaigawa (痛い川; It Hurts River) Dark Station to inflict pain and steal imagination. After being defeated by the ToQgers and enlarging himself, Stove Shadow is killed by ToQ-Oh Shield. Stove Shadow voiced by Kōichi Sakaguchi (坂口 候一, Sakaguchi Kōichi).
- Baketsu Shadow (バケツシャドー, Baketsu Shadō): A gluttonous bucket-themed Shadow Creep and servant of Baron Nero's who wields the Top Lid Big Mouth (上ぶた系ビッグマウス, Uebuta-kei Biggu Mausu), which allows him to consume all food items in his vicinity and is tasked with starving the Harapeko (腹ペコ; "Hungry") Dark Station's inhabitants so he can consume their sadness and power his Cryner. After being defeated by the ToQgers and enlarging himself, Baketsu Shadow is killed by ToQ-Oh Car Carrier, which reverts the Dark Station to the Ōmori (大盛; Big Size) Station. Baketsu Shadow is voiced by Daiki Nakamura (中村 大樹, Nakamura Daiki).
- Hanko Shadow (ハンコシャドー, Hanko Shadō): A namesake-themed Shadow Creep and servant of Madame Noir's who wields the Stamp Gloves (ハンコ系グローブ, Hanko-kei Gurūbu) and the Branding Iron Rod (焼きゴテ系ロッド, Yakigote-kei Roddo). From his base at the Mukiryokuzaka (無気力坂; Unmotivated Slope) Dark Station, he makes everyone lose their motivation and hinders the ToQgers' attempts to stop him until ToQ 4gou and 5gou find a way to destroy Hanko Shadow's Stamp Gloves from a distance and restore his victims. Hanko Shadow enlarges himself, but is killed by ToQ-Oh Car Carrier. Hanko Shadow is voiced by Kenji Hamada (浜田 賢二, Hamada Kenji).
- Bakudan Shadow (バクダンシャドー, Bakudan Shadō): A bomb-themed Shadow Creep and servant of Baron Nero's who possesses destructive capabilities and can manifest a Clone Mini Bomb (分身系ミニ爆弾, Bunshin-kei Mini Bakudan). Nero sends him to distract the ToQgers from interfering in another of the latter's underlings' schemes. In pursuit of this, Bakudan Shadow attempts to send the ToQgers' Ressha careening into an oil refinery and places a bomb on Tokatti. However, Hikari borrows his friend's ToQ Ressha to trick the Shadow Creep into believing Tokatti freed himself. After being thrown out of the Ressha, Bakudan Shadow enlarges himself before he is killed by the primary Ressha and Diesel Ressha. Bakudan Shadow is voiced by Atsushi Imaruoka (伊丸岡 篤, Imaruoka Atsushi).
- Marionette Shadow (マリオネットシャドー, Marionetto Shadō): A namesake-themed Shadow Creep and servant of Baron Nero's who wields the Puppetry Cutters (操り系カッター, Ayatsuri-kei Kattā), which can produce strings to control people, and the leg-mounted Doll Marionettes (ドール系マリオネット, Dōru-kei Marionetto), which he can bring to life to attack his opponents. Nero sends him to convert the Kitagojo (北伍城, Kitagojō) Station into the Daisitsuren (大失恋, Daishitsuren; Big Broken Heart) Dark Station by turning men into his puppets and have women fall in love with them before immediately breaking their hearts so he can absorb the women's darkness. After being defeated by the ToQgers and enlarging himself, Marionette Shadow is killed by DieselOh. Marionette Shadow is voiced by Kōki Uchiyama (内山 昂輝, Uchiyama Kōki).
- Type Shadow (タイプシャドー, Taipu Shadō): A typewriter-themed Shadow Creep and servant of Madame Noir's who can use the Typewriter Keys (タイプライター系キー, Taipuraitā-kei Kī) on his body to type out titles onto people or objects and force them to live it out. She sends him to collect darkness in preparation for Zet's eventual arrival. Despite sending the ToQgers' Ressha into orbit and writing a title stating Tokatti will die at sunset, the ToQger uses his photographic memory to sharpen his accuracy and hit the appropriate keys necessary to alter the title and save himself and the Ressha. Type Shadow enlarges himself, but is killed by ToQ-Oh and DieselOh. Type Shadow is voiced by Yasunori Matsumoto (松本 保典, Matsumoto Yasunori).
- Lamp Shadow (ランプシャドー, Ranpu Shadō): A namesake-themed Shadow Creep and Zet's personal bodyguard who wields the Arm Lamp Scythe (アームランプ系サイズ, Āmu Ranpu-kei Saizu), which allows him to produce hypnotizing light and purge targets of their imagination. Zet sends him to test the ToQgers' light and convert the Yumenohoshi-yūenchimae (夢の星遊園地前; Dreamy Star Amusement Park) Station into the Yaminokage (闇の影; Dark Shadow) Dark Station, giving most of the ToQgers' amnesia in the process. After ToQ 1gou eventually restores his friends' memories, the ToQgers form Cho ToQ-Oh to kill an enlarged Lamp Shadow. Lamp Shadow is voiced by Junichi Suwabe (諏訪部 順一, Suwabe Jun'ichi).
- Loupe Shadow (ルーペシャドー, Rūpe Shadō): A magnifying glass-themed Shadow Creep and servant of Baron Nero's who wields the Magnifying Glass Lens (ルーペ系レンズ, Rūpe-kei Renzu), which allows him to fire energy beams and enlarge objects. Loupe Shadow intends to set a city on fire once it is painted black to maximize the damage. However, ToQ 1gou uses the Fire Ressha to save the city while ToQ 2gou, 3gou, and 4gou defeat Loupe Shadow. The Shadow Creep enlarges himself, but is killed by DieselOh Fire. Loupe Shadow is voiced by Kōji Tobe (戸部 公爾, Tobe Kōji).
- Sōjiki Shadow (ソウジキシャドー, Sōjiki Shadō): A vacuum cleaner-themed Shadow Creep and servant of Madame Noir's who wields the Vacuum Cleaner Arm (ソウジキ系アーム, Sōjiki-kei Āmu) and the Dust Pack (ダスト系パック, Dasuto-kei Pakku). She sends him to the city of Kiraridai to steal jewels for Miss Glitta's upcoming wedding, during which he unknowingly frames the ToQgers for his thefts. After ToQ 4gou clears his friends' names, the ToQgers defeat Sōjiki Shadow and reclaim the Police Ressha that was in his possession. The Shadow Creep enlarges himself, but is killed by ToQ-Oh Police. Sōjiki Shadow is voiced by Wataru Takagi (高木 渉, Takagi Wataru).
- Hammer Shadow (ハンマーシャドー, Hanmā Shadō): A namesake-themed Shadow Creep and servant of Miss Glitta's who wields the Pulverizing Big Hammer (粉砕系ビッグハンマー, Funsai-kei Biggu Hanmā) and the Fantasy Mini Hammer (夢幻系ミニハンマー, Mugen-kei Mini Hanmā), the latter of which he can use to materialize a target's deepest desire so he can destroy it along with his victims' happiness. Under Zet's instruction, she sends Hammer Shadow to the Akumugaoka (悪夢ヶ丘; "Nightmare Hill") Dark Station to destroy the residents' happiness. However, the Shadow Creep's powers fail to work on ToQ 3gou, which strengthens her imagination and allows her to overpower Hammer Shadow until he is rescued by General Schwarz, who intends to use his abilities in a bid to amass darkness by turning his Cryner into an illusionary dream world to lure in children and have them live out their dreams before escorting them to Hammer Shadow to harvest the resulting darkness. Nonetheless, the ToQgers free the children. Hammer Shadow enlarges himself, but is killed by Cho ToQ-Oh. Hammer Shadow is voiced by Chō (チョー).
- Ring Shadow (リングシャドー, Ringu Shadō): A possessive and effeminate namesake-themed Shadow Creep and servant of Zet's who is equipped with a pair of Jewel Gauntlets (宝石系ガントレット, Hōseki-kei Gantoretto) and the Headache Ring (頭痛系リング, Zutsū-kei Ringu) headbands. Ring Shadow terrorizes the inhabitants of the Henzutsū (変頭痛; Strange Headache) Dark Station until the ToQgers, joined by ToQ 6gou, defeat him. Ring Shadow enlarges himself, but is killed by ToQ-Oh Drill. Ring Shadow is voiced by Kenta Miyake (三宅 健太, Miyake Kenta).
- Fence Shadow (フェンスシャドー, Fensu Shadō): A namesake-themed Shadow Creep and servant of Miss Glitta's who wields the Iron Fence Lance (鉄柵系ランス, Tessaku-kei Ransu), which can fire spears, and the Barbed Wire Fence (鉄条網系フェンス, Tetsujōmō-kei Fensu), which can ensnare and electrocute targets. At General Schwarz's suggestion, she sends Fence Shadow to trap the ToQgers' Ressha with a Cryner Robo to put its occupants out of commission. As they were away at the time, ToQ 4gou and 6gou use the newly developed Build Ressha to free their friends before killing the enlarged Fence Shadow with Build DaiOh Drill. Fence Shadow is voiced by Katsuya Shiga (志賀 克也, Shiga Katsuya).
- Jack-in-the-Box Shadow (ジャックインザボックスシャドー, Jakkuinzabokkusu Shadō): A namesake-themed Shadow Creep and servant of Miss Glitta's who wields the Cuckoo Clock Door (鳩時計系ドア, Hatodokei-kei Doa), from which he can fire an energy beam, the Juggling Clubs (ジャグリング系棍棒, Jaguringu-kei Konbō), and the ability to launch anyone who laughs at his jokes and illusions into the air and generate darkness as they fall, especially within range of his Ōwarai (大笑井; "Big Laugh") Dark Station. Lacking a sense of humor, the immune ToQ 6gou defeats Jack-in-the-Box Shadow, who enlarges himself before he is killed by ToQ-Oh, DieselOh, and Build DaiOh. Jack-in-the-Box Shadow is voiced by Takahiro Mizushima (水島 大宙, Mizushima Takahiro).
- Sabão Shadow (シャボンシャドー, Shabon Shadō): A soap-themed Shadow Creep and servant of Miss Glitta's who can produce Bubble Bombs (泡系爆弾, Awa-kei Bakudan) and Change Soap (チェンジ系シャボン, Chenji-kei Shabon) bubbles, the latter of which is capable of switching targets' minds and bodies before eventually killing them. She asks him to use his powers on her and ToQ 3gou so Glitta can avoid her upcoming wedding to Zet, though Sabão Shadow also uses his powers on ToQ 1gou, 2gou, and 4gou, who receive help from ToQ 6ou to defeat the Shadow Creep and undo the switches. Sabão Shadow enlarges himself, but is killed by DieselOh Police Fire and Build DaiOh. Sabão Shadow is voiced by Kazuya Ichijō (一条 和矢, Ichijō Kazuya).
- Pinspo Shadow (ピンスポシャドー, Pinsupo Shadō): A spotlight-themed Shadow Creep and servant of Zet's who can use his Pinspot Flash (ピンスポット系フラッシュ, Pinsupotto-kei Furasshu) to bring fictional characters to life and the Six-part Flash (6連系フラッシュ, Rokuren-kei Furasshu) to produce a heat beam. Zet tasks him with obtaining light from fairy tale characters at the Otogi (おとぎ; "fairy tale") Dark Station. After Pinspo Shadow's darkness gets mixed in with the light however, Zet loses interest, leading to Baron Nero tasking the Shadow Creep with destroying fairy tale characters in the hopes of producing darkness. After being defeated by ToQ 2gou and Ryo Knight, Pinspo Shadow enlarges himself, but is killed by Build DaiOh Tank and ToQ-Oh Build. Pinspo Shadow is voiced by Issei Futamata (二又 一成, Futamata Issei).
- Coin Shadow (コインシャドー, Koin Shadō): A namesake-themed Shadow Creep and servant of Baron Nero's who possesses Shadow Line Coins (シャドーライン系コイン, Shadō Rain-kei Koin) and believes fighting is outdated. Coin Shadow assumes the guise of a human named Teruo Inzai (印西 輝男, Inzai Teruo) to drive a sentō into bankruptcy and claim the land it is on so he can build a new Shadow Line terminal over a Shadow Pool underneath the bathhouse's foundation. However, ToQ 5gou and 6gou expose and thwart him. Coin Shadow enlarges, but is killed by Cho ToQ-Oh Fire. Coin Shadow is voiced by Masahiro Kuranuki (倉貫 匡弘, Kuranuki Masahiro), who also portrays Teruo Inzai.
- Bottle Shadow (ボトルシャドー, Botoru Shadō): A wine bottle-themed Shadow Creep, one of Baron Nero's closest confidantes, and hunter of Shadow Line traitors who wields the Corkscrew Opener (コルクスクリュー系オープナー, Korukusukuryū-kei Ōpunā) and possesses the ability to ferment darkness within himself so he can fire a massive Red Beam, a sharp White Beam, or a mixed and refreshing Rosé Beam (ロゼビーム, Roze Bīmu). After being defeated by Hyper ToQ 4gou and enlarging himself, Bottle Shadow is killed by ToQ-Oh. Bottle Shadow is voiced by Shigeru Nakahara (中原 茂, Nakahara Shigeru).
- Wig Shadow (ウィッグシャドー, Wiggu Shadō): A namesake-themed Shadow Creep and servant of Madame Noir's who possesses a series of Bird Nest Wigs (鳥の巣系ウィッグ, Tori no Su-kei Wiggu), which force victims to raise a baby chick or die with it. She sends him to attack the ToQgers, though he fails to get ToQ 5gou, who was busy baking a birthday cake for ToQ 3gou at the time, while the ToQgers' wigs give birth to chickens that attack Wig Shadow. Taking advantage, the attached Hyper ToQ 3gou and 5gou defeat the Shadow Creep, who enlarges himself before he is killed by Cho Cho ToQ-DaiOh. Wig Shadow is voiced by Masahito Yabe (矢部 雅史, Yabe Masahito).
- Dining Set Brothers (ダイニングセットブラザーズ, Dainingu Setto Burazāzu): A group of namesake-themed Shadow Creep brothers and servants of Baron Nero's whose powers work best in conjunction with each other. Nero sends them to distract the ToQgers from the Hyper Ressha Terminal, but the brothers are all killed by them.
  - Table Shadow (テーブルシャドー, Teburu Shadō): A namesake-themed Shadow Creep and the oldest member of the Dining Set Brothers who wields the Four-Pillar War Fork (四脚系サスマタ, Shikyaku-kei Sasumata) and possesses the ability to flip objects as large as a bus over his head. While enacting Nero's mission, Table Shadow is forced to sacrifice one of his brothers to cover his escape before resuming his attack with his remaining brothers. After being defeated by the ToQgers and enlarging himself, Table Shadow is killed by Hyper Ressha TeiOh alongside his brothers. Table Shadow is voiced by Unshō Ishizuka (石塚 運昇, Ishizuka Unshō).
  - Chair Shadows (チェアシャドー, Chea Shadō): A trio of namesake-themed Shadow Creeps and Table Shadow's younger brothers who all wield a Single-Edged Fire Hook (片刃系トビグチ, Kataba-kei Tobiguchi) blade, possess the ability to summon more of their namesakes, and force people to sit down so they can shock them. The first Chair Shadow accompanies Table Shadow on his own, but is betrayed and sacrificed by him. After enlarging, Chair Shadow is killed by Cho ToQ-Oh, which reverts the Uragaeshi (裏返市; Reverse) Dark Station to the Uragoeshi (浦越市) Station. Following this, the remaining two Chair Shadows join Table Shadow in seeking revenge, only to be defeated by the ToQgers, The Chair Shadows enlarge themselves, but are killed by Hyper Ressha TeiOh alongside Table Shadow. The Chair Shadows are all voiced by Taiki Matsuno (松野 太紀, Matsuno Taiki).
- Chūshaki Shadow (チュウシャキシャドー, Chūshaki Shadō): A syringe-themed Shadow Creep and servant of Madame Noir's who wields the Bracelet Syringe (ブレスレット系注射器, Buresuretto-kei Chūshaki), which he uses on the martial arts community of his Chūdoku (注毒; "Inject Poison") Dark Station with the threat that he will kill them all at sunset unless they survive his challenges and break his arm-mounted syringe. Despite assuming the guise of a dojo master and leaving behind a decoy of himself, ToQ 1gou and 4gou thwart his scheme. After being defeated by Hyper ToQ 1gou and enlarging himself, Chūshaki Shadow is killed by Hyper Ressha TeiOh. Chūshaki Shadow is voiced by Mitsuaki Madono (真殿 光昭, Madono Mitsuaki).
- Billiard Shadow (ビリヤードシャドー, Biriyādo Shadō): A billiards-themed Shadow Creep and servant of Madame Noir's who wields the Woodpecker Cue (キツツキ系キュー, Kitsutsuki-kei Kyū), which can move humans like billiard balls, and the Shadow Cueball (シャドー系キューボール, Shadō-kei Kyūbōru) and Billiard Table (ビリヤード系テーブル, Biriyādo-kei Tēburu), both of which he can use in his Break Shot attack. While converting the Tsukiai (月愛; Moon Love) Station into the Tsukiai (突き合い; Poking Each Other) Dark Station, Billiard Shadow's actions inadvertently cause a man to fall in love with ToQ 3gou, resulting in a series of events that leads to a frustrated Hyper ToQ 2gou killing the Shadow Creep while taking his aggression out on him. Billiard Shadow is voiced by Takahiro Fujimoto (藤本 たかひろ, Fujimoto Takahiro).
- Mannenhitsu Shadow (マンネンヒツシャドー, Mannenhitsu Shadō): A fountain pen-themed Shadow Creep and servant of Madame Noir's who wields the Nib Axe (ニブ系アックス, Nibu-kei Akkusu) and a shoulder-mounted pen that uses Clothes-based ink to give targets' failing grades. He is sent to convert the Hakutendaigakumae (珀天大学前; Hakuten University) Station into the Rakudaigakumae (落第学前; Failure University) Dark Station and "flunk" the ToQgers when they interfere. After being defeated by Hyper ToQ 4gou and enlarging himself, Mannenhitsu Shadow is killed by ToQ Rainbow. Mannenhitsu Shadow is voiced by Nobuo Tobita (飛田 展男, Tobita Nobuo).
- Film Shadow (フィルムシャドー, Firumu Shadō): A film reel-themed Shadow Creep and servant of Madame Noir's who wields the Hit Film (ヒット系フィルム, Hitto-kei Firumu) and the Cut Sword (カット系ソード, Katto-kei Sōdo) along with the power to use his cinema knowledge to convert people's nightmares into films. He is sent to the Touto Film Studio to abduct the cast and crew of the upcoming Police Reporter Pestacore film to produce his masterpiece Yamitto Monster Z and gather as much darkness as possible from its national and overseas releases. After being defeated by the ToQgers and enlarging himself, Film Shadow is killed by ToQ Rainbow. Film Shadow is voiced by Hideo Ishikawa (石川 英郎, Ishikawa Hideo).
- Boseki Shadow (ボセキシャドー, Boseki Shadō): A headstone-themed Shadow Creep and servant of Madame Noir's who wields the Headstone Door (墓石系ドア, Boseki-kei Doa), from which he can absorb darkness from his shoulders and create replicas of previous Shadow Creeps. Due to recklessly overusing his powers, he was deemed a threat to the Shadow Line and imprisoned beneath Castle Terminal. In the present and amidst the Darkness Decline however, Noir releases Boseki Shadow and tasks him with siphoning Castle Terminal's darkness as part of her plan to overthrow Zet. After being defeated by the primary ToQgers and enlarging himself, he is killed by Cho ToQ-Oh Police. Boseki Shadow is voiced by Naoki Tatsuta (龍田 直樹, Tatsuta Naoki).
- Dollhouse Shadow (ドールハウスシャドー, Dōruhausu Shadō): A namesake-themed Shadow Creep and servant of Marchioness Mork's who wields the Embroidery Needle Rapier (刺繍針系レイピア, Shishūhari-kei Reipia) and the ability to trap people inside his namesakes. She sends him to confirm ToQ 1gou is causing Zet's light obsession. However, the Shadow Creep is defeated by Hyper ToQ 1gou, trapped in one of his own dollhouses, and killed by Cho Cho ToQ-DaiOh. Dollhouse Shadow is voiced by Kunihiro Kawamoto (河本 邦弘, Kawamoto Kunihiro).

===== Keepers =====
The Keepers (管理人, Kanrinin) are elite chess-themed Shadow Creeps and servants of Marchioness Mork's who control the Shadow Towns, towns that the Shadow Line has completely taken over and limit the ToQgers' transformation capabilities. Upon their defeat, a Keeper is forced to absorb a Shadow Town's darkness to enlarge themselves, with the town being completely restored following the Keeper's death.

- Keeper Rook (管理人ルーク, Kanrinin Rūku): The Keeper of the Ugokenai (動ヶ無イ; Cannot Move) Shadow Town who wields the Rook Chariot (ルーク系チャリオット, Rūku-kei Chariotto), which he can use to fire energy blasts. After being defeated by the ToQgers, he absorbs Ugokenai's darkness and his detachment of Clothes to make himself larger than previous Shadow Creeps until the ToQgers use Cho Cho ToQ-DaiOh to reduce him to the regular giant height before killing him. Keeper Rook is voiced by Nobutoshi Canna (神奈 延年, Kanna Nobutoshi).
- Keeper Bishop (管理人ビショップ, Kanrinin Bishoppu): The Keeper of the Samayoi (差迷井; Wander) Shadow Town, which distorts people's sense of direction to render them permanently lost, who wields the Bishop Elephant (ビショップ系エレファント, Bishoppu-kei Erefanto) staff, which can fire buzzsaws and fire beams. After being defeated by Hyper ToQ 1gou and enlarging himself, Keeper Bishop is killed by Cho Cho ToQ-DaiOh. Keeper Bishop is voiced by Takuya Kirimoto (桐本 琢也, Kirimoto Takuya).
- Keeper Knight (管理人ナイト, Kanrinin Naito): The Keeper of the Achikochi-machi (あちこち町; Here and There Town) Shadow Town, which he keeps in check by forcing its inhabitants to make impossible choices, who wields the spear-like Knight Just A Way (ナイト系ジャスタウェイ, Naito-kei Jasutawei) hobby horse, which he refers to as his "steed" since it enables him to move at superhuman speed. After ToQ 6gou throws Knight Just A Way into orbit, Hyper ToQ 2gou is able to defeat Keeper Knight. The Keeper enlarges himself, but is killed by Hyper Ressha TeiOh and Cho Cho ToQ-DaiOh. Keeper Knight is voiced by Daisuke Sakaguchi (阪口 大助, Sakaguchi Daisuke).
- Castle Keeper Pawn (城の番人ポーン, Shiro no Bannin Pōn): The gigantic Keeper of Castle Terminal who wields the Pawn Flail (ポーン系フレイル, Pōn-kei Fureiru). Mork summons him to battle the ToQgers, though Build DaiOh eventually kills him.

===== Other Shadow Creeps =====
- Enogu Shadow (エノグシャドー, Enogu Shadō): A paint-themed Shadow Creep who is capable of firing a beam that removes a target's colors and appears exclusively in the special drama sessions of the series' first original soundtrack. After he converts an unnamed station into the Donyori-Yokochō (どんより横丁; Gray Alley) Dark Station, the ToQgers defeat Enogu Shadow before killing the enlarged Shadow Creep with ToQ-Oh. Enogu Shadow is voiced by Yūji Mitsuya (三ツ矢 雄二, Mitsuya Yūji).
- Hound Shadow (ハウンドシャドー, Haundo Shadō): A namesake-themed Shadow Creep and servant of Count Nair's who is adorned with the Bear Trap Armor (トラバサミ系アーマー, Torabasami-kei Āmā) and appears exclusively in the film Ressha Sentai ToQger the Movie: Galaxy Line S.O.S. After being defeated by the ToQgers via the Safari Ressha, Hound Shadow fuses with Nair to become Giant Nair Hounder before they are killed by ToQ-Oh and SafariGaOh. Hound Shadow is voiced by KENN.
- Clock Shadow (クロックシャドー, Kurokku Shadō): A namesake-themed Shadow Creep and servant of Zet's who wields the Long Hand Sword (長針系ソード, Chōshin-kei Sōdo) and the Short Hand Sword (短針系ソード, Tanshin-kei Sōdo), and appears exclusively in the crossover film Ressha Sentai ToQger vs. Kyoryuger: The Movie. After being defeated by the ToQgers via the Renketsu Bazooka powered by the Victory Zyudenchi, Clock Shadow is absorbed by Salamazu. Clock Shadow is voiced by Masaya Onosaka (小野坂 昌也, Onosaka Masaya).
- Tank Top Shadow (タンクトップシャドー, Tanku Toppu Shadō): A namesake-themed Shadow Creep who dual wields the twin Nunchaku Hangers (ヌンチャク系ハンガー, Nunchaku-kei Hangā) and the ability to turn into his namesake and appears exclusively in the V-Cinema They Went and Came Back Again Ressha Sentai ToQger: Super ToQ 7gou of Dreams. After following Akira when he defected to the Rainbow Line, Tanktop Shadow remained loyal to him until he learned Akira's humanity was slowly killing him. In the hopes of restoring his friend's immortality, Tanktop Shadow helps Archduke Hei turn Akira back into Zaram. Upon realizing the error of his ways, Tanktop Shadow sacrifices himself to save Akira from Hei, but Akira revives him. Tanktop Shadow is voiced by Daisuke Namikawa (浪川 大輔, Namikawa Daisuke).

== Guest characters ==
- Moguraroid (モグラロイド, Moguraroido): A mole-themed cyborg and member of the Badan Empire. While attempting to bring his compatriots to the surface, he runs afoul of Kamen Rider Gaim and the ToQgers, with the latter destroying him. Moguraroid is voiced by Kyousei Tsukui (津久井 教生, Tsukui Kyōsei).
- Kota Kazuraba (葛葉 紘汰, Kazuraba Kōta): A young adult and member of the dance team, Team Gaim, from Zawame City who is able to become Kamen Rider Gaim (仮面ライダー鎧武（ガイム）, Kamen Raidā Gaimu). He and his friends encounter the ToQgers after they make a stop in Zawame City and joins forces with them to stop the Badan Empire. Additionally, he possesses enough imagination to see the Rainbow Line, but not enough to board until Narutaki gives him a Rainbow Pass. Kota Kazuraba is portrayed by Gaku Sano (佐野 岳, Sano Gaku), who reprises his role from Kamen Rider Gaim.
- Mai Takatsukasa (高司 舞, Takatsukasa Mai): A friend of Kota's and member of Team Gaim. Mai Takatsukasa is portrayed by Yuumi Shida (志田 友美, Shida Yūmi), who reprises her role from Kamen Rider Gaim.
- Mitsuzane Kureshima (呉島 光実, Kureshima Mitsuzane): A friend of Kota and Mai's and member of Team Gaim who usually goes by the nickname "Micchy" (ミッチ, Mitchi). Mitsuzane Kureshima is portrayed by Mahiro Takasugi (高杉 真宙, Takasugi Mahiro), who reprises his role from Kamen Rider Gaim.
- Takatora Kureshima (呉島 貴虎, Kureshima Takatora): Mitsuzane's older brother and a project leader in the Yggdrasil Corporation's R&D branch. Takatora Kureshima is portrayed by Yuki Kubota (久保田 悠来, Kubota Yūki), who reprises his role from Kamen Rider Gaim.
- Narutaki (鳴滝): A mysterious individual, self-proclaimed prophet, and enemy of Kamen Rider Decade's who can freely travel through the multiverse. For reasons unknown, he gives Kota a Rainbow Pass and tells him to send the Conductor and Ticket his regards before disappearing. Narutaki is portrayed by Tatsuhito Okuda (奥田 達士, Okuda Tatsuhito), who reprises his role from Kamen Rider Decade.
- Mikey (マイッキー, Maikki): An imagination-powered shumai toy from Mio's past known for doing the opposite of any command given to him. While Mio is fighting Hammer Shadow, he manifests a human-sized version of Mikey so the Shadow Creep can destroy him and draw darkness from her heart. Despite succeeding, Mio produces light to dispel the shadows before using the full power of her imagination to defeat Hammer Shadow. Following the battle, she is confident Mikey will be waiting for her once the ToQgers find their hometown. Mikey would later reappear during the events of the crossover film Ressha Sentai ToQger vs. Kyoryuger: The Movie to assist Mio in her, the ToQgers, and Kyoryugers' fight against the Shadow Line and Deboth Army. Mikey is voiced by Kumiko Watanabe (渡辺 久美子, Watanabe Kumiko).
- Ryo Knight (リョーナイト, Ryō Naito): A gallant and dependable superhero that Tokatti drew using his older brother Ryo Tokashiki (渡嘉敷 涼, Tokashiki Ryō) as inspiration. Amidst the ToQgers' fight with Pinspo Shadow, Ryo Knight comes to life due to the Shadow Creep's powers and assists the ToQgers in fighting him. All the while, Ryo Knight encourages Tokatti not to panic and to take action more often. Ryo Tokashiki himself later appears after the ToQgers return home. Ryo Knight is voiced by Mizuki Ohno (大野 瑞生, Ōno Mizuki), who also portrays Ryo Tokashiki.

== Spin-off characters ==
- Lady (レディ, Redi): The conductor of the Galaxy Line (ギャラクシーライン, Gyarakushī Rain), a companion to the Rainbow Line that operates in space and uses the Safari Ressha, who first appears in the film Ressha Sentai ToQger the Movie: Galaxy Line S.O.S. Lady is portrayed by Haruka Fukuhara (福原 遥, Fukuhara Haruka).
  - Passko (パス子, Pasuko): Lady's hand puppet assistant, akin to Ticket, who appears exclusively in the film Ressha Sentai ToQger the Movie: Galaxy Line S.O.S. Passko is voiced by M·A·O.
- Count Nair (ナイル伯爵, Nairu-hakushaku): (Note: Count Nair's name comes from the Romansh word for the color black: nair.) A member of the Shadow Line who is charged with expanding their reach into outer space by drowning the Galaxy Line in darkness, wields the Bayonet-Fixed Rifle (着剣系ライフル, Chakken-kei Raifuru), possesses a red Cryner, and appears exclusively in the film Ressha Sentai ToQger the Movie: Galaxy Line S.O.S. After being defeated by the ToQgers via the Safari Ressha, Nair fuses himself with Hound Shadow to become Giant Nair Hounder (巨大ナイルハウンダー, Kyodai Nairu Haundā), gaining the use of the Chain Bear Trap (チェーン系トラバサミ, Chēn-kei Torabasami) and the Crunching Chariot (噛砕系チャリオット, Gōsai-kei Chariotto). Nevertheless, he is killed by ToQ-Oh and SafariGaOh. Count Nair is voiced by Hyadain (ヒャダイン).
- Kaniros (カニロス, Kanirosu): A hand puppet worn by General Schwarz and nemesis of Ticket's who appears exclusively in Ressha Sentai ToQger DVD Special: Farewell, Ticket! The Wasteland Super ToQ Battle!!. After killing Ticket's girlfriend, Jennifer, Kaniros resurfaces in the present to kill Ticket, only to be killed in battle by him. Kaniros is voiced by Tomokazu Seki.
- Dark 0gou (闇の0号, Yami no Zerogō): An entity born from the remains of the Dark Behemoth who resembles Dark ToQ 1gou and appears exclusively in the stage play Ressha Sentai ToQger: Final Live. He creates copies of Nero, Noir, Schwarz, Mork, and Zet to revive the Shadow Line, only for them to be destroyed by the ToQgers. Dark 0gou enters his berserk form, a human-sized version of the Dark Behemoth, but is destroyed by the ToQgers in their Hyper forms. Dark 0gou is voiced by Kenichi Suzumura (鈴村 健一, Suzumura Ken'ichi), who also voices the Dark Behemoth.
- Archduke Hei (ヘイ大公, Hei-taikō): (Note: Archduke Hei's name comes from the Chinese word for the color black: hēi.) A treacherous member of the Shadow Line who wields the Archduke Sabre (大公系サーベル, Taikō-kei Sāberu), possesses the ability to create clones of the Shadow Line's leaders, and appears exclusively in the V-Cinema They Went and Came Back Again Ressha Sentai ToQger: Super ToQ 7gou of Dreams. After being exiled from the Shadow Line sometime prior for attempting to overthrow Zet, Hei resurfaces following Zet's defeat to assume full leadership. While he is defeated by the ToQgers, Hei fakes his death and plots revenge, hoping to strike back once they become adults. However, a time paradox created by Miss Glitta allows the adult ToQgers to regain their imagination and join forces with Akira, Conductor, and their childhood selves to kill Hei. Archduke Hei is voiced by Hiroki Yasumoto (安元 洋貴, Yasumoto Hiroki).
- Dark Doctor Mavro (闇博士マーブロ, Yami Hakase Māburo): (Note: Dark Doctor Mavro's name comes from the Greek word for the color black: mávro.) A mad scientist for the Shadow Line and ninja fanatic who can create Dark Clones (闇クローン, Yami Kurōn) of legendary ninja and appears exclusively in the crossover film Shuriken Sentai Ninninger vs. ToQger the Movie: Ninja in Wonderland. After stealing Takaharu Igasaki's Nintality, Mavro creates Dark Aka Ninger (闇アカニンジャー, Yami Aka Ninjā) to serve him. While he is defeated by Aka Ninger and ToQ 1gou, Mavro combines three Cryner Robos to create a Cho-Cho-Cryner Robo (超超クライナーロボ, Chō Chō Kurainā Robo) for him to pilot, only to be killed by Haoh ToQ Daioh. Dark Doctor Mavro is portrayed by Ryota Yamasato (山里 亮太, Yamasato Ryōta).
