= Ressha Sentai ToQger the Movie: Galaxy Line S.O.S. =

- Theatrical poster

Japanese name
- Kanji: 烈車戦隊トッキュウジャー THE MOVIE ギャラクシーラインSOS
Transcriptions
- Revised Hepburn: Ressha Sentai Tokkyūjā THE MOVIE Gyarakushī Rain SOS
- Directed by: Noboru Takemoto
- Written by: Yasuko Kobayashi
- Based on: Ressha Sentai ToQger by Yasuko Kobayashi
- Produced by: Shōjirō Nakazawa
- Starring: Jun Shison; Jin Hiramaki; Riria Kojima; Ryusei Yokohama; Ai Moritaka; Shin Nagahama
- Music by: Kei Haneoka
- Production company: Toei
- Release date: July 19, 2014 (Japan)
- Running time: 29 minutes
- Country: Japan
- Language: Japanese

Ressha Sentai ToQger the Movie: Galaxy Line S.O.S. (烈車戦隊トッキュウジャー THE MOVIE ギャラクシーラインSOS, Ressha Sentai Tokkyūjā THE MOVIE Gyarakushī Rain SOS) is a Japanese film serving as the theatrical adaptation of the 2014 Super Sentai television series Ressha Sentai ToQger. It was released on July 19, 2014, as a double-billing with Kamen Rider Gaim: Great Soccer Battle! Golden Fruits Cup!. It features the ToQgers helping out Lady, conductor of the Galaxy Line, after she is attacked by Count Nair of the Shadow Line, portrayed by musician Hyadain. Hyadain said that as a child, he enjoyed Dengeki Sentai Changeman, Choushinsei Flashman, and Hikari Sentai Maskman and hoped that he would portray the character well.

The film introduces the Safari Ressha, which transforms into Safari GaOh.

== Plot ==
The Galaxy Line is about to return to Earth after 25 years running in space when it is attacked by a Cryner piloted by Count Nair. Lady, the Galaxy Line conductor, falls on Earth only with the Lion Ressha, while the other Safari Ressha that compose the Galaxy Line go missing, but she is rescued by the ToQgers. While Count Nair pays a visit to Emperor Zet at the Castle Terminal, Right makes a plan to impulse the Lion Ressha back into space by using a local tower as part of a bridge, but Lady points out that there is not enough Imagination on Earth to power it up, claiming that with the decline of space exploration, people stopped aiming at the stars like they used to 50 years ago when the Galaxy Line was established.

Soon after, Count Nair and his partner, the Hound Shadow attack the ToQgers in order to hunt down the Lion Ressha, but while Right flees with Lady, the other four ToQgers stay behind to cover for them. Assisted by Akira, who appears to help them as well, Right runs with the Rainbow Line, dragging the Lion Ressha with it, but there is not enough Imagination to complete the bridge. However, the Fire Ressha uses its extinguisher to create a rainbow, drawing the attention of all the children in the vicinity and inspiring their Imagination, allowing Right to complete the bridge

Now with a way back to space opened, Lady thanks Right and lends him the five Safari Ressha, which the ToQgers use to defeat Count Nair and Hound Shadow. However, the two enlarge and combine, proving themselves too strong for the ToQgers and their Ressha. But Lady returns in time with all five of the Safari Ressha gathered to form Safari GaOh to allow the ToQgers to defeat Count Nair and Hound Shadow for good. After Right returns the Safari Ressha to Lady, she bids farewell to the ToQgers and departs from Earth to start another 25-year-long journey through the stars.

== Cast ==
- Right (ライト, Raito): Jun Shison (志尊 淳, Shison Jun)
- Tokatti (トカッチ, Tokatchi): Jin Hiramaki (平牧 仁, Hiramaki Jin)
- Mio (ミオ): Riria (梨里杏)
- Hikari (ヒカリ): Ryusei Yokohama (横浜 流星, Yokohama Ryūsei)
- Kagura (カグラ): Ai Moritaka (森高 愛, Moritaka Ai)
- Akira Nijino (虹野 明, Nijino Akira): Shin Nagahama (長濱 慎, Nagahama Shin)
- Dark Emperor Zet (闇の皇帝ゼット, Yami no Kōtei Zetto): Kengo Ohkuchi (大口 兼悟, Ōkuchi Kengo)
- Lady (レディ, Redi): Haruka Fukuhara (福原 遥, Fukuhara Haruka)
- Conductor (車掌, Shashō): Tsutomu Sekine (関根 勤, Sekine Tsutomu)
- Ticket (チケット, Chiketto; Voice), ToQger Equipment Voice: Kappei Yamaguchi (山口 勝平, Yamaguchi Kappei)
- Wagon (ワゴン; Voice): Yui Horie (堀江 由衣, Horie Yui)
- Passko (パス子, Pasuko; Voice): M·A·O
- Barone Nero (ネロ男爵, Nero-danshaku; Voice): Jun Fukuyama (福山 潤, Fukuyama Jun)
- Madame Noir (ノア夫人, Noa-fujin; Voice): Aya Hisakawa (久川 綾, Hisakawa Aya)
- General Schwarz (シュバルツ将軍, Shubarutsu-shōgun; Voice): Haruhiko Jō (壤 晴彦, Jō Haruhiko)
- Miss Glitta (グリッタ嬢, Guritta-jō; Voice): Noriko Hidaka (日高 のり子, Hidaka Noriko)
- Count Nair (ナイル伯爵, Nairu-hakushaku): Hyadain (ヒャダイン)
- Hound Shadow (ハウンドシャドー, Haundo Shadō): KENN

== Songs ==
Theme song

- "Ressha Sentai ToQger" (烈車戦隊トッキュウジャー, Ressha Sentai Tokkyūjā)
  - Lyrics: Shio Watanabe (渡部 紫緒, Watanabe Shio)
  - Composition & Arrangement: Go Sakabe (坂部 剛, Sakabe Gō)
  - Artist: Daiki Ise (伊勢 大貴, Ise Daiki)

Insert song

- "Ressha Sentai ToQger Safari" (烈車戦隊トッキュウジャーサファリ, Ressha Sentai Tokkyūjā Safari)
  - Lyrics: Shoko Fujibayashi
  - Composition: Takafumi Iwasaki
  - Arrangement: Takeharu Nakahata
  - Artist: Akira Kushida, Mitsuko Horie

== Promotion ==
To promote the film, Tsutomu Sekine, Jun Shison, and Haruka Fukukara unveiled a special ToQger livery Keikyu train at Shinagawa Station on July 14, 2014.
