= Heisei Rider vs. Shōwa Rider: Kamen Rider Taisen feat. Super Sentai =

Japanese name
- Kanji: 平成ライダー対昭和ライダー 仮面ライダー大戦 feat.スーパー戦隊
Transcriptions
- Revised Hepburn: Heisei Raidā Tai Shōwa Raidā Kamen Raidā Taisen Fīcharingu Sūpā Sentai
- Directed by: Takayuki Shibasaki
- Written by: Shōji Yonemura
- Based on: Kamen Rider Gaim by Gen Urobuchi Kamen Rider by Shotaro Ishinomori
- Produced by: Ishimori Productions; Toei
- Starring: Gaku Sano; Masahiro Inoue; Kento Handa; Renn Kiriyama; Shunya Shiraishi; Ryo Hayami; Shun Sugata; Hiroshi Fujioka; Itsuji Itao; Akiko Hinagata
- Cinematography: Masao Inokuma
- Edited by: Naoki Osada
- Music by: Kōtarō Nakagawa; Kousuke Yamashita
- Production company: Toei
- Distributed by: Toei Co. Ltd
- Release date: March 29, 2014 (Japan)
- Running time: 98 minutes
- Country: Japan
- Language: Japanese
- Box office: US$9.3 Million

Heisei Rider vs. Shōwa Rider: Kamen Rider Taisen feat. Super Sentai (平成ライダー対昭和ライダー 仮面ライダー大戦 feat.スーパー戦隊, Heisei Raidā Tai Shōwa Raidā Kamen Raidā Taisen Fīcharingu Sūpā Sentai) is a Japanese superhero film featuring a crossover within the Kamen Rider Series, as well as the Super Sentai series. Scheduled for release on March 29, 2014, characters from all of the Kamen Rider Series, as far back as 1971's Kamen Rider up through the currently airing series Kamen Rider Gaim appeared, with many of the original actors reprising their roles, including Kamen Rider's Hiroshi Fujioka. The film serves as a 15th anniversary commemoration of the Heisei period run of the Kamen Rider Series, and of Gaim being the 30th main Kamen Rider overall.

The film features a battle between the Kamen Riders from the Shōwa period of Japanese history with the Kamen Riders from the Heisei period, orchestrated by the evil Kamen Rider Fifteen of the Badan Empire who has the powers of the 15 Heisei Kamen Riders at his disposal. Some warriors of the Super Sentai Series also enter the fray in the film's climax scene.

In the lead up to the film, Toei allowed fans to vote on who would win in the film's climactic battle: the Shōwa Riders or the Heisei Riders. On opening day, it was revealed that the Heisei Riders won the vote by a narrow margin. The Shōwa Rider ending initially won the poll but it got an extension that allowed the Heisei ending to take the lead at the end. The ending with the Shōwa Riders winning was also featured on the home video release.

On opening weekend, the weekly broadcasts of ToQger and Gaim were replaced by a one-hour special titled "Ressha Sentai ToQger vs. Kamen Rider Gaim: Spring Break Combined Special" (烈車戦隊トッキュウジャーＶＳ仮面ライダー鎧武春休み合体スペシャル, Ressha Sentai Tokkyūjā Tai Kamen Raidā Gaimu Haruyasumi Gattai Supesharu), serving as a prequel to the events of the film that explains the ToQgers' connection, the cause of the war, and the involvement of Ambassador Darkness and the Badan Empire.

== Plot ==
The film opens with Zawame City ravaged by a fight between the Heisei Riders and the Shōwa Riders, before going back in time to the week before, when workers from the Yggdrasill Corporation are dragged by an unknown force to underground. Upon hearing rumors about it, Kota Kazuraba investigates the area with his friend Mai Takatsukasa, just to fall into a hole as well and find themselves in an underground, alternate version of the city. The two find a boy called Shu, who has the power to revert things and is certain that he has something important to do, but he does not remember what it is. Kota and Mai then bring the boy to the surface and Takeshi Hongo appears demanding them to hand him over, when soldiers from the Underground Badan Empire appear to kidnap him as well and Takeshi transforms into Kamen Rider One to allow Kota, Mai, and Shu to escape. Badan then launches an attack on the surface, and Armored Riders Baron, Ryugen, and Zangetsu Shin appear to fight back alongside Kota, who transforms into Armored Rider Gaim as well to protect his friends. However, Gaim is attacked by Kamen Rider Fifteen, who is also seeking the boy and also possesses a Lockseed that allows him to transform into the Rider Arms of the 15 Heisei Riders, and when Kamen Riders One, Two, and V3 appear to fight him, Shu uses his powers to escape with Gaim and Mai.

Kota and Mai take Shu to Drupers where they meet Tsukasa Kadoya, and Narutaki appears before them as well, affirming that the fifteen Heisei Riders must join forces to stop the Badan Empire, and before leaving, warns them that asking for the Shōwa Riders help is useless as they will refuse to cooperate with them. Tsukasa then departs to gather the other Kamen Riders with Kaito Kumon, while Kota stays behind to take care of Shu. The first Rider they contact is Shotaro Hidari, who refuses to hear their plea before he finishes his job to search for some lost pets. Leaving Kaito behind to help Shotaro with his errand, Tsukasa contacts Takumi Inui who also refuses to help, claiming that his days as a Kamen Rider are over. Kamen Rider Fifteen appears to attack them, and Tsukasa transforms into Kamen Rider Decade to fight him, allowing Takumi and himself to escape harm. Some time later in a ramen shop, Takumi involves himself in an incident where a wounded runaway criminal holds Mari, a high school girl, hostage. Keisuke Jin appears and heals his wounds before convincing him to release Mari and surrender to the police. Takumi then follows Jin to his clinic, where he helps him tend to another patient. Takumi then confides in Jin about how he is haunted by the death of his friend Masato Kusaka and Jin convinces him to stay at his clinic for a while.

The next day, Takumi and Mari are attacked by the Badan Empire. In order to protect her, Takumi decides to fight again as Kamen Rider Faiz, defeating them, but in turn, Jin reveals himself as Kamen Rider X, attacking and defeating Faiz before claiming that he must find his resolve by himself. Meanwhile, Tsukasa finally convinces Shotaro to listen to his request, and asks him about Shu. Elsewhere, Shu finally remembers his past and leads Kota to his house, where it is revealed that Shu has been dead the whole time. Just before his death, he had a fight with his mother, and he now wishes to see her one last time to make amends with her. Kamen Rider Fifteen then appears to take Shu with him, and Kota learns that he is actually Shu's father Ren Aoi. Aoi reveals that the Badan Empire intends to use Shu's powers to power up a machine known as the Mega Reverse, which can make the dead return to life while killing the living, allowing his son to come back to life. While Kamen Rider Gaim fights Kamen Rider Fifteen, Kamen Rider Decade appears and takes Shu to see his mother, but General Jark stands on his way. Kamen Riders Black and Black RX appear to defeat Jark before turning to fight Kamen Rider Decade as well, but Shotaro appears to fight them instead as Kamen Rider Joker and allows Tsukasa to keep escorting the boy. Kamen Rider Baron appears to assist Kamen Rider Joker against the Shōwa Riders while Tsukasa takes Shu to the lighthouse where his mother is staying. But before he can meet her, Kamen Rider Fifteen appears and defeats both Kamen Riders Decade and Gaim with the power of the Heisei Rider Lockseed.

Back in the present day, as the Shōwa and Heisei Riders fight and defeat each other, General Schwarz from the Shadow Line appears to join forces with the Badan Empire, interested in using the Mega Reverse Machine to convert light into darkness to expand the Shadow Line's domains, and sends his Kuliners to attack Kamen Rider Den-O's Den Liner. Kota, Tsukasa, and Takumi join forces with the remaining Heisei Riders and confront the Shōwa Riders about their reasons for attacking them. Kamen Rider One explains that it was all the Heisei Riders fault, as it was their attachment to their deceased important ones that empowered the Badan Empire and allowed the advent of Kamen Rider Fifteen. Meanwhile, Ambassador Darkness, the leader of the Badan forces, reveals himself as Ryo Murasame, who has infiltrated the organization to destroy it from the inside. He betrays the Generalissimo of Badan, apparently destroying the Mega Reverse Machine, but is deceived instead, when the true Mega Reverse Machine is revealed to be the entire Badan Empire base, which takes flight up in the sky. Ryo then reveals that the other Kamen Riders that have supposedly been defeated were in fact been sent to Helheim Forest, and takes the opportunity to summon them back all at once to assist him and Kamen Rider Gaim.

The Heisei and Shōwa Riders confront the Badan Empire helped by Armored Riders Baron, Ryugen, and Zangetsu Shin when the Generalissimo of Badan reveals itself as a giant monster. Daigo Kiryu from the Kyoryugers appears, as well, to fight the monster with Gabutyra, but it proves itself too strong for just his Zyudenryu. Soon after, the ToQgers and Kamen Rider Den-O arrive to assist him, combining their trains with Gabutyra into ToQ-Oh Kyoryuzin feat. DenLiner to destroy the Generalissimo. As Kamen Rider Decade rescues Shu from the Mega Reverse Machine, Haruto Soma and Jin are about to destroy it for good, when they are stopped by Takumi, who wants to atone for Masato's death by allowing him to be revived. However, they convince him that destroying the machine is the right thing to do, and together the three destroy it together as Kamen Riders Wizard, X and Faiz. Kamen Rider One gives Kamen Rider Gaim a special Lockseed containing the powers of the 15 Shōwa Riders, allowing him to transform into One Arms and finally defeat Kamen Rider Fifteen, who returns to his senses. With the Badan Empire all but defeated, the Shōwa Riders use their power to have Shu reunite and reconcile with his parents one last time before passing on to the other side. However, the Shōwa Riders are still in doubt if they can leave the protection of Earth to the Heisei Riders and challenge them to a battle, with Narutaki watching it all from afar. The battle concludes when Kamen Rider Gaim risks himself to protect a single flower from Kamen Rider One's Rider Kick, leading the Shōwa Rider to admit defeat upon realizing his act of kindness. Now truly reconciled, the Shōwa and Heisei Riders then bid farewell to each other and follow their separate ways once more.

In an alternate ending, Kamen Rider Gaim admits defeat instead, as while he prepares a powered up attack to use against Kamen Rider One, he stops after realizing that the Shōwa Rider could attack him before he deploys it. Kamen Rider One still commends him upon realizing his act of kindness, leading the Shōwa and Heisei Riders to reconcile as well.

== Cast ==
Kamen Rider Series cast

- Kota Kazuraba (葛葉 紘汰, Kazuraba Kōta): Gaku Sano (佐野 岳, Sano Gaku)
- Kaito Kumon (駆紋 戒斗, Kumon Kaito): Yutaka Kobayashi (小林 豊, Kobayashi Yutaka)
- Mitsuzane Kureshima (呉島 光実, Kureshima Mitsuzane): Mahiro Takasugi (高杉 真宙, Takasugi Mahiro)
- Takatora Kureshima (呉島 貴虎, Kureshima Takatora), Kamen Rider Shin (仮面ライダーシン, Kamen Raidā Shin; Voice): Yuki Kubota (久保田 悠来, Kubota Yūki)
- Mai Takatsukasa (高司 舞, Takatsukasa Mai): Yuumi Shida (志田 友美, Shida Yūmi)
- Kiyojiro Bando (阪東 清治郎, Bandō Kiyojirō): Tomohisa Yuge (弓削 智久, Yuge Tomohisa)
- Iyo (イヨ): Yui Natsuki (那月 結衣, Natsuki Yui)
- Haruto Soma (操真 晴人, Sōma Haruto): Shunya Shiraishi (白石 隼也, Shiraishi Shun'ya)
- Shotaro Hidari (左 翔太郎, Hidari Shōtarō): Renn Kiriyama (桐山 漣, Kiriyama Ren)
- Tsukasa Kadoya (門矢 士, Kadoya Tsukasa): Masahiro Inoue (井上 正大, Inoue Masahiro)
- Narutaki (鳴滝): Tatsuhito Okuda (奥田 達士, Okuda Tatsuhito)
- Takumi Inui (乾 巧, Inui Takumi), Riderman (ライダーマン, Raidāman; Voice): Kento Handa (半田 健人, Handa Kento)
- Masato Kusaka (草加 雅人, Kusaka Masato): Kohei Murakami (村上 幸平, Murakami Kōhei)
- Ryo Murasame (村雨 良, Murasame Ryō)/Ambassador Darkness (暗闇大使, Kurayami Taishi): Shun Sugata (菅田 俊, Sugata Shun)
- Keisuke Jin (神 敬介, Jin Keisuke): Ryo Hayami (速水 亮, Hayami Ryō)
- Takeshi Hongo (本郷 猛, Hongō Takeshi): Hiroshi Fujioka (藤岡 弘、, Fujioka Hiroshi)

Super Sentai Series cast

- Right (ライト, Raito): Jun Shison (志尊 淳, Shison Jun)
- Tokatti (トカッチ, Tokatchi): Jin Hiramaki (平牧 仁, Hiramaki Jin)
- Mio (ミオ): Riria (梨里杏)
- Hikari (ヒカリ): Ryusei Yokohama (横浜 流星, Yokohama Ryūsei)
- Kagura (カグラ): Ai Moritaka (森高 愛, Moritaka Ai)
- Daigo Kiryu (桐生 ダイゴ, Kiryū Daigo): Ryo Ryusei (竜星 涼, Ryūsei Ryō)

Kamen Rider Taisen-only cast

- Ren Aoi (葵 連, Aoi Ren): Itsuji Itao (板尾 創路, Itao Itsuji)
- Saki Aoi (葵 咲, Aoi Saki): Akiko Hinagata (雛形 あきこ, Hinagata Akiko)
- Shu Aoi (葵 終, Aoi Shū): Yuzu Aoki (青木 柚, Aoki Yuzu)
- Mari (マリ): Ai Miyoshi (三好 杏依, Miyoshi Ai)
- Workers: Kazuo Niibori (新堀 和男, Niibori Kazuo), Seiji Takaiwa (高岩 成二, Takaiwa Seiji)
- Kenji Tominaga (富永 研司, Tominaga Kenji)
- Jiro Okamoto (岡元 次郎, Okamoto Jirō)
- Toshihiro Ogura (おぐら としひろ, Ogura Toshihiro)
- Katsuo Niijima (新島 勝夫, Niijima Katsuo)
- Matsumi Fuku (ふく まつみ, Fuku Matsumi)
- Ryuhei Watabe (渡部 龍平, Watabe Ryūhei)

Miscellaneous voice roles

- ToQger Equipment Voice: Kappei Yamaguchi (山口 勝平, Yamaguchi Kappei)
- General Schwarz (シュバルツ将軍, Shubarutsu-shōgun): Haruhiko Jō (壤 晴彦, Jō Haruhiko)
- Kyoryuger Equipment Voice: Shigeru Chiba (千葉 繁, Chiba Shigeru)
- Kamen Rider Den-O Sword Form (仮面ライダー電王ソードフォーム, Kamen Raidā Den'ō Sōdo Fōmu): Toshihiko Seki (関 俊彦, Seki Toshihiko)
- Drag Visor Voice: Tsuyoshi Koyama (小山 剛志, Koyama Tsuyoshi)
- Faiz Driver Voice: Takehiko Kano (假野 剛彦, Kano Takehiko)
- Blay Rouzer Voice: Takeshi Sasaki (佐々木 健, Sasaki Takeshi)
- Kabuto Zecter Voice: Surage Gajria (スラージ・ガジリア, Surāji Gajiria)
- DecaDriver Voice: Mark Okita (マーク・大喜多, Māku Ōkita)
- Gaia Memory Voice: Fumihiko Tachiki (立木 文彦, Tachiki Fumihiko)
- O Scanner Voice: Akira Kushida (串田 アキラ, Kushida Akira)
- Sengoku Driver Equipment Voice: Seiji Hiratoko (平床 政治, Hiratoko Seiji)
- Genesis Driver Equipment Voice: Shin-ichiro Miki (三木 眞一郎, Miki Shinichirō)
- Kamen Rider Black RX (仮面ライダーBLACK RX, Kamen Raidā Burakku Āru Ekkusu), Kamen Rider Fourze (仮面ライダーフォーゼ, Kamen Raidā Fōze), Yamaarashiroid (ヤマアラシロイド, Yamaarashiroido): Kenichi Suzumura (鈴村 健一, Suzumura Ken'ichi)
- Kamen Rider Two (仮面ライダー2号, Kamen Raidā Nigō), Kamen Rider Super-1 (仮面ライダースーパー1, Kamen Raidā Sūpāwan), Kamen Rider Black (仮面ライダーBLACK, Kamen Raidā Burakku), Kamen Rider Kabuto (仮面ライダーカブト, Kamen Raidā Kabuto): Hiroshi Kamiya (神谷 浩史, Kamiya Hiroshi)
- Kamen Rider V3 (仮面ライダーV3, Kamen Raidā Bui Surī), Kamen Rider Amazon (仮面ライダーアマゾン, Kamen Raidā Amazon), Kamen Rider Stronger (仮面ライダーストロンガー, Kamen Raidā Sutorongā), Marshal Machine (マシーン大元帥, Mashīn Daigensui), Generalissimo of Badan (バダン総統, Badan Sōtō): Tomokazu Seki (関 智一, Seki Tomokazu)
- Kamen Rider J (仮面ライダーJ, Kamen Raidā Jei), Tigeroid (タイガーロイド, Taigāroido), Orphnoch (オルフェノク, Orufenoku): Tetsu Inada (稲田 徹, Inada Tetsu)
- Skyrider (スカイライダー, Sukairaidā), General Shadow (ジェネラルシャドウ, Jeneraru Shadō), General Jark (ジャーク将軍, Jāku-shōgun), Ten-Faced Demon Llumu Qhimil (十面鬼ユム・キミル, Jūmenki Yumu Kimiru): Hideo Ishikawa (石川 英郎, Ishikawa Hideo)
- Kamen Rider Ryuki (仮面ライダー龍騎, Kamen Raidā Ryūki), Shocker Combatant (ショッカー戦闘員, Shokkā Sentōin): Yuuki Anai (穴井 勇輝, Anai Yūki)
- Taketoshi Kawano (川野 剛稔, Kawano Taketoshi)
- Kunihiro Kawamoto (河本 邦弘, Kawamoto Kunihiro)

== Theme song ==
- "Dragon Road 2014" (ドラゴン・ロード2014, Doragon Rōdo Nisenjūyon)
  - Lyrics: Shotaro Ishinomori
  - Composition: Shunsuke Kikuchi
  - Arrangement: Shuhei Naruse
  - Artist: Akira Kushida & Kamen Rider Girls

== Reception ==
As of May 4, 2014, the film has grossed over ¥950 million (over US$9.3 million, approx. £5.6 million, over €6.8 million) in Japan. It earned a total of ¥1.01 billion (US$9.3 million) at the Japanese box office.
