= Senpai to Kanojo =

Japanese manga

- Cover of volume 1

先輩と彼女
- Genre: Romance
- Manga
- Written by: Atsuko Nanba
- Published by: Kodansha
- Magazine: Bessatsu Friend
- Original run: 2004 – 2005 (volume 2)
- Volumes: 2
- Live-action film
- Directed by: Chihiro Ikeda
- Released: October 17, 2015

Senpai to Kanojo (先輩と彼女; lit. "Senior and Her") is a Japanese romance shōjo manga series written and illustrated by Atsuko Nanba. A live action film adaptation was released on October 17, 2015.

== Characters ==
- Keigo Minohara (Jun Shison)
- Rika Tsuzuki (Kyoko Yoshine)
- Aoi Okita (Riria Kojima)
