= Jin Hiramaki =

Japanese actor, singer, and model (born 1987)

- 平牧 仁
- Born: February 26, 1987 (age 39); Tokyo, Japan
- Occupations: Actor, singer, model
- Height: 180 cm (5 ft 11 in)

Jin Hiramaki (平牧 仁, Hiramaki Jin; born February 26, 1987, in Tokyo) is a Japanese actor, singer, and model who was last affiliated with Oscar Promotion. He played the role of Tokatti (ToQ 2gou) in the 2014 38th entry Super Sentai TV series Ressha Sentai ToQger.

In 2007, with Hidemasa Shiozawa and Koki Kato, they joined to the twin vocal unit Sprout. He was in charge as the keyboard vocal in the group. In August of the same year, the group disbanded.

== Biography ==
At the age of three, Hiramaki started learning the electric organ, and began to play it when he was eight. From 2010-2012, Hiramaki appeared as Shuichiro Oishi in the Musical Prince of Tennis Second Season. Until he graduated along with 6th generation Seigaku cast (with the exemption of Ryoma Echizen's actor, Ogoe Yuuki, who continued his role along with the new cast) at Seigaku Farewell Party in 2012. In 2014, he appeared in Ressha Sentai ToQger as Tokatti/ToQ 2gou. Like his role, actors Ryouma Baba from Tokumei Sentai Go-Busters and Yamato Kinjo from Zyuden Sentai Kyoryuger all are the oldest of the cast and Sentai blue rangers born from the Shōwa era.

== Filmography ==
=== TV series ===
Year	Title	Role	Network	Other notes
2014	Ressha Sentai ToQger	Tokatti/ToQ 2gou	TV Asahi	

=== Films ===
Year	Title	Role	Other notes
2014	Zyuden Sentai Kyoryuger vs. Go-Busters: The Great Dinosaur Battle! Farewell Our Eternal Friends	ToQ 2gou (Voice)	
2014	Heisei Rider vs. Shōwa Rider: Kamen Rider Taisen feat. Super Sentai	Tokatti/ToQ 2gou	
2014	Ressha Sentai ToQger the Movie: Galaxy Line S.O.S.	Tokatti/ToQ 2gou	
2015	Ressha Sentai ToQger vs. Kyoryuger: The Movie	Tokatti/ToQ 2gou	

=== Theatre ===
Year	Title	Role
2010–2012	Musical: The Prince of Tennis 2nd Season	Shūichirō Ōishi
2016	Dance With Devils	Lindo Tachibana
2016–2017	Prince of Stride	Reiji Suwa
2017	B-PROJECT on STAGE: OVER the WAVE!	Mikado Sekimura
2017	Mirage of Blaze	Naoe Nobutsuna
2018	Miracle Stage: Sanrio Boys	Naoki Sugami
