= Shin Nagahama =

Japanese actor and model

- 長濱 慎
- Born: September 6, 1985 (age 40); Kanagawa Prefecture, Japan
- Occupations: Actor, model
- Height: 184 cm (6 ft 0 in)

Shin Nagahama (長濱 慎, Nagahama Shin; born September 6, 1985, in Kanagawa Prefecture) is a Japanese actor and model who was last affiliated with Oscar Promotion. He played the role of Akira Nijino (ToQ 6gou) in the 2014 Super Sentai TV series Ressha Sentai ToQger.

== Biography ==
Nagahama was originally affiliated with Beside, which belonged to the office Jinggis, he worked as a model and tarento. In October 2011, he made regular appearances in the television drama Watashi no Host-chan 〜shi chi nin no host〜. In February 2013, Nagahama won the First Kai-bi Businessman & Businesswoman Contest Grand Prix, which belonged to Oscar Promotion. His special skills were street dancing and basketball, and his hobbies were surfing and golf

== Filmography ==
=== TV series ===
Year	Title	Role	Network	Other notes
2014	Ressha Sentai ToQger	Akira Nijino/ToQ 6gou	TV Asahi	

=== Films ===
Year	Title	Role	Other notes
2014	Ressha Sentai ToQger the Movie: Galaxy Line S.O.S.	Akira Nijino/ToQ 6gou	
2015	Ressha Sentai ToQger vs. Kyoryuger: The Movie	Akira Nijino/ToQ 6gou	
