= Ai Moritaka =

Japanese actress and model

Moritaka Ai
- 森高 愛
- Born: January 14, 1998 (age 27); Saitama Prefecture, Japan
- Occupation(s): Actress, model
- Years active: 2011–present
- Height: 156 cm (5 ft 1 in)
- Website: www.tencarat.co.jp/moritakaai

Ai Moritaka (森高 愛, Moritaka Ai; born January 14, 1998, in Saitama Prefecture) is a Japanese actress and model affiliated with the Ten Carat talent agency. She is best known for her role as Kagura (ToQ #5) in the 2014 Super Sentai series Ressha Sentai ToQger.

== Career ==
Moritaka started modeling while still at elementary school. She was an exclusive model for the teenage fashion magazine Love Berry from 2011, and for Pichi Lemon from 2012.

She began her acting career in the 2012 TBS drama Beginners!. She then starred in the NHK drama Gekiryu: Watashi o Oboete Imasu ka? as the female protagonist's young counterpart, before being cast as Kagura Izumi/ToQ #5 in Ressha Sentai ToQger in 2014. In 2019, she would reprise her role for Super Sentai Strongest Battle.

== Filmography ==
=== TV series ===
- Beginners! (TBS / 2012), Manatsu Shimura
- Gekiryu: Watashi o Oboete Imasu ka? (NHK / 2013), Keiko (Misumi) Inoue (teenage years)
- Ressha Sentai ToQger (TV Asahi / 2014), Kagura
- Tantei No Tantei (TV Fuji/2015)

=== Films ===
- Zyuden Sentai Kyoryuger vs. Go-Busters: The Great Dinosaur Battle! Farewell Our Eternal Friends (2014), ToQ #5 (voice)
- Heisei Rider vs. Shōwa Rider: Kamen Rider Taisen feat. Super Sentai (2014), Kagura
- Ressha Sentai ToQger the Movie: Galaxy Line S.O.S. (2014), Kagura
- Ani ni Aisaresugite Komattemasu (2017), Miyu
