= Ankoku Joshi =

2017 Japanese film directed by Saiji Yakumo

- Poster
- Japanese: 暗黒女子
- Directed by: Saiji Yakumo
- Screenplay by: Mari Okada
- Based on: Ankoku Joshi by Rikako Akiyoshi
- Starring: Fumika Shimizu; Marie Iitoyo; Nana Seino; Tina Tamashiro; Riria Kojima; Yuna Taira; Takeshi Masu; Yudai Chiba
- Distributed by: Toei; Showgate
- Release date: 1 April 2017
- Country: Japan
- Language: Japanese

Ankoku Joshi (暗黒女子, The Dark Maidens) is a 2017 Japanese film directed by Saiji Yakumo, written by Mari Okada and starring Fumika Shimizu, Marie Iitoyo, Nana Seino, Tina Tamashiro, Riria Kojima, Yuna Taira, Takeshi Masu and Yudai Chiba. The film is based on the mystery novel of the same name by Rikako Akiyoshi. It was released in Japan by Toei and Showgate on 1 April 2017. Fumika Shimizu, one of the film's stars, joined the new religious movement Happy Science after filming and did not participate in promotional activities for the film's release.

== Cast ==
- Fumika Shimizu as Sayuri Sumikawa
- Marie Iitoyo as Itsumi Shiraishi
- Nana Seino as Shiyo Takaoka
- Tina Tamashiro as Diana Decheva
- Riria Kojima as Akane Kominami
- Yuna Taira as Mirei Nitani
- Takeshi Masu as Itsumi's father
- Yudai Chiba as Teacher Hojo
