= Ressha Sentai ToQger =

Japanese television series

- Genre: Tokusatsu; Superhero fiction Action; Comedy
- Created by: Toei Company; Bandai Visual
- Developed by: Yasuko Kobayashi
- Directed by: Shōjirō Nakazawa
- Starring: Jun Shison; Jin Hiramaki; Riria Kojima; Ryusei Yokohama; Ai Moritaka; Shin Nagahama; Tsutomu Sekine; Kengo Ohkuchi
- Voices of: Kappei Yamaguchi; Yui Horie; Jun Fukuyama; Aya Hisakawa; Haruhiko Jō; Noriko Hidaka; Reiko Suzuki
- Narrated by: Kappei Yamaguchi
- Music by: Kei Haneoka
- Opening theme: "Ressha Sentai ToQger" by Daiki Ise
- Ending theme: "Byun Byun! ToQger" by Project.R (YOFFY, Takayoshi Tanimoto, Shogo Kamada)
- Country of origin: Japan
- Original language: Japanese
- No. of episodes: 47 (list of episodes)

Production
- Producers: Motoi Sasaki (TV Asahi); Takaaki Utsunomiya; Kei Ishikawa (Toei); Koichi Yada (Toei Agency); Akihiro Fukada (Toei Agency)
- Production location: Tokyo, Japan (Greater Tokyo Area)
- Running time: 24–25 minutes
- Production companies: TV Asahi; Toei Company; Toei Agency

Original release
- Network: TV Asahi
- Release: February 16, 2014 – February 15, 2015

Related
- Zyuden Sentai Kyoryuger; Shuriken Sentai Ninninger

Ressha Sentai ToQger (烈車戦隊トッキュウジャー, Ressha Sentai Tokkyūjā; Train Squadron ToQger) is a Japanese television series, a Tokusatsu drama of the 38th installment in Toei Company's Super Sentai metaseries, following Zyuden Sentai Kyoryuger.

It aired on TV Asahi affiliates from February 16, 2014 to February 15, 2015, replacing Zyuden Sentai Kyoryuger and was replaced by Shuriken Sentai Ninninger. The program joined Kamen Rider Gaim and later Kamen Rider Drive in the Super Hero Time programming block. The series has a train motif, and unlike many previous series where the heroes are named after colors, the heroes in ToQger are numbered and also regularly swap colors during battle.

The series' main characters made a cameo appearance in the film Zyuden Sentai Kyoryuger vs. Go-Busters: The Great Dinosaur Battle! Farewell Our Eternal Friends, and appeared in a special meet-and-greet and press conference at Tokyo Dome City in late January 2014. In October 2014, the series was given the Japan Railway Award's Special award by the Ministry of Land, Infrastructure, Transport and Tourism in its annual "Train Day" observance, recognizing its effect on making children enjoy trains.

Two of the series villain costumes and a prop were respectively used for the 24th/25th & 28th/29th seasons of the American Power Rangers series (Power Rangers Ninja Steel / Power Rangers Super Ninja Steel & Power Rangers Dino Fury, which was adapting the 2015 & 2019 Sentai installment, Shuriken Sentai Ninninger & Kishiryu Sentai Ryusoulger).

== Story ==
Only those with a great Imagination (イマジネーション, Imajinēshon) can see the mystical railway known as the Rainbow Line (レインボーライン, Reinbō Rain), on which run massive trains known as Ressha (烈車) (Note: "Ressha" (烈車) is a Japanese play on words, replacing the first kanji in the word for "train" (列車, ressha) with the identically pronounced kanji "烈", which means "extreme" or "fierce" and is found in a word that can be translated as "hero" (烈士, resshi).) These Ressha are driven by five warriors known as the ToQgers (トッキュウジャー, Tokkyūjā), (Note: "ToQger" (トッキュウジャー, Tokkyūjā) a portmanteau of the Japanese words for "limited express train" (特急, tokkyū) and "Ranger" (レンジャー, Renjā).) It is their mission to save towns from the evil forces of the Shadow Line (シャドーライン, Shadō Rain) who are using the residents' fear and sadness to establish their own railway to enable the coming of their leader Emperor Zet, whose intention is to consume light to plunge the world into darkness. The five ToQgers are also childhood friends who are fighting to recover the memories of their hometown after it was consumed by the Shadow Line's evil. Later joined by Akira Nijino, a former Shadow Creep who reformed, the ToQgers begin a campaign to free these "Shadow Towns" from their Shadow Creep Keepers in an attempt to recover their memories while the Shadow Line itself must deal with some opposition among their own subjects.

== Episodes ==
As the motif for ToQger is trains, the episodes are called "stations" (駅, eki).

No.	Title	Written by	Original release date
1	"Let's Go on the Express Ressha"; Transliteration: "Tokkyū Ressha de Ikō" (Japanese: 特急烈車で行こう)	Yasuko Kobayashi	February 16, 2014
2	"We Are Here"; Transliteration: "Oretachi wa Koko ni Iru" (Japanese: 俺たちはここにいる)	Yasuko Kobayashi	February 23, 2014
3	"Risking Everything After Reaching the Wrong Conclusion"; Transliteration: "Omoikondara Inochigake" (Japanese: 思いこんだら命がけ)	Yasuko Kobayashi	March 2, 2014
4	"Be Careful Not to Lose Anything"; Transliteration: "Wasuremono ni Gochūi o" (Japanese: 忘れ物にご注意を)	Yasuko Kobayashi	March 9, 2014
5	"The Missing Other Side of the Tracks"; Transliteration: "Kieta Senro no Mukōgawa" (Japanese: 消えた線路の向こうがわ)	Yasuko Kobayashi	March 16, 2014
6	"What Are We Looking For?"; Transliteration: "Sagashimono wa Nan Desu ka" (Japanese: 探し物はなんですか)	Yasuko Kobayashi	March 23, 2014
SP	"Ressha Sentai ToQger vs. Kamen Rider Gaim: Spring Break Combined Special"; Transliteration: "Ressha Sentai Tokkyūjā Tai Kamen Raidā Gaimu Haruyasumi Gattai Supesharu" (Japanese: 烈車戦隊トッキュウジャーＶＳ仮面ライダー鎧武 春休み合体スペシャル)	Nobuhiro Mouri	March 30, 2014
7	"Inconsolable, Unmotivatable"; Transliteration: "Yarusenaku, Yarukinaku" (Japanese: やるせなく、やる気なく)	Yasuko Kobayashi	April 6, 2014
8	"Big Explosion on the Rainbow Line"; Transliteration: "Reinbō Rain Daibakuha" (Japanese: レインボーライン大爆破)	Yasuko Kobayashi	April 13, 2014
9	"Memory Is a One-Way Ticket"; Transliteration: "Omoi wa Katamichi Kippu" (Japanese: 思いは片道切符)	Yasuko Kobayashi	April 20, 2014
10	"Tokatti Dies at Sunset"; Transliteration: "Tokatchi, Yūyake ni Shisu" (Japanese: トカッチ、夕焼けに死す)	Yasuko Kobayashi	April 27, 2014
11	"The Dark Emperor"; Transliteration: "Yami no Kōtei" (Japanese: 闇の皇帝)	Yasuko Kobayashi	May 4, 2014
12	"The Rainbow Commuter Pass"; Transliteration: "Niji no Teikiken" (Japanese: 虹の定期券)	Yasuko Kobayashi	May 11, 2014
13	"Run Fire Extinguisher"; Transliteration: "Hashire Shōkaki" (Japanese: 走れ消火器)	Akatsuki Yamatoya	May 18, 2014
14	"Lost Cop, Great Detective"; Transliteration: "Meikeiji, Meitantei" (Japanese: 迷刑事、名探偵)	Akatsuki Yamatoya	May 25, 2014
15	"The Thing In Your Heart"; Transliteration: "Kokoro no Naka ni Aru Mono" (Japanese: 心の中にあるもの)	Shō Aikawa	June 1, 2014
16	"The Dangerous Extraordinary Ressha"; Transliteration: "Kiken na Rinji Ressha" (Japanese: 危険な臨時烈車)	Shō Aikawa	June 8, 2014
17	"The Sky After the Rain"; Transliteration: "Ameagari no Sora ni" (Japanese: 雨上がりの空に)	Yasuko Kobayashi	June 22, 2014
18	"And What Do We Call You?"; Transliteration: "Kimi no Na o Yobeba" (Japanese: 君の名を呼べば)	Yasuko Kobayashi	June 29, 2014
19	"Now Departing! Build DaiOh"; Transliteration: "Shuppatsu! Birudo Daiō" (Japanese: 出発！ビルドダイオー)	Yasuko Kobayashi	July 6, 2014
20	"Smiling Is Dangerous"; Transliteration: "Egao wa Kiken" (Japanese: 笑顔は危険)	Yasuko Kobayashi	July 13, 2014
21	"The Runaway Bride"; Transliteration: "Hanayome wa Tōsōchū" (Japanese: 花嫁は逃走中)	Yasuko Kobayashi	July 20, 2014
22	"Birth of the Empress"; Transliteration: "Jotei no Tanjō" (Japanese: 女帝の誕生)	Yasuko Kobayashi	July 27, 2014
23	"United Hand in Hand"; Transliteration: "Te to Te o Tsunai de" (Japanese: 手と手をつないで)	Yasuko Kobayashi	August 10, 2014
24	"Pass the Junction"; Transliteration: "Bunkiten o Koete" (Japanese: 分岐点を越えて)	Yasuko Kobayashi	August 17, 2014
25	"Right Out of a Fairy Tale"; Transliteration: "Otogibanashi ga Tobidashite" (Japanese: おとぎ話が飛び出して)	Yasuko Kobayashi	August 24, 2014
26	"The Fight that Started in a Bathhouse"; Transliteration: "Sentō de Sentō Kaishi" (Japanese: 銭湯で戦闘開始)	Akatsuki Yamatoya	August 31, 2014
27	"A New Power"; Transliteration: "Arata na Chikara o" (Japanese: 新たな力を)	Yasuko Kobayashi	September 7, 2014
28	"Uncool but Cool"; Transliteration: "Kakko Warui ga Kakko Ii" (Japanese: カッコ悪いがカッコ良い)	Yasuko Kobayashi	September 14, 2014
29	"The Meeting with the Oncoming Train"; Transliteration: "Taikōsha to no Gōryūten" (Japanese: 対向車との合流点)	Akatsuki Yamatoya	September 21, 2014
30	"The Birthday Celebration"; Transliteration: "Tanjōbi no Oiwai wa" (Japanese: 誕生日のお祝いは)	Akatsuki Yamatoya	September 28, 2014
31	"The Hyper Ressha Terminal"; Transliteration: "Haipā Ressha Tāminaru" (Japanese: ハイパーレッシャターミナル)	Yasuko Kobayashi	October 5, 2014
32	"Determination"; Transliteration: "Ketsui" (Japanese: 決意)	Yasuko Kobayashi	October 12, 2014
33	"Karate Hot Match"; Transliteration: "Karate Ōichiban" (Japanese: カラテ大一番)	Yasuko Kobayashi	October 19, 2014
34	"Love Furor"; Transliteration: "Koi wa Ōsawagi" (Japanese: 恋は大騒ぎ)	Akatsuki Yamatoya	October 26, 2014
35	"The Stolen Terminal"; Transliteration: "Ubawareta Tāminaru" (Japanese: 奪われたターミナル)	Yasuko Kobayashi	November 9, 2014
36	"A+ Dream"; Transliteration: "Yume wa Hyakuten" (Japanese: 夢は100点)	Shō Aikawa	November 16, 2014
37	"Unreasonable Quiz"; Transliteration: "Rifujin Kuizu" (Japanese: 理不尽クイズ)	Akatsuki Yamatoya	November 23, 2014
38	"Let's Make a Movie"; Transliteration: "Eiga Tsukurō" (Japanese: 映画つくろう)	Akatsuki Yamatoya	November 30, 2014
39	"The Beginning of the End"; Transliteration: "Owari no Hajimari" (Japanese: 終わりの始まり)	Yasuko Kobayashi	December 7, 2014
40	"Who Is He? He Is Whom?"; Transliteration: "Dare ga Aitsu de, Aitsu ga Dare de" (Japanese: 誰があいつで あいつが誰で)	Yasuko Kobayashi	December 14, 2014
41	"The Christmas Battle"; Transliteration: "Kurisumasu Daikessen" (Japanese: クリスマス大決戦)	Yasuko Kobayashi	December 21, 2014
42	"Words to Reach You"; Transliteration: "Kimi ni Todoku Kotoba" (Japanese: 君に届く言葉)	Yasuko Kobayashi	December 28, 2014
43	"The Locked Door"; Transliteration: "Akanai Tobira" (Japanese: 開かない扉)	Yasuko Kobayashi	January 11, 2015
44	"To Subarugahama"; Transliteration: "Subarugahama e" (Japanese: 昴ヶ浜へ)	Yasuko Kobayashi	January 18, 2015
45	"The Home We Left Behind"; Transliteration: "Kimi ga Satta Hōmu" (Japanese: 君が去ったホーム)	Yasuko Kobayashi	January 25, 2015
46	"The Last Stop"; Transliteration: "Saigo no Ikisaki" (Japanese: 最後の行き先)	Yasuko Kobayashi	February 8, 2015 (Note: Episode 46 was originally scheduled to air on February 1, 2015. However, TV Asahi postponed the airing due to the media coverage of the death of Japanese journalist Kenji Goto by the Islamic State of Iraq and the Levant.)
47 (Final)	"A Shining Thing"; Transliteration: "Kagayaiteiru Mono" (Japanese: 輝いているもの)	Yasuko Kobayashi	February 15, 2015

== Production ==
The trademark for the series was filed by Toei Company on August 30, 2013.

== Films ==
The ToQgers made their first appearance as a cameo in the crossover film Zyuden Sentai Kyoryuger vs. Go-Busters: The Great Dinosaur Battle! Farewell Our Eternal Friends.

=== Theatrical ===
==== Kamen Rider Taisen ====
The main casts from Ressha Sentai ToQger and Kamen Rider Gaim, along with Ryo Ryusei who returns as Daigo Kiryu from Zyuden Sentai Kyoryuger participate in Heisei Rider vs. Shōwa Rider: Kamen Rider Taisen feat. Super Sentai (平成ライダー対昭和ライダー 仮面ライダー大戦 feat.スーパー戦隊, Heisei Raidā Tai Shōwa Raidā Kamen Raidā Taisen feat. Sūpā Sentai) which debuted in theaters on March 29, 2014. It also features the return of characters from previous Kamen Rider Series, most notably Hiroshi Fujioka of the original Kamen Rider. The event of the movie takes place between Station 6 and 7.

==== Galaxy Line S.O.S. ====
Ressha Sentai ToQger the Movie: Galaxy Line S.O.S. (烈車戦隊トッキュウジャー THE MOVIE ギャラクシーラインSOS, Ressha Sentai Tokkyūjā THE MOVIE Gyarakushī Rain SOS) was released in Japanese theaters on July 19, 2014, double-billed with Kamen Rider Gaim: Great Soccer Battle! Golden Fruits Cup!. It features the introduction of the Safari Ressha (サファリ烈車). The event of the movie takes place between Station 20 and 21.

==== ToQger vs. Kyoryuger ====
Ressha Sentai ToQger vs. Kyoryuger: The Movie (烈車戦隊トッキュウジャーVSキョウリュウジャーTHE MOVIE, Ressha Sentai Tokkyūjā Tai Kyōryūjā Za Mūbī) is the VS team-up movie between Ressha Sentai ToQger and Zyuden Sentai Kyoryuger & The heroes of Shuriken Sentai Ninninger also make a cameo appearance in the film. The film premiered in Japanese theaters on January 17, 2015. The event of the movie takes place between Station 35 and 36.

==== Ninninger vs. ToQger ====
Shuriken Sentai Ninninger vs. ToQger the Movie: Ninja in Wonderland (手裏剣戦隊ニンニンジャーVSトッキュウジャー THE MOVIE 忍者・イン・ワンダーランド, Shuriken Sentai Ninninjā Tai Tokkyūjā Za Mūbī Ninja In Wandārando) was released in Japanese theaters on January 23, 2016, featuring the casts of both Shuriken Sentai Ninninger and ToQger.

=== V-Cinema ===
They Went and Came Back Again Ressha Sentai ToQGer: Super ToQ 7gou of Dreams (行って帰ってきた烈車戦隊トッキュウジャー 夢の超トッキュウ7号, Itte Kaettekita Ressha Sentai Tokkyūjā Yume no Chō Tokkyū Nanagō) is a direct-to-video film to be released on June 24, 2015. Ten years after the events of the series, the fully grown up ToQgers find themselves being attacked by the Shadow Line before ending up sent back through time to the year 2017 on the day before their graduation when their childhood selves set out to find Akira. But the childhood ToQgers find themselves meeting the mysterious ToQ 7gou (トッキュウ7号, Tokkyū Nanagō) while facing the Shadow Line's new leader Archduke Hei, who attempts to turn Akira back to Zalam with help from the 6th ToQger's silent partner Tanktop Shadow. But the ToQgers, regaining their lost Imagination in the process, help their childhood selves save Akira and redeem Tanktop Shadow with Hei going into hiding to have his revenge on the powerless ToQgers in eight years' time. Luckily, the time paradox caused by Glitta allowed the ToQgers to retain their regained Imagination while they are joined by Akira, the childhood ToQgers and Conductor as ToQ 7gou in finishing Hei for good. The event of the movie takes place after the final episode of the series.

== Item ==
Tokkyū Changer（トッキュウチェンジャー）

Tokkyū Blaster（トッキュウブラスター）

Tokkyū Buckle（トッキュウバックル）

Appli Changer（アプリチェンジャー）

Yūdō Breaker（ユウドウブレイカー）

Rail Slasher（レールスラッシャー）

Home Trigger（ホームトリガー）

Shingō Hammer（シンゴウハンマー）

Tunnel Ax（トンネルアックス）

Tekkyō Claw（テッキョウクロー）

Renketsu Bazooka（レンケツバズーカ）

Daikaiten Cannon（ダイカイテンキャノン）

Tokkyū Rescher（トッキュウレッシャー）

== Cast ==
- Right (ライト, Raito): Jun Shison (志尊 淳, Shison Jun), Homare Mabuchi (馬渕 誉, Mabuchi Homare; Child)
- Tokatti (トカッチ, Tokatchi): Jin Hiramaki (平牧 仁, Hiramaki Jin), Keishiro Nagase (永瀬 圭志朗, Nagase Keishirō; Child)
- Mio (ミオ): Riria (梨里杏), Kaoruko Ishii (石井 薫子, Ishii Kaoruko; Child)
- Hikari (ヒカリ): Ryusei Yokohama (横浜 流星, Yokohama Ryūsei), Hikaru Yamazaki (山﨑 光, Yamazaki Hikaru; Child)
- Kagura (カグラ): Ai Moritaka (森高 愛, Moritaka Ai), Rara Shimizu (清水 らら, Shimizu Rara; Child)
- Akira Nijino (虹野 明, Nijino Akira): Shin Nagahama (長濱 慎, Nagahama Shin)
- Conductor (車掌, Shashō): Tsutomu Sekine (関根 勤, Sekine Tsutomu)
- Dark Emperor Zet (闇の皇帝ゼット, Yami no Kōtei Zetto): Kengo Ohkuchi (大口 兼悟, Ōkuchi Kengo)

=== Voice cast ===
- Narrator, Ticket (チケット, Chiketto), ToQger Equipment: Kappei Yamaguchi (山口 勝平, Yamaguchi Kappei)
- Wagon (ワゴン): Yui Horie (堀江 由衣, Horie Yui)
- Rainbow Line President (レインボーライン総裁, Reinbō Rain Sōsai): Kōsuke Toriumi (鳥海 浩輔, Toriumi Kōsuke)
- Barone Nero (ネロ男爵, Nero-danshaku): Jun Fukuyama (福山 潤, Fukuyama Jun)
- Madame Noir (ノア夫人, Noa-fujin): Aya Hisakawa (久川 綾, Hisakawa Aya)
- General Schwarz (シュバルツ将軍, Shubarutsu-shōgun): Haruhiko Jō (壤 晴彦, Jō Haruhiko)
- Miss Glitta (グリッタ嬢, Guritta-jō): Noriko Hidaka (日高 のり子, Hidaka Noriko)
- Marchioness Mork (モルク侯爵, Moruku-kōshaku), Cryner (クライナー, Kurainā) Announcements: Reiko Suzuki (鈴木 れい子, Suzuki Reiko).

=== Guest cast ===
- Tooru Chiba (千葉 徹, Chiba Tōru; 9): Sotaro (聡太郎, Sōtarō)
- Gonzaemon Toride (取手 権左衛門, Toride Gonzaemon; 14): Hiroyuki Konishi (小西 博之, Konishi Hiroyuki)
- Sumo Wrestler (相撲取り, Sumōtori; 20): Akatsu (あかつ)
- Comedian (芸人, Geinin; 20): Gorgeous (ゴー☆ジャス, Gōjasu)
- Ryo Tokashiki (渡嘉敷 涼, Tokashiki Ryō; 23, 25, 45, 47): Mizuki Ohno (大野 瑞生, Ōno Mizuki)
- Naked Emperor (はだかの王様, Hadaka no Ōsama; 25): John Kaminari (ジョン・カミナリ, Jon Kaminari)
- Owner of Sentō (銭湯の店主, Sentō no Tenshu; 26): Ken Nishida (西田 健, Nishida Ken)
- Teruo Inzai (印西 輝男, Inzai Teruo; 26): Masahiro Kuranuki (倉貫 匡弘, Kuranuki Masahiro)
- Taihei Kasuga (春日 太平, Kasuga Taihei; 33): Ryo Kinomoto (木之元 亮, Kinomoto Ryō)
- Tsuyoshi Suzuki (鈴樹 剛史, Suzuki Tsuyoshi; 33, 45-47): Takashi Inoue (井上 高志, Inoue Takashi)
- Yoshio Omotesando (表参道 義雄, Yoshio Omotesandō; 34): Makoto Sakamoto (坂本 真, Sakamoto Makoto)
- Sakura Igawa (井川 さくら, Igawa Sakura; 36): Erica Tonooka (外岡 えりか, Tonooka Erika)
- Railway Maintenance Crew Band (保線員バンド, Hosenin Bando; 42)
  - Vocal: Daiki Ise (伊勢 大貴, Ise Daiki)
  - Guitar: Mitsuhiro Ayano|AYANO (of FULL AHEAD)
  - Bass: Shō (翔)
  - Drums: Senri Kawaguchi (川口 千里, Kawaguchi Senri)
- Ayaka Nonomura (野々村 彩香, Nonomura Ayaka; 43, 45, 47):
- Hitomi Hasebe (長谷部 瞳, Hasebe Hitomi)

== Theme songs ==
Opening theme

- "Ressha Sentai ToQger" (烈車戦隊トッキュウジャー, Ressha Sentai Tokkyūjā)
  - Lyrics: Shio Watanabe (渡部 紫緒, Watanabe Shio)
  - Composition & Arrangement: Go Sakabe (坂部 剛, Sakabe Gō)
  - Artist: Daiki Ise (伊勢 大貴, Ise Daiki)

Ending theme

- "Byun Byun! ToQger" (ビュンビュン!トッキュウジャー, Byun Byun! Tokkyūjā)
  - Lyrics: Shoko Fujibayashi
  - Composition: Shunryū (俊龍)
  - Arrangement: Go Sakabe
  - Artist: Project.R (YOFFY, Takayoshi Tanimoto, Shogo Kamada)
