= Kengo Ohkuchi =

Japanese actor (born 1981)

- 大口兼悟
- Born: November 9, 1981 (age 44); Kagoshima Prefecture, Japan
- Occupation: Actor
- Years active: 2003 - 2016
- Notable credit(s): Ressha Sentai ToQger as Emperor Z, Rock Musical BLEACH as Sousuke Aizen
- Height: 180 cm (5 ft 11 in)

Kengo Ohkuchi (大口兼悟, Ōkuchi Kengo; born November 9, 1981) is a former Japanese actor born in Kagoshima Prefecture. He is 180 cm tall and weighs 62 kg. He specializes in Shorinji Kempo.

Ohkuchi is best known for playing Emperor Z, the main villain of the Tokusatsu series Ressha Sentai ToQger. He also portrayed Sousuke Aizen in the Rock Musical BLEACH series, and he filled in for Eiji Takigawa in the role of Kunimitsu Tezuka in Tenimyu, the Prince of Tennis musical series, in the More Than Limit: St. Rudolph Gakuen musical. In August 2016, Ohkuchi announced his retirement as an actor.

== Filmography ==
=== Television ===
- "Dokushinsan!!" (独身3!!) (2003 ANB)
- "Kindan no rakuen" (禁断の楽園) (2003 CX)
- Kamen Rider 555 (2003) - Kazufumi Mizuno
- Umizaru (2005 CX)
- Engine (2005 CX)
- Mito Kōmon (2005 TBS) (Part 34 Episode 15)
- "Koinokarasawagi dorama supesharu III nidai ni nose rareta on'na" (恋のから騒ぎドラマスペシャルIII・荷台に乗せられた女) (2006 NTV)
- "Dansō no reijin ~ kawashima yoshiko no shōgai ~" (男装の麗人～川島芳子の生涯～) (2008 EX)
- "Men ☆ doru 〜 ikemen'aidoru 〜" (メン☆ドル 〜イケメンアイドル〜) (2008 TX) - Katsuyuki Miyoshi
- Here Is Greenwood (2008 MX) - Kazuhiro Hasukawa
- "Koko wa gurīn uddo ~ seishun dansei ryō nisshi ~" (ここはグリーン・ウッド～青春男性寮日誌～) (2008 MX)
- Smile (2009 TBS)
- Joo Virgin (2009, TV Tokyo) -Sakuragi Takashi
- "Matsumoto seichō seitan 100 nenkinen sakuhin dorama 'ekiro' " (松本清張生誕100年記念作品ドラマ「駅路」) (2009 CX)
- Parenting Play (子育てプレイ, Kosodate purei) (2009 MBS)
- Ressha Sentai ToQger (2014) - Emperor Zett
- Konkatsu Deka (2015, NTV) - Episode 8, Mine Ryosuke

=== Film ===
- "Bakko yōkai-den kibakichi" (跋扈妖怪伝 牙吉) (2004)
- "Sarutobisasuke yami no gundan" (猿飛佐助 闇の軍団) (2004)
- Umizaru (2004), Gunji Kensuke
- AOGRA (2006), Takashiro Shingo
- Sakugoe (2007), Yasuda
- Crows Zero 2 (2009), Rikiya Kumagiri
- BADBOYS (2010), Yoji Kawanaka
- Kamen Rider × Kamen Rider OOO & W feat. Skull: Movie War Core (2010), Nobunaga
- Thanatos (2011)
- Very Small Love (2013), Keiji
- Super Sentai Series as Zett, Emperor of Darkness
  - Ressha Sentai ToQger THE MOVIE Galaxy Line SOS (2014)
  - Ressha Sentai ToQger VS Kyoryuger THE MOVIE (2015)
- A Summer Day, Your Voice, Tetsuo Tagami
- Reunion Forbidden Adult Love, Koji Miyazawa

=== Theatre ===
- Rock Musical BLEACH series (as Sousuke Aizen)
  - Rock Musical BLEACH (August 2005)
  - Rock Musical BLEACH Saien (January 2006)
  - Rock Musical BLEACH The Dark of the Bleeding Moon (August 2006)
  - Rock Musical BLEACH Live Bankai Show Code 001 (January 2007)
  - Rock Musical BLEACH No Clouds in the Blue Heaven (March - April 2007)
  - Rock Musical BLEACH Live Bankai Show Code 002 (2008)
- TENIMYU: The Prince of Tennis Musical series (as Kunimitsu Tezuka)
  - More Than Limit St. Rudolph Gakuen (July - August 2004)

== TV Commercials / Advertisements ==
- CASIO 携帯電話
