= Haruhiko Jō =

Japanese actor and theatre director

- Born: January 25, 1948 (age 78); Kyoto, Japan
- Occupations: Actor, theater director, voice actor

Haruhiko Jō (壤晴彦, Jō Haruhiko; born January 25, 1948) is a Japanese actor, theatre director, and voice actor, currently affiliated with Engekikurabu Za.

== Roles ==
=== Television drama ===
- Yoshitsune (2005)
- Onward Towards Our Noble Deaths (2007) (Chief of Staff)

=== Theatre ===
- Rudolf (2008) (Emperor Franz-Joseph)

=== Television animation ===
- Crest of the Stars (1999) (Narrator)
- Lost Chapter of the Stars: Birth (2000) (Narrator)
- Banner of the Stars (2000) (Narrator)
- Banner of the Stars II (2001) (Narrator)
- X-Men (2011) (Mastermind)
- Yu-Gi-Oh! Zexal (2013) (Don Thousand)
- One Piece (2017) (Streusen)

=== Original video animation ===
- Sol Bianca: The Legacy (1999) (Gyunter)

=== Theatrical animation ===
- Case Closed: The Last Wizard of the Century (1999) (Sergei Ovchinnikov)
- Heisei Rider vs. Shōwa Rider: Kamen Rider Taisen feat. Super Sentai (2014) (General Schwarz)
- Ressha Sentai ToQger the Movie: Galaxy Line S.O.S. (2014) (General Schwarz)
- Ressha Sentai ToQger vs. Kyoryuger: The Movie (2015) (General Schwarz)

=== Video games ===
- Kingdom Hearts II (2005) (Scar, Hector Barbossa)
- Lost Odyssey (2007) (Gongora)
- God of War III (2010) (Zeus)
- Kingdom Hearts III (2019) (Hector Barbossa)

=== Dubbing ===
==== Live-action ====
- Geoffrey Rush
  - Shakespeare in Love (Philip Henslowe)
  - Pirates of the Caribbean: The Curse of the Black Pearl (Hector Barbossa)
  - Pirates of the Caribbean: Dead Man's Chest (Hector Barbossa)
  - Pirates of the Caribbean: At World's End (Hector Barbossa)
  - The King's Speech (Lionel Logue)
  - Pirates of the Caribbean: On Stranger Tides (Hector Barbossa)
  - Pirates of the Caribbean: Dead Men Tell No Tales (Hector Barbossa)
- J. K. Simmons
  - Whiplash (Terence Fletcher)
  - The Accountant (Raymond "Ray" King)
  - La La Land (Bill)
  - Counterpart (Howard Silk)
- Jeff Bridges
  - Iron Man (2011 TV Asahi edition) (Obadiah Stane)
  - Crazy Heart (Otis "Bad" Blake)
  - R.I.P.D. (Roycephus "Roy" Pulsipher)
- 24 (Victor Drazen (Dennis Hopper))
- Ant-Man and the Wasp (Bill Foster (Laurence Fishburne))
- The Assignment (Jack Shaw (Donald Sutherland))
- The Autopsy of Jane Doe (Tommy Tilden (Brian Cox))
- Bedknobs and Broomsticks (Mr. Emelius Browne (David Tomlinson))
- The Big Blue (Enzo Molinari (Jean Reno))
- Blood and Wine (Alex Gates (Jack Nicholson))
- Changeling (Rev. Gustav Briegleb (John Malkovich))
- The Chronicles of Narnia: Prince Caspian (Miraz (Sergio Castellitto))
- Con Air (Cyrus "The Virus" Grissom (John Malkovich))
- Conan the Barbarian (NTV edition) (Conan (Arnold Schwarzenegger))
- The Cook, the Thief, His Wife & Her Lover (Albert Spica (Michael Gambon))
- The Cotton Club (Owney Madden (Bob Hoskins))
- Entrapment (Conrad Greene (Maury Chaykin))
- Executive Decision (Nagi Hassan (David Suchet))
- Flood (Deputy Prime Minister Campbell (David Suchet))
- Garm Wars: The Last Druid (Wydd (Lance Henriksen))
- Justice League (Steppenwolf (Ciarán Hinds))
- The King and I (TV Tokyo edition) (King Mongkut of Siam (Yul Brynner))
- The Mummy: Tomb of the Dragon Emperor (TV edition) (General Yang (Anthony Wong))
- Royal Pains (Boris Kuester von Jurgens-Ratenicz (Campbell Scott))
- Star Trek II: The Wrath of Khan (NTV edition) (Captain Clark Terrell (Paul Winfield))
- Star Wars: The Force Awakens (Supreme Leader Snoke (Andy Serkis))
- Star Wars: The Last Jedi (Supreme Leader Snoke (Andy Serkis))
- There Will Be Blood (Daniel Plainview (Daniel Day-Lewis))
- Transformers: Dark of the Moon
- UC: Undercover (Jack "Sonny" Walker (William Forsythe))
- X-Men: The Last Stand (TV edition) (Beast (Kelsey Grammer))
- Zack Snyder's Justice League (Steppenwolf (Ciarán Hinds))

==== Animation ====
- All Dogs Go to Heaven 2 (Red)
- Aladdin and the King of Thieves (Sa'luk)
- Anastasia (Grigori Rasputin)
- Beauty and the Beast: The Enchanted Christmas (Forte)
- A Bug's Life (Hopper)
- Frankenweenie (Mr. Rzykruski)
- Guillermo del Toro's Pinocchio (Podestà)
- Help! I'm a Fish (Joe)
- House of Mouse (Scar)
- Ice Age (Soto)
- The Little Prince (The Academy Teacher)
- The Lion King (Scar)
- The Pebble and the Penguin (Drake)
- The Swan Princess II: Escape from Castle Mountain (Clavius the Magic-Shaper)

=== Dark ride ===
- Pirates of the Caribbean (Hector Barbossa)
