= Jun Shison =

Japanese actor

- 志尊 淳
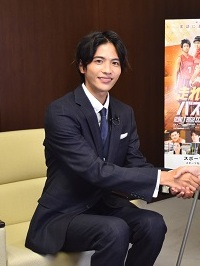
- Jun Shison in 2018
- Born: March 5, 1995 (age 31); Tokyo, Japan
- Occupation: Actor
- Years active: 2011–present

Jun Shison (志尊 淳, Shison Jun; born March 5, 1995 in Tokyo) is a Japanese actor. He was associated with Watanabe Entertainment's male acting troupe D2 (later merged into D-Boys) from 2011 to 2023 and made his acting debut in Musical: The Prince of Tennis.

== Career ==
Shison joined the D2 actor group (now merged with D-Boys) in 2011. He made his acting debut in The Prince of Tennis stage musical that same year.

In 2015, he played his first starring role in the live action film adaptation of popular romance manga series Senpai to Kanojo. In 2019, he starred in the spin-off film to the High&Low franchise, High&Low The Worst, and its sequel High&Low The Worst X. In 2022, he was announced as the role of Kurama in Netflix's YuYu Hakusho live-action adaptation.

In 2023, Shison was cast in the cooking drama Fermat's Cuisine, starring Fumiya Takahashi, and based on the manga series by Yūgo Kobayashi. He portrayed the character of Kai Asakura, a culinary prodigy who serves as the charismatic and enigmatic owner of Restaurant K.

On November 16, 2023, Shison was appointed as the official ambassador for the Persona video game series. He subsequently appeared in a commercial for Persona 5 Royal on December 15, 2023.

On December 31, 2023, Shison left the agency after 12 years and is currently working independently.

== Filmography ==
=== Television ===
Year	Title	Role	Notes	Ref.
2014–2015	Ressha Sentai ToQger	Right/ToQ 1gou	Lead role	
2020	Detective Yuri Rintaro	Shunsuke Mitsugi		
2020	The Way of the Househusband	Masa		
2021	Reach Beyond the Blue Sky	Sugiura Aizō (Yuzuru)	Taiga drama	
2023	Ranman	Takeo	Asadora	
2023	Fermat's Cuisine	Kai Asakura	Lead role	
2023	YuYu Hakusho	Kurama		
2024	Bakuage Sentai Boonboomger	Right/ToQ 1gou	Episode 32	
2025	Glass Heart	Kazushi Sakamoto		
2025	Japan's Number One Jerk Salaryman	Shosuke Kohara		
2025	Murderous Encounter	Hiroki Shitara	Lead role	

=== Film ===
Year	Title	Role	Notes	Ref.
2015	Ressha Sentai ToQger vs. Kyoryuger: The Movie	Right/ToQ 1gou	Lead role	
2015	His Girlfriend	Keigo Minohara	Lead role	
2017	Teiichi: Battle of Supreme High	Kōmei Sakakibara		
2021	How We Work, How We Live	Himself	Documentary	
2022	Bubble	Hibiki (voice)		
2022	The Way of the Househusband: The Cinema	Masa		
2024	52-Hertz Whales	Ango Okada		
2026	Sakamoto Days	X (Slur)		
2026	Kingdom 5: The Clash of Souls	Meng Tian		
2027	All That Exists	Ryo Naito		

=== Dubbing ===
- Bumblebee (2019) - Guillermo "Memo" Gutierrez (Jorge Lendeborg Jr.)
- Onward (2020) - Ian Lightfoot (Tom Holland)

== Awards and nominations ==
Year	Award	Category	Work(s)	Result	Ref.
2019	43rd Elan d'or Awards	Newcomer of the Year	Himself	Won	
