= Riria Kojima =

Japanese actress

- 小島 梨里杏
- Born: Riria Baba; 18 December 1993 (age 32); Tokyo, Japan
- Other name: Riria (former stage name)
- Occupation: Actress
- Years active: 2001–present
- Agent: Toyota Office

Riria Baba (馬場 梨里杏, Baba Riria; born 18 December 1993), known professionally as Riria (梨里杏) and currently Riria Kojima (小島 梨里杏, Kojima Riria), is a Japanese actress. She is known for her role as Mio (ToQ 3gou) in the 2014 Super Sentai series Ressha Sentai ToQger.

== Career ==
She was affiliated with Kirin Pro and started her career in 2001. In 2007, she moved to LesPros Entertainment. In 2008, she changed her name to "Riria". In 2011, she won the Playboy Grand Prix prize at the third Gravure Japan awards. In 2014, she appeared in two tokusatsu series; Ressha Sentai ToQger and Zero: Black Blood. On June 17, 2015, she changed her name to "Riria Kojima". In December 2020, she left LesPros Entertainment. In 2021, she joined Toyota Office.

== Filmography ==
=== Films ===
- The Dark Maidens (2017), Akane Kominami
- The Moon Is Watching (2026), Tsukiko

=== Television ===
- Ressha Sentai ToQger (2014), Mio
- Ressha Sentai ToQger vs. Kamen Rider Gaim: Spring Break Combined Special (2014), Mio
- High School Chorus (2015), Fūka Takeuchi

=== Music videos ===
- Crystal Kay - Sakura (2016)
