= Space Sheriff =

The Space Sheriff Series (宇宙刑事シリーズ, Uchū Keiji Shirīzu) is a branch of Toei Company's Metal Hero Series. It includes:

1. Space Sheriff Gavan, 44 episodes 1982-3
2. Space Sheriff Sharivan, 51 episodes 1983-4
3. Space Sheriff Shaider, 49 episodes 1984-5
4. The Space Sheriff Spirits in 2006
5. Kaizoku Sentai Gokaiger vs. Space Sheriff Gavan: The Movie in January 2012
6. Space Sheriff Gavan: The Movie in October 2012
7. Kamen Rider × Super Sentai × Space Sheriff: Super Hero Taisen Z in April 2013
