= Space Sheriff Gavan =

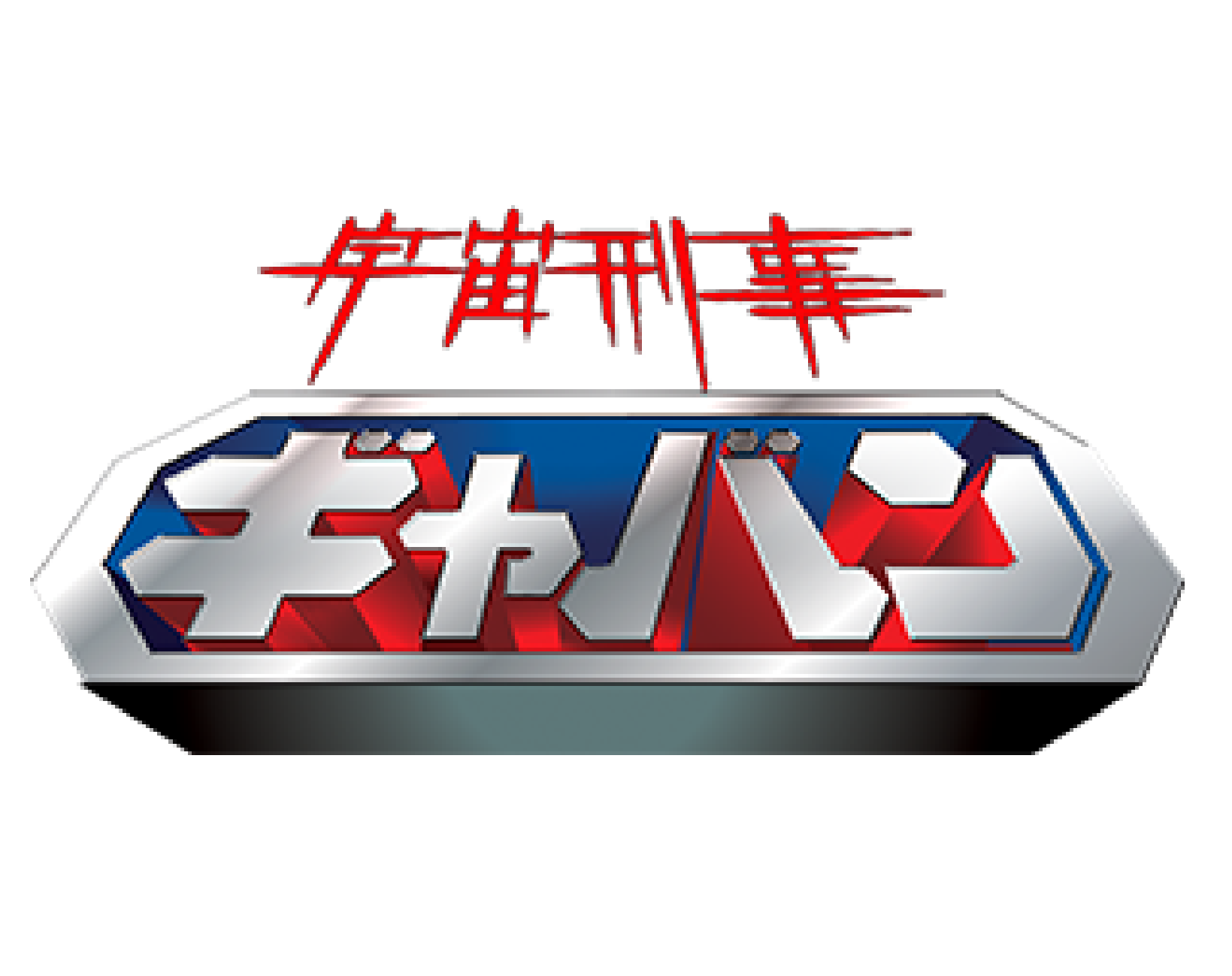
- Genre: Tokusatsu; Superhero fiction; Space western
- Created by: Saburō Yatsude
- Written by: Shozo Uehara
- Directed by: Yoshiaki Kobayashi
- Starring: Kenji Ohba; Wakiko Kano
- Narrated by: Issei Masamune
- Opening theme: Title song by Akira Kushida
- Ending theme: "Hoshizora no Message" by Akira Kushida
- Composer: Michiaki Watanabe
- Country of origin: Japan
- No. of episodes: 44

Production
- Producers: Yūyake Usui (TV Asahi); Susumu Yoshikawa; Itaru Orita (Toei)
- Running time: 25 minutes
- Production companies: TV Asahi; Toei Company; Asatsu

Original release
- Network: ANN (TV Asahi)
- Release: March 5, 1982 – February 25, 1983

Related
- Space Sheriff Sharivan

Space Sheriff Gavan (宇宙刑事ギャバン, Uchū Keiji Gyaban) is a Japanese Tokusatsu series produced by Toei Company that aired on TV Asahi from March 5, 1982, to February 25, 1983. The series launched the Metal Hero Series franchise and was the first installment in the Space Sheriff series.

For distribution purposes, Toei refers to this television series as Space Cop Gavan.

The hero's name is a tribute to French actor Jean Gabin.

== Plot ==
Earth is invaded by the criminal organization known as Makuu, led by Don Horror, who had first destroyed a space colony near Earth. Don Horror wants to dominate the whole universe, and the Earth represents an obstacle that he has to overcome by turning it into a domain for all evil. In response to Makuu's attack, Space Sheriff Gavan of the Galaxy Federal Police (銀河連邦警察, Ginga Renpō Keisatsu) is deployed to Earth to defend his mother's home world. Gavan is helped by Mimi, the daughter of Commander Qom, and is given information by Qom, assisted by Marin on his home planet. Gavan goes to Earth to defend it against Don Horror and his devilish schemes. He settles on Earth incognito as Retsu Ichijouji, taking a job at the Avalon Youth Club in Japan to track Makuu's forces down.

== Characters ==
=== Dolgiran ===
Based on the Superdimensional High-Speed Ship Dolgiran (超次元高速機ドルギラン, Chō Jigen Kōsokuki Dorugiran), it serves as headquarters for Gavan and Mimi as it circles around the Earth. It is composed of the giant weaponed Giran Saucer (ギラン円盤, Giran Enban) and the mechanical dragon Electronic Star-Beast Dol (電子星獣ドル, Denshi Seijū Doru) that Gavan rides on to destroy Makuu spacecraft. Dol's attacks include the Dol Fire (ドルファイヤー, Doru Faiyā) that breathes out fire from its mouth, the Dol Kick (ドルキック, Doru Kikku) that uses its front feet to clamp down pesky fighters, the Dol Crush (ドルクラッシュ, Doru Kurasshu) similar to Dol Kick but used by Gavan Type G, the Dol Laser (ドルレーザー, Doru Rēzā) that fires laser beams from Dol's eyes and its claws, and the Screw Attack (スクリューアタック, Sukuryū Atakku) that whips fighters attacking from behind with Dol's tail.

- Gavan (ギャバン, Gyaban)
  He is the son of Tamiko Ichijouji (一条寺 民子, Ichijōji Tamiko) and Voicer, having lived on Planet Bird (バード星, Bādo-sei) for most of his life until he is assigned the task to protect Earth against the invading Makuu Empire by donning the alias of Retsu Ichijouji (一条寺 烈, Ichijōji Retsu). When needed, Gavan yells "Electroplate" (蒸着, Jōchaku) so the Dolgiran can encase him in Granium (グラニウム, Guraniumu) particles that form into his silver-colored Combat Suit (コンバットスーツ, Konbatto Sūtsu) armor within 0.05 seconds. When no longer needing the armor, Gavan utters the "Vacuum Evaporation" command for his Combat Suit to be sent back to the Dolgiran. He is an accomplished athlete and has various weapons at his disposal. Though he relinquished his position as Earth's protector to his successors, marrying Mimi after Shaider's mission on Earth was completed, Gavan battled other enemies like the Madou, the Fuuma cult, and the Zangyack Empire. During the events of Space Sheriff Gavan: The Movie, Gavan selected Geki Jumonji to succeed him as the new Gavan. He is now promoted to commander status during the events of Kamen Rider × Super Sentai × Space Sheriff: Super Hero Taisen Z.
- Mimi (ミミー, Mimī)
  She is the only daughter of Commander Qom, Shelly's cousin and Gavan's girlfriend when she stowed away on the Dolgiran. She uses a pendant which is also a visual illusion device allows her to use Laser Vision (レーザービジョン, Rēzā Bijon), she can transform into a budgerigar to spy on the Makuu. She is in love with Gavan but would support him in any case. She leaves the Dolgiran to help her mother on Planet Bird, to return in later battles to continue helping Gavan. After the fall of Makuu, Mimi became a teacher on Planet Bird before she was married to Gavan.

==== Arsenal ====
- Laser Blade (レーザーブレード, Rēzā Burēdo)
  Gavan's mighty sword which is at first normal, with a steel blade. He later transforms it into a light blue blade, which is required to perform the Gavan Dynamic (ギャバン・ダイナミック, Gyaban Dainamikku) to destroy the monster by slicing it in two.
- Lazer Z Beam (レーザーＺビーム, Rēzā Zetto Bīmu)
  Gavan's projectile attack. Originally a laser beam emitted from his right hand.
- Barrier (バリアー, Bariā)
  A protective barrier that Gavan can emit to deflect any attack in front of him.
- Laser Scope (レーザースコープ, Rēzā Sukōpu)
  A radar device that Gavan uses to detect invisible monsters.
- Electro Sonar (エレクトロソナー, Erekutoro Sonā)
  A sonar device which enables Gavan to detect any movement and sound in the area.
- Cyberian (サイバリアン)
  Gavan's personal vehicle, which he uses to enter Makuu Space. When he calls for it, this red motorcycle with side car and flashing lights at the front comes from the Dolgiran to Gavan's current location. He occasionally uses it when fighting Makuu on Earth.
- Gavion (ギャビオン, Gyabion)
  Gavan's private tank, first used in episode 29. Like Dol, he stands up on the tank and commands it. This heavy vehicle is quite deadly thanks to all its lasers and cannons. Scooper is contained inside.
- Scooper (スクーパー, Sukūpā)
  Gavan's drill machine. He uses it to save Professor Kaminaga, to find hidden monsters, and to locate his father.

==== Allies ====
- Commander Qom (コム長官, Komu-chōkan)
  He is the commander of Galactic Union Police Force and the father of Mimi. He lives on Planet Bird, helping Gavan by providing information and training needed to beat the Makuu. He and Gavan can communicate through a giant screen on the Dolgiran.
- Marine (マリーン, Marīn)
  She is Commander Qom's assistant. She was ready to save Gavan's life when he was almost killed by the poison of the Dokuja Monster. She became Gavan's second assistant in Mimi's absence.
- Voicer (ボイサー, Boisā)
  Gavan's father and the former Space Sheriff of Earth. Voice was betrayed by his partner Hunter Killer and handed over to Makuu so he would be forced to build the Planetary Space Cannon, a weapon that can destroy a planet, but was tortured for the blueprints of the secret to the cannon, only to not actually know them. Though Voicer was saved from imprisonment by his son Gavan, he died soon after being brought to the Dolgiran with the secret blueprint for the cannon written on the palm of his hand only to be revealed when his body stops producing heat.
- Alan (アラン, Aran)
  The Space Sheriff assigned to Planet Beeze (ビーズ星, Bīzu-sei). He came to earth in search of a kidnapped princess from Planet Beeze.
- Den Iga (伊賀 電, Iga Den)
  He is a forest patrolman descended from the Iga ninja clan who was nearly killed by Buffalo Doubler. Den is sent to Planet Bird for his injuries, eventually returning to Earth to take over Gavan's position in protecting the planet as Space Sheriff Sharivan.
- Tsukiko Hoshino (星野 月子, Hoshino Tsukiko)
  She is Gavan's adopted sister and was brought up by Voicer when her parents were killed by Hunter Killer. She is a very sweet girl who assists Gavan in his missions.
- Kojiro Oyama (大山 小次郎, Ōyama Kojirō)
  His is a photographer whose obsession is UFOs; he created a machine that is able to detect them. He met Gavan and from then on, the two keep crossing each other's paths. He occasionally works at the Avalon Riding Club to replace Retsu. He also befriends Wakaba and Yoichi.
- Gosuke Fuji (藤 豪介, Fuji Gōsuke)
  The kind grandfather and owner of the Tokyo SuburbsAvalon Riding Club (アバロン乗馬クラブ, Abaron Jōba Kurabu) whose greatest wish is to get his young body back. Though he feels sympathy towards Gavan (who he knows as Retsu), he is often angered about his frequent disappearances.
- Wakaba (わかば) and Yoichi (陽一, Yōichi)
  Gosuke's grandchildren. They both live at the Avalon Riding Club and they sometimes happen to be in the middle of the Makuu schemes. They have developed a strong friendship with Retsu and Kojiro.
- Shigeru Touyama (当山 茂, Tōyama Shigeru)
  A youth who works for the Avalon Riding Club.

=== Space Crime Organization Makuu ===
The Space Crime Organization Makuu (宇宙犯罪組織マクー, Uchū Hanzai Soshiki Makū; literally "demon space"), led by Don Horror, commit criminal activities throughout the galaxies before targeting Earth for its resources. They are based in Makuu Castle (魔空城, Makūjō) which flies within Makuu Space (魔空空間, Makū Kūkan), a dimension created from evil energies and controlled by Don Horror and those descended from him. After Don Horror's death, much of Makuu Castle was destroyed yet ended up in the void of space where it was found by Brighton, Toya Okuma, during the events of Space Sheriff Gavan: The Movie where he revived the Makuu Syndicate to resurrect Don Horror. But with the ceremony stopped, Makuu Castle was completely destroyed as a result.

- Don Horror (ドン・ホラー, Don Horā)
  The monstrous leader of Makuu, an immobile six-armed idol-like being who aims to turn Earth, the obstacle that prevents his conquest of the universe, into a haven for evil by any means. During their final battle, after being severed from his body, Don Horror is killed by Gavan in their final duel. However, during the events of Space Sheriff Gavan: The Movie, Don Horror attempted to resurrect himself by using his agent Brighton to get him a vessel to house his spirit. But Don Horror's revival in the body of a young woman named Itsuki Kawai was stopped by Gavan Type-G.
- Horror Girl (ホラーガール, Horā Gāru)
  Don Horror's secretary, almost never speaking yet always laughing. She operates the axial shifter that allows a portal to Makuu Space to manifest.
- Hunter Killer (ハンターキラー, Hantā Kirā)
  He was Voicer's partner, but betrayed him to join Makuu as Don Horror's right-hand man. But after being replaced by San Dorva, Hunter Killer reappears to help Gavan to find his father just before dying to redeem himself.
- San Dorva (サン・ドルバ, San Doruba)
  The son of Don Horror, wearing crimson armor and holding a trident containing the brain of his mother, Witch Kiba, San Dorva joined Makuu alongside his mother Kiba and took Hunter Killer's place as Don Horror's right hand. He meets his end fighting Gavan in the final battle.
- Witch Kiba (魔女キバ, Majo Kiba)
  San Dorva's mother, her mind transferred into his scepter, the elderly hag was a wife of Don Horror despite him displaying nothing but contempt for her. She co-plots a devilish scheme to exterminate Gavan. She can materialize at any moment. She is killed by Gavan along with San Dorva.
- Beast-Alien Doubleman (獣星人ダブルマン, Jūseijin Daburuman)
  They are the generals of Makuu who can have a human form with the help of the Modification Room and are aided by the BEM Monsters.
- Crushers (クラッシャー, Kurasshā)
  The foot soldiers of Makuu in black leather and tights. They are unlimited in number and act only when in groups.

==== BEM creatures ====
BEM creatures (ベム怪獣, Bemu Kaijū) are animal-themed monsters sent by Don Horror to thwart Gavan.

- Clam Monster (シャコモンスター, Shako Monsutā)
  This monster appeared in episode 1. Its powers include fast crawling, invisibility, red lasers from the red back spots, mouth homing mines, and burrowing. A Doubleman summons this monster to assist in Makuu's operation to invade Earth. They begin attacking a space colony while the Clam Monster attacks from the inside until they destroy it. After Gavan saves a group of kids from being killed by a Doubleman who caught them playing around in one of their bases, he fights them and the Clam Monster. Don Horror has his minions activate the Makuu Space where the Clam Monster will be more powerful before Gavan is able to kill it with his Laser Z Beam.
- Gamara Monster (ガマラモンスター, Gamara Monsutā)
  This monster appeared in episode 2. Its powers include explosive mouth lasers, rolling into a ball, mouth mist capable of propulsion, invisibility, and size growth. Makuu has stolen some oil tanker ships threatening to use them to destroy Japan unless the government gives into their demands. After Gavan foils their attempt to get Mt. Fuji, they decide to use the oil tanker ships to destroy Japan. Gavan finds and infiltrates one of their bases where he goes into some boobytraps and running into Gamara Monster. After Gavan kills the Gamara Monster with the Dol Laser, he foils Makuu's plan by stopping the oil tankers from destroying Japan.
- Condor Monster (コンドルモンスター, Kondoru Monsutā)
  This monster appeared in episode 3. Its powers include a whip, eye beams, body part separation, an electric remote trident that can fire explosive electric blasts, and invisibility. Condor assists Makuu in their scheme to have Professor Black Star capture animals and children in nets to be used as test subjects for a teleportation device which will send them to different locations.
- Sasori Monster (サソリモンスター, Sasori Monsutā)
  This scorpion-themed monster appeared in episode 4. Its powers include a mouth stinger that dissolves victims, fast burrowing, a double sided triangular dagger, explosive eye energy bolts, telekinesis, and invisibility. Makuu uses the Sasori Monster with a Doubleman disguised as Professor Kaminaga in order for Makuu to get their hands on the Demon Helm.
- Dokuja Monster (ドクジャモンスター, Dokuja Monsutā)
  This cobra-themed monster appeared in episode 5. Its powers include toxic fangs, an extendable electric tentacle for the right hand, invisibility, summoning cobras, speed, and explosive mouth energy bolts. While Gavan makes his way into a Makuu base, Hunter Killer shoots Gavan with a bullet laced with poison from the Dokuja Monster.
- Oomadako Monster (オオマダコモンスター, Ōmadako Monsutā)
  This octopus-themed monster appeared in episode 6. Its powers include tentacle ropes with energy pulses, a flying white ball form, eye energy bolts, teleportation, and size growth. The Oomadako Monster is part of Makuu's plan to feed children mutagen spiked food to turn them into Doublemen that will serve Makuu.
- Samuraiari Monster (サムライアリモンスター, Samuraiari Monsutā)
  This slave-making ant-themed monster appeared in episode 7. Its powers include teleportation, size changing, explosive body energy bolts, summoning roses armed with venom spray, invisibility, and mouth venom spray. The Samuraiari Monster aids Makuu in their plans to steal gold even using one of Gavan's child friends to do it with the cost of the child's life should the child refuse.
- Kaenzaru Monster (カエンザルモンスター, Kaenzaru Monsutā)
  This mandrill-themed monster appeared in episode 8. Its powers include mouth flames, agility, and teleportation. The Kaenzaru Monster assists Makuu in their plan to create Space Magazine that will cause propaganda to turn people against Gavan.
- Nijichou Monster (ニジチョウモンスター, Nijichō Monsutā)
  This butterfly-themed monster appeared in episode 10. Its powers include teleportation, gliding, blinding mouth powder spray, size growth, and eye lasers. The Nijichou Monster aids Makuu's plan in turning athletes into mindless soldiers to make an army strong enough to defeat Gavan.
- Armadillo Monster (アルマジロモンスター, Arumajiro Monsutā)
  This monster appeared in episode 11. Its powers include a high resistance to heat, explosive flashes from the eye, teleportation, and size growth. The Armadillo Monster accompanies Makuu to kill Gavan after they used Gavan's search for his father to lure him into a trap.
- Goat Monster (ゴートモンスター, Gōto Monsutā)
  This monster appeared in episode 12. Its powers include teleportation, explosive mouth foam, and agility. Makuu has discovered a boy when he overhears their plan, threatening to have the Goat Monster kill him unless he keeps his mouth shut.
- Sai Monster (サイモンスター, Sai Monsutā)
  This rhinoceros-themed monster appeared in episode 13. Its only known power is a set of horns on the head. The Sai Monster is merged with a Doubleman to create Sai Doubler.

==== Double monsters ====
Double Monsters (ダブルモンスター, Daburu Monsutā) are a second series of monsters created by Don Horror, combining the traits of Doublemen and BEM Monsters. During a fight with Gavan, a Double Monster retreats into the Makuu Space where it becomes three times more powerful in an attempt to get the upper hand against Gavan.

- Sai Doubler (サイダブラー, Sai Daburā)
  This rhinoceros-themed monster appeared in episodes 13 and 14. Its powers include a set of horns on the head, strength, a sword, a shield, teleportation, and a human disguise. The Sai Doubler aids in Makuu's plan to kill Gavan but is killed by Gavan using Gavan Dynamic.
- Shamo Doubler (シャモダブラー, Shamo Daburā)
  This gamecock-themed monster appeared in episode 15. Its powers include teleportation, agility, summoning poles, summoning defeated BEM Monsters, and a sword. The Shamo Doubler aids in Makuu's plan to sacrifice Gavan in order to celebrate the anniversary of their creation of Makuu city.
- Kama Doubler (カマダブラー, Kama Daburā)
  This mantis-themed monster appeared in episode 16. Its powers include a human disguise, a chained scythe that can be controlled mentally, fake deaths, telekinesis, and a sword. The Kama Doubler assists Makuu in their plans to capture an alien boy in order to get their hands on a device.
- Hyou Doubler (ヒョウダブラー, Hyō Daburā)
  This leopard-themed monster appears in episode 17. Its powers include a human disguise, high jumping, and a double sided bear trap staff. When Mimi falls in love with a young police officer, Makuu along with the Hyou Doubler capture the officer so Gavan must race to save him or he will be blown to smithereens.
- Aogame Doubler (アオガメダブラー, Aogame Daburā)
  This turtle-themed monster appeared in episode 18. Its powers include a human disguise, swimming, a halberd that emits electric surges, launch-able shell plates, an explosive boomerang, and a hypnotic hermit crab shell. The Aogame Doubler aids in Makuu's scheme to steal the time machine so they can steal riches from a palace.
- Kyoryu Doubler (キョウリュウダブラー, Kyōryū Daburā)
  This dinosaur-themed monster appeared in episode 19. Its powers include a human disguise, a double sided blade, three explosive spears on the back, a pistol, high jumping, and a sword. The Kyoryu Doubler is responsible for damaging Gavan's power source for his armor so Gavan has to get it repaired before the Makuu and the Kyoryu Doubler kill him.
- Kera Doubler (ケラダブラー, Kera Daburā)
  This mole cricket-themed monster appeared in episode 20. Its powers include a human disguise, a spiked left arm, teleportation by spinning, three grenade launchers in the torso, a cannon in the left shoulder, and a sword. The Kera Doubler is part of Makuu's plan to obtain the poisonous stone for their plans.
- Mitsubachi Doubler (ミツバチダブラー, Mitsubachi Daburā)
  This honeybee-themed monster appeared in episode 21. Its powers include a human disguise, pain negating venom and explosive tracking needles from the left hand stinger called the Bee Sting, a whip, and size growth. The Mitsubachi Doubler disguises herself as a doctor to brainwash people into mindless soldiers to serve Makuu.
- Kurage Doubler (クラゲダブラー, Kurage Daburā)
  This jellyfish-themed monster appeared in episode 22. Its powers include a human disguise, a double sided club ended trident capable of levitation, high jumping, and a sword. The Kurage Doubler and his Makuu allies assist Thief X to commit robberies and kill Gavan.
- Kumo Doubler (クモダブラー, Kumo Daburā)
  This spider-themed monster appeared in episode 23. Its powers include a human disguise, spiders that emit explosive eye flashes, an electric cane, hand webs, teleportation, and a sword. He disguises himself as a man to kidnap women at night bringing them to Makuu to use in their plans.
- Saber Doubler (サーベルダブラー, Sāberu Daburā)
  This Smilodon-themed monster appeared in episode 24. Its powers include high jumping, a pair of claws on the left wrist, illusions, grenades, a sword, and size growth. When Mimi has a nightmare of Gavan being killed by the Saber Doubler, he comes out of Mimi's dream to kill Gavan.
- Goshiki Doubler (ゴシキダブラー, Goshiki Daburā)
  This plant-themed monster appeared in episode 25. Its powers include a human disguise, hallucinating white mist from the right shoulder, teleportation, high jumping, a mentally controlled spear that can emit electric streams on the ground, levitation, size growth, and left wrist grenades. The Goshiki Doubler disguises herself as a woman who gives girls perfume that turns girls into monsters so Makuu will have an army of monsters.
- Gas Doubler (ガスダブラー, Gasu Daburā)
  This chameleon-themed monster appeared in episode 26. Its powers include a human disguise, summoning white hallucination gas, a pincer claw staff that can emit explosions, teleportation, and a pair of swords. The Gas Doubler poses as the leader of a terrorist group called Dream Bird to attack people.
- Jaaku Doubler (ジャアクダブラー, Jaaku Daburā)
  This monster appeared in episode 27. Its powers include a human disguise, telekinesis, mind control, a serpent staff, summoning snakes that can turn into explosive beads, high jumping, and a sword. The Jaaku Doubler disguises himself as a faculty member to turn school students as well as teachers evil.
- Hakkotsu Doubler (ハッコツダブラー, Hakkotsu Daburā)
  This bone-themed monster appeared in episode 28. Its powers include illusions, a bone staff, telekinetic bone bombs, high jumping, teleportation, levitation, and a sword. The Hakkotsu Doubler aids a female assassin named Monica to kill Gavan.
- Magic Doubler (マジックダブラー, Majikku Daburā)
  This horned owl-themed monster appeared in episode 29. Its powers include mentally controlling doves, razor cards, telepathic explosions, teleportation, a telekinetic cloak, red electric shocks from the palms that can be used as surges on the ground, a flying circular saw, transforming into a rock capable of turning invisible, and a pair of swords. The Magic Doubler disguises himself as a magician in a Makuu scheme to steal all money and jewelry using a magician trick called a warp trick.
- Keibi Doubler (ケイビダブラー, Keibi Daburā)
  This monster appeared in episode 30. Its powers include high jumping, morphing into a levitating ball, bouncing head bombs, regeneration, a pair of magnetic spheres, a kanabo, and a sword. The Keiki Doubler is created to aid Don Horror's son Son Dorva in killing Gavan.
- Saimin Doubler (サイミンダブラー, Saimin Daburā)
  This fly-themed monster appeared in episode 31. Its powers include a human disguise with palm lasers, turning humans into puppets by hypnosis, a staff that can fire lasers, teleportation, summoning a rock bomb, invisibility, and a sword. The Saimin Doubler aids Makuu to go after a princess from Planet Beeze which was about to become a Makuu colony.
- Totsugeki Doubler (トツゲキダブラー, Totsugeki Daburā)
  This sawshark-themed monster appeared in episode 32. Its powers include teleportation, a nasal horn, an electric lance, telekinesis, and a sword. The Totsugeki Doubler is created to assist Witch Kiba and Son Dorva to kill Gavan.
- Kaibutsu Doubler (カイブツダブラー, Kaibutsu Daburā)
  This monster appeared in episode 33. Its powers include rapid size growth, flight in the larval state, invisibility, an electric claw staff that emits electric surges, teleportation, high jumping, and a sword. The Kaibutsu Doubler aids in Makuu's scheme to create special Double Monsters that will turn into giants.
- Doctor Doubler (ドクターダブラー, Dokutā Daburā)
  This monster appeared in episode 34. Its powers include a human disguise, teleportation, launchable arm spears, a zanbato, and a sword. The Doctor Doubler is created as part of Makuu's plan to control peoples memories using a terrible device.
- Guts Doubler (ガッツダブラー, Gattsu Daburā)
  This monster appeared in episode 35. Its powers include am electric horned club that emits spiral electric surges, high jumping, a round shield, and a sword. The Guts Doubler is created to aid Witch Kiba and Son Dorva in capturing Marin and Tsuchiko so that Gavan will be at their mercy.
- Urami Doubler (ウラミダブラー, Urami Daburā)
  This monster appeared in episode 36. Its powers include high jumping, an electric staff, freezing stare, teleportation, a human disguise, voodoo pictures, illusions, and a sword. The Urami Doubler is used in a Makuu plot to kill Gavan by creating a movie about him. What is bad about this is that if Gavan in the movie suffers damage so does the real Gavan.
- Anahori Doubler (アナホリダブラー, Anahori Dabuā)
  This monster appeared in episode 37. Its powers include a human disguise, teleportation, burrowing, a pair of bat bombs, a club, a wine-like whip, an electric drill that can be worn on the right hand and turn into a sword, and illusions. The Anahori Doubler and his Makuu allies take control of a church where they plan to steal its treasure.
- Gang Doubler (ギャングダブラー, Gyangu Daburā)
  This monster appeared in episode 38. Its powers include telepathic explosions, summoning explosive magnets, high jumping, teleportation, and a sword. Makuu plans to get their hands on a sword with hidden powers. Unfortunately for them, Gavan fights them and steals the sword. Son Dorva has Kiba take a bus full of children hostage to trade for the sword.
- Nottori Doubler (ノットリダブラー, Nottori Daburā)
  This monster appeared in episode 39. Its powers include a human disguise, a sniper rifle-like heat gun, high jumping, mentally controlling an electric tomahawk and a gatling gun, invisibility, and a sword. He and his Makuu allies take control of a poor family's home as a hideout where they plan to snipe Gavan.
- Yokai Doubler (ヨウカイダブラー, Yōkai Daburā)
  This monster appeared in episode 40. Its powers include a human disguise, telekinesis, a double clawed staff that can emit electric surges, telepathic explosions, teleportation, high jumping, right palm webs, summoning skulls, invisibility, and a sword. The Yokai Doubler aids Makuu in their scheme to mine minerals from a mountain to make atomic bombs.
- Jigoku Doubler (ジゴクダブラー, Jigoku Daburā)
  This monster appeared in episode 41. Its powers include a spear that emits explosions on contact, dividing into four ninjas, teleportation, emitting electric surges, a ball form, high jumping, and an electric sword. The Jigoku Doubler and Makuu trap Gavan in the Makuu Space where he is forced to run a marathon of death. To make matters worse a magic hourglass threaten to seal Gavan forever in Makuu Space.
- Buffalo Doubler (バッファローダブラー, Baffarō Daburā)
  This monster appeared in episode 42. Its powers include a pair of forehead mandibles that emit electric surges, summoning giant buffalo horns, telepathic explosions, teleportation, a ball form, and a sword. The Buffalo Doubler aids Makuu in their plan to terrorize forests and kill Gavan.
- Rhino Doubler (ライノダブラー, Raino Daburā)
  This monster is a remake of the Sai Doubler, who later appears in Tokumei Sentai Go-Busters 31st and 32nd episodes, which serve as a team-up with Gavan Type-G.
- Lizard Doubler (リザードダブラー, Rizādo Daburā)
  This monster was used by the revived Makuu during the events of Space Sheriff Gavan: The Movie and was destroyed by Gavan. Its powers include skin capable of hacking, activating the axis shift device mentally, a sword, a shield, a missile launcher that can be attached to the right arm called the Lizard Missile, and manipulating environments.

== Films ==
=== Gokaiger vs. Gavan ===
Kaizoku Sentai Gokaiger vs. Space Sheriff Gavan: The Movie (海賊戦隊ゴーカイジャーVS宇宙刑事ギャバンTHE MOVIE, Kaizoku Sentai Gōkaijā Tai Uchū Keiji Gyaban Za Mūbī) is a film featuring the clash of Gavan and the space pirates Kaizoku Sentai Gokaiger and especially their captain Marvelous, who was connected to Gavan since his childhood. Released on January 21, 2012, the film commemorates the 30th anniversary of Gavan and is part of the 35th anniversary of the Super Sentai Series. Kenji Ohba not only portrays Retsu Ichijouji, but also reprises his roles from Battle Fever J and Denshi Sentai Denziman. Even a copy of Gavan's combat suit appears named Gavan Bootleg.

=== Gavan the Movie ===
Space Sheriff Gavan: The Movie (宇宙刑事ギャバン THE MOVIE) is a 2012 Japanese tokusatsu film to commemorate the 30th Anniversary of the Metal Hero Series. The movie features Retsu training his replacement Geki Jumonji as the youth confronts the revived Space Mafia Makuu.

=== Super Hero Taisen Z ===
Kamen Rider × Super Sentai × Space Sheriff: Super Hero Taisen Z (仮面ライダー×スーパー戦隊×宇宙刑事 スーパーヒーロー大戦Z, Kamen Raidā × Sūpā Sentai × Uchū Keiji: Supā Hīrō Taisen Zetto) is the 2013 film featuring the first crossover between characters of Toei's three main Tokusatsu franchises, Kamen Rider, Super Sentai, and the Space Sheriff Series representing the Metal Heroes series as a whole. The protagonists of Space Sheriff Gavan: The Movie, Tokumei Sentai Go-Busters, and Kaizoku Sentai Gokaiger are featured, but the casts of Kamen Rider Wizard, Zyuden Sentai Kyoryuger, and Kamen Rider Fourze also participate in the film. The Space Ironmen Kyodain from Kamen Rider Fourze the Movie: Space, Here We Come! also make an appearance. The teaser for the film was shown after Kamen Rider × Kamen Rider Wizard & Fourze: Movie War Ultimatum.

== Cast ==
- Gavan/Retsu Ichijouji
  Kenji Ohba
- Mimi
  Wakiko Kanou
- Qom
  Toshiaki Nishizawa
- Marine
  Kyoko Nashiro
- Voicer
  Sonny Chiba
- Kojiro Oyama
  Masayuki Suzuki
- Tamiko Ichijouji
  Tamie Kubata
- Tsukiko Hoshino
  Aiko Tachibana
- Makuu
  Morita Sakamoto
- Gosuke Fuji
  Jun Tatara
- Yoichi Fuji
  Susumu Fujiwara
- Wakaba Fuji
  Sanae Nakajima
- Shigeru Toyama
  Shinichi Kase
- Hunter Killer
  Michiro Iida
- San Dorva
  Ken Nishida
- Kiba
  Noboru Mitani
- Double Girls
  Mariko Azuma, Rie Hirase, Hiromi Yamaguchi

=== Voice cast ===
- Don Horror
  Shouzou Iizuka (1-10)
  Takeshi Watabe (11-44)
- Horror Girl
  Kotoe Taichi
- Narrator
  Issei Masamune

=== Guest cast ===
- Doubleman (human form)
  Satoshi Kurihara (2)
- Doubleman (human form)
  Masashi Ishibashi (3)
- Professor Kaminaga
  Hiroshi Unayama (4)
- Doubleman (human form)
  Shun Ueda (6)
- Samuraiari Monster (human form)
  Susumu Kurobe (7)
- Editor-in-Chief Arashiyama (Double Man's human form)
  Rikiya Iwaki (8)
- Tetsuya Sugimoto/Tetsu Tsukahara
  Dai Nagaswa (9)
- Nanae Tsukahara
  Akiko Ishii (9)
- Toshi Kojima
  Kazuo Arai (10)
- Doctor Hoshino
  Eiji Karasawa (11)
- Hayashima
  Masaharu Saito (12)
- Goh Daijoji/Hyou Doubler
  Shinji Todo (17)
- Honey Manda/Mitsubachi Doubler
  Machiko Soga (21)
- Monica (younger)
  Hitomi Yoshioka (28)
- Paul
  Hirohisa Nakata (29)
- Alan
  Hiroshi Miyauchi (30-31)
- Double Monster
  Hideyo Amamoto (37)
- Policeman
  Touta Tarumi (38)
- Sharivan/Den Iga
  Hiroshi Watari (42, 44)

=== Stunt cast ===
- Gavan
  Jun Murakami
  Hitoshi Yamaguchi
- Horror Girl
  Miyuki Nagato

== Song ==
Opening theme

- "Space Sheriff Gavan" (宇宙刑事ギャバン, Uchū Keiji Gyaban)
  - Lyrics
    Keisuke Yamakawa (山川 啓介, Yamakawa Keisuke)
  - Composition
    Michiaki Watanabe (渡辺 宙明, Watanabe Michiaki)
  - Arrangement
    Kōji Makaino (馬飼野 康二, Makaino Kōji)
  - Artist
    Akira Kushida

Ending theme

- "Hoshizora no Message" (星空のメッセージ, Hoshizora no Messēji; "The Starry Sky's Message")
  - Lyrics
    Keisuke Yamakawa
  - Composition
    Michiaki Watanabe
  - Arrangement
    Kōji Makaino
  - Artist
    Akira Kushida

== International broadcast, home video and streaming ==
- In its home country of Japan, the series has seen several home video releases over the years. It was first released on VHS tapes between October 1986 through September 1989 and spread across 14 volumes throughout that time period. All 44 episodes were released in this format, but they did not match the broadcast order, as it was originally planned to be a selection of the best episodes. Then between June 21, 1996, and April 21, 1997, the series was released on Laserdisc and spread throughout 6 volumes, with each volume being a 2-disc set with 8 episodes, with the last volume only being 1 disc with 4 episodes. After that, it got a DVD release with volumes 1 and 2 released on October 21, 2002, with volumes 3 and 4 released the next month, on November 21, of that year. Each volume holds 2 discs with 11 episodes. Then between September 21 and November 21, 2012, the series was re-released on DVD and spread throughout 8 volumes. Each volume is a 1-disc set with 6 episodes on odd-numbered volumes and 5 episodes on even-numbered volumes. In honor of its 30th anniversary of the Metal Hero series and the Space Sheriff series that includes it, "Space Sheriff Gavan Memorial: 30th Year Reunion" was released. After that, between January 11 and March 8, 2017, they released two volumes on Blu-Ray, with each volume set holding 4 discs and contains 22 episodes.
- The series was aired in France under the title X-OR on Récré A2 on October 26, 1983, on Antenne 2 (now France 2). Its popularity led to the airings of subsequent Metal Hero shows such as its sequels Space Sheriff Sharivan and Jikuu Senshi Spielban. It then aired on subsequent networks such as then on TMC from January 2001, AB1, Mangas from August 2001 and Ciné FX in 2008.
- In the Philippines, it was aired as Sky Ranger Gavin on IBC 13/VTV from 1997 to 1998 and was the 2nd Metal Hero shown on that station from 1999 to 2000, Space Sheriff Shaider whose successor to Gavin, was aired in that country before the release of Sky Ranger Gavin.
- Indonesia and Malaysia's screening of Gavan (translated as Gaban) on local TV has gained itself a cult following, and the word Gaban itself has become a meme. It is used after adjectives to give an image of bravery e.g. "segede Gaban" ("as big as Gaban", epically big) or "Gaban Betul" ("truly Gaban", really brave) or "tahap Gaban" stand for the superior level of achievement.
- In Thailand, the series was aired on TV and released on Home Video (VCD), with Thai dubbing included.
- In Hong Kong, the series aired on TVB Jade with a Cantonese Chinese dub.
- In Brazil, where the series was broadcast on Rede Globo, premiering on March 4, 1991, on the Sessão Aventura block, the series was proven popular, despite only showing the first 20 episodes. Later on, the series was carried over to the now defunct Xou da Xuxa block, which is where all 44 episodes were shown by a miracle. It was also subsequently broadcast on TV Gazeta in the same year, on the program Gazetinha. Like other Metal Hero programs, this one is just as popular.
- The character appeared in Power Rangers Beast Morphers by way of footage from Tokumei Sentai Go-Busters, but with a new backstory under the name Captain Chaku.
- The series was licensed by Discotek Media for an American Blu-ray release, its first English-subtitled release. It was released in October 2022.
