= Taiyo Sentai Sun Vulcan =

Television series

- Title Screen
- Genre: Tokusatsu; Superhero fiction Science fiction
- Created by: Toei Company
- Developed by: Shozo Uehara
- Directed by: Koichi Takemoto; Yoshiaki Kobayashi; Takafumi Hattori; Shohei Tojo; Kimio Hirayama; Akira Kashima; Minoru Yamada
- Starring: Ryūsuke Kawasaki; Kinya Sugi; Asao Kobayashi; Shin Kishida; Yumi Nemoto; Takayuki Godai; Machiko Soga; Yukie Kagawa
- Narrated by: Tōru Ōhira
- Opening theme: "Taiyo Sentai Sun Vulcan" by Akira Kushida & Koorogi '73
- Composer: Michiaki Watanabe
- Country of origin: Japan
- No. of episodes: 50 (list of episodes)

Production
- Producers: Takeyuki Suzuki; Yūyake Usui; Susumu Yoshikawa
- Running time: 30 minutes
- Production companies: TV Asahi; Toei Company; Toei Advertising

Original release
- Network: ANN (TV Asahi)
- Release: February 7, 1981 – January 30, 1982

Related
- Denshi Sentai Denjiman; Dai Sentai Goggle-V

Taiyo Sentai Sun Vulcan (太陽(たい よう)戦隊サンバルカン, Taiyō Sentai San Barukan; Solar Squadron Sun Vulcan) is a Japanese television tokusatsu series broadcast by TV Asahi. The series is the fifth installment of Super Sentai. Directed by Koichi Takemoto, Yoshiaki Kobayashi, Takafumi Hattori, Shohei Tojo, Kimio Hirayama, Akira Kashima and Minoru Yamada, it stars Ryūsuke Kawasaki, Kinya Sugi, Asao Kobayashi, Shin Kishida, Yumi Nemoto, Takayuki Godai, Machiko Soga and Yukie Kagawa. It aired from February 7, 1981 to January 30, 1982, replacing Denshi Sentai Denjiman and was replaced by Dai Sentai Goggle-V. The program first Super Sentai series to serve as a direct sequel to its previous series (Denshi Sentai Denjiman). It is also the first and only series in the franchise to have an all-male Super Sentai team, as well as the first to have fewer than five members in the core team. Its international English title as listed by Toei Company is Sunvulcan.

== Plot ==
The threat of the Machine Empire Black Magma causes the United Nations to establish the Taiyo Sentai at a summit. From the UN's Guardians of World Peace's (GWP) air force, navy, and army, Commander Arashiyama assembles three specialists to become Sun Vulcan. When Black Magma learns of this, he attacks the GWP's base, but Sun Vulcan debuts in time to save it. Führer Hell Saturn prays to the Black Solar God and is rewarded with a revived Queen Hedrian, now a cyborg with a mechanical heart and a metallic afro. Black Magma's multiple plots, even with Hedrian's aid, fails. Following the death of 01, Amazon Killer, (a Vader) arrives from space, destroying the Sun Vulcan Base. A new Vulcan Base is then built.

The original Vul Eagle, Ryusuke Owashi, is replaced by a friend and master of the sword, Takayuki Hiba (who first appeared in episode 23).

== Characters ==
=== Guardians of World Peace ===
The Japanese branch of the GWP is the Sun Vulcan team's secret headquarters, with the Snack Safari (スナックサファリ, Sunakku Safari) restaurant and a safari park acting as a front.

==== Sun Vulcan ====
The eponymous Sun Vulcan is the GWP's Taiyo Sentai, and the first and only Super Sentai team to be all-male. Each member identifies himself before the group says "Shine! Taiyo Sentai Sun Vulcan!" (輝け!太陽戦隊サンバルカン!, Kagayake! Taiyō Sentai San Barukan!). Ryusuke, Kinya, and Asao's last names, as well as Takayuki's first name, include the Japanese names of their totem animals.

- Vul Eagle (バルイーグル, Baru Īguru): The red-colored warrior and leader of the Sun Vulcan team whose moniker was utilized by its original user and his successor.
  - Ryusuke Owashi (大鷲 龍介, Ōwashi Ryūsuke; 1–23): A GWP air force officer whose skills made him the top pilot in the organization. He left to pursue space shuttle research for NASA in the United States.
  - Takayuki Hiba (飛羽 高之, Hiba Takayuki; 23–50): A colleague of Ryusuke and master of kendo. He took over for Ryusuke after the latter left for NASA shuttle research. Along with his fellow red warriors from Himitsu Sentai Gorenger to Mirai Sentai Timeranger, Takayuki appeared in Hyakujuu Sentai Gaoranger vs. Super Sentai. He also appeared in the final episode of Kaizoku Sentai Gokaiger, receiving his powers back in the form of the Vul Eagle Key as the Gokaigers left Earth.
- Kinya Samejima/Vul Shark (鮫島 欣也/バルシャーク, Samejima Kin'ya/Baru Shāku): The blue-colored warrior of the Sun Vulcan team. A GWP naval officer who is also an oceanographer, he spent most of his childhood in Africa. Having lost his parents and younger brother during an altercation, Kinya's hatred for any form of violence motivated him to volunteer for the Sun Vulcan project.
- Asao Hyou/Vul Panther (豹 朝夫/バルパンサー, Hyō Asao/Baru Pansā): The yellow-colored warrior of the Sun Vulcan team. A GWP army officer who can climb any surface. Despite his courage in battle, Asao has an unusual fear of dogs, especially CC.

==== Allies ====
- Daizaburo Arashiyama (嵐山 大三郎, Arashiyama Daizaburō): The commander of the GWP, who is also an expert at robotics. He designed the team's mecha. He is also the owner of the Snack Safari restaurant and he cares for the animals in the zoo that the SunVulcan base is built on.
- Misa Arashiyama (嵐山 美佐, Arashiyama Misa): The Commander's daughter, serving as his secretary. In Episode 29, she transforms into Belle Swordswoman White Rose Mask (美剣士白バラ仮面, Bikenshi Shiro Bara Kamen) (likely through the quick-change talent that she shares with many Super Sentai heroines) to aid the Sun Vulcans in their battle against Red Rose Mask (Rose Monger).
- CC (シーシー, Shīshī): An intelligent dog cared by the Arashiyamas. He is trained by Misa to speak fluent Japanese.

=== Machine Empire Black Magma ===
Machine Empire Black Magma (機械帝国ブラックマグマ, Kikai Teikoku Burakku Maguma) is an organization based at the Iron Claw Castle at the North Pole that worships the Black Solar God. Intending to have its Mechahumans rule the world, Black Magma's technology is advanced enough to cause natural disasters and cause global incidents. However, Black Magma targets Japan in order to obtain the cache of geothermal energy there needed to power their arsenal.

- The Omnipotent God (全能の神, Zennō no Kami): The true leader of Black Magma, known as the Black Solar God. He is hinted to have connections to the Incan and Mayan civilizations. The Omnipotent God normally communicates to Hell Saturn via an idol.
- Führer Hell Saturn (ヘルサターン総統, Heru Satān Sōtō): Though he rules over Black Magma, he is actually a servant of the Omnipotent God.
- Zero Girls (ゼロガールズ, Zero Gāruzu): A quartet of female spies numbered 01-04. 01 wears red and wields throwing knives, 02 wears black and wields cards, 03 wears green and dual wields a pair of swords, and 04 wears purple and wields yo-yos. While Zero Girl 01 died, the remaining three survive until they die piloting King Magma during the final battle.
  - Zero Girl 01 (ゼロガール01, Zero Gāru 01): A red-suited member of the Zero Girls who functions as the active field commander and wields throwing knives. She is killed as the result of a cave-in.
- Dark Q (ダークQ, Dāku Kyū): A series of spy mechanoids used by Hell Saturn for infiltration and assassinations, stronger than normal humans. Constructed with care, the mechanoids are placed in a torturous combat testing with the survivors branded as Dark Q and must succeed in their missions or be obliterated for failure. About 96 models were made before the 97th was created as the finalized model for Black Magma to use in its invasion. The 97th posed as Kagayama, becoming Arashiyama's aide to uncover info on Sun Vulcan Robo before she is exposed and ejected from the base before she self-destructs. The 97th model, wielding claws, aided in stealing a dangerous bacteria in Black Magma's scheme to cause conflict. A 98th model was built to kill various important figures considered national treasures in Japan, only to be stopped in her tracks. The 99th model, equipped with a detachable arm that doubles as flame thrower poses as an officer to obtain the contents of a vault. But her failure to secure it results in her destruction with the 100th model utilized to complete Black Magma's plan to build a fortress underground before she is destroyed by the Sun Vulcan group. Eventually, the Dark Q series is discontinued.
- Queen Hedrian (ヘドリアン女王, Hedorian Joō): Originally the leader of the Vader Clan, she was found frozen at the North Pole by the Omnipotent God and revived as a cyborg with a mechanical heart. As a result, instead of avenging her Vader Clansmen, Hedrian is forced to serve Black Magma as the Omnipotent God's high priestess with Hell Saturn able to shut down her mechanical heart should she betray them. After Hell Saturn is seemingly destroyed, Hedrian took over the Black Magma leadership until the ghost of her predecessor appeared just when she kidnapped Misa through her sorcery and induced cardiac arrest with the shutdown of her heart. She is portrayed by Machiko Soga.
- Amazon Killer (アマゾンキラー, Amazon Kirā): A former Vader Clan field officer who came from space, loyal only to Queen Hedrian. Taking Zero Girl 01's place as the field commander, Amazon Killer succeeded in destroying the Sun Vulcan's Head Base and did her job very actively in both combat and stealth. After Queen Hedrian's death, Amazon Killer was forced to fight the Sun Vulcan, who came to rescue Daizaburou and Misa. She had them on the ropes, but surviving their combination attack, Amazon Killer took her own life out of a refusal of serve Black Magma.
- Inazuma Gingar (イナズマギンガー, Inazuma Gingā): A space pirate who is known as the "Galactic Invincible Electric Man" (銀河無敵の電気男, Ginga Muteki no Denki Otoko) who is sought by the Galactic Police. Once Amazon Killer's partner, Inazuma is manipulated into challenging Hell Saturn by her and Queen Hedrian. Inazuma seems to defeat Hell Saturn in the episode, allowing Queen Hedrian to declare herself ruler of Black Magma. However, Hell Saturn returns as a ghost and get his revenge by tossing Inazuma into the Monger-Maker transforming him into Lightning Monger (イナズマモンガー, Inazuma Mongā) who meets his end against the Sun Vulcan team.
- Machinemen (マシンマン, Mashinman): The android foot soldiers in black with the Kabuki-like red insignia of Black Magma on their faces. They are not to be confused with Seiun Kamen Machineman.

==== Monger Army ====
The Monger Army (モンガー軍, Mongā-gun), also known as the Machine Lifeforms (機械生命体, Kikai seimei-tai), are bio-machines created through a combination of a special super-alloy mined from the Japanese volcanoes and an environment's elements in the Monger Maker machine in Iron Claw Castle that are used by Black Magma. To make a Monger grow, the "Expansion Program" will be activated.

- Grub Monger (ジムシモンガー, Jimushi Mongā): A beetle larve-themed Monger created by Hell Satan.
- Coela Monger (シーラモンガー, Shīra Mongā): A coelacanth-themed Monger.
- Naumann Monger (ナウマンモンガー, Nauman Mongā): A Naumann's elephant-themed Monger.
- Bird Monger (トリモンガー, Tori Mongā): A Pteranodon-themed Monger.
- Devil Monger (マジンモンガー, Majin Mongā): A devil-themed Monger.
- Machine Monger (キカイモンガー, Kikai Mongā): A Monger created from a combination of Queen Hedrian's magic and Führer Hell Satan's Monger-Maker.
- Baseball Monger (ヤキュウモンガー, Yakyū Mongā): A baseball umpire-themed Monger.
- Vision Monger (ムゲンモンガー, Mugen Mongā): An illusion-casting Monger.
- Scorpion Monger (サソリモンガー, Sasori Mongā): A two-faced scorpion-themed Monger.
- Spider Monger (クモモンガー, Kumo Mongā): A spider-themed Monger.
- Fern Monger (シダモンガー, Shita Mongā): A fern-themed Monger.
- Diamond Monger (ダイヤモンガー, Daiya Mongā): A diamond-themed Monger.
- Iron Monger (アイアンモンガー, Aian Mongā): An iron ore/volcano-themed Monger created from an iron ball of super-alloy harvested from a volcano that came to life.
- Armadillo Monger (アルマジロモンガー, Arumadiro Mongā): An armadillo-themed Monger.
- Time Monger (タイムモンガー, Taimu Mongā): A time-controlling unicorn/electric clock-themed Monger created by Queen Hedrian.
- Vaulting Box Monger (トビバコモンガー, Tobibako Mongā): A vaulting box-themed Monger.
- Gas Monger (ガスモンガー, Gasu Mongā): A gas mask-wearing gas-themed Monger.
- Camera Monger (カメラモンガー, Kamera Mongā): A camera-themed Monger.
- Toad Monger (ガマモンガー, Gama Mongā): A toad-themed Monger.
- Wrestler Monger (レスラーモンガー, Resurā Mongā): A wrestler-themed Monger.
- Sea Anemone Monger (イソギンモンガー, Isogane Mongā): A sea anemone-themed Monger.
- Horseshoe Crab Monger (カブトガニモンガー, Kabutogani Mongā): A horseshoe crab-themed Monger.
- Giant Octopus Monger (オオダコモンガー, Ōtako Mongā): An giant octopus-themed Monger.
- Water Bug Monger (タガメモンガー, Tagame Mongā): A water bug-themed Monger.
- Hanabi Monger (ハナビモンガー, Hanabi Mongā): A fireworks-themed Monger that appeared in Taiyo Sentai Sun Vulcan: The Movie.
- Sea Snake Monger (ウミヘビモンガー, Umihebi Mongā): A sea snake-themed Monger with sea snake-headed hands.
- Hungry Monger (ハラペコモンガー, Harapeko Mongā): A cooking pot-headed food-themed Monger created by Queen Hedrian.
- Alien Monger (エイリアンモンガー, Eirian Mongā): A mosquito/alien-themed Monger created from a space mosquito that stowed away on the same spaceship that brought Amazon Killer to Earth.
- Crystal Monger (クリスタルモンガー, Kurisutaru Mongā): A crystal-themed Monger.
- Rose Monger (バラモンガー, Bara Mongā): A rose-themed Monger.
- Buffalo Monger (バッファローモンガー, Baffaro Mongā): A bison-themed Monger.
- Thunder Monger (カミナリモンガー, Kaminari Mongā): A Raijin-themed Monger.
- Flat Monger (ペッタンモンガー, Pettan Mongā): A postage stamp-themed Monger.
- Crab Monger (カニモンガー, Kani Mongā): A crab-themed Monger.
- Curse Monger (ノロイモンガー, Noroi Mongā): A spiritualist-themed Monger who was created on Queen Hedrian's behalf to summon the spirits of Count Dracula, Billy the Kid, and Joan of Arc.
- Cockroach Monger (ゴキブリモンガー, Gokiburi Mongā): A cockroach-themed Monger.
- Satan Monger (サターンモンガー, Satan Mongā): A Satan-themed Monger.
- Totem Pole Monger (トーテムポールモンガー, Tōtemu Pōru Mongā): A totem pole-themed Monger.
- Centipede Monger (ムカデモンガー, Mukade Mongā): A centipede-themed Monger.
- Bat Monger (コウモリモンガー, Kōmori Mongā): A bat-themed Monger.
- Teakettle Monger (チャガマモンガー, Chagama Mongā): A shapeshifting kettle/tanuki-themed Monger.
- Dragon Monger (ドラゴンモンガー, Doragon Mongā): A Japanese dragon-themed Monger created by Führer Hell Satan.
- Mechanic Monger (メカメカモンガー, Mekameka Mongā): A computer-themed Monger.
- Flying Squirrel Monger (ムササビモンガー, Musasabi Mongā): A flying squirrel-themed Monger.
- Boxer Monger (ボクサーモンガー, Bokusa Mongā): A stone-headed boxer-themed Monger.
- Deathtrap Monger (シノワナモンガー, Shinowana Mongā): A bear trap-themed Monger.
- Fighter Monger (ファイターモンガー, Faita Mongā): A football player/warrior-themed Monger developed by Inazuma Ginga.
- Mummy Monger (ミイラモンガー, Miira Mong): A mummy-themed Monger. It was supposed to be born as Samson Monger (サムソンモンガー, Samuson Mongā) upon being created by Queen Hedrian and Amazon Killer only for a sabotage to the Monger Maker implied to have been caused by the Omnipotent God's corruption of it caused to be born as Mummy Monger.

== Episodes ==
| No. | Title | Directed by | Written by | Original release date |
|---|---|---|---|---|
| 1 | "The Machine Empire of the North Pole" "Hokkyoku no Kikai Teikoku" (北極の機械帝国) | Koichi Takemoto | Shozo Uehara | February 7, 1981 |
| 2 | "The Day Mankind Is Annihilated" "Jinrui ga Shōmetsu Suru Hi" (人類が消滅する日) | Koichi Takemoto | Shozo Uehara | February 14, 1981 |
| 3 | "The Iron Claw Challenges Japan" "Nihon ni Idomu Tetsu no Tsume" (日本に挑む鉄の爪) | Koichi Takemoto | Shozo Uehara | February 21, 1981 |
| 4 | "The Boy Detective And The Spy" "Shōnen Tantei to Supai" (少年探偵とスパイ) | Koichi Takemoto | Shozo Uehara | February 28, 1981 |
| 5 | "The Wicked Sun God" "Jāku na Taiyōshin" (邪悪な太陽神) | Yoshiaki Kobayashi | Shozo Uehara | March 7, 1981 |
| 6 | "The House Ruled by Machines" "Kikai no Shihai Suru Ie" (機械の支配する家) | Yoshiaki Kobayashi | Shozo Uehara | March 14, 1981 |
| 7 | "Tears of the Beast Batter" "Yajū Battā to Namida" (野獣バッターと涙) | Takafumi Hattori | Shozo Uehara | March 21, 1981 |
| 8 | "Father Sings a Song of Diligence" "Chichi ga Utau Temari Uta" (父が歌う手まり唄) | Takafumi Hattori | Shozo Uehara | March 28, 1981 |
| 9 | "Papa Became a Monster" "Kaibutsu ni Natta Papa" (怪物になったパパ) | Yoshiaki Kobayashi | Shozo Uehara | April 4, 1981 |
| 10 | "The Poison Spider Mansion Ambush" "Machibuse Doku-gumo Yakata" (待ちぶせ毒ぐも館) | Yoshiaki Kobayashi | Hirohisa Soda | April 11, 1981 |
| 11 | "The Mecha Girl of Sadness" "Kanashimi no Meka Shōjo" (哀しみのメカ少女) | Shohei Tojo | Hirohisa Soda | April 18, 1981 |
| 12 | "The Queen Who Eats Diamonds" "Daiya o Kuu Joō" (ダイヤを食う女王) | Shohei Tojo | Shozo Uehara | April 25, 1981 |
| 13 | "The Living Black Ball" "Seimei o Motsu Kuroi Tama" (生命を持つ黒い玉) | Kimio Hirayama | Shozo Uehara | May 2, 1981 |
| 14 | "The Day the Earth Surrenders" "Chikyū ga Kōfuku Suru Hi" (地球が降伏する日) | Kimio Hirayama | Susumu Takaku | May 9, 1981 |
| 15 | "The Queen's Greed Dance" "Joō no Yokubari Odori" (女王の欲ばり踊り) | Shohei Tojo | Hirohisa Soda | May 16, 1981 |
| 16 | "A Demon Runs the Schoolyard" "Akuma ga Kōtei o Hashiru" (悪魔が校庭を走る) | Shohei Tojo | Shozo Uehara | May 23, 1981 |
| 17 | "Ghost Story! The Valley of Goblins" "Kaidan! Obake no Tani" (怪談！お化けの谷) | Yoshiaki Kobayashi | Hirohisa Soda | May 30, 1981 |
| 18 | "The Surprising Big Star" "Bikkuri Dai Sutā" (びっくり大スター) | Yoshiaki Kobayashi | Shozo Uehara | June 6, 1981 |
| 19 | "The Dangerous 100-Point Boy" "Kiken na Hyakuten Shōnen" (危険な100点少年) | Takafumi Hattori | Hirohisa Soda | June 13, 1981 |
| 20 | "The Machine Wrestler's Trap" "Kikai Resurā no Wana" (機械レスラーの罠) | Takafumi Hattori | Shozo Uehara | June 20, 1981 |
| 21 | "Love Brought by the Sea Breeze" "Shiokaze ga Hakobu Ai" (潮風がはこぶ愛) | Shohei Tojo | Akiyoshi Sakai | June 27, 1981 |
| 22 | "Tokyo Big Panic!" "Tōkyō Dai Panikku!" (東京大パニック！) | Shohei Tojo | Mikio Matsushita | July 4, 1981 |
| 23 | "Galaxy Haunts' Female Commander" "Ginga Makkyō no Onna Taichō" (銀河魔境の女隊長) | Kimio Hirayama | Shozo Uehara | July 11, 1981 |
| 24 | "Hamanako's Nessie" "Hamanako no Nesshī" (浜名湖のネッシー) | Kimio Hirayama | Shozo Uehara | July 18, 1981 |
| 25 | "The Hole of the Shocking Sea Serpent" "Dokkiri Umihebi no Ana" (ドッキリ海蛇の穴) | Kimio Hirayama | Hirohisa Soda | August 1, 1981 |
| 26 | "Starving Filling Cooking" "Harapeko Manpuku Ryōri" (ハラペコ満腹料理) | Kimio Hirayama | Shozo Uehara | August 8, 1981 |
| 27 | "A Midsummer Night's Great Fear" "Manatsu no Yoru no Dai Kyōfu" (真夏の夜の大恐怖) | Yoshiaki Kobayashi | Shozo Uehara | August 15, 1981 |
| 28 | "Is Sukehachi Friend or Foe?" "Sukehachi wa Teki ka Mikata ka" (助八は敵か味方か) | Shohei Tojo | Shozo Uehara | August 22, 1981 |
| 29 | "Pretty Swordsman, White Rose Mask" "Bikenshi Shiro Bara Kamen" (美剣士白バラ仮面) | Shohei Tojo | Hirohisa Soda | August 29, 1981 |
| 30 | "Dream of the Giant Monster's Big Riot" "Ōabare Yume no Daikaijū" (大暴れ夢の大怪獣) | Kimio Hirayama | Shozo Uehara | September 5, 1981 |
| 31 | "Big Tokyo Numbing Ondo" "Dai Tōkyō Shibire Ondo" (大東京シビレ音頭) | Kimio Hirayama | Tomomi Tsutsui | September 12, 1981 |
| 32 | "Arrest the Face-Thief" "Kao Dorobō o Taiho Seyo" (顔泥棒を逮捕せよ) | Yoshiaki Kobayashi | Hirohisa Soda | September 19, 1981 |
| 33 | "The Hateful, Stylish Thief" "Nikui Oshare Dorobō" (憎いおしゃれ泥棒) | Shohei Tojo | Hirohisa Soda | September 26, 1981 |
| 34 | "The Cursed Dead" "Norowareta Bōrei Tachi" (呪われた亡霊たち) | Shohei Tojo | Tomomi Tsutsui | October 3, 1981 |
| 35 | "Friends!? La Cucaracha" "Tomodachi!? Kukaratcha" (友達！？クカラッチャ) | Kimio Hirayama | Hirohisa Soda | October 10, 1981 |
| 36 | "The Esper" "Esupā" (エスパー) | Kimio Hirayama | Shozo Uehara | October 17, 1981 |
| 37 | "Himiko!" "Himiko yo" (日見子よ) | Kimio Hirayama | Shozo Uehara | October 24, 1981 |
| 38 | "Asao Hyou's Master Father" "Hyō Asao no Oyaji Dono" (豹朝夫のおやじ殿) | Akira Kashima | Shozo Uehara | October 31, 1981 |
| 39 | "Falling on Her Rear, Tomboy Daughter" "Shirimochi Otenba Musume" (尻もちおてんば娘) | Takafumi Hattori | Tomomi Tsutsui | November 7, 1981 |
| 40 | "The Best Friend Assassination Angel" "Nakayoshi Ansatsu Tenshi" (なかよし暗殺天使) | Takafumi Hattori | Hirohisa Soda | November 14, 1981 |
| 41 | "Seven Changing Doronpa Raccoon-Dogs" "Shichi Bake Doronpa Tanuki" (七化けドロンパ狸) | Shohei Tojo | Tomomi Tsutsui | November 21, 1981 |
| 42 | "Daydreams of Boys Who Sleep In" "Nebō Shōnen no Hakuchūmu" (寝坊少年の白昼夢) | Shohei Tojo | Hirohisa Soda | November 28, 1981 |
| 43 | "You Can Become a Genius" "Kimi mo Tensai ni Nareru" (君も天才になれる) | Akira Kashima | Akiyoshi Sakai | December 5, 1981 |
| 44 | "The Great Escape: Helicopter Explosion" "Dai Dassō: Heri Bakuha" (大脱走・ヘリ爆破) | Takafumi Hattori | Tomomi Tsutsui | December 12, 1981 |
| 45 | "The Galaxy's Invincible Electric Man" "Ginga Muteki no Denki Otoko" (銀河無敵の電気男) | Minoru Yamada | Shozo Uehara | December 19, 1981 |
| 46 | "The Female Commander's (Secret) Plan" "Onna Taichō no Maruhi Sakusen" (女隊長の（秘）作戦) | Minoru Yamada | Shozo Uehara | December 26, 1981 |
| 47 | "The Machine Empire's Rebellion" "Kikai Teikoku no Hanran" (機械帝国の反乱) | Takafumi Hattori | Shozo Uehara | January 9, 1982 |
| 48 | "The Stolen Giant Aircraft Carrier" "Ubawareta Kyodai Kūbo" (奪われた巨大空母) | Minoru Yamada | Shozo Uehara | January 16, 1982 |
| 49 | "The Queen's Last Apparition Art" "Joō Saigo no Yōma Jutsu" (女王最期の妖魔術) | Minoru Yamada | Shozo Uehara | January 23, 1982 |
| 50 (Final) | "Shine, North Pole Aurora" "Kagayake Hokkyoku Ōrora" (輝け北極オーロラ) | Minoru Yamada | Shozo Uehara | January 30, 1982 |

=== Film ===
A Sun Vulcan movie written by Shozo Uehara and directed by Shohei Tojo was released on July 18, 1981, at the Toei Manga Festival (on the same day episode 24 aired). It takes place some time after episode 23.

== Cast ==
- Ryusuke Owashi: Ryūsuke Kawasaki (川崎 龍介, Kawasaki Ryūsuke)
- Takayuki Hiba: Takayuki Godai (五代 高之, Godai Takayuki)
- Kinya Samejima: Kin'ya Sugi (杉 欣也, Sugi Kin'ya)
- Asao Hyou: Asao Kobayashi (小林 朝夫, Kobayashi Asao)
- Daizaburo Arashiyama: Shin Kishida (岸田 森, Kishida Shin)
- Misa Arashiyama: Yumi Nemoto (根本 由美, Nemoto Yumi)
- Führer Hell Saturn (Voice): Shōzō Iizuka
- Queen Hedrian: Machiko Soga
- Inazuma Gingar (Voice): Takeshi Watabe
- Zero One: Takako Kitagawa
- Zero Two: Mariko Hikashi
- Zero Three: Yuki Udagawa
- Zero Four: Toshiko Takashima (1–4), Kyoko Hiro (5–50)
- Narration: Tōru Ōhira
- Amazon Killer: Yukie Kagawa
- Sun Vulcan Robo: Eiji Kanie

== Songs ==
Opening theme

- "Taiyo Sentai Sun Vulcan" (太陽戦隊サンバルカン, Taiyō Sentai Sanbarukan)
  - Lyrics: Keisuke Yamakawa
  - Composition: Michiaki Watanabe
  - Artist: Akira Kushida & Koorogi '73

Ending themes

- "Wakasa wa Plasma" (若さはプラズマ, Wakasa wa Purazuma; "Youth is a Plasma")
  - Lyrics: Keisuke Yamakawa
  - Composition: Michiaki Watanabe
  - Artist: Akira Kushida
  - Episodes: 1-33
- "Ichi tasu Ni tasu Sun Vulcan" (1たす2たすサンバルカン, Ichi tasu Ni tasu Sanbarukan; "One plus Two plus Sun Vulcan") (Note: The song's title is a play on the word "Sun", which is pronounced the same as San (三) (the Japanese word for "three").)
  - Lyrics: Keisuke Yamakawa
  - Composition: Michiaki Watanabe
  - Artist: Akira Kushida
  - Episodes: 34-50

== International broadcast ==
In the Philippines, the series was aired on BBC-2 from 1984 to 1985.

Marvel Productions commissioned a sizzle reel for an English-language adaptation in the vein of what would later become Mighty Morphin Power Rangers. Stan Lee attempted to sell the show to multiple American broadcasters.
