= Kenji Takahashi =

Kenji Takahashi may refer to:

- Kenji Takahashi (footballer, born 1970) (高橋 健二), Japanese footballer
- Kenji Takahashi (sailor) (高橋 賢次, born 1982), Japanese sailor
- Kenji Takahashi (racing driver), Japanese racing driver, twice winner of the 1000 km Suzuka
- Kenji Takahashi a.k.a. Kenji Ohba, actor
- Kenji Takahashi (voice actor) (高橋 研二), Japanese voice actor
- Kenji Takahashi (illustrator) (高橋 けんじ), Japanese illustrator
