= Machiko Soga =

Japanese actress (1938–2006)

- 曽我 町子
- Soga as Bandora in Kyōryū Sentai Zyuranger of the Super Sentai Series. Scenes of her character were redubbed in English and used as Rita Repulsa for Mighty Morphin Power Rangers.
- Born: March 18, 1938; Hachioji, Tokyo, Japan
- Died: May 7, 2006 (aged 68); Kunitachi, Tokyo, Japan
- Resting place: Tama Cemetery, Tokyo, Japan
- Other names: Stella Soga (ステラ 曽我, Sutera Soga)
- Occupations: Actress; voice actress
- Years active: 1956–2006

Machiko Soga (曽我 町子, Soga Machiko; March 18, 1938 – May 7, 2006) was a Japanese actress and voice actress. She also performed by the stage name Stella Soga. She is best known globally for providing the physical performance of supervillain Rita Repulsa in Mighty Morphin Power Rangers through footage adapted from her role as Bandora the Witch in Kyōryū Sentai Zyuranger.

== Life and career ==
=== Early life and family ===
Machiko was born on March 18, 1938, in Hachioji, Tokyo, Japan. She had a humble upbringing and was raised to be a singer, though her talents were with acting. Her mother died when she was a child; she was raised by her father. She had two brothers and a sister. One of her brothers died during the Second World War. Her father died of cancer in 1991.

She studied at Tokyo Metropolitan Minamitama High School. During high school, she was best at science and mathematics and made her own lotions. She decided to pursue a career in acting to overcome stage fright after she failed a chemistry presentation at school. She later graduated from Tokyo Announce Academy. In 1973, she went to study in Italy for two years.

=== Career ===
She was "discovered" after doing a play in Tokyo Center. From that night on, her life would forever change as she met many important figures in the world of Japanese television.

She made her debut on NHK's children's show Minna issho in 1956. After taking jazz dance lessons for a number of years, her first roles were mainly radio and voice character roles. After appearing in NHK's radio drama Chorinmura to Kurumi no Ki (1961), she gained fame as the first voice actress to portray the lovable ghost Q-taro in Obake no Q-Tarō (TBS, 1965–1968).

She appeared in numerous tokusatsu films and series and played many villainous roles in the Super Sentai franchise such as Queen Hedrian in Denziman and Sun Vulcan. She also appeared in Maskman portraying Tube Empire's field commander, Baraba's mother for one episode, as well as the evil sorceress Bandora in Zyuranger, better known to audiences in English speaking countries as Rita Repulsa in the American adaptation of Zyuranger, Mighty Morphin Power Rangers. In an odd twist, she soon found herself re-dubbing her own lines as Rita when Power Rangers was broadcast in Japan after the show became a surprise hit in America. Her final tokusatsu role was Magiel, Queen of the Sky Saints in Magiranger, which incidentally was one of her few non-villainous roles. In her memory, the producers of Power Rangers: Mystic Force used footage of Soga as Magiel to depict a reformed Rita Repulsa in the two-part final episode of Mystic Force, "Mystic Fate".

In 1983, she opened an antiques shop in Harajuku, Tokyo, as a side-business alongside her acting career, inspired by her antique art collection hobby.

Her very final role was in the PlayStation 2 game Space Sheriff Spirits as the voice and the "face" of Ankoku Ginga Jyoou (Dark Galaxy Queen), last boss and original character of this game inspired to the 80s Metal Hero series. Soga also played the voices of Cyborg 007 in the 1968 Cyborg 009 anime series and the sidekick Ball Boy in 1984 series Machineman. Machiko also ran her own shop, selling jewellery, antique clothing, and tapestries among other goods.

=== Death ===
In early August 2005, it was revealed that she had been diagnosed with pancreatic cancer about two years earlier. On the morning of May 7, 2006, she was found dead by a friend visiting her home. She was 68 years old. Her interment was in Fuchū, Tokyo's Tama Cemetery. Juken Sentai Gekiranger vs Boukenger was dedicated to her memory.

== Appearances ==
=== Super Sentai/Power Rangers ===
- Battle Fever J (1979, Episode 3) - Death Mask Monster (voice)
- Denshi Sentai Denjiman (1980–1981, 51 episodes) - Queen Hedrian
- Denshi Sentai Denjiman: The Movie (1980) - Queen Hedrian
- Taiyo Sentai Sun Vulcan (1981–1982, 47 episodes) - Queen Hedrian
- Hikari Sentai Maskman (1987, Episode: 30) - Laraba (Barabas's mother)
- Kyōryū Sentai Zyuranger (1992–1993, 49 episodes) - Witch Bandora
- Mighty Morphin Power Rangers (1993–1994, 63 episodes) - Rita Repulsa (via Kyōryū Sentai Zyuranger footage)
- Mahou Sentai Magiranger (2006, Episodes: 48 & 49) - Heavenly Arch Saint Magiel
- Power Rangers: Mystic Force (2006, Episodes: 31 & 32) - Mystic Mother (via Mahou Sentai Magiranger footage)
- Shuriken Sentai Ninninger (2015) - Witch Ninja Madam Spider (via Jiraiya's photo archive footage)

=== Metal Hero ===
- Uchū Keiji Gavan (1982, Episode 21) - Honey Manda (Double Girl disguise) (voice)
- Uchū Keiji Sharivan (1983, Episode 22) - Shinigami Beast (voice)
- Sekai Ninja Sen Jiraiya (1988–1989, 11 episodes) - Witch Ninja Madam Spider
- Jikuu Senshi Spielban (1986–1987, 44 episodes) - Queen Pandora
- VR Troopers (1996) - Desponda (via Jikuu Senshi Spielban footage)

=== Other works ===
- Kamen Rider Stronger (1975, Episodes 27, 29 & 30) - Doctor Kate (voice)
- Batten Robomaru (1982, 51 episodes) - Batten Robomaru (voice)
- West Night
- Hiroshima
- Later It Fell
- Forever
- 5-nen 3-kumi Mahō-gumi (Bellbara the Witch)
- Domuraishi-tachi
- Kugatsu no Sora (Yoshida's mother)
- Miyo-chan no Tame nara: Zen'in Shūgō!!
- Pretty Invader Milli (Steradian)
- Warrior of Love, Rainbowman (God Iguana)
- Seiun Kamen Machineman (1984, 36 episodes) - Ballboy (voice)
- Tōmei Dori-chan (Kikuko Shirakawa)
- TV Champion
- Zatoichi Kenka Daiko (AKA: Samaritan Zatoichi)

=== Anime TV series ===
- Obake no Q-Tarō (first voice of Q-taro)
- Cyborg 009 (1966 series) (voice of Cyborg 007: Great Britain)
- Himitsu no Akko-chan (1969) (Voice of Grandmother)
- Microid S (voice of Mamezō)
- Pyun Pyun Maru (voice of Kemeko)
- Kabatotto (voice of Totto)

=== Anime films ===
- Cyborg 009 (1968 movie) (voice of Cyborg 007: Great Britain)
- Maken Liner 0011: Henshin Seiyo! (voice of Liner)

=== Games ===
- Tengai Makyou: Daishi no Mokushiroku
- Space Sheriff Spirits (voices of Dark Galaxy Queen, Honey Manda, and Mitsubachi Doubler (Double Girl))

=== Songs ===
- Obake no Q-Tarō (Obake no Q-Tarō 8 songs: opening, ending and insert songs)
- Batten Robomaru (Batten Robomaru 3 songs: opening and insert songs)
- Nazo no Onna B
- Majo wa Ijiwaru (5-nen 3-gumi mahogumi ending song)
- Ball Boy no uta (Seiun Kamen Machineman insert song)
- Dora! Majo Bandora no theme (Kyōryū Sentai Zyuranger insert song)
- Ankoku Ginga Jyoou no Blues (Space Sheriff Spirits insert song)

=== Radio ===
- Million Nights (Nazo no Onna B)
