= Denshi Sentai Denjiman =

- Title Screen
- Genre: Tokusatsu; Superhero fiction Science fiction
- Created by: Toei Company
- Developed by: Shozo Uehara
- Directed by: Koichi Takemoto; Itaru Orita; Kimio Hirayama; Yoshiaki Kobayashi; Ichigi Yoshikawa; Takafumi Hattori
- Starring: Shinichi Yuuki; Kenji Ohba; Eiichi Tsuyama; Naoya Uchida; Akira Koizumi; Machiko Soga; Shinji Todo; Chiaki Kojo; Rie Yoshikawa
- Narrated by: Toru Ohira
- Composer: Michiaki Watanabe
- Country of origin: Japan
- No. of episodes: 51 (list of episodes)

Production
- Running time: 30 minutes
- Production companies: Toei Company; TV Asahi

Original release
- Network: ANN (TV Asahi)
- Release: February 2, 1980 – January 31, 1981

Related
- Battle Fever J; Taiyo Sentai Sun Vulcan

Denshi Sentai Denjiman (電子戦隊デンジマン; Electro Squadron Denjiman) (Note: Also spelt as Denziman.) is a Japanese television tokusatsu series broadcast by TV Asahi. The series is the fourth installment of Super Sentai. Directed by Koichi Takemoto, Itaru Orita, Kimio Hirayama, Yoshiaki Kobayashi, Ichigi Yoshikawa and Takafumi Hattori, it stars Shinichi Yuuki, Kenji Ohba, Eiichi Tsuyama, Naoya Uchida, Akira Koizumi, Machiko Soga, Shinji Todo, Chiaki Kojo and Rie Yoshikawa. It aired from February 2, 1980 to January 31, 1981, replacing Battle Fever J and was replaced by Taiyo Sentai Sun Vulcan. The title given to this series for international distribution by Toei is Denjiman, Denziman or Electric Fighters.

== Plot ==
3,000 years ago, the Vader Clan, led by Queen Hedrian, devastated the planet Denji. Denji Land, an island from Denji, landed on Earth. In modern times, the computer of Denji Land awoke the Denji Dog IC when it detected the Vader Clan approaching Earth. IC found five young people (who may or may not be descendants of the Denji people) to become the Denjimen in order to defend Earth, the Vader Clan's next target.

== Characters ==
=== Denjimen ===
The eponymous Denjimen is the first Super Sentai team to use a personal transformation device carried on their person (see below). Their costumes are the first to use helmets with translucent materials for visors (although some exterior footage shows their helmets with perforated visors as was the practice with previous Super Sentai series).

- Ippei Akagi (赤城 一平, Akagi Ippei) / Denji Red (デンジレッド, Denji Reddo): A teacher of karate and other sports to children at the Athletic Club. Twenty years after Denjiman ended, Ippei appeared along with 23 other Red Rangers summoned by Liveman's Red Falcon, in Hyakujuu Sentai Gaoranger vs. Super Sentai.
- Daigoro Oume (青梅 大五郎, Ōme Daigorō) / Denji Blue (デンジブルー, Denji Burū): A circus acrobat who teaches yoga and gymnastics at the Athletic Club and loves anpan. Years later, he becomes an anpan vendor, during which time he encounters the Gokaigers.
- Jun Kiyama (黄山 純, Kiyama Jun) / Denji Yellow (デンジイエロー, Denji Ierō): An inventor and space researcher. He coaches calisthenics.
- Tatsuya Midorikawa (緑川 達也, Midorikawa Tatsuya) / Denji Green (デンジグリーン, Denji Gurīn): A detective who lost his father to a Vader attack. He coaches boxing.
- Akira Momoi (桃井 あきら, Momoi Akira) / Denji Pink (デンジピンク, Denji Pinku): A former tennis player who teaches swimming at the Athletic Club. Quit the team in the first episode but rejoined at the end of episode two. She saw her coach burn to death because of the Vader Clan's first attack.

==== Allies ====
- Denji Dog IC (デンジ犬アイシー, Denji-ken Ai Shī): An intelligent robot dog that came from planet Denji 3000 years ago to assemble the Denjimen. He sacrificed his life to become a circuit for DaiDenjin in order to defeat the Omnipotent Monse.
- Officer Chieko Matsuo (松尾千恵子, Matsuo Chieko): A fellow Police Officer who is good friends and allies with Tatsyua.
- Princess Denji (デンジ姫, Denji-hime): A survivor of planet Denji who visited Earth 3000 years ago, ordering a servant girl to defend the Earth with the rainbow stones. She left Earth to patrol the universe.

=== Vader Clan ===
The Vader Clan (ベーダー一族, Bēdā Ichizoku) are invaders from another dimension with warped (to us) concepts of outer beauty. They intend to pollute and corrupt the Earth and its inhabitants to fit its unusual aesthetic.

- Queen Hedrian (ヘドリアン女王, Hedorian-joō): She hates inner beauty and wants to pollute the world. She finds happiness in human suffering. Cares deeply about her subjects. She vanished and sealed herself away in the North Pole, only to be found by Black Magma in Taiyo Sentai Sun Vulcan and revived as a cyborg under their control.
- General Hedler (ヘドラー将軍, Hedorā-shōgun): The field commander. He had a personal rivalry with Banriki Demon King. He was killed in battle when he interrupted the battle between the Denjimen and Banriki Demon King and Bankiri Monster. He grew giant and fought against the DaiDenjin but fell to the Denji Sword after the Denjimen used the Denji Ball. He was saluted by the Denjimen after being defeated.
- Keller and Mirror (ケラー&ミラー, Kerā to Mirā): The female spies in silver and gold respectively. Keller can change into a shield, and Mirror a vanity mirror. Though Keller only turned into a shield once and that was to defend Queen Hedrian from an attack by Banriki Demon King. Sadly, it cost Keller her life, just as Mirror lost her life defending her Queen by blinding the Omnipotent Demon King.
- Demon King Banriki (バンリキ魔王, Banriki-maō): A half-naked, musclebound space wanderer. He had a personal rivalry with General Hedler. Banriki attacked all the Denjimen until there was Denji Red, not injured in Episode 37 (Denji Yellow blinded in one eye, Denji Green injured by the wind, Denji Blue injured by hand in the water, and Denji Pink being injured by things blowing up around her and getting hit by a van). The others fought through their fight against him. In Episode 37, Banriki grew after fighting Denjimen and was wounded after they used their Denji Boomerang. The Denjimen tried to give him the final blow with the Electronic Full Moon Cut in Episode 37. In Episode 48, he had Sakkalar to help him take over Vader Clan. Banriki was turned into a human candle. With the help of the Bankiri Monster, Banriki turned into a human and took back the Vader Clan. He was finally killed off by the Denji Boomerang.
- Dustlers (ダストラー, Dasutorā): The foot soldiers of the Vader Clan in black tights with skeletal designs who wield sickles. They can teleport from one spot to another.

==== Vader Monsters ====
The Vader Monsters (ベーダー怪物, Bēdā Kaibutsu) are monsters hatched from eggs that all have a specific numbered belt buckle. The number on the buckle is usually the episode number minus one. They all also possess the ability to control their body's Cellular structure and are thus able to make themselves grow larger or smaller. Each time a Vader Monster was destroyed, a bust was made in its honor.

- Musasabilar (ムササビラー, Musasabirā): A flying squirrel-themed Vader Monster with a #00 on its belt buckle.
- Shabonlar (シャボンラー, Shabonrā): A soap bubble-themed Vader Monster with a #01 on its belt buckle.
- Chikagerilar (チカゲリラー, Chikagerirā): An unspecified Vader Monster with a #02 on its belt buckle.
- Rupankamelar (ルパンカメラー, Rupankamerā): A camera-themed Vader Monster with a #03 on its belt buckle.
- Tsutakazular (ツタカズラー, Tsutakazurā): A nepenthes-themed Vader Monster with a #04 on its belt buckle.
- Higekitakolar (ヒゲキタコラー, Higekitakorā): An octopus-themed Vader Monster with a #05 on its belt buckle.
- Umitsular (ウミツラー, Umitsurā): A marine life/fishing tackle-themed Vader Monster with a #06 on its belt buckle.
- Firumular (フィルムラー, Firumurā): A projector-themed Vader Monster with a #07 on its belt buckle.
- Denwalar (デンワラー, Denwarā): A telephone-themed Vader Monster with a #08 on its belt buckle.
- Hambular (ハンバラー, Hanbarā): A hamburger-themed Vader Monster with a #09 on its belt buckle.
- Taiyajikolar (タイヤジコラー, Taiyajikorā): A tire-themed Vader Monster with a #10 on its belt buckle.
- Balar (バーラー, Bārā): A rose-themed Vader Monster with a #11 on its belt buckle.
- Adobaloolar (アドバルラー, Adobarurā): A balloon-themed Vader Monster with a #12 on its belt buckle.
- Jukular (ジュクラー, Jukurā): A pencil-themed Vader Monster with a #13 on its belt buckle.
- Panchirolar (パンチローラー, Panchirōrā): A roller skates-themed Vader Monster with a #14 on its belt buckle.
- Samelar (サメラー, Samerā): A shark-themed Vader Monster with a #15 on its belt buckle.
- Deadbolar (デッドボーラー, Deddobōrā): A baseball-themed Vader Monster with a #16 on its belt buckle.
- Kaigalar (カイガラー, Kaigarā): A seashell-themed Vader Monster with a #19 on its belt buckle.
- Gamalar (ガマラー, Gamarā): A frog-themed Vader Monster with a #17 on its belt buckle.
- Hachidokular (ハチドクラー, Hachidokurā): A honeycomb-themed Vader Monster with a #18 on its belt buckle.
- Rousokular (ローソクラー, Rōsokurā): A candle-themed Vader Monster with a #20 on its belt buckle.
- Taimular (タイムラー, Taimurā): A clock-themed Vader Monster with a #21 on its belt buckle.
- Kokelar (コケラー, Kokerā): A moss-themed Vader Monster with a #22 on its belt buckle.
- Hamigakilar (ハミガキラー, Hamigakirā): A tooth-themed Vader Monster with a #25 on its belt buckle.
- Angolar (アンゴラー, Angorā): A footballfish-themed Vader Monster with no number on it that appeared in Denshi Sentai Denjiman: The Movie.
- Medamalar (メダマラー, Medamarā): An eye-themed Vader Monster with a #23 on its belt buckle.
- Rekolar (レコーラー, Rekōrā): A phonograph-themed Vader Monster with a #24 on its belt buckle.
- Kilar (キーラー, Kīrā): A tree stump-themed Vader Monster with a #26 on its belt buckle.
- Nazolar (ナゾラー, Nazorā): A riddle-themed Vader Monster with a #27 on its belt buckle.
- Sabimushilar (サビムシラー, Sabimushirā): A hornworm-themed Vader Monster with a #28 on its belt buckle.
- Chōchinlar (チョウチンラー, Chōchinrā): A paper lantern-themed Vader Monster with a #29 on its belt buckle.
- Mimilar (ミミラー, Mimirā): An ear-themed Vader Monster with a #30 on its belt buckle.
- Datolar (ダートラー, Dātorā): A darts-themed Vader Monster with a #31 on its belt buckle.
- Saxophonelar (サキソホンラー, Sakisohonrā): A saxophone-themed Vader Monster with a #32 on its belt buckle.
- Bidamalar (ビーダマラー, Bīdamarā): A marbles-themed Vader Monster with a #33 on its belt buckle.
- Dokugalar (ドクガラー, Dokugarā): A moth-themed Vader Monster with a #34 on its belt buckle.
- Noranekolar (ノラネコラー, Noranekorā): A stray cat-themed Vader Monster with a #35 on its belt buckle.
- Kamakilar (カマキラー, Kamakirā): A mantis-themed Vader Monster with a #36 on its belt buckle.
- Akumalar (アクマラー, Akumarā): A devil-themed Vader Monster with a #38 on its belt buckle.
- Pikarilar (ピカリラー, Pikarirā): A lighting-themed Vader Monster with a #39 on its belt buckle.
- Jishinlar (ジシンラー, Jishinrā): A fossil-themed Vader Monster with a #40 on its belt buckle.
- Ninpolar (ニンポーラー, Ninpōrā): An Archaeopteryx-themed Vader Monster with a #41 on its belt buckle.
- Desumasukular (デスマスクラー, Desumasukurā): A dress-themed Vader Monster with a #42 on its belt buckle.
- Arazinlar (アラジンラー, Arajinrā): A genie-themed Vader Monster with a #43 on its belt buckle.
- Onilar (オニラー, Onirā): An Oni-themed Vader Monster with a #44 on its belt buckle.
- Torikagolar (トリカゴラー, Torikagorā): A birdcage-themed Vader Monster with a #45 on its belt buckle.
- Botolar (ボートラー, Bōtorā): A boat-themed Vader Monster with a #46 on its belt buckle.
- Sakkalar (サッカラー, Sakkarā): A soccer ball-themed Vader Monster with a #47 on its belt buckle.
- Kendamalar (ケンダマラー, Kendamarā): A kendama-themed Vader Monster with a #49 on its belt buckle.
- Karakurilar (カラクリラー, Karakurirā): A Karakuri puppet-themed Vader Monster with a #48 on its belt buckle.

== Episodes ==
No.	Title	Directed by	Written by	Original release date
1	"Take the Express to the Super Fortress"; Transliteration: "Chō Yōsai e Kyūkō Seyo" (Japanese: 超要塞へ急行せよ)	Koichi Takemoto	Shozo Uehara	February 2, 1980
2	"The Cannibalism Soap Bubbles"; Transliteration: "Hito-kui Shabondama" (Japanese: 人喰いシャボン玉)	Koichi Takemoto	Shozo Uehara	February 9, 1980
3	"Oil Hell, Big Panic"; Transliteration: "Abura Jigoku Dai Panikku" (Japanese: 油地獄大パニック)	Koichi Takemoto	Shozo Uehara	February 16, 1980
4	"Vader Demon Castle, Pursuit"; Transliteration: "Bēdā Majō Tsuigeki" (Japanese: ベーダー魔城追撃)	Koichi Takemoto	Shozo Uehara	February 23, 1980
5	"The Red Poison Flower That Crawls up the Wall"; Transliteration: "Kabe ni Ugomeku Akai Doku Bana" (Japanese: 壁に蠢く赤い毒花)	Itaru Orita	Shozo Uehara	March 1, 1980
6	"A Girl's Demon Offshoot"; Transliteration: "Akuma Bunshin no Shōjo" (Japanese: 悪魔分身の少女)	Itaru Orita	Shozo Uehara	March 8, 1980
7	"The Great Tragedy of Planet Denji"; Transliteration: "Denjisei no Dai Higeki" (Japanese: デンジ星の大悲劇)	Koichi Takemoto	Shozo Uehara	March 15, 1980
8	"The Skeleton Town's Great Demon King"; Transliteration: "Hakkotsu Toshi no Dai Maō" (Japanese: 白骨都市の大魔王)	Koichi Takemoto	Takashi Ezure	March 22, 1980
9	"The Bizarre Telephone That Calls Death"; Transliteration: "Shi o Yobu Kaiki Denwa" (Japanese: 死を呼ぶ怪奇電話)	Koichi Takemoto	Shozo Uehara	March 29, 1980
10	"I Love Witchcraft Cuisine!?"; Transliteration: "Mahō Ryōri Daisuki!?" (Japanese: 魔法料理大好き！？)	Itaru Orita	Shozo Uehara	April 5, 1980
11	"Chase the Life-Stealer"; Transliteration: "Inochi Dorobō o Oe" (Japanese: いのち泥棒を追え)	Itaru Orita	Shozo Uehara	April 12, 1980
12	"The Dangerous Child Spy"; Transliteration: "Kiken na Kodomo Supai" (Japanese: 危険な子供スパイ)	Koichi Takemoto	Shozo Uehara	April 19, 1980
13	"The Rainbow-Colored Balloon is Torn"; Transliteration: "Wareta Niji-iro no Fūsen" (Japanese: 割れた虹色の風船)	Koichi Takemoto	Takeshi Ezure	April 26, 1980
14	"Come to the 100-Point Cram School"; Transliteration: "Hyakuten-Juku e Oide" (Japanese: 100点塾へおいで)	Kimio Hirayama	Shozo Uehara	May 3, 1980
15	"An Invitation to the Garden of Evil"; Transliteration: "Aku no Sono e no Shōtaijō" (Japanese: 悪の園への招待状)	Kimio Hirayama	Shozo Uehara	May 10, 1980
16	"Smash the Conspiracy at Atami"; Transliteration: "Atami no Inbō o Kudake" (Japanese: 熱海の陰謀を砕け)	Koichi Takemoto	Shozo Uehara	May 17, 1980
17	"Don't Cry! Baseball Novice"; Transliteration: "Naku na! Yakyū Kozō" (Japanese: 泣くな！野球小僧)	Koichi Takemoto	Takeshi Ezure	May 24, 1980
18	"Romance Blooms at the Southern Sea"; Transliteration: "Nankai ni Saku Roman" (Japanese: 南海に咲くロマン)	Koichi Takemoto	Hirohisa Soda	May 31, 1980
19	"My Prince of the Stars"; Transliteration: "Watashi no Hoshi no Ōjisama" (Japanese: 私の星の王子さま)	Itaru Orita	Shozo Uehara	June 7, 1980
20	"Gorilla Boy's Great Riot"; Transliteration: "Gorira Shōnen Ōbare" (Japanese: ゴリラ少年大暴れ)	Itaru Orita	Susumu Takaku	June 14, 1980
21	"Attack the Grim Reaper Faction"; Transliteration: "Shinigami Tō o Kōgeki Seyo" (Japanese: 死神党を攻撃せよ！)	Yoshiaki Kobayashi	Shozo Uehara	June 21, 1980
22	"Super Time, Strange Experience"; Transliteration: "Chō Jikan Fushigi Taiken" (Japanese: 超時間ふしぎ体験)	Yoshiaki Kobayashi	Shozo Uehara	June 28, 1980
23	"A Demon That Walks Above the Ceiling"; Transliteration: "Tenjōura o Aruku Akuma" (Japanese: 天井裏を歩く悪魔)	Ichigi Yoshikawa	Hirohisa Soda	July 5, 1980
24	"The Man With the Mysterious Power to Affix Traps"; Transliteration: "Wana o Haru Kairiki Otoko" (Japanese: 罠をはる怪力男)	Ichigi Yoshikawa	Takashi Ezure	July 12, 1980
25	"The Tiger's Hole is an Escape Maze"; Transliteration: "Tora no Ana wa Tōsō Meiro" (Japanese: 虎の穴は逃走迷路)	Kimio Hirayama	Hirohisa Soda	July 19, 1980
26	"Princess Denji's Space Tune"; Transliteration: "Denji-hime no Uchū Kyoku" (Japanese: デンジ姫の宇宙曲)	Kimio Hirayama	Shozo Uehara	July 26, 1980
27	"Red Beetle Bomb"; Transliteration: "Akai Kabutomushi Bakudan" (Japanese: 赤いカブト虫爆弾)	Yoshiaki Kobayashi	Susumu Takaku	August 2, 1980
28	"The Secret Butcher of the Cursed House"; Transliteration: "Noroi no Yakata no Missatsusha" (Japanese: 呪いの館の密殺者)	Yoshiaki Kobayashi	Shozo Uehara	August 9, 1980
29	"The ESPer Detective's Raid"; Transliteration: "Chōnōryoku Keiji no Kyūshū" (Japanese: 超能力刑事の急襲)	Koichi Takemoto	Shozo Uehara	August 16, 1980
30	"Missing, Stolen, Gone"; Transliteration: "Kieta Nusunda Deta" (Japanese: 消えた盗んだ出た)	Koichi Takemoto	Hirohisa Soda	August 23, 1980
31	"The Magician's Battle of Secret Arts"; Transliteration: "Mahōtsukai Hijutsu Gassen" (Japanese: 魔法使い秘術合戦)	Koichi Takemoto	Shozo Uehara	August 30, 1980
32	"Hell's Great Shooting Battle"; Transliteration: "Jigoku no Dai Jūgekisen" (Japanese: 地獄の大銃撃戦)	Takafumi Hattori	Susumu Takaku	September 6, 1980
33	"The Bloodsucking Instrument Lesson"; Transliteration: "Kyūketsu Gakki Ressun" (Japanese: 吸血楽器レッスン)	Takafumi Hattori	Shozo Uehara	September 13, 1980
34	"The Sad Orphan's Tale"; Transliteration: "Kanashii Sutego no Monogatari" (Japanese: 哀しい捨て子の物語)	Koichi Takemoto	Hirohisa Soda	September 27, 1980
35	"The Puzzling Weaver Princess"; Transliteration: "Nazo no Hataori Hime" (Japanese: 謎のはたおり姫)	Koichi Takemoto	Hirohisa Soda	October 4, 1980
36	"Poem of the Brave Puppy"; Transliteration: "Yūki Aru Koinu no Uta" (Japanese: 勇気ある仔犬の詩)	Koichi Takemoto	Hirohisa Soda	October 11, 1980
37	"Brute Force Banriki Devil King"; Transliteration: "Banriki Banriki-maō" (Japanese: 蛮力バンリキ魔王)	Yoshiaki Kobayashi	Hirohisa Soda	October 18, 1980
38	"The Infinite Demon Sky's Great Adventure"; Transliteration: "Mugen Makū no Daibōken" (Japanese: 無限魔空の大冒険)	Yoshiaki Kobayashi	Shozo Uehara	October 25, 1980
39	"The Queen's Angry Apparition Art"; Transliteration: "Joō Ikari no Yōmajutsu" (Japanese: 女王怒りの妖魔術)	Koichi Takemoto	Shozo Uehara	November 1, 1980
40	"The Champion's Enemy"; Transliteration: "Chanpion no Teki" (Japanese: チャンピオンの敵)	Koichi Takemoto	Shozo Uehara	November 8, 1980
41	"The Greatest All-Out War in History"; Transliteration: "Shijō Saidai no Sōryokusen" (Japanese: 史上最大の総力戦)	Takafumi Hattori	Shozo Uehara	November 15, 1980
42	"The Bad Dream That Ate Boys"; Transliteration: "Shōnen o Kuu Warui Yume" (Japanese: 少年を喰う悪い夢)	Takafumi Hattori	Hirohisa Soda	November 22, 1980
43	"The Puzzling Spectrum Lady"; Transliteration: "Nazonazo Nanairo Redi" (Japanese: 謎なぞ七色レディ)	Koichi Takemoto	Takashi Ezure	November 29, 1980
44	"The Tale of the Strange Lamp"; Transliteration: "Fushigi Ranpu Monogatari" (Japanese: 不思議ランプ物語)	Koichi Takemoto	Shozo Uehara	December 6, 1980
45	"Princess Denji was Two People"; Transliteration: "Futari Ita Denji-hime" (Japanese: 二人いたデンジ姫)	Takafumi Hattori	Hirohisa Soda	December 13, 1980
46	"Starvation Hell X Plan"; Transliteration: "Harapeko Jigoku Ekkusu Keikaku" (Japanese: 腹ペコ地獄X計画)	Takafumi Hattori	Hirohisa Soda	December 20, 1980
47	"The Mermaid Who Disappeared in the Morning Sun"; Transliteration: "Asahi ni Kieta Ningyo" (Japanese: 朝日に消えた人魚)	Takafumi Hattori	Hirohisa Soda	December 27, 1980
48	"Demon King Banriki's Rebellion"; Transliteration: "Banriki-maō Hanran" (Japanese: バンリキ魔王反乱)	Yoshiaki Kobayashi	Shozo Uehara	January 10, 1981
49	"Vader Castle Big Disaster"; Transliteration: "Bēdā-jō Daiihen" (Japanese: ベーダー城大異変)	Yoshiaki Kobayashi	Shozo Uehara	January 17, 1981
50	"The General Dies Twice"; Transliteration: "Shōgun wa Nido Shinu" (Japanese: 将軍は二度死ぬ)	Itaru Orita	Shozo Uehara	January 24, 1981
51 (Final)	"Resound, Bells of Hope!"; Transliteration: "Hibike Kibō no Kane yo" (Japanese: ひびけ希望の鐘よ)	Itaru Orita	Shozo Uehara	January 31, 1981

== Movie ==
The movie for Denshi Sentai Denjiman (written by Shozo Uehara and directed by Koichi Takemoto) premiered during the Toei Manga Matsuri film festival on July 12, 1980, the same day episode 24 aired. The character of Princess Denji makes her first appearance in this film and is referenced in two later episodes of the series (26 & 45), placing the events of this film sometime before Episode 26.

== Cast ==
- Ippei Akagi: Shinichi Yuuki (結城 真一, Yūki Shin'ichi)
- Daigoro Oume: Kenji Ohba (大葉 健二, Ōba Kenji)
- Jun Kiyama: Eiichi Tsuyama (津山 栄一, Tsuyama Eiichi)
- Tatsuya Midorikawa: Naoya Uchida (内田 直哉, Uchida Naoya)
- Akira Momoi: Akira Koizumi (小泉 あきら, Koizumi Akira)
- Queen Hedrian: Machiko Soga (曽我 町子, Soga Machiko)
- Denji Dog IC (Voice): Hisako Kyōda
- Officer Chieko Matsuo: Yukie Sakai
- Princess Denji: Tamaki Funakura (舟倉 たまき, Funakura Tamaki)
- General Hedler: Shinji Tōdō (藤堂 新二, Tōdō Shinji)
- Demon King Banriki: Kin Oomae
- Mirror: Rie Yoshikawa
- Keller: Chiaki Kojo
- Constable Matsuo Tieko: Yukie Sakai
- Vader Monsters: Shōzō Iizuka (飯塚 昭三, Īzuka Shōzō) (Majority of Episodes)

== Songs ==
Opening theme

- "Ah Denshi Sentai Denjiman" (ああ電子戦隊デンジマン, Aa Denshi Sentai Denjiman; "Oh Denshi Sentai Denjiman")
  - Lyrics: Kazuo Koike
  - Composition & Arrangement: Michiaki Watanabe
  - Artist: Ken Narita, Koorogi '73

Ending theme

- "Denjiman ni Makasero!" (デンジマンにまかせろ！, Denjiman ni Makasero!; "Leave it to Denjiman!")
  - Lyrics: Kazuo Koike
  - Composition & Arrangement: Michiaki Watanabe
  - Artist: Ken Narita
