= Takayuki Godai =

Japanese actor

- 五代 高之
- Born: July 1, 1956 (age 70); Tokyo, Japan
- Occupations: Actor, voice actor
- Years active: 1979-present

Takayuki Godai (五代高之, Godai Takayuki; born July 1, 1956) is a Japanese actor best known as the shōgun's ninja Saizō in the long-running prime-time television jidaigeki Abarenbō Shōgun. Godai first appeared as Saizō in Episode 57 of Series III, and continued through Series IV and V, about 190 episodes. He is also a voice actor. He has had important roles in Taiyo Sentai Sun Vulcan, and as the villain Akudaikaan in Futari wa Pretty Cure Splash Star.

== Biography ==
His stage name is the name of the character portrayed by Yujiro Ishihara in the 1969 film Eiko e no 5,000 kiro.

In film, Godai played the male lead opposite Rina Akiyama in the 2006 horror film Eko eko azaraku: B-page. He appeared in the 1985 Shiosai, an adaptation of The Sound of Waves by Yukio Mishima. He also played a role in Moonlight Mask (the 1981 movie version).

Godai appeared live on stage at a special performance Koi densetsu: Ai sureba koso by Yōko Nagayama.

== Filmography ==
=== Tokusatsu ===
- Taiyo Sentai Sun Vulcan (1981-1982, TV Series, Takayuki Hiba)
- Ninja Sentai Kakuranger (1994, TV Series, Hakumenro)
- Engine Sentai Go-onger (2008, Savage Land Barbaric Machine Beast Nokogiri Banki/Chainsaw Banki)

=== Anime ===
- Fullmetal Alchemist (2003, Magwar)
- Futari wa Pretty Cure Splash Star (2004, Akudaikaan)
