= The Space Sheriff Spirits =

2006 video game

- Developer: Namco Bandai Games
- Publisher: Namco Bandai Games
- Platform: PlayStation 2
- Release: JP: May 25, 2006
- Genre: Action
- Mode: Single player

The Space Sheriff Spirits (宇宙刑事魂, Uchū Keiji Tamashii; lit. "Space Detective Spirit"), is an action game for the PlayStation 2. This game is based on the popular Japanese live-action TV series Space Sheriff trilogy produced by Toei Company.

The game was simultaneously released on May 25, 2006 in Japan, Hong Kong and Taiwan.

Kenji Ohba and Hiroshi Watari reprised their roles as Gavan and Sharivan, respectively. Takuo Kawamura took over as the voice of Shaider, as Hiroshi Tsuburaya died in 2001.

== Story ==
- Gavan Mode

TV series based

- The Space Sheriff Spirits Mode

The crossover 1984 TV special based + original elements

== Game modes (translation) ==
=== Gavan Mode ===
Play as Retsu Ichijoji (Gavan), and as Kojiro Aoyama in two stages, in this story mode based on the Space Sheriff Gavan TV series. The plot is followed by stills taken from the most important episodes. The player has the ability to pick up and throw items in this game mode.

- Mission 1 (episode 1 of the series)
- Mission 2 (quick summarize of episode 13, based on episode 14)
- Mission 3 (episode 24)
- Mission 4 (quick summarize of episode 30, based on episode 31)
- Mission 5 (episode 39.. mini game without battle at all)
- Mission 6 (episode 42)
- Mission 7 (episodes 43, 44 (final))

=== Uchū Keiji Tamashii Mode (extra) ===
- Opening
- Mission 1
- Mission 2
- Mission 3
- Mission 4A / Mission 4B
- Mission 5A / Mission 5B
- Staff Roll

=== Battle Royale Mode ===
In this Versus mode, the user selects one of the playable characters, within the heroes side, and fights against a CPU controller villain in a single-round deadly fight. Small variations are offered in this mode, like the ability to select an ally or, to fight versus either a single or a couple of enemies. The player has the ability to pick up and throw items in this game mode too.

- 1P vs CPU2
- 1P vs CPU2 + CPU3
- 1P + CPU1 vs CPU2
- 1P + CPU1 vs CPU2 + CPU3

=== Survival Mode (extra) ===
The player select one, of the five available characters, and have to defeat 999 villains, including bosses appearing in the Gavan Mode. CPU controlled allies from the two story modes will briefly join the fight and help the player. Exceptionally, this mode is a single-stage one, located on the parallel world, also no items can be used by the player. Beating this mode will unlock videos in the Omake Mode.

- Retsu Ichijoji (Gavan)
- Den Iga (Sharivan)
- Dai Sawamura (Shaider)
- Alan
- Annie

=== Omake Mode ===
This theater mode contains five unlockable original TV commercials broadcast in Japan in the '80s. An extra "Making of 宇宙刑事魂" 2006 footage is also selectable once unlocked.

- Gavan action figure 006P, Popy, TV commercial (unlockable)
- Dolgiran ship DX, Popy, TV commercial (unlockable)
- Sharivan action figure + Crime Burster gun, Bandai, TV commercial (unlockable)
- Sharingar Tank radio control, Characon/Bandai, TV commercial (unlockable)
- Shaian tank DX + Bluhawk bike, Popynika/Bandai, TV commercial (unlockable)
- Making of The Space Sheriff Spirits, behind the scenes featurette (unlockable)

=== Option ===
- Memory card (PS2): Load・Save
- Autosave function: Off・On
- Vibration function: Off・On
- Game difficulty: Easy・Normal・Hard
- Key assign type: Type A・Type B
- Music volume: Low<->High
- Sound effects volume: Low<->High
- Custom settings: Default・Custom

== Characters ==
=== Playable ===
- Gavan Mode
1. Retsu Ichijoji (Gavan)
2. Kojiro Aoyama
3. Alan
- Uchū Keiji Tamashii Mode
1. Retsu Ichijoji (Gavan)
2. Den Iga (Sharivan)
3. Dai Sawamura (Shaider)
4. Annie
- Battle Royale Mode
1. Retsu Ichijoji
2. Gavan
3. Vario Zector (unlockable)
4. Den Iga (unlockable)
5. Sharivan (unlockable)
6. Alan (unlockable)
7. Dai Sawamura (unlockable)
8. Shaider (unlockable)
9. Annie (unlockable)
- Survival Mode
1. Retsu Ichijoji (Gavan)
2. Den Iga (Sharivan)
3. Dai Sawamura (Shaider)
4. Alan
5. Annie

=== Non-playable ===
- Battle Royale Mode
1. Shako Monster
2. Double Man
3. Sai Doubler
4. Saber Doubler
5. Saimin Doubler (unlockable)
6. Buffalo Doubler (unlockable)
7. San Dorva (unlockable)
8. Kiba the Witch (unlockable)
9. Black Sai Doubler (unlockable)
10. Black Saber Doubler (unlockable)
11. Hunter Killer (unlockable)
12. Great Emperor Kubilai (unlockable)
13. Demon King Psycho (unlockable)
14. Don Horror (unlockable)
15. Dark Galaxy Queen (unlockable)
16. Commander Qom (unlockable)

== Voice cast ==
- Kenji Ohba - Retsu Ichijoji/Gavan
- Wakiko Kano - Mimi
- Hiroshi Watari - Den Iga/Sharivan
- Takuo Kawamura - Dai Sawamura/Shaider
- Naomi Morinaga - Annie
- Hiroshi Miyauchi - Alan/Space Sheriff Alan
- Toshiaki Nishizawa - Commander Kom
- Masayuki Suzuki - Kojiro Aoyama
- Shōzō Iizuka - Don Horror/Psycho/Kubhirai
- Michiro Iida - Hunter Killer/Vario Zector
- Noboru Mitani - Kiba the Witch/Majou Kiba
- Ken Nishida - Sun Dolba
- Machiko Soga - Dark Galaxy Queen/Honey/Mitsubachi Doubler (Double Girl)

== Production ==
An OST was released by Nippon Colombia for 3,300 Yen on June 21, 2006.

== Reception ==
Weekly Famitsu rated it 21/40.
