= Battle Fever J =

Japanese live-action tokusatsu TV series

- Title screen
- Genre: Tokusatsu; Superhero fiction Science fiction
- Created by: Toei Company; Marvel Comics
- Developed by: Susumu Takaku; Shozo Uehara
- Directed by: Koichi Takemoto; Itaru Orita; Minoru Yamada
- Starring: Hironori Tanioka; Yukio Itou; Narimitsu Kurachi; Kenji Ohba; Diane Martin; Naomi Hagi; Daisuke Ban; Chiyonosuke Azuma; Noriko Hidaka; Masashi Ishibashi; Maki Ueda
- Narrated by: Toru Ohira
- Composer: Michiaki Watanabe
- Country of origin: Japan
- No. of episodes: 52 (list of episodes)

Production
- Producers: Tetsuo Kanno; Kanetake Ochiai; Itaru Orita; Susumu Yoshikawa
- Running time: 30 minutes
- Production companies: Toei Company; Marvel Comics; TV Asahi

Original release
- Network: ANN (TV Asahi)
- Release: February 3, 1979 – January 26, 1980

Related
- J.A.K.Q. Dengekitai; Denshi Sentai Denjiman

Battle Fever J (バトルフィーバーJ(ジェー), Batoru Fībā Jei) is a Japanese television tokusatsu series broadcast by TV Asahi. The series is the third installment of Super Sentai. Directed by Koichi Takemoto, Itaru Orita and Minoru Yamada, it stars Hironori Tanioka, Yukio Itou, Narimitsu Kurachi, Kenji Ohba, Diane Martin, Naomi Hagi, Daisuke Ban, Chiyonosuke Azuma, Noriko Hidaka, Masashi Ishibashi and Maki Ueda. It aired from February 3, 1979, to January 26, 1980, replacing J.A.K.Q. Dengekitai and was replaced by Denshi Sentai Denjiman.

Battle Fever J was the first series to use the term Super Sentai (unlike the previous two who were just called Sentai, without the “Super”) until Toei announced in 1995 that its predecessors Himitsu Sentai Gorenger and J.A.K.Q. Dengekitai were also part of the Super Sentai series, when Chouriki Sentai Ohranger was announced as the 19th Super Sentai team.

== Plot ==
General Kurama assembles four young agents who had been dispatched around the world for training. They are joined by FBI investigator Diane Martin, whose father was murdered by Egos. The five don powered suits to become the Battle Fever Squad. The Battle Fever Squad's trump card is the Battle Fever Robo. Egos tries to stop the construction of the Robot, but the monsters they send to perform this task are defeated one by one by the Battle Fever Squad. Egos then unleashes the "younger brother" of the Buffalo Monster, a giant robot replica of its "older brother". The Robot, fortunately, is finished in time. Aboard it, the Battle Fever Squad defeats the Buffalo Monster and its successors. The Battle Fever Squad never stops, even when it lost two of its members (the original Miss America and Battle Cossack). With new members, the team defeats Hedder, now the Hedder Monster, and breaks into Egos' headquarters, where they are fed into the Egos Monster Making Machine so that they may be used as material for a Battle Fever Monster. The team destroys the machine and slays the mysterious deity Satan Egos himself with the Lightning Sword Rocketter sword-throwing move.

== Characters ==
=== Battle Fever Squad ===
The Battle Fever Squad (バトルフィーバー隊, Batoru Fībā Tai) is unique among Super Sentai shows in that, originally, they did not "transform" into their costumes (as in the previous two series, Gorenger and JAKQ), instead they resorted to an unseen costume change. In most episodes, however, the members yell "Fever!" and spin around to transform although in episode 24 it is revealed they can store their costumes in their Battle Ceiver (バトルシーバー, Batoru Shībā) bracelets.

- Masao Den (伝正夫, Den Masao) / Battle Japan (バトルジャパン, Batoru Japan): The red-colored warrior who received his combat training while in Japan. A former National Defense Ministry officer. He is good at judo and karate. He wields a spear. During the team's roll call, he performs a martial arts-inspired dance. 21 years after Battle Fever J ended, Battle Japan appeared as one of the 24 Red Rangers in Hyakujuu Sentai Gaoranger vs. Super Sentai, introduced by Choujyu Sentai Liveman Red Falcon to inspire the current team.
- (Soviet Union) Battle Cossack (バトルコサック, Batoru Kosakku): The orange-colored member of the Battle Fever Squad whose moniker was utilized by its original user and his successor. They dual wield a pair of sai. During the team's roll call, they perform a traditional Soviet dance.
  - Kensaku Shiraishi (白石謙作, Shiraishi Kensaku; 1–33): He was good at science as well as war. He was the original second in command of the team. In episode 33, he left the Big Baser without his Battle Cossack uniform and was fatally shot by a troop of Cutmen, attempting to save a little girl named Mayumi from Egos' forces. He loved to play Pachinko and enjoyed eating caviar.
  - Makoto Jin (神誠, Jin Makoto; 33–52): A silent cowboy. A man of action, not words. A scientist who trained in the Defense Ministry along with Kensaku. He joined Battle Fever to avenge the death of his friend. Makoto is an expert marksman. He is a loner, preferring to go off by himself. Makoto plays a trumpet to distract Egos.
- Kyousuke Shida (志田京介, Shida Kyōsuke) / Battle France (バトルフランス, Batoru Furansu): The blue-colored warrior who received his combat training while in France. He became the new second in command of the team after Kensaku's death. He is normally a beautician, a dandy and playboy. He enjoys eating escargot. He wields a rapier. During the team's roll call, he performs a flamenco dance.
- Shiro Akebono (曙四郎, Akebono Shirō) / Battle Kenya (バトルケニア, Batoru Kenia): The black-colored warrior who received his combat training while in Kenya. He is a wild child who can talk to animals. He wields a whip. During the team's roll call, he performs a tribal dance. He eats just about anything. The smell of his cooking is not appreciated by the other team members. Shiro later appeared in Kaizoku Sentai Gokaiger. He is also thematically similar to the Marvel superhero Black Panther.
- Miss America (ミスアメリカ, Misu Amerika): The pink-colored member of the Battle Fever Squad whose moniker was utilized by its original user and her successor. They wield unlimited throwing knives. During the team's roll call, they perform a disco dance.
  - Diane Martin (ダイアン・マーチン, Daian Māchin; 1–24): An FBI agent who joined the Battle Fever Squad to avenge her father Bosner, who was slain by Egos. In episode 24, after she was wounded by the Dracula Monster, she returned to the United States. Diane has a sister named Catherine (キャサリン, Kyasarin).
  - Maria Nagisa (汀マリア, Nagisa Maria; 24–52): An FBI agent trained by Bosner. When Diane was injured, Maria took her place as Miss America and then stayed on permanently when Diane decided to return to the United States.

=== Allies ===
- General Tetsuzan Kurama (倉間鉄山将軍, Kurama Tetsuzan Shōgun): The chief of the special science office of the National Defense Ministry who established the Battle Fever Squad. He is a master of traditional Japanese swordsmanship.
- Keiko Nakahara (中原ケイコ, Nakahara Keiko): One of the operatives that runs Big Baser.
- Tomoko Ueno (上野トモコ, Ueno Tomoko): The other operative that runs Big Baser.
- Masaru Nakahara (中原マサル, Nakahara Masaru): Keiko's little brother.
- Yuki Ueno (上野ユキ, Ueno Yuki): Tomoko's little sister. Was used by Egos in episode 27 to find Battle Fever's base.
- Kyutaro (九太郎, Kyūtarō): Robot mynah bird built by Tetsuzan as a present. Often had insight into the situation. Revealed in episode 51 to have a freezing ray built in.

=== Secret Society Egos ===
Secret Society Egos (秘密結社エゴス, Himitsu Kessha Egosu) is a religion of mad egocentrists who intend to plunge the world into chaos.

- Satan Egos (サタンエゴス, Satan Egosu): The mysterious head, entirely draped in black. He creates the Egos Monster's inside the Egos heart, calling them "My beloved Children". They call him "Father". He is ultimately slain by the Lightning Sword Rocketter.
- Commander Hedder (ヘッダー指揮官, Heddā Shikikan): The high priest of Egos. He later becomes the Hedder Monster after his death at the hands of Kurama and is slain a second time as such by the Battle Fever J's new attack, Battle Fever Power.
- Salomé (サロメ, Sarome): An Egos American branch officer who came to Japan to aid Hedder with her super strength. She is responsible for all the assassinations in America. She allowed herself to be captured by Battle Fever after attacking and replacing several policemen with disguised cutmen, with whom she stole a billion yen to give to Egos. She believes she is taken to the Battle Fever Base, but in reality she is taken to a warehouse. She carries a hand mirror with a tracker in it, which she uses to fire solar beams or to bludgeon people. She was killed in the collapsing castle as Satan Egos fled. Her last words were begging Egos to help her.
- Cutmen (カットマン, Kattoman): The foot soldiers in grey and black who wield MP40 machine guns.

==== Egos Monsters ====
The Egos Monsters (エゴス怪人, Egosu Kaijin) are the divine children of Egos created by the heart-like Egos Monster Making Machine. Anything from objects, animals, and willing humans can be turned into an Egos Monster this way. Many from episode 5 onward have "little brother" giant robot doubles that fight the Battle Fever Robot.

- Umbrella Monster (コウモリ怪人, Kōmori Kaijin): An umbrella-wielding bat-themed Egos Monster.
- Fang Lion Monster (キバジシ怪人, Kibajishi Kaijin): A lion-themed Egos Monster.
- Death Mask Monster (デスマスク怪人, Desu Masuku Kaijin): A death mask-themed Egos Monster.
- Psychokinesis Monster (ネンリキ怪人, Nenriki Kaijin): An Egos Monster created from a psychic named Bengal Tiger.
- Buffalo Monster (バッファロー怪人, Baffarō Kaijin): A water buffalo-themed Egos Monster.
- Doguu Monster (ドグウ怪人, Dogū Kaijin): A Dogū-themed Egos Monster.
- Fireball Monster (火の玉怪人, Hinotama Kaijin): An Egos Monster who wielded a fire-shooting trident.
- Sports Monster (スポーツ怪人, Supōtsu Kaijin): A hockey-themed Egos Monster.
- Icicle Monster (ツララ怪人, Tsurara Kaijin): An icicle-themed Egos Monster.
- Naumann Monster (ナウマン怪人, Nauman Kaijin): A Naumann's elephant-themed Egos Monster.
- Cobra Monster (コブラ怪人, Kobura Kaijin): A cobra-themed Egos Monster.
- Monster Roselinka (怪人バラリンカ, Kaijin Bararinka): A rose/human-themed Egos Monster.
- Egg Monster (タマゴ怪人, Tamago Kaijin): An egg-themed Egos Monster.
- Galaxy Monster (ギンガ怪人, Ginga Kaijin): A meteor/alien-themed Egos Monster.
- Snail Monster (カタツムリ怪人, Katatsumuri Kaijin): A snail-themed Egos Monster.
- Hand-to-Hand Combat Monster (格闘技怪人, Kakutōgi Kaijin): A wrestler-themed Egos Monster.
- Blue Vein Monster (青スジ怪人, Aosuji Kaijin): An Egos Monster.
- Magnet Monster (マグネット怪人, Magunetto Kaijin): A remora/magnet-themed Egos Monster.
- Notch Tooth Monster (ギザ歯怪人, Gizaba Kaijin): An alien-themed Egos Monster.
- Dinosaur Monster (恐竜怪人, Kyōryū Kaijin): A dinosaur-themed Egos Monster.
- Ghost Monster (ゴースト怪人, Gōsuto Kaijin): A ghost-themed Egos Monster.
- Dracula Monster (ドラキュラ怪人, Dorakyura Kaijin): A vampire bat-themed Egos Monster.
- Magic Monster (魔術怪人, Majutsu Kaijin): An owl/sorcerer-themed Egos Monster.
- Bandage Monster (ホウタイ怪人, Hōtai Kaijin): A bandaged pastor-themed Egos Monster.
- Black Mask Monster (黒仮面怪人, Kurokamen Kaijin): A black mask-wearing warrior-themed Egos Monster.
- Jellyfish Urchin Monster (クラゲウニモンスター, Kurageuni Kaijin): A jellyfish/sea urchin-themed Egos Monster.
- Kuchisake Monster (口裂け怪人, Kuchisake Kaijin): A Kuchisake-onna-themed Egos Monster.
- Picky Eating Monster (ヘンショク怪人, Henshoku Kaijin): A starfish-themed Egos Monster.
- Money Violence Monster (ゼニゲバ怪人, Zenigeba Kaijin): A coin purse-themed Egos Monster.
- Earthworm Monster (ミミズ怪人, Mimizu Kaijin): An earthworm-themed Egos Monster.
- Eagle Monster (イーグル怪人, Īguru Kaijin): An eagle-themed Egos Monster.
- Cicada Killer Monster (セミキラー怪人, Semikirā Kaijin): A cicada/loudspeaker-themed Egos Monster.
- Ancient Fish Monster (コダイギョ怪人, Kodaigyo Kaijin): A coelacanth-themed Egos Monster.
- Bomb Monster (バクダン怪人, Bakudan Kaijin): A grenade-themed Egos Monster.
- Four Faced Monster (四面怪人, Shimen Kaijin): An Asura-themed Egos Monster.
- Skull Mushroom Monster (ドクロキノコ怪人, Dokuro Kinoko Kaijin): A mushroom/skeleton-themed Egos Monster.
- Hyde Monster (ハイド怪人, Haido Kaijin): A snake-themed Egos Monster.
- Study Monster (ベンキョウ怪人, Benkyō Kaijin): A big-headed student-themed Egos Monster.
- Mechanical Doll Monster (カラクリ怪人, Karakuri Kaijin): A Karakuri puppet-themed Egos Monster.
- Electric Monster (デンキ怪人, Denki Kaijin): A power station-themed Egos Monster.
- Rolling Monster (ゴロンゴ怪人, Gorongo Kaijin): A rock-themed Egos Monster.
- Illusion Monster (ゲンソウ怪人, Genzō Kaijin): An illusion-casting moth-themed Egos Monster.
- Heart Monster (シンゾウ怪人, Shinzō Kaijin): A butterfly-mouthed heart-themed Egos Monster.
- Curse Monster (ノロイ怪人, Noroi Kaijin): A straw man-themed Egos Monster.
- Left Hand Monster (ヒダリテ怪人, Hidarite Kaijin): A hand-themed Egos Monster.
- Great Thief Monster (大盗賊怪人, Daitōzoku Kaijin): An Egos Monster.
- Fly Trap Monster (ハエジゴク怪人, Haejigoku Kaijin): A Venus flytrap/echinacea-themed Egos Monster.
- Ogre Beard Monster (オニヒゲ怪人, Onihige Kaijin): A root-themed Egos Monster.

== Episodes ==
No.	Title	Directed by	Written by	Original release date
1	"Assault!! Run to the Ballpark" "Totsugeki!! Kyūjō e Hashire" (Japanese: 突撃！！球場へ走れ)	Koichi Takemoto	Susumu Takaku	February 3, 1979
2	"Egos' Monster-Making Method" "Egosu Kaijin Seizō Hō" (Japanese: エゴス怪人製造法)	Koichi Takemoto	Shozo Uehara	February 10, 1979
3	"Search for the Spy!" "Supai o Sagase!" (Japanese: スパイを探せ！)	Itaru Orita	Susumu Takaku	February 17, 1979
4	"It's a Super-Powered Trap!" "Chōmaryoku no Wana da!" (Japanese: 超魔力の罠だ！)	Itaru Orita	Shozo Uehara	February 24, 1979
5	"Robot Big Dogfight" "Robotto Dai Kūchūsen" (Japanese: ロボット大空中戦)	Koichi Takemoto	Susumu Takaku	March 3, 1979
6	"Launch the Multipurpose Battleship" "Bannō Senkan Hasshin Seyo" (Japanese: 万能戦艦発進せよ)	Koichi Takemoto	Shozo Uehara	March 10, 1979
7	"The House Burns!!" "O-uchi ga Moeru!!" (Japanese: お家が燃える！！)	Itaru Orita	Susumu Takaku	March 17, 1979
8	"The Riddle of the Strongarm Ace" "Tetsuwan Ēsu no Nazo" (Japanese: 鉄腕エースの謎)	Itaru Orita	Shozo Uehara	March 24, 1979
9	"The Woman from the Land of Ice" "Kōri no Kuni no Onna" (Japanese: 氷の国の女)	Koichi Takemoto	Susumu Takaku	March 31, 1979
10	"I Saw the Naumann Elephant" "Nauman-zō o Mita" (Japanese: ナウマン象を見た)	Koichi Takemoto	Shozo Uehara	April 7, 1979
11	"The Great Case of the Pet Kidnapping" "Petto Yūkai Dai Jiken" (Japanese: ペット誘拐大事件)	Itaru Orita	Susumu Takaku	April 14, 1979
12	"The Cursed Killing Method, Rose Snowstorm" "Noroi Sappō Bara Fubuki" (Japanese: 呪い殺法バラ吹雪)	Itaru Orita	Takashi Ezure	April 21, 1979
13	"Golden Eggs and Sunny-Side-Up Eggs" "Kin no Tamago to Medamayaki" (Japanese: 金の卵と目玉焼き)	Minoru Yamada	Shozo Uehara	April 28, 1979
14	"Marriage of the Beauty and the Beast" "Bijo to Yajū no Kekkon" (Japanese: 美女と野獣の結婚)	Minoru Yamada	Shozo Uehara	May 5, 1979
15	"Egos' Hellish Cooking" "Egosu no Jigoku Ryōri" (Japanese: エゴスの地獄料理)	Koichi Takemoto	Susumu Takaku	May 12, 1979
16	"The Tragedy of the Unarmed-Combat Queen" "Kakutōgi Joō no Higeki" (Japanese: 格闘技女王の悲劇)	Koichi Takemoto	Takashi Ezure	May 19, 1979
17	"Steal the Monster Machine" "Monsutā Mashin o Ubae" (Japanese: 怪物(モンスター)マシンを奪え)	Itaru Orita	Shozo Uehara	May 26, 1979
18	"Hurry to the Dove's Nest of Evil" "Hato yo Aku no Su e Isoge" (Japanese: 鳩よ悪の巣へ急げ)	Itaru Orita	Shozo Uehara	June 2, 1979
19	"The World's Strongest Beauty!!" "Sekai Saikyō no Bijo" (Japanese: 世界最強の美女！！)	Koichi Takemoto	Susumu Takaku	June 9, 1979
20	"Hazardous Ghost Hunting" "Kiken na Yūrei Kari" (Japanese: 危険な幽霊狩り)	Koichi Takemoto	Hirohisa Soda	June 16, 1979
21	"Assault the Dinosaur Peninsula!!" "Kyōryū Hantō e Totsugeki" (Japanese: 恐竜半島へ突撃！！)	Minoru Yamada	Shozo Uehara	June 23, 1979
22	"The Female Spy Team's Counterattack" "Onna Supai Dan no Gyakushū" (Japanese: 女スパイ団の逆襲)	Minoru Yamada	Shozo Uehara	June 30, 1979
23	"Decisive Battle!! All Monsters Appear" "Kessen!! Kaijin Sō Tōjō" (Japanese: 決戦！！怪人総登場)	Koichi Takemoto	Susumu Takaku	July 7, 1979
24	"Tears! Diane Falls" "Namida! Daian Taoru" (Japanese: 涙！ダイアン倒る)	Koichi Takemoto	Susumu Takaku	July 14, 1979
25	"The Film Studio is a Strange Haunt" "Satsueijo wa Kaiki Makyō" (Japanese: 撮影所は怪奇魔境)	Koichi Takemoto	Shozo Uehara	July 21, 1979
26	"The Bandage Man's Masked Report" "Hōtai Otoko no Kamen Hōkoku" (Japanese: 包帯男の仮面報告)	Itaru Orita	Hirohisa Soda	July 28, 1979
27	"Beware of First Love Thief" "Hatsukoi Dorobō ni Goyōjin" (Japanese: 初恋泥棒にご用心)	Itaru Orita	Shozo Uehara	August 4, 1979
28	"Chase the Mysterious Boat" "Nazo no Bōto o Oe" (Japanese: 謎のボートを追え)	Koichi Takemoto	Shozo Uehara	August 11, 1979
29	"Did You See Her!? The Woman With the Torn Mouth" "Mita ka!? Kuchisake Onna" (Japanese: 見たか！？口裂け女)	Koichi Takemoto	Takashi Ezure	August 18, 1979
30	"The Bizarre Taste, Omnivorous Head Chef" "Akujiki Zasshoku no Ryōrichō" (Japanese: 悪食雑食の料理長)	Minoru Yamada	Hirohisa Soda	August 25, 1979
31	"Violent Dash Truck Siblings" "Gekisō Torakku Kyōdai" (Japanese: 激走トラック兄妹)	Minoru Yamada	Hirohisa Soda	September 1, 1979
32	"Hometown Homicide Village" "Furusato Satsujin Mura" (Japanese: ふるさと殺人村)	Koichi Takemoto	Shozo Uehara	September 8, 1979
33	"Cossack Dies in Love" "Kosakku Ai ni Shisu" (Japanese: コサック愛に死す)	Koichi Takemoto	Shozo Uehara	September 15, 1979
34	"The Dark Shogun Who Laughs in Hell" "Jigoku de Warau Yami Shōgun" (Japanese: 地獄で笑う闇将軍)	Itaru Orita	Shozo Uehara	September 22, 1979
35	"Starving Big Panic" "Harapeko Dai Panikku" (Japanese: 腹ペコ大パニック)	Itaru Orita	Shozo Uehara	September 29, 1979
36	"The Blown-Up Wedding" "Bakuhasareta Kekkonshiki" (Japanese: 爆破された結婚式)	Kimio Hirayama	Shozo Uehara	October 6, 1979
37	"Lightning Sword vs. Pinwheel Sword" "Denkōken Tai Fūshaken" (Japanese: 電光剣対風車剣)	Kimio Hirayama	Hirohisa Soda	October 13, 1979
38	"The Bizarre Party's Trap" "Kaiki Pātī no Wana" (Japanese: 怪奇パーティーの罠)	Koichi Takemoto	Shozo Uehara	October 20, 1979
39	"The Friend Who Became a Demon" "Akuma ni Natta Tomo" (Japanese: 悪魔になった友)	Koichi Takemoto	Shozo Uehara	October 27, 1979
40	"The Beautiful Teacher, in the Nick of Time" "Bijin Sensei Kikiippatsu" (Japanese: 美人先生危機一髪)	Koichi Takemoto	Takashi Ezure	November 3, 1979
41	"A Big Come-from-behind on the Verge of Explosion" "Bakuha Sunzen no Dai Gyakuten" (Japanese: 爆破寸前の大逆転)	Itaru Orita	Takashi Ezure	November 10, 1979
42	"The Spark of Electric Human Love" "Denki Ningen Ai no Hibana" (Japanese: 電気人間愛の火花)	Itaru Orita	Shozo Uehara	November 17, 1979
43	"Assassin Jackal" "Ansatsusha Jakkaru" (Japanese: 暗殺者ジャッカル)	Koichi Takemoto	Susumu Takaku	November 24, 1979
44	"The Tsukikage Clan of Hell Valley" "Jigoku-dani no Tsukikage Ichizoku" (Japanese: 地獄谷の月影一族)	Koichi Takemoto	Takashi Ezure	December 1, 1979
45	"Five Minutes Before the Heart Stops!" "Shinzō Teishi Gofun Mae" (Japanese: 心臓停止五分前！)	Koichi Takemoto	Takashi Ezure	December 8, 1979
46	"The Cursed Straw Doll" "Noroi no Wara Ningyō" (Japanese: 呪いのワラ人形)	Itaru Orita	Shozo Uehara	December 15, 1979
47	"A Mystery! Strategic Grass-Lot Baseball" "Kai! Bōryaku no Kusayakyū" (Japanese: 怪！謀略の草野球)	Itaru Orita	Hirohisa Soda	December 22, 1979
48	"The Big Thief and the Robber Boy" "Dai Tōzoku to Dorobō Shōnen" (Japanese: 大盗賊と泥棒少年)	Kimio Hirayama	Susumu Takaku	December 29, 1979
49	"The Five Second Graders Rebel Army" "Ninen Gokumi no Hanrangun" (Japanese: 2年5組の反乱軍)	Kimio Hirayama	Shozo Uehara	January 5, 1980
50	"The Demon Who Aims at the Shogun's Mask" "Shōgun o Nerau Fukumen-ki" (Japanese: 将軍を狙う覆面鬼)	Kimio Hirayama	Shozo Uehara	January 12, 1980
51	"Egos' Revival Ceremony" "Egosu Fukkatsu no Kishiki" (Japanese: エゴス復活の儀式)	Itaru Orita	Shozo Uehara	January 19, 1980
52 (Final)	"The Symphony of the Heroes" "Eiyūtachi no Shinfonī" (Japanese: 英雄たちの交響曲(シンフォニー))	Itaru Orita	Shozo Uehara	January 26, 1980

== Movie ==
There was a theatrical release of Battle Fever J, released as part of the Toei Manga Matsuri on July 29, 1979. It was a blown up version of Episode 5 "Robot Big Dogfight". This theatrical version did not appear on Toei's Super Sentai Movie compilation DVD's, but was included in Toei's Tokusatsu Hero The Movie DVD series, featured on Volume 5 of the collection.

== Cast ==
- Masao Den: Hironori Tanioka (谷岡弘規, Tanioka Hironori)
- Kensaku Shiraishi: Yukio Itou (伊藤武史, Itō Yuiko)
- Makoto Jin: Naoya Ban (伴直弥, Ban Naoya)
- Kyosuke Shida: Yuuhei Kurachi (倉地雄平, Kurachi Yūhei)
- Shiro Akebono: Kenji Ohba (大葉健二, Ōba Kenji)
- Diane Martin: Diane Martin (ダイアン・マーチン, Daian Māchin)
  - Diane Martin (voice): Lisa Komaki (小牧リサ, Komaki Risa) (1–14, 17–24) / Keiko Yokozawa (横沢啓子, Yokozawa Keiko) (15–16)
- Maria Nagisa: Naomi Hagi (萩奈穂美, Hagi Naomi)
- General Tetsuzan Kurama: Chiyonosuke Azuma (東千代之介, Azuma Chiyonosuke)
- Keiko Nakahara: Noriko Itō (伊東範子, Itō Noriko)
- Masaru Nakahara: Takumi Satō (佐藤たくみ, Satō Takumi)
- Tomoko Ueno: Keiko Kanno (菅野啓子, Kanno Keiko)
- Yuki Ueno: Michiyo Satō (佐藤三千代, Satō Michiyo)
- Akio Hamamura: Shin'ichi Yoshimiya (吉宮慎一, Yoshimiya Shin'ichi)
- Shigeo Aoki: Seiji Suzuki (鈴木誠司, Suzuki Seiji)
- Kyutaro (voice): Hisako Kyōda (京田尚子, Kyōda Hisako)
- Commander Hedder: Kenji Ushio (潮建志, Ushio Kenji) (1, 3, 5, 7 (Note: Original version only. Subsequent airings and releases have replaced Kenji Ushio by Masashi Ishibashi, except for episodes 4 and 6.)) / Masashi Ishibashi (石橋雅史, Ishibashi Masashi) (4, 6, 8–51)
- Salome: Maki Ueda (マキ上田, Maki Ueda)
- Satan Egos (voice): Shōzō Iizuka (飯塚昭三, Īzuka Shōzō)
- Narrator: Tōru Ōhira (大平 透, Ōhira Tōru)

=== Guest stars ===
- Boiser Martin (Diane's father) (1, 24): David Friedman
- Fake Diane Martin (Umbrella Monster's Human Form) (1)/Ayoko Ichijoji (52): Eri Kanuma
- Hikaru Amano (2): Maki Tachibana
- Miyoko Akiyama (2): Sumiko Kakizaki
- Hidemi (2): Ako Kami
- Editor In Chief Azuma / Death Mask Monster (3): Machiko Soga
- Member Of Scientific Journal (3): Kenzo Arai
- Bengal Tiger / Psychocinesis Monster (4): Masashi Ishibashi
- Sambo Segawa (4): Teiji Omiwa
- Sagaguchi Family (5)
  - Director Sakaguchi: Nobuyuki Katsube
  - Yoko Sakaguchi: Yukiko Ebina
  - Kenichi Sakaguci: Yoichi Hirose
- Ken (6): Seiichi Ando
- Hideo Toyota (7): Minoru Takeuchi
- Nurse (7): Ritsuko Fujiyama
- Fireman (7): Satoshi Kurihara
- Policeman (7): Toshimichi Takahashi
- Dr. Yoneyama (8): Yoshikazu Sugi
- Koji Matsui (8): Kazuhito Ando
- Katayama Family (9)
  - Shinichiro Katayama: Shun Domon
  - Mitsuko Katayama: Junko Mihara
- Master Of Dealer Gun (9): Koji Sekiyama
- Teacher Moriyama (10): Kei Sunaga
- Teacher (11): Junko Asashina
- Xinyi Fukuda (11): Nobuyoshi Fukuda
- Junko Nogata / Rosalinka Monster (12): Mariko Jun
- Suzumoto Family (13)
  - Yuzo Suzumoto: Masaya Taki
  - Yaeko Suzumoto: Ai Komachi
  - Yuichi Suzumoto: Masami Zaizen
  - Yuichi's Sister: Tsuneko Kikuchi
- Rumi (13): Akemi Watanabe
- Yohei Oyama (14): Hiroshi Kusajiki
- Mizusawa Family (14)
  - Kumiko Mizusawa: Rika Miura
  - Miyoko Mizusawa: Michiyo Sato
- Cuttman (14): Hiro Kawarazaki
- Catherine (15): Tomomi Umeda
- Raita (15): Mirai Takeshi Sekiguchi
- Black Tiger Mari (16): Mitchi Love
- Mitsuru Okiyama (16): Naoya Uchida
- Black Snake (16): Jaguar Yokota (as Rimi Yokota)
- Hand-to-Hand Combat Monster: Kim Oomae
- Torishima Family (17)
  - Daisuke Torishima/Dr. Taichi Torishima: Akira Oizumi
- Kuroda (17): Eiji Karasawa
- Racing Driver (17): Yojiro Terada
- Iwamoto Family (18)
  - Director Iwamoto: Takashi Tabata
  - Kazuki Iwamoto: Hajime Nakamura
  - Grandmother Iwamoto: Toyoko Takechi
- Ryoko (20): Sayoko Tanimoto
- Spy Women's (21–22)
  - Zero One: Yukie Kagawa
  - Zero Two: Rie Mikawa
- Arishima Family (21–22)
  - Senzo Arishima: Genji Kawai
  - Shinobu Arishima: Kaoru Asakawa
- Old Woman (24): Keiko Orihara
- Catherine Martin (24): Louise Phillipe
- Sayuri Kurihara (25): Lisa Komaki
- Director (25): Gozo Soma
- Charmain Yumeno (25): Takeshi Yamamoto
- Yoshio Murano (32): Kenichi Endō
- Professor Mimura (33): Shiro Ooki
- Mayumi Mimura (33): Mika Matsushita
- Akira Jin (34): Toshiaki Kamohara
- Car Owner (34): Kin'ya Sugi
- Doutor Sekine/Hyde Monster (39): Shinji Todo
- Tsuyoshi Takeuchi (The Jackal) (43): Ryo Tomota
- Eye's Man (1944): Shinzo Tanabe
- Monshiro Ocho / Illusion Monster (44): Sumie Sakai

== Songs ==
Opening theme

- "Battle Fever J" (バトルフィーバーJ, Batoru Fībā Jei)
  - Lyrics: Keisuke Yamakawa (山川 啓介, Yamakawa Keisuke)
  - Composition and Arrangement: Michiaki Watanabe (渡辺 宙明, Watanabe Michiaki)
  - Artist: MoJo with the Columbia Yurikago-Kai
- "Battle Fever J (Alternate Opening)"
  - Lyrics: Keisuke Yamakawa
  - Composition and Arrangement: Michiaki Watanabe
  - Artist: MoJo, Columbia Yurikago-Kai, Feeling Free

Ending theme

- "Yūsha ga Yuku" (勇者が行く; "Brave Men Go")
  - Lyrics: Saburō Yatsude
  - Composition and Arrangement: Michiaki Watanabe
  - Artist: MoJo

== International broadcast and home video ==
- In its home country of Japan, only Episode 8 was released on VHS by Toei Video. From June 21, 1999 to June 21, 2000, it was then released for the first time as a full series release on Laserdisc and spread through several volumes. Each volume contains two discs with eight episodes, with Volume 7 only having 1 disc with four episodes. From February 21, 2007 to June 21, 2007, it was given a DVD release for the first time. But it did go out of print for a while until September 21, 2012, when production resumed with the completion of all Super Sentai DVDs. Each volume contains 11 episodes (Volume 4 contains 10 episodes and Volume 5 contains 9 episodes).
- In the Philippines, this series was aired on City2 from 1982 to 1983.
- The series aired in the United States in the state of Hawaii where Battle Fever J got very popular. That along with Himitsu Sentai Gorenger, Android Kikaider, Kamen Rider V3, Warrior of Love Rainbowman and many others, all of which were shown in the original Japanese dialogue with English subtitles provided by JN Productions on then KIKU Channel 13.
- The show was also broadcast in Thailand late in the mid-1990s with the title Ranger J on MCOT Channel 9 with a Thai dub.
