= Kenji Ohba =

Japanese actor and stuntman (1955–2026)

- 大葉 健二
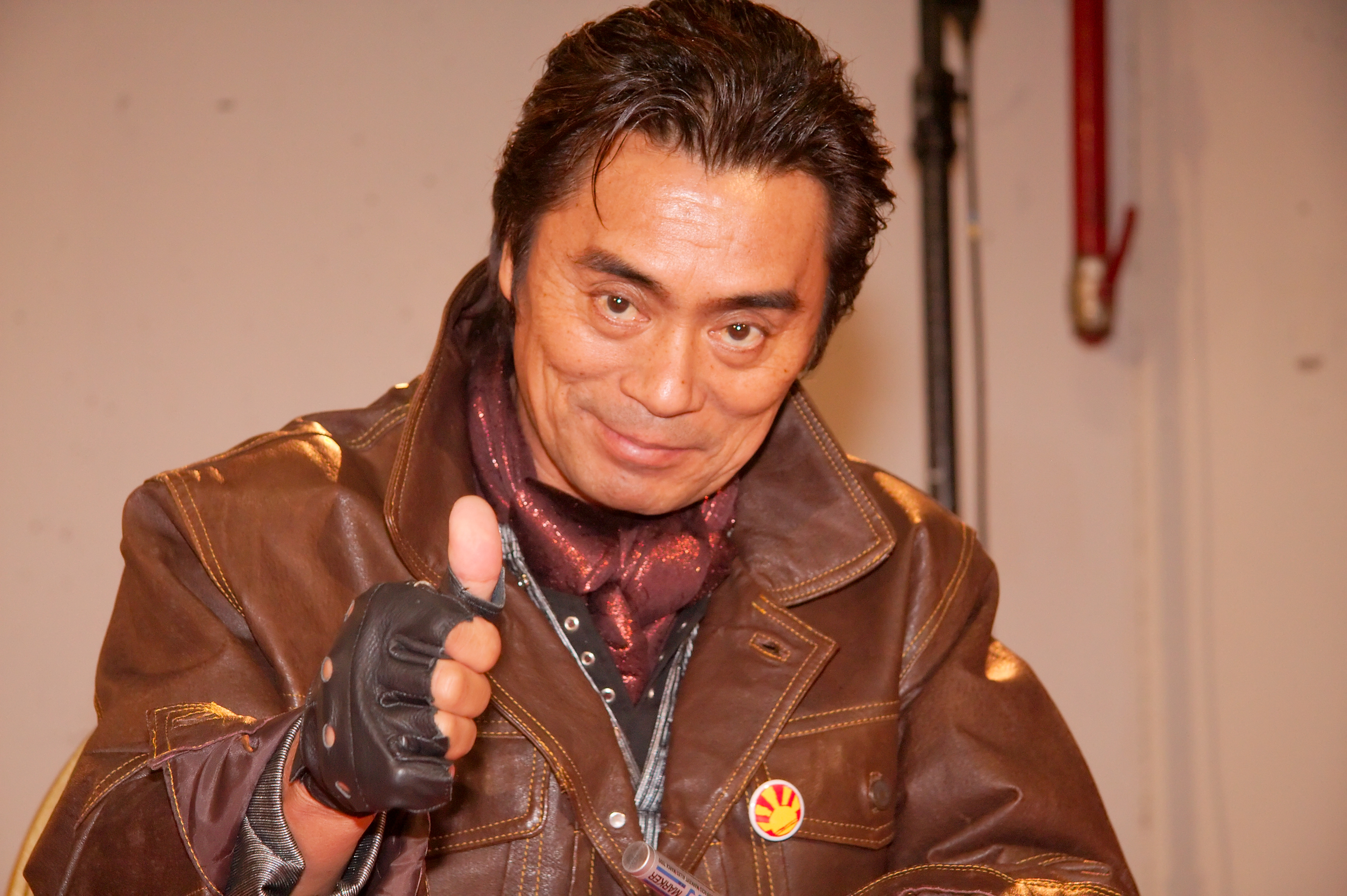
- Ohba in 2008
- Born: Kenji Takahashi; February 5, 1955; Matsuyama, Ehime Prefecture, Japan
- Died: May 6, 2026 (aged 71)
- Occupations: Actor, stunt
- Years active: 1972–2026
- Children: 1

Kenji Takahashi (高橋 健二, Takahashi Kenji; February 5, 1955 – May 6, 2026), known professionally as Kenji Ohba (大葉 健二, Ōba Kenji) was a Japanese actor and stuntman best known for his roles in the Super Sentai and Metal Heroes series, especially as Retsu Ichijouji/Gavan in the 1982 television series Space Sheriff Gavan.

== Life and career ==
Ohba was born as Kenji Takahashi in Matsuyama, Ehime Prefecture, Japan, on February 5, 1955.

He also played Shiro Akebono/Battle Kenya in Battle Fever J and Daigoro Oume/DenziBlue in Denshi Sentai Denziman. Ohba was the president of his own action/stunt troupe called "Luck JET" ("JET" being an acronym for "Jaunty Eventful Troupe").

In May 2018, Ohba was reportedly hospitalized after he fainted at his house. He subsequently recovered from the incident.

Ohba died following a long illness on May 6, 2026, at the age of 71. His death was announced the following day. A funeral was held privately with his family only in attendance.

=== Personal life ===
Ohba's daughter, Nao Wakaba, is an actress.

== Filmography ==
=== Film ===
- Sister Street Fighter (1974) – Combatant #1
- Akane iro no kûdô (1976)
- Dasso yugi (1976)
- Golgo 13: Assignment Kowloon (1977) – Karate Brother 1
- J.A.K.Q. Dengekitai vs. Gorenger (1978, Suit actor)
- Denshi Sentai Denziman Movie (1980) – Daigoro Oume / Denzi Blue
- Legend of the Eight Samurai (1983) – Inukai Genpachi Nobufuchi
- Kotaro makari-toru! (1984) – Teruhiko Tenkouji
- Space Cop Shaider: Pursuit! Shigi Shigi Abduction Plan (1984) – Retsu Ichijôji / Space Sheriff Gavan
- Shogun's Samurai (1985) – Gamahachi
- Kamen Rider ZO (1993) – Kuroda
- Battle Royale II: Requiem (2003) – Maki's father
- Kill Bill Volume 1 (2003) – Shiro, Bald Guy
- Kill Bill: Volume 2 (2004) – Shiro, Bald Guy
- Kill Bill: The Whole Bloody Affair (2004) – Shiro, Bald Guy
- Sekiryû no onna (2006)
- Gokaiger Goseiger Super Sentai 199 Hero Great Battle (2011) – Daigoro Oume
- Kaizoku Sentai Gokaiger vs. Space Sheriff Gavan: The Movie (2012) – Retsu Ichijouji / Gavan, Shiro Akebono / Battle Kenya, Daigoro Oume / Denzi Blue
- Space Sheriff Gavan: The Movie (2012) – Retsu Ichijouji / Gavan
- Super Hero Taisen Z (2013) – Commander Retsu Ichijouji/Gavan
- Dragon Emperor (2016)
- Space Squad: Gavan vs. Dekaranger (2017) – Retsu Ichijouji / Gavan
- HE-LOW (2018)

=== Television ===
- Android Kikaider (1972, Jiro's suit actor)
- Kikaider 01 (1973, Jiro's suit actor)
- Robot Detective (1973)
- Symbol of Justice Condorman (1975)
- Akumaizer 3 (1975, Suit actor)
- Himitsu Sentai Gorenger (1975) – Akarenger suit actor
- Choujin Bibyun (1976)
- J.A.K.Q. Dengekitai (1977) – Hayato Kono (episode 3)
- Message from Space: Galactic Wars (1978)
- Battle Fever J (1979) – Shiro Akebono / Battle Kenya
- Denshi Sentai Denjiman (1980) – Daigoro Oume / Denji Blue
- Space Sheriff Gavan (1982) – Retsu Ichijouji / Gavan
- Space Sheriff Sharivan (1983) – Retsu Ichijouji / Gavan (episode 1-6, 13-24, 34, 48 & 51)
- Space Sheriff Shaider (1984) – Retsu Ichijouji / Gavan (episode 49)
- Kage no Gundan IV (1985) – Gamahachi
- Choujinki Metalder (1987) – (episodes 25 & 26)
- Hissatsu Shigotonin V Fuunryūkohen (1987) (episode 13)
- Sekai Ninja Sen Jiraiya (1988) – Yajiro (episode 27)
- Kamen Rider Black RX (1989) – Masaru Kujo (episode 34)
- Ninpuu Sentai Hurricaneger (2002) – Shurikenger disguise (episode 45)
- Juken Sentai Gekiranger (2007) – Dan Kenshi (episodes 40 and 42)
- Kaizoku Sentai Gokaiger (2011) – Shiro Akebono (episode 44)

=== Video games ===
- The Space Sheriff Spirits (2006) – Retsu Ichijouji/Gavan (voice)

=== Stage ===
- Tiger & Bunny the Live (2012) – "Hero Academy Teacher"
