= Koorogi '73 =

Japanese backing vocals group, 1972–1990

- Origin: Japan
- Genres: J-pop
- Years active: 1972–1990
- Past members: Seitake Okura; Hiroki Ueno; Takafumi Tsushima; Masaki Sato; Tatsuya Kishi; Takayuki Maki

Koorogi '73 (こおろぎ'73, Kōrogi Nanajū-san) were a Japanese backing vocals group best known for their contributions to the Super Robot series and Toei's Super Sentai and Kamen Rider Series. The group was disbanded after 1990.

The Japanese word kōrogi (こおろぎ) means "a cricket."
