= Tokumei Sentai Go-Busters vs. Kaizoku Sentai Gokaiger: The Movie =

- Theatrical poster for Tokumei Sentai Go-Busters vs. Kaizoku Sentai Gokaiger: The Movie

Japanese name
- Kanji: 特命戦隊ゴーバスターズVS海賊戦隊ゴーカイジャー THE MOVIE
Transcriptions
- Revised Hepburn: Tokumei Sentai Gōbasutāzu Tai Kaizoku Sentai Gōkaijā Za Mūbī
- Directed by: Takayuki Shibasaki
- Written by: Kento Shimoyama
- Starring: Katsuhiro Suzuki; Ryouma Baba; Arisa Komiya; Hiroya Matsumoto; Ryota Ozawa; Yuki Yamada; Mao Ichimichi; Kazuki Shimizu; Yui Koike; Junya Ikeda
- Distributed by: Toei Company
- Release date: January 19, 2013
- Running time: 61 minutes.
- Country: Japan
- Language: Japanese
- Box office: $4.4 million

Tokumei Sentai Go-Busters vs. Kaizoku Sentai Gokaiger: The Movie (特命戦隊ゴーバスターズVS海賊戦隊ゴーカイジャー THE MOVIE, Tokumei Sentai Gōbasutāzu Tai Kaizoku Sentai Gōkaijā Za Mūbī) is an entry in the Super Sentai VS film series, which features the meeting of casts and characters of Tokumei Sentai Go-Busters and Kaizoku Sentai Gokaiger. The film was released on January 19, 2013 and features the first appearance of the main cast of Zyuden Sentai Kyoryuger.

== Plot ==
As the Buddyloids question their Go-Buster partners' dependence on them, they are alerted to the presence of the Zangyack Empire's new emperor Bacchus Gil and the Gokaigers. In the ensuing fight, a confused Gai Ikari arrives to help the Gokaigers while Vaglass member Enter attempts to escape with the Phantom Ranger Keys. However, the keys' unstable power opens a time vortex that pulls in most of the keys, the Gokaigers, Yoko Usami, Gorisaki, and Beet J. Stag. Soon after, the Gokaigers' ally Navi arrives, revealing the last time she saw her crewmates was during a failed assault on the Zangyack homeworld before they seemingly joined forces with Bacchus and Vaglass. Additionally, the Phantom Ranger Keys grant their owner unlimited power.

While regrouping, the remaining Go-Busters, Buddlyloids, and Navi are visited by Shinkenger member Kaoru Shiba, who brings them a message from Yoko saying she, Jay, and Ikari ended up in 18th century Japan. Upon learning further that the other Gokaigers ended up throughout 16th century Europe and Gorisaki is in Laurasia, the Go-Busters borrow Ikari's mecha GouZyu Drill to travel through time, rescue everyone, and retrieve the Phantom Ranger Keys. In the process, the Go-Busters learn the Gokaigers pretended to join the Zangyack Empire so they could take the Phantom Ranger Keys. However, Bacchus realizes their deception and steals two of the Keys upon their return to the present while Enter damages the Go-Busters' mecha. After the Buddyloids sacrifice their personality programming to provide the necessary repairs, the Go-Busters resolve to fight on in their stead and join forces with the Gokaigers to fight the combined Zangyack and Vaglass forces and retrieve all of the Phantom Ranger Keys. Along the way, the two teams receive help from the Kyoryugers, allowing the Go-Busters and Gokaigers to foil Bacchus and Enter's plot to trap Earth in Hyper Space.

Bacchus enlarges while Enter summons his own mecha to fight the two teams. Despite overpowering them, the Go-Busters' refusal to give up on the Buddyloids miraculously restores their personalities and turns the Phantom Ranger Keys into Megazord Keys. Using them, the Gokaigers and Go-Busters transform their mecha into those of their Super Sentai predecessors' to kill Bacchus and defeat Enter. As the Gokaigers bid farewell and head off to find another treasure, their leader Captain Marvelous gives the Go-Busters his blessing as a Sentai team while the Buddyloids get into an argument with their partners over what happened following their sacrifice.

== Cast ==
- Hiromu Sakurada/Red Buster: Katsuhiro Suzuki (鈴木 勝大, Suzuki Katsuhiro)
- Ryuji Iwasaki/Blue Buster: Ryouma Baba (馬場 良馬, Baba Ryōma)
- Yoko Usami/Yellow Buster: Arisa Komiya (小宮 有紗, Komiya Arisa)
- Cheeda Nick: Keiji Fujiwara (藤原 啓治, Fujiwara Keiji; Voice)
- Gorisaki Banana: Tesshō Genda (玄田 哲章, Genda Tesshō; Voice)
- Usada Lettuce: Tatsuhisa Suzuki (鈴木 達央, Suzuki Tatsuhisa; Voice)
- Masato Jin/Beet Buster: Hiroya Matsumoto (松本 寛也, Matsumoto Hiroya)
- Beet J. Stag/Stag Buster, Waredonaier: Yuichi Nakamura (中村 悠一, Nakamura Yūichi; Voice)
- Captain Marvelous/Gokai Red: Ryota Ozawa (小澤 亮太, Ozawa Ryōta)
- Joe Gibken/Gokai Blue: Yuki Yamada (山田 裕貴, Yamada Yūki)
- Luka Millfy/Gokai Yellow: Mao Ichimichi (市道 真央, Ichimichi Mao)
- Don "Doc" Dogoier/Gokai Green: Kazuki Shimizu (清水 一希, Shimizu Kazuki)
- Ahim de Famille/Gokai Pink: Yui Koike (小池 唯, Koike Yui)
- Gai Ikari/Gokai Silver: Junya Ikeda (池田 純矢, Ikeda Jun'ya)
- Navi: Yukari Tamura (田村 ゆかり, Tamura Yukari; Voice)
- Takeshi Kuroki: Hideo Sakaki (榊 英雄, Sakaki Hideo)
- Toru Morishita: Naoto Takahashi (高橋 直人, Takahashi Naoto)
- Miho Nakamura: Fuuka Nishihira (西平 風香, Nishihira Fūka)
- Kaoru Shiba: Runa Natsui (夏居 瑠奈, Natsui Runa)
- Jerashid: Takahiro Sakurai (櫻井 孝宏, Sakurai Takahiro; Voice)
- Enter: Syo Jinnai (陳内 将, Jinnai Shō)
- Escape: Ayame Misaki (水崎 綾女, Misaki Ayame)
- Basco Ta Jolokia: Kei Hosogai (細貝 圭, Hosogai Kei)
- Bacchus Gill: Takaya Hashi (土師 孝也, Hashi Takaya; Voice)
- Kyoryu Red (Daigo Kiryu): Ryo Ryusei (竜星 涼, Ryūsei Ryō; Voice)
- Kyoryu Black (Ian Yorkland): Syuusuke Saito (斉藤 秀翼, Saitō Shūsuke; Voice)
- Kyoryu Blue (Nobuharu Udo): Yamato Kinjo (金城 大和, Kinjō Yamato; Voice)
- Kyoryu Green (Souji Rippukan): Akihisa Shiono (塩野 瑛久, Shiono Akihisa; Voice)
- Kyoryu Pink (Amy Yuuzuki): Ayuri Konno (今野 鮎莉, Konno Ayuri; Voice)
- Automatic Program Voice: Kanako Seno (瀬乃 加奈子, Seno Kanako)
- Mobilate Voice, Gokai Sabre Voice, Gokai Gun Voice, Gokai Cellular Voice, Gokai Spear Voice, Gokai Galleon Buster Voice: Tomokazu Seki (関 智一, Seki Tomokazu)
- Narration, Go-Busters Equipment Voice: Shoo Munakata (宗方 脩, Munakata Shū)
- GB Custom Visor Voice, Lio Blaster Voice: Ichirou Mizuki (水木 一郎, Mizuki Ichirou)
- Gaburevolver Voice: Shigeru Chiba (千葉 繁, Chiba Shigeru)

== Theme song ==
- "Kizuna ~ Go-Busters! Gokai ni Arrange ver." (キズナ～ゴーバスターズ! 豪快にアレンジver., Kizuna ~ Gōbasutāzu! Gōkai ni Arenji Bājon)
  - Artist: Nazo no Shin Unit Starmen (謎の新ユニットＳＴＡ☆ＭＥＮ, Nazo no Shin Yunitto Sutāmen; The Mysterious New Unit Starmen)

== Reception ==
Tokumei Sentai Go-Busters vs. Kaizoku Sentai Gokaiger: The Movie earned $4.4 million at the Japanese box office.
