= Katsuhiro Suzuki (actor) =

Japanese actor and model

Katsuhiro Suzuki 鈴木勝大
- Born: Katsuhiro Suzuki; December 29, 1992 (age 32); Kanagawa Prefecture, Japan
- Occupation: Actor
- Years active: 2009–present
- Height: 173 cm (5 ft 8 in)
- Website: http://www.suzukikatsuhiro.com

Katsuhiro Suzuki (鈴木勝大, Suzuki Katsuhiro; born December 29, 1992 in Kanagawa Prefecture, Japan) is a Japanese actor and model known for his starring role as Hiromu Sakurada/Red Buster in the 2012 Super Sentai Series Tokumei Sentai Go-Busters. Until August 24, 2020, he was affiliated with Ever Green Entertainment. He is also a Keio University, Faculty of Environment and Information Studies student.

== Career ==
Suzuki started his debut on 2009 when he won Grand Prix in the 22nd Junon Super Boy contest. He also appeared in TBS All-Star Thanksgiving Akasaka 5-chome mini marathon where he placed 3rd on April 9, 2011.

In February 2012, he starred in the 36th Super Sentai series titled Tokumei Sentai Go-Busters as Hiromu Sakurada/Red Buster which made him the first actor born in the 1990s to play a Sentai Red Ranger.

== Filmography ==
=== TV Dramas ===
- Misaki Number One! as Hattori Katsuo (2011 )
- ShimaShima as Hayashida Rindou (2011)
- Hanazakari no Kimitachi e as Noe Shinji (2011)
- Tokumei Sentai Go-Busters as Sakurada Hiromu/Red Buster (2012 - 2013 )
- Limit as Hinata Haruaki (2013)
- Camouflage Family as Isawa Masahiko (2013)
- Yowakutemo Katemasu (2014)
- Kamen Rider Zi-O as Mondo Douan/Kamen Rider Quiz ( 2019)
- Kihei no kuni ( 2021)

=== Films ===
- Kaizoku Sentai Gokaiger vs. Space Sheriff Gavan: The Movie as Sakurada Hiromu/Red Buste (voice only) (2012)
- Kamen Rider × Super Sentai: Super Hero Taisen as Sakurada Hiromu/Red Buster (2012)
- Tokumei Sentai Go-Busters the Movie: Protect the Tokyo Enetower! Sakurada Hiromu/Red Buster (2012)
- Ouran High School Host Club as Hayato Tarumi (2012)
- Tokumei Sentai Go-Busters vs. Kaizoku Sentai Gokaiger: The Movie as Sakurada Hiromu/Red Buster (2013)
- Kamen Rider × Super Sentai × Space Sheriff: Super Hero Taisen Z as Sakurada Hiromu/Red Buster, Kamen Rider Decade (voice) (2013)
- Zyuden Sentai Kyoryuger vs. Go-Busters: The Great Dinosaur Battle! Farewell Our Eternal Friends as Hiromu Sakurada/Red Buster (2014)
- Make a Bow and Kiss (2017)
- Fly Me to the Saitama (2019)
- Come Kiss Me at 0:00 AM (2019)

=== Stage ===
- Ever Green Entertainment Show 2010 (26 日 7 Jan 2010 - 29)
- Osaero (August 26, 2010 – 30 days)
- (19 to 24 October 2011 年) SAKURA
- (2 to 7 November 2011 年) PRIDE
- Ever Green Entertainment Show 2011 Vol.2 (23 月 11 日, 2011 - December 3)
- Tumbling Vol.4 (4 days (Thursday) to August August 1, 2013 (Sunday), August 19, 2013 (Tue) - August 13 (month))
- Owari no Seraph The Musical

=== Original DVD ===
- Tokumei Sentai Go-Busters VS Green Buster Pink (2012) as Hiromu Sakurada/Red Buster
- Returns! Tokumei Sentai Go-Busters VS Dobutsu Sentai Go-Busters as Hiromu Sakurada/Red Buster/Red Cheetah (2013)

=== Events ===
- (March 25, 2010) JUNON BOY FESTIVAL 2010
- MILK BOY Fashion Show (404 Not Fashion) (10 月 24, 2010)
- Recovery from the Great East Japan Earthquake Charity Event "Charity non Colle" (May 21, 2011)
- (August 30, 2011) School Festival 2011 Seventeen summer
- (January 28–29, 2012) Super Sentai series and new program special premiere presentation
- (March 31, 2012) non-no fashion event "Spring 2012 Colle"
- (August 24, 2012) School Festival 2012 Seventeen summer

== Participation work ==
=== CD ===
- Pack mini album Koro-chan "Tokumei Sentai Go-Busters" (April 25, 2012)

=== Publication ===
- "False carp alliance." Pinky Shueisha Bunko cover model
- I land Bunko "The world is changing and all" magic cover model
- MILKBOY 2011 WINTER catalog model
