= List of Tokumei Sentai Go-Busters episodes =

This is a list of Tokumei Sentai Go-Busters episodes. Each episode is called a "Mission".

== Episodes ==
No.	Title	Written by	Original release date
1	"Special Ops Sentai, Assemble!"; Transliteration: "Tokumei Sentai, Shūketsu seyo!" (Japanese: 特命戦隊、集結せよ！)	Yasuko Kobayashi	February 26, 2012
It is 2122 NCE. After receiving a special case, a young girl named Saaya Hishikawa arrives to the city on the motorcycle mode of his buddyroid. Cheeda Nick. In the city, Ryuji Iwasaki and Yoko Usami of the Energy Management Center watch a group of men siphoning a tank of Enetron. Deducing them to be members of Vaglass, they crash through the window before transforming into Blue Buster and Yellow Buster, respectively, to fight two of the energy thieves, revealed to be Vaglass's android foot soldiers called Buglers. After taking out the Buglers, they go after the last energy thief, revealed to be a being named Enter, as he escapes them and infects a power shovel to create the Metaloid Shovelloid. At the Energy Management Center, a new member to the Special Operations Unit named Miho Nakamura arrives prior to Shovelloid's attack on the city being detected in the city's Miyawa district. As the buddyroid Usada Lettuce explains to Miho what their branch and the Vaglass are, Ryuji and Yoko head out to face the Metaloid. Alerted to the countdown to the arrival of a Vaglass Megazord, Blue Buster and Yellow Buster are unable to stop the Metaloid in time as the Shovelzord appears. Things seem hopeless as the Megazord attacks the Enetron Facility until, after seeing his hospitalized sister about making his decision to fight for everyone's sake, Hiromu contacts the Energy Management Center to launch the CB-01 Cheetah. Transforming into Red Buster, Hiromu and Nick enter the CB-01 and transform the car into the Megazord Go-Buster Ace to fight the Shovelzord. Using its Buster Animal mode to catch its opponent off guard, Go-Buster Ace destroys Shovelzord as Blue Buster and Yellow Buster shut down the Shovelloid.
2	"A Promise Made 13 Years Ago"; Transliteration: "Jū-san Nen Mae no Yakusoku" (Japanese: 13年前の約束)	Yasuko Kobayashi	March 4, 2012
Using the GT-02 and the RH-03 to carry out the debris remains of the Shovelzord for analysis to counter the Vaglass, Ryuji tries to calm Yoko down about Hiromu getting special treatment while he reports to Kuroki and remembers him as his father's assistant. Suddenly, the Enetron Monitoring System alerts them as the Go-Busters head to an Enetron gas station in the Kazami district. While Hiromu fills Nick's Enetron tank, Ryuji follows the trail to the back of a nearby building where Enter is. However, with Hiromu freezing at the sight of a chicken and Yoko running low on candy, Ryuji is forced to deal with Enter on his own as Blue Buster while Usada explains to Miho the Go-Busters' Weakpoints. Luckily, finding a candy in her skirt pocket, and Nick carrying Hiromu away from the chicken, Yoko arrives before Enter falls back. As Enter proceeds to create the Metaloid Burnerloid, Kuroki reveals to Miho the events occurred thirteen years ago that created Messiah and forced his friends, Hiromu's parents, to sacrifice themselves to stop the entity from conquering the world. However, knowing that Messiah would return, Hiromu's father installed an Anti-Metavirus within Hiromu, Yoko, Ryuji, and their buddyroids so they can fight the virus. Alerted to a Vaglass Megazord countdown, Hiromu reminds Yoko and Ryuji of the promise they made over a decade ago to get their families back before intercepting Burnerloid. Managing to destroy Burnerloid four minutes before Megazord arrival, the Go-Busters return to the Energy Management Center to redeploy in their Buster Machines before the Burnerzord appears. While GT-02 and RH-03 deal in getting civilians to safety and putting the fire out, the CB-01 destroys two Bugzords before becoming Go-Buster Ace to shut down the Megazord. Through the Go-Busters bask in their victory, the moment is ruined when Hiromu offended Yoko.
3	"GT-02 Animal, Deploy!"; Transliteration: "Jī Tī Zero Tsū Animaru, Shutsugeki!" (Japanese: GT-02アニマル、出撃！)	Yasuko Kobayashi	March 11, 2012
After calming down Messiah to keep it from unknowingly destroying their transfer routes, Enter assumes the form of a doctor as he creates the Metaloid Needloid. Alerted to the Enetron leak, arriving to the Kadokura district and finding something not right about the hospital, the Go-Busters infiltrate and find the medical staff being turned into robots before being forced to fight them. They find Enter, who explains that causing humans to suffer is part of his directive. Finding they have forty-one minutes until Vaglass Megazord arrival, Ryuji sees Hiromu provoking Yoko about her age before she uses his Weakpoint on him. The three eventually find a doctor being chased by Buglers, assuming their Go-Buster forms to save him. The doctor reveals that Needloid is using the Enetron to convert humans to the point of putting the patients in the ICU at risk. With thirty minutes left, overhearing Blue Buster's plan to restore the hospital's Enetron while the others deal with Needloid, Enter increases Bugler numbers while putting the hospital on lock down. Managing to make it out, Blue Buster proceeds to reach the GT-02 and his buddyroid Gorisaki Banana while the others fight their way through the Buglers with Yellow Buster saving a little girl. Explaining to Hiromu that she is no longer the little girl who comforted years ago, he and Yoko reach an understanding with each other as they find Needloid and knock the Metaloid out of the hospital before destroying him. By that time, having the GT-02 assume Animal Mode to siphon Enetron from the tower for transport to the hospital, Blue Buster pilots his Buster Animal to evade the Needlezord as it attempts to steal the Enetron from the GT-02 prior to Go-Buster Ace showing up. With the GT-02 Gorilla making its way to the hospital to restore its Enetron supply, Go-Buster Ace manages to destroy Needlezord. With Hiromu and Yoko now having a full understanding of each other, they and Ryuji intend to fulfill the promise they all made years ago.
4	"Special Ops and Determination"; Transliteration: "Tokumei to Ketsui" (Japanese: 特命と決意)	Yasuko Kobayashi	March 18, 2012
Informed that the Buster Machines are being upgraded for better dealing with future Vaglass Megazord attacks, the Go-Busters are told that it is possible for them to enter Hyper Space to confront Messiah. With this in mind, Hiromu and Yoko feel there is a chance of reuniting with their families, though Kuroki believes that they were not able to survive the transportation that sent Messiah out of their reality. Alerted to Enter being sighted at the Enetron Management Bureau's Tōma Branch, Yoko and Ryuji express some concern in relation to Hiromu being the most affected by the event 13 years ago. Arriving at the Enetron Management Bureau complex, they find Enter eating a pizza, seemingly waiting for them, before he creates the Metaloid Cutterloid in front of them, and also revealing that a new model of Vaglass Megazord is being prepared and will be arriving in eight minutes. With Enter taking his leave, Cutterloid battles the Go-Busters as they transform to fight him, leading them on a wild goose chase that gets Red Buster wounded. Realizing Cutterloid is only bait, and how Metaloids function as beacons for their Megazord counterparts, Hiromu has Cheeda Nick protect both the Enetron tank in Tōma and another beyond the mountains as potential targets. Though Ryuji asks him if he intends to be reckless, considering what the commander said to them, as it appears Hiromu intends to intercept the Megazord. Hiromu touched the two by pointing out that there may still be a chance that their families loaded the Anti-Metavirus into themselves as well and they may still be alive. However, Cutterloid refuses to allow them to meddle in affairs as Blue Buster and Yellow Buster hold the robot off seconds before the arrival of the Cutterzord. Entering the CB-01 Cheetah and turning it into Go-Buster Ace, Red Buster battles the Vaglass Megazord. However, this new type of Megazord has been outfitted with defenses that allow it to overwhelm Go-Buster Ace, and it manages to siphon the Enetron and transmit it to Messiah. As Gorisaki Banana and Usada Lettuce pilot the GT-02 Gorilla and the RH-03 Rabbit on their own to support, Blue Buster and Yellow Buster scrap the Cutterloid. In a gamble, having had Cheeda Nick restore some of Go-Buster Ace's functions by shutting down the life support system, Red Buster manages to shut down the Cutterzord as Enter takes his leave. After helping Hiromu back, they learn that Kuroki manipulated them in an attempt to track the location of the Vaglass's base of operations, expressing his resolve to put an end to Messiah by any means.
5	"Dangerous Overheated Rampage!"; Transliteration: "Kiken na Netsu Bōsō!" (Japanese: キケンな熱暴走！)	Yasuko Kobayashi	March 25, 2012
Watching the Cutterzord about to be analyzed, the Go-Busters receive a review of the three known Vaglass Megazord types being nothing more than shells, before they receive a mission to help transport an Enetron tank convoy to Nishizawa district. However, Enter creates the high speed Metaloid Tireloid to chase after the Enetron on foot. While Red Buster manages to save the truck by blasting a tire that Tireloid's special beam attack made go awry, Blue Buster and Yellow Buster fight Tireloid and the Buglers before the former uses his Super Power to break the Metaloid's hands. However, his Weakpoint takes over, and he becomes an entirely different person who attacks friend and foe alike. Blue Buster mercilessly tortures Tireloid before destroying him, and is about to attack Yoko when he overheats and passes out. Gorisaki cools the unconscious Ryuji down, and Yoko breaks down in tears from what just happened. However, Kuroki contacts her and orders her to meet with Hiromu. Learning that Ryuji is out of commission for the time being, and a Vaglass Megazord is coming in six minutes, Hiromu and Nick are left on their own to oversee the convoy until Yoko joins them. As Yellow Buster accompanies the convoy in the RH-03 Rabbit, Red Buster intercepts the Tirezord in the CB-01. But when his Weak Point takes effect, Go-Buster Ace is frozen as the RH-03 Rabbit is forced to hold off the Tirezord before Blue Buster comes to her aid in the GT-02 Gorilla. After accepting his apology, Yellow Buster has the RH-03 assume Animal Mode to kick Tirezord back from Go-Buster Ace as Red Buster regains mobility to destroy the Megazord. As the Enetron convoy reaches its destination, something odd is occurring in the hangar where the Cutterzord is stationed.
6	"Combine! Go-Buster-King"; Transliteration: "Gattai! Gōbasutāō" (Japanese: 合体！ゴーバスターオー)	Yasuko Kobayashi	April 1, 2012
After failing a simulation that would combine the Go-Buster Ace with the GT-02 Gorilla and the RH-03 Rabbit for the twentieth time, Hiromu apologizes for hesitating in the formation as Ryuji suggests that maybe it is not the younger member's skills that are the issue. Later, while wondering if he should go faster, Nick reminds Hiromu how he and Ryuji met with the latter teaching him to throw rocks across the lake. Though Nick explains that Ryuji may know the problem, Hiromu sees no need to ask for help. Suddenly, the headquarters' alarms ring as Enter, having used a fragment from the Cutterzord to find an entrance in the Ijima district, invades the Energy Management Center's headquarters with the newly created Sprayloid to make his way to Hangar 7 where Cutterzord is being held. Having the Buglers hold the Go-Busters at bay, Enter finds the Cutterzord and hacks into the EMC mainframe to reactivate the Megazord, while warning another will be coming in nine minutes. As the Go-Busters arrive, Cutterzord's projectiles seal the blast doors as Enter enters the hangar's self-destruct sequence before leaving the Go-Busters to die with a suicidal Sprayloid. However, Blue Buster throws Red Buster out of the hangar so he use the Go-Buster Ace to get his teammates out while they destroy Sprayloid. Though the summoned Sprayzord interferes with the Go-Buster Ace's attack on the hangar, Blue Buster and Yellow Buster escape in time. Having realized that he must trust his teammates as they trust him, Red Buster combines the Buster Machines to form Go-Buster-King to deal with the Cutterzord and Sprayzord, destroying the Vaglass Megazords with the Dimension Crash attack.
7	"Bad Maintenance on the Ace?!"; Transliteration: "Ēsu Seibi Furyō?!" (Japanese: エース整備不良?!)	Nobuhiro Mouri	April 8, 2012
After the formation of Go-Buster Oh, the Buster Machines are going under maintenance. But during the repairs, the Go-Busters meet a klutzy rookie mechanic named Mamoru Koyama who has just joined the maintenance team for Go-Buster Ace much to Hiromu's dismay as he talks about the newbie's unprofessional conduct. Later, the Go-Busters are alerted to Enter's arrival in the Hayashibara district as he creates Denshaloid with a Vaglass Megazord prepared to be transported into the city within thirty minutes. As the Go-Busters arrive, Enter reveals his intent to use Denshaloid to gather enough Enetron to produce more Metaloids and in turn get more Vaglass Megazords deployed. After taking out the Buglers blocking their path, the Go-Busters learn that Go-Buster Ace has suffered an Enetron malfunction as Hiromu draws back and learns that it was Koyama's fault for not properly checking the charging system. Later, Cheeda Nick tries to convince his partner that Koyama is not all bad, but Hiromu is still upset. Blue Buster and Yellow Buster intercept Denshaloid and derail it so it can run into Red Buster who fights it before he suddenly freezes at the sight of a chicken-shaped weather vane. Luckily, the others arrive to destroy the weather vane and enable him to catch up the Metaloid. The three Go-Busters proceed to overwhelm Denshaloid before they destroy him. By that time, the Denshazord arrives with two Bugzords to assume a train formation to get to an Enetron tank. As the GT-02 Gorilla and the RH-03 Rabbit battle the Vaglass Megazords, Red Buster returns to the hangar where he finds Koyama repairing Go-Buster Ace and he apologizes to him. With the Megazord's repairs complete, Hiromu tells Koyama to not let his failure get to him, and Koyama realizes that his fight against the Vaglass is being part of the maintenance crew. Red Buster deploys Go-Buster Ace to form Go-Buster Oh to counter the Vaglass Megazords' train formation. After taking out the Bugzords, Go-Buster Oh destroys the Denshazord. Later, after returning to the hangar, Hiromu leaves Go-Buster Ace in Koyama's hands.
8	"Protect the Machine Blueprints!"; Transliteration: "Mashin Sekkeizu o Mamore!" (Japanese: マシン設計図を守れ！)	Yasuko Kobayashi	April 15, 2012
After piloting the GT-02 Gorilla to get in some target practice, Ryuji meets with the others as Kuroki reveals that Enter has been sighted at the Megazord Development Facility and is likely after the blueprints to a new Buster Machine. When the Go-Busters intercept Enter when he poses as a cop during an uproar he caused, he uses Buglers to cover him as he tries to reach the blast doors. However, after failing to get through in time, Enter escapes as Ryuji meets his old high school friend Kazuya. Kazuya takes the Go-Busters to the blueprints of the new Buster Machine BC-04, with the group realizing that Enter may be after them to fortify the Vaglass forces. Ryuji reveals that he and Kazuya were both interested in Megazords as high school students, but after the incident 13 years ago, Ryuji was forced to give up his dream. Soon after, the EMC staff are alerted to the creation of Drilloid and contact the Go-Busters of a Vaglass Megazord's arrival within three minutes. Realizing that Enter has an inside man, Ryuji decides to stay behind as the others enter the Buster Machines to deal with the enemy Megazord. However, though seeming to be a no-show, Red Buster realizes their enemy is underground. By that time, and realizing Kazuya has been helping Enter, Ryuji confronts Kazuya when he finds him copying the blueprint data into a memory drive and is shocked to find how disillusioned his friend became just before Drilloid arrives and downloads the data with Ryuji forced to destroy the computer. However, Drilloid notices the memory drive with Blue Buster holding the Metaloid off as Kazuya runs off with the item. Sadly, as Blue Buster destroys Drilloid, Kazuya's memory drive is stolen by Enter and fails his mission. Coming to the others' aid in the GT-02 Gorilla, Blue Buster joins the others in forming Go-Buster Oh and forcing the Drillzord to the surface so they can destroy it. Later, Ryuji finds a regretful Kazuya and he forgives his old friend while telling him to continue working for both him and their mentors.
9	"Usada Recovery Strategy!"; Transliteration: "Usada Dakkan Sakusen!" (Japanese: ウサダ奪還作戦！)	Yasuko Kobayashi	April 22, 2012
After returning some Enetron on his own, Usada finds himself being kidnapped. Learning of this, Hiromu and Ryuji are forced to reveal their attempt to help Yoko with her homework caused Usada to blow a fuse as his resulting ranting on her inability to do anything right without him caused the buddyroid and her to have a major fall out. Tracking Usada's signal, the Go-Busters track the buddyroid to his location while, however, having hacked into the phone system, Enter overhears the ransom and decides to kidnap Usada for his agenda of utilizing the BC-04 blue prints. Using his Buglers to fend the Go-Busters off, Enter spirits Usada off while leaving a bomb to cover his tracks. After taking the kidnappers to the proper authorities, the Go-Busters learn that Enter blocked Usada's signal as he hacks the TV airwaves to deliver his demands for 20,000 Enetron within the hour or he will detonate the bomb on Usada. As the Energy Management Center is washing their hands on the matter, the Go-Busters are on their own with Yoko having an idea. Using a truck, with Morishita and Miho respectively posing as Hiromu and her, Yoko makes her move as Enter summons a pair of Bugzords from what remained of the Drillzord with the Go-Busters seemingly forced to deal with the Megazord. Inspecting the truck, Enter finds it filled with only water before seeing Yoko saving Usada. With Enter speeding up the detonation timer in response, with them arguing over whose safety is more important, Usada and Yoko admit their refusal to see the other die before the chain breaks and the buddyroid is seemingly destroyed in the blast. However, Enter learns that Hiromu and Ryuji faked their departure to save Usada and reveal that Nick and Gorisaki dealing with the Bugzords on their own in the CB-01 and the GT-02. Losing it over what he considers a valuable lesson in understanding his enemies. Enter furiously attacks as the Go-Busters fend up his tendrils before he takes his leave. Riding the RH-03, Red Buster and Blue Buster enter their Buster Machines as they and Yellow Buster have their machines assume Animal Mode. After the CB-01 becomes Go-Buster Ace, the Buster Machines destroy the Bugzords. Soon after, Yoko finds herself being chased by Usada over her using Kuroki to help her in her homework.
10	"The Reason We Fight"; Transliteration: "Tatakau Riyū" (Japanese: 戦う理由)	Yasuko Kobayashi	April 29, 2012
After taking out an army of Buglers, with Blue Buster's Weakpoint taking effect during the fight, the Go-Busters learn that the grunts are a distraction used by Enter so he enter the Sawatari district to steal a crate holding 500 tons of the metal alloy known as Deltanium 39 so he can build the BC-04. Realizing that using a Megazord to transport the alloy to Messiah is the next phase of Enter's plans, the Go-Busters are placed on standby. In the interim, Nick tries to get Hiromu to see his sister Rika's new art exhibition, but Hiromu refuses to go. Nick decides that it should be his job to try to square things out between the brother and sister, even though Rika despises him. Though he gets lost in near the Ōmae district, Nick finds Rika as he tries to convince her of the importance of Hiromu fighting Vaglass. However, believing that he and the EMC purposely drafted Hiromu to their case, she accuses him that all he wants to do is break her family up. Before he can say anything, Nick gets alerted of a Metaloid sighting with a Vaglass Megazord's arrival within 30 minutes. And on top of that, the Deltanium 39 crate is guarded by Meta-Cell infected humans. As the GT-02 prepares confront the Megazord, with the RH-03 attempting to get to the crate, Hiromu arrives to the building as Nick arrives with Rika, much to his dismay. Though she tries to convince him to quit being a Go-Buster, Hiromu ignores her in order to save a family with a young child and then tells her that he fights the Vaglass because it was his decision to join the Go-Busters. He leaves his sister to transform and enter a nearby building to stop the Deltanium 39 theft. Racing upstairs, Red Buster is confronted by the Metaloid Danganloid, as Enter speaks to him over an intercom to explain that the Metaloid was made just for fighting him. Danganloid manages to overpower Red Buster in a high-speed battle, matching the Go-Buster's every move. Upon the Danganzord's arrival, as Nick explains to Rika of Hiromu's resolve to ensure no family ever suffers as they have by the Vaglass, Red Buster manages to use Danganloid's speed to destroy him as Yellow Buster knocks out the Meta-Cell infected people. Though Red Buster and Nick manage to save a Meta-Cell inflected boy, the Danganzord manages to transport the crate into Hyper Space. With the mission over, Enter deletes the Meta-Cells just as he leaves. As Rika now understands her brother upon seeing the family reunited, Red Buster enters the CB-01 to join the fight. Forming Go-Buster Oh, the Go-Busters destroy the Danganzord. Hiromu and Nick try to track down Rika later, but they cannot find her, only to find a sketch book with a drawing the Sakurada family and an animalized Nick, Rika's way of accepting the buddyroid into the family.
11	"The Targeted Weakpoint"; Transliteration: "Nerawareta Uīkupointo" (Japanese: ねらわれたウイークポイント)	Kento Shimoyama	May 6, 2012
After the last time Ryuji's Weakpoint got the best of him, Gorisaki has created a safety device for his partner that will alert him of his body temperature. However, while cornering Enter when he is about to obtain Enetron, the safety device's warning signal disrupts team's concentration before Enter entangles him in his tendrils. But after seeing Blue Buster overheat, Enter decides to take his leave, much to everyone's confusion. Gorisaki frets over what happened as Nick and Usada try to assure him that Ryuji will not be mad at him. Although that is the case, even after his later attempt to modify the safety device with a cooling function, Gorisaki goes to the top of a building after seeing Usada and Nick being close with their human partners. Joined by Nick, Gorisaki confides in him that he is a bit jealous of him and Usada for having made such relationships with their partners while feeling that Ryuji is holding back his feelings. The two buddyroids are soon alerted to a Vaglass Megazord sighting within seven minutes. Taking Gorisaki's device with him, Ryuji and the other Go-Busters arrive to the Kameno district where they are ambushed by the Metaloid Fanloid and his powerful wind gusts. After being informed of the Megazord's arrival within a minute, Red Buster enters Go-Buster Ace to battle the Fanzord while leaving his teammates to deal with Fanloid. After having Yellow Buster leave to aid Go-Buster Ace in the RH-03, only for her and Usada to get blown away, Blue Buster finds himself in a jam as his Weakpoint begins to manifest. By then, Enter reveals that he has studied Blue Buster's Weakpoint and has set this plan up to finish the Go-Buster off at his leisure once he loses consciousness. Refusing to allow it to happen, Gorisaki goes against orders to cover Blue Buster so he can damage the Metaloid's fan and destroy him. A mortified Enter teleports away as Gorisaki collapses from the strain from the Metaloid's attack. Screaming at his buddyroid for doing such a stupid thing, Ryuji realizes that Gorisaki wanted him to open up to him. With the GT-02 Gorilla's arrival, Go-Buster Ace manages to destroy the Fanzord. Soon after, upon giving the device back to Gorisaki while expressing how annoying it is, Ryuji promises to be more open with Gorisaki about his feelings. Agreeing to do the same, Gorisaki mistakenly expresses of all Ryuji's character flaws before his partner chases the buddyroid around with the others watching.
12	"You Like Going Undercover?"; Transliteration: "Hensō wa Osuki?" (Japanese: 変装はお好き？)	Nobuhiro Mouri	May 13, 2012
Since the incident with the Fanzord, Yoko has been going through simulation training to improve herself while Miho is astonished to find Yoko does nothing else but train and sleep. The Megazord Development Facility then contacts Kuroki of Vaglass's next move to obtain a crystal used for their Megazords' optics. Though the material of the ore can not manifest in Japan, such crystals are being brought into the country by Hong Kong pop idol Angie Sue, whom everyone realizes is the spitting image of Yoko. Three days later at the Rinto district, the Go-Busters assume positions around the conference for Angie's upcoming movie as they are alerted to a Metaloid with a Vaglass Megazord to appear in four hours and thirty minutes. Despite Yoko detecting the Metaloid nearby, the signal suddenly vanishes before Ryuji saves Angie from a crazed woman that Hiromu holds off. The woman turns out to be the Metaloid Copyloid as the confused Go-Busters fight him. However, managing to outrun the Go-Busters, Copyloid assumes a businessman's form to elude them. Realizing what has occurred and that the Metaloid will attack the conference in conjunction to the Megazord attack, the Go-Busters are forced to head for the conference. But Angie mentions that she wants to fulfill her dream of becoming an international star before Yoko insults her dreams. Upon learning that Angie's earrings were a gift from her mother, Yoko is astonished when she is asked by the actress if she has a dream of her own. By then, Ryuji comes up with a plan to counter Copyloid by having Yoko pose as the actress. While getting ready, and after talking with Hiromu and Ryuji about their dreams, Yoko admits to Angie that she has no dream of her own but she will defeat Vaglass to see that everyone's dreams will come true. As Red Buster enters Go-Buster Ace to battle the Copyzord once it arrives and copies his Megazord's form, Yoko proceeds to the conference before Copyloid makes his move. Kicking the Metaloid upside his head, Copyloid reverts to his true form as Yoko fights him off with Angie's manager covering the fight as a stunt performance. Managing to take one of the earrings, Copyloid runs away and gets the crystal to Enter. As Enter takes his leave with his creation attempting to get the other earring, Ryuji backs up Yoko as they assume their Go-Buster forms to destroy Copyloid while the real Angie attends her conference. Arriving to find Go-Buster Ace fighting its copy, Yellow Buster resolves to fire on both before the Copyzord returns to its true form. Forming Go-Buster Oh, the Go-Busters destroy the Vaglass Megazord. Later, though feeling lousy about losing the earring, Yoko learns that Angie sent her an e-mail expressing both her gratitude and a Nyutube video of Yoko fighting Copyloid, cheering her up, until Usada mistakenly insults her, causing everyone to chase after him.
13	"A Surprising Day Off"; Transliteration: "Sapuraizu na Kyūjitsu" (Japanese: サプライズな休日)	Yasuko Kobayashi	May 20, 2012
Yoko is given the day off from work with Hiromu and Ryuji assigned to accompany her on a surprise tour for their buddyroids. Starting with having Gorisaki see the animals at the Kamine Zoo, and then a visit to the Tokyo Dome Attraction theme park for Usada to enjoy the rides. However, a Metaloid signal is detected nearby and forces the Go-Busters to intercept it, much to Usada's dismay. Finding Tubaloid, the buddyroids help get the civilians to safety while the Go-Busters deal with the Buglers before they are alerted to a Vaglass Megazord coming in 2 minutes and 30 seconds, along with discovering that Kuroki is not in the base. As Red Buster heads off in the CB-01 to intercept the Tubazord, Blue Buster and a fired up Yellow Buster battle Tubaloid. However, though realizing both Tubaloid and the Tubazord are using weak attacks, the former being easily hurt by Blue Buster and the later being easily destroyed by Go-Buster Ace, Tubaloid escapes. While the others track down Tubaloid, after having Usada go on the rides, Yoko meets up with Hiromu before revealing to him the surprise she has in store for Nick and hints about a back-up for him and Ryuji. By then, Tubaloid makes his move again with Hiromu taking the hit meant for Yoko. After being alerted to another Metaloid being created with another Vaglass Megazord to appear in 28 minutes, the Go-Busters fight Tubaloid and the Buglers while Gorisaki takes Usada back to the base. Seeing Yellow Buster dodging Tubaloid's fanfare sound wave, Red Buster and Blue Buster realize that the Metaloid has been made to counter her abilities and destroy him before he completes his objective. However, Tubaloid 2 appears, walking through what remains of his predecessor to subject the Go-Busters to his much more powerful musical attacks.
14	"Ça va? Rescue Strategy"; Transliteration: "Saba? Kyūshutsu Sakusen" (Japanese: サバ？救出作戦)	Yasuko Kobayashi	May 27, 2012
Confronting a Metaloid identical to the previous one they destroyed, Red Buster and Blue Buster find themselves at a disadvantage though Yellow Buster is unaffected by Tubaloid 2's sound wave. Even though Nick arrives to even the odds, Yoko is captured as she momentarily left the fight to recharge. Damaging both Hiromu and Ryuji's Morphin Braces, Tubaloid 2 runs off with Yoko. As Gorisaki proceeds to repair their Morphin Braces, Hiromu and Ryuji receive a message from Tubaloid 2 using Yoko's Morphin Brace to tell them not to interfere with the second Megazord or Yoko will die. As Tubaloid 2's location is revealed to be in the Shimatani district, and learning that the original Tubaloid's sound wave attack was part of a 2-phase attack with Tubaloid 2, Hiromu and Ryuji prepare to head out anyway. However, Nakamura demands them to come with her to see the tables Yoko set up for the buddyroids, revealing that it is the day of their activation and that the surprise tour was more of a birthday tour. Assuring Nakamura that Yoko's life is a priority, and still having time, Hiromu and Ryuji make their way to Tubaloid 2's location to save Yoko. While Ryuji taking out the Bugler bodyguards, Hiromu poses as Enter to get close to the girl. Though seeing through his disguise as he recognizes Hiromu's heartbeat, Tubaloid 2 is caught off guard once Yoko gets candy in her system to offset her Weakpoint. After Gorisaki arrives to give the guys their Morphin Braces, they and Yoko assume their Go-Buster forms while revealing the gear has been modified to resist the Metaloid's music. After Tubaloid 2 is destroyed, the Go-Busters enter their Buster Machines to face Tubazord 2. Using the GT-02 Gorilla to negate the Tubazord 2's music, the Go-Busters form Go-Buster Oh to finish the Vaglass Megazord off. As the buddyroids' birthday party goes under way, Kuroki meets up with an old friend: the mysterious Beet Buster and his buddyroid Beet J. Stag.
15	"The Golden Warrior and the Silvery Buddy"; Transliteration: "Kin no Senshi to Gin no Badi" (Japanese: 金の戦士と銀のバディ)	Yasuko Kobayashi	June 3, 2012
Finding Gorisaki with his memento collection as the others look at them, Ryuji reveals to Hiromu and Yoko that he won second place a robotics contest judged by his idol Masato Jin, a genius researcher at the Transport Center who disappeared into Hyper Space long ago. At that time, after learning of an abnormality from Messiah's engineers over the Enetron he supplied, Enter decides to investigate the possible leak at his leisure while creating Soujikiloid to gather Enetron within the Hibiki district. Alerted to a Vaglass Megazord arrival within 21 and a half minutes, the Go-Busters arrive to find Soujikiloid politely sucking up Enetron from cars and having Buglers exchange his canisters for storage in a pickup truck. As the Buglers hold off the Go-Busters, Beet Buster and his buddyroid Beet J. Stag arrive to fight Soujikiloid before allowing him to fall back. When Hiromu accuses them letting the Metaloid escape, Ryuji admits having Beet-Buster's voice somewhere before as the new Go-Buster reveals himself to be Masato Jin before has Jay spirit them away. As Enter learns of Beet-Buster's existence, Kuroki reveals to the Go--Busters that he met Masato during the Tubaloid incident with Ryuji thinking it could be one of Enter's traps as Masato had seemingly not physically aged in 13 years despite the man's behavior. Once alerted to Soujikiloid's actions along the road of Ride district, the Go-Busters intercept him and provoke the Metaloid into a berserker rage as he attempts to kill them. As the Buster Machines are prepared, Masato and Jay arrive and respectively transform into Beet Buster and Stag Buster to hold Soujikiloid at bay while former tells the Go-Busters to deal with the Megazord. Hearing Beet-Buster scold Stag Buster while then respecting his Buddyroid's imperfections, Ryuji tells the others they can trust the two as they form Go-Buster Oh to destroy the Soujikizord once the GT-02 disable the Vaglass Megazord's vacuum attachment. Taking out the Buglers and then destroying Soujikiloid with their Morphin Blasters, Masato and Jay later catch the Go-Busters off guard when they steal the Enetron truck.
16	"The Man Who Came From Hyper Space"; Transliteration: "Akūkan kara Kita Otoko" (Japanese: 亜空間から来た男)	Yasuko Kobayashi	June 10, 2012
While still perplexed about Masato while believing he has the answers they are looking for, the Go-Busters are alerted to Beet J. Stag is trying to force his way in through one of the chutes for Enetron to the point of attempting to shoot the door down. After getting a few cans of Enetron, explaining the Enertron they pilfered is for Masato's use and that he was told to see Kuroki for refueling, Jay has no helpful information save that he came from Hyper Space. The Go-Busters decide to follow Jay to get their answers from Masato himself, Hiromu a bit fearful about what they might discover as he continues while the others go to Yūbara district to intercept the Metaloid Parabolaloid whom Enter created to track down Masato to interrogate him for what he knows relating to the Enetron leak. When confronted by Hiromu over the other scientists in Transport Center, the genius scientist admitting to be annoyed with the youth's father for deciding that event's outcome without considering what he and the others felt, Masato offers to reveal everything if Hiromu can beat him in a one-on-one fight. The assume their Go-Buster forms and take their fight to a warehouse, their duel interrupted by Enter and Paraboloid after the latter eluded Ryuji and Yoko to locate Beet Buster. Enter restrains Beet Buster while orders Parabolaloid to destroy the Go-Busters by first taking out Hiromu with his homing missiles. But Beet Buster lets one of the missiles lock onto him as he jumps towards Enter, obliterating them both in the resulting explosion. But Jay arrives and uses his Marker System to recreate Masato's physical form as Enter also reconstitutes, both revealed to be data-based form called avatars. Confessing to have to have pilfered the acquired Enetron while sending Jay to Earth as a lifeline and to means create his avatar body, Masato states his intentions to escape Hyper Space while telling the Go-Busters to improve themselves so he can achieve his goal. With Enter giving his forces permission to kill Masato and Jay, the five transformed Go-Busters fight Parabolaloid and the Buglers before being attacked by Enter manually-controlling the manifested Parabolazord. As Blue Buster and Yellow Buster destroy Parabolaloid, Go-Buster Ace fights the Parabolazord before being restrained by Bugzords. With Beet Buster deciding to help, he has Stag Buster summon their own Buster Machines: the BC-04 Beetle and the SJ-05 Stag Beetle. The BC-04 and the SJ-05 siphon the Bugzords' Enetron before destroying them as Go-Buster Ace does the same to the Parabolazord. Later, Masato reveals to the Go-Busters that was not with the other scientists at the time of Messiah's attack and thus has no idea what became of them. Masato gives the Go-Busters a Christmas music box that he had Jay bring from Hyper Space, renewing the Go-Busters' resolve.
17	"Its Name Is Go-Buster Beet!"; Transliteration: "Sono Na wa Gōbasutā Bīto!" (Japanese: その名はゴーバスタービート！)	Yasuko Kobayashi	June 17, 2012
After using the GT-02 to drive the BC-04 and the SJ-05 off an Enetron Tower, Ryuji confronts Masato about siphoning Enetron just as the others arrive. Before taking his leave, Masato tells the Go-Busters if they will, it will be once they are strong enough to face Messiah in Hyper Space, while noticing Ryuji's reaction to his teammates' resolve. Meeting with Ryuji alone, Masato confronts the man about him losing his desire to become an engineer and what gives him the drive to fight. After stating that keeping his word to Hiromu and Yoko is all the reason he needs, Ryuji receives a call from Kuroki for him and Masato to arrive to the Iwaguchi district to give the latter a supply of 2000 tons of Enetron. However, having followed Beet J. Stag, Enter gets on the RH-03 and uses the Enetron to create Forkloid as the tank crashes into the water with the resulting Megazord, presumed to be the new model Enter prepared, transporting to reality in a minute's time. Assuming their fighting forms, the Go-Busters battle Forkloid while the Forkzord appears. However, as Go-Buster Ace and the RH-03 are deployed to fight it, the Forkzord releases the new model Megazord, Type Delta, which is based on BC-04's specs, from its body. As Go-Buster Oh is defeated by the Type Delta Megazord and the Forkzord, the Beet and Stag Busters finish Forkloid off before coming to Blue Buster's aid as he uses the GT-02 Gorilla to shield the others from the enemy Megazords' attack. While having it and the SJ-05 attack the Forkzord, Beet Buster tells Blue Buster to fight because he needs a real personal reason to enable him to win. Motivated to become an engineer again once the Vaglass are defeated, Blue Buster uses the GT-02 to siphon the remaining Enetron reserves of Go-Buster Ace and the RH-03 to help the BC-04 Beetle and SJ-05 Stag Beetle destroy the Forkzord. From there, Beet Buster activates the BC-04 Beetle's transformation into Go-Buster Beet, and proceeded to shut down the new Megazord. As a mortified Enter teleports away, Masato gives Ryuji engineering books before taking the man's money as payment for the books. As Masato leaves, Ryuji finds himself being asked for money by everyone.
18	"Cooperative Operations 3,000 Meters In the Earth"; Transliteration: "Chitei Sanzen Mētoru no Kyōdō Sagyō" (Japanese: 地底3000メートルの共同作業)	Nobuhiro Mouri	June 24, 2012
While Yoko gets into an argument with Hiromu while she is studying beetles, Kuroki talks to Ryuji about the new development from Masato and Beet J. Stag before they are alerted to not only a Metaloid created in the Gunno district but Vaglass Megazord's arrival within seconds before no longer being detected. Arriving to find a hole 3,000 meters deep, the Go-Busters are at wits end on how to get down before being alerted to the Metaloid in the nearby factory. As Kuroki and the others analyze the hole, the Go-Busters find Drilloid 2 and fight him before he escapes underground. By then, Kuroki reveals that there is raw Enetron source underground before he gets a call from Masato. Taking Hiromu and Ryuji with him, using the former's Weakpoint to force his assistance, Masato leaves Jay with Yoko to track down Drilloid 2. Though confused by Jay's antics, Yoko is surprised when Drilloid 2 appears as she and Jay transform to fight the Metaloid. Yoko's Weakpoint soon takes effect and Drilloid 2 stops her from eating a sweet. However, Stag Buster holds him off so she can replenish her strength with some tree sap. Even though Stag Buster reveals that Masato has ordered him to follow her, Yellow Buster does not mind, just as they finish the Metaloid off. At that time, using the BC-04 to get to the bottom of the hole, Go-Buster Ace defends them while a pair of Bugzords appear on the surface for the GT-02 Gorilla to deal while the Megazord finds himself facing Drillzord 2 and even more Bugzords. After having Beet Buster lower the BC-04's crane down, Red Buster has Go-Buster Ace use the BC-04 to reel the Megazord back up to the surface. With the RH-03 Rabbit supporting the GT-02 Gorilla in destroying the Bugzords, and while Go-Buster Ace takes out the ones below, the SJ-05 Stag Beetle carries Drillzord 2 into the city as Go-Buster Beet fights the Vaglass Megazord before finishing it off. Soon after, Masato goes ballistic on Jay for blabbering about the orders he gave him to help Yoko.
19	"My Combination! Buster Hercules"; Transliteration: "Ore no Gattai! Basutā Herakuresu" (Japanese: 俺の合体！バスターヘラクレス)	Kento Shimoyama	July 1, 2012
After giving Beet J. Stag an Enetron Can to his specifications, the buddyroids feel the oddball does not know who they are. But Jay identifies each of them before offending Cheeda Nick by calling him "that bike guy" and takes the can back. Wanting to make himself more useful like Jay, Nick trains himself before being found by Gorisaki Banana and confides in him that Jay's words made him realize he wants to find his calling. After attempts to find his place in other fields, Nick tries karate in the Akigaya district and ends up meeting a group of children who remind him of how he trained Hiromu as a child. However, alerted of a Vaglass Megazord to appear in 4 hours and 20 minutes in the area, Nick encounters the Metaloid Spannerloid. Learning that Spannerloid intends to disassemble him, Nick is saved when Jay arrives for another Enetron Can before transforming into Stag Buster to fight the Metaloid. The Go-Busters arrive as they and Nick deal with the Buglers before they and Spannerloid outrun Stag Buster. Back at the Energy Management Center, after learning that Nick is trying to boost his own confidence, Hiromu tells his partner that he cannot work with him. While the Go-Busters go for the Metaloid, Nick wanders into Kajimoto district where he encounters Enter and Spannerloid just as the former reveals his goal is to take out the buddyroids to cripple the Go-Busters. Nick is nearly shut down by the two before Hiromu arrives, followed by Yellow Buster and Blue Buster. Kicking a despairing Nick away, Hiromu reminds him of what he told him as a child to never hold back and believe in himself just as Masato and Jay arrive so the latter can assure him that he is a vital teammate. With Enter taking his leave, Nick is moved by everyone as he recharges before Spannerloid arrives with Buglers. Standing back from the fight, Nick watches the Go-Busters take out the Buglers while Red Buster and Beet Buster finish Spannerloid off. Soon after, Go-Buster Oh, the BC-04 Beetle, and the SJ-05 Stag Beetle are deployed to face the Spannerzord and a Type Delta Megazord. The fight goes bad for the Go-Busters until Nick suggests transferring their power to one point of on Go-Buster Oh to deliver the death blow. By that time, Go-Buster Beet and the SJ-05 Stag Beetle combine to form Buster Hercules, using its Hercules Crisis attack with Go-Buster Oh's Explosion Kick to destroy both enemy Megazords. Soon after being repaired, Nick starts up another karate session at the park and has Hiromu join in. However, Hiromu ruins the moment by saying that Nick's bike mode is vital for him to move around and he will not be good for him as a fighter.
20	"Five-Part Concentration! Great Go-Buster!"; Transliteration: "Gotai Kesshū! Gurēto Gōbasutā!" (Japanese: 5体結集！グレートゴーバスター！)	Yasuko Kobayashi	July 8, 2012
Finding Hiromu with a Christmas music box before he goes to sleep, Yoko learns from Usada that the music box is Hiromu's last present from his parents before the accident 13 years ago. The next day, the team arrives at the Makuta district after being alerted to a Vaglass Megazord's transportation within 5 minutes and 30 seconds. While there, the Go-Busters encounter the Metaloid Filmloid as he creates copies of the Go-Busters. The Go-Busters fight their copies until the Filmzord arrives and creates a barrier around its surroundings. After Filmloid teleports away once his copies are defeated, Masato and Jay arrive to reveal the barrier the Filmzord has created is a projection of Hyper Space. He has been called in by Kuroki to reveal that the nature of Hyper Space, Masato offers their only chance is to modify Go-Buster Oh to combine with the BC-04 Beetle and SJ-05 Stag Beetle so it can enter Hyper Space and destroy the Megazord. Masato oversees the process, while warning Hiromu that it may cause him physical harm as he is the main pilot of the Megazord. The next day, with Masato and the Buster Machine crew still continuing their work, Yoko confronts Hiromu about the risks he is taking. He assures her that it would be okay and that that must save everyone. Alerted to Filmloid in the Iwatani district, the Go-Busters arrive and defeat the Buglers before Filmloid uses his projection ability to have them see their deepest desire in his new Sweet Dreams attack. Though Blue Buster and Yellow manage to see through it, Red Buster cannot as his deepest desire is to be reunited with his family. Losing against Filmloid, Blue Buster and Yellow Buster take a hit meant for Hiromu. But at the last second, despite Filmloid's gloating, Red Buster snaps out of the delusion in time to save his friends as he is forced to discard Filmloid's delusion to destroy the Metaloid with extreme prejudice. Once alerted that he has completed the modifications, the Go-Busters arrive as they, Masato, and Jay witness the formation of Great Go-Buster. Great Go-Buster then is deployed into the Hyper Space projection, and they fight the Filmzord before destroying it. Upon seeing Messiah's apparent form as the Hyper Space projection collapses and Enter falls back, Hiromu loses consciousness from the strain, but has a content look on his face.
21	"Farewell, Blue Buster"; Transliteration: "Saraba Burū Basutā" (Japanese: さらば ブルーバスター)	Yasuko Kobayashi	July 15, 2012
Finding the Energy Management Center base's air conditioner on the fritz, Hiromu and Yoko find Ryuji overheating before he loses consciousness. After the others get him to the medical ward, having met Masato earlier, Gorisaki frets when told by the man that Ryuji's inclusive medical checkup says he might die the next time he goes berserk. Hiromu and Yoko come up with a plan to save Ryuji before they are deployed to the Nakaya district where they face off against Dumbbellloid before they find themselves exercising against their will, allowing the Metaloid to escape. Soon after, when playing the age card, Hiromu convinces Kuroki to make Morishita the new Blue Buster, much to Ryuji's dismay. After the others train Morishita, telling him and Nakamura what they have learned, Hiromu and Yoko are alerted to the Rindo district where Dumbbellloid calls them out, as Beet Buster and Stag Buster join the fight. With Stag Buster forced into exercising, the others battle Dumbbellloid as buddyroids enter the Buster Machines to face the Vaglass Megazord within 10 minutes' time. Overhearing Nakamura telling Kuroki of his condition, a speechless Ryuji takes his Buster Gear back to join the fight. Even after being told this might be his last fight and he can choose how he goes, Ryuji becomes Blue Buster to battle Dumbbellloid with a feat of strength before destroying him. By that time, after Stag Buster frees the others, Beet Buster reveals that he was joking to Gorisaki earlier, as Red Buster and Yellow Buster relay this new bit of information to Ryuji. By then, the Dumbbellzord arrives with Buster Hercules formed to back up the GT-02 Gorilla as it sends the Vaglass Megazord flying. With the enemy dealt with, Blue Buster uses the GT-02 Gorilla to attack Buster Hercules for the trouble Masato put him through. Later, as Ryuji gets Masato and Jay in a double headlock, Hiromu and Yoko are glad their friend is all right.
22	"The Beautiful Avatar: Escape"; Transliteration: "Utsukushiki Abatā Esukeipu" (Japanese: 美しきアバター エスケイプ)	Yasuko Kobayashi	July 22, 2012
While looking at the Energy Management Center building, Enter is jumped by a mysterious woman revealed to be an avatar, like himself, in the service of Messiah named Escape. At the Energy Management Center, the Go-Busters are alerted to an Enetron robbery to occur at the Ariadne Building hotel where they are holding an escape game. Though it is discovered to be a prank call, chances cannot be taken as Hiromu and Yoko enter incognito and learn that the prank was done by a boy named Shōta Segawa who has also joined the escape game with his friends Kaito and Rin. By that time, Escape makes her way into the hotel's parking lot and brings Keyloid to life as he proceeds to lock down the entire building. Having witnessed his action, Blue Buster fights Keyloid before Beet Buster and Stag Buster arrive for support. Inside, Escape and a group of Buglers hold the people hostage with Hiromu and Yoko forced to drop their cover when she is about to kill Shōta. Tricked into thinking that the Go-Busters are weak, a disappointed Escape takes her leave as she informs everyone that a Vaglass Megazord will come in 17 minutes to destroy the building. But upon learning that Keyloid's attack has been cancelled once his key arm has been broken off, a furious Escape orders the Buglers to keep everyone from leaving the building. After confronting Shōta about his need to be cool and their acting weak, Hiromu gets the boys to safety and Hiromu tells Shōta not to let others judge him and to trust himself before Escape and Keyloid arrive. With Shōta taking his friends to safety, the assembled Go-Busters transform to fight Escape and Keyloid with Enter overseeing the fight, all the while lamenting of having overstimulated Messiah. After Keyloid is destroyed, the Keyzord arrives and projects Hyper Space around itself. Great Go-Buster is formed to venture into the barrier and the group successfully destroys the Keyzord. As Escape takes her leave, Shōta apologizes to his friends for putting them in danger and they all forgive him.
23	"Those Who Follow Their Intent"; Transliteration: "Ishi o Tsugu Mono" (Japanese: 意志を継ぐ者)	Yasuko Kobayashi	July 29, 2012
Masato arrives at the Energy Management Center with a flower bouquet for Yoko on her birthday, and he reveals that he worked with Yoko's mother as the test pilot of the Megazords they built. Elsewhere, after pestering Enter over his meeting with Messiah and telling him they will now work together, Escape takes a child's toy magnet to create Jisyakuloid and cause suffering in the Iwagami district with his power to magnetize people. The Go-Busters are deployed to Jisyakuloid's location, with Hiromu and Cheeda Nick arriving first and getting magnetized. The other Go-Busters transform and battle Jisyakuloid and the Buglers before Jay and Ryuji end up magnetized, as well, before the Metaloid escapes when Beet Buster attempts to hit his Weakpoint. As the others are taken back to the Energy Management Center, Masato sees Yoko's mother in her when she tries to cheer a girl up whose is separated from her mother by Jisyakuloid's magnetism. Elsewhere, as Jisyakuloid repairs his face, the Jisyakuzord arrives and siphons an Enetron tank. With Gorisaki sending them prototype GB-Protection suits to make them immune to Jisyakuloid's attack, Masato and Yoko track down the Metaloid in the Kitamura district. However, Escape arrives and destroys Masato's protection suit as he and Yoko take cover. It is at this time that Yoko learns that Masato's physical body stuck in Hyper Space suffers whatever physical harm his avatar endures. Refusing to let him sacrifice himself for her mother's sake, Yoko knocks Masato out and charges Escape head on while changing into Yellow Buster, as the others drive her off. With Masato covering, Yellow Buster destroys Jisyakuloid's magnetic hair as the assembled Go-Busters finally destroy the Metaloid from all sides. Forming Go-Buster Oh, the Go-Busters hold the Jisyakuzord off while Buster Beet magnetizes the Enetron tank to retrieve he stolen Enetron, right before Go-Buster Oh destroys the Vaglass Megazord. Soon after, upon seeing the girl and her mother reunited, Masato admits that Yoko reminds him of her mother. Watching him leave, Ryuji worries about Masato's real intentions for risking his life.
24	"A très bien Summer Festival"; Transliteration: "Torebian na Natsu Matsuri" (Japanese: トレビアンな夏祭り)	Nobuhiro Mouri	August 5, 2012
As they wonder where Hiromu is, Ryuji and Yoko are given a summer festival pamphlet by Gorisaki which Nick dropped before he and Hiromu left the building. When they arrive at the summer festival, Ryuji and Yoko find Nick helping performers with Hiromu amongst them. Seeing the others, not having told them that he is a Go-Buster, Hiromu reveals that they are old middle school friends from a street performance club who need his help. Soon after, the Go-Busters are alerted to a Metaloid attack in the Shishida district with a Vaglass Megazord coming in 55 minutes. However, when Hiromu's teacher Ms. Kyoko Shitara arrives, Ryuji and Yoko decide to go without him to meet up with Masato and Jay as they fight Enter and Wataameloid. Learning that Enter is targeting summer festivals, Hiromu reveals that the festival cannot not be canceled as he reveals he owes Ms. Shitara a favor for teaching him the value of friendship and that she is soon leaving the country. The Go-Busters wait until Wataameloid is detected, again, with the Wataamezord arriving three minutes later. As the others hold Wataameloid off, Red Buster saves Ms. Shitara while Go-Buster Beet and the SJ-05 fend off the Wataamezord. She asks Red Buster why he saved her, but he does not answer but gives her a photo of them. Once Ms. Shitara leaves, Red Buster enters the CB-01 and uses Go-Buster Ace to join the fight with the Wataamezord. As Blue Buster and Yellow Buster destroy Wataameloid before he can absorb their Ichigan Busters' energy, Go-Buster Ace uses the SJ-05 to destroy the Wataamezord. Later, Hiromu learns that Ms. Shitara knew he saved her and he says how proud she is of him while giving him a copy of their photo to remember her by as they proceed with the festival.
25	"Pursue the Mystery of the Avatars!"; Transliteration: "Abatā no Nazo o Oe!" (Japanese: アバターの謎を追え！)	Yasuko Kobayashi	August 12, 2012
It is Obon, and as Masato's ghost stories freak Yoko and the buddyroids out, Ryuji confides to Kuroki of his concern about the nature of Masato's avatar. The next day, alerted to a Vaglass Megazord arriving within 52 minutes, the Go-Busters arrive to the Bakuta district to find a group of people having nightmares as the Metaloid Rousokuloid reveals himself to be the cause. During the fight, Rousokuloid tricks the Go-Busters into looking at his flame, causing them to enter their own nightmares. Rousokuloid takes his leave before being hit by Masato as he and Jay transform to snuff out the Metaloid's flame to cancel the nightmares. His victims wake up, save Red Buster, whose nightmare was of a giant chicken and is rendered immobilized. Learning that death in a nightmare means death in real life, Ryuji attempts to have Masato reveal the truth about his nature. However, Masato instead tells Ryuji that becoming strong enough to enter Hyper Space should be his concern. Soon after, the Go-Busters are alerted that Rousokuloid is attempting to use the local television station to broadcast his hypnosis across the airwaves. When they arrive at the station, Escape makes her presence known. Blue Buster fights her, hoping she might give him answers, while the others deal with Rousokuloid. However, upon seeing that getting answers from her is not going to happen, Blue Buster purposely overheats himself and gives Escape the fight she desires as the Rousokuzord arrives with the CB-01 Cheetah fighting it and the Bugzords. After Yellow Buster and they finish Rousokuloid off, Beet Buster and Stag Buster use Buster Hercules to finish off the Rousokuzord. Blue Buster manages to defeat an astonished Escape, as she leaves satisfied just as he loses conscious. As the sun sets, Masato accepts Ryuji's way of fighting, despite still having issues with his avatar's state. Upon learning that Hiromu overheard him and Kuroki, Ryuji reveals that there is a chance that those who end up in Hyper Space may have lost their physical forms, and Hiromu assures him that they will find the truth.
26	"The Tiny Enemy! Control Room SOS"; Transliteration: "Chiisana Kyōteki! Shireishitsu Esu Ō Esu" (Japanese: 小さな強敵！司令室SOS)	Kento Shimoyama	August 19, 2012
At the Numaoka district, Enter uses an eraser in a vacant classroom to create a Metaloid, finding it odd that the transfiguration did not occur and tossed what he thought was a normal eraser as the resulting Vaglass Megazord begins to be transferred into reality. But it turns out that the eraser did transform into the pint-sized Keshigomuloid, running after his creator before finding him being confronted by the Go-Busters. Hiding his apparent failure, Enter tells them to be more concerned with the Vaglass Megazord coming in 32 minutes. As the Go-Busters and the control staff go their separate ways so Morishita and Nakamura can track down the Metaloid, Keshigomuloid latches unto Hiromu and uses him to erase the Energy Management Center's data undetected. Soon after Nakamura's attempt to give him back his pencil she borrowed earlier, Hiromu joins the others Go-Busters in deploying the Buster Machines to face the Keshigomuzord before it erased the Megazords' combine program before the GT-02's Animal Mode could hit the Type-Delta Megzaord. However, the BC-04 and SJ-05 arrive with Go-Buster Beet unable to form Buster Hercules. Back at the Energy Management Center, losing her cool and usual shyness, Nakamura suggests a manual combination by herself and Morishita. Going through the blueprints as the Megazords battle, Nakamura learns of Keshigomuloid as Kuroki deals with the pint-sized menace to give his aides time. Back at the fight, the SJ-05 combines with Go-Buster Ace to form Go-Buster Ace Stag Custom which destroys the Type Delta Megazord. By that time, with Go-Buster Beet holding the Keshigomuzord off, the Go-Busters manually form Go-Buster Oh on Nakamura's instructions as Morishita takes over after Kuroki loses consciousness from Keshigomuloid's headbutt. As Go-Buster Oh destroys the Keshigomuzord, Red Buster arrives in time to blast Keshigomuloid. Later, Nakamura gives Hiromu's pencil back to him, though he admits that she scares him now.
27	"An Out of Control Combo to Escape the Labyrinth!"; Transliteration: "Bōsō Konbi de Meikyū Dasshutsu!" (Japanese: 暴走コンビで迷宮脱出！)	Nobuhiro Mouri	August 26, 2012
Arriving at the Living Body Program Research Institute in the Kyōwa district, Enter intends to use the organic programming they are working on there to evolve Messiah. Elsewhere, after the Go-Busters have trouble getting used to the gravity produced by the Protector suits, they are alerted to Enter's attack. After being told by the Institute's head, Dr. Kudo, that it was a false alarm, Masato has Jay confirm that he was lying with Hiromu confirming it. As Enter proceeds to have Dr. Kudo use his research on Messiah, he creates Mushikagoloid and has a Vaglass Megazord arrive within 14 minutes. Alerted as Masato is forced to cancel his Avatar to avoid detection of his actual body within Hyper Space, the Go-Busters and Stag Buster battle the Buglers before Mushikagoloid has the Go-Busters chase after him. Splitting up, Blue Buster finds a ganguro girl who is Dr. Kudo's daughter Misaki who is unable to find her way to her father's lab. However, with Mushikagoloid's ability to create hologram walls, the Go-Busters find themselves in a labyrinth before Ryuji uncovers Mushikagoloid's trick. As Blue Buster deals with Buglers, the other Go-Busters chase after Mushikagoloid and destroy him. Upon finding Dr. Kudo, Blue Buster battles Enter before Dr. Kudo risks his well-being to protect Misaki from the villain. With Misaki and her father safe, Blue Buster manages to disconnect the evolving program and Enter falls back. Elsewhere, the Go-Busters find themselves facing the Mushikagozord as it creates a Hyper Space barrier, while Jay recreates the Masato avatar to help them. Forming Great Go-Buster to enter the dimension, and finding it compressing, the Go-Busters manage to negate the barrier long enough to destroy the Mushikagozord.
28	"Beware of Chickens!"; Transliteration: "Niwatori ni Chūi seyo!" (Japanese: ニワトリに注意せよ！)	Yasuko Kobayashi	September 2, 2012
Unable to find Messiah, and alerted by the engineers that their leader is in pain, Enter realizes that he is still evolving despite the Go-Busters' interference. Confronted by Escape in the Segawa district over why she can not connect with Messiah, Enter assures her that he has found a new purpose while creating Sprayloid 2 to cause confusion with the aided task to find out Red Buster's Weakpoint. Elsewhere, Hiromu and Cheeda Nick are about to attend Rika's party after winning a prize for the children's book she has been working on, even though she put a chicken on the cover. They are about to reach the reception when they are alerted that Sprayloid 2 is attacking, while Nick is worried about the chicken drawings in Rika's book. The pair confronts Sprayloid 2 when the Metaloid uses his appearance-altering spray to make Nick look like Hiromu. The other Go-Busters arrive on the scene to fight Sprayloid 2's Buglers, all the while he uses his spray paint to change everyone's appearances, confusing everyone in the fight. Beet J. Stag arrives on the scene, ready to fight anyone he thinks is with Vaglass without asking questions first, but he accidentally splashes the gang with water, washing away Sprayloid 2's paint. Meanwhile, Sprayloid 2 has seen Nick taking Rika away from the fight, so he uses the opportunity to disguise himself as her and he manages to trick Nick into revealing that Hiromu's Weakpoint is seeing a chicken. Upon realizing he has been duped, he tries to lie about what he said, but Beet Buster arrives and drives Sprayloid 2 off. After Hiromu takes Rika to the hospital, Nick reveals to the group that Hiromu's Weakpoint is derived from a phobia he gained as a child. The group is soon alerted that Sprayloid 2 is attacking the Asami district in an attempt to call out the Go-Busters to confirm Red Buster's Weakpoint. The Go-Busters arrive on the scene, but Hiromu has not transformed. He charges Sprayloid 2 head on, despite the various images of chickens in the area to try to trigger his Weakpoint. However, Hiromu is entirely unaffected, until Sprayloid 2 realizes that his opponent is none other than Cheeda Nick in disguise. Sprayloid 2 manages to find the real Hiromu and tries to use the chicken image on him, but Hiromu's sunglasses allow him to block his sight in time, ruining Sprayloid 2's plans as the Metaloid is destroyed by the Go-Busters. As Nick washes Sprayloid 2's paint off, Buster Hercules is used to locate Sprayzord 2, which has been disguised as a skyscraper, before destroying it. Later, while seeing Rika off, Hiromu and Nick learn that two dogs in Rika's book are named Gog and Magog, the same names as Escape's weapons. Rika tells the two that she named the dogs after their mother's favorite statues. At the Energy Management Center, Masato reveals that the events that occurred were actually a distraction for the Vaglass forces in Hyper Space to steal his Enetron supplies for Messiah who is creating a physical body with Enter witnessing his evolution.
29	"Breaking Into Hyper Space!"; Transliteration: "Akūkan e no Totsunyū!" (Japanese: 亜空間への突入！)	Yasuko Kobayashi	September 9, 2012
After having a nightmare involving Messiah, Cheeda Nick sees that Hiromu is still bothered by the connection between his mother and Escape. Hiromu is then alerted to a message from his father from Hyper Space that says the Go-Busters are needed to stop Messiah with a portal in three hours. Though the others are relieved that their parents are alive, Hiromu is unconvinced until Masato reveals that Doctor Sakurada and the others were forced to help the Vaglass while he sent Beet J. Stag and his avatar to prepare the Go-Busters for the battle with Messiah. He tells them that they will find out the truth once they reach Hyper Space. Despite not being prepared, the other Go-Busters decide that it is time to take the fight to Messiah in Hyper Space. As Nakamura finds the signal of the teleportation, the Go-Busters receive a layout of the Transport Research Center as Great Go-Buster is formed to be launched in a 30 minute time frame. However, having learned that one of their engineers has been supporting the Go-Busters, Enter employs Escape's assistance as they stage an attack on the Buster Machine hangar. After the Buglers are defeated, Enter and Escape go all out, with the former separating Red Buster from the others so the entire team can not enter Hyper Space. Once Great Go-Buster is formed with 21 minutes left for the marker to remain off, the other Go-Busters fall back to Hangar 02 with Escape at their heels. As for Red Buster, he is unable to outrun Enter as he is mortally wounded. However, motivated by his promise to his sister, Hiromu refuses to give in to the futility of the situation as Nick arrives to cover Hiromu's escape. Once with the others, as Escape and the Buglers arrive at the hangar, Great Go-Buster's entry into Hyper Space is covered by the Energy Management Center staff. After the Go-Busters enter Hyper Space, they are briefly shocked by the sight. They find themselves facing various Megazord models that Great Go-Buster manages to destroy. Using the Override System to negate the atmosphere, the Go-Busters enter the Transport Research Center where they encounter the newly evolved Messiah Cell who recreates Cutterloid, Keyloid, Forkloid, and Parabolaloid to fight them.
30	"Messiah Shutdown"; Transliteration: "Mesaia Shattodaun" (Japanese: メサイアシャットダウン)	Yasuko Kobayashi	September 16, 2012
The Go-Busters manage to defeat the revived Metaloids sent after them but find themselves powerless against Messiah in his Messiah Cell body. Beet Buster uses the BC-04 to cover the other Go-Busters' escape so they can reach the mainframe that is Messiah's core and destroy it. Arriving to the lab where their parents made their last stand years ago, Hiromu finds his mother's statues of Gog and Magog along with goggles similar to Enter's and French words written on photos of the scientists. Telling Ryuji and Yoko about the connection between his mother and Escape, Hiromu brings up the possibility that Enter and Escape are actual Avatars of multiple people but brings up the question of where the scientists whose aspects the two Avatars obtained are being kept. While the buddyroids return to the Buster Machines, the Go-Busters find projections of Hiromu's parents as they reveal Messiah had converted entire Transport Research Center into itself due to its ability to assimilate the inorganic materials and data. Though they plead them to end Messiah before he can enter reality and assimilate the Earth, Enter arrives and reveals that all of the scientists were absorbed into Messiah and thus they would die with him. They are knocked out of the Transportation Research Center by Messiah Cell to where Beet Buster and Stag Buster are fighting Escape. Though Yoko is conflicted about destroying Messiah and their parents, Hiromu apologizes to her for not keeping the promise they made to get back their families, as he sees honoring their final wishes to stop Messiah for good more important. Red Buster uses Go-Buster Ace to enter the Transportation Research Center to destroy Messiah's core but finds Enter in the Type-Epsilon Megazord defending the core. As Go-Buster Ace destroys the Type-Epsilon with Enter consumed in the explosion that damages the core, the other Go-Busters take advantage of Messiah's moment of weakness to destroy his Messiah Cell orm. This causes the entire core to self-destruct with Red Buster escaping the Transport Research Center just as it explodes. Soon after, with their parents by them in spirit to give him and Yoko closure, Hiromu returns with the other Go-Busters to reality where they are welcomed home after a successful mission.
31	"Space Sheriff Gavan Arrives!"; Transliteration: "Uchū Keiji Gyaban, Arawaru!" (Japanese: 宇宙刑事ギャバン、現る！)	Kento Shimoyama	September 23, 2012
When Vaglass was "defeated", the Go-Busters are surprised to be alerted to the appearance of a strange energy reading in the Deus district. The Go-Busters find a young woman being attacked by a strange monster before he takes his leave. The Go-Busters then turn to the young woman who introduces herself as Shelly, the partner of Gavan who has been recently deployed to protect Earth. Taking her to the Energy Management Center, Shelly reveals that the monster they saved her from is Rhino Doubler of the Space Mafia Makuu and that she was separated from Gavan while in pursuit of the Double Monster. As the others look for the Double Monster, Yoko takes Shelly out to look for Gavan before they are attacked by Rhino Doubler with Yellow Buster holding the Double Monster off as he sends the girls into Makuu Space. While trying to look for the ladies, Morishita confirms that the Vaglass are still active as a supply of Enetron is stolen from the Maria district with a Megazord arriving within 10 minutes. As Ryuji confronts the Metaloid Danganloid 2 before he and the Metaloid are also sucked into Makuu Space, Hiromu and Nick search for Yoko and Shelly before Cheeda Nick is jumped by a youth in black who demands where the latter is. Stopping, Hiromu learn the youth is Geki Jumonji, the current Gavan before being alerted of the Makuu Space portal with Geki telling Hiromu to stay behind while he saves his friends. But they are jumped by Buglers as Beet Buster and Stag Buster summon their Megazord to fight Danganzord 2. As Hiromu becomes Red Buster to fight the Buglers, Geki dons the Gavan Type-G combat suit. Convinced of his determination, Gavan lets Red Buster join him in Makuu Space as Go-Buster Beet covers them before forming Buster Hercules to destroy Danganzord 2. Arriving in the nick of time with the others to safety, Red Buster and Gavan battle Danganloid 2 and use a combination attack to destroy the Metaloid and return to Earth. Later, Geki convinces Kuroki to let him and Shelly stick around so they can work with the Go-Busters to find Rhino Doubler. Elsewhere, revealed he's still alive from the explosion of the Megazord Type Epsilon, Enter is still researching Rhino Doubler's Axial Divertor.
32	"Friendship Tag With Gavan!"; Transliteration: "Gyaban to no Yūjō Taggu!" (Japanese: ギャバンとの友情タッグ！)	Kento Shimoyama	September 30, 2012
After Morishita's debrief on Rhino Doubler results with the Go-Busters arguing among themselves, they and Geki are alerted to the Double Monster. However, though the Go-Busters and Gavan corner Rhino Doubler from all sides and overwhelm him, the Double Monster escapes when Stag Buster's energy reserves run low. Back at the base, after overhearing Geki's commenting with Shelly about how the Go-Busters lack teamwork, a depressed Morishita is approached by Nakamura who unknowingly convinced him to help their team by researching a way for the Go-Busters to contact them if they end up in Makuu Space again. Turning to the Dimensional Research Center for help in modifying the signal of the Morphin Braces, Morishita is sucked into Makuu Space along with the scientists as part of Rhino Doubler's goal to remove the best people from Earth. Though trapped in a cage, Morishita gives morale to the scientists as they continue the signal modification. After learning of the scientists' abduction, the Go-Busters and Gavan find Rhino Doubler at Central Stadium as he was about to go after the athletes. Sucked into Makuu Space along with Gavan, the Go-Busters are shocked to find the Double Monster having support from Enter. The Go-Busters and Gavan find themselves at a disadvantage against Enter and Rhino Doubler in battles that defy normal physics. Separated from the others, Blue Buster and Yellow Buster rescue Morishita and the scientists. After rejoining the others, with Beet Buster and Stag Buster giving him time to complete the loading, Morishita contact the Energy Management Center and have the Go-Busters regain access to their gear. The Go-Busters then use their Ichigan Buster Special Buster Modes in conjunction to Gavan's Gavan Dynamic to defeat Rhino Doubler. However, upon returning to their dimension, Enter installs a Metavirus into Rhino Doubler's lifeless body to convert the Double Monster into a data-based giant that opens a portal to a blended form of Hyper Space and Makuu Space that threatens to engulf the entire world. But, with support from Gavan's mecha Dol, Great Go-Buster destroys Rhino Doubler to cancel the portal. Later, with their mission over and seeing the Go-Busters are not as dysfunctional as they thought, Geki and Shelly take their leave to patrol the Milky Way. Once the Dolgiran is out of their viewing, the Go-Busters thank Morishita for his help before they return to base.
33	"Morphin! Powered Custom"; Transliteration: "Mōfin! Pawādo Kasutatamu" (Japanese: モーフィン！パワードカスタム)	Yasuko Kobayashi	October 7, 2012
While reviewing how Enter is still active after Messiah has been destroyed, the Go-Busters are alerted to a Metaloid in the Watamine district and find a massive sinkhole that sucked the Meijo International High School into it. But before they attempt to dig out the school with the Buster Machines, Enter tells them it would be pointless. Revealing that he saved Messiah's backup data in the form of the thirteen Messiah Cards, scattering the remaining twelve across the four winds eventually become Messiah Metaloids and evolve to a point that a new Messiah will be born like Sunadokeiloid. As the other fight Sunadokeiloid, with a Vaglass Megazord coming within four hours, Enter battles Red Buster as he reveals his intent to take Hiromu's data so he can become a true being with his game. Enter takes his leave as Red Buster aids his teammates, only to learn that Sunadokeiloid absorbed the people that were caught in the sinkhole he created with Cheeda Nick among the victims when he sacrificed himself to save a student. Once back at the Energy Management Center, Gorisaki Banana tells the Go-Busters that the Protectors could work against the new threat but decided to use himself and the other buddyroids for it to work as digitized power sources. Vowing to get Nick back, Hiromu gets the first Custom Visor before he and the others are deployed to an airplane hangar in the Nohiyama district is. Stopping Sunadokeiloid from causing another sinkhole and taking the fight outside, the Go-Busters are outmatched when Messiah manifests within the Messiah Metaloid yet they will not allow anyone to suffer like they have. Taking out the Custom Visor, knowing what his buddyroid attempted to tell him, Red Buster manages to shatter hourglass to free everyone Sunadokeiloid absorbed while absorbing Nick's data to assume Powered Custom form. Blue Buster and Yellow Buster follow suit as they and Red Buster defeat the Buglers with their enhanced Super Powers. Once Sunadokeiloid is destroyed, the Go-Busters prepare to deal with his Vaglass Megazord counterpart.
34	"The Enemy Is Beet Buster?!"; Transliteration: "Teki wa Bīto Basutā?!" (Japanese: 敵はビートバスター?!)	Yasuko Kobayashi	October 14, 2012
While patrolling for the remaining twelve Messiah Cards, due to the free time before Sunadokeiloid's Messiah Megazord counterpart arrives, Hiromu finds Masato playing with a kindergarten class and spirits him off to confront him about this childish behavior. However, a nearby Messiah Card infects Masato's oni puppet and uses Jay's Enetron to become Puppetloid. As Red Buster charges Puppetloid, Masato use what remained to become Beet Buster to fight the Messiah Metaloid before he jumps off and proceeds to use his right hand to take control of the kindergarten teacher Megumi and have her attack her class as Beet Buster attempts to restrain her. When Ryuji and Yoko arrive, his plan to get data from his puppet manipulation, Puppetloid transfers his control to Beet Buster as he suddenly attacks his Go-Buster allies while telling them to fight him. But on Enter's suggestion, Puppetloid takes Beet Buster to analyze his data through a torturous obstacle course so he can have a better understanding on the Go-Busters. While the others bring Jay back to base for a supply of Enetron, they now have to deal with two Messiah Megazords coming in thirty minutes before they are alerted to Beet Buster in the Takehashi district wit Puppetloid intending to sic him on the city if the Go-Busters do not arrive. While the others deal with the Sunadokeizord, with the RH-03 Rabbit captured before the Puppetzord appears and takes control of the GT-02 Gorilla to attack Buster Hercules, Hiromu arrives to the Takenashi district and sends Nick to find Puppetloid while he fights Beet Buster. During their, Red Buster reveals to Beet Buster that Jay told them that his happy go lucky is cover to hide his pain over the deaths of the scientists Messiah absorbed and tells him that he can does not have to shoulder the pain anymore. With Beet Buster unnerved as Red Buster, Nick weeds Puppetloid as Red Buster destroys the right hand. With Beet Buster back to normal, Red Buster assumes Powered Custom mode to finish the Messiah Metaloid off. At that time, things seem bleak for Buster Hercules until a mysterious blue robot lion arrives that cripples the Messiah Megazords to free the GT-02 and RH-03. Go-Buster Ace then arrives with Go-Buster Oh is formed as it and Buster Hercules respectively take out the Puppetzord and the Sunadokeizord. However, the only loose end is the mysterious lion robot as it suddenly attacks the Megazords before leaving.
35	"Roar, Tategami Lioh!"; Transliteration: "Tategami Raiō Hoeru!" (Japanese: タテガミライオー 吼える！)	Kento Shimoyama	October 21, 2012
After the attack by the mysterious lion robot, Kuroki reveals that it is the design of the late Professor Saburo Hazuki, the man who conceived the framework for the Buster Machines. As the Go-Busters track the lion robot to the surrounding foothills, they find Enter going after a young woman. After driving Enter off, the woman reveals herself to be Mika Hazuki, the daughter of Professor Hazuki. She reveals the robot is the Buddyzord LT-06 Tategami Lioh and explains that it wishes to fight the Go-Busters, who she reveals she has a hatred for. Red Buster uses Go-Buster Ace against the robot, but is defeated by Tategami Lioh's Buddy Animal mode, revealing the lion's strength. Still bothered by Mika's words of why she hates the Go-Busters, Ryuji finds Masato as he presents the blueprints for the Buddyzord, a Megazord with the AI of a buddyroid built into it. This inspires Ryuji and Masato to study the blueprints to discover more about it. Later, as Go-Buster Ace gets its rematch with Tategami Lioh, Ryuji confronts Mika about her father's reasons for creating the Buddyzord before Enter intervenes in the plans. Yellow Buster Powered Custom and Stag Buster hold him off while Ryuji and Masato take Mika to another location, revealing that Tategami Lioh is meant to dock with Go-Buster Ace. However, as the docking causes it to assume its true mode, Masato reveals that Tategami Lioh is actually testing Go-Buster Ace for its worth as its partner. As Ryuji and Masato explain that Professor Hazuki's intention was to give the Go-Busters hope, Go-Buster Ace manages to defeat Tategami Lioh and win its loyalty just as Enter appears in the Type Epsilon Megazord to attack both Megazords. After Tategami Lioh gives Go-Buster Ace an edge with its Buddy Vehicle mode, it requests Red Buster to personally pilot it as they destroy the Type Epsilon Megazord together. Emerging from Tategami Lioh, Hiromu appears with the Buddyzord's control system which was created from digitized copy of Professor's mind who thanks his daughter for looking after Tategami Lioh. With Mika's blessings, the Go-Busters take Tategami Lioh as their new ally.
36	"Go-Buster Lioh, Kaching!"; Transliteration: "Gōbasutā Raiō Gagīn!" (Japanese: ゴ―バスターライオーガギーン！)	Kento Shimoyama	October 28, 2012
The buddyroids finished their maintenance, after the Go-Busters were dealing with Escape when she picked a fight to see their Powered Custom abilities firsthand, and talking about something to do with their partners. But when Ryuji and Yoko shirk them off, Usada Lettuce and Gorisaki Banana jump the gun that Tategami Lioh is getting better treatment than them. They then form a buddyroid Workers' Union to discuss the matter, with Cheeda Nick purposely getting Beet J. Stag involved on the hopes of sabotaging the movement. But when their demands are refused, Jay advises Usada and Gorisaki to go on strike. This complicates things as the Lio Attache alerts to Messiah Card 05 creating Bulldozerloid in the Sagami district, revealing it to be more helpful than the buddyroids at the moment. This forces Gorisaki and Usada to steal the Lio Attache with Nick sent after them while the Go-Busters deal with Bulldozerloid. But when the Messiah Metaloid overpowers them, the Go-Busters learn they cannot use Powered Custom. At that time, not coming to Hiromu's aid in order to talk sense in Usada and Gorisaki, Nick convinces them that Tategami Lioh is lonely and they should be friends with it as the Lio Attache warns them that Ryuji and Yoko's weak points are taking effect. Arriving with their well being their utmost concern, Usada and Gorisaki make up with their partners before the Go-Busters assume their Powered Custom modes as Escape arrives. While the others deal with Bulldozerloid, Blue Buster deals with Escape before forcing to fall back her weapons are destroyed and her data damaged. But when Bulldozerloid proves too durable to be defeated in unarmed combat, Red Buster uses the Lio Attache's Lio Blaster mode to finish the Messiah Metaloid off as the Bulldozerzord appears with Ryuji asking permission for the GT-02 and the RH-03 to deployed with Tategami Lioh to form Go-Buster Lioh to destroy the Type Delta Megazord. Soon after, as Masato beats Jay for causing the strike, Ryuji and Yoko apologize to their buddyroids as Nick is down in the dumps when he is being left out of the moment after what Usada and Gorisaki put him through.
37	"The Black and White Brides"; Transliteration: "Kuro to Shiro no Hanayome" (Japanese: 黒と白の花嫁)	Yasuko Kobayashi	November 4, 2012
While thinking of Enter and his use of the Messiah Metaloids could be to destroy Messiah for whatever agenda he has, Escape decides to take matters in her own hands to ensure Messiah does evolve. Escape takes her to a church where a Messiah Card assimilated a bridal tiara. Alerted, the Go-Busters arrive to the church to find the bride running off due to Tiaraloid extracting the girl's digitized love. When Beet Buster and Stag Buster arrive, Escape interferes to keep them from destroying Tiaraloid as she ruins more weddings across the city before the Messiah Metaloid completely escapes detection. As the Go-Busters debate while told they have 19 hours until the Messiah Megazord appears, Yoko remembers the wedding of her teacher Mamoru Hasagawa. Elsewhere, having hooked herself up to her tablet, Escape is confronted by Enter who questions her meddling before allowing her to continue upon seeing her resolve. The next day, Yoko introduces the others to Mr. Hasagawa, who agrees to help weed out Tiaraloid despite Ryuji and Commander Kuroki's overall objection. They enact the fake wedding a few more times before Escape enters the church in a black bridal gown as she guns down the reception while luring the Go-Busters away to fight her. After the Go-Busters transform, Escape battles them as Red Buster is forced to leave to engage the Tiarazord with Go-Buster Ace and Tategami Lioh. As Go-Buster Ace and Tategami Lioh manage to take out the Tiarazord, Escape takes a blow meant for Tiaraloid as Messiah partially emerges, revealing her upgraded form: Escape Evolve. As Yellow Buster becomes Yellow Buster Powered Custom to combat Escape Evolve, the other Go-Busters deal with Tiaraloid before she is destroyed by Blue Buster Powered Custom. With Escape caught off guard, she is hit by Yellow Buster and forced to escape. Later, after Mr. Hasagawa's wedding went without, Yoko admits that maybe he was not her true first love after hearing Escape's resolve and devotion to Messiah and resolves to one day find the one she truly loves.
38	"Live! Ace Deathmatch"; Transliteration: "Jikkyō! Ēsu Desumatchi" (Japanese: 実況！エースデスマッチ)	Yasuko Kobayashi	November 11, 2012
With the others too busy, Ryuji studying Tategami Lioh's stats, Masato is dismayed that no one wants to join him for the MMA's A Different Kind Martial Arts Top Decisive Battle tournament. The group are then alerted to a Messiah Metaloid detected with multiple Megazords being instantly teleported to its location, the Higashi District East Dome where the martial arts tournament takes place. While the others hunt down the Metaloid, Go-Buster Ace confronts the first of the Messiah Megazords before it and its opponent are sucked into the stadium. Within, Hiromu and Nick learn they are in a pocket dimension called the Vaglass Dome and must engage the Messiah Megazord known as Domezord Alpha in a Megazord Deathmatch. Despite the Go-Busters' attempts, they neither reach Hiromu nor break into the stadium before seeing a live broadcast fighting Domezord Alpha with Enter as the commentary while revealing that this fight is to analyze Go-Buster Ace's data. Though Go-Buster Ace destroys Domezord Alpha with a lariat, Enter explains that Hiromu cannot leave the Battlespace until Go-Buster Ace defeats the remaining three. Within second, Go-Buster Ace is pitted against the tag-team duo Domezord Beta and Domezord Gamma before managing to get the latter to take out its teammate. After a failed attempt to sneak on a summoned Domezord Delta, Blue Buster and Yellow Buster assume Powered Custom mode to take out Buglers alongside Beet Buster and Stag Buster. Hearing that Tategami Lioh wants to help, now knowing the location of the Messiah Metaloid from their failed infiltration, Ryuji has an idea based on his researching earlier. With the Domezords overpowering Go-Buster Ace with their underhanded tag team, and Hiromu at his limits, Enter tells the two to stop as he asks Red Buster if he wants to give up. But when Red Buster refuses to throw the towel despite the odds, Go-Buster Ace gets its second wind as Tategami Lioh and the Buster Machines arrive outside the stadium and combine into Go-Buster King to force the dome to release the Battlespace's fighters while assuming his true form: Domeloid. After taking out the Domezords, Go-Buster King overwhelms Domeloid and letting Go-Buster Ace get payback with a flying lariat before Go-Buster King finishes the Messiah Metaloid off. With only eight Messiah Cards left, a frustrated Enter leaves.
39	"Finishing Blow! Messiah's Fist"; Transliteration: "Hissatsu! Mesaia no Kobushi" (Japanese: 必殺！メサイアの拳)	Yasuko Kobayashi	November 18, 2012
While reviewing a blog posting of a Messiah Card sighting, the Go-Busters get a lead as their investigation takes them to a karate dojo in the Renbu district where they find unconscious martial artists and the boy who reported the card. The boy, named Kenta Sawai, attempts to flee when Yoko stops him and he denies knowing anything. By then, Enter arrives and calls in Buglers to fight them while referring to Kenta as his majesty. With Red Buster holding Enter at bay, Blue Buster finds Kenta defeating the Buglers before he runs away. Ryuji finds the boy and watches over him, waiting for the GT-02 to arrive, and he wins Kenta over by confirming the boy's dream to become an engineer. However, Kenta wants to prove himself to his father first so he can pursue his dream. Ryuji is then contacted by Hiromu who tells him the Messiah Card has fused into the boy's karate gloves. When Ryuji attempts to get Kenta to take the gloves off, Messiah takes over the boy's body as he proceeds to have everyone fight him to gather data. The other Go-Busters hold off Escape Evolve while Ryuji takes a beating as tries to reach through to Kenta, who manages to regain control of his body from Messiah. This forces the Messiah Card to use a nearby Enetron tank to become Karateloid as Ryuji becomes Blue Buster Powered Custom to fight him just as his Weakpoint takes effect. In the other fight, Enter spirits Escape away just as the Karatezord arrives. Go-Buster Ace and Buster Hercules battle the Megazord, ultimately destroying it, while Yellow Buster arrives to Ryuji's side and finishes the weakened Karateloid off. Later, Kenta earns his father's blessing to pursue his dream by showing him his new resolve.
40	"Covering Jay and the Messiahloid"; Transliteration: "Kaburu Jei to Mesaiaroido" (Japanese: カブるＪとメサイアロイド)	Yasuko Kobayashi	November 25, 2012
While revealing the events of how the Megazords are still being teleported, the Go-Busters learn that Hyper Space is becoming unstable. When Escape creates Parabolaloid 2 in the Banshu District to help her find the remaining Messiah Cards, the Go-Busters are alerted to the Megazord appearing within two minutes. As Go-Buster Ace and Go-Buster Lioh take out Parabolazord 2, Escape is confronted by Enter as he is revealed to have absorbed a Messiah Card before Parabolaloid 2 leaves to find the Messiah Card he detects in the Kakino District. However, upon finding it, Messiah Card 07 infects Parabolaloid 2 and upgrades him into a pseudo-Messiah Metaloid. The Go-Buster fight Parabolaloid 2 before Jay comes to the possessed Metaloid's aid. As Kuroki talks to Masato of the turn of events, Jay attempts to take the Messiah Card from Parabolaloid 2 by force. The fight attracting the attention of the Go-Busters as they arrive, forced to conjure Masato's avatar, Jay reveals that Masato's transport in Hyper Space was incomplete with some of his data absorbed by Messiah. Realizing that Jay is acting to have him fully return to his world, Masato beats sense into him while telling him that he'll think of a way to return without his data. Joining the Go-Busters, Beet Buster and Stag Buster hold Parabolaloid 2 at bay as the Go-Busters assume Powered Custom to finish the Messiah Metaloid off. However, Enter arrives and reveals his Enter Unite form. Defeating the Go-Busters, Enter proceeds to extract the Messiah Card from Parabolaloid 2 before leaving the downgraded Metaloid to be easily destroyed. Later, the Go-Busters talk about Masato's resolve and Jay's loyalty to Masato.
41	"The Thief Pink Buster!"; Transliteration: "Kaitō Pinku Basutā!" (Japanese: 怪盗ピンクバスター！)	Nobuhiro Mouri	December 2, 2012
Alerted to a Messiah Card, the Go-Busters learn it has ended up in the hands of a man in the Akechi district who has locked it away in a safe and will give it to them for 10 million yen. However, a mysterious girl appears and steals Messiah Card 10 before leaving as quickly as she arrived, leaving behind her calling card that reads "Thief Pink Buster". The Go-Busters pursue, with Pink Buster eluding them before Buglers appear. As the Go-Busters deal with the Buglers, with Red Buster pleading with Pink Buster to give them the Messiah Card, Pink Buster sees all the Buglers arrive and she runs off with Red Buster in pursuit. As dawn breaks, Red Buster loses sight of Pink Buster as a young woman passes by him. Later, while getting intel on Pink Buster, the Go-Busters are alerted to a new Messiah Metaloid emerging in the Akechi district. As the others find Loupeloid as the man who had the Messiah Card is giving away his things, Hiromu is confronted by Pink Buster as he discovers she is the woman he saw before: Reika Saotome. Taking his Morphin Brace, Pink Buster forces Hiromu to help her with a job with the promise that she will give it back to him along with what appears to be Messiah Card 10. Hiromu reluctantly agrees and follows Pink Buster to the Mitsuyama district after visiting various places, and he eventually realizes that Reika is using him to lure in the Messiah Metaloid. Upon confronting her about it, Reika reveals that all she wants to do is to set things right after her theft. By then, Loupeloid arrives at their location and Reika returns the Morphin Brace to Hiromu so he may do battle. With Pink Buster providing back up, Red Buster takes out several Buglers while taking a hit from meant for Pink Buster. Once Blue Buster and Yellow Buster arrive, with Red Buster having Pink Buster promise to give up thieving, the Go-Busters assume their Powered Custom mode to defeat Loupeloid while Buster Hercules and Tategami Lioh destroy the Loupezord. Later, Hiromu gets a letter from Pink Buster that states she cannot honor her promise not to continue her life of crime as she intends to steal his heart.
42	"Attack! Within the Megazord"; Transliteration: "Totsugeki! Megazōdo no Naka e" (Japanese: 突撃！メガゾードの中へ)	Yasuko Kobayashi	December 9, 2012
After Yellow Buster destroys Denshaloid 2 within three minutes before his Megazord counterpart appears, she and the other Go-Busters get into their Buster Machines to face Denshazord 2. However, Enter uses Messiah Card 06 to have Denshazord 2 evolve into Megazordloid with another Megazord arriving. But with the Megazord nowhere to be found, Go-Buster Ace attempts to stop Megazordloid as he escapes into Hyper Space. While the Go-Busters search for their quarry, they learn Megazordloid is abducting despairing humans for their weaknesses with Yoko dragged in while attempting to save a pessimistic youth. With Masato and Jay updated on the turn of events, Hiromu and company reveal their intent to use Nakamura as bait to lure the Messiah Metaloid out into the open. Within Megazordloid, Yoko attempts to cheer the other people up before the Messiah Metaloid stops to send Buglers into him to deal with Yoko. Taking advantage, Buster Beet holds Megazordloid long enough for Red Buster and Blue Buster to enter the Messiah Metaloid as he escapes back into Hyper Space. With Red Buster Powered Custom taking his fight with Enter Unite outside Megazordloid, Blue Buster Powered Custom finds himself Escape Evolve when he arrives in Megazordloid's dynamo. Luckily, thanks to the passengers giving her sweets back to reinvigorate herself, Yellow Buster comes to Blue Buster's aid and assumes Powered Custom mode before destroying Megazordloid's dynamo, the two getting everyone out of the deactivated Messiah Metaloid. However, as Buster Hercules destroys Megazordloid, a Type Delta Megazord emerges from the wreckage as the surviving Messiah Card evolves it into the Type Zeta Megazord as Enter reveals Megazordloid was also analyzing hope to make the turn of events possible. With Escape piloting it, the Type Zeta Megazord overwhelms Buster Hercules and Tategami Lioh with ease. However, as it has yet to fully stabilize, Megazord Zeta but is forced to fall back with Hiromu unnerved that his nightmare of Messiah will become a reality.
43	"Christmas Determination"; Transliteration: "Ketsui no Kurisumasu" (Japanese: 決意のクリスマス)	Yasuko Kobayashi	December 16, 2012
When their search for Megazord Zeta bears no fruit, the Go-Busters help in the Energy Management Center's yearly Christmas preparation at an orphanage in the Dainan district with Hiromu showing more pep than usual. But the next day, as the Go-Busters and their buddyroids arrive to the orphanage, Enter finds two active Messiah Cards and combines the developing Metaloids with the Go-Busters alerted to it attacking the Tōya district. Joined by Beet Buster and Stag Buster, the Go-Busters find the two-in-one Messiah Metaloid Kentateloid as they find their data being extracted by the fused opponent. When Beet Buster reveals that Kentateloid is going after their anger, Enter arrives with Escape as he provokes the Go-Busters with the memory of the events of thirteen years ago. Escape holds Beet Buster and Stag Buster back so Kentateloid can deal with the Go-Busters with the latter fight ending in a stalemate as Messiah begins to manifest in the fused Metaloid. Though Escape told Enter that should merge the Cards in their possession to recreate Messiah, Enter tells her that the evolution of a new Messiah is more interesting and that Escape should reconsider her dependence on the Messiah she knew. Alerted that of the Megazords' arrival within 3 minutes at the Dainan district, Kuroki approves of Hiromu's intent to deal with Kentateloid and has the command center outfitted for Christmas as the Go-Busters get ready for Kentateloid's Megazord counterparts. As Go-Buster Beet leads the charge on the Kenzord and the Tatezord, Red Buster confronts Kentateloid yet does not fight back with Enter perplexed. However, Kuroki reveals that Hiromu is holding back his anger with the music box's jingle bell melody. After telling Enter that anger is not a means to get stronger and that he picked a poor day to pick a fight, with Cheeda Nick deciding to sing Jingle Bells, Red Buster reveals that he purposely took Kentateloid's attacks to counter their fighting style. As Buster Hercules and Tategami Lioh take out the Kenzord and the Tatezord, Red Buster destroys Kentateloid. However, Enter Unite obtains the two Messiah Cards with the intent to use them. But they are taken by Escape to enhance Megazord Zeta. Grabbing Enter and telling him that she will restore Messiah to his former glory, Escape has Megazord Zeta crush him in its hands before turning her attention to the Go-Busters.
44	"Christmas Eve: Time to Complete the Mission"; Transliteration: "Seiya Shimei Hatasu Toki" (Japanese: 聖夜・使命果たすとき)	Yasuko Kobayashi	December 23, 2012
Having killed Enter and intending to do the same with the Go-Busters, Escape battles the Go-Buster Megazords in the enhanced Megazord Zeta as Messiah's conscious surfaces and defeats Go-Buster Ace. After others save a gravely injured Hiromu, leaving despite he intent to continue, Megazord Zeta proceeds to summon ten Megazord models. As the others are better informed over the three waves of Megazords and as Go-Buster Ace is being repaired, a wounded Hiromu attempts to fight his way out of the infirmary before Nick snaps him out of it while telling him that he understands but he must also live. Once repairs are done, the Go-Busters head out to face the first wave of Vaglass Megazord with Nick piloting Go-Buster Ace to give Hiromu time to heal. After the first batch, two Alphas and two Betas, are destroyed as Megazord Zeta joins the fray as Gamma and Delta types arrive. Learning the Zeta-Type is attempting to assimilate the summoned Valgass Megazords, Go-Buster Oh and Buster Hercules destroy the second wave before the final wave, composing of each Megazord of the four main archetype, arrives. Even with the FS-O0 providing aid, Megazord Zeta absorbs the remaining Alpha, Beta, and Gamma types to evolve into the titanic Messiah Reboot. Reabsorbing Escape's data as he has no more need for her, Messiah Reboot overpowers the Go-Buster Megazords and attempt to assimilate the GT-02 and the RH-03 until Red Buster arrives in Tategami Lioh to turn the tides. Even after forming Go-Buster King, with Nick joining Red Buster in the cockpit, the Go-Busters still find themselves at a disadvantage. However, Go-Buster King separates with Go-Buster Lioh impaling Messiah Reboot with the Go-Busters' antivirus which surges through the wound as Messiah is utterly destroyed with the three Go-Busters emerging from the raging inferno. The Go-Busters then celebrate Christmas at Daian orphanage, with Rika arriving and Ryuji learning the teacher was once a resident of the orphanage, Hiromu states that they have reason to fight and live for a better tomorrow. However, elsewhere, Enter manifests and wishes the Go-Busters a Merry Christmas while he is now closer to his evolution into a new Messiah.
45	"Happy New Year: A Small Formidable Enemy, Again"; Transliteration: "Kinga Shinnen Chiisana Kyōteki, Futatabi" (Japanese: 謹賀新年 小さな強敵、再び)	Kento Shimoyama	January 6, 2013
Finding a strange group of Buglers in East district, the Go-Busters take all but two of the grunts as they found Escape's tablet and escape during the fight. With the threat apparently dealt with, as Hiromu sees Rika and learns that she has something important to do, Yoko finds Gorisaki taking Ryuji to see Rena Sato for a blind date. Guilt tripped into it, Ryuji lies of his profession to Rena with Yoko, Masato, and Jay watching incognito. But the spies find Hiromu also in the restaurant as he wanted to know what his sister is doing, all of them joining forces to ensure Ryuji and Rena have a good time as Hiromu tells Morishita not to contact Ryuji no matter what. By that time, at the South district, the Buglers accidentally create a Metaloid with a Vaglass Megazord to arrive in five minutes. The gang decide to take out the threat before Ryuji, who noticed them, to keep him in the dark. As Yoko is grabbed by Ryuji to be his moral support, Red Buster meets with Beet Buster and Stag Buster as they find themselves unknowingly trapped by the tiny Metaloid Omochiloid. When Yellow Buster arrives, knowing he cannot fight the Go-Busters at his present size, Omochiloid latches onto Hiromu as he runs into the restaurant to be Ryuji's wing man. Seeing a change to use the restaurant kitchen to enlarge himself, Omochiloid causes a racket to reach his destination while Buster Hercules deals with the Omochizord. As Tategami Lioh comes to provide back up in destroying the Omochizord with the Lioh Burst, Hiromu learns that he dealing with a small Metaloid like before. Joined by Yellow Buster, Red Buster finds Omochiloid in the kitchen as he uses a stove to enlarge himself to human size and overwhelm the two Go-Busters. When the two starting finding each other and realizing something is going on, Ryuji and Rika emerge from the restaurant after Red Buster assumed Powered Custom to destroy the immobilized Omochiloid. Later, as Hiromu and Nick learn that Rika was actually having a business meeting rather than a date, Ryuji is in the dumps by Rena when she has a boyfriend. With the stress this misadventure brought them, Hiromu decides to go to temple to wish for some peace.
46	"The New Fusion and Overheated Rampage!"; Transliteration: "Arata na Yūgō to Netsu Bōsō!" (Japanese: 新たな融合と熱暴走！)	Yasuko Kobayashi	January 13, 2013
While working out, Hiromu and Cheeda Nick learn that Ryuji is in the dumps because he Yoko does not want his help in picking a high school to attend once their mission is fully over. When they are alerted to a strange Enetron spike in the Okuyama district, Hiromu rides with Ryuji while Nick gives Yoko a ride. Once at the site of the readings, with Ryuji pointing out that it is strange they get an Enetron detection from place without technology, the Go-Busters find Enter and Escape waiting for them as the latter reveals to the former as "Papa Enter". While the others fight the Buglers, Blue Buster learns that Escape does not remember him as she transforms into a flower version of her Escape Evolve form while proceeding to overheat him. As the berserk Blue Buster and Escape fall into the rapids below, Enter overpowers Red Buster Powered Custom yet takes his leave without finishing the human off. Searching for Ryuji, with Beet J. Stag elsewhere looking for his missing stag beetle, Hiromu, Yoko, Jin, and Nick are alerted to Ryuji's Morphin Brace as its owner is still fighting Escape on the beach after he overheated away while attempting to find out why his opponent does not remember him. Though Blue Buster momentarily regained himself to become Blue Buster Powered Custom, Escape overheats him before canceling the Powered Custom transformation. Luckily, Red Buster arrives to hold off Escape while Yellow Buster tries to get Blue Buster into the sea. Though she and Gorisaki Banana are wounded, remembering how Ryuji has always been there for her, Yoko apologizes to Ryuji as she grabs him while failing into the sea. As the RH-03 retrieves them, with Red Buster, Beet Buster, and Stag Buster fighting Escape, Yellow Buster leaps into the air supported by Blue Buster to finish Escape off with the Lio Blaster. However, impressed with Go-Busters' win, Enter reveals his new ability to merge organic life forms and inorganic material by creating both Kuwagataloid from Jay's missing stag beetle and another data clone of Escape.
47	"Reset and Back-Up"; Transliteration: "Risetto to Bakkuappu" (Japanese: リセットとバックアップ)	Yasuko Kobayashi	January 20, 2013
Able to convert insects and plants into Metaloids, Enter reveals he won the game as he became the new Messiah and that he obtained the Messiah Metaloids' gathered data. Tired of waiting, Escape and Kuwagataloid proceed to fight the others while Enter reveals he will eventually be able to assimilate higher life forms as part of his goal to become the ideal human through Hiromu's data. When he suddenly exposes Hiromu's Weakpoint, the Go-Busters are forced fall back with Enter allowing them to escape. With Enter now knowing his Weakpoint, despite the impossibility behind it, Hiromu resolves to overcome it by any means. But the attempts prove futile as Masato talks to Ryuji and Yoko about Enter and Escape having backups that may be tied to the final Messiah Card. Coming to, Hiromu suggests a change of approaching his Weakpoint. The next day, responding to Kuwagataloid calling them out in the Rindo district, the Go-Busters head out with Beet J. Stag begrudgingly going after the Kuwagatazord. After destroying Escape and creating a new one, Enter has her and Kuwagataloid battle the Go-Busters. With the others inflicting damage to him whenever his Weakpoint was used by the enemy and had nearly completely froze him, Red Buster is able to nullify his weakness and becomes Red Buster Powered Custom so he and Beet Buster can destroy the Organic Metaloid with the Volcanic Beet Slash attack. Joining the SJ-05's fight against Kuwagatazord, Go-Buster Ace, Go-Buster Beet, and Tategami Lioh work together to destroy the enemy Megazord. During their fight with Escape, Blue Buster and Yellow Buster assumed their Powered Custom modes to put the data replica out of her misery. Taking offense to Red Buster insulting his desire to become human, Enter transforms and tells his opponent that they are two sides of the same coin before allowing himself to be destroyed. Later, as Jay is relieved to find his stag beetle in his pocket the entire time, the handle bar Hiromu touched transformed into Enter. Enter than reveals that Hiromu is his back-up, and he is the host of the final Messiah Card.
48	"Setting the Trap"; Transliteration: "Shikakerareteita Wana" (Japanese: 仕掛けられていた罠)	Yasuko Kobayashi	January 27, 2013
Explaining how Hiromu is his back up, Enter reveals that he implanted Messiah Card 13 inside Red Buster. The card is revealed to have been retrieving data of the other Messiah Cards gathered and is programmed to recreate Enter upon the time of his destruction while copying Hiromu's data in the process. As a result, the only way he can be defeated is with Hiromu's death. As the others confirm Enter's words, Hiromu takes this revelation hard as it effects his training and now understanding why Enter has been easy on him. Putting up a front as Yoko tells him the others are trying to find a way to get the card out of him, Hiromu resolves that the only way to defeat Enter is to face him and escapes the Energy Management Center. Elsewhere, Enter creates a new more aggressive Escape by fusing a snake into her data make up. But seeing that restoring her original mindset impossible as her data is beyond corruption, Enter leaves to Escape to her devices as she proceeds to assimilate various animals into her being. The next day at the Kindai district, luring Enter with an attempted suicide, Hiromu transforms and assumes Powered Custom mode to fight him in battle to the death. But because of the Messiah Card in Hiromu gives him a bit of his host's data with each recreating, Enter can mimic Red Buster's fighting style as he intends to put his back up in a coma. Elsewhere, the other Go-Busters run into Escape as she assumes her monstrous Evolve Animal Unite Form to attack them. Though they manage to overpower her, Escape assimilate the surrounding matter to become Escape Zeta as Go-Buster King is formed to fight her. Motivated to put her out of her misery, the Go-Busters destroy Escape Zeta with Blue Buster giving Escape peace of mind as she is deleted for good. Arriving to the site of his fight with Enter, they find Red Buster making his move to destroy both himself and Enter in the flames of his Volcanic Attack unless the latter removes the Messiah Card from him. Impressed, Enter responds by intensifying the inferno with his own flame with Red Buster canceling his Powered Custom to save Nick. When the dust clears, Hiromu emerges from the cables Enter encased him in as Enter revives himself. Explaining how more powerful he has now become as his face briefly morphed into Hiromu, Enter says "Let's Morphin'" and the Go-Busters transformation sound is heard as the team looks on in shock.
49	"Preparation and Selection"; Transliteration: "Kakugo to Sentaku" (Japanese: 覚悟と選択)	Yasuko Kobayashi	February 3, 2013
Explaining how more powerful he has now become from copying Hiromu's data through the final Messiah Card with each demise and recreation, Enter transforms into a parody of Red Buster: Dark Buster. Now beyond the primary Go-Busters' ability to destroy with Powered Custom mode with an understanding of the human spirit and confidence that will soon have the power to change the world in his image, Dark Buster proceeds to overpower the five before taking his leave while telling them that the best is yet to come. After the others scold him for being reckless in trying to handle the Messiah Card on his own. When Ryuji promises to kill Hiromu if needed and Yoko having faith they can save him, Hiromu thanks them as he entrusts them with his life. Eventually, the group learns that Enter merged into an Enetron tank to convert it into a cocoon. But once inside to find survivors, the primary Go-Busters find most of the humans being assimilated into the building's structure with only two children spared. Enter reveals his evolution is nearly complete as the primary Go-Busters take the kids when Buglers manifest. Once the Buglers are dealt with, the primary members are called that Masato reveals that they are going into Hyper Space through Hangar 4 for a risky gambit that could remove the card from the Hiromu. However they are unaware that the process will likely also destroy Masato's physical body. Knowing the risk as Hyper Space is unstable since Messiah's defeat in the dimension, the Go-Busters resolve to take Enter with them to finish things with him there. As Go-Buster Oh and Buster Hercules are formed, Enter has the cocoon transform into Megazord Omega as it proceeds to assimilate the surrounding thirteen Enetron tanks to begin his. Though, Enter is knocked in Hangar 4 as he realizes their proceeds to tear the Energy Management Center apart. But with Tategami Lioh joining the fray, the Go-Busters' Megazords hold Megazord Omega long enough for all five Megazords to be transported into the unstable Hyper Space. While the Go-Busters are unconscious, Enter surveys the dying landscape with the intent to return to reality.
50 (Final)	"Eternal Bonds"; Transliteration: "Eien no Kizuna" (Japanese: 永遠のキズナ)	Yasuko Kobayashi	February 10, 2013
Arriving in a collapsing Hyper Space, the Go-Busters check-in. All the Go-Busters arrived safely, and all Buddy Machines but Tategami Lioh are accounted for. When Dark Buster Enter attacks Hiromu and Yoko, Masato and Jay take off for the hangar, as Jay tells the others to meet him there. Enter appears to have the upper hand, until Ryuji arrives in GT-02 and uses the banana missiles to bury Enter in an avalanche. The Go-Busters make their way to the hangar, where Masato reveals his plan. Since the data from Masato's body that Enter has on Messiah Card 07 is backed up on Messiah Card 13 in Hiromu, they can digitize Hiromu and transmit the data on Card 13 to Masato's body. Like magnets, the body data will want to return to its natural body, dragging the card with it. However, Jay breaks down and explains that an infusion of that much data to Masato's unstable body will destroy him. Masato confirms this, but says the card would also be destroyed as well, removing Enter's backup and allowing for his destruction. The other Go-Busters don't want to sacrifice him, but he passionately pleads with them, as they don't have another plan that would work before Enter took over the real world. They agree, and Hiromu enters the transport chamber as Yoko, Ryuji, and the buddyroids go to hold off Enter. Yoko and Usada and Ryuji and Gorisaki combine as Powered Custom, while Jay transforms into Stag Buster and Nick simply fights in his humanoid form. Masato's impassioned plead to Jay to help him protect the “fascinating world” inspires Jay to hold Enter off. The transport process completes, and as they expected, Card 13 traveled to Masato's body and was then destroyed with it, though his avatar can hold together a while longer. The destruction of Card 13 cancels Enter's Dark Buster mode, and he furiously returns to the Omega Megazord. Tategami Lioh arrives, and the Go-Busters throw all their combinations at the Megazord, but to no effect as Enter still has all the data on them. Hiromu realizes they need to use a tactic Enter has never seen, and directs Nick to transfer all their Enetron to the legs. This gives Go-Buster Ace Hiromu's ability of fast transport, which catches Enter off-guard, and lets Buster Hercules and Go-Buster King finish the Megazord off. Enter escapes to the ground, and he and the Go-Busters have their final battle. Enter uses his dark version of the Volcanick Attack, but the Go-Busters counter with the new Volcanick All Busters Attack, which overwhelms and destroys him. Masato's avatar dissolves, and the exhausted Go-Busters collapse, resigned to be destroyed as the Hyper Space collapses around them. But Hiromu's father and Masato appear in the sky, urging the Go-Busters to press on, and instructing the buddyroids to take them to Masato's hangar to escape. Enter's cocoons in the real world shut down, and the people inside return to normal, but the staff at the EMC are saddened as they see the Hyper Space collapse with no word from the Go-Busters. But they are then relieved as a signal comes through from Hiromu, as the surviving Go-Busters are returning from Hyper Space. A short time later, they celebrate Yoko's getting into high school again. Ryuji becomes an engineer, with Gorisaki as his assistant. Jay has designated himself the overseer of the forest, and wears the black Jenga block around his neck in memory of Masato. Nick and Hiromu stand on the same bridge they first drove across at the beginning of the series, and Nick asks Hiromu what's next. Hiromu says he doesn't know, and that he has 13 years of thinking to make up for. Nick says he'll stay with Hiromu wherever he goes, and the two drive off into the sunset.
