= Fuuka Nishihira =

Japanese actress (born 1992)

- 西平 風香
- Born: 11 January 1992 (age 34); Kanagawa Prefecture, Japan
- Occupation: Actress
- Years active: 2009–2017
- Height: 160 cm (5 ft 3 in)
- Website: Official website

Fuuka Nishihira (西平 風香, Nishihira Fūka; born 11 January 1992, in Kanagawa Prefecture) is a Japanese actress. Until 2016, she was represented by Platinum Production.

== Biography ==
Nishihira entered the entertainment industry in 2009, after being scouted by Platinum Production. In March 2010, Nishihira was included in Miss Magazine's Best 16 of 2010.

== Filmography ==
=== Films ===
Year	Title	Role
2009	Kaki "Hibiki × Momoko-hen"	Hiroko Watanabe
2012	Kamen Rider × Super Sentai: Super Hero Taisen	Miho Nakamura
2012	Tokumei Sentai Go-Busters the Movie: Protect the Tokyo Enetower!	Miho Nakamura
2013	Tokumei Sentai Go-Busters vs. Kaizoku Sentai Gokaiger: The Movie	Miho Nakamura
2013	Kamen Rider × Super Sentai × Space Sheriff: Super Hero Taisen Z	Miho Nakamura
2015	Strobe Edge	
2015	Shiromajo Gakuen	Misaki Tachibana

=== TV dramas ===
Year	Title	Role	Network
2010	Tensou Sentai Goseiger		TV Asahi
2010	Q10	Kyoko Shibata	NTV
2011	Misaki Number One!	Akako Makino	NTV
2011	Ariadne no Dangan	Miho Sato	KTV
2012	Tokumei Sentai Go-Busters	Miho Nakamura	TV Asahi
2012	Future Diary		Fuji TV
2013	49		NTV
2014	Shinigami-kun		TV Asahi
2015	Flowers for Algernon	Rin	TBS
2016	Keiji 7-ri: Dai 2 Series	Yuri Shinada	TV Asahi

=== Stage ===
Year	Title	Role
2013	Conten Club –image 7–	
2013	Pochittona. -Switching On Summer-	Eiki Hasegawa
2015	Shin Bakumatsu Junjō-den	Soko Okita

=== Direct-to-video ===
Year	Title	Role
2010	Satsujin Dōga Death Tube 2	Nishidori
2011	2-Channel no Noroi Vol. 2 "Akai Heya"	Miho Otani
2011	Hontōha Kikitakunai! Yama no Kowai Hanashi: Sono 2 "Jinja"	Chika
2013	Tokumei Sentai Go-Busters Returns vs. Dōbutsu Sentai Go-Busters	Miho Nakamura

=== Internet ===
Year	Title	Role
2012	Net Movie: Kamen Rider × Super Sentai: Super Hero Taihen: Who Is the Culprit?!	Miho Nakamura

=== Other TV programmes ===
Year	Title	Network
2011	Nippon Dai Joyū Densetsu 2	TBS
2013	Tabiniro. Tabi Bijin e no Tegami	Fuji TV
2013	Music Dragon	NTV
2015	Omokuri Kantoku: O-Creator's TV show	Fuji TV

=== Television advertisements ===
Year	Title
2010	McDonald's "Coke glass Campaign"
2010	Narita International Airport Corporation "World Sky Gate_Narita"
2010	Tokyu Corporation "Ano Machi e, Tokyu-sen de."
2010	Fancl "Calolimit"
2010	Disney Interactive Studio "Motto! Stitch! DS Rhythm de Rakugaki Dai Sakusen"
2010	Kawaijuku "2010-Nendo Tōki Chokuzen Kōshū"
2011	Osaka Gas "Uchi no Energy o Hybrid e."
2013	Kao Corporation "Flare Fragrance"
2013	Plenus Hotto Motto "Butaniku to Yasai no Stamina Itame Bentō"
2014	At Home
2014	QTNet "BBIQ"

=== Video games ===
Year	Title	Role
2012	Tokumei Sentai Go-Busters	Miho Nakamura

=== Advertising ===
Title
belleVie Akasaka ".bellevie Christmas"

=== Music videos ===
Year	Title
2010	arisa "Kizuna"
2012	Bump of Chicken "Good Luck"
