= Tokumei Sentai Go-Busters =

Japanese tokusatsu TV series

- Title card for Tokumei Sentai Go-Busters
- Genre: Tokusatsu; Superhero fiction Science fiction Action/Adventure; Drama; Cyberpunk
- Created by: Toei
- Written by: Yasuko Kobayashi; Kento Shimoyama; Nobuhiro Mouri
- Directed by: Takayuki Shibasaki; Hiroyuki Kato; Shojiro Nakazawa; Noboru Takemoto; Kenzō Maihara; Katsuya Watanabe; Hiroshi Butsuda; Osamu Kaneda
- Starring: Katsuhiro Suzuki; Ryoma Baba; Arisa Komiya; Hiroya Matsumoto; Naoto Takahashi; Fuuka Nishihira; Shou Jinnai; Ayame Misaki; Hideo Sakaki
- Voices of: Yuichi Nakamura; Keiji Fujiwara; Tesshō Genda; Tatsuhisa Suzuki
- Narrated by: Shoo Munakata
- Opening theme: "Busters Ready Go!" by Hideyuki Takahashi (Project.R); "Morphin! Movin! Busters Ship!" by Hideyuki Takahashi (Project.R)
- Ending theme: "Kizuna ~ Go-Busters!!" by Nazo no Shin Unit Starmen; "One wish, One day" by Katsuhiro Suzuki & Keiji Fujiwara; "Shinpai Honey ♥ Bunny" by Arisa Komiya & Tatsuhisa Suzuki; "Blue Banana Moon" by Ryoma Baba & Tesshō Genda
- Composer: Megumi Ōhashi
- Country of origin: Japan
- No. of episodes: 50 (list of episodes)

Production
- Producers: Motoi Sasaki (TV Asahi); Naomi Takebe; Go Wakamatsu (Toei); Koichi Yada (Toei Agency); Akihiro Fukada (Toei Agency)
- Production location: Tokyo, Japan (Greater Tokyo Area)
- Running time: 24–25 minutes
- Production companies: TV Asahi; Toei Company; Toei Agency

Original release
- Network: TV Asahi
- Release: February 26, 2012 – February 10, 2013

Related
- Kaizoku Sentai Gokaiger; Zyuden Sentai Kyoryuger

Tokumei Sentai Go-Busters (特命戦隊ゴーバスターズ, Tokumei Sentai Gōbasutāzu; Special Operations Squadron Go-Busters) is a Japanese tokusatsu television series and the 36th entry in Toei Company's Super Sentai metaseries, following Kaizoku Sentai Gokaiger. Its theme is based on spy movies and cyber technology on February 26, 2012 on TV Asahi, joining Kamen Rider Fourze and then Kamen Rider Wizard as a program featured in TV Asahi's Super Hero Time programming block. It aired from February 26, 2012 to February 10, 2013, replacing Kaizoku Sentai Gokaiger and was replaced by Zyuden Sentai Kyoryuger.

Some of the villains are designed by Yutaka Izubuchi; marking his return to Super Sentai character design after 1986's Choushinsei Flashman.

Tokumei Sentai Go-Busters began airing in South Korea in 2013 as Power Rangers Go-Busters. In the United States, Tokumei Sentai Go-Busters was adapted as Power Rangers Beast Morphers; the first episode premiered on March 2, 2019. Beast Morphers was to be produced by Saban Brands but, on July 2, 2018, Hasbro would acquire all of the former company's entertainment assets, including the Power Rangers franchise.

== Plot ==
Thirteen years ago in the New Common Era (新西暦, Shinseireki) calendar, the computer controlling the newly discovered energy source called Enetron (エネトロン, Enetoron) was infected by a virus that caused it to create the evil energy being known as Messiah, who wishes to take over mankind and create a world made for machines. Though sent into Hyper Space by the scientists' sacrifice, Messiah's actions established the formation of the Energy Management Center's Special Ops Unit from three children who were caught in the crossfire, the Go-Busters, and their Buddyroids. (Note: The Go-Busters' partner robots are also commonly referred to as Buddy Roids or Buddyroids.) In the present, 2012 NCE, a mysterious figure named Enter leads a group called Vaglass on incursions to gather enough Enetron to bring Messiah back. However, training for this day, the Go-Busters and their Buddyroids are deployed to combat Vaglass's Metaroids and Megazords to protect the city's Enetron from them. Later joined by Masato Jin and his Buddyroid Beet J. Stag, the Go-Busters' resolve is strengthened once they learn the true nature of their enemy and the horrors that would result should Messiah enter their world.

== Episodes ==
Each episode of Go-Busters is called a "Mission".

| No. | Title | Written by | Original release date |
|---|---|---|---|
| 1 | "Special Ops Sentai, Assemble!"; Transliteration: "Tokumei Sentai, Shūketsu seyo!" (Japanese: 特命戦隊、集結せよ！) | Yasuko Kobayashi | February 26, 2012 |
| 2 | "A Promise Made 13 Years Ago"; Transliteration: "Jū-san Nen Mae no Yakusoku" (Japanese: 13年前の約束) | Yasuko Kobayashi | March 4, 2012 |
| 3 | "GT-02 Animal, Deploy!"; Transliteration: "Jī Tī Zero Tsū Animaru, Shutsugeki!" (Japanese: GT-02アニマル、出撃！) | Yasuko Kobayashi | March 11, 2012 |
| 4 | "Special Ops and Determination"; Transliteration: "Tokumei to Ketsui" (Japanese: 特命と決意) | Yasuko Kobayashi | March 18, 2012 |
| 5 | "Dangerous Overheated Rampage!"; Transliteration: "Kiken na Netsu Bōsō!" (Japanese: キケンな熱暴走！) | Yasuko Kobayashi | March 25, 2012 |
| 6 | "Combine! Go-Buster-King"; Transliteration: "Gattai! Gōbasutāō" (Japanese: 合体！ゴーバスターオー) | Yasuko Kobayashi | April 1, 2012 |
| 7 | "Bad Maintenance on the Ace?!"; Transliteration: "Ēsu Seibi Furyō?!" (Japanese: エース整備不良?!) | Nobuhiro Mouri | April 8, 2012 |
| 8 | "Protect the Machine Blueprints!"; Transliteration: "Mashin Sekkeizu o Mamore!" (Japanese: マシン設計図を守れ！) | Yasuko Kobayashi | April 15, 2012 |
| 9 | "Usada Recovery Strategy!"; Transliteration: "Usada Dakkan Sakusen!" (Japanese: ウサダ奪還作戦！) | Yasuko Kobayashi | April 22, 2012 |
| 10 | "The Reason We Fight"; Transliteration: "Tatakau Riyū" (Japanese: 戦う理由) | Yasuko Kobayashi | April 29, 2012 |
| 11 | "The Targeted Weakpoint"; Transliteration: "Nerawareta Uīkupointo" (Japanese: ねらわれたウイークポイント) | Kento Shimoyama | May 6, 2012 |
| 12 | "You Like Going Undercover?"; Transliteration: "Hensō wa Osuki?" (Japanese: 変装はお好き？) | Nobuhiro Mouri | May 13, 2012 |
| 13 | "A Surprising Day Off"; Transliteration: "Sapuraizu na Kyūjitsu" (Japanese: サプライズな休日) | Yasuko Kobayashi | May 20, 2012 |
| 14 | "Ça va? Rescue Strategy"; Transliteration: "Saba? Kyūshutsu Sakusen" (Japanese: サバ？救出作戦) | Yasuko Kobayashi | May 27, 2012 |
| 15 | "The Golden Warrior and the Silvery Buddy"; Transliteration: "Kin no Senshi to Gin no Badi" (Japanese: 金の戦士と銀のバディ) | Yasuko Kobayashi | June 3, 2012 |
| 16 | "The Man Who Came From Hyper Space"; Transliteration: "Akūkan kara Kita Otoko" (Japanese: 亜空間から来た男) | Yasuko Kobayashi | June 10, 2012 |
| 17 | "Its Name Is Go-Buster Beet!"; Transliteration: "Sono Na wa Gōbasutā Bīto!" (Japanese: その名はゴーバスタービート！) | Yasuko Kobayashi | June 17, 2012 |
| 18 | "Cooperative Operations 3,000 Meters In the Earth"; Transliteration: "Chitei Sanzen Mētoru no Kyōdō Sagyō" (Japanese: 地底3000メートルの共同作業) | Nobuhiro Mouri | June 24, 2012 |
| 19 | "My Combination! Buster Hercules"; Transliteration: "Ore no Gattai! Basutā Herakuresu" (Japanese: 俺の合体！バスターヘラクレス) | Kento Shimoyama | July 1, 2012 |
| 20 | "Five-Part Concentration! Great Go-Buster!"; Transliteration: "Gotai Kesshū! Gurēto Gōbasutā!" (Japanese: 5体結集！グレートゴーバスター！) | Yasuko Kobayashi | July 8, 2012 |
| 21 | "Farewell, Blue Buster"; Transliteration: "Saraba Burū Basutā" (Japanese: さらば ブルーバスター) | Yasuko Kobayashi | July 15, 2012 |
| 22 | "The Beautiful Avatar: Escape"; Transliteration: "Utsukushiki Abatā Esukeipu" (Japanese: 美しきアバター エスケイプ) | Yasuko Kobayashi | July 22, 2012 |
| 23 | "Those Who Follow Their Intent"; Transliteration: "Ishi o Tsugu Mono" (Japanese: 意志を継ぐ者) | Yasuko Kobayashi | July 29, 2012 |
| 24 | "A très bien Summer Festival"; Transliteration: "Torebian na Natsu Matsuri" (Japanese: トレビアンな夏祭り) | Nobuhiro Mouri | August 5, 2012 |
| 25 | "Pursue the Mystery of the Avatars!"; Transliteration: "Abatā no Nazo o Oe!" (Japanese: アバターの謎を追え！) | Yasuko Kobayashi | August 12, 2012 |
| 26 | "The Tiny Enemy! Control Room SOS"; Transliteration: "Chiisana Kyōteki! Shireishitsu Esu Ō Esu" (Japanese: 小さな強敵！司令室SOS) | Kento Shimoyama | August 19, 2012 |
| 27 | "An Out of Control Combo to Escape the Labyrinth!"; Transliteration: "Bōsō Konbi de Meikyū Dasshutsu!" (Japanese: 暴走コンビで迷宮脱出！) | Nobuhiro Mouri | August 26, 2012 |
| 28 | "Beware of Chickens!"; Transliteration: "Niwatori ni Chūi seyo!" (Japanese: ニワトリに注意せよ！) | Yasuko Kobayashi | September 2, 2012 |
| 29 | "Breaking Into Hyper Space!"; Transliteration: "Akūkan e no Totsunyū!" (Japanese: 亜空間への突入！) | Yasuko Kobayashi | September 9, 2012 |
| 30 | "Messiah Shutdown"; Transliteration: "Mesaia Shattodaun" (Japanese: メサイアシャットダウン) | Yasuko Kobayashi | September 16, 2012 |
| 31 | "Space Sheriff Gavan Arrives!"; Transliteration: "Uchū Keiji Gyaban, Arawaru!" (Japanese: 宇宙刑事ギャバン、現る！) | Kento Shimoyama | September 23, 2012 |
| 32 | "Friendship Tag With Gavan!"; Transliteration: "Gyaban to no Yūjō Taggu!" (Japanese: ギャバンとの友情タッグ！) | Kento Shimoyama | September 30, 2012 |
| 33 | "Morphin! Powered Custom"; Transliteration: "Mōfin! Pawādo Kasutatamu" (Japanese: モーフィン！パワードカスタム) | Yasuko Kobayashi | October 7, 2012 |
| 34 | "The Enemy Is Beet Buster?!"; Transliteration: "Teki wa Bīto Basutā?!" (Japanese: 敵はビートバスター?!) | Yasuko Kobayashi | October 14, 2012 |
| 35 | "Roar, Tategami Lioh!"; Transliteration: "Tategami Raiō Hoeru!" (Japanese: タテガミライオー 吼える！) | Kento Shimoyama | October 21, 2012 |
| 36 | "Go-Buster Lioh, Kaching!"; Transliteration: "Gōbasutā Raiō Gagīn!" (Japanese: ゴ―バスターライオーガギーン！) | Kento Shimoyama | October 28, 2012 |
| 37 | "The Black and White Brides"; Transliteration: "Kuro to Shiro no Hanayome" (Japanese: 黒と白の花嫁) | Yasuko Kobayashi | November 4, 2012 |
| 38 | "Live! Ace Deathmatch"; Transliteration: "Jikkyō! Ēsu Desumatchi" (Japanese: 実況！エースデスマッチ) | Yasuko Kobayashi | November 11, 2012 |
| 39 | "Finishing Blow! Messiah's Fist"; Transliteration: "Hissatsu! Mesaia no Kobushi" (Japanese: 必殺！メサイアの拳) | Yasuko Kobayashi | November 18, 2012 |
| 40 | "Covering Jay and the Messiahloid"; Transliteration: "Kaburu Jei to Mesaiaroido" (Japanese: カブるＪとメサイアロイド) | Yasuko Kobayashi | November 25, 2012 |
| 41 | "The Thief Pink Buster!"; Transliteration: "Kaitō Pinku Basutā!" (Japanese: 怪盗ピンクバスター！) | Nobuhiro Mouri | December 2, 2012 |
| 42 | "Attack! Within the Megazord"; Transliteration: "Totsugeki! Megazōdo no Naka e" (Japanese: 突撃！メガゾードの中へ) | Yasuko Kobayashi | December 9, 2012 |
| 43 | "Christmas Determination"; Transliteration: "Ketsui no Kurisumasu" (Japanese: 決意のクリスマス) | Yasuko Kobayashi | December 16, 2012 |
| 44 | "Christmas Eve: Time to Complete the Mission"; Transliteration: "Seiya Shimei Hatasu Toki" (Japanese: 聖夜・使命果たすとき) | Yasuko Kobayashi | December 23, 2012 |
| 45 | "Happy New Year: A Small Formidable Enemy, Again"; Transliteration: "Kinga Shinnen Chiisana Kyōteki, Futatabi" (Japanese: 謹賀新年 小さな強敵、再び) | Kento Shimoyama | January 6, 2013 |
| 46 | "The New Fusion and Overheated Rampage!"; Transliteration: "Arata na Yūgō to Netsu Bōsō!" (Japanese: 新たな融合と熱暴走！) | Yasuko Kobayashi | January 13, 2013 |
| 47 | "Reset and Back-Up"; Transliteration: "Risetto to Bakkuappu" (Japanese: リセットとバックアップ) | Yasuko Kobayashi | January 20, 2013 |
| 48 | "Setting the Trap"; Transliteration: "Shikakerareteita Wana" (Japanese: 仕掛けられていた罠) | Yasuko Kobayashi | January 27, 2013 |
| 49 | "Preparation and Selection"; Transliteration: "Kakugo to Sentaku" (Japanese: 覚悟と選択) | Yasuko Kobayashi | February 3, 2013 |
| 50 (Final) | "Eternal Bonds"; Transliteration: "Eien no Kizuna" (Japanese: 永遠のキズナ) | Yasuko Kobayashi | February 10, 2013 |

== Production ==
On September 2, 2011, Toei applied for trademarks on the title to be used on various products. The Japan Patent Office approved these trademarks on September 29, 2011.

== Films and Specials ==
The Go-Busters made their first appearance as a cameo in the crossover film Kaizoku Sentai Gokaiger vs. Space Sheriff Gavan: The Movie.

=== Theatrical ===
==== Protect the Tokyo Enetower! ====
Tokumei Sentai Go-Busters the Movie: Protect the Tokyo Enetower! (特命戦隊ゴーバスターズ THE MOVIE 東京エネタワーを守れ！, Tokumei Sentai Gōbasutāzu Za Mūbī Tōkyō Enetawā o Mamore!) is the main theatrical release for Tokumei Sentai Go-Busters where the Go-Busters must help protect the Tokyo Enetower along with the help of Tokyo Tower's mascot character Noppon (ノッポン). It was released on August 4, 2012, alongside Kamen Rider Fourze the Movie: Space, Here We Come!. The event of the movie takes place between Mission 19 and 20.

==== Go-Busters vs. Gokaiger ====
Tokumei Sentai Go-Busters vs. Kaizoku Sentai Gokaiger: The Movie (特命戦隊ゴーバスターズＶＳ海賊戦隊ゴーカイジャーTHE MOVIE, Tokumei Sentai Gōbasutāzu Tai Kaizoku Sentai Gōkaijā Za Mūbī) was released in theaters on January 19, 2013. As with previous VS movies, this film featured a crossover between the casts of Tokumei Sentai Go-Busters and Kaizoku Sentai Gokaiger, while introducing the 37th Super Sentai, Zyuden Sentai Kyoryuger which is set to start airing in 2013, following the end of Go-Busters. The events of the movie takes place between Mission 41 and 42.

==== Super Hero Taisen Z ====
Kamen Rider × Super Sentai × Space Sheriff: Super Hero Taisen Z (仮面ライダー×スーパー戦隊×宇宙刑事 スーパーヒーロー大戦Z, Kamen Raidā × Sūpā Sentai × Uchū Keiji: Supā Hīrō Taisen Zetto) is a film that was released in Japan on April 27, 2013, which featured the first crossover between characters of Toei's three main Tokusatsu franchises, Kamen Rider, Super Sentai, and the Space Sheriff Series, including other heroes from the Metal Hero Series as well. The protagonists of Space Sheriff Gavan: The Movie, Tokumei Sentai Go-Busters, and Kaizoku Sentai Gokaiger are featured, but the casts of Kamen Rider Wizard, Zyuden Sentai Kyoryuger, and Kamen Rider Fourze also participate in the film. Arisa Komiya reprises her role in the main cast as Yoko Usami, while the rest of the cast have a minor role in the film.

==== Kyoryuger vs. Go-Busters ====
Zyuden Sentai Kyoryuger vs. Go-Busters: The Great Dinosaur Battle! Farewell Our Eternal Friends (獣電戦隊キョウリュウジャーVSゴーバスターズ 恐竜大決戦！ さらば永遠の友よ, Jūden Sentai Kyōryūjā Tai Gōbasutāzu Kyōryū Daikessen! Saraba Eien no Tomo yo) is the Go-Busters second VS movie featuring a crossover with the cast of Zyuden Sentai Kyoryuger, released on January 18, 2014.

==== Ultra Super Hero Taisen ====
A crossover film, titled Kamen Rider × Super Sentai: Ultra Super Hero Taisen (仮面ライダー×スーパー戦隊 超スーパーヒーロー大戦, Kamen Raidā × Supā Sentai Chō Supā Hīrō Taisen) featuring the casts of Kamen Rider Ex-Aid, Amazon Riders, Uchu Sentai Kyuranger, and Doubutsu Sentai Zyuohger, was released in Japan on March 25, 2017. This movie also celebrates the 10th anniversary of Kamen Rider Den-O and features the spaceship Andor Genesis from the Xevious game, which is used by the movie's main antagonists, as well as introduces the movie-exclusive Kamen Rider True Brave, played by Kamen Rider Brave's actor Toshiki Seto from Kamen Rider Ex-Aid, and the villain Shocker Great Leader III, played by the singer Diamond Yukai. In addition, individual actors from older Kamen Rider and Super Sentai TV series, Ryohei Odai (Kamen Rider Ryuki), Gaku Matsumoto (Shuriken Sentai Ninninger), Atsushi Maruyama (Zyuden Sentai Kyoryuger), and Hiroya Matsumoto (Tokumei Sentai Go-Busters) reprise their respective roles.

=== Television Special ===
==== Super Hero Taisen ====
Kamen Rider × Super Sentai: Super Hero Taisen (仮面ライダー×スーパー戦隊 スーパーヒーロー大戦, Kamen Raidā × Sūpā Sentai: Sūpā Hīrō Taisen) is a film celebrating the 10th anniversary of the Super Hero Time programming block on TV Asahi, featuring a crossover between the characters of the Kamen Rider and Super Sentai Series. The cast of Go-Busters participate in the film, along with the cast of Kamen Rider Decade, Kaizoku Sentai Gokaiger and Kamen Rider Fourze. The event of the movie takes place between Mission 8 and 9.

=== V-Cinema ===
==== Go-Busters Returns vs Dobutsu Sentai Go-Busters ====
Tokumei Sentai Go-Busters Returns vs. Doubutsu Sentai Go-Busters (帰ってきた特命戦隊ゴーバスターズ VS 動物戦隊ゴーバスターズ, Kaettekita Tokumei Sentai Gōbasutāzu Tai Dōbutsu Sentai Gōbasutāzu) is a V-Cinema release for Go-Busters that became available for sale on June 21, 2013, and takes place between Missions 44 and 45. While getting ready for New Year's, the Go-Busters are killed by the Great Demon Lord Azazel. Finding himself before God (Syo Jinnai) alongside J, Nick uses his status as the one-millionth death in 2012 to alter history so that Messiah never existed. Though he and J find everyone changed, Nick learns that Hiromu and the others have become the Doubutsu Sentai Go-Busters (動物戦隊ゴーバスターズ, Dōbutsu Sentai Gōbasutāzu), supported by Kuroki as Black Puma, Rika as Pink Cat, and a new individual named Atsushi Doumyoji (Tatsuhisa Suzuki) as Green Hippopotamus, against the Machine Empire Mechalius under Machine Empress Trange Star (Ayame Misaki). However, history repeats itself when Azazel kills the new Go-Busters and Nick ends up in Heaven again. This time, he wishes for both Go-Buster groups to team up against Azazel in his original reality. After destroying Azazel, the other Go-Busters fade away while the original Go-Busters and Nick pay their respects to them.

==== Kyuranger vs. Space Squad ====
Uchu Sentai Kyuranger vs. Space Squad (宇宙戦隊キュウレンジャーVSスペース・スクワッド, Uchū Sentai Kyūrenjā Bāsasu Supēsu Sukuwaddo) is a V-Cinema release that features a crossover between Uchu Sentai Kyuranger and Space Squad. Aside from the main cast of Kyuranger, Yuma Ishigaki and Hiroaki Iwanaga (Space Sheriff Gavan: The Movie), Yuka Hirata (Juken Sentai Gekiranger), Mitsuru Karahashi (Samurai Sentai Shinkenger), Kei Hosogai (Kaizoku Sentai Gokaiger) and Ayame Misaki (Tokumei Sentai Go-Busters) return to reprise their respective roles. The V-Cinema was released on August 8, 2018.

== Video game ==
A Tokumei Sentai Go-Busters video game for the Nintendo DS was released on September 27, 2012. The game was released in Korea as Power Rangers: Go-Busters on August 8, 2013. This was the last official Nintendo DS game to be released in physical media in South Korea.

== Cast ==
- Hiromu Sakurada (桜田 ヒロム, Sakurada Hiromu): Katsuhiro Suzuki (鈴木 勝大, Suzuki Katsuhiro)
- Ryuji Iwasaki (岩崎 リュウジ, Iwasaki Ryūji): Ryoma Baba (馬場 良馬, Baba Ryōma)
- Yoko Usami (宇佐見 ヨーコ, Usami Yōko): Arisa Komiya (小宮 有紗, Komiya Arisa)
- Masato Jin (陣 マサト, Jin Masato): Hiroya Matsumoto (松本 寛也, Matsumoto Hiroya)
- Takeshi Kuroki (黒木 タケシ, Kuroki Takeshi): Hideo Sakaki (榊 英雄, Sakaki Hideo)
- Toru Morishita (森下 トオル, Morishita Tōru): Naoto Takahashi (高橋 直人, Takahashi Naoto)
- Miho Nakamura (仲村 ミホ, Nakamura Miho): Fuuka Nishihira (西平 風香, Nishihira Fūka)
- Rika Sakurada (桜田 リカ, Sakurada Rika): Risa Yoshiki (吉木 りさ, Yoshiki Risa)
- Enter (エンター, Entā): Syo Jinnai (陳内 将, Jinnai Shō)
- Escape (エスケイプ, Esukeipu): Ayame Misaki (水崎 綾女, Misaki Ayame)

=== Voice cast ===
- Cheeda Nick (チダ・ニック, Chida Nikku): Keiji Fujiwara (藤原 啓治, Fujiwara Keiji)
- Gorisaki Banana (ゴリサキ・バナナ, Gorisaki Banana): Tesshō Genda (玄田 哲章, Genda Tesshō)
- Usada Lettuce (ウサダ・レタス, Usada Retasu): Tatsuhisa Suzuki (鈴木 達央, Suzuki Tatsuhisa)
- Beet J. Stag (ビート・J・スタッグ, Bīto Jei Sutaggu): Yuichi Nakamura (中村 悠一, Nakamura Yūichi)
- Messiah (メサイア, Mesaia): Seiji Sasaki (佐々木 誠二, Sasaki Seiji)
- Narrator, Go-Busters Equipment: Shoo Munakata (宗方 脩, Munakata Shū)
- GB Custom Visor (GBカスタムバイザー, Jī Bī Kasutamu), Lio Blaster (リオブラスター, Rio Burasutā), Saburo Hazuki (葉月 サブロー, Hazuki Saburō; 35): Ichirou Mizuki (水木 一郎, Mizuki Ichirō)

=== Guest cast ===
- Maruyama (丸山; 9): Yutaka Maido (まいど 豊, Maido Yutaka)
- Geki Jumonji (十文字 撃, Jūmonji Geki; 31–32): Yuma Ishigaki (石垣 佑磨, Ishigaki Yūma)
- Shelly (シェリー, Sherī; 31–32): Suzuka Morita (森田 涼花, Morita Suzuka)
- Rhino Doubler (ライノダブラー, Raino Daburā; Voice; 31–32): Kōsuke Toriumi (鳥海 浩輔, Toriumi Kōsuke)
- Mamoru Hasegawa (長谷川 マモル, Hasegawa Mamoru; 37): Gong Teyu (孔 大維, Kon Teyu)

== Songs ==
Opening themes

- "Busters Ready Go!" (バスターズ レディーゴー!, Basutāzu Redī Gō!)
  - Lyrics: Shoko Fujibayashi
  - Composition, Arrangement: Kenichiro Oishi
  - Artist: Hideyuki Takahashi (Project.R)
  - Episodes: 1-27
  The song also played in episodes 30, 44, and 50.
- "Morphin! Movin! Busters Ship!" (モーフィン! ムービン! バスターズシップ!, Mōfin! Mūbin! Basutāzushippu!)
  - Lyrics: Shoko Fujibayashi
  - Composition, Arrangement: Kenichiro Oishi
  - Artist: Hideyuki Takahashi (Project.R)
  - Episodes: 28-49

Ending theme

- "Kizuna ~ Go-Busters!" (キズナ～ゴーバスターズ!, Kizuna ~ Gōbasutāzu!; "Bonds ~ Go-Busters!")
  - Lyrics: Shoko Fujibayashi
  - Composition, Arrangement: Kenichiro Oishi
  - Artist: Nazo no Shin Unit Starmen (謎の新ユニットＳＴＡ☆ＭＥＮ, Nazo no Shin Yunitto Sutāmen; The Mysterious New Unit Starmen)
  - Episodes: 1-8, 11-22, 28-44
- "One wish, One day"
  - Lyrics: Shoko Fujibayashi
  - Composition, Arrangement: Morihiro Suzuki
  - Artist: Hiromu Sakurada & Cheeda Nick (Katsuhiro Suzuki & Keiji Fujiwara)
  - Episodes: 9–10, 24
- "Shinpai Honey ♡ Bunny" (心配 ハニー♡バニー, Shinpai Hanī ♡ Banī; "Worry Honey ♡ Bunny")
  - Lyrics: Shoko Fujibayashi
  - Composition, Arrangement: Masaaki Asada
  - Artist: Yoko Usami & Usada Lettuce (Arisa Komiya & Tatsuhisa Suzuki)
  - Episodes: 23
- "Blue Banana Moon"
  - Lyrics: Shoko Fujibayashi
  - Composition, Arrangement: Hiroshi Takaki
  - Artist: Ryuji Iwasaki & Gorisaki Banana (Ryoma Baba & Tesshō Genda)
  - Episodes: 25
- "Kizuna ~ Go-Busters! (2012 Summer MOVIE MIX)" (キズナ～ゴーバスターズ! (2012 Summer MOVIE MIX), Kizuna ~ Gōbasutāzu! (Nisenjūni Samā Mūbī Mikkusu); "Bonds ~ Go-Busters! (2012 Summer MOVIE MIX)")
  - Lyrics: Shoko Fujibayashi
  - Composition, Arrangement: Kenichiro Oishi
  - Artist: Nazo no Shin Unit Starmen
  - Episodes: 26–27
