= List of Kaizoku Sentai Gokaiger characters =

Japanese series

Kaizoku Sentai Gokaiger (海賊戦隊ゴーカイジャー, Kaizoku Sentai Gōkaijā) is a Japanese tokusatsu series. Kaizoku Sentai Gokaiger is the 35th installment in the Super Sentai franchise, and the 23rd entry in the Heisei era. The series centers around a group of space pirates, known as the Gokaigers, who embark on a quest to discover the "Greatest Treasure in the Universe." On their journey, they confront the Zangyack Empire and encounter former members of Super Sentai teams from prior series.

== Main characters ==
=== Gokaigers ===
The main heroes of Kaizoku Sentai Gokaiger. From left to right: Ahim de Famille, Don Dogoier, Gai Ikari, Captain Marvelous, Joe Gibken, and Luka Millfy.

The Gokaigers transformed.

The Gokaigers are space pirates who seek to find the "Greatest Treasure in the Universe". Initially acting out of self-interest, they gradually embrace their 34 Sentai predecessors' roles as protectors of Earth and its inhabitants.

The primary members utilize Mobilates (モバイレーツ, Mobairētsu) cellphones to transform and summon their Gokai Machines. They also each carry a Gokai Saber (ゴーカイサーベル, Gōkai Sāberu) and a Gokai Gun (ゴーカイガン, Gōkai Gan) as sidearms, both of which allow them to perform varying Final Wave (ファイナルウェーブ, Fainaru Wēbu) finishers, such as the Gokai Slash (ゴーカイスラッシュ, Gōkai Surasshu) via the Gokai Saber, the Gokai Blast (ゴーカイブラスト, Gōkai Burasuto) via the Gokai Gun, and the Gokai Scramble (ゴーカイスクランブル, Gōkai Sukuranburu) via both. Later in the series, they acquire the Gokai Galleon Buster (ゴーカイガレオンバスター, Gōkai Gareon Basutā), which allows them to perform the Rising Strike (ライジングストライク, Raijingu Sutoraiku) finisher.

==== Captain Marvelous ====
Captain Marvelous (キャプテン・マーベラス, Kyaputen Māberasu) is the young captain of the Gokaigers. He is willing to use his authority to save his crew and civilians, even risking his life. Marvelous possesses superhuman strength achieved by playing darts with weighted bracelets.

Marvelous can transform into Gokai Red (ゴーカイレッド, Gōkai Reddo). While transformed, he primarily wields the Gokai Saber and Gun.

In Kaizoku Sentai: Ten Gokaiger, Marvelous can transform into Cross Armor Mode, gaining the use of Gokai Galleon-themed torso armor, as well as Galleon Armor Mode, gaining the combined usage of the other Gokaigers' Cross Armor Modes.

Captain Marvelous is portrayed by Ryota Ozawa (小澤 亮太, Ozawa Ryōta). As a child, he is portrayed by Tatsuomi Hamada (濱田 龍臣, Hamada Tatsuomi).

==== Joe Gibken ====
Joe Gibken (ジョー・ギブケン, Jō Gibuken) is Marvelous' first mate and the first to be recruited into the Gokaiger team. Originally a member of Zangyack's Imperial Special Forces, Joe was imprisoned after refusing to murder a group of captive children. He escaped imprisonment, and while on the run Marvelous frees Joe from his tracking collar. Ever since, Joe has sworn loyalty to Marvelous and developed the One-Sword Style: Soul Blade (一刀流ソウルブレード, Ittō-ryū Sōru Burēdo) fighting style.

Joe can transform into Gokai Blue (ゴーカイブルー, Gōkai Burū). While transformed, he primarily dual wields a pair of Gokai Sabers.

In Kaizoku Sentai: Ten Gokaiger, Joe can transform into Cross Armor Mode, gaining the use of a quintuple-bladed, claw-like weapon on his right arm.

Joe Gibken is portrayed by Yuki Yamada (山田 裕貴, Yamada Yūki).

==== Luka Millfy ====
Luka Millfy (ルカ・ミルフィ, Ruka Mirufi) serves as the crew's lookout. Originating from a planet under Zangyack's control, Luka and her friend Cain took care of orphans until her little sister Lia's death. This led Luka to leave their planet to secure funds. While making ends meet as a thief, Luka comes across Marvelous and Joe, who save her during a failed heist and offer her the position of reconnaissance expert. During her time as a Gokaiger, she acquires a collection of jewelry, which her teammates pawn off for local currency, much to her dismay. Despite her greed, she cares for her teammates, especially Ahim de Famille, whom Luka treats as a surrogate little sister.

Luka can transform into Gokai Yellow (ゴーカイイエロー, Gōkai Ierō). While transformed, she primarily dual wields a pair of Gokai Sabers, which she can either combine into a double-bladed weapon or use as a pair of extendable whips, and use them to perform the Flutter Blade (フラッターブレード, Furattā Burēdo), Yellow Curry Dynamite (イエローカレーダイナマイト, Ierō Karē Dainamaito), and Gokai Slice (ゴーカイスライス, Gōkai Suraisu) attacks. Additionally, she has developed acute reflexes in combat, which she uses to make up for her relative lack of physical strength. Her training also enables her to spot nearby treasures and distinguish fake gems from real ones.

In Kaizoku Sentai: Ten Gokaiger, Luka can transform into the Cross Armor Mode, gaining the use of a quadruple blade launcher on her left leg.

Luka Millfy is portrayed by Mao Ichimichi (市道 真央, Ichimichi Mao).

==== Don Dogoier ====
Don Dogoier (ドン･ドッゴイヤー, Don Doggoiyā), nicknamed "Doc" (ハカセ, Hakase), is the ship's mechanic, cook, and caretaker. Before the series, Don was a repairman whom Marvelous, Joe, and Luka sought out for help in fixing the Gokai Galleon. Impressed with Don's skills, Marvelous shanghaied him into his crew. Initially anxious and fearful, Don gradually becomes more confident and able to support his teammates throughout their adventures on Earth. Due to his background, he is dismissed by Zangyack and assigned the lowest bounty until he participates in freeing Marvelous from execution and defeats a leading Zangyack member.

Don can transform into Gokai Green (ゴーカイグリーン, Gōkai Gurīn). While transformed, he primarily dual wields a pair of Gokai Guns. Additionally, he relies heavily on stealth and trickery, with his clumsiness often resembling slapstick.

In Kaizoku Sentai: Ten Gokaiger, Don can transform into Cross Armor Mode, gaining the use of a double-barreled gun on his left arm.

Don Dogoier is portrayed by Kazuki Shimizu (清水 一希, Shimizu Kazuki).

==== Ahim de Famille ====
Ahim de Famille (アイム・ド・ファミーユ, Aimu do Famīyu) is the pirates' diplomat who eases tension among her teammates and is the most fascinated by Earth culture. Prior to joining them, she was the princess of the planet Famille before the Zangyack Imperial Guard destroyed her home planet. While on the run, she came across the Gokaigers and asked to join them.

Ahim can transform into Gokai Pink (ゴーカイピンク, Gōkai Pinku). While transformed, she primarily dual wields a pair of Gokai Guns. During her early days with the Gokaigers, she had no martial prowess and a tendency to make a mess. By the time the pirates arrive on Earth, she became fully capable of holding her own in battle.

In the crossover film Gokaiger Goseiger Super Sentai 199 Hero Great Battle, Ahim can perform the Pink Double Attack Part 2 (ピンクダブルアタックパート2, Pinku Daburu Atakku Pāto Tsū) alongside Super Gosei Pink.

In Kaizoku Sentai: Ten Gokaiger, Ahim can transform into Cross Armor Mode, gaining the use of a quadruple-barrelled cannon on her right leg.

Ahim de Famille is portrayed by Yui Koike (小池 唯, Koike Yui).

==== Gai Ikari ====
Gai Ikari (伊狩 鎧, Ikari Gai) is the only Earthling of the group and a Super Sentai fan who was injured while saving a little girl from being hit by a truck. While recovering in the hospital, Gai was visited in his dreams by the ghosts of Mikoto Nakadai, Time Fire, and Dragon Ranger, who gave him the ability to become Gokai Silver (ゴーカイシルバー, Gōkai Shirubā) and access to their teams' Great Powers. Despite initially being denied membership in the Gokaigers, Gai's enthusiasm and bravery convinced them to let him join.

Gai possesses knowledge of all the previous Sentai teams and the ability to fuse Ranger Keys using his imagination, having used it to create the Go-on Wings Key (ゴーオンウイングスキー, Gōon Uingusu Kī), the Gold Anchor Key (ゴールドアンカーキー, Gōrudo Ankā Kī), and the Gokai Christmas Key (ゴーカイクリスマスキー, Gōkai Kurisumasu Kī). Unlike the primary Gokaigers, he utilizes the Gokai Cellular (ゴーカイセルラー, Gōkai Serurā) to transform and summon his mecha GouZyu Drill. He also wields the Gokai Spear (ゴーカイスピア, Gōkai Supia) sidearm, which has a Spear Mode (スピアモード, Supia Mōdo) for performing the Gokai Shooting Star (ゴーカイシューティングスター, Gōkai Shūtingu Sutā) Final Wave, a Gun Mode (ガンモード, Gan Mōdo) for performing the Gokai Supernova (ゴーカイスーパーノヴァ, Gōkai Sūpānova) Final Wave, and an Anchor Mode (アンカーモード, Ankā Mōdo) for performing the Gokai Legendream (ゴーカイレジェンドリーム, Gōkai Rejendorīmu) and Gokai Legend Crash (ゴーカイレジェンドクラッシュ, Gōkai Rejendo Kurasshu) Final Waves. With the other Gokaigers, he can perform the Gokai Shooting Slash (ゴーカイシューティングスラッシュ, Gōkai Shūtingu Surasshu) Final Wave. Additionally, Gai can assume the following forms:

- Go-on Wings: A hybrid form of Go-on Gold and Silver accessed from the eponymous Ranger Key that allows Gai to dual wield a pair of Rocket Daggers.
- Gold Mode (ゴールドモード, Gōrudo Mōdo): Gai's power-up form accessed from the Gold Anchor Key that grants increased offensive and defensive capabilities at the cost of reduced speed and agility. In this form, he primarily wields the Gokai Spear in Anchor Mode.
- Gokai Christmas: A hybrid form of Gokai Red and Green accessed from the eponymous Ranger Key that allows Gai to wield a Gokai Sword and Gun. His Final Wave in this form is the Gokai Christmas Slash (ゴーカイクリスマススラッシュ, Gōkai Kurisumasu Surasshu).

As of Twokaizer × Gokaiger: The Tanuki-Charmed June Bride, Gai gains access to Ranger Keys of the sixth members from the Go-Busters to the Zenkaigers by attaching the Gokai Tsuiker Unit (ゴーカイツイカーユニット, Gōkai Tsuikā Yunitto) to his Gokai Cellular.

Gai Ikari is portrayed by Junya Ikeda (池田 純矢, Ikeda Jun'ya).

=== Ranger Keys ===
The Ranger Keys (レンジャーキー, Renjā Kī) are mysterious items that were scattered across the cosmos after the previous Super Sentai teams sacrificed their powers to defeat the Zangyack Empire's first invasion wave. After forming the Red Pirates to gather them all, Aka Red gave them to Marvelous so he could find the Greatest Treasure. Stored in the Gokai Treanger Box (ゴーカイトレンジャーボックス, Gōkai Torenjā Bokkusu), the Ranger Keys can be summoned to a Gokaiger's Gokai Buckle (ゴーカイバックル, Gōkai Bakkuru) via a thought-based teleportation system called the Key Road (キーロード, Kī Rōdo). The Ranger Keys allow the Gokaigers to transform, activate their weapons' finishers, and grant access to a previous Sentai team's powers. After unlocking a Legend Sentai's Great Power, the Gokaigers can use the Ranger Keys to enhance their giant robots and access unique powers. While the Gokaigers usually transform into a Sentai hero of their corresponding color and have personal Ranger Keys, the items are not specific to any of them.

In the film Gokaiger Goseiger Super Sentai 199 Hero Great Battle, it is revealed that past Sentai warriors can regain their powers by claiming their Ranger Keys. They can also infuse them with their team's Great Power, at the cost of their powers. However, deceased Sentai warriors such as Mikoto Nakadai of the Abarangers and Gai Yuki of the Jetmen still possess their powers.

During the events of the crossover films Kamen Rider × Super Sentai: Super Hero Taisen and Kamen Rider × Super Sentai × Space Sheriff: Super Hero Taisen Z, the Gokaigers gain Ranger Keys based on Kamen Rider OOO and six Metal Heroes (Jiraiya, Mobile Cop Jiban, Draft Redder, Janperson, Blue Beet, and B-Fighter Kabuto) respectively.

In the crossover film Tokumei Sentai Go-Busters vs. Kaizoku Sentai Gokaiger: The Movie, the Gokaigers seek out the Phantom Ranger Keys (幻のレンジャーキー, Maboroshi no Renjā Kī), which are said to unlock the "Greatest Power in the Universe" (宇宙でもっとも巨大な力, Uchu de Mottomo Kyodai na Chikara). After joining forces with the Go-Busters, the Phantom Ranger Keys transform into Buddyroid Keys (バディロイドキー, Badiroido Kī), which grant the use of giant-sized Megazord Keys (メガゾードキー, Megazōdo Kī) so the Gokaigers and Go-Busters can transform their giant robots into those of past Sentai teams.

=== Gokai Machines ===
The Gokai Machines (ゴーカイマシン, Gōkai Mashin) are the primary Gokaigers' mecha, all normally stored within the Gokai Galleon.

- Gokai Galleon (ゴーカイガレオン, Gōkai Gareon): Gokai Red's personal three-masted spacecraft equipped with the Galleon Ram (ガレオンラム, Gareon Ramu), the Galleon Cannons (ガレオンキャノン, Gareon Kyanon), and several beam cannons on its wings that forms the head and torso of GokaiOh. It was originally Aka Red's vessel before it became the Gokaigers' base of operations.
- Gokai Jet (ゴーカイジェット, Gōkai Jetto): Gokai Blue's personal fighter aircraft-themed Gokai Machine equipped with beam and vulcan cannons as well as an energy cannon that forms the hat and right arm of GokaiOh.
- Gokai Trailer (ゴーカイトレーラー, Gōkai Torērā): Gokai Yellow's personal semi-trailer truck-themed Gokai Machine equipped with ramming power that forms the left leg of GokaiOh.
- Gokai Racer (ゴーカイレーサー, Gōkai Rēsā): Gokai Green's personal open-wheel car-themed Gokai Machine equipped with a beam and energy cannon that forms the left arm of GokaiOh.
- Gokai Marine (ゴーカイマリン, Gōkai Marin): Gokai Pink's personal submarine-themed Gokai Machine equipped with a beam cannon, tracking torpedoes, and homing mines that forms the right leg of GokaiOh.

==== Kaizoku Combinations ====
- GokaiOh (ゴーカイオー, Gōkaiō): The Gokaigers' giant robot composed of the Gokai Machines via Kaizoku Combination (海賊合体, Kaizoku Gattai) that possesses incredible agility, and wields the twin Gokai Ken (ゴーカイケン, Gōkai Ken) swords and the built-in Gokai Hō (ゴーカイホー, Gōkai Hō) chest cannon. Additionally, it can wield other weapons, such as the Gokai Bat (ゴーカイバット, Gōkai Batto). Its finishers are the Gokai Star Burst (ゴーカイスターバースト, Gōkai Sutā Bāsuto) via the Gokai Hō and the Gokai Crash (ゴーカイクラッシュ, Gōkai Kurasshu) via the Gokai Ken. The Gokaigers can also combine GokaiOh with some of the Great Powers to achieve stronger forms, which are as follows:
  - Magi GokaiOh (マジゴーカイオー, Maji Gōkaiō): A combination of GokaiOh and Magi Dragon that grants the use of the latter's abilities. Its finisher is the Gokai Magi Bind (ゴーカイマジバインド, Gōkai Maji Baindo).
  - Deka GokaiOh (デカゴーカイオー, Deka Gōkaiō): A combination of GokaiOh and the Pat Striker that grants increased firepower and the use of the latter's parts as a pair of handguns. Its finishers are the Gokai Full Blast (ゴーカイフルブラスト, Gōkai Furu Burasuto) and the Gokai Pat Strike (ゴーカイパトストライク, Gōkai Pato Sutoraiku).
  - Gao GokaiOh (ガオゴーカイオー, Gao Gōkaiō): The first combination of GokaiOh and Gao Lion that grants the use of the latter's abilities. Its finisher is the Gokai Animal Heart (ゴーカイアニマルハート, Gōkai Animaru Hāto).
  - Shinken GokaiOh (シンケンゴーカイオー, Shinken Gōkaiō): The second combination of GokaiOh and Gao Lion that grants the use of Modikara and the double-bladed Gokai Naginata (ゴーカイナギナタ, Gōkai Naginata). Its finisher is the Gokai Samurai Slash (ゴーカイ侍斬り, Gōkai Samurai Giri).
  - Goren GokaiOh (ゴレンゴーカイオー, Goren Gōkaiō): A combination of GokaiOh and the Variblune that grants flight capabilities. Its finisher is the Gokai Hurricane Cassiopeia (ゴーカイハリケーンカシオペア, Gōkai Harikēn Kashiopea). This combination first appears in the film Gokaiger Goseiger Super Sentai 199 Hero Great Battle.
  - Hurricane GokaiOh (ハリケンゴーカイオー, Hariken Gōkaiō): A combination of GokaiOh and Fuuraimaru that grants the use of a giant shuriken, which allows it to perform Shushutto Shuriken Chain (シュシュッと手裏剣チェーン, Shushutto Shuriken Chēn) attack. Its finishers are the Gokai Infinite Shuriken (ゴーカイ無限手裏剣, Gōkai Mugen Shuriken) and the Gokai Fuurai Attack (ゴーカイ風雷アタック, Gōkai Fūrai Atakku).
  - Go-on GokaiOh (ゴーオンゴーカイオー, Gōon Gōkaiō): A combination of GokaiOh and Machalcon, nicknamed the "Thunder-Sounding Heroic King" (轟音豪快王, Gōon Gōkai Ō), that grants the use of the latter's abilities. Its finisher is the Gokai Go-on Grand Prix (ゴーカイゴーオングランプリ, Gōkai Gōon Guran Puri).
- GouZyu GokaiOh (豪獣ゴーカイオー, Gōjū Gōkaiō): A combination of GokaiOh and GouZyuJin that grants the use of the latter's arm weapons. Its finishers are the Gokai Dengeki Drill Spin (ゴーカイ電撃ドリルスピン, Gōkai Dengeki Doriru Supin) and the Gokai Rex Drill (ゴーカイレックスドリル, Gōkai Rekkusu Doriru).
- Kanzen GokaiOh (カンゼンゴーカイオー, Kanzen Gōkaiō; Complete GokaiOh): A combination of GokaiOh, GouZyuJin, and Machalcon that can perform the Kanzen Drill (カンゼンドリル, Kanzen Doriru) attack and fire the Kanzen Missiles (カンゼンミサイル, Kanzen Misairu). Its finisher is the Gokai Kanzen (Super) Burst (ゴーカイカンゼン (スーパー) バースト, Gōkai Kanzen (Sūpā) Bāsuto). During the events of the crossover film Kaizoku Sentai Gokaiger vs. Space Sheriff Gavan: The Movie, Kanzen GokaiOh performs the Dol Gokai Fire (ドルゴーカイファイヤー, Doru Gōkai Faiyā) attack alongside Gavan's Electronic Starbeast Dol.
- Byunbyum Mach Robo Gokai Custom (ビュンビュンマッハーロボ ゴーカイカスタム, Byunbyun Mahhā Robo Gōkai Kasutamu): A combination of Byunbyum Mach and the Gokai Machines that wields the Gokai Ken and Gokai Hō. This combination appears exclusively in Bakuage Sentai Boonboomger.

=== Great Powers ===
The Great Powers (大いなる力, Ōinaru Chikara) are varying special powers based on the Gokaigers' Sentai predecessors, which they gain by earning past Sentai heroes' approval. While all of the Great Powers are summoned through the corresponding team's set of Ranger Keys, many of them manifest as mecha that can combine with GokaiOh while some allow either it or the Gokaigers themselves to perform unique attacks.

- Mahō Sentai Magiranger: Magi Dragon (マジドラゴン, Maji Doragon) is the Magirangers' mecha that was originally composed of Magi Red's older siblings' Majin forms.
- Tokusou Sentai Dekaranger: The Pat Striker (パトストライカー, Pato Sutoraikā) is Deka Red's personal six-wheeled, police car-themed Deka Machine. Unlike the original Pat Striker, the Gokaigers' version is equipped with lasers on its headlights and Gatling guns on its wheels.
- Juken Sentai Gekiranger: The Geki Beasts (ゲキビースト, Geki Bīsuto) are qi-based projections of the Gekirangers' fighting styles' totem animals. When channeled through GokaiOh, this Great Power allows the giant robot to perform the Gokai Great Geki-Geki Beasts (ゴーカイ大激激獣, Gōkai Dai Geki Geki Jū) finisher.
- Hyakujuu Sentai Gaoranger: Gao Lion (ガオライオン, Gao Raion) is Gao Red's personal Power Animal. Gao Lion initially fights both the Gokaigers and Zangyack until it sees the former fight for altruistic reasons and allows them to summon it from the Animarium to fight alongside them.
- Samurai Sentai Shinkenger: Modikara (モヂカラ, Mojikara) is the Shinkengers' elemental kanji-based power source.
- Gekisou Sentai Carranger: The Carrangers' team pose is what they perform after reciting their roll call. When channeled through GokaiOh, this Great Power allows the giant robot to perform the Gokai Radical Racing Slash (ゴーカイ激走斬り, Gōkai Gekisō Giri) finisher.
- Himitsu Sentai Gorenger: The Variblune (バリブルーン, Bariburūn) is the Gorengers' bulldog-themed flying fortress and base of operations. The Gokaigers acquire this Great Power during the events of the film Gokaiger Goseiger Super Sentai 199 Hero Great Battle.
- J.A.K.Q. Dengekitai: An unseen Great Power that the Gokaigers acquired during the events of the film Gokaiger Goseiger Super Sentai 199 Hero Great Battle.
- Denshi Sentai Denjiman: An unseen Great Power that the Gokaigers acquired during the events of the film Gokaiger Goseiger Super Sentai 199 Hero Great Battle. In the film Kaizoku Sentai Gokaiger vs. Space Sheriff Gavan: The Movie, the Gokaigers use the Denjimen's Great Power in conjunction with that of the Battle Fever team's to open a portal to Makuu Space.
- Dai Sentai Goggle-V: An unseen Great Power that the Gokaigers acquired during the events of the film Gokaiger Goseiger Super Sentai 199 Hero Great Battle.
- Kagaku Sentai Dynaman: The Super Dynamite (スーパーダイナマイト, Sūpā Dainamaito) is the Dynamen's signature finisher. After acquiring this Great Power during the events of the film Gokaiger Goseiger Super Sentai 199 Hero Great Battle, the primary Gokaigers gain the ability to perform the Dynamen's upgraded New Super Dynamite (ニュースーパーダイナマイト, Nyū Sūpā Dainamaito) finisher. When channeled through GokaiOh, this Great Power allows the giant robot to perform the Gokai Super Dynamite (ゴーカイスーパーダイナマイト, Gōkai Sūpā Dainamaito) finisher.
- Choudenshi Bioman: An unseen Great Power that the Gokaigers acquired during the events of the film Gokaiger Goseiger Super Sentai 199 Hero Great Battle.
- Kousoku Sentai Turboranger: An unseen Great Power that the Gokaigers acquired during the events of the film Gokaiger Goseiger Super Sentai 199 Hero Great Battle.
- Gosei Sentai Dairanger: Qi-Power (気力, Kiryoku) is the Dairangers' main power source. When channeled through GokaiOh and GouZyuJin, this Great Power allows the giant robots to perform the Gokai GouZyu Qi-Power Bomber (ゴーカイ豪獣気力ボンバー, Gōkai Gōjū Kiryoku Bonbā) finisher. The Gokaigers acquire this Great Power during the events of the film Gokaiger Goseiger Super Sentai 199 Hero Great Battle.
- GoGo Sentai Boukenger: DaiBouken (ダイボウケン, Daibōken) is the Boukengers' giant robot that wields the GoGo Sword (轟轟剣, Gōgō Ken), which it can lend to GokaiOh and allow the latter to perform the Gokai Adventure Drive (ゴーカイアドベンチャードライブ, Gōkai Adobenchā Doraibu) finisher. The Gokaigers acquire this Great Power during the events of the film Gokaiger Goseiger Super Sentai 199 Hero Great Battle.
- Tensou Sentai Goseiger: The Gosei Headders (ゴセイヘッダー, Gosei Heddā) are the Goseigers' living head-like items. When channeled through GokaiOh, this Great Power allows the giant robot to perform the Gokai All Headder Great Charge (ゴーカイオールヘッダー大進撃, Gōkai Ōru Heddā Daishingeki) finisher. The Gokaigers acquire this Great Power during the events of the film Gokaiger Goseiger Super Sentai 199 Hero Great Battle.
- Mirai Sentai Timeranger: GouZyu Drill (豪獣ドリル, Gōjū Doriru), based on the Timerangers' mecha Time Jet Gamma, is Gokai Silver's personal mecha that is equipped with four GouZyu Cannons (豪獣キャノン, Gōjū Kyanon) and can perform the GouZyu Drill Attack (豪獣ドリルアタック, Gōjū Doriru Atakku). Normally stationed at the Provider Base in the year 3000 AD, Gai can use the Time Fire key to summon his mecha to the present.
- Kyōryū Sentai Zyuranger: GouZyu Rex (豪獣レックス, Gōjū Rekkusu), based on Tyranno Ranger's mecha Guardian Beast Tyrannosaurus, is one of GouZyu Drill's alternate modes accessed from the Dragon Ranger key that is equipped with the tail-mounted GouZyu Rex Drill (豪獣レックスドリル, Gōjū Rekkusu Doriru) and can perform the GouZyu Laser (豪獣レーザー, Gōjū Rēzā) attack.
- Bakuryū Sentai Abaranger: GouZyuJin (豪獣神, Gōjūjin; Brave Beast God), based on the Abarangers' giant robot AbarenOh, is one of GouZyu Drill's alternate modes accessed from the Abare Killer key whose right arm can switch between Drill Mode (ドリルモード, Doriru Mōdo), Shield Mode (シールドモード, Shīrudo Mōdo), and Trident Mode (トライデントモード, Toraidento Mōdo). Its finisher is the GouZyu Triple Drill Dream (豪獣トリプルドリルドリーム, Gōjū Toripuru Doriru Dorīmu).
- Seijuu Sentai Gingaman: An unseen Great Power that when channeled through GouZyuJin allows the giant robot to perform the GouZyu Fierce Cut (豪獣鋭断, Gōjū Eidan) finisher.
- Kyuukyuu Sentai GoGoFive: Five large fire hoses (消火ホース, Shōka Hōsu) based on the Chemical Extinguishers used by the GoGoFive team's giant robot Victory Robo. When channeled through GokaiOh, this Great Power allows the giant robot to perform either the Victory Splash (ビクトリースプラッシュ, Bikutorī Supurasshu) attack or the Gokai Prominence (ゴーカイプロミネンス, Gōkai Purominensu) finisher.
- Ninpuu Sentai Hurricaneger: Fuuraimaru (風雷丸, Fūraimaru) is a sentient ninja-themed mecha who facilitated the combination of the Hurricanegers and Gouraigers' Shinobi Machines into Gourai Senpuujin. Redesigned to resemble Shurikenger's giant robot Tenkuujin Robo Mode, Fuuraimaru rides on a large shuriken and can perform either the Secret Finisher: Crucifixion Shuriken (必殺奥義・磔手裏剣, Hissatsu Ōgi Haritsuke Shuriken) attack or the Secret Finisher: Turbulence Cherry Blossoms (必殺奥義・乱れ桜, Hissatsu Ōgi Midare Zakura) finisher. Fuuraimaru initially appears on his own before the Gokaigers gain the Hurricanegers' blessing and the former's partnership. Fuuraimaru is voiced by Hironori Miyata (宮田 浩徳, Miyata Hironori), who reprises his role from Ninpuu Sentai Hurricaneger.
- Chōjin Sentai Jetman: The will to overcome any hardship, including death, represented by the Jetmen's mecha Icarus Haken's Jet Phoenix (ジェットフェニックス, Jetto Fenikkusu) finisher. After acquiring this Great Power, the primary Gokaigers gain the ability to perform the finisher themselves. When channeled through GokaiOh, this Great Power allows the giant robot to perform the Gokai Jet Phoenix (ゴーカイジェットフェニクス, Gōkai Jetto Fenikusu) finisher.
- Choujyu Sentai Liveman: Super Live Robo (スーパーライブロボ, Sūpā Raibu Robo) is the combination of all five Livemen's mecha.
- Chouriki Sentai Ohranger: The power to bring a team's powers together, represented by the Ohrangers' Olé Bazooka (オーレバズーカ, Ōre Bazūka), which Don and Gai use to complete the Gokai Galleon Buster.
- Engine Sentai Go-onger: Engine Machalcon (炎神マッハルコン, Enjin Mahharukon) is a Formula One car/falcon-themed mecha, an inhabitant of Machine World, and the son of Go-on Red and Yellow's Engine partners Speedor and BearRV respectively. In battle, he can fire energy blasts from his tailpipes and assume Hover Mode (ホバーモード, Hobā Mōdo) to gain flight capabilities. Due to his absent parents, Machalcon becomes a reckless troublemaker who prefers racing over anything else until the Gokaigers realize this and allow him to join them so he can find his purpose. While the Gokaigers originally obtained the ability to summon Machalcon from Saki Rōyama during the events of Gokaiger Goseiger Super Sentai 199 Hero Great Battle, an encounter with Sōsuke Esumi leads the pirates to realize the Go-ongers' true Great Power is the bond between them and Machalcon. Machalcon is voiced by Hiroaki Hirata (平田 広明, Hirata Hiroaki).
- Kaizoku Sentai Gokaiger: The power to seize one's dreams, represented by the giant-sized Kanzen Soul (カンゼンソウル, Kanzen Souru) microchip that combines GokaiOh, GouZyuJin, and Machalcon to form Kanzen GokaiOh.
- Denji Sentai Megaranger: The Mega Wing (メガウイング, Mega Uingu) is a component of Mega Silver's giant robot Mega Winger Fighter Mode that can be used by GouZyuJin to become Wing GouZyuJin (ウイング豪獣神, Uingu Gōjūjin), whose finisher is the Gokai Spartan (ゴーカイスパルタン, Gōkai Suparutan).
- Battle Fever J: An unseen Great Power that the Gokaigers acquired from Battle Fever team member, Shiro Akebono, as a Christmas present. In the film Kaizoku Sentai Gokaiger vs. Space Sheriff Gavan: The Movie, the Gokaigers use the Battle Fever team's Great Power in conjunction with that of the Denjimen's to open a portal to Makuu Space.
- Ninja Sentai Kakuranger: Ninjaman (ニンジャマン) is an ally of the Kakurangers who was sealed in a pot for 10 years following the events of his series until the Gokaigers free him in the present. Ninjaman is voiced by Kazuki Yao, who reprises his role from Ninja Sentai Kakuranger.
- Taiyo Sentai Sun Vulcan: An unseen Great Power that Basco originally stole until the Gokaigers defeated him.
- Dengeki Sentai Changeman: Earth Force (アースフォース, Āsu Fōsu) is the Changemen's mysterious power source. Basco Ta Jolokia originally stole this Great Power until the Gokaigers defeated him. When channeled through GokaiOh, this Great Power allows the giant robot to perform the Gokai Power Bazooka (ゴーカイパワーバズーカ, Gōkai Pawā Bazūka) finisher.
- Choushinsei Flashman: An unseen Great Power that Basco originally stole until the Gokaigers defeated him.
- Hikari Sentai Maskman: Aura Power (オーラパワー, Ōra Pawā) is the Maskmen's mystical power source. Basco originally stole this Great Power until the Gokaigers defeated him. When channeled through GokaiOh, this Great Power allows the giant robot to perform the Gokai Aura Galaxy (ゴーカイオーラギャラクシー, Gōkai Ōra Gyarakushī) finisher.
- Chikyu Sentai Fiveman: An unseen Great Power that Basco originally stole until the Gokaigers defeated him.

==== Other Great Powers ====
- Kamen Rider OOO: An unseen Great Power that appears exclusively in the crossover film Kamen Rider × Super Sentai: Super Hero Taisen.
- Tokumei Sentai Go-Busters: The bond between the Go-Busters and their Buddyroid partners. This Great Power appears exclusively in the crossover film Tokumei Sentai Go-Busters vs. Kaizoku Sentai Gokaiger: The Movie.

==== Greatest Treasure in the Universe ====
The Greatest Treasure in the Universe (宇宙最大のお宝, Uchū Saidai no Otakara) is a small golden pyramid-shaped object hidden in the center of the Earth, which the "Will of the Planet" (地球の意志, Chikyū no Ishi) can speak through. It is capable of freely changing the universe in any way the user wishes, at the cost of every Super Sentai team's existence. While the Gokaigers initially seek out its power to remove the Zangyack Empire from existence, they become conflicted upon learning of its cost and eventually destroy the treasure, opting to confront the Zangyack Empire with their strength.

The "Will of the Planet" is voiced by Tomokazu Seki (関 智一, Seki Tomokazu), who also serves as the series' narrator and the voice of the Gokaigers' equipment.

== Recurring characters ==
=== Zangyack ===
The Space Empire Zangyack (宇宙帝国ザンギャック, Uchū Teikoku Zangyakku) (Note: The name "Zangyack" comes from the Japanese word zangyaku (残虐, "cruelty").) are a race of aliens who have conquered and destroyed an untold number of planets across the galaxy and plan to invade Earth for their emperor, Akudos Gill. While the first 34 Sentai teams foiled Zangyack's first invasion attempt during the Legend War (レジェンド大戦, Rejendo Taisen), Zangyack launches a stronger, second invasion led by the emperor's son Warz Gill from his chariot-like flagship, the Gigant Horse (ギガントホース, Giganto Hōsu). They initially see the Gokaigers as a minor nuisance until the pirates kill Warz, forcing Zangyack to prioritize stopping the pirates. It also convinces Akudos to come and oversee the invasion personally. Ultimately, the Gokaigers destroy a majority of the Zangyack fleet and kill Akudos, dissolving the empire and bringing their reign to an end.

During the events of the crossover film Kamen Rider × Super Sentai: Super Hero Taisen, an alliance of the Sentai teams' revived enemies and Zangyack's remnants form Dai-Zangyack (大ザンギャック, Dai Zangyakku), who join forces with Dai-Shocker to manipulate the Super Sentai and Kamen Riders into destroying each other. After the heroes fight back, Dai-Zangyack and Dai-Shocker combine their respective headquarters, the Gigant Horse and the Crisis Fortress, to form the Big Machine (ビッグマシン, Biggu Mashin) mecha to destroy them, only for the heroes to defeat them and destroy the Big Machine with Rocket Drill Go-BusterOh.

==== Warz Gill ====
Commander Warz Gill (司令官ワルズ・ギル, Shireikan Waruzu Giru) is the hotheaded, inept, petty, and paranoid swash-themed field commander of the Zangyack invasion forces, prince of the Zangyack Empire, and the son of Akudos Gill, whom Warz is desperate to prove himself to. In pursuit of this goal, however, he comes off as hysterical, lashing out when his missions fail. Warz especially shows anger towards Damaras, whom he knows Akudos sent to watch over him because his father lacks faith in him. Despite eventually learning of the Gokaigers' quest for the Greatest Treasure in the Universe, Warz initially refuses to focus on them. After being indirectly wounded by Marvelous, Warz vows to kill the Gokaigers with extreme prejudice. Upon receiving the Great Warz (グレートワルズ, Gurēto Waruzu) war machine, Warz attacks Earth and overpowers the Gokaigers in battle before sending Barizorg to finish them off. Following Barizorg's death, Warz defies Damaras' concerns and returns to Earth to seek revenge, only to be killed by the Gokaigers via Kanzen GokaiOh.

During the events of the crossover film, Kamen Rider × Super Sentai: Super Hero Taisen, Warz is revived to serve in Dai-Zangyack. After being enlarged by the Gigant Horse, he fights Go-BusterOh alongside Akudos until they both are killed by the Big Machine.

The Great Warz is a giant robot that possesses incredible agility, wields the arm-mounted Warz Arrows (ワルズアロー, Waruzu Arō), and can perform the Warz Guilty (ワルズギルティ, Waruzu Giruti) finisher.

Warz Gill is voiced by Hirofumi Nojima (野島 裕史, Nojima Hirofumi).

==== Damaras ====
Chief of Staff Damaras (参謀長ダマラス, Sanbōchō Damarasu) is an armored robot known in the Zangyack Empire as their "Strongest High Ranked Soldier" (最強格の戦士, Saikyōkaku no Senshi) and the "Strongest Man in the Universe" (宇宙最強の男, Uchū Saikyō no Otoko) due to his skills as a general, strategist, and warrior. He is ordered by Akudos Gill to accompany the latter's son, Warz Gill, and assist him as his second-in-command. Due to Warz's personality, Damaras frequently questions his decisions and expresses curiosity about the Gokaigers' reasons for being on Earth. To this end, he sends the Sneak Brothers to infiltrate the Gokai Galleon and learn the pirates' intentions before hiring Basco Ta Jolokia to eliminate the pirates. However, Damaras' efforts to convince Warz to prioritize crippling the Gokaigers' chances of earning Great Powers are hindered by Warz's single-minded focus on Zangyack's invasion of Earth. After the Gokaigers kill Warz, Damaras vows vengeance but allows Akudos to relieve him of his position and send him to the brig out of shame despite being able to easily escape. Nonetheless, Akudos gives Damaras a chance to redeem himself if he executes the Gokaigers personally. The latter forces Basco to help him overpower the Gokaigers while he captures Marvelous, but a combination of Don's successful rescue attempt and Basco's treachery leaves Damaras wounded before his rematch against the Gokaigers. Damaras gets enlarged, but is killed by Kanzen GokaiOh.

In combat, Damaras wields the DamaraSword (ダマラソード, Damarasōdo), which he can charge with energy to enhance it, and the back-mounted DamaLauncher (ダマランチャー, Damaranchā) machine guns.

Damaras is voiced by Kōji Ishii (石井 康嗣, Ishii Kōji).

==== Insarn ====
Development Technical Officer Insarn (開発技官インサーン, Kaihatsu Gikan Insān) is a thermography-themed alien and Zangyack's mad scientist who supplies their Action Commanders with powerful weapons and modifications and desires to make a name for herself as the greatest scientific mind in the universe. She is also charged with enlarging Action Commanders via the Gigant Horse's enlargement cannons and a gun-shaped controller and rarely leaves the flagship. Upon discovering she has no place in the Zangyack hierarchy, she attacks the Gokaigers personally with her giant robot, the Great Insarn (グレートインサーン, Gurēto Insān), to prove her worth to Akudos Gill, only for her robot to be destroyed by Shinken GokaiOh before she is killed by the Gokaigers.

Insarn wields the Operation Magnum (オペレーションマグナム, Operēshon Magunamu) tool that doubles as a whip and the Shoulder Catapult (ショルダーカタパルト, Shorudā Kataparuto) pauldrons that can fire poison missiles. The Great Insarn, meanwhile, possesses a force field and the ability to perform the InThunder (インサンダー, Insandā) attack.

Insarn is voiced by Kikuko Inoue (井上 喜久子, Inoue Kikuko).

==== Barizorg ====
Special Duty Officer Barizorg (特務士官バリゾーグ, Tokumu Shikan Barizōgu) is a cyborg who is completely loyal to Warz Gill and rarely speaks unless the situation calls for it. He was originally Sid Bamick (シド・バミック, Shido Bamikku), a senior officer and Joe's comrade in the Zangyack Imperial Special Forces. However, the former committed treason while freeing the imprisoned Joe and sacrificed himself to cover his friend's escape. Following this, Bamick was forcibly converted into a cyborg by Zangyack scientist Zaien and had most of his memories erased save for his swordsmanship. While Barizorg eventually learns what happened to him, his programming makes him ignore the information. After Warz uses the Great Warz to overpower the Gokaigers, he sends Barizorg to kill them. The latter encounters and faces Joe in battle, during which he is killed, freeing Bamick's soul.

Before he was converted into Barizorg, Bamick was an expert swordsman who could perform the Ittō-ryū Soul Blade (一刀流ソウルブレード, Ittō-ryū Sōru Burēdo) attack, which Barizorg retains following his conversion.

Barizorg is voiced by Gaku Shindo (進藤 学, Shindō Gaku), who also portrays Sid Bamick.

==== Akudos Gill ====
Emperor Akudos Gill (皇帝アクドス・ギル, Kōtei Akudosu Giru) is the fierce kraken-themed leader of the Zangyack Empire, father of Warz Gill, and uncle of Bacchus Gill. After the first 34 Super Sentai teams sacrifice their powers to thwart the Zangyack Empire's first invasion of Earth, Akudos sends Warz with a second invasion force to take advantage of this as well as Damaras to oversee his son. When the Gokaigers kill Wars and Damaras however, Akudos comes to Earth with the entire Zangyack fleet, assumes command of the invasion, and focuses his full attention on the Gokaigers. Once Insarn weakens them, Akudos sends his fleet to Earth to execute a planetary genocide and kill the pirates. Nonetheless, Navi, Marvelous, and Gai narrowly destroy the fleet. Akudos battles the Gokaigers himself, though they eventually kill him using all of their Sentai predecessors' powers and their personal arsenal.

During the events of the crossover film, Kamen Rider × Super Sentai: Super Hero Taisen, Akudos is revived to serve in Dai-Zangyack. After being enlarged by the Gigant Horse, he fights Go-BusterOh alongside Warz until they are both killed by the Big Machine.

In battle, Akudos wields the AkudoSword (アクドソード, Akudosōdo), can fire energy blasts from his shoulders, and possesses superhuman levels of strength, durability, and endurance.

Akudos Gill is voiced by Shinji Ogawa (小川 真司, Ogawa Shinji).

==== Dairando ====
Dairando (ダイランドー, Dairandō) is an arrogant, fun-loving, stonefish-themed alien and a member of the Zangyack Imperial Guard who accompanies Akudos Gill to the Gigant Horse, becoming the latter's second-in-command. After the Gokaigers kill Insarn, Dairando leads the Zangyack armada in attacking the weakened pirates before fighting them personally. Despite initially having the upper hand, he becomes distracted by Marvelous and Gai destroying the armada before the other Gokaigers kill Dairando.

In combat, Dairando wields the Giant Hammer (ジャイアントハンマー, Jaianto Hanmā).

Dairando is voiced by Masashi Ebara (江原 正士, Ebara Masashi).

==== Foot soldiers ====
- Gomin Sailors (兵隊ゴーミン, Heitai Gōmin): Zangyack's robotic foot soldiers who wield weapons provided by Insarn who are typically dropped from Zangyack ships through chandelier-like devices that magnetically hold them by their flat, metallic heads.
- Zugomin Non-Commissioned Officers (下士官スゴーミン, Kashikan Sugōmin): Zangyack officers equipped with beam cannons who lead the Gomin into battle and support the Action Commanders. They can transform into jet fighter configurations capable of linking up into a hovercraft for an Action Commander to ride on and reconfigure their lower bodies into motorcycle-like forms. The Zugomin are voiced by Yoshimitsu Shimoyama (下山 吉光, Shimoyama Yoshimitsu), Kenichirou Matsuda (松田 健一郎, Matsuda Ken'ichirō), Yasuaki Takumi (内匠 靖明, Takumi Yasuaki), Kensuke Tamura (田村 健亮, Tamura Kensuke), and Ibuki (勇吹輝).
- Dogomin Bodyguards (親衛隊ドゴーミン, Shin'eitai Dogōmin): Akudos Gill's bodyguards who are always seen in pairs and wield spears, cannons, and polearms that form the Zangyack insignia. The Dogomin are voiced by Kōzō Dōzaka (堂坂 晃三, Dōzaka Kōzō), Norihisa Mori (森 訓久, Mori Norihisa), and Ibuki.

==== Action Commanders ====
The Action Commanders (行動隊長, Kōdō Taichō) are aliens who serve under Zangyack.

- Shikabanen (シカバネン): A lamprey-themed alien sent to herald the Zangyack Empire's second invasion of Earth who attacks civilians until he is killed by the Gokaigers. Shikabanen is voiced by Tetsuharu Ōta (太田 哲治, Ōta Tetsuharu).
- Bongan (ボンガン): An octopus-themed alien who is sent to lead a second attack wave. After being defeated by the Gokaigers, an enlarged Bongan is killed by GokaiOh. Bongan is voiced by Kōsei Hirota (廣田 行生, Hirota Kōsei).
- Salamandam (サラマンダム, Saramandamu): A coral-themed alien with mechanical tentacles. Originally sent to Earth to use his eruption-inducing powers on Earth's volcanoes, he deviates from his mission to kill the Gokaigers. After being defeated by them, an enlarged Salamandam is killed by Magi GokaiOh. Salamandam is voiced by Masuo Amada (天田 益男, Amada Masuo).
- Zodomas (ゾドマス, Zodomasu): An alien swordsman who believes in winning by any means, having Insarn modify his body with bladed tendrils upon learning about Gokai Blue's two-blade fighting style. After being defeated by Gokai Blue via his newly developed five-blade style, an enlarged Zodomas is killed by Magi GokaiOh. Zodomas is voiced by Hideo Ishikawa (石川 英郎, Ishikawa Hideo).
- Triggerian Buramudo (トリガー星人ブラムド, Torigā Seijin Buramudo): A brain coral-themed Alienizer from Planet Trigger who is wanted by S.P.D. for multiple counts of planetary terrorism. A master of gun-based combat via his two handguns, he works with the Zangyack Empire in a plot to use subterranean missiles to destroy every city on Earth. After his plan is thwarted and he is defeated by the Gokaigers, an enlarged Buramudo is killed by Deka GokaiOh. Buramudo is voiced by Daisuke Kirii (桐井 大介, Kirii Daisuke).
- Nanonanoda (ナノナノダ): A lingula-themed alien who can turn invisible and bypass any security system. He is sent to obtain a gold-bearing tree so the Zangyack Empire can have unlimited funding. However, Nanonanoda accidentally destroys the tree in a fire he caused before he is defeated by the Gokaigers. After being enlarged, he is hurled into space and killed by Deka GokaiOh. Nanonanoda is voiced by Wataru Takagi (高木 渉, Takagi Wataru).
- Pachacamac XIII (パチャカマック１３世, Pachakamakku Jūsansei): The Incan-themed son of the Boukengers and Gekirangers' enemy Pachacamac XII and successor to the Cosmic Kenpō (宇宙拳法, Uchū Kenpō) fighting style. Originally, he could perform the Magnet Fist (磁石拳, Jishakuken) attack before Insarn modifies him so he can perform the Cosmic Science Kenpō Electromagnetic Cannon (宇宙科学拳法・電磁砲, Uchū Kagaku Kenpō Denjihō) attack. After being defeated by the Gokaigers, an enlarged Pachacamac XIII is killed by GokaiOh. Pachacamac XIII is voiced by Yasunori Masutani (増谷 康紀, Masutani Yasunori).
- Sneak Brothers (スニークブラザース, Sunīku Burazāsu): An elite spy duo composed of the humanoid turtle-themed Younger (ヤンガー, Yangā) and his sea urchin-themed, orb-like older brother Elder (エルダー, Erudā). They are sent by Damaras to spy on the Gokaigers, but Elder is swatted into outer space by GokaiOh while Younger is killed by Deka GokaiOh. In the crossover film Kaizoku Sentai Gokaiger vs. Space Sheriff Gavan: The Movie, Elder returns to seek revenge along with his humanoid younger sister, Sister (シスター, Shisutā). Using the power of Makuu Space to create clones of himself that can combine into a giant ball, Elder and Sister battle Gokai Yellow and Green in Makuu City until they are killed during the destruction of the Makuu Prison. Elder, Younger, and Sister are voiced by Shigeru Chiba (千葉 繁, Chiba Shigeru), Nobuyuki Hiyama (檜山 修之, Hiyama Nobuyuki), and Emiri Katō (加藤 英美里, Katō Emiri) respectively.
- Bowser (バウザー, Bauzā): A spider crab/dog-themed alien with superhuman speed and a cybernetic claw for a left hand. Damaras sends him to the Animarium to steal the Gaorangers' Great Power before the Gokaigers can. After the Action Commander is knocked off the island by Gao Lion, Warz Gill changes Bowser's objective to attacking a city. After being defeated by the Gokaigers, an enlarged Bowser is killed by Gao GokaiOh. Bowser is voiced by Keikō Sakai (酒井 敬幸, Sakai Keikō).
- Yokubarido (ヨクバリード, Yokubarīdo): The barnacle-themed leader of Zangyack's "Special Destruction Unit" and a gambler who wields a deck of exploding cards and utilizes the alien element, Gigalorium, to destroy planets. After being defeated by the Gokaigers, an enlarged Yokubarido is killed by Gao GokaiOh. Yokubarido is voiced by Tetsu Shiratori (白鳥 哲, Shiratori Tetsu).
- Zaggai (ザッガイ): An anglerfish-themed alien capable of firing a Vibrational Destruction Beam (振壊ビーム, Shinkai Bīmu). He is sent to retrieve a deadly metal called Poisole (プワゾール, Puwazōru). After the Gokaigers defeat him, an enlarged Zaggai is killed by Shinken GokaiOh. Zaggai is voiced by Keiichi Sonobe (園部 啓一, Sonobe Keiichi).
- Arumadon (アルマドン): A prideful shrimp-themed alien who wears a collar that produces the Aruma Barrier (アルマバリアー, Aruma Bariā) force field. After Warz Gill has Insarn secretly modify his collar to turn him into a suicide bomber, Arumadon is sent to place a bomb in a major city. After the pirates find his collar's weak spot, they almost set off its bomb until Gokai Silver realizes Warz's plan, hacks the collar, and safely removes the bomb before killing Arumadon. Arumadon is voiced by Makoto Yasumura (保村 真, Yasumura Makoto).
- Osogain (オソガイン): A horseshoe crab/rhinoceros-themed alien who is assigned by Damaras to set up a beachhead for the Zangyack Empire's invasion. After being foiled and defeated by Gokai Silver, an enlarged Osogain is killed by GouZyuJin. Osogain is voiced by Dai Matsumoto (松本 大, Matsumoto Dai).
- Worian (ウオーリアン, Uōrian): A piranha/skeleton-themed alien capable of removing targets' skeletons, putting them in a catatonic state. He is deployed to render humans too impassive to resist Zangyack's invasion. After being defeated by Gokai Silver, an enlarged Worian is killed by GouZyuJin. Worian is voiced by Akio Suyama (陶山 章央, Suyama Akio).
- Stargull (スターグル, Sutāguru): A starfish-themed alien who is deployed to find two Power Stones and siphon their energy to summon a large meteor to crash into Earth. After being enlarged by Warz Gill before the Gokaigers can defeat him, Stargull is killed by Shinken GokaiOh while the meteor is deflected by GouZyuJin. Stargull is voiced by Seiji Sasaki (佐々木 誠二, Sasaki Seiji).
- Sen-den (センデン, Senden): A multi-headed Odontamblyopus lacepedii-themed alien and propaganda officer from the Zangyack Agency (ザンギャック・エージェンシー, Zangyakku Ējenshī) capable of performing the Publicity Wave (宣伝波, Sedenpa) and Publicity Punch (宣伝パンチ, Senden Panchi) attacks. After being defeated by the Gokaigers, an enlarged Sen-Den is killed by Shinken GokaiOh and GouZyuJin. Sen-Den is voiced by Yusaku Yara (屋良 有作, Yara Yūsaku).
- Sandaaru Jr. (サンダールJr., Sandāru Junia): A shark-themed alien ninja and the son of Jakanja member Sandaaru, who specializes in the Space Ninpou (宇宙忍法, Uchū Ninpō) fighting style and possesses many of his father's skills. After using his Enlargement Jutsu (巨大身の術, Kyodaimi no Jutsu), Sandaaru Jr. is killed by GouZyuJin and Fuuraimaru. Sandaaru Jr. is voiced by Shūichi Ikeda (池田 秀一, Ikeda Shūichi).
- Satarakura Jr. (サタラクラJr., Satarakura Junia): A peacock/evil clown-themed alien ninja and the son of Jakanja member, Satarakura, who also specializes in Space Ninpou and possesses his father's skills. After being defeated by the Gokaigers and Hurricanegers, Satarakura Jr. enlarges himself before he is destroyed by Hurricane GokaiOh. Satarakura Jr. is voiced by Bin Shimada (島田 敏, Shimada Bin).
- Regaeru (レガエル): A squid/clown-themed alien who can twist his arms into a cannon and fire the Reversal Beam (逆転ビーム, Gyakuten Bīmu) from his Gyakutentacles (ギャクテンタクル, Gyakutentakuru) to body-swap opponents. He is deployed to switch the minds of several world leaders with Zugomin to ensure Earth's nations unconditionally surrender to the Zangyack Empire. After the Gokaigers foil his plans, an enlarged Regaeru is killed by Hurricane GokaiOh. Regaeru is voiced by Kōsuke Asai (浅井 宏輔, Asai Kōsuke).
- Dial (ダイヤール, Daiyāru): An amoeba-themed alien who possesses a Multi-Size Dial (マルチサイズダイヤル, Maruchi Saizu Daiyaru) that allows him to alter his size and wields the Absorbloomer (アブソブルーマー, Abusoburūmā) staff, which is capable of absorbing humans' happiness. Insarn tasks him with collecting happiness from newlywed brides to cure Warz Gill's cold. However, Gokai Pink tricks him into giving up his staff before the rest of the Gokaigers defeat him. Dial is enlarged, but is killed by GouZyu GokaiOh. Dial is voiced by Yasuhiro Takato (高戸 靖広, Takato Yasuhiro).
- Shieldon (シールドン, Shīrudon): A sea turtle-themed alien whose forearms can interlock to form the Thick Face Shield (厚顔シールド, Kōgan Shīrudo), giving him the greatest defensive capability amongst the Zangyack forces. After Gokai Green develops the Gokai Galleon Buster, the Gokaigers use it to defeat Shieldon. He is subsequently enlarged, only to be killed by Hurricane GokaiOh. Shieldon is voiced by Takashi Nagasako (長嶝 高士, Nagasako Takashi).
- Zakyura (ザキュラ): A sea anemone-themed alien with poly-matter digestion capabilities who is sent to reduce the world's food supply. After being defeated by the Gokaigers, an enlarged Zakyura is killed by Fuuraimaru. Zakyura is voiced by Naoki Tatsuta (龍田 直樹, Tatsuta Naoki).
- Vannine (ヴァンナイン, Vannain): A hammerhead shark-themed alien capable of shapeshifting into anyone once he touches their forehead. Having kidnapped Gokai Yellow's friend, Cain, Vannine lures her into a trap and uses her form to infiltrate the Gokai Galleon. However, the other Gokaigers immediately recognize the monster's ruse and deceive him into leading them to their crewmate before defeating him. Vannine is enlarged, but is killed by Hurricane GokaiOh. Vannine is voiced by Kōsuke Toriumi (鳥海 浩輔, Toriumi Kōsuke).
- Bibabu (ビバブー, Bibabū): An effeminate fairy-themed alien and an old friend of Dairando's who wields the Biba Stick (ビバ・ステッキ, Biba Sutekki) wand, which allows him to perform spells capable of turning people into dolls and back. After being defeated by the Gokaigers, an enlarged Bibabu is killed by Kanzen GokaiOh. Bibabu is voiced by Mitsuo Iwata (岩田 光央, Iwata Mitsuo).
- Juju (ジュジュ): A Bumba Meu Boi-themed alien nicknamed the "Devilish Witch Doctor" (悪魔祈祷師, Akuma Kitōshi) who wields a crystal capable of intensifying the darkness in humans' hearts to the point of madness. Insarn sends him to attack people, but the Gokaigers and Ninjaman foil and defeat him. After being enlarged, Juju is killed by Kanzen GokaiOh and Ninjaman. Juju is voiced by Hideaki Kusaka (日下 秀昭, Kusaka Hideaki).

==== Other Action Commanders ====
- Muchaburin (ムチャブリン): An alien who wields the Muchabarrier (ムチャバリアー, Muchabariā) force field. After being defeated by the Gokaigers, an enlarged Muchaburin is killed by GokaiOh. Muchaburin appears exclusively in the Kaizoku Sentai Gokaiger Original Album Otakara Box 1 soundtrack and is voiced by Eiji Miyashita (宮下 栄治, Miyashita Eiji).
- Waredonaier (ワレドナイヤー, Waredonaiyā): A crab-themed alien who accompanies Bacchus Gill, only to be killed by the Kyoryugers. Waredonaier appears exclusively in the crossover film Tokumei Sentai Go-Busters vs. Kaizoku Sentai Gokaiger: The Movie and is voiced by Yuichi Nakamura (中村 悠一, Nakamura Yūichi).

==== Imperial Guard ====
The Imperial Guard (皇帝親衛隊, Kōtei Shin'eitai) are Zangyack's elite soldiers who serve directly under Akudos Gill.

- Deratsueiger (デラツエイガー, Deratsueigā): The crab-themed leader of the Imperial Guard and a fearsome swordsman who is sent by Akudos Gill to help Warz Gill conquer Earth. After being defeated by the Gokaigers, an enlarged Deratsueiger is killed by Shinken GokaiOh. Deratsueiger is voiced by Yuichi Nakamura (中村 悠一, Nakamura Yūichi).
- Zatsurig (ザツリグ, Zatsurigu): A seahorse-themed alien who possesses telekinesis via his chest-mounted eye and is known in the Zangyack ranks as the "Destroyer of Worlds" (惑星の破壊神, Wakusei no Hakaishin) as he had destroyed hundreds of planets, such as Gokai Pink's homeworld. After accompanying Akudos Gill to the Gigant Horse following Warz Gill's death, Zatsurig is deployed to kill the Gokaigers, only to be defeated by them. He is subsequently enlarged, but is killed by Kanzen GokaiOh. Zatsurig is voiced by Hiroki Tōchi (東地 宏樹, Tōchi Hiroki).

==== Other members ====
- Great Scientist Zaien (大科学者ザイエン, Daikagakusha Zaien): A jellyfish-themed Zangyack scientist who converted Sid Bamick into Barizorg. Visiting Warz Gill to check on Barizorg, Zaien agrees to help the prince capture physically fit humans for Warz's plan to mass-produce more Barizorg-like cyborgs. After the Gokaigers and Joh Ohara foil his plan and defeat him, an enlarged Zaien is killed by Hurricane GokaiOh and GouZyuJin. Zaien is voiced by Jōji Nakata (中田 譲治, Nakata Jōji).

=== Navi ===
Navi (ナビィ, Nabyi) is a robotic parrot and perpetual motion machine who originally belonged to Aka Red before joining the Gokaigers and navigating them to the Greatest Treasure in the Universe through her unique form of fortune telling called the Treasure Navigate (お宝ナビゲート, Otakara Nabigēto), which causes her to recite cryptic riddles about their quest. Through these riddles, the Gokaigers encounter past Sentai heroes and important individuals or events. Upon acquiring all of the Sentai teams' Great Powers, the pirates discover Navi is the gate that leads to the Greatest Treasure. Following this, Navi assists the Gokaigers in defeating the Zangyack Empire before joining them on their continuing journeys.

Navi is voiced by Yukari Tamura (田村 ゆかり, Tamura Yukari).

=== Basco Ta Jolokia ===
Basco Ta Jolokia (バスコ・タ・ジョロキア, Basuko Ta Jorokia) (Note: Basco Ta Jolokia's name comes from Tabasco sauce, the Bhut Jolokia chili pepper, and Vasco da Gama.) is an overconfident alien privateer who believes in discarding something of lesser value to gain something more valuable and is capable of assuming a human form. Sometime before the series, he was originally the Red Pirates' cook and friend of Marvelous. Basco accompanied the Red Pirates in collecting the Ranger Keys until he discovered their leader, Aka Red's, intention to use them to find the Greatest Treasure in the Universe before returning them to Earth's Super Sentai. Following this, Basco betrays his comrades to the Zangyack Empire in an attempt to get the Greatest Treasure for himself. While Marvelous escapes with the Ranger Keys the Red Pirates had found up to that point, Basco finds 25 more after the fact.

In the present, Basco travels to Earth in his starship, the Free Joker (フリージョーカー, Furī Jōkā), after being hired by Zangyack officer, Damaras, to neutralize the Gokaigers in exchange for having his bounty removed. Throughout the series, Basco steals the Changemen, Flashmen, Maskmen, Sun Vulcan team, and Fivemen's Great Powers, but loses his Ranger Keys to the Gokaigers. Nonetheless, he allows the team to live so they can earn the remaining Great Powers and facilitate his goal for him. After willfully sacrificing his pet space monkey Sally, Basco succeeds in stealing the Gokaigers' Gokai Galleon, but is eventually defeated and killed in combat by Marvelous.

During the events of the crossover film Uchu Sentai Kyuranger vs. Space Squad, Demost revives Basco, among other deceased enemies of the Sentai teams, to help him in his plans. After the Kyurangers defeat Demost, Basco and the other revived villains are returned to the afterlife.

In both of his forms, Basco wields the CariBlade (カリブレード, Kariburēdo) cutlass and the CariBlaster (カリブラスター, Kariburasutā) handgun. In his human-esque form, he wields the Rapparatta (ラッパラッター, Rapparattā) trumpet, which allows him to transform his Ranger Keys into simulacra to serve him as well as forcibly steal Great Powers from past Sentai warriors and turn them into golden orbs.

Basco Ta Jolokia is portrayed by Kei Hosogai (細貝 圭, Hosogai Kei), who also portrays Akiro Masukoda (益子田 昭郎, Masukoda Akirō) in Kaizoku Sentai: Ten Gokaiger.

==== Sally ====
Sally (サリー, Sarī) is Basco's pet space monkey who carries a pair of cymbals and serves as his bodyguard. Due to her ability to create Giant Battle Pseudo-Lifeforms from her stomach hatch, Basco protects her until she runs out of them. Hoping to take advantage of the Gokaigers' sympathy, he gives her a bomb disguised as a necklace before injuring her so the Gokaigers will take her in and allow her to steal their Ranger Keys. When the pirates treat her injuries and show her kindness, however, a touched Sally attempts to leave Basco. However, the privateer reveals his plan and detonates her bomb in an attempt to kill Marvelous. At the last minute, Sally places the bomb in her hatch, sacrificing herself to take the brunt of the blast while Marvelous survives, albeit with grievous injuries.

Sally is voiced by Toru Omura (大村 亨, Ōmura Tōru).

== Guest characters ==
- Masatoshi Niwano (丹羽野 将年, Niwano Masatoshi): A young boy who possesses knowledge of the first 34 Super Sentai and lost his grandfather during the Legend War. When the Gokaigers first arrive on Earth, Niwano recognizes they have no intention of protecting Earth and attempts to steal their Ranger Keys to do so himself, though he only succeeds in getting the Shinken Red key. Despite desiring to get the Ranger Key back, Marvelous chooses to test Niwano by giving him his Mobilate so the boy can use the Ranger Key to fight the Zangyack Empire himself. Niwano defeats a squad of Gomin but is beaten by Action Commander, Bongan, before Marvelous takes his equipment back and tells Niwano to protect Earth another way while the latter tells him Earth is worth protecting. Niwano later encounters Marvelous while fighting Gomin using kendo training during Zangyack's final attempt to destroy Earth. 10 years later, during the events of Kaizoku Sentai: Ten Gokaiger, Niwano became a scientist who was recruited by Japan's Minister of Defense to help him collect the Ranger Keys and conquer the universe. When Marvelous works to stop the minister, Niwano reunites with the former and his crew to help them foil the minister's plans. Niwano is portrayed by Daichi Izumi (泉 大智, Izumi Daichi) as a child and Kaisei Kawano (川野 快晴, Kawano Kaisei) as an adult.
- Jerashid (ジェラシット, Jerashitto): A sea slug-themed alien and an old friend of Insarn's from high school who possesses the use of jealousy-fueled pyrokinetic attacks, such as the Fiery Jealousy Power (炎のジェラシーパワー, Honō no Jerashī Pawā) and the Jealousy Flame Slash (ジェラシー炎斬り, Jerashī Honō Giri). While working for the Zangyack Empire as an Action Commander, he discovers Insarn fell in love with Kyosuke Jinnai. Harboring unrequited love for her, Jerashid travels to Earth to capture Jinnai, only to be defeated by the Gokaigers, suddenly enlarged by Warz Gill, and defeated by Shinken GokaiOh. Despite being shrunk back to his normal height and surviving the fight, Insarn has him thrown out with Zangyack's trash. After ending up back on Earth with said trash, Jerashid finds his way to a takoyaki stand owned by a man named Nobuyuki and agrees to become his "pet", later apprentice, in exchange for food. However, Nobuyuki's mother vehemently opposes the idea until Jerashid saves her from Action Commander, Sen-Den. Following this, Jerashid and Nobuyuki's mother elope and open a hot spring resort together. In the crossover film Kaizoku Sentai Gokaiger vs. Space Sheriff Gavan: The Movie, Jerashid was imprisoned in Zangyack's Makuu Prison until the Gokaigers free him and the other inmates. Jerashid is voiced by Takahiro Sakurai (櫻井 孝宏, Sakurai Takahiro).
- God (神様, Kami-sama): The Judeo-Christian-Islamic deity of the same name who assumes a feminine form while playing cards with Gai Yuki in heaven's Golden Gate bar. God's female form is portrayed by Rika Kawamura (川村 りか, Kawamura Rika).
- Kiaido (キアイドー, Kiaidō): An alien reputed to be the strongest bounty hunter in the universe who believes that only money and battle truly matter in life. Sometime before the series, he encountered a young Marvelous and nearly killed him, but intentionally scarred himself to create a weak point and make their rematch more interesting before letting Marvelous go. In the present, Kiaido is hired by Barizorg to eliminate the Gokaigers, but the bounty hunter instead attempts to increase the bounty on their heads and give them the chance to become stronger. With Gai Yuki's help, the Gokaigers eventually defeat and kill Kiaido. Kiaido is voiced by Tomokazu Sugita (杉田 智和, Sugita Tomokazu).
- Giant Battle Pseudo-Lifeforms (巨大戦闘擬似生命体, Kyodai Sentō Giji Seimeitai): A race of giant life forms produced by Sally who are based on the Seven Luminaries and named after a different element. The Pseudo-Lifeforms are voiced by Ibuki (勇吹輝) and Yoshimasa Tanno (丹野 宜政, Tanno Yoshimasa).
  - Liquidroid Wateru (リキッドロイド ワテル, Rikiddoroido Wateru): A liquid/water-themed giant with a flexible body, extendable arms, and electrokinesis. It is destroyed by Shinken GokaiOh.
  - Moonroid Tsukki (ムーンロイド ツッキー, Mūnroido Tsukkī): A moon rock-themed giant with a rock-like body and the use of moon-themed attacks. It is destroyed by Shinken GokaiOh and GouZyuJin.
  - Fireroid Meran (ファイヤーロイド メラン, Faiyāroido Meran): A fire-themed giant capable of absorbing fire-based attacks to enhance its own. It is destroyed by GokaiOh and GouZyuJin.
  - Soilroid Dororin (ソイルロイド ドロリン, Soiruroido Dororin): A soil-themed giant capable of trapping its opponents in large amounts of soil. It is destroyed by Kanzen GokaiOh.
  - Woodroid Moririn (ウッドロイド モリリン, Uddoroido Moririn): A wood/plant-themed giant that possesses the Entangling Vine (唐魔蔦, Karamatsuta) arms, which it can stretch and entangle opponents with. It is destroyed by Kanzen GokaiOh.
  - Goldroid Geronpa (ゴールドロイド ゲロンパ, Gōrudoroido Geronpa): A gold-themed giant that can produce paralyzing gold dust. It is destroyed by Kanzen GokaiOh.
  - Sunroid Solar (サンロイド ソーラー, Sanroido Sōrā): A sun-themed giant able to shoot sun-like fireballs. It is destroyed by Kanzen GokaiOh.
- Pollution President Babatcheed (害統領ババッチード, Gaitōryō Babatchīdo): (Note: Babatcheed's name comes from the Japanese word batchii (ばっちい, "dirty").) The new leader of the Gaiark Clan and the son of the group's previous leader, Pollution President Batcheed. Taking command of his father's operations, Babatcheed lures the Gokaigers to the Braneworld of Gunman World before sealing Human World with the Isolation Barrier (鎖国バリア, Sakoku Baria) to keep them out while he battles Zangyack. However, the Gokaigers gain help from Machalcon to return and defeat Babatcheed. After using his Industrial Revolution ability to enlarge himself, Babatcheed is destroyed by Go-on GokaiOh. Babatcheed is voiced by Banjō Ginga (銀河 万丈, Ginga Banjō).
  - Disruption Officer Chirakashizky (保蛮官チラカシズキー, Hobankan Chirakashizukī): (Note: Chirakashizky's name and design is a combination of those of Gaiark Clan members Chirakasonne and Kireizky while his title is based on the Japanese word Hoankan (保安官, "Sheriff").) A cowboy-themed, robotic denizen of Gunman World who wield various firearms, built-in missile launchers, and a lasso that can absorb the Engines' power. Having betrayed his homeworld to join the Gaiark Clan and become Babatcheed's right-hand man, Chirakashizky oversees their conquest of Gunman World until the Gokaigers arrive and defeat him. After using his newly acquired Industrial Revolution ability to enlarge himself, Chirakashizky is destroyed by Hurricane GokaiOh. Chirakashizky is voiced by Takaya Kuroda (黒田 崇矢, Kuroda Takaya).
- Zan-KT0 of the Shot (ショットのザンKT0, Shotto no Zan Kē Tī Zero): A scallop-themed Matroid and servant of the Matrintis Empire. He is deployed to destroy the Negakure Shrine and obtain the power source inside it until he is defeated by the Gokaigers, enlarged by Metal Alice, and destroyed by GouZyuJin. Zan-KT0 of the Shot is voiced by Taketora (武虎).

== Spin-off characters ==
- Los Dark (ロスダーク, Rosu Dāku): The undead captain of a ghost ship that travels the cosmos and houses the spirits of various dead Sentai teams' enemies who appears exclusively in the film Kaizoku Sentai Gokaiger the Movie: The Flying Ghost Ship. Despite possessing a wish-granting relic called the God Eye, his ghostly form prevents him from using it to grant his wish to rule the universe. To remedy this, he preys on would-be thieves and has them killed to use their life force to live again. After the Gokaigers foil Los Dark's scheme, he fights them in his mech, Fake GokaiOh (にせゴーカイオー, Nise Gōkaiō), which is equipped with an eye patch that can shoot laser beams, a large hook that can turn into a cannon, and a quintuple-barreled chest cannon. However, the Gokaigers destroy it, with the resulting explosion taking Los Dark and his ship with it. Los Dark is voiced by Kenji Utsumi (内海 賢二, Utsumi Kenji).
  - Gatsun, Beron, and Pachin (ガツン・ベロン・パチン): A trio of ghosts who reside in Los Dark's ship and harass the Gokaigers. Gatsun, Beron, and Pachin are voiced by Isao Sasaki (ささき いさお(佐々木 功), Sasaki Isao), Mitsuko Horie (堀江 美都子, Horie Mitsuko), and Tsuyoshi Matsubara (松原 剛志, Matsubara Tsuyoshi) respectively.
  - Combined Combatant (合体戦闘員, Gattai Sentōin): A gestalt entity created from the souls of the first 34 Sentai teams' enemy factions' foot soldiers trapped in Los Dark's ship. They initially fight the Gokaigers individually before fusing to increase their chances of success. Due to the foot soldiers' varying personalities and goals, however, the Gokaigers take advantage by killing them via the Battle Fever team's powers. The Combined Combatant and their components are all voiced by Yuuki Anai (穴井 勇輝, Anai Yūki).
- Karizorg (カリゾーグ, Karizōgu): A blank, drone replica of Barizorg who appears exclusively in the Kodansha DVD Special Kaizoku Sentai Gokaiger: Let's Do This Goldenly! Roughly! The 36th Decree Gokai Change!!. Insarn creates him with the intention of fusing him with Gai to turn the latter into a Zangyack soldier and exploit his knowledge on the Gokaigers' Sentai predecessors. However, she inadvertently fuses Gai with Marvelous, damaging Karizorg in the process. After repairing him and briefly fusing him with a cat to ensure her fusion device works, Insarn fuses Karizorg with a Gomin to create Zugozorg (スゴゾーグ, Sugozōgu) to defeat Gai / Marvelous. However, the pirates transform into Gokai Red Gold Mode to defeat Zugozorg before stealing the fusion device to undo what happened to them. Karizorg is voiced by Tomokazu Seki (関 智一, Seki Tomokazu).
- Makuu Prison Warden Ashurada (魔空(マクー)監獄獄長アシュラーダ, Makū Kangoku Gokuchō Ashurāda): The giant clam-themed prison warden of a Zangyack prison located in the otherworldly dimension of Makuu Space and the heir to Don Horror's legacy who bears a grudge against Gavan for his predecessor's demise and appears exclusively in the crossover film Kaizoku Sentai Gokaiger vs. Space Sheriff Gavan: The Movie. Ashurada attempts to take control of the Galactic Union Police via his Chief of Space Police Weeval (宇宙警察総裁ウィーバル, Uchū Keisatsu Sōsai Wībaru) disguise and kill the Gokaigers, but Gavan plays into Ashurada's scheme to expose his identity. The latter retaliates by using his connection to Don Horror to torture Gavan and have Makuu Space consume the universe. However, the Gokaigers save Gavan and join forces with him to kill Ashurada. Ashurada is voiced by Shiro Sano (佐野 史郎, Sano Shirō), who also portrays his Weeval disguise.
  - Gavan Bootleg (ギャバンブートレグ, Gyaban Būtoregu): A robotic warrior built from a combination of Zangyack and Space Police technology to serve Ashurada and resemble Gavan who appears exclusively in the crossover film Kaizoku Sentai Gokaiger vs. Space Sheriff Gavan: The Movie. It is capable of replicating the original Gavan's abilities, can pull individuals into Makuu Space, and access the Makuu Prison's security system. It is destroyed by Gavan.
- Bacchus Gill (バッカス・ギル, Bakkasu Giru): The provisional commander of the Zangyack Empire and nephew of Akudos Gill who appears exclusively in the crossover film Tokumei Sentai Go-Busters vs. Kaizoku Sentai Gokaiger: The Movie. As the last living relative of the Gill family, Bacchus is bent on restoring the Zangyack Empire to its former glory. In pursuit of his goal, he allies with Vaglass to find the Phantom Ranger Keys and use their power. After enlarging himself, however, he is killed by GokaiOh and Go-Buster LiOh. Bacchus Gill is voiced by Takaya Hashi (土師 孝也, Hashi Takaya).
- Gokudos Gill (ゴクドス・ギル, Gokudosu Giru): The giant Kraken-themed embodiment of the Gill family's deceased members who defeated the Gokaigers before the events of the crossover film Tokumei Sentai Go-Busters vs. Kaizoku Sentai Gokaiger: The Movie. In the Doubutsu Sentai Zyuohger episode "Champion of Champions", Bangray uses Gai's memories to create a construct of Gokudos to kill the Gokaigers and Zyuohgers. However, the Sentai teams destroy Gokudos with Wild Tousai King via the power of the Gokaigers' Ranger Keys.
- Bakut Pirates (バクート海賊団, Bakūto Kaizokudan): A group of alien pirates who destroyed 129 planets, can disguise themselves to suit their needs, and appear exclusively in the V-Cinema Kaizoku Sentai: Ten Gokaiger. After downing the Gokai Galleon and gaining information about Earth's Super Sentai, the Bakut Pirates collude with Japan's Minister of Defense to orchestrate the Super Sentai Derby Colosseo (スーパー戦隊ダービーコロッセオ, Sūpā Sentai Dābī Korosseo) as a front to acquire the Ranger Keys so they can conquer the galaxy. To operate the public gambling ring, the pirates and minister order Gai Ikari and young scientist Masatoshi Niwano to borrow the Ranger Keys from the Super Sentai members and develop a machine capable of stealing Sentai powers respectively.
  - Badley (バッドリー, Baddorī): A leading member who wields a billhook-like sword. On Earth, he assumes the identity of Hiroto Hattori (服部 博人, Hattori Hiroto) while posing as an aide to Japan's Minister of Defense until Badley is killed by Gokai Red. Badley is voiced by Tsuyoshi Matsubara (松原 剛志, Matsubara Tsuyoshi), who also portrays his human form.
  - Rem (レム, Remu): A female leading member who can temporarily stop a target's movement and wields a pair of sai. On Earth, she assumes the identity of Hoka Ayanokoji (綾小路 鳳佳, Ayanokōji Hōka) while posing as an aide to Japan's Minister of Defense until she is killed by Gokai Yellow and Pink. Rem is voiced by Rikako Sakata (坂田 梨香子, Sakata Rikako), who also portrays her human form.
  - Agdaros (アグダロス, Agudarosu): A leading member who possesses brute strength and wields a kanabō. On Earth, he assumes the identity of Reizu Horiuchi (堀内 礼図, Horiuchi Reizu) while posing as an aide to Japan's Minister of Defense until Agdaros is killed by Gokai Green and Silver. Agdaros is portrayed by Metal Yoshida (吉田 メタル, Yoshida Metaru).

== Reception ==
Brody Salzman of The Tokusatsu Network praised the Gokaigers, saying that they "will be remembered for decades as one of the most unique teams, one of the most well thought out stories for the weekly episodic format, and as one of the most well-executed Sentai in Toei’s history." Salzman said that "between Ahim and Luka, Gokaiger features some of the most capable, kickass, expressive, and well-developed women rangers in all of Super Sentai even to this very day." Salzman said that Gai is "a tribute to fans, to the series history, and he’s a wonderfully executed foil who pushes the team forward." Alex of My Shiny Toy Robots said of the Gokaigers, "what makes [them] interesting is that they aren't straightforward heroes, nor do they want to be", and that their "detailed back stories [...] are all a pleasure to watch on screen without any significant weak element."

Salzman described Basco Ta Jolokia as the show's "secret story weapon", saying that "even if it would be nice to see more of the villains taking an active role in the story, Basco picks up the slack and creates tension where there was none before [and] turns the story into an even more cohesive whole." Alex praised Basco as "arguably its greatest villain (and possibly one of the best in Super Sentai in general)", saying that he is "the threat that keeps the audience glued."
