= Kamen Rider × Super Sentai: Super Hero Taisen =

- Official movie poster

Japanese name
- Kanji: 仮面ライダー×スーパー戦隊 スーパーヒーロー大戦
Transcriptions
- Revised Hepburn: Kamen Raidā × Supā Sentai Supā Hīrō Taisen
- Directed by: Osamu Kaneda
- Written by: Shōji Yonemura
- Based on: Kamen Rider Decade by Shō Aikawa & Shōji Yonemura Kaizoku Sentai Gokaiger by Naruhisa Arakawa Kamen Rider Fourze by Kazuki Nakashima Tokumei Sentai Go-Busters by Yasuko Kobayashi Kamen Rider OOO by Yasuko Kobayashi
- Produced by: Motoi Sasaki (TV Asahi); Kengo Motoi (TV Asahi); Shinichiro Shirakura (Toei); Kazuhiro Takahashi (Toei); Gen Sato (Toei Video); Koichi Yada (Toei Agency); Akihiro Fukada (Toei Agency)
- Starring: Masahiro Inoue; Ryota Ozawa; Sota Fukushi; Katsuhiro Suzuki; Shu Watanabe
- Narrated by: Tomokazu Seki
- Cinematography: Masao Inokuma
- Edited by: Hiroshi Sunaga
- Music by: Kōtarō Nakagawa; Kousuke Yamashita
- Production companies: Toei Company; TV Asahi; Toei Video; Asatsu DK; Toei Agency; Bandai; Kinoshita Group
- Distributed by: Toei Company
- Release date: April 21, 2012
- Running time: 89 minutes
- Country: Japan
- Language: Japanese
- Box office: $34,796,316

Kamen Rider × Super Sentai: Super Hero Taisen (仮面ライダー×スーパー戦隊 スーパーヒーロー大戦, Kamen Raidā × Supā Sentai Supā Hīrō Taisen) is a 2012 superhero film which features a crossover between the Kamen Rider and Super Sentai series.

The protagonists of Kamen Rider Decade and Kaizoku Sentai Gokaiger are featured, but the casts of Kamen Rider Fourze, Kamen Rider OOO, and Tokumei Sentai Go-Busters also participate. Other returning cast members include Rina Akiyama and Kenjirō Ishimaru reprising their roles from Kamen Rider Den-O.

In its first week it was aired as part of TV Asahi's Super Hero and Heroine Summer Vacation special on August 25, 2013.

== Story ==
The film begins with Captain Marvelous of the Gokaigers confronting and defeating the first seven Kamen Riders before Tsukasa Kadoya appears before him. While Marvelous swears to him he will not rest before all Kamen Riders are destroyed, Tsukasa claims he will not stop until all Super Sentai are vanquished. While watching Earth from the Moon, Kamen Rider Fourze, Yuki and Miu see a series of shooting stars that turn out to be a Zangyack fleet. Within moments, Amanogawa High is invaded by Zangyack militants as Gentaro comes to Shun's aid before being blasted away from the Kamen Rider Club to an area where he meets Captain Marvelous. Introducing himself as Kengo and Yuki arrive while turning down Gentaro's friendship offer, Marvelous reveals his intent to kill many Riders such as Gentaro and becomes Gokai Red. Transforming in response, Kamen Rider Fourze is overpowered by Gokai Red before sicking the soldiers on him. But the Gokai Galleon crew arrive and take out the Zangyack soldiers before they attempt to talk Marvelous out of attacking the Kamen Riders. But Gokai Red is unconvinced as he summons his new ship, the Gigant Horse, and calls in Warz Gill, Ackdos Gill, Brajira of the Messiah, the Black Cross King, Long, Hades God Dagon, the Questers, and Chimatsuri Doukoku. Though Kamen Rider Meteor arrives to lend a hand, Gokai Red retaliates by summoning Rider Hunter Silva to cripple Meteor before inflicting the death blow and tells his crew that Kamen Rider Decade has already taken the lives of the Gorengers and some of the other Super Sentai teams.

At their city's Kazami district, the Go-Busters find people being attacked by various Kamen Rider monsters under Doktor G of the revived Dai-Shocker. Doktor G then introduces the Go-Busters to Dai Shocker's original Great Leader, Tsukasa as he transforms into Kamen Rider Decade to overpower them. But before he can finish them off, the Gokai Galleon crew arrive and demand. However, Decade explains that their captain started this before the Crisis Fortress appears overhead with Doktor G summoning Apollo Geist, the Bat Fangire, the Joker, General Jark, Neo Organism Doras, General Shadow, Llumu Qhimil, and the Arch Orphnoch to weaken the Gokaigers so Decade kills Luka, Ahim and Gai as Joe and Don are forced to retreat.

Elsewhere, Brajira and various Goseiger monsters attack Kamen Rider OOO as the Double Births arrive to provide him back up before Silva arrives. Watching from afar, Marvelous encounters Daiki Kaito and reveals his goal to obtain the "Ultimate Treasure in the Universe" (宇宙最高のお宝, Uchū Saikō no Otakara) by killing all Kamen Riders. Taking out the two Births while fighting Kamen Rider Diend, Gokai Red is about kill his opponent when OOO sacrifices himself to save the other Kamen Rider. Taking Hina and the Core Medals on her person to the Crisis Fortress, Kaito confronts Tsukasa after he gave his forces the order to go after the Goseigers. Kaito manages to take Tsukasa's camera, refusing to support his friend as he and Hina are forced to retreat with Tiger-Roid and Komathunder sent after them as they run into Joe and Doc as they debate over their next course. At Hina's behest, Kaito becomes Diend to wipe out the Dai-Shocker monsters. Learning that he is a Kamen Rider, despite his affirmation he is on no one's side in the conflict, Joe attempts to take out his frustrations on Kaito as he reveals Marvelous's intentions while he spares Joe's life upon beating him. From there, Don offers that they all join forces to solve what is truly going on with Marvelous and Tsukasa.

Seeing that finding one of them is the only way to find answers, Kaito takes the others to Decade as he kills the Goseigers. Though they came only to talk, Joe is intent on fighting as Doras defeats him. However, Marvelous destroys the monster to save Joe and tells his first mate that this is for survival as only one group of heroes can exist. Telling Joe that Akarenger knows the true story, Marvelous tells him not to interfere as he confronts Tsukasa. With their amassed armies ordered to stand back and watch, Marvelous and Tsukasa transform and do battle. With both Gokai Red and Decade evenly matched, the fight ends in a stalemate with Joe attacking Kaito but lacking the will to kill him while admitting he does not want to see any more death. When they decide to find Akarenger, with Joe pointing out that he is dead, Kaito decides to buy them a ride on the DenLiner with the cup of pudding he stole from Momotaros during their last meeting. Arriving in the winter of 1976 to watch his battle with Baseball Mask, Akarenger reveals that he knows why they come and ask them to take him to their time as he is joined by the Zyurangers, Goggle V, Megarangers, Dekarangers, and Livemen. But Kamen Rider 1 suddenly arrives with Kamen Riders Kuuga, Faiz, Kabuto, Kiva, and W with a battle ensuing where only Akarenger and Kamen Rider 1 remain.

However, Akaranger and Kamen Rider 1 are revealed to be Gokai Red and Decade in disguise as both planned to flush out the remaining opposition and finally finish the other off. Mortified with Marvelous's drive to sacrifice their own, a betrayed Joe engages his captain with Kaito protecting him before being knocked out by Decade. With both Kaito and Joe taken out, Gokai Red and Decade resume their epic battle before Doktor G and Silva arrive and reveal that Dai-Shocker and Dai-Zangyack have been playing them both in order to remove any opposition to combining their fortresses into Big Machine to take over the world. However, Marvelous and Tsukasa knew of the treachery and played along while sending those they seemingly defeated into a dimensional rift until the time to spring their trap arrived. Joined by Marvelous's crew, OOO, and the real Akarenger and Kamen Rider 1 as they transform, Decade and Gokaigers are joined by Fourze, Meteor, the Go-Busters, and every other Kamen Rider and Super Sentai team to stand against the Shocker-Zangyack Alliance. However, as Go-BusterOh is formed to fight the enlarged Warz and Akudos while he and Gokaigers defeats General Shadow, Decade is horrified to find a revenge-driven Kaito as he forms Big Machine to teach everyone a lesson as the mecha kills Akudos and Warz.

Entering Big Machine, Diend uses it on Go-BusterOh with Fourze saving Yellow Buster. Given the Rocket Switch Super-1 and a new Astroswitch, Fourze takes over Yellow Buster's place in piloting Go-BusterOh as it engages Big Machine with the Rocket Switch Super-1 giving the giant robot the means to take their opponent into space. Back on Earth, the Gokaigers gain OOO Ranger Keys to take out Silva while Doktor G becomes Kani Laser to overpower the Kamen Riders before the Goseigers give Decade, Ryuki, and Blade their Tensou Cards to overpower the Destron monster prior to using their signature moves to finish him. However, Doktor G is revealed to be Narutaki as he leaves while telling Decade that he will never stop until he is dead. Back in space, using Saturn's gravity as a boost, Fourze installs the Drill Switch Super-3 on Go-BusterOh to destroy Big Machine. Soon after, as Eiji and Hina are reunited, the Gokai Galleon crew watch Fourze befriending the Go-Busters. Marvelous then joins up with his crew, seeing the ultimate treasure being friendship between the Kamen Riders and the Super Sentai teams, while accepting Eiji's friendship. As for Kaito, having survived the Big Machine's destruction but badly injured, gives Tsukasa back his camera and tells him to find his own path before accepting Tsukasa's friendship in his own way while leaving.

== Internet spin-off films ==
To promote the movie, Toei released a series of Internet clips under the collective title Net Movie: Kamen Rider × Super Sentai: Super Hero Taihen: Who Is the Culprit?! (ネット版 仮面ライダー×スーパー戦隊 スーパーヒーロー大変 ～犯人はダレだ？！～, Nettoban Kamen Raidā × Supā Sentai Supā Hīrō Taihen ~Hannin wa Dare da?!~) with a total of 10 webisodes. The web series is written by Shōji Yonemura and Shinichiro Shirakura, and directed by Hiroyuki Kato. Toei Tokusatsu BB and TV Asahi began distribution on April 1, 2012 before releasing them on DVD on August 10, 2012. There are four different formats for the web movies:

- "Kamen Rider Murder Case, You're the Detective!" (仮面ライダー殺人事件 名探偵は君だ！, Kamen Raidā Satsujin Jiken Mei Tantei wa Kimi da!): Kamen Rider Fourze investigates the deaths of Momotaros and Kamen Riders Decade and Double. Though thinking it was the action of a Super Sentai member, the culprit is revealed to be Eitoku who was attempting to kill Seiji Takaiwa and become the suit actor of the lead Kamen Riders.
- "Super Sentai Murder Case, You're the Detective!" (スーパー戦隊殺人事件 名探偵は君だ！, Sūpā Sentai Satsujin Jiken Mei Tantei wa Kimi da!): The Go-Busters investigate the deaths of Gokai Pink, Gosei Pink, and Shinken Pink. Though thinking it was the action of a grasshopper based Kamen Riders, Kamen Rider OOO included as his Batta Medal was among the clues the pink Sentai heroines had on them, the culprit is revealed to be Hiroyuki Kato who killed them in a crime of passion.
- "Special Ops Detective Buddy Go!" (特命探偵バディゴー！, Tokumei Tantei Badi Gō!): Finding himself in a predicament over a letter from a group and fearing he would be sent to the Dark Nebula if he fails, Hayami is taken by a Buddyroid to the Energy Management Center's hangar 07 where the robot's Go-Buster partner helps solve the mystery with humorous results.
- "The Mature Narumi Detective Agency" (オトナの鳴海探偵事務所, Otona no Narumi Tantei Jimusho): Narutaki of Kamen Rider Decade and Urataros of Kamen Rider Den-O form a detective agency to help answer the questions that Gokai Silver of Kaizoku Sentai Gokaiger asks while providing serious background information about the Super Sentai and the Kamen Riders.

== Cast ==
Kamen Rider Series cast

- Tsukasa Kadoya (門矢 士, Kadoya Tsukasa): Masahiro Inoue (井上 正大, Inoue Masahiro)
- Daiki Kaito (海東 大樹, Kaitō Daiki): Kimito Totani (戸谷 公人, Totani Kimito)
- Narutaki (鳴滝)/Doktor G (ドクトルG, Dokutoru Gē): Tatsuhito Okuda (奥田 達士, Okuda Tatsuhito)
- Eiji Hino (火野 映司, Hino Eiji): Shu Watanabe (渡部 秀, Watanabe Shū)
- Hina Izumi (泉 比奈, Izumi Hina): Riho Takada (高田 里穂, Takada Riho)
- Gentaro Kisaragi (如月 弦太朗, Kisaragi Gentarō): Sota Fukushi (福士 蒼汰, Fukushi Sōta)
- Kengo Utahoshi (歌星 賢吾, Utahoshi Kengo): Ryuki Takahashi (高橋 龍輝, Takahashi Ryūki)
- Yuki Jojima (城島 ユウキ, Jōjima Yūki): Fumika Shimizu (清水 富美加, Shimizu Fumika)
- Ryusei Sakuta (朔田 流星, Sakuta Ryūsei): Ryo Yoshizawa (吉沢 亮, Yoshizawa Ryō)
- Miu Kazashiro (風城 美羽, Kazashiro Miu): Rikako Sakata (坂田 梨香子, Sakata Rikako)
- Shun Daimonji (大文字 隼, Daimonji Shun): Justin Tomimori (冨森 ジャスティン, Tomimori Jasutin)
- Tomoko Nozama (野座間 友子, Nozama Tomoko): Shiho (志保)
- JK (JK（ジェイク）, Jeiku): Shion Tsuchiya (土屋 シオン, Tsuchiya Shion)
- Naomi (ナオミ): Rina Akiyama (秋山 莉奈, Akiyama Rina)
- Owner (オーナー, Ōnā): Kenjirō Ishimaru (石丸 謙二郎, Ishimaru Kenjirō)

Super Sentai Series cast

- Captain Marvelous (キャプテン・マーベラス, Kyaputen Māberasu): Ryota Ozawa (小澤 亮太, Ozawa Ryōta)
- Joe Gibken (ジョー・ギブケン, Jō Gibuken): Yuki Yamada (山田 裕貴, Yamada Yūki)
- Luka Millfy (ルカ・ミルフィ, Ruka Mirufi): Mao Ichimichi (市道 真央, Ichimichi Mao)
- Don Dogoier (ドン・ドッゴイヤー, Don Doggoiyā): Kazuki Shimizu (清水 一希, Shimizu Kazuki)
- Ahim de Famille (アイム・ド・ファミーユ, Aimu do Famīyu): Yui Koike (小池 唯, Koike Yui)
- Gai Ikari (伊狩 鎧, Ikari Gai): Junya Ikeda (池田 純矢, Ikeda Jun'ya)
- Hiromu Sakurada (桜田 ヒロム, Sakurada Hiromu): Katsuhiro Suzuki (鈴木 勝大, Suzuki Katsuhiro)
- Ryuji Iwasaki (岩崎 リュウジ, Iwasaki Ryūji): Ryoma Baba (馬場 良馬, Baba Ryōma)
- Yoko Usami (宇佐見 ヨーコ, Usami Yōko): Arisa Komiya (小宮 有紗, Komiya Arisa)
- Takeshi Kuroki (黒木 タケシ, Kuroki Takeshi): Hideo Sakaki (榊 英雄, Sakaki Hideo)
- Toru Morishita (森下 トオル, Morishita Tōru): Naoto Takahashi (高橋 直人, Takahashi Naoto)
- Miho Nakamura (仲村 ミホ, Nakamura Miho): Fuuka Nishihira (西平 風香, Nishihira Fūka)

Miscellaneous voice roles

- Kamen Rider Birth (仮面ライダーバース, Kamen Raidā Bāsu): Asaya Kimijima (君嶋 麻耶, Kimijima Asaya)
- Kamen Rider Birth Prototype (仮面ライダーバース・プロトタイプ, Kamen Raidā Bāsu Purototaipu): Hiroaki Iwanaga (岩永 洋昭, Iwanaga Hiroaki)
- Red One (レッドワン, Reddo Wan): Ryōsuke Sakamoto (阪本 良介, Sakamoto Ryōsuke)
- Geki Red (ゲキレッド, Geki Reddo): Yuki Yamada
- Geki Yellow (ゲキイエロー, Geki Ierō): Mao Ichimichi
- Go-on Red (ゴーオンレッド, Gōon Reddo): Junya Ikeda
- Gosei Red (ゴセイレッド, Gosei Reddo): Yudai Chiba (千葉 雄大, Chiba Yūdai)
- Momotaros (モモタロス, Momotarosu): Toshihiko Seki (関 俊彦, Seki Toshihiko)
- Urataros (ウラタロス, Uratarosu), Kamen Rider Accel (仮面ライダーアクセル, Kamen Raidā Akuseru): Kōji Yusa (遊佐 浩二, Yusa Kōji)
- Kintaros (キンタロス, Kintarosu), Shadow Moon (シャドームーン, Shadō Mūn): Masaki Terasoma (てらそま まさき, Terasoma Masaki)
- Ryutaros (リュウタロス, Ryūtarosu), Kamen Rider Double (仮面ライダーダブル, Kamen Raidā Daburu): Kenichi Suzumura (鈴村 健一, Suzumura Ken'ichi)
- Usada Lettuce (ウサダ・レタス, Usada Retasu), Kamen Rider Ryuki (仮面ライダー龍騎, Kamen Raidā Ryūki), Magi Red (マジレッド, Maji Reddo): Tatsuhisa Suzuki (鈴木 達央, Suzuki Tatsuhisa)
- Apollo Geist (アポロガイスト, Aporo Gaisuto): Kimito Totani
- General Shadow (ジェネラルシャドウ, Jeneraru Shadō): Hidekatsu Shibata (柴田 秀勝, Shibata Hidekatsu)
- Rider Hunter Silva (ライダーハンター・シルバ, Raidā Hantā Shiruba), Riderman (ライダーマン, Raidāman): Kazuo Hayashi (林 一夫, Hayashi Kazuo)
- Akudos Gill (アクドス・ギル, Akudosu Giru): Shinji Ogawa (小川 真司, Ogawa Shinji)
- Warz Gill (ワルズ・ギル, Waruzu Giru): Hirofumi Nojima (野島 裕史, Nojima Hirofumi)
- Brajira of the Messiah (救星主のブラジラ, Kyūseishu no Burajira), Buredoran of the Comet (彗星のブレドラン, Suisei no Buredoran): Nobuo Tobita (飛田 展男, Tobita Nobuo)
- Kamen Rider 1 (仮面ライダー1号, Kamen Raidā Ichigō), Deka Red (デカレッド, Deka Reddo): Tetsu Inada (稲田 徹, Inada Tetsu)
- Kamen Rider 2 (仮面ライダー2号, Kamen Raidā Nigō), General Jark (ジャーク将軍, Jāku-shōgun): Takahiro Fujimoto (藤本 たかひろ, Fujimoto Takahiro)
- Kamen Rider V3 (仮面ライダーV3, Kamen Raidā Bui Surī), Kamen Rider Black (仮面ライダーBLACK, Kamen Raidā Burakku): Hirofumi Tanaka (田中 大文, Tanaka Hirofumi)
- Kamen Rider X (仮面ライダーX, Kamen Raidā Ekkusu): Kazuki Shimizu
- Kamen Rider Kuuga (仮面ライダークウガ, Kamen Raidā Kūga), Doukoku Chimatsuri (血祭 ドウコク, Chimatsuri Dōkoku): Naoki Imamura (今村 直樹, Imamura Naoki)
- Kamen Rider Faiz (仮面ライダーファイズ, Kamen Raidā Faizu): Shu Watanabe
- Kamen Rider Hibiki (仮面ライダー響鬼, Kamen Raidā Hibiki), Doras (ドラス, Dorasu): Hideo Ishikawa (石川 英郎, Ishikawa Hideo)
- Kamen Rider Kabuto (仮面ライダーカブト, Kamen Raidā Kabuto), Long (ロン, Ron): Ibuki (勇吹輝)
- Baseball Mask (野球仮面, Yakyū Kamen), Black Cross King (黒十字王, Kurojūji-ō): Hideyuki Hori (堀 秀行, Hori Hideyuki)
- DecaDriver Voice, DienDriver Voice: Mark Okita (マーク・大喜多, Māku Ōkita)
- Drag Vizor Voice: Tsuyoshi Koyama (小山 剛志, Koyama Tsuyoshi)
- Blay Rouzer Voice: Takeshi Sasaki (佐々木 健, Sasaki Takeshi)
- O-Scanner Voice: Akira Kushida (串田 アキラ, Kushida Akira)
- Narration, Kamen Rider Amazon (仮面ライダーアマゾン, Kamen Raidā Amazon), Kamen Rider Stronger (仮面ライダーストロンガー, Kamen Raidā Sutorongā), Akarenger (アカレンジャー, Akarenjā), Koma-Thunder (コマサンダー, Komasandā), Gokaiger Equipment Voice: Tomokazu Seki (関 智一, Seki Tomokazu)

== Theme song ==
- "Jōnetsu ~We are Brothers~" (情熱 ～We are Brothers～; "Passion ~We are Brothers~")
  - Lyrics: Shoko Fujibayashi
  - Composition: AYANO (of FULL AHEAD)
  - Arrangement: Rider Chips, Junichi "Igao" Igarashi, Kōtarō Nakagawa
  - Artist: Hero Music All Stars
  The Hero Music All Stars consist of Yoshiharu Shiina, the Kamen Rider Girls, Aya Kamiki, TAKUYA, m.c.A.T, Rider Chips, Rica Matsumoto, Hideyuki Takahashi, Tsuyoshi Matsubara, Saki Oshitani, NoB, Psychic Lover, Hideaki Takatori, Takayoshi Tanimoto, Takafumi Iwasaki, Sister MAYO, and Mayumi Gojo.

== Reception ==
Kamen Rider × Super Sentai: Super Hero Taisen grossed $34,796,316 at the box office.
