= Kaizoku Sentai: Ten Gokaiger =

Japanese name
- Kanji: テン・ゴーカイジャー
Transcriptions
- Revised Hepburn: Ten Gōkaijā
- Directed by: Shojiro Nakazawa
- Screenplay by: Naruhisa Arakawa
- Story by: Naruhisa Arakawa; Saburo Yastude
- Based on: Kaizoku Sentai Gokaiger by Naruhisa Arakawa
- Produced by: Shojiro Nakazawa; Noboru Takemoto; Taku Mochizuki; Masayuki Yamada; Motoi Sasaki; Koichi Yada; Akihiro Fukada
- Starring: Ryota Ozawa; Yuki Yamada; Mao Ichimichi; Kazuki Shimizu; Yui Koike; Junya Ikeda; Kei Hosogai; Tomokazu Seki; Kaisei Kawano; Hiroya Matsumoto; Kohei Shoji; Tsuyoshi Matsubara; Rikako Sakata; Metal Yoshida; Jun Yamasaki
- Narrated by: Tomokazu Seki
- Music by: Kosuke Yamashita
- Production company: Toei Company
- Distributed by: Toei Company
- Release date: November 12, 2021
- Running time: 61 minutes
- Country: Japan
- Language: Japanese

Kaizoku Sentai: Ten Gokaiger (テン・ゴーカイジャー, Ten Gōkaijā) is a V-Cinema release, based on Kaizoku Sentai Gokaiger, the 35th entry of the Super Sentai franchise. It had a limited theatrical release on November 12, 2021, followed by its DVD and Blu-ray release on March 9, 2022. The V-Cinema commemorates the 10th anniversary of the series, making Gokaiger the fourth series in the franchise to receive a tenth-anniversary special film after Ninpuu Sentai Hurricaneger, Tokusou Sentai Dekaranger and Engine Sentai Go-onger.

== Plot ==
Ten years after the Gokaigers defeated the Zangyack Empire, (Note: As depicted in the Kaizoku Sentai Gokaiger episode "Farewell Space Pirates".) a member of the former, Don "Doc" Dogoier, visits Earth and discovers a new gambling-based sport called the "Super Sentai Derby Colosseum" was established, wherein Super Sentai warriors gave up their powers and converted them into Ranger Keys so the derby organizers can bring them to life as simulacra and fight for others' entertainment in exchange for the proceeds being used to protect Earth. Doc soon reunites with his crewmate Gai Ikari, who helped Japan's Minister of Defense create the derby and wants his powers back, but Doc claims it was lost after their starship, the Gokai Galleon, was destroyed and their team disbanded.

The Gokaigers' leader, Captain Marvelous soon returns to Earth, intent on destroying the derby, only to be captured by his former crewmate Luka Millfy and turned over to the derby's administration. Nonetheless, he makes a bet with them: if he can successfully defeat 100 Sentai warriors alone, the derby will be dissolved. Otherwise, he will give up his powers. Marvelous easily defeats his first 99 opponents, but learns Ikari is his last, with the latter determined to protect the derby for Earth's sake. With help from one of the minister's assistants, Ikari defeats Marvelous, who is rescued by their crewmate Ahim de Famille. The minister brands the pair fugitives and sends his simulacra after them. Due to this, Doc, Ikari, and ministry assistant Masatoshi Niwano attempt to intervene in their friends' favor, only to be arrested.

While in prison, Doc uses a wiretap he put on Ikari's Ranger Key to overhear the minister's plot to use the Ranger Keys he gathered to conquer the universe before helping Ikari and Niwano escape. They soon rendezvous with Marvelous, Famille, and their friend Joe Gibken. Marvelous recognizes Niwano as a boy that he encountered when the Gokaigers first came to Earth (Note: As depicted in the Kaizoku Sentai Gokaiger episode "The Worth of This Planet".) before revealing the minister is working with a group of space pirates called the Bakut Pirates, who he has pursued after they destroyed the Gokai Galleon. Meanwhile, Millfy borrows Doc's powers to rescue him and uses an alien artifact that Famille previously stole to undo the Bakut Pirates' disguises while Doc uses his wiretap recording to publicly expose the minister's crimes. The minister attempts to escape with the Ranger Keys, but Niwano thwarts him while the Gokaigers defeat the Bakut Pirates. After, they reunite with their ally Navi for a celebratory meal.

== Cast ==
- Captain Marvelous (キャプテン・マーベラス, Kyaputen Māberasu): Ryota Ozawa (小澤 亮太, Ozawa Ryōta)
- Joe Gibken (ジョー・ギブケン, Jō Gibuken): Yuki Yamada (山田 裕貴, Yamada Yūki)
- Luka Millfy (ルカ・ミルフィ, Ruka Mirufi): Mao Ichimichi (市道 真央, Ichimichi Mao)
- Don Dogoier (ドン･ドッゴイヤー, Don Doggoiyā): Kazuki Shimizu (清水 一希, Shimizu Kazuki)
- Ahim de Famille (アイム・ド・ファミーユ, Aimu do Famīyu): Yui Koike (小池 唯, Koike Yui)
- Gai Ikari (伊狩 鎧, Ikari Gai): Junya Ikeda (池田 純矢, Ikeda Jun'ya)
- Akiro Masukoda (益子田 昭郎, Masukoda Akirō): Kei Hosogai (細貝 圭, Hosogai Kei)
- Ring announcer, Narration, Gokaiger Equipment Voice: Tomokazu Seki (関 智一, Seki Tomokazu)
- Masatoshi Niwano (丹羽野 将年, Niwano Masatoshi): Kaisei Kawano (川野 快晴, Kawano Kaisei)
- Hiroya Matsumoto (松本 寬也, Matsumoto Hiroya): Hiroya Matsumoto (松本 寛也, Matsumoto Hiroya)
- Takamichi Crystaria (クリスタリア 宝路, Kurisutaria Takamichi): Kohei Shoji (庄司 浩平, Shōji Kōhei)
- Children: Shion Ōba (大場 心温, Ōba Shion), Jin Takahashi (高橋 仁, Takahashi Jin)
- Old man: Gan Furukawa (古川 がん, Furukawa Gan)
- Old woman: Nono Kagawa (香川 のの, Kagawa Nono)
- High school girls: Kaoruko Ishii (石井 薫子, Ishii Kaoruko), Rara Shimizu (清水 らら, Shimizu Rara)
- Curry restaurant owner: Pachiku Kato (加藤 パーチク, Katō Pāchiku)
- Hattori (服部): Tsuyoshi Matsubara (松原 剛志, Matsubara Tsuyoshi)
- Ayanokoji (綾小路, Ayanokōji): Rikako Sakata (坂田 梨香子, Sakata Rikako)
- Horiuchi (堀内): Metal Yoshida (吉田 メタル, Yoshida Metaru)
- Minister of Defense: Jun Yamasaki (山崎 潤, Yamasaki Jun)
- Navi (ナビィ, Nabyi; Voice): Yukari Tamura (田村 ゆかり, Tamura Yukari)

== Theme song ==
- "Super Sentai Hero Getter Ten-Gokaiger Ver." (スーパー戦隊 ヒーローゲッター〜テン・ゴーカイジャーver.〜, Sūpā Sentai Hīrō Gettā Ten Gōkaijā Bājon)
  - Lyrics: Shoko Fujibayashi, Naruhisa Arakawa
  - Composition & Arrangement: Kenichiro Ōishi
  - Artist: Project.R
