= Kaizoku Sentai Gokaiger the Movie: The Flying Ghost Ship =

- Film poster for both Kamen Rider OOO Wonderful: The Shogun and the 21 Core Medals and Kaizoku Sentai Gokaiger the Movie: The Flying Ghost Ship

Japanese name
- Kanji: 海賊戦隊ゴーカイジャーTHE MOVIE 空飛ぶ幽霊船
Transcriptions
- Revised Hepburn: Kaizoku Sentai Gōkaijā Za Mūbī Sora Tobu Yūreisen
- Directed by: Katsuya Watanabe
- Written by: Naruhisa Arakawa
- Based on: Kaizoku Sentai Gokaiger by Naruhisa Arakawa
- Produced by: Motoi Sasaki; Takaaki Utsunomiya; Takahito Ōmori; Kōichi Yada; Akihiro Fukada
- Starring: Ryota Ozawa; Yuki Yamada; Mao Ichimichi; Kazuki Shimizu; Yui Koike; Junya Ikeda; Rina Aizawa; Yumi Sugimoto; Nao Oikawa
- Narrated by: Tomokazu Seki
- Cinematography: Shingo Osawa
- Music by: Kousuke Yamashita
- Production companies: TV Asahi; Toei Company; Toei Video; Toei Animation; ADK; Toei Agency; Bandai
- Distributed by: Toei Company
- Release date: August 6, 2011
- Running time: 31 minutes
- Country: Japan
- Language: Japanese

Kaizoku Sentai Gokaiger the Movie: The Flying Ghost Ship (海賊戦隊ゴーカイジャーTHE MOVIE 空飛ぶ幽霊船, Kaizoku Sentai Gōkaijā Za Mūbī Sora Tobu Yūreisen) is the title of the film edition of the 35th Super Sentai Series Kaizoku Sentai Gokaiger. The superhero film was released on August 6, 2011, double-billed with the Kamen Rider OOO film Kamen Rider OOO Wonderful: The Shogun and the 21 Core Medals, and was released in both 2D and 3D formats. The Flying Ghost Ship follows the adventures of the Gokaigers, who embark on a quest to find a ghost ship and acquire the legendary treasure called the God Eye (ゴッドアイ, Goddo Ai), which grants any kind of wish to whoever wields it. During their adventure, they must face Los Dark, the captain of the ghost ship, and a host of revived enemies of the previous Super Sentai teams such as Agent Abrella, Baseball Mask and several enemy grunts.

== Plot ==
While on a morning jog, Gai Ikari witnesses the sky turn dark as a massive flying ghost ship emerges from the clouds. Summoning his mecha GouZyu Rex to investigate, he is shocked further when he is attacked by a giant copy of his fellow Gokaigers' mecha GokaiOh, Fake GokaiOh, which defeats him before retreating to the ghost ship. Meanwhile, his crewmates discover the phenomenon and identify the ship as a space-faring ghost ship said to carry a fabled treasure known as the "God Eye", which grants its owner any wish. Seeing this as a better alternative to the Greatest Treasure in the Universe, the Gokaigers embark on a voyage to the ghost ship to acquire the God Eye despite the risks.

Upon reaching the ship, they are harassed by a trio of ghosts that unknowingly lead them to the bridge and the God Eye. However, they are stopped by the ship's undead captain, Los Dark, who sends them to an underworld-like pocket dimension, intending to use their souls to resurrect himself so he can use the God Eye. After fighting two consecutive waves of their Super Sentai predecessors' defeated enemies' ghosts, the Gokaigers realize they have no chance of surviving if this continues on. Choosing to stay behind as a distraction, most of the Gokaigers fight the third wave while their leader, Captain Marvelous, reaches a portal leading back to the ghost ship. After Los Dark closes the portal, Marvelous fights him to retrieve the God Eye and uses it to bring his crewmates back. While his wish is granted, the item shatters soon after.

Realizing the God Eye was a fake, the Gokaigers overpower Los Dark, who summons Fake GokaiOh to kill them in retaliation. They fight back with GokaiOh, eventually killing Los Dark and destroying Fake GokaiOh and the ghost ship. Later, while having a celebratory lunch, they are rejoined by Ikari, who is disappointed to learn the God Eye was a fake, though his crewmates assure him finding the Greatest Treasure in the Universe is more preferable.

== Cast ==
- Captain Marvelous: Ryota Ozawa
- Joe Gibken: Yuki Yamada
- Luka Millfy: Mao Ichimichi
- Don Dogoier: Kazuki Shimizu
- Ahim de Famille: Yui Koike
- Gai Ikari: Junya Ikeda
- Navi: Yukari Tamura
- Los Dark: Kenji Utsumi
- Warz Gill: Hirofumi Nojima
- Damaras: Kōji Ishii
- Insarn, Baseball park announcer: Kikuko Inoue
- Barizorg: Gaku Shindo
- Agent Abrella: Ryūsei Nakao
- Baseball Mask: Ichirō Nagai
- Gatsun: Isao Sasaki
- Beron: Mitsuko Horie
- Pachin: Tsuyoshi Matsubara
- Past Combatants: Yūki Anai
- Saki Rōyama: Rina Aizawa
- Miu Sutō: Yumi Sugimoto
- Kegalesia: Nao Oikawa
- Narration, Mobilate Voice, Gokai Sabre Voice, Gokai Gun Voice, Gokai Cellular Voice: Tomokazu Seki
