= Kaizoku Sentai Gokaiger vs. Space Sheriff Gavan: The Movie =

- Official movie poster with the tag line: "Space Pirates vs. Space Sheriff" (宇宙海賊VS宇宙刑事, Uchū Kaizoku tai Uchū Keiji) featuring Gavan (left) and Gokai Red (right)

Japanese name
- Kanji: 海賊戦隊ゴーカイジャーVS宇宙刑事ギャバン THE MOVIE
Transcriptions
- Revised Hepburn: Kaizoku Sentai Gōkaijā Tai Uchū Keiji Gyaban Za Mūbī
- Directed by: Shojiro Nakazawa
- Written by: Naruhisa Arakawa
- Produced by: Motoi Sasaki (TV Asahi); Tsuyoshi Nakano (Toei Video); Takaaki Utsunomiya; Takahito Ōmori (Toei); Kōichi Yada; Akihiro Fukada (Toei Agency)
- Starring: Ryota Ozawa; Yuki Yamada; Mao Ichimichi; Kazuki Shimizu; Yui Koike; Junya Ikeda; Kenji Ohba
- Cinematography: Fumio Matsumura
- Music by: Kousuke Yamashita; Chumei Watanabe
- Distributed by: Toei Company
- Release date: January 21, 2012
- Running time: 64 minutes
- Country: Japan
- Language: Japanese
- Box office: ¥520 million ($4.9 million)

Kaizoku Sentai Gokaiger vs. Space Sheriff Gavan: The Movie (海賊戦隊ゴーカイジャーVS宇宙刑事ギャバン THE MOVIE, Kaizoku Sentai Gōkaijā Tai Uchū Keiji Gyaban Za Mūbī) is a superhero film adaptation of the 35th anniversary Super Sentai Series Kaizoku Sentai Gokaiger. The film is part the Super Sentai VS film series, but unlike previous films which featured two Super Sentai teaming up, it features a team up between the Gokaigers and the eponymous Space Sheriff Gavan, celebrating the 30th anniversary of Gavan and Toei's Metal Hero Series as a whole. The movie also features the debut of the main three heroes of Tokumei Sentai Go-Busters. The catchphrase of the movie is "Space Pirates vs. Space Sheriff" (宇宙海賊VS宇宙刑事, Uchū Kaizoku Tai Uchū Keiji).

Gokaiger vs. Gavan was released on January 21, 2012, and features the casts and characters of both Gokaiger and Gavan, Kenji Ohba not only portrays his character from Gavan, but also reprises his roles from Battle Fever J and Denshi Sentai Denjiman.

The film debuted at #2 on its opening weekend at the Japanese box-office with a gross of ¥160,750,000, exceeding the opening sales of 2011's Tensou Sentai Goseiger vs. Shinkenger: Epic on Ginmaku by approximately 14%. The film ultimately grossed ¥520,000,000 in its entire run.

== Plot ==
After sending Gai Ikari to buy dinner for them, the remaining Gokaigers are suddenly confronted and apprehended by Retsu Ichijouji, who takes them to his superior Space Police Chief Weeval to expose him as Ashurada, a member of the Zangyack Empire and descendant of Ichijouji's enemy Don Horror. After freeing the Gokaigers, Ichijouji orders them to leave. Ikari rescues the Gokaigers while Ichijouji is captured by Ashurada and his robotic enforcer Gavan Bootleg and taken to the pocket dimension of Makuu Space. While regrouping, the Gokaigers' Captain Marvelous reveals Ichijouji rescued and inspired him as a child to his crewmates and vows to return the favor.

As Ashurada meets with his leader Akudos Gill to reveal his plan to use his connection to Don Horror to torture Ichijouji and expand Makuu Space to consume Earth, the Gokaigers receive a call from Basco ta Jolokia, who reveals Gavan is imprisoned at the top floor of the Zangyack's Makuu Prison. They later encounter past Super Sentai warriors and acquaintances of Ichijouji, Daigoro Oume and Shiro Akebono, who reveal further that the Gokaigers can use the Denjimen and Battle Fever team's powers to reach Makuu Space. The pirates breach the prison and cause a breakout, attracting Zangyack forces. Ikari and Joe Gibken stay behind to fend them off while the others work to reach the top floor. Meanwhile, Jolokia attempts to take advantage of the Gokaigers' absence to steal their Ranger Keys, only to be thwarted by the Go-Busters.

Gavan Bootleg sends the Gokaigers to different dimensions to impede their progress, but Marvelous eventually reaches the top floor and frees Ichijouji while fighting Gavan Bootleg. The Gokaigers blast their way back to the ground floor before destroying the prison and returning to Earth, where they battle Ashurada, Gavan Bootleg, and a Zangyack platoon. Working together, they destroy Gavan Bootleg and the platoon, but Ashurada enlarges himself, prompting the Gokaigers and Ichijouji to summon their mecha to weaken him before Marvelous and Ichijouji kill him.

As they bid each other farewell, the Gokaigers and Ichijouji are reunited with Oume and Akebono.

== Cast ==
- Captain Marvelous: Ryota Ozawa (小澤 亮太, Ozawa Ryōta)
- Joe Gibken: Yuki Yamada (山田 裕貴, Yamada Yūki)
- Luka Millfy: Mao Ichimichi (市道 真央, Ichimichi Mao)
- Don Dogoier: Kazuki Shimizu (清水 一希, Shimizu Kazuki)
- Ahim de Famille: Yui Koike (小池 唯, Koike Yui)
- Gai Ikari: Junya Ikeda (池田 純矢, Ikeda Jun'ya)
- Gavan/Retsu Ichijouji, Shiro Akebono, Daigoro Oume: Kenji Ohba (大葉 健二, Ōba Kenji)
- Basco Ta Jolokia: Kei Hosogai (細貝 圭, Hosogai Kei)
- Kegalesia: Nao Oikawa (及川 奈央, Oikawa Nao)
- Shizuka of the Wind: Mami Yamasaki (山崎 真実, Yamasaki Mami)
- 10-year-old Marvelous: Tatsuomi Hamada (濱田 龍臣, Hamada Tatsuomi)
- Ashurada/Weeval: Shiro Sano (佐野 史郎, Sano Shirō)
- Navi: Yukari Tamura (田村 ゆかり, Tamura Yukari; Voice)
- Machalcon: Hiroaki Hirata (平田 広明, Hirata Hiroaki; Voice)
- Akudos Gill: Shinji Ogawa (小川 真司, Ogawa Shinji; Voice)
- Dairando: Masashi Ebara (江原 正士, Ebara Masashi; Voice)
- Insarn: Kikuko Inoue (井上 喜久子, Inoue Kikuko; Voice)
- Jerashid: Takahiro Sakurai (櫻井 孝宏, Sakurai Takahiro; Voice)
- Elder: Shigeru Chiba (千葉 繁, Chiba Shigeru; Voice)
- Sister: Emiri Katō (加藤 英美里, Katō Emiri; Voice)
- Sally: Toru Omura (大村 亨, Ōmura Tōru; Voice)
- Yogostein: Kiyoyuki Yanada (梁田 清之, Yanada Kiyoyuki; Voice)
- Kitaneydas: Mitsuaki Madono (真殿 光昭, Madono Mitsuaki; Voice)
- Bae: Akira Ishida (石田 彰, Ishida Akira; Voice)
- Gekkou of Illusions: Banjō Ginga (銀河 万丈, Ginga Banjō; Voice)
- Vancuria: Misa Watanabe (渡辺 美佐, Watanabe Misa; Voice)
- Yatsudenwani: Kyousei Tsukui (津久井 教生, Tsukui Kyōsei; Voice)
- Red Buster (Hiromu Sakurada): Katsuhiro Suzuki (鈴木 勝大, Suzuki Katsuhiro; Voice)
- Blue Buster (Ryuji Iwasaki): Ryoma Baba (馬場 良馬, Baba Ryōma; Voice)
- Yellow Buster (Yoko Usami): Arisa Komiya (小宮 有紗, Komiya Arisa; Voice)
- Narration, Mobilate Voice, Gokai Sabre Voice, Gokai Gun Voice, Gokai Cellular Voice, Gokai Spear Voice, Gokai Galleon Buster Voice: Tomokazu Seki (関 智一, Seki Tomokazu)
- Tensouder: Ikuya Sawaki (沢木 郁也, Sawaki Ikuya; Voice)
- Go-Busters Equipment Voice: Shoo Munakata (宗方 脩, Munakata Shū)

== Theme song ==
- "JUMP"
  - Lyrics: Yuho Iwasato
  - Composition: Yūsuke Mochida (持田 裕輔, Mochida Yūsuke)
  - Arrangement: Project.R (Hiroaki Kagoshima)
  - Artist: Tsuyoshi Matsubara & Akira Kushida
