= Naruhisa Arakawa =

Japanese screenwriter

- Born: March 14, 1964 (age 62); Nagoya, Aichi Prefecture, Japan
- Citizenship: Japanese
- Education: Aichi Prefectural University
- Occupations: Screenwriter, Lyricist
- Writing career
- Language: Japanese
- Genre: Science fiction

Naruhisa Arakawa (荒川 稔久, Arakawa Naruhisa; born March 14, 1964) is a Japanese screenwriter who primarily works on anime and tokusatsu dramas. He first served as a series' main writer for Blue Seed anime and the Kamen Rider Series revival Kamen Rider Kuuga. Arakawa was the main series writer for the Super Sentai anniversary series Kaizoku Sentai Gokaiger where he is also credited as a lyricist for the ending theme song with Shoko Fujibayashi. He also wrote the lyrics to "Detekoi Tobikiri Zenkai Power!", the first ending theme of Dragon Ball Z.

== Anime ==
=== Television series ===
- series head writer denoted in bold
- Doteraman (1986-1987)
- High School! Kimengumi (1987)
- Dragon Ball (1987)
- Tsuide ni Tonchinkan (1988)
- Gaki Deka (1989)
- Idol Densetsu Eriko (1989-1990)
- Madö King Granzört (1989-1990)
- Kyatto Ninden Teyandee (1990)
- Mitsume ga Tōru (1990-1991)
- Magical Angel Sweet Mint (1990-1991)
- Jankenman (1991-1992)
- **Blue Seed** (1994-1995)
- **The Legend of Snow White** (1994-1995)
- El-Hazard: The Wanderers (1995-1996)
- The Story of Cinderella (1996)
- Martian Successor Nadesico (1996-1997)
- Mizuiro Jidai (1996-1997)
- Kero Kero Chime (1997)
- Cyberteam in Akihabara (1998)
- **Steam Detectives** (1998)
- **Sentimental Journey** (1998)
- All Purpose Cultural Cat Girl Nuku Nuku (1998)
- Nazca (1998)
- **Black Heaven** (1999)
- **Steel Angel Kurumi** (1999)
- **Seraphim Call** (1999)
- **Suzie-chan to Marvy** (1999-2000)
- Hiwou War Chronicles (2000)
- Daa! Daa! Daa! (2000-2002)
- Samurai Deeper Kyo (2002)
- Dragon Drive (2002)
- Megaman NT Warrior (2002)
- **Rizelmine** (2002)
- **D.N.Angel** (2003)
- **The Cosmopolitan Prayers** (2004)
- **Hit o Nerae!** (2004)
- **Love Love?** (2004)
- **Jinki: Extend** (2005)
- **Elemental Gelade** (2005)
- **Love Get Chu: Miracle Seiyu Hakusho** (2006)
- **Saru Get You -On Air-** (2006-2007)
- A Penguin's Troubles (2008)
- **Spice and Wolf** (2008-2009)
- **Element Hunters** (2009-2010)
- **Yosuga no Sora** (2010)
- **Listen to Me, Girls. I Am Your Father!** (2012)
- **Upotte!!** (2012)
- **So, I Can't Play H!** (2012)
- **Maoyu** (2013)
- **Outbreak Company** (2013)
- **Jinsei** (2014)
- **Gonna be the Twin-Tail!!** (2014)
- Lady Jewelpet (2014)
- **Active Raid** (2016)
- **Terra Formars: Revenge** (2016)
- **Twin Star Exorcists** (2016-2017)
- **This Art Club Has a Problem!** (2016)
- **Action Heroine Cheer Fruits** (2017)
- **Island** (2018)
- **Let's Make a Mug Too** (2021)
- **More Than a Married Couple, But Not Lovers** (2022)
- **There's No Freaking Way I'll be Your Lover! Unless...** (2025)
- **Chitose Is in the Ramune Bottle** (2025)
- **Blade & Bastard** (2027)

=== OVAs ===
- Fūma no Kojirō (1989)
- Shiawase no Katachi (1990)
- Iria: Zeiram the Animation (1994)
- Blue Seed 2 (1996)
- Idol Project (1997)
- Canary (2002)
- Naisho no Tsubomi (2008)

== Tokusatsu ==
=== Television series ===
- series head writer denoted in bold
- Kamen Rider Black (1987)
- Chōjin Sentai Jetman (1991)
- Kyōryū Sentai Zyuranger (1992-1993)
- Gosei Sentai Dairanger (1993-1994)
- Ninja Sentai Kakuranger (1994)
- Choukou Senshi Changéríon (1996)
- Gekisou Sentai Carranger (1996-1997)
- Denji Sentai Megaranger (1997-1998)
- Seijuu Sentai Gingaman (1998-1999)
- Moero!! Robocon (1999)
- **Kamen Rider Kuuga** (2000-2001)
- **Steel Angel Kurumi Pure** (2002)
- Ninpuu Sentai Hurricaneger (2002)
- **Bakuryū Sentai Abaranger** (2003-2004)
- **Tokusou Sentai Dekaranger** (2004-2005)
- Mahou Sentai Magiranger (2005-2006)
- GoGo Sentai Boukenger (2006-2007)
- **Magister Negi Magi** (2007-2008)
- Juken Sentai Gekiranger (2007-2008)
- Engine Sentai Go-Onger (2008)
- Kamen Rider W (2009)
- Tensou Sentai Goseiger (2010)
- Daimajin Kanon (2010)
- **Kaizoku Sentai Gokaiger** (2011-2012)
- **Unofficial Sentai Akibaranger** (2012-2013)
- Doubutsu Sentai Zyuohger (2016)
- Uchu Sentai Kyuranger (2017)
- Kaitou Sentai Lupinranger VS Keisatsu Sentai Patranger (2018)
- **Super Sentai Strongest Battle** (2019)
- Kishiryu Sentai Ryusoulger (2019)
- **Mashin Sentai Kiramager** (2020-2021)
- No.1 Sentai Gozyuger (2025)
- **Kamen Rider MY-TH** (2026)

=== Films ===
- Bakuryū Sentai Abaranger DELUXE: Abare Summer is Freezing Cold! (2003)
- Tokusou Sentai Dekaranger The Movie: Full Blast Action (2004)
- Juken Sentai Gekiranger: Nei-Nei! Hou-Hou! Hong Kong Decisive Battle (2007)
- Engine Sentai Go-onger vs. Gekiranger (2009)
- Gokaiger Goseiger Super Sentai 199 Hero Great Battle (2011)
- Kaizoku Sentai Gokaiger the Movie: The Flying Ghost Ship (2011)
- Kaizoku Sentai Gokaiger vs. Space Sheriff Gavan: The Movie (2012)
- Super Sentai Movie Party (2020)
  - Kishiryu Sentai Ryusoulger VS Lupinranger VS Patranger the Movie
  - Mashin Sentai Kiramager Episode Zero

=== V-Cinema ===
- Denji Sentai Megaranger vs. Carranger (1998)
- Seijuu Sentai Gingaman vs. Megaranger (1999)
- Tokusou Sentai Dekaranger vs. Abaranger (2005)
- Mahou Sentai Magiranger vs. Dekaranger (2006)
- Chō Ninja Tai Inazuma! (2006)
- Chō Ninja Tai Inazuma!! Spark (2007)
- Juken Sentai Gekiranger vs Boukenger (2008)
- Space Sheriff Next Generation (2014)
  - Space Sheriff Sharivan Next Generation
  - Space Sheriff Shaider Next Generation
- Tokusou Sentai Dekaranger: 10 Years After (2015)
- Space Squad (2017)
  - Space Squad: Gavan vs. Dekaranger
  - Girls in Trouble: Space Squad Episode Zero
- Lupinranger VS Patranger VS Kyuranger (2019)
- Kaizoku Sentai: Ten Gokaiger (2021)
- Bakuryū Sentai Abaranger 20th: The Unforgivable Fury (2023)
