= Ryota Ozawa =

Japanese actor

- 小澤 亮太
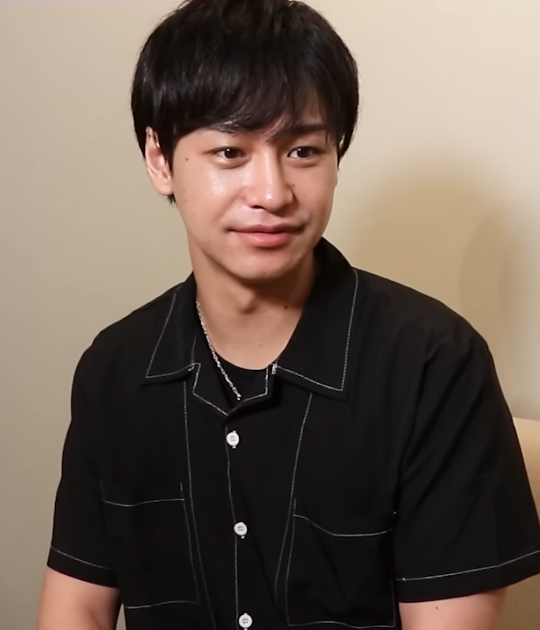
- Ozawa in 2022
- Born: January 25, 1988 (age 38); Tateyama, Chiba, Japan
- Occupation: Actor
- Years active: 2008-present
- Height: 177 cm (5 ft 10 in)

Ryota Ozawa (小澤 亮太, Ozawa Ryōta; born January 25, 1988) is a Japanese actor best known for his role as Captain Marvelous/Gokai Red in the 2011 Super Sentai series Kaizoku Sentai Gokaiger.

== Filmography ==
=== TV Drama ===
| Year | Title | Role | Network | Other notes |
|---|---|---|---|---|
| 2011 | Kaizoku Sentai Gokaiger | Captain Marvelous/Gokai Red | TV Asahi | Main role |
| 2012 | Akumu No Drive | Nobuo Nekota | | |
| 2013 | Naru Youni Narusa | Takeru Nagashima | TBS | |
| 2014 | S - Saigo no Keikan | Hideo Shinoda | TBS | Episode 1 |
| 2014 | Naru Youni Narusa 2 | Takeru Nagashima | TBS | |
| 2014 | Fasuto Kurasu | Yuichi Kawase | Fuji TV | |
| 2016 | AKB Love Night: Love Factory | Kazuki | Episode 17 | |
| 2016 | Doubutsu Sentai Zyuohger | Captain Marvelous/Gokai Red | TV Asahi | Episodes 28 & 29 |
| 2019 | Super Sentai Strongest Battle | Captain Marvelous/Gokai Red | TV Asahi | Main role |
| 2019 | Sherlock: Untold Stories | Hiroto Shimizu | Fuji TV | Episode 5 |

=== Films ===
| Year | Title | Role | Other notes |
|---|---|---|---|
| 2011 | Tensou Sentai Goseiger vs. Shinkenger: Epic on Ginmaku | Gokai Red | Cameo, voice role |
| 2011 | Gokaiger Goseiger Super Sentai 199 Hero Great Battle | Captain Marvelous/Gokai Red | Main role |
| 2011 | Kaizoku Sentai Gokaiger the Movie: The Flying Ghost Ship | Captain Marvelous/Gokai Red | Main role |
| 2012 | Kaizoku Sentai Gokaiger vs. Space Sheriff Gavan: The Movie | Captain Marvelous/Gokai Red | Main role |
| 2012 | Kamen Rider × Super Sentai: Super Hero Taisen | Captain Marvelous/Gokai Red | Main role |
| 2013 | Tokumei Sentai Go-Busters vs. Kaizoku Sentai Gokaiger: The Movie | Captain Marvelous/Gokai Red | |
| 2013 | Toei Hero Next 3: Love Gear | Yuichi Takaoka | |
| 2013 | Kamen Rider × Super Sentai × Space Sheriff: Super Hero Taisen Z | Gokai Red | Voice role |
| 2014 | Tomo ni Aruku | Tetsuya Matsumoto | |
| 2014 | Samayou Koyubi | | |
| 2015 | Piece of Cake | Mitsu | |
| 2016 | Nozokime | | |
| 2016 | Shimauma | | |
| 2021 | Kaizoku Sentai: Ten Gokaiger | Captain Marvelous/Gokai Red | |
| 2022 | Kikai Sentai Zenkaiger vs. Kiramager vs. Senpaiger | Captain Marvelous/Gokai Red | |
| 2026 | No.1 Sentai Gozyuger vs. Boonboomger | Captain Marvelous/Gokai Red | |

=== Stageplay ===
- Fushigi Yuugi (2010) - Tasuki
- 31.5 million seconds and little (2013) - Naoto Kawahara

=== Books ===
- Color (2011)
- Home Ground (2014)
