= Junya Ikeda =

Japanese actor (born 1992)

- 池田 純矢
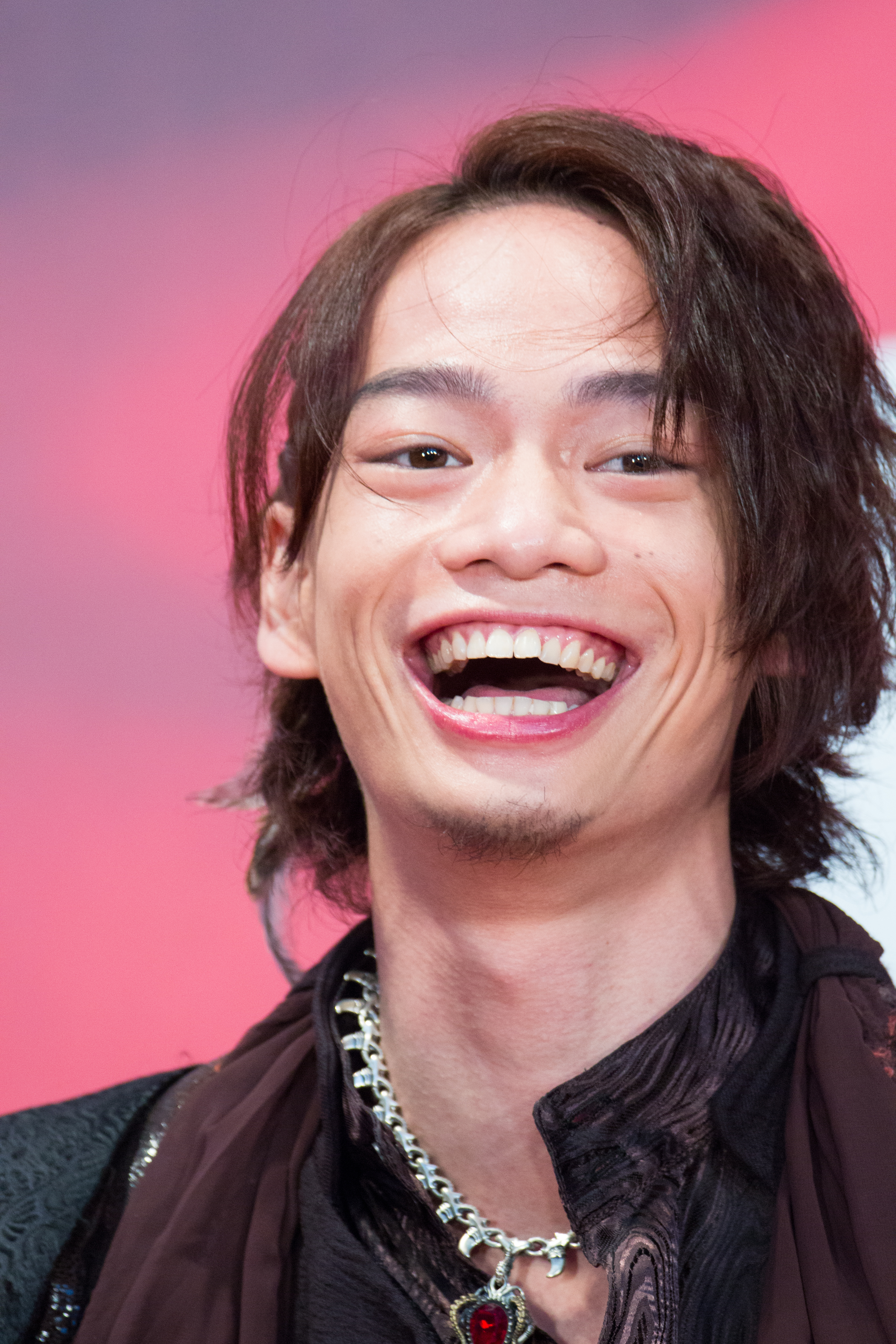
- Ikeda at the 2017 Tokyo International Film Festival
- Born: Jun Shimogaito; October 27, 1992 (age 33); Osaka Prefecture, Japan
- Other names: Jun Ikeda; Jun Sugiyama
- Occupations: Actor; screenwriter; stage director
- Years active: 2006–2023
- Children: 3
- Criminal information
- Conviction: Fraud
- Penalty: 3 years imprisonment

Details
- Date apprehended: October 12, 2024; 23 months ago

Jun Shimogaito (下垣内 純, Shimogaito Jun; born October 27, 1992), known professionally as Junya Ikeda (池田 純矢, Ikeda Jun'ya) and formerly Jun Ikeda (池田 純, Ikeda Jun), is a Japanese actor. Ikeda made his acting debut on the 2007 television drama Our Textbook and rose to popularity for his role as Gai Ikari/Gokai Silver in the 2011 television series Kaizoku Sentai Gokaiger. As a voice actor, he portrayed Mitsuru Tenma in Ensemble Stars! and Million Knives in Trigun Stampede.

== Career ==
Under the name Jun Ikeda, at age 14, Ikeda participated in the 19th Junon Super Boy Contest in 2006 and won second place. Since his appearance in the 2011 musical Kokoro, produced by Niconico and based on the Vocaloid song of the same name, he changed his stage name to Junya Ikeda. On October 30, 2023, BaRu, Ikeda's talent agency, announced that it had canceled their contract with him after he was arrested on October 26.

== Personal life ==
Ikeda has been married since 2016. His wife, a non-celebrity woman, also had a daughter from her first marriage born in 2018. The couple also had another child born that same year.

=== Special fraud allegations and arrest ===
On October 26, 2023, Ikeda was arrested from an incident on September 26, where he had allegedly conspired with several other accomplices on a special fraud case. He allegedly impersonated a police officer and falsely claimed to a man in his 60s to give him his three cash cards to investigate an unauthorized withdrawal from his bank account. On November 15, Ikeda was arrested again after it was found that he had reportedly withdrawn ¥1.5 million from the victim's bank accounts. As a result of his arrests, his voice was removed from The Kingdoms of Ruin and Ensemble Stars!. On October 12, 2024, Ikeda revealed on his Twitter account that he was found guilty and sentenced to three years in prison.

== Filmography ==
=== Film ===
- Dive!! (2008) - Hiroya Sakai
- Randy's (2009) - Masami
- Inu no Kubiwa to Korokke to (2011)
- Gakudori (2011)
- Ninja Kids!!! (2011) - Shioe Monjirou
- Kaizoku Sentai Gokaiger the Movie: The Flying Ghost Ship (2011) - Gai Ikari/Gokai Silver
- Kaizoku Sentai Gokaiger vs. Space Sheriff Gavan: The Movie (2012) - Gai Ikari/Gokai Silver
- Kamen Rider × Super Sentai: Super Hero Taisen (2012) - Gai Ikari/Gokai Silver, Go-On Red (voice)
- Tokumei Sentai Go-Busters vs. Kaizoku Sentai Gokaiger: The Movie (2013) - Gai Ikari/Gokai Silver
- Love Gear (2013) - Takuma Sekiguchi
- Kamen Rider × Super Sentai × Space Sheriff: Super Hero Taisen Z (2013) - Gai Ikari/Gokai Silver, Kamen Rider Meteor (voice)
- Messiah "Shikkoku no Shō" (2013) - Junya Higayama
- Shinjuku Swan (2015)
- Garo: Kami no Kiba (2017) - Takeru Jakuzure/Zen the Flame Sword Knight
- Kaizoku Sentai: Ten Gokaiger (2021) - Gai Ikari/Gokai Silver

=== Television ===
- Watashitachi no Kyōkasho (2007) - Yuuki Kobayashi
- Hanazakari no Kimitachi e (2007) - Itsuki Kamishinjo
- Saito-san (2008) - Toshio Narahara
- Cafe Kichijoji de (2008) - Jun Ichinomiya
- 14-sai ~ Chihara Junior Tatta Hitori no Tatakai (2009) - Dai-chan
- Gine Sanfujinka no Onna-tachi (2009)
- Sign (2011)
- Kaizoku Sentai Gokaiger (2011-2012) - Gai Ikari/Gokai Silver
- Garo: Yami o Terasu Mono (2013) - Takeru Jakuzure/Zen the Flame Sword Knight
- Doubutsu Sentai Zyuohger (2016) - Gai Ikari/Gokai Silver (Episodes 28 and 29)
- Short Program (2022) - Tomio Akahori (Episode 3)

=== Stage ===
- Hakuōki Musical (2012–15) - Tōdō Heisuke
- Messiah "Dō no Shō" (2013) - Junya Higayama

=== Anime ===
- Majestic Prince (2013) - Ataru Suruga
- Digimon Adventure tri. (2015–18) - Jo Kido
- After the Rain (2018) - Takashi Yoshizawa
- Digimon Adventure: Last Evolution Kizuna (2020) - Jo Kido
- Trigun Stampede (2023) - Knives Millions

=== Video games ===
- Ensemble Stars! (2015) - Mitsuru Tenma
