= Yui Koike =

Japanese actress

- 小池 唯
- Born: April 4, 1991 (age 35); Saitama Prefecture, Japan
- Occupation: Actress
- Years active: 2006–present
- Height: 160 cm (5 ft 3 in)

Yui Koike (小池 唯, Koike Yui; born April 4, 1991) is a Japanese actress and former gravure idol. She is known for her role as Ahim de Famille/Gokai Pink in the 2011 Super Sentai series Kaizoku Sentai Gokaiger. She was a member of the idol group Tomato n'Pine. She is currently affiliated with Weeds Company.

== Filmography ==
=== TV series ===
Year	Title	Role	Other notes
2009	Tomica Hero: Rescue Fire	Idol reporter	Episode 12
2009	Koike San Shimai	Yui	
2009	Boku no Himitsu Heiki	Juri Kakiuchi	Episode 8
2010	Kaibutsu-kun		Episode 1
2010	Manpuku Shōjo Dragonet	Sayaka Fujimura	Episode 9
2010	Kamen Rider W	Yui Aoyama	Final episode
2011	Atsui zo! Nekogaya!!	Ikumi Oshino	Main role
2011	Kaizoku Sentai Gokaiger	Ahim de Famille/Gokai Pink	Main role
2014	Keishichō Sōsa Ikka 9-gakari Season 9	Haruka Tachibana	Episode 6
2015	Love Riron	Azusa	Episodes 4–6 and final
2016	Doubutsu Sentai Zyuohger	Ahim de Famille/Gokai Pink	Episodes 28 and 29
2017	Keishichō Sōsa Ichikachō Season 2	Yui Aikawa	Episode 4
2019	Keiji Zero	Mizuki Tachibana	Episode 7
2020	Kiken na Venus		Final episode

=== Films ===
Year	Title	Role	Other notes
2009	Miss Machiko	Nana Sakuragaoka	
2010	Gachinko Shissō Jōtō	Ami Nakamura	
2011	Tensou Sentai Goseiger vs. Shinkenger: Epic on Ginmaku	Gokai Pink (voice)	Cameo, voice role
2011	Gokaiger Goseiger Super Sentai 199 Hero Great Battle	Ahim de Famille/Gokai Pink	Main role
2011	Kaizoku Sentai Gokaiger the Movie: The Flying Ghost Ship	Ahim de Famille/Gokai Pink	Main role
2012	Kaizoku Sentai Gokaiger vs. Space Sheriff Gavan: The Movie	Ahim de Famille/Gokai Pink	Main role
2012	Kamen Rider × Super Sentai: Super Hero Taisen	Ahim de Famille/Gokai Pink, Go-On Yellow (voice)	
2012	The Joker Game	Minako Yokoe	
2013	Tokumei Sentai Go-Busters vs. Kaizoku Sentai Gokaiger: The Movie	Ahim de Famille/Gokai Pink	
2013	Daily Lives of High School Boys	Convenience store clerk	
2013	Ryukyu Battle Royale	Misako Shinjo	
2021	Kaizoku Sentai: Ten Gokaiger	Ahim de Famille/Gokai Pink	
