= Kazuki Shimizu =

Japanese actor (born 1990)

- 清水 一希
- Born: April 24, 1990 (age 36); Tokyo, Japan
- Occupation: Actor
- Years active: 2008-2022
- Height: 173 cm (5 ft 8 in)

Kazuki Shimizu (清水 一希, Shimizu Kazuki; born April 24, 1990) is a Japanese actor best known for his role as Don Dogoier/Gokai Green in the 2011 Super Sentai series Kaizoku Sentai Gokaiger. He was a member of the Naked Boyz acting troupe. He made his debut in 2008 for the 21st Junon Superboy Contest. He is currently affiliated with Flip Up.

== Filmography ==
=== TV Drama ===
- Kaizoku Sentai Gokaiger (2011–2012) - Don Dogoier/Gokai Green
- Doubutsu Sentai Zyuohger (2016) - Don Dogoier/Gokai Green (Episodes 28 and 29)

=== Film ===
- Gokusen: The Movie (2009)
- 2channel no Noroi (2010) - Keigo
- Tensou Sentai Goseiger vs. Shinkenger: Epic on Ginmaku (2011) - Gokai Green (voice only)
- Gokaiger Goseiger Super Sentai 199 Hero Great Battle (2011) - Don Dogoier/Gokai Green
- Kaizoku Sentai Gokaiger the Movie: The Flying Ghost Ship (2011) - Don Dogoier/Gokai Green
- Kaizoku Sentai Gokaiger vs. Space Sheriff Gavan: The Movie (2012) - Don Dogoier/Gokai Green
- Kamen Rider × Super Sentai: Super Hero Taisen (2012) - Don Dogoier/Gokai Green, Kamen Rider X (voice only)
- Bingo (2012) - Masaya Kumada
- Tokumei Sentai Go-Busters vs. Kaizoku Sentai Gokaiger: The Movie (2013) - Don Dogoier/Gokai Green
- Koi Suru Haguruma (2013) - Kenta Amagi
- Busjack (2014) - Keisuke Ōtomo
- Tenshi ni I'm Fine (2016) - Yūya Asahi
- Kaizoku Sentai: Ten Gokaiger (2021) - Don Dogoier/Gokai Green

=== Video ===
- A Day of One Hero (2011)

=== Stage ===
- KEIKI ~Natsume Souseki Suirichou (2008)
- La Corda D'Oro Stella Musical (2010) - Sui Midorikawa
