= Tsuyoshi Matsubara =

- Origin: Tokyo
- Genres: Anison
- Years active: 1999 - present
- Label: Nippon Columbia
- Website: Blog

Tsuyoshi Matsubara (松原 剛志, Matsubara Tsuyoshi), is a Japanese singer and actor originally from Tokyo. He is a founding member of the vocal group Project DMM and in recent years has been a member of the Nippon Columbia group Project.R, gaining prominence as the vocalist for Kaizoku Sentai Gokaiger's opening theme song, and more recently for the ending theme of Uchu Sentai Kyuranger. Matsubara has also appeared in various musical productions in Japan, including performing as Enjolras in a production of Les Misérables and Jack in Into the Woods. He began being interested in an anison career when he was 16 and was taught by Ichirou Mizuki before debuting in the Ultra Series vocal ensemble Project DMM.
