= List of Kaizoku Sentai Gokaiger episodes =

This is a list of episodes for Kaizoku Sentai Gokaiger, the 35th installment of the long running Japanese Super Sentai franchise. As a special anniversary season, some episodes pay tribute to past Sentai seasons, with their titles following the same title theme as the corresponding season.

== Episodes ==
No.	Title	Written by	Original release date
1	"Space Pirates Appear"; Transliteration: "Uchū Kaizoku Arawaru" (Japanese: 宇宙海賊現る)	Naruhisa Arakawa	February 13, 2011
The Space Empire Zangyack invades Earth, but the first 34 Super Sentai teams sacrifice their powers to destroy their first invasion force in what will become known as the "Legend War". Sometime later, a small crew of space pirates, the Gokaigers, travel to Earth in their ship, the Gokai Galleon, after their navigation robot Navi confirms they will find the Greatest Treasure in the Universe there. Despite learning of a Zangyack fleet also heading to Earth, the pirates' leader Captain Marvelous refuses to abandon their quest. Upon making planet fall, they fail to discover the treasure's location and obtain Earth money to have lunch. Meanwhile, the Zangyack's flagship, the Gigant Horse, arrives near Earth's orbit, where an infuriated Commander Warz Gill orders an all-out assault with the empire's new invasion force. As Action Commander Shikabanen leads Gomin Sailors in attacking a group of civilians, the Gokaigers initially choose not to intervene before changing their minds due to the Zangyack conquering their planets. Using Ranger Keys, the pirates utilize their powers and those of three Sentai teams to destroy the Zangyack forces. Amidst the civilians' praise, Marvelous insists he and his team only saved them because the villains ruined his lunch.
2	"The Worth of This Planet"; Transliteration: "Kono Hoshi no Kachi" (Japanese: この星の価値)	Naruhisa Arakawa	February 20, 2011
In flashbacks, Aka Red entrusts Marvelous with the Ranger Keys and Navi before sacrificing himself to save him from Zangyack forces. In the present, Marvelous orders Navi to use her fortune-telling abilities to provide a clue to the Greatest Treasure. When she says they must ask a man in black, the pirates eventually encounter a boy dressed in a black school uniform, who expresses knowledge of the previous Sentai teams and claims he can help them. After Marvelous reveals their powers are derived from Ranger Keys, the boy steals one of them and escapes. Marvelous gives chase, with the pirates' diplomat Ahim de Famille joining him to keep him from going overboard. Upon finding the boy, he reveals his grandfather died during the Legend War. Recalling his past, Marvelous gives the boy his Mobilate, allowing him to turn into Shinken Red and fight the Zangyack. After Action Commander Bongan defeats him, Marvelous takes his equipment back and defeats the monster with his crewmates' help. After Zangyack scientist Insarn enlarges Bongan, the Gokaigers summon their mecha GokaiOh to kill him. Afterward, the pirates grow skeptical about Navi's clue while a man in a black cloak watches them from afar.
3	"Changing Courage into Magic ~Maagi Magi Go Gokai~"; Transliteration: "Yūki o Mahō ni Kaete ~Māji Maji Gō Gōkai~" (Japanese: 勇気を魔法に変えて～マージ・マジ・ゴー・ゴーカイ～)	Naruhisa Arakawa	February 27, 2011
The Gokaigers engage a Zangyack battleship helmed by Action Commander Salamandam in combat before crashing. The two groups continue fighting until the alien uses his eruption-inducing powers to separate the pirates. While searching for their crewmates, Marvelous and his anxious technician Don "Doc" Dogoier encounter the cloaked man, the Magirangers' leader Kai Ozu, who reveals the pirates have yet to unlock the Ranger Keys' full potential and asks that they follow him without using their powers in exchange for information on the Greatest Treasure. As the pair do so, Kai tests them using his magic and help from Heavenly Saint Flagel all throughout. Marvelous passes all of Kai's challenges until the other Gokaigers' fight with Salamandam interferes with the final test. After Don overcomes his fears to rescue Marvelous and pass the test, Kai reveals he was testing their courage, explaining that they can channel their courage through the Magiranger Keys and need to earn all 34 Sentai teams' "Great Powers" to reach the treasure. The Gokaigers summon the Magirangers' Great Power, Magi Dragon, to help them kill the enlarged Salamandam. As a satisfied Kai and Flagel leave, the pirates apologize to Navi for doubting her.
4	"Blue Pirate Friend"; Transliteration: "Nani no Tame no Nakama" (Japanese: 何のための仲間)	Naruhisa Arakawa	March 6, 2011
After failing to manifest more Great Powers from their other Ranger Keys, the Gokaigers realize they cannot take short cuts in earning them. While picking up provisions, Ahim and Marvelous' first mate Joe Gibken fight Action Commander Zodomas, who attracts the latter's attention with his swordsmanship skills and overpowers the pirates before leaving. Joe spends dinner and the following night honing his own swordsmanship to counter Zodomas' fighting style while Ahim watches over him despite the pirates' lookout Luka Millfy telling her to accept his ways out of friendship. The next day, Ahim gives Joe her Gokai Saber for his rematch with Zodomas, who reveals he had Insarn genetically-modify him in preparation. Upon their arrival, the other Gokaigers give Joe their Gokai Sabers so he can defeat Zodomas. After killing the enlarged Action Commander, Joe modestly presents a "thank you" cake to his crewmates.
5	"Judgment Pirates"; Transliteration: "Jajjimento Pairētsu" (Japanese: ジャッジメント･パイレーツ)	Naruhisa Arakawa	March 20, 2011 (Note: This episode was originally scheduled to air on March 13, 2011, but TV Asahi postponed the airing of this and several other television programs to air news coverage on the Tōhoku earthquake and tsunami.)
After Navi reveals they should find the police for their next clue to the Greatest Treasure, they travel to the nearest police station, but Marvelous is handcuffed by the Dekarangers' Marika "Jasmine" Reimon, who intends to arrest the pirates. Marvelous orders the others to escape while he is pursued and detained by Jasmine's superior, Doggie Kruger. Before he can take him into custody, the pair stumble onto a Zangyack operation overseen by Action Commander Buramudo. Upon being discovered, Kruger is injured while saving Marvelous, though he refuses the pirate's help out of distrust and leaves him behind to stop Buramudo. Realizing Kruger is heading into certain death, Marvelous saves him. In return and choosing to have faith in his ways, Kruger releases him from his bonds. Reuniting with his team, Marvelous leads the Gokaigers in summoning the Dekarangers' Great Power, the Pat Striker, to help them kill an enlarged Buramudo and thwart his plot. The next morning, they escort Kruger back to police custody and are met by his subordinate Banban "Ban" Akaza, who clears them of the charges made against them.
6	"The Most Important Thing"; Transliteration: "Ichiban Daiji na Mono" (Japanese: 一番大事なもの)	Naruhisa Arakawa	March 27, 2011
While shopping with Don, Luka intends to buy a special ring, but learns a spoiled girl named Komaki Kasugai bought the jewelry store it was in, to her tycoon father Kozo Kasugai's dismay. While complaining to Komaki about her spending spree and views on money, Luka gets hired by her, with the ring she wanted as payment. However, Luka is upset to learn that she is to look after Komaki. While working for the Kasugais, Luka learns that they were originally poor until Kozo discovered a strange meteorite that contained a gold tree. Meanwhile, the Zangyack Empire sends Action Commander Nanonanoda to steal the gold tree to fund their invasion. After driving him off, Luka confronts Komaki for not warning Kozo, only to learn that Komaki detests her current lifestyle, infuriating Luka. That night, Luka talks to Joe about how she needs money to fulfill a dream of her. The next day, Nanonanoda sets the Kasugais' mansion on fire and unknowingly destroys the gold tree. While the other Gokaigers intervene, Luka protects the Kasugais, during which she helps them reconcile and secretly steals the ring before rejoining her teammates to kill Nanonanoda.
7	"Niki-Niki! Kenpō Lesson"; Transliteration: "Niki-Niki! Kenpō Shugyō" (Japanese: ニキニキ！拳法修行)	Junko Kōmura	April 3, 2011
For their next clue to the Greatest Treasure, Navi says they must find the "tiger child". However, the Gokaigers' search is interrupted by Cosmic Kenpō Master Pachacamac XIII. Ahim and Don are outmatched by his unique fighting style while the others narrowly defeat him. Later, while discussing their combat skills, the pair encounter the Gekirangers' Jyan Kandou, with Ahim joining his training session while a fearful Don leaves. That night, he discovers Marvelous, Joe, and Luka all trained themselves in differing manners and resolves to become as strong as them. The next day, Don joins Ahim in studying under Kandou while the other Gokaigers resume their fight with Pachacamac, who was modified by Insarn and granted new powers. Learning that their crewmates are in trouble, Ahim and Don discover Kandou is the tiger child before reuniting with their friends and using the Gekirangers' Great Power, the Geki Beasts, to kill Pachacamac. As Don continues to find his courage, Kandou's teacher Master Xia Fu questions the former's unwavering trust in the pirates, though Kandou remains resolute.
8	"Little Spy Tactics"; Transliteration: "Supai Shōsakusen" (Japanese: スパイ小作戦)	Naruhisa Arakawa	April 10, 2011
After the Gokaigers destroy more of his forces, Warz takes his frustration out on his subordinates before leaving to find another Action Commander. More concerned about the Gokaigers' use of the 34 Sentai teams' powers, Zangyack strategist Damaras secretly sends the Sneak Brothers, Elder and Younger, to learn more about the pirates' goals. Despite multiple failed attempts, Elder eventually stows away on the Gokai Galleon and overhears the Gokaigers discussing the Greatest Treasure in the Universe before he is forced to hide when they notice Navi has gone missing and frantically search for her. Upon returning from the beach and being tied up by the worried pirates, Navi reveals their next clue involves a flying island. Elder reveals himself, gloating that he knows about their intentions until Joe uses a baseball bat to swat him off the ship. The Sneak Brothers reunite to fight the Gokaigers, only for Elder to be sent flying while Younger is killed in battle. Meanwhile, Damaras breaks off from the main fleet to find the island before the rest of Zangyack do.
9	"The Lion, Runs"; Transliteration: "Shishi, Kakeru" (Japanese: 獅子、走る)	Junko Kōmura	April 17, 2011
The Gokaigers eventually stumble onto the Sky Island Animarium. Upon making landfall, they fight a Zangyack squad sent by Damaras and led by Action Commander Bauza before their conflict draws the attention of Gao Lion, who knocks them all off the Animarium. The pirates use the Jetmen's powers to safely descend, though Bauza injures Ahim while using a Zugomin officer to break his fall. The pirates start to make their way back until they are approached and warned by Kakeru Shishi that they will never gain Gao Lion's power as they are now, though Marvelous, Joe, and Luka refuse to listen. While tending to Ahim's wounds, Kakeru reveals he previously led the Gaorangers and worked with Gao Lion. Don begs him for his team's Great Power, but Kakeru reveals it is Gao Lion's choice. Don and Ahim defend their crewmates, stating that they seek more than treasure before rejoining them. Seeing the Gokaigers using his team's powers to save civilians and fight Bauza, Kakeru changes his mind while Gao Lion allows the pirates to summon him and help them kill an enlarged Bauza. Kakeru leaves, wishing his partner luck with his new allies.
10	"Card Game"; Transliteration: "Toranpu Shōbu" (Japanese: トランプ勝負)	Kento Shimoyama	April 24, 2011
While playing poker, the Gokaigers are alerted to the presence of a Zangyack fleet led by a green battleship. After driving them off, Joe reveals the green ship is part of Zangyack's "Special Destruction Unit", which wields ammunition made of a rare material capable of destroying planets called Gigalorium. Luka suggests she and Joe infiltrate the ship to steal the Gigalorium. Using their powers and Gomin disguises, the pair successfully infiltrate the ship until they are brought to the break room for a poker game, which draws the attention of the ship's captain Yokubarido, who exposes the pirates' subterfuge. Being a gambler, Yokubarido offers to let them go if they can beat him in poker. Otherwise, they must surrender to him. Joe agrees to play him and wins. Refusing to accept this, Yokubarido orders his troops to kill the pirates, only to learn too late that the pair distracted him from the other Gokaigers stealing the Gigalorium. After destroying his ship, the Gokaigers reunite to kill Yokubarido before using GokaiOh to throw the Gigalorium stockpile at the Zangyack fleet, destroying several of their ships. Afterward, Joe discovers Luka cheated to help him win, to his dismay.
11	"The Serious Rebellion"; Transliteration: "Shinken Ōsōdō" (Japanese: 真剣大騒動)	Naruhisa Arakawa	May 1, 2011
In flashbacks, Joe worked for Zangyack's military under his commanding officer Sid Bamick. In the present, Navi warns the Gokaigers to beware of a "sa-mu-r-ai" per her latest clue to the Greatest Treasure. While pondering this, the pirates are confronted by Kaoru Shiba, who demands the Shinkenger Ranger Keys from them. Marvelous fights her until Joe agrees to face her in a duel. Meanwhile, Warz is visited by Zangyack Imperial Guardsman, Deratsueiger, which inspires Warz to travel to Earth to personally oversee his forces' next attack. Interrupting the duel, Deratsueiger and Warz's cyborg bodyguard Barizorg fight the Gokaigers, with Joe recognizing the latter's fighting style as Sid's. Warz reveals Sid was converted into Barizorg and had his memories erased for betraying the Zangyack Empire. Marvelous gets injured protecting a stunned Joe from Barizorg before deflecting his sword, with a stray shot injuring Warz. Both parties retreat to heal their wounded, with Kaoru lending aid to the Gokaigers. While staying with them, her retainer Toshizo Tanba suggests stealing the Shinkenger keys, but she rebuffs him. Meanwhile, a guilt-ridden Joe ponders what Sid has become before leaving to settle his personal affairs alone.
12	"The Guaranteed Showy Samurai"; Transliteration: "Kiwametsuki Hade na Samurai" (Japanese: 極付派手侍)	Naruhisa Arakawa	May 8, 2011
In flashbacks, Joe left Zangyack after refusing to kill a group of innocent children. After Sid got captured while helping him escape, Joe later encountered and was recruited by Marvelous. In the present, upon discovering Joe's disappearance, the remaining Gokaigers grow worried until Marvelous tells them to stop, confident that he will return. Meanwhile, Joe confronts Barizorg while the latter is retrieving his sword. Despite learning the truth, Barizorg refuses to listen, defeats Joe, and leaves, causing the pirate to realize Sid is truly dead. Meanwhile, Kaoru learns why Joe became a pirate and recognizes the Gokaigers' bonds before Deratsueiger returns to Earth to kill the pirates for injuring Warz. Kaoru offers to help, but Marvelous declines. Joe arrives soon after, with Kaoru giving him a Secret Disk to ensure victory. Together, the Gokaigers use the Shinkengers' Great Power, Modikara, and Gao Lion to kill an enlarged Deratsueiger. Afterward, Marvelous collapses from starvation, leading to the others carrying him to a place to eat while Joe appreciates being back with his friends.
13	"Tell Me the Way"; Transliteration: "Michi o Oshiete" (Japanese: 道を教えて)	Junko Kōmura	May 15, 2011
While exploring a marketplace, Ahim is kidnapped at gunpoint by Eikichi Nashida, who tries to ransom her. However, she disarms him of the toy gun he was using. Begging for her forgiveness, he confesses that he needs money to pay back a mobster. Hoping to help him, she calls her crewmates for help, but unknowingly causes them to believe she was kidnapped. While trying to clear up the misunderstanding, Nashida and Ahim are attacked by Action Commander Zaggai, who seeks a rare metal called Poisole capable of producing neurotoxin when exposed to electricity. Noticing that Nashida has the Poisole, Ahim spirits him away, with Zaggai in pursuit. When her friends arrive and notice signs of the Zangyack's forces, they assume their enemies kidnapped Ahim. While regrouping, Ahim confirms that Nashida has the Poisole and assures him that he is not worthless, revealing she outlived her people while taking on a new path. Zaggai and the other Gokaigers converge on their location. The former attempts to explain his side of the story, but Ahim leads her crewmates in killing him. Afterward, she throws the Poisole into the sea, where the saltwater neutralizes it, before wishing Nashida luck on his journey.
14	"Now More Traffic Safety"; Transliteration: "Ima mo Kōtsū Anzen" (Japanese: いまも交通安全)	Yoshio Urasawa	May 22, 2011
While taking a nap, Navi's dream causes her to reveal the Gokaigers' next clue: learning traffic safety laws. Meanwhile, Insarn reviews Zaggai's activities and falls in love with a man he encountered, Kyosuke Jinnai. She orders Action Commander Jerashid to bring him to her, unaware of his unrequited crush on her. However, his first attempt at kidnapping Kyosuke is thwarted by the Gokaigers. Following this, Kyosuke thanks the pirates, reveals he previously led the Carrangers, and became a struggling actor to educate children on traffic safety. Upon learning of their quest to gain the Carrangers' Great Power, he agrees to help in exchange for them taking part in his acting troupe. The Gokaigers leave to find another Carranger, but Kyosuke pursues them until Jerashid, having discovered Insarn is love with him, tries to kill Kyosuke. At Kyosuke's insistence, the Gokaigers use the Carrangers' powers to fight Jerashid until Kyosuke convinces him to express his feelings for Insarn. The Gokaigers subsequently send Jerashid flying back to the Gigant Horse, where Insarn has him thrown out with the trash. Afterward, the pirates are forced to take part in Kyosuke's traffic safety show for his team's Great Power, their team pose.
15	"A Privateer Appears"; Transliteration: "Shiryakusen Arawaru" (Japanese: 私掠船現る)	Junko Kōmura	May 29, 2011
In flashbacks, the Red Pirates — Aka Red, Marvelous, and Basco Ta Jolokia — roamed the galaxy to gather the 34 Sentai teams' powers and turn them into Ranger Keys until Basco sold them out to the Zangyack Empire. In the present, Marvelous orders Navi to reveal their next clue. However, she senses impending danger. Meanwhile, a red Zangyack ship, the Free Joker, connects with their fleet, which Warz discovers is captained by one of their privateers. The Gokaigers soon encounter the privateer, Basco. When he announces his own intent to claim the Greatest Treasure in the Universe, Marvelous attacks him until Damaras sends three Zugomin to show Basco the Gokaigers' capabilities. Forced to break off, Marvelous leads his crew in destroying the Zangyack officers. Despite his reluctance, the pirates learn of Marvelous' past before Basco calls him to settle their differences in a duel. During the fight, Basco reveals he obtained fifteen Sixth Hero Ranger Keys in the intervening years and brings five of them to life to overwhelm Marvelous. While he ordered them not to, the other Gokaigers join the fray and defeat the simulacra before they are captured by Basco's remaining ten Ranger Keys.
16	"Clash! Sentai vs. Sentai"; Transliteration: "Gekitotsu! Sentai Bāsasu Sentai" (Japanese: 激突！戦隊VS戦隊)	Junko Kōmura	June 5, 2011
Having recovered the five Ranger Keys Basco used, a frustrated Marvelous fails to track his crew or the Free Joker. He later receives another call from Basco, who offers to trade Marvelous' ship, Ranger Keys, and Navi for his crew or else Basco will turn them in for the bounties Zangyack placed on them. Recalling the day he joined the Red Pirates, Marvelous regains his confidence and seemingly agrees to Basco's terms. Sometime later, the pirate and privateer meet. Suddenly, Marvelous scatters the Ranger Keys and his Mobilate, leading to Don acquiring the latter and the Shinken Green Key before using both to free himself and his comrades. As they regain their own Mobilates and Navi recovers the Ranger Keys, Basco brings his remaining Sixth Hero Ranger Keys to life to fight the Gokaigers, who eventually defeat and recover them as well. Defeated, Basco orders his pet space monkey Sally to release the giant Liquidroid Wateru, from her stomach hatch. After summoning GokaiOh to defeat it, the Gokaigers assure Marvelous they do not hold anything against him. Unbeknownst to them, an undeterred Basco forms a new plan with his ten Extra Hero Ranger Keys.
17	"The Awesome Silver Pirate"; Transliteration: "Sugoi Gin'iro no Otoko" (Japanese: 凄い銀色の男)	Naruhisa Arakawa	June 12, 2011
Sometime after defeating the Black Cross King and earning eleven of the Sentai teams' Great Powers, (Note: As depicted in the film Gokaiger Goseiger Super Sentai 199 Hero Great Battle.) Navi tells the Gokaigers their next clue involves a man in silver. Their search leads to a Super Sentai fanboy named Gai Ikari before they fight Action Commander Arumadon. Despite initially being overwhelmed by his Aruma Barrier, Don forces the alien to retreat after damaging his collar. Having watched the battle, Gai introduces himself and asks to join the pirates. They decline before Navi berates them for forgetting their search. Meanwhile, Warz secretly has Arumadon's collar rigged to explode and creates a large weak spot for the Gokaigers to exploit before sending Arumadon back to Earth to fight them. Joining the fray, Gai transforms into Gokai Silver, deduces Warz's plot, and safely removes and detonates the collar before killing Arumadon. Realizing that Gai is the silver man they have been searching for, the Gokaigers ask how he obtained his powers.
18	"The Big Abare With the Dinosaur Robot Drill"; Transliteration: "Kyōryū Robotto Doriru de Ō Abare" (Japanese: 恐竜ロボットドリルで大アバレ)	Naruhisa Arakawa	June 26, 2011
In flashbacks, Gai was hospitalized after saving a little girl from an oncoming truck. In his dreams, he was visited by the ghosts of the Zyurangers' Dragon Ranger, the Timerangers' Time Fire, and the Abarangers' Abare Killer, who gave him the means to transform into Gokai Silver and access to their respective teams' Great Powers. In the present, the Gokaigers take Gai to the Gokai Galleon, where he reveals his origins and his inability to summon the Great Powers. Marvelous confiscates his transformation equipment, believing he does not understand the gravity of fighting the Zangyack Empire, and asks if he has anything unique to offer to his crew. The next day, Gai responds to a Zangyack attack led by Action Commander Osogain despite not having his powers. Seeing his unwavering courage and determination, the Gokaigers arrive and return his equipment before joining him in defeating Osogain. After the alien is enlarged, Gai uses the Timerangers, Zyurangers, and Abarangers' Great Powers to summon the GouZyu Drill time jet from the 31st century before transforming it into GouZyu Rex and GouZyuJin to destroy the Zangyack forces. Afterward, he is made a cabin boy, but looks forward to working with the Gokaigers.
19	"Armor of the 15 Warriors"; Transliteration: "Jūgo Senshi no Yoroi" (Japanese: １５戦士の鎧)	Naruhisa Arakawa	July 3, 2011
After finalizing his membership, Gai impresses the Gokaigers with his unique skill set, though an uncertain Don grows more insecure about his place on the crew. Meanwhile, a reinvigorated Warz sends Action Commander Worian to remove people's skeletons and leave them in a catatonic state. The Gokaigers engage him using the Go-ongers' powers, but Gai is left unable to decide which of the Go-on Wings he wants to be. Whilst daydreaming about meeting them, he finds himself with a hybrid Go-on Wings key and uses both of their powers simultaneously to fight Worian until the alien removes most of the Gokaigers' skeletons and escapes. After recovering their teammates, Don admits his jealousy towards Gai, who leaves on his own to find Worian. After Navi assures him he is the better man, Don finds and reconciles with Gai before telling him to combine all of the Sixth Hero Ranger Keys while he holds off Worian. Soon enough, Gai creates the Gold Anchor Key and transforms into Gokai Silver Gold Mode to defeat Worian, restoring his victims to normal, before killing an enlarged Worian with GouZyuJin. Later, Don's insecurity returns when he learns Zangyack put a higher bounty on Gai than him.
20	"The Lost Forest"; Transliteration: "Mayoi no Mori" (Japanese: 迷いの森)	Junko Kōmura	July 10, 2011
After Navi's latest clue to the Greatest Treasure says they must find a warrior in a sealed forest, Gai deduces they need to find the Gingamen. The Gokaigers' search soon leads to Gingamen member Hyuuga as he is being attacked by Basco, who brings his Extra Hero Ranger Keys to life to overwhelm the pirates, though they are later saved by Hyuuga's brother and the Gingamen's leader, Ryouma. While getting Hyuuga to safety, Gai claims he is a novice compared to him. Hyuuga then asks Gai for his Gokaiger powers so he can protect the world again. Before Gai can answer, Basco finds them and attempts to steal the Gingamen's Great Power from Hyuuga before Marvelous intervenes. Basco summons four Extra Heroes, including Hyuuga's Black Knight form, to fight the Gokaigers. Inspired by Marvelous' refusal to relinquish his dream despite long odds, Gai refuses Hyuuga, who reveals he was testing his self-worth. Joining the battle, Gai recovers the Black Knight Key, though Sally steals back the other three before unleashing the giant Moonroid Tsukki to cover Basco's escape. After the Gokaigers use their mecha to destroy it, Hyuuga gives Gai the Black Knight Key and his team's Great Power.
21	"The Heart of an Adventure"; Transliteration: "Bōkensha no Kokoro" (Japanese: 冒険者の心)	Kento Shimoyama	July 17, 2011
Vexed by Basco's ability to steal Great Powers, Marvelous berates Navi for not providing more accurate clues. They are soon interrupted by the Boukengers' leader, Satoru Akashi, who asks for the Gokaigers' help in searching for a treasure capable of resurrecting the dead called the "Heart of Hades". Though they already acquired the Boukengers' Great Power, Marvelous reluctantly agrees. During their quest, the group learn Insarn also seeks the artifact for Zangyack's use. Joe, Don, Ahim, and Gai fight Insarn while Marvelous, Luka, and Akashi proceed to a nearby cave, where they fail to stop a Jaryuu from sacrificing itself to use the Heart of Hades to resurrect the Boukengers' enemy, Ryuuwon. Trapping the trio in the cave, Ryuuwon attacks the others and drives off Insarn. After Satoru explains the adventure the Gokaigers share is its own treasure, Marvelous recalls a fond memory of Aka Red before helping Luka blast their way out. Reunited, the Gokaigers use the Boukengers' powers to remove the Heart of Hades before using the latter's Great Power, DaiBouken, to kill an enlarged Ryuuwon once more. As the Gokaigers sail off, Akashi questions Aka Red's intentions.
22	"A Promise on a Shooting Star"; Transliteration: "Hoshi Furu Yakusoku" (Japanese: 星降る約束)	Naruhisa Arakawa	July 24, 2011 (Note: This episode was the final Super Sentai episode to air on analog television in most of Japan. Analog television broadcasts ceased at noon that day.)
Gai reveals he created a Super Sentai encyclopedia to help his team research the previous teams, though Joe is disinterested. He leaves to pick up food, but Gai joins him so they can get better acquainted. Along the way, the pair encounter a boy named Shota traveling to Kamikura Mountain and Action Commander Stargull, who possesses a black stone. After the pirates overwhelm and repel Stargull, they realize Shota's leg was wounded in the crossfire. They offer treatment, but the boy is determined to fulfill a promise he made to his friend Daigo to watch shooting stars on Kamikura Mountain. Dismissing this notion, Joe mends Shota's leg and tells him to go. Upon returning to the others, Don reveals Stargull's stone is one half of the Reiseki Warabe-ishi, a relic that grants the user limitless power when made whole. Realizing the other half is on Kamikura Mountain, the Gokaigers rush out to save Shota. Though Stargull successfully absorbs the stones' energy and gets enlarged by Warz, the Gokaigers eventually kill him. By sunset, Shota reaches the summit, where the Gokaigers join him in watching shooting stars.
23	"People's Lives Are the Future of the World"; Transliteration: "Hito no Inochi wa Chikyū no Mirai" (Japanese: 人の命は地球の未来)	Junko Kōmura	July 31, 2011
In flashbacks, Luka helped orphans despite living in poverty due to the Zangyack Empire, though her younger sister Lia died of poor health conditions. In the present, Navi reveals the Gokaigers' next clue involves helping others. Since all of the previous Sentai teams helped people, the pirates help civilians in a nearby town. Amidst this, Luka and Ahim encounter GoGoFive member and EMT Matsuri Tatsumi and accompany her, during which they fend off attacks by Basco's simulacra. Realizing she is being targeted for her team's Great Power, Matsuri offers to give herself up, but the pirates refuse to let her do so. Motivated by her memories of Lia, Luka tells Matsuri to focus on her job while Ahim uses Magi Pink's magic to trick Basco into letting Matsuri go. The pirates are overwhelmed by the simulacra until their crewmates arrive to help defeat them and drive off Basco. Sally steals back Basco's Ranger Keys before unleashing the giant Fireroid Meran. Having received the GoGoFive team's Great Power, the Gokaigers use it to summon fire hoses and weaken Meran before destroying it with GokaiOh. Afterward, Luka and Ahim check on Matsuri's charges.
24	"Foolish Earthlings"; Transliteration: "Oroka na Chikyūjin" (Japanese: 愚かな地球人)	Yoshio Urasawa	August 7, 2011
While going out for takoyaki, the Gokaigers learn the store's owner, Nobuyuki, is working with Jerashid, who left Zangyack to become his pet. They start to leave, but Gai convinces them to stay and see how it plays out. Meanwhile, Action Commander Sen-Den and a platoon of Gomin litter the city with Zangyack propaganda posters until they encounter Jerashid and Nobuyuki and attack them. The Gokaigers reluctantly intervene to take out the Gomin while Sen-Den escapes to borrow a weapon from Damaras. After Gai has Nobuyuki apologize to Jerashid for treating him like a pet, Don suggests Jerashid should become Nobuyuki's apprentice instead. Seeing the potential of selling takoyaki in space, Jerashid agrees. However, Nobuyuki's mother disapproves, wishing to preserve Earth culture. Suddenly, Sen-Den returns with a Zangyack bazooka and goes on a rampage. The Gokaigers ask the civilians and Jerashid to hide, but Nobuyuki's mother gets caught in the crossfire, leading to Jerashid injuring himself while saving her, convincing her that not all aliens are evil. After killing Sen-Den, the pirates learn Jerashid and Nobuyuki's mother eloped and were last heard running a rural onsen together with a baby on the way.
25	"Pirates and Ninjas"; Transliteration: "Kaizoku to Ninja" (Japanese: 海賊とニンジャ)	Naruhisa Arakawa	August 14, 2011
While briefing his crewmates on the previous Sentai teams' history and the 22 Great Powers they have collected, Gai fails to notice Marvelous, Joe, and Luka sneaking off to get ice cream. While they are out, the trio encounter Action Commander and space ninja Satarakura Jr., who reveals his intent to turn humans into chestnuts to power a missile. The pirates fight him, but are overwhelmed by his antics before his fellow space ninja, Sandaaru Jr., arrives to help him defeat them. When the other Gokaigers arrive, Satarakura Jr. opens a portal that pulls in the chestnuts he has made, Marvelous, Joe, and Luka and escapes, leaving Magerappa foot soldiers to distract the remaining Gokaigers while Sandaaru Jr. uses his powers to enlarge himself. Gai uses GouZyuJin to fight back, but is overwhelmed until Fuuraimaru arrives to help him kill Sandaaru Jr. Meanwhile, Don and Ahim receive help from three ninjas that Gai identifies as the Hurricanegers. The ninjas reveal only their Great Power can stop Satarakura Jr., but they do not trust the pirates and demand their powers back. Gai defends his crewmates, saying that the Ranger Keys would not be on Earth if it were not for Marvelous.
26	"Shushutto The Special"; Transliteration: "Shushutto Za Supesharu" (Japanese: シュシュッとTHE SPECIAL)	Naruhisa Arakawa	August 21, 2011
The Hurricanegers and Gai refuse to compromise until Don and Ahim agree to return the ninjas' powers in the hopes they can save their crewmates. As the Hurricanegers travel to the pocket dimension of Boki Space, they find Marvelous, Joe, and Luka being forced to participate in a game show hosted by Satarakura Jr., who reveals they must answer his questions correctly and make him say "Ping-Pong" to release his captives. However, the pirates refuse to answer the rigged questions despite the increasingly dangerous penalties. Stymied by this, the Hurricanegers attack Satarakura Jr., but he reveals he has strapped his chestnuts to an explosive before forcing them to participate as well. After Marvelous clarifies why he and his crewmates are not answering, the Hurricanegers eventually trick Satarakura Jr. into releasing his captives and negate Boki Space. Upon returning to the real world, the Gokaigers regroup and join forces with the Hurricanegers to fight Satarakura Jr. After the space ninja enlarges himself, the Hurricanegers return their Ranger Keys to the Gokaigers, who summon Fuuraimaru to help them kill Satarakura Jr. Afterward, the pirates and ninjas reconcile their differences.
27	"Switched Gokai Pirates"; Transliteration: "Itsumo yori Gōkai na Chenji" (Japanese: いつもより豪快なチェンジ)	Junko Kōmura	August 28, 2011
While out shopping, Luka and Don respond to Action Commander Regaeru and his troops attacking a foreigner. Joined by their crewmates, the pirates fend off the alien and escort the foreigner to safety. Desperate, Regaeru uses his body-swapping powers on Luka and Don before retreating. Warz simultaneously commends Regaeru for crippling the Gokaigers and reprimands him for failing in his mission to body-swap world leaders with their soldiers before ordering him to resume it. Meanwhile, Gai struggles to place the foreigner while the other Gokaigers try to figure out how to restore their crewmates. Luka leaves to resume her shopping spree, though Don tags along. While in each other's bodies, Luka becomes acquainted with two girls while Don struggles to escape jewelers who want to hire Luka and keeping her body safe. Concurrently, the others deduce the foreigner is the president of a western country who came for a peace conference and Regaeru's plot. Arriving at the conference, the Gokaigers repel Regaeru and his troops before Luka and Don defeat him, reversing his effect. After killing the enlarged Regaeru, Don fails to impress the girls Luka met, though she assures him he is cool in his own way.
28	"Wings are Eternal"; Transliteration: "Tsubasa wa Eien ni" (Japanese: 翼は永遠に)	Toshiki Inoue	September 4, 2011
In heaven's Golden Gate bar, Jetmen member Gai Yuki beats God in a card game and asks to be returned to Earth for one day. Meanwhile, the Gokaigers are confronted and defeated by intergalactic bounty hunter Kiaido, who Marvelous fears after he defeated him years prior, before being allowed to retreat. As the pirates recover, Navi reveals Kiaido can be defeated with a phoenix per their latest clue. After Gai deduces its connection to the Jetmen, Marvelous has everyone search for the team. Amidst this, Yuki attacks Marvelous, questioning the latter's abilities as a red warrior. Revealing his fear of Kiaido and stubbornness will stop him from acquiring the Jetmen's Great Power, he warns the Gokaigers to end their search and reveals his identity to them. Pursuing Yuki to a cemetery, Marvelous discovers his headstone, causing the pirates to realize Yuki's spirit came back to protect his teammates. Having retained his powers, Yuki fights Kiaido. Seeing this, Marvelous recognizes he is intent on fighting, even in death, and regains his courage. After the Gokaigers use the Jetmen's Great Power, the Jet Phoenix, to kill Kiaido, Yuki gives the pirates his blessing before returning to the Golden Gate.
29	"The Abare Quick-Changing New Combination"; Transliteration: "Abare Shichihenge de Shin Gattai" (Japanese: アバレ七変化で新合体)	Naruhisa Arakawa	September 11, 2011
When Warz comes down with a cold, Insarn deduces women's happiness is needed to cure him. Barizorg tasks Action Commander Dial with siphoning happiness, leading to Dial attacking newlyweds. After the Gokaigers confront him, Dial uses his size-changing powers to damage their mecha and overwhelm them until Ahim uses bug spray to drive him off. While the others focus on making repairs, Ahim and Gai plan a fake wedding to lure Dial into a trap and restore his victims. Though Dial overpowers Gai, Ahim uses a series of disguises to eventually succeed. Meanwhile, the other Gokaigers are met by Abaranger member Yukito Sanjyo and his wife Emiri, who reveal they can use the Abaranger Keys with both of their mecha. Due to Ahim lacking a counterpart in the Abarangers, Emiri gives her a homemade Abare Pink Key. The Gokaigers use the Abarangers' powers to fight Dial, but Ahim runs off, embarrassed by her appearance. After defeating Dial, the others combine their mecha to form GouZyu GokaiOh and kill the enlarged Action Commander. Afterward, Gai unknowingly embarrasses Ahim further when he shows the others pictures he took of her plan to restore Dial's victims.
30	"My Friend's Soul"; Transliteration: "Tomo no Tamashii Dake Demo" (Japanese: 友の魂だけでも)	Junko Kōmura	September 18, 2011
Upon learning Navi's latest clue to the Greatest Treasure involves a "skateboarding lion", Gai deduces it relates to the Livemen's Yellow Lion. Splitting up to find him, Joe and Ahim encounter Joh Ohara before all three discover a Zangyack scientist named Zaien attempting to kidnap a boxer. The pirates fend off the Zangyack forces while Joh rescues the boxer. Following this, they find a scanner containing technical specifications for turning people into cyborgs like Barizorg. Joe asks Joh to help reverse the process, but the latter discovers it is irreversible. As Joe laments not being able to save Sid, Joh relates how he was forced to fight his own friends turned enemies and developed a desire to stop history from repeating itself, even if it means rescuing his friends' souls. With renewed conviction, Joe realizes Joh is Yellow Lion. Meanwhile, the Gokaigers deduce Zaien's scheme to turn physically fit humans into cyborgs and free his captives before Joe joins them in using the Livemen's Great Power, Super Live Robo, to kill the enlarged Zaien. Afterward, Joe vows to defeat Barizorg to save Sid's soul.
31	"Crash!! The Secret Operators"; Transliteration: "Shōgeki!! Himitsu Sakusen" (Japanese: 衝撃!!秘密作戦)	Kento Shimoyama	September 25, 2011
Upon learning Basco stole the Changemen's Great Power, Ohranger members Goro Hoshino and Momo Maruo mount an operation to secure theirs. Meanwhile, the pirates are confused by Navi's latest clue, the word "uao". Believing it relates to a roller coaster, they head to an amusement park, where they encounter Momo. Once Gai explains who she is, she offers to give them her team's Great Power if they perform several tasks. The pirates agree until the tasks wear thin on them and Joe realizes she is hiding something. Concurrently, Goro tries to lure Basco into a trap, but Basco uses his simulacra to foil the plot. Goro orders Momo to give the Gokaigers their Great Power, but Marvelous refuses before leading the Gokaigers in rescuing Goro. Accepting the Gokaigers' ideals, the Ohrangers watch as the pirates earn their Great Power while defeating and recovering the remaining nine Extra Hero Ranger Keys before Sally can. Undeterred, Basco assumes a monstrous form and brutalizes the Gokaigers before revealing he has stolen the Changemen, Flashmen, and Maskmen's Great Powers. He subsequently spares them so they can continue their quest and make it easier for him to claim the Greatest Treasure in the Universe.
32	"One Power"; Transliteration: "Chikara o Hitotsu ni" (Japanese: 力を一つに)	Kento Shimoyama	October 2, 2011
Taking advantage of Basco weakening the Gokaigers, Damaras sends Action Commander Shieldon to kill them. With Gai temporarily out of action, the others refine their combat prowess while Don works on a new weapon. Taking inspiration from a young boy's determination to play on a soccer team while out on a walk, Don develops a prototype before he is ambushed by Shieldon. Despite being joined by his comrades, the pirates fail to break Shieldon's defenses while Don's prototype explodes, forcing them to retreat. Depressed, Don re-encounters the boy, who is also depressed because he did not make the starting lineup. After cheering him up, Don asks to borrow all of his crewmates' weapons. Despite the risk, they agree before facing Shieldon once more. Gai notices Don's weapon resembles the Ohrangers' Olé Bazooka, leading to the pair using the Ohrangers' Great Power, the power of teamwork, to complete the weapon. Christening it the Gokai Galleon Buster, Don takes it into battle, allowing the Gokaigers to defeat Shieldon before killing the enlarged Action Commander with GokaiOh. Afterward, Don reunites with the boy while the other pirates notice Don has become noticeably more confident.
33	"It's a Hero!!!"; Transliteration: "Hīrō daaa!!" (Japanese: ヒーローだァァッ!!)	Daisuke Ishibashi	October 9, 2011
Fully recovered, an overexcited Gai intends to make up for lost time. However, while helping his crewmates fight Action Commander Zakyura, who was sent to deplete Earth's food supply, Gai loses his transformation equipment to Zakyura, who eats it before retreating. As a depressed Gai walks off, he encounters the Dairangers' leader turned Chinese restaurant owner, Ryo. Hoping to raise his spirits, Ryo offers Gai his specialty gyōza, but Gai believes he cannot be a true hero without his equipment. Ryo starts to cheer him up, but Zakyura attacks a nearby bazaar. Despite lacking his powers, Ryo fights back, causing Gai to remember he became a hero to protect people before he gained his powers. Joined by the other Gokaigers, Gai and Ryo fend off Zakyura and force him to cough up everything he ate. Gai retrieves his equipment and joins the Gokaigers in using the Dairangers' Great Power, Qi-Power, to kill an enlarged Zakyura. Afterward, Ryo treats the Gokaigers to his gyōza and reminds Gai to never forget the most important part of being a hero.
34	"A Dream Come True"; Transliteration: "Yume o Kanaete" (Japanese: 夢を叶えて)	Naruhisa Arakawa	October 16, 2011
While out shopping, Luka loses a special coin during a Zangyack attack. She starts to counterattack, but a stranger arrives and bribes the Zangyack forces into leaving. She soon recognizes him as Cain, an old friend who claims to have accumulated a large fortune and has come to help make her dream come true. However, she realizes too late that Action Commander Vannine captured the real Cain, used his shapeshifting powers to assume his form, and lured her into a trap. Capturing her and assuming her form, Vannine infiltrates the Gokai Galleon, sets explosive charges, and detonates them while they are sleeping. Meanwhile, Luka and Cain reminisce about how she vowed to raise enough money to buy a planet for them and orphans displaced by the Zangyack Empire to live in peace. She reveals further that she joined the Gokaigers because the Greatest Treasure in the Universe could help her achieve her dream. As Vannine returns, intending to kill his captives, the Gokaigers arrive, having realized Vannine's deception and used their own to trick him into believing they died. Incensed, Vannine gets enlarged, but is ultimately killed by the Gokaigers. Afterward, Cain bids farewell to Luka.
35	"The Other Dimension"; Transliteration: "Jigen no Mukō" (Japanese: 次元ノムコウ)	Junko Kōmura	October 23, 2011
The Gokaigers discover a dimensional rift in the sky, from which a small robot named Bomper emerges. After Gai recognizes him as an ally of the Go-ongers, the pirates take him to the Go-ongers' leader, Sōsuke Esumi, so Bomper can ask for his help in stopping Gaiark Clan remnants who conquered the alternate world of Gunman World and defeated the Go-ongers' Engine partners. Sōsuke asks the Gokaigers to assist him, but Marvelous refuses since he and his crew already acquired the Go-ongers' Great Power. Upon witnessing Sōsuke's failed attempts at reaching the rift however, Marvelous ultimately agrees. Upon reaching Gunman World, the Gokaigers reunite Sōsuke with Engines Speedor, Bus-on, and BearRV, during which Speedor and BearRV reveal they now have a son named Machalcon, who has become a troublemaker and spends his time racing in their native Machine World. Suddenly, the group is attacked by Gaiark member Chirakashizky. After defeating him, he enlarges himself. The Gokaigers try to summon the Go-ongers' Great Power, but nothing happens. Nonetheless, they eventually destroy Chirakashizky before Gaiark's Pollution President Babatcheed places a barrier around Human World.
36	"Partner Pirate"; Transliteration: "Aibō Kaizoku" (Japanese: 相棒カイゾク)	Junko Kōmura	October 30, 2011
While Babatcheed battles the Zangyack Empire for the right to conquer Earth, the Gokaigers, Sōsuke, Bomper, and the Engines travel to Machine World in the hopes of convincing Machalcon to use his ability to travel between dimensions to help them. Despite his parents' pleas, he refuses and claims he will help if the pirates can beat him in a race. Accepting the challenge and while pursuing Machalcon, Marvelous realizes he races to run away from his problems before forcibly combining GokaiOh with the Engine to slow him down. Eventually, Machalcon admits his rebelliousness stems from not having anything to fight for, jealousy towards his parents' heroism, and anger over their fight with the Gaiark Clan keeping them away from home. After the Gokaigers accept him into their crew, Machalcon uses his powers to shatter Babatcheed's barrier. Upon returning to the Human World, the Gokaigers eliminate the Gaiark and Zangyack forces, causing the latter's leaders to retreat while Babatcheed enlarges himself. With Sōsuke confirming that the Go-ongers' Great Power is their bond with Machalcon, the Gokaigers summon and combine him with GokaiOh to destroy Babatcheed. Afterward, Machalcon returns to Machine World, promising to come back when the pirates need him.
37	"The Strongest Machine"; Transliteration: "Saikyō no Kessenki" (Japanese: 最強の決戦機)	Kento Shimoyama	November 6, 2011
Warz is visited by two of Akudos' Dogomin bodyguards, who have brought the Great Warz mecha with them. Warz insists on piloting it himself, but Damaras protests until Warz reveals he knows Akudos sent Damaras to watch over him because Akudos lacks confidence in his son. Seeking to prove that he can conquer Earth himself, Warz sends Barizorg to find the Gokaigers. Meanwhile, after defeating Zangyack forces, Machalcon accidentally catches the pirates off-guard when he asks what their Great Power is and they are unable to answer him. They later grow concerned that continuing to fight the Zangyack Empire is a fruitless endeavor. Gai assures them that they are fighting to protect Earth, but Marvelous shrugs him off. Upon learning of Barizorg and the Dogomin, Joe faces the former while the others narrowly drive off the latter. Before Barizorg and Joe can finish their fight, Warz arrives in the Great Warz to challenge the Gokaigers. They reconvene to fight back with their mecha and Machalcon, but Warz knocks him back to Machine World before overpowering the pirates. Recalling Aka Red's sacrifice, Marvelous forcibly ejects his crew to safety while he is seemingly killed amidst their mecha's destruction.
38	"The Power to Seize Dreams"; Transliteration: "Yume o Tsukamu Chikara" (Japanese: 夢を掴む力)	Kento Shimoyama	November 13, 2011
With the Gokaigers defeated, a triumphant Warz returns to the Gigant Horse and tasks Barizorg with ensuring the pirates' demises. While Gai, Don, Luka, and Ahim regroup, intending to tell Marvelous that they disagree with what he did, Joe encounters Barizorg and engages him in a final duel, eventually destroying him. Soon after, Sid's spirit appears before him, telling him to reunite with his comrades and continue reaching for their dreams. Upon learning of Barizorg's death, an infuriated Warz redeploys the Great Warz to avenge him over Damaras' objections. After having a dream about Aka Red and what it means to be a pirate, Marvelous awakens, reunites with his crewmates, and apologizes for what he did. After defeating the Dogomin, they reassemble their mecha and Machalcon to fight Warz, refusing to give up on their dreams. Unlocking their own Great Power, the Kanzen Soul, they use it to combine GokaiOh, GouZyuZin, and Machalcon to form Kanzen GokaiOh and destroy the Great Warz, killing Warz in the process. As the Gokaigers accept their role as the 35th Super Sentai, a mournful Damaras recovers Warz's body and swears vengeance.
39	"Why? We're High School Students"; Transliteration: "Dōshite? Oretachi Kōkōsei" (Japanese: どうして？俺たち高校生)	Junko Kōmura	November 20, 2011
Navi reveals the Gokaigers' latest clue to the Greatest Treasure involves Moroboshi High School, which Gai identifies as the Megarangers' alma mater. Though he explains the team has long since graduated, the Gokaigers head to Moroboshi anyway, where they encounter the Megarangers' leader turned teacher, Kenta Date. Overhearing them talking about how schools work, Kenta offers to give the Gokaigers his team's Great Power if they become students for the day. Ahim and Gai enjoy the prospect, though the others initially do not. As they gradually begin to enjoy high school life and form connections with its students, Kenta is ambushed by Basco and Sally. Gai intervenes, but Basco reveals he has placed multiple bombs around Moroboshi and intends to detontate them unless he gets the Megarangers' Great Power. Gai secretly relays the information to his crewmates, who join forces with the students to locate the bombs before using the Timerangers' powers to safely remove them. Reuniting with Gai and rescuing Kenta, the Gokaigers use the Megarangers' powers to drive off Basco, who orders Sally to release two giants, Soilroid Dororin and Woodroid Moririn. After destroying the monsters, the Gokaigers receive the Megarangers' Great Power as their diploma.
40	"The Future Is In the Past"; Transliteration: "Mirai wa Kako ni" (Japanese: 未来は過去に)	Junko Kōmura	November 27, 2011
Seeing GouZyu Drill being summoned on its own, the Gokaigers investigate its cockpit, where Gai finds a message from the Timerangers' Domon. He tasks them with traveling back in time to 2010 to avert the Negakure Temple's destruction as it will lead them to a Great Power and warns them not to interfere with the past. Accepting the mission, the Gokaigers use GouZyu Drill to reach the coordinates. Upon arrival, they encounter a boy named Mirai Moriyama, who Gai protects while the others leave to secretly save the Goseigers and Shinkengers from the Geshoushu. (Note: As depicted in the film Tensou Sentai Goseiger vs. Shinkenger: Epic on Ginmaku.) Learning that Mirai ran away from home because his mother Honami's job causes them to move constantly, Gai reveals he underwent similar circumstances, but stayed positive throughout and encourages Mirai to do the same. When Metal Alice sends Zan-KT0 to investigate a power source inside the Negakure Temple, Gai fights and destroys him. As Metal Alice leaves to update Zan-KT's specifications and focus on the Goseigers, (Note: As depicted in the Tensou Sentai Goseiger episode "The Dreadful Matrintis Empire".) the Gokaigers reunite the Moriyamas, take a picture together, and return to the present. Domon later discovers the picture and is brought to tears upon learning he and Honami had a son he never knew of.
41	"Something I Don't Want to Lose"; Transliteration: "Nakushitakunai Mono" (Japanese: なくしたくないもの)	Naruhisa Arakawa	December 4, 2011
In flashbacks, Zangyack Imperial Guardsman Zatsurig killed Ahim's family and destroyed her planet for defying the Zangyack Empire. After being forced to flee, she eventually encountered and asked to join the Gokaigers to inspire hope in other survivors from her planet. Despite initially lacking the proper skill to be a pirate, she gradually improved. In the present, Damaras and Insarn are suddenly visited by Akudos, who orders Imperial Guardsmen Dairando and Zatsurig to send Damaras to the brig for failing to protect Warz. As an ashamed Damaras willingly allows this, Akudos sends Zatsurig to avenge Warz. He locates Ahim, Joe, and Gai, during which she uncharacteristically attacks Zatsurig on sight. Her shocked crewmates join the fray, but all three are defeated before Zatsurig leaves to replenish his energy. Upon learning what happened, Don suggests the pirates go into hiding, but Ahim intends to face Zatsurig alone to avenge her family and planet. After the others stop her, she breaks down and reveals her history to them before Marvelous reminds her why she joined them. The next day, Ahim leads the Gokaigers in killing Zatsurig. Meanwhile, Damaras ponders his next move.
42	"The Strongest Man in the Universe"; Transliteration: "Uchū Saikyō no Otoko" (Japanese: 宇宙最強の男)	Naruhisa Arakawa	December 11, 2011
In flashbacks, Luka approached Don to help repair the Gokai Galleon. He agreed, but realized she is a pirate and ran off. In the present, due to the Gokaigers defeating his forces and Insarn's pleas, Akudos agrees to release Damaras. Revealing he always could have escaped if he wanted to, Damaras sets off to kill the pirates, forcing Basco to help him along the way. Meanwhile, the other Gokaigers are shocked to find Don on an alien magazine cover, which says he was a hero rumored to have died fighting a space dragon instead of a refugee from a Zangyack-controlled planet like he told them when he joined. Don apologizes for not revealing this, claiming he has no memory of his life before becoming a pirate. While attending a fancy dinner with his friends, claiming further it will jog his memories, they are attacked by Damaras. The Gokaigers are overwhelmed and attempt to retreat, but are cut off by Basco and Sally, who seemingly kill Joe, Luka, Ahim, and Gai while Damaras captures Marvelous. Alone, a horrified Don struggles to figure a way out of this situation.
43	"The Legendary Hero"; Transliteration: "Densetsu no Yūsha ni" (Japanese: 伝説の勇者に)	Naruhisa Arakawa	December 18, 2011
In flashbacks, Don found the Gokaigers, intending to keep his promise to help repair the Gokai Galleon. After cleaning the ship and cooking for them as well, he was shanghaied into their crew. In the present, Akudos tasks Damaras with publicly executing Marvelous to demoralize Earth's inhabitants. As the Zangyack forces prepare him, Basco taunts Marvelous by revealing he has recently stolen the Sun Vulcan team and Fivemen's Great Powers. Meanwhile, a distraught Don confesses to Navi that he fabricated the magazine cover as a prank. Upon learning of the execution, Don's feelings worsen until Navi reminds him why he joined the Gokaigers and how teams cover for each other. Inspired, Don crashes the execution, distracting Damaras while Navi frees Marvelous. Soon after, the other Gokaigers arrive, having been secretly saved by Basco, who betrays Damaras and tells the pirates he only helped them so they can secure the last two Great Powers for him before leaving. After being enlarged by Insarn, Damaras overpowers the Gokaigers until they summon five of their Great Powers to kill him. Afterward, Don reveals and apologizes for his prank, though the others assure him he is a hero regardless.
44	"A Lovely Christmas Eve"; Transliteration: "Suteki na Seiya" (Japanese: 素敵な聖夜)	Junko Kōmura	December 25, 2011
Following Damaras' death, Akudos puts the invasion on hold to focus on killing the Gokaigers. Meanwhile, the pirates question why Basco helped them until Gai tells them that Christmas is coming and has them celebrate with him. While making preparations, Gai and Luka encounter a man dressed as Santa Claus accompanied by a panda and siblings Saya and Seiji Kinoshita. While helping them, the pirates are attacked by Dairando and Action Commander Bibabu, with the latter turning several people, including Gai and Seiji, into dolls. The Gokaigers attempt to steal Bibabu's wand, but Dairando thwarts them and forces them to flee. After consoling Saya, promising she will help save Seiji, Luka distracts Bibabu while Saya borrows her Gokaiger powers to retrieve the wand and restore his victims. After getting her powers back, Luka joins her crewmates in fighting the Zangyack forces before eventually killing Bibabu and forcing Dairando to retreat. Afterward, as the Gokaigers celebrate Christmas with the Kinoshitas and their friends, the Battle Fever team's Shiro Akebono secretly gives them his team's Great Power, having disguised himself as Santa to watch over them and test their worthiness.
45	"Confused Ninja"; Transliteration: "Awatenbō Ninja" (Japanese: 慌てん坊忍者)	Junko Kōmura	January 8, 2012
As the Gokaigers review the 28 Great Powers they have and the five that Basco stole, they soon learn only the Kakurangers are left. Navi confirms this with her last clue, "a ninja is playing hide and seek". When Ahim suggests praying at a shrine to improve their chances at finding the Great Power, they recall Domon's mission and realize they forgot to investigate the Negakure Shrine. Upon returning to it, they find a strange pot and free Ninjaman from it. Identifying himself as an ally of the Kakurangers, he reveals he was sealed in the pot by the Three God Generals years prior. After the Gokaigers reveal what happened to the Kakurangers, he becomes crestfallen until the pirates show him how their powers work and tell him of their quest to collect the Sentai teams' Great Powers to find the Greatest Treasure in the Universe. Due to his history with humans, Ninjaman agrees to stay with them to test their trustworthiness before he considers giving them the Kakurangers' Great Power. Meanwhile, the Kakurangers' leader Tsuruhime watches from afar, impressed that the pirates found Ninjaman, and allows him to guide them for her before disappearing.
46	"Hero Eligibility"; Transliteration: "Hīrō Gōkaku" (Japanese: ヒーロー合格)	Junko Kōmura	January 15, 2012
After a week of watching and training the Gokaigers, Ninjaman deems Don, Ahim, and Gai worthy of the Kakurangers' Great Power before the group discover and fight Action Commander Juju, who shoots darts at Don and Gai before Marvelous repels him. When the affected Gokaigers start acting crazy, Ninjaman is upset to find Marvelous seemingly does not care. Ninjaman and Ahim later find several civilians behaving in a similar fashion before she eventually brings Don and Gai back to their senses. Meanwhile, Marvelous leads the other Gokaigers in locating Juju's base. They attempt to destroy the crystal ball he is using to control his victims, but Juju swallows it. After Navi alerts them to what is happening, Don, Ahim, Gai, and Ninjaman reconvene with the others. Apologizing for underestimating them, Ninjaman joins the Gokaigers in defeating Juju and freeing his victims. After Insarn enlarges Juju, Ninjaman tells the Gokaigers to use the Kakurangers' Great Power, which he soon discovers is himself before helping the pirates kill Juju. Afterward, Ninjaman leaves to find the Three God Generals, promising to come back if the Gokaigers need him. With five Great Powers left, the pirates prepare to face Basco.
47	"The Results of Treason"; Transliteration: "Uragiri no Hate" (Japanese: 裏切りの果て)	Naruhisa Arakawa	January 22, 2012
Intending to claim the five Great Powers he stole, Marvelous contacts Basco to arrange a meeting. However, the latter ambushes the Gokaigers with Sally's last two giants, Goldroid Geronpa and Sunroid Solar. After the pirates destroy them, Basco gives Sally a necklace, shoots her, and leaves her for dead. Marvelous allows his crewmates to take her back to the Gokai Galleon to treat her injuries despite Joe warning against it. That night, Sally seemingly steals the Gokaigers' Ranger Keys per Basco's plot to have her infiltrate their ranks. The next morning however, Basco discovers he has been tricked. The Gokaigers subsequently reveal themselves and how they convinced Sally to defect to them because of his cruelty towards her. Anticipating this, Basco detonates a bomb hidden in the necklace in an attempt to kill Marvelous. At the last minute, Sally sacrifices herself to absorb the brunt of the blast, leaving Marvelous grievously injured. Incensed by Basco's callousness, the remaining Gokaigers fight him, but he defeats them before hijacking the Gokai Galleon.
48	"The Fated Showdown"; Transliteration: "Shukumei no Taiketsu" (Japanese: 宿命の対決)	Naruhisa Arakawa	January 29, 2012
With the Gokaigers' Ranger Keys in his possession, Basco imbues the Sun Vulcan, Changemen, Flashmen, Maskmen, and Fivemen Keys with their respective Great Powers before bringing the Gokaiger Keys to life to find Navi. Meanwhile, the Gokaigers take the injured Marvelous to an abandoned warehouse, where Navi secretly contacts them to give them the Gokai Galleon's current coordinates before she is captured by Basco's simulacra. Once they break in, the pirates split up to find Navi, defeat the simulacra, and take their place to reach Basco. An impressed Basco reveals Navi is the door to the Greatest Treasure in the Universe before sending the Gokaigers outside to fight them. He overpowers them once more, but a still injured Marvelous arrives to settle his differences with Basco, who reveals Aka Red is from Earth and that he gathered the Ranger Keys to restore the Sentai teams' powers instead of finding the Greatest Treasure in the Universe. Refusing to yield, Marvelous engages Basco in a final duel that ends with the latter realizing the former used a piece of Sally's necklace to protect himself. Basco dies of his injuries while Marvelous collapses from exhaustion.
49	"The Greatest Treasure in the Universe"; Transliteration: "Uchū Saidai no Takara" (Japanese: 宇宙最大の宝)	Naruhisa Arakawa	February 5, 2012
As the Zangyack Empire prepare to conquer Earth, Dairando tells Insarn that she will be punished for failing to protect Warz afterward, though Akudos offers her one more chance to redeem herself. Meanwhile, Marvelous intends to lead the Gokaigers in claiming the Greatest Treasure. However, Gai is concerned that they cannot use the Great Powers that Basco stole without the corresponding teams' blessings. Suddenly, they are met by representatives of the Sun Vulcan team, Changemen, Flashmen, Maskmen, and Fivemen, who reveal that they have watched over the Gokaigers and consider them worthy of their teams' Great Powers. Following this, Navi transforms into a door, which the pirates unlock using the Sentai teams' red warriors' Ranger Keys. They soon find themselves in the center of the Earth and find the treasure. Upon touching it, the "Will of the Planet" reveals that they can use it to reshape the universe however they wish, at the cost of their Sentai predecessors' existences. While pondering whether to use the treasure, the Gokaigers are suddenly attacked by Insarn. The pirates eventually succeed in killing her, only to learn too late that the Zangyack Empire used her to buy time to launch their invasion.
50	"Day of the Deciding Battle"; Transliteration: "Kessen no Hi" (Japanese: 決戦の日)	Naruhisa Arakawa	February 12, 2012
The Gokaigers use their mecha and several Great Powers to face the Zangyack armada, but are ultimately defeated. With his victory seemingly assured, Akudos announces that by sunrise the next day, Earth's population will be annihilated by his forces. Injured and scattered, the Gokaigers wander through the city, helping victims of the invasion and encountering past allies as well as the Zyurangers' Goushi, who urges Gai to use the Greatest Treasure in the Universe to defeat the Zangyack Empire despite its cost. Upon reuniting with his crewmates, Gai tries to convince them of Goushi's pleas. To his surprise, they disagree, feeling that using the Greatest Treasure will rob Earth's people of the hope and courage that the Sentai teams have given them. Leaving the decision to him, Gai destroys the Greatest Treasure. The next day, they confront a Zangyack extermination group led by Dairando, proclaiming they will fight back as pirates and protect the Earth as the 35th Super Sentai.
51	"Farewell Space Pirates"; Transliteration: "Sayonara Uchū Kaizoku" (Japanese: さよなら宇宙海賊)	Naruhisa Arakawa	February 19, 2012
As the Gokaigers fight Dairando and his forces, the Zangyack Empire attempts to destroy the city. However, Navi arrives in the Free Joker to hold them off and help Marvelous and Gai reach the Gigant Horse. Once inside, the pair battle their way to the bridge to fight Akudos, with Gai distracting him so Marvelous can hijack the Gigant Horse and use its armaments to destroy the armada. While the other Gokaigers kill Dairando, an enraged Akudos destroys the Gigant Horse's controls and crashes it, though Marvelous and Gai escape safely to reunite with their crewmates. Having also survived, Akudos confronts the pirates, who overwhelm him with all of their Sentai predecessors' powers and their personal arsenal, eventually killing him. Months later, as the city is rebuilt and the Zangyack Empire dissolves, the Gokaigers return their predecessors' powers and leave Earth to find the Second Greatest Treasure in the Universe. Upon regaining his powers, the Gorengers' leader Tsuyoshi Kaijo thanks the pirates for their work and wishes them luck on their journey.
