= Satria Garuda BIMA-X =

Indonesian television series

- Logo
- Created by: Reino Barack; Ishimori Productions
- Developed by: MNC Media; Ishimori Productions
- Starring: Christian Loho; Rayhan Febrian; Stella Cornelia; Adhitya Alkatiri; Thalia
- Opening theme: "Kembali Bertahan" by Ungu
- Ending theme: "Let Tomorrow Be" by Flumpool
- Composer: Sajuli Gambara
- Country of origin: Indonesia
- Original language: Indonesian
- No. of episodes: 50

Production
- Executive producer: Reino Barack

Original release
- Network: RCTI
- Release: 14 September 2014 – 23 August 2015

Related
- BIMA Satria Garuda; Satria Heroes: Revenge of Darkness (film 2017); Bima-S (animation series)

Satria Garuda BIMA-X ('Garuda Knight BIMA-X') is an Indonesian tokusatsu series formed from the cooperation between MNC Media initiated by Reino Barack with Ishimori Productions, maker of the Kamen Rider series. This series marks the second season of the titular hero that started as BIMA Satria Garuda in 2013, while also becoming the second part of the Satria Series that was created by Reino Barack and Ishimori Pro. Following its success, in addition to the toys merchandise line, Satria Garuda BIMA-X has also been adapted into a video game developed by Namco Bandai Games, announced through the official Instagram account Reino Barack.

== Production ==
Reino Barack, executive producer and creator of the series, in a press conference on 25 June 2014, in MNC Tower Central Jakarta, announced that due to the success of the first series, Satria Garuda Bima-X will debut on September 7, 2014, with a total of 50 episodes, two times the number of episodes of its First Season. The early stages of the making of this series began in January 2014, with a budget larger than the first series, and filming for seven months. The story in this series is a direct continuation of the first season, bringing new characters into the world of the Satria Series.

According to Reino, MNC will be back in collaboration with two Japanese companies, Ishimori Productions, creators of tokusatsu content, and Itochu, a business license company with a global scope. With a slight change in the title from the First Season, Satria Garuda BIMA-X series will start in a special premiere on RCTI on Sunday, September 7, 2014, at 08.30 am, with the title of Satria Garuda Bima-X: New Beginning. The premiere episode will air with a duration of 90 minutes and will be re-aired again on September 13, 2014, at 3.30 pm, then continued a weekly 30-minute show from September 14, 2014.

== Story ==
The story of Satria Garuda BIMA-X starts after the First Season, which tells the story of Dunia Paralel ("Parallel World") ruled by the Kingdom of VUDO, and the failed effort of its evil ruler, Rasputin, to take over the Earth's resources to feed his power ambitions and to prevent further planetary destruction of Parallel World. Rasputin was defeated by the combined power of two Satria Garuda ("Garuda Knight") brothers, BIMA and Azazel. After Rasputin's defeat, enter a mysterious godly figure as the new ruler of VUDO who holds the title of Black Lord. Ray Bramasakti must use all his strength as Satria Garuda BIMA with his brother, Reza, the Satria Garuda "Azazel" to protect Earth and mankind from the evil forces of the new VUDO.

=== The seven Powerstones saga ===
"Powerstones" are the source of the power of the VUDO Empire. With unknown origins, Powerstones possess a latent force that can interact with their owners through a "Changer", giving their owner the power of a "Satria", the legendary hero who protects the Earth from time to time. The seven Powerstones have been contested by the rulers VUDO, either by Rasputin or the Black Lord in VUDO's invasion mission to Earth.

- Powerstone Merah ("Red"), owned by Ray Bramasakti, possesses the power of fire that transforms its owner into Satria "BIMA", the Satria Garuda armed with "Helios" sword. Powerstone Merah was destroyed during the battle with VUDO's new forces, but Ray's determination has awakened the hidden power of Powerstone Merah, giving the Powerstone a new power that can transform Ray into Satria Garuda "BIMA-X Flame".
- Powerstone Hitam ("Black"), formerly owned by Rasputin, the supreme commander of VUDO's forces. Possessing the power of darkness, it was embedded by Rasputin into Reza Bramasakti's body, giving him the power of Azazel, the Dark Knight armed with the dark Garuda sabre "Taranis".
- Powerstone Biru ("Blue"), formerly owned by Topeng Besi, VUDO's warlord and the right-hand man of Rasputin, VUDO's supreme commander. Powerstone Biru possesses the power of the wind.
- Powerstone Hijau ("Green"), possesses the power of Earth. Obtained from Rina's best friend, this power stone gains Bima X an overwhelming power, able to strike a weak opponent only with one punch. His weight will make him shake the earth while walking. With this form, Helios becomes a heavy weapon, which even powerful Draconer unable to lift it. This form will cost Bima its speed. Its finisher is Garuda Ground Breaker. This form debuted on BIMA-X episode 14.
- Powerstone Oranye ("Orange", formerly known as "Kuning"), possesses the power of thunder that transforms its owner into Satria "Torga", the Harimau ("Tiger") Satria accompanied by the golden tiger "Atlas".
- Powerstone Ungu ("Purple"), possesses the power of Magnetic wave.
- Powerstone Putih ("White"), possesses the power of Ice. Dimas use transforms into White tiger-themed Ice Mode Attribute is ice. The image color is white. It has also devised fighting methods such as making large claws called Ice Claw appear on both hands.

==== Synthetic Powerstone ====
In addition to the seven Powerstone, enters the Synthetic Powerstone, a product of a duplication machine created by Rexor, VUDO's leading scientist and leader of the Death Phantoms trio. Synthetic Powerstones are implanted into Black Lord's monster subordinates, and though not as strong as the true Powerstones, have given Black Lord's monsters powerful strength which exceeds Rasputin's.

== Characters ==
=== Main characters ===
- Ray Bramasakti / "BIMA-X" the red Satria Garuda, superhero and the main protagonist in this series. Kind, quiet, humble, and noble, young Ray was chosen to possess the mysterious power stone Merah ("Red") from Parallel World. After driving away the forces from Rasputin helped by his younger brother Reza, Ray returns to defend Earth once more now transforming into the more powerful "BIMA X". Ray is portrayed by Christian Loho.
- Reza Bramasakti / "Azazel", Ray's younger brother had been kidnapped as a child by VUDO and separated away for 21 years from his brother. Reza grew up in the Parallel World by the name Mikhail, but his strong identity as a human pushed him to steal the Power Stone Merah and escape to Earth to find a person who can save the Earth from VUDO's ambitions. Reza was transformed into "Azazel", VUDO's champion Ksatria Kegelapan ("Dark Knight"), after being brainwashed and given the strength of the Power Stone Hitam by Rasputin, VUDO's evil ruler. After the defeat of Rasputin, Reza has reunited with Ray and his adoptive family, joining forces with Ray as the Satria Garuda duo, ready to protect Earth and mankind. Reza is portrayed by Adhitya Alkatiri.
- Randy Iskandar, Rena's brother, Ray's adoptive family, is the breadwinner of the Iskandar and Bramasakti family who runs "Satria Motors" auto shop. Randy's temperament makes him a fatherly figure and protective older brother for Rena and Ray. He is also a childhood friend of Ray and knows about Ray's struggle as "BIMA". Randy also inherited considerable wealth from his missing parents. Randy is portrayed by Rayhan Febrian.
- Rena Iskandar, younger sister of Randy, Ray's foster sister, and a resourceful student who likes to cook. Rena has great respect for Ray and Randy, but has feelings for Ray. Rena had found out about Ray's secret alter-ego as BIMA after being rescued several times by BIMA from VUDO's attack. Although not proficient at martial arts, Rena is a brave girl who joins in fights against VUDO's evil missions with his beloved family. Rena is portrayed by Stella Cornelia, a former member of JKT48 idol group.
- Dimas Akhsara / "Master" / Satria Harimau Torga, the figure behind Aksara Corporation, the largest and most technologically advanced company in Indonesia. Dimas has been chosen by Orange Powerstone after VUDO's offensive. Dimas emerges from training under Glitter Torga and transformed into Satria Harimau Torga to fight alongside BIMA-X and Azazel against VUDO's forces. Dimas fights with an agile and powerful fighting style of Tiger Silat. Although born into a rich family and became the only heir and leader of the Akhsara dynasty, Dimas believes that his destiny is to use his wealth and power for the happiness of others. Dimas is portrayed by Fernando Surya.
- Ricca, Ricca, a mysterious girl who works as an assistant for the Akhsaras, a conglomerate family and owner of Aksara Corporation. Ricca is a girl with very broad knowledge and insight. Ricca is portrayed by Thalia of JKT48.

=== VUDO ===
Black Lord, a mysterious powerful figure who wants to rule the Earth. Previously holds the title of Black Priest, he is the new ruler of Parallel World who became the Black Lord of VUDO. After the fall of Rasputin who betrayed him by stealing the seven true Powerstones in an internal power struggle, he now holds a stronger grip of power upon VUDO's forces.
Neo Topeng Besi ("Neo Iron Mask"), former Commander of the kingdom of VUDO, and a steel armor magically animated by Rasputin, VUDO's fallen ruler. Topeng Besi had served Rasputin as the Supreme Commander of VUDO's troops, and was destroyed after a decisive battle with BIMA, but was later given a new life by the mysterious Black Priest. Topeng Besi ended the life of the injured Rasputin and declared the Black Priest as the new ruler of VUDO. Topeng Besi died again after being betrayed by Draconer in another internal power intrigue, only to be mysteriously resurrected again in a new form, now possessing an ever-growing dark power. he can transform into a Black tiger-themed Evil Torga, the evil Satria Harimau with the power of the Evil Torga Changer and Synthetic Power Stone. Debut in Episode 34. His combat power is extremely high, and he overwhelms Bima-X and Torga not only in a two-on-one match but also in the first meeting. Later in Episode 38, he revenges the Bima Legend who came to subdue him and also slaughters Bima-X and Torga who came to rescue him. At that time, he snatches the Helios Ax, which should only be held in Earth Mode, and has the strength to hold it and slash it down without difficulty.

- Evil Torga Changer: An item used by Topeng Besi with Synthetic Power Stones to transform into Evil Torga. Originally the same as the Torga Changer, it was also altered by a Synthetic Power Stone whose nature changed in response to Topeng Besi's intense hatred and anger, changing from gold to silver.
- Synthetic Power Stone: A power stone used by Topeng Besi to transform. Originally, it was used to revive previously dead monsters, but it changed nature and became the source of Anti-Satria power.
- Titan: Evil Torga's weapon. Unlike Torga's Atlas, the color is black. It also transforms into Titan Cannon.

VUDO Soldiers / Kranion, combat troopers of VUDO, and soldiers of Black Lord armed with stun rods.

==== Death Phantoms ====
Death Phantoms trio are the true followers of the Black Lord and serves as his enforcers. They are sent to Earth disguised as humans to carry out missions on behalf of the Black Lord.

- Rexor / Reza Alamsyah, leader of the Death Phantoms. Donning the Tyrannosaurus mask, Rexor is a monster disguised as a minister of Research and Conservation of Natural Resources.
- Lady Mossa / Amestina Seraphine, donning the Mosasaurus mask and disguised as a gems entrepreneur woman. Amnestina accesses the information and discovery of new natural resources under the guise of her gems business.
- Draconer / Chris Ruslan, donning the Pteranodon mask, disguised as a young journalist to reach the Earth news network and the latest information on Earth.

==== Shadow Crisis ====
The proud officers of VUDO's former supreme leader Rasputin. Two elite officers of Shadow of Crisis have now been mysteriously revived and serves Topeng Besi who has come back to life.

- Zacros, the goat monster, skilled and crafty with his Zacros Lance horned spears and is a master of magic which can create teleportation doors and manipulate dreams. Voice: Maulana Dwi Laksono
- Karax, the arrogant crow monster armed with Crow Sword. Karax can shoot his enemies down with sharp explosive feathers, Crow Shoot. Voice: Eddie Setiawan

==== VUDO monsters ====
Black Lord's monsters are VUDO combat officers who are powered by Rexor's implanted Synthetic Powerstone.

- Proteus, the Komodo dragon monster, can fire energy blasts as well as deadly poison and uses his extendable left arm as a whip and spear.
- Bachyura, the crab monster, has a strange power that can create earthquakes and attacks with an electric pincer on his right arm.
- Azellot, the bee monster, master swordsman of VUDO armed with a fencing sword in his left arm, and the deadly bee stinger edge attack.
- Zoik, the isopod monster, always feels hungry and will eat anything visible, even assessing the delicacy of his eaten objects.
- Raflesian, the rafflesia monster, armed with a whip and can clone himself whenever he wanted, rendering him seem immortal.
- Guiro, the armadillo monster, always fought with hand-to-hand martial arts, he can furl his body into an iron ball to attack and has impenetrable armor skin.
- Magna, the rhinoceros monster, armed with the Magna Hammer and a powerful ram, the physically strongest monster with a super strong metal as its skin.
- Nermean, the lion monster, armed with a sword and a master of flame sorcery, king's roar, and blue poison flame, and the illusion spell mirrors crossing.
- Super Kranion, the kranion monster, a new breed of monster with a physical strength that exceeds other Kranion soldiers in general.

=== Supporting cast ===
- Glitter BIMA, the patron spirit of Satria Garuda, Glitter BIMA's spirit appeared to guide the Satria Garuda brothers. Voiced by Nanang Kuswanto.
- Glitter Torga, the patron spirit of Satria Harimau, the spirit that guides "Master" / Dimas Akhsara to practice and become a Satria. Voiced by Julian Widjaja.
- Ati Carlotta, Rena's old friend achieved her dream of becoming a famous television star with a mysterious power that permeates from her green bracelet. Fearing to lose her fame, Ati doesn't want to separate from the mysterious power. Ati Carlotta is portrayed by Abel Chantika.
- Bu Miranti ("Mrs. Miranti"), business owner of the most delicious dragon fruit orchard in Indonesia. Everything changed when monsters start attacking his plantation for an unknown reason. Mrs. Miranti is portrayed by Riana Puspasari.
- Tom Malkis, a reporter who fills the position of Chris Ruslan (Draconer) as a news anchor for TV news. To gain the recognition of his colleagues, Tom ignored the danger, pursuing news coverage of a fallen meteorite, which is the terrible "Phantom Weapon". Tom Malkis is portrayed by James Leoreen Purba.
- Tsugi, the loyal butler of Dimas Akhsara. Tsugi's life was saved by Dimas in the great chaos that ensued during the battle with Rasputin's Grand Gator machine in Jakarta. Tsugi is also a personal bodyguard of Dimas and a master of martial arts. Tsugi is portrayed by Sugishima who is also a suit actor in the series.
- Professor Rudi Bramasakti, father of Ray and Reza, a scientist who invented an inter-dimensional portal connecting Earth and the Parallel World, showing VUDO a new world to conquer. It is said that Rudi and his wife, Risha, who was originally believed to have died, actually fled to the Parallel World to escape from VUDO's forces. Rudi and his wife communicate with Ray and Reza only through hologram messages they left in Parallel World machinery. Rudi is portrayed by Gito Nusantoro.
- Risha Bramasakti, wife of Professor Rudy Bramasakti and the mother of Ray and Reza. Risha who was originally believed to have died, actually fled with her husband to Parallel World to escape from VUDO's forces without ever returning to Earth. Risha is portrayed by Siti Dewi Rahmawati.
- Rasputin, former supreme commander of VUDO Empire forces defeated by BIMA and Azazel. Since his defeat, his spirit is now lost between Parallel World and the real world, still holding a grudge against his enemies. Rasputin is portrayed by Sutan Simatupang.
- Kou / "Satria Naga" is a warrior from the Parallel World, He can transform into a dragon. He appears in episodes 40 and 41. portrayed by Tetsuo Kurata.

== Songs ==
Opening Theme

- "Kembali Bertahan" ("Return to Survive")
  - Composition and Arrangement: Arlonsy Miraldi "Oncy"
  - Artist: Ungu

Ending Theme

- "Let Tomorrow Be"
  - Composition and Arrangement: Flumpool
  - Artist: Flumpool

Other

- "Seperti Bintang" (lit. "Stellar")
  - Composition and Arrangement: Oncy
  - Artist: Ungu
  - In Special Episode and Episode 21, also the opening song for BIMA Satria Garuda series (First Season).
- "Pasti Bisa" ("You Can Do It")
  - Composition and arrangement: Agus Setiawan / Hits Records
  - Artist: Citra Scholastika
  - Episode: #13 - "Rahasia Bintang Televisi" (performed by Ati Carlotta / Abel Chantika)
  - Episode: #14 - "Bergemalah! Power Stone Bumi"

== Video game ==
On March 8, 2015, Reino Barack, executive producer and creator of the series announced via his Instagram account, that a video game featuring characters from Satria Garuda BIMA-X will be published in mid-2015. The game will be published as a handheld mobile game as a fighting game on iOS and Android operating systems. The game is developed and published for free by Japanese entertainment company Namco Bandai Games. The game is available in Google Playstore and Apple Store since July 1, 2015, with a total of 11 playable characters.

== Episodes ==
Premiere	Episode	Title	Enemy Monster	Writer	Director
7 September 2014	Special	"The Beginning"	Proteus (Komodo)	Junko Komura	Hideki Oka; Alam Putra K.W
14 September 2014	1	"Kembalinya Para Satria Garuda" ("Return of The Garuda Knights")	Bachyura (Crab)	Junko Komura	Teruyoshi Ishii; Arnandha Wyanto
21 September 2014	2	"Cepat! Selamatkan Bumi dari Bencana Letusan" ("Hurry! Save the Earth from the Eruption Disaster")	Bachyura (Crab)	Junko Komura	Teruyoshi Ishii; Arnandha Wyanto
28 September 2014	3	"Pencarian PowerStone Biru" ("The Quest for the Blue PowerStone")	Azelot (Bee)	Riku Sanjo	Hideki Oka; Alam Putra K.W
5 October 2014	4	"Kemunculan BIMA-X Angin" ("The Rise of Wind BIMA-X")	Azelot (Bee)	Riku Sanjo	Hideki Oka; Alam Putra K.W
12 October 2014	5	"Kemunculan Ghost Ship!" ("The Ghost Ship Appears!")	Shadow Crisis	Daisuke Kihara	Teruyoshi Ishii; Arnandha Wyanto
19 October 2014	6	"Dimulainya Rencana Shadow Crisis" ("The Start of Shadow Crisis' Plans")	Shadow Crisis	Daisuke Kihara	Teruyoshi Ishii; Arnandha Wyanto
26 October 2014	7	"Monster Kelaparan Mencari Mangsa" ("Starving Monster Searching for Prey")	Zoik (Isopod)	Daisuke Kihara	Hideki Oka
2 November 2014	8	"Pemasak Berkekuatan Api, Berjuanglah!" ("Flame Powered Chef, Keep on Fighting!")	Zoik (Isopod)	Daisuke Kihara	Hideki Oka
9 November 2014	9	"Pahlawan Kurang Tidur" ("A Sleep Deprived Hero")	Shadow Crisis	Junko Komura	Arnandha Wyanto; Teruyoshi Ishii
16 November 2014	10	"Mengungkap Misteri Ricca!" ("Revealing Ricca's Mystery!")	Shadow Crisis	Junko Komura	Arnandha Wyanto; Teruyoshi Ishii
23 November 2014	11	"Misi Scarlet Bintang" ("Scarlet Bintang Mission")	Raflesian (Rafflesia)	Riku Sanjo	Teruyoshi Ishii; Alam Putra K.W
30 November 2014	12	"Memangkas Bunga Pengganggu!" ("Trimming a Pesky Flower")	Raflesian (Rafflesia)	Riku Sanjo	Teruyoshi Ishii; Alam Putra K.W
7 December 2014	13	"Rahasia Bintang Televisi" ("A Television Star's Secret")	Guiro (Armadillo); Great Monster Draconer	Junko Komura	Hideki Oka; Ahmad Nurudin
14 December 2014	14	"Bergemalah! Power Stone Bumi" ("Reverberate! Earth Power Stone")	Guiro (Armadillo); Great Monster Draconer	Junko Komura	Hideki Oka; Ahmad Nurudin
21 December 2014	15	"Menyelamatkan Bumi yang Hijau" ("Saving The Green Earth")	Proteus (Komodo); Great Monster Rexor	Riku Sanjo	Teruyoshi Ishii; Alam Putra K.W
28 December 2014	16	"Serangan Balik Power Stones" ("Power Stones' Retaliation")	Proteus (Komodo); Great Monster Rexor	Riku Sanjo	Teruyoshi Ishii; Alam Putra K.W
4 January 2015	17	"Perintah Pembunuhan Ricca!" ("Ricca's Assassination Order!")	Great Monster Mossa	Daisuke Kihara	Arnandha Wyanto
11 January 2015	18	"Mencairkan Hati yang Dingin!" ("Thawing A Cold Heart!")	Great Monster Mossa	Daisuke Kihara	Arnandha Wyanto
18 January 2015	19	"Power Stone yang Diincar, Munculnya Pasukan Monster Hantu!!" ("The Searched Power Stone, The Ghost Monster Army Appears!!")	6 Ghost Monsters	Hideki Oka	Hideki Oka; Ahmad Nurudin
25 January 2015	20	"Phantom Weapon yang Mengerikan" ("The Horrifying Phantom Weapon")	Great Monster Draconer	Hideki Oka	Hideki Oka; Ahmad Nurudin
1 February 2015	21	"Satria Baru Bernama Torga!" ("The New Satria Called Torga!")	Great Monster Draconer	Riku Sanjo	Hideki Oka; Ahmad Nurudin
8 February 2015	22	"Identitas Torga!" ("Torga's Identity")	Bachyura (Crab)	Junko Komura	Arnandha Wyanto
15 February 2015	23	"Yang Melindungi dan Yang Dilindungi" ("Those Who Protect and Those Who Are Protected")	Azellot (Bee)	Junko Komura	Arnandha Wyanto
22 February 2015	24	"Mengejar Power Stone Terakhir" ("The Race for The Last Power Stone")	Magna (Rhinoceros)	Daisuke Kihara	Teruyoshi Ishii; Alam Putra K.W
1 March 2015	25	"Kekuatan yang Tak Terlihat... BIMA-X Ungu!" ("The Unseen Power... Purple BIMA-X!")	Magna (Rhinoceros)	Daisuke Kihara	Teruyoshi Ishii; Alam Putra K.W
8 March 2015	26	"Jebakan Bagi Torga!" ("A Distraction for Torga!")	Nermean (Lion)	Junko Komura	Hideki Oka; Ahmad Nurudin
15 March 2015	27	"Tekad Power Stone Putih" ("The White Power Stone's Determination")	Nermean (Lion)	Junko Komura	Hideki Oka; Ahmad Nurudin
22 March 2015	28	"Reza Dalam Bahaya Besar!! Pembalasan Rasputin" ("Reza In Grave Danger!! Rasputin's Revenge")	Roh Rasputin	Hideki Oka	Alam Putra K.W
29 March 2015	29	"Rahasia Dunia Satria" ("Satria Universe's Secret")	Zoik (Isopoda)	Riku Sanjo	Arnandha Wyanto
5 April 2015	30	"Menolong Torga Dari Dark Limbo" ("Rescuing Torga from the Dark Limbo")	Zoik (Isopoda)	Riku Sanjo	Arnandha Wyanto
12 April 2015	31	"Lahirnya Super Kranion!!" ("The Birth of Super Kranion!!")	Super Kranion	Daisuke Kihara	Hideki Oka; Ahmad Nurudin
19 April 2015	32	"Memegang Teguh Janji Kemenangan" ("Holding Firm the Promise of Victory")	Shadow Crisis	Daisuke Kihara	Hideki Oka; Ahmad Nurudin
26 April 2015	33	"Manuver Rahasia Rexor" ("Rexor's Secret Maneuver")	Topeng Besi (Evil Torga)	Junko Komura	Teruyoshi Ishii; Alam Putra K.W
3 May 2015	34	"Jati Diri Topeng Besi" "("The Iron Mask's Identity")	Topeng Besi (Evil Torga)	Junko Komura	Teruyoshi Ishii; Alam Putra K.W
10 May 2015	35	"Guru yang Aneh" ("Freaking Teacher")	Great Monster Mossa	Daisuke Kihara	Arnandha Wyanto
17 May 2015	36	"Kekuatan Sebenarnya Ajaran Guru" ("The True Power of Master's Teaching")	Shadow Crisis	Daisuke Kihara	Arnandha Wyanto
24 May 2015	37	"Strategi Baru Topeng Besi" ("New Strategy of Iron Mask")	Shadow Crisis	Ahmad Nurudin	Ahmad Nurudin
31 May 2015	38	"Pertarungan Penentuan di Dunia Satria"("The Decisive Fight at Satria World")	Evil Torga; Mega Titan	Junko Komura	Hiroki Asai; Ahmad Nurudin
7 June 2015	39	"Bumi yang Memiliki Dark Power" ("The Earth with a Dark Power")	Evil Torga; Mega Titan	Junko Komura	Hiroki Asai; Ahmad Nurudin
14 June 2015	40	"Pertemuan Kembali Keluarga yang Terpisah" ("The Reunion of a Separated Family")	Death Phantoms; Zombi Draconer	Daisuke Kihara	Hideki Oka; Alam Putra K.W
21 June 2015	41	"Pertempuran Reza di Dunia Paralel" ("Reza's Fight in Parallel World")	Karax; Ghost Ship	Daisuke Kihara	Hideki Oka; Ahmad Nurudin
28 June 2015	42	"Rena yang Mencurigakan" ("Suspicious Rena")	Lady Mossa; Zombi Draconer; Evil Rena; Zacros	Daisuke Ishibashi	Ahmad Nurudin
5 July 2015	43	"Mengembalikan Rena" ("Returning Rena")	Lady Mossa; Zombi Draconer; Evil Rena; Zacros	Daisuke Ishibashi	Hiroki Asai; Alam Putra K.W
12 July 2015	44	"Serangan VUDO yang Berbahaya" ("VUDO's Dangerous Attack")	Kapal Lady Mossa	Shinji Tomita	Shinji Tomita; Ahmad Nurudin
19 July 2015	45	"Harga Diri Lady Mossa" ("The Pride of Lady Mossa")	Great Monster Mossa	Junko Komura; Daisuke Ishibashi	Arnandha Wyanto
26 July 2015	46	"Kemunculan Dunia Baru" ("Emergence of a New World")	Zacros	Junko Komura; Daisuke Ishibashi	Arnandha Wyanto
2 Agustus 2015	47	"Penyerangan ke Istana Black Lord"	8 Castle Knights; Great Monster Rexor; Evil Torga	Riku Sanjo	
9 Agustus 2015	48	"Pertarungan Penentuan Dua Torga"	8 Castle Knights; Great Monster Rexor; Evil Torga	Riku Sanjo	Hideki Oka; Ahmad Nurudin
16 Agustus 2015	49	"Pertarungan Final Melawan Black Lord"	Black Lord	Junko Komura	Hideki Oka; Ahmad Nurudin
23 Agustus 2015	50	"Pertarungan Terakhir Menuju Kedamaian"	Black Lord	Junko Komura	Hideki Oka; Ahmad Nurudin

Preceded by BIMA Satria Garuda	Satria Garuda Series; 2014	Succeeded by TBA
