= Kaizoku Sentai Gokaiger =

Television series

- The opening title card for Kaizoku Sentai Gokaiger
- Genre: Tokusatsu; Superhero fiction Action; Adventure; Comedy; Crossover fiction
- Created by: Shotaro Ishinomori; Saburo Yatsude
- Written by: Naruhisa Arakawa; Junko Komura; Kento Shimoyama; Toshiki Inoue; Daisuke Ishibashi; Yoshio Urasawa
- Directed by: Shojiro Nakazawa; Noboru Takemoto; Koichi Sakamoto; Hiroyuki Kato; Katsuya Watanabe; Taro Sakamoto
- Starring: Ryota Ozawa; Yuki Yamada; Mao Ichimichi; Kazuki Shimizu; Yui Koike; Junya Ikeda; Gaku Shindo; Kei Hosogai
- Narrated by: Tomokazu Seki
- Opening theme: "Kaizoku Sentai Gokaiger" by Tsuyoshi Matsubara (Project.R) with Young Fresh (Project.R)
- Ending theme: "Super Sentai, Hero Getter" by Project.R
- Composer: Kousuke Yamashita
- Country of origin: Japan
- No. of episodes: 51 (list of episodes)

Production
- Producers: Motoi Sasaki (TV Asahi); Takaaki Utsunomiya; Takahito Ōmori (Toei); Kōichi Yada; Akihiro Fukada (Toei Advertising)
- Production location: Tokyo, Japan (Greater Tokyo Area)
- Running time: 24–25 minutes
- Production companies: Ishimori Productions; TV Asahi; Toei Company; Toei Advertising

Original release
- Network: ANN (TV Asahi)
- Release: February 13, 2011 – February 19, 2012

Related
- Tensou Sentai Goseiger; Tokumei Sentai Go-Busters

Kaizoku Sentai Gokaiger (海賊戦隊ゴーカイジャー, Kaizoku Sentai Gōkaijā; Pirate Squadron Gokaiger) (Note: In early promotional materials for the series, the Japanese word gōkai (豪快, exciting; heroic) is used as a meaning for the series' title.) is a Japanese Tokusatsu television series and the 35th entry in its long-running Super Sentai metaseries of Japanese tokusatsu and celebrated the franchise's 35th anniversary. television series following Tensou Sentai Goseiger. It follows a Pirate motif, joining Kamen Rider OOO and then Kamen Rider Fourze as a program featured in TV Asahi's Super Hero Time programming block. It aired from February 13, 2011 to February 19, 2012, replacing Tensou Sentai Goseiger and was replaced by Tokumei Sentai Go-Busters.

Gokaiger is a special anniversary series. Its protagonists are able to transform into not only their own unique, pirate-themed forms, but also all of the previous 34 Super Sentai teams, each of which have their own unique power that the Gokaigers can access. The series and related films also features reappearances of actors reprising their characters from each of the previous series.

Kaizoku Sentai Gokaiger began airing in South Korea in July 2012 as Power Rangers Captain Force (Hangul: 파워레인저 캡틴포스; RR: Paweoraeinjeo Kaebtinposeu). Its footage was used for the 2014 American Power Rangers season, Power Rangers Super Megaforce.

== Plot ==
In a world where the previous Super Sentai groups exist, a group of young pirates come from space to Earth to obtain the Greatest Treasure in the Universe, which can only be acquired after obtaining the Greater Powers of the past 34 Super Sentai Teams. However, they end up facing the Space Empire Zangyack, whose earlier invasion forces were wiped out by the 34 Sentai groups not long ago before a new invasion force is established under Commander Warz Gill, the emperor's son. As a result, due to their history with the empire, the space pirates use the powers of the older teams and attempt to master their powers to fight the Zangyack forces as the Gokaigers.

== Episodes ==
No.	Title	Written by	Original release date
1	"Space Pirates Appear"; Transliteration: "Uchū Kaizoku Arawaru" (Japanese: 宇宙海賊現る)	Naruhisa Arakawa	February 13, 2011
2	"The Worth of This Planet"; Transliteration: "Kono Hoshi no Kachi" (Japanese: この星の価値)	Naruhisa Arakawa	February 20, 2011
3	"Changing Courage into Magic ~Maagi Magi Go Gokai~"; Transliteration: "Yūki o Mahō ni Kaete ~Māji Maji Gō Gōkai~" (Japanese: 勇気を魔法に変えて～マージ・マジ・ゴー・ゴーカイ～)	Naruhisa Arakawa	February 27, 2011
4	"Blue Pirate Friend"; Transliteration: "Nani no Tame no Nakama" (Japanese: 何のための仲間)	Naruhisa Arakawa	March 6, 2011
5	"Judgment Pirates"; Transliteration: "Jajjimento Pairētsu" (Japanese: ジャッジメント･パイレーツ)	Naruhisa Arakawa	March 20, 2011 (Note: This episode was originally scheduled to air on March 13, 2011, but TV Asahi postponed the airing of this and several other television programs to air news coverage on the Tōhoku earthquake and tsunami.)
6	"The Most Important Thing"; Transliteration: "Ichiban Daiji na Mono" (Japanese: 一番大事なもの)	Naruhisa Arakawa	March 27, 2011
7	"Niki-Niki! Kenpō Lesson"; Transliteration: "Niki-Niki! Kenpō Shugyō" (Japanese: ニキニキ！拳法修行)	Junko Kōmura	April 3, 2011
8	"Little Spy Tactics"; Transliteration: "Supai Shōsakusen" (Japanese: スパイ小作戦)	Naruhisa Arakawa	April 10, 2011
9	"The Lion, Runs"; Transliteration: "Shishi, Kakeru" (Japanese: 獅子、走る)	Junko Kōmura	April 17, 2011
10	"Card Game"; Transliteration: "Toranpu Shōbu" (Japanese: トランプ勝負)	Kento Shimoyama	April 24, 2011
11	"The Serious Rebellion"; Transliteration: "Shinken Ōsōdō" (Japanese: 真剣大騒動)	Naruhisa Arakawa	May 1, 2011
12	"The Guaranteed Showy Samurai"; Transliteration: "Kiwametsuki Hade na Samurai" (Japanese: 極付派手侍)	Naruhisa Arakawa	May 8, 2011
13	"Tell Me the Way"; Transliteration: "Michi o Oshiete" (Japanese: 道を教えて)	Junko Kōmura	May 15, 2011
14	"Now More Traffic Safety"; Transliteration: "Ima mo Kōtsū Anzen" (Japanese: いまも交通安全)	Yoshio Urasawa	May 22, 2011
15	"A Privateer Appears"; Transliteration: "Shiryakusen Arawaru" (Japanese: 私掠船現る)	Junko Kōmura	May 29, 2011
16	"Clash! Sentai vs. Sentai"; Transliteration: "Gekitotsu! Sentai Bāsasu Sentai" (Japanese: 激突！戦隊VS戦隊)	Junko Kōmura	June 5, 2011
17	"The Awesome Silver Pirate"; Transliteration: "Sugoi Gin'iro no Otoko" (Japanese: 凄い銀色の男)	Naruhisa Arakawa	June 12, 2011
18	"The Big Abare With the Dinosaur Robot Drill"; Transliteration: "Kyōryū Robotto Doriru de Ō Abare" (Japanese: 恐竜ロボットドリルで大アバレ)	Naruhisa Arakawa	June 26, 2011
19	"Armor of the 15 Warriors"; Transliteration: "Jūgo Senshi no Yoroi" (Japanese: １５戦士の鎧)	Naruhisa Arakawa	July 3, 2011
20	"The Lost Forest"; Transliteration: "Mayoi no Mori" (Japanese: 迷いの森)	Junko Kōmura	July 10, 2011
21	"The Heart of an Adventure"; Transliteration: "Bōkensha no Kokoro" (Japanese: 冒険者の心)	Kento Shimoyama	July 17, 2011
22	"A Promise on a Shooting Star"; Transliteration: "Hoshi Furu Yakusoku" (Japanese: 星降る約束)	Naruhisa Arakawa	July 24, 2011 (Note: This episode was the final Super Sentai episode to air on analog television in most of Japan. Analog television broadcasts ceased at noon that day.)
23	"People's Lives Are the Future of the World"; Transliteration: "Hito no Inochi wa Chikyū no Mirai" (Japanese: 人の命は地球の未来)	Junko Kōmura	July 31, 2011
24	"Foolish Earthlings"; Transliteration: "Oroka na Chikyūjin" (Japanese: 愚かな地球人)	Yoshio Urasawa	August 7, 2011
25	"Pirates and Ninjas"; Transliteration: "Kaizoku to Ninja" (Japanese: 海賊とニンジャ)	Naruhisa Arakawa	August 14, 2011
26	"Shushutto The Special"; Transliteration: "Shushutto Za Supesharu" (Japanese: シュシュッとTHE SPECIAL)	Naruhisa Arakawa	August 21, 2011
27	"Switched Gokai Pirates"; Transliteration: "Itsumo yori Gōkai na Chenji" (Japanese: いつもより豪快なチェンジ)	Junko Kōmura	August 28, 2011
28	"Wings are Eternal"; Transliteration: "Tsubasa wa Eien ni" (Japanese: 翼は永遠に)	Toshiki Inoue	September 4, 2011
29	"The Abare Quick-Changing New Combination"; Transliteration: "Abare Shichihenge de Shin Gattai" (Japanese: アバレ七変化で新合体)	Naruhisa Arakawa	September 11, 2011
30	"My Friend's Soul"; Transliteration: "Tomo no Tamashii Dake Demo" (Japanese: 友の魂だけでも)	Junko Kōmura	September 18, 2011
31	"Crash!! The Secret Operators"; Transliteration: "Shōgeki!! Himitsu Sakusen" (Japanese: 衝撃!!秘密作戦)	Kento Shimoyama	September 25, 2011
32	"One Power"; Transliteration: "Chikara o Hitotsu ni" (Japanese: 力を一つに)	Kento Shimoyama	October 2, 2011
33	"It's a Hero!!!"; Transliteration: "Hīrō daaa!!" (Japanese: ヒーローだァァッ!!)	Daisuke Ishibashi	October 9, 2011
34	"A Dream Come True"; Transliteration: "Yume o Kanaete" (Japanese: 夢を叶えて)	Naruhisa Arakawa	October 16, 2011
35	"The Other Dimension"; Transliteration: "Jigen no Mukō" (Japanese: 次元ノムコウ)	Junko Kōmura	October 23, 2011
36	"Partner Pirate"; Transliteration: "Aibō Kaizoku" (Japanese: 相棒カイゾク)	Junko Kōmura	October 30, 2011
37	"The Strongest Machine"; Transliteration: "Saikyō no Kessenki" (Japanese: 最強の決戦機)	Kento Shimoyama	November 6, 2011
38	"The Power to Seize Dreams"; Transliteration: "Yume o Tsukamu Chikara" (Japanese: 夢を掴む力)	Kento Shimoyama	November 13, 2011
39	"Why? We're High School Students"; Transliteration: "Dōshite? Oretachi Kōkōsei" (Japanese: どうして？俺たち高校生)	Junko Kōmura	November 20, 2011
40	"The Future Is In the Past"; Transliteration: "Mirai wa Kako ni" (Japanese: 未来は過去に)	Junko Kōmura	November 27, 2011
41	"Something I Don't Want to Lose"; Transliteration: "Nakushitakunai Mono" (Japanese: なくしたくないもの)	Naruhisa Arakawa	December 4, 2011
42	"The Strongest Man in the Universe"; Transliteration: "Uchū Saikyō no Otoko" (Japanese: 宇宙最強の男)	Naruhisa Arakawa	December 11, 2011
43	"The Legendary Hero"; Transliteration: "Densetsu no Yūsha ni" (Japanese: 伝説の勇者に)	Naruhisa Arakawa	December 18, 2011
44	"A Lovely Christmas Eve"; Transliteration: "Suteki na Seiya" (Japanese: 素敵な聖夜)	Junko Kōmura	December 25, 2011
45	"Confused Ninja"; Transliteration: "Awatenbō Ninja" (Japanese: 慌てん坊忍者)	Junko Kōmura	January 8, 2012
46	"Hero Eligibility"; Transliteration: "Hīrō Gōkaku" (Japanese: ヒーロー合格)	Junko Kōmura	January 15, 2012
47	"The Results of Treason"; Transliteration: "Uragiri no Hate" (Japanese: 裏切りの果て)	Naruhisa Arakawa	January 22, 2012
48	"The Fated Showdown"; Transliteration: "Shukumei no Taiketsu" (Japanese: 宿命の対決)	Naruhisa Arakawa	January 29, 2012
49	"The Greatest Treasure in the Universe"; Transliteration: "Uchū Saidai no Takara" (Japanese: 宇宙最大の宝)	Naruhisa Arakawa	February 5, 2012
50	"Day of the Deciding Battle"; Transliteration: "Kessen no Hi" (Japanese: 決戦の日)	Naruhisa Arakawa	February 12, 2012
51	"Farewell Space Pirates"; Transliteration: "Sayonara Uchū Kaizoku" (Japanese: さよなら宇宙海賊)	Naruhisa Arakawa	February 19, 2012

== Production ==
On July 30, 2010, Toei applied for trademarks on the title Kaizoku Sentai Gōkaijā (海賊戦隊ゴーカイジャー) to be used on various products. The Japan Patent Office approved these trademarks on August 26, 2010. During the Super Sentai VS Theater programming on December 26, 2010, the series was officially announced in a commercial. A Tokyo Dome City event for the premiere, serving as the introduction of the cast and theme song singers to the public, held on January 29 and 30, 2011.

== Films and Specials ==
The Gokaigers made their first appearance as a cameo in the crossover film Tensou Sentai Goseiger vs. Shinkenger: Epic on Ginmaku.

=== Theatrical ===
==== Gokaiger Goseiger Super Sentai 199 Hero Great Battle ====
Gokaiger Goseiger Super Sentai 199 Hero Great Battle (ゴーカイジャー ゴセイジャー スーパー戦隊199ヒーロー 大決戦, Gōkaijā Goseijā Sūpā Sentai Hyakukyūjūkyū Hīrō Daikessen) is the film commemorating the 35th anniversary of the Super Sentai Series. The film primarily featured the casts of Gokaiger and Tensou Sentai Goseiger, among the 199 total heroes from the Super Sentai series to appear. The film was originally scheduled for release on May 21, 2011. However, due to the 2011 Tōhoku earthquake and tsunami, filming was affected and the film's release was postponed until June 11. The addition of Gokai Silver is revealed at the end of the movie and he goes on to appear in his TV debut in the episode "The Awesome Silver Man" released the following day. The event of the movie takes place between episode 16 and 17. This film is a tribute to Himitsu Sentai Gorenger.

==== The Flying Ghost Ship ====
Kaizoku Sentai Gokaiger the Movie: The Flying Ghost Ship (海賊戦隊ゴーカイジャーTHE MOVIE 空飛ぶ幽霊船, Kaizoku Sentai Gōkaijā Za Mūbī Sora Tobu Yūreisen) is the main theatrical release for Gokaiger where the Gokai Galleon crew deal with revived enemies under the captain of a ghost ship. It was released on August 6, 2011, alongside Kamen Rider OOO Wonderful: The Shogun and the 21 Core Medals. The event of the movie takes place between episode 23 and 24.

==== Gokaiger vs. Gavan ====
The film Kaizoku Sentai Gokaiger vs. Space Sheriff Gavan (海賊戦隊ゴーカイジャーVS宇宙刑事ギャバンTHE MOVIE, Kaizoku Sentai Gōkaijā Tai Uchū Keiji Gyaban Za Mūbī) was released in theaters on January 21, 2012. This is the first Vs. Series crossover film that does not feature another Super Sentai team, but the hero of the first Metal Hero Series: Space Sheriff Gavan. The heroes of Tokumei Sentai Go-Busters also make a cameo appearance in the film. The event of the movie takes place between episode 46 and 47.

==== Super Hero Taisen ====
Kamen Rider × Super Sentai: Super Hero Taisen (仮面ライダー×スーパー戦隊 スーパーヒーロー大戦, Kamen Raidā × Sūpā Sentai: Sūpā Hīrō Taisen) is a film which features a crossover between the characters of the Super Sentai and Kamen Rider Series. The protagonists of Gokaiger and Kamen Rider Decade are featured, as well as those of Kamen Rider Fourze, Kamen Rider OOO, and Go-Busters.

==== Go-Busters vs. Gokaiger ====
Tokumei Sentai Go-Busters vs. Kaizoku Sentai Gokaiger: The Movie (特命戦隊ゴーバスターズVS海賊戦隊ゴーカイジャーTHE MOVIE, Tokumei Sentai Gōbasutāzu Tai Kaizoku Sentai Gōkaijā Za Mūbī) was released in theaters on January 19, 2013. As with previous VS movies, it features a crossover between the casts of Gokaiger and Go-Busters, along the debut of the 37th Super Sentai, Zyuden Sentai Kyoryuger.

==== Super Hero Taisen Z ====
Kamen Rider × Super Sentai × Space Sheriff: Super Hero Taisen Z (仮面ライダー×スーパー戦隊×宇宙刑事 スーパーヒーロー大戦Z, Kamen Raidā × Sūpā Sentai × Uchū Keiji: Supā Hīrō Taisen Zetto) was released on April 27, 2013. It features the first crossover between characters of Toei's three main Tokusatsu franchises, Kamen Rider, Super Sentai, and the Metal Hero Series represented mainly by the Space Sheriff Series. The protagonists of Space Sheriff Gavan: The Movie, Tokumei Sentai Go-Busters, and Kaizoku Sentai Gokaiger are featured, but the casts of Kamen Rider Wizard, Zyuden Sentai Kyoryuger, and Kamen Rider Fourze also participate in the film. Junya Ikeda reprises his role as Gai Ikari, while Ryota Ozawa returns only to voice Gokai Red.

==== Kyuranger vs. Space Squad ====
Uchu Sentai Kyuranger vs. Space Squad (宇宙戦隊キュウレンジャーVSスペース・スクワッド, Uchū Sentai Kyūrenjā Bāsasu Supēsu Sukuwaddo) is a V-Cinema release that features a crossover between Uchu Sentai Kyuranger and Space Squad. Aside from the main cast of Kyuranger, Yuma Ishigaki and Hiroaki Iwanaga (Space Sheriff Gavan: The Movie), Yuka Hirata (Juken Sentai Gekiranger), Mitsuru Karahashi (Samurai Sentai Shinkenger), Kei Hosogai (Kaizoku Sentai Gokaiger) and Ayame Misaki (Tokumei Sentai Go-Busters) return to reprise their respective roles. The V-Cinema was released on DVD and Blu-ray on August 8, 2018.

==== Red Battle! All Sentai Great Assemble!! ====
Kikai Sentai Zenkaiger the Movie: Red Battle! All Sentai Great Assemble!! (機界戦隊ゼンカイジャー THE MOVIE 赤い戦い！オール戦隊大集会!!, Kikai Sentai Zenkaijā Za Mūbī Akai Tatakai! Ōru Sentai Daishūkai!!) is a film released in Japanese theaters on February 20, 2021, as part of Super Sentai Movie Ranger 2021 (スーパー戦隊MOVIEレンジャー2021, Sūpā Sentai Mūbī Renjā Nisen-nijū-ichi), alongside Mashin Sentai Kiramager the Movie: Be-Bop Dream and Kishiryu Sentai Ryusoulger Special: Memory of Soulmates. Naoya Makoto (Himitsu Sentai Gorenger), Kei Hosogai (Kaizoku Sentai Gokaiger), and Jingi Irie (Kaitou Sentai Lupinranger VS Keisatsu Sentai Patranger) reprise their respective roles, and Nobutoshi Canna (Doubutsu Sentai Zyuohger) and Megumi Han (Shuriken Sentai Ninninger) reprise their respective voice roles.

=== V-Cinema ===
==== Ten Gokaiger ====
Gokaiger initially had a V-Cinema adaptation planned before it was canceled in the aftermath of the 2011 Tōhoku earthquake. Kaizoku Sentai: Ten Gokaiger (テン・ゴーカイジャー, Ten Gōkaijā) is a V-Cinema release which received a limited theatrical release on November 12, 2021, followed by its DVD and Blu-ray release on March 9, 2022. The V-Cinema commemorates the 10th anniversary of the series, making of Gokaiger the fourth series of the franchise receiving a tenth-anniversary special film after Ninpuu Sentai Hurricaneger, Tokusou Sentai Dekaranger and Engine Sentai Go-onger. In addition, Kohei Shoji reprises his role from Mashin Sentai Kiramager.

==== Zenkaiger vs. Kiramager vs. Senpaiger ====
Kikai Sentai Zenkaiger vs. Kiramager vs. Senpaiger (機界戦隊ゼンカイジャーVSキラメイジャーVSセンパイジャー, Kikai Sentai Zenkaijā Tai Kirameijā Tai Senpaijā) is a V-Cinema release that features a crossover between Kikai Sentai Zenkaiger and Mashin Sentai Kiramager. The V-Cinema received a limited theatrical release on April 29, 2022, followed by its DVD and Blu-ray release on September 28, 2022. Additionally, Ryota Ozawa made an appearance, reprising his role as Captain Marvelous/Gokai Red, alongside Asahi Ito of Kaitou Sentai Lupinranger VS Keisatsu Sentai Patranger reprising his role as Kairi Yano/Lupin Red. The events of the V-Cinema take place after the final episode of Zenkaiger.

==== Gozyuger vs. Boonboomger ====
No.1 Sentai Gozyuger vs. Boonboomger (ナンバーワン戦隊ゴジュウジャーVSブンブンジャー, Nanbā Wan Sentai Gojūjā Tai Bunbunjā) is a V-Cinema release that features a crossover between No.1 Sentai Gozyuger and Bakuage Sentai Boonboomger. The V-Cinema received a limited theatrical release on March 20, 2026, followed by its DVD and Blu-ray release on July 29, 2026. The events of the film take place after the end of the series. Masaki Nakao, Ryota Ozawa and Mitsuomi Takahashi also reprise their respective roles as Yamato Kazakiri/Zyuoh Eagle from Doubutsu Sentai Zyuohger, Captain Marvelous/Gokai Red from Kaizoku Sentai Gokaiger and Satoru Akashi/Bouken Red from GoGo Sentai Boukenger.

=== Web episodes ===
Twokaizer × Gokaiger: The Tanuki-Charmed June Bride (ツーカイザー×ゴーカイジャー ～ジューンブライドはたぬき味～, Tsūkaizā Kakeru Gōkaijā Jūn Buraido wa Tanuki-aji) is a web-exclusive crossover series released on Toei Tokusatsu Fan Club on June 5, 2022, featuring characters from Gokaiger and Kikai Sentai Zenkaiger. Ryota Ozawa, Yui Koike, and Junya Ikeda return to reprise their respective roles as Captain Marvelous/Gokai Red, Ahim de Famille/Gokai Pink and Gai Ikari/Gokai Silver respectively.

=== A Day of One Hero ===
A Day of One Hero, Starring Kazuki Shimizu (A DAY of one HERO 清水一希 主演, A Dē obu wan Hīrō Shimizu Kazuki Shuen) is a direct-to-video film released on November 21, 2011, starring Kazuki Shimizu as himself in a mockumentary of his acting career as Don "Doc" Dogoier in Gokaiger. The film also features cameo appearances by Tokusatsu veteran actors Yoshio Yamaguchi and Nao Nagasawa.

=== Doubutsu Sentai Zyuohger appearance ===
As part of a special celebration for the 40th anniversary of the Super Sentai Series, the entire Gokaiger cast made a special appearance on episodes 28 (September 4, 2016) and 29 (September 11th, 2016), commemorating the 1,999th and 2,000th episodes of the entire franchise, including a new updated version of the Gokaiger ED titled 'Super Hero Getter 2016'.

== Video games ==
Super Sentai Battle: Ranger Cross (スーパー戦隊バトル レンジャークロス, Sūpā Sentai Batoru Renjā Kurosu) is a Wii action game developed by Bandai Namco Games which features the protagonists of Gokaiger, Tensou Sentai Goseiger, Samurai Sentai Shinkenger, Engine Sentai Go-onger, and Himitsu Sentai Gorenger. It was released on September 9, 2011. The game play is beat-them up like Dynasty Warriors series

A Nintendo DS game for Gokaiger called Kaizoku Sentai Gokaiger: Gathered Transformation! 35 Sentai! (海賊戦隊ゴーカイジャー あつめて変身!35戦隊!, Kaizoku Sentai Gōkaijā Atsumete Henshin! Sanjūgo Sentai!) was released on November 17, 2011.

== Cast ==
- Captain Marvelous (キャプテン・マーベラス, Kyaputen Māberasu): Ryota Ozawa (小澤 亮太, Ozawa Ryōta)
- Joe Gibken (ジョー・ギブケン, Jō Gibuken): Yuki Yamada (山田 裕貴, Yamada Yūki)
- Luka Millfy (ルカ・ミルフィ, Ruka Mirufi): Mao Ichimichi (市道 真央, Ichimichi Mao)
- Don Dogoier (ドン･ドッゴイヤー, Don Doggoiyā): Kazuki Shimizu (清水 一希, Shimizu Kazuki)
- Ahim de Famille (アイム・ド・ファミーユ, Aimu do Famīyu): Yui Koike (小池 唯, Koike Yui)
- Gai Ikari (伊狩 鎧, Ikari Gai): Junya Ikeda (池田 純矢, Ikeda Jun'ya)
- Basco Ta Jolokia (バスコ・タ・ジョロキア, Basuko Ta Jorokia): Kei Hosogai (細貝 圭, Hosogai Kei)

=== Voice cast ===
- Navi (ナビィ, Nabyi): Yukari Tamura (田村 ゆかり, Tamura Yukari)
- Commander Warz Gill (司令官ワルズ・ギル, Shireikan Waruzu Giru): Hirofumi Nojima (野島 裕史, Nojima Hirofumi)
- Chief of Staff Damarasu (参謀長ダマラス, Sanbōchō Damarasu): Kōji Ishii (石井 康嗣, Ishii Kōji)
- Development Technical Officer Insarn (開発技官インサーン, Kaihatsu Gikan Insān): Kikuko Inoue (井上 喜久子, Inoue Kikuko)
- Sid Bamick (シド・バミック, Shido Bamikku)/Special Duty Officer Barizorg (特務士官バリゾーグ, Tokumu Shikan Barizōgu): Gaku Shindo (進藤 学, Shindō Gaku)
- Emperor Akudos Gill (皇帝アクドス・ギル, Kōtei Akudosu Giru): Shinji Ogawa (小川 真司, Ogawa Shinji)
- Dairando (ダイランドー, Dairandō): Masashi Ebara (江原 正士, Ebara Masashi)
- Fuuraimaru (風雷丸, Fūraimaru): Hironori Miyata (宮田 浩徳, Miyata Hironori)
- Engine Machalcon (炎神マッハルコン, Enjin Mahharukon): Hiroaki Hirata (平田 広明, Hirata Hiroaki)
- Narrator, Gokaiger Equipment, Greatest Treasure in the Universe (宇宙最大のお宝, Uchū Saidai no Otakara; 49–50): Tomokazu Seki (関 智一, Seki Tomokazu)

=== Guest cast ===
- Tsuyoshi Kaijo: Naoya Makoto (誠 直也, Makoto Naoya)
- Aka Red (Voice): Tōru Furuya (古谷 徹, Furuya Tōru)
- Kai Ozu: Atsushi Hashimoto (橋本 淳, Hashimoto Atsushi)
- Spell Voice: Tesshō Genda (玄田 哲章, Genda Tesshō)
- Banban "Ban" Akaza: Ryuji Sainei (載寧 龍二, Sainei Ryūji)
- Marika "Jasmine" Reimon: Ayumi Kinoshita (木下 あゆ美, Kinoshita Ayumi)
- Doggie Kruger (Voice): Tetsu Inada (稲田 徹, Inada Tetsu)
- Kozo Kasugai: Kentarō Shimazu (島津 健太郎, Shimazu Kentarō)
- Jyan Kandou: Hiroki Suzuki (鈴木 裕樹, Suzuki Hiroki)
- Master Shafu (Voice): Ichirō Nagai (永井 一郎, Nagai Ichirō)
- Cosmic Kenpō Master Pachacamac XIII (Voice): Yasunori Masutani (増谷 康紀, Masutani Yasunori)
- Kakeru Shishi: Noboru Kaneko (金子 昇, Kaneko Noboru)
- Kaoru Shiba: Runa Natsui (夏居 瑠奈, Natsui Runa)
- Toshizo Tanba: Kazuyuki Matsuzawa (松澤 一之, Matsuzawa Kazuyuki)
- Eikichi Nashida: Takashi Yamanaka (山中 崇, Yamanaka Takashi)
- Kyosuke Jinnai: Yūji Kishi (岸 祐二, Kishi Yūji)
- Mikoto Nakadai: Koutaro Tanaka (田中 幸太朗, Tanaka Kōtarō)
- Hyuuga: Teruaki Ogawa (小川 輝晃, Ogawa Teruaki)
- Ryouma: Kazuki Maehara (前原 一輝, Maehara Kazuki)
- Satoru Akashi: Mitsuomi Takahashi (高橋 光臣, Takahashi Mitsuomi)
- Creator King Ryuuwon (Voice): Junpei Morita (森田 順平, Morita Junpei)
- Jaryuu (Voice): Tamotsu Nishiwaki (西脇 保, Nishiwaki Tamotsu)
- Matsuri Tatsumi: Kayoko Shibata (柴田 かよこ, Shibata Kayoko)
- Yousuke Shiina: Shun Shioya (塩谷 瞬, Shioya Shun)
- Nanami Nono: Nao Nagasawa (長澤 奈央, Nagasawa Nao)
- Kouta Bitou: Kohei Yamamoto (山本 康平, Yamamoto Kōhei)
- Satarakura Jr. (Voice): Bin Shimada (島田 敏, Shimada Bin)
- Sandaaru Jr. (Voice): Shūichi Ikeda (池田 秀一, Ikeda Shūichi)
- Gai Yuki: Toshihide Wakamatsu (若松 俊秀, Wakamatsu Toshihide)
- Yukito Sanjo: Sho Tomita (富田 翔, Tomita Shō)
- Emiri Sanjo: Michi Nishijima (西島 未智, Nishijima Michi)
- Joh Ohara: Kazuhiko Nishimura (西村 和彦, Nishimura Kazuhiko)
- Goro Hoshino: Masaru Shishido (宍戸 勝, Shishido Masaru)
- Momo Maruo: Tamao Satō (さとう 珠緒, Satō Tamao)
- Ryo of the Heavenly Fire Star: Keiichi Wada (和田 圭市, Wada Keiichi)
- Masa: Kazuo Niibori (新堀 和男, Nībori Kazuo)
- Cain: Yuki Kimisawa (君沢 ユウキ, Kimisawa Yūki)
- Sōsuke Esumi: Yasuhisa Furuhara (古原 靖久, Furuhara Yasuhisa)
- Speedor (Voice): Daisuke Namikawa (浪川 大輔, Namikawa Daisuke)
- Bus-on (Voice): Hisao Egawa (江川 央生, Egawa Hisao)
- Bear-RV (Voice): Miki Inoue (井上 美紀, Inoue Miki)
- Bomper (Voice): Akiko Nakagawa (中川 亜紀子, Nakagawa Akiko)
- Pollution President Babatcheed (Voice): Banjō Ginga (銀河 万丈, Ginga Banjō)
- Kenta Date: Hayato Ōshiba (大柴 隼人, Ōshiba Hayato)
- Domon: Shūhei Izumi (和泉 宗兵, Izumi Shūhei)
- Honami Moriyama: Tamao Yoshimura] (吉村 玉緒, Yoshimura Tamao)
- Shitari of the Bones (Voice): Chō (チョー)
- Metal-A of the Agent (Voice): Marina Inoue (井上 麻里奈, Inoue Marina)
- Zan-KT0 of the Shot (Voice): Tora Take (武 虎, Take Tora)
- Shiro Akebono: Kenji Ohba (大葉 健二, Ōba Kenji)
- Ninjaman (Voice): Kazuki Yao (矢尾 一樹, Yao Kazuki)
- Tsuruhime: Satomi Hirose (広瀬 仁美, Hirose Satomi)
- Takayuki Hiba: Takayuki Godai (五代 高之, Godai Takayuki)
- Sho Hayate: Kazuoki Takahashi (和興)
- Dai: Kihachirō Uemura (植村 喜八郎, Uemura Kihachirō)
- Akira: Issei Hirota (廣田 一成, Hirota Issei)
- Remi Hoshikawa: Ryo Narushima (成嶋 涼, Narushima Ryō)
- Goushi: Seiju Umon (右門 青寿, Umon Seiju)
- Professor Shuichiro Amachi: Louis Yamada LIII (山田ルイ53世, Yamada Rui Gojūsan-sei)
- Yuka Yamazaki: Kaoru Hirata (平田 薫, Hirata Kaoru)
- Shoji of the Heavenly Gravity Star: Ei Hamura (羽村 英, Hamura Ei)
- Kazu of the Heavenly Time Star: Keisuke Tsuchiya (土屋 圭輔, Tsuchiya Keisuke)
- Shou Tatsumi: Atsushi Harada (原田 篤, Harada Atsushi)
- Houka Ozu: Ayumi Beppu (別府 あゆみ, Beppu Ayumi)
- Miu Sutō: Yumi Sugimoto (杉本 有美, Sugimoto Yumi)

== Songs ==
Opening theme

- "Kaizoku Sentai Gokaiger" (海賊戦隊ゴーカイジャー, Kaizoku Sentai Gōkaijā)
  - Lyrics: Yuho Iwasato
  - Composition: Yūsuke Mochida (持田 裕輔, Mochida Yūsuke)
  - Arrangement: Project.R (Hiroaki Kagoshima)
  - Artist: Tsuyoshi Matsubara (Project.R) with Young Fresh (Project.R)

Ending theme

- "Super Sentai Hero Getter" (スーパー戦隊 ヒーローゲッター, Sūpā Sentai Hīrō Gettā)
  - Lyrics: Shoko Fujibayashi & Naruhisa Arakawa
  - Composition: Kenichiro Ōishi
  - Arrangement: Project.R (Kenichiro Ōishi)
  - Artist: Project.R

The series' ending theme "Super Sentai Hero Getter" lists off all of the Super Sentai series, making reference to their songs and motifs, with each of the three verses of the song being played in rotation. The first verse covers Himitsu Sentai Gorenger through Choujyu Sentai Liveman, which all aired in the Shōwa period; the second covers Kousoku Sentai Turboranger through Mirai Sentai Timeranger, which all aired through the remainder of the 20th century; and the last one covers Hyakujuu Sentai Gaoranger through Tensou Sentai Goseiger, which were all broadcast in the 21st century.

The song is remixed into "Super Sentai Hero Getter ~ 199 ver." from their first team-up movie (eliminating all but one of the choruses) and then "Super Sentai Hero Getter ~ Now & Forever ver." in the final episode, the latter remix covering Gokaiger and Tokumei Sentai Go-Busters.

A second version titled "Super Sentai Hero Getter 2016" was released in episodes 28 and 29 of Doubutsu Sentai Zyuohger during the celebrations of the 2000th episode of the franchise, with two verses, including the first 40 Super Sentai Series. The first verse covers the 20 earlier series from Gorenger to Gekisou Sentai Carranger and the second one covers the 20 late entries, from Denji Sentai Megaranger to Zyuohger.

A third version titled "Super Sentai Hero Getter ~Ten Gokaiger ver.~" was released in 2021 as the ending song of the film Kaizoku Sentai: Ten Gokaiger which celebrates the 10th anniversary of the series, including the first 45 Super Sentai Series in three verses with 15 series each, the first covering from Gorenger to Chōjin Sentai Jetman, the second covering from Kyōryū Sentai Zyuranger to GoGo Sentai Boukenger and the third covering from Juken Sentai Gekiranger to Kikai Sentai Zenkaiger.
