= BIMA Satria Garuda =

- BIMA Satria Garuda logo
- Created by: Reino Barack; Ishimori Production
- Developed by: MNC Media; Ishimori Productions
- Starring: Christian Loho; Rayhan Febrian; Stella Cornelia; Adhitya Alkatiri; Sutan Simatupang
- Theme music composer: Aghi Narottama; Bembi Gusti
- Opening theme: "Seperti Bintang" by Ungu
- Composer: Arlonsy Miraldi
- Country of origin: Indonesia
- Original language: Indonesian
- No. of seasons: 1
- No. of episodes: 26

Production
- Executive producer: Reino Barack
- Producer: Robert Ronny
- Production location: Greater Jakarta
- Camera setup: So Takahashi (J.S.C.); Fadjar Soebekti
- Running time: 21 minutes
- Production companies: MNC Media; Ishimori Productions

Original release
- Network: RCTI
- Release: 30 June – 22 December 2013

Related
- Satria Garuda BIMA-X; Satria Heroes: Revenge of Darkness (film 2017); Bima-S (animation series)

BIMA Satria Garuda ('Garuda Knight BIMA') is an Indonesian tokusatsu and comic series, the result of cooperation between MNC Media with Ishimori Productions, creator of the Japanese Kamen Rider Series. Starring Christian Loho, Rayhan Febrian, Stella Cornelia (then of JKT48), Adhitya Alkatiri, and Sutan Simatupang, BIMA Satria Garuda premiered on RCTI on 30 June 2013.

Following the success of the series, 50 episodes of a second season titled Satria Garuda BIMA-X were developed. This season premiered as Satria Garuda BIMA-X: New Beginning on RCTI on Sunday 7 September 2014, at 08.30 pm. The series' first theatrical film, Satria Heroes: Revenge of Darkness, premiered in May 2017. After the release of the film, Bima-X will be succeeded by a new dragon hero in form of Satria Naga/Satria Heroes Kai with the release of the show's pilot episode in 2019. However, the plans for the show changed from tokusatsu to a 3D-Animated superhero cartoon starting in 2020. The series is also considered as an inspiration for MNC Animation's superhero animated series Bima-S.

== Production ==
BIMA Satria Garuda is a superhero series inspired by Kamen Rider Black and Kamen Rider Black RX, collectively known in Indonesia as "Ksatria Baja Hitam" ("Black Steel Knight"). BIMA Satria Garuda features Indonesian culture and films in Greater Jakarta. According to Reino Barack, Senior Vice President of Global Mediacom as well as Executive Producer of the series, BIMA Satria Garuda represents a new business model in the world of Indonesian entertainment, which offers services in licensing, sponsorship, built in advertising, and merchandising. MNC Media (which is majority-owned by Global Mediacom) in cooperation with Itochu is the main licensee for BIMA Satria Garuda in building licensing business in Indonesia. MNC Media has also worked with Bandai to produce "BIMA Satria Garuda" merchandise toys, which were released in Indonesia after the series premiered on June 30, 2013.

== Story ==
The story of BIMA Satria Garuda begins in the Dunia Paralel ("Parallel World"), a world that is ruled by the VUDO Empire and is on the verge of collapse. The Parallel World lives in perpetual darkness and Rasputin, the evil and cruel lord of VUDO wants to find another world, seize its natural resources to revive the Parallel World, and expand VUDO's powers. This new world is discovered when two scientists on Earth manage to create a portal that connects the Earth to other galaxies.

A mysterious young man name Mikhail gives Ray Bramasakti the Power Stone Merah ("Red") to stop Rasputin and VUDO's evil attempts to take over Earth. By possessing the Power Stone Merah, Ray has the power to transform into BIMA, the Garuda Knight. Ray's foster family, Randy Iskandar and his sister Rena, also become involved in Ray's fight against the malicious activities of Rasputin and VUDO.

== Comic ==
Reino Barack, executive producer and co-creator of BIMA Satria Garuda announced via his Twitter account that a series of comics which is based on the story of BIMA Satria Garuda will be published on 24 November 2013. The comic is illustrated by a duo of comic artists Ockto Baringbing and Hendry Zero. The comic is published with the cooperation of RCTI and Ishimori Productions and distributed through Alfamart outlets in the Greater Jakarta area. The comics has over 5 volumes released so far, and has been added to MNC Group's webcomic platform Klaklik in 2020s.

== Characters ==
=== Main characters ===
- Ray Bramasakti/BIMA, the "Satria Garuda" ("Garuda Knight"), protagonist and super hero. Kind, quiet, and humble, Ray is an orphan who lived with his foster family, Randy and Rena. Ray works in the Satria Motors auto shop. He possesses the Power Stone Merah ("Red") and uses it to protect Earth from VUDO's attacks. The Power Stone Merah can transform him into BIMA, the Garuda Knight which has the agility, focus, and strength of the Garuda and allows him to wield the red-blue garuda saber Helios (Sun) (which in turn can transform into Helios Blaster bow). Ray does not wish to endanger his foster family, which causes him to struggle with his power and responsibility as BIMA. Ray is portrayed by Christian Loho.
- Randy Iskandar, Rena's brother, Ray's foster brother, and the owner of the Satria Motors autoshop. Randy acts as a friend and an unlikely father figure for Rena and Ray. He also is Ray's best friend since school and knows Ray's struggle as BIMA. He is Ray's silat sparring partner and occasional side-kick. He inherited considerable wealth from his parents, who disappeared in his childhood. Randy is portrayed by Rayhan Febrian.
- Rena Iskandar, the younger sister of Randy and Ray's foster sister. Rena behaves naïve and innocent and tends to be careless and unlucky. She wants to help Ray but often gets into trouble with VUDO. Rena has great respect for Ray and Randy, though she develops romantic feelings for Ray. Rena is portrayed by Stella Cornelia.
- Mikhail, is a mysterious young man from Parallel World. Mikhail fled a VUDO warship carrying the Power Stone Merah. He does not communicate much with humans and only communicates with Ray telepathically. Mikhail is then revealed to be Reza Bramasakti, Ray's long-lost brother who is thought to have died 21 years before the start of the saga. Mikhail is transformed into Azazel, VUDO Empire's Champion Ksatria Kegelapan ("Dark Knight") by Rasputin's Power Stone Hitam ("Black"), which strips away his humanity and forces him to serve VUDO and invade Earth until BIMA manages to bring him back to his senses. He later joins Ray's struggle against Rasputin. Azazel wields the dark garuda saber Taranis (Thunder), which is similar to BIMA's Helios saber and can transform into the Taranis Blaster bow. Mikhail is portrayed by Adhitya Alkatiri.
- Paman Iwan ("Uncle" Iwan), a kind relative of the Iskandars who took care of Ray, Randy, and Rena after their parents disappeared. Uncle Iwan is a very patient person with a big appetite. Uncle Iwan is portrayed by Abio Abie.

=== VUDO Empire ===
- Rasputin, evil lord of VUDO Empire, owner of the deadly Power Stone Hitam ("Black"). He comes from the Parallel World and wants to invade Earth to give life back to the Parallel World. Rasputin is portrayed by Sutan Simatupang.
- Topeng Besi ("Iron Mask"), the right-hand man of Rasputin and the Panglima ("Commander") of VUDO. He possesses the Power Stone Biru ("Blue"). Topeng Besi wears steel armor covering his entire body and is armed with destroyer claws on his gauntlet. Topeng Besi is voiced by Heru Setiadi.
- VUDO Soldiers/Kombatan, Rasputin's foot soldiers derived from the bones of the dead, given life by Rasputin's magic power.
- Grand Gator, the VUDO Empire's ultimate weapon-machine to conquer Earth. Shrouded in mystery, this ultimate weapon can only be awakened by combining all seven of VUDO's Power Stones, including "Shadow Crisis" elite officer's Power Stones.

==== VUDO monsters ====
VUDO's monsters are VUDO combatant officers that gain power from absorbing the soul of humans.

- Lizarion, the lizard monster, can crawl on walls and elongate his arms to attack its prey.
- Gremontis, the toad monster, is armed with a magic staff and has the power to manipulate the human mind to do its commands through hypnosis.
- Aracnofus, the spider monster, is an agile monster armed with spears and spider web.
- Octopoda, the octopus monster, sprays a blinding ink.
- Valcus, the electric scorpion monster, is armed with twin swords. It can destroy human senses by powerful electric shock from its tail-sting.
- Gills, the cobra monster, fights with a venomous staff and fangs.
- Megalodon, the shark monster, is armed with a pair of cannons on his shoulders.

==== Shadow Crisis Ultimate Four ====
The Shadow Crisis Ultimate Four quartet is a group of elite VUDO officers with the sole mission to kill BIMA and retrieve the stolen Power Stones to activate the Grand Gator machine. Shadow Crisis first appears in Episode 18.

- Zacros, the goat monster, armed with a horned spear, has the Power Stone Ungu ("Purple") and can manipulate dreams and create a world of illusion.
- Karax, the raven monster, armed with a long sword, is capable of flying and has the power from Power Stone Putih ("White") to shoot sharp feathers imbued with explosive ice magic.
- Vargulf, the wolf monster, armed with a great sword and a destructive roar, has enormous physical power from Power Stone Hijau ("Green").
- Velifer, the bat monster, the strongest officer among the Shadow Crisis, is armed with double-sided spears and has the ability to summon VUDO monster ghouls. Velifer has a paralyzing thunder shout power given to him by the Power Stone Kuning ("Yellow").

=== Supporting cast ===
- Professor Rudy Bramasakti, Ray's father. Together with Professor Andri Iskandar, Rudy created an inter-dimensional portal connecting Earth and Parallel World, revealing Earth to VUDO as a target for conquest. Rudy, his wife Risha, and his youngest son Reza died in the event of Topeng Besi's assault, 21 years before the arrival of Mikhail, leaving Ray as the sole survivor. His phantom appears to Mikhail as he is held captive in Rasputin's prison. Professor Rudy Bramasakti is portrayed by Gito Gilas,
- Professor Andri Iskandar, Randy and Rena's father disappeared with his wife. Together with Professor Rudy Bramasakti created an inter-dimensional portal connecting Earth and Parallel World. Professor Andri and his wife adopted Ray after the death of his family. Andri mysteriously disappeared with his wife, leaving Randy, Rena, and Ray in the care of Paman Iwan. He appears with his wife in flashbacks. Professor Andri Iskandar is portrayed by Edi Rahmat.
- Risha Bramasakti, Ray's mother. Risha died in the event of Topeng Besi's assault, 21 years before the arrival of Mikhail. She appears as a phantom to Mikhail as he is held captive in Rasputin's prison. Risha Bramasakti is portrayed by Cinta Dewi.
- Fira Iskandar, Randy and Rena's mother disappeared along with her husband. She appears with her Husband in flashbacks. Fira Iskandar is portrayed by Febrie Key.
- Noir, the "BIMA Legend" Knight. A mysterious figure from Parallel World dons a black cape and clutches three suzu bells. He possesses the power of "Dark Zar" which can teleport him between worlds. Noir is portrayed by Japanese pop singer Gackt, who appears as a guest star in Episodes 21 and 22, and guest voice in Episode 20.

== Episodes ==
Episode	Original airdate	Enemy Monster	Director	Writer
"Episode 01"	30 June 2013	Topeng Besi	Teruyoshi Ishii; Arnandha Wyanto	Masato Hayase; Ari Syarif / Kevin Anderson; Robert Ronny
"Episode 02"	7 July 2013	Topeng Besi	Teruyoshi Ishii; Arnandha Wyanto	Masato Hayase; Ari Syarif / Kevin Anderson; Robert Ronny
"Episode 03"	14 July 2013	Lizarion (Lizard)	Teruyoshi Ishii; Arnandha Wyanto	Masato Hayase; Ari Syarif / Kevin Anderson; Robert Ronny
"Episode 04"	21 July 2013	Gremontis (Toad)	Teruyoshi Ishii; Raesaka Yunus	Masato Hayase; Ari Syarif / Kevin Anderson; Robert Ronny; Vera Varidia
"Episode 05"	28 July 2013	Gremontis (Toad)	Teruyoshi Ishii; Raesaka Yunus	Masato Hayase; Ari Syarif / Kevin Anderson; Robert Ronny; Vera Varidia
"Episode 06"	4 August 2013	Aracnofus (Spider)	Teruyoshi Ishii; Raesaka Yunus	Masato Hayase; Ari Syarif / Kevin Anderson; Robert Ronny; Vera Varidia
"Episode 07"	11 August 2013	Aracnofus (Spider)	Teruyoshi Ishii; Raesaka Yunus	Masato Hayase; Ari Syarif / Kevin Anderson; Robert Ronny; Vera Varidia
"Episode 08"	18 August 2013	Octopoda (Octopus)	Teruyoshi Ishii; Arnandha Wyanto	Masato Hayase; Ari Syarif / Kevin Anderson; Robert Ronny
"Episode 09"	25 August 2013	Octopoda (Octopus)	Teruyoshi Ishii; Arnandha Wyanto	Masato Hayase; Ari Syarif / Kevin Anderson; Robert Ronny; Vera Varidia
"Episode 10"	1 September 2013	Valcus (Scorpion)	Teruyoshi Ishii; Arnandha Wyanto	Masato Hayase; Ari Syarif / Kevin Anderson; Robert Ronny
"Episode 11"	8 September 2013	Valcus (Scorpion)	Teruyoshi Ishii; Arnandha Wyanto	Masato Hayase; Ari Syarif / Kevin Anderson; Robert Ronny
"Episode 12"	15 September 2013	Gills (Cobra)	Teruyoshi Ishii; Raesaka Yunus	Masato Hayase; Ari Syarif / Kevin Anderson; Robert Ronny
"Episode 13"	22 September 2013	Gills (Cobra)	Teruyoshi Ishii; Raesaka Yunus	Masato Hayase; Ari Syarif / Kevin Anderson; Robert Ronny
"Episode 14"	29 September 2013	Azazel; Megalodon (Shark)	Hideki Oka; Arnandha Wyanto	Masato Hayase; Ari Syarif / Kevin Anderson; Robert Ronny
"Episode 15"	6 October 2013	Azazel; Megalodon (Shark)	Hideki Oka; Arnandha Wyanto	Masato Hayase; Ari Syarif / Kevin Anderson; Robert Ronny
"Episode 16"	13 October 2013	Azazel; Topeng Besi	Teruyoshi Ishii; Raesaka Yunus	Takeshi Nakazawa; Hideki Oka
"Episode 17"	20 October 2013	Azazel; Topeng Besi	Teruyoshi Ishii; Raesaka Yunus	Takeshi Nakazawa; Hideki Oka
"Episode 18"	27 October 2013	Zacros (Goat)	Hideki Oka; Arnandha Wyanto	Takeshi Nakazawa; Hideki Oka
"Episode 19"	3 November 2013	Zacros (Goat)	Hideki Oka; Arnandha Wyanto	Takeshi Nakazawa; Hideki Oka
"Episode 20"	10 November 2013	Karax (Raven)	Hideki Oka; Arnandha Wyanto	Takeshi Nakazawa; Hideki Oka
"Episode 21"	17 November 2013	Vargulf (Wolf)	Teruyoshi Ishii; Raesaka Yunus	Takeshi Nakazawa; Hideki Oka
"Episode 22"	24 November 2013	Vargulf (Wolf)	Teruyoshi Ishii; Raesaka Yunus	Takeshi Nakazawa; Hideki Oka
"Episode 23"	1 December 2013	Azazel	Hideki Oka; Arnandha Wyanto	Takeshi Nakazawa; Hideki Oka
"Episode 24"	8 December 2013	Velifer (Bat)	Hideki Oka; Arnandha Wyanto	Takeshi Nakazawa; Hideki Oka
"Episode 25"	15 December 2013	Rasputin; Grand Gator	Teruyoshi Ishii; Raesaka Yunus	Takeshi Nakazawa; Hideki Oka
"Episode 26"	22 December 2013	Rasputin; Grand Gator	Teruyoshi Ishii; Raesaka Yunus	Takeshi Nakazawa; Hideki Oka

== Second season ==
In June 2014, MNC announced a second season of the series, Satria Garuda BIMA-X . The second season featured 50 episodes, twice as many as the first season. The series premiered on RCTI on Sunday, September 7, 2014, at 08.30 am, with the title of Satria Garuda BIMA-X: New Beginning.

== Songs ==
Opening and Ending theme

- "Seperti Bintang" (lit. "Stellar")
  - Composition and Arrangement: Onci
  - Artist: Ungu

Other

- "Istimewa" (lit. "Special")
  - Composition and Arrangement: Petra Sihombing /Hits Records
  - Artist: Petra Sihombing
  - Episode: #5

Preceded by N/A	Satria Garuda Series; 2013	Succeeded by Satria Garuda BIMA-X
