= Teruyoshi Ishii =

Japanese film and television director

- Occupations: Film director, television director

Teruyoshi Ishii (石井てるよし, Ishii Teruyoshi) is a Japanese film and television director.

== Works ==
- Psychic Vision: Jaganrei (film, 1988)
- Oira Sukeban: Kessen! Pansutō (film, 1992)
- Gridman the Hyper Agent (TV series, 1993–1994)
- Kuchisake-onna (film, 1996)
- Kyōfu Shinbun (ja) (film, 1996)
- Ultraman Tiga (TV series, 1996–1997)
- Ultraman Dyna (TV series, 1997–1998)
- Ultraman Cosmos (TV series, 2001–2002)
- Genseishin Justirisers (TV series, 2004–2005)
- Abashiri Ikka (film, 2009)
- BIMA Satria Garuda (TV series, 2013)
- Satria Garuda BIMA-X (TV series, 2014)
- Bloody Doll (film, 2014)
