= Hiroki Asai =

American graphic designer and creative director

- Education: California Polytechnic State University, San Luis Obispo (BA)
- Occupation: Chief marketing officer
- Employer: Airbnb

Hiroki Asai is an American graphic designer and creative director. From 2000 to 2016, he worked in Apple's Marketing Communications division in various roles like Executive Creative Director and Vice President; there, he worked on marketing campaigns for several of Apple's products like the iPhone and the iPad among others. In 2020, Asai became Airbnb's Global Head of Marketing. In 2022, Asai was named a Brand Genius honoree by Adweek.

== Education ==
Asai grew up in Cupertino, California. He attended California Polytechnic State University, San Luis Obispo and graduated with a BA in graphic design.

== Career ==
After college, Asai worked as a graphic designer. Starting in 2000, Asai then spent 16 years in marketing at Apple in several roles in Marketing Communications, including Executive Creative Director and Vice President. There, he assisted and facilitated marketing campaigns for several of Apple's products like the iMac, iPhone, and Apple Watch, among others. In 2016, Asai left Apple, after which Tor Myren succeeded him in the role of Vice President of Marketing Communications.

In July of 2020, Asai became the Global Head of Marketing at Airbnb. There, he has led and grown the company's in-house creative and marketing team which has since hired hundreds of creatives. When asked about his stance on in-house production, Asai stated, "I'm a firm believer that creative should be at the table with products, with designers, engineers, marketers, all working from the same insight." Airbnb co-founder and CEO, Brian Chesky, called Asai "somebody who changed the trajectory of the company"; Chesky cited him and Jony Ive as ex-Apple hires who helped him realize Steve Jobs' leadership methodology in himself as he was rebuilding and restructuring Airbnb during the COVID-19 pandemic.

In 2021, Asai pivoted Airbnb's marketing budget toward branding, resulting in the creation of advertisements and commercials that "go back to the core of what Airbnb was about–which is about core hosts, primary homes and guests." Asai had noticed that Airbnb was losing its sense of "uniqueness" in comparison to hotels and other lodging options; thus, he intended for Airbnb to focus less on performance metrics and returning to a simpler, straightforward marketing campaign of differentiating Airbnb from its competitors.

In 2024, Asai spearheaded the development of Icons, a set of Airbnb's special pop culture-related experiences, after witnessing the success of the Barbie Dreamhouse listing in 2023 as well as other listings like the Home Alone house. Upon its launch in the summer, Asai stated that "[Icons] keeps Airbnb at the pulse of culture. From a marketing perspective, it really allows us to reach new segments of people, new demographics, and most importantly, new geographies." In terms of results, Asai stated that he intended for Icons to drive "awareness and traffic" to Airbnb and bringing on new customers to its vision; he also stated that certain Icons would hopefully help Airbnb's popularity in regions like India and Latin America.

Asai has been featured on podcasts like The Speed of Culture Podcast and the Digiday Podcast where he has discussed Airbnb's branding and narrative strategy. He is also a senior advisor at SYPartners, a management consulting firm.

== Personal life ==
Asai lives in the San Francisco Bay Area with his family.

== Awards and honors ==
- 2022, Brand Genius honoree by Adweek
