= Junko Kōmura =

Japanese screenwriter

- Born: May 28, 1976 (age 50); Aichi Prefecture, Japan
- Citizenship: Japanese
- Occupations: Screenwriter, Lyricist
- Writing career
- Language: Japanese
- Genre: Science fiction

Junko Komura (香村純子, Komura Junko; born May 28, 1976) is a Japanese screenwriter who works primarily on Tokusatsu and anime. The first time she was the main writer for a Super Sentai Series was Doubutsu Sentai Zyuohger.

== Filmography ==
=== Tokusatsu ===
==== Television series ====
- series head writer denoted in bold
- Engine Sentai Go-onger (2008-2009)
- Tensou Sentai Goseiger (2010-2011)
- Kaizoku Sentai Gokaiger (2011-2012)
- **Kamen Rider Wizard** (2012-2013)
- Unofficial Sentai Akibaranger (2012)
- **Satria Garuda BIMA-X** (2014-2015)
- Kamen Rider Drive (2014-2015)
- **Doubutsu Sentai Zyuohger** (2016-2017)
- **Kaitou Sentai Lupinranger VS Keisatsu Sentai Patranger** (2018-2019)
- **Kikai Sentai Zenkaiger** (2021-2022)
- **Kamen Rider Gavv** (2024-2025)

=== Films ===
- Engine Sentai Go-onger vs. Gekiranger (2009)
- Ai Ore (2012)
- Kamen Rider Wizard in Magic Land (2013)
- Kamen Rider × Kamen Rider Gaim & Wizard: The Fateful Sengoku Movie Battle (2013)
- Doubutsu Sentai Zyuohger the Movie: The Exciting Circus Panic! (2016)
- Doubutsu Sentai Zyuohger vs. Ninninger the Movie: Super Sentai's Message from the Future (2017)
- Kaitou Sentai Lupinranger VS Keisatsu Sentai Patranger - en Film (2018)
- Ryusoulger VS Lupinranger VS Patranger (2020)
- Kikai Sentai Zenkaiger THE MOVIE: Red Battle! All Sentai Grand Gathering!! (2021)
- Kamen Rider Gavv: Invaders of the House of Snacks (2025)

=== Anime ===
==== Television series ====
- series head writer denoted in bold
- Gift: Eternal Rainbow (2006)
- Wolf Girl and Black Prince (2014)
- Go! Princess Pretty Cure (2015-2016)
- B-Project (2016)
- Kirakira Pretty Cure a la Mode (2017-2018)
- **Healin' Good Pretty Cure** (2020-2021)
- Wonderful Pretty Cure! (2024-2025)

=== Films ===
|*Screen play cooperation

- Hug! Pretty Cure Futari wa Pretty Cure: All Stars Memories
- The Ribbon Hero*
