= List of Zyuden Sentai Kyoryuger characters =

This is a character list for the 37th Super Sentai series Zyuden Sentai Kyoryuger (獣電戦隊キョウリュウジャー, Jūden Sentai Kyōryūjā) and its Korean-exclusive sequel series Zyuden Sentai Kyoryuger Brave (獣電戦隊キョウリュウジャーブレイブ, Jūden Sentai Kyōryūjā Bureibu). Aside from dinosaur themes, the series also incorporates Japanese and English wordplay related to the characters and terminologies.

== Main characters ==
=== Kyoryugers ===
The Kyoryugers transformed. From left to right: Ian Yorkland, Nobuharu Udo, Utsusemimaru, Daigo Kiryu, Amy Yuuzuki, and Souji Rippukan.

The eponymous Kyoryugers, also known as the "People of the Great and Mighty Lizards" (強き竜の者, Tsuyoki Ryū no Mono), are humans partnered with Zyudenryu who defend Earth from the Deboth Army. (Note: The first kana in the first five Kyoryugers' given names spells out "dinosaur" (「ダ・イ・ノ・ソ・ア」（ダイノソア）, "Da-I-No-So-A" (dainosoa)) while the kana in their surnames and that of Utsusemimaru's spells out "dinosaur" (「き・よ・う・り・ゆ・う」（恐竜）, "Ki-Yo-U-Ri-Yu-U" (kyōryū)) in Japanese.) Having witnessed a race of prehistoric people that lived alongside the dinosaurs, Torin created the Kyoryugers with one fundamental in mind: music as means to guide the Zyudenryu alongside humans able to move to the rhythm. The current generation of Kyoryugers are a team of five individuals who utilize the Gaburivolver (ガブリボルバー, Gaburiborubā) firearm to transform and access their Zyuden Arms (獣電アームズ, Jūden Āmuzu) weapons. The group operates out of a shrine called the Spirit Base (スピリットベース, Supiritto Bēsu), which is located in Japan as it is an ideal area to cultivate the Brave (ブレイブ, Bureibu) energy that powers the Kyoryugers' power source, the numbered Zyudenchi (獣電池, Jūdenchi; Beast Batteries), which house the Kyoryu Spirit (キョウリュウスピリット, Kyōryū Supiritto) of the dinosaurs that became the Zyudenryu.

Each Kyoryuger uses their Zyudenryu partner's Zyudenchi to transform and additional Zyudenchi to perform a multitude of attacks. The primary members also each carry a Gaburicalibur (ガブリカリバー, Gaburikaribā) sword, which can combine with the Gaburivolver to form the Gaburu Cannon (ガブルキャノン, Gaburu Kyanon) shotgun. All 10 Kyoryugers possess the Zyuden MoBuckles (獣電モバックル, Jūden Mobakkuru), which can transform into a mobile phone and store up to three Zyudenchi. With an activation cry of "Brave In!" (ブレイブイン！, Bureibu In!), the Kyoryugers can install a Zyudenchi into their weapons and invoke a Brave Charge (ブレイブチャージ, Bureibu Chāji).

After Kyoryu Red gains the ability to assume Kyoryu Red Carnival, the primary Kyoryugers use the Victory (ビクトリー, Bikutorī) Zyudenchi to channel their combined Brave through the Gabutyra de Carnival to perform the Zyuden Victory Finish (獣電ビクトリーフィニッシュ, Jūden Bikutorī Finisshu). Additionally, it can be enhanced further into the Zyuden Victory Maximum Finish (獣電ビクトリーマキシマムフィニッシュ, Jūden Bikutorī Makishimamu Finisshu) with the extra Kyoryugers using the Maximum (マキシマム, Makishimamu) Zyudenchi.

==== Daigo Kiryu ====
Daigo Kiryu (桐生 ダイゴ, Kiryū Daigo), who encourages others to call him "King" (キング, Kingu), is a wild, gallant, and charismatic man who possesses the unique quality to charm anyone into becoming his friend and treasures his relationships above all else. A decade prior to the series, he traveled the world with his father, Dantetsu, before the latter left to fight the Deboth Army. Though he was given the option to return to Japan, Daigo sought to instead follow in his father's footsteps and continue traveling the world. When his journey brought him into a battle against a group of Zorima, Daigo received his Gaburivolver from Torin and battled Gabutyra for a month to tame him. Though he succeeds, Daigo is only able to become the "Fanged Brave" (牙の勇者, Kiba no Yūsha), Kyoryu Red (キョウリュウレッド, Kyōryū Reddo), after convincing Gabutyra to let him fight alongside him and quickly becomes the team's leader.

As Kyoryu Red, Daigo wields the Gabutyra Fang (ガブティラファング, Gabutira Fangu) cestus. In other media not within the series' canon, he acquires additional weapons, such as the self-propelling Plezuon Rocket (プレズオンロケット, Purezuon Roketto) gauntlet through the Plezuon Spirit Ranger Purple Version (プレズオン スピリットレンジャーパープルバージョン, Purezuon Supiritto Renjā Pāpuru Bājon) Zyudenchi during the DVD special Zyuden Sentai Kyoryuger: It's Here! Armed On Midsummer Festival!! and a secondary Gabutyra Fang for dual wielding through the Double (ダブル, Daburu) Zyudenchi during the film Zyuden Sentai Kyoryuger: Gaburincho of Music.

When Gabutyra becomes Minityra and assumes its firearm-like Gabutyra de Carnival (ガブティラ・デ・カーニバル, Gabutira De Kānibaru) mode, Daigo can use it to transform into the stronger Kyoryu Red Carnival (キョウリュウレッドカーニバル, Kyōryū Reddo Kānibaru). The Gabutyra de Carnival can also combine with the Gaburivolver to form the Gaburi Carnival (ガブリカーニバル, Gaburi Kānibaru) cannon. Through the process of Snapping Changes (カミツキチェンジ, Kamitsuki Chenji), Daigo can borrow his allies' Zyudenchi and channel the power of the Kyoryugers' giant robot, Kyoryuzin, to assume the following forms:

- Kyoryu Red Samba Carnival (キョウリュウレッドサンバカーニバル, Kyōryū Reddo Sanba Kānibaru): An auxiliary form accessed from the Stegotchi, Dricera, and Gabutyra Zyudenchi that equips Daigo with the Stegotchi Shield and Dricera Drill.
  - Kyoryu Red Samba Carnival Special (キョウリュウレッドサンバカーニバルスペシャル, Kyōryū Reddo Sanba Kānibaru Supesharu): A variant of Kyoryu Red Samba Carnival accessed from the Stegotchi, Tobaspino, and Gabutyra Zyudenchi that solely equips Daigo with the Stegotchi Shield. In this form, he wields the Spino Boomerang and Spino Defenser.
- Kyoryu Red Macho Carnival (キョウリュウレッドマッチョカーニバル, Kyōryū Reddo Matcho Kānibaru): An auxiliary form accessed from the Ankydon, Dricera, and Gabutyra Zyudenchi that equips Daigo with the Ankydon Hammer and Dricera Drill.
- Kyoryu Red Kung-Fu Carnival (キョウリュウレッドカンフーカーニバル, Kyōryū Reddo Kanfū Kānibaru): An auxiliary form accessed from the Ankydon, Bunpachy, and Gabutyra Zyudenchi that equips Daigo with the Ankydon Hammer and Bunpachy Ball.
- Kyoryu Red Western Carnival (キョウリュウレッドウエスタンカーニバル, Kyōryū Reddo Uesutan Kānibaru): An auxiliary form accessed from the Parasagun, Zakutor, and Gabutyra Zyudenchi that equips Daigo with the Parasa Beam Gun and Zakutor Sword.

During the events of the V-Cinema Ohsama Sentai King-Ohger vs. Kyoryuger, Minityra transforms into a variant of the Gaburivolver called the Gabutyvolver (ガブティボルバー, Gabutiborubā), which allows Daigo to transform into Gabutyra Kyoryu Red (ガブティラキョウリュウレッド, Gabutira Kyōryū Reddo). While transformed, he wields a variant of the Gaburicalibur called the King Gaburicalibur (キングガブリカリバー, Kingu Gaburikaribā), which can combine with the Gabutyvolver to form the King Gaburu Cannon (キングガブルキャノン, Kingu Gaburu Kyanon) shotgun. He can also use the Quetzalcross and Mosasawrus Zyudenchi to assume an auxiliary form known as Gabutyra Kyoryu Red Anniversary Carnival (ガブティラキョウリュウレッドアニバーサリーカーニバル, Gabutira Kyōryū Reddo Anibāsarī Kānibaru).

Daigo Kiryu is portrayed by Ryo Ryusei (竜星 涼, Ryūsei Ryō). As a child, Daigo is portrayed by Itsuki Shibuya (渋谷 樹生, Shibuya Itsuki).

==== Ian Yorkland ====
Ian Yorkland (イアン・ヨークランド, Ian Yōkurando) is a cheerful casanova and former archaeologist whose bright personality and dry wit hides a tragic past. During the Deboth Army's initial attack, he lost his best friend and fellow treasure hunter, Shiro Mifune, to Aigallon. After surviving the ordeal, Ian was found by Torin and defeated Parasagun to become the "Bullet Brave" (弾丸の勇者, Dangan no Yūsha), Kyoryu Black (キョウリュウブラック, Kyōryū Burakku). He originally distances himself from the other Kyoryugers until Daigo helps him overcome the trauma he suffered from Shiro's death and become friends with his teammates. As the Kyoryugers' smartest member, Ian is a diligent and skilled tactician who helps lead the team whenever Daigo is unavailable.

As Kyoryu Black, Ian wields the Parasa Shot (パラサショット, Parasa Shotto) raygun.

Ian Yorkland is portrayed by Syuusuke Saito (斉藤 秀翼, Saitō Shūsuke).

==== Nobuharu Udo ====
Nobuharu Udo (有働 ノブハル, Udō Nobuharu) is a hardworking and optimistic handyman with incredible strength who defeated Stegotchi and became the "Armored Brave" (鎧の勇者, Yoroi no Yūsha), Kyoryu Blue (キョウリュウブルー, Kyōryū Burū). Previously a salaryman, he moved in with his sister, Yuko Fukui, and his niece, Rika, after the untimely death of Yuko's husband Kenichi, and took over operations for Kenichi's shop, Jack-of-All-Trades Marufuku (なんでもや まるふく, Nandemoya Marufuku). Due to his being the oldest member of the team and penchant for using oyaji gags, outdated and unfunny puns which Kenichi enjoyed, Canderrilla finds amusing, and others find annoying, Nobuharu's peers have taken to calling him "Nossan" (ノッさん), (Note: "Ossan" (おっさん) is a Japanese term of friendly endearment for older men, best translated into English as "Pops".) much to his dismay. Originally, he is reluctant to fight for fear that his family will get caught in the crossfire. However, Daigo convinces Nobuharu that his family is a source of strength and motivation rather than a weakness. It is later revealed in Ohsama Sentai King-Ohger that Nobuharu had started a relationship with Canderrilla and they got engaged.

As Kyoryu Blue, Nobuharu wields the Stego Shield (ステゴシールド, Sutego Shīrudo). He also often uses sumo kiai and pro wrestling moves in battle.

Nobuharu Udo is portrayed by Yamato Kinjo (金城 大和, Kinjō Yamato).

==== Souji Rippukan ====
Souji Rippukan (立風館 ソウジ, Rippūkan Sōji) is a cool-headed student of Kirisaki Private High School (私立霧咲高等学校, Shiritsu Kirisaki Kōtō Gakkō), the youngest member of the Kyoryugers, and member of the Rippukan House (立風館家, Rippūkan-ke), a family of swordsmen who have been practicing the Musōken (無双剣, "Peerless Sword") assassination kenjutsu since the Sengoku period. Despite his formidable skill as a swordsman and respect for his father Genryu's hope that he will carry on the family legacy, Souji is unsure of what he wants to do with his life and resents his father for neglecting his mother. As an act of defiance against him, Souji defeated Zakutor to become the "Slashing Brave" (斬撃の勇者, Zangeki no Yūsha), Kyoryu Green (キョウリュウグリーン, Kyōryū Gurīn), and developed a feral sword-fighting style, which would later become his personal kenjutsu, the "Slashing Peerless Sword" (斬撃無双剣, Zangeki Musōken). Initially distant from the other Kyoryugers, Souji eventually joins the team when Daigo helps resolve his issues with Genryu.

During the events of the V-Cinema Zyuden Sentai Kyoryuger Returns: Hundred Years After, Souji lives to become 116 by the year 2114 due to life-expectancy improving in the intervening years and becomes his great-grandson Soujirou's mentor before helping him and his friends Icchan and Uppie become part of the new Kyoryugers.

As Kyoryu Green, Souji wields the Zakutor Slasher (ザクトルスラッシャー, Zakutoru Surasshā) claw. He later inherits Torin's Feather Edge near the end of the series and would later pass on said weapon to Soujirou in the future.

Souji Rippukan is portrayed by Akihisa Shiono (塩野 瑛久, Shiono Akihisa). As a child, Souji is portrayed by Ayumu Yamada (山田 あゆむ, Yamada Ayumu).

==== Amy Yuuzuki ====
Amy Yuuzuki (アミィ結月, Amyi Yūzuki) is a headstrong college student from a wealthy family who defeated Dricera while living in the United States and became the "Horned Brave" (角の勇者, Tsuno no Yūsha), Kyoryu Pink (キョウリュウピンク, Kyōryū Pinku). Though she has a personal butler named Gentle who attends to her needs, Amy works as a part-time waitress at the Tiger Boy family restaurant and makes no effort to hide her personality despite Gentle's efforts to help her behave like an elegant lady until he eventually comes to understand her true nature. After being captured by the Deboth Army, Souji learns Amy acquired the ability to use her feet like a second pair of hands, a skill ironically obtained due to laziness instead of hard work. When the Woorushades join the team, Amy struggles with the possibility that she has feelings for Daigo until she discovers he reciprocates those feelings during their final battle with Deboth himself. In Ohsama Sentai King-Ohger, Amy discovers that she will eventually marry Daigo when she meets their time-displaced future son, Daigoro Kiryu (桐生 ダイゴロウ, Kiryū Daigorō), nicknamed "Prince" (プリンス, Purinsu).

As Kyoryu Pink, Amy wields the DriceLance (ドリケランス, Dorikeransu) drill.

Amy Yuuzuki is portrayed by Ayuri Konno (今野 鮎莉, Konno Ayuri).

==== Utsusemimaru ====
Utsusemimaru (空蝉丸), nicknamed Utchy (ウッチー, Utchī) by Amy, is a samurai from the Sengoku period who defeated Pteragordon, became the "Thundering Brave" (雷鳴の勇者, Raimei no Yūsha), Kyoryu Gold (キョウリュウゴールド, Kyōryū Gōrudo), and a practitioner of the Lightning Sword (雷電剣, Raidenken) kenjutsu. He previously served under and fought alongside Lord Iwaizumi Mōshinosuke against the Deboth Army until Deboth Army members Kaos and Dogold formulated a scheme to enrage Utsusemimaru and gain control of Pteragordon. Once the samurai had fallen into their trap, he was sealed within Dogold's body for centuries. While Utsusemimaru was presumed dead, the modern day Kyoryugers eventually discover what happened and free him from Dogold. Despite this, he initially puts on an air of arrogance and distances himself from them as his late lord believed kindness was a sign of weakness. After Amy and Daigo discover his humble and considerate personality, Utsusemimaru drops the facade and joins the Kyoryugers. Amidst their battles with the Deboth Army, the samurai develops a rivalry with Dogold until the latter falls under Endolf's control. Utsusemimaru eventually frees his rival and joins him in destroying Endolf before giving Dogold an honorable death. The samurai also falls in the battle, but he is revived by the power of the True Melody of the Earth. Following Deboth's destruction, Utsusemimaru adopts the Iwaizumi (岩泉) surname for himself out of respect for his deceased Lord.

Unlike the primary Kyoryugers, Utsusemimaru utilizes the bladed crossbow-like Gaburi Changer (ガブリチェンジャー, Gaburi Chenjā) gauntlet to transform into Kyoryu Gold. He also wields the Zandar Thunder (ザンダーサンダー, Zandā Sandā) sword. During the events of the DVD Special Zyuden Sentai Kyoryuger: It's Here! Armed On Midsummer Festival!!, he acquires the Pteragordon Spirit Ranger Gold Version (プテラゴードン スピリットレンジャーゴールドバージョン, Puteragodon Supiritto Renjā Gōrudo Bājon) Zyudenchi, which allows him to summon an upgraded version of the Zandar Thunder called the Golder Zandar Thunder (ゴールダーザンダーサンダー, Gōrudā Zandā Sandā).

Utsusemimaru is portrayed by Atsushi Maruyama (丸山 敦史, Maruyama Atsushi).

==== Zyudenryu ====
The Zyudenryu (獣電竜, Jūdenryū; Electric Beastosaur) are sentient dinosaur-themed mecha given power by Torin to fight the Deboth Army during their first invasion. After defeating them the first time, the Zyudenryu entered hibernation in various parts of the world until they are reawakened in the modern day when the Deboth Army returns and gain Kyoryuger partners. When a Zyudenchi is used, the Kyoryu Spirit within it allows the Zyudenryu to assume a more powerful Battle Mode (バトルモード, Batoru Mōdo), which increases their combat capability and grants them the ability to combine with other Zyudenryu via Snapping Combination (カミツキ合体, Kamitsuki Gattai) to battle enlarged Debo Monsters.

- 00. Zyudenryu Tobaspino (獣電竜トバスピノ, Jūdenryū Tobasupino): Deathryuger/Kyoryu Navy's personal Spinosaurus-themed Zyudenryu that was the first Zyudenryu to manifest in the ancient battle against the Deboth Army. While Tobaspino fell under D's enchantment and was forced to attack its allies, an ancient priestess' singing gave it the will to resist D's control and defeat him. Following this, Tobaspino entered a deep sleep until the events of the film Zyuden Sentai Kyoryuger: Gaburincho of Music where D awakens it after putting the priestess' descendant Mikoto Amano under his spell. Tobaspino almost destroys the world before the Kyoryugers purify it. Ever since, Tobaspino became a permanent ally of theirs. Upon entering Battle Mode, a boomerang emerges from Tobaspino's sail.
- 1. Zyudenryu Gabutyra (獣電竜ガブティラ, Jūdenryū Gabutira): Kyoryu Red's personal Tyrannosaurus-themed Zyudenryu that normally resides in a volcanic island in the south seas until he is summoned. Upon entering Battle Mode, Gabutyra's crest raises and he can harness the power of other Zyudenchi. Despite becoming Daigo's partner, Gabutyra is initially reluctant to place him in harm's way before Daigo convinces the Zyudenryu to let him fight by his side. Utilizing the Carnival (カーニバル, Kānibaru) Zyudenchi, Gabutyra can shrink down to a palm-sized Overcharge Mode (オーバーチャージモード, Ōbāchāji Mōdo) nicknamed "Minityra" (ミニティラ, Minitira). During the events of the crossover film Zyuden Sentai Kyoryuger vs. Go-Busters: The Great Dinosaur Battle! Farewell Our Eternal Friends, Gabutyra's past self uses the power of Dino Hope (ダイノホープ, Daino Hōpu) to communicate with his future partner so they can stop Voldos. In the film Heisei Riders vs. Shōwa Riders: Kamen Rider Taisen feat. Super Sentai, Gabutyra gains the ability to transform into the Kyoryuger Ressha (キョウリュウジャーレッシャー, Kyōryūjā Resshā). Gabutyra's past self is voiced by Kōichi Yamadera (山寺 宏一, Yamadera Kōichi).
- 2. Zyudenryu Parasagun (パラサガン, Jūdenryū Parasagan): Kyoryu Black's personal Parasaurolophus-themed Zyudenryu that normally resides in an old European castle until it is summoned. Upon entering Battle Mode, Parasagun's tail becomes a rifle. When used in a Zyudenryu combination, Parasagun becomes the right forearm-mounted Parasa Beam Gun (パラサビームガン, Parasa Bīmu Gan). If Parasagun combines with Zakutor, they create a Western (ウエスタン, Uesutan) formation.
- 3. Zyudenryu Stegotchi (獣電竜ステゴッチ, Jūdenryū Sutegotchi): Kyoryu Blue's personal Stegosaurus-themed Zyudenryu that normally resides in the North Pole until it is summoned. Upon entering Battle Mode, a blade grows from Stegotchi's back. When used in a Zyudenryu combination, Stegotchi becomes the right forearm-mounted Stegotchi Shield (ステゴッチシールド, Sutegotchi Shīrudo).
- 4. Zyudenryu Zakutor (獣電竜ザクトル, Jūdenryū Zakutoru): Kyoryu Green's personal Velociraptor-themed Zyudenryu that normally resides in a bamboo thicket in Japan's mountains until it is summoned. Upon entering Battle Mode, Zakutor's tail becomes a claw. When used in a Zyudenryu combination, Zakutor becomes the left forearm-mounted Zakutor Sword (ザクトルソード, Zakutoru Sōdo). If Zakutor combines with Parasagun, they create a Western formation.
- 5. Zyudenryu Dricera (獣電竜ドリケラ, Jūdenryū Dorikera): Kyoryu Pink's personal Triceratops-themed Zyudenryu that normally resides near the Grand Canyon in the United States until it is summoned. Upon entering Battle Mode, Dricera's tail becomes a drill. When used in a Zyudenryu combination, Dricera becomes the left forearm-mounted Dricera Drill (ドリケラドリル, Dorikera Doriru). If Dricera combines with Ankydon, they create a Macho (マッチョ, Matcho) formation.
- 6. Zyudenryu Pteragordon (獣電竜プテラゴードン, Jūdenryū Puteragōdon): Kyoryu Gold's personal Pteranodon-themed Zyudenryu that normally resides in dark clouds until it is summoned. It became Utsusemimaru's partner during the Sengoku period, but sustained damage after its partner fell under Dogold's control. While healing in Gabutyra's volcano, Kaos releases Pteragordon to serve the Deboth Army until Utsusemimaru is freed from Dogold and allows it fight by its fellow Zyudenryu's side once more. While assuming Battle Mode, Pteragordon can emit lightning bolts.
- 7. Zyudenryu Ankydon (獣電竜アンキドン, Jūdenryū Ankidon): Kyoryu Cyan's personal Ankylosaurus-themed Zyudenryu that normally resides underground until it is summoned. Originally forming a pact with Ramirez in the Middle Ages, Ankydon battled Debo Viruson before it was possessed by the Zetsumate. In the present, Amy eventually tricks Debo Viruson out of the Zyudenryu. Upon entering Battle Mode, Ankydon's tail becomes a war hammer. When used in a Zyudenryu formation, Ankydon becomes the right forearm-mounted Ankydon Hammer (アンキドンハンマー, Ankidon Hanmā). If Ankydon combines with either Dricera or Bunpachy, they create a Macho formation and a Kung-Fu (カンフー, Kanfū) formation respectively.
- 8. Zyudenryu Bunpachy (獣電竜ブンパッキー, Jūdenryū Bunpakkī): Kyoryu Gray's personal Pachycephalosaurus-themed Zyudenryu that normally resides behind the Mannen Falls (万年滝, Man'nen-daki) in China until it is summoned. Bunpachy became Tessai's partner fifteen centuries prior and spent the intervening years in spiritual meditation until the modern day Kyoryugers require its aid. Upon entering Battle Mode, Bunpachy's forehead separates and turns its tail into a morning star. When used in a Zyudenryu formation, Bunpachy becomes the left forearm-mounted Bunpachy Ball (ブンパッキーボール, Bunpakkī Bōru). If Bunpachy combines with Ankydon, they create a Kung-Fu formation.
- 9. Zyudenryu Plezuon (獣電竜プレズオン, Jūdenryū Purezuon): Kyoryu Violet's personal Plesiosaurus-themed Zyudenryu that normally resides in the Plezuon Lab's dock until it is summoned. Originally a purely aquatic Zyudenryu, Doctor Woorushade granted Plezuon the ability to travel through space. Upon switching from Rocket Mode (ロケットモード, Roketto Mōdo) to Battle Mode, Plezuon's wings unfold to enable it to travel through outer space. With Doctor Woorushade's granddaughter Yayoi's help, Plezuon is upgraded with the Deboth Cell Destruction Program (デーボス細胞破壊プログラム, Dēbosu Saibō Hakai Puroguramu) to increase its effectiveness against Debo Monsters.
- 10. Zyudenryu Bragigas (獣電竜ブラギガス, Jūdenryū Buragigasu): Kyoryu Silver's personal Brachiosaurus-themed Zyudenryu, as well as the largest and most powerful Zyudenryu, that fought alongside Torin during the original fight with Deboth. After using its unstable Gigant Cannon (ギガント砲, Giganto Hō) to defeat Deboth, Bragigas was dragged underground and drastically weakened until the Kyoryugers find the Lost Stones and revive it. Following this, Bragigas reabsorbs the Spirit Base and resides near the Earth's core until it is needed. Unlike most of the other Zyudenryu, Bragigas can use the Guardians' Zyudenchi alongside its own to access their powers while assuming Battle Mode.

===== Guardians =====
The Guardians (ガーディアンズ, Gādianzu) are lesser Zyudenryu who took part in the original fight against the Deboth Army. Despite being killed in battle, Bragigas' tears fossilized the Guardians into the Lost Stones, which were scattered across the Earth until the Kyoryugers recover and use them to revive Bragigas. The Guardians' Zyudenchi are primarily used by the Kyoryugers and the Zyudenryu for various attacks, though Bragigas can use all their abilities at once.

- 11. Deinochaser (ディノチェイサー, Dinocheisā): The Zyudenchi of a Deinonychus-based Zyudenryu that summons the eponymous motorcycle.
- 12. Deinosgrander (ディノスグランダー, Dinosugurandā): The Zyudenchi of a Deinosuchus-based Zyudenryu that clads the user in the eponymous armor.
- 13. Kentrospiker (ケントロスパイカー, Kentorosupaikā): The Zyudenchi of a Kentrosaurus-based Zyudenryu that allows the primary Kyoryugers to combine their Zyuden Arms into the eponymous javelin composed of the Fang Shot (ファングショット, Fangu Shotto), Kyoryu Red and Black's combined weapons, and the Shield Lan Slasher (シールドランスラッシャー, Shīrudo Ran Surasshā), Kyoryu Blue, Green, and Pink's combined weapons. During the events of the crossover film Zyuden Sentai Kyoryuger vs. Go-Busters: The Great Dinosaur Battle! Farewell Our Eternal Friends, the Kyoryugers combine their Kentrospiker, the Zyurangers' Howling Cannon, and the Abarangers' Dino Bomber to form the Ultimate Howling Cannon (アルティメットハウリングキャノン, Arutimetto Hauringu Kyanon).
- 14. Stymero (スティメロ, Sutimero): The Zyudenchi of a Styracosaurus-based Zyudenryu that induces infatuation in targets.
- 15. Allomerus (アロメラス, Aromerasu): The Zyudenchi of an Allosaurus-based Zyudenryu that emits scorching flames.
- 16. Beyonsmo (ビヨンスモ, Biyonsumo): The Zyudenchi of a Diplodocus-based Zyudenryu that allows the user to extend anything.
- 17. Ovirappoo (オビラップー, Obirappū): The Zyudenchi of an Oviraptor-based Zyudenryu that emits a foul-smelling smoke screen.
- 18. Igeranodon (イゲラノドン): The Zyudenchi of an Iguanodon-based Zyudenryu that induces a tickling sensation in targets.
- 19. Tuperanda (トペランダ, Toperanda): The Zyudenchi of a Tapejara-based Zyudenryu that allows the user to flatten anything.
- 20. Gurumonite (グルモナイト, Gurumonaito): The Zyudenchi of an Ammonite-based Zyudenryu that induces dizziness in targets.
- 21. Archenolon (アーケノロン, Ākenoron): The Zyudenchi of an Archelon-based Zyudenryu that emits a gravity field.
- 22. Pukuptor (プクプトル, Pukuputoru): The Zyudenchi of a Fukuiraptor-based Zyudenryu that allows the user to inflate anything.
- 23. Futabain (フタバイン): The Zyudenchi of a Futabasaurus-based Zyudenryu that allows the user to duplicate anything.
- 24. Quetzalcross (ケツァルクロス, Ketsuarukurosu): The Zyudenchi of a Quetzalcoatlus-based Zyudenryu that equips the user with the right forearm-mounted Quetzal Bowgun (ケツァルボウガン, Ketsuaru Bōgan). This Zyudenchi appears exclusively in the V-Cinema Ohsama Sentai King-Ohger vs. Kyoryuger.
- 25. Mosasawrus (モサソールス, Mosasōrusu): The Zyudenchi of a Mosasaurus-based Zyudenryu that equips the user with the left forearm-mounted Mosasawrus Chainsaw (モサソールスチェーンソー, Mosasōrusu Chēnsō). This Zyudenchi appears exclusively in the V-Cinema Ohsama Sentai King-Ohger vs. Kyoryuger.

===== Zyuden Giants =====
The Zyuden Giants (獣電巨人, Jūden Kyojin) are giant robots composed of/transformed from the Zyudenryu, which the Kyoryugers pilot through motion capture, that are capable of performing their own self-titled Brave Finish (ブレイブフィニッシュ, Bureibu Finisshu) finishers. In battle, a Zyuden Giant can also arm/exchange their limbs with another Zyudenryu for additional strength.

- Kyoryuzin (キョウリュウジン, Kyōryūjin): The Kyoryugers' first Zyuden Giant composed of Zyudenryu Gabutyra, Stegotchi, and Dricera. If all five primary members join in the cockpit, the Stegotchi Shield transforms into the Goren Zyudenken (五連獣電剣, Goren Jūdenken; Five-Consecutive Electric Beast Sword), which allows Kyoryuzin to perform the Zyudenken: Brave Finish (獣電剣・ブレイブフィニッシュ, Jūdenken Bureibu Finisshu) finisher.
  - Kyoryuzin Western (キョウリュウジンウエスタン, Kyōryūjin Uesutan): A combination of Zyudenryu Gabutyra, Parasagun, and Zakutor.
  - Kyoryuzin Macho (キョウリュウジンマッチョ, Kyōryūjin Matcho): A combination of Zyudenryu Gabutyra, Ankydon, and Dricera.
  - Raiden Kyoryuzin (ライデンキョウリュウジン, Raiden Kyōryūjin): The Lightning Snapping Combination (雷電カミツキ合体, Raiden Kamitsuki Gattai) of Kyoryuzin and Zyudenryu Pteragordon that grants a pair of Ptera Wings (プテラウィング, Putera Uingu). Its finisher is the Zyuden Sword: Lightning Brave Finish (獣電剣・稲妻ブレイブフィニッシュ, Jūden Ken Inazuma Bureibu Finisshu).
    - Tategami Raiden Kyoryuzin (タテガミライデンキョウリュウジン, Tategami Raiden Kyōryūjin): A combination of Raiden Kyoryuzin and the Go-Busters' giant robot Tategami LiOh that grants the use of the latter's Tategami Shield (タテガミシールド, Tategami Shīrudo). Its finisher is the Zyuden Attack: Legendary Brave Finish (獣電撃・伝説ブレイブフィニッシュ, Jūdengeki Densetsu Bureibu Finisshu), which is performed alongside the Zyurangers and Abarangers' respective giant robots Daizyuzin and AbarenOh. This combination appears exclusively in the crossover film Zyuden Sentai Kyoryuger vs. Go-Busters: The Great Dinosaur Battle! Farewell Our Eternal Friends.
  - Kyoryuzin Kung-Fu (キョウリュウジンカンフー, Kyōryūjin Kanfū): A combination of Zyudenryu Gabutyra, Ankydon, and Bunpachy.
  - Bakuretsu Kyoryuzin (バクレツキョウリュウジン, Bakuretsu Kyōryūjin): The Explosive Snapping Combination (爆裂カミツキ合体, Bakuretsu Kamitsuki Gattai) of Zyudenryu Gabutyra, Bunpachy, and Plezuon that can paralyze Deboth cells via its Zyuden Explosive Storm (獣電爆裂ストーム, Jūden Bakuretsu Sutōmu) attack. Its finisher is the Zyuden Cannon: Explosive Brave Finish (獣電砲・爆裂ブレイブフィニッシュ, Jūden-hō Bakuretsu Bureibu Finisshu).
  - Kyoryuzin Baseball (キョウリュウジンベースボール, Kyōryūjin Bēsubōru): A variation of Kyoryuzin that wields the Zyuden Bat (獣電バット, Jūden Batto), which allows it to perform the Kyoryuzin: Big Spinning Swing (キョウリュウジン・大回転打法, Kyōryūjin Daikaiten Dahō) attack.
  - Gigant Kyoryuzin (ギガントキョウリュウジン, Giganto Kyōryūjin): The Super Snapping Combination (超カミツキ合体, Chō Kamitsuki Gattai) of Kyoryuzin and Zyudenryu Parasagun, Zakutor, and Bragigas that wields the Bragio Zakutor Axe (ブラギオザクトルアックス, Buragio Zakutoru Akkusu). With the help of Yayoi, Bragigas' Gigant Cannon is modified into a safer variant called the Gigant Formation (ギガントフォーメーション, Giganto Fōmēshon) so the giant robot can perform the Super Zyuden All Gigant Explosion (超獣電オールギガントエクスプロージョン, Chō Jūden Ōru Giganto Ekusupurōjon) finisher.
  - Kyoryuzin Christmas (キョウリュウジンクリスマス, Kyōryūjin Kurisumasu): A variation of Kyoryuzin that wears a Santa Claus hat.
  - Kyoryuzin Kick Strike (キョウリュウジンキックストライク, Kyōryūjin Kikku Sutoraiku): The Miracle Combination (ミラクル合体, Mirakuru Gattai) of Kyoryuzin and Kamen Rider Wizard's enlarged inner Phantom WizarDragon that harnesses the power of past Tyrannosaurus-themed Sentai mecha (Guardian Beast Tyrannosaurus, the V-Rex, Bakuryū Tyrannosaurus, Engine Tyrain, the Kyoryu Origami, the Tyranno Headder, and GouZyu Rex). Its finisher is the Zyuden Brave Strike End (獣電ブレイブストライクエンド, Jūden Bureibu Sutoraiku Endo). This combination appears exclusively in the crossover film Kamen Rider × Super Sentai × Space Sheriff: Super Hero Taisen Z.
  - King Kyoryuzin (キングキョウリュウジン, Kingu Kyōryūjin): The Ohsama Combination (王様合体, Ōsama Gattai) of Zyudenryu Gabutyra and Gods Tombo, Kamakiri, Papillon, and Hachi that wields the Shugod Sword (シュゴッドソード, Shugoddo Sōdo). Its finisher is the Kyoryu & Shugod Brave Finish (キョウリュウ&シュゴッドブレイブフィニッシュ, Kyōryū Ando Shugoddo Bureibu Finisshu). This combination appears exclusively in Ohsama Sentai King-Ohger.
- PteraidenOh (プテライデンオー, Puteraidenō): The Lightning Transformation (カミナリ変形, Kaminari Henkei) of Zyudenryu Pteragordon and Kyoryu Gold's personal Zyuden Giant that is equipped with the twin forearm-mounted Ptera Cutter (プテラカッター, Putera Kattā) blades and the chest-mounted Ptera Head (プテラヘッド, Putera Heddo) cannon. Under Dogold's influence, the brainwashed Zyuden Giant wears a bulletproof cape.
  - PteraidenOh Western (プテライデンオーウエスタン, Puteraidenō Uesutan): A combination of Zyudenryu Parasagun, Zakutor, and Pteragordon.
  - PteraidenOh Christmas (プテライデンオークリスマス, Puteraidenō Kurisumasu): A variation of PteraidenOh that wears a Santa Claus hat.
- PlezuOh (プレズオー, Purezuō): The Rocket Transformation (ロケット変形, Roketto Henkei) of Zyudenryu Plezuon and Kyoryu Violet's personal Zyuden Giant that is equipped with the right forearm-mounted Plezu Cannon (プレズキャノン, Purezu Kyanon) and can fire its left-handed Plezu Knuckle (プレズナックル, Purezu Nakkuru) fist like a missile. While strong and sluggish in terrestrial environments, PlezuOh becomes fast and agile in space through the use of its boosters.
- Gigant BragiOh (ギガントブラギオー, Giganto Buragiō): The Super Snapping Transformation (超カミツキ変形, Chō Kamitsuki Henkei) of Zyudenryu Bragigas and Kyoryu Silver's personal Zyuden Giant that wields the Bragio Axe (ブラギオアックス, Buragio Akkusu).
- SpinoDaiOh (スピノダイオー, Supinodaiō): The Kyoryugers' second Zyuden Giant composed of Zyudenryu Tobaspino, Ankydon, and Bunpachy that wields the Spino Boomerang (スピノブーメラン, Supino Būmeran), which allows it to perform the Boomerang Finish (ブーメランフィニッシュ, Būmeran Finisshu) finisher, and the Spino Defenser (スピノディフェンサー, Supino Difensā) shield. D originally forced this combination into being via Forced Snapping Combination (強制カミツキ合体, Kyosei Kamitsuki Gattai) to perform the Super Destructive Light Bullet (超破滅光弾, Chō Hametsu Kōdan) attack until the Kyoryugers free Tobaspino from his influence. This combination first appears in the film Zyuden Sentai Kyoryuger: Gaburincho of Music.
  - SpinoDaiOh Western (スピノダイオーウエスタン, Supinodaiō Uesutan): A combination of Zyudenryu Tobaspino, Parasagun, and Zakutor.

=== Kyoryuger Brave ===
The Kyoryuger Brave are the protagonists of the Korean-exclusive sequel series Zyuden Sentai Kyoryuger Brave. Consisting of South Korean residents, Torin assembles the team in the wake of the Neo-Deboth Army's attack. The primary members utilize a new set of Zyudenchi that correspond to their respective Zyudenryu in conjunction with the Gabu Gaburivolver (ガブガブリボルバー, Gabu Gaburiborubā) firearm to transform. They also each carry a Gabu Gaburicalibur (ガブガブリカリバー, Gabu Gaburikaribā) sword, which can combine with the Gabu Gaburivolver to form the Gabugabu Cannon (ガブガブキャノン, Gabugabu Kyanon) shotgun.

==== Kwon Juyong ====
Kwon Juyong (クォン・ジュヨン, Kwon Juyon) is the "child of the 'saur" (竜の子, Ryū no Ko) who trained himself in the mountains from a young age and searches for his long lost older brother. During the Neo-Deboth Army's attack, Torin gives him the ability to become Brave Kyoryu Red (ブレイブキョウリュウレッド, Bureibu Kyōryū Reddo) after seeing the original Kyoryu Red, Daigo Kiryu, in him. Kwon is a bright and reliable leader who smiles when facing challenges. He is later revealed to be the true successor of the Power of the 'Saur King.

Kwon Juyong is portrayed by Kim Se-yong and voiced by Yūtarō Honjō (本城 雄太郎, Honjō Yūtarō) in the Japanese dub. As a child, Juyong is portrayed by Rui Takahashi (高橋 琉晟, Takahashi Rui).

==== Jeon Hyeonjun ====
Jeon Hyeonjun (チョン・ヒュンジュン, Chon Hyunjun) is a police officer with superhuman strength who gains the ability to become Brave Kyoryu Black (ブレイブキョウリュウブラック, Bureibu Kyōryū Burakku). Despite his adherence for rules, he is quite friendly to others.

Jeon Hyeonjun is portrayed by Hong Sung-ho of Apeace and voiced by Yamato Kinjo in the Japanese dub.

==== Kim Sechang ====
Kim Sechang (キム・セチャン, Kimu Sechan) is a member of the idol group Super Boys (スーパーボーイズ, Sūpā Bōizu) who gains the ability to become Brave Kyoryu Blue (ブレイブキョウリュウブルー, Bureibu Kyōryū Burū). Befitting of his career, he retains his elegance while fighting.

Kim Sechang is portrayed by Oh Se-hyeon of Apeace and voiced by Yasunao Sakai (坂井 易直, Sakai Yasunao) in the Japanese dub.

==== Lee Pureun ====
Lee Pureun (イ・プルン, I Purun) is a millionaire noble who gains the ability to become Brave Kyoryu Green (ブレイブキョウリュウグリーン, Bureibu Kyōryū Gurīn). While he is a spoiled individual, he demonstrates tremendous skill in gunfights.

Lee Pureun is portrayed by Injun of The Boss and voiced by Daiki Kobayashi (小林 大紀, Kobayashi Daiki) in the Japanese dub.

==== Yun Dohee ====
Yun Dohee (ユン・ドヒ, Yun Dohi) is an aspiring nurse who gains the ability to become Brave Kyoryu Pink (ブレイブキョウリュウピンク, Bureibu Kyōryū Pinku). She is excellent in fast attacks.

Yun Dohee is portrayed by Lee Yu-jin and voiced by Kanae Oki (沖 佳苗, Oki Kanae) in the Japanese dub.

==== Juhyeok ====
Juhyeok (ジュヒョク, Juhyoku) is Juyong's older brother who became a space mercenary. Like the original Kyoryu Gold, he utilizes the crossbow-like Gabugabu Changer (ガブガブチェンジャー, Gabugabu Chenjā) gauntlet to transform into Brave Kyoryu Gold (ブレイブキョウリュウゴールド, Bureibu Kyōryū Gōrudo) and wields the Zandar Thunder. After being hired by the Neo-Deboth Army, he pretends to be the successor of the Power of the 'Saur King until Juyong's power is awakened. After his contract with the Neo-Deboth Army is nullified, Juhyeok joins forces with the Kyoryuger Brave to continue serving as Juyong's decoy.

Juhyeok is portrayed by Lee Se-young of Cross Gene and voiced by Shouma Yamamoto (山本 匠馬, Yamamoto Shōma) in the Japanese dub. As a child, Juhyeok is portrayed by Ryu Hashizume (橋爪 龍, Hashizume Ryū).

==== Zyudenryu ====
- 1. Guntyra (ガンティラ, Gantira): Brave Kyoryu Red's personal Tyrannosaurus-themed Zyudenryu, based on Gabutyra, which possess a forehead-mounted Gatling gun. Like its predecessor, Guntyra serves as the core of the Zyudenryu's combinations, forming either Brave Kyoryuzin (ブレイブキョウリュウジン, Bureibu Kyōryūjin) with Stegonsaw and Shovecera or Brave Kyoryuzin Western (ブレイブキョウリュウジンウエスタン, Bureibu Kyōryūjin Uesutan) with Parasaser and Rapx.
- 2. Stegonsaw (ステゴンソー, Sutegonsō): Brave Kyoryu Black's personal Stegosaurus-themed Zyudenryu, based on Stegotchi. Upon entering Battle Mode, Stegonsaw produces a large chainsaw from its back, which becomes a sword for Brave Kyoryuzin to wield.
- 3. Shovecera (ショベケラ, Shobekera): Brave Kyoryu Blue's personal Triceratops-themed Zyudenryu, based on Dricera. Upon entering Battle Mode, Shovecera's front horns become a large shovel.
- 4. Parasaser (パラサーザー, Parasāzā): Brave Kyoryu Green's personal Parasaurolophus-themed Zyudenryu, based on Parasagun. Upon entering Battle Mode, Parasaser's tail becomes a rifle. Unlike its predecessor, Parasaser is equipped with a mouth cannon.
- 5. Rapx (ラプックス, Rapukkusu): Brave Kyoryu Pink's personal Velociraptor-themed Zyudenryu, based on Zakutor. Upon entering Battle Mode, Rapx's tail becomes a labrys.
- 6. Pteravolton (プテラボルトン, Puteraboruton): Brave Kyoryu Gold's personal Pteranodon-themed Zyudenryu, based on Pteragordon. Like its predecessor, Pteravolton possesses the ability to transform into its own humanoid form called Brave PteraidenOh (ブレイブプテライデンオー, Bureibu Puteraidenō), which can combine with Brave Kyoryuzin to form Brave Raiden Kyoryuzin (ブレイブライデンキョウリュウジン, Bureibu Raiden Kyōryūjin).
- 10. Giga Bragigas (ギガブラギガス, Giga Buragigasu): A silver/purple Brachiosaurus-themed Zyudenryu, based on Bragigas. Like its predecessor, Giga Bragigas houses the Spirit Base, which also doubles as Canderrilla and Luckyulo's living space, and possesses the ability to transform into its own humanoid form called Brave Gigant BragiOh (ブレイブギガントブラギオー, Bureibu Giganto Buragiō), which can combine with Brave Kyoryuzin, Parasaser, and Rapx to form Brave Gigant Kyoryuzin (ブレイブギガントキョウリュウジン, Bureibu Giganto Kyōryūjin). It is sealed by Jinarik during the Neo-Deboth Army's arrival, but Torin manages to remove the Spirit Base at the last minute to save Canderrilla and Luckyulo. The Kyoryuger Brave and Torin are later able to free Giga Bragigas from Jinarik's control.

===== Zyudenchi =====
In a similar manner to the Guardians, the Kyoryuger Brave also utilize support Zyudenchi that provide them additional attacks.

- 24. Speedrus (スピードルス, Supīdorusu): The Zyudenchi of a Supersaurus-based Zyudenryu that grants superhuman speed.
- 25. Prisukeos (プリスケオス, Purisukeosu): The Zyudenchi of a Pliosaurus-based Zyudenryu that grants invisibility.
- 26. Fuwanycto (フワニクト, Fuwanikuto): The Zyudenchi of a Nyctosaurus-based Zyudenryu that grants flight capabilities.
- 27. Kachikox (カチコックス, Kachikokkusu): The Zyudenchi of a Dracorex-based Zyudenryu that grants the ability to turn anyone into living metal.
- 28. Karateta (カラテーター, Karatētā): The Zyudenchi of an Irritator-based Zyudenryu that induces a spicy sensation in targets.
- 29. Taekwodonto (テコドント, Tekodonto): The Zyudenchi of a Thecodontosaurus-based Zyudenryu that grants the ability to perform continuous taekwondo feats.

== Recurring characters ==
=== Deboth Army ===
The Deboth Army (デーボス軍, Dēbosu-gun) are The Wonderful Wizard of Oz-themed aliens formed from the cells of their group's namesake to aid him in invading Earth during the Mesozoic era by exterminating the planet's dominant lifeform, the dinosaurs. While they were defeated and sealed in ice by the Zyudenryu after centuries of battle, the Deboth Army slowly resurfaced over the following millennia to harvest humans' emotional energy to thaw Deboth and increase his knowledge on them so he can herald a new mass extinction. Once they fulfill their objective, Deboth creates the Darkness Clock (闇時計, Yamidokei) to count down the Earth's destruction before opening numerous portals to Deboth Hell before the final destruction occurs. However, the Deboth Army is ultimately defeated by the Kyoryugers.

==== Deboth ====
Dark Species Deboth (暗黒種デーボス, Ankokushu Dēbosu), also known as the "Planetary Illness" (星の病, Hoshi no Yamai), is an aggressive Emerald City-themed, dinosaur/plant/caterpillar-like being created by Devius for the purpose of becoming the ultimate being. To this end, Deboth traveled to numerous planets to study their dominant lifeforms, evolve into a form reflecting the target species, and leave the planet to unleash a melody that reduces it to a lifeless world. After coming to Earth however, his creation Torin betrayed him and damaged his heart while the Zyudenryu Bragigas damaged his body and sealed it in the Antarctic seabed, where it became the Frozen Castle (氷結城, Hyōketsujō), from which the Deboth Army's members are based. By the present, Deboth is partially thawed, but remains inactive as he now requires emotional energy from humans to adapt and destroy them. Eventually, Kaos grows impatient and subjects his master to a large amount of Restoration Water to forcibly resurrect Deboth, who goes on a rampage before Kaos pacifies him.

While the Kyoryugers discover their enemy is afraid of their Brave and seemingly destroy him, Deboth survives by transferring his heart to Kaos before his body is destroyed and reverts to the Frozen Castle. After gaining the emotional energy he requires, Deboth fully resurrects and briefly possesses Kaos until he can transfer his heart back to his original body and evolves into the anthropomorphic Wizard of Oz-themed Transcendenterfly God Deboth (蝶絶神デーボス, Chōzetsushin Dēbosu). (Note: Chōzetsu (蝶絶) is a Japanese portmanteau of chō (蝶, "butterfly") and chōzestu (超絶, "transcendence").) Using his newly acquired knowledge on humanity and dark melody to negate the Kyoryugers' transformation capabilities, he attempts to achieve his goal of planetary genocide until Daigo confronts and destroys him using the power of Earth's melody while the Zyudenryu destroy the Frozen Castle.

In the bestial form he assumed during the Mesozoic, Deboth possesses the Shock Tentacles (ショック触手, Shokku Shokushu) and the HoShock Jaw (捕ショックジョーズ, Hoshokku Jōzu) claws, which allows him to perform the HorobireBurst (ホロビレバースト, Horobirebāsuto) attack. While he is frozen, his stirring grants his creations increased power. In his anthropomorphic form, he wields the DeboStick (デーボステッキ, Dēbosutekki) staff, is much faster and stronger than in his previous form, can perform the Transcendenterfly Hammer (蝶絶の鉄槌, Chōzetsu no Tettsui) attack, and enlarge himself by removing his DeboStole (デーボストール, Dēbosutōru) shawl.

Deboth is voiced by Tōru Ōkawa (大川 透, Ōkawa Tōru).

==== Kaos ====
Many-Faced High Priest Kaos (百面神官カオス, Hyakumen Shinkan Kaosu) is the multi-faced Statue of Liberty/priest-themed acting leader of the Deboth Army until Deboth's resurrection and one of his oldest creations who has overseen the destruction of several planets alongside his younger brother Torin. After Torin's betrayal, Kaos vowed revenge, purposefully keeping an injury he sustained during their previous encounter as a reminder. Kaos resurfaced during Japan's Sengoku era to mastermind Utsusemimaru's capture and take control of the Zyudenryu Pteragordon before thawing out his followers in the present to revive Deboth and exterminate humanity. Despite losing Pteragordon, Kaos begins preparing for Deboth's revival before Plezuon returns to Earth. While he seemingly perishes alongside Deboth while battling Bakuretsu Kyoryuzin, Kaos becomes his master's emotional conduit and temporarily goes into hiding before returning weeks later to create Endolf, Icelond, and Killborero to accelerate Deboth's revival. Amidst his master's endgame, Kaos leads his fellow Deboth Knights into battle against the Kyoryugers before allowing himself to be destroyed so he can protect the pillar holding Deboth Hell in place. However, they are both destroyed by the Spirit Rangers, Torin's spirit, and Canderrilla.

In battle, Kaos can generate Magic Bead (呪術数珠, Jujutsu Juzu) orbs and carries the FlexiBible (フレキシバイブル, Furekishibaiburu) book. While serving as Deboth's host, his master can briefly control his body, turning him into Deboth Kaos (デーボスカオス, Dēbosu Kaosu), and allow him to perform the HorobireBurst Bullet (ホロビレバースト弾, Horobirebāsuto Dan) and Deboth Destruction (デーボスデストラクション, Dēbosu Desutorakushon) attacks.

Kaos is voiced by Takayuki Sugō (菅生 隆之, Sugō Takayuki).

==== Dogold ====
Raging Knight Dogold (怒りの戦騎ドゴルド, Ikari no Senki Dogorudo) is a foul-tempered club/Cowardly Lion/Oni/banchō-themed Deboth Knight, Kaos' second-in-command, and a living suit of armor capable of controlling anyone with a rage-filled mindset. As such, he is charged with amassing anger for Deboth. While aiding Kaos during Japan's Sengoku period, Dogold formed around Utsusemimaru's body to gain control of Pteragordon. Following his revival in the present day, he influences the amnesiac samurai to instill rage in humans until the Kyoryugers discover what happened and free their comrade while Dogold is forced to use Cambrimas as hosts. Following a failed attempt to take the G-BO (G-BO（ジーボ）, Jībo; Generation-roBOt) android as his host, Dogold undermines Endolf and uses him instead due to their similar primary emotions; gaining an increase in power in the process. As he was ordered not to kill his fellow knight, Dogold attempts to keep this secret from Kaos. However, Dogold later discovers Endolf's personality was influencing his and attempts to take Dantetsu Kiryu as his new host to maintain his sense of self, only to be betrayed by the Debo Yanasanta brothers and lose his hold over Endolf. With his rage quota filled and having lost his standing with Kaos, who knew of his transgression from the beginning, Dogold is forcibly equipped with two Deboth Cell-based rings and forced to become Endolf's bodyguard, apparently losing his sense of honor. During the Deboth Army's final battle however, Dogold regains his freedom and joins forces with Utsusemimaru to destroy Endolf. Having sustained heavy damage during the fight, Dogold forces the Kyoryuger to give him an honorable death.

In battle, Dogold can generate lightning and wields the Kenka Jōtō (喧嘩上刀; Fighting Superior Sword) Seven-Branched Sword. With Utsusemimaru as his host, Dogold can wield the Pteragordon Zyudenchi and control Pteragordon in both its Zyudenryu mode and as PteraidenOh.

Dogold is voiced by Satoshi Tsuruoka (鶴岡 聡, Tsuruoka Satoshi).

==== Aigallon ====
Sorrowful Knight Aigallon (哀しみの戦騎アイガロン, Kanashimi no Senki Aigaron) is a melancholic yet sharp and tactical spade/Tin Man/Wind-up toy-themed Deboth Knight who is charged with amassing sadness for Deboth. After being revived a year prior to the series, Aigallon donned a cloak of invincibility and traveled to Europe to steal an amber gemstone to add to his collection of jewels, murdering Shiro Mifune in order to do so and developing a rivalry with a vengeful Ian. After losing the gemstone, Deboth's apparent death, and Debo Hyogakki seeking vengeance for it using his Freeze-cry Tactic, a rage-filled Aigallon seeks to kill the Kyoryugers with a suicide attack in retaliation for not being able to cry, but the Kyoryugers survive while his armored body prevents his soul from entering Deboth Hell. Kaos secretly revives Aigallon, which causes the knight to suffer from inexplicable personality shifts and take on a psychotic side. During this time, he develops a crush on fellow knight Canderrilla and defects from the Deboth Army upon learning Kaos plans to kill her. While protecting her and Luckyulo from his replacement, Icelond, Aigallon learns the truth of his revival and confesses his feelings for her before taking a fatal blow meant for Canderrilla. Seeing what happened, a conflicted Ian forgoes his revenge and destroys Aigallon's armor, allowing his soul to find peace.

In battle, Aigallon wields the Tohohawk (トホホーク, Tohohōku) battle axe, which with he can perform the Tohohawk Boomerang (トホホークブーメラン, Tohohōku Būmeran) and Tohohawk Crash (トホホーククラッシュ, Tohohōku Kurasshu) attacks.

Aigallon is voiced by Yū Mizushima (水島 裕, Mizushima Yū).

==== Endolf ====
Resentful Knight Endolf (怨みの戦騎エンドルフ, Urami no Senki Endorufu) is the joker/winged monkey/candle-themed embodiment of Deboth's hatred who was created by Kaos to counter the Kyoryugers' Brave. Tasked with accelerating Deboth's evolution by aiding the other Deboth Knights and targeting the Kyoryugers themselves, Endolf endears himself to Aigallon and Canderrilla while making enemies out of Dogold and a distrustful Luckyulo. Endolf seemingly meets his end after being mortally wounded by Kyoryu Red Samba Carnival and becoming Dogold's host, but by Christmas, he amasses enough hatred to manipulate Dogold and arrange his freedom with the aid of the Debo Yanasanta brothers. While Canderrilla and Aigallon stop Endolf from exacting revenge, Endolf uses his new position as Kaos' second-in-command to turn Dogold into his personal slave in an attempt to break him. However, Dogold joins forces with Kyoryu Gold to destroy him.

In battle, Endolf wields the MunekagaMirror (ムネカガミラー, Munekagamirā), the TekagaMirror (テカガミラー, Tekagamirā), and the candlestick-like RosoCrusher (ローソクラッシャー, Rōsokurasshā) gun that doubles as the hilt of his sword.

Endolf is voiced by Masaya Matsukaze (松風 雅也, Matsukaze Masaya).

==== Icelond ====
New Sorrowful Knight Icelond (新・哀しみの戦騎アイスロンド, Shin Kanashimi no Senki Aisurondo), (Note: Icelond's name is a Japanese portmanteau of 哀, read as ai (アイ), and Rondo (ロンド).) is a faucet/conductor-themed Deboth Knight created by Kaos to serve as Aigallon's replacement in amassing sadness for Deboth's revival, eventually becoming one of Kaos' personal enforcers. He is sent to kill Canderrilla for betraying the Deboth Army, but Aigallon sacrifices himself to protect her before Kyoryu Black uses Aigallon's Tohohawk to destroy Icelond.

In battle, Icelond wields the Shiver Sheet Music (ガクブル楽譜, Gakuburu Gakufu) and the Despair Baton (ぜつぼうしきぼう, Zetsubō Shikibō) for performing sound-based attacks, such as the Explosive Musical Notes (爆音符, Bakuonpu).

Icelond is voiced by Ryōta Takeuchi (竹内 良太, Takeuchi Ryōta).

==== Killborero ====
New Joyful Knight Killborero (新・喜びの戦騎キルボレロ, Shin Yorokobi no Senki Kiruborero), (Note: Killborero's name is a Japanese portmanteau of 喜, read as ki (キ), and Bolero (ボレロ).) is a brass instrument-themed Deboth Knight created by Kaos to serve as Canderrilla's replacement in amassing joy for Deboth's revival, eventually becoming one of Kaos' personal enforcers. Amidst Deboth's endgame, Killborero enlarges and battles the Zyudenryu before Plezuon seemingly destroys him. While he resurfaces in the Kyoryugers' Spirit Base to destroy it, he is destroyed by Kyoryu Black, Blue, and Green.

In battle, Killborero wields the AppaRappa (アッパラッパー, Apparappā) trumpet, which allows him to utilize sound-based attacks.

Killborero is voiced by Akio Suyama (陶山 章央, Suyama Akio).

==== Zorima ====
The Zorima (ゾーリ魔, Zōrima; Zori Demons) are the Deboth Army's Paramecium (ゾウリムシ, zōrimushi)-themed foot soldiers created from scattered fragments of Deboth's body that grew into human-sized creatures and wields a Zoringun (ゾーリンガン, Zōringan). Due to their Deboth cells, groups of Zorima can clump together and merge into the dinosaur-like Giant Zorima (巨大ゾーリ魔, Kyodai Zōrima) to combat the Zyudenryu. Additionally, the Sengoku Zorima (戦国ゾーリ魔, Sengoku Zōrima) are armored variants who served under Debo Tangosekku during the Sengoku period and wield either a sword or a bident.

In an attempt to steal women's beauty, Canderrilla and Aigallon modify a Zorima into the drag queen-themed Beautiful Zoreamer (ビューティフルゾリー魔ー, Byūtifuru Zorīmā) and arm him with the Slimy Paint Brush (ヌル塗るブラシ, Nurunuru Burashi), which Beautiful Zoreamer can also use to steal the Kyoryugers' colors and boost his Zorima supporters' powers. After being defeated by Kyoryu Red Samba Carnival, Beautiful Zoreamer is enlarged by Luckyulo before he and his entourage of Giant Zorima and Cambrima are destroyed by Gigant BragiOh and PteraidenOh Dricera.

The Zorima are voiced by Yuuki Anai (穴井 勇輝, Anai Yūki) and Kazuki Komine (小峰 一己, Komine Kazuki) while Beautiful Zoreamer is voiced by Ryūsaku Chiziwa (千々和 竜策, Chiziwa Ryūsaku).

==== Cambrima ====
The Cambrima (カンブリ魔, Kanburima; Cambri Demon) are Cambrian period arthropod-themed guardian knights under Kaos created from all three of the Deboth Knights' energies who wield CamBlades (カンブレード, Kanburēdo), which can become Kikanbō (鬼カン棒) via Restoration Water. Despite being 100 times stronger than the Zorima, they have a month-long lifespan as most are subjected to being Dogold's hosts.

The Cambrima are voiced by Kenichirou Matsuda (松田 健一郎, Matsuda Ken'ichirō) and Tamotsu Nishiwaki (西脇 保, Nishiwaki Tamotsu).

==== Minor members ====
- Ferocious Knight D (獰猛の戦騎D, Dōmō no Senki Dī): An ancient ace/Toto/knight-themed Debo Knight and warmonger who wears the AceCape (エースケープ, Ēsukēpu) and can perform the Final Movement Deboth Finish (最終楽章デーボスフィニッシュ, Saishū Gakushō Dēbosu Finisshu) attack. First appearing in the film Zyuden Sentai Kyoryuger: Gaburincho of Music, Kaos created D during the Mesozoic to combat the Zyudenryu and harvest the dinosaurs' emotional energy. To complete the latter task, D took control of Tobaspino and used it to exterminate the dinosaurs before a priestess' singing freed the Zyudenryu, who crushed D. In the present, Kaos resurrects D and grants him the Deathryuger (デスリュウジャー, Desuryūjā) Zyudenchi so he can become the eponymous navy blue-colored, Kyoryuger-like warrior. While transformed, D wields the Flute Buster (フルートバスター, Furūto Basutā), which can be used as either a boomerang or a sword, and can perform the Demon Movement Deboth Finish (魔楽章デーボスフィニッシュ, Ma Gakushō Dēbosu Finisshu) finisher. D kidnaps the priestess' descendant, Mikoto Amano, and attempts to renew his efforts to use Tobaspino to destroy the world. Despite being mortally wounded and defeated by Kyoryu Red, D evolves into a new form that grants the use of the War Spear-Sword (ウォー槍刀, Wōsōdō) and the D-Racer (Dレーサー, Dī Rēsā) motorcycle and escapes Deboth Hell months later in episode 39 of the series to kidnap Mikoto once again and use her to raise an undead army. When the Kyoryugers foil his plans, D enlarges himself to destroy the world before he is hindered by Mikoto's singing and killed by SpinoDaiOh. D is voiced by Mamoru Miyano (宮野 真守, Miyano Mamoru).
- Land Majin Gadoma (大地の魔神ガドマ, Daichi no Majin Gadoma): A cemetery-themed giant who wields the Grave Enormous Power (墓威力, Hakairiki) and the Grave Shooting Beam (墓射光線, Hakai Kōsen). Gadoma was created by Deboth as a last line of defense during his original battle with the Zyudenryu before Bragigas mortally wounded the monster with the Gigant Cannon. Despite being weakened, Gadoma dragged Bragigas underground in what would become the lake bed of Lake Madō (魔洞湖, Madō-ko). While fragments of its body were laced in the Zyudenchi, Gadoma's core remained intact. In the present, Kaos has it fished out of Lake Madō before the lake dries out while the Kyoryugers revive Bragigas. After creating a new body from the surrounding ground, Gadoma overwhelms the Kyoryugers by using its fragments to invoke a curse on them before they eventually manage to break it. Gadoma is destroyed by Gigant Kyoryuzin, but it uses the last of its power to connect Earth to Deboth Hell.
- Demon Sword High Priest Mad Torin (魔剣神官マッドトリン, Maken Shinkan Maddo Torin): An Archaeopteryx-themed evil doppelgänger of Torin who wields the Mad Edge (マッドエッジ, Maddo Ejji) sword, which allows him to perform the Demon Sword Madness Flame (魔剣・マッドネスフレイム, Maken Maddonesu Fureimu) attack. He is created by Kaos to guard the portal to Deboth Hell, but Mad Torin is defeated in battle by Kyoryu Silver and killed by Gigant Kyoryuzin, which seals the portal. Mad Torin later returns from Deboth Hell during Deboth's endgame to warn him of Torin's actions before dying from his injuries. Mad Torin is voiced by Toshiyuki Morikawa, who also voices Torin.

==== Debo Monsters ====
The Debo Monsters (デーボモンスター, Dēbo Monsutā) are alien monsters created by Deboth and one of the Deboth Knights' energies. With the exception of the Zetsumates, the majority that followed them are primarily based on modern day objects and the occasional animals who correspond to the knight who created them. Deceased Debo Monsters are sent to Deboth Hell (デーボスヘル, Dēbosu Heru), also known as the Darkness of the Land (大地の闇, Daichi no Yami), under Lake Madō. When the lake is dried up, several of them are brought back and ingest items to regain their physical forms before the lake is restored. After the Kyoryugers seal the path to Deboth Hell and destroy several of the revived Debo Monsters however, Deboth loses the ability to create new Debo Monsters. Amidst Deboth's endgame, the Debo Monsters were to be revived once more, but Torin, the Spirit Rangers, and Canderrilla destroy Deboth Hell and ensure the Debo Monsters' permanent demise.

- Debo Peshango (デーボ・ペシャンゴ, Dēbo Peshango): A car crusher-themed Debo Monster created to serve Aigallon by using his Peshan Beam (ペシャン光線, Peshan Kōsen) to flatten buildings. He is defeated by the Kyoryugers, enlarged by Luckyulo, and destroyed by Kyoryuzin. Debo Peshango is voiced by Ryuzou Ishino (石野 竜三, Ishino Ryūzō).
- Debo Royaroya (デーボ・ローヤローヤ, Dēbo Rōyarōya): A prison-themed Debo Monster created to serve Dogold by using his Chain Roya (チェーンローヤ, Chēn Rōya) to entrap martial artists and athletes in inescapable cages to enrage them. He is defeated by Kyoryu Red and Green, enlarged by Luckyulo, and destroyed by Kyoryuzin Stegotchi Zakutor. Debo Royaroya is voiced by Takashi Nagasako (長嶝 高士, Nagasako Takashi).
- Debo Doronboss (デーボ・ドロンボス, Dēbo Doronbosu): A crow/bank vault-themed Debo Monster created to serve Aigallon by using his chest-mounted Bick Bank's (ビックバンク, Bikku Banku) hammerspace, Atare Feather (アタレ羽根, Atare Bane) shurikens, and Aigallon's invincibility cloak to deprive humans of their favorite things. He is defeated by the Kyoryugers, enlarged by Luckyulo, and destroyed by Kyoryuzin Western. Debo Doronboss is voiced by Tetsu Shiratori (白鳥 哲, Shiratori Tetsu).
- Debo Bathisie (デーボ・バティシエ, Dēbo Batishie): A pastry chef-themed Debo Monster created to serve Canderrilla by using his Whitto Whipper (ホイッとホイッパー, Hoitto Hoippā) whisk and Delicious Cream Piping Bag (クリームおいしぼり袋, Kurīmu Oishiboribukuro) to produce cakes that make humans unbearably happy. After Debo Viruson infects him however, he transforms into a Cavity Violent Form (虫歯凶暴態, Mushiba Kyōbōtai) and uses his newly acquired Cavity Beam (ムシバビーム, Mushiba Bīmu) teeth bullets to give people painful cavities and Delicious Fireball Piping Bag (火の玉おいしぼり袋, Hi no Tama Oishiboribukuro) to shoot fireballs. Debo Bathisie is eventually defeated by the Kyoryugers, enlarged by Luckyulo, and destroyed by Kyoryuzin. Debo Bathisie is voiced by Taiki Matsuno (松野 太紀, Matsuno Taiki).
- Debo Yakigonte (デーボ・ヤキゴンテ, Dēbo Yakigonte): A branding iron/taiyaki mold-themed Debo Monster who wields the Achichi Iron (アチチ焼きゴテ, Achichi Yakigote) and the Handar Saber (ハンダーサーベル, Handā Sāberu). He is created to serve Dogold by using his Copy Iron Hands (コピー焼きゴン手, Kopī Yakigonte) to disguise Zorima, grant them the ability to tap into a person's subconscious, and infuriate people by telling them their worst trait. Debo Yakigonte is defeated by the Kyoryugers, enlarged by Luckyulo, and destroyed by Kyoryuzin Macho. Debo Yakigonte is voiced by Kenta Miyake (三宅 健太, Miyake Kenta).
- Debo Kokodoko (デーボ・ココドーコ, Dēbo Kokodōko): A maze-themed Debo Monster who wields the Big Scythe Goal (ビッグサイズゴール, Biggu Saizu Gōru) flag. He is created to serve Aigallon by forcing people to see illusions of deceased family members. However, Debo Kokodoko is defeated by Kyoryu Blue, enlarged by Luckyulo, and destroyed by Kyoryuzin Western. Debo Kokodoko is voiced by Kōsuke Toriumi (鳥海 浩輔, Toriumi Kōsuke).
- Debo Honenukki (デーボ・ホネヌッキー, Dēbo Honenukkī): A bone-themed Debo Monster created to serve Canderrilla by using his Bone-Extraction of Love (愛の抜骨, Ai no Bakkotsu) ability to remove male humans' thoracic vertebrae to make them her ardent admirers. He is defeated by Kyoryu Pink and Gold after they exploit Debo Honenukki's inability to use his powers on women, enlarged by Luckyulo, and destroyed by Kyoryuzin and PteraidenOh. Debo Honenukki is voiced by Takaya Kuroda (黒田 崇矢, Kuroda Takaya).
- Debo Tangosekku (デーボ・タンゴセック, Dēbo Tangosekku): A Children's Day-themed Debo Monster who wields the Kenka RyōSaber (喧嘩両成刃（ケンカリョウセイバー）, Kenka Ryōseibā; Fighting Both Sides-Blaming Saber), the ability to transform into a Koinobori-esque form, and the Koinobori Tank (鯉のぼり端句（タンク）, Koinobori Tanku), which can produce Koi Fog (鯉霧（コイキリ）, Koi Kiri) and Terrible Koi Fog (ス鯉霧（スゴイキリ）, Sugoi Kiri) for transporting himself and his opponents to another dimension. He was originally created to serve Dogold during the Sengoku period before returning in the present to kidnap young boys and make them violent. He is defeated by the Kyoryugers, enlarged by Luckyulo, and destroyed by Raiden Kyoryuzin. In the DVD special It's Here! Armed On Midsummer Festival!!, he and Debo Tanabanta are revived as the ghostly Festival Brothers (お祭りブラザーズ, Omatsuri Burazāzu) and possess Nobuharu before they are destroyed by Kyoryu Red and Gold. Debo Tangosekku is voiced by Noriaki Sugiyama (杉山 紀彰, Sugiyama Noriaki) in the series and Takahiro Yoshimizu (吉水 孝宏, Yoshimizu Takahiro) in the special.
- Debo Jakireen (デーボ・ジャキリーン, Dēbo Jakirīn): A cutlery-themed Debo Monster who wields the built-in Loss Army Knives (十損ナイフ, Jisson Naifu). He is created to serve Aigallon by using his Arrow-Distinguishing Glasses (矢印見極めがね, Yajirushi Mikiwamegane) and Relationship-Cutting Shears (関係断ちバサミ, Kankei Tachibasami) to destroy relationships. Debo Jakireen is defeated by Kyoryu Green and Gold, enlarged by Luckyulo, and destroyed by PteraidenOh Western. Debo Jakireen is voiced by Kōzō Shioya (塩屋 浩三, Shioya Kōzō).
- Debo Kibishidesu (デーボ・キビシーデス, Dēbo Kibishīdesu): A strict classroom-themed Debo Monster who wields the Blastic Teaching (ブラスティック教鞭, Burasutikku Kyōben) pointer, the left forearm-mounted Gatling Pencil-HB (ガトリングペンシル-HB, Gatoringu Penshiu Eichi Bī) gun, and knowledge on the Kyoryugers' arsenal. He is created by Kaos to train Luckyulo into a more effective Deboth Army member, but the Debo Monster kidnaps Amy instead and is destroyed by Kyoryu Gold. Following his return from Deboth Hell, Debo Kibishidesu forms the Deboth Academy Private School (私立デーボス学園, Shiritsu Dēbosu Gakuen) with Debo Spokorn and Debo Akkumuun to exact revenge on the Kyoryugers, only to be defeated by Kyoryu Silver, enlarged by Luckyulo, and destroyed by Gigant Kyoryuzin. Debo Kibishidesu is voiced by Tetsu Inada (稲田 徹, Inada Tetsu).
- Debo Zaihon (デーボ・ザイホーン, Dēbo Zaihōn): A treasure-themed Debo Monster who wields the Kokohore Wonder (ココホレワンダー, Kokohore Wandā) pickaxe, Gold Coin Bombs (金貨爆弾, Kinka Bakudan), and the ability to perform the Lithograph Stratum Drop (石版地層落とし, Sekiban Chisō Otoshi) attack. He is created to serve Canderrilla by making humans find treasures. He is defeated by the Kyoryugers, enlarged by Luckyulo, and destroyed by Raiden Kyoryuzin. Debo Zaihon is voiced by Hajime Iijima (飯島 肇, Iijima Hajime).
- Debo Kyawaeen (デーボ・キャワイーン, Dēbo Kyawaīn): A vampire-themed Debo Monster who wields the Kyawa Whip (キャワウィップ, Kyawa Wippu), the ability to enslave men, and assume the form of baby-like monster whose inherent cuteness forces people to fall in love with her. In this form, she wields the NukeGaragara (ヌケガラガラ, Nukegaragara) baby rattle, which allows her to perform the Rattling Beam (ガラガラビーム, Garagara Bīmu) attack. As one of Aigallon's prized minions, she is tasked with forcing doting parents to abandon their spoiled children in a two-pronged scheme to siphon joy from the former and sadness from the latter. However, the Kyoryugers defeat her before she is enlarged by Luckyulo and destroyed by PteraidenOh Bunpachy. Debo Kyawaeen is voiced by Mika Kanai (かない みか, Kanai Mika).
- Debo Tanabanta (デーボ・タナバンタ, Dēbo Tanabanta): A vain and prideful Tanabata-themed Debo Monster who wields the Bamboo Forest Spear (竹林槍（チクリンやり）, Chikurin Yari) and the ability to perform the Bamboo Leaf Killing Method (笹の葉殺法, Sasa no Ha Sappō) and Bamboo Spear Slash (竹槍スラッシュ, Takeyari Surasshu) attacks. He is created to serve Canderrilla by granting people's Tanabata wishes and siphon their joy until they die the day after. He is defeated by the Kyoryugers and Dantetsu Kiryu, enlarged by Luckyulo, and destroyed by Kyoryuzin Kung-Fu. In the DVD special It's Here! Armed On Midsummer Festival!!, he and Debo Tangosekku are revived as the ghostly Festival Brothers and possess Nobuharu before they are destroyed by Kyoryu Red and Gold. Debo Tanabanta is voiced by Masakazu Morita (森田 成一, Morita Masakazu) in the series and Takahiro Yoshimizu in the special.
- Debo Akkumuun (デーボ・アックムーン, Dēbo Akkumūn): A counting sheep/sleep-themed Debo Monster who wields the Memory-Foam Shield (低反発シールド, Teihanpatsu Shīrudo) pillow, the Restful Bomber (安眠ボンバー, Anmin Bonbā) pillow, and the Explosive Flame Bomber (爆炎ボンバー, Bakuen Bonbā) pillow. He is created by Luckyulo to use his dream invasion ability to give the Kyoryugers nightmares in retaliation for the Deboth Army's apparent destruction, but they are able to defeat the Debo Monster. Debo Akkumuun is subsequently enlarged by Luckyulo and destroyed by PteraidenOh, PlezuOh, and Kyoryuzin Stegotchi Zakutor. Following his return from Deboth Hell, Debo Akkumuun becomes a student under Debo Kibishidesu and Spokorn and joins them in a scheme to switch the Kyoryugers' minds using his newly acquired Osakimakkurar (オサキマックラー, Osakimakkurā) pillow before he is defeated by the Kyoryugers, enlarged by Luckyulo, and destroyed by Gigant Kyoryuzin. Debo Akkumuun is voiced by Kōki Miyata (宮田 幸季, Miyata Kōki).
- Debo Shinobinba (デーボ・シノビンバ, Dēbo Shinobinba): A ninja/squid-themed Debo Monster who wields the Shirueitō (印影刀; Seal Shadow Sword) sword and possesses the Debo Ninpō (デーボ忍法, Dēbo Ninpō) techniques Scatter Shuriken (乱れ手裏剣, Midare Shuriken), Shadow Clone (影分身, Kage Bunshin), and Shadow Seal (影封印, Kage Fūin). He is created to serve Endolf by killing Daigo to make the other Kyoryugers resentful. He is defeated by Kyoryu Red Carnival, enlarged by Luckyulo, and destroyed by Bakuretsu Kyoryuzin. Debo Shinobinba is voiced by Yousuke Itou (伊藤 陽佑, Itō Yōsuke).
- Debo Karyudosu (デーボ・カリュードス, Dēbo Karyūdosu): A hunter/blue-ringed octopus/cheetah-themed Debo Monster who wields the Natan Hansen (ナタン・ハンセン, Natan Hansen) machete, the Hulk Bowgun (ハルク・ボーガン, Haruku Bōgan) crossbow, and the Road Warrior (ロード・ウォリヤー, Rōdo Woriyā) motorcycle. He is created to serve Endolf by killing Daigo to make the other Kyoryugers resentful, only to be destroyed by Kyoryu Black, Blue, Green, and Pink. Debo Karyudosu is voiced by Hiroshi Tsuchida (土田 大, Tsuchida Hiroshi).
- Debo Zaihodoron (デーボ・ザイホドローン, Dēbo Zaihodorōn): A hybrid Debo Monster who wields Debo Zaihon's Kokohore Wonder and Debo Doronboss' Bick Bank. He is accidentally created by Luckyulo to steal a Lost Stone, though the latter was attempting to recreate Debo Doronboss and Aigallon believed he meant Debo Zaihon. Debo Zaihodoron is defeated by Kyoryu Red Macho Carnival, enlarged by Luckyulo, and destroyed by Bakuretsu Kyoryuzin. Debo Zaihodoron is voiced by Hajime Iijima.
- Debo Vaacance (デーボ・バーカンス, Dēbo Bākansu): A summer vacation-themed Debo Monster who is equipped with the crab pincer-like You Scream Arm (ユースクリームアーム, Yū Sukurīmu Āmu) for a right arm and the Ice Cream Arm (アイスクリームアーム, Aisu Kurīmu Āmu) for a left arm, which allows him to perform the Triple Drill Cream (トリプルドリルクリーム, Toripuru Doriru Kurīmu) attack. He was created by Canderrilla during the summer, but she forgot about him until autumn began. Despite his apparent uselessness, Dogold offers to help by having Debo Vacance enlarged, enter Earth's orbit, and use his Holiday Beam (ホリデービーム, Horidē Bīmu) to turn humans into lazy "Holi-Humans" as well as enrage unaffected individuals so they can siphon their joy and anger respectively all while a clone takes the Debo Monster's place to distract the Kyoryugers. After Kyoryu Red destroys the clone, Debo Vacance shrinks down and attempts to flee, only to be destroyed by Kyoryu Red Kung-Fu Carnival. Debo Vacance is voiced by Yasuhiro Takato (高戸 靖広, Takato Yasuhiro).
- Debo Spokorn (デーボ・スポコーン, Dēbo Supokōn): A sports equipment-themed Debo Monster who wields the Separating Miracle Ball (分裂魔球, Bunretsu Makyū), which allows him to perform the Three-Point Shoot (スリーポイントシュート, Surī Pointo Shūto) attack. He is created by Dogold to train the Zorima into a more effective fighting force, distract the Kyoryugers from the Deboth Army's attempt to steal a Lost Stone, and help Aigallon fill his sadness quota. The Debo Monster and his team are defeated by the Kyoryugers, enlarged by Luckyulo, and destroyed by Bakuretsu Kyoryuzin, PteraidenOh Western, and PlezuOh Ankydon. Following his return from Deboth Hell, Debo Spokorn becomes the Deboth Academy Private School's coach to help Debo Kibishidesu educate Debo Akkumuun and exact revenge on the Kyoryugers. However, they are defeated by the Kyoryugers, enlarged by Luckyulo, and destroyed by Gigant Kyoryuzin. Debo Spokorn is voiced by Takeshi Kusao (草尾 毅, Kusao Takeshi).
- Debo Akidamonne (デーボ・アキダモンネ, Dēbo Akidamonne): An autumn-themed Debo Monster who wields the Akiakine (アキア杵, Akiakine) and the Achilleusu (アキレ臼, Akireusu) mortar and pestle. He can also perform the Chestnut Bomb (栗爆弾, Kuri Bakudan) attack, the Dead Leaf Attack (枯れ葉攻撃, Kareha Kōgeki), the Tsukimi Dango Attack (月見だんご攻撃, Tsukimi Dango Kōgeki), the Super Chestnut Bomb (スーパー栗爆弾, Sūpā Kuri Bakudan) attack, and the Super Tsukimi Dango Attack (スーパー月見だんご攻撃, Sūpā Tsukimi Dango Kōgeki). He is created to serve Aigallon by pulling people into the Autumn Zone (オータムゾーン, Ōtamu Zōn) pocket dimension and siphon their sadness, only to be defeated by the Kyoryugers, enlarged by Luckyulo, and destroyed by PteraidenOh Parasagun. Debo Akidamonne is voiced by Takehiro Murozono (室園 丈裕, Murozono Takehiro).
- Debo Tairyon (デーボ・タイリョーン, Dēbo Tairyōn): A durable fishing tackle/marlin-themed Debo Monster who wields the Firmly Fishing Rod (ガッ釣り竿, Gattsurizao) and the Seafood Heaping Harpoon (海鮮山モリ, Kaisen Yamamori). He is created by Kaos to retrieve Gadoma's core from Lake Madō. Once he fulfills his mission, Debo Tairyon fights and is defeated by the Kyoryugers and Spirit Rangers, enlarged by Luckyulo, and destroyed by Gigant BragiOh. Debo Tairyon is voiced by Kiyoyuki Yanada (梁田 清之, Yanada Kiyoyuki).
- Debo Kantokku (デーボ・カントック, Dēbo Kantokku): A film director/prop-themed Debo Monster who wields the clapperboard-like Gachinko Kachinko (ガチンコカチンコ) axe and the ability to create film genre-themed scenarios. He is created by Canderrilla to help her stage romantic scenes and entrap men that fall for her. He is defeated by Kyoryu Blue with Canderrilla's indirect help, enlarged by Luckyulo, and destroyed by Gigant Kyoryuzin. Debo Kantokku is voiced by Wataru Takagi (高木 渉, Takagi Wataru).
- Debo Yanasanta (デーボ・ヤナサンタ, Dēbo Yanasanta): A quintuplet of Christmas-themed Debo Monster brothers who wield Christmas tree-like swords, the Rocket Boosturkey (ロケットブースターキー, Roketto Būsutākī) jetpack, the ability to fuse with each other to increase their strength, and perform the Merry Chrismash (メリークリスマッシュ, Merī Kurisumasshu), Candle Beam (キャンドルビーム, Kyandoru Bīmu), and Present Bomb (プレゼント爆弾, Purezento Bakudan) attacks. They are seemingly created to serve Dogold by distributing gifts containing Deboth's Super-Growth Cells (超増殖細胞, Chō Zōshoku Saibō) to siphon disappointed children's anger and merge into giant Clone Deboth (クローンデーボス, Kurōn Dēbosu). The first and second Debo Yanasanta merge into a form with 12 times their individual strength, but are defeated by Kyoryu Red and Gold while the Kyoryugers destroy the Clone Deboth. The remaining brothers return to Japan to capture Dantetsu Kiryu on Dogold's orders and merge into a form with 345 times their individual strength. However, they betray Dogold for their true master, Endolf, who enlarges them before they are destroyed by Gigant Kyoryuzin, PteraidenOh Ankydon, and PlezuOh Bunpachy. The Debo Yanasanta brothers are all voiced by Chō (チョー).

===== Zetsumates =====
The Zetsumates (ゼツメイツ, Zetsumeitsu) (Note: "Zetsumates" comes from the Japanese word zetsumetsu (絶滅, "extinction").) are a trio of ancient Debo Monsters infamous for causing the Cretaceous–Paleogene extinction event that killed the dinosaurs. Working together, they can perform the Deboth MetsuBall (デーボス滅ボール, Dēbosu Metsubōru) attack. Though each is destroyed individually in the present, the Zetsumates are resurrected by Kaos to stop Plezuon's return and get revenge on the Kyoryugers, though they are all destroyed once more.

- Debo Hyogakki (デーボ・ヒョーガッキ, Dēbo Hyōgakki): An Impact winter/Smilodon-themed Debo Monster who wields the TsuraLaunchers (ツラランチャー, Tsuraranchā), which can fire the Hyogakki Ice Bombs (ヒョーガッキ・アイスボム, Hyōgakki Aisu Bomu). After being destroyed by Kyoryu Red and Gabutyra, he is revived alongside his fellow Zetsumates to attack Plezuon Lab, but are repelled. Following Deboth's apparent death, Debo Hyogakki attempts to exact revenge with his Freeze-cry Tactic (フリーズクライ戦法, Furīzu Kurai Senpō) to freeze people alive via their tears, only to be defeated by the Kyoryugers, enlarged by Luckyulo, and destroyed by Bakuretsu Kyoryuzin. Debo Hyogakki is voiced by Kenji Nomura (乃村 健次, Nomura Kenji).
- Debo Viruson (デーボ・ウイルスン, Dēbo Uirusun): A virus/devil-themed Debo Monster who wields the ViruSpear (ウイルスピア, Uirusupia), the ability to infect others with various diseases and control them, bio-manipulation, and can spawn clones of himself. After being revived during the Middle Ages, Debo Viruson was seemingly destroyed by Kyoryu Cyan and Ankydon. In reality, a piece of him ended up in Ankydon's Zyudenchi and regenerated, allowing the Debo Monster to infect the Zyudenryu over the centuries and project his image outside of it. Though he inadvertently sabotages Canderrilla's scheme with Debo Bathisie, Debo Viruson offers his aid to her by using his Nemunemu Sickness (ネムネム病, Nemunemu Byō) to make humans fall into a permanent slumber filled with sweet dreams. After Amy tricks him into leaving Ankydon, he is destroyed by Kyoryuzin Macho. After being revived alongside his fellow Zetsumates, Debo Viruson creates the computer virus-themed Debo Computer Viruson (デーボ・コンピュータウイルスン, Dēbo Konpyūta Uirusun) to destroy Plezuon Lab while he infects a dam with Restoration Water using his Good Culture Ability (グッド培養能力, Guddo Baiyō Nōryoku) to revive Deboth. However, Debo Viruson is enlarged and absorbed by the reawakened Deboth, which causes Debo Computer Viruson to die as well. Both Debo Viruson and Debo Computer Viruson are voiced by Eiji Takemoto (竹本 英史, Takemoto Eiji).
- Debo Nagareboshi (デーボ・ナガレボーシ, Dēbo Nagarebōshi): A meteoroid/Chicxulub impactor-themed Debo Monster who wields the NagareboShields (流レボシールド, Nagareboshīrudo) and the Star HyuMachine (星ヒューマシン, Hoshi Hyūmashin). Using the meteorites on his abdomen, he can perform the Meteorite Ball (隕石ボール, Inseki Bōru), Galaxy Ball (大銀河ボール, Dai Ginga Bōru), and Super Galaxy Ball (超銀河ボール, Chō Ginga Bōru) attacks. After being revived in sixth century China, Debo Nagareboshi battled Kyoryu Gray before being sealed within a volcano. By the present, the former is awakened by Deboth's increasing power. After learning of his fellow Zetsumates' demises, Debo Nagareboshi vows to avenge them, only to be destroyed by Kyoryuzin Kung-Fu. He is later revived alongside his fellow Zetsumates, but is destroyed by PlezuOh. Debo Nagareboshi is voiced by Kazuki Yao (矢尾 一樹, Yao Kazuki).

===== Other Debo Monsters =====
- Attack Team Four Seasons (攻撃団・四季, Kōgekidan Shiki): A quartet of seasonal-themed Debo Monsters who were created to serve Arslevan in 2114, only to be killed by the 2114 Kyoryugers, and appear exclusively in the V-Cinema special Zyuden Sentai Kyoryuger Returns: Hundred Years After.
  - Debo Harudamonne (デーボ・ハルダモンネ, Dēbo Harudamonne): A spring-themed Debo Monster who resembles Debo Tangosekku and wields the shamisen-like Haruichiben (ハルイチベン). Debo Harudamonne is voiced by Noriaki Sugiyama.
  - Debo Natsudamonne (デーボ・ナツダモンネ, Dēbo Natsudamonne): A summer-themed Debo Monster who resembles Debo Vacance. Debo Natsudamonne is voiced by Yasuhiro Takato.
  - Debo Akidamonne: An autumn-themed Debo Monster identical to Aigallon's version. Debo Akidamonne is voiced by Takehiro Murozono.
  - Debo Fuyudamonne (デーボ・フユダモンネ, Dēbo Fuyudamonne): A winter-themed Debo Monster who resembles Debo Yanasanta. Debo Fuyudamonne is voiced by Chō.
- Debo Bravesky (デーボ・ブレイブスキー, Dēbo Bureibusukī): An otaku/Mount Rushmore-themed Debo Monster who wields the ManiAxe (マニアックス, Maniakkusu), can perform the Love Painful Flash (愛・こじら閃光, Ai Kojirasenkō) attack, and appears exclusively in the web-exclusive special episode This Is Brave! Battle Frontier (これぞブレイブ！たたかいのフロンティア, Korezo Bureibu! Tatakai no Furontia). He is created to serve Canderrilla, but is defeated by the Kyoryugers, enlarged by Luckyulo, and killed by Raiden Kyoryuzin. Debo Bravesky is voiced by Tomokazu Sugita (杉田 智和, Sugita Tomokazu).

=== Canderrilla ===
Joyful Knight Canderrilla (喜びの戦騎キャンデリラ, Yorokobi no Senki Kyanderira) is a vain, air-headed, happy-go-lucky plastic doll/hearts/Dorothy Gale-themed monster who encourages others to "keep smiling!" (キープスマイリング!, kīpu sumairingu!). Initially a member of the Deboth Army, Canderrilla is tasked with amassing joy so Deboth can better understand human emotions after they resurfaced. She wholeheartedly supports the Deboth Army until she creates the Debo Monster, Debo Kantokku, and indirectly helps Nobuharu defeat her creation. As she starts to have second thoughts and leaves the Deboth Army to find the dismissed Luckyulo, Canderrilla is eventually deemed a threat and replaced by Killborero as Deboth's Joyful Knight. After Aigallon sacrifices himself to protect her, she and a repentant Luckyulo temporarily go into hiding before helping Torin and the Spirit Rangers destroy Deboth Hell. Soon after, Canderrilla is motivated by Nobuharu to help humans.

During the events of the crossover film Ressha Sentai ToQger vs. Kyoryuger: The Movie and the Korean sequel series Zyuden Sentai Kyoryuger Brave, Canderrilla helps reunite the Kyoryugers so they can join forces with the ToQgers to defeat Devius and support the Kyoryuger Brave in the wake of the Neo-Deboth Army's attack respectively.

When the Deboth Army returns in 2114 during the events of the V-Cinema special Zyuden Sentai Kyoryuger Returns: Hundred Years After, Canderrilla helps restore the Kyoryugers as Wise Goddess Canderrilla (賢神キャンデリラ, Kenshin Kyanderira). However, due to Arslevan's influence and her desire to be helpful like Torin, she temporarily forgets the original team's colors before Nobuharu's descendant helps her remember.

In battle, she wields the CahaHalberd (キャハハルバード, Kyahaharubādo), which allows her to perform the Joyful Dance (喜びの舞, Yorokobi no Mai) attack, and can utilize her singing voice to enhance Deboth cell-based beings with her "Joyful Song".

Canderrilla is voiced by Haruka Tomatsu (戸松 遥, Tomatsu Haruka), who also portrays her human form.

=== Luckyulo ===
Funfilled Spy Luckyulo (楽しみの密偵ラッキューロ, Tanoshimi no Mittei Rakkyūro) is Canderrilla's childish rag doll/diamonds/Scarecrow-themed subordinate and bodyguard and former member of the Deboth Army. While he aids all three of Deboth's knights, Kaos regards him as a lazy eyesore as Luckyulo spends more time reading manga instead of contributing to Deboth's revival and makes several failed attempts to correct his behavior. When the Deboth Army is apparently destroyed, Luckyulo attempts to defeat the Kyoryugers himself by creating Debo Akkumuun to attack them in their dreams. Though this scheme fails, Luckyulo gains Kaos' praise and inspires Endolf's creation. Following the creation of Deboth Super-Growth Cells however, Kaos deems Luckyulo expendable and orders him to be killed. After Aigallon sacrifices himself to save Luckyulo, the latter and a distraught Canderrilla go into hiding before resurfacing to help her get into Deboth Hell with his Rattatta Lantern (らったったランタン, Rattatta Rantan) so they can help Torin and the Spirit Rangers. Soon after, Luckyulo decides to assist Canderrilla in helping humans.

When the Deboth Army returns in 2114 during the events of the V-Cinema special Zyuden Sentai Kyoryuger Returns: Hundred Years After, a mature Wise God Apprentice Luckyulo (賢神見習いラッキューロ, Kenjin Minarai Rakkyūro) helps Canderrilla revive the Kyoryugers to combat them.

During his time with the Deboth Army, Luckyulo is charged with enlarging the Debo Monsters using Restoration Water (復元水, Fukugensui), a fluid that intensifies anything made of Deboth cells, kept in the pumpkin-themed Sukusuku Joylo (スクスクジョイロ, Sukusuku Joiro) watering can. He can also use his Ponpon Pouch (ぽんぽんポーチ, Ponpon Pōchi) wallet to store various things. Kaos later gives Luckyulo Shukushuku Balls (シュクシュクボール, Shukushuku Bōru) to absorb Restoration Water and shrink enlarged Debo Monsters if necessary.

Luckyulo is voiced by Ai Orikasa (折笠 愛, Orikasa Ai), who also portrays his elderly female human disguise.

=== Spirit Rangers ===
The Spirit Rangers (スピリットレンジャー, Supiritto Renjā) are a duo of ghostly Kyoryugers who simply utilize their personal Zyudenchi to transform.

==== Ramirez ====
Ramirez (ラミレス, Ramiresu) is an optimistic European man who became Ankydon's partner and fought as the "Steel Brave" (鋼の勇者, Hagane no Yūsha), Kyoryu Cyan (キョウリュウシアン, Kyōryū Shian), five centuries prior to the series. By the present, he became a Spirit Ranger due to his bond with his Zyudenryu and provides assistance to the modern day Kyoryugers when he can before eventually passing on his powers to Nobuharu's sister, Yuko Fukui.

As Kyoryu Cyan, Ramirez wields the Spirit Hammer (スピリットハンマー, Supiritto Hanmā).

Ramirez is portrayed by Robert Baldwin (ロバート・ボールドウィン, Robāto Bōrudowin).

==== Tessai ====
Tessai (鉄砕) is a focused yet hard-headed martial artist from sixth century China who regards himself as the embodiment of yin and yang. When the Deboth Army attacked his homeland, Tessai became Bunpachy's partner and fought the threat as the "Charging Brave" (激突の勇者, Gekitotsu no Yūsha), Kyoryu Gray (キョウリュウグレー, Kyōryū Gurē), before becoming a Spirit Ranger like Ramirez. Once he tests the modern day Kyoryugers' worthiness and helps them become stronger, Tessai assists them in their fight against the Deboth Army before eventually passing on his powers to his descendant, Shinya Tsukouchi.

As Kyoryu Gray, Tessai's signature move is the Tessai-Ken: Violent Charge (鉄砕拳・激烈突破, Tessaiken Gekiretsu Toppa).

Tessai is portrayed by Masayuki Deai (出合 正幸, Deai Masayuki).

=== Kyoryu Violet ===
Kyoryu Violet (キョウリュウバイオレット, Kyōryū Baioretto) is a moniker utilized by its original user and his successor. As the "Marine Brave" (海の勇者, Umi no Yūsha), they carry a Gaburivolver and Gaburicalibur as their transformation device and sidearm respectively like the primary Kyoryugers.

==== Doctor Woorushade ====
Doctor Woorushade (ドクター・ウルシェード, Dokutā Urushēdo) is a genius scientist who has a habit of getting carried away and giving himself back problems. Having defeated Plezuon to become Kyoryu Violet, decades prior to the series, he invented and mass-produced the Kyoryugers' arsenal from his underwater Plezuon Lab (プレズオンラボ, Purezuon Rabo). After the primary Kyoryugers are assembled, Doctor Woorushade left on a six-month expedition into space to learn more about Deboth. Once he fulfills this mission, he returns to Earth to entrust Plezuon to the Kyoryugers prior to being temporarily hospitalized while fighting the Deboth Army. Due to this, he is forced to retire and pass on the mantle of Kyoryu Violet to his granddaughter, Yayoi.

Doctor Woorushade is portrayed by Shigeru Chiba (千葉 繁, Chiba Shigeru), who also serves as the series' narrator and voice of the Kyoryugers' weapons.

==== Yayoi Woorushade ====
Yayoi Woorushade (弥生ウルシェード, Yayoi Urushēdo) is Doctor Woorushade's granddaughter and assistant. After he is temporarily hospitalized following his return to Earth, she takes over her grandfather's task of upgrading Plezuon and inherits the mantle of Kyoryu Violet from him despite her initial fears that she could not live up to it. After becoming Kyoryu Violet, she provides technical and combat assistance to the Kyoryugers whenever she is not training with her grandfather.

As Kyoryu Violet, Yayoi primarily wields the Gaburu Cannon in Bayonet Mode (銃剣モード, Jūken Mōdo).

Yayoi Woorushade is portrayed by Marie Iitoyo (飯豊 まりえ, Iitoyo Marie). As a child, Yayoi is portrayed by Rinka Nakayama (中山 凛香, Nakayama Rinka).

=== Kyoryu Silver ===
Kyoryu Silver (キョウリュウシルバー, Kyōryū Shirubā) is a moniker utilized by its original user and his successor. As the "Flashing Brave" (閃光の勇者, Senkō no Yūsha), they utilize an upgraded version of the Gaburivolver called the Giga Gaburivolver (ギガガブリボルバー, Giga Gaburiborubā) to transform.

==== Torin ====
Wise God Torin (賢神トリン, Kenjin Torin) is the anthropomorphic Archaeopteryx-like mentor of the Kyoryugers. Originally known as Demon Sword High Priest Torin (魔剣神官トリン, Maken Shinkan Torin), he was a member of the Deboth Army who was created to attack Earth 100 million years prior to the series. However, Torin came to love the planet's beauty and resolved to protect its lifeforms instead. Though he was unable to save the dinosaurs and forced to watch his partner Bragigas sacrifice himself to damage their enemy's heart, Torin managed to freeze Deboth's body and wound his older brother, Kaos. Following the fight, he used Bragigas' remains to create the Spirit Base under the "Golden Land", which would go on to become Japan, and dedicated himself to keeping Deboth from fully resurrecting by creating the Kyoryugers over the intervening millennia.

While helping them, Torin successfully hides his heritage from the Kyoryugers until Kaos works with Endolf to seek revenge by exposing Torin's true nature. Torin attempts to commit suicide to ensure Deboth could not be resurrected, but his allies revive him to prove that they maintain their faith in him. After reuniting with Bragigas, Torin initially believes he is not worthy to be his partner. With help from Daigo and Yayoi, Torin realizes he is the embodiment of Brave and gains the Giga Gaburivolver so he can become Kyoryu Silver to aid the Kyoryugers in battle. Following Deboth's resurrection, Torin works with Dantetsu Kiryu to arrange the former's death so he can destroy Deboth Hell and ensure Deboth's permanent demise.

Torin's spirit returns during the events of the Korean sequel series Zyuden Sentai Kyoryuger Brave and the V-Cinema special Zyuden Sentai Kyoryuger Returns: Hundred Years After to recruit the Kyoryuger Brave and help Dai-kun become the new Kyoryu Red respectively.

On his own, Torin can teleport, sense Deboth cell-based beings like himself, fire energy orbs, and wields the Feather Edge (フェザーエッジ, Fezā Ejji) sword in battle. However, he is unable to remain outside of the Spirit Base's healing aura for extended periods of time due to his past injuries, which cause him to slowly petrify. After Tessai temporarily modifies the Maximum Zyudenchi, Torin can assume the human alias of Torii (鳥居). As Kyoryu Silver, he is able to use the Feather Edge to perform the Torinity Straizer (トリニティストレイザー, Toriniti Sutoreizā) finisher.

Wise God Torin is voiced by Toshiyuki Morikawa (森川 智之, Morikawa Toshiyuki), who also portrays his "Torii" alias.

==== Dantetsu Kiryu ====
Dantetsu Kiryu (桐生 ダンテツ, Kiryū Dantetsu) is Daigo's father who took him on worldly travels. When Daigo was an infant, Dantetsu was bathed in the Light of the Earth and gained the ability to hear the planet's melody. After being found by Torin, who refers to him as mankind's King, Dantetsu proved instrumental in the development of the modern Kyoryugers' arsenal. A decade prior to the series, Dantetsu sensed the Deboth Army gathering strength and left his amber pendant with Daigo before embarking on a quest to find the Lost Stones. By the present day, he returns to give Torin the Lost Stones he had found by then and save Daigo from Dogold. Upon locating the Earth's original melody, Dantetsu and Torin arrange the latter's death so he can destroy Deboth hell while the former takes on the mantle of Kyoryu Silver to help the Kyoryugers defeat Deboth himself.

Due to being empowered by the Light of the Earth, Dantetsu possesses the Earth's Rage, which allows him to utilize powerful qi punches strong enough to damage Debo Monsters and incapacitate Deboth's generals. As Kyoryu Silver, he can perform the Secret Technique: Sky Tearing Punch (奥義・空烈パンチ, Ōgi Kūretsu Panchi) attack.

Dantetsu Kiryu is portrayed by Shinji Yamashita (山下 真司, Yamashita Shinji).

=== Neo-Deboth Army ===
The Neo-Deboth Army (ネオデーボス軍, Neo Debōsu-gun) is the successor to the present day Deboth Army following the latter's destruction at the hands of the original Kyoryugers. One hundred million years prior, the Zyudenryu banished the Neo-Deboth Army to space. As of the events of the Korean sequel series Zyuden Sentai Kyoryuger Brave, they return to Earth via a spaceship powered by space dinosaurs in a renewed attempt to conquer Earth and seek out the Power of the 'Saur King (竜の王の力, Ryū no Ō no Chikara).

==== Deizarus ====
Deizarus (デイザルス, Deizarusu) is the fossil-themed leader of the Neo-Deboth Army. In addition to seeking the Power of the 'Saur King to become a destroyer of worlds, he bears a personal vendetta against the Zyudenryu, who drove him from Earth in a humiliating manner. He initially assumes Juhyeok is his quarry until he learns Kwon Juyong is the true 'Saur King and abducts him to siphon his power for himself. After Juhyeok foils the absorption process and saves Juyong, Deizarus enlarges and assumes his Battlize Form (バトライズ形態, Batoraizu Keitai) by converting his spaceship into exo-armor in an attempt to capture the brothers before he is destroyed by Brave Raiden Kyoryuzin.

Deizarus is voiced by Kenyu Horiuchi (堀内 賢雄, Horiuchi Ken'yū).

==== Raimein ====
Raimein (ライメイン), (Note: Raimein's name comes from the Japanese word raimei (雷鳴, thunder).) also known as the Demon King of Lightning (雷の魔王, Kaminari no Maō), is an unscrupulous oni/substation-themed member of the Neo-Deboth Army who believes in winning at all costs. Similar to Dogold, he wields a seven-branched sword and holds Juhyeok in contempt. Raimein is destroyed by Brave Kyoryu Gold.

Raimein is voiced by Daichi Hayashi (林 大地, Hayashi Daichi).

==== Homuras ====
Homuras (ホムラス, Homurasu), (Note: Homuras' name comes from the Japanese word homura (焔, fire).) also known as the Demon King of Flame (炎の魔王, Honō no Maō), is a sadistic lighter-themed member of the Neo-Deboth Army. Similar to Endolf, he wields a sword whose hilt can be used as a makeshift pistol. During Deizarus' endgame, Homuras battles the Kyoryuger Brave before willingly becoming a sacrificial distraction while fighting Brave Gigant Kyoryuzin.

Homuras is voiced by Tetsu Inada (稲田 徹, Inada Tetsu).

==== Wahab ====
Wahab (ウェイハブ, Weihabu), (Note: Wahab's name is a portmanteau of the word "wave" (ウェイブ, Weibu) and Ahab.) also known as the Demon King of Water (水の魔王, Mizu no Maō), is a hand pump-themed member of the Neo-Deboth Army and Deizarus' most loyal follower. Similar to Aigallon, he wields a battle axe. Wahab is destroyed by Juhyeok when the former learns the latter's secret and attempts to tell Deizarus.

Wahab is voiced by Soichi Abe (あべ そういち, Abe Sōichi).

==== Tsuraira ====
Tsuraira (ツライラ), (Note: Tsuraira's name comes from the Japanese word tsurara (氷柱, icicle).) also known as the Demon King of Ice (氷の魔王, Kōri no Maō), is a kakigōri maker-themed member of the Neo-Deboth Army who wields a rapier similar to Icelond. Tsuraira enlarges before he is destroyed by Brave Raiden Kyoryuzin.

Tsuraira is voiced by Kazuki Watanabe (渡辺 和貴, Watanabe Kazuki).

==== Arash ====
Arash (アラッシュ, Arasshu), (Note: Arash's name comes from the Japanese word arashi (嵐, storm).) also known as the Demon King of Wind (風の魔王, Kaze no Maō), is a fan-themed member of the Neo-Deboth Army and the cruelest and most fearless of Deizarus' generals. Similar to Killborero, Arash wields a trumpet-like gun. He enlarges before he is destroyed by Brave Gigant Kyoryuzin.

Arash is voiced by Daigo Fujimaki (藤巻 大悟, Fujimaki Daigo).

==== Jinarik ====
Jinarik (ジナリック, Jinarikku), (Note: Jinarik's name comes from the Japanese word jinari (地鳴り, seismic).) also known as the Demon King of Earth (土の魔王, Tsuchi no Maō), is a tire-themed member of the Neo-Deboth Army who wields a sword, possesses the ability to reconstruct his body even if he is destroyed, and is capable of sealing and controlling Zyudenryu. He attacks and brainwashes Giga Bragigas until Torin eventually frees the latter. Jinarik enlarges before he is destroyed by Brave Gigant BragiOh.

Jinarik is voiced by Syuichi Nishitani (西谷 修一, Nishitani Shūichi).

==== Bojinma ====
The Bojinma (ボージン魔, Bōjinma) are a quartet of Four Symbols-themed giant robots utilized by the Neo-Deboth Army to fight the Kyoryuger Brave's Zyudenryu. (Note: The Bojinma's name is an anagram of the kanji for Mahō-jin (魔法陣, magic circle).)

- Byaku Bojinma (ビャクボージン魔, Byaku Bōjinma): The first model to be deployed that utilizes hand-to-hand combat in battle. It assists Homuras in his rampage on Earth before it is destroyed by Brave Kyoryuzin.
- Sei Bojinma (セイボージン魔, Sei Bōjinma): The second model to be deployed that possesses a left forearm-mounted Gatling gun. Arash deploys it to cover his escape from the Kyoryuger Brave following his defeat before it is destroyed by Brave Kyoryuzin Western.
- Suza Bojinma (スザボージン魔, Suza Bōjinma): The third model to be deployed that possesses a right forearm-mounted lance. Wahab deploys it after he and Tsuraira fail to intercept the Kyoryuger Brave before it is destroyed by Brave Kyoryuzin.
- Gen Bojinma (ゲンボージン魔, Gen Bōjinma): The fourth model to be deployed after Brave Kyoryu Gold betrays Homuras and Raimein. This model wields the Sei and Suza Bojinma's Gatling gun and lance respectively. It is destroyed by Brave Raiden Kyoryuzin.

== Guest characters ==
- Rika Fukui (福井 理香, Fukui Rika): Yuko Fukui's daughter and Nobuharu's headstrong niece, the latter of whom she affectionately refers to as "Uncle Nobu" (ノブおじちゃん, Nobu-ojichan). After she was injured during an attack by the Deboth Army prior to the series, despite Kyoryu Blue's best efforts to protect her and her mother, Rika sees Kyoryu Blue as a hero as opposed to her mother. Rika later learns of her uncle's heroic identity and takes pride in being Kyoryu Blue's niece, though she keeps Nobuharu's identity a secret from her mother. Rika Fukui is portrayed by Nanami Tsunamoto (綱本 菜々美, Tsunamoto Nanami).
- Yuko Fukui (福井 優子, Fukui Yūko): Nobuharu's younger sister who possesses similar strength as her brother. A single mother to her daughter, Rika, she was widowed when her husband, Kenichi (賢一, Ken'ichi), died four years prior to the series. Yuko initially believes both the Kyoryugers and the Deboth Army are dangerous after Rika was injured during one of the latter group's attacks and she witnessed Kyoryu Blue seemingly attacking her. Over time, her opinion on the Kyoryugers softens. After she deduces that Nobuharu is Kyoryu Blue, she accepts it and keeps it a secret from him until she becomes the new Kyoryu Cyan. Yuko Fukui is portrayed by Ayumi Kinoshita (木下 あゆ美, Kinoshita Ayumi).
- "Gentle" (ジェントル, Jentoru): A title given to the Yuuzuki family's butlers. The current Gentle works to accommodate all of Amy's needs while she lives in Japan, exhorting her to always behave like an elegant and graceful young lady despite her headstrong personality. While Gentle is initially taken aback by Amy single-handedly defeating a group of Zorima and learning she is a Kyoryuger, he agrees to keep it a secret from her parents. Gentle is portrayed by Kentaro Shimazu (島津 健太郎, Shimazu Kentarō).
- Genryu Rippukan (立風館 源流, Rippūkan Genryū): Souji's strict father and the current head of the Rippukan House who wants his son to follow in his footsteps. Due to this strictness, Genryu was divorced by his wife Reiko while Souji stayed by his side after seeing him break down into tears. Though he originally fears Souji was deviating from their Musouken style to an unorthodox feral fighting style, Genryu learns his son incorporated aspects of their kenjutsu and praised him for his ingenious technique, inspiring him to create and apply new ways for their kenjutsu's future. Genryu Rippukan is portrayed by Jyunichi Haruta (春田 純一, Haruta Jun'ichi).
- Shiro Mifune (御船 士郎, Mifune Shirō): A treasure hunter and Ian's best friend. While on an expedition in Europe to find a mysterious stone prior to the series, Shiro was ambushed and killed by Aigallon for the stone following the Deboth Army's reawakening. Shiro Mifune is portrayed by Kenji Ebisawa (海老澤 健次, Ebisawa Kenji).
- Lord Iwaizumi Mōshinosuke (岩泉 猛志ノ介): Utsusemimaru's master who fought the Deboth Army alongside him during the Sengoku period. Lord Iwaizumi Mōshinosuke is portrayed by Ryo Ryusei, who also portrays Daigo.
- Rin Katsuyama (勝山 凛, Katsuyama Rin): The kendo club manager at Souji's high school who harbors an unrequited crush on him. As of the V-Cinema special Zyuden Sentai Kyoryuger Returns: 100 Years After, Katsuyama married Souji, died, and is survived through their descendant, Soujirou. Rin Katsuyama is portrayed by Reika Fujisawa (藤沢 玲花, Fujisawa Reika).
- Mikoto Amano (天野 美琴, Amano Mikoto): A popular idol known as "Meeko", an acquaintance of Daigo's, and the descendant of an ancient priestess who used her singing to free the powerful Zyudenryu Tobaspino from the Deboth Army's control. First appearing in the film Zyuden Sentai Kyoryuger: Gaburincho of Music, Deboth Army member D kidnaps her because she had inherited her ancestor's ability and forces her to help him regain control of Tobaspino. However, Mikoto is able to resist and help the Kyoryugers purify Tobaspino before entrusting them with the Zyudenryu's Zyudenchi. In episode 39 of the series, Mikoto returns to Japan after another tour to seemingly meet with Daigo, but she has fallen under D's control, who intends to use her to create an undead army and exact his revenge. Daigo however, manages to get through to her so she can help him defeat D. Mikoto Amano is portrayed by Shizuka Nakamura (中村 静香, Nakamura Shizuka).
- Shinya Tsukouchi (津古内 真也, Tsukouchi Shin'ya): A kindly young manga author and Tessai's descendant who writes Amy's favorite manga series under the female alias Yuu Aoyagi (青柳 ゆう, Aoyagi Yū) to help people feel better about themselves. He comes into contact with the Kyoryugers after requesting Amy's help in posing as his pen name to give a terminally ill fan his autograph, which Tessai resents, believing his descendant is being dishonest. After seeing Tsukouchi save a woman from the Deboth Army using his fighting style and learning the author's reasoning for writing manga however, Tessai sees him in a new light and later appoints Tsukouchi as the new Kyoryu Gray. Shinya Tsukouchi is portrayed by Masayuki Deai, who also portrays Tessai.
- Reiko Tanba (丹波 麗子, Tanba Reiko): A wealthy fashion designer, Souji's mother, and Genryu's ex-wife. After divorcing Genryu sometime prior to the series, she returns in the present to take Souji under her wing against his will until Torin intervenes and Souji drives off an attack by the Deboth Army, both of which convince Reiko to accept her son's choices and make peace with Genryu. Reiko Tanba is portrayed by Sayoko Hagiwara (萩原 佐代子, Hagiwara Sayoko).

== Spin-off characters ==
- Dino Girls (ディノガールズ, Dino Gāruzu): Two human-like warriors named Lemnear (レムネア, Remunea) and Earthy (アーシー, Āshī) who serve D until they are killed by Kyoryu Black and Kyoryu Pink. They appear exclusively in the film Zyuden Sentai Kyoryuger: Gaburincho of Music. Lemnear and Earthy are portrayed by Misaki Momose (桃瀬 美咲, Momose Misaki) and Minami Tsukui (佃井 皆美, Tsukui Minami) respectively.
- Giant Space Dinosaur Voldos (宇宙大恐竜ボルドス, Uchū Dai Kyōryū Borudosu): An evil entity similar to Deboth who was created from the combined hatred of the Zyurangers and Abarangers' enemies, the Dezumozorlya and Great Satan respectively, to destroy all dinosaur-themed Super Sentai groups during the events of the crossover film Zyuden Sentai Kyoryuger vs. Go-Busters: The Great Dinosaur Battle! Farewell Our Eternal Friends. To assist him in his endeavors, he creates Neo-Geilton and Neo-Grifforzar, revives and joins forces with Vaglass, and corrupts AbaRed and Tyranno Ranger to harness the power of Dino Hope to complete his evolution. Voldos also corrupts the Kyoryugers and sends them back in time to destroy their Zyudenryu partners' past selves, but they, AbaRed, and Tyranno Ranger eventually break free and join forces with the other Zyurangers and Abarangers as well as the Go-Busters to defeat the space dinosaur's forces and Voldos himself. Voldos is voiced by Takuma Terashima (寺島 拓篤, Terashima Takuma).
  - Neo-Geilton (ネオガイルトン, Neo Gairuton): A servant of Voldos created from the residual hatred of the Dezumozorlya's Evoliens in the image of their Geilton armor who wields the Dark Silver Axe (暗黒の銀斧, Ankoku no Ginfu) and Dark Armor Shield (暗黒の鎧盾, Ankoku no Gaishun) like his template. After being defeated by the Abarangers, Neo-Geilton uses Vaglass' data to transform into Neo-Messiah (ネオメサイア, Neo Mesaia), only to be destroyed by the ToQgers before he could use his new power. Neo-Geilton is also voiced by Takuma Terashima.
  - Neo-Grifforzar (ネオグリフォーザー, Neo Gurifōzā): A servant of Voldos created from the residual hatred of Great Satan's Bandora Gang in the image of their knight Grifforzar who wields the Grifforcalibur V (グリフォカリバー5世, Gurifokaribā Gosei) and can enlarge himself using Witch Bandora's DoraSceptre like his template. After being defeated by the Zyurangers, he absorbs energy from the dinosaur Sentai teams' combined attacks and uses it to complete Voldos' evolution, sacrificing himself in the process. Neo-Grifforzar is voiced by Hiroki Yasumoto (安元 洋貴, Yasumoto Hiroki).
- Creator Devius (創造主デビウス, Sōzōshu Debiusu): A Wicked Witch of the West/moth-themed alien who wields the Magicana Wand (マジカナ・ワンド, Majikana Wando) who created Deboth ages prior and appears exclusively in the crossover film Ressha Sentai ToQger vs. Kyoryuger: The Movie. After siphoning a Galaxy Line station's energy to assume a physical form, he attacks the Kyoryugers and ToQgers, but is defeated by ToQ 1gou. Devius enlarges, only to be destroyed by the ToQgers, Kyoryugers, and the Shadow Line's leaders. Devius is voiced by Masaki Terasoma (てらそま まさき, Terasoma Masaki).
  - Crimson High Priest Salamazu (紅蓮神官サラマズ, Guren Shinkan Saramazu): One of Devius' minions who wields the PromiLance (プロミランス, Puromiransu) and appears exclusively in ToQger vs. Kyoryuger. He arranges an alliance with the Shadow Line on Devius' behalf before using the former for their energy and absorbing several of their monsters to transform into Salamazu Ultimate (サラマズ究極態, Saramazu Kyūkyokutai). Despite this, he is destroyed by ToQ Rainbow and Gigant Kyoryuzin. Salamazu is voiced by Hiroyuki Amano (天野 ひろゆき, Amano Hiroyuki).
- 2114 Kyoryugers: The original Kyoryugers' descendants who Canderrilla and Luckyulo recruit in the year 2114 to combat the revived Deboth Army and appear exclusively in the V-Cinema special Zyuden Sentai Kyoryuger Returns: 100 Years After. Due to Arslevan's temporal abilities, the pair accidentally give most of the new Kyoryugers the wrong Zyudenchi, though they eventually realize the mistake and assume their ancestral predecessors' original roles.
  - Dai-kun (ダイくん): Daigo and Amy's great-grandson who initially lacked self-confidence and became Kyoryu Navy (キョウリュウネイビー, Kyōryū Neibī) with the Tobaspino Zyudenchi. After meeting Minityra and Torin's spirit, Dai-kun eventually finds his Brave and becomes the new Kyoryu Red. Dai-kun is portrayed by Ryo Ryusei, who also portrays Daigo.
  - Icchan (イッちゃん, Itchan): Ian's descendant and a womanizing musician who initially becomes the new Kyoryu Silver before becoming Kyoryu Black. Icchan is portrayed by Syuusuke Saito, who also portrays Ian.
  - Nobuta-san (ノブ太さん): Nobuharu's descendant and Rika's grandson from the Tōhoku region's countryside who becomes the new Kyoryu Blue. Nobuta-san is portrayed by Yamato Kinjo, who also portrays Nobuharu.
  - Soujirou (ソウジロウ, Sōjirō): Souji and Rin Katsuyama's impatient great-grandson who initially becomes the new Kyoryu Gray before becoming Kyoryu Green and inheriting the Feather Edge. Soujirou is portrayed by Akihisa Shiono, who also portrays Souji.
  - Big Sister Ami (アミねえさん, Ami Neesan): Daigo and Amy's straightforward and gutsy great-granddaughter and Dai-kun's older sister who initially becomes the new Kyoryu Cyan before becoming Kyoryu Pink. Ami is portrayed by Ayuri Konno, who also portrays Amy.
  - Uppie (ウッピー, Uppī): Real name Umanosuke Iwaizumi (岩泉 馬ノ介, Iwaizumi Umanosuke), he is Utsusemimaru's descendant who became a flashy pro-bowler following the bowling boom of 2114. He initially becomes the new Kyoryu Violet before becoming Kyoryu Gold. Uppie is portrayed by Atsushi Maruyama, who also portrays Utsusemimaru.
- 2114 Deboth Army: A faction of the original Deboth Army who Arslevan created and absorbed as part of his revenge plan, though they outlive their creator and become enemies of the 2114 Kyoryugers.
  - Thousand-Faced High Priest Gaos (千面神官ガオス, Senmen Shinkan Gaosu): The flippant and ignorant figurehead leader who resembles Kaos and was manipulated by Arslevan into believing he was him. Gaos is voiced by Takayuki Sugō, who also voices Kaos.
  - Sniveling Knight Sneld (卑屈の戦騎スネルド, Hikutsu no Senki Sunerudo): A monster who resembles Dogold, but is prone to complaining and whining, and wields the Shichiten Battō (七転八刀; Seven-Turn Eight Sword), which appears identical to Dogold's Kenka Jōtō. Sneld is voiced by Satoshi Tsuruoka, who also voices Dogold.
  - Jealous Knight Hoshiigallon (嫉妬の戦騎ホシイガロン, Shitto no Senki Hoshiigaron): A monster who resembles Aigallon, but is prone to incessantly expressing envy towards everyone. Hoshiigallon is voiced by Yū Mizushima, who also voices Aigallon.
- Remorseful Knight Arslevan (後悔の戦騎アースレバン, Kōkai no Senki Āsureban): A China Princess-themed Deboth Knight born from Deboth's regret amidst his final destruction who wields the Arslevayo Cutter (アースレバヨ・カッター, Āsurebayo Kattā) sword and appears exclusively in the V-Cinema special Zyuden Sentai Kyoryuger Returns: 100 Years After. Arslevan hid himself away between dimensions for 100 years to rebuild the Deboth Army and used his temporal abilities to tamper with the world's memories of the Kyoryugers. Emerging in 2114, he manipulates his creation Gaos into believing the latter was the reincarnated Kaos and pretends to serve under him while the former amasses humans' negative emotional energy. Once he absorbs his followers to finish doing so, Arslevan travels back in time to prevent Deboth's defeat, only to be blasted back to 2114 by the present day Kyoryugers and killed by their descendants. Arslevan is voiced by Showtaro Morikubo (森久保 祥太郎, Morikubo Shōtarō).
