= Zyuden Sentai Kyoryuger: Gaburincho of Music =

- Dual film poster for Kamen Rider Wizard in Magic Land and Zyuden Sentai Kyoryuger: Gaburincho of Music

Japanese name
- Kanji: 劇場版 獣電戦隊キョウリュウジャー GABURINCHO OF MUSIC
Transcriptions
- Revised Hepburn: Gekijōban Jūden Sentai Kyōryūjā Gaburincho Obu Myūjikku
- Directed by: Koichi Sakamoto
- Written by: Riku Sanjo
- Based on: Zyuden Sentai Kyoryuger by Saburo Yatsude
- Starring: Ryo Ryusei; Syuusuke Saito; Yamato Kinjo; Akihisa Shiono; Ayuri Konno; Atsushi Maruyama
- Narrated by: Shigeru Chiba
- Music by: Toshihiko Sahashi
- Production company: Toei
- Release date: August 3, 2013
- Running time: 30 minutes
- Country: Japan
- Language: Japanese

Zyuden Sentai Kyoryuger the Movie: Gaburincho of Music (劇場版 獣電戦隊キョウリュウジャー GABURINCHO OF MUSIC, Gekijōban Jūden Sentai Kyōryūjā Gaburincho Obu Myūjikku) is a 2013 film adaptation of the Japanese Super Sentai television series Zyuden Sentai Kyoryuger. It was released on August 3, 2013, as a double-bill with the Kamen Rider Series film Kamen Rider Wizard in Magic Land. The film guest stars gravure idol Shizuka Nakamura as a supporting role. Gaburincho of Music is a musical.

== Story ==
The Kyoryugers attend the show by pop star Meeko, a girl from Daigo's past. But when a group of Zorima led by two girls raids the area, the Kyoryugers hold off the Dino Girls while Kyoryu Red gets Meeko to safety. However, as the latter she lost her pendant, Daigo and Meeko encounter a former Deboth Army member named D who gained the power to become Deathryuger while confirming the girl to be the one he is looking for. Even with the Kyoryugers gathered, Deathryuger overpowers them all before taking Meeko. The Kyoryugers learn from Torin that D seeks to revive the first Zyudenryu Tobaspino before they are alerted to Tobaspino's reawakening with their Zyudenryu powerless. Though Ankydon and Bunpachy attempt to help, they end up being forcefully merged with Tobaspino to create SpinoDaiOh which proceeds to ready the Great Eradication Blast. As the others make their way to him, Utsusemimaru halts Deathryuger's preparations with Pteraigordon. When asked why they would, the Kyoryugers start before they transform and proceed to fight D's forces. After a motorcycle duel, a wounded Deathryuger retreats into Tobaspino as Raiden Kyoryuzin is formed and manages to make a dent. However, after he infiltrates SpinoDaiOh, Daigo is beaten to a bloody pulp by D after he discards his Deathryuger helmet. However, seeing the pendant Daigo brought with him, Meeko sings 'Dino Soul' which restores SpinoDaiOh's mind as it acts to stop the Eradication Blast. With the Gaburu Armed On Gabutyra Zyudenchi, Kyoryu Red uses two Gabutyra Fangs to knock D out of SpinoDaiOh with the villain falling his death. Saved by Raiden Kyoryuzin, the others convince him not to give up as they join Meeko's singing to purify SpinoDaiOh as they destroy the Eradication Blast. Entrusted with the Tobaspino Zyudenchi, Meeko while the Kyoryugers get a backstage pass while Topaspino returns to its resting place.

== Cast ==
- Daigo Kiryu (桐生 ダイゴ, Kiryū Daigo): Ryo Ryusei (竜星 涼, Ryūsei Ryō)
- Ian Yorkland (イアン・ヨークランド, Ian Yōkurando): Syuusuke Saito (斉藤 秀翼, Saitō Shūsuke)
- Nobuharu Udo (有働 ノブハル, Udō Nobuharu): Yamato Kinjo (金城 大和, Kinjō Yamato)
- Souji Rippukan (立風館 ソウジ, Rippūkan Sōji): Akihisa Shiono (塩野 瑛久, Shiono Akihisa)
- Amy Yuuzuki (アミィ結月, Amyi Yūzuki): Ayuri Konno (今野 鮎莉, Konno Ayuri)
- Utsusemimaru (空蝉丸): Atsushi Maruyama (丸山 敦史, Maruyama Atsushi)
- Wise God Torin (賢神トリン, Kenjin Torin; Voice): Toshiyuki Morikawa (森川 智之, Morikawa Toshiyuki)
- Many-Faced High Priest Kaos (百面神官カオス, Hyakumen Shinkan Kaosu; Voice): Takayuki Sugō (菅生 隆之, Sugō Takayuki)
- Joyful Knight Canderrilla (喜びの戦騎キャンデリラ, Yorokobi no Senki Kyanderira; Voice): Haruka Tomatsu (戸松 遥, Tomatsu Haruka)
- Raging Knight Dogold (怒りの戦騎ドゴルド, Ikari no Senki Dogorudo; Voice): Satoshi Tsuruoka (鶴岡 聡, Tsuruoka Satoshi)
- Sorrowful Knight Aigallon (哀しみの戦騎アイガロン, Kanashimi no Senki Aigaron; Voice): Yū Mizushima (水島 裕, Mizushima Yū)
- Funfilled Spy Luckyulo (楽しみの密偵ラッキューロ, Tanoshimi no Mittei Rakkyūro; Voice): Ai Orikasa (折笠 愛, Orikasa Ai)
- Mikoto Amano (Meeko) (天野 美琴（Meeko）, Amano Mikoto (Mīko)): Shizuka Nakamura (中村 静香, Nakamura Shizuka)
- Lemnear (レムネア, Remunea): Misaki Momose (桃瀬 美咲, Momose Misaki)
- Earthy (アーシー, Āshī): Minami Tsukui (佃井 皆美, Tsukui Minami)
- Ferocious Knight D (獰猛の戦騎D, Dōmō no Senki Dī; Voice)/Deathryuger (デスリュウジャー, Desuryūjā; Voice): Mamoru Miyano (宮野 真守, Miyano Mamoru)
- Narration, Kyoryuger Equipment Voice: Shigeru Chiba (千葉 繁, Chiba Shigeru)

== Music ==
Gaburincho of Music is a musical and features various songs by the cast as well as other pieces from the series' soundtrack. A "song album" film theme song single were released on July 31, 2013.

Theme song

- "GABURINCHO OF MUSIC!"
  - Lyrics & Composition: Hideaki Takatori
  - Arrangement: Hiroaki Kagoshima
  - Artist: Hideaki Takatori, Showgo Kamata, & Kyoryugers

Insert songs

- "Vamola! Kyoryuger (Samba Mix)" (VAMOLA! キョウリュウジャー(Samba Mix), Bamōra! Kyōryūjā (Sanba Mikkusu))
  - Lyrics: Shoko Fujibayashi
  - Composition: Yusuke Mochida
  - Arrangement: Kousuke Yamashita
  - Artist: Showgo Kamata
- "Dino Soul"
  - Lyrics: Riku Sanjo
  - Composition & Arrangement: Go Sakebe
  - Artist: Meeko (Shizuka Nakamura)
- "Kamitsuki Brave" (カミツキ・ブレイブ, Kamitsuki Bureibu)
  - Lyrics: Natsumi Tadano
  - Composition: Kei Haneoka
  - Arrangement: Seiki Sato
  - Artist: Daiki Ise
- "Senritsu to Senritsu ~D no Thema~" (戦慄と旋律～Dのテーマ～, Senritsu to Senritsu ~Dī no Tēma~; "Horror and Melody (D's Theme)")
  - Lyrics: Natsumi Tadano
  - Composition & Arrangement: Go Sakebe
  - Artist: Kimeru
- "Kokoro no Sukima World" (ココロの隙間ワールド, Kokoro no Sukima Wārudo; "The Heart's Gap World")
  - Lyrics: Natsumi Tadano
  - Composition & Arrangement: Go Sakebe
  - Artist: Canderrilla, Aigallon, Luckyulo (Haruka Tomatsu, Yū Mizushima, Ai Orikasa)
- "Dino Soul (Ancient Version)" (Dino Soul(古代ver.), Daino Sōru (Kodai Bājon))
  - Lyrics: Riku Sanjo
  - Composition & Arrangement: Go Sakebe
  - Artist: Mikoto Amano (Shizuka Nakamura)
