= Makoto Okunaka =

Japanese actress and former singer (born 1993)

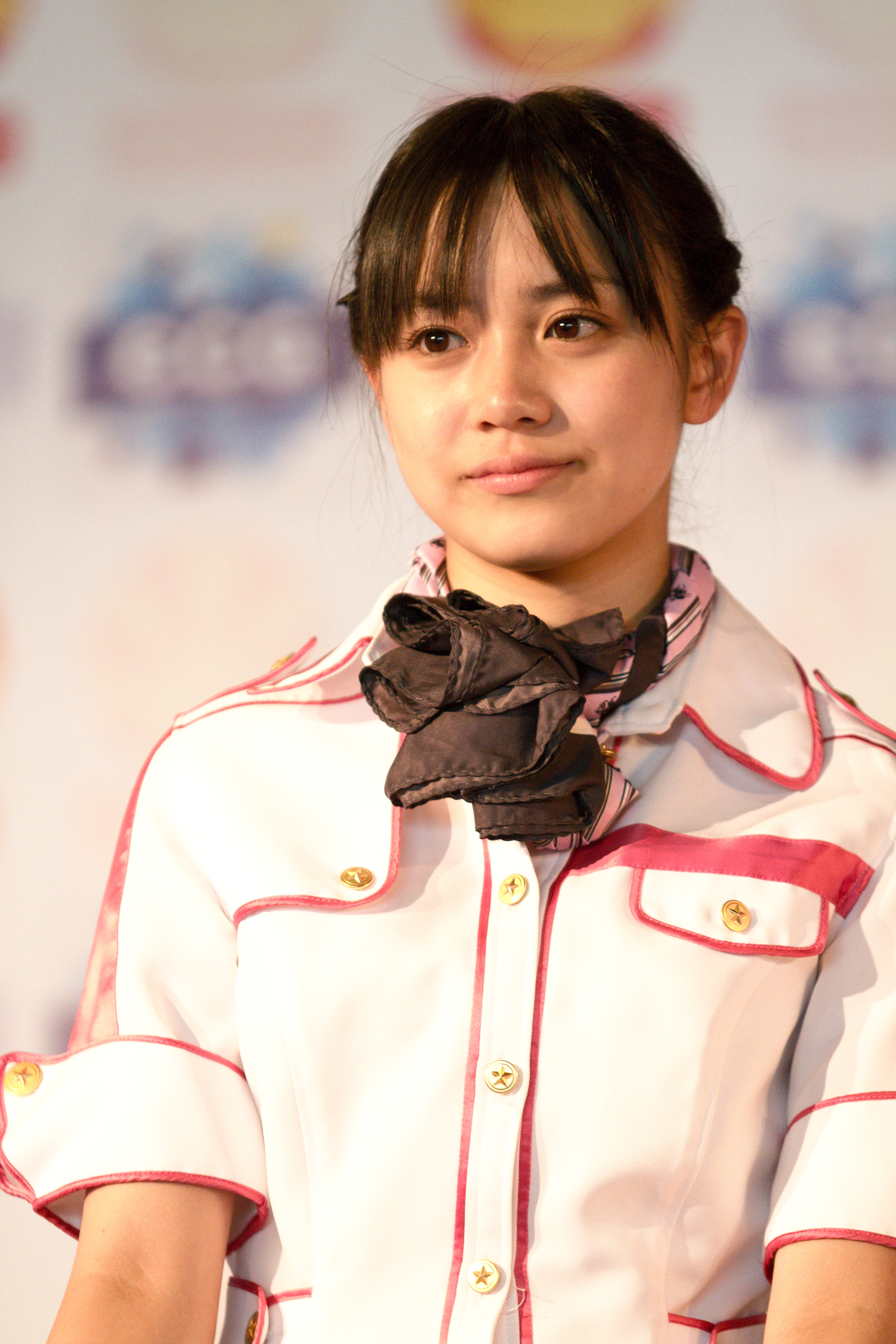
- Okunaka in 2011
- Born: November 18, 1993 (age 32)
- Occupations: Singer; dancer; actress
- Spouse: Unknown (m. 2024)
- Musical career
- Born: Saitama Prefecture, Japan
- Genres: J-pop
- Years active: 2009–present
- Labels: Jolly Roger (2010); Universal J (Universal) (2011–present)
- Formerly of: Passpo
- Website: passpo.jp

Makoto Okunaka (奥仲 麻琴, Okunaka Makoto), nicknamed Makocchan (まこっちゃん), is a former member of the Japanese idol group Passpo. Her official color was pink.

== Career ==
Okunaka released a photobook "Run Run Makoto" in 2011. She starred as the female lead Koyomi in Kamen Rider Wizard, which aired from 2012 to 2013. Her second photobook "Kawaikute Makoto ni Suimasen!" was released April 15, 2013. Lastly in "Good bye my life", her third photobook, she tries show us a mature side of herself. It was shot in Bali and released on Valentine's Day 2014.

On September 28, 2014, at Shinjuku BLAZE, Makochan announced graduation from the group, meaning she would leave PASSPO. Her last "flight" (show) took place at Tokyo Dome City Hall, on January 1, 2015.

She would later appear in Kamen Rider Ghost as Honami, the leader of a fictional idol group called Harp+y 4.

== Personal life ==
On May 21, 2024, Okunaka announced on her Twitter account that she was married to a man who wasn't part of the entertainment industry.

== Filmography ==
=== Television ===
Year	Title	Role	Other notes
2012	Kamen Rider Wizard	Koyomi	Main role
2016	Kamen Rider Ghost	Honami	Episodes 36 and 37
2021	Momoiro Anzuiro Sakurairo	Anzu Kawakami	Main role

=== Film ===
Year	Title	Role	Other notes
2012	Kamen Rider × Kamen Rider Wizard & Fourze: Movie War Ultimatum	Koyomi	Main role
2013	Kamen Rider × Super Sentai × Space Sheriff: Super Hero Taisen Z	Koyomi	Main role
2013	Kamen Rider Wizard in Magic Land	Koyomi	Main role
2013	Kamen Rider × Kamen Rider Gaim & Wizard: The Fateful Sengoku Movie Battle	Koyomi/White Wizard	Main role
2017	Sagrada Reset: Part 1		
2017	Sagrada Reset: Part 2		
2017	Make a Bow and Kiss		
