= Kamen Rider Wizard in Magic Land =

- Dual film poster for Kamen Rider Wizard in Magic Land and Zyuden Sentai Kyoryuger: Gaburincho of Music

Japanese name
- Kanji: 劇場版 仮面ライダーウィザード in Magic Land
Transcriptions
- Revised Hepburn: Gekijōban Kamen Raidā Wizādo In Majikku Rando
- Directed by: Shojiro Nakazawa
- Written by: Junko Kōmura
- Based on: Kamen Rider Wizard by Tsuyoshi Kida
- Produced by: Ishimori Productions; Toei
- Starring: Shunya Shiraishi; Makoto Okunaka; Junki Tozuka; Yuko Takayama; Tasuku Nagase
- Cinematography: Koji Kurata
- Edited by: Hiroshi Sunaga
- Music by: Kōtarō Nakagawa
- Production company: Toei
- Distributed by: Toei Co. Ltd
- Release date: August 3, 2013
- Running time: 62 minutes
- Country: Japan
- Language: Japanese
- Box office: US$12 million (Japan)

Kamen Rider Wizard in Magic Land (劇場版 仮面ライダーウィザード in Magic Land, Gekijōban Kamen Raidā Wizādo In Majikku Rando) is the 2013 film adaptation of the 2012 & 2013 Kamen Rider Series television series Kamen Rider Wizard. It was released on August 3, 2013, as a double-bill with Zyuden Sentai Kyoryuger: Gaburincho of Music. The film features Takanori Jinnai as Minister Auma who transforms into Kamen Rider Sorcerer. Jinnai is the oldest person to portray a Kamen Rider to date at age 54; the record was previously held by Hiroyuki Watanabe for his portrayal of Kamen Rider Gaoh in Kamen Rider Den-O: I'm Born! who at the time of filming was 51.

== Story ==
Haruto(Kamen Rider Wizard) confront a mysterious Golden Magician who abducted Koyomi to perform a ritual. They fail to stop it, and the Magician uses the Create Ring to summon a rainbow tornado that engulfs everything around them. Haruto and Koyomi wake up the next day and find themselves in a different world where magic is commonplace. They find Shunpei and learn that he does not recognize them.

Haruto learns that citizens' mana is used as currency. Alongside other citizens, Rinko defeats an army of Ghouls without the help of Haruto. Rinko doesn't recognize the two and arrests them. He brings them to Emperor Maya, who lets them go after learning that Koyomi is incapable of using magic. Afterward, they search for the Golden Magician but instead find Kosuke Nitou, who reveals that he uses a handmade Beast Driver that does not need to consume Phantoms to sustain itself.

Haruto and Koyomi stumble across a Magic Ring Shop (a counterpart of Okagedomo Antique Shop). Wajima introduces them to his worker, Shiina, and he offers them shelter. Shiina runs away after being told their situation, and Wajima reveals that Shiina's mother, among others, was taken away by a giant rainbow tornado. Elsewhere, Shiina watches as the Golden Magician engulfs a group of dancers in a rainbow tornado and chases him. He is led to a group of alternate counterparts of Phantom Generals, and he begins to fight them. Haruto and Koyomi find Shiina and save him from the Phantoms.

Shiina awakens and tells them that he saw the Golden Magician retreat to Maya's castle. Haruto and Kosuke sneak into the castle and discover that the Emperor is using a machine, which contains the corpse of Shiina's mother, to drain the citizens' mana. The duo is discovered, and Sorcerer appears and attacks them. They transform, and Beast helps Wizard escape to expose the Emperor's plot. Sorcerer overpowers Beast and vanquishes him. Shiina returns to the shop and discovers that he can no longer use magic, which Koyomi tells him is the result of Haruto's actions to save him. Haruto is unable to convince the citizens of Emperor Maya's plan, as he has already made propaganda smearing Haruto.

Haruto escapes a group of guards who try to capture him and returns to the castle. He gets overwhelmed by the guards but is saved by Kosuke, who survived Sorcerer's attack. Haruto enters Maya's chambers, and he reveals to Haruto that he is not a magician and activates the machine, draining the citizens' mana and causing them to suffer. Sorcerer enters the chamber and reveals himself to be the Golden Magician. Haruto removes the Common Ring from the Emperor and shatters it. The Magicians transform and fight each other. Wizard defeats Sorcerer, and Magic Land begins to vanish. Before returning to his world, Wizard tells Maya that they will meet again. Haruto and Koyomi wake up and confirm that they are in the correct world. They go to the park and see Maya with his family and Shiina with his mother.

== Cast ==
- Haruto Soma (操真 晴人, Sōma Haruto): Shunya Shiraishi (白石 隼也, Shiraishi Shun'ya)
- Koyomi (コヨミ): Makoto Okunaka (奥仲 麻琴, Okunaka Makoto)
- Kosuke Nito (仁藤 攻介, Nitō Kōsuke): Tasuku Nagase (永瀬 匡, Nagase Tasuku)
- Shunpei Nara (奈良 瞬平, Nara Shunpei): Junki Tozuka (戸塚 純貴, Tozuka Junki)
- Rinko Daimon (大門 凛子, Daimon Rinko): Yuko Takayama (高山 侑子, Takayama Yūko)
- Misa (Medusa) (ミサ（メデューサ）, Misa (Medyūsa)): Erina Nakayama (中山 絵梨奈, Nakayama Erina)
- Yugo (Phoenix) (ユウゴ（フェニックス）, Yūgo (Fenikkusu)): Atsumi (篤海)
- Sora (Gremlin) (ソラ（グレムリン）, Sora (Guremurin)): Takahisa Maeyama (前山 剛久, Maeyama Takahisa)
- Manager of donut shop: Kaba-chan (KABA.ちゃん)
- Worker at donut shop: Ryo Tayano (田谷野 亮, Tayano Ryō)
- Shigeru Wajima (輪島 繁, Wajima Shigeru): Hisahiro Ogura (小倉 久寛, Ogura Hisahiro)
- Shiina (シイナ): Tsubasa Takizawa (瀧澤 翼, Takizawa Tsubasa)
- Captain of the Imperial Guards: Ryuji Sainei (載寧 龍二, Sainei Ryūji)
- Emperor Maya (マヤ大王, Maya-daiō): Shugo Oshinari (忍成 修吾, Oshinari Shūgo)
- Minister Auma (オーマ大臣, Ōma-daijin): Takanori Jinnai (陣内 孝則, Jinnai Takanori)
- Youths: Kamen Rider Girls
- Maya's father: Makoto Kitami (北見 誠, Kitami Makoto)
- Young Maya: Mizuki Sakurai (櫻井 海瑞希, Sakurai Mizuki)
- Shiina's mother: Sawa Masaki (正木 佐和, Masaki Sawa)
- Children: Kei Suzuki (鈴木 啓, Suzuki Kei), Ryu Suzuki (鈴木 琉生, Suzuki Ryū)
- Maya's wife: Eri Otoguro (乙黒 えり, Otoguro Eri)
- Khepri (ケプリ, Kepuri; Voice): Keiji Hirai (平井 啓二, Hirai Keiji)
- Speaking door (Voice): Ayano Fukuda (福田 彩乃, Fukuda Ayano)

== Theme song ==
- "The Finale Of The Finale"
  - Lyrics: Shoko Fujibayashi
  - Composition: Yoshio Nomura
  - Arrangement & Artist: Rider Chips

== Net movies ==
To promote the film, Toei is releasing a series of online shorts titled Kamen Rider Wizard in Magica Land (ネット版 仮面ライダーウィザード イン マジか!?ランド, Netto-ban Kamen Raidā Wizādo In Maji ka!? Rando; Maji ka!? (マジか!?) means "Really!?"), featuring several unbelievable stories. The "Kamen Rider Cops" (仮面ライダー刑事, Kamen Raidā Deka) films feature past Kamen Riders as part of Rinko's police force. The "Kamen Rider Mage" (仮面ライダーメイジ, Kamen Raidā Meiji) films feature Shunpei as the hero. The "Search for Magic Riders!" (魔法ライダーを探せ！, Mahō Raidā o Sagase!) looks at past mystically-themed Kamen Riders. The "Koyomi's Room: Premium" (コヨミの部屋・プレミアム, Koyomi no Heya Puremiamu) films show Koyomi's various interests outside of helping Haruto.

== Reception ==
The film grossed US$12 million in Japan.
