= Ayuri Konno =

Japanese actress

- 今野 鮎莉
- Born: January 10, 1997 (age 29); Tokyo, Japan
- Occupation: Actress
- Years active: 2012–2018,
- Height: 163 cm (5 ft 4 in)

Ayuri Konno (今野 鮎莉, Konno Ayuri; born January 10, 1997) is a former Japanese actress known for her role as Amy Yuuzuki/Kyoryu Pink in the 2013 Super Sentai series Zyuden Sentai Kyoryuger. In July 2018, she announced her retirement from acting to pursue an opportunity outside the entertainment industry.

== Biography ==
In 2012, she made her debut as an actress in the film Another.

In 2013, she made her television debut in the Super Sentai series Zyuden Sentai Kyoryuger as Amy Yuzuki/KyoryuPink.

From April 2014 to March 2016, she was a regular on Mezamashi TV as a Modern Girl.

On July 31, 2018, she announced on her blog that she was retiring from the entertainment industry.

She made a temporary return as a guest star in episodes 32 and 33 of Osama Sentai King Oger which aired in October 2023 , to celebrate the 10th anniversary of Kyoryuger. She also appeared in the V-Cinema Next series Osama Sentai King Oger VS Kyoryuger.

== Filmography ==
=== Film ===
- Another (2012)
- Tokumei Sentai Go-Busters vs. Kaizoku Sentai Gokaiger: The Movie (2013) as Kyoryu Pink (voice only)
- Kamen Rider × Super Sentai × Space Sheriff: Super Hero Taisen Z (2013) as Amy Yuuzuki/Kyoryu Pink
- Zyuden Sentai Kyoryuger: Gaburincho of Music (2013) as Amy Yuuzuki/Kyoryu Pink
- School Girl Complex (2013) as Mayu Nishino
- Zyuden Sentai Kyoryuger vs. Go-Busters: The Great Dinosaur Battle! Farewell Our Eternal Friends (2014) as Amy Yuuzuki/Kyoryu Pink
- We're the Bounty Hunter Troupe (2014) as Kaori Sakurakawa
- Love Manga Typhoon!! as Kumi Kawano (2014)
- Ressha Sentai ToQger vs. Kyoryuger: The Movie (2015) as Amy Yuuzuki/Kyoryu Pink
- Strobe Edge (2015)
- The Disastrous Life of Saiki K. (2017)
- Ohsama Sentai King-Ohger vs. Kyoryuger (2024) as Amy Yuuzuki/Kyoryu Pink

=== TV series ===
- Zyuden Sentai Kyoryuger (2013) as Amy Yuuzuki/Kyoryu Pink
- Yabai Kenji Yaba Ken 4 ~Yabaken no Bōsō Sōsa~ (2014) as Risa Asakawa
- Kaiki Renai Sakusen (2015) as Moeka
- Ushijima the Loan Shark (2016) as Miyuki Uehara
- Ohsama Sentai King-Ohger (2023) as Amy Yuuzuki/Kyoryu Pink

=== V-Cinema ===
- Zyuden Sentai Kyoryuger Returns: Hundred Years After (2014) as Amy Yuuzuki/Kyoryu Pink, Big Sister Ami/Kyoryu Cyan/Kyoryu Pink
- Nagashiya Teppei (2015) as Shizuku Inoue

=== Internet film ===
- Net Movie: Kamen Rider × Super Sentai × Space Sheriff: Super Hero Taisen Otsu!: Heroo! Answers (2013) as Amy Yuuzuki

=== Video ===
- Ayu to Thai (2013)
