= Syuusuke Saito =

Japanese actor and singer (born 1993)

- 斉藤 秀翼
- Saito at a press event for Kamen Rider Zi-O the Movie: Over Quartzer in 2019
- Born: March 1, 1993 (age 33); Kumamoto, Kumamoto Prefecture, Japan
- Occupations: Actor; singer
- Years active: 2009–present
- Agent: Sony Music Artists (2009–2020)
- Height: 178 cm (5 ft 10 in)

Syuusuke Saito (斉藤 秀翼, Saitō Shūsuke; born March 1, 1993 in Kumamoto, Kumamoto Prefecture) is a Japanese actor and singer who was affiliated with Sony Music Artists and graduated from Kyushugakuin High School. He played the role of Ian Yorkland (Kyoryu Black) in the 2013 Super Sentai TV series Zyuden Sentai Kyoryuger.

== Biography ==
In 2009, Saito passed an audition Hua Hua and music information program of Kumamotokenminterebi Rocket Complex is Sony Music Artists, an entertainment industry.

In 2010, he played as Hanabusa in Fumi Yoshinaga's film Ooku. In 2011, Saito appeared in the NHK Taiga Drama, Gō as Hashiba Hidekatsu. In September of the same year, he appeared in the BeeTV romantic comedy, Ren'ai taikan dorama `kaikan sutoroberī 〜 himi no Hanazono 〜' as Yukimizunoe Korisaki. In October of the same year, Saito made regular appearances as Takuya Ozawa as in the NTV drama, Kaseifu no Mita, starring Nanako Matsushima. In November of the same year, he appeared in the music information program of Kumamotokenminterebi Rocket Complex served as an MC.

In February 17, 2013, Saito appeared in Zyuden Sentai Kyoryuger as Ian Yorkland/Kyoryu Black.

In February 2015, his major debut from the mini album Party! from Nippon Columbia was scheduled.

In 2019, Saito appeared in Kamen Rider Zi-O the Movie: Over Quartzer as Jogen/Kamen Rider Zamonas.

== Filmography ==
=== TV series ===
Year	Title	Role	Network	Other notes
2011	Gō	Hashiba Hidekatsu	NHK	Taiga drama
2011	Kaseifu no Mita	Takuya Ozawa	NTV	
2012	Playgirl	Atsushi Yabe	Family Gekijo	
2012	Houkago wa Mystery Totomo ni	Tsubasa Kurahashi	TBS	
2013	Zyuden Sentai Kyoryuger	Ian Yorkland/Kyoryu Black	TV Asahi	
2015	Shiromajo Gakuen: Owari to Hajimari	Tera		
2018	Nakai Masahiro no Kinsma Special	Hideaki Takizawa	TBS	
2023	Ohsama Sentai King-Ohger	Ian Yorkland / KyouryuuBlack	TV Asahi	

=== Films ===
Year	Title	Role	Other notes
2013	Tokumei Sentai Go-Busters vs. Kaizoku Sentai Gokaiger: The Movie	Kyoryu Black (Voice)	
2013	Kamen Rider × Super Sentai × Space Sheriff: Super Hero Taisen Z	Ian Yorkland/Kyoryu Black	
2013	Zyuden Sentai Kyoryuger: Gaburincho of Music	Ian Yorkland/Kyoryu Black	
2014	Zyuden Sentai Kyoryuger vs. Go-Busters: The Great Dinosaur Battle! Farewell Our Eternal Friends	Ian Yorkland/Kyoryu Black	
2014	Kabadieen! Gekitotsu Dokuro Koko hen	Minami	
2014	We're the Bounty Hunter Troupe	Ken Kuroda	
2015	Ressha Sentai ToQger vs. Kyoryuger: The Movie	Ian Yorkland/Kyoryu Black	
2019	Kamen Rider Zi-O the Movie: Over Quartzer	Jogen/Kamen Rider Zamonas	
