= Shizuka Nakamura =

Japanese gravure idol and actress (born 1988)

- 中村 静香
- Born: September 9, 1988 (age 37); Uji, Kyoto, Japan
- Occupations: Gravure idol, actress
- Years active: 2004–present
- Agent: Oscar Promotion

Shizuka Nakamura (中村 静香, Nakamura Shizuka; born September 9, 1988, in Uji, Kyoto, Japan) is a Japanese gravure idol and actress who is represented by the talent agency Oscar Promotion. She was a member of Pretty Club 31 and Teenage Club. She play Seigi no Mikata as Kyoko Komatsu

== Filmography ==
=== TV series ===
Year	Title	Role	Notes	Ref.
2011	Yūsha Yoshihiko	Lien	Episode 6	
2014–25	Emergency Interrogation Room	Kayano	4 seasons	
2016	Kaitō Yamaneko	a mysterious woman		
2022	Fishbowl Wives	Yuka Shimura		
2024	Dear Radiance	Fujiwara no Nobuko	Taiga drama	

=== Films ===
Year	Title	Role	Notes	Ref.
2022	Tyida	Satomi Yoshioka		
2024	The Dancing Okami	Mai Hoshino		
2025	Emergency Interrogation Room: The Final Movie	Kayano		
2025	Grandpa!	Yuki Mikami	Lead role	
