= Zyuden Sentai Kyoryuger =

Television series

- Genre: Tokusatsu; Action-adventure; Science-fiction; Superhero fiction Comedy
- Created by: Toei Company
- Written by: Riku Sanjo
- Directed by: Koichi Sakamoto; Noboru Takemoto; Takayuki Shibasaki; Katsuya Watanabe; Hiroyuki Kato; Kazuya Konaka
- Starring: Ryo Ryusei; Syuusuke Saito; Yamato Kinjo; Akihisa Shiono; Ayuri Konno; Atsushi Maruyama; Marie Iitoyo
- Voices of: Toshiyuki Morikawa; Takayuki Sugō; Haruka Tomatsu; Satoshi Tsuruoka; Yu Mizushima; Ai Orikasa; Masaya Matsukaze
- Narrated by: Shigeru Chiba
- Opening theme: "VAMOLA! Kyoryuger" by Shogo Kamata
- Ending theme: "Minna Atsumare! Kyoryuger" by Hideaki Takatori
- Composer: Toshihiko Sahashi
- Country of origin: Japan
- No. of episodes: 48 (list of episodes)

Production
- Producers: Motoi Sasaki (TV Asahi); Takahito Ōmori (Toei); Koichi Yada (Toei); Akihiro Fukada (Toei Agency)
- Production location: Tokyo, Japan (Greater Tokyo Area)
- Running time: 24–25 minutes
- Production companies: TV Asahi; Toei Company; Toei Agency

Original release
- Network: ANN (TV Asahi)
- Release: February 17, 2013 – February 9, 2014

Related
- Tokumei Sentai Go-Busters; Ressha Sentai ToQger

Zyuden Sentai Kyoryuger (獣電戦隊キョウリュウジャー, Jūden Sentai Kyōryūjā; Electric Beast Squadron Kyoryuger) (Note: Kyōryū (強竜) when literally translated means "Strong Dragon", but is actually a portmanteau of the Japanese words Kyō (強, "strong") and Kyōryū (恐竜, "dinosaur"). In English, this roughly translates into "Strongosaur".) is Toei Company's 37th entry in its long-running Super Sentai metaseries of Japanese tokusatsu television series aired on TV Asahi from February 17, 2013 to February 9, 2014, replacing Tokumei Sentai Go-Busters and was replaced by Ressha Sentai ToQger. The program joining Kamen Rider Wizard and later Kamen Rider Gaim in TV Asahi's Super Hero Time programming block. Its footage was later used for the American Power Rangers season, Power Rangers Dino Charge and its follow up season, Dino Super Charge, and gained a South Korean-exclusive sequel, Power Rangers Dino Force Brave. This is the first Super Sentai series to be shot in Full HD at 1080p, as Shinkenger through Go-Busters was only shot in 720p.

== Story ==
Long ago in the time of dinosaurs, the Deboth Army invades Earth to the point of the extinction of the dinosaurs but they were defeated by Wise God Torin and the Zyudenryu during the first invasion. In the present day, the Deboth Army resurface as they resume their invasion. To counter the revived threat, Torin selects five brave individuals who must defeat their respective Zyudenryu first to acquire their powers to become the "People of the Great and Mighty Lizards", the Kyoryugers.

== Episodes ==
Individual episodes are known as "Braves" (ブレイブ, Bureibu), and the titles are written solely in kana.

| Brave no. | Title | Original release date |
|---|---|---|
| 1 | "He's Here! The Red King"; Transliteration: "Detā! Makka na Kingu" (Japanese: でたァーッ！まっかなキング) | February 17, 2013 |
| 2 | "Gaburincho! Snapping Combination"; Transliteration: "Gaburincho! Kamitsuki Gattai" (Japanese: ガブリンチョ！カミツキがったい) | February 24, 2013 |
| 3 | "Get Mad! The Slashing Brave"; Transliteration: "Areru ze! Zangeki no Bureibu" (Japanese: あれるぜ！ざんげきのブレイブ) | March 3, 2013 |
| 4 | "Fire! The Courageous Gaburivolver"; Transliteration: "Uchinuke! Yūki no Gaburiborubā" (Japanese: うちぬけ！ゆうきのガブリボルバー) | March 10, 2013 |
| 5 | "Boom! The Cavities of Ankydon"; Transliteration: "Dogōn! Mushiba no Ankidon" (Japanese: ドゴォーン！ムシバのアンキドン) | March 17, 2013 |
| 6 | "Stop! Singing Canderrilla"; Transliteration: "Sutoppu! Utau Kyanderira" (Japanese: ストップ！うたうキャンデリラ) | March 24, 2013 |
| 7 | "Angry! Daigo's in Big Trouble"; Transliteration: "Ikare! Daigo no Dai Pinchi" (Japanese: いかれ！ダイゴのだいピンチ) | March 31, 2013 |
| 8 | "Where Am I? Get Through the Maze"; Transliteration: "Kokodoko? Meiro o Buttobase" (Japanese: ココドコ？めいろをぶっとばせ) | April 7, 2013 |
| 9 | "So Strong! PteraidenOh"; Transliteration: "Mecha Tsuyo! Puteraidenō" (Japanese: メチャつよ！プテライデンオー) | April 14, 2013 |
| 10 | "Zandar! Gold Revival"; Transliteration: "Zandā! Gōrudo Fukkatsu" (Japanese: ザンダーッ！ゴールドふっかつ) | April 21, 2013 |
| 11 | "Utchy! How Cool"; Transliteration: "Utchī! Kūru de Gozaru" (Japanese: ウッチー！クールでござる) | April 28, 2013 |
| 12 | "Attack! The King and I"; Transliteration: "Buttobasso! Sessha to Kingu-dono" (Japanese: ブットバッソ！せっしゃとキングどの) | May 5, 2013 |
| 13 | "Jakireen! I'll Protect Your Heart"; Transliteration: "Jakirīn! Hāto o Mamorinuke" (Japanese: ジャキリーン！ハートをまもりぬけ) | May 12, 2013 |
| 14 | "Watch Out! The Spirit Base"; Transliteration: "Abunaāi! Supiritto Bēsu" (Japanese: あぶなァーい！スピリットベース) | May 19, 2013 |
| 15 | "How Annoying! Dogold's Ambition"; Transliteration: "Haradatashii ze! Dogorudo no Yabō" (Japanese: はらだたしいぜッ！ドゴルドのやぼう) | May 26, 2013 |
| 16 | "Dig-a-dug! My Treasure"; Transliteration: "Mogumogūn! Ore no Takaramono" (Japanese: モグモグーン！おれのたからもの) | June 2, 2013 |
| 17 | "Serious! Kyoryu Gray"; Transliteration: "Gachi da ze! Kyōryū Gurē" (Japanese: ガチだぜ！キョウリュウグレー) | June 9, 2013 |
| 18 | "Caught! Kung-Fu Strike"; Transliteration: "Tsukanda! Kanfū Hissatsuken" (Japanese: つかんだッ！カンフーひっさつけん) | June 23, 2013 |
| 19 | "Kywaeen! Kidnapped Family"; Transliteration: "Kyawaīn! Ubawareta Famirī" (Japanese: キャワイーン！うばわれたファミリー) | June 30, 2013 |
| 20 | "Unluckyu! The Tanabata Windfall"; Transliteration: "Anrakkyū! Tanabata no Tanabota" (Japanese: アンラッキュー！タナバタのタナボタ) | July 7, 2013 |
| 21 | "Zuon! Plezuon Returns"; Transliteration: "Zuōn! Kaettekita Purezuon" (Japanese: ズオーン！かえってきたプレズオン) | July 14, 2013 |
| 22 | "Im-poss-i-ble! Deboth Resurrects"; Transliteration: "Ma-sa-ka! Dēbosu Fukkatsu" (Japanese: ま・さ・か！デーボスふっかつ) | July 21, 2013 |
| 23 | "Go! Bakuretsu Kyoryuzin"; Transliteration: "Tate! Bakuretsu Kyōryūjin" (Japanese: たてッ！バクレツキョウリュウジン) | July 28, 2013 |
| 24 | "Burn! The Seven Kyoryugers"; Transliteration: "Moero! Shichinin no Kyōryūjā" (Japanese: もえろ！7にんのキョウリュウジャー) | August 4, 2013 |
| 25 | "What's This! The Deboth Army's Nightmare"; Transliteration: "Nani Kore! Dēbosu Gun no Akumu" (Japanese: ナニコレ！デーボスぐんのあくむ) | August 11, 2013 |
| 26 | "Oh My! The Gabutyra Human"; Transliteration: "Bikkuri! Gabutira Ningen" (Japanese: ビックリ！ガブティラにんげん) | August 18, 2013 |
| 27 | "O Matsurincho! Red's Super Evolution"; Transliteration: "O Matsurincho! Reddo Chō Shinka" (Japanese: オ・マツリンチョ！レッドちょうしんか) | September 1, 2013 |
| 28 | "Ah Torin! The Hundred Million-Year-Old Grudge"; Transliteration: "Aa Torin! Ichi-oku-nen no Urami" (Japanese: ああトリン！１おくねんのうらみ) | September 8, 2013 |
| 29 | "Big Attack! Dance Carnival"; Transliteration: "Daigekitotsu! Odore Kānibaru" (Japanese: だいげきとつ！おどれカーニバル) | September 15, 2013 |
| 30 | "Give It to Me! The Guardians' Fragment"; Transliteration: "Te ni Irero! Gādianzu no Kakera" (Japanese: てにいれろ！ガーディアンズのかけら) | September 22, 2013 |
| 31 | "Vacance! The Eternal Holiday"; Transliteration: "Bākansu! Eien no Horidē" (Japanese: バーカンス！えいえんのホリデー) | September 29, 2013 |
| 32 | "Victory! It's a Sports Match"; Transliteration: "Bikutorī! Supōtsu Shōbu da" (Japanese: ビクトリー！スポーツしょうぶだ) | October 6, 2013 |
| 33 | "Maximum! I Will Protect the Lady"; Transliteration: "Makishimamu! Redi wa Ore ga Mamoru" (Japanese: マキシマム！レディはおれがまもる) | October 13, 2013 |
| 34 | "Revival! Bragigas Appears"; Transliteration: "Fukkatsu! Buragigasu Shutsugen" (Japanese: ふっかつ！ブラギガスしゅつげん) | October 20, 2013 |
| 35 | "Super Awesome! Gigant Kyoryuzin"; Transliteration: "Chō Sugee!! Giganto Kyōryūjin" (Japanese: チョーすげえッ！ギガントキョウリュウジン) | October 27, 2013 |
| 36 | "Giga Gaburincho! The Silver Miracle"; Transliteration: "Giga Gaburincho! Kiseki no Shirubā" (Japanese: ギガガブリンチョ！きせきのシルバー) | November 10, 2013 |
| 37 | "Revenge! The Ghost Deboth Army"; Transliteration: "Ribenji! Yūrei Dēbosu Gun" (Japanese: リベンジ！ゆうれいデーボスぐん) | November 17, 2013 |
| 38 | "Love Touch! The Too Beautiful Zorima"; Transliteration: "Rabu Tatchi! Utsukushisugiru Zōrima" (Japanese: らぶタッチ！うつくしすぎるゾーリま) | November 24, 2013 |
| 39 | "Full Force! The Ten Kyoryugers' Power"; Transliteration: "Seizoroi! Jū-dai Kyōryū Pawā" (Japanese: せいぞろい！10だいキョウリュウパワー) | December 1, 2013 |
| 40 | "Wowie! Pops Is Broken-Hearted"; Transliteration: "Gutto Kūru! Ossan wa Tsurai yo" (Japanese: グッとくーる！オッサンはつらいよ) | December 8, 2013 |
| 41 | "Yanasanta! The Deboth World War"; Transliteration: "Yanasanta! Dēbosu Sekai Kessen" (Japanese: ヤナサンタ！デーボスせかいけっせん) | December 15, 2013 |
| 42 | "Wonderful! Christmas of Justice"; Transliteration: "Wandahō! Seigi no Kurisumasu" (Japanese: ワンダホー！せいぎのクリスマス) | December 22, 2013 |
| 43 | "The Blade of the Soul! Roar, Straizer"; Transliteration: "Tamashii no Tsurugi! Unare Sutoreizā" (Japanese: たましいのつるぎ！うなれストレイザー) | January 5, 2014 |
| 44 | "Kaos Laughs! Destruction's Countdown"; Transliteration: "Warau Kaosu! Hametsu no Kauntodaun" (Japanese: わらうカオス！はめつのカウントダウン) | January 12, 2014 |
| 45 | "That Can't Be Dad! The End of Silver"; Transliteration: "Uso Daro Oyaji! Shirubā no Saigo" (Japanese: うそだろオヤジ！シルバーのさいご) | January 19, 2014 |
| 46 | "The Great Duel! The Strike of Love and Tears"; Transliteration: "Daikettō! Ai to Namida no Ichigeki" (Japanese: だいけっとう！アイとなみだのいちげき) | January 26, 2014 |
| 47 | "The Great Counterattack! The Greatest Final Brave"; Transliteration: "Daihangeki! Saidai Saigo no Bureibu" (Japanese: だいはんげき！さいだいさいごのブレイブ) | February 2, 2014 |
| 48 (Final) | "The Big Explosion! Goodbye Kyoryugers"; Transliteration: "Daibakuhatsu! Sayonara Kyōryūjā" (Japanese: だいばくはつ！さよならキョウリュウジャー) | February 9, 2014 |

== Production ==
Zyuden Sentai Kyoryuger is the third Sentai series with a dinosaur motif (after Kyōryū Sentai Zyuranger and Bakuryū Sentai Abaranger); this time mixed with electricity and up-tempo musical genres such as Samba. Ryo Ryusei, who portrays Daigo Kiryu, said he will find it difficult to live up to the role as the hero in the series. Yamato Kinjo, who portrays Nobuharu Udo, turns 30 within the year and spoke of how he felt it might be difficult to portray a hero to children so much younger than he is.

Critics have noted a drastic shift in the casting of Kyoryuger. Toei producer Takahito Ōmori commented on the lack of a yellow warrior in the series, something that has not happened since Dengeki Sentai Changeman, by noting that the color yellow has become associated with females for the modern generation of viewers and thus would not be able to properly portray the brutish strength a male character is capable of portraying to match with the concept that the characters beat their dinosaur partners in battle. Ōmori also stated that they chose to make the blue warrior aged 32 to insert some oyaji gags, while also noting the use of Papaya Suzuki as the ending theme's choreographer to insert some levity, hot-blooded actor Shinji Yamashita as the red warrior's father, and the inclusion of Shigeru Chiba as the series' narrator who gives a high tension style to the show.

== Films and Specials ==
The Kyoryugers made their first appearance as a cameo in the crossover film Tokumei Sentai Go-Busters vs. Kaizoku Sentai Gokaiger: The Movie.

=== Theatrical ===
==== Super Hero Taisen Z ====
Kamen Rider × Super Sentai × Space Sheriff: Super Hero Taisen Z (仮面ライダー×スーパー戦隊×宇宙刑事 スーパーヒーロー大戦Z, Kamen Raidā × Sūpā Sentai × Uchū Keiji: Supā Hīrō Taisen Zetto) is a film that was released in Japan on 27 April 2013 which featured the first crossover between characters of Toei's three main Tokusatsu franchises, Kamen Rider, Super Sentai, and the Space Sheriff Series, including other heroes from the Metal Heroes series as well. The protagonists of Space Sheriff Gavan: The Movie, Tokumei Sentai Go-Busters, and Kaizoku Sentai Gokaiger are featured, but the casts of Kamen Rider Wizard, Zyuden Sentai Kyoryuger, and Kamen Rider Fourze also participate in the film. The event of the movie takes place between Brave 10 and 11.

==== Gaburincho of Music ====
As with every year, Zyuden Sentai Kyoryuger appears in their own film titled Zyuden Sentai Kyoryuger the Movie: Gaburincho of Music (劇場版 獣電戦隊キョウリュウジャー GABURINCHO OF MUSIC, Gekijōban Jūden Sentai Kyōryūjā Gaburincho Obu Myūjikku), which is a musical, that was released in theaters on 3 August 2013, double-billed with Kamen Rider Wizard in Magic Land. The event of the movie takes place between Brave 20 and 21.

==== Kyoryuger vs. Go-Busters ====
Zyuden Sentai Kyoryuger vs. Go-Busters: The Great Dinosaur Battle! Farewell Our Eternal Friends (獣電戦隊キョウリュウジャーVSゴーバスターズ 恐竜大決戦！ さらば永遠の友よ, Jūden Sentai Kyōryūjā Tai Gōbasutāzu Kyōryū Daikessen! Saraba Eien no Tomo yo) was released in theaters on 18 January 2014. As with previous VS movies, this film features a crossover between the casts of Zyuden Sentai Kyoryuger and Tokumei Sentai Go-Busters while also bringing in cameos from the casts of Kyōryū Sentai Zyuranger and Bakuryū Sentai Abaranger & The heroes of Ressha Sentai ToQger. The event of the movie takes place between Brave 36 and 37.

==== Kamen Rider Taisen ====
The main casts from Ressha Sentai ToQger and Kamen Rider Gaim, along with Ryo Ryusei who returns as Daigo Kiryu from Zyuden Sentai Kyoryuger participate in Heisei Rider vs. Shōwa Rider: Kamen Rider Taisen feat. Super Sentai (平成ライダー対昭和ライダー 仮面ライダー大戦 feat.スーパー戦隊, Heisei Raidā Tai Shōwa Raidā Kamen Raidā Taisen feat. Sūpā Sentai) which debuted in theaters on 29 March 2014. It also features the return of characters from previous Kamen Rider Series, most notably Hiroshi Fujioka of the original Kamen Rider.

==== ToQger vs. Kyoryuger ====
Ressha Sentai ToQger vs. Kyoryuger: The Movie (烈車戦隊トッキュウジャーVSキョウリュウジャー THE MOVIE, Ressha Sentai Tokkyūjā Tai Kyōryūjā Za Mūbī) is the VS team-up movie between Ressha Sentai ToQger and Zyuden Sentai Kyoryuger. The film was released in Japanese theaters on 17 January 2015.

==== Ultra Super Hero Taisen ====
A crossover film, titled Kamen Rider × Super Sentai: Ultra Super Hero Taisen (仮面ライダー×スーパー戦隊 超スーパーヒーロー大戦, Kamen Raidā × Supā Sentai Chō Supā Hīrō Taisen) featuring the casts of Kamen Rider Ex-Aid, Amazon Riders, Uchu Sentai Kyuranger, and Doubutsu Sentai Zyuohger, was released in Japan on 25 March 2017. This movie also celebrates the 10th anniversary of Kamen Rider Den-O and features the spaceship Andor Genesis from the Xevious game, which is used by the movie's main antagonists, as well as introduces the movie-exclusive Kamen Rider True Brave, played by Kamen Rider Brave's actor Toshiki Seto from Kamen Rider Ex-Aid, and the villain Shocker Great Leader III, played by the singer Diamond Yukai. In addition, individual actors from older Kamen Rider and Super Sentai TV series, Ryohei Odai (Kamen Rider Ryuki), Gaku Matsumoto (Shuriken Sentai Ninninger), Atsushi Maruyama (Zyuden Sentai Kyoryuger), and Hiroya Matsumoto (Tokumei Sentai Go-Busters) reprise their respective roles.

=== Special episodes ===
- Zyuden Sentai Kyoryuger: It's Here! Armed On Midsummer Festival!! (獣電戦隊キョウリュウジャー でたァーッ！まなつのアームド・オンまつり!!, Jūden Sentai Kyōryūjā Detā! Manatsu no Āmudo On Matsuri!!) is a special DVD by Kodansha that details Daigo and Utsusemimaru dealing with Nobuharu when he is possessed by the ghosts of Debo Tangosekku and Debo Tanabanta. With the assistance of Ramirez and Tessai however, the two Kyoryugers gain Spirit Ranger versions of the Pteragordon and Plezuon Zyudenchi to send the spirits back to Deboth Hell. The special concludes with a promo for the Kyoryuger movie and takes place between Brave 23 and 24.
- This Is Brave! Battle Frontier (これぞブレイブ！たたかいのフロンティア, Korezo Bureibu! Tatakai no Furontia) is a web-exclusive episode released on the official Brave Frontier YouTube channel as a collaboration between the Toei Company and video game producer Alim to promote the release of Brave Frontier 2 in Japan. This special also serves as a reunion between the series's original cast and is denoted as Brave 33.5, taking place between Brave 33 and 34.

=== V-Cinema ===
==== Hundred Years After ====
Zyuden Sentai Kyoryuger Returns: Hundred Years After (帰ってきた獣電戦隊キョウリュウジャー 100 YEARS AFTER, Kaettekita Jūden Sentai Kyōryūjā Handoreddo Iyāzu Afutā) is a V-Cinema release released on 20 June 2014, taking places between Brave 42 and 43. The main cast of Ryo Ryusei, Syuusuke Saito, Yamato Kinjo, Akihisa Shiono, Ayuri Konno, and Atsushi Maruyama reprise their roles from the series while also portraying a future generation of Kyoryugers introduced in the movie.

==== King-Ohger vs. Kyoryuger ====
Ohsama Sentai King-Ohger vs. Kyoryuger (王様戦隊キングオージャーVSキョウリュウジャー, Ōsama Sentai Kinguōjā Tai Kyōryūjā) is a V-Cinema release that features a crossover between Kyoryuger and Ohsama Sentai King-Ohger and also celebrates the 10th anniversary of the series. The V-Cinema had a limited theatrical release on 26 April 2024, double-billed with Ohsama Sentai King-Ohger vs. Donbrothers, and followed by its DVD and Blu-ray release on 9 October 2024. The main cast of Ryo Ryusei, Syuusuke Saito, Yamato Kinjo, Akihisa Shiono, Ayuri Konno, and Atsushi Maruyama, and Marie Iitoyo reprise their roles from the series.

== Video game ==
The Kyoryugers appear in their very own video game developed by Namco Bandai Games for the Nintendo 3DS called Zyuden Sentai Kyoryuger: Game on Gaburincho!! (獣電戦隊キョウリュウジャー ゲームでガブリンチョ!!, Jūden Sentai Kyōryūjā Gēmu de Gaburincho!!), released on 8 August 2013.

== Cast ==
- Daigo Kiryu (桐生 ダイゴ, Kiryū Daigo): Ryo Ryusei (竜星 涼, Ryūsei Ryō)
- Ian Yorkland (イアン・ヨークランド, Ian Yōkurando): Syuusuke Saito (斉藤 秀翼, Saitō Shūsuke)
- Nobuharu Udo (有働 ノブハル, Udō Nobuharu): Yamato Kinjo (金城 大和, Kinjō Yamato)
- Souji Rippukan (立風館 ソウジ, Rippūkan Sōji): Akihisa Shiono (塩野 瑛久, Shiono Akihisa)
- Amy Yuuzuki (アミィ結月, Amyi Yūzuki): Ayuri Konno (今野 鮎莉, Konno Ayuri)
- Utsusemimaru (空蝉丸): Atsushi Maruyama (丸山 敦史, Maruyama Atsushi)
- Dantetsu Kiryu (桐生 ダンテツ, Kiryū Dantetsu): Shinji Yamashita (山下 真司, Yamashita Shinji)
- Yuko Fukui (福井 優子, Fukui Yūko): Ayumi Kinoshita (木下 あゆ美, Kinoshita Ayumi)
- Rika Fukui (福井 理香, Fukui Rika): Nanami Tsunamoto (綱本 菜々美, Tsunamoto Nanami)
- Genryu Rippukan (立風館 源流, Rippūkan Genryū): Junichi Haruta (春田 純一, Haruta Jun'ichi)
- Gentle (ジェントル, Jentoru): Kentaro Shimazu (島津 健太郎, Shimazu Kentaro)
- Ramirez (ラミレス, Ramiresu): Robert Baldwin (ロバート・ボールドウィン, Robāto Bōrudowin)
- Tessai (鉄砕), Shinya Tsukouchi (津古内 真也, Tsukouchi Shin'ya; 38, 47–48): Masayuki Deai (出合 正幸, Deai Masayuki)
- Yayoi Woorushade (弥生ウルシェード, Yayoi Urushēdo): Marie Iitoyo (飯豊 まりえ, Iitoyo Marie)

=== Voice cast ===
- Wise God Torin (賢神トリン, Kenjin Torin): Toshiyuki Morikawa (森川 智之, Morikawa Toshiyuki)
- Many-Faced High Priest Kaos (百面神官カオス, Hyakumen Shinkan Kaosu): Takayuki Sugō (菅生 隆之, Sugō Takayuki)
- Joyful Knight Canderrilla (喜びの戦騎キャンデリラ, Yorokobi no Senki Kyanderira): Haruka Tomatsu (戸松 遥, Tomatsu Haruka)
- Raging Knight Dogold (怒りの戦騎ドゴルド, Ikari no Senki Dogorudo): Satoshi Tsuruoka (鶴岡 聡, Tsuruoka Satoshi)
- Sorrowful Knight Aigallon (哀しみの戦騎アイガロン, Kanashimi no Senki Aigaron): Yū Mizushima (水島 裕, Mizushima Yū)
- Funfilled Spy Luckyulo (楽しみの密偵ラッキューロ, Tanoshimi no Mittei Rakkyūro): Ai Orikasa (折笠 愛, Orikasa Ai)
- Resentful Knight Endolf (怨みの戦騎エンドルフ, Urami no Senki Endorufu): Masaya Matsukaze (松風 雅也, Matsukaze Masaya)
- New Sorrowful Knight Aisurondo (新・哀しみの戦騎アイスロンド, Shin Kanashimi no Senki Aisurondo): Ryōta Takeuchi (竹内 良太, Takeuchi Ryōta)
- New Joyful Knight Kiruborero (新・喜びの戦騎キルボレロ, Shin Yorokobi no Senki Kiruborero): Akio Suyama (陶山 章央, Suyama Akio)
- Transcendenterfly God Deboth (蝶絶神デーボス, Chōzetsushin Dēbosu): Tōru Ōkawa (大川 透, Ōkawa Tōru)
- Narrator, Kyoryuger Equipment, Doctor Woorushade (ドクター・ウルシェード, Dokutā Urushēdo; 21–22, 24, 47–48): Shigeru Chiba (千葉 繁, Chiba Shigeru)

=== Guest cast ===
- Shiro Mifune (御船 士郎, Mifune Shirō; 4): Kenji Ebisawa (海老澤 健次, Ebisawa Kanji)
- Hiroshi Nakazato (中里 博史, Nakazato Hiroshi; 15): Jouji Shibue (渋江 譲二, Shibue Jōji) (Note: Jouji Shibue previously portrayed Mamoru Chiba in Pretty Guardian Sailor Moon and Ibuki in Kamen Rider Hibiki.)
- Mikoto Amano (Meeko) (天野 美琴（Meeko）, Amano Mikoto (Mīko); 39): Shizuka Nakamura (中村 静香, Nakamura Shizuka)
- Ferocious Knight D (獰猛の戦騎D, Dōmō no Senki Dī; Voice; 39): Mamoru Miyano (宮野 真守, Miyano Mamoru)
- Reiko Tanba (丹波 麗子, Tanba Reiko; 43): Sayoko Hagiwara (萩原 佐代子, Hagiwara Sayoko)
- Papaya Suzuki (パパイヤ鈴木, Papaiya Suzuki; 48)
- Riku Sanjo (三条 陸, Sanjō Riku; 48)

== Songs ==
Opening theme

- "Vamola! Kyoryuger" (VAMOLA！キョウリュウジャー, Bamora! Kyōryūjā) (Note: "Vamola" is Brazilian Portuguese for "leggo (let's go)".)
  - Lyrics: Shoko Fujibayashi
  - Composition: Yusuke Mochida
  - Arrangement: Kousuke Yamashita, Yusuke Mochida
  - Artist: Shogo Kamada (鎌田 章吾, Kamada Shōgo)

Remixes of the song were used in the series: "Vamola! Kyoryuger (Samba Mix)" (VAMOLA! キョウリュウジャー(Samba Mix), Bamōra! Kyōryūjā (Sanba Mikkusu)) in episode 31 and "Vamola! Kyoryuger (Earth's True Melody Version)" (VAMOLA! キョウリュウジャー(真の地球のメロディver.), Bamōra! Kyōryūjā (Shin no Chikyū no Merodi ver.)) sung by Syuusuke Saito, Yamato Kinjo, Akihisa Shiono, Ayuri Konno, and Marie Iitoyo during the climax of the final episode. The film Zyuden Sentai Kyoryuger vs. Go-Busters: The Great Dinosaur Battle! Farewell Our Eternal Friends uses a slow melody remix called "Vamola! Kyoryuger (Dino Hope ver.)" (VAMOLA! キョウリュウジャー（ダイノホープver.）, Bamōra! Kyōryūjā (Daino Hōpu ver.)). In the V-Cinema 100 Years After, it is called "Vamola! Kyoryuger (Canderrilla ver.)" (VAMOLA! キョウリュウジャー(キャンデリラver.), Bamōra! Kyōryūjā (Kyanderira ver.)) sung by Haruka Tomatsu as Canderrilla.
Ending theme

- "Minna Atsumare! Kyoryuger" (みんな集まれ！キョウリュウジャー, Minna Atsumare! Kyōryūjā; "Everyone Gather! Kyoryuger")
  - Lyrics: Saburo Yatsude, Hideaki Takatori
  - Composition: Hideaki Takatori
  - Arrangement: Hiroaki Kagoshima
  - Artist: Hideaki Takatori
