= List of Zyuden Sentai Kyoryuger episodes =

The episodes in this list are from Zyuden Sentai Kyoryuger Individual episodes are known as "Brave (ブレイブ, Bureibu) [number]. All of the episodes were written by Riku Sanjo.

== Episodes ==
Brave no.	Title	Original release date
1	"He's Here! The Red King"; Transliteration: "Detā! Makka na Kingu" (Japanese: でたァーッ！まっかなキング)	February 17, 2013
Millions of years after the extinction of dinosaurs, the Deboth Army, who caused it, thaw from their Antarctic prison as its leader Kaos sends the Zorima to attack all corners of the world to finish what they have started with the human race as their new target. But a group of Zorima at an island in the southern sea were hindered from terrorizing the islanders by an adventurous youth referring to himself "King" before by a mysterious bird man arrives to give the youth, Daigo Kiryu, a petrified gun before summoning a T-Rex that wipes out the remaining Zorima. Introducing himself, Wise God Torin reveals to Daigo that the Zorima groups sent to other parts of the world have been quickly thwarted by a new generation of warriors called the Kyoryugers. Torin adds that Daigo must tame the T-Rex Zyudenryu Gabutyra in combat to become the fifth Kyoryuger. After a month of punishment, Daigo manages to tame Gabutyra though his Gaburivolver is still petrified. But sensing the Deboth Army gathering their strength, Torin teleports Daigo to the Tiger Boy restaurant in Japan where the youth meets a flirt, worker, a strong girl, and a youth. While the others end up in an argument, Daigo finds himself in Torin's Spirit Base and informs the curious deity of the amber pendant he got from his father. By then, Torin senses Gabutyra attempting to kill the Debo Monster Debo Hyogakki —the one responsible for the dinosaurs' extinction. Despite knowing the Zyudenryu's reasons to keep him from harm, Daigo confronts the Zorima while winning the thawed Gabutyra's respect to allow him to transform into Kyoryu Red. Giving Gabutyra his Zyudenchi, Kyoryu Red and his Zyudenryu battle the Zorima and Giant Zorima at all fronts before the other Kyoryugers arrive. While the other Kyoryugers deal with the Zorima, Kyoryu Red and Gabutyra join forces to destroy Debo Hyogakki. Though they prefer to remain anonymous, Daigo cancels his transformation as he introduces himself to the other Kyoryugers.
2	"Gaburincho! Snapping Combination"; Transliteration: "Gaburincho! Kamitsuki Gattai" (Japanese: ガブリンチョ！カミツキがったい)	February 24, 2013
At the request of a girl named Rika Fukui and her friends, Daigo builds a T-Rex statue for an upcoming museum exhibit before he meets two of the people he met earlier at the Tiger Boy: Rika's uncle Nobuharu Udo and a rich girl named Amy Yuuzuki. However, a group of Zorima under the Debo Monster Debo Peshango appear with Daigo transforming into Kyoryu Red to fight them before going after Debo Peshango. However, the tearful Sorrowful Knight Aigallon arrives and reluctantly fights Kyoryu Red until Kyoryu Black and Kyoryu Green arrive and teach the newbie how to use his personal weapon, forcing Debo Peshango to fall back while taking his frustration on the T-Rex statue. While placing his Zyudenchi away to be recharged for the next use, Daigo meets Kyoryu Pink and Blue with the former revealing herself to be Amy. When Daigo mentions he likes her resolve and that they can fight together, Kyoryu Blue reveals himself as Nobuharu while telling him that he doesn't know how it feels to worry about dragging his family into this. The next day, Nobuharu finds Daigo restoring the wooden sculpture and learns that he went to his Zyudenryu Stegotchi to learn how Rika got attacked by the Zorima before Nobuharu saved his niece. The Deboth Army then resume their attack with Amy finally revealing her fighting skills while instructing the shocked Gentle to take the children to safety. Seeing Rika attempt to protect the statue from Debo Peshango, Nobuharu uses the statue to knock the Debo Monster back while realizing it is his need to protect his family is what makes him strong. With Gentle taking Rika to safety, the three Kyoryugers transform to fight the Zorima before going after Debo Peshango. However, as Aigallon cries over his defeated minion while Kyoryu Black and Green arrive, Canderrilla arrives with Luckyulo using his Sukusuku Joylo to enlarge Debo Peshango. In response, Kyoryu Red summons Gabutyra to fight Debo Peshango while Torin tells Kyoryu Blue and Pink to summon Stegotchi and Dricera to combine their Zyudenryu for the first time into Kyoryuzin who destroys the Debo Monster. The next day, the dinosaur exhibit ends with Gabutyra posing as Amy and Nobuharu understand Daigo well now.
3	"Get Mad! The Slashing Brave"; Transliteration: "Areru ze! Zangeki no Bureibu" (Japanese: あれるぜ！ざんげきのブレイブ)	March 3, 2013
While working at the Tiger Boy with Daigo helping as part time chef, Amy greets Souji Rippukan as he orders a cream soda. However, Souji is dragged out of the restaurant by his father Genryu Rippukan as he sees the youth to be straying from their family tradition of being great swordsmen as the Debo Monster Debo Royaroya captures martial artists. Souji's father fends off the monster as Kyoryu Red, Kyoryu Blue, and Kyoryu Pink arrive to take over. As Kyoryu Green arrives with Kyoryu Black following to even the odds, the Debo Monster is hit from behind by the temperamental Raging Knight Dogold as he single handedly overpowers the Kyoryugers while Debo Royaroya makes a run for it. Kyoryu Green then loses his cool during the fight with a dismayed Dogold taking his leave. While at the Spirit Base, Daigo confronts Kyoryu Green about his temper as the two engage in a duel. Regardless of his opponent using the Gaburivolver, Kyoryu Green accepts defeat and reveals himself to be Souji before he takes his leave. Later, Souji finds Daigo and Amy at his home as the former tries to understand Souji's plight from his father. Having heard enough, Souji runs off into the bamboo forest where Zakutor is before Amy gives him a DeinoChaser Zyudenchi at Daigo's suggestion. By that time, Debo Royaroya captures Daigo and Souji's father. As Amy fights off the Zorima, Souji uses the DeinoChaser to catch up to Debo Royaroya at his lair. Destroying Debo Royaroya's cage, Souji frees both his father and Daigo with his variation of his house's Slashing Peerless Sword. Using the DeinoChasers, Kyoryu Green and Kyoryu Red defeat Debo Royaroya. However, threatened by Dogold, Luckyulo enlarges Debo Royaroya with Kyoryuzin formed to keep the Debo Monster from taking back his captives as Kyoryu Green joins in with his Zyudenryu Zakutor. With Dricera separating to free the captives, Kyoryuzin Stegotchi-Zakutor is formed to finish off Debo Royaroya. Later, with his father's blessing as he intends to continue the Rippukan School, Souji joins the Kyoryugers while thanking Daigo for helping him. At the Spirit Base, taking the Kentrospiker Zyudenchi with him, Ian states that he won't be joining them anytime soon.
4	"Fire! The Courageous Gaburivolver"; Transliteration: "Uchinuke! Yūki no Gaburiborubā" (Japanese: うちぬけ！ゆうきのガブリボルバー)	March 10, 2013
While helping the others out, Daigo is formally introduced to the gun slinging Casanova Ian Yorkland, but when Daigo asks if he ever missed a shot, Ian took offense to it and left. However, seeing a jewelry store being robbed, Ian turns into Kyoryu Black to face the Debo Monster Debo Doronboss. The other arrive and fight Debo Doronboss, but the Debo Monster grabs Kyoryu Red as Kyoryu Black was about to fire. With Kyoryu Black unable to fire his Gaburivolver, the others free Kyoryu Red with Debo Doronboss forced to fall back with Kyoryu Black leaving in a huff. Reaching the Spirit Base, Torin tells the Kyoryugers that they may need the Kentrospiker Zyudenchi but it is missing before alerting the group to Debo Doronboss as he was about to rob a painter's scenery. While they face Debo Doronboss, Kyoryu Black arrives and uses the missing Kentrospiker Zyudenchi with the Gaburivolver, but the recoil proves too much for Kyoryu Black to handle as it sends him and Kyoryu Red crashing into a car as Debo Doronboss runs off. Later, while telling the others they may need to work together, Daigo confirms Kyoryu Black's identity to be Ian as he condescends Daigo's naive nature, before taking his leave. However, Daigo follows and gets Ian to open up and reveals how he was a treasure hunter until the day his best friend Shiro Mifune was murdered by a cloaked figure resembling Debo Doronboss when they were looking for a rare stone. Knocked off the cliff, Ian was saved by the Zyudenryu Parasagun and has since vowed to avenge his friend. Telling Ian that unless he shoots he would still regret the event, Daigo joins the others as they face Debo Doronboss to give their Zyudenchi time to recharge. However, Aigallon and Luckyulo join the fray with the Deboth Army overpowering the Kyoryugers until Ian arrives and manages to save Daigo from Debo Doronboss's hold by taking the shot. After being thanked in Ian's way, Daigo declares their team finally complete as they assume their Kyoryuger forms and combine their personal weapons with Kentrospiker Zyudenchi to destroy Debo Doronboss's cloak. But after Debo Doronboss is enlarged, Kyoryu Black summons Parasagun before it combines with Gabutyra and Zakutor to form Kyoryuzin Western and destroys the Debo Monster. Though the stone he and Shiro were looking for is nowhere to be seen, Ian considers the other Kyoryugers his friends and vows to protect them. At the Frozen Castle, Aigallon laments the loss of the cloak he gave to Debo Doronboss as he reveals himself to be the hooded figure who killed Shiro and stole the stone he and Ian were looking for.
5	"Boom! The Cavities of Ankydon"; Transliteration: "Dogōn! Mushiba no Ankidon" (Japanese: ドゴォーン！ムシバのアンキドン)	March 17, 2013
After getting into a fight with Ian while they and the others are testing the powers of the Zyudenchi, Souji feels he and Ian can not work together. Soon after, the Kyoryugers are alerted to Deboth activity at a pastry shop where everyone is in pain from cavities after eating the shop's cakes. Canderrilla and Luckyulo soon discover this as well, as any plans they have would be to make people unbearably happy, and discover that their cavity-ridden Debo Monster Debo Bathisie is the cause. During the fight, Kyoryu Green and Kyoryu Black's disagreement puts them at a disadvantage, allowing Debo Bathisie to escape. At the same time, a mysterious Zyudenryu emerges while Torin and a mysterious man arrive to the battle. The man is introduced as Ramirez, the partner to the Zyudenryu Ankydon who suddenly went wild. Upon revealing Ankydon to be one of the five missing members of the Ten Great Zyudenryu, Torin believes that Debo Bathisie has caused Ankydon's strange behavior. Despite Ramirez trying to ease the tension between the feuding Kyoryugers, Souji scolds the man's naivete while Ian agrees to help him calm Ankydon. Though Souji speaks ill of Ian after he runs off, Daigo him to reveals that Ramirez is actually a ghost and that Ian has only agreed to help as he noticed this fact as well. Meanwhile, upon revealing to Canderrilla he was not acting on his own accord, Debo Bathisie suddenly goes wild again and transforms. He attacks the city once more before being spotted by Ian who hits the Debo Monster while transforming into Kyoryu Black. However, Kyoryu Black finds his attack on Debo Bathisie's teeth had no effect, but he instead finds himself with painful cavities. Luckily, Souji arrives to protect Kyoryu Black from the Debo Monster's attacks with the others following soon after. The two agree that they should help each other, and they trade Zyudenchi to fight in tandem. Kyoryu Green uses Parasagun to cut away Debo Bathisie's teeth and Kyoryu Black uses Zakutor to finish the attack, freeing him from the painful cavities. Before he can be destroyed, Debo Bathisie uses a Sukusuku Joylo to enlarge, now with a new set of teeth, as Kyoryuzin is formed to fight the Debo Monster. With Torin and Ramirez telling them to board it with the others, Kyoryu Black and Kyoryu Green enter Kyoryuzin so the five Kyoryugers' Brave can enable it to use the Goren Zyudenken sword, destroying Debo Bathisie with the Brave Finish attack. While all of Debo Bathisie's victims are now restored to good health, the group soon discovers that both Debo Bathisie and Ankydon have actually been under the influence of another Debo Monster: Debo Viruson.
6	"Stop! Singing Canderrilla"; Transliteration: "Sutoppu! Utau Kyanderira" (Japanese: ストップ！うたうキャンデリラ)	March 24, 2013
After learning the truth of Ankydon's manipulator, Torin reveals to the Kyoryugers that the Debo Monster to be Debo Viruson who Ramirez battled in the Middle Ages with the monster entering Ankydon's Zyudenchi when seemingly destroyed. Though, Ramirez is confident in her and her teammates, Amy feels a sadness from him and eavesdrop to learn that Ramirez is fading away as a result of Debo Viruson's actions. Seeing Amy and realizing that she overheard his talk with Torin, Ramirez is touched when she takes him with her as he can sense Ankydon's location. Elsewhere, with her scheme failure, Canderrilla decides to vent her frustrations with her Joyful Song when a projection of Debo Viruson appears and offers a team up to fill up her quota. When she and Ramirez find people falling asleep, a Debo Wilson projection appears with Amy assuming her Kyoryuger form as she learns that Canderrilla's singing is empowering Debo Wilson and that Ankydon is likely nearby. Sent by Kaos alongside Dogold, Aigallon appears with the other Kyoryugers arriving to her aid. As Kyoryu Black and Kyoryu Green hold of Aigallon while Kyoryu Red and Kyoryu deal with Dogold, Kyoryu Pink arrives to stop Canderrilla's concert. As she deals with Luckyulo, Ramirez calls out Ankydon with the Zyudenryu emerging as Kyoryu Pink uses her Tuperanda Zyudenchi to enter Ankydon's Zyudenchi where she is overpowered by Debo Wilson. Using the Stymero Zyudenchi to make him fall in love with her, Amy tricks Debo Viruson to follow her out. As a result, Ramirez regains his powers as he watches Kyoryu Pink break Debo Wilson's heart and then him before Luckyulo enlarges him. Transforming into Kyoryu Cyan, Ramirez enables Ankydon to combine with Gabutyra and Dricera to form Kyoryuzin Macho to destroy Debo Viruson for good. Entrusting Ankydon to the others, Kyoryu Cyan departs to find the other Zyudenryu.
7	"Angry! Daigo's in Big Trouble"; Transliteration: "Ikare! Daigo no Dai Pinchi" (Japanese: いかれ！ダイゴのだいピンチ)	March 31, 2013
At the Spirit Base, Daigo creates a cartoon drawing of the Kyoryugers, Zyudenryu, and Deboth Army to serve as a diagram for their mission. Ian notices the pendant's similarity to the artifact he and Shiro looked for, talking Daigo into letting him look at it. Remembering the letter he father gave him is in book bag, Daigo realizes he left it back on the island as Torin takes him to get it. Later, while researching the pendant, Ian finds Debo Yakigonte as he calls the other Kyoryugers to aid him. However, having counted on their arrival as part of Dogold's plan, Debo Yakigonte creates copies of Kyoryu Black, Kyoryu Blue, Kyoryu Green, and Kyoryu Pink to turn the team on each other when they split ways to find him. Taking advantage of their lack of teamwork, Dogold attacks the Kyoryugers before Debo Yakigonte joins the fray. At the same time, after finding his father's farewell letter, Daigo finds himself facing Kaos and is restrained as the fiend tries to blast him. But at the last second, Torin arrives and sends Daigo to once more engage his mortal enemy. Finding the others arguing among themselves, Daigo falls for Debo Yakigonte's trap as he has a Zorima pose as Ian to destroy his pendant to incite Daigo's rage to completely break the team up. However, to the Debo Monster's shock, Daigo is unable to get mad as Debo Yakigonte accidentally exposes himself with Ian destroying his fake. With the team now back in synch and Debo Yakigonte's scheme revealed, the Kyoryugers defeat the Debo Monster. Back the island, Torin and Kaos's battle reaches its conclusion when the former learns the latter used Debo Yakigonte as a distraction in order to break the seal to release the Zyudenryu Pteragordon to serve him. Worried of the turn of events, Torin sends Gabutyra to form Kyoryuzin to battle the enlarged Debo Yakigonte and the Dogold copy he created from a Giant Zorima. Using the Ovirappoo Zyudenchi to disable them, Kyoryuzin Macho is formed to destroy the Giant Zorima and Debo Yakigonte. Later, while Torin is a bit relieved that his nemesis would not be able to use Pteragordon without a Kyoryuger, Kaos gives Dogold an altered Pteragordon Zyudenchi to use.
8	"Where Am I? Get Through the Maze"; Transliteration: "Kokodoko? Meiro o Buttobase" (Japanese: ココドコ？めいろをぶっとばせ)	April 7, 2013
While his teammates are at the Tiger Boy, Nobuharu reluctantly accompanies Yuko and Rika to an amusement park. As Yuko stresses the importance of being a family unit, Rika wanders off. Meanwhile, Torin's search for Pteragordon brings him to the amusement park where Nobuharu is. As Nobuharu and Yuko search for Rika, they come across some random people who are unusually sorrowful and wandering seemingly aimlessly. Suddenly, they find themselves in a forested mountain range, and Yuko herself unwittingly joins the ranks of the melancholy when sees an image of her late husband, Kenichi. Nobuharu realizes that everything around them is an illusion. When Nobuharu tries to break Yuko from the thrall of the illusory Kenichi, he is attacked by the illusion's creator, Debo Kokodoko. Nobuharu transforms into Kyoryu Blue to fight Kokodoko and the assembled Zorima, but is suddenly transported inside a haunted house. His transformation cancelled and unable to contact the other Kyoryugers for help, Nobuharu is forced to hide. He eventually escapes the haunted house and finds Rika, who is unaffected by Kokodoko's illusions. Nobuharu deduces that Rika's immunity stems from her acceptance that Kenichi has passed on. The other Kyoryugers finally make contact with him as Ian and Souji try to take down the barrier that Kokodoko put up around the park. Aigallon, who had been trying to harvest the sadness of those grieving over departed loved ones, arrives to try to stop the Kyoryugers from ruining his plans. Kyoryu Red and Kyoryu Pink hold off the Zorima off while Kyoryu Black and Kyoryu Green enlist Rika's help to try to break the barrier. Meanwhile, Nobuharu catches up to a tearful Yuko and confronts "Kenichi" with the first "oyaji" joke that he told to him. When "Kenichi" responds negatively, Nobuharu exposes him as a fake, reminding Yuko that the real Kenichi loved his "oyaji" jokes. Yuko realizes that Nobuharu is right and laughs as Nobuharu regales her with more "oyaji" jokes. Yuko's laughter breaks Kokodoko's illusion, and she faints once she and Nobuharu are back in the forest. Now that Yuko is safe, Nobuharu transforms and takes on Kokodoko. Kyoryu Green and Kyoryu Black, with Rika's help from inside, break down the barrier, freeing all those trapped inside Kokodoko's illusion. As the parkgoers, including Yuko, run to safety, the Kyoryugers take out the Zorima. Kyoryu Blue uses the Igeranodon Zyudenchi in combination with the Stegotchi Zyudenchi to defeat Kokodoko. However, the victory is short lived, as Pteragordon arrives and attacks the Kyoryugers. The Kyoryugers form Kyoryuzin Western to try to snap the wild Zyudenryu back to its senses. As Torin realizes with horror that Pteragordon is in Battle Mode, Luckyulo enlarges Kokodoko to support Pteragordon. Kyoryuzin Western takes on both adversaries at the same time, causing Kokodoko's destruction and Pteragordon's retreat. Dogold seethes as he vows to fully master the Zyudenryu. Later at the Tiger Boy, Yuko has made peace with Kenichi's passing, but despite admitting to a fleeting moment of gratitude towards Kyoryu Blue for rescuing her, she is still contemptuous of the sentai hero, stating that he is probably a loser in his forties, whose "oyaji" jokes are worse than Nobuharu's. Rika, Daigo, Amy, Ian, and Souji try hard to stifle their laughter as a vexed Nobuharu tries to refute Yuko's assertion.
9	"So Strong! PteraidenOh"; Transliteration: "Mecha Tsuyo! Puteraidenō" (Japanese: メチャつよ！プテライデンオー)	April 14, 2013
At the Spirit Base, Torin reveals Pteragordon was the Zyudenryu partner to Kyoryu Gold who died long ago because of Kaos and Dogold yet did not return as a Spirit. With Pteragordon wounded from the fight, a guilt ridden Torin seals the Zyudenryu in Gabutyra's volcano to recover before Kaos broke the seal and drafts Pteragordon to his services. Torin then alerts the Kyoryugers to Dogold leading an attack on the city to call out the Kyoryugers to vent his rage. Accompanying the Kyoryugers so he can avenge Kyoryu Gold, Torin confronts Dogold who has no memory of him as uses the Pteragordon Zyudenchi to have Pteragordon assume Battle Mode. While the others deal with the Zorima and trapped civilians, Kyoryu Red and Torin battle Dogold before Kyoryu Red manages to crack Dogold's face. Enraged enough to show his new power, Dogold enters Pteragordon as he has it transform into PteraidenOh to destroy everyone. Though formed to fight PteraidenOh, Kyoryuzin Parasagun Stegotchi is overpowered and barely won. Finding a human eye within the crack in his mask, a confused Dogold falls back with Kyoryu Green and Kyoryu Pink in pursuit. After Daigo's wounds are tended to, Torin reveals that Kyoryu Gold was a warrior of Japan's Sengoku period whose friends and family were targeted by Kaos and Dogold. But at last second, after the death of his friend Jūrōta, Kyoryu Gold stops Dogold from harming Torin and chases after him in a portal that he never emerged from. Though they now understand Torin, the issue of Dogold's lack of memory and that only true heroes use the Zyudenchi add further mystery. Eventually, Daigo and the others are alerted to their friends in danger and find Kaos's elite soldier Cambrima who has Souji and Amy captive. Though he demand, Cambrima is shocked when Daigo shot at him as he tells the monster that he counts on Souji and Amy before he Ian, and Nobuharu transform to fight him. With Dogold conflicted over what he should be angry about, Cambrima is forced to fight on his own before Kyoryu Red battles the Raging Knight before using the Fang Shot to completely shatter Dogold's mask. Seeing the human face behind the mask, Torin reveals it to be Kyoryu Gold: Utsusemimaru as the real Dogold is revealed to be animated armor. His disembodied face mask reformed, Dogold reveals how Kaos arranged the events years ago so he could enslave Utsusemimaru in his rage-filled mindset to control Pteragordon.
10	"Zandar! Gold Revival"; Transliteration: "Zandā! Gōrudo Fukkatsu" (Japanese: ザンダーッ！ゴールドふっかつ)	April 21, 2013
The Kyoryugers discover Dogold has been using Utsusemimaru, the Sengoku period's Kyoryu Gold, as his host. Repossessing Utsusemimaru, Dogold uses his host's signature Lightning Afterglow attack to defeat the three Kyoryugers with Kyoryu Black uses a Parasagun/Ovirappoo Zyudenchi combo so they can escape him and Cambrima. Returning to the Spirit Base to heal, Torin reveals he and that he was mortally wounded ages ago and could kill himself if he strains himself further. While leaving Ian and Nobuharu to find a Zyudenchi suitable to deal with Pteragordon, Daigo goes to Genryu to develop a counter to Utsusemimaru's signature move via sword training. Elsewhere, after Utsusemimaru attempted to free them, Amy manages to free herself and Souji as they contact Daigo being before cornered by Cambrima as Aigallon, Canderrilla, and Luckyulo arrive with a second Cambrima. After arriving and using the Beyonsmo Zyudenchi on Gabutyra to ground Pteragordon, Kyoryu Red fights Dogold while the male members are holding off other Deboth members as Kyoryu Pink ran off. During the fight, Torin then holds Dogold as he projects his Spirit to have Kyoryu Red use it in the Pteragordon Zyudenchi in an attack that can free Utsusemimaru. However, having learned of Torin's condition from Utsusemimaru, Kyoryu Pink manages to get Kyoryu Cyan to offer a hand. Though Dogold unaffected by the attack at first as he enters PteraidenOh, Utsusemimaru manages to break Dogold from the inside as PteraidenOh is purified. With Zorima surrounding him as he emerges, Utsusemimaru transforms into Kyoryu Gold to defeat them. When the Cambrima are enlarged, PteraidenOh destroys them. As the sun sets, finding Dogold's remains gone and recognizing Daigo as someone from his past, Utsusemimaru refuses to join him and walks off.
11	"Utchy! How Cool"; Transliteration: "Utchī! Kūru de Gozaru" (Japanese: ウッチー！クールでござる)	April 28, 2013
After witnessing Kaos give Dogold a new body with a newly created Cambrima, Canderrilla delights when she is able to carry out the next attack. At the Spirit Base, Torin is bothered by Utsusemimaru's behavior as Ramirez assures to him before leaving to resume his search for Bunpachy. Once Ramirez leaves, Torin senses Canderrilla as she has assumed a human form to have a concert so her Debo Monster, Debo Honenukki, can take her audience's thoracic vertebrae. When the Kyoryugers arrive, Canderrilla sicks her adoring public on the Kyoryugers as they manage to subdue them. Assuming her true form as the Kyoryugers transform, Canderrilla has Debo Honenukki deal with them for her before Kyoryu Gold arrives and drives them off. After scolding them, Amy takes it personally and she chases after him on a Deinochaser before discovering that it was actually a front and Utsusemimaru is a very bashful man. Treating his wounds, Amy learns from Utsusemimaru that Daigo reminds him of his lord Iwaizumi Mōshinosuke who fought by his side ages ago. Touched by Utsusemimaru's story, Amy vows to help him become a modern person. The next day, Amy and the others find that Canderrilla has attacked Nobuharu as he enables Debo Honenukki to make his team into Canderrilla's love slaves. But as Debo Honenukki is not good with women, Amy is unaffected, leaving her by herself to fight the Zorima and Debo Honenukki long enough for Utsusemimaru to arrive. With Utsusemimaru unaffected by Debo Honenukki due to his bashfulness, Kyoryu Pink takes the chance to destroy the Debo Monster's bone jar to restore all of his victims to normal. With Utsusemimaru acting tough as he transforms into Kyoryu Gold, he and Kyoryu Pink defeat Debo Honenukki. Enlarged by Luckyulo, Debo Honenukki is overpowered by PteraidenOh before it and Kyoryuzin destroy him. Later, contacting Amy, Utsusemimaru is happy that he did a good job and thanks her for helping him get out of his shell.
12	"Attack! The King and I"; Transliteration: "Buttobasso! Sessha to Kingu-dono" (Japanese: ブットバッソ！せっしゃとキングどの)	May 5, 2013
While watching a children's sumo match, with Daigo helping one of the participants despite his loss, Utsusemimaru remembers his past in a similar situation, all while maintaining his tough act. Soon after, the Kyoryugers are alerted to Daigo's young friend Tsuyoshi being kidnapped by a Debo Monster from Utusemimaru's time. As the other Kyoryugers deal with the Zorima, Kyoryu Gold makes his way to Debo Tangosekku before Kyoryu Red joins him, with the two Kyoryugers brought to a hidden village. Finding himself attacked by Debo Tangosekku and the children he turned into berserkers, and with his Zyudenchi powerless, Daigo is nearly killed by Dogold until Utsusemimaru arrives and covers his escape. Tending to Daigo's wounds, and revealing his resemblance to his old comrade Mōshinosuke, Utsusemimaru explains that killing Debo Tangosekku is the only way to restore the children to normal before he gives Daigo a drug to place him into a deep sleep so he can deal with the Debo Monster personally. However, using his Gaburivolver to keep himself awake, Daigo arrives to Utsusemimaru's aid and helps break Debo Tangosekku's spell. After bringing Utsusemimaru to his senses, Daigo finally wins his friendship as they defeat Debo Tangosekku's personal Zorima before Gabutyra arrives as the result of the combined Brave of the other Kyoryugers and Torin so the village can be negated. As Torin looks after the boys, the assembled Kyoryugers defeat the Zorima before taking out Debo Tangosekku with a Kentrospiker/Lightning Afterglow combo. Enlarged, Debo Tangosekku uses his red mist to overpower Kyoryuzin until Pteragordon arrives and combines with Kyoryuzin to form Raiden Kyoryuzin, finally destroying the Debo Monster. Later, the Kyoryugers start to regret what has happened when Utusemimaru starts acting like his usual self rather than the changed man that opened up to them.
13	"Jakireen! I'll Protect Your Heart"; Transliteration: "Jakirīn! Hāto o Mamorinuke" (Japanese: ジャキリーン！ハートをまもりぬけ)	May 12, 2013
Rin Katsuyama, manager of the kendo club at Souji's school, arrives at the Rippukan family dojo one morning with a bento for Souji. Souji, who has just finished sparring with Utsusemimaru, introduces him, Amy, and Daigo to Rin. Daigo thinks that Rin is Souji's girlfriend, but Souji says that she is not, which disappoints her. As Souji leaves for school with Rin, Utsusemimaru finds a note that had fallen from the bento that Rin had brought. Ian confirms the find as a love note from Rin to Souji, and the two decide to help bring Rin and Souji together by dressing as delinquents; they hope that Souji will jump to Rin's aid from them as they pretend to harass her. Unfortunately for Ian and Utsusemimaru, Amy ends up being the one to "protect" Rin, and Rin mistakenly assumes that Amy is Souji's girlfriend. Meanwhile, Debo Jakireen has been causing trouble with his Relationship-Cutting Shears, severing bonds between loving couples. Kyoryu Red and Kyoryu Blue confront Jakireen, who severs Kyoryu Red's bond of friendship with Kyoryu Blue, causing Kyoryu Red to become overly clingy towards Kyoryu Blue. Kyoryu Blue damages Jakireen's shears, bringing Kyoryu Red back to his senses and forcing Aigallon and Jakireen to retreat. After Luckyulo repairs his shears, Jakireen spots Rin as she, Ian, and Utsusemimaru find Souji out shopping with Amy. Heartbroken, Rin slaps Ian and runs off. Souji catches up to Rin to set things straight and to explain that he owes his friends a lot for helping him become a more open person than he used to be. Before Rin can admit her feelings to Souji, however, Jakireen snips her bond to Souji. Rin becomes obsessively possessive of Souji and tries to strangle him. Jakireen happens upon a nerdy boy pining after a schoolgirl who refuses to acknowledge him and gleefully moves to sever the boy's bond to the girl. However, Jakireen learns too late that the boy and schoolgirl are Nobuharu and Daigo in disguise and is caught off guard. Utsusemimaru destroys Jakireen's shears, restoring Rin to normal. Intending to make Aigallon pay for what happened to Rin, Kyoryu Green defeats Jakireen with Kyoryu Gold's help. Kyoryuzin is formed to take on the Giant Zorima that has joined the skirmish, but is overwhelmed when an enlarged Jakireen joins the fray. PteraidenOh evens the odds, combining with Parasagun and Zakutor to form PteraidenOh Western. As Kyoryuzin destroys the Giant Zorima, PteraidenOh Western finishes off Debo Jakireen. As school comes to an end, Souji gives Rin a present as thanks for her friendship over the years, explaining that Amy had helped him pick it out. However, before Rin can confess her feelings, Souji gives a similar present to the kendo club assistant manager. Rin become incensed and Daigo, Amy, Ian, Nobuharu, and Utsusemimaru rush in to rescue Souji from angry Rin.
14	"Watch Out! The Spirit Base"; Transliteration: "Abunaāi! Supiritto Bēsu" (Japanese: あぶなァーい！スピリットベース)	May 19, 2013
Amy finds herself in deep trouble as Gentle wants her to focus less on being a Kyoryuger and more on being a lady as it is interfering with her social life. At the same time, while reading Shōjo Cosmic issue 9 and dismay at the cliffhanger, Luckyulo finds himself in trouble with Kaos, who creates Debo Kibishidesu to keep him in line as they go after the Spirit Base. The next day, after a mandatory class to understand the plan with the Super Dimension Bomb, Luckyulo learns that the entrance to the Spirit Base has been found. After being taken to the entrance, punished from failing to understand why he can not access it, Luckyulo finds Amy dealing with her own issues with Gentle as Utsusemimaru arrives to aid in her training. But once Gentle and Utsusemimaru leave, Amy reverts to her lazy habits as Debo Kibishidesu loses it and goes after her to correct her improper behavior while Luckyulo runs off with her Gaburivolver, leaving a Giant Zorima behind. After the Zyudenryu take out the grunts, with Torin arriving soon after, Utsusemimaru reveals what has happened with the Kyoryugers easing Gentle's guilt as they promise to help him find Amy. But once Utsusemimaru mentions that the spy has her Gaburivolver, Torin senses that Luckyulo has infiltrated the Spirit Base. The others head back to protect it while Utsusemimaru and Gentle use the GPS implanted on Amy to find her, just as Debo Kibishidesu is about to discipline her. Utsusemimaru becomes Kyoryu Gold to fight the Debo Monster while Gentle frees Amy from her confines. Though Debo Kibishidesu has knowledge on him and his weapons now, Kyoryu Gold overwhelms the Debo Monster and defeats him, much to his shock. Elsewhere, Luckyulo places the Super Dimension Bomb in the Zyudenchi Charge Box but finds Amy's copy of Shōjo Cosmic issue 10 and frets over reading it. It is then that Torin and the other Kyoryugers arrive, chasing Luckyulo around the Spirit Base as he loses the Gaburivolver and escapes just as Amy and Utsusemimaru arrive. Amy presents an idea to save the base just as she regains her Gaburivolver, the Kyoryugers use Raiden Kyoryuzin to send the Super Dimension Bomb into Earth's stratosphere. Later, Luckyulo ends up getting punished by Kaos upon finding the entrance to the Spirit Base gone as Torin altered the remaining entrances to activate only in the presence of a Gaburivolver. Though Amy understands Gentle's intentions, she resumes her unladylike mannerisms much to everyone's dismay before Gentle calls Amy.
15	"How Annoying! Dogold's Ambition"; Transliteration: "Haradatashii ze! Dogorudo no Yabō" (Japanese: はらだたしいぜッ！ドゴルドのやぼう)	May 26, 2013
Arriving at the Future Technology Institute for an odd job in organizing old records, Nobuharu meets his old friend Hiroshi Nakazato who is working on the G-BO robot. Nearby, Dogold is confronted by Kyoryu Gold before being forced to run off as the Cambrima he is possessing has reached its limit. With Utsusemimaru helping him as the others are told to stand back to keep Yuko in the dark about his status as a Kyoryuger, Nobuharu learns about G-BO from Nakazato who looks down on him upon realizing he gave up his global trade career for a pitiful job. In turn, Nakazato's rage over being surrounded by idiots causes the G-BO to activate as it tries to kill Nobuharu with Dogold encouraging Nakazato's rage. The Kyoryugers gathered to deal with the released Cambrima as Luckyulo takes G-BO back into the institute. With Kyoryu Red using the Archenolon Zyudenchi to try to slow things down, Nobuharu arrives too late to stop G-BO's final upgrade as Dogold reveals he has given Nakazato the emotion responding chip so he can convert G-BO into his new body. After being reminded by Nobuharu of the promise that he made to help people regardless of their jobs, Nakazato shuts down G-BO with Dogold being forced to enter one of the Cambrima once more. Transforming to join his teammates as they take out the Zorima, Kyoryu Blue battles Dogold before defeating the Cambrima with Kyoryu Gold's help. With Kyoryuzin Macho ineffective against the Cambrima, PteraidenOh provides aid by combining with Ankydon to become PteraidenOh Ankydon to wound the monster so Kyoryuzin can finish the Cambrima off. Though Kaos assures Dogold he can provide an endless amount of Cambrima, Dogold sees that a body like Utsusemimaru's is the only way to ever truly calm down.
16	"Dig-a-dug! My Treasure"; Transliteration: "Mogumogūn! Ore no Takaramono" (Japanese: モグモグーン！おれのたからもの)	June 2, 2013
Using her Joyful Song, Canderrilla lured a group of men with the allure of treasure as Aigallon arrives and learns it is a ploy for her plan to gather happiness from her arranged treasure hunt. At that time, with only use of the Deinosgrander Zyudenchi unaccounted for, the Kyoryugers arrive and thwart Canderrilla's plan. After getting the people to safety, with Aigallon noticing Daigo's pendant, the Kyoryugers fight Canderrilla's Debo Monster, Debo Zaihon, as Aigallon joins the fray to have Kyoryu Red to himself so he can have his pendant. As Kyoryu Gold arrives to give their teammates an advantage on Debo Zaihon, Kyoryu Black finds Daigo being held by Aigallon as he compared the youth's pendant to his prized jewel: the jewel that Ian and Shiro searched for. Upon learning that Aigallon is the one who killed Shiro and not Debo Doronboss, a furious Kyoryu Black attacks the knight with extreme prejudice before Debo Zaihon arrives and buries Daigo, Kyoryu Pink, and Kyoryu Gold under his stone slabs. Using the Pukuptor Zyudenchi on Kyoryu Blue, the three Kyoryugers return to the Spirit Base to regroup before planning the rescue of their teammates. However, fearing he would lose his cool again, Ian decides to stay back for a bit. As he tells Nobuharu and Torin go ahead of him, Souji tells Ian that they will wait for him. Knowing what to do, as Kyoryu Blue, Kyoryu Green, and Torin deal with Debo Zaihon and Luckyulo, Kyoryu Black arrives with the Deinosgrander Zyudenchi and attempts to use it. Though it failed as Aigallon attacks him, Kyoryu Black learns he can use the Deinosgrander with the Armed On and uses it to force his way through the villains before breaking through the slabs and getting his teammates out. Confirming Daigo's pendant and his jewel are linked, Aigallon loses his treasure to Kyoryu Green as Daigo transforms to join his team in defeating Debo Zaihon with a Kentrospiker/Deinosgrander combo. Enlarged by Luckyulo, Debo Zaihon overwhelms Kyoryuzin and Pteragordon before they combine Raiden Kyoryuzin to finish the Debo Monster off. As the Kyoryugers ponder on the relation between Daigo's pendant and Ian's gemstone, Torin is sure that they will learn the full story of the past.
17	"Serious! Kyoryu Gray"; Transliteration: "Gachi da ze! Kyōryū Gurē" (Japanese: ガチだぜ！キョウリュウグレー)	June 9, 2013
Finding themselves facing a group of Zorima as numerous as the day they first appeared, the Kyoryugers learn that their usual attacks have no effect on the horde as Torin fears the worse of what this means. Once they destroy the Zorima, the Kyoryugers find themselves facing an even stronger Debo Monster: Debo Nagareboshi. Luckily, Kyoryu Gold's aid drives Debo Nagareboshi back. In the Spirit Base, Torin reveals that the power boost the Zorima had is a sign that Deboth, the leader of the Deboth Army, is beginning to awaken. Curious of how to deal with this series of events, the Kyoryugers are formally introduced to Kyoryu Gray, a Spirit from China. Admitting that he is disappointed in the main Kyoryugers' ability as he watched them fighting Debo Nagareboshi, he places the five in an illusion to put them through a series of trials in his arena while subjected to the Guardians' power. While Ian, Nobuharu, Souji, and Amy pass after respectively suffering the attacks Ovirappoo, Igeranodon, Archenolon, and Gurumonite Zyudenchi, they find Daigo was subjected to all four Zyudenchi at once and passed his test first. Elsewhere, after paying his respect to his fallen Zetsumates comrades, Debo Nagareboshi heads out to get revenge on the Kyoryugers. Kyoryu Gray tells Utusemimaru not to participate in the fight, and instead decides to use the Debo Monster as a final test for the main Kyoryugers. With Dogold benefitting from his power up as he accompanies the Debo Monster, Kyoryu Black, Kyoryu Blue, Kyoryu Green, and Kyoryu Pink overwhelm him and Debo Nagareboshi with their newfound will to fight. However, as Kyoryu Gray has expected, Kyoryu Red's attacks has no effect on Debo Nagareboshi, and Kyoryu Gold is forced to intervene as the Giant Zorima are formed. Luckily, Bunpachy arrives and defeats the monster much to the Kyoryugers' surprise. As Bunpachy leaves, Kyoryu Gray tells the Kyoryugers that his Zyudenryu has accepted all of them but Daigo. He explains that Daigo's lack of weakness makes him imbalanced, and Kyoryu Gray intends to give the Kyoryugers Bunpachy only if Daigo is removed from the team and Utsusemimaru made leader.
18	"Caught! Kung-Fu Strike"; Transliteration: "Tsukanda! Kanfū Hissatsuken" (Japanese: つかんだッ！カンフーひっさつけん)	June 23, 2013
Though the others come to his hospital bed to see how he is faring since their last fight with Debo Nagareboshi, Daigo is actually on top of the building pondering Kyoryu Gray's words. Daigo is visited by Torin, who explains that Kyoryu Gray is the first Kyoryuger and fought his feelings of fearing for his loved ones over the years. At that time, Kyoryu Gray jumps Daigo and defeat him in a fight while explaining that he is a fearless. Before leaving, Kyoryu Gray gives him the chance to prove his worth to him at the Dusk Forest. Once at the Dusk Forest, Daigo encounters an illusion of Debo Nagareboshi before it turns into Kyoryu Gray who knocks him into the river. Upon coming to, Daigo encounters a fisherman who tells him that those who have no fear are foolhardy. Remembering Torin's words about Kyoryu Gray, Daigo goes back up the mountain where he encounters the illusion of his father and then realizes his fear as the illusions disappear just as his friends arrive. The reunion is short-lived when Torin reveals that Utsusemimaru has been defeated by an even stronger Debo Nagareboshi and is now being held captive by him and Dogold. However, Kyoryu Gray impedes the Kyoryugers' path so Daigo can finally prove himself worthy. Upon managing to crack Kyoryu Gray's helmet, Daigo reveals that his fear is losing the friends he has made as a Kyoryuger. With Daigo having proven his worth, Kyoryu Gray lets him pass to save Utsusemimaru. During the ensuing fight, while Kyoryu Gold defeats Dogold and the others take out the Zorima, Kyoryu Red manages to disarm Debo Nagareboshi before finishing him off with the Kentrospiker. When Debo Nagareboshi is enlarged, Kyoryuzin Macho finds itself unable to fight. The fisherman appears once more, revealing himself to be Tessai as he transforms into Kyoryu Gray and gives Kyoryu Red the Bunpachy Zyudenchi. With Bunpachy joining the fray, Kyoryuzin Macho exchanges Dricera for the new Zyudenryu to become Kyoryuzin Kung-Fu and overwhelms Debo Nagareboshi before destroying him. Later, noting that Kyoryu Gray left without saying goodbye, the Kyoryugers intend to make use of his teachings to put their feelings into his attacks. Back in China, welcomed back by Kyoryu Cyan, Kyoryu Gray tells him that Plezuon will soon reveal itself as the two depart to find the final Zyudenryu Bragigas.
19	"Kywaeen! Kidnapped Family"; Transliteration: "Kyawaīn! Ubawareta Famirī" (Japanese: キャワイーン！うばわれたファミリー)	June 30, 2013
While training, Utsusemimaru finds himself in a predicament with the overprotective parents of a spoiled boy named Yuuji. Later finding Yuuji, Utsusemimaru tries to get Yuuji to be independent but finds himself at the boy's mercy. But once taking Yuuji to his house, Utsusemimaru finds the boy replaced by an adorable Debo Monster named Debo Kyawaeen. Finding Aigallon to be behind it, Utsusemimaru transforms yet finds himself unable to fight Debo Kyawaeen before she overwhelms him in her true form. However, as the other Kyoryugers arrive, only Kyoryu Red inflicts damage on Debo Kyawaeen as Aigallon and Luckyulo get her to safety. Taking the tun of events hard as the other Kyoryugers learn that Debo Kyawaeen took other doting parents, Utsusemimaru tries to convince Yuuji to be independent. The next day, Yuuji is captured by Luckyulo and taken to Debo Kyawaeen to be subjected to watching his parents fawn over her. However, expecting this, Utsusemimaru arrives but finds as the parents grab him while Yuuji is knocked down. Utsusemimaru convinces the boy to get back up as Yuuji retrieves the man's Gaburi Changer. Shocking the parents while driving Aigallon and Luckyulo away, Utsusemimaru is joined by the other Kyoryugers as he transforms. During the fight, Debo Kyawaeen bewitches Kyoryu Black to fight for him with Kyoryu Pink by subjecting the Zorima to the Stymero Zyudenchi to hold Debo Kyawaeen so Kyoryu Gold can finish all of them off in one hit. With Kyoryu Black returned to normal, Debo Kyawaeen uses the stolen Sukusuku Joylo on herself as she proceeds to fight PteraidenOh before becoming PteraidenOh Bunpachy to finish the Debo Monster off. The next day, Utsusemimaru is visited by a changed Yuuji as he makes his way to school.
20	"Unluckyu! The Tanabata Windfall"; Transliteration: "Anrakkyū! Tanabata no Tanabota" (Japanese: アンラッキュー！タナバタのタナボタ)	July 7, 2013
On the eve of Tanabata, the Kyoryugers spend time with Nobuharu's family. Amy wishes to pass her upcoming German exam, Souji wishes for a new bokken, Utsusemimaru wishes for a lot of frozen treats, Ian wishes to find the fossilized remains of an undiscovered species, but Nobuharu keeps his wish a secret. Only Daigo has nothing to wish for on a slip of Tanabata paper, but there is one thing he wants. The next day, strange things happen when peoples' Tanabata wishes come true, and then they collapse. Following the path of people, the Kyoryugers encounter the Debo Monster Debo Tanabanta. With Canderrilla and Luckyulo arriving to join Tanabanta, they reveal it is he who has been granting the wishes. However, as seen with Ian, Souji, and Amy, those who have their wishes granted start to weaken and eventually die the next day. Debo Tanabanta reveals that the bamboo tube on his chest contains the joy energy he has amassed before leaving the Kyoryugers behind. Later, though thinking he will be safe from Tanabanta in the Spirit Base, Utusemimaru gets his Tanabata wish granted when Kyoryu Cyan makes a visit with a box of frozen treats he got while searching for Bragigas in Belgium. Nobuharu also gets his wish to get his hands on ladies fulfilled when he unknowingly allows Rika's teacher and her peers to hold his hands in gratitude. Upon finding Debo Tanabanta using Nobuharu's Tanabata wish paper, Daigo finds himself outmatched by him, Canderrilla, and Luckyulo before the Debo Monster runs off. Daigo chasing after Debo Tanabanta as the sun rises, and when he finds the monster, he sees his father punching Debo Tanabanta to destroy his bamboo tube. With their lives restored, the Kyoryugers find Daigo as his father tells him to continue down the path he chosen. Happy that the wish he made on a star on Tanabata came true, Daigo and the others transform to defeat Debo Tanabanta with the Kentrospiker. Then, with Pteragordon backing them up, Kyoryuzin Kung-Fu destroys Debo Tanabanta and his Giant Zorima backup. Back at the Spirit Base, the gang talk about Daigo's good mood as Torin returns with a bag looking like the one his father had when he saw the fight with Debo Tanabanta.
21	"Zuon! Plezuon Returns"; Transliteration: "Zuōn! Kaettekita Purezuon" (Japanese: ズオーン！かえってきたプレズオン)	July 14, 2013
At the Spirit Base, the Kyoryugers are notified that the ninth Zyudenryu Plezuon is returning from space alongside its partner Kyoryu Violet. However, Plezuon is attacked while re-entering Earth's atmosphere. Arriving at the seaside crash site to find it has crashed into the ocean, the Kyoryugers are attacked by the Zetsumates who Kaos has resurrected to stop Plezuon's return. As the others deal with the Zetsumates and their Deboth MetsuBall attack, Kyoryu Red attempts to reach Plezuon but cannot swim. Luckily, he is saved by Kyoryu Violet who reveals that Plezuon has entered their undersea base before he tells Kyoryu Red to aid his friends as they escape the Zetsumates. With Torin guiding them, the Kyoryugers arrive at the Plezuon Lab where they meet the eccentric Doctor Woorushade and his granddaughter Yayoi. Feeling that they have heard his voice before, the Kyoryugers learn that Woorushade is the inventor of the Gaburivolvers before Daigo asks him where Kyoryu Violet is. But before Torin can reveal who Kyoryu Violet is, he senses the Zetsumates resuming their attack to lure the Kyoryugers out. Using multiple MetsuBalls to disarm the Kyoryugers, the Zetsumates have the upper hand before Woorushade arrives and reveals himself as Kyoryu Violet. But with his back out from his introduction, the Kyoryugers are forced to protect Kyoryu Violet before Torin takes him to safety while they intercept a MetsuBall and use it to defeat the Zetsumates. With Debo Nagareboshi enlarged, Kyoryu Violet gives Kyoryu Red the Plezuon Zyudenchi, as he intended earlier, to launch Plezuon to battle. Taking the fight to space, Plezuon transforms into PlezuOh to destroy Debo Nagareboshi. Despite this setback, Kaos reveals an ulterior motive as he requests Dogold's aid while contacting the others and the surviving Zetsumates to find Plezuon Lab and destroy it.
22	"Im-poss-i-ble! Deboth Resurrects"; Transliteration: "Ma-sa-ka! Dēbosu Fukkatsu" (Japanese: ま・さ・か！デーボスふっかつ)	July 21, 2013
After revealing the amount of emotion they gathered is lacking rage and joy, Kaos reveals his intention to revive Deboth and requests Dogold's aid. To that end, as Aigallon and Canderrilla are about to find Plezuon Lab with the aid of Zetsumate's clone, Dogold takes Debo Viruson and Luckyulo's Sukusuku Joylo to enact part of Kaos's scheme. At Plezuon Lab, with Dr. Woorushade still in the hospital, Yayoi reveals that her grandfather visited a dead planet that was home to a insectoid race before Deboth exterminated them. She explains that Dr. Woorushade gathered the data needed to create a Deboth Cell Destruction Program to make Plezuon into force that can wipe out Deboth. After Utsusemimaru notices Amy's attitude and questions her if she likes Daigo, Torin senses Dogold's actions as he and Kyoryugers face him and his summoned forces as Debo Wilson producing an endless supply of Restoration Water. By that time, as Debo Computer Viruson knocks Yayoi out, Torin realizes the Deboth Army's scheme as Kaos arrives with the Frozen Castle. With Torin revealing the Frozen Castle to be Deboth itself as it is dipped into the dam, Dogold keeps the Kyoryugers and Torin while Debo Viruson dives into the dam to enlarge to hold Kyoryuzin Western at bay. Though Kyoryuzin Western attempts to kill him, Deboth is fully revived as he assimilates Debo Viruson with Debo Computer Viruson ceasing to be. With the Zyudenryu fearful of their new enemy except for Gabutyra, Kyoryuzin Western is easily defeated as Raiden Kyoryuzin is formed. Coming to as Aigallon, Canderrilla, Luckyulo, and Debo Hyogakki begin wrecking Plezuon Lab, Yayoi finds Plezuon unable to move.
23	"Go! Bakuretsu Kyoryuzin"; Transliteration: "Tate! Bakuretsu Kyōryūjin" (Japanese: たてッ！バクレツキョウリュウジン)	July 28, 2013
Finally awakened, as Dogold meets up with the other knights, Deboth overwhelms Raiden Kyoryuzin before cancelling its formation. However, piloting the combination on his own, Kyoryu Red personally pilots Kyoryuzin Kung-Fu before his Brave was starting to glow then frighten Deboth as the monster attacks the Deboth officers. Luckily, Kaos gives Luckyulo a special pellet to syphon the Restoration Water from Deboth to shrink him to normal size and be restrained. When asked about their creator's mindset, Kaos reveals that Deboth's revival was incomplete and thus lacks a full understanding of emotion while asking Aigallon if he and the others have fulfilled their mission. Coming to, learning that Torin had brought them all and the Zyudenryu to the Spirit Base, Daigo reveals Deboth's mentality. Telling the others to take it easy, despite being hurt himself, Daigo heads off to check on Yayoi. Finding herself on the beach, having been teleported to safety by Plezuon, Yayoi learns as she is cornered by the Deboth Army who intend to finish the job. Luckily, Daigo arrives and gets Yayoi to safety with the Pukuptor Zyudenchi. Though feeling guilt that she left Plezuon immobilized, Daigo explains that the Zyudenryu has faith that she can fix it. When Kaos enlarges Deboth to finish Plezuon, Daigo confronts the monster as Yayoi returns to Plezuon Lab to complete the upgrade. With the other Kyoryugers arriving as he transforms with them, Kyoryu Red drives off their human sized opposition before aiding Gabutyra and Bunpachy against Deboth. Diving into the Zyudenryu to add her Brave into the dormant program, Yayoi barely pilot Plezuon as it transforms into PlezuOh. At PlezuOh's suggestion, Kyoryu Red combines it with Gabutyra and Bunpachy to form Bakuretsu Kyoryuzin with Deboth destroyed as Torin believes that they have emerged victorious.
24	"Burn! The Seven Kyoryugers"; Transliteration: "Moero! Shichinin no Kyōryūjā" (Japanese: もえろ！7にんのキョウリュウジャー)	August 4, 2013
Celebrating the defeat of Deboth, though Torin feels that the Kyoryugers must also eliminate the surviving Deboth Army members, Daigo is in the hospital as Yayoi is perplexed about becoming the new Kyoryu Violet since jumping into Plezuon. But after the others find out, finding herself unable to use the Plezuon Zyudenchi, Yayoi runs off with Amy in pursuit. Remembering how her grandfather saved her before crying over her inability to become a Kyoryuger like him, Yayoi finds herself being frozen by Debo Hyogakki who reveals his revenge-driven Freeze-cry Tactic. Luckily, Amy comes to Yayoi's aid with the others joining in as Daigo actually leaves the hospital. However, now running on rage instead of his usual sadness, a vengeful Aigallon enables Debo Hyogakki to spirit off Yayoi while Canderrilla gives him a power boost before self destructing to take the present Kyoryugers with him. Fortunately, Daigo and Torin find Amy who reveals that Ian uses the Tuperanda Zyudenchi on them and the others to escape Aigallon's suicide attack. As Torin looks for the others, Daigo and Amy find Yayoi with the former deals with Cambrima while the latter is overwhelmed by Debo Hyogakki while talking to Yayoi. Remembering that she wanted to become Kyoryuger out of her own desire, Yayoi finally activates the Plezuon Zyudenchi and saves Amy as they are joined by the other Kyoryugers. Joining the others as their transform, Yayoi becomes Kyoryu Violet and defeats the Zorima single handed before defeating Debo Hyogakki so the others can finish him off. With Luckyulo enlarging Debo Hyogakki, PlezuOh Bunpachy is formed and defeats two of the Debo Monster's Giant Zorima before forming Bakuretsu Kyoryuzin to wipe both Debo Hyogakki and his support out in one hit. Soon after, taken by Doctor Woorushade to rebuild his lab and undergo training, Yayoi recognizes a confused Amy as her rival. Elsewhere, carrying a still unconscious Canderrilla, Luckyulo questions their fate until they are sucked into what the latter learns to be the Frozen Castle as it resettles in the ocean floor.
25	"What's This! The Deboth Army's Nightmare"; Transliteration: "Nani Kore! Dēbosu Gun no Akumu" (Japanese: ナニコレ！デーボスぐんのあくむ)	August 11, 2013
With the Deboth Army down to Canderrilla and Luckyulo, the Kyoryugers are told to find the two despite them being nearly harmless. However, for the next three days, Souji finds himself in a nightmare with Luckyulo posing as Katsuyama and getting the Kendo club to beat him up. Telling Amy, Souji then learns that Daigo, Ian, and Nobuharu have similar nightmares of Luckyulo dressed as a girl and sicking people on them. Torin then senses a newly matured batch of Zorima, with Kyoryu Pink being the only Kyoryuger able to fend the monsters off as Kyoryu Gold is also revealed to have been nightmares of Luckyulo posing as Mōshinosuke. Upon waking him up, the Kyoryugers learn that Luckyulo has been invading their dreams with the aid of Debo Akkumuun before the villains manage to get Kyoryu Pink. Though Kyoryu Pink is woken up with the Ovirapoo Zyudenchi, Luckyulo and Debo Akkumuun can now enter their dreams freely to mess them up. Forced to stay awake to avoid being attacked, Souji resolves to training to find a way of bypassing Debo Akkumuun's defenses. The next day, Souji learns that Nobuharu is sleeping. On his way out, Souji is found by Katsuyama as she gives him a disgusting energy drink that enables him to enact his plan and defeat Debo Akkumuun. Giving Katsuyama's drink to the others, the Kyoryugers speed up their transformation and roll call and quickly waste Debo Akkumuun. Though enlarged, Debo Akkumuun is overwhelmed by Plezuon as it transforms into PlezuOh while Kyoryuzin Stegotchi Zakutor and PteraidenOh are formed with the three taking out the Debo Monster. Though they corner Luckyulo, the Kyoryugers find the Frozen Palace appearing with Kaos, Dogold, and Aigallon emerging alongside a conscious Canderrilla. Revealing that Deboth transferred his heart into him and he saved Aigallon at the last second, Kaos explains that Luckyulo's actions have given them the means to defeat the Kyoryugers and evolve Deboth before he and his forces depart. As Souji unintentionally offends Katsuyama in his attempt to thank her for the drink, Kaos creates an embodiment of pure resentment to counter the Kyoryugers.
26	"Oh My! The Gabutyra Human"; Transliteration: "Bikkuri! Gabutira Ningen" (Japanese: ビックリ！ガブティラにんげん)	August 18, 2013
While telling Ian that Torin expected the Deboth Army was not truly defeated as they believed, Daigo admits he needs to talk to Torin about the mysterious sack. However, Torin alerts them to Dogold attacking the city. Confronting Dogold, Kyoryu Red and Kyoryu Black meet the Deboth Army's newest member: the Resentful Knight Endolf. Endolf overpowers the assembled Kyoryugers before he and Dogold get into an altercation and are teleported back to the Frozen Castle where Endolf decides to work with Aigallon. Back at the Spirit Base, Yayoi arrives with the new Zyudenchi that she and her grandfather developed to aid Kyoryu Red. However, when Kyoryu Red uses it, he starts acting like Gabutyra. As Yayoi attempts to find out what happened, Aigallon arrives with Endolf to provoke Ian using Shiro's death. But as the fight goes underway, Aigallon suddenly acts strange during his fight with Kyoryu Black before Kyoryu Red intervenes and then runs off. As the female members give chase on the Deinochasers, the male Kyoryugers fall back with Kyoryu Gold's attack. When the gang regroups with him nowhere to be found, Torin comes to the conclusion that the new Zyudenchi must have overridden Daigo's mind to believe that he is a dinosaur. Reluctant of being named temporary leader out of fear of losing his friends, Ian is given courage by Amy before they see Aigallon and Endolf resuming their attack. Learning that Daigo is still there despite the Zyudenchi's influence, Ian's feelings of hatred disappear as he and the other transform to fight the Deboth knights. While the others fight Endolf, Kyoryu Black battles Aigallon with Kyoryu Pink's aid. But taking Luckyulo's Sukusuku Joylo, Endolf enlarges himself with the Plezuon arriving and the Kyoryugers form PlezuOh Parasagun to fight the Deboth knight. Overwhelming Endolf, the Kyoryugers exchange Parasagun for Zakutor so PlezuOh Zakutor can deal the final blow. However, the attack fails as Endolf has Luckyulo shrink him so they can fall back. Later, with Ian accepting the temporary leadership position, the Kyoryugers learn of Kyoryu Red's location.
27	"O Matsurincho! Red's Super Evolution"; Transliteration: "O Matsurincho! Reddo Chō Shinka" (Japanese: オ・マツリンチョ！レッドちょうしんか)	September 1, 2013
After a failed attempt to catch the feral Kyoryu Red, and Gabutyra fretting over being unable to help due to its size, Ian gets an idea and leaves to see Yayoi on the matter of Gabutyra's feelings. The search party are then attacked by Debo Shinobinba and Debo Karyudosu who Endolf had created to help him seek out Kyoryu Red. The four are overpowered with Debo Shinobinba sealing their transformation devices with the powerless Kyoryugers fighting the Zorima as Endolf and his hunting party take their leave. Upon learning of the new turn of events, Kyoryu Black acts quickly against the situation before his transformation is cancelled and sealed. However, with Utsusemimaru forced into acting out a deception that he has an alternate way to transform, the Kyoryugers distract the hunting party long enough for Kyoryu Red to escape. Kyoryu Red is eventually grabbed by Torin who risks his life to restore Daigo to his mentality. Learning of what has transpired, despite Torin pleading him not to go, Daigo comes to the others' aid with his own Gaburivolver sealed. However, telling the others to stand aside as he rips his shirt off, Daigo fights the Zorima on his own. By then, Yayoi arrives to hold off Debo Shinobinba and Debo Karyudosu as she tells Daigo to give the Zyudenchi to Gabutyra - this causes Gabutyra to shrink into a miniaturized form which Amy calls "Minityra" that represents Gabutyra's desire to fight with Daigo. Once transformed now that his transformation is unsealed, Kyoryu Red turns Minityra into the special power-up transformation device Gabutyra de Carnival to transformation into a new form that he christens as Kyoryu Red Carnival. With Debo Shinobinba's Debo Ninpo ineffective against him, Kyoryu Red Carnival defeats him which results in the other Kyoryugers' own transformation devices being unsealed. Though enlarged by Luckyulo as he came for Endolf, Debo Shinobinba is destroyed by Bakuretsu Kyoryuzin. Brought before Kaos, Endolf learns they are going after Torin as part of a plan to gather a large amount of malice.
28	"Ah Torin! The Hundred Million-Year-Old Grudge"; Transliteration: "Aa Torin! Ichi-oku-nen no Urami" (Japanese: ああトリン！１おくねんのうらみ)	September 8, 2013
Finding Canderrilla as she attempts to win a pop star contract with an agent, Endolf recruits her to aid him in a scheme. Elsewhere, while looking for a troubled Torin, Daigo ends up meeting his father and is given a bag of amber stones. Revealing to Daigo that Torin is in Valley of Calming Winds, Dantetsu asks his son if he is ready to believe in Torin. Finding Torin, Daigo learns that their mentor is a friend of his father yet could not get Torin to reveal what he is hiding. Torin senses Debo Karyudosu attacking with the Kyoryugers quickly hurrying to the scene. However Dogold reveals that the attack is a distraction as Endolf has captured Torin by having Canderrilla sing a dark version of her Joyful Song that effects their mentor. Arriving to watch Torin's wing get cut off before Kaos, the Kyoryugers fight Endolf and Debo Karyudosu while Kyoryu Red battles Kaos before Torin suddenly starts attacking them. Defeated by Torin as he begs them to run away from him, the Kyoryugers learn from Kaos that Torin is actually a member of the Deboth Army who betrayed their creator. Summoning Luckyulo, Kaos borrows and gives the Sukusuku Joylo to Endolf to enlarge Torin so the Kyoryugers could not deny the truth. While the others are shocked, Daigo remembers his father's words and tells the others to form Kyoryuzin to save Torin from his pain while Kyoryu Gold attempts to take a Shukushuku Ball. But during the fight, Torin regains enough control of himself to force Kyroryuzin's sword through his body.
29	"Big Attack! Dance Carnival"; Transliteration: "Daigekitotsu! Odore Kānibaru" (Japanese: だいげきとつ！おどれカーニバル)	September 15, 2013
After fatally wounding himself, Torin tells the Kyoryugers that he is fine, while revealing how he came to protect Earth rather than destroy it before giving his farewells. Back on the ground, Utsusemimaru gets aid from Tessai while Ramirez wrestles a Shukushuku Ball out of Luckyulo so the samurai can use it to shrink Torin before his body petrifies. With Yayoi and others taking Torin's death hard, Daigo tells them not to harbor a grudge as he gives Torin his amber pendant while revealing his father has been gathering them. Ramirez and Tessai reveal the amber stones are fragments needed to find Bragigas as they glow in Torin's presence, inspiring the Kyoryugers to take him to the Spirit Base to revive him. However, with Dogold strangely wanting to help, Endolf finds the Kyoryugers. While Ramirez, Tessai, and Yayoi hold off Endolf and the Zorima and Kyoryu Gold fends off Dogold and Debo Karyudosu, the five main Kyoryugers take Torin to the Spirit Base. Though it appears the gathered stones are not working, Amy senses a melody from Torin that Daigo recognizes as the Dino Soul song. With the five Kyoryugers singing it, they manage to revive Torin. Given his pendant back, Daigo gets an idea from the song to deal with Endolf. As the others return to aid Kyoryu Gold against Debo Karyudosu, with Dogold suddenly falling back, Daigo comes to the other Kyoryugers' aid. Upon telling Endolf that carnivals can drive away ill feelings, Daigo transforms into Kyoryu Red Carnival and uses the Stegotchi and Dricera Zyudenchi to become Kyoryu Red Samba Carnival. After taking out the grunts as Macho Carnival, Kung-Fu Carnival, and Western Carnival, Kyoryu Red Samba Carnival finishes off Endolf while the others destroy the Zorima and Debo Karyudosu. Though he barely survives, Endolf learns that Dogold played him so he cannot fight back as he takes over his body. Later, as the Kyoryugers still see him as a friend and ally, Torin is moved to the point of tears.
30	"Give It to Me! The Guardians' Fragment"; Transliteration: "Te ni Irero! Gādianzu no Kakera" (Japanese: てにいれろ！ガーディアンズのかけら)	September 22, 2013
Now knowing that collecting the Lost Stones, the remains of the Guardians, is the only way to get Bragigas, the Kyoryugers decide to play an active role in the search. Amy then suddenly remembers seeing another one of the Lost Stones in her friend Mitsuhiko Kanna's estate, as he is holding his birthday party that weekend. They go to see Mitsuhiko to try to ask for the Lost Stone, revealed to be Stymero's, but he declines after seeing how Souji acts around Amy, forcing them to participate in a party game with treasure chests containing the possible points they have won for a particular prize. Kaos tasks Luckyulo to also join in, and while trying to remember Debo Doronboss, who would be useful in this quest, until Aigallon reminds Luckyulo of Debo Zaihon, resulting in the hybrid Debo Zaihodoron. As the party begins, Luckyulo shows up, taking advantage of people thinking she is in costume, while allowing Debo Zaihodoron to cheat for her. However, once the game begins, Luckyulo soon gets distracted and plays the game for real. Both Daigo and Ian soon win their round fairly quickly, they receive the first and second place prizes, but the Lost Stone has been designated as the third place prize, and the one who possesses the treasure chest that will win it is none other than Mitsuhiko, who taunts Souji and Amy with this very information. Souji wants to challenge Mitsuhiko to a fair fight, but Mitsuhiko reveals he has a legion of bodyguards armed with laser tag guns. Souji easily dispatches the bodyguards with a stick as if he was wielding his sword, and would easily have beaten Mitsuhiko in the same manner, but Debo Zaihodoron attacks, disrupting the plans. Souji and Amy transform and save Mitsuhiko from the monster, and as Souji drives the confused Debo Zaihodoron off, Mitsuhiko, who has had a change of heart about his jealousy and selfishness, calls out to Amy. Elsewhere, Utsusemimaru is ambushed by Dogold, and while he transforms into Kyoryu Gold to hold off his foe, who reveals he has absorbed Endolf just as he once held Utsusemimaru. Kyoryu Black and Kyoryu Red Carnival come to back up Kyoryu Gold, with Kyoryu Red Carnival managing to drive Dogold off, temporarily. The Kyoryugers regroup to take out Debo Zaihodoron, who has just managed to master Debo Doronboss's special ability to suck up any energy attacks into the vault in his chest. Kyoryu Red Carnival becomes Kyoryu Red Macho Carnival to destroy the vault, shutting it permanently, before the Kyoryugers defeat Debo Zaihodoron, who flies off and lands right next to Luckyulo, who has spent the entire time playing the game instead of sneaking inside the manor as planned. When asked if she got the stone, Luckyulo changes the subject by enlarging Debo Zaihodoron who is quickly dispatched by Bakuretsu Kyoryuzin. As the prizes are handed out to the other contestants, Amy reveals that Mitsuhiko gave her the treasure chest to win the Lost Stone to repay Souji for saving him from the monster. He then vows to the Kyoryugers that he will become a better person from now on, and he promises to have a fair rematch with Souji one day.
31	"Vacance! The Eternal Holiday"; Transliteration: "Bākansu! Eien no Horidē" (Japanese: バーカンス！えいえんのホリデー)	September 29, 2013
Nobuharu tells the other Kyoryugers of the Fall Festival he is helping with, but Souji and Amy seem uninterested, and he is put off when Utsusemimaru reveals that he is actually younger than Nobuharu. After spending all night preparing for the festival with Yuko, they wakes up in the morning to an unprecedented heat wave and Rika acting as if it is still summer vacation. Nobuharu goes into town and finds that Souji and Amy are acting in the same way, just as he spots Debo Vacance. Dogold and Canderrilla make their presence known, with Dogold explaining that Debo Vacance will make people happy by making them feel that it is summer vacation, but it will also enrage the people who were unaffected by the monster's spell for having to deal with people affected. Nobuharu tries to get Souji and Amy to enter battle against the group, but the two unable to transform with Kyoryu Blue forced to fight Dogold while they play with Canderrilla and Debo Vacance. Before Dogold can land a finishing blow, Torin spirits the three off to the Spirit Base, where Torin reveals to Nobuharu that the other three have also been hit by Debo Vacance's Holiday Beam. Despite the set backs, Nobuharu continues to prepare for the fall festival, while Yuko gets second thoughts, when he realizes that anyone who was outside the previous day was affected by the Holiday Beam, he realizes that the Debo Vacance he has been fighting is only a copy, with the real giant-sized Debo Vacance in outer space, using the sun's rays to amplify his Holiday Beam. He transforms into Kyoryu Blue to attempt to stop the monster, but only gets attacked by Dogold, Canderrilla, and Luckyulo. The other Kyoryugers soon join him, but they are all still under Debo Vacance's spell, and they go off to play with Debo Vacance. When the monster tries to attack Yuko, who has come along when Rika has run off to join the fun, Kyoryu Blue blocks the attack, defeating the clone, and causing Yuko to realize just who Kyoryu Blue is. She then uses her family's signature super strength to throw a massive barrel into Kyoryu Red's face, berating him for shirking his duties, snapping him out of the monster's grasp just as Kyoryu Blue manages to defeat Dogold, who takes his leave after the fake Debo Vacance is destroyed. Kyoryu Red sorties PlezuOh out into space to attack the real Debo Vacance, sending the monster crashing back to Earth and restoring everyone to normal. Luckyulo shrinks Debo Vacance down to a human size and then tries to escape with him and Canderrilla, but the Kyoryugers stop them in their tracks, with Kyoryu Blue leading the team on a fall-themed joke introduction that he botches. As Kyoryu Green and Kyoryu Pink battle Canderrilla and Luckyulo, Kyoryu Blue and Kyoryu Red Kung-Fu Carnival overwhelm Debo Vacance, defeating the monster who explodes in a display of fireworks. Later that night, Nobuharu is exhausted from the events and has fallen asleep. Yuko covers him up with a blanket, and silently thanks him for saving her earlier that day.
32	"Victory! It's a Sports Match"; Transliteration: "Bikutorī! Supōtsu Shōbu da" (Japanese: ビクトリー！スポーツしょうぶだ)	October 6, 2013
Yayoi presents the Kyoryugers two new Zyudenchi: Victory (V) (powered through the teamwork of the core 5 Kyoryugers) and Maximum (X) (powered through the core 5 Kyoryugers combining their powers with a minimum of Kyoryu Gold and at least one other extra Kyoryuger up to 5 extras, meaning two teams of 5 Kyoryugers each - 5 core Kyoryugers and 5 extra Kyoryugers - 10 Kyoryugers means that both the Victory and Maximum Zyudenchi are at the fullest extent of their combined powers) - before she explains what these new special Zyudenchi can do, the Kyoryugers are alerted to an attack by Dogold and Aigallon at a competition. Intercepting them, the Kyoryugers are confronted by Dogold's Debo Monster Debo Spokorn and his specially trained Zorima. Outmatched by the Zorimas' basketball-themed method attack, unable to use the power of the Victory Zyudenchi, the Kyoryugers use the Futabain Zyudenchi to get the basketball. When Debo Spokorn insists that act to be unfair sportsmanship, Kyoryu Red decides that they would settle with a game of basketball tomorrow. When asked why that just could finish the bad guys off while the chance, Kyoryu Red explains that maybe training will help them learn how to use the Victory Zyudenchi. With Utsusemimaru serving as their manager, despite a rough start, the Kyoryugers eventually learn their strengths as a basketball team. Back at the Spirit Base, realizing Aigallon benefits from many participants depressed over the competition cancelled, Yayoi feels something is still off about Dogold's involvement. By the next day, having changed the game format to soccer at the last minute, Debo Spokorn reveals himself to be a distraction to hold the Kyoryugers at bay long enough for Dogold to obtain the Lost Stone of Futabain within a trophy. Despite the turn of events, with Utsusemimaru held at bay by the Cambrima, the Kyoryugers use their basketball skills to beat Debo Spokorn's team while Torin holds Dogold off so Kyoryu Violet can get the trophy and people to safety. With Kyoryu Violet soon joining them later straight after the saving as they take their fight outside, Kyoryu Red Carnival uses the Victory Zyudenchi so the core 5 Kyoryugers can defeat Debo Spokorn with their Five-Zyudenryu Victory Finish. Forced by a livid Dogold, Luckyulo enlarges both Debo Spokorn and his team with PteraidenOh Western taking out the Zorima and PlezuOh Ankydon wiping out the Cambrima. After being weakened by the special Kyoryuzin Baseball formation, Debo Spokorn is destroyed by Bakurestsu Kyoryuzin. Later, as they have obtained Futabain's Lost Stone, Utsusemimaru feels a bit left out of not getting to play basketball.
33	"Maximum! I Will Protect the Lady"; Transliteration: "Makishimamu! Redi wa Ore ga Mamoru" (Japanese: マキシマム！レディはおれがまもる)	October 13, 2013
While training, Utsusemimaru is visited by two girls who spent a night with Ian and ask the shy samurai to give him his sunglasses. At the Spirit Base, revealing it to be an indirect prank, Ian is warned not to harass Utsusemimaru if they are to use the Maximum Zyudenchi. However, upon learning that his European fling Erica Stonefield is coming to Japan, Ian finds himself hounded by Utsusemimaru who intends to punish him for his playboy lifestyle. Though Daigo tries to convince him that Ian is a nice guy, Utsusemimaru is unconvinced when Ian runs off with Erica. With Utsusemimaru in pursuit, the other Kyoryugers find themselves facing Debo Akidamonne, who Luckyulo has employed alongside Aigallon to do his dirty work. When Aigallon takes over so his Debo Monster can go after Erica, Kyoryu Red becomes Kyoryu Red Carnival to hold off the general as he attempts to control himself before he and Luckyulo are blasted off. Elsewhere, as Erica attempts to calm him down, Utsusemimaru is sucked into Debo Akidamonne's Autumn Zone alongside the young woman, as Ian is knocked out. Within the Autumn Zone, Utsusemimaru learns from Erica that Ian only hangs out with sad girls to cheer them up while revealing that she came to Japan to give him a Lost Stone. Debo Akidamonne confirms this as he intends to take it while fighting Utsusemimaru. However, having given Erica one of his Parasagun Zyudenchi to serve as a beacon, Ian arrives under the flowers he bought and had his fellow Kyoryugers shower the area with them. Seeing that he is a gentleman, Utsusemimaru and Ian transform as Kyoryu Red Carnival and Kyoryu Violet join the team to defeat Debo Akidamonne with the Victory and Maximum Zyudenchi - 7-Zyudenryu Victory Maximum Finish. After returning to their dimension, the Kyoryugers find themselves facing an enlarged Debo Akidamonne. PteraidenOh Parasagun is formed to finish the Debo Monster off. Later, after Erica gives the Kyoryugers Kentrospiker's Lost Stone, Utsusemimaru comes to understand Ian better before finding himself hounded by Ian's girlfriends.
34	"Revival! Bragigas Appears"; Transliteration: "Fukkatsu! Buragigasu Shutsugen" (Japanese: ふっかつ！ブラギガスしゅつげん)	October 20, 2013
At the Spirit Base, Kyoryu Cyan and Gray reveal that they found the last of the Lost Stones where Bragigas is resting. However, Kyoryu Gray explains that Bragigas' resting place is in hell as Torin reveals how during the battle with Deboth creating the Land Majin Gadoma who killed the Guardians. Bragigas cries at his comrades' death then his tears turned the Guardians into fragment forms as the Lost Stones, the enraged Bragigas forced to use its Gigant Cannon to defeat Deboth before it was dragged underground by the dying Gadoma. As the Kyoryugers know feeding the final Lost Stone should be their concern, Torin senses the Deboth Army at its location: Lake Madō. Once there, the Kyoryugers find Debo Tairyon fishing up items and perceive that he is after the Lost Stone. However, the others find themselves dealing with Aigallon and Canderilla while Kyoryu Red is kept from attacking Debo Tairyon by Dogold before Dantetsu arrives. Once getting his son to safety on the other side of the lake, Dantetsu reveals that Bragigas is Torin's partner and that the reason he left Daigo a decade ago was that he heard Guardians' melody before he fishes up Deinosgrander's Lost Stone. Daigo yanks the stone out of the lake as the other Kyoryugers take out the grunts. With the Lost Stones all gathered, the entire lake bed is destroyed with Bragigas revealed as the Guardians revive him while the Kyoryugers fight Debo Tairyon after he finished fishing for his true objective and giving it to Luckyulo. After being defeated by the 8-Zyudenryu Victory Maximum Finish, Debo Tairyon has Luckyulo enlarge him as Bragigas finally awakens. Finding themselves in the Spirit Base which is now the cockpit of Bragigas, the Kyoryugers are given the matching Zyudenchi to use with the Guardians' Zyudenchi to have Bragigas assume Battle Mode. Using the Guardians' abilities to take out the Cambrima, Bragigas transforms into Gigant BragiOh to destroy Debo Tairyon. Finding themselves outside, the Kyoryugers watch Bragigas walk off.
35	"Super Awesome! Gigant Kyoryuzin"; Transliteration: "Chō Sugee!! Giganto Kyōryūjin" (Japanese: チョーすげえッ！ギガントキョウリュウジン)	October 27, 2013
Finding themselves unable to enter the Spirit Base, with Kyoryu Cyan and Gray searching for Torin and Bragigas, the Kyoryugers are worried with Daigo assuring them before Yayoi arrives with a silver Gaburivolver that enables them to enter the Spirit Base and upgrade the Kyoryugers' gear. Revealing the Spirit Base was originally part of and has been integrated into Bragigas, Torin is given the silver Gaburivolver so he can enter and leave the Spirit Base without trouble. However, Torin senses something amiss as the Zyudenchi in the Charge Box are consumed in dark energies with all the Kyoryugers but Yayoi ejected from Bragigas. The Kyoryugers then encounter Dogold and Kaos, the latter revealing the item he had Debo Tairyon fish up from Lake Madō was a core fragment of Gadoma. Furthermore, fragments of Gadoma have entered Bragigas' body, stunning it while disrupting the Zyudenchi. As the Kyoryugers find themselves being overwhelmed by Dogold, Kaos revives Gadoma to destroy the city before entering the Spirit Base through the curse. As Kaos provokes Torin with his incompatibility with Bragigas to mortally wound him, Bakuretsu Kyoryuzin is defeated by Gadoma as the rest of the Zyudenryu arrive. Coming to, Daigo and Nobuharu are cared for by Yuko and Rika while Amy and Ian are tended to by Gentle, Souji and Utsusemimaru find Yuuji and Tsuyoshi. With their second wind, the Kyoryugers form Kyoryuzin and Pteraidenoh Western to battle Gadoma with the support of friends, family, and those they have helped. This enables the Kyoryugers to restore their melody to Kaos's shock, freeing Bragigas from Gadoma's curse as Torin finds out the silver Gaburivolver saved him from Kaos's attack. Stating things are different from before as he hears everyone's cheers, Torin has Bragigas rise to the surface to aid the Kyoryugers as Gigant BragiOh. With the cheering still continuing, the main Kyoryugers combine all of the core 5 Zyudenryu with Gigant BragiOh to form Gigant Kyoryuzin and completely destroy Gadoma. However, Gadoma sends out a lightning bolt that opens a portal to the underworld. But as they are about to plug up the hole, the Kyoryugers and Torin are attacked by another Torin who reveals he that defeated Kyoryu Cyan and Kyoryu Gray.
36	"Giga Gaburincho! The Silver Miracle"; Transliteration: "Giga Gaburincho! Kiseki no Shirubā" (Japanese: ギガガブリンチョ！きせきのシルバー)	November 10, 2013
Facing his lookalike, Torin learns the being is Kaos's new younger brother Mad Torin as the Kyoryugers manage to escape. Once back at the Spirit Base, the Kyoryugers learn that Gadoma's final action opened a portal to Deboth Hell where members of the Deboth Army who the Kyoryugers killed have ended up. With Kyoryu Gray and Cyan unable to help them until they replenish themselves, leaving the living Kyoryugers on their own. By that time, the ghosts of Debo Monsters begin absorbing things to restore their physical forms which powers Mad Torin's sword. Despite the Kyoryugers' attempts, they are forced to retreat when Torin is wounded in an attempt to hold Mad Torin off. Taken back to the Spirit Base by Daigo and Ian, Torin learns that the Gigant Cannon is the only way to seal the portal. Torin reveals that it is impossible, but Daigo and the others assure him that he is a hero and can become the Flashing Brave. Continuing to feel bad for before learning that Rika has been kidnapped, Torin goes upon Yayoi's insistence to believe in himself while revealing she found a way for the Gigant Cannon to be used. While others deal with Debo Peshango, Kyoryu Red Kung-Fu Carnival battles Mad Torin before being ambushed by the Zetsumates as Torin arrives with the intent to fight with everything he had. Realizing that he became an embodiment of Brave, Torin awakens the Giga Gaburivolver and becomes Bragigas's true partner: Kyoryu Silver. While the others defeat the Debo Monsters, Kyoryu Silver defeats Mad Torin with the Trinity Straizer. Shocked upon seeing this turn of events, Kaos sees Luckyulo already enlarging Mad Torin. With Yayoi contacting them, Gigant Kyoryuzin is formed to fight Mad Torin before entering Gigant Formation to destroy him while restoring Lake Madō to seal the portal. Later, as Torin feels a weight lifted from his shoulders, the Kyoryugers begin hunting down the remaining Debo Monsters.
37	"Revenge! The Ghost Deboth Army"; Transliteration: "Ribenji! Yūrei Dēbosu Gun" (Japanese: リベンジ！ゆうれいデーボスぐん)	November 17, 2013
While he and the others are still looking down the remaining revived Debo Monsters, Souji has been astonished with Torin's swordsmanship and wants to emulate it. However, Torin advises Souji against it as it was made to work with his Deboth cell-based body and could harm the hand. The next day, Souji and Utsusemimaru make their way to find their Kyoryuger team mates acting strangely. It turned out that Debo Kibishidesu and Debo Spokorn have formed a Deboth Academy Private School and educated Debo Akkumuun in using his new ability to switch the Kyoryugers' minds and bodies. Though they fall for Debo Akkumuun's attack, Kyoryu Green and Kyoryu Gold are able to capitalize due their status as swordsmen. As the other Kyoryugers have trouble coping with their switched bodies, Souji and Utsusemimaru train before receiving a challenge from the Deboth Academy Private School. Unfortunately, with Debo Kibishidesu and Debo Spokorn using a Zorima posing as their student, the Kyoryugers fall for a trap as Debo Akkumuun switch Kyoryu Green and Kyoryu Gold with their teammates before the fight begins. In response, the Kyoryugers exchange their weapons as Torin arrives and transforms into Kyoryu Silver before Debo Kibishidesu has Debo Akkumuun switch them to benefit from the Kyoryuger's power. Luckily, having trained despite Torin's warning, Souji uses his own version of the Trinity Straizer to defeat Debo Kibishidesu before everyone is restored to their bodies once the Osakimakkurar pillow is destroyed and the Kyoryugers defeat the Debo Monsters. Luckyulo, having watched the events while not intending to get involved, is forced into enlarging the monsters by Dogold. But the enlarged Debo Monsters are quickly destroyed by Gigant Kyoryuzin. Later, while reprimanding Souji for taking a huge risk, Torin offers to teach the human his fighting style.
38	"Love Touch! The Too Beautiful Zorima"; Transliteration: "Rabu Tatchi! Utsukushisugiru Zōrima" (Japanese: らぶタッチ！うつくしすぎるゾーリま)	November 24, 2013
While recuperating since his defeat by Mad Torin and pondering if he should pass his title on, Tessai finds Daigo who is tailing Amy who is meeting with a guy. This person, Shinya Tsukouchi, turns out to be a descendant of Tessai's with the Spirit seeing him to be a worthy heir until learning Shinya is also Yuu Aoyagi, the author of the Love Touch manga Amy reads. While Tessai is furious to learn that Shinya is asking Amy to help him out by posing as his alias to meet a diehard fan, Torin senses a Deboth Army attack and the male Kyoryugers find Canderrilla and Aigallon with a Zorima stealing the beauty from women. Revealed to be an upgraded Zorima, he uses the women's beauty to transform into Beautiful Zoreamer and upgrades three Zorima with the powers of Kyoryu Blue, Kyoryu Green, and Kyoryu Gold. Kyoryu Red and Kyoryu Black chase after Beautiful Zoreamer while the other Kyroyugers defeat the Zorima to regain their full strength. Elsewhere, Amy visits the diehard Love Touch fan who turns out to be Luckyulo herself. Despite the tension, Amy gives Luckyulo the autograph she asked for before giving her something to think about by mentioning Yuu Aoyagi is part of the world the Deboth Army is trying to destroy. As the events unfold, Shinya gets a surprise visit from Tessai who insists him to meet his fan. But along the way, Shinya runs afoul of Beautiful Zoreamer and saves a girl the empowered Zorima was attacking as Kyoryu Red, Kyoryu Pink, and Kyoryu Black arrive. Touched by Shinya's story that he makes shojo manga to see girls happy, Tessai deems his descendant a worthy fighter and regains his ability to become Kyoryu Gray. Finding his attacks ineffective against Kyoryu Gray as reinforcements arrive, Beautiful Zoreamer assumes his full make-up form to battle Kyoryu Red Samba Carnival before being defeated by him, Kyoryu Pink, and Kyoryu Black. Finding only Luckyulo's Sukusuku Joylo, Aigallon enlarges Beautiful Zoreamer with Giant Zorima and Cambrima supporting him as Gigant BragiOh and PteraidenOh Dricera are formed to finish off the monsters. Later, with Tessai watching, Shinya thanks Amy for her help while Luckyulo is writing another fan letter.
39	"Full Force! The Ten Kyoryugers' Power"; Transliteration: "Seizoroi! Jū-dai Kyōryū Pawā" (Japanese: せいぞろい！10だいキョウリュウパワー)	December 1, 2013
Daigo tells the others that Mikoto "Meeko" Amano is coming back to Japan as Yayoi is told of the events of her last visit and feels threatened by her closeness to Daigo. With Amy as her clueless helper, Yayoi spies on Daigo meeting up with Meeko before realizing the girl is armed with a weapon: Deathryuger's Flute Buster. Confused by Meeko's sudden attempt on their lives, a figure emerges that Daigo recognizes as the Ferocious Knight D. Upon revealing he escaped from Deboth Hell, D explains that he went to convert Meeko into his minion and has gained new power, no longer needing the Deathryuger's Zyudenchi. With Meeko playing the Flute Buster, D overpowers Kyoryu Red, Kyoryu Pink, and Kyoryu Violet until the other Kyoryugers arrive. While the others deal with D, Kyoryu Red tries to reach through to Mikoto using the "Dino Soul" song before his transformation is cancelled as Amy gets herself gravely wounded to save him from D's attack. Before D can land a finishing blow, Bragigas arrives to save them. While Yayoi tends to Amy's wounds, Daigo leads the men on an assault on the broadcast station where D intends to have Meeko sing to raise an army of the dead. However, D intercepts them and overpowers them as Daigo explains that Meeko is still fighting his spell. By then, Amy and Yayoi arrive with an idea to save Meeko with the combined melody of all ten Kyoryugers. Though D explains that he sicced a thousand Zorima on Torin and Tessai while they were checking up on Ramirez, he learns that the three extra Kyoryugers have easily defeated the grunts. Assembled, the ten Kyoryugers' harmony restores Meeko to normal before they transform to fight D's gathered army while Kyoryu Red Carnival deals with D. After being given the Tobaspino Zyudenchi, Kyoryu Red uses it with the Stegotchi Zyudenchi to weaken D as Kyoryu Red Samba Carnival Special before the Kyoryugers defeat him with the Ten Zyudenryu Victory Maximum Brave Finish. Furious, D douses himself in Restoration Water with the intent to destroy the planet. However, Meeko's singing summons Tobaspino, and the Kyoryugers use him to form SpinoDaiOh, finally destroying D once and for all. Later, much to Daigo's dismay, Meeko is invited to shop with Yayoi and Amy as part of the former's plan to get her away from Daigo.
40	"Wowie! Pops Is Broken-Hearted"; Transliteration: "Gutto Kūru! Ossan wa Tsurai yo" (Japanese: グッとくーる！オッサンはつらいよ)	December 8, 2013
The Kyoryugers learn that Nobuharu is attending a marriage meeting orchestrated by Yuko. On the way, the siblings find Ramirez as he has overdone things once he regained his Brave. They leave him with Souji and Utsusemimaru as Yuko confides to them that she knows her brother's activities as a Kyoryuger. Soon after, Nobuharu meets up with his potential future wife Kimiko Momozono, who is actually Canderrilla in disguise. Given some time alone, Nobuharu tries to figure out Canderrilla's game while learning that she has always had a thing for him, as she did not have the urge to continue with the scheme to take his heart. The other Kyoryugers arrive, exposing Canderrilla's monster Debo Kantokku who is acting in a Deboth Army scheme to target men in love. Revealing he has the power to send people into movies they have watched, Kantokku places the Kyoryugers in the Kyoryu Detectives, based on movies Amy has been watching. Taking a stray shot meant for Canderrilla, Nobuharu asks her to him again as Debo Kantokku and Luckyulo spirit her way. Though the others think he is under a spell, Nobuharu intends to talk Canderrilla into releasing the men her monster has taken captive. Daigo gives him his blessing while Souji and Utsusemimaru tell Yuko of Canderrilla. Upon finding Canderrilla, Nobuharu protects her from Yuko and convinces his sister that she is not evil. Nobuharu pleads with Canderrilla her to free the men she captured, and when she asks why, Nobuharu explains that he believes that there is some good in her. However, Debo Kantokku attacks them. While Ramirez gets Yuko to safety, Nobuharu holds the Debo Monster off. Upon watching Nobuharu getting beaten to a pulp, Canderrilla feels powerless before he tells her that she and Luckyulo are created to study human happiness so they can like humans. Touched by his words, shocking Luckyulo, Canderrilla kicks Nobuharu's Gaburivolver to him, claiming it to be an accident, and reveals that the captured men are in the film on Debo Kantokku's chest. With this knowledge, Kyoryu Blue frees the men as the other Kyoryugers arrive. Though he places them in the Kyoryu Academy movie, the Kyoryugers escape it and defeat Debo Kantokku. When enlarged, Debo Kantokku proceeds to start up a giant monster movie with Giant Zorima based on Torin's watching Amy's DVDs until Gigant Kyoryuzin destroys the monsters. Later, Nobuharu receives a surprise party at the Spirit Base, and Torin wonders if Canderrilla can truly be redeemed. However, back at the Frozen Castle, Canderrilla and Luckyulo find that Kaos has returned.
41	"Yanasanta! The Deboth World War"; Transliteration: "Yanasanta! Dēbosu Sekai Kessen" (Japanese: ヤナサンタ！デーボスせかいけっせん)	December 15, 2013
On Christmas Eve, Daigo helps Nobuharu and an excited Utsusemimaru with decorating a shopping center. He later meets up with Souji as he trains with Torin, who tells them that Earth has a melody of its own while noticing a light shining from the land near by. Before Torin can explain about the land's light, the Kyoryugers see Deboth appearing and are barely able to destroy him with Bakuretsu Kyoryuzin this time around. The Kyoryugers later learn that the Deboth they fought is actually a clone created by lame toys that respond to angry children. At the Frozen Castle, after showing concern for Kaos's health, Dogold tells Kaos that he and his creation Debo Yanasanta will begin the next phase of their plan. As Christmas Eve begins in Japan, more Clone Deboth appear in Tokyo, Beijing, London, New York, and Hawaii. The Kyoryugers sortie out: Kyoryu Red takes SpinoDaiOh to Tokyo; Kyoryu Gold, Kyoryu Black, and Kyoryu Green head to London in PteraidenOh Western; Kyoryu Blue and Kyoryu Pink head to New York in Kyoryuzin; Kyoryu Violet, assisted by Kyoryu Cyan and Kyoryu Gray, takes PlezuOh to Hawaii; and Kyoryu Silver heads on his own in Gigant BragiOh to Beijing. Once SpinoDaiOh destroys the Clone Deboth attacking Tokyo, Kyoryu Red sees Debo Yanasanta and chases after him. Debo Yanasanta admits that he stole letters from Santa Claus and reveals that he is one of five other Debo Yanasanta as he and his brother, the Debo Yanasanta from London combine to overpower Kyoryu Red. In London, while Kyoryu Green and Kyoryu Black continue to pilot PteraidenOh Western, Kyoryu Gold sees Dogold absorbing some the emotional energy from the Clone Deboth, who reveals the attack to be a divide and conquer scheme to get Kyoryu Red on his own. Noticing something off with Dogold, Utsusemimaru follows after him and fakes his rage to free Daigo while telling his nemesis that he is no longer himself. Once they transform, Kyoryu Red and Kyoryu Gold exchange their personal Zyudenchi to defeat Yanasanta ×12. With Daigo barely able to stand, Dogold attempts to kill him when Dantetsu intervenes as he and the Kyoryugers get to safety. After recognizing Dantetsu, Dogold decides to take over the human's body and tells Luckyulo to summon the other Debo Yanasantas back to Japan.
42	"Wonderful! Christmas of Justice"; Transliteration: "Wandahō! Seigi no Kurisumasu" (Japanese: ワンダホー！せいぎのクリスマス)	December 22, 2013
As the other Kyoryugers deal with the Clone Deboth with aid from Ankydon, Bunpachy, and Tobaspino, Utsusemimaru tends to Daigo's wounds with Dantetsu. However, the three are ambushed by the surviving Debo Yanasanta brothers as they merge into Debo Yanasanta ×345 while going after Dantetsu. Covering Daigo and Dantetsu's escape, Utsusemimaru finds his Gaburi Changer frozen by Yanasanta just as Dogold arrives, sending Aigallon to support Debo Yanasanta before the other Kyoryugers arrive to save the others. Elsewhere, Dogold finds himself unable to possess Dantetsu. Torin arrives and reveals that Dantetsu was bathed in the light of the land and became able to hear the planet's melody as King of Humanity. After transforming into Kyoryu Red Carnival, Daigo battles Dogold while Dantetsu tells Torin that he is able to enact the final part of his mission. With Debo Yanasanta knocked into him, Dogold sees the ten Kyoryugers assembled as his Debo Monster suddenly puts him in the way of the Ten Zyudenryu Maximum Victory Finish. With the other knight arriving, Dogold's body explodes, with Endolf emerging from within him, picking up Dogold's face mask and telling him that he manipulated Dogold's plan from the start. He attempts to crush him before Canderrilla and Aigallon convince him to let their ally go. Though Debo Yanasanta is enlarged, he is destroyed by Gigant Kyoryuzin, PteraidenOh Ankydon, and PlezuOh Bunpachy using the All Gigant Full Breaster. At the Frozen Castle, Kaos reveals that he knew of Dogold's treachery as the deposed Raging Knight takes over a Cambrima while venting his rage over lacking a body. At the Spirit Base, the Kyoryugers are upset that they have not managed to fix the Deboth Army's plans, when Daigo gets an idea. He and the other Kyoryugers don Christmas attire to give presents to the children all over the world, as Dantetsu watches from afar.
43	"The Blade of the Soul! Roar, Straizer"; Transliteration: "Tamashii no Tsurugi! Unare Sutoreizā" (Japanese: たましいのつるぎ！うなれストレイザー)	January 5, 2014
While Daigo is pumped up over his father Dantetsu travelling to enact his role in the Deboth Army's defeat, Souji, already surprised that his father is allowing him to learn from another teacher, learns he is lacking something of a mental nature to fully use Torin's fighting style. Later, at the Tiger Boy, the Kyoryugers encounter men working for the famous fashion model Reiko Tanba, who reveals herself to be Souji's mother. She has come to take him away from being a Kyoryuger and become a fashion model. Although the other Kyoryugers try to talk her out of taking Souji, Reiko will only stop if she meets with the Kyoryugers' mentor. After the others tell Torin of the crisis, with Utsusemimaru trying but failing to stop Genryu from interfering, Torin senses a Deboth Army attack and sends the Kyoryugers to intercept. When they leave, he asks Utsusemimaru for the Maximum Zyudenchi. The Kyoryugers find Endolf, who forces Dogold to fight for him. As others deal with the Zorima, with Aigallon and Luckyulo watching from a safe distance, Kyoryu Gold fights an extremely furious Dogold before he acknowledges that he is a mere parasite. At the Tanba building, Genryu finds Reiko just as Souji attempts to have his parents talk peacefully with each other, while realizing that he stayed by his father's side after the divorce. As Souji crumbles from his parents' bickering, a man known as Torii, Torin having taken a human disguise with the Maximum Zyudenchi and Tessai's illusion powers. After "Torii" scolds Souji for his actions towards his parents, he convinces them to stop fighting and allow Souji to choose his own path in life. Before they can say anything, a black-cloaked figure appears and attempts to kidnap them, only managing to grab Genryu since he has the most sorrow compared to his ex-wife. After hearing this, Souji remembers that he stayed by his father's side when was emotionally distraught from Reiko leaving him. With that thought in mind, Souji uses his version of the Trinity Straizer to save his father, but the cloaked figure escapes. With his parents' blessing, Souji runs off to join his team and single-handedly defeats the Zorima and Cambrima just as Kyoryu Silver arrives. Dogold shields Endolf from their finishing attack, and is then enlarged, with the Kyoryugers forming Raiden Kyoryuzin to fight him. Just before they land the final blow, he allows his Cambrima host to be destroyed and he escapes. Back at the Frozen Castle, Aigallon and Luckyulo question Dogold over his recent change in demeanor, but he only responds by saying that all of their roles will change. They are suddenly joined by the black-cloaked figure, as well as a white-cloaked figure with a trumpet. Later, Souji receives his mother's blessing to remain a Kyoryuger as all she wants is to start fresh with Genryu, and they thank "Torii" for helping them come to terms.
44	"Kaos Laughs! Destruction's Countdown"; Transliteration: "Warau Kaosu! Hametsu no Kauntodaun" (Japanese: わらうカオス！はめつのカウントダウン)	January 12, 2014
Kaos reveals that the two cloaked figures were created to fulfill the quota of joy and sadness, just before he experiences a violent mood swing which shocks Aigallon, Canderrilla, and Luckyulo, who are also upset that two new knights have been called into finish their job. Souji tells the others of the black-cloaked figure he met, so the Kyoryugers start searching for him. Daigo is stopped when he hears the trumpet of a white-cloaked figure who is capturing composers. Kyoryu Red Carnival attempts to save them, but he is ambushed by the black-cloaked figure who use their combined attacks to defeat him. The two figures take their leave as the other Kyoryugers arrive, only to find themselves attacked by Dogold. Kyoryu Black, Green, and Blue attempt to hold off Dogold until Kyoryu Gold arrives, allowing Kyoryu Pink and Red to escape. In Bragigas, Amy tends to Daigo's wounds and they tell Torin about what has happened. He believes that Earth's original melody, which Dantetsu has been sent to find, may be the only means to counter the new threat. Once Minityra arrives to tell them about the melody, Kyoryu Red and Kyoryu Pink follow it to a gramophone in which the cloaked figures have placed the captive humans in to record their emotions. Joined by the others, the Kyoryugers' summon Kentrospiker to destroy the gramophone, but the attack is blocked by the black-cloaked figure. Though Kyoryu Silver manages to free the captive humans by smashing the gramophone, he realizes that the record has been taken by Kaos, just as he absorbs it. It is revealed that Kaos has used his body as a vessel for the quota of emotions and he offers himself to the fully revived Deboth who summons his Frozen Castle body, intending to merge back into it to complete his evolution. Though the Kyoryugers attempt to fight him and the robed figures, Deboth proves too powerful for the Kyoryugers. Just as with things look hopeless, Kyoryu Gold arrives, allowing the seven Kyoryugers to use their melody to counter Deboth's melody. After enduring a combination attack of the Zandar Thunder, Trinity Straizer, and Five Zyuden Victory Finish, Deboth enlarges and overpowers Gigant Kyoryuzin with the assistance of Endolf and the cloaked figures. Yayoi informs the others that Plezuon is injured, meaning the only option left for the Kyoryugers is to storm the Frozen Palace for a final battle. At the Frozen Castle, Deboth proceeds to transfer his soul back into it and begins evolving while setting up a 50-hour countdown with the Darkness Clock. Now restored, Kaos relieves Luckyulo of his duties to Deboth just as Endolf presents their trump card.
45	"That Can't Be Dad! The End of Silver"; Transliteration: "Uso Daro Oyaji! Shirubā no Saigo" (Japanese: うそだろオヤジ！シルバーのさいご)	January 19, 2014
Unable to wait for Dantetsu, the Kyoryugers arrive at the Frozen Castle before they transform to face Kaos, Endolf, and the new knights. Torin entrusts Souji with the Feather Edge. The Frozen Castle suddenly transforms into Deboth, with Kyoryu Silver and Gigant BragiOh ready to fight the monster as he begins evolving. Though it seems that Gigant BragiOh has defeated Deboth, it turns out that the monster only assumed the form to eject a fragment containing Deboth's mind to complete his evolution into fully evolved human-like Transcendenterfly God form. Proving himself to be much faster and more powerful than his last state, the Kyoryugers are defeated by Deboth who then enlarges to defeat Gigant BragiOh. Though he has the power to do so, Deboth refrains from killing Torin at the last second as the traitor needs to die as a rogue Deboth Army member so he could not continue to interfere as a Spirit Ranger. To that end, Deboth reveals the task of Torin's execution will be done by a new ally: Dantetsu. Dantetsu uses his pipe to weaken Torin as Endolf and Kaos reveal that they have made a pact with the human so that he can kill Torin for them in return for the planet being spared. Though Daigo refuses to accept this as the truth, he is forced to watch Torin be killed by his father's hand. Dantetsu explains that he has heard the Earth's true melody and is acting on it, but Daigo refuses to accept his father's new ideals. After taking the Giga Gaburivolver, Dantetsu transforms into Kyoryu Silver and overpowers Kyoryu Red before defeating the Kyoryugers. As Deboth takes his leave, the Zyudenryu arrive to battle the enlarged Endolf and the new knights. As the others cope with the turn of events, Deboth honors his promise to Dantetsu while Kaos tells the cloaked figures from before that although Luckyulo can be ignored, Canderrilla must be destroyed as she could become a threat if she follows the path Torin did. Aigallon overhears this and is formally introduced his and Canderrilla's replacements, New Sorrowful Knight Icelond and New Joyful Knight Killborero, as he flees for his life. Later that night, Daigo hears the Earth's melody and remembers that he was exposed to it as a baby. He resolves to find out the truth of his father's actions.
46	"The Great Duel! The Strike of Love and Tears"; Transliteration: "Daikettō! Ai to Namida no Ichigeki" (Japanese: だいけっとう！アイとなみだのいちげき)	January 26, 2014
After being picked up by Bragigas, though his friends are against it, Daigo explains his intent to confront Dantetsu as the melody is not sinister and that his father is hiding something. Though he understands, Ian admits he can't accept it emotionally as Daigo tells them that this a fight he must do alone. Promising Amy that he would eat the strawberry parfait with her when it is over, the two talking about how they and the others became friends, Daigo confronts Dantetsu as they assume their Kyoryuger forms to fight. Using their fists, Kyoryu Red understands the Earth's melody before they are attacked by the Deboth Army with Deboth revealing that he went back on his word as gateways for the Debo Monsters to remerge. By then time, after finding a message from Torin imprinted in his sword, the other Kyoryugers race to Daigo's side. However, they find Aigallon, Canderrilla, and Luckyulo being attacked by Icelond. With Ian disgusted by his pleas, Aigallon begs the Kyoryugers to protect Canderrilla and Luckyulo while learning that he has been dead for a long time but his armor is too durable for his soul to find peace. After taking a blow meant for Canderrilla, the other Kyoryugers battling Icelond for the heartless act, Aigallon finds Kyoryu Black using the Deinosgrander to crack his armor so that he finally rest in place. From there, Kyoryu Black joins the fight against Icelond and manages to endure most of their attacks before Kyoryu Black uses Aigallon's Tohohawk to destroy the Deboth Knight. Seeing Canderrilla and Luckyulo crying over Aigallon's death, Ian tells them to go into hiding before he and the others meet up with Daigo and Dantetsu as Mad Torin arrives. However, to Kaos's shock, a dying Mad Torin reveals that Torin is fighting the Debo Monsters confined in Deboth Hell. Daigo reveals that this was all part of Dantetsu and Torin's plan to stop the Deboth Army for good as the Kyoryugers now have five hours to finish this fight for good.
47	"The Great Counterattack! The Greatest Final Brave"; Transliteration: "Daihangeki! Saidai Saigo no Bureibu" (Japanese: だいはんげき！さいだいさいごのブレイブ)	February 2, 2014
With only five hours left until the end of the world, the Kyoryugers transform as Endolf summons a horde of Zorima. Kaos and Endolf are about wipe out the Kyoryugers along with Dogold and Killborero when Tessai and Ramirez arrive and use a barrier to block. The two reveal that Torin is going to destroy the core of Deboth Hell and that they are going to help him. As Killborero enlarges to disrupt the barrier, the Spirit Rangers reveal their replacements who will carry their mantles in their stead: Yuko and Shinya with the former revealing to Nobuharu that she knew of her brother's actions as a Kyoryuger. With Doctor Woorushade leading the Zyudenryu to hold off Killborero, Yayoi arrives to upgrade the Victory and Maximum Zyudenchi with the Earth's Melody. Yuko, Shinya, Yayoi, and Dantetsu assume their Kyoryuger forms to hold Kaos and the Zorima at bay while the main Kyoryugers and Minityra make their way to the Frozen Castle. As Ramirez and Tessai meet up with Torin in Deboth Hell, the main Kyoryugers find their transformation canceled by Deboth as Endolf and Dogold. Telling the others to leave, Utsusemimaru holds off the two Deboth Knights. But during the fight, tricking Endolf into letting his guard down, Dogold suddenly attacks to break the Resentful Knight's hold on him. Telling Utsusemimaru to help him, Dogold forms himself over the samurai to combine their Lightning Afterglow attacks to destroy Endolf. Once back to possessing his Cambrima, his armor heavily damaged, the dying Dogold tells Utsusemimaru to fight him so they can settle things here and now. Accepting his request, Utsusemimaru defeats Dogold but is mortally wounded in the process as he collapses. With Nobuharu holding off a horde of Zorima, and then Ian and Souji dealing with the fortress's last line of defense, Daigo and Amy use the Deinochasers to enter the Frozen Castle where another legion of Zorima waiting for them.
48 (Final)	"The Big Explosion! Goodbye Kyoryugers"; Transliteration: "Daibakuhatsu! Sayonara Kyōryūjā" (Japanese: だいばくはつ！さよならキョウリュウジャー)	February 9, 2014
With their friends doing their best to hold off the Deboth Army on all fronts, and Killborero seemingly destroyed by PlezuOh, Daigo and Amy are attacked by Deboth who tells them the extinction will begin in ten minutes. When Amy is targeted by Deboth when she tries to get the Victory and Maximum Zyudenchi, Daigo takes a hit meant for her as they fall. Back outside, having played into Kaos's hands by killing him, Dantetsu returns to the Spirit Base where he meets up with Ian, Nobuharu, and Souji as they bring Utsusemimaru's unconscious body with them. Suddenly, the Frozen Castle rises as Killborero enters the Spirit Base and reveals the fortress is going into space to unleash a melody that can obliterate the planet. Refusing to let the Deboth Knight destroy the Spirit Base, regaining their ability to transform, Ian, Nobuharu, and Souji destroy Killborero while Dantetsu tells Yayoi to pursue the Frozen Castle. When she and Daigo see Plezuon, Amy finds herself thrown out to the Zyudenryu by Daigo before it is forced to return to Earth. As the others assure Amy that he is protecting her and will return, Daigo confronts Deboth and learns that his actions are the will of his creator to become the ultimate life form as the countdown reaches zero. However, Daigo hears his friends singing, which overpowers Deboth's doomsday melody as he transforms into Kyoryu Red Carnival. In Deboth Hell, Torin, Ramirez, and Tessai find the pillar maintaining Deboth Hell protected by Kaos, but soon he is affected by the Kyoryugers' melody. Enraged, he fires at the spirits, but much to his surprise, Canderrilla suddenly arrives to block it, followed by Luckyulo who reveals to possess the lantern that allowed them to enter Deboth Hell without dying. Canderrilla tells the spirits to combine their powers with her to repay the Kyoryugers for their kindness. They do, knocking Kaos into the pillar, and as he screams out in agony that Canderrilla was as dangerous as he thought, the pillar explodes, destroying Kaos along with it. Torin tells Canderrilla and Luckyulo to live bravely as he would and the Spirit Rangers fade away as the two of them are flung out of hell. As the Zorima disappear around the world, Yuko, Shinya, and many civilians let out sighs of relief and cheers of joy. Sensing that Deboth Hell is no more, and as the Zyudenryu attack his original body, Deboth is destroyed as Daigo is consumed in the Frozen Castle's destruction. Days later, with Canderrilla and Luckyulo deciding to help people after helping a little girl in need of cheering up find her mother, the Kyoryugers resume their usual lives before their Zyudenchi activate. Meeting up with the Zyudenryu, the Kyoryugers are reunited with Daigo as he reveals the Zyudenryu saved him at the last second and tells them that someone else is behind Deboth's action. Although he thinks that they should deal with that evil later, Daigo waits to honor his promise to Amy by treating her to a strawberry parfait.
