= List of Ohsama Sentai King-Ohger characters =

Ohsama Sentai King-Ohger (王様戦隊キングオージャー, Ōsama Sentai Kinguōjā) is a Japanese tokusatsu series that serves as the 47th installment in the Super Sentai franchise and the fourth entry in the Reiwa era.

== Main characters ==
=== Ohsama Sentai ===
The main heroes of Ohsama Sentai King-Ohger. Top: Yanma Gast, Gira Husty, and Rita Kaniska. Bottom: Hymeno Ran, Jeramie Brasieri, and Kaguragi Dybowski.

The eponymous Ohsama Sentai are four monarchs and an orphaned prince from the planet Chikyu (チキュー, Chikyū), (Note: An alternate rendering in katakana of chikyū (ちきゅう) the Japanese word for the Earth in hiragana.) descendants of Earthlings who migrated to the planet two millennia ago. They are chosen by their Ohger Calibur (オージャカリバー, Ōja Karibā) sword to rule their respective kingdoms and function as their symbol of authority while enabling them to transform. Each member carries a Kings Weapon (キングズウエポン, Kinguzu Uepon) sidearm, which can be reconfigured into varying forms, such as Shield Mode (盾モード, Tate Mōdo), and a Kings Hotline (キングズホットライン, Kinguzu Hottorain) smartphone, which doubles as their belt buckle.

They are later joined by the half-Bug Naraku son of the lost sixth hero, and form a new alliance under the name of Ohsama Sentai King-Ohger. (Note: The official name of Ohsama Sentai King-Ohger is the Five Kingdom Abnormal Affairs Countermeasure Strategic Rescue Squad (五王国異様事案対策用戦略救命部隊, Go Ōkoku Kotosama Jian Taisakuyō Senryaku Kyūmei Butai). Five is later changed to Six (六, Roku).) Over the course of the series, Gira and Jeramie also become rulers of their own home countries, making every member of the Ohsama Sentai the rulers of all Chikyu. The Ohsama Sentai later gain access to the Defying Fang Flash (凌牙一閃, Ryōga Issen) ability, which manifests energy projections of certain features based on their personal Shugod when activated, and acquire the power of six special artifacts known as the Proof of the Kings (王の証, Ō no Akashi). The seventh and final member is Gira's older brother and former king of Shugodom, Rcules Husty, who originally was perceived as a tyrant who intended to take over all the kingdoms, but later revealed as secretly planning to defend Chikyu against Dagded and his minions.

Following their victory over the Galactinsects, most of the monarchs decide to go overseas across the galaxy.

==== Gira Husty ====
Gira Husty (ギラ・ハスティー, Gira Hasutī) (Note: Credited by first name until episode 42.) is the crown prince and heir to the throne of Shugodom (シュゴッダム, Shugoddamu), an industrious kingdom that is the strongest and oldest of the five kingdoms where the Shugods were created, whose monarch is based at Caucasus Kabuto Castle (コーカサスカブト城, Kōkasasu Kabuto-jō). His father Causus convinced Dagded Dujardin to create Gira, the entity using his power to magically impregnate Rcules and Gira's mother who died giving birth to the latter. But Causus plotted to use Gira, possessing the same power as his "father", as a weapon against Dagded by feeding the child God Kuwagata's Shugod Soul. But Dagded was counting on Causus attempted betrayal to condition Gira into destroying Chikyu. But when Rcules learned the truth of his family's servitude to the Galactinsects when Dagded had Causus murdered and had his minions cause the Wrath of God incident, taking advantage of his younger brother losing his memories from eating the Shugod Soul, he arranged Gira to be spirited away to an orphanage to live a commoner's life while erasing all traces of his brother's existence from the records so no one could find him.

When the Bug Naraku resurface and commence their attack, Gira ends up reuniting with Rcules and, disillusioned by him putting his ambitions before his subjects' well-being, steals his Ohger Calibur while creating a public persona of the "evil king" of Shugodom to fight the Bug Naraku and overthrow Rcules. But Gira later learns their relationship as brothers while succeeding Rcules in becoming the new king of Shugodom with the help of the four other current monarchs and Jeramie.

For two years since becoming a king, Gira has successfully balanced his country's citizenship and orders under control without any setbacks. Upon learning that the Galactinsects, with whom Kamejim works, had first manipulated his ancestors into starting the civil war between humanity and the Bug Naraku, Gira decides not to become the invaders' puppet, allowing the rest of Chikyu to do the same and strengthen their fighting spirits against their true enemies. Gira later learns the truth about his origin and the truth that Rcules had been secretly protecting him from becoming Galactinsect's puppet king.

Gira can transform into the red-colored Kuwagata Ohger (クワガタオージャー, Kuwagata Ōjā). While transformed, he primarily wields the Kings Weapon in Sword Mode (剣モード, Ken Mōdo), which has an alternate double-bladed Naginata Mode (薙刀モード, Naginata Mōdo) that can be accessed by combining with the Ohger Calibur. He also rides the King Speeder (キングスピーダー, Kingu Supīdā) hoverbike. After returning from Earth, Gira receives his own King Gaburicalibur from Yanma as a secondary sidearm. His Defying Fang Flash grants the use of God Kuwagata's pincers and/or Zyudenryu Gabutyra's tail. Additionally, Gira can assume the following forms:

- King Kuwagata Ohger (キングクワガタオージャー, Kingu Kuwagata Ōjā): Gira's power-up form accessed from the Ohger Crown (オージャクラウン, Ōja Kuraun), also known as the Founder's Crown (始祖の王冠, Shiso no Ōkan), that clads him in gold-colored armor and grants the use of the Ohger Lance (オージャランス, Ōja Ransu). Upon transformation, he combines the Ohger Crown and Ohger Lance to form the Ohger Crown Lance (オージャクラウンランス, Ōja Kuraun Ransu), which allows him to perform varying special attacks based on the Shugods. The Ohger Crown also doubles as his Proof of the Kings, which grants control over God Caucasus Kabuto.
- Goldon Kuwagata Ohger (ゴールドンクワガタオージャー, Gōrudon Kuwagata Ōjā): A special form accessed from the Don Ohger Crown (ドンオージャクラウン, Don Ōja Kuraun), which like the Ohger Crown can combine with the Ohger Lance, that clads Gira in Goldon Momotaro's armor and cape. This form appears exclusively in the V-Cinema Ohsama Sentai King-Ohger vs. Donbrothers.
- Kuwagata Ohger Carnival (クワガタオージャーカーニバル, Kuwagata Ōjā Kānibaru): A special form accessed from the Gaburimix Shooter that clads Gira in Kyoryu Red Carnival's armor. In this form, he wields the Kentrospiker and a pair of Gabutyra Fangs. This form first appears in the V-Cinema Ohsama Sentai King-Ohger vs. Kyoryuger.

Gira Husty is portrayed by Taisei Sakai (酒井 大成, Sakai Taisei). As a child, Gira is portrayed by Sanetoshi Ariyama (有山 実俊, Ariyama Sanetoshi).

==== Yanma Gast ====
Yanma Gast (ヤンマ・ガスト, Yanma Gasuto) is a genius engineer and the president of the technological country of Nkosopa (ンコソパ) who is based at Peta Castle (ペタ城, Peta-jō). He was born in the slums and orphaned at a young age. However, following the Wrath of God incident, Yanma was taught by Gin to use his own efforts and intellect, which allowed him to restore Nkosopa, and since becoming its president, he has used the homemade PC he built as the country's main server.

In the time skip, Yanma ended up in jail for creating a supercomputer that monopolized the planet's electricity before resuming his rule when Chikyu is attacked. After the Shugods sacrificed their bodies to permanently kill Dagded and end the Galactinsects' conspiracy, Yanma manages to preserve the Shugod Souls and is entrusted to build new bodies for them.

In the web-exclusive crossover special Ohsama Sentai King-Ohger in Space, Yanma and Jeramie become archaeologists, hoping to unearth lost technology from an ancient civilization.

Yanma can transform into the blue-colored Tombo Ohger (トンボオージャー, Tonbo Ōjā). While transformed, he primarily wields the Kings Weapon in Gun Mode (銃モード, Jū Mōdo). His Defying Fang Flash grants the use of God Tombo's wings, while his Proof of the Kings is a Nkosopa-crested earring that grants electrokinesis. During the events of the V-Cinema Ohsama Sentai King-Ohger vs. Kyoryuger, Jeramie uses the Gaburimix Shooter to equip Yanma with the right forearm-mounted Stegotchi Shield (ステゴッチシールド, Sutegotchi Shīrudo).

Yanma Gast is portrayed by Aoto Watanabe (渡辺 碧斗, Watanabe Aoto). As a child, Yanma is portrayed by Towa Watanabe (渡邉 斗翔, Watanabe Towa).

==== Hymeno Ran ====
Hymeno Ran (ヒメノ・ラン, Himeno Ran) is a doctor and the queen of Ishabana (イシャバーナ, Ishabāna), a kingdom known for its advanced arts and medicine, who is based at Floputal Castle (フラピュタル城, Furapyutaru-jō). She took over Ishabana when her parents were assassinated by Grodi during the Wrath of God incident 15 years prior.

In the time skip, Hymeno ended up in jail for a fireworks display gone wrong before resuming her rule when Chikyu is attacked. Within the same year, she finally confronts her parents' murderer.

In the web-exclusive crossover special Ohsama Sentai King-Ohger in Space, Hymeo collaborates with Tsurugi Ohtori for an intergalactic peace treaty.

Hymeno can transform into the yellow-colored Kamakiri Ohger (カマキリオージャー, Kamakiri Ōjā). While transformed, she primarily wields the King's Weapon in Sickle Mode (鎌モード, Kama Mōdo), which has an alternate scythe-like mode that can be accessed by combining with the Ohger Calibur. Her Defying Fang Flash grants the use of God Kamakiri's raptorials, while her Proof of the Kings is an Ishabana-crested tiara that grants life-absorbing capabilities. During the events of the V-Cinema Ohsama Sentai King-Ohger vs. Kyoryuger, Jeramie uses the Gaburimix Shooter to equip Hymeno with the left forearm-mounted Zakutor Sword (ザクトルソード, Zakutoru Sōdo) claw.

Hymeno Ran is portrayed by Erica Murakami (村上 愛花, Murakami Erika). As a child, Hymeno is portrayed by Melody Anderson (アンダーソン・メロディー, Andāson Merodī).

==== Rita Kaniska ====
Rita Kaniska (リタ・カニスカ, Rita Kanisuka) is the Chief Justice of the snowy kingdom and penal colony of Gokkan (ゴッカン) who is based at Zaiban Castle (ザイバーン城, Zaibān-jō), where those who are accused of international crimes are judged and imprisoned, regardless of country or status. Each chosen monarch of Gokkan inherits the Ice Seal (氷の封印, Kōri no Fūin), a forbidden magic spell which has been passed down through generations, and can only be used as a last resort to freeze their enemies at the cost of progressively freezing the user. Rita used to have a dream of becoming an idol and living with their parents, before becoming an aide to their predecessor, Karras Dehaan, for five years. Nevertheless, they often visit their parents while off-duty. When the Wrath of God incident occurred, Rita ascended to the throne at age 10 after Karras implanted the Ice Seal on their right eye and faked her death.

In the time skip, Rita voluntarily sent themselves to jail for a break from their duties before resuming them when Chikyu is attacked. Within the same year, they learned that the Galactinsects recently murdered both Karras and Shiron, though their parents are safe and well.

In the web-exclusive crossover special Ohsama Sentai King-Ohger in Space, Rita provides help to the Space Police, entrusted with top secret assignments given by Doggie Kruger to help judge various crimes.

Rita can transform into the violet-colored Papillon Ohger (パピヨンオージャー, Papiyon Ōjā). While transformed, they primarily wield the Kings Weapon in Bow Mode (弓モード, Yumi Mōdo). Their Defying Fang Flash grants the use of God Papillon's wings, while their Proof of the Kings is a Gokkan-crested bracelet that grants cryokinesis. During the events of the V-Cinema Ohsama Sentai King-Ohger vs. Kyoryuger, Jeramie uses the Gaburimix Shooter to equip Rita with the left forearm-mounted Dricera Drill (ドリケラドリル, Dorikera Doriru).

Rita Kaniska is portrayed by Yuzuki Hirakawa (平川 結月, Hirakawa Yuzuki). As a child, Rita is portrayed by Halo Asada (浅田 芭路, Asada Haro).

==== Kaguragi Dybowski ====
Kaguragi Dybowski (カグラギ・ディボウスキ, Kaguragi Dibōsuki) is the overlord of the agricultural kingdom of Tofu (トウフ, Tōfu) who is based at Takitate Castle (タキタテ城, Takitate-jō). Born from a humble family of farmers, he earned his current status when he deposed of his predecessor, Empress Iroki for her apparent crimes of confiscating the food supplies from her people in the aftermath of Wrath of God incident. In reality behind his involvement of Iroki's death, he was about to make amends to return the foods she confiscated from their people, until he learned that her true intentions was to save them after she discovered Grodi poisoned the food supplies to kill their people, and Kaguragi was too late to stop her from sacrificing herself from eating the poisoned foods in their people's steads. After being appointed by Iroki as her successor, Kaguragi was unable to execute her out of kindness, but was forced to watch her die by Grodi's poison before she is consumed by the flame around her inside the burning castle she set up as her burial place instead. Nevertheless, he keeps his predecessor's promise cover the truth behind her sacrifice from the public until Grodi's crime is fully exposed.

In the time skip, Kaguragi ended up in jail for using unsafe gardening practices before resuming his rule when Chikyu is attacked. Within the same year, after Grodi resurrects Iroki without knowing her true nature, Kaguragi makes atonement for being unable to initiate Iroki's order of her execution.

In the web-exclusive crossover special Ohsama Sentai King-Ohger in Space, Kaguragi co-operates with Captain Marvelous for intel.

Kaguragi can transform into the black-colored Hachi Ohger (ハチオージャー, Hachi Ōjā). While transformed, he primarily wields the Kings Weapon in Claw Mode (爪モード, Tsume Mōdo). As a natural born deceiver, he is immune to brainwashing. His Defying Fang Flash grants the use of God Hachi's stinger, while his Proof of the Kings is a Tofu-crested necklace that grants pyrokinesis. During the events of the V-Cinema Ohsama Sentai King-Ohger vs. Kyoryuger, Jeramie uses the Gaburimix Shooter to equip Kaguragi with the right forearm-mounted Parasa Beam Gun (パラサビームガン, Parasa Bīmu Gan) rifle.

Kaguragi Dybowski is portrayed by So Kaku (佳久 創, Kaku Sō).

==== Jeramie Brasieri ====
Jeramie Idmonaraku Ne Brasieri (ジェラミー・イドモナラク・ネ・ブラシエリ, Jeramī Idomonaraku Ne Burashieri) is a 2000-year-old historian and storyteller, and the half-Bug Naraku son of the original Ohsama Sentai's sixth hero who claims to be the king of all Chikyu. His father originally hailed from Earth with a connection to the ancient Kyoryugers and had been fighting the Galactinsects a long time ago, where he and his allies dragged the evil aliens to a different world where Chikyu is to settle the ongoing war. However, after the Galactinsects deceived Bug Naraku to destroy humanity during the war, his father was cast out and erased from history for falling in love with a deserted Bug Naraku princess named Nephila, and gave birth to Jeramie. Following his parents' demises, Jeramie vowed to give them justice by ending the conflict between humanity and Bug Naraku to provide equality for both sides. While confirming to have not aware of the Wrath of God incident where he hibernated during that time, Jeramie fabricated the Ohsama Sentai prophecy, and exploits Dezunaraku VIII by pretending to secretly aid him so he can steal back the Three Great Guardian Deities' Shugod Souls to release the Kumonos Keys (クモノスキー, Kumonosu Kī) and break the seal on the iron mask that his father placed on him to conceal his identity, transforming it back into its original form of the Kumonoslayer (クモノスレイヤー, Kumonosureiyā) short sword.

While initially remaining neutral, Jeramie ultimately decides to aid the Ohsama Sentai when learning Rcules allied with Dezunaraku to conquer the rest of the world. Jeramie then learned that his fabricated prophecy caused the Bug Naraku to attack humans after years of racial persecution, unable to reason with Dezunaraku after revealing they are related. After Dezunaraku's death, he becomes the new ruler of Bug Naraku.

In the time skip, the Galactinsects' attack on his kingdom signals his fellow monarchs to discover the alien organization's conspiracy at Chikyu since ancient times. Jeramie briefly isolates his kingdom from humanity after taking blame for crimes which were caused by the Galactinsects, until he and his fellow monarchs tricks the Galactinsects' leader, Dagded into revealing his organization's conspiracies to the public, thereby clearing Jeramie's name and his kingdom's reputations. When Dagded transported him and his teammates to the Earth, where they met the present day Kyoryugers, Jeramie comes to learn the connections between the Ohsama Sentai and the Kyoryugers through his father's further past lives. Following Rcules' redemption, he tells Jeramie that Lainior may have secretly entrusted Jeramie's father to keep the sixth part of the Proof of the Kings away from the Galactinsects. Jeramie uses his Proof of the Kings as a bullet against Grodi, leading to it being permanently lost.

In the web-exclusive crossover special Ohsama Sentai King-Ohger in Space, Jeramie accompanies Yanma to help unearth ancient technology.

Unlike the primary Ohsama Sentai members, Jeramie utilizes the Change (チェンジ, Chenji) Kumonos Key in conjunction with the Kumonoslayer to transform into the white-colored Spider Kumonos (スパイダークモノス, Supaidā Kumonosu). He also wields the insecticide-like Venomix Shooter (ヴェノミックスシューター, Venomikkusu Shūtā) handgun, which allows him to gain toxikinesis and the ability to cast illusions via the Venomix (ヴェノミックス, Venomikkusu) Kumonos Key, summon and transform God Tarantula into Tarantula Knight via the Change Kumonos Key, and/or summon Guardians Cicada and Pede via the Shugod Kumonos Key. His Defying Fang Flash grants the use of God Tarantula's legs, while his Proof of the Kings is a chest-implanted crystal that grants eternal life. During the events of the V-Cinema Ohsama Sentai King-Ohger vs. Kyoryuger, the Venomix Shooter evolves into the Gaburimix Shooter (ガブリミックスシューター, Gaburimikkusu Shūtā), which grants a series of a Zyudenryu-themed upgrades, such as equipping Jeramie with the left forearm-mounted Bunpachy Ball (ブンパッキーボール, Bunpakkī Bōru) morning star.

Jeramie Brasieri is portrayed by Masashi Ikeda (池田 匡志, Ikeda Masashi), who also serves as the narrator for the series. As a child, Jeramie is portrayed by Tsubasa Nagao (長尾 翼, Nagao Tsubasa).

==== Rcules Husty ====
Rcules Husty (ラクレス・ハスティー, Rakuresu Hasutī) (Note: Pronounced "Racules".) is the former king of Shugodom and older brother of Gira. 17 years ago, he learned the existence of Dagded Dujardin and the Galactinsects after they killed his father Causus before the Wrath of God incident, deciding to stop them while sending Gira away. Winning over the Dybowski siblings, who knew bits of his plan, Rcules resolved to weasel his way into Dagded's favor by forsaking the solidarity dream for Shugodom, he inspired Gira to follow for the guise of a tyrant willing to unify the kingdoms into a world monarchy under his rule at any cost. His next plan was letting the Ohsama Sentai and the Bug Naraku destroy each other, and then ally himself with the Bug Naraku by pretending to ultimately suffer from his downfall and their betrayal while also making the Bug Naraku out to have been manipulating him for years.

Although he is "defeated" by Gira in their second duel for the throne, at the same time his third plan exposed his pretense crimes, Rcules later returns as Shugo Mask (シュゴ仮面, Shugo Kamen), allying himself with Dagded under the guise of a puppet ruler of Shugodom before arranging a vacancy in the jesters so he can join them. Once Dagded gives his Ohger Calibur Zero the power to kill immortals, Rcules finally makes his move to attack Dagded, revealing that his main objective was to dispose of the Galactinsects by feigning his allegiance to them. Afterwards, he is allowed to join the Ohsama Sentai to stop Dagded's plans and atone for his actions. After the Galactinsects are defeated permanently, Rcules returns to his cell at Gokkan, while starting an actual relationship with his wife, Suzume.

Utilizing a prototype of the Ohger Calibur called the Ohger Calibur Zero (オージャカリバーZERO, Ōja Karibā Zero), which only those of the Husty bloodline can wield, Rcules can transform into the silver-colored Ohkuwagata Ohger (オオクワガタオージャー, Ōkuwagata Ōjā). While transformed, he wields a Kings Weapon like the primary Ohsama Sentai members.

Like Gira, Rcules can use the Ohger Crown to transform into the gold-colored King Ohkuwagata Ohger (キングオオクワガタオージャー, Kingu Ōkuwagata Ōjā) where he wields the Ohger Lance.

Rcules Husty is portrayed by Masato Yano (矢野 聖人, Yano Masato). As a teenager, Rcules is portrayed by Yu Fujii (藤井 優, Fujii Yū).

=== Shugods ===
The Shugods (シュゴッド, Shugoddo) (Note: The term "Shugod" is a portmanteau of the Japanese word shugo (守護; lit. "guard") and the English word "god".) are giant mechanical insectoid deities who protect the five kingdoms and are powered by the Shugod Soul (シュゴッドソウル, Shugoddo Sōru) stones. The main Shugods are personally owned by the Ohsama Sentai, whose suits are themed after them, while the auxiliary Shugods can combine with the former to form King-Ohger and its alternate forms. With the exception of God Caucasus Kabuto, all of the Shugods were created by Dagded Dujardin.

- God Kuwagata (ゴッドクワガタ, Goddo Kuwagata): Kuwagata Ohger's personal stag beetle-themed Shugod, nicknamed "Kuwagon" (クワゴン) by Gira, that forms the main body, arms, and thighs of King-Ohger. Its Shugod Soul resides in Gira's body after being made to eat it.
- God Tombo (ゴッドトンボ, Goddo Tonbo): Tombo Ohger's personal dragonfly-themed Shugod, nicknamed "Tombokkuri" (トンボックリ, Tonbokkuri) by Gira, that forms the wings of King-Ohger and the blade and handle of the Shugod Sword.
- God Kamakiri (ゴッドカマキリ, Goddo Kamakiri): Kamakiri Ohger's personal mantis-themed Shugod, nicknamed "Kamarina" (カマリーナ, Kamarīna) by Gira, that forms the right lower leg of King-Ohger.
- God Papillon (ゴッドパピヨン, Goddo Papiyon): Papillon Ohger's personal butterfly-themed Shugod, nicknamed "Papinton" (パピントン, Papinton) by Gira, that forms the head of King-Ohger and the hilt of the Shugod Sword.
- God Hachi (ゴッドハチ, Goddo Hachi): Hachi Ohger's personal hornet-themed Shugod, nicknamed "Hachisuke" (ハチスケ) by Gira, that forms the left lower leg of King-Ohger.
- God Tentou (ゴッドテントウ, Goddo Tentō): A pair of ladybug-themed auxiliary Shugods, nicknamed "Tete" (テテ) and "Toto" (トト) by Gira, that form the arm bracers of King-Ohger.
- God Kumo (ゴッドクモ, Goddo Kumo): A pair of spider-themed auxiliary Shugods, nicknamed "Kuumo" (クーモ, Kūmo) and "Kumomo" (クモモ) by Gira, that form armor for the chest and waist of King-Ohger.
- God Ant (ゴッドアント, Goddo Anto): An ant-themed auxiliary Shugod, nicknamed "Arlin" (アーリン, Ārin) by Gira, that forms the sliding section of the Shugod Sword.
- Three Great Guardian Deities (三大守護神, San Dai Shugoshin): A trio of supplementary Shugods.
  - God Kabuto (ゴッドカブト, Goddo Kabuto): A Japanese rhinoceros beetle-themed Shugod, nicknamed "Kabutan" (カブタン) by Gira, that can change into the Kabuto Cannon (カブトキャノン, Kabuto Kyanon), which equips onto King-Ohger's right forearm.
  - God Scorpion (ゴッドスコーピオン, Goddo Sukōpion): A scorpion-themed Shugod, nicknamed "Sasorine" (サソリーヌ, Sasorīnu) and "Scopi" (すこピ, Sukopi) by Gira and Hymeno respectively, that can produce Shugod Poison (シュゴッドポイズン, Shugoddo Poizun) and change into the Scorpion Claw (スコーピオンクロー, Sukōpion Kurō), which equips onto King-Ohger's left forearm.
  - God Hopper (ゴッドホッパー, Goddo Hoppā): A grasshopper-themed Shugod, nicknamed "Batta" (バッタ) by Gira, that can change into the Hopper Armor (ホッパーアーマー, Hoppā Āmā), which equips onto King-Ohger's chest and shins.
- God Tarantula (ゴッドタランチュラ, Goddo Taranchura): Spider Kumonos' personal tarantula-themed Shugod, nicknamed "Tarantino" (タランチーノ, Taranchīno) by Gira, that can take control of other Shugods. It can also assume a humanoid form called Tarantula Knight (タランチュラナイト, Taranchura Naito) where it wields the Tarantula Buster (タランチュラバスター, Taranchura Basutā) cannon.
- God Caucasus Kabuto (ゴッドコーカサスカブト, Goddo Kōkasasu Kabuto): King Kuwagata Ohger's personal Caucasus beetle-themed Shugod that assumes the form of Caucasus Kabuto Castle when not in battle. It can also assume a humanoid form called King Caucasus Kabuto (キングコーカサスカブト, Kingu Kōkasasu Kabuto). It is later revealed to be a spaceship that can travel across galaxies and bring humans from Earth to Chikyu.

==== Guardian Weapons ====
The Guardian Weapons (ガーディアンウエポン, Gādian Uepon) are smaller Shugods that can change into weapons for King-Ohger, Tarantula Knight, and King Caucasus Kabuto to use in battle.

- Guardian Rolling (ガーディアンローリング, Gādian Rōringu): A pill bug-themed Guardian Weapon that can change into the Rolling Hammer (ローリングハンマー, Rōringu Hanmā) flail, which is primarily wielded by King-Ohger.
- Guardian Snail (ガーディアンスネイル, Gādian Suneiru): A snail-themed Guardian Weapon that can change into the Snail Gatling (スネイルガトリング, Suneiru Gatoringu) rotary gun, which is primarily wielded by King-Ohger.
- Guardian Cicada (ガーディアンシケイダー, Gādian Shikeidā): A cicada-themed Guardian Weapon that can change into the Cicada Blade (シケイダーブレード, Shikeidā Burēdo) claw, which is primarily wielded by Tarantula Knight.
- Guardian Pede (ガーディアンピード, Gādian Pīdo): A centipede-themed Guardian Weapon that can change into the Pede Chainsaw (ピードチェーンソー, Pīdo Chēnsō), which is primarily wielded by Tarantula Knight.
- Guardian Hercules (ガーディアンヘラクレス, Gādian Herakuresu): A Hercules beetle-themed Guardian Weapon that can change into the Hercules Axe (ヘラクレスアックス, Herakuresu Akkusu), which is primarily wielded by King Caucasus Knight.

==== Shugod Zeros ====
The Shugod Zeros (シュゴッドZERO, Shugoddo Zero) are artificial versions of King-Ohger's components.

- God Kuwagata Zero (ゴッドクワガタZERO, Goddo Kuwagata Zero): An artificial God Kuwagata that can hijack the Shugods to assume God Kuwagata's place in the King-Ohger formation.
- God Tombo Zero (ゴッドトンボZERO, Goddo Tonbo Zero): An artificial God Tombo.
- God Kamakiri Zero (ゴッドカマキリZERO, Goddo Kamakiri Zero): An artificial God Kamakiri.
- God Papillon Zero (ゴッドパピヨンZERO, Goddo Papiyon Zero): An artificial God Papillon.
- God Hachi Zero (ゴッドハチZERO, Goddo Hachi Zero): An artificial God Hachi.
- God Tentou Zero (ゴッドテントウZERO, Goddo Tentō Zero): A pair of artificial God Tentou.
- God Kumo Zero (ゴッドクモZERO, Goddo Kumo Zero): A pair of artificial God Kumo.
- God Ant Zero (ゴッドアントZERO, Goddo Anto Zero): An artificial God Ant.

==== Other Shugods ====
- Tarantula Abyss (タランチュラアビス, Taranchura Abisu): A miniature variant of God Tarantula who served as Dezunaraku VIII's sole companion despite the latter's hatred for Shugods in general. Following Dezunaraku VIII's death by Kamejim's hands, Tarantula Abyss paid a final respect to the former Bug Naraku ruler before leaving for parts unknown. It returned two years later during the Chikyu populations' war with the Galactinsects, where it grants Dezunaraku VIII his own variant of Defying Fang Flash to finish off Kamejim before seeing its partner returning to Hakabaka.
- Cicada Shugod: A swarm of Shugods that resemble Guardian Cicada. As most of them were harvested by the Bug Naraku for their Shugod Souls, Grodie manipulated their corpses to instigate the Wrath of God incident.

==== Ohsama Combinations ====
- King-Ohger: The Ohsama Sentai's eponymous giant robot composed of Gods Kuwagata, Tombo, Kamakiri, Papillon, Hachi, Tentou, Kumo, and Ant that wields the Shugod Sword (シュゴッドソード, Shugoddo Sōdo).
  - Kabuto King-Ohger (カブトキングオージャー, Kabuto Kinguōjā): A combination of King-Ohger and God Kabuto. Rcules can also perform a God Kuwagata Zero variant of this formation using God Kabuto's corrupted Shugod Soul.
  - Scorpion King-Ohger (スコーピオンキングオージャー, Sukōpion Kinguōjā): A combination of King-Ohger and God Scorpion.
  - Hopper King-Ohger (ホッパーキングオージャー, Hoppā Kinguōjā): A combination of King-Ohger and God Hopper.
  - Legend King-Ohger (レジェンドキングオージャー, Rejendo Kinguōjā): A combination of King-Ohger and the Three Great Guardian Deities. It is said to be the true form of King-Ohger during the first battle against Bug Naraku before the Three Great Guardian Deities choose to split from the humans.
  - King-Ohger (God Kuwagata ZERO ver.) (キングオージャー (ゴッドクワガタZEROver.), Kingu-Ōjā (Goddo Kuwagata Zero Bājon)): An alternate combination with God Kuwagata Zero replacing God Kuwagata, which grants Rcules complete control over the formation.
  - Extreme King-Ohger (エクストリームキングオージャー, Ekusutorīmu Kinguōjā): A combination of King-Ohger, God Tarantula, and the Three Great Guardian Deities. It first appears in an incomplete state via God Tarantula just webbing itself onto Legend King-Ohger, resulting in the latter struggling to maneuver without falling apart during its debut battle against Genji Bodarujim.
  - God King-Ohger (ゴッドキングオージャー, Goddo Kinguōjā): A combination of King-Ohger, God Tarantula, God Caucasus Kabuto, the Three Great Guardian Deities, and the Guardian Weapons. It is a combination so complex to operate that during its first assembly, each one of the 20 Shugods that compose it had to be piloted by a different individual. During the final battle against Dagded, it becomes an enlarged version of itself, also known as Transcendental Raging Ultimate Perfect King-Ohger (超絶怒涛究極完全体キングオージャー, Chōzetsu Dotō Kyūkyoku Kanzentai Kinguōjā), through the primary Ohsama Sentai members' Proof of the Kings and the life energy of Chikyu's people where it sacrifices its body to destroy his domain.
  - Don King-Ohger (ドンキングオージャー, Don Kinguōjā): A combination of King-Ohger and Don Robotaro that replaces the former's head with Don Onitaijin's. This combination appears exclusively in episode 45 of Avataro Sentai Donbrothers.
- King-Ohger Zero (キングオージャーZERO, Kinguōjā Zero): Ohkuwagata Ohger's personal giant robot composed of all the Shugod Zeros that wields the Shugod Sword Zero (シュゴッドソードZERO, Shugoddo Sōdo Zero). It is destroyed by Extreme King-Ohger. King-Ohger Zero was originally an instrumental part of his plan against Dagded, since it could not be controlled by the alien.
- King Kyoryuzin (キングキョウリュウジン, Kingu Kyōryūjin): A Zyuden Giant composed of Zyudenryu Gabutyra and Gods Tombo, Kamakiri, Papillon, and Hachi that wields the Shugod Sword.
- King Boonboomger Robo (キングブンブンジャーロボ, Kingu Bunbunjā Robo): A combination of Boonboom Trailer, Racing, and Gods Tombo, Papillon, and Ant. This combination appears exclusively in the V-Cinema Bakuage Sentai Boonboomger vs. King-Ohger.
- King Byunbyum Mach Robo (キングビュンビュンマッハーロボ, Kingu Byunbyun Mahhā Robo): A combination of Byunbyum Mach and Gods Tentou, Kabuto, and Scorpion. This combination appears exclusively in the V-Cinema Bakuage Sentai Boonboomger vs. King-Ohger.

== Recurring characters ==
=== Underground Empire Bug Naraku ===
The Underground Empire Bug Naraku (地帝国バグナラク, Chiteikoku Bagu Naraku) is an alien race of humanoid arthropods originating from a previous unknown planet that Grodi destroyed as part Dagded's design, immigrating to Chikyu where they made a new life. They originally resembled humans before evolving into their current forms from eating Shugod Souls. They waged war against the humans who emigrated from Earth to Chikyu 2000 years ago, but were defeated and driven underground by Legend King-Ohger. They return in the present time for a second invasion, but were initially manipulated by Jeramie Brasieri into acquiring the Three Great Guardian Deities for him. But in reality, the Bug Naraku only attacked the humans because of the ages-long prejudice caused by Jeramie's prophecy, and were eventually revealed to be Dagded's agent Kamejim. After Dezunaraku VIII's death, Bug Naraku is ruled over by Jeramie and officially recognized as the sixth kingdom; In-between Land Bug Naraku (狭間の国バグナラク, Hazama no Kuni Bagunaraku).

The Bug Naraku harvested the Shugod Souls of the cicada-themed Shugods from the Wrath of God incident so they enlarge by eating one, assumed by many that eating a Shugod Soul results in the consumer's death. But in reality, the act seals away the consumer's memories and make them forget who they are.

==== Dezunaraku VIII ====
Abyss King Dezunaraku VIII (奈落王デズナラク8世, Narakuō Dezunaraku Hassei) is the earthworm-themed ruler of Bug Naraku who seeks to exterminate all humans so Bug Naraku can rule the entire world unopposed, having embraced what humans thought of his kind and encouraged his minions to take down as many humans as they can. But when that failed, Dezunaraku decides to execute Chikyu Destruction Plan (チキュー破壊計画, Chikyū Hakai Keikaku) to destroy Chikyu at the cost of his life in an act of mutual assured destruction before God King-Ohger ruined the plan. Though he finally accepts his defeat and passes his throne to Jeramie, and is convinced by Gira to end the cycle of hatred between their respective Chikyu races, Dezunaraku is betrayed and killed by Kamejim.

Two years after an alien force which Kamejim truly works for, the Galactinsects reveal themselves, until the Ohsama Sentai, including a redeem Rcules, dispose all of its jesters, with only Kamejim left, Dezunaraku and other victims of Galactinsects are temporarily resurrected from Hakabaka to aid their fellow people of Chikyu against their true enemy force, with Dezunaraku dragging Kamejim with him to the spirit realm, and thereby leaving Dagded powerless and to die at the hands of King-Ohger.

In battle, Dezunaraku VIII can generate tentacles from his back and wields the Naraclaymore (ナラクレイモア, Narakureimoa) sword.

Dezunaraku VIII is voiced by Tomoyuki Shimura (志村 知幸, Shimura Tomoyuki).

==== Daigorg ====
Deathblow General Daigorg (一撃将軍ダイゴーグ, Ichigeki Shōgun Daigōgu) is a horned dung beetle-themed warrior of Bug Naraku who was killed by Jeramie's mother, Nephila, during the Bug Naraku civil war. In the present, he is revived through Rcules' help. He later eats the Shugod Souls of God Tarantula and the three Guardian Deities in an attempt to wipe out Shugodom, only to be destroyed by King Caucasus Kabuto with the Shugod Souls released. He is later resurrected, only to be destroyed by God King-Ohger.

In battle, Daigorg wields the Daikocrusher (ダイコクラッシャー, Daikokurasshā) pickaxe.

Daigorg is voiced by Kōsuke Takaguchi (高口 公介, Takaguchi Kōsuke).

==== Sanagims ====
The Sanagims (サナギム, Sanagimu) are Bug Naraku's pupa-themed foot soldiers that wield Gun Shovel (ガンショベル, Gan Shoberu) spades.

==== Kaijims ====
The Kaijims (怪ジーム, Kaijīmu) are Bug Naraku's monsters, serving as field leaders to guide the Sanagims in the fight against the Ohsama Sentai and their respective kingdoms. Through Dezunaraku VIII's help, a few of the Kaijims can be upgraded into Dezu (デズ) variants by augmenting their cocoons with his tentacles, granting them the left forearm-mounted Claw Worm (クローワーム, Kurō Wāmu). Following Jeramie's ascension to Bug Naraku's throne, subsequent Kaijims were either rogue factions seeking advantage of the ensuing chaos or zombies serving the Galactinsects.

- Danjim (ダンジーム, Danjīmu): A pill bug-themed monster. It is destroyed by King-Ohger.
  - Dezu-Danjim (デズダンジーム, Dezu Danjīmu): An enhanced version of Danjim. It is destroyed by Legend King-Ohger.
  - Diamond Danjim (ダイヤモンドダンジーム, Daiyamondo Danjīmu): An enhanced version of Danjim. It is destroyed by Extreme King-Ohger. A resurrected Diamond Danjim is destroyed by Tombo Ohger. Voiced by Susumu Chiba (千葉 進歩, Chiba Susumu).
- Bodarujim (ボダルジーム, Bodarujīmu): A firefly-themed monster. It is destroyed by King-Ohger. Voiced by Naoyuki Shimozuru (下鶴 直幸, Shimozuru Naoyuki).
  - Dezu-Bodarujim (デズボダルジーム, Dezu Bodarujīmu): An enhanced version of Bodarujim. It is destroyed by Legend King-Ohger.
  - Genji Bodarujim (ゲンジボダルジーム, Genji Bodarujīmu): A genji firefly-themed version of Bodarujim. It is destroyed by an imperfect version of Extreme King-Ohger.
- Funjim (フンジーム, Funjīmu): A dung beetle-themed monster. It is destroyed by King-Ohger. Voiced by Ryuzou Ishino (石野 竜三, Ishino Ryūzō).
  - Dezu-Funjim (デズフンジーム, Dezu Funjīmu): An enhanced version of Funjim. It is destroyed by Legend King-Ohger.
- Tanijim (タニジーム, Tanijīmu): A river snail-themed monster. It is destroyed by Kabuto King-Ohger.
  - Dezu-Tanijim (デズタニジーム, Dezu Tanijīmu): An enhanced version of Tanijim. It is destroyed by Legend King-Ohger.
- Jigokujim (ジゴクジーム, Jigokujīmu): An antlion-themed monster. It is destroyed by King-Ohger. A resurrected Jigokujim is defeated by Rcules. Voiced by Keikō Sakai (酒井 敬幸, Sakai Keikō).
  - Dezu-Jigokujim (デズジゴクジーム, Dezu Jigokujīmu): An enhanced version of Jigokujim. It is destroyed by Legend King-Ohger.
- Gundajim (グンダジーム, Gundajīmu): An army ant-themed monster. It is destroyed by Scorpion King-Ohger. It is later resurrected. Voiced by Bin Shimada (島田 敏, Shimada Bin).
- Nagabajim (ナガバジーム, Nagabajīmu): A parasitoid wasp-themed monster. It is destroyed by Legend King-Ohger. A resurrected Nagabajim is destroyed by Kuwagata Ohger. Voiced by Rikako Aikawa (愛河 里花子, Aikawa Rikako).
- Amenjim (アメンジーム, Amenjīmu): A water strider-themed monster. It is destroyed by God Tarantula. A resurrected Amenjim is destroyed by Papillon Ohger. Voiced by Nobuo Tobita (飛田 展男, Tobita Nobuo).
- Baejim (バエジーム, Baejīmu): A fly-themed monster. It is destroyed by Tarantula Knight. Voiced by Atsushi Abe (阿部 敦, Abe Atsushi).
  - Kin Baejim (キンバエジーム, Kin Baejīmu): A blow fly-themed version of Baejim. It is destroyed by King Kyoryuzin. It is later resurrected. Voiced by Atsushi Abe.
- Ogerajim (ヲゲラジーム, Ogerajīmu): A mole cricket-themed monster. It is destroyed by Tarantula Knight. A resurrected Ogerajim is destroyed by Hachi Ohger. Voiced by Kenichirou Matsuda (松田 健一郎, Matsuda Ken'ichirō).
- Iragajim (イラガジーム, Iragajīmu): An oriental moth-themed monster. It is destroyed by King Kuwagata Ohger. A resurrected Iragajim is destroyed by Extreme King-Ohger. Voiced by Eiji Takemoto (竹本 英史, Takemoto Eiji).
- Zarigajim (ザリガジーム, Zarigajīmu): A crayfish-themed monster. It is destroyed by Extreme King-Ohger, which later destroys a resurrected Zarigajim. Voiced by Daisuke Sakaguchi (阪口 大助, Sakaguchi Daisuke).

===== Other Kaijims =====
- Shidejim (シデジーム, Shidejīmu): A carrion beetle-themed monster who appears exclusively in the web-exclusive series Ohsama Sentai King-Ohger: The Secrets of King Rcules. Shidejim kills scientist Vedalia to keep her corpse in his body to use her memories. He is killed by Rcules. Voiced by Tsubasa Yonaga (代永 翼, Yonaga Tsubasa).

=== Galactinsects ===
The Galacinsects.

The Galactinsects (宇蟲, Uchū) are a group of intergalactic monsters led by Dagded Dujardin, their goal being to torment, and ultimately destroy, other worlds for their master's amusement.

==== Dagded Dujardin ====
Galactinsect King Dagded Dujardin (宇蟲王ダグデド・ドゥジャルダン, Uchūō Dagudedo Dujarudan) is a tiny, water bear-themed being of vast power who pilots a humanoid body, introduces himself as the "King of the Universe", and is the true antagonist of the series, a destroyer of worlds who decides to abuse his position by manipulating the denizens of countless worlds to kill each other for his amusement. Forcing the Husty family into his service, Dagded left Kamejim and Grodi on Chikyu to instigate the war between humans and Bug Naraku and had the duo cause the Wrath of God incident and kill Causus Husty for the king plotting to use Gira against them. Having revived the Deboth Army to conquer Earth, Dagded arrives at Chikyu two years after the human/Bug Naraku war to force the conflict's renewal while threatening to slaughter everyone on the planet. He initially planned to cause a scandal to force Bug Naraku back into being hated, but was tricked into revealing his organization's conspiracies to the public. Dagded responds to this by sending the rulers to Earth in hopes the Deboth Army could dispose of them, using their absence to set up Rcules Husty as his puppet ruler on Chikyu. He also captured a Kyoryuger leader, Daigo Kiryu, Kyoryu Red, imprisoning him inside his amber necklace. But Dagded is unaware that Rcules was plotted against him and made his move the moment he turned the human's sword into a god-killing weapon to get rid of Gira, a creation of Dagded's that refuses to obey him. Dagded ends up being killed by the Husty brothers when Gira uses his brother's Ohger Calibur Zero to strike him down. But Dagded regenerates himself through the clone body he concealed in Minongan Mouz, deciding to make an example of Chikyu for defying him. Eventually, following the destruction of his domain by an enlarged God King-Ohger, he is killed by the Ohsama Sentai, thereby freeing the captured Daigo Kiryu. The clone body he concealed underground on Earth is later awakened by Minongan and the Kurumaju Manhole Gurumar and absorbed into the Kurumaju.

In battle, Dagded can summon multiple Blood Fork (ブラッドフォーク, Buraddo Fōku) swords from portals.

Dagded Dujardin is voiced by Akira Ishida (石田 彰, Ishida Akira).

==== Five Galactinsect Jesters ====
The Five Galactinsect Jesters (宇蟲五道化, Uchū Go Dōke) are Dagded Dujardin's five subordinates who commit atrocities for their master's amusement.

===== Kamejim Unka =====
Kamejim Unka (カメジム・ウンカ, Kamejimu Unka), also known as Kamejim the Flamboyant (虚飾のカメジム, Kyoshoku no Kamejimu), is the stink bug-themed subordinate of Dagded who was sent to Chikyu and caused the conflict between the humans and the Bug Naraku, infiltrating the latter as Dezunaraku VIII's right hand Prime Minister Kamejim (宰相カメジム, Saishō Kamejimu). He also killed the Husty family's aide, Bocimar, before the series to spy on Rcules' supporter until his true identity is exposed to the public. When Dezunaraku decided to give humans a chance before falling back when overpowered by the Shugods, Kamejim assassinates him. Following the time skip, Kamejim returns to Dagded's side when his master arrives to conquer Chikyu. During Hymeno's absence, Kamejim is installed by Dagded as puppet ruler of Ishabana until she liberates her kingdom. During a final battle, Jeramie has Kamejim defeated by both vengeful Rcules and Dezunaraku, with the latter dragging him alive into Hakabaka where he is being tormented for eternity alongside Grodi.

In battle, Kamejim wields the bolt-like Mushimarupin (ムシマルピン) staff.

Kamejim Unka is voiced by Shin-ichiro Miki (三木 眞一郎, Miki Shin'ichirō). While posing as Bocimar, he is portrayed by Jubun Fukuzawa.

===== Goma Rosalia =====
Goma Rosalia (ゴーマ・ローザリア, Gōma Rōzaria), also known as Goma the Dubious (胡乱のゴーマ, Uron no Gōma), is a longhorn beetle-themed ninja warrior. During Rita's absence, Goma is installed by Dagded as puppet ruler of Gokkan until they liberate their kingdom. He is destroyed by the Ohsama Sentai in Rcules' scheme to take his place among the jesters, as the means to gain an immortal killer power from Dagded and kill him.

In battle, Goma dual wields the twin Kamikiri (神斬) katanas.

Goma Rosalia is voiced by Kazuhiro Yamaji (山路 和弘, Yamaji Kazuhiro).

===== Hilbil Lich =====
Hilbil Lich (ヒルビル・リッチ, Hirubiru Ritch), also known as Hilbil the Enticing (篭絡のヒルビル, Rōraku no Hirubiru), is a leech-themed manipulation specialist. During Yanma's absence, Hilbil is installed by Dagded as puppet ruler of Nkosopa until he finally liberates his kingdom. She is destroyed by King-Ohger.

While normally unable to brainwash those who inherited Dagded's gene like Gira, Hilbil cannot brainwash normal humans with special wills, like Kaguragi.

Hilbil Lich is voiced by Miyuki Sawashiro (沢城 みゆき, Sawashiro Miyuki).

===== Minongan Mouz =====
Minongan Mouz (ミノンガン・モウズ, Minongan Mōzu), also known as Minongan the Hidden (秘匿のミノンガン, Hitoku no Minongan), is a bagworm moth-themed physically strong warrior and a living cocoon that Dagded uses to recreate his physical body. He is sealed away in ice by Rita, who is aided by Kaguragi to balance their Proof of the Kings' powers.

Minongan's power connects to different timelines. After a Kyoryuger Daigo Kiryu was revealed to be captured by Dagded all along until he is freed by the Ohsama Sentai, Daigo seeks the monarchs' aid to find Prince and Utsusemimaru, by temporarily unsealing Minongan-prime and using its power, so Daigo can travel through time to find his son and ally. Unsealed by the Kurumaju Manhole Gurumar, Minongan cooperates with the Kurumaju to awaken Dagded's clone body. He is ultimately destroyed by Papillon Ohger, Hachi Ohger, Champion Bun Black, and Bun Violet.

Minongan Mouz is voiced by Tomokazu Seki (関 智一, Seki Tomokazu).

===== Grodi Leucodium =====
Grodi Leucodium (グローディ・ロイコディウム, Gurōdi Roikodiumu), also known as Grodi the Tranquil (静謐のグローディ, Seihitsu no Gurōdi), is a Leucochloridium paradoxum-themed necromancer who can assume human form. He is a reanimated corpse that Dagded bestowed with the power to continuously reanimate himself and consume Shugod Souls, being responsible for the destruction of the Bug Narak homeworld. 15 years before the start of the series, Grodi is tasked to assassinate Causus Husty and cover his death by causing the Wrath of God incident where he murdered Hymeno's parents and orchestrated the downfall of Iroki. He was found and sealed away by Karras Dehaan soon after. Freed by Kanejim and Minongan two years after the human/Bug Naraku conflict ended, Grodi provides Dagded with an army of undead Sanagim. During Kaguragi's absence, Grodi is installed by Dagded as puppet ruler of Tofu and revives Iroki to oversee his dominion until Kaguragi liberates his kingdom. Hymeno and Jeramie later learn of Grodi's true nature and use Jeramie's Proof of the Kings to grant him true life so they can kill him for good. But the revelation of his true nature and becoming fully alive only made Grodi more dangerous as he causes another Wrath of God, only to be stopped and finally killed by God King-Ohger. While Grodi finally got the death he desired, he is condemned to be tormented by his previous victims at Hakabaka for eternity.

In battle, Grodi wields the Sickle Seeker (シックルシーカー, Shikkuru Shīkā) scythe that doubles as a rifle. He can use his ability to reanimate himself to revive individuals as his undead slaves. Some of Grodi's undead minions retain their free will, such as Iroki.

Grodi Leucodium is portrayed by Kousei Amano (天野 浩成, Amano Kōsei).

== Guest characters ==
=== Shugodom ===
- Duga (ドゥーガ, Dūga): An aide to Husty family. Initially blindly loyal to Rcules, prior his redemption two years later, where the latter reveals the truth behind his facade villainy because of the Galactinsects' conspiracy. Duga also pilots Guardian Hercules in God King-Ohger's formation. Portrayed by Yutaka Morioka (森岡 豊, Morioka Yutaka).
- Bocimar (ボシマール, Boshimāru): An aide to the Husty family who was killed by Kamejim 15 years prior to the series. When a Kuwagata Shugod Soul started take over a young Gira, Bocimar died fighting Kamejim while protecting the young Husty from him. He is temporarily resurrected from Hakabaka to aid his fellow people of Chikyu against Dagded. Portrayed by Jubun Fukuzawa (福澤 重文, Fukuzawa Jūbun).
- Kogane (コガネ) and Bun (ブーン, Būn): Orphans who live at an orphanage in Shugodom and Gira's friends. Bun also pilots God Ant in God King-Ohger's formation. Portrayed by Anna Hoshino (星乃 あんな, Hoshino An'na) and Minato Kiso (木曽 源, Kiso Minato) respectively, while Bun's adult appearance is portrayed by Ken Nakaya (仲谷 憲, Nakaya Ken).
- Goroge (ゴローゲ, Gorōge): A citizen of Shugodom who was initially blindly supporting Rcules two years before his redemption, where he reveals the truth behind his facade of villainy because of the Galactinsects' conspiracy. After all, Galactinsect jesters have been disposed of thanks to a redeemed Rcules, with Kamejim is the only one left, Goroge can survive the jester's ambush and immediately expose his disguise in time. Portrayed by Kotaro Yagi (八木 光太郎, Yagi Kōtarō).
- Vedalia (ベダリア, Bedaria): A scientist who serves Shugodom and appears first in the web-exclusive series Ohsama Sentai King-Ohger: The Secrets of King Rcules. She is killed by Shidejim. She is temporarily resurrected from Hakabaka to aid her fellow people of Chikyu against Dagded. Portrayed by Ami Tomite (冨手 麻妙, Tomite Ami).
- Kofuki (コフキ): A researcher of Shugodom and Vedalia's assistant who first appears in the web-exclusive series Ohsama Sentai King-Ohger: The Secrets of King Rcules. Following the incident of Vedalia's death, Kofuki took over for her. After Bug Naraku's temporary occupation of Caucasus Kabuto Castle, he was left locked in a secret laboratory of the castle until he was found malnourished. During a final battle against the Galactinsects, Kofuki is saved by both Jeramie, Rcules and a temporary resurrected Dezunaraku from being assassinated by Kamejim. He also pilots God Caucasus Kabuto in God King-Ohger's formation. Portrayed by Kaisei Kawano (川野 快晴, Kawano Kaisei).
- Lainior Husty (ライニオール・ハスティー, Rainiōru Hasutī): The founder king of Shugodom, Gira and Rcules' ancestor, and ruler of the land of the dead, Hakabaka (ハーカバーカ, Hākabāka), whose name was mentioned during Gira's first day as a king prior to his physical debut in the film Ohsama Sentai King-Ohger the Movie: Adventure Heaven. Using the Ohger Calibur Zero, he can transform into a monstrous version of Kuwagata Ohger. Later to have been revealed to have been forced into Dagded's service ages ago, Lainior foresaw an impending crisis and seeks to prevent it by sacrificing Devonica to be resurrected so he can resume ruling Shugodom and unify the world against the Galactinsects. He is ultimately defeated by the Ohsama Sentai and entrusts the future of Chikyu to them. Long after the monarchs left Hakabaka, Dagded initially thought to have destroyed Lainior immediately at the said spirit realm, but unaware that the latter survive the attack because of his undead status. Lainior is temporarily resurrected from Hakabaka to aid his fellow people of Chikyu against Dagded. Portrayed by Nakamura Shidō II (中村 獅童).
- Devonica (デボニカ, Debonika): A guide to Hakabaka and Gira's childhood friend who has to sacrifice herself for Lainior's resurrection, who first appeared in the film Ohsama Sentai King-Ohger the Movie: Adventure Heaven. Her bloodline, whose members are capable of freely traveling to Hakabaka while alive, has a long history of spying on members of the Husty family for Lainior and having his successors meet him. She lived at an orphanage, where Gira was raised, to spy on him until she became twenty. She opens the door to Hakabaka to resurrect the Hakabaka inhabitants to aid her fellow people of Chikyu against Dagded. As her powers can only resurrect individuals for a few minutes, the people she resurrected must return to Hakabaka immediately before they cease to exist. Portrayed by Ayane Sakura (佐倉 綾音, Sakura Ayane).
- Causus Husty (コーサス・ハスティー, Kōsasu Hasutī): The former king of Shugodom and father of Rcules, as well as the previous Ohkuwagata Ohger, who was killed by both Kamejim and Grodi 15 years prior to the series for conspiring against Dagded by using his youngest son Gira as a weapon against him, resulting the Wrath of God incident until Rcules stopped it through faking his loyalty towards Dagded after he faked Gira's death. Portrayed by Nakamura Shidō II, who also portrays Lainior Husty.

=== Nkosopa ===
- Shiokara (シオカラ): An aide to Yanma Gast, who alongside Akka, Usuba, and Mayuta formerly worked for Suji. Shiokara also pilots Guardian Rolling in God King-Ohger's formation. Portrayed by Yuhei Chiwata (千綿 勇平, Chiwata Yūhei).
- Akka (アッカ), Usuba (ウスバ), and Mayuta (マユタ): Citizens of Nkosopa who formerly worked with Shiokara for Suji. They also pilot both God Tentou and one of the God Kumo in God King-Ohger's formation. Portrayed by Hokuto Minami (南 北斗, Minami Hokuto), Kaito Okano (岡野 海斗, Okano Kaito) and Nagisa Hayakawa (早川 渚紗, Hayakawa Nagisa) respectively.
- Gin (ギン): Yanma's teacher, who learned about computers from Jeramie, and shortly after the Wrath of God incident, where he taught a young Yanma about them. Portrayed by Ken Yoshizawa (吉澤 健, Yoshizawa Ken).
- Suji (スジ): The boss of the criminal organization to which Shiokara, Akka, Usuba, and Mayuta once belonged. In the present, Suji is a prisoner in Gokkan. Portrayed by Tetsu Inada (稲田 徹, Inada Tetsu).

=== Ishabana ===
- Sebastian (セバスチャン, Sebasuchan): Hymeno Ran's 25-year-old personal butler who dresses as an old man at her request. His real name is Romane Dearborn (ロマーネ・ディアーボーン, Romāne Diābōn), the heir to a ducal family who hid his true identity from causing problems to his country after Hymeno saved him from committing suicide. Sebastian also pilots God Scorpion in God King-Ohger's formation. Portrayed by Hiroto Yoshimitsu (吉満 寛人, Yoshimitsu Hiroto), while his real appearance is portrayed by Minami (美波).
- Creo Urbanus (クレオ・ウルバヌス, Kureo Urubanusu): The chief maid at Floputal Castle. Creo also pilots Guardian Snail in God King-Ohger's formation. Portrayed by Matsuri Kamisato (神里 まつり, Kamisato Matsuri).
- Edda (エッダ): The daughter of tailor Kare (カーレ, Kāre). Edda pretends to be a wheelchair user to support her poor family on special aid money until she decides to stand on her own feet thanks to Hymeno. Portrayed by Reon Kondo (近藤 レオン, Kondō Reon).
- Elegans Mon (エレガンス・モーン, Eregansu Mōn): A medical team leader of Ishabana. Elegans also pilots one of the God Kumo in God King-Ohger's formation. Portrayed by Marina Mizushima (水島 麻理奈, Mizushima Marina).
- Deed (ディード, Dīdo) and Metally (メタリー, Metarī): The previous king and queen of Ishabana and Hymeno's parents, who were assassinated by Grodi during the Wrath of God incident 15 years prior. They are temporarily resurrected from Hakabaka to aid their fellow people of Chikyu against Dagded. Portrayed by Kraus (クラウス, Kurausu) and Alisa Durbrow (ダーブロウ 有紗, Dāburō Arisa) respectively.
- Moffun (もっふん): A large titular yeti protagonist of Gokkan-theme fictional anime series Together With Moffun, produced at Ishabana. The anime was created to comfort Hymeno after the assassinations of her parents in the Wrath of God incident. Gokkan's current monarch Rita is also a fan of the series and owns Moffun merchandise in their private room. In its titular anime, Moffun is voiced by Hōchū Ōtsuka (大塚 芳忠, Ōtsuka Hōchū).

=== Gokkan ===
- Morfonia (モルフォーニャ, Morufōnya): Rita Kaniska's aide and potential successor, who was born a daughter of escape artists in prison. Morfonia also pilots God Hopper in God King-Ohger's formation. Portrayed by Kasumi Hasegawa (長谷川 かすみ, Hasegawa Kasumi).
- Karras Dehaan (カーラス・デハーン, Kārasu Dehān): (Note: Credited by first name.) Rita's predecessor, who faked her death in the aftermath of the Wrath of God incident to hunt down Grodi in secret. Using the Ice Seal, Karras sealed herself and Grodi for 15 years. Two years later, Kamejim unseals both of them and immediately kills Karras. Her corpse is resurrected by Grodi, where it mindlessly attacks Ishabana, until she briefly regains her consciousness upon recognizing a grown-up Rita, and dies. She is temporarily resurrected from Hakabaka to aid her fellow people of Chikyu against Dagded. Portrayed by Rei Yoshii (吉井 怜, Yoshii Rei).
- Shiron (シロン): A doctor and Karras's husband, helping her stage her death so she can track those responsible for the Wrath of God incident, while he lets himself be a scapegoat for a "murder" of his wife. 15 years later, when Rita finally grows up, Shiron is released from his prison, so that he can search for his wife's current whereabouts. Two years later, upon arriving at a site where Karras was sealed with Grodi, Shiron is ambushed and assassinated by Kamejim and Minongan. Portrayed by Kisuke Iida (飯田 基祐, Iida Kisuke).

=== Tofu ===
- Kuroda (クロダ): One of several kuroko-themed aides to Kaguragi Dybowski who keeps his face concealed in public. Kuroda also pilots God Kabuto in God King-Ohger's formation. Portrayed by Hajime Kanzaki (神前 元, Kanzaki Hajime) and voiced by Kohsuke Toriumi (鳥海 浩輔, Toriumi Kōsuke).
- Head farmer: An unnamed representative of farmers in Tofu. Portrayed by Takashi Kikuchi (菊池 隆志, Kikuchi Takashi).
- Suzume Dybowski (スズメ・ディボウスキ, Suzume Dibōsuki): Kaguragi's younger sister. When the Shugodom king Rcules attempts to rule Tofu through a hostile takeover, Suzume pretends to be in love with him to help her brother secure their home country. Until Rcules confesses his crime to the public and lost to his younger brother, Gira, Suzume is finally freed from his burden. Until two years later, where Rcules revealed to be alive and being made a puppet king of Galactinsects by Dagded, Suzume comes to find out Rcules had been secretly good on taking down the alien conspirators, and immediately let her brother know in private. After the Galactinsects have been permanently defeated, she and Rcules become officially a couple. She also pilots Guardian Cicada in God King-Ohger's formation. Portrayed by Mami Kamura (加村 真美, Kamura Mami).
- Iroki (イロキ): Kaguragi's predecessor, who made her physical debut appearance in the film Ohsama Sentai King-Ohger the Movie: Adventure Heaven. While remembered as a food-hording tyrant during the Wrath of God incident, Iroki was actually a kind empress who discovered that Grodi poisoned her country's food supply and destroyed her reputation to confiscate all the food to protect her people and their image. She used her action to have Kaguragi stage a revolt as she ate some of the poisoned food and arranged for Takitate Castle to be burned to destroy the rest. Iroki was unable to have Kaguragi execute her and instead died in the inferno that consumed the castle. After her death, Iroki ends up in Hakabaka, where she becomes part of its ruling class. Brought back to the land of the living while Grodi took over Tofu, Iroki retained her mind and sought to provoke Kaguragi into avenging Grodi's victims and send her soul back to Hakabaka. This time, other Ohsama Sentai besides Kaguragi finally see her as a true heroine after her second death. She is temporarily resurrected from Hakabaka to aid her fellow people of Chikyu against Dagded. Portrayed by Akiko Hinagata (雛形 あきこ, Hinagata Akiko).

=== Bug Naraku ===
- Geroujim (ゲロウジーム, Gerōjīmu): A mayfly-themed Kaijim with illusionist powers who Jeramie recruited to serve as his spy within the Bug Naraku, avoiding the subject of how he is still alive after ingesting a Shugod Soul when he fought God Hopper. He eventually convinces Jeramie that the only way to stop the war between humans and Bug Naraku is for Jeramie to become ruler of all Bug Naraku, also becoming his first subject. Geroujim also pilots Guardian Pede in God King-Ohger's formation. Voiced by Tomokazu Seki, who also voices Minongan Mouz.
- Nephila Idmonaraku Ne (ネフィラ・イドモナラク・ネ, Nefira Idomonaraku Ne): A spider-themed Bug Naraku princess who fell in love with the original Ohsama Sentai's sixth hero, giving birth to their son Jeramie Brasieri at Gokkan. But as her marriage with her husband was forbidden by both of their respective races, all traces of their existences were erased from history as they entrust their son with the Kumonoslayer. The affair also caused civil war to erupt with the Bug Naraku, with Nephila dying to protect her son from Daigorg. Her corpse is resurrected by Grodi until she is destroyed by God King-Ohger as an act of mercy. She is temporarily resurrected from Hakabaka to aid her fellow people of Chikyu against Dagded. Voiced by Kikuko Inoue (井上 喜久子, Inoue Kikuko).

=== Earth ===
- Zyuden Sentai Kyoryuger (獣電戦隊キョウリュウジャー, Jūden Sentai Kyōryūjā): The 37th Super Sentai team.
  - Daigo Kiryu (桐生 ダイゴ, Kiryū Daigo): The current leader of the Kyoryugers, also known as King (キング, Kingu), who can transform into the "Fanged Brave" (牙の勇者, Kiba no Yūsha), Kyoryu Red (キョウリュウレッド, Kyōryū Reddo). He left Earth to pursue Dagded Dujardin, only to be captured by him. Daigo was then rescued by the Ohsama Sentai at the same time he heard his son Prince's voice. Afterwards, he seeks Gira's help to find his son and borrows Jeramie's Venomix Shooter to recover the Ohsama Sentai's memories when Utsusemimaru's meddling with the timeline turned Gira evil. Ryo Ryusei (竜星 涼, Ryūsei Ryō) reprises his role from Zyuden Sentai Kyoryuger.
  - Ian Yorkland (イアン・ヨークランド, Ian Yōkurando): The second-in-command of the Kyoryugers who can transform into the "Bullet Brave" (弾丸の勇者, Dangan no Yūsha), Kyoryu Black (キョウリュウブラック, Kyōryū Burakku). Syuusuke Saito (斉藤 秀翼, Saitō Shūsuke) reprises his role from Zyuden Sentai Kyoryuger.
  - Nobuharu Udo (有働 ノブハル, Udō Nobuharu): A member of the Kyoryugers, also known as Nossan (ノッさん), who can transform into the "Armored Brave" (鎧の勇者, Yoroi no Yūsha), Kyoryu Blue (キョウリュウブルー, Kyōryū Burū). Yamato Kinjo (金城 大和, Kinjō Yamato) reprises his role from Zyuden Sentai Kyoryuger.
  - Souji Rippukan (立風館 ソウジ, Rippūkan Sōji): A member of the Kyoryugers who can transform into the "Slashing Brave" (斬撃の勇者, Zangeki no Yūsha), Kyoryu Green (キョウリュウグリーン, Kyōryū Gurīn). Akihisa Shiono (塩野 瑛久, Shiono Akihisa) reprises his role from Zyuden Sentai Kyoryuger.
  - Amy Yuuzuki (アミィ 結月, Amyi Yūzuki): A member of the Kyoryugers who can transform into the "Horned Brave" (角の勇者, Tsuno no Yūsha), Kyoryu Pink (キョウリュウピンク, Kyōryū Pinku). Ayuri Konno (今野 鮎莉, Konno Ayuri) reprises her role from Zyuden Sentai Kyoryuger.
  - Utsusemimaru (空蝉丸): A member of the Kyoryugers, also known as Utchy (ウッチー, Utchī), who can transform into the "Thundering Brave" (雷鳴の勇者, Raimei no Yūsha), Kyoryu Gold (キョウリュウゴールド, Kyōryū Gōrudo). Like Daigo, he left Earth to pursue Dagded Dujardin. However, his meddling with the timeline to stop the Galactinsects only made things worse when he fed a young Gira too much Shugod Souls, which turned him into an actual evil king. As a result, Utsusemimaru works together with Prince to fix the timeline while reuniting with Daigo. Atsushi Maruyama (丸山 敦史, Maruyama Atsushi) reprises his role from Zyuden Sentai Kyoryuger.
  - Ramirez (ラミレス, Ramiresu): A member of the Kyoryugers who can transform into the "Steel Brave" (鋼の勇者, Hagane no Yūsha), Kyoryu Cyan (キョウリュウシアン, Kyōryū Shian). Robert Baldwin (ロバート・ボールドウィン, Robāto Bōrudowin) reprises his role from Zyuden Sentai Kyoryuger.
  - Tessai (鉄砕): A member of the Kyoryugers who can transform into the "Charging Brave" (激突の勇者, Gekitotsu no Yūsha), Kyoryu Gray (キョウリュウグレー, Kyōryū Gurē). Masayuki Deai (出合 正幸, Deai Masayuki) reprises his role from Zyuden Sentai Kyoryuger.
  - Yayoi Woorushade (弥生ウルシェード, Yayoi Urushēdo): A member of the Kyoryugers who can transform into the "Marine Brave" (海の勇者, Umi no Yūsha), Kyoryu Violet (キョウリュウバイオレット, Kyōryū Baioretto). Marie Iitoyo (飯豊 まりえ, Iitoyo Marie) reprises her role from Zyuden Sentai Kyoryuger.
  - Torin (トリン): The mentor of the Kyoryugers who can transform into the "Flashing Brave" (閃光の勇者, Senkō no Yūsha), Kyoryu Silver (キョウリュウシルバー, Kyōryū Shirubā). Toshiyuki Morikawa (森川 智之, Morikawa Toshiyuki) reprises his voice role from Zyuden Sentai Kyoryuger.
  - Prince (プリンス, Purinsu): A mysterious man from the future who is destined to become king. His true identity is Daigoro Kiryu (桐生 ダイゴロウ, Kiryū Daigorō), the son of Daigo and Amy. When Utsusemimaru accidentally meddles with the timeline, which in turn affects Prince's existence, the two work together to fix the timeline while reuniting with Daigo. Utilizing the God Kuwagata Zyudenchi (獣電池, Jūdenchi; Beast Battery) in conjunction with a variant of the primary Kyoryugers' Gaburicalibur created by Yanma called the King Gaburicalibur (キングガブリカリバー, Kingu Gaburikaribā), Prince can transform into the "Pincer Attack Brave" (挟撃の勇者, Kyōgeki no Yūsha), King Kyoryu Red (キングキョウリュウレッド, Kingu Kyōryū Reddo). Portrayed by Rintaro Kawana (川名 輪太郎, Kawana Rintarō).
- Deboth Army (デーボス軍, Dēbosu-gun): A race of aliens who fought against the Kyoryugers.
  - Kabuto War God Deboth (兜武神デーボス, Kabuto Bushin Dēbosu): The Japanese rhinoceros beetle-themed leader of the new Deboth Army based at Deboth Castle (デーボス城, Dēbosu-jō), Dagded Dujardin having helped the new Deboth Army conquer Earth. He is destroyed by King-Ohger and Kyoryuzin. Voiced by Hisao Egawa (江川 央生, Egawa Hisao).
  - Debo Senking (デーボ・センキング, Dēbo Senkingu): A Debo Monster and enforcer of the new Deboth Army who is themed after seven members of the Deboth Army; Kaos, Dogold, Aigallon, Canderrilla, Luckyulo, Endolf, and D. He is destroyed by Kuwagata Ohger and King Kyoryu Red. Voiced by Shunsuke Takeuchi (武内 駿輔, Takeuchi Shunsuke).
- Canderrilla (キャンデリラ, Kyanderira) and Luckyulo (ラッキューロ, Rakkyūro): Allies of the Kyoryugers and former members of the Deboth Army. Haruka Tomatsu (戸松 遥, Tomatsu Haruka) and Ai Orikasa (折笠 愛, Orikasa Ai) reprise their respective voice roles from Zyuden Sentai Kyoryuger.
- Rika Fukui (福井 理香, Fukui Rika): Nobuharu's niece. Portrayed by Haruna Enomoto (榎本 遥菜, Enomoto Haruna).
- Gentle (ジェントル, Jentoru): A farmer and Amy's former butler. Kentaro Shimazu (島津 健太郎, Shimazu Kentarō) reprises his role from Zyuden Sentai Kyoryuger.
- Yuko Fukui (福井 優子, Fukui Yūko): Nobuharu's younger sister and Rika's mother. Ayumi Kinoshita (木下 あゆ美, Kinoshita Ayumi) reprises her role from Zyuden Sentai Kyoryuger.

== Spin-off characters ==
- Alternate Chikyu: The alternate universe version of Chikyu that is the result of a temporal paradox caused by Utsusemimaru feeding a young Gira too many Shugod Souls during his travel to the past during the events of the V-Cinema Ohsama Sentai King-Ohger vs. Kyoryuger. In this timeline, the first five current monarchs are opposites to their prime counterparts, including Gira, who has become an actual tyrant and a Galactinsect King and uses the Ohger Calibur Zero to transform into a monstrous version of Kuwagata Ohger known as Evil King (イーヴィルキング, Īviru Kingu). After the timeline is fixed, Gira's evil energy is separated from him and becomes its own entity in the form of Evil King, only to be destroyed by Kuwagata Ohger Carnival, Gabutyra Kyoryu Red, and King Kyoryu Red. Evil King is voiced by Taisei Sakai, who also portrays Gira Husty.
- Kasunaraku CXCVIII (カスナラク198世, Kasunaraku Hyaku-kyūjū-hassei): A bombardier beetle-themed descendant of the faction leader who lost to Dezunaraku VIII's faction in a civil war within the empire in the past, who appears exclusively in the stage play Ohsama Sentai King-Ohger: Final Live. He is destroyed by the Ohsama Sentai. Voiced by Tomoyuki Shimura, who also voices Dezunaraku VIII.
- Kasunaraku CXCIX (カスナラク199世, Kasunaraku Hyaku-kyūjū-kyū-sei): Kasunaraku CXCVIII's son who appears exclusively in the stage play Ohsama Sentai King-Ohger: Final Live. He is destroyed by the Boonboomgers. Voiced by Tomoyuki Shimura.
- Kasunaraku CC (カスナラク200世, Kasunaraku Nihyaku-sei): Kasunaraku CXCIX's son who appears exclusively in the stage play Ohsama Sentai King-Ohger: Final Live. After revealing that "Kasunaraku" is a fake name his clan uses and his real name is Go Miidera Gasunaraku (ゴ・ミイデラ・ガスナラク), he is destroyed by the Ohsama Sentai. Voiced by Tomoyuki Shimura.
- Tylerian Donking (タイラー星人ドンキング, Tairā Seijin Donkingu): An Alienizer who appears exclusively in the web-exclusive crossover special Ohsama Sentai King-Ohger in Space. He allies himself with Aihab to steal Gira's Ohger Crown and use it as a false trophy for their scam underground fighting tournament, where the winner will be executed instead of being presented with the crown. A red jewel on his head serves as a scanning key to lock the valuable prizes he and his accomplices stole. He also kidnapped Riki's sister, Dorin, and blackmailed Riki to participate in his rigid tournament, where Gira, Prince, and Utsusemimaru volunteered during their undercover missions. He is destroyed by Kuwagata Ohger Carnival, King Kyoryu Red, and King Ranger. Voiced by Tsuyoshi Hayashi (林 剛史, Hayashi Tsuyoshi) who previously portrayed Hoji Tomasu in Tokusou Sentai Dekaranger.
- Aihab (アイハブ, Aihabu): A surviving member of the Space Pirates Balban who appears exclusively in the web-exclusive crossover special Ohsama Sentai King-Ohger in Space. She infiltrates Shugodom to steal Gira's Ohger Crown when both Gira, Prince, and Utsusemimaru get distracted with their sparring, causing the Ohsama Sentai, in addition to the available past Sentai warriors, to go undercover, while also rescuing the kidnapped Dorin. Once the Sentai warriors' operation is a success and they raid the underground arena, Aihab is arrested. Portrayed by Yuki Masuda (桝田 幸希, Masuda Yuki).
- Bara Breaker (バラブレイカー, Bara Bureikā): A Machine Beast who appears exclusively in the web-exclusive crossover special Ohsama Sentai King-Ohger in Space. It serves as Don King and Aihab's executioner in executing the winner of the final match instead of presenting them the stolen Ohger Crown. It is destroyed by Kuwagata Ohger Carnival, King Kyoryu Red, and King Ranger.
