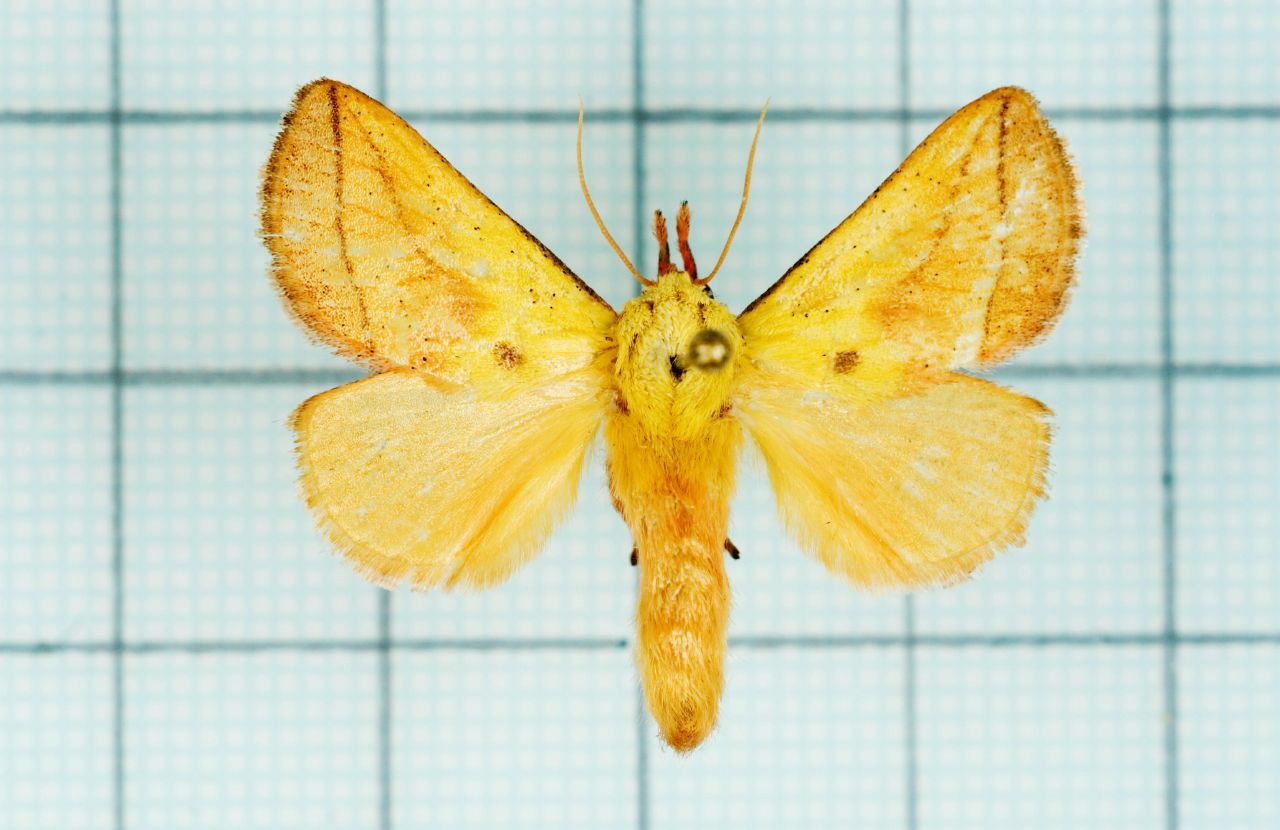

Scientific classification
- Kingdom: Animalia
- Phylum: Arthropoda
- Clade: Pancrustacea
- Class: Insecta
- Order: Lepidoptera
- Family: Limacodidae
- Genus: Monema
- Species: M. flavescens
- Subspecies: M. f. rubriceps

Trinomial name
- Monema flavescens rubriceps (Matsumura, 1931)

Synonyms
- Cnidocampa rubriceps Matsumura, 1931; Monema rubriceps

= Monema flavescens rubriceps =

Subspecies of moth

Monema flavescens rubriceps is a subspecies of moth in the family Limacodidae. It is found in Taiwan.

The wingspan is 26–34 mm. Adults are on wing in May, August and October.
