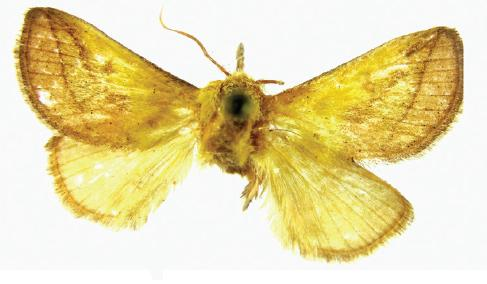
- Male
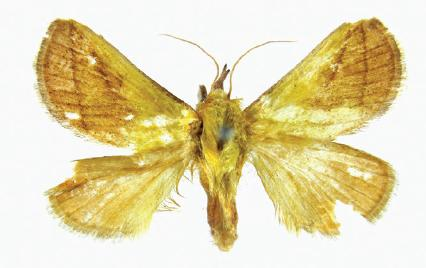
- Female

Scientific classification
- Domain: Eukaryota
- Kingdom: Animalia
- Phylum: Arthropoda
- Class: Insecta
- Order: Lepidoptera
- Family: Limacodidae
- Genus: Monema
- Species: M. tanaognatha

Binomial name
- Monema tanaognatha Wu & Pan, 2013

= Monema tanaognatha =

Species of moth

Monema tanaognatha is a moth of the family Limacodidae. It is found in China (Shaanxi, Gansu, Hubei, Guangxi, Sichuan, Yunnan).

The wingspan is 28–33 mm. The ground colour of the forewings is yellow, with two dark concave fasciae from the apex to one-third and two-thirds of the inner margin. The distal part of the forewings is bordered by brown proximal fascia. The hindwings are yellow to yellowish brown.

== Etymology ==
The species name is derived from Greek Tanaos (meaning long) and gnathos (meaning jaw) and refers to the long gnathos in the male genitalia.
