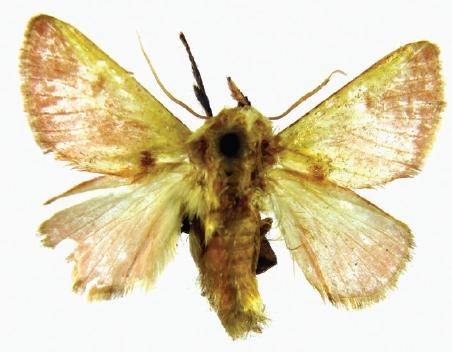
- Male

Scientific classification
- Domain: Eukaryota
- Kingdom: Animalia
- Phylum: Arthropoda
- Class: Insecta
- Order: Lepidoptera
- Family: Limacodidae
- Genus: Monema
- Species: M. coralina

Binomial name
- Monema coralina Dudgeon, 1895

= Monema coralina =

Species of moth

Monema coralina is a moth of the family Limacodidae. It is found in China (Yunnan, Xizang), Nepal and Bhutan.

The wingspan is 30–35 mm. The wings are reddish.
