= List of Bakuage Sentai Boonboomger characters =

Bakuage Sentai Boonboomger (爆上戦隊ブンブンジャー, Bakuage Sentai Bunbunjā) is a Japanese tokusatsu series that serves as the 48th installment in the Super Sentai franchise produced by TV Asahi and the fifth entry in the Reiwa era.

== Main characters ==
=== Boonboomgers ===
The main heroes of Bakuage Sentai Boonboomger. From left to right: Genba Bureki, Ishiro Meita, Taiya Hando, Sakito Homura, Mira Shifuto, and Jyo Akuse.

The primary members of the eponymous Boonboomgers composed of Taiya, Ishiro, and Mira each carry a speedometer-like Boonboom Changer (ブンブンチェンジャー, Bunbun Chenjā), which is usually attached to their bracelet, as their transformation device along with a Boonboom Handle (ブンブンハンドル, Bunbun Handoru), which can be reconfigured into varying forms, such as Handle Mode (ハンドルモード, Handoru Mōdo), as their sidearm.

The secondary members composed of Jyo and Genba each carry a variant of the Boonboom Changer called the Boonboom Booster (ブンブンブースター, Bunbun Būsutā) as their transformation device along with a Boonboom Change Axe (ブンブンチェンジアックス, Bunbun Chenji Akkusu), which like the Boonboom Handle can be reconfigured into varying forms, such as Handle Mode, as their sidearm. Similarly to the Boonboom Changer, the Boonboom Booster is usually attached to the Boonboom Change Axe.

After the arrival of the team's sixth member, it is revealed that Boomboomger was originally the name of Bundorio and Byun's team from when they used to compete together in an intergalactic race called the Big Bang Grand Prix (ビッグバングランプリ, Biggu Ban Guran Puri), abbreviated as BBG.

The Boonboomgers later acquire the gear stick-like Champion Changer (チャンピオンチェンジャー, Chanpion Chenjā) device, which allows the primary and secondary members to become the Champion Boonboomgers (チャンピオンブンブンジャー, Chanpion Bunbunjā). While transformed, they wear Champion Jackets (チャンピオンジャケット, Chanpion Jaketto), which grant the use of varying Customize (カスタマイズ, Kasutamaizu) abilities based on the Boonboom Cars. If necessary, Sakito can borrow a Champion Jacket from one of his teammates to assume his own Champion Boonboomger form.

==== Taiya Hando ====
Taiya Hando (範道 大也, Handō Taiya), code-named the Courier (届け屋, Todokeya), is a secretly wealthy car lover who works as a deliverer and developed the Boonboomger arsenal. He originally formed the Boonboomgers as a racing team to fulfill his dream of competing in the BBG. After Spindo's death, he travels through the universe with the other four Boonboomgers and Bundorio to save planets suffering from Hashiriyan remnants before competing in the BBG.

Taiya can transform into Bun Red (ブンレッド, Bun Reddo). While transformed, he primarily wields the Boonboom Handle in Rod Mode (ロッドモード, Roddo Mōdo). He also rides the Boonboom Supercar (ブンブンスーパーカー, Bunbun Sūpākā). During the events of the V-Cinema Bakuage Sentai Boonboomger vs. King-Ohger, his Boonboom Changer evolves into the King Boonboom Changer (キングブンブンチェンジャー, Kingu Bunbun Chenjā), which grants the ability to initiate combinations of the Boonboom Cars and the Shugods.

Later in the series, Taiya acquires the fire extinguisher-like Zoonzoom Shoka Blaster (ズンズンショウカブラスター, Zunzun Shōka Burasutā) firearm, which allows him to transform into the armored Bun Red 119 (ブンレッド119(ワンワンナイン), Bun Reddo Wan Wan Nain), based on a firefighter's uniform and inspired by his childhood dream. While transformed, he is equipped with the twin shoulder-mounted hydrokinetic Hose Impact (ホースインパクト, Hōsu Inpakuto) nozzles.

Taiya Hando is portrayed by Haruhi Iuchi (井内 悠陽, Iuchi Haruhi). As a child, Taiya is portrayed by Miyabi Hori (堀 雅陽, Hori Miyabi).

==== Ishiro Meita ====
Ishiro Meita (鳴田 射士郎, Meita Ishirō), code-named the Informer (情報屋, Jōhōya) and nicknamed "Chashiro" (シャーシロ, Shāshiro), is a freelance spy and Taiya's informant.

Ishiro can transform into Bun Blue (ブンブルー, Bun Burū). While transformed, he primarily wields the Boonboom Handle in Gun Mode (ガンモード, Gan Mōdo).

Ishiro Meita is portrayed by Yuki Hayama (葉山 侑樹, Hayama Yūki).

==== Mira Shifuto ====
Mira Shifuto (志布戸 未来, Shifuto Mira), code-named the Motorist (運転屋, Unten'ya), is a part-time worker who works various jobs and is also skilled with any vehicle. She originally was forced into an unwanted marriage, but was rescued during the wedding ceremony by Taiya who was hired by her boyfriend. However, instead of running away with her boyfriend, she decides to join the Boonboomgers when Taiya convinced her to not let others take control of her life. After Spindo's death, she temporarily becomes the owner of the BBG and removes Hashiriyans' influence from the racing event.

Mira can transform into Bun Pink (ブンピンク, Bun Pinku). While transformed, she can use the Boonboom Handle as either a club in Rod Mode upside down or a sonic weapon in Handle Mode.

Mira Shifuto is portrayed by Miu Suzuki (鈴木 美羽, Suzuki Miu). As a child, Mira is portrayed by Riina Ōba (大葉 りいな, Ōba Riina).

==== Jyo Akuse ====
Jyo Akuse (阿久瀬 錠, Akuse Jō), code-named the Police Officer (警察屋, Keisatsuya), is a policeman who acts as liaison with the ISA. Near the end of the series, he cuts ties with the police.

Jyo can transform into Bun Black (ブンブラック, Bun Burakku). While transformed, he primarily wields the Boonboom Change Axe in Rod Mode.

Jyo Akuse is portrayed by Ryu Saito (齋藤 璃佑, Saitō Ryū). As a child, Jyo is portrayed by Sora Shiota (塩田 宙, Shiota Sora).

==== Genba Bureki ====
Genba Bureki (振騎 玄蕃, Bureki Genba), real name Genbard De Livery II (ゲンバード・デ・リバリー二世, Genbādo De Ribarī Ni-sei) and code-named the Procurer (調達屋, Chōtatsuya), is Taiya's supplier and a humanoid alien from Planet Bureki (惑星ブレキ, Wakusei Bureki). He is able to procure anything that anyone needs and uses his skills to support the team from the sidelines before officially joining as a Boonboomger. His predilection for sweets, particularly lollipops, is later revealed to be because he requires a constant intake of sugar to maintain his human disguise. He temporarily leaves the team in the hopes of personally defeating his archenemy Disrace, who enslaved his planet for the Hashiriyans, but later rejoins them after seeing their resolve. As of the stage play Bakuage Sentai Boonboomger: Final Live, his planet has been liberated from the Hashiriyans and he has become a major sponsor of his racing team.

Genba can transform into Bun Orange (ブンオレンジ, Bun Orenji). While transformed, he primarily wields the Boonboom Change Axe in Axe Mode (アックスモード, Akkusu Mōdo).

Genba Bureki is portrayed by Satoru Soma (相馬 理, Sōma Satoru).

==== Sakito Homura ====
Sakito Homura (焔 先斗, Homura Sakito), code-named the Settler (始末屋, Shimatsuya), is a man who travels through the universe with his partner Byun Diesel. After losing his parents at an early age, he met the Settlers including Byun at the age of 10 and left Earth to join them.

Unlike the primary or secondary Boonboomgers, Sakito utilizes the Boonboom Controller (ブンブンコントローラー, Bunbun Kontorōrā) sidearm, which can switch between Controller Mode (コントローラーモード, Kontorōrā Mōdo) and Bowgun Mode (ボウガンモード, Bōgan Mōdo), to transform into Bun Violet (ブンバイオレット, Bun Baioretto). While transformed, he primarily wields the Boonboom Controller in Bowgun Mode. As of the stage show Bakuage Sentai Boonboomger: Final Live, he is given his own Champion Jacket.

Sakito Homura is portrayed by Yu Miyazawa (宮澤 佑, Miyazawa Yū). As a child, Sakito is portrayed by Ryōta Toba (鳥羽 涼太, Toba Ryōta).

=== Boonboom Cars ===
The Boonboom Cars (ブンブンカー, Bunbun Kā) are the Boonboomgers' mecha that requires using their sidearms in Handle Mode, or Controller Mode in the case of Bun Violet, to pilot them. With the exception of Boonboom Trailer, Off Road Ghost, Leo Rescue, Byunbyum Mach, and the Champion Carrier, each Boonboom Car has an Attack Mode (アタックモード, Atakku Mōdo) that when activated deploys a unique Bakuage (バクアゲ) weapon.

- Boonboom Off Road (ブンブンオフロード, Bunbun Ofu Rōdo): Bun Blue's personal off-road vehicle-themed Boonboom Car whose Attack Mode deploys the Bakuage Driver (バクアゲドライバー, Bakuage Doraibā).
  - Boonboom Off Road Ghost (ブンブンオフロードゴースト, Bunbun Ofu Rōdo Gōsuto): A yellow-colored copy of Boonboom Off Road.
- Boonboom Wagon (ブンブンワゴン, Bunbun Wagon): Bun Pink's personal station wagon-themed Boonboom Car whose Attack Mode deploys the Bakuage Hand (バクアゲハンド, Bakuage Hando) grapple.
- Boonboom Patrol Car 1 (ブンブンパトカー1, Bunbun Patokā Wan): Bun Black's personal police car-themed Boonboom Car whose Attack Mode deploys the Bakuage Spike (バクアゲスパイク, Bakuage Supaiku) clamp.
- Boonboom Patrol Car 2 (ブンブンパトカー2, Bunbun Patokā Tsū): Bun Black's secondary police van-themed Boonboom Car whose Attack Mode deploys the twin Bakuage Magnum (バクアゲマグナム, Bakuage Magunamu) handguns.
- Boonboom Shovel (ブンブンショベル, Bunbun Shoberu): Bun Orange's personal excavator-themed Boonboom Car whose Attack Mode deploys the Bakuage Missile (バクアゲミサイル, Bakuage Misairu) turret.
- Boonboom Dozer (ブンブンドーザー, Bunbun Dōzā): Bun Orange's secondary bulldozer-themed Boonboom Car whose Attack Mode deploys the Bakuage Hammer (バクアゲハンマー, Bakuage Hanmā).
- Boonboom Classic (ブンブンクラシック, Bunbun Kurashikku): A classic car-themed Boonboom Car whose Attack Mode deploys the Bakuage Sword (バクアゲソード, Bakuage Sōdo).
- Boonboom Racing (ブンブンレーシング, Bunbun Rēshingu): A sports car-themed Boonboom Car whose Attack Mode deploys the Bakuage Burner (バクアゲバーナー, Bakuage Bānā) splitter.
- Boonboom Safari (ブンブンサファリ, Bunbun Safari): A game viewer vehicle-themed Boonboom Car equipped with an artificial intelligence inspired by Engine Speedor whose Attack Mode deploys the twin Bakuage Claws (バクアゲクロー, Bakuage Kurō).
- Boonboom Marine (ブンブンマリン, Bunbun Marin): A mobile billboard/aquarium-themed Boonboom Car equipped with an artificial intelligence inspired by Engine Speedor whose Attack Mode deploys the Bakuage Wild (バクアゲワイルド, Bakuage Wairudo) jaws.
- Boonboom Leo Rescue (ブンブンレオレスキュー, Bunbun Reo Resukyū): Bun Red 119's personal fire engine-themed Boonboom Car that can use the Bakuage Ladder (バクアゲラダー, Bakuage Radā) turntable ladder/water cannon hybrid to activate the other Boonboom Cars' Attack Mode. It can also transform into the lion-themed Boonboom Leon (ブンブンレオン, Bunbun Reon), which is equipped with an artificial intelligence inspired by Engine Speedor and possesses an armored form that is accessed by combining with Boonboom Off Road, Patrol Car 2, Dozer, and Classic.
  - Boonboom Shobosha (ブンブン消防車, Bunbun Shōbōsha): A smaller fire engine-themed support Boonboom Car stored in the Boonboom Leo Rescue whose Attack Mode deploys a water cannon.
- Champion Carrier (チャンピオンキャリアー, Chanpion Kyariā): A car carrier trailer-themed Boonboom Car inspired by the Ressha that can combine with its four Boonboom Carriers (ブンブンキャリアー, Bunbun Kyariā) to assume Heavy Armament Mode (重武装モード, Jū Busō Mōdo).
- Boonboom SuisoCar (ブンブン水素カー, Bunbun Suisokā): A hydrogen car-themed Boonboom Car whose Attack Mode deploys the twin Bakuage Jet (バクアゲジェット, Bakuage Jetto) boosters.

==== Bundorio Bunderas ====
Bundorio Bunderas (ブンドリオ・ブンデラス, Bundorio Bunderasu), nicknamed "Bunbun" (ブンブン), is an alien machine life form who was a BBG racer before his license was revoked for using illegal parts unbeknownst to him, which provoked an accident. During his disappearance following the revocation of his license, Bundorio was scouted to work for Waruido Spindo and developed several items for him, including the Ignition Keys, before leaving the Hashiriyan after knowing Spindo's true colors and cooperating with the police for his arrest while faking his death to escape from Spindo's fury. Bundorio ended up on Earth where he befriended Taiya, and the two developed the Boonboomger arsenal with the purpose of enabling Bundorio to return to the BBG as Taiya's mechanic, only to use it primarily to fend off the Hashiriyans' invasion of Earth. After Spindo's death, his reputation in the BBG is restored thanks to Mira.

Bundorio can enlarge and transform into Bun Red's personal semi-trailer truck-themed Boonboom Car; Boonboom Trailer (ブンブントレーラー, Bunbun Torērā). In this form, he gains the ability to assume Gate Mode (ゲートモード, Gēto Mōdo) where he uses the Iron Lane (アイアンレーン, Aian Rēn) to activate the other Boonboom Cars' Attack Mode. He can also assume a humanoid form and combine with two other Boonboom Cars to form varying giant robots via Bakuage Combination (バクアゲ合体, Bakuage Gattai).

- Boonboomger Robo (ブンブンジャーロボ, Bunbunjā Robo): The Boonboomgers' first giant robot composed of Boonboom Trailer, Off-Road, and Wagon.
  - Boonboomger Robo Nitouryu (ブンブンジャーロボ 二刀流, Bunbunjā Robo Nitōryū; Boonboomger Robo Two Sword Style): A combination of Boonboomger Robo and Boonboom Classic.
  - Boonboomger Robo Patrol Car 1 & Racing Custom (ブンブンジャーロボ パトカー1&レーシングカスタム, Bunbunjā Robo Patokā Wan Ando Rēshingu Kasutamu): A variation of Boonboomger Robo that replaces Boonboom Off Road and Wagon with Boonboom Patrol Car 1 and Racing.
  - Boonboomger Robo Puncher (ブンブンジャーロボパンチャー, Bunbunjā Robo Panchā): A variation of Boonboomger Robo that replaces Boonboom Wagon with Boonboom Off Road Ghost.
  - Boonboomger Robo Shovel & Patrol Car 2 Custom (ブンブンジャーロボ ショベル&パトカー2カスタム, Bunbunjā Robo Shoberu Ando Patokā Tsū Kasutamu): A variation of Boonboomger Robo that replaces Boonboom Off Road and Wagon with Boonboom Shovel and Patrol Car 2.
  - Boonboomger Robo Safari Custom (ブンブンジャーロボ サファリカスタム, Bunbunjā Robo Safari Kasutamu): A variation of Boonboomger Robo that replaces Boonboom Off Road and Wagon with Boonboom Safari.
  - Wing Boonboomger Robo (ウイングブンブンジャーロボ, Uingu Bunbunjā Robo): A combination of Boonboomger Robo and Byunbyum Mach Robo that grants the use of the latter's Mach Wings and Bakuage Charger.
    - Wing Boonboomger Robo Marine & Off Road Custom (ウイングブンブンジャーロボ マリン&オフロードカスタム, Uingu Bunbunjā Robo Marin Ando Ofu Rōdo Kasutamu): A variation of Wing Boonboomger Robo that replaces Boonboom Wagon with Boonboom Marine.
  - Boonboomger Robo Champion (ブンブンジャーロボチャンピオン, Bunbunjā Robo Chanpion): The Yusho Bakuage Combination (優勝バクアゲ合体, Yūshō Bakuage Gattai) of Boonboomger Robo and the Champion Carrier.
    - Boonboomger Robo Champion Leo Rescue Custom (ブンブンジャーロボチャンピオン レオレスキューカスタム, Bunbunjā Robo Chanpion Reo Resukyū Kasutamu): A variation of Boonboomger Robo Champion that replaces Boonboom Off Road and Wagon with Boonboom Leo Rescue.
- Boonboomger Robo Police (ブンブンジャーロボポリス, Bunbunjā Robo Porisu): The Boonboomgers' second giant robot composed of Boonboom Trailer, Patrol Car 1, and Patrol Car 2.
- Boonboomger Robo Builder (ブンブンジャーロボビルダー, Bunbunjā Robo Birudā): The Boonboomgers' third giant robot composed of Boonboom Trailer, Shovel, and Dozer.
  - Boonboomger Robo Builder Wagon Custom (ブンブンジャーロボビルダー ワゴンカスタム, Bunbunjā Robo Birudā Wagon Kasutamu): A combination of Boonboomger Robo Builder and Boonboom Wagon.
- Boonboomger Robo Knight (ブンブンジャーロボナイト, Bunbunjā Robo Naito): The Boonboomgers' fourth giant robot composed of Boonboom Trailer, Racing, and Classic.
- Boonboomger Robo Monster (ブンブンジャーロボモンスター, Bunbunjā Robo Monsutā): The Boonboomgers' fifth giant robot composed of Boonboom Trailer, Marine, and Safari.
  - Wing Boonboomger Robo Monster (ウイングブンブンジャーロボモンスター, Uingu Bunbunjā Robo Monsutā): A combination of Boonboomger Robo Monster and Byunbyum Mach Robo that grants the use of the latter's Mach Wings.
- Boonboomger Robo 119 (ブンブンジャーロボ119(ワンワンナイン), Bunbunjā Robo Wan Wan Nain): The Super Bakuage Combination (超バクアゲ合体, Chō Bakuage Gattai) of Boonboom Trailer, Leo Rescue, and Shobosha.
- Boonboom Full Throttle Edition (ブンブンフルスロットルエディション, Bunbun Furu Surottoru Edishon): A formation in which Boonboomger Robo 119 is equipped with Boonboom Off Road, Wagon, Patrol Car 1, Patrol Car 2, Shovel, Dozer, Racing, Classic, Marine, and Safari while being supported by Byunbyum Mach Robo.
- Bakuage Merry Christmas Edition (バクアゲメリークリスマスエディション, Bakuage Merī Kurisumasu Edishon): A formation in which Boonboom Trailer rides the Champion Carrier being pulled by Boonboom Leon.
- King Boonboomger Robo (キングブンブンジャーロボ, Kingu Bunbunjā Robo): A combination of Boonboom Trailer, Boonboom Racing, and Gods Tombo, Papillon, and Ant. This combination appears exclusively in the V-Cinema Bakuage Sentai Boonboomger vs. King-Ohger.

Bundorio Bunderas is voiced by Rica Matsumoto (松本 梨香, Matsumoto Rika).

==== Byun Diesel ====
Byun Diesel (ビュン・ディーゼル, Byun Dīzeru), nicknamed "Byundy" (ビュンディー, Byundī), is an alien machine life form, the same race as Bundorio, who is Sakito's partner. Like Bundorio, he is a former BBG racer and a teammate of his. He lost a race with Bundorio just once, which coincidentally was a race to decide the team's name.

Similarly to Bundorio, Byun can enlarge and transform into Bun Violet's personal Formula One car-themed Boonboom Car; Byunbyum Mach (ビュンビュンマッハー, Byunbyun Mahhā). In this form, he gains aerokinesis. He can also assume a humanoid form to become Bun Violet's personal giant robot, Byunbyum Mach Robo (ビュンビュンマッハーロボ, Byunbyun Mahhā Robo), via Bakuage Transformation (バクアゲ変形, Bakuage Henkei) where he gains the use of the jet pack-like Mach Wings (マッハーウイング, Mahhā Uingu) and the Bakuage Charger (バクアゲチャージャー, Bakuage Chājā) crossbow.

- Byunbyum Mach Robo ToQ Custom (ビュンビュンマッハーロボ トッキュウカスタム, Byunbyun Mahhā Robo Tokkyū Kasutamu): A combination of Byunbyum Mach and the Blue, Yellow, Green, and Pink Ressha that wields ToQ-Oh's Fumikiri Ken.
- Byunbyum Mach Robo Go-on Custom (ビュンビュンマッハーロボ ゴーオンカスタム, Byunbyun Mahhā Robo Gōon Kasutamu): A combination of Byunbyum Mach and Engine Speedor that grants the use of the latter's abilities.
- Byunbyum Mach Robo Gokai Custom (ビュンビュンマッハーロボ ゴーカイカスタム, Byunbyun Mahhā Robo Gōkai Kasutamu): A combination of Byunbyum Mach and the Gokai Machines that wields GokaiOh's Gokai Ken and Gokai Hō.
- Byunbyum Mach Robo Wagon & Patrol Car 2 Custom (ビュンビュンマッハーロボ ワゴン&パトカー2カスタム, Byunbyun Mahhā Robo Wagon Ando Patokā Tsū Kasutamu): A combination of Byunbyum Mach and Boonboom Wagon and Patrol Car 2. This combination appears exclusively in the V-Cinema Bakuage Sentai Boonboomger vs. King-Ohger.
- King Byunbyum Mach Robo (キングビュンビュンマッハーロボ, Kingu Byunbyun Mahhā Robo): A combination of Byunbyum Mach and Gods Tentou, Kabuto, and Scorpion. This combination appears exclusively in the V-Cinema Bakuage Sentai Boonboomger vs. King-Ohger.

Byun Diesel is voiced by Natsuki Hanae (花江 夏樹, Hanae Natsuki).

== Recurring characters ==
=== Hashiriyan ===
The Hashiriyans. Clockwise from the left, Yaiyai Yarucar, Waruido Spindo, Grantu Risk, Itasha, and Decotrade.

The Great Space Invasion Running Team Hashiriyan (大宇宙侵略大走力団ハシリヤン, Dai Uchū Shinryaku Dai Sōryokudan Hashiriyan) is a mafia of aliens who have conquered planets across the universe and invade Earth to gather humans' screams as an energy source known as Gyasoline (ギャーソリン, Gyāsorin), which they use to get stronger and even enlarge themselves.

==== Waruido Spindo ====
Waruido Spindo (ワルイド・スピンドー, Waruido Supindō) is the main leader and founder of Hashiriyan who orchestrated Bundorio's expulsion from the BBG in order to lure him into the organization, using his inventions to conquer other planets unbeknownst to him. Spindo was arrested by the Great Galactic Police (大銀河警察, Dai Ginga Keisatsu) thanks to Bundorio's info when he learned the truth. Despite being behind bars, Spindo still commands the organization from a luxurious cell within a prison asteroid that he transforms into his base of operations thanks to his connections with the Great Galactic Police and becomes obsessed with getting his revenge on Bundorio for his imprisonment upon knowing that he is still alive. Spindo has a pet monkey named Shaishai Sarucar (シャイシャイ・サルカー, Shaishai Sarukā) that acts as a portable supply of Gyasoline that makes him almost invincible, until it is destroyed by Boonboom Marine. He later gains a powered-up form by absorbing Gyasoline from Bundorio. He is defeated by Bun Red and Bundorio, and perishes after happily refusing Bundorio's offer to surrender and redeem himself for his crimes.

Waruido Spindo is voiced by Koji Yusa (遊佐 浩二, Yusa Kōji), who also voices Shaishai Sarucar.

==== Grantu Risk ====
Grantu Risk (グランツ・リスク, Gurantsu Risuku) is the second-in-command of Hashiriyan and Waruido Spindo's right-hand man. He has a bull named Lambor (ランボー, Ranbō) attached to his left shoulder. He is destroyed by Champion Bun Blue.

Grantu Risk is voiced by Tsutomu Isobe (磯部 勉, Isobe Tsutomu).

==== Sanseaters ====
The Sanseaters (サンシーター, Sanshītā) are a trio of low-ranking Hashiriyans who are the first to arrive on Earth. Having failed to defeat the Boonboomgers by themselves, they begin working under the team captains in order to accomplish their original goal of taking over the planet. At the height of Hashiriyan's complete takeover on Earth, the Sanseaters abandoned their positions out of their growing disgust for the leading members' backstabbing tendencies and their bonding with the Boonboomgers as fellow fugitives. After Spindo's death, the Sanseaters leave the Earth on good terms with the Boonboomgers, aiming to start their own empire. While on the planet Chikyu, they work under Yanma Gast.

- Decotrade (デコトラーデ, Dekotorāde): A dekotora-themed leader of the Sanseaters who also serves as the pilot of Boonboom Killer Robo. In combat, he wields a microphone-themed staff known as the Zekkyo Dai Mic (ゼッキョー大マイク, Zekkyō Dai Maiku) that he can also use as makeshift club. Voiced by Junichi Suwabe (諏訪部 順一, Suwabe Jun'ichi).
- Itasha (イターシャ, Itāsha): An itasha-themed member of the Sanseaters who was a pickpocket. She is tasked with creating the Kurumaju and operating the Boonboom Danger in Boonboom Killer Robo. Voiced by Nana Mizuki (水樹 奈々, Mizuki Nana).
- Yaiyai Yarucar (ヤイヤイ・ヤルカー, Yaiyai Yarukā): A six-wheel sports car-themed member of the Sanseaters who resembles a small car and absorbs the Gyasoline accumulated by the Kurumaju once it is destroyed, which he can use to revive and enlarge them. His ability to revive and enlarge the Kurumaju is later enhanced by Cannonborg. He is turned into Kurumaju Gurumar (クルマジュウグルマー, Kurumajū Gurumā) by Grantu before being defeated by the secondary Champion Boonboomgers, reverting him back to normal. As Kurumaju Gurumar, Yaiyai gained the use of varying Gyastomize (ギャースタマイズ, Gyāsutamaizu) abilities based on previous Kurumaju, similar to the Champion Boonboomgers' Customizes. Voiced by Sumire Morohoshi (諸星 すみれ, Morohoshi Sumire).

==== Captains ====
- Madrex (マッドレックス, Maddorekkusu): A raid captain of Hashiriyan whom the Sanseaters originally answer to. He has a pet dog named Hashiriken (ハシリ犬) attached to his left thigh and wields the drill-like Fury Death Rod (怒りのデスロッド, Ikari no Desu Roddo) spear. He is defeated by the Boonboomgers before being destroyed by Boonboomger Robo Knight. He is later revived as Disrace's puppet known as Madrex Fury (マッドレックス・フューリー, Maddorekkusu Fyūrī), with Hashiriken attached to his left hand, before being defeated by Champion Bun Red and dying again. Voiced by Hiroshi Kamiya (神谷 浩史, Kamiya Hiroshi), who also voices Hashiriken.
- Cannonborg (キャノンボーグ, Kyanonbōgu): A modification captain of Hashiriyan who carries the candlestick-like Jackie (ジャッキー, Jakkī) device and can upgrade the Kurumaju created by the Sunseaters with extra abilities. He is defeated by Bun Violet before being destroyed by Boonboom Full Throttle Edition. Voiced by Kujira (くじら).
- Disrace (ディスレース, Disurēsu): A rebuild captain of Hashiriyan who carries the tsuchinoko-like Frank (フランク, Furanku) device, which can be used as a meteor hammer. He revives Madrex as his brainwashed pawn. He is defeated by Champion Bun Orange before being destroyed by Boomboomger Robo Champion. He is later revived as Spindo's sacrificial pawn known as Disrace 2000 (ディスレース2000, Disurēsu Nisen) before dying again. Voiced by Showtaro Morikubo (森久保 祥太郎, Morikubo Shōtarō).

==== Other forces ====
- Neziretta (ネジレッタ, Nejiretta): Hashiriyan's screw-themed foot soldiers who wield muffler-themed Muffranbo (マフランボー, Mafuranbō) clubs that also double as rifles.
- Boonboom Killer Robo (ブンブンキラーロボ, Bunbun Kirā Robo): Rust-colored knockoffs of Boonboomger Robo that Cannonborg created to fight against Boonboomger Robo and Byunbyum Mach Robo in place of an enlarged Kurumaju's absence. Specifically for the Sanseaters, they possess a dark copy of the Boonboom Changer called the Boonboom Danger (ブンブンデンジャー, Bunbun Denjā) that allows them to summon the giant robot and hijack the Boonboom Cars for their purposes. Under Raita Naito's orders, the Lightning Tech mass-produces Boonboom Killer Robo in autonomous piloting as preparation for Hashiriyan's invasion on Earth, but most of them are destroyed by Byunbyum Mach Robo. A surviving model is repurposed by the Sanseaters to be their main transportation in their departure from Earth after making peace with the Boonboomgers.
  - Boonboom Killer Trailer (ブンブンキラートレーラー, Bunbun Kirā Torērā): A dark copy of Boonboom Trailer that is capable of firing Killer Missiles (バキラーミサイル, Kirā Misairu).
  - Boonboom Killer Off Road (ブンブンキラーオフロード, Bunbun Kirā Ofurōdo): A dark copy of Boonboom Off-Road that supplies the Killer Drill (キラードリル, Kirā Doriru).
  - Boonboom Killer Wagon (ブンブンキラーワゴン, Bunbun Kirā Wagon): A dark copy of Boonboom Wagon that supplies the Killer Hand (キラーハンド, Kirā Hando) grapple.
- Yarucar Tribe (ヤルカー族, Yarukā-zoku): Yaiyai Yarucar's race of six-wheel sports car-themed creatures native to their namesake planet, one of the many worlds to be conquered by Hashiriyan. In truth, they were brainwashed by the organization to be carriers of Gyasoline, commanded by Grantu Risk via their Tosacar (トサカー, Tosakā) mohawks. At the height of Hashiriyan's invasion on Earth, the first wave of Yarucars arrived to empower Spindo but ended up merging with Kurumaju Gurumar's leftover Gyasoline to form a giant copy of the monster, forcing the Sanseaters to sacrifice a Boonboom Killer Robo to liberate them. The second wave of Yarucars had their passageway to Earth being blocked by Genba's space ship to prevent Spindo from receiving further supply of Gyasoline.
- Weiwei Yarucar (ウェイウェイ・ヤルカー, Weiwei Yarukā): An elite member of both the Yarucar Tribe and the Hashiriyan's chain of command, who is pursued by Engine Speeder after reign of terror in the Machine World. Arriving on Earth, Weiwei tries to recruit Yaiyai into enrolling for Hashiriyan's academy by taking his place in the Sanseaters, only to abandon them out of disappointment for their incompetence. Voiced by Kengo Kawanishi (河西 健吾, Kawanishi Kengo)

==== Kurumaju ====
The Kurumaju (苦魔獣, Kurumajū) are monsters created by infusing an object with an Ignition Key (イグニッションキー, Igunisshon Kī), an invention of Bundorio's when he was part of the organization. Once defeated, they are usually enlarged through Yaiyai Yarucar.

- Wedding Dress Gurumar (ウエディングドレスグルマー, Uedingu Doresu Gurumā): A wedding dress-themed monster. It is defeated by the primary Boonboomgers before being destroyed by Boonboomger Robo. Voiced by Masaharu Satō (佐藤 正治, Satō Masaharu).
- Soujiki Gurumar (ソウジキグルマー, Sōjiki Gurumā): A vacuum cleaner-themed monster. It is defeated by the primary Boonboomgers before being destroyed by Boonboomger Robo. Voiced by Mitsuaki Kanuka (かぬか 光明, Kanuka Mitsuaki).
  - Soujiki Gurumar II (ソウジキグルマー・二台目, Sōjiki Gurumā Ni-daime): A variant of Soujiki Gurumar. It is defeated by Champion Bun Pink before combining with Reizouko Gurumar II to form Reizouko Soujiki Gurumar (レイゾウコソウジキグルマー, Reizōko Sōjiki Gurumā) and being destroyed by Boonboomger Robo Champion.
- Tokei Gurumar (トケイグルマー, Tokei Gurumā): A clock-themed monster. It is defeated by the primary Boonboomgers before being destroyed by Boonboomger Robo. Voiced by Kento Fujinuma (藤沼 建人, Fujinuma Kento).
  - Tokei Gurumar Seconds (トケイグルマー・セカンズ, Tokei Gurumā Sekanzu): A variant of Tokei Gurumar. It is defeated by Bun Red, Blue, Pink, and Black before being destroyed by Boonboomger Robo 119. Voiced by Tetsuya Yanagihara (柳原 哲也, Yanagihara Tetsuya).
- Sauna Gurumar (サウナグルマー, Sauna Gurumā): A sauna-themed monster. It is defeated by the primary Boonboomgers before being destroyed by Boonboomger Robo. Voiced by Toshihide Tsuchiya (土屋 トシヒデ, Tsuchiya Toshihide).
- Darts Gurumar (ダーツグルマー, Dātsu Gurumā): A darts-themed monster. It is defeated by Bun Black before being destroyed by Boonboomger Robo Police. Voiced by Noboru Yamaguchi (山口 登, Yamaguchi Noboru).
- Toilet Gurumar (トイレグルマー, Toire Gurumā): A toilet-themed monster. It is defeated by Bun Blue, Pink, and Black before being destroyed by Boonboomger Robo Police. Voiced by Tetsu Kimishima (君嶋 哲, Kimishima Tetsu).
  - Toilet Gurumar Limited (トイレグルマー・リミテッド, Toire Gurumā Rimiteddo): A variant of Toilet Gurumar. It is defeated by Bun Red 119 and Bun Violet before being destroyed by Boonboom Full Throttle Edition. Voiced by Hiromichi Tezuka (手塚 ヒロミチ, Tezuka Hiromichi).
- Blockbei Gurumar (ブロックベイグルマー, Burokkubei Gurumā): A concrete block wall-themed monster. It is defeated by Bun Orange before being destroyed by Boonboomger Robo Builder. Voiced by Shogo Teramoto (寺本 翔悟, Teramoto Shōgo).
- Koinobori Gurumar (コイノボリグルマー, Koinobori Gurumā): A koinobori-themed monster. It is defeated by the Boonboomgers before being destroyed by Boonboomger Robo Builder Wagon Custom. Voiced by Hiroyuki Muraoka (村岡 弘之, Muraoka Hiroyuki).
- Antenna Gurumar (アンテナグルマー, Antena Gurumā): An antenna-themed monster. It is defeated by the Boonboomgers before being destroyed by Boonboomger Robo Knight. Voiced by Kōsuke Echigoya (越後屋 コースケ, Echigoya Kōsuke).
- Geta Gurumar (ゲタグルマー, Geta Gurumā): An geta-themed monster. It is defeated by the Boonboomgers and Go-on Red before being destroyed by Boonboomger Robo and EngineOh. Voiced by Kenji Nomura (乃村 健次, Nomura Kenji).
- Reizouko Gurumar (レイゾウコグルマー, Reizōko Gurumā): A refrigerator-themed monster. It is destroyed by Bun Blue and Pink. Voiced by Ryōta Asari (浅利 遼太, Asari Ryōta).
  - Reizouko Gurumar II (レイゾウコグルマー・二台目, Reizōko Gurumā Ni-daime): A variant of Reizouko Gurumar. It is defeated by Champion Bun Pink before combining with Soujiki Gurumar II to form Reizouko Soujiki Gurumar and being destroyed by Boonboomger Robo Champion. Voiced by Yasuhiro Takato (高戸 靖広, Takato Yasuhiro).
- Kaseki Gurumar (カセキグルマー, Kaseki Gurumā): A fossil-themed monster, nicknamed "Kiitaro" (キー太郎, Kītarō) by Jyo. It is destroyed by Boonboomger Robo Monster. Voiced by Ryōta Asari (浅利 遼太, Asari Ryōta).
- Sword Gurumar (ソードグルマー, Sōdo Gurumā): A sword-themed monster. It is destroyed by Bun Violet. Voiced by Keikō Sakai (酒井 敬幸, Sakai Keikō).
  - Sword Gurumar Revenge (ソードグルマー・リベンジ, Sōdo Gurumā Ribenji): A variant of Sword Gurumar. It is defeated by Bun Red and Violet before being revived as Boonboom Killer Classic (ブンブンキラークラシック, Bunbun Kirā Kurashikku) and destroyed by Byunbyum Mach Robo.
- Gym Gurumar (ジムグルマー, Jimu Gurumā): A gym-themed monster. It is defeated by Bun Violet before being destroyed by Byunbyum Mach Robo. Voiced by Shō Karino (狩野 翔, Karino Shō).
  - Super Great Gym Gurumar (スーパーグレートジムグルマー, Sūpā Gurēto Jimu Gurumā): A variant of Gym Gurumar. It is defeated by Champion Bun Orange and Bun Violet wearing Jyo's Champion Jacket before being destroyed by Boonboomger Robo 119.
- ATM Gurumar (ATMグルマー, Ē Tī Emu Gurumā): An automated teller machine-themed monster. It is defeated by Bun Blue, Pink, Black, and Orange before being destroyed by Wing Boonboomger Robo. Voiced by Kōki Miyata (宮田 幸季, Miyata Kōki).
- Owan Gurumar (オワングルマー, Owan Gurumā): A bowl-themed monster. It is defeated by Bun Pink and Violet before being destroyed by Boonboomger Robo Builder and Byunbyum Mach Robo. Voiced by Satoshi Tsuruoka (鶴岡 聡, Tsuruoka Satoshi).
- Shoukaki Gurumar (ショウカキグルマー, Shōkaki Gurumā): A fire extinguisher-themed monster. It is defeated by Bun Red 119 before being destroyed by Wing Boonboomger Robo Monster. Voiced by Takaaki Torashima (虎島 貴明, Torashima Takaaki).
- Tent Gurumar (テントグルマー, Tento Gurumā): A tent-themed monster. It is defeated by Bun Red 119 before being destroyed by Boonboom Leon. Voiced by Satoru Itō (いとう さとる, Itō Satoru).
- Glove Gurumar (グローブグルマー, Gurōbu Gurumā): A baseball glove-themed monster. It is defeated by Bun Red 119 before being destroyed by Boonboomger Robo 119. Voiced by Shūichi Uchida (内田 修一, Uchida Shūichi).
- Akogi Gurumar (アコギグルマー, Akogi Gurumā): An acoustic guitar-themed monster. It is defeated by Bun Red 119 before being destroyed by Boonboomger Robo 119. Voiced by Yū Hayashi (林 勇, Hayashi Yū).
  - Big Brother's Akogi Gurumar "Jon" (アニキのアコギグルマー・ジョン, Aniki no Akogi Gurumā Jon): A variant of Akogi Gurumar. It is destroyed by Grantu Risk.
- Carpet Gurumar (カーペットグルマー, Kāpetto Gurumā): A carpet-themed monster. It is defeated by Bun Red 119 before being destroyed by Boonboomger Robo 119. Voiced by Seirō Ogino (荻野 晴朗, Ogino Seirō).
- Neon Gurumar (ネオングルマー, Neon Gurumā): A neon sign-themed monster. It is defeated by Bun Black before being destroyed by Boonboomger Robo Police. Voiced by Kenta Miyake (三宅 健太, Miyake Kenta).
- Gong Gurumar (ゴンググルマー, Gongu Gurumā): A gong-themed monster. It is defeated by Bun Blue and Violet before being destroyed by Wing Boonboomger Robo Marine & Off Road Custom. Voiced by Chihiro Suzuki (鈴木 千尋, Suzuki Chihiro).
- Senro Gurumar (センログルマー, Senro Gurumā): A railway track-themed monster. It is defeated by Bun Red, Bun Violet, and ToQ 1gou before being destroyed by Boonboomger Robo and ToQ-Oh. Voiced by Daisuke Sakaguchi (阪口 大助, Sakaguchi Daisuke).
- Ishiyakiimoki Gurumar (イシヤキイモキグルマー, Ishiyakiimoki Gurumā): A stone-roasted sweet potato machine-themed monster. It is destroyed by Bun Violet. Voiced by Yukimasa Ono (尾野 透雅, Ono Yukimasa).
- Renga Blockbei Gurumar (レンガブロックベイグルマー, Renga Burokkubei Gurumā): A brick wall-themed monster. It is destroyed by Bun Violet. Voiced by Shinnosuke Susumago (煤孫 新之助, Susumago Shin'nosuke).
- Eleki Guitar Gurumar (エレキギターグルマー, Ereki Gitā Gurumā): An electric guitar-themed monster. It is destroyed by the Champion Carrier. Voiced by Yukihiro Nozuyama (野津山 幸宏, Nozuyama Yukihiro).
  - Cousin's Eleki Gurumar "Bovi" (イトコのエレキグルマー・ボヴィ, Itoko no Ereki Gurumā Bovi): A variant of Eleki Guitar Gurumar. It is destroyed by Grantu Risk.
- Camera Gurumar (カメラグルマー, Kamera Gurumā): A camera-themed monster. It is defeated by Champion Bun Blue before being destroyed by Boonboomger Robo Champion. Voiced by Akihiro Hosokawa (細川 晃弘, Hosokawa Akihiro).
- Sponge Gurumar (スポンジグルマー, Suponji Gurumā): A sponge-themed monster. It is defeated by Champion Bun Red before being destroyed by Boonboomger Robo Champion Leo Rescue Custom. Voiced by Atsushi Abe (阿部 敦, Abe Atsushi).
- Taijukei Gurumar (タイジュウケイグルマー, Taijūkei Gurumā): A weighing scale-themed monster. It is defeated by Champion Bun Black before being destroyed by Boonboomger Robo Champion. Voiced by Shogo Teramoto (寺本 翔悟, Teramoto Shōgo).
- Soccer Ball Gurumar (サッカーボールグルマー, Sakkā Bōru Gurumā): A soccer ball-themed monster. It is destroyed by Boonboomger Robo 119. Voiced by Atsushi Imaruoka (伊丸岡 篤, Imaruoka Atsushi).
- Gomibako Gurumar (ゴミバコグルマー, Gomibako Gurumā): A waste container-themed monster. It is defeated by Champion Bun Red and Itasha before being destroyed by Bakuage Merry Christmas Edition. Voiced by Taiki Yamashita (山下 タイキ, Yamashita Taiki).
- Takarabako Gurumar (タカラバコグルマー, Takarabako Gurumā): A treasure chest-themed monster. It is defeated by Bun Red, Bun Pink, Bun Black, Bun Orange, and Gokai Blue before being destroyed by Boonboomger Robo and Byunbyum Mach Robo Gokai Custom. Voiced by Hirofumi Nojima (野島 裕史, Nojima Hirofumi).

===== Other Kurumaju =====
- Used Kurumaju Army (ユーズド苦魔獣軍団, Yūzudo Kurumajū Gundan): Recreated versions of Wedding Dress, Soujiki, Tokei, Sauna, Dart, Toilet, Koinobori, Antenna, Geta, and Reizouko Gurumars. After Wedding Dress, Dart, Sauna, Koinobori, and Geta Gurumars are destroyed by Bun Red, Blue, Pink, Black, and Orange respectively, the remaining Kurumaju are destroyed by the Boonboomgers. These Kurumaju appear exclusively in the film Bakuage Sentai Boonboomger GekijōBoon! Promise the Circuit.
- Circuit Gurumar (サーキットグルマー, Sākitto Gurumā): A race track-themed monster. It is destroyed by Bun Blue, Pink, Black, and Orange. This Kurumaju appears exclusively in the film Bakuage Sentai Boonboomger GekijōBoon! Promise the Circuit. Voiced by Tomokazu Seki (関 智一, Seki Tomokazu).
- Shakotan Gurumar (シャコタングルマー, Shakotan Gurumā): A stanced car-themed monster and vice raid captain of Hashiriyan. It is destroyed by Champion Bun Red. This Kurumaju appears exclusively in the stage play Bakuage Sentai Boonboomger: Final Live. Voiced by Shigeru Chiba (千葉 繁, Chiba Shigeru).
- Manhole Gurumar (マンホールグルマー, Manhōru Gurumā): A manhole-themed monster created on Planet Kankyo (惑星カンキョ, Wakusei Kankyo). To awaken Dagded Dujardin's clone body, Manhole Gurumar unseals Minongan Mouz and collects the three Sacred Regalia (聖なるレガリア, Sei naru Regaria) which consist of the Ohger Calibur Zero, Nicola's pendant, and the Star Soul Mirror (星魂鏡, Seikon Kagami) that has been in Bundorio's body since his revival. Manhole Gurumar becomes the black hole-themed Great Galactinsect Kurumaju Black Hole Gurumar (大宇蟲大苦魔獣ブラックホールグルマー, Dai Uchū Dai Kurumajū Burakku Hōru Gurumā) by absorbing Dagded's clone body, only to be destroyed by King Boonboomger Robo and King Byunbyum Mach Robo. This Kurumaju appears exclusively in the V-Cinema Bakuage Sentai Boonboomger vs. King-Ohger. Voiced by Tetsu Inada (稲田 徹, Inada Tetsu).
- Ohger Calibur Zero Gurumar (オージャカリバーZEROグルマー, Ōja Karibā Zero Gurumā): A sword-themed monster. It is destroyed by Champion Bun Red and King Kuwagata Ohger. This Kurumaju appears exclusively in the V-Cinema Bakuage Sentai Boonboomger vs. King-Ohger. Voiced by Kishō Taniyama (谷山 紀章, Taniyama Kishō).
- Galaxy Circuit Gurumar (ギャラクシーサーキットグルマー, Gyarakushī Sākitto Gurumā): A race track-themed monster. It is absorbed by Universe No One. This Kurumaju appears exclusively in the V-Cinema No.1 Sentai Gozyuger vs. Boonboomger. Voiced by Tomokazu Seki.

=== Shirabe Saibu ===
Shirabe Saibu (細武 調, Saibu Shirabe) is a special agent of the International Space Agency (国際宇宙対策機構, Kokusai Uchū Taisaku Kikō), who strikes a deal with the Boonboomgers to allow them to keep operating in order to protect Earth from the Hashiriyans. She also has a great admiration for Bundorio and always wants to get closer to him. After Spindo's death, she is picked as Tokoyari's replacement.

Shirabe Saibu is portrayed by Hashiyasume Atsuko (ハシヤスメ・アツコ).

== Guest characters ==
- Raita Naito (内藤 雷汰, Naitō Raita): The CEO of Lightning Tech who was Taiya's mentor prior to the youth's active work as a Boonboomger. He has a nephew named Senji Naito (内藤 千二, Naitō Senji). Despite his current position in his company, Naito is bribed alongside Tokoyari into secretly collaborating with the Hashiriyans to conquer Earth. At the height of Spindo's arrival, Naito sabotages the Boonboom Cars and repossess Taiya's assets in an effort to cripple the team, but is eventually arrested by the authorities after his collaboration with Hashiriyans were made public. Portrayed by Katsuhiko Nagato (長戸 勝彦, Nagato Katsuhiko).
- Eiichiro Tokoyari (常槍 鋭一郎, Tokoyari Eiichirō): A corrupt Division Director of the ISA whom Shirabe answers to. After being bribed into collaborating with the Hashiriyans alongside Naito, Tokoyari frames the Boonboomgers as public enemies and issuing their arrests in spite of civilian casualties taking place during the group's invasion on Earth. Following Spindo's defeat, Tokoyari tries to flee, but is eventually arrested by authorities after his collaboration with Hashiriyans were made public. Portrayed by Keisuke Horibe (堀部 圭亮, Horibe Keisuke).
- Maimi Baisu (梅栖 舞美, Baisu Maimi): A fellow ISA special agent of Shirabe's who is playing along in Tokoyari's plans, in order to give Shirabe the incriminating evidence to bust Tokoyari and Naito. Portrayed by Reika Sakurai (桜井 玲香, Sakurai Reika).
- Nicola Keydoor (ニコーラ・キードアー, Nikōra Kīdoā): A princess of Planet Trickle (惑星トリクル, Wakusei Torikuru), also conquered by the Hashiriyans who first appears in the film Bakuage Sentai Boonboomger GekijōBoon! Promise the Circuit and is saved by the Boonboomgers, who help her escape and return to her home planet to lead the resistance against the invaders. She possesses a magical pendant that later she has Joe Gibken deliver to the Boonboomgers so they can use it to revive Bundorio. After the liberation of Planet Trickle, she becomes the new queen of her home planet before the formation of an alliance between Planet Trickle and the planet Chikyu. Portrayed by Himena Irei (伊礼 姫奈, Irei Himena).

=== Returning characters ===
- Sōsuke Esumi (江角 走輔, Esumi Sōsuke): The leader of the 32nd Super Sentai team, Engine Sentai Go-onger, who can transform into Go-on Red (ゴーオンレッド, Gōon Reddo). Yasuhisa Furuhara (古原 靖久, Furuhara Yasuhisa) reprises his role from Engine Sentai Go-onger.
- Engines (炎神, Enjin): The Go-ongers' sentient mecha.
  - Engine Speedor (炎神スピードル, Enjin Supīdoru): A race car/condor-themed Engine and Go-on Red's partner. Daisuke Namikawa (浪川 大輔, Namikawa Daisuke) reprises his voice role from Engine Sentai Go-onger.
  - Engine Bus-on (炎神バスオン, Enjin Basuon): A bus/lion-themed Engine. Hisao Egawa (江川 央生, Egawa Hisao) reprises his voice role from Engine Sentai Go-onger.
  - Engine BearRV (炎神ベアールV(ブイ), Enjin Beārubui): A four-wheel drive/bear-themed Engine and Speedor's wife. Miki Inoue (井上 美紀, Inoue Miki) reprises her voice role from Engine Sentai Go-onger.
- Ressha Sentai ToQger (烈車戦隊トッキュウジャー, Ressha Sentai Tokkyūjā): The 38th Super Sentai team.
  - Right (ライト, Raito): The leader of the ToQgers who can transform into ToQ 1gou (トッキュウ1号, Tokkyū Ichigō). Jun Shison (志尊 淳, Shison Jun) reprises his role from Ressha Sentai ToQger.
  - Akira Nijino (虹野 明, Nijino Akira): A member of the ToQgers who can transform into ToQ 6gou (トッキュウ6号, Tokkyū Rokugō). Shin Nagahama (長濱 慎, Nagahama Shin) reprises his role from Ressha Sentai ToQger.
- Joe Gibken (ジョー・ギブケン, Jō Gibuken): The second-in-command of the 35th Super Sentai team, Kaizoku Sentai Gokaiger, who can transform into Gokai Blue (ゴーカイブルー, Gōkai Burū). Yuki Yamada (山田 裕貴, Yamada Yūki) reprises his role from Kaizoku Sentai Gokaiger.

== Spin-off characters ==
- Demonthunder (デイモンサンダー, Deimonsandā): A capture captain of Hashiriyan who appears exclusively in the film Bakuage Sentai Boonboomger GekijōBoon! Promise the Circuit. He is destroyed by the Boonboomgers. Voiced by Yūji Kishi (岸 祐二, Kishi Yūji).
- Ajiro (アジロ): An Alien Bureki who plans to infiltrate and outwit the Hashiriyan to gain enormous power over the universe and appears exclusively in the web-exclusive crossover special Bakuage Sentai Boonboomger Formation Lap: Settler of Galaxy. He tries to deliver a legendary sword to the Hashiriyan, only to be thwarted by Sakito and taken to the Great Galactic Police. Portrayed by Dai Goto (後藤 大, Gotō Dai).
- Reikork (レイコーク, Reikōku): A monster that appears exclusively in the web-exclusive crossover special Bakuage Sentai Boonboomger Formation Lap: Settler of Galaxy. It is summoned by Ajiro, only to be destroyed by Ryu Commander, Don Doragoku, Twokaizer, and the Go-on Wings.
