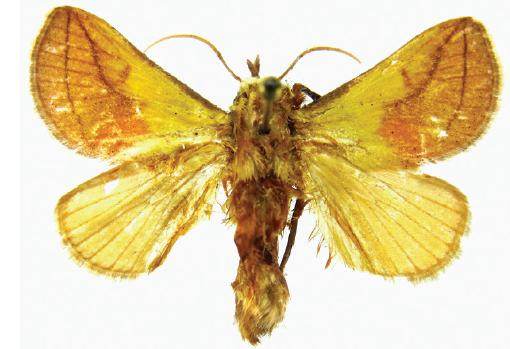
- Male

Scientific classification
- Kingdom: Animalia
- Phylum: Arthropoda
- Clade: Pancrustacea
- Class: Insecta
- Order: Lepidoptera
- Family: Limacodidae
- Genus: Monema
- Species: M. meyi

Binomial name
- Monema meyi Solovyev & Witt, 2009

= Monema meyi =

Species of moth

Monema meyi is a moth of the family Limacodidae. It is found in China (Hubei, Hunan, Fujian, Jiangxi, Guangdong, Hainan, Guangxi, Sichuan, Guizhou, Yunnan) and Vietnam.

The wingspan is 35–38 mm for males and 36–42 mm for females.
