= Monema (moth) =

Scientific classification
- Kingdom: Animalia
- Phylum: Arthropoda
- Class: Insecta
- Order: Lepidoptera
- Family: Limacodidae
- Genus: Monema; Walker, 1855

Synonyms
- Cnidocampa Dyar, 1905

Genus of moths

Monema is a genus of moths of the family Limacodidae.

== Distribution ==
The genus is distributed in Nepal, Bhutan, China, Far East of Russia, Korea, Japan and northern Vietnam.

== Species ==
- Monema coralina Dudgeon, 1895

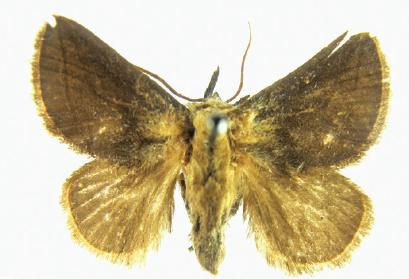
Monema flavescens.

- Monema flavescens Walker, 1855
- Monema meyi Solovyev & Witt, 2009
- Monema tanaognatha Wu & Pan, 2013
