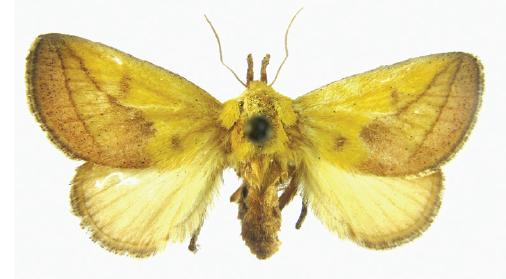
- Monema flavescens flavescens, Female
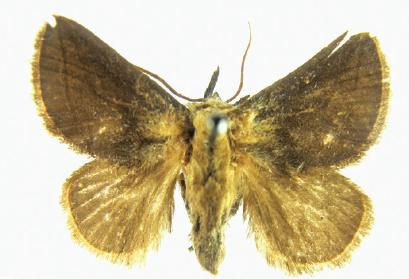
- Monema flavescens flavescens, male, black form

Scientific classification
- Domain: Eukaryota
- Kingdom: Animalia
- Phylum: Arthropoda
- Class: Insecta
- Order: Lepidoptera
- Family: Limacodidae
- Genus: Monema
- Species: M. flavescens

Binomial name
- Monema flavescens Walker, 1855

Synonyms
- Cnidocampa flavescens; Miresa flavescens; Cnidocampa johani-bergmani Bryk, 1948; Cnidocampa johanibergmani; Monema melli Hering, 1931; Monema flavescens var. nigrans de Joannis, 1901; Monema nigrans

= Monema flavescens =

Species of moth

Monema flavescens is a moth of the family Limacodidae. It is found in Japan, Korea, the Russian Far East (Amur, Ussuri, Askold), China (Heilongjiang, Jilin, Liaoning, Inner Mongolia, Beijing, Hebei, Shandong, Henan, Shaanxi, Qinghai, Jiangsu, Shanghai, Zhejiang, Hubei, Jiangxi, Fujian, Guangdong, Guangxi), Taiwan, Philippines and Hyderabad (India), Kerala(India).

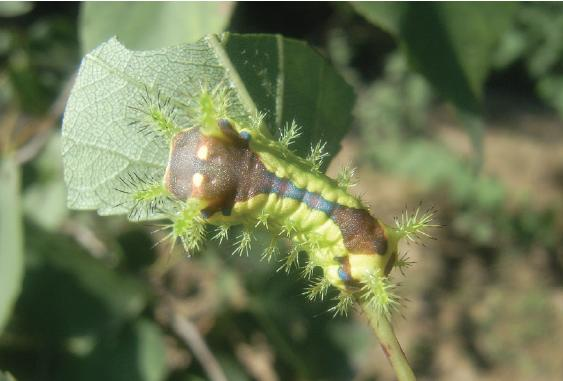
Larva

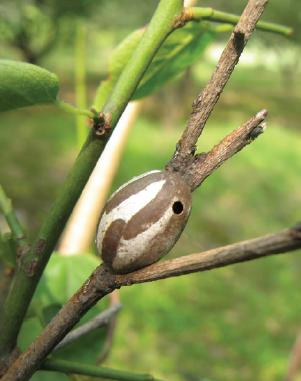
Cocoon

The wingspan is 30–32 mm for males and 35–39 mm for females.

The larvae are polyphagous and are considered a forestry pest.

== Subspecies ==
- Monema flavescens flavescens (China, Russian Far East, Korea, Japan)
- Monema flavescens rubriceps (Matsumura, 1931) (Taiwan)
