= List of Bakuage Sentai Boonboomger episodes =

This is a list of episodes for Bakuage Sentai Boonboomger, a Japanese tokusatsu television drama. It is the fifth series in the franchise released in Japan's Reiwa Era and the 48th entry of Toei's long-running Super Sentai series produced by TV Asahi.

== Episodes ==
No.	Title	Directed by	Written by	Original release date
1	"Courier's Handle"; Transliteration: "Todokeya no Handoru" (Japanese: 届け屋のハンドル)	Shojiro Nakazawa	Atsuhiro Tomioka	March 3, 2024
A delivery man named Taiya Hando suddenly interrupts a wedding at a church, taking the bride, Mira Shifuto, from the church and into his car before driving off with her in the front passenger seat. Before the groom, his father, and his subordinates drive after Taiya in pursuit as it's revealed that Mira was forced into marrying the mob boss's son, can completely catch the two, the Great Space Invasion Running Team Hashiriyan appear. Taiya transforms into Bun Red in front of a bewildered Mira to protect her from the foes who've turned Mira's wedding dress, a precious memento from her grandmother, into a monstrous created called a Kurumaju. Ishiro Meita, an informant working for Taiya, later revealed to be Bun Blue, is sent to retrieve Mira while Taiya deals with the threat, however, in a series of odd events, Mira decides to join Taiya as she becomes Bun Pink. After defeating the Kurumaju, it's revealed by Taiya was sent to retrieve her and bring her to the airport to meet up with her actual boyfriend to leave Tokyo. Mira, thinking over Taiya's words to her to "take the wheel", breaks up with her dismayed boyfriend, declaring she's decided to join the Boonboomgers.
2	"The Informer Does Not Approve"; Transliteration: "Jōhōya wa Mitomenai" (Japanese: 情報屋は認めない)	Shojiro Nakazawa	Atsuhiro Tomioka	March 10, 2024
Ishiro is still wary about Taiya letting Mira join the Boonboomgers, but the three accept a special mission regarding delivering some special documents to an important politician, which is disturbed by another attack from the Hashiriyans.
3	"The Motorist Won't Stop"; Transliteration: "Unten'ya ga Tomaranai" (Japanese: 運転屋が止まらない)	Shojiro Nakazawa	Atsuhiro Tomioka	March 17, 2024
Mira found herself a job to deliver a present from her boy to her grandmother. Taiya refuses to help and Mira is forced to make the delivery by bike, when the Hashiriyans strike again.
4	"A Voice Calling for a Hero"; Transliteration: "Hīrō o Yobu Koe" (Japanese: ヒーローを呼ぶ声)	Katsuya Watanabe	Atsuhiro Tomioka	March 24, 2024
Mira is arrested by police officer Jyo Akuse and brought to Shirabe Saibu, a member of the International Space Agency who wants the Boomboomgers to cooperate with the authorities against the Hashiriyans, which Taiya refuses. Taiya and Shirabe eventually strike a deal, with the ISA giving free rein to the team, in exchange of having Jyo act as a liaison for them.
5	"The Police Officer Will Not Falter"; Transliteration: "Keisatsuya wa Kujikenai" (Japanese: 警察屋はくじけない)	Katsuya Watanabe	Hiroshi Yamaguchi	March 31, 2024
Jyo is eager to join the other Boonboomgers in battle, but Taiya refuses, implying that he does not have what it takes, but his opinion changes when Jyo risks himself to protect the others from danger and he gains the power to transform into Bun Black.
6	"White and Black"; Transliteration: "Shiro to Kuro" (Japanese: シロとクロ)	Hiroyuki Katō	Tatsuto Higuchi	April 7, 2024
Ishiro is not fully convinced of Jyo's character and begins to spy on him, until the Hashiriyans deploy a monster that forces people to show their true feelings and thoughts. Meanwhile, Taiya is attacked by Madrex, which is the leader of the Sanseaters.
7	"Procurer's Brake"; Transliteration: "Chōtatsuya no Burēki" (Japanese: 調達屋のブレーキ)	Hiroyuki Katō	Natsumi Morichi	April 14, 2024
Taiya invites his dealer, Genba Bureki to join them in battle as the fifth Boonboomger, but he refuses. However, when Madrex fights the team with another monster, which proves as more than a match to them, Genba decides to reconsider and transforms into Bun Orange in order to turn the tides of the battle.
8	"Runaway and Divide"; Transliteration: "Bōsō to Bunretsu" (Japanese: 暴走と分裂)	Shojiro Nakazawa	Atsuhiro Tomioka	April 21, 2024
Taiya reveals his real intentions to form the Boonboomgers, which is to participate in the "Big Bang Grand Prix", the biggest and most important race of the entire universe, while fighting the Hashiriyans was not in his original plans. Mira and Jyo feel dissatisfied for not being told about it beforehand, but their worries are cut short when Madrex comes with a scheme to restrain the rest of the team while he has his long awaited showdown with Taiya.
9	"Couriers' Handles"; Transliteration: "Todokeya-tachi no Handoru" (Japanese: 届け屋たちのハンドル)	Shojiro Nakazawa	Atsuhiro Tomioka	April 28, 2024
Taiya is seriously wounded after his fight with Madrex and Shirabe informs the team that the ISA decided to have the Boonboomgers disbanded and their equipment confiscated. In the occasion, Bundorio reveals how he and Taiya met and the beginning of their partnership. Meanwhile, Madrex returns determined to settle his fight with Taiya once and for all.
10	"An Exciting Mission"; Transliteration: "Ukiuki na Misshon" (Japanese: ウキウキなミッション)	Jun Watanabe	Hiroshi Yamaguchi	May 5, 2024
Genba has his first solo delivery job for the ISA. Worried about him, Mira decides to tag along, when the Sanseaters attack the duo.
11	"What the Boy Wants"; Transliteration: "Shōnen ga Hoshii Mono" (Japanese: 少年がほしいもの)	Jun Watanabe	Atsuhiro Tomioka	May 12, 2024
Taiya makes a special delivery to an old friend who inspired him to become a deliverer in the first place. Meanwhile, Cannonborg, another team captain arrives to assist the Sanseaters in taking over Earth.
12	"Bakuage Engine"; Transliteration: "Bakuage Enjin" (Japanese: 爆上エンジン)	Katsuya Watanabe	Kenji Konuta	May 19, 2024
Taiya meets Engine Speedor, a small, sentient car who asks Taiya to deliver him to his partner, Sōsuke Esumi who is the leader of the Go-ongers and is also looking for him.: This episode is a crossover with Engine Sentai Go-onger, celebrating the 15th anniversary of its conclusion.
13	"Treacherous Procurement"; Transliteration: "Uragiri no Chōtatsu" (Japanese: 裏切りの調達)	Katsuya Watanabe	Tatsuto Higuchi	May 26, 2024
Cannonborg completes his secret weapon, Boonboom Killer Robo whose powers leaves the Boonboomgers apathetic. Afterwards, Genba approaches the Sanseaters and offers to work for them with unknown intentions.
14	"Cool and Wild"; Transliteration: "Kūru to Wairudo" (Japanese: クールとワイルド)	Katsuya Watanabe	Natsumi Morichi	June 2, 2024
After Genba having successfully activated Boonboom Safari, Ishiro and Mira pay a visit to an aquarium looking for inspirations to activate Boonboom Marine, when the Sanseaters return with a fixed-up Boonboom Killer Robo, eager for a rematch.
15	"Lock and Key"; Transliteration: "Jō to Kī" (Japanese: 錠とキー)	Koichiro Hayama	Hiroshi Yamaguchi	June 9, 2024
Jyo finds a monster created by the Hashiriyan who refuses to attack humans and befriends him, determined to protect his new friend from the enemy.
16	"Violet Settler"; Transliteration: "Murasaki no Shimatsuya" (Japanese: ムラサキの始末屋)	Koichiro Hayama	Atsuhiro Tomioka	June 16, 2024
The Boonboomgers meet Sakito Homura, a mysterious man who possesses the same powers as them, able to transform into Bun Violet and whose intentions are unknown.
17	"Bun and Byun"; Transliteration: "Bun to Byun" (Japanese: ブンとビュン)	Hiroyuki Katō	Atsuhiro Tomioka	June 23, 2024
Sakito makes an offer to Taiya to join the team. Meanwhie, Sakito's partner Byun Diesel is an old acquaintance of Bundorio and wants to meet him again, but Bundorio refuses and the past between them is revealed.
18	"The Settler Can't Stand It"; Transliteration: "Shimatsuya wa Ki ni Kuwanai" (Japanese: 始末屋は気に食わない)	Hiroyuki Katō	Atsuhiro Tomioka	June 30, 2024
The Hashiriyans blackmail Sakito into eliminate the Boonboomgers for them. As he attacks, Taiya confronts Sakito about his motives and the reason for him to leave Earth. As the two come to terms, Sakito and Byun finally become members of the team.
19	"Amanogawa and the Path of Heaven"; Transliteration: "Amanogawa to Ten no Michi" (Japanese: アマノガワと天の道)	Noboru Takemoto	Tatsuto Higuchi	July 7, 2024
The time has come for Tanabata but the event brings bad memories to Bundorio. Meanwhile, the Hashiriyans send a new monster that brings Taiya into a pinch.
20	"Yesterday Once More"; Transliteration: "Iesutadei Wansu Moa" (Japanese: イエスタデイ 椀ス モア)	Noboru Takemoto	Natsumi Morichi	July 14, 2024
Mira's ex-boyfriend Norio makes an alliance with the Hashiriyans intending to win her back. As Mira and the others fight against his scheme, Taiya shows Norio the real reason why Mira left him to join the Boonboomgers.
21	"Flaming Delivery"; Transliteration: "Honō no Todokemono" (Japanese: 炎の届け物)	Hiroyuki Katō	Hiroshi Yamaguchi	July 21, 2024
A series of unexplained fires have been burning down the town, and the people seem to be in trouble. Genba, who has become a "detective", deduces the cause...!? Eventually, the culprit of the fires is discovered, and Taiya changes into his new form, "Bun Red 119", and takes a stand against him.
22	"Lion's Flaming Fury"; Transliteration: "Honō no Shishifunjin" (Japanese: 炎の獅子奮迅)	Hiroyuki Katō	Hiroshi Yamaguchi	July 28, 2024
The Hashiriyans send a monster who torment some children who are enjoying camping in the mountains, and the Boonboomgers field their new Boonboom Car to fight it.
23	"Flaming Adversity Baseball"; Transliteration: "Honō no Gyakkyō Yakyū" (Japanese: 炎の逆境野球)	Hiroyuki Katō	Kenji Konuta	August 4, 2024
Jyo is training baseball with some children when the Hashiriyans attack them and an enraged Jyo challenges the villains for a match, dragging the entire team, including Bundorio, Byun and Shirabe on it.
24	"The Song I Want to Deliver"; Transliteration: "Todoketai Uta" (Japanese: 届けたい歌)	Koichiro Hayama	Natsumi Morichi	August 11, 2024
The Boonboomgers pay a visit to an after-school daycare facility where Taiya used to attend and learn more about his past, including his first love, when the Hashiriyans invade the place and put Taiya and Sakito to sleep.
25	"Six Fireworks"; Transliteration: "Rokurin no Hanabi" (Japanese: 六輪の花火)	Koichiro Hayama	Tatsuhito Higuchi	August 18, 2024
While Taiya and the others are looking forward to the fireworks display, Cannonborg begins his plan to destroy Earth by forcibly extracting the planet's Gyasolin and the Boonboomgers run against time to stop him.
26	"Secrets of the Universe"; Transliteration: "Uchū no Himitsu" (Japanese: 宇宙の秘密)	Shojiro Nakazawa	Atsuhiro Tomioka	August 25, 2024
Shirabe has a meeting with the Director of Operations of the ISA regarding the Boonboomgers. Meanwhile, the Boonboomgers face the new team captain, Disrace.
27	"Not an Easy Choice"; Transliteration: "Amakunai Sentaku" (Japanese: 甘くない選択)	Shojiro Nakazawa	Atsuhiro Tomioka	September 1, 2024
Genba becomes enraged with Disrace's arrival and decides to leave the Boonboomgers. In the occasion, the other members discover the truth about his past.
28	"Shaking Off the Light"; Transliteration: "Hikari o Furikitte" (Japanese: 光を振り切って)	Katsuya Watanabe	Atsuhiro Tomioka	September 8, 2024
The team is distraught after Genba left and Jyo decides to work even harder to make up for it. Meanwhile, Disrace uses his powers to revive Madrex as a servant of his.
29	"Spy and Family"; Transliteration: "Supai to Famirī" (Japanese: スパイとファミリー)	Katsuya Watanabe	Atsuhiro Tomioka	September 15, 2024
Sakito and Byun help with Ishiro's spy job, while Taiya tells the others the story of how he and Ishiro met and became friends.
30	"The Rampage Is Mine"; Transliteration: "Bōsō wa Ore no Mono" (Japanese: 暴走は俺の物)	Noboru Takemoto	Hiroshi Yamaguchi	September 22, 2024
The Sanseaters try to make Madrex recover his memories to no avail, while Taiya faces him in combat again.
31	"A Magnificent Challenge"; Transliteration: "Karei naru Chōsen" (Japanese: 華麗なる挑戦)	Noboru Takemoto	Kenji Konuta	September 29, 2024
Mira works part-time on a curry restaurant she has loved since childhood. However, when a rival restaurant opens and customers mysteriously disappear, she and the other Boonboomgers investigate if the Hashiriyans are involved.
32	"Hell's Train"; Transliteration: "Jigoku no Densha-gokko" (Japanese: 地獄の電車ごっこ)	Shojiro Nakazawa	Natsumi Morichi	October 6, 2024
Genba challenges Disrace and is defeated. He is rescued by Sakito and Byun and refuses to give up on fighting alone, until he meets Akira Nijino of the ToQgers.: This episode is a crossover with Ressha Sentai ToQger, celebrating its 10th anniversary.
33	"The Procurer Won't Give In"; Transliteration: "Chōtatsuya wa Yuzuranai" (Japanese: 調達屋は譲らない)	Shojiro Nakazawa	Tatsuto Higuchi	October 13, 2024
Genba decides to rely on his friends once again and rejoins the team. In the occasion, the Boonboomgers use their new invention to transform into their powered-up form, Champion Boonboomgers to confront Madrex who is under Disrace's control.
34	"Cars That Carry Dreams"; Transliteration: "Yume wo Hakobu Kuruma" (Japanese: 夢を運ぶクルマ)	Katsuya Watanabe	Atsuhiro Tomioka	October 20, 2024
The Boonboongers finish their newest vehicle, the Champion Carrier, but are attacked by the Sanseaters who blame the Boonboomgers for Madrex's death. Meanwhile, Disrace discovers the truth about Bundorio's hidden past and decide to use it to create distrust among him and his friends.
35	"Blue Champion"; Transliteration: "Aoki Ōja" (Japanese: 碧き王者)	Katsuya Watanabe	Atsuhiro Tomioka	October 27, 2024
The Boonboomgers are astonished upon discovering that Bundorio was once a Hashiriyan and colleague of their leader, Waruido Spindo. As he reveals all the truth to the others, Disrace kidnaps Byun and challenges them for a decisive battle.
36	"The Road to Dreams"; Transliteration: "Yume e to Hashiru Michi" (Japanese: 夢へと走る道)	Katsuya Watanabe	Atsuhiro Tomioka	November 10, 2024
Mira's friend Aki Nogi is envious of Mira's life as a Boonboomger, until she gets hold of Mira's Boonboom Changer and considers transforming into one as well.
37	"Two Spies"; Transliteration: "Futari no Supai" (Japanese: 二人のスパイ)	Koichiro Hayama	Atsuhiro Tomioka	November 17, 2024
Ishiro meets another spy and old friend of his, who kidnaps him and replaces him with a clone created by a Kurumaju, but Taiya realizes his disguise and confronts him.
38	"Vow of the Underlings"; Transliteration: "Sanshita no Chikai" (Japanese: 三下の誓い)	Koichiro Hayama	Tatsuto Higuchi	November 24, 2024
The Sunseaters are astonished with the arrival of Weiwei Yarucar, an elite member from the Hashiriyan who gives an opportunity for Yaiyai to rise up on the organization's ranks but at the cost of abandoning his friends. Meanwhile, Spindo's right hand man, Grantu Risk, also arrives on Earth.
39	"Screaming Planet"; Transliteration: "Himei no Hoshi" (Japanese: 悲鳴の星)	Shojiro Nakazawa	Atsuhiro Tomioka	December 1, 2024
Waruido Spindo arrives on Earth and after a brief exchange with the Boonboomgers, meets the head of ISA who became his ally.
40	"The Immeasurable Man"; Transliteration: "Hakarenai Otoko" (Japanese: はかれない男)	Shojiro Nakazawa	Natsumi Morichi	December 8, 2024
Jyo becomes acquainted with a boy who idolizes the Boonboomgers and faces a monster who uses his power to expose people's most embarrassing secrets.
41	"A Supportive Back"; Transliteration: "Azukeru Senaka" (Japanese: 預ける背中)	Hiroyuki Katō	Tatsuto Higuchi	December 15, 2024
The Boonboomgers are forced by a Kurumaju to play a soccer game and the team goes into disarray when Genba and Sakito have a big fight.
42	"Holy Night Presents"; Transliteration: "Sei naru Yoru no Purezento" (Japanese: 聖なる夜の届け物(プレゼント))	Hiroyuki Katō	Chinatsu Hojo	December 22, 2024
It's Christmas and the Sanseaters are tasked to kidnap Santa Claus but for some reason, Itasha refuses to comply with this plan.
43	"Powerful Handle"; Transliteration: "Gōkai na Handoru" (Japanese: 豪快なハンドル)	Shojiro Nakazawa	Atsuhiro Tomioka	January 5, 2025
Taiya gets confused when Ishiro declares that he is betraying the team and that the Boonboomgers must disband, just when Joe Gibken from the Gokaigers appears to intervene.: This episode is a crossover with Kaizoku Sentai Gokaiger.
44	"The Courier Doesn't Arrive"; Transliteration: "Todokeya ga Todokanai" (Japanese: 届け屋が届かない)	Shun Miyazaki	Atsuhiro Tomioka	January 12, 2025
The Boonboomgers are persecuted by both the Hashiriyan and the ISA who joined forces. Amidst the chaos, Naito approaches Taiya, revealing that he is also collaborating with the Hashiriyans and Spindo challenges the Boonboomgers in person, showing the true extent of his powers.
45	"Enemies of the Earth"; Transliteration: "Chikyū no Teki" (Japanese: 地球の敵)	Koichiro Hayama	Atsuhiro Tomioka	January 19, 2025
Taiya is devastated with Bundorio's death and attempts to fix him up to no avail. Meanwhile, Disrace returns and initiates a plan to turn the public opinion against the Boonboomgers but Sakito and Byun rise against him.
46	"The Future Is in Your Hands"; Transliteration: "Mirai o Kono Te ni" (Japanese: 未来をこの手に)	Koichiro Hayama	Atsuhiro Tomioka	January 26, 2025
Taiya and the others devise a plan to bring Bundorio back to life, but with the society viewing the Boonboomgers as enemies, Jyo is forced to choose between his career and his loyalty to the team. Meanwhile, Yaiyai Yarucar is turned into a Kurumaju and attacks the Boonboomgers.
47	"There Is More Than One Courier"; Transliteration: "Todokeya wa Hitori ja Nai" (Japanese: 届け屋はひとりじゃない)	Shojiro Nakazawa	Atsuhiro Tomioka	February 2, 2025
Mira is offered a chance to have the Boonboomgers spared from Spindo's wrath by marrying him. She apparently accepts the offer and a celebration is held for the whole world to watch, when Taiya and co. finally reveal their plan to turn the tables against the Hashiryians.
48 (Final)	"Your Handle"; Transliteration: "Kimi no Handoru" (Japanese: 君のハンドル)	Shojiro Nakazawa	Atsuhiro Tomioka	February 9, 2025
All the Boonboomgers are reunited again and they challenge Spindo for one last fight to decide the fate of the Earth.
