= Ohsama Sentai King-Ohger =

Japanese TV series

- Genre: Tokusatsu; Science fiction; Superhero fiction; Action; Adventure; Psychological drama; Fantasy; Post-apocalyptic; Thriller
- Created by: Saburo Yatsude
- Written by: Minato Takano; Kaori Kaneko
- Directed by: Kazuya Kamihoriuchi; Koichi Sakamoto; Shojiro Nakazawa; Hiroyuki Kato; Kyohei Yamaguchi; Kazyuki Chatani
- Starring: Taisei Sakai; Aoto Watanabe; Erica Murakami; Yuzuki Hirakawa; So Kaku; Masashi Ikeda; Masato Yano; Yutaka Morioka; Anna Hoshino; Minato Kiso; Yuhei Chiwata; Hokuto Minami; Kaito Okano; Nagisa Hayakawa; Hiroto Yoshimitsu; Marina Mizushima; Kasumi Hasegawa; Mami Kamura; Kotaro Yagi; Kousei Amano
- Voices of: Tomoyuki Shimura; Shin-ichiro Miki; Akira Ishida; Kazuhiro Yamaji; Miyuki Sawashiro; Tomokazu Seki
- Narrated by: Masashi Ikeda
- Opening theme: "Zenryoku King" by Takayuki Furukawa
- Composer: Go Sakabe
- Country of origin: Japan
- Original language: Japanese
- No. of episodes: 50 (list of episodes)

Production
- Producers: Takehiro Ōkawa (TV Asahi); Takahito Ōmori (Toei); Kōichi Yada (Toei Advertising)
- Production location: Tokyo, Japan (Greater Tokyo Area)
- Running time: 24–25 minutes
- Production companies: TV Asahi; Toei Company; Toei Advertising

Original release
- Network: ANN (TV Asahi)
- Release: March 5, 2023 – February 25, 2024

Related
- Avataro Sentai Donbrothers; Bakuage Sentai Boonboomger

Ohsama Sentai King-Ohger (王様戦隊キングオージャー, Ōsama Sentai Kinguōjā; Kingship Squadron King-Ohger) is a Japanese tokusatsu television drama, the 47th installment in Toei Company's long-running Super Sentai series and the fourth produced in the Reiwa era. This series is the first and only one in the franchise where all of the main characters have both an insectoid and royalty motif.

The series premiered on March 5, 2023, joining Kamen Rider Geats and later, Kamen Rider Gotchard in the Super Hero Time lineup on TV Asahi following Avataro Sentai Donbrothers's finale. Part of its plot and characters include some tie-ins with Zyuden Sentai Kyoryuger, celebrating that series's tenth anniversary. The final episode aired in February 2024, and the series was succeeded by Bakuage Sentai Boonboomger in the Super Hero Time block the following month.

== Plot ==
Two millennia ago on the planet Chikyu, a group of heroes joined forces to defeat and exile the Underground Empire Bug Naraku to the planet's subterranean levels through their guardian deity Legend King-Ohger. Afterward, the heroes disbanded, five of them establishing the kingdoms of Shugodom, Nkosopa, Ishabana, Gokkan, and Tofu, respectively. But a prophecy later spreads that the Bug Naraku will return.

In the present, fifteen years after a catastrophe known as the Wrath of God, the current rulers' attempted alliance fails as the Bug Naraku attack Shugodom per the genocide decree of their King Dezunaraku VIII. A Shugodom youth named Gira learned his king King Rcules Husty plots to have the conflict justify his agenda of unifying the kingdoms under his rule, disgusted by Rcules' callous intent of sacrificing their people and steals his Ohger Calibur, the kings' symbol of authority. Gira declares himself as an "evil king" bent on destroying Rcules' reign, awakening the Shugods that form King-Ohger while branded a traitor despite being later revealed to be Rcules' missing younger brother. Gira forms an alliance with the other rulers: President Yanma Gast of Nkosopa, Queen Hymeno Ran of Ishabana, Chief Justice Rita Kaniska of Gokkan, and Overlord Kaguragi Dybowski of Tofu to save their world from the Bug Naraku and depose Rcules while gathering the other Shugods needed to form Legend King-Ohger.

They are eventually joined in their quest by the historian Jeramie Brasieri, revealed as the half-Bug Naraku son of a forgotten sixth hero whose existence was erased from history for falling in love with a Bug Naraku royal, who fabricated the prophecy in a scheme to unite the two races. The six soon form a new alliance known as the "Ohsama Sentai King-Ohger". After Gira exposes the deposed Rcules and succeeds as Shugodom's king, he convinces Dezunaraku to reconcile with humanity once Jeramie learned his prophecy caused the current Bug Naraku attack. But Dezunaraku is fatally wounded by his right hand Kamejim, revealed to have orchestrated the Human/Bug Naraku conflict, with Jeramie establishing an official sixth kingdom of Chikyu for the Bug Naraku to live in peace. Prior to Gira's coronation, the Ohsama Sentai briefly ventured into the underworld of Hākabāka where they meet the founder king Lainor Husty, who cryptically reveals an impending calamity that would befall Chikyuu.

Two years later, the King-Ohgers face a new threat to their world when Kamejim's master, the Galactinsect King Dagded Dujardin, arrives to force Chikyu in resuming the war or be destroyed. But Gira learns that Dagded is the true mastermind of the Human/Bug Naraku conflict by forcing House Husty into his service with his Galactinsect Jesters causing the Wrath of God incident, refusing to allow the war's renewal while he and the others expose Dagded's deeds. Dagded responds by sending the rulers to Earth, learning their ancestors migrated from there while helping the Kyoryugers defeat the revived Deboth Army. Upon their return, the Ohsama Sentai resume control of their kingdoms which were taken over by Dagded's Jesters and Rcules, who eventually reveals that he played the role of a dictator to win Dagded's trust and destroy him, joining forces with them after he completes his plan to kill the Galactinsect King. However, Dagded is later resurrected by the Jesters.

The Ohsama Sentai learn about an ancient power known as the Kings' Proof used by their predecessors to end the war 2000 years ago and reawaken it in order to make stand against Dagded while destroying the remaining Jesters except for Kamejim. Despite with their new powers, the King-Ohgers fail to defeat Dagded and decide to hold him long enough for the inhabitants of the six kingdoms to escape Chikyu. However, the subjects refuse to abandon their kings and together, they participate in one last battle against the Galactinsects, briefly assisted from deceased warriors and kings summoned from Hākabāka, culminating with Kamejim killed and dragged to Hākabāka, and Dagded ultimately destroyed by the Ohsama Sentai and their mecha. Unbeknownst to the Ohsama Sentai, a Kyoryuger leader, Daigo Kiryu, the Kyoryu Red was revealed to have been captured by Dagded all along, until the monarchs indirectly saved him from his imprisonment once they destroyed the Galactinsect King in the final battle. After the battle, the borders of the six kingdoms are abolished and their inhabitants begin traveling and living freely around Chikyu, watched over by the King-Ohgers.

== Production ==
According to Takahito Ōmori, the production of King-Ohger started one and a half years in advance, unlike the usual one-year preparation of previous Sentai series.

The Ohsama Sentai King-Ohger trademark was registered by Toei on September 21, 2022, and published on September 30, 2022.

King-Ohger was officially announced on December 21, 2022. An online production announcement conference introducing the main cast and characters and the artist for the show's theme song was held on February 14, 2023. The series implements extensive on-set virtual production and LED walls produced in collaboration with Sony PCL Inc. This production practice was influenced by works like Disney's The Mandalorian and would be the first work in Japan that uses virtual production.

In fall 2023, Toei announced the series would feature a small crossover with Zyuden Sentai Kyoryuger to commemorate the earlier series' tenth anniversary.

== Episodes ==
No.	English title Original Japanese title	Directed by	Written by	Original release date
1	"I Am King"; Transliteration: "Ware wa Ō nari" (Japanese: 我は王なり)	Kazuya Kamihoriuchi	Minato Takano	March 5, 2023
2	"A King for Whose Sake"; Transliteration: "Taga Tame no Ō" (Japanese: 誰がための王)	Kazuya Kamihoriuchi	Minato Takano	March 12, 2023
3	"To Willfully Devote"; Transliteration: "Wagamama o Sasagu" (Japanese: 我がままを捧ぐ)	Kazuya Kamihoriuchi	Minato Takano	March 19, 2023
4	"A Lordly Reception"; Transliteration: "Tono no Omotenashi" (Japanese: 殿のオモテなし)	Kazuya Kamihoriuchi	Minato Takano	March 26, 2023
5	"The King of Winter Is Coming"; Transliteration: "Fuyu no Ō Kitaru" (Japanese: 冬の王来たる)	Kazuya Kamihoriuchi	Minato Takano	April 2, 2023
6	"Return of the Prince"; Transliteration: "Ōji no Kikan" (Japanese: 王子の帰還)	Kyohei Yamaguchi	Minato Takano	April 9, 2023
7	"Wrath of God"; Transliteration: "Kami no Ikari" (Japanese: 神の怒り)	Kyohei Yamaguchi	Minato Takano	April 16, 2023
8	"King and Prince in Trial by Combat"; Transliteration: "Ō to Ōji no Kettō Saiban" (Japanese: 王と王子の決闘裁判)	Kyohei Yamaguchi	Minato Takano	April 23, 2023
9	"Gira on the Run"; Transliteration: "Gira Tōsōchū" (Japanese: ギラ逃走中)	Hiroyuki Katō	Minato Takano	April 30, 2023
10	"The Fabled Guardian Deity"; Transliteration: "Densetsu no Shugoshin" (Japanese: 伝説の守護神)	Hiroyuki Katō	Minato Takano	May 7, 2023
11	"Eerie! The Man in the Spider Mask"; Transliteration: "Kaiki! Kumo Kamen no Otoko" (Japanese: 怪奇！クモ仮面の男)	Hiroyuki Katō	Minato Takano	May 14, 2023
12	"The Sixth King"; Transliteration: "Roku-ninme no Ōsama" (Japanese: 6人目の王様)	Kazuya Kamihoriuchi	Minato Takano	May 21, 2023
13	"The Angry Spider"; Transliteration: "Ikari no Supaidā" (Japanese: 怒りのスパイダー)	Kazuyuki Chatani	Minato Takano	May 28, 2023
14	"Together With Moffun"; Transliteration: "Moffun to Issho" (Japanese: もっふんといっしょ)	Kyohei Yamaguchi	Minato Takano	June 4, 2023
15	"A Visit to Suzume"; Transliteration: "Suzume ni Omimai" (Japanese: スズメにお見舞い)	Kyohei Yamaguchi	Minato Takano	June 11, 2023
16	"The 10-Year-Old Chief Justice"; Transliteration: "Jussai no Saibanchō" (Japanese: 10才の裁判長)	Kyohei Yamaguchi	Minato Takano	June 18, 2023
17	"The King Does Not Flee"; Transliteration: "Ō wa Nigenai" (Japanese: 王は逃げない)	Hiroyuki Katō	Minato Takano	June 25, 2023
18	"The Crown of Beginnings"; Transliteration: "Hajimari no Ōkan" (Japanese: 始まりの王冠)	Hiroyuki Katō	Minato Takano	July 2, 2023
19	"Ohsama Sentai King-Ohger"; Transliteration: "Ōsama Sentai Kinguōjā" (Japanese: 王様戦隊キングオージャー)	Hiroyuki Katō	Minato Takano	July 9, 2023
20	"Duel of Kings"; Transliteration: "Ō to Ō no Kettō" (Japanese: 王と王の決闘)	Kyohei Yamaguchi	Minato Takano	July 16, 2023
21	"Push Forward on the High Road"; Transliteration: "Tsukisusume Ōdō o" (Japanese: 突き進め王道を)	Kyohei Yamaguchi	Minato Takano	July 23, 2023
22	"Great Gathering of Shugods"; Transliteration: "Shugoddo Daishūgō" (Japanese: シュゴッド大集合)	Kazuyuki Chatani	Minato Takano	July 30, 2023
23	"Shugodom's Moving Castle"; Transliteration: "Shugoddamu no Ugoku Shiro" (Japanese: シュゴッダムの動く城)	Kazuyuki Chatani	Minato Takano	August 6, 2023
24	"King of the In-Between vs. King of the Abyss"; Transliteration: "Hazama no Ō Tai Naraku no Ō" (Japanese: 狭間の王VS奈落の王)	Hiroyuki Katō	Minato Takano	August 13, 2023
25	"War of the Kings and the People"; Transliteration: "Ō to Tami no Tatakai" (Japanese: 王と民の戦い)	Hiroyuki Katō	Minato Takano	August 20, 2023
26	"Birth of a New Kingdom"; Transliteration: "Shin Ōkoku no Tanjō" (Japanese: 新王国の誕生)	Hiroyuki Katō	Minato Takano	August 27, 2023
27	"Arrival of the Galactinsect King"; Transliteration: "Uchūō no Tōrai" (Japanese: 宇蟲王の到来)	Kazuya Kamihoriuchi	Minato Takano	September 3, 2023
28	"Shuffle Kings!"; Transliteration: "Shaffuru Kingusu!" (Japanese: シャッフル・キングス！)	Kazuya Kamihoriuchi	Minato Takano	September 10, 2023
29	"Disqualified as King"; Transliteration: "Ōsama Shikkaku" (Japanese: 王様失格)	Kazuya Kamihoriuchi	Minato Takano	September 17, 2023
30	"Frozen Scales"; Transliteration: "Itetsuku Tenbin" (Japanese: 凍てつく天秤)	Shojiro Nakazawa	Minato Takano	September 24, 2023
31	"2000 Years of Love"; Transliteration: "Nisen-nen no Ai" (Japanese: 二千年の愛)	Shojiro Nakazawa	Minato Takano	October 1, 2023
32	"Encounter! Kyoryu!"; Transliteration: "Sōgū! Kyōryū!" (Japanese: 遭遇！キョウリュウ！)	Koichi Sakamoto	Kaori Kaneko (Note: Plot supervision by Minato Takano)	October 8, 2023
33	"Shugo! King and Kyoryu!!"; Transliteration: "Shūgō! Kingu to Kyōryū!!" (Japanese: シューゴー！キングとキョウリュウ！！)	Koichi Sakamoto	Kaori Kaneko	October 15, 2023
34	"Shugo Mask Strikes Back"; Transliteration: "Shugo Kamen no Gyakushū" (Japanese: シュゴ仮面の逆襲)	Hiroyuki Katō	Minato Takano	October 22, 2023
35	"Don't Cry, Slack-Jawed Tanuki"; Transliteration: "Nakuna Sukapon Tanuki" (Japanese: 泣くなスカポンタヌキ)	Hiroyuki Katō	Minato Takano	October 29, 2023
36	"Hymeno's Matchmaking Strategy"; Transliteration: "Himeno no Omiai Daisakusen" (Japanese: ヒメノのお見合い大作戦)	Hiroyuki Katō	Minato Takano	November 12, 2023
37	"Iroki's Rebellion"; Transliteration: "Iroki no Ran" (Japanese: イロキの乱)	Kazuya Kamihoriuchi	Minato Takano	November 19, 2023
38	"Steadfast Idol Debut"; Transliteration: "Fudō no Aidoru Debyū" (Japanese: 不動のアイドルデビュー)	Kazuya Kamihoriuchi	Minato Takano	November 26, 2023
39	"Nkosopa Showdown"; Transliteration: "Nkosopa Chōjō Kessen" (Japanese: ンコソパ頂上決戦)	Kazuya Kamihoriuchi	Minato Takano	December 3, 2023
40	"I Am King and Prince"; Transliteration: "Ware wa Ō de Ōji nari" (Japanese: 我は王で王子なり)	Hiroyuki Katō	Minato Takano	December 10, 2023
41	"Time to Save the Universe"; Transliteration: "Uchū o Sukū Toki" (Japanese: 宇宙を救う時)	Hiroyuki Katō	Minato Takano	December 17, 2023
42	"The Secrets of King Rcules"; Transliteration: "Rakuresu-ō no Himitsu" (Japanese: ラクレス王の秘密)	Kazuyuki Chatani	Minato Takano	December 24, 2023
43	"The Overlord's Deadly Sin"; Transliteration: "Haō no Taizai" (Japanese: 覇王の大罪)	Kazuyuki Chatani	Minato Takano	January 7, 2024
44	"Proof of the Kings! The True Alliance of the Six Kingdoms"; Transliteration: "Ō no Akashi! Shin no Roku Ōkoku Dōmei" (Japanese: 王の証！真の六王国同盟)	Kazuyuki Chatani	Minato Takano	January 14, 2024
45	"Heirs to the King"; Transliteration: "Ō o Tsugu Mono-tachi" (Japanese: 王を継ぐ者たち)	Hiroyuki Katō	Minato Takano	January 21, 2024
46	"Know the Beauty of Life"; Transliteration: "Inochi no Utsukushisa o Shire" (Japanese: 命の美しさを知れ)	Hiroyuki Katō	Minato Takano	January 28, 2024
47	"Silence God"; Transliteration: "Kami o Damarasero" (Japanese: 神を黙らせろ)	Hiroyuki Katō	Minato Takano	February 4, 2024
48	"Farewell, Dear People"; Transliteration: "Saraba, Shin'ai Naru Tami yo" (Japanese: さらば、親愛なる民よ)	Kazuya Kamihoriuchi	Minato Takano	February 11, 2024
49	"The King Is Here"; Transliteration: "Ō wa Koko ni Iru" (Japanese: 王はここにいる)	Kazuya Kamihoriuchi	Minato Takano	February 18, 2024
50	"We Will Rule the World"; Transliteration: "Oresama-tachi ga Sekai o Shihai Suru" (Japanese: 俺様たちが世界を支配する)	Kazuya Kamihoriuchi	Minato Takano	February 25, 2024

== Films & Specials ==
=== Theatrical ===
==== Adventure Heaven ====
Ohsama Sentai King-Ohger the Movie: Adventure Heaven (映画 王様戦隊キングオージャー アドベンチャー・ヘブン, Eiga Ōsama Sentai Kinguōjā Adobenchā Hebun) is a film released in Japanese theaters on July 28, 2023, double-billed with Kamen Rider Geats the Movie: 4 Aces and the Black Fox. The events of the film take place between episodes 23 and 24 of the television series. A Complete version is later released with new scenes relating to the second half of the series.

=== V-Cinema ===
==== King-Ohger vs. Donbrothers & King-Ohger vs. Kyoryuger ====
A two crossover film series for V-Cinema release comprised King-Ohger crossovers with Avataro Sentai Donbrothers and Zyuden Sentai Kyoryuger, respectively, which takes place after the TV series' Bug Naraku arc for vs. Donbrother and Galactinsect arc for vs. Kyoryuger. They received a limited theatrical release on April 26, 2024, followed by both DVD and Blu-ray releases on October 9, 2024.

- Ohsama Sentai King-Ohger vs. Donbrothers (王様戦隊キングオージャーVSドンブラザーズ, Ōsama Sentai Kinguōjā Tai Donburazāzu)
- Ohsama Sentai King-Ohger vs. Kyoryuger (王様戦隊キングオージャーVSキョウリュウジャー, Ōsama Sentai Kinguōjā Tai Kyōryūjā): Serves as a celebration of the 10th anniversary of Kyoryuger. The main cast of Kyoryuger, Ryo Ryusei, Syuusuke Saito, Yamato Kinjo, Akihisa Shiono, Ayuri Konno, and Atsushi Maruyama, who previously reprised their roles in episodes 32 and 33 of King-Ohger, and Marie Iitoyo return for this film.

==== Boonboomger vs. King-Ohger ====
Bakuage Sentai Boonboomger vs. King-Ohger (爆上戦隊ブンブンジャーVSキングオージャー, Bakuage Sentai Bunbunjā Tai Kinguōjā) is a V-Cinema release that features a crossover between King-Ohger and Bakuage Sentai Boonboomger. The V-Cinema received a limited theatrical release on May 1, 2025, followed by its DVD and Blu-ray release on October 29, 2025.

=== Special episodes ===
- Ohsama Sentai King-Ohger: The Secrets of King Rcules (王様戦隊キングオージャー ラクレス王の秘密, Ōsama Sentai Kinguōjā Rakuresu-ō no Himitsu): A three-episode web-exclusive series released on Toei Tokusatsu YouTube Official YouTube channel on April 23, 2023. The events of the web-exclusive series take place between episodes 2 and 3 of the television series.
- Tokusou Sentai Dekaranger with Tombo Ohger (特捜戦隊デカレンジャーwithトンボオージャー, Tokusō Sentai Dekarenjā Wizu Tonbo Ōjā): A web-exclusive crossover special between King-Ohger and Tokusou Sentai Dekaranger released on Toei Tokusatsu Fan Club on June 16, 2024.
- Ohsama Sentai King-Ohger in Space (王様戦隊キングオージャー IN SPACE, Ōsama Sentai Kinguōjā In Supēsu): A web-exclusive crossover special released on Toei Tokusatsu Fan Club on November 10, 2024. Keisuke Minami and Atsushi Maruyama reprised their respective roles as Tsurugi Ohtori from Uchu Sentai Kyuranger and Utsusemimaru from Kyoryuger while Tetsu Inada reprised his voice role as Doggie Kruger from Dekaranger. The special also features a small cameo of Captain Marvelous from Kaizoku Sentai Gokaiger, where he is portrayed by an unknown actor instead being reprised by Ryota Ozawa. The events of the special take place after Ohsama Sentai King-Ohger vs. Kyoryuger.

== Manga ==
Rita of Gokkan: Ohsama Sentai King-Ohger (ゴッカンのリタ 王様戦隊キングオージャー, Gokkan no Rita Ōsama Sentai Kinguōjā) is a 24-chapter manga serialized on Toei Tokusatsu Fan Club, BookLive, BookLive Fun, and Piccoma from November 11, 2023 to February 17, 2024. The manga tells the first five episodes of the television series from Rita Kaniska's point of view.

== Cast ==
- Gira Husty (ギラ・ハスティー, Gira Hasutī): (Note: Credited by first name until episode 42.) Taisei Sakai (酒井 大成, Sakai Taisei)
- Yanma Gast (ヤンマ・ガスト, Yanma Gasuto): Aoto Watanabe (渡辺 碧斗, Watanabe Aoto)
- Hymeno Ran (ヒメノ・ラン, Himeno Ran): Erica Murakami (村上 愛花, Murakami Erika)
- Rita Kaniska (リタ・カニスカ, Rita Kanisuka): Yuzuki Hirakawa (平川 結月, Hirakawa Yuzuki)
- Kaguragi Dybowski (カグラギ・ディボウスキ, Kaguragi Dibōsuki): So Kaku (佳久 創, Kaku Sō)
- Jeramie Brasieri (ジェラミー・ブラシエリ, Jeramī Burashieri)/Narrator: Masashi Ikeda (池田 匡志, Ikeda Masashi)
- Rcules Husty (ラクレス・ハスティー, Rakuresu Hasutī): (Note: Pronounced "Racules".) Masato Yano (矢野 聖人, Yano Masato)
- Duga (ドゥーガ, Dūga): Yutaka Morioka (森岡 豊, Morioka Yutaka)
- Bocimar (ボシマール, Boshimāru): Jubun Fukuzawa (福澤 重文, Fukuzawa Jūbun)
- Shiokara (シオカラ): Yuhei Chiwata (千綿 勇平, Chiwata Yūhei)
- Sebastian (セバスチャン, Sebasuchan): Hiroto Yoshimitsu (吉満 寛人, Yoshimitsu Hiroto)
- Morfonia (モルフォーニャ, Morufōnya): Kasumi Hasegawa (長谷川 かすみ, Hasegawa Kasumi)
- Kogane (コガネ): Anna Hoshino (星乃 あんな, Hoshino An'na)
- Bun (ブーン, Būn): Minato Kiso (木曽 源, Kiso Minato)
- Akka (アッカ): Hokuto Minami (南 北斗, Minami Hokuto)
- Usuba (ウスバ): Kaito Okano (岡野 海斗, Okano Kaito)
- Mayuta (マユタ): Nagisa Hayakawa (早川 渚紗, Hayakawa Nagisa)
- Elegans Mon (エレガンス・モーン, Eregansu Mōn): Marina Mizushima (水島 麻理奈, Mizushima Marina)
- Creo Urbanus (クレオ・ウルバヌス, Kureo Urubanusu): Matsuri Kamisato (神里 まつり, Kamisato Matsuri)
- Suzume Dybowski (スズメ・ディボウスキ, Suzume Dibōsuki): Mami Kamura (加村 真美, Kamura Mami)
- Kofuki (コフキ): Kaisei Kawano (川野 快晴, Kawano Kaisei)
- Grodi Leucodium (グローディ・ロイコディウム, Gurōdi Roikodiumu): Kousei Amano (天野 浩成, Amano Kōsei)

=== Voice cast ===
- Dezunaraku VIII (デズナラク8世, Dezunaraku Hassei): Tomoyuki Shimura (志村 知幸, Shimura Tomoyuki)
- Kamejim Unka (カメジム・ウンカ, Kamejimu Unka): Shin-ichiro Miki (三木 眞一郎, Miki Shin'ichiro)
- Daigorg (ダイゴーグ, Daigōgu): Kōsuke Takaguchi (高口 公介, Takaguchi Kōsuke)
- Geroujim (ゲロウジーム, Gerōjīmu), Minongan Mouz (ミノンガン・モウズ, Minongan Mōzu): Tomokazu Seki (関 智一, Seki Tomokazu)
- Dagded Dujardin (ダグデド・ドゥジャルダン, Dagudedo Dujarudan): Akira Ishida (石田 彰, Ishida Akira)
- Goma Rosalia (ゴーマ・ローザリア, Gōma Rōzaria): Kazuhiro Yamaji (山路 和弘, Yamaji Kazuhiro)
- Hilbil Lich (ヒルビル・リッチ, Hirubiru Ritchi): Miyuki Sawashiro (沢城 みゆき, Sawashiro Miyuki)
- Kuroda (クロダ): Kohsuke Toriumi (鳥海 浩輔, Toriumi Kōsuke)
- King-Ohger Equipment: Kishō Taniyama (谷山 紀章, Taniyama Kishō)
- Spider Kumonos Equipment: Chogakusei (超学生, Chōgakusei)

=== Guest cast ===
- Kare (カーレ, Kāre; 3): Hiroki Konno (今野 浩喜, Kon'no Hiroki)
- Metally (メタリー, Metarī; 7, 49): Alisa Durbrow (ダーブロウ 有紗, Dāburō Arisa)
- Nephila (ネフィラ・イドモナラク・ネ, Nefira Idomonaraku Ne; Voice; 12, 30–31, 49): Kikuko Inoue (井上 喜久子, Inoue Kikuko)
- Moffun (もっふん; Voice; 14, 16, 31): Hōchū Ōtsuka (大塚 芳忠, Ōtsuka Hōchū) (Note: Uncredited in episodes 14 and 16.)
- Karras Dehaan (カーラス・デハーン, Kārasu Dehān; 16, 30, 49): (Note: Credited by first name.) Rei Yoshii (吉井 怜, Yoshii Rei)
- Shiron (シロン; 16): Kisuke Iida (飯田 基祐, Iida Kisuke)
- Ian Yorkland (イアン・ヨークランド, Ian Yōkurando; 32–33): Syuusuke Saito (斉藤 秀翼, Saitō Shūsuke)
- Nobuharu Udo (有働 ノブハル, Udō Nobuharu; 32–33): Yamato Kinjo (金城 大和, Kinjō Yamato)
- Souji Rippukan (立風館 ソウジ, Rippūkan Sōji; 32–33): Akihisa Shiono (塩野 瑛久, Shiono Akihisa)
- Amy Yuuzuki (アミィ結月, Amyi Yūzuki; 32–33): Ayuri Konno (今野 鮎莉, Konno Ayuri)
- Gentle (ジェントル, Jentoru; 32): Kentaro Shimazu (島津 健太郎, Shimazu Kentarō)
- Kyoryu Red (キョウリュウレッド, Kyōryū Reddo; Voice; 32), Daigo Kiryu (桐生 ダイゴ, Kiryū Daigo; Voice; 33): Ryo Ryusei (竜星 涼, Ryūsei Ryō)
- Kyoryu Gold (キョウリュウゴールド, Kyōryū Gōrudo; Voice; 32): Atsushi Maruyama (丸山 敦史, Maruyama Atsushi)
- Canderrilla (キャンデリラ, Kyanderira; Voice; 32): Haruka Tomatsu (戸松 遥, Tomatsu Haruka)
- Luckyulo (ラッキューロ, Rakkyūro; Voice; 32): Ai Orikasa (折笠 愛, Orikasa Ai)
- Yuko Fukui (福井 優子, Fukui Yūko; 33): Ayumi Kinoshita (木下 あゆ美, Kinoshita Ayumi)
- Suji (スジ; 35, 47, 49–50): (Note: Credited in episode 47 as Prisoner 1.) Tetsu Inada (稲田 徹, Inada Tetsu)
- Iroki (イロキ; 37, 49): Akiko Hinagata (雛形 あきこ, Hinagata Akiko)
- Marina Iko (イコ・マリナ, Iko Marina; 38): Rina Ikoma (生駒 里奈, Ikoma Rina)
- Causus Husty (コーサス・ハスティー, Kōsasu Hasutī; 43), Lainior Husty (ライニオール・ハスティー, Rainiōru Hasutī; Voice; 49): Nakamura Shidō II (中村 獅童)
- Devonica (デボニカ, Debonika; 49): Ayane Sakura (佐倉 綾音, Sakura Ayane)

== Theme song ==
- "Zenryoku King" (全力キング, Zenryoku Kingu; lit. "Full Power King")
  - Composition & Arrangement: Kentaro Sonoda (園田 健太郎, Sonoda Kentarō)
  - Lyrics & Artist: Takayuki Furukawa (古川 貴之, Furukawa Takayuki)

== Reception ==
Ohsama Sentai King-Ohger has been ranked third on the list of 100 Internet Buzzwords of 2023 in Japan. One day after the airing of the 49th episode, " #キングオージャー最終三話劇場版" (King-Ohger Last Three Episode Theatrical Version) became the most trending hashtag in Japan on Twitter, which was a fan movement rallied by actor Yosuke Ito to demand a theatrical release of the show's final episodes.

== See also ==
- Hirogaru Sky! Precure
- Kamen Rider Geats
- Kamen Rider Gotchard
- Zyuden Sentai Kyoryuger
