= Bakuage Sentai Boonboomger =

Japanese TV series

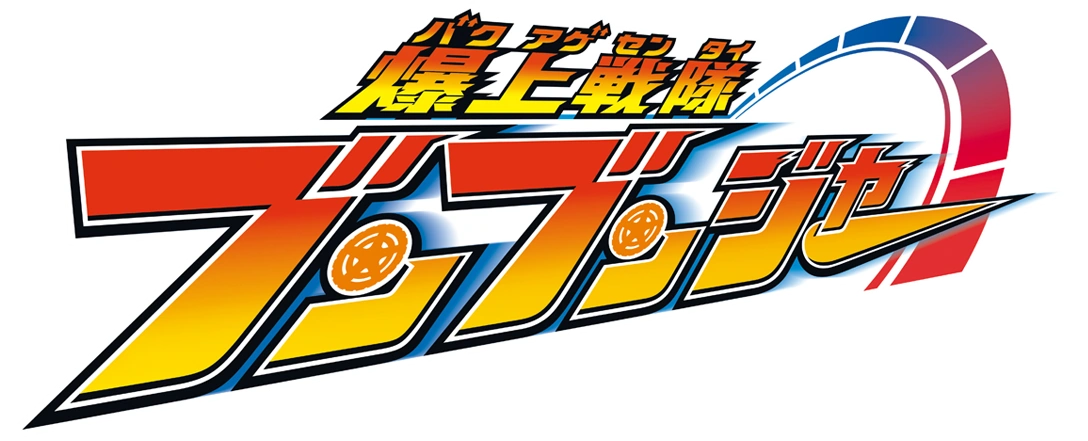
- Genre: Tokusatsu; Science fiction; Superhero fiction; Action
- Created by: Saburo Yatsude
- Written by: Atsuhiro Tomioka; Tatsuto Higuchi; Natsumi Morichi; Hiroshi Yamaguchi; Kenji Konuta; Chinatsu Hojo
- Directed by: Shojiro Nakazawa; Noboru Takemoto; Koichiro Hayama; Hiroyuki Kato; Katsuya Wantanbe; Jun Watanabe; Shun Miyazaki
- Starring: Haruhi Iuchi; Yuki Hayama; Miu Suzuki; Ryu Saito; Satoru Soma; Yu Miyazawa; Hashiyasume Atsuko
- Voices of: Rica Matsumoto; Natsuki Hanae; Junichi Suwabe; Nana Mizuki; Sumire Morohoshi; Hiroshi Kamiya; Kujira; Showtaro Morikubo; Tsutomu Isobe; Koji Yusa
- Opening theme: "Bakuage Sentai Boonboomger" by Masaaki Endoh
- Ending theme: "Kotsukotsu-Pon-Pon" by Rica Matsumoto
- Composers: Yoshiya Ikeda; Kota Yokoseki
- Country of origin: Japan
- Original language: Japanese
- No. of episodes: 48 (list of episodes)

Production
- Producers: Takehiro Ōkawa (TV Asahi); Keisuke Shibataka (TV Asahi); Yoshito Kuji (Toei); Kōichi Yada (Toei Advertising)
- Production location: Tokyo, Japan (Greater Tokyo Area)
- Running time: 24–25 minutes
- Production companies: TV Asahi; Toei Company; Toei Advertising

Original release
- Network: ANN (TV Asahi)
- Release: March 3, 2024 – February 9, 2025

Related
- Ohsama Sentai King-Ohger; No.1 Sentai Gozyuger

Bakuage Sentai Boonboomger (爆上戦隊ブンブンジャー, Bakuage Sentai Bunbunjā; Explosive Squadron Boonboomger) is a Japanese Tokusatsu television series, the 48th installment in Toei Company's Super Sentai series, and the fifth produced in the Reiwa era. The series is based on vehicles and explosions, and is the seventh and final Sentai themed after vehicles. (Note: Other official vehicle-themed Super Sentai include Kousoku Sentai Turboranger, Gekisou Sentai Carranger, GoGo Sentai Boukenger, Engine Sentai Go-Onger, Ressha Sentai ToQger, and Mashin Sentai Kiramager.)

The series aired from March 3, 2024, to February 9, 2025, along Kamen Rider Gotchard and later, Kamen Rider Gavv in the Super Hero Time lineup on TV Asahi following Ohsama Sentai King-Ohger's finale and the series was succeeded by No.1 Sentai Gozyuger.

== Plot ==
Taiya Hando is a courier who befriends an alien machine life form named Bundorio Bunderas, helping him develop equipment for an important intergalactic race known as the "Big Bang Grand Prix". Enlisting freelance spy Ishiro Meita and supplier Genba Bureki, Taiya and Bundorio establish the Boonboomgers and moonlight as a high-stakes freelance delivery service. But when Earth is invaded by a criminal group known as the Hashiriyan, Taiya recruits two new members: Mira Shifuto, a girl who becomes involved with them after they rescue her from an unwanted marriage, and Jyo Akuse, a police officer who serves as the group's liaison with the authorities, most notably Shirabe Saibu, member of the International Space Agency (ISA) who becomes their main contact. The assembled Boonboomgers balance their lives between accomplishing missions from various clients and fighting off the Hashiriyan, later gaining the assistance of the interstellar traveler Sakito Homura and his alien companion, Byun Diesel, and the occasional help from members of other Super Sentai.

The series is divided into four arcs called "Laps", true to its racing car theme.

- 1st Lap (Episodes 1–9): It introduces the main characters and the Sanseaters, a group of low-ranked Hashiriyan. After successive failures, the Sanseaters are assisted by their leader Team Captain Madrex, who develops an obsession with defeating Taiya but ends up getting destroyed by the Boonboomgers instead.
- 2nd Lap (Episodes 10–25): Cannonborg, another team leader, is dispatched to Earth to help the Sanseaters against the Boonboomgers, using his ability to upgrade the monsters created by them and even create his own, evil version of the Boonboomgers' giant robot. After a short meeting with Sōsuke Esumi of the Go-ongers and his Engine partners, the Boonboomgers gain inspiration to develop additional mecha to their arsenal. Meanwhile, Sakito Homura and Byun Diesel arrive on Earth to make a delivery to Cannonborg and meet the Boonboomgers, eventually joining the team and together, they foil Cannonborg's plans and destroy him.
- 3rd Lap (Episodes 26–35): Following Madrex and Cannonborg's failures, the Hashiriyans send another captain, Disrace, who restores Madrex as his brainwashed minion. The other Boonboomgers learn that Genba is an alien whose planet was taken over by Disrace and Genba decides to leave the team to not involve the others in his revenge. Genba confronts Disrace by himself and is defeated, but is encouraged by Akira Nijino of the ToQgers to rely on his friends again and rejoin the Boonboomgers. Together, they defeat Madrex and free him from Disrace's control, but Madrex ends up dying again because of Disrace's modifications in his body. Disrace discovers that Bundorio was once a Hashiriyan and attempts to use this info to seed distrust among the team, which backfires once Bundorio reveals that he was deceived into joining by their leader, Waruido Spindo, before he learned all the truth about the organization and fled, faking his death after setting a trap that led to Spindo being arrested. Together, the Boonboomgers help Genba enact his revenge and destroy Disrace using the Champion Carrier, a massive trailer developed upon inspiration from the ToQgers' Ressha.
- Final Lap (Episodes 36–48): Having learned that Bundorio is still alive, Waruido Spindo arrives on Earth alongside his right-hand man, Grantu Risk, in order to get revenge on Bundorio for his imprisonment. The Hashiriyans strike a deal with ISA's director Eiichiro Tokoyari and businessman Raita Naito, who is also Taiya's mentor, offering them control over Earth in exchange for their loyalty, and turning the authorities and public opinion against the Boonboomgers. Spindo mortally wounds Bundorio but thanks to a hint from Nicola Keydoor, a friend and princess from Planet Trickle who delivers them a message through Joe Gibken of the Gokaigers, they devise a plan to bring Bundorio back to life, while the Sanseaters get fed up of Spindo's treacherous ways and desert from the group. The Boonboomgers fake surrendering to the Hashiriyans and take the opportunity to lay a trap for Spindo. With help from the energy of the crowd supporting the Boonboomgers, Bundorio revives and defeats Spindo with Taiya's help, while Naito and Tokoyari are arrested. Afterwards, Shirabe assumes Tokoyari's place as head of ISA and Sakito stays behind with Byun to protect the Earth while Bundorio and the rest of the team depart to space and help liberate the planets under Hashiriyan rule before setting to realize their dream of participating in the BBG.

== Production ==
The Bakuage Sentai Boonboomger trademark was registered by Toei Company on September 1, 2023, and published on September 11, 2023.

Boonboomger was officially announced on December 22, 2023. An online production announcement conference introducing the main cast and characters and the artist for the show's ending theme song was held on February 18, 2024.

== Episodes ==
No.	Title	Directed by	Written by	Original release date
1	"Courier's Handle"; Transliteration: "Todokeya no Handoru" (Japanese: 届け屋のハンドル)	Shojiro Nakazawa	Atsuhiro Tomioka	March 3, 2024
2	"The Informer Does Not Approve"; Transliteration: "Jōhōya wa Mitomenai" (Japanese: 情報屋は認めない)	Shojiro Nakazawa	Atsuhiro Tomioka	March 10, 2024
3	"The Motorist Won't Stop"; Transliteration: "Unten'ya ga Tomaranai" (Japanese: 運転屋が止まらない)	Shojiro Nakazawa	Atsuhiro Tomioka	March 17, 2024
4	"A Voice Calling for a Hero"; Transliteration: "Hīrō o Yobu Koe" (Japanese: ヒーローを呼ぶ声)	Katsuya Watanabe	Atsuhiro Tomioka	March 24, 2024
5	"The Police Officer Will Not Falter"; Transliteration: "Keisatsuya wa Kujikenai" (Japanese: 警察屋はくじけない)	Katsuya Watanabe	Hiroshi Yamaguchi	March 31, 2024
6	"White and Black"; Transliteration: "Shiro to Kuro" (Japanese: シロとクロ)	Hiroyuki Katō	Tatsuto Higuchi	April 7, 2024
7	"Procurer's Brake"; Transliteration: "Chōtatsuya no Burēki" (Japanese: 調達屋のブレーキ)	Hiroyuki Katō	Natsumi Morichi	April 14, 2024
8	"Runaway and Divide"; Transliteration: "Bōsō to Bunretsu" (Japanese: 暴走と分裂)	Shojiro Nakazawa	Atsuhiro Tomioka	April 21, 2024
9	"Couriers' Handles"; Transliteration: "Todokeya-tachi no Handoru" (Japanese: 届け屋たちのハンドル)	Shojiro Nakazawa	Atsuhiro Tomioka	April 28, 2024
10	"An Exciting Mission"; Transliteration: "Ukiuki na Misshon" (Japanese: ウキウキなミッション)	Jun Watanabe	Hiroshi Yamaguchi	May 5, 2024
11	"What the Boy Wants"; Transliteration: "Shōnen ga Hoshii Mono" (Japanese: 少年がほしいもの)	Jun Watanabe	Atsuhiro Tomioka	May 12, 2024
12	"Bakuage Engine"; Transliteration: "Bakuage Enjin" (Japanese: 爆上エンジン)	Katsuya Watanabe	Kenji Konuta	May 19, 2024
13	"Treacherous Procurement"; Transliteration: "Uragiri no Chōtatsu" (Japanese: 裏切りの調達)	Katsuya Watanabe	Tatsuto Higuchi	May 26, 2024
14	"Cool and Wild"; Transliteration: "Kūru to Wairudo" (Japanese: クールとワイルド)	Katsuya Watanabe	Natsumi Morichi	June 2, 2024
15	"Lock and Key"; Transliteration: "Jō to Kī" (Japanese: 錠とキー)	Koichiro Hayama	Hiroshi Yamaguchi	June 9, 2024
16	"Violet Settler"; Transliteration: "Murasaki no Shimatsuya" (Japanese: ムラサキの始末屋)	Koichiro Hayama	Atsuhiro Tomioka	June 16, 2024
17	"Bun and Byun"; Transliteration: "Bun to Byun" (Japanese: ブンとビュン)	Hiroyuki Katō	Atsuhiro Tomioka	June 23, 2024
18	"The Settler Can't Stand It"; Transliteration: "Shimatsuya wa Ki ni Kuwanai" (Japanese: 始末屋は気に食わない)	Hiroyuki Katō	Atsuhiro Tomioka	June 30, 2024
19	"Amanogawa and the Path of Heaven"; Transliteration: "Amanogawa to Ten no Michi" (Japanese: アマノガワと天の道)	Noboru Takemoto	Tatsuto Higuchi	July 7, 2024
20	"Yesterday Once More"; Transliteration: "Iesutadei Wansu Moa" (Japanese: イエスタデイ 椀ス モア)	Noboru Takemoto	Natsumi Morichi	July 14, 2024
21	"Flaming Delivery"; Transliteration: "Honō no Todokemono" (Japanese: 炎の届け物)	Hiroyuki Katō	Hiroshi Yamaguchi	July 21, 2024
22	"Lion's Flaming Fury"; Transliteration: "Honō no Shishifunjin" (Japanese: 炎の獅子奮迅)	Hiroyuki Katō	Hiroshi Yamaguchi	July 28, 2024
23	"Flaming Adversity Baseball"; Transliteration: "Honō no Gyakkyō Yakyū" (Japanese: 炎の逆境野球)	Hiroyuki Katō	Kenji Konuta	August 4, 2024
24	"The Song I Want to Deliver"; Transliteration: "Todoketai Uta" (Japanese: 届けたい歌)	Koichiro Hayama	Natsumi Morichi	August 11, 2024
25	"Six Fireworks"; Transliteration: "Rokurin no Hanabi" (Japanese: 六輪の花火)	Koichiro Hayama	Tatsuhito Higuchi	August 18, 2024
26	"Secrets of the Universe"; Transliteration: "Uchū no Himitsu" (Japanese: 宇宙の秘密)	Shojiro Nakazawa	Atsuhiro Tomioka	August 25, 2024
27	"Not an Easy Choice"; Transliteration: "Amakunai Sentaku" (Japanese: 甘くない選択)	Shojiro Nakazawa	Atsuhiro Tomioka	September 1, 2024
28	"Shaking Off the Light"; Transliteration: "Hikari o Furikitte" (Japanese: 光を振り切って)	Katsuya Watanabe	Atsuhiro Tomioka	September 8, 2024
29	"Spy and Family"; Transliteration: "Supai to Famirī" (Japanese: スパイとファミリー)	Katsuya Watanabe	Atsuhiro Tomioka	September 15, 2024
30	"The Rampage Is Mine"; Transliteration: "Bōsō wa Ore no Mono" (Japanese: 暴走は俺の物)	Noboru Takemoto	Hiroshi Yamaguchi	September 22, 2024
31	"A Magnificent Challenge"; Transliteration: "Karei naru Chōsen" (Japanese: 華麗なる挑戦)	Noboru Takemoto	Kenji Konuta	September 29, 2024
32	"Hell's Train"; Transliteration: "Jigoku no Densha-gokko" (Japanese: 地獄の電車ごっこ)	Shojiro Nakazawa	Natsumi Morichi	October 6, 2024
33	"The Procurer Won't Give In"; Transliteration: "Chōtatsuya wa Yuzuranai" (Japanese: 調達屋は譲らない)	Shojiro Nakazawa	Tatsuto Higuchi	October 13, 2024
34	"Cars That Carry Dreams"; Transliteration: "Yume wo Hakobu Kuruma" (Japanese: 夢を運ぶクルマ)	Katsuya Watanabe	Atsuhiro Tomioka	October 20, 2024
35	"Blue Champion"; Transliteration: "Aoki Ōja" (Japanese: 碧き王者)	Katsuya Watanabe	Atsuhiro Tomioka	October 27, 2024
36	"The Road to Dreams"; Transliteration: "Yume e to Hashiru Michi" (Japanese: 夢へと走る道)	Katsuya Watanabe	Atsuhiro Tomioka	November 10, 2024
37	"Two Spies"; Transliteration: "Futari no Supai" (Japanese: 二人のスパイ)	Koichiro Hayama	Atsuhiro Tomioka	November 17, 2024
38	"Vow of the Underlings"; Transliteration: "Sanshita no Chikai" (Japanese: 三下の誓い)	Koichiro Hayama	Tatsuto Higuchi	November 24, 2024
39	"Screaming Planet"; Transliteration: "Himei no Hoshi" (Japanese: 悲鳴の星)	Shojiro Nakazawa	Atsuhiro Tomioka	December 1, 2024
40	"The Immeasurable Man"; Transliteration: "Hakarenai Otoko" (Japanese: はかれない男)	Shojiro Nakazawa	Natsumi Morichi	December 8, 2024
41	"A Supportive Back"; Transliteration: "Azukeru Senaka" (Japanese: 預ける背中)	Hiroyuki Katō	Tatsuto Higuchi	December 15, 2024
42	"Holy Night Presents"; Transliteration: "Sei naru Yoru no Purezento" (Japanese: 聖なる夜の届け物(プレゼント))	Hiroyuki Katō	Chinatsu Hojo	December 22, 2024
43	"Powerful Handle"; Transliteration: "Gōkai na Handoru" (Japanese: 豪快なハンドル)	Shojiro Nakazawa	Atsuhiro Tomioka	January 5, 2025
44	"The Courier Doesn't Arrive"; Transliteration: "Todokeya ga Todokanai" (Japanese: 届け屋が届かない)	Shun Miyazaki	Atsuhiro Tomioka	January 12, 2025
45	"Enemies of the Earth"; Transliteration: "Chikyū no Teki" (Japanese: 地球の敵)	Koichiro Hayama	Atsuhiro Tomioka	January 19, 2025
46	"The Future Is in Your Hands"; Transliteration: "Mirai o Kono Te ni" (Japanese: 未来をこの手に)	Koichiro Hayama	Atsuhiro Tomioka	January 26, 2025
47	"There Is More Than One Courier"; Transliteration: "Todokeya wa Hitori ja Nai" (Japanese: 届け屋はひとりじゃない)	Shojiro Nakazawa	Atsuhiro Tomioka	February 2, 2025
48 (Final)	"Your Handle"; Transliteration: "Kimi no Handoru" (Japanese: 君のハンドル)	Shojiro Nakazawa	Atsuhiro Tomioka	February 9, 2025

== Films & Specials ==
=== Theatrical ===
==== Promise the Circuit ====
Bakuage Sentai Boonboomger: GekijōBoon! Promise the Circuit (爆上戦隊ブンブンジャー 劇場BOON！ プロミス・ザ・サーキット, Bakuage Sentai Bunbunjā Gekijōbūn! Puromisu Za Sākitto) is a film released in Japanese theaters on July 26, 2024, double-billed with Kamen Rider Gotchard: The Future Daybreak. (Note: It is not revealed where in the series timeline the events of the film take place, but Sakito and Byun as the Boonboomgers' allies and the absence of Bun Red 119 and his mecha make it likely that the film takes place at some point between episodes 18 and 21 of the series.)

=== V-Cinema ===
==== Boonboomger vs. King-Ohger ====
Bakuage Sentai Boonboomger vs. King-Ohger (爆上戦隊ブンブンジャーVSキングオージャー, Bakuage Sentai Bunbunjā Tai Kinguōjā) is a V-Cinema release that features a crossover between Boonboomger and Ohsama Sentai King-Ohger. The V-Cinema received a limited theatrical release on May 1, 2025, followed by its DVD and Blu-ray release on October 29, 2025. The events of the V-Cinema take place after the final episode of the series.

==== Gozyuger vs. Boonboomger ====
No.1 Sentai Gozyuger vs. Boonboomger (ナンバーワン戦隊ゴジュウジャーVSブンブンジャー, Nanbā Wan Sentai Gojūjā Tai Bunbunjā) is a V-Cinema release that features a crossover between Boonboomger and No.1 Sentai Gozyuger. The V-Cinema received a limited theatrical release on March 20, 2026, followed by its DVD and Blu-ray release on July 29, 2026. The events of the film take place after the end of the series. Masaki Nakao, Ryota Ozawa, and Mitsuomi Takahashi will reprise their respective roles as Yamato Kazakiri/Zyuoh Eagle from Doubutsu Sentai Zyuohger, Captain Marvelous/Gokai Red from Kaizoku Sentai Gokaiger, and Satoru Akashi/Bouken Red from GoGo Sentai Boukenger.

=== Special episode ===
Bakuage Sentai Boonboomger Formation Lap: Settler of Galaxy (爆上戦隊ブンブンジャー formation lap 始末屋 オブ ギャラクシー, Bakuage Sentai Bunbunjā Fōmēshon Rappu Shimatsuya Obu Gyarakushī) is a web-exclusive crossover special released on Toei Tokusatsu Fan Club on July 13, 2025. Masashi Ikeda, Hiroshi Kamiya, Keisuke Minami, Atsuki Mashiko, Hinami Mori, Hidenori Tokuyama, and Yumi Sugimoto reprised their respective roles as Jeramie Brasieri from Ohsama Sentai King-Ohger, Shou Ronpo and Tsurugi Ohtori from Uchu Sentai Kyuranger, Zocks Goldtsuiker and Flint Goldtsuiker from Kikai Sentai Zenkaiger, and Hiroto Sutō and Miu Sutō from Engine Sentai Go-onger while Raizou Ishikawa reprised their respective voice roles as Don Doragoku from Avataro Sentai Donbrothers. The events of the special take place before and during episode 16 of the series.

== Manga ==
- Bakuage Sentai Boonboomger Formation Lap: Your-Eyes-Only of the Informer (爆上戦隊ブンブンジャー formation lap 情報屋の秘密(ユア・アイズ・オンリー), Bakuage Sentai Bunbunjā Fōmēshon Rappu Jōhōya no Yua Aizu Onrī): A manga released on Toei Tokusatsu Fan Club on October 27, 2024. The events of the manga take place before episode 1 of the series and shows how Taiya and Ishiro first met.
- Bakuage Sentai Boonboomger Bonus Lap: Return of the Young Boss (爆上戦隊ブンブンジャー bonus lap 調達屋の帰還(リターン・オブ・ザ・若旦那), Bakuage Sentai Bunbunjā Bōnasu Rappu Ritān Obu Za Wakadan'na): A manga released on Toei Tokusatsu Fan Club on January 18, 2026. The events of the manga take place after the final episode of the series and shows Genba returning to his home planet with the Boonboomgers in order to liberate it from Hashiriyan's control.

== Cast ==
- Taiya Hando (範道 大也, Handō Taiya): Haruhi Iuchi (井内 悠陽, Iuchi Haruhi)
- Ishiro Meita (鳴田 射士郎, Meita Ishirō): Yuki Hayama (葉山 侑樹, Hayama Yūki)
- Mira Shifuto (志布戸 未来, Shifuto Mira): Miu Suzuki (鈴木 美羽, Suzuki Miu)
- Jyo Akuse (阿久瀬 錠, Akuse Jō): Ryu Saito (齋藤 璃佑, Saitō Ryū)
- Genba Bureki (振騎 玄蕃, Bureki Genba): Satoru Soma (相馬 理, Sōma Satoru)
- Sakito Homura (焔 先斗, Homura Sakito): Yu Miyazawa (宮澤 佑, Miyazawa Yū)
- Shirabe Saibu (細武 調, Saibu Shirabe): Hashiyasume Atsuko (ハシヤスメ・アツコ, Hashiyasume Atsuko)
- Raita Naito (内藤 雷汰, Naitō Raita): Katsuhiko Nagato (長戸 勝彦, Nagato Katsuhiko)
- Eiichiro Tokoyari (常槍 鋭一郎, Tokoyari Eiichirō): Keisuke Horibe (堀部 圭亮, Horibe Keisuke)
- Maimi Baisu (梅栖 舞美, Baisu Maimi): Reika Sakurai (桜井 玲香, Sakurai Reika)

=== Voice cast ===
- Bundorio Bunderas (ブンドリオ・ブンデラス, Bundorio Bunderasu), Boonboomger Equipment, Shiho Sato (佐藤 詩捕, Satō Shiho; 41): Rica Matsumoto (松本 梨香, Matsumoto Rika)
- Byun Diesel (ビュン・ディーゼル, Byun Dīzeru), Boonboom Controller (ブンブンコントローラー, Bunbun Kontorōrā): Natsuki Hanae (花江 夏樹, Hanae Natsuki)
- Decotrade (デコトラーデ, Dekotorāde): Junichi Suwabe (諏訪部 順一, Suwabe Jun'ichi)
- Itasha (イターシャ, Itāsha), Sara (セーラ, Sēra; 42), Lavinia (ラビニア, Rabinia; 42): Nana Mizuki (水樹 奈々, Mizuki Nana)
- Yaiyai Yarucar (ヤイヤイ・ヤルカー, Yaiyai Yarukā): Sumire Morohoshi (諸星 すみれ, Morohoshi Sumire)
- Madrex (マッドレックス, Maddorekkusu), Hashiriken (ハシリ犬): Hiroshi Kamiya (神谷 浩史, Kamiya Hiroshi)
- Cannonborg (キャノンボーグ, Kyanonbōgu): Kujira (くじら)
- Disrace (ディスレース, Disurēsu): Showtaro Morikubo (森久保 祥太郎, Morikubo Shōtarō)
- Waruido Spindo (ワルイド・スピンドー, Waruido Supindō), Shaishai Sarucar (シャイシャイ・サルカー, Shaishai Sarukā): Koji Yusa (遊佐 浩二, Yusa Kōji)
- Grantu Risk (グランツ・リスク, Gurantsu Risuku): Tsutomu Isobe (磯部 勉, Isobe Tsutomu)
- Zoonzoom Shoka Blaster (ズンズンショウカブラスター, Zunzun Shōka Burasutā): Masaaki Endoh (遠藤 正明, Endō Masaaki)

=== Guest cast ===
- Muscular man (6, 17): Hayate Kajihara (梶原 颯, Kajihara Hayate)
- Sōsuke Esumi (江角 走輔, Esumi Sōsuke; 12): Yasuhisa Furuhara (古原 靖久, Furuhara Yasuhisa)
- Engine Speedor (炎神スピードル, Enjin Supīdoru; Voice; 12, 38): Daisuke Namikawa (浪川 大輔, Namikawa Daisuke)
- Engine Bus-on (炎神バスオン, Enjin Basuon; Voice; 12): Hisao Egawa (江川 央生, Egawa Hisao)
- Engine BearRV (炎神ベアールV, Enjin Beārubui; Voice; 12): Miki Inoue (井上 美紀, Inoue Miki)
- President (16): Doronz Ishimoto (ドロンズ石本, Doronzu Ishimoto)
- Woman (19): Mizuho Hata (秦 瑞穂, Hata Mizuho)
- Man (19): Kei Kagaya (加賀谷 圭, Kagaya Kei)
- Mahiro Kamishige (上重 まひろ, Kamishige Mahiro; 24, 37): Arisa Matsunaga (松永 有紗, Matsunaga Arisa)
- Manga artist (27): Kazuhiko Shimamoto (島本 和彦, Shimamoto Kazuhiko)
- Reika Edogawa (江戸川 レイカ, Edogawa Reika; 31): Kaoru Hirata (平田 薫, Hirata Kaoru)
- Right (ライト, Raito; 32): Jun Shison (志尊 淳, Shison Jun)
- Akira Nijino (虹野 明, Nijino Akira; 32): Shin Nagahama (長濱 慎, Nagahama Shin)
- Ticket (チケット, Chiketto; Voice; 32), ToQ Changer (トッキュウチェンジャー, Tokkyū Chenjā; 32): Kappei Yamaguchi (山口 勝平, Yamaguchi Kappei)
- Aki Nogi (野木 秋, Nogi Aki; 36): Hinami Mori (森 日菜美, Mori Hinami)
- Store manager (36): Kohtaro Taki (滝 晃太朗, Taki Kōtarō)
- Stir (ステア, Sutea; 37): Konomi Naito (内藤 好美, Naitō Konomi)
- Weiwei Yarucar (ウェイウェイ・ヤルカー, Weiwei Yarukā; Voice; 38): Kengo Kawanishi (河西 健吾, Kawanishi Kengo)
- Jyo's father (40): Noboru Kaneko (金子 昇, Kaneko Noboru)
- Chairman (41): Hiroto Yoshimitsu (吉満 寛人, Yoshimitsu Hiroto)
- Vice chairman (41): Jubun Fukuzawa (福澤 重文, Fukuzawa Jūbun)
- Joe Gibken (ジョー・ギブケン, Jō Gibuken; 43): Yuki Yamada (山田 裕貴, Yamada Yūki)

Mobilates (モバイレーツ, Mobairētsu; 43): Tomokazu Seki (関 智一, Seki Tomokazu)

== Songs ==
Opening theme

- "Bakuage Sentai Boonboomger" (爆上戦隊ブンブンジャー, Bakuage Sentai Bunbunjā)
  - Lyrics & Composition: Masahiro Takeda (武田 将弥, Takeda Masahiro)
  - Arrangement: Yusuke Shirato (白戸 佑輔, Shirato Yūsuke)
  - Artist: Masaaki Endoh

Ending theme

- "Kotsukotsu-Pon-Pon" (コツコツ-PON-PON)
  - Lyrics, Composition, & Arrangement: Kentaro Sonoda (園田 健太郎, Sonoda Kentarō)
  - Artist: Bundorio Bunderas (Rica Matsumoto)
