= List of Ohsama Sentai King-Ohger episodes =

This is a list of episodes for Ohsama Sentai King-Ohger, a Japanese tokusatsu television drama. It is the fourth series in the franchise released in Japan's Reiwa Era and the 47th entry of Toei's long-running Super Sentai series produced by TV Asahi.

== Episodes ==
No.	English title Original Japanese title	Directed by	Written by	Original release date
1	"I Am King"; Transliteration: "Ware wa Ō nari" (Japanese: 我は王なり)	Kazuya Kamihoriuchi	Minato Takano	March 5, 2023
Two millennia since their last attempt, the Underground Empire Bug Naraku returns, intending to conquer the world. To fight the invasion, the rulers of the five great nations, Shugodom, Nkosopa, Ishabana, Gokkan, and Tofu gather at Shugodom's capital to establish an alliance, but the king of Shugodom, Rcules Husty, reveals his plot to conquer their kingdoms. Confronting Rcules for his transgressions, an orphan named Gira steals his sacred sword and uses it to lead the kingdoms' guardian deities, the Shugods, in repelling the invaders.
2	"A King for Whose Sake"; Transliteration: "Taga Tame no Ō" (Japanese: 誰がための王)	Kazuya Kamihoriuchi	Minato Takano	March 12, 2023
For defying Rcules, Gira becomes a wanted man pursued by Shugodom's soldiers. However, the president of Nkosopa, Yanma Gast, arrives to rescue him. In response, Rcules demands Yanma to surrender Gira to him and apologize. Just then, Bug Naraku's emperor, Dezunaraku VIII, appears and threatens to invade Nkosopa.
3	"To Willfully Devote"; Transliteration: "Wagamama o Sasagu" (Japanese: 我がままを捧ぐ)	Kazuya Kamihoriuchi	Minato Takano	March 19, 2023
After defending Nkosopa from Bug Naraku's attack and refusing to submit to Shugodom's demands, Gira and Yanma are kidnapped by the queen of Ishabana, Hymeno Ran, who demands Gira to surrender God Kuwagata to her. Upon witnessing her selfish and demanding behavior, Gira and Yanma are disappointed until they see why her people love her in spite of it amidst another Bug Naraku attack. Unbeknownst to the trio, Rita Kaniska, the sovereign of Gokkan, is spying on them.
4	"A Lordly Reception"; Transliteration: "Tono no Omotenashi" (Japanese: 殿のオモテなし)	Kazuya Kamihoriuchi	Minato Takano	March 26, 2023
Gira, Yanma, and Hymeno are surprised by the arrival of Kaguragi Dybowski, the lord of Tofu, riding God Kabuto with orders from Rcules to arrest Gira by any means necessary. Meanwhile, Rcules sends Rita to assist in Gira's capture. Before they do so, Rita investigates Shugodom's records. Concurrently, Yanma recalls his previous work with Rcules two years prior.
5	"The King of Winter Is Coming"; Transliteration: "Fuyu no Ō Kitaru" (Japanese: 冬の王来たる)	Kazuya Kamihoriuchi	Minato Takano	April 2, 2023
After being ambushed by Rita and Kaguragi on Rcules' orders, Gira is imprisoned at Gokkan, where he is to be judged for treason. Meanwhile, Rita continues their investigation into Gira's past and discovers his true origins.
6	"Return of the Prince"; Transliteration: "Ōji no Kikan" (Japanese: 王子の帰還)	Kyohei Yamaguchi	Minato Takano	April 9, 2023
Now aware of his identity, Gira returns to Shugodom with plans to overthrow his brother Rcules, but he and the other monarchs are surprised by Bug Naraku, who have taken possession of God Scorpion, one of the sacred treasures, and threatens the five kingdoms with massive bombs buried beneath them.
7	"Wrath of God"; Transliteration: "Kami no Ikari" (Japanese: 神の怒り)	Kyohei Yamaguchi	Minato Takano	April 16, 2023
King-Ohger is out of commission after being attacked by God Scorpion. As Hymeno and Yanma work to repair the Shugods, Bug Naraku takes advantage of the situation by launching another attack. Meanwhile, Hymeno recalls the Wrath of God incident, wherein a mysterious assassin controlling a green cicada-themed Shugod assassinated her parents fifteen years ago.
8	"King and Prince in Trial by Combat"; Transliteration: "Ō to Ōji no Kettō Saiban" (Japanese: 王と王子の決闘裁判)	Kyohei Yamaguchi	Minato Takano	April 23, 2023
Watched by the other monarchs, Gira and Rcules decide to settle their rivalry in a duel to the death. In a turn of events however, Rcules reveals his own evil version of the Ohger Caliber to become Ohkuwagata Ohger as a means of defeating Gira.
9	"Gira on the Run"; Transliteration: "Gira Tōsōchū" (Japanese: ギラ逃走中)	Hiroyuki Katō	Minato Takano	April 30, 2023
Gira is defeated by Rcules, but he is rescued by the other four monarchs, who intend to make use of his ability to control King-Ohger. However, none of them trust each other, which begins a dispute over who gets to take custody of Gira. Meanwhile, Dezunaraku VIII takes the initiative and confronts the four monarchs in person.
10	"The Fabled Guardian Deity"; Transliteration: "Densetsu no Shugoshin" (Japanese: 伝説の守護神)	Hiroyuki Katō	Minato Takano	May 7, 2023
Dezunaraku VIII has captured Gira. Yanma, Hymeno, Rita, and Kaguragi race against time to rescue him and bring forth the legendary guardian deity, Legend King-Ohger, in a desperate move to save their kingdoms from destruction.
11	"Eerie! The Man in the Spider Mask"; Transliteration: "Kaiki! Kumo Kamen no Otoko" (Japanese: 怪奇！クモ仮面の男)	Hiroyuki Katō	Minato Takano	May 14, 2023
Rcules takes the credit for Gira and the other monarchs' efforts in saving the world from Bug Naraku and holds a funeral for Gira, who is considered officially dead. Gira sneaks into the casket as part of a plan to overthrow Rcules, only for the memorial to be disrupted by a mysterious spider-masked warrior in white robes, who steals the casket while mocking Rcules for stealing credit along with a warning that he will be despised once his true colors are revealed. The masked man also averts a Bug Naraku scheme to destroy Legend King-Ohger, revealing that he played both sides from the beginning to acquire the Three Great Guardian Deities' Shugod Souls. He uses them to remove the seal on his mask and transform it into his dagger before easily dispatching Dezunaraku VIII. He then introduces himself to the confused monarchs as Chikyu's absolute ruler: Jeramie Brasieri.
12	"The Sixth King"; Transliteration: "Roku-ninme no Ōsama" (Japanese: 6人目の王様)	Kazuya Kamihoriuchi	Minato Takano	May 21, 2023
Gira, the four monarchs and even Dezunaraku VIII get confused when the masked man introduces himself as Jeramie Brasieri and affirming himself as ruler of all Chikyu. Jeramie also reveals to be a mentor of Yanma's teacher, Gin, and invested in stopping Rcules, as he warns Gira of his brother's intentions, while revealing his true origin to the current Ohsama Sentai as the half-Bug Naraku son of the forgotten sixth Ohsama Sentai hero and a former member of Bug Naraku, Nephila, who was born at Gokkan. Because Jeramie's parents' relationships were forbidden during that time, their names had been written off from the original history, and the iron mask which originally a transformation dagger Kumonoslayer were used to keep Jeramie's identity hidden and sealed his Bug Naraku power.
13	"The Angry Spider"; Transliteration: "Ikari no Supaidā" (Japanese: 怒りのスパイダー)	Kazuyuki Chatani	Minato Takano	May 28, 2023
Yanma recalls how he rebuilt Nkosopa from its previous destruction in the Wrath of God incident. As Gira and Hymeno search for the Three Great Guardian Deities, Jeramie decides to get an "interesting story" out of Yanma by loaning the president his Venomix Shooter. But the firearm is revealed to be a memento of his mother when Jeramie takes offense at Yanma using the Venomix Shooter to pull a prank on Rcules. Things very quickly go sideways when the Kaijim Geroujim attacks, with Jeramie taking matters into his own hands by subduing the monarchs and then summoning his own Shugod, God Tarantula, who controls other Shugods while defeating Bug Naraku forces. However, he spares Geroujim while taking the Ohger Caliburs.
14	"Together With Moffun"; Transliteration: "Moffun to Issho" (Japanese: もっふんといっしょ)	Kyohei Yamaguchi	Minato Takano	June 4, 2023
Hymeno recognizes Guardian Cicada, who was being manipulated by God Tarantula, is the same type of Shugod that was present at the time of her parents' murder. She accuses Jeramie for causing the Wrath of God incident and decides to fight him after she mistook his nonchalant and cryptic response as an admittance of guilt. Meanwhile, Rita learns their favorite anime series mascot, Moffun, was produced by Ishabana, and learns from their investigation that the series was created to help Hymeno cope with her parents' death. Rita and Morphonia also force Jeramie to be straight with Hymeno and reveal that he was actually hibernating during Wrath of God incident, Hymeno accepting Jeramie's apology after enlisting him into helping her protect her kingdom as his penitence.
15	"A Visit to Suzume"; Transliteration: "Suzume ni Omimai" (Japanese: スズメにお見舞い)	Kyohei Yamaguchi	Minato Takano	June 11, 2023
Gira decides to infiltrate Rcules' castle in order to rescue Kaguragi's sister, Suzume, and Kuroda explains on how Kaguragi usurped the throne during the Wrath of God incident. Unfortunately, to everyone's dismay, Suzume claims to have fallen for Rcules during her stay in Shugodom, or so everyone thought. In the end, Rcules approaches Dezunaraku VIII about what appears to be negotiating peace between humankind and Bug Naraku.
16	"The 10-Year-Old Chief Justice"; Transliteration: "Jussai no Saibanchō" (Japanese: 10才の裁判長)	Kyohei Yamaguchi	Minato Takano	June 18, 2023
Rita finally discovers the truth about the Wrath of God incident that made them and Hymeno become monarchs 15 years ago after their predecessors were killed. Rita became a monarch at age 10 shortly after the presumed death of their predecessor, Queen Karlas Dehaan, who was suspected to be killed by her husband, Doctor Siron. In the present, during his re-trial, Siron explains Rita that he was tasked by his wife to fake her death and willingly to became a scapegoat for her "murder" to preserve Gokkan's neutrality while Karlas seeks out the whereabouts of the true culprit behind the Wrath of God incident. Meanwhile, Rcules and Dezunaraku VIII reached an accord that does not bode well for the Ohsama Sentai and their world, including Jeremy.
17	"The King Does Not Flee"; Transliteration: "Ō wa Nigenai" (Japanese: 王は逃げない)	Hiroyuki Katō	Minato Takano	June 25, 2023
Rcules decided to join forces with Dezunaraku VIII so they conquer Chikyu together, resurrecting the Bug Naraku general Daigorg to spearhead the invasion of Nkosopa. Yanma's confronts Rcules and Daigorg while having his citizens evacuate the kingdom with Gira kept from interfering as the other rulers aid Yanma. Upon learning the truth from his loyal spy, Geroujim, Jeramie, furious that Rcules perverted his vision of humans and Bug Naraku working together, attempts to take control of all the Shugods and forms an unstable combination of Legend King-Ohger and Tarantula Knight that is quickly defeated by God Kuwagata Zero. However, Gira intervenes at the last second to save Yanma from being executed, while Rita can finally commence Rcules' arrest thanks to Jeramie's testimony.
18	"The Crown of Beginnings"; Transliteration: "Hajimari no Ōkan" (Japanese: 始まりの王冠)	Hiroyuki Katō	Minato Takano	July 2, 2023
With Gira's survival now known to all the Shugodom's citizens after rescuing Yanma from being killed by Daigorg, Rcules decides to hold another duel to settle things between them. This time, Rcules intends use a relic known as the Founder's Crown and the Ohger Lance to assure himself as the decisive victor. With the Dybowski siblings finally making their move to aid their true allies, they preserve the crown and lance to Gira and the duel erupts into an all-out battle where he ultimately reigns supreme over Shugodom's throne.
19	"Ohsama Sentai King-Ohger"; Transliteration: "Ōsama Sentai Kinguōjā" (Japanese: 王様戦隊キングオージャー)	Hiroyuki Katō	Minato Takano	July 9, 2023
With Rcules losing the rights to be a king after Gira and Kaguragi defeated him, he is also too late to learn that Bug Naraku betrayed him, just like he did to his own people and the four other kingdoms. However, with Jeramie officially becoming a member of the Ohsama Sentai, Gira leads the team to prevent the Bug Naraku's hostile takeover on Shugodom from being finalized, and commencing Rcules' arrest for his crimes. Unfortunately, an attempted arrest on Rcules cannot be legalized, thanks to Yanma's immediate prank on the corrupt king.
20	"Duel of Kings"; Transliteration: "Ō to Ō no Kettō" (Japanese: 王と王の決闘)	Kyohei Yamaguchi	Minato Takano	July 16, 2023
After driving the Bug Naraku away from his kingdom, because Yanma's attempted prank ruined a legal arrest on Rcules, Gira challenges his older brother to another trial by combat to decide who among them is the true king of Shugodom. Suspecting that Rcules would cheat once again in attempt to steal the Ohger Lance from Gira, Kaguragi and Jeramie swap them with the fake, to ensure Gira achieve his victory and preserve the crown, while also successfully expose Rcules' crimes to the public. Much to everyone, including Rcules' surprises, however, they also learn that Bug Naraku Prime Minister Kamejim killed the real Bocimar and had been impersonating his appearance to infiltrate Shugodom for years. With Kamejim's past infiltration at Shugodom exposed, it also simultaneously tarnishes Rcules' reputation even more, thereby signaling Gira's victory.
21	"Push Forward on the High Road"; Transliteration: "Tsukisusume Ōdō o" (Japanese: 突き進め王道を)	Kyohei Yamaguchi	Minato Takano	July 23, 2023
Despite his victory against Rcules, Gira is unprepared and nervous to rule Shugodom during his first day as a king. In response, the four monarchs and Jeramie decide to put Gira through a series of tests for him to prove his worth as a king. During a same meeting, Jeramie also explains how the original five heroes divided and built their own kingdoms sometimes after his father, the original sixth hero was cast away in the past, starting from Gira and Rcules' ancestor, Lainior. Concurrently, ever since Rcules' crimes and Bocimar's death became known to the public, Duga initially resigned from his service as a knight of Shugodom and looked for a new job across the four other kingdoms to atone for his past mistakes, until Gira hires him back and forgives him.
22	"Great Gathering of Shugods"; Transliteration: "Shugoddo Daishūgō" (Japanese: シュゴッド大集合)	Kazuyuki Chatani	Minato Takano	July 30, 2023
Daigorg consumes the Shugod Souls of God Tarantula and the Guardian Weapons to become massive and easily defeats King-Ohger. While the monster rests and gathers energy to destroy Shugodom, Kaguragi reveals from the time during Gira and Rcules' last duel that Caucasus Kabuto Castle is actually a giant robot. While the other monarchs and Jeramie fight to repel another monster, Gira learns how to activate it.
23	"Shugodom's Moving Castle"; Transliteration: "Shugoddamu no Ugoku Shiro" (Japanese: シュゴッダムの動く城)	Kazuyuki Chatani	Minato Takano	August 6, 2023
The Ohsama Sentai race against time to make Caucasus Kabuto Castle operational before Daigorg destroys Shugodom. With help of all the citizens, Gira manages to activate the castle, converting it into the massive robot King Caucasus Kabuto and destroys Daigorg. Afterwards, Gira is acknowledged by the people of Shugodom and officially crowned their new king.
24	"King of the In-Between vs. King of the Abyss"; Transliteration: "Hazama no Ō Tai Naraku no Ō" (Japanese: 狭間の王VS奈落の王)	Hiroyuki Katō	Minato Takano	August 13, 2023
Several days after the Ohsama Sentai's venture at the land of the dead, Hakabaka, an unexpected heat wave suddenly blasts over Chikyu. As a result, the monarchs decide to hold a summer festival at Shugodom, where they also participate. Meanwhile, Jeramie and Geroujim confront Dezunaraku at Bug Naraku's base to confirm the latter's connection with the heat wave brought upon Chikyu and learn of his scheme to enter the planet's core to destroy everything in an act of mutually assured destruction. Dezunaraku also reveals that Jeramie's fabricated prophecies are the reason that the Bug Naraku suffered racial persecution by humans before they could not take anymore. Jeramie, revealing his full name, is unable to talk Dezunaraku out of his plan as he jumps into the core.
25	"War of the Kings and the People"; Transliteration: "Ō to Tami no Tatakai" (Japanese: 王と民の戦い)	Hiroyuki Katō	Minato Takano	August 20, 2023
Dezunaraku VIII enacts his suicidal plan to destroy all of Chikyu. To stop him, the Ohsama Sentai and their allies unite to defend their world and pilot King-Ohger together, combining all the Shugods with Caucasus Kabuto Castle to form God King-Ohger and force Dezunaraku out of the core.
26	"Birth of a New Kingdom"; Transliteration: "Shin Ōkoku no Tanjō" (Japanese: 新王国の誕生)	Hiroyuki Katō	Minato Takano	August 27, 2023
After stopping Dezunaraku VIII's plan to destroy the entire planet, Jeramie challenges him to a duel for leadership of Bug Naraku to end the 2000-year conflict with mankind. Through Jeramie overpowers him, Dezunaraku has a change of heart when Gira formally apologizes for what his people did to the Bug Naraku. But Dezunaraku is suddenly stabbed by Kamejim with a large falling bolt, revealing himself as the mastermind behind the ancient conflict and played both sides, with the Bug Naraku king obliterated by a lightning above him. Kamejim escapes after the monarchs overpower him. Soon after, Jeramie becomes the Bug Naraku king and establishes a sixth kingdom of Chikyu to realize his dream of uniting humanity and the Bug Naraku. During a silent night at a Shugodom site where Dezunaraku died, his now masterless Shugod familiar, Tarantula Abyss pays a final respect to its deceased master before parting to unknown.
27	"Arrival of the Galactinsect King"; Transliteration: "Uchūō no Tōrai" (Japanese: 宇蟲王の到来)	Kazuya Kamihoriuchi	Minato Takano	September 3, 2023
Two years have passed since the end of the Chikyu war. Kamejim attacks Bug Naraku and Geroujim flees to look for help. Gira holds a peace conference at Shugodom, but only the retainers of the four other countries appear because their masters are unavailable at the moment, when the Galactinsect King Dagded Dujardin descends and while he sends his minions to attack the other nations, he reveals to Gira that he was the one who sent Kamejim to manipulate the Humans and Bug Naraku into war, intending to have both sides destroy each other and all life in Chikyu in the process for the sake of his amusement, as he did with countless other worlds in the past. Geroujim warns the other monarchs, who were imprisoned at Gokkan and they return to repel the invaders. Dagded brings a wounded Jeramie and offers Gira a chance to save humanity as long as he swears obedience and exterminates the Bug Naraku for him, but Gira decides to refuse from becoming the invaders' puppet, after learning what they did to his ancestors. The six kings then declare that they will resist the invaders together and Dagded retreats, affirming that their resistance is futile and will enjoy breaking them apart slowly. In the end, it is revealed that Yanma, Hymeno and Kaguragi were temporarily imprisoned in Gokkan due to some property damage caused by petty acts of selfishness, with Rita taking some paid leave and watch over them.
28	"Shuffle Kings!"; Transliteration: "Shaffuru Kingusu!" (Japanese: シャッフル・キングス！)	Kazuya Kamihoriuchi	Minato Takano	September 10, 2023
Dagded sends Goma to switch the monarchs' souls and bodies. While trying to find a way to return their respective bodies, the monarchs must run the countries they are in without their respective people knowing their situations carefully.
29	"Disqualified as King"; Transliteration: "Ōsama Shikkaku" (Japanese: 王様失格)	Kazuya Kamihoriuchi	Minato Takano	September 17, 2023
Although the monarchs were able to return to their respective bodies, they are too late to learn that the Galactinsect's body switching plan was just a distraction for one of its jesters, Hilbil to brainwash not the monarchs' respective retainers, but causing the people of the countries to turn against each other as well. In order to prevent the monarchs from resigning their roles and to stop the riots, Jeramie takes the blame for starting them. He fakes his defeat to the public, entrusting the other monarchs to solve this problem, and exiles himself while the remaining monarchs defeat Hilbil.
30	"Frozen Scales"; Transliteration: "Itetsuku Tenbin" (Japanese: 凍てつく天秤)	Shojiro Nakazawa	Minato Takano	September 24, 2023
Shiron's wife, Karras was revealed have sealed herself alongside the culprit who caused Wrath of God and happens to be Galactinsect's forgotten immortal nihilist necromancer, Grodi Leucodium for fifteen years to prevent his next havoc. The said technique which Karras used is a seal of ice, a forbidden spell passed throughout the Gokkan monarchs which can only be used as a last resort, at cost of freezing themselves, with Rita inherit it on their right eye by Karras before her departure. Two years later, when Shiron finally arrives at a site where Karras and Grodi are sealed, he is ambushed and assassinated by Kamejim and Minongan. Shortly, Kamejim also killed Karras after unsealing her and Grodi, so the necromancer can turn her into a mindless zombie. As his zombification process on Karras cause her forbidden spell nearly freezes him, Grodi ends up falling into Bug Naraku kingdom where Jeramie is visited by Gira. During Rita'a visit at Ishabana, they and Hymeno are attacked by Karras' corpse. However Karras briefly regains conscious when she recognizes Rita's eye before dying once again. As Grodi is apprehended by the Bug Naraku soldiers and being transported to Ishabana, Hymeno immediately recognizes him as her parents' killer, and alerts her people to evacuate the kingdom, and her fellow monarchs to aid her against the alien murderer from enacting second Wrath of God. As Rita attempts to use their forbidden spell to seal Grodi, Hymeno stops her best friend from sharing a same fate as a now deceased Karras. Suddenly, Jeramie's mother, Nephila, who he thought dead, somehow attacks everyone except her son.
31	"2000 Years of Love"; Transliteration: "Nisen-nen no Ai" (Japanese: 二千年の愛)	Shojiro Nakazawa	Minato Takano	October 1, 2023
Jeramie is briefly reluctant and confused when his mother, Nephila, who died in front of him while protecting him from Daigorg when he was a child, appears before him in the present. Jeramie then realizes that Grodi has revived Nephila as a zombie, whereupon he mercy kills her to free her from Grodi's machinations. Gira was unaware that his fellow monarchs secretly plan to trick Dagdged into confessing his conspiracies to the public of Chikyu, in order to clear Bug Naraku kingdom's reputations. Once his conspiracies becomes known, an infuriated Dagdged banishes the Ohsama Sentai to the world of Super Sentai.
32	"Encounter! Kyoryu!"; Transliteration: "Sōgū! Kyōryū!" (Japanese: 遭遇！キョウリュウ！)	Koichi Sakamoto	Kaori Kaneko (Note: Plot supervision by Minato Takano)	October 8, 2023
Banished to what they learn is Earth, the powerless Ohsama Sentai learn that Dagdged revived a vilianous group called the Deboth Army and helped them conquer the planet. They end up joining forces with the Zyuden Sentai Kyoryugers, who lost their ability to utilize Brave after their teammates Daigo Kiryu and Utsusemimaru went missing while their Zyudenryu partners being kidnapped. Only Gira retains his powers while everyone receives aid from a mysterious youth named Prince, Gira realizes the similarities between the Shugods and the Zyudenryu as he, Yanma, and God Kuwagata enable Prince to transform into King Kyoryu Red. Meanwhile, Jeramie learns from Ian Yorkland that his father and the humans from the ancient era of Chikyu originated from Earth.: This episode is the first part of a crossover special with Zyuden Sentai Kyoryuger, celebrating its 10th year anniversary.
33	"Shugo! King and Kyoryu!!"; Transliteration: "Shūgō! Kingu to Kyōryū!!" (Japanese: シューゴー！キングとキョウリュウ！！)	Koichi Sakamoto	Kaori Kaneko	October 15, 2023
The Ohsama Sentai and the Kyoryugers join forces against a new Deboth Army assembled by Dagded while trying to get their powers back and find their missing allies. Prince's identity is later revealed to be none other than the displaced future son of Daigo and Amy, Daigoro Kiryu, and Amy's current teammates are the only ones who secretly knows her relations with her future husband and son, much to her confusion.: This episode is the second and final part of a crossover special with Zyuden Sentai Kyoryuger, celebrating its 10th year anniversary.
34	"Shugo Mask Strikes Back"; Transliteration: "Shugo Kamen no Gyakushū" (Japanese: シュゴ仮面の逆襲)	Hiroyuki Katō	Minato Takano	October 22, 2023
The Ohsama Sentai, joined by Gabutyra in his Minitrya form, return to Chikyu to resume their fight with the Galactinsects. But while it was a week-long excursion on Earth for them, the monarchs learns they have been away from Chikyu for six months. Dagded used their absence to placed mysterious masked man named Shugo Mask as a puppet ruler, gainning the Shugodom citizens' approval by enriching them while turning mostly everyone on the monarchs. While Gira accepted the supposed peace Shugo Mask provided, he learned Shugodom's gained wealth came at the expense of the other kingdoms being violently subjugated by Dagded's Jesters. The monarchs confront Shugo Mask and learn he is Rcules, who has returned as Dagded's servant.
35	"Don't Cry, Slack-Jawed Tanuki"; Transliteration: "Nakuna Sukapon Tanuki" (Japanese: 泣くなスカポンタヌキ)	Hiroyuki Katō	Minato Takano	October 29, 2023
The Ohsama Sentai begin their campaign to liberate their kingdoms from the Galactinsects at Nkosopa, which is under Hilbil Lich's control, who uses Yanma's technology which contain the country's main servers to brainwash his people with headphones. Yanma recalled that his subordinates used to belong to a criminal group led by Suji before reforming them. Hymeno and Rita managed to reliberate their home countries off-screen, while Douga, who have decided to side with Gira than serving Rcules, is able to escape from Shugodom to Gokkan undetected by riding at God Tarantula's leg. In order to free his people, Yanma decides to reset Nkosopa servers while vowing to rebuild it to countermeasure Galactinsect's re-attempt to steal it.
36	"Hymeno's Matchmaking Strategy"; Transliteration: "Himeno no Omiai Daisakusen" (Japanese: ヒメノのお見合い大作戦)	Hiroyuki Katō	Minato Takano	November 12, 2023
Having reclaimed Ishabana off-screen, Hymeno somehow holds a matchmaking competition to see who gets to marry her, where a mysterious white haired man named Romane Dearborn, secretly Sebastian's true identity is competing. Although Kaguragi declines a participation to focus on scouting a compromised Tofu undetected. In reality, the real Hymeno is revealed to be captured alive and disguised by Kamejim while she was trying to save her people. Thankfully, Jeramie and Sebastian can see through Kamejim's disguise and save the participating monarchs from being assassinated in the false contest before the real Hymeno escapes by herself in time, and thereby restore the country. Sebastian and Hymeno also explains how they first met, with the former reveals his origin as the heir of a duke family, whose original beauty would cause trouble to their home country, and almost being driven to suicide before Hymeno helped him disguises his identity as an old butler.
37	"Iroki's Rebellion"; Transliteration: "Iroki no Ran" (Japanese: イロキの乱)	Kazuya Kamihoriuchi	Minato Takano	November 19, 2023
Having learn that Grodi has resurrected Iroki and turned Tofu back into a poverty state like the last time under her tyranny, Kaguragi recalls how he defeated her during the Wrath of God incident when he and his family were once humble farmers and the country's best, and only he who knew Iroki's true nature behind her villainous facade. As Iroki was not revealed to be a greedy tyrant everyone thought, until she discovered Grodi had been poisoning all of her country's food supplies to kill all of her people during Wrath of God incident. She pretended to have descent into villainy, by confiscating all food supplies Grodi poisoned and to save her people, and staged her death, where Kaguragi will come to make amends to return. Unfortunately, Kaguragi was too late to save Iroki from sacrificing herself of eating the poisonous food in her people's steads, just as she set the castle on fire where she was buried. Although Kaguragi was appointed as her successor, he was unable to initiate her order to execute her, and was forced to watch her being killed by Grodi's poison and her corpse being consumed by the castle's flame in horror. Nevertheless, since then, Kaguragi and his family kept Iroki's promise to cover the truth behind her death until Grodi's crime is exposed. As Iroki secretly retained her willpower when Grodi resurrected, but still connected to the Galactinsect necromancer's life force, she provokes Kaguragi's failure to execute her order in the past, allowing him to gain confidence to finish what he start. Thanks to Hymeno's tips that destroying Grodi's scythe makes him mortal, Kaguragi slays the perpetrator and presumably kills him, while Kuroko successfully eradicates food supplies Grodi poisoned and foils his repeated crime. With Grodi's presumed death, Iroki returns to afterlife peacefully.
38	"Steadfast Idol Debut"; Transliteration: "Fudō no Aidoru Debyū" (Japanese: 不動のアイドルデビュー)	Kazuya Kamihoriuchi	Minato Takano	November 26, 2023
The Galactinsects Goma and Minongan set up an idol singing contest at Gokkan. To everyone's surprise, Chief of Justice Rita happens to be one of the volunteered contestants, making the other monarchs worried on how their stoic teammate will win the contest. Rita also revealed that they wanted to become an idol, but unable to do due to their duty is in line, until recently while undercover to expose Goma's intention to bring Gokkan to chaos. Rita also confirmed that their parents are alive and well, and often visits them during a peaceful life. After exposing Galactinsect's intentions, and liberating Gokkan, Rita has a brief fight against Minongan, who learns his similarities with them.
39	"Nkosopa Showdown"; Transliteration: "Nkosopa Chōjō Kessen" (Japanese: ンコソパ頂上決戦)	Kazuya Kamihoriuchi	Minato Takano	December 3, 2023
As it turns out, Yanma previously created a backup supercomputer which Rita confiscated prior to the Galactinsects' invasion and acquires it to restore his kingdom. The plan involves the monarchs distracting the assembled Galactinsect Jesters for the backup to be installed, giving the Ohsama Sentai an upgrade to overpower the villains and force Hilbil to release her hold over Nkosopa before Goma sacrifices himself to protect her. However, it turns out Rcules orchestrated Goma's demise to replace him as new Jester, with Dagded having mixed feelings while allowing it. Yanma also suspects that Dagded may had been involve on the creations of Jeramie's arsenals and Rcules's Ohger Calibur ZERO.
40	"I Am King and Prince"; Transliteration: "Ware wa Ō de Ōji nari" (Japanese: 我は王で王子なり)	Hiroyuki Katō	Minato Takano	December 10, 2023
Gira is forced to deal with Rcules when he attacks Shugodom in his attempt to earn his spot in the Galactinsects by slaughtering everyone on Chikyu. The other monarchs unable to join him due to sustained injuries as a side effect of their upgrades. However, Daigoro arrives to help Gira while searching for Gabutyra, with them learning the truth that Gira was an artificial human clone created by Dagded, due to sharing not only an ability to communicate with the Shugods, but also the immortality as well. Dagded mind controls the Extreme King-Ohger to destroy Shugodom and uses the Ohsama Sentai as scapegoats, until the Shugods themselves breaks free of his control and inspired to remain to fight beside the Ohsama Sentai.
41	"Time to Save the Universe"; Transliteration: "Uchū o Sukū Toki" (Japanese: 宇宙を救う時)	Hiroyuki Katō	Minato Takano	December 17, 2023
Rcules challenges Gira for a final duel. Grodi also revealed to have resurrected Daigorg. Yanma is able to prevent the bomb from destroying the monarchs' thrones, despite a minor interference from Hilbil, who briefly brainwashed Shiokara. Kaguragi initially thought to have betray the Ohsama Sentai and purposely aids Rcules, only for Rcules to suddenly attack Dagded after convincing the being to imbue his sword with the power to kill gods so he can end Gira. Revealing that every thing he did was made possible by Dybowski siblings to eradicate the Galactinsects, Rcules tells Gira to stand up so they can save the universe together.
42	"The Secrets of King Rcules"; Transliteration: "Rakuresu-ō no Himitsu" (Japanese: ラクレス王の秘密)	Kazuyuki Chatani	Minato Takano	December 24, 2023
Landing a blow on Dagded, Rcules reveals he learned the existence of the Galactinsects when his father was murdered during the Wrath of God incident by Dagded. He decided to present himself as a tyrant to worm his way into Dagded's favor all while commissioning the creation of King-Ohger Zero and arranging Gira to be placed in an orphanage away from the Galactinsects' agents. But Rcules admits that Gira's return and the events that followed forced him to change his plans. Acknowledging Rcules as his brother, Gira helps his older brother put an end to Dagded.
43	"The Overlord's Deadly Sin"; Transliteration: "Haō no Taizai" (Japanese: 覇王の大罪)	Kazuyuki Chatani	Minato Takano	January 7, 2024
After recovering from his injuries, Rcules prepares to testify before Rita the dark truth behind Shugodom's dealing with Galactinsects and how he saved Gira from becoming the aliens' puppet king, confirming that Gira is indeed his brother by blood, and Gira's immediate birth caused by Dagded killed their mother. Rcules reveals that Wrath of God incident started when his dying father Caucus, the previous Ohkuwagata Ohger secretly implemented Kuwagata Shugod Soul inside a food which Gira ate as thebmeans to use him as a tool in attempt to coup against Dagded. However Causus' attempt is exposed, he and Bocimar sacrificed their lives protecting a young Gira from one of Dagded's jesters, allowing Rcules to buy times to fake Gira's death and pretend to pledge his loyalty to Dagded to stop Wrath of God incident. However, back in a present, outside the courtroom, the jesters regress the other monarchs to ten years old selves, though Kaguragi remains unchanged, while most civilians turn into elderly. It turns out that Minongan's body houses a clone of Dagded, his defeat jumpstarting his master's resurrection while aging his new body to adult form. In response, and shortly after Gira fully recover his memories, Rcules is spared from execution, in exchange to join Ohsama Sentai, as part of his rehabilitation to redeem himself.
44	"Proof of the Kings! The True Alliance of the Six Kingdoms"; Transliteration: "Ō no Akashi! Shin no Roku Ōkoku Dōmei" (Japanese: 王の証！真の六王国同盟)	Kazuyuki Chatani	Minato Takano	January 14, 2024
As part of his rehabilitation to dispose remaining Galactinsect jesters, in order to prevent Dagded's resurrection, Rcules starts with aiding Nkosopa kingdom, while revealing the power of six Kings' Proof within the Ohsama Sentai to end the aliens' evil schemes. Rcules warned Ohsama Sentai that relying on the power of Kings' Proof would drive the user insane, as demonstrated when Yanma recently almost about to destroy Shugodom and his home country, until Gira snaps him back to his senses. In contrast to Kaguragi, Gira's immunity against Hilbil's brainwashing was because of the effects of his birth caused by Dagded. As Jeramie manage to avoid Hilbil's brainwashing, he and Kaguragi plays dirty to free Rita and Hymeno from the jester's control. As Yanma, Hymeno, and Rita come back to their senses, the Ohsama Sentai forms a powered up King-Ohger against Hilbil's attacks and kill her.
45	"Heirs to the King"; Transliteration: "Ō o Tsugu Mono-tachi" (Japanese: 王を継ぐ者たち)	Hiroyuki Katō	Minato Takano	January 21, 2024
Though Hilbil has finally been destroyed, livid over being killed himself, a resurrected Dagded seeks to freeze Chikyu in its most doomed and desperate moment in order to add it to his "collection". Dagded sends Minongan to regress the mentalities of most citizens, including three Ohsama Sentai members Gira, Yanma and Hymeno into those of children. Rita's Ice Seal and Kaguragi's flame amulet are revealed to be one of the main source of their Kings' Proofs and both begin to learn combining their powers to avoid the detrimental side effects. At the same time, both Rita and Kaguragi decide to honor Morfonia and Suzume's long awaited wishes for their futures. Rita also reveals that Morfonia was born a daughter of escape artists in prison, which explains her skills in unlocking doors easily. With Rita and Kaguragi's combined Kings' Proofs to balance their power level without hurting themselves, they successfully freeze Minongan and remove Dagded's gambit from play.
46	"Know the Beauty of Life"; Transliteration: "Inochi no Utsukushisa o Shire" (Japanese: 命の美しさを知れ)	Hiroyuki Katō	Minato Takano	January 28, 2024
With Minongan has been sealed by combined efforts of both Rita and Kaguragi, Grodi is next with Hymeno awakening her life-draining King's Proof powers and learning that her enemy is actually undead. At the same time, Rcules tells Jeramie that his ancestor Lainior may have orchestrated the escape of Jeramie's to secure their son's King's Proof that is also the source of Jeramie's immortality. Hymeno, pondering the ethics of giving everyone immortality upon learning Jeramie's power, requests his aid to make Grodi is living being so she can avenge her parents' murderer. But Grodi, revealed to be another of Dagded's creations like Gira, only becomes more powerful and unstable once becoming a living being as he invokes another Wrath of God.
47	"Silence God"; Transliteration: "Kami o Damarasero" (Japanese: 神を黙らせろ)	Hiroyuki Katō	Minato Takano	February 4, 2024
Hymeno's plan to give Grodi true life backfires as he receives a power boost and unleashes another Wrath of God in his maddened state. Rcules joins the Ohsama Sentai to prevent the second Wrath of God and kill the now mortal necromancer with God King-Ohger. Although Grodi got his desire to die, he finds himself condemned to be eternally tormented by his victims at Hakabaka for his numerous crimes. Only Kamejim and Dagded remain, the latter revealing that Gira was meant to become a second Grodi through Caucus's attempted treachery and destroy Chikyu like Grodi had with the planet which the Bug Naraku originated from.
48	"Farewell, Dear People"; Transliteration: "Saraba, Shin'ai Naru Tami yo" (Japanese: さらば、親愛なる民よ)	Kazuya Kamihoriuchi	Minato Takano	February 11, 2024
Although Grodi has been disposed, Jeramie's King's Proof was sacrificed and the Ohsama Sentai need to create a replacement for their plan to power up God King-Ohger for a final battle with Dagded. But Dagded decides to personally clean Chikyu with the rulers ordering a mass exodus of the planet overseen by Rcules, securing their remaining Kings' Proofs to their retainers along with the Venomix Shooter. The Venomix Shooter plays a recording of the Ohsama Sentai telling their people to find a new world and finish their work. But the citizens refuse to accept the command with Rcules sharing their sentiment as they decides to aid their leaders. Kamejim, forced to discard his disguise as Goroge when the real one arrives, decides to take the Kings' Proofs before a ressurected Dezunaraku VIII appears.
49	"The King Is Here"; Transliteration: "Ō wa Koko ni Iru" (Japanese: 王はここにいる)	Kazuya Kamihoriuchi	Minato Takano	February 18, 2024
Chikyu's citizens return to aid their leaders against Dagded and his army of undead Bug Narak and Jester clones, receiving aid from Hakabaka's dead as the Ohsama Sentai's wounds are tended to. It is then that Lainior Husty, whom Dagded assumed to have obliterated earlier, arrives and clashes with the Galactinsect King. Lainior's words inspire the Ohsama Sentai with the solution for immorality, taking over the fight as the dead begin returning to Hakabaka.
50	"We Will Rule the World"; Transliteration: "Oresama-tachi ga Sekai o Shihai Suru" (Japanese: 俺様たちが世界を支配する)	Kazuya Kamihoriuchi	Minato Takano	February 25, 2024
Having recovered from their critical injuries while their allies battle Dagded's waning army, inspired by Lainior's words, the Ohsama Sentai gain a King's Proof replacement through their subjects so God King-Ohger can assume its ultimate formation to fight Dagded on even ground. Jeramie joins them after fending civilians from Kamejim, leaving him to be defeated by Rcules and Dezunaraku VIII with the latter dragging the Jester to Hakabaka and be tormented alongside Grodi. Both Dagded and God King-Ohger become galaxy-sized as they fight to a stand still before the latter sacrifices itself to weakened Dagded enough for the Ohsama Sentai to destroy him. Nevertheless, Yanma, now has his heart change about his views on Shugods assures Gira that he will rebuild them, as long as their Shugod Souls containing their memories remains. Unbeknownst to the Ohsama Sentai and their allies, they indirectly saved the missing Kyoryu Red of Kyoryugers, Daigo Kiryu, who was revealed to be captured by Dagded. Soon after, the borders between the kingdoms are lifted as citizens begin to rebuild their world, including Rcules during his community service at Gokkan while starting an actual relationship with Suzume. Though a plan to officially unify the kingdoms fails over naming rights, the six current monarchs' alliance remains steadfast as they prepare for any new threat looming on Chikyu.
