= Alisa Durbrow =

Japanese model, actress and singer

- アリサ・ダーブロウ
- Born: Alisa Yuriko Durbrow (アリサ・ユリコ・ダーブロウ, Arisa Yuriko Dāburō); April 16, 1988 (age 38); Saitama Prefecture, Japan
- Education: Horikoshi High School
- Occupations: Model; Actress; Singer
- Years active: 2003–present
- Known for: Pretty Guardian Sailor Moon; Kishidan; Ohsama Sentai King-Ohger

Alisa Yuriko Durbrow (アリサ・ユリコ・ダーブロウ, Arisa Yuriko Dāburō) (born April 16, 1988) is a Japanese model, actress, and singer from Saitama Prefecture.

== History ==
She is most famous for her role as Mio Kuroki in the Sailor Moon live action show Pretty Guardian Sailor Moon. Her mother is of Japanese descent, while her father is an American of English descent. She is fluent in both English and Japanese. Alisa also starred in the music video Koibito by Japanese rock band, Kishidan. Her current modeling agency is Junes.

== Personal life ==
Alisa is currently married to Japanese singer Manabu Taniguti, who is known by his stage name Mah and is the vocalist of alternative metal-band SiM. The couple have a son together. Alisa's hobbies include taking sticker pictures and shopping.

== Actress – Filmography ==
=== TV series ===
- GARO (2005/2006) – Superhero action/adventure. As Shizuka.
- Pretty Guardian Sailor Moon (2003/2005) – TV Live Action Series. As Mio Kuroki.
- V Jump TV – Channel BB as a regular MC
- Ohsama Sentai King-Ohger (2023–2024) – Himeno's mother (episode 7)

=== DVD ===
- 2002: Just a Princess
- 2006: Audrey

=== Photo books ===
- 2002: Just a Princess
- 2002: Suhada no Alisa
- We Want to be a Model
