= List of Kikai Sentai Zenkaiger characters =

Kikai Sentai Zenkaiger (機界戦隊ゼンカイジャー, Kikai Sentai Zenkaijā) is a Japanese tokusatsu series that serves as the 45th installment in the Super Sentai franchise and the second entry in the Reiwa era. Some of the characters also participate in Zenkaiger's direct sequel, Avataro Sentai Donbrothers.

== Main characters ==
=== Zenkaigers ===
The eponymous Zenkaigers consist of a lone human who leads a team of four Machine Life Form Kikainoids (機械生命体キカイノイド, Kikai Seimeitai Kikainoido) from the parallel world of Kikaitopia (キカイトピア). Later in the series, the team receives assistance from the World Pirates' leader, Zocks, in their fight against Tozitend's regime and the fugitive Stacy once their fight is nearing to a close.

The Zenkaigers utilize a multipurpose Geartlinger (ギアトリンガー, Giatoringā) firearm for transformation, combat, or to enlarge the robot members of the team. It can also access the weapons and/or abilities of past Super Sentai heroes by scanning a Sentai Gear. Their team finisher is the Zenkai Finish Buster (ゼンカイフィニッシュバスター, Zenkai Finisshu Basutā). When enlarged, the robot members can access stronger, mecha-like forms via Kikai Transformation (機界変形, Kikai Henkei) and summon a giant version of the Geartlinger called the Geartlinger Bazooka (ギアトリンガーバズーカ, Giatoringā Bazūka) to perform a stronger version of the Zenkai Finish Buster.

==== Kaito Goshikida ====
Kaito Goshikida (五色田 介人, Goshikida Kaito) is the leader and sole human member of the team. He is a cheerful young man who is usually easygoing, but dedicates himself wholeheartedly when something piques his interest. Prior to the series, his scientist parents discovered parallel worlds before they suddenly disappeared, leaving Kaito to be raised by his grandmother.

Kaito can transform into the white-colored "Secret Power" (秘密のパワー, Himitsu no Pawā), Zenkaizer (ゼンカイザー, Zenkaizā). While he is incapable of fighting gigantic opponents, he can initiate the Zenkai Combinations and serve as ZenkaiOh's pilot. Additionally, he can assume the following forms:

- Super Zenkaizer (スーパーゼンカイザー, Sūpā Zenkaizā): Kaito's power-up form, also known as the "Secret Power-Up" (秘密のパワーアップ, Himitsu no Pawā Appu), accessed from the Zenkaiju Gear that clads him in armor based on the Zyurangers' giant robot Gouryuzin. In this form, he wields the Zenkaiten Lance (ゼンカイテンランス, Zenkaiten Ransu), based on Gouryuzin's weapon the Mighty Dragon Spear Dragon Antler, which allows him to perform the Super Zenkai: Super Buster (超ゼンカイ・スーパーバスター, Chō Zenkai Sūpā Basutā) finisher. Like the Kikainoid Zenkaigers, he can also enlarge into Giant Super Zenkaizer (巨大スーパーゼンカイザー, Kyodai Sūpā Zenkaizā), which forms the main body of ZenkaijuOh and the right half of Super ZenkaiOh, and transform further into the aircraft-themed Zenkaiju Drill (ゼンカイジュウドリル, Zenkaijū Doriru) mecha, based on Gokai Silver's mecha GouZyu Drill.
- Kirameki Zenkaizer (キラメキゼンカイザー, Kirameki Zenkaizā): A special form, also known as the "Secret Kirameki" (秘密のキラメキ, Himitsu no Kirameki), accessed from the Kirameki Zenkaiju Gear that clads Kaito in Go Kiramai Red's armor. In this form, he wields the Zenkaiten Lance. This form appears exclusively in the V-Cinema Kikai Sentai Zenkaiger vs. Kiramager vs. Senpaiger.
- Goldon Zenkaizer (ゴールドンゼンカイザー, Gōrudon Zenkaizā): A special form accessed from the Don Zenkai Blade (ドンゼンカイブレード, Don Zenkai Burēdo) katana, which is summoned by Don Momotaro, that clads Kaito in Goldon Momotaro's armor and cape. This form appears exclusively in the V-Cinema Avataro Sentai Donbrothers vs. Zenkaiger.

Later in the series, Kaito acquires the Zenryoku Zenkai Cannon (ゼンリョクゼンカイキャノン, Zenryoku Zenkai Kyanon) rifle, which allows him to summon copies of past Super Sentai members to fight alongside him and perform the Zenryoku Zenkai Finale Buster (ゼンリョクゼンカイフィナーレバスター, Zenryoku Zenkai Fināre Basutā) finisher. It can also enlarge and transform into the fighter jet-themed Zenryoku Eagle (ゼンリョクイーグル, Zenryoku Īguru) mecha, which forms the head and torso of Zenryoku ZenkaiOh.

Kaito Goshikida is portrayed by Kiita Komagine (駒木根 葵汰, Komagine Kiita). As a child, Kaito is portrayed by Yumeki Uenoyama (上野山 夢輝, Uenoyama Yumeki) in episodes 1, 15, 19, and 42, and by Kō Enomoto (榎本 晄, Enomoto Kō) in episode 40.

==== Juran ====
Juran (ジュラン) is a bold and energetic Kikainoid, as well as the oldest of the four robot members, who loves parties and enjoys being the center of attention. He is the first Kikainoid that Kaito recruits.

Juran can transform into the red-colored "Dinosaur Power" (恐竜パワー, Kyōryū Pawā), Zenkai Juran (ゼンカイジュラン). While transformed, he wields the Juran Sword (ジュランソード, Juran Sōdo) and the Juran Shield (ジュランシールド, Juran Shīrudo), based on Daizyuzin's weapons the Dinosaur Sword God Horn and the Mammoth Shield respectively. He can also transform into the Juran Tyranno (ジュランティラノ, Juran Tirano) mecha, based on Tyranno Ranger's mecha Guardian Beast Tyrannosaurus, which forms the left half of (Super/Don) ZenkaiOh and the right arm of Zenryoku ZenkaiOh.

Juran is voiced by Shintarō Asanuma (浅沼 晋太郎, Asanuma Shintarō), who also voices his great-grandfather Sanjo (サンジョ). In his human form, Juran is portrayed by Katsuya Takagi (高木 勝也, Takagi Katsuya).

==== Gaon ====
Gaon (ガオーン, Gaōn) is a passionate and eccentric Kikainoid who does not appreciate the company of other Kikainoids and mechanical beings despite being one of them as he is fond of organic beings. He is the second Kikainoid that Kaito recruits, joining so he can defend all humans and animals from Tozitend. After joining the Zenkaigers, Gaon becomes Colorful's chef.

Gaon can transform into the yellow-colored "Hundred Beasts Power" (百獣パワー, Hyakujū Pawā), Zenkai Gaon (ゼンカイガオーン, Zenkai Gaōn). While transformed, he wields the Gaon Claw (ガオーンクロー, Gaōn Kurō), based on Gao Red's weapon the Lion Fang. He can also transform into the Gaon Lion (ガオーンライオン, Gaōn Raion) mecha, based on Gao Red's mecha Gao Lion, which forms the right half of ZenkaiOh and the left arm of Zenryoku ZenkaiOh.

Gaon is voiced by Yuki Kaji (梶 裕貴, Kaji Yūki). In his human form, Gaon is portrayed by Hiroki Sasamori (笹森 裕貴, Sasamori Hiroki).

==== Magine ====
Magine (マジーヌ, Majīnu) is a timid and kind Kikainoid who enjoys studying magic and the occult. She is the third Kikainoid that Kaito recruits.

Magine can transform into the pink-colored "Magical Power" (魔法パワー, Mahō Pawā), Zenkai Magine (ゼンカイマジーヌ, Zenkai Majīnu). While transformed, she wields the Magine Stick (マジーヌスティック, Majīnu Sutikku) scepter, based on the Magirangers' sidearm the Magi Stick. She can also transform into the Magine Dragon (マジンドラゴン, Majin Doragon) mecha, based on the Magirangers' mecha Magi Dragon, which forms the right half of ZenkaiOh and the right leg of Zenryoku ZenkaiOh.

Magine is voiced by Yume Miyamoto (宮本 侑芽, Miyamoto Yume). In her human form, Magine is portrayed by Sachika Nitta (新田 さちか, Nitta Sachika).

==== Vroon ====
Vroon (ブルーン, Burūn) is a clumsy and curious Kikainoid with neat freak tendencies. He is the fourth and final Kikainoid that Kaito recruits, joining after he defects from Tozitend where he initially worked as a janitor in the Tozitend Palace and was abused by his former leaders. After joining the Zenkaigers, Vroon becomes Colorful's janitor and uses what little knowledge he managed to glean from Tozitend to help Kaito find his missing parents.

Vroon can transform into the blue-colored "Rumbling Power" (轟轟パワー, Gōgō Pawā), Zenkai Vroon (ゼンカイブルーン, Zenkai Burūn). While transformed, he wields the Vroon Picker (ブルーンピッカー, Burūn Pikkā) battle axe, based on DaiBouken's weapon the Go Picker. He can also transform into the Vroon Dump (ブルーンダンプ, Burūn Danpu) mecha, based on Bouken Red's mecha GoGo Dump, which forms the left half of ZenkaiOh and the left leg of Zenryoku ZenkaiOh.

Vroon is voiced by Takuya Satō (佐藤 拓也, Satō Takuya). In his human form, Vroon is portrayed by Noriyuki Ohashi (大橋 典之, Ōhashi Noriyuki).

=== Zocks Goldtsuiker ===
Zocks Goldtsuiker (ゾックス・ゴールドツイカー, Zokkusu Gōrudotsuikā) is a World Pirate (世界海賊, Sekai Kaizoku) from the parallel world of Kaizokutopia (海賊トピア) who travels the multiverse in the battleship/crocodile-themed CrocoDaiOh (クロコダイオー, Kurokodaiō) mecha with his family to find the SD Toziru Gear so he can restore his younger brothers to their original forms. In pursuit of this goal, he initially clashes with the Zenkaigers due to their Sentai Gears' similarity to Toziru Gears. His equipment is based on that of the Gokaigers and developed with technology stolen from Tozitend.

Unlike the Zenkaigers, Zocks utilizes the ship's wheel-like Geardalinger (ギアダリンガー, Giadaringā) sidearm, which can switch between Gun Mode (ガンモード, Gan Mōdo) and Sword Mode (ソードモード, Sōdo Mōdo), to transform into the gold-colored "Pirate Power" (海賊のパワー, Kaizoku no Pawā), Twokaizer (ツーカイザー, Tsūkaizā). While transformed, he primarily wields the Geardalinger in Gun Mode, which allows him to perform the Twokaizer: Gold Scramble (ツーカイザー・ゴールドスクランブル, Tsūkaizā Gōrudo Sukuranburu) finisher. Additionally, he can assume the following forms:

- Ohran Form (オーレンフォーム, Ōren Fōmu): A King Ranger-themed auxiliary form, also known as the "Hot-Blooded Superpower" (熱血超力, Nekketsu Chōriki), accessed from Twokai Ricky's personal Sentai Gear that grants superhuman athleticism. Zocks' finisher in this form is the Twokaizer: Super-Powered Star Knuckle (ツーカイザー・超力スターナックル, Tsūkaizā Chōriki Sutā Nakkuru).
- Shinken Form (シンケンフォーム, Shinken Fōmu): A Hyper Shinken Red-themed auxiliary form, also known as the "Cool Samurai" (クールに侍, Kūru ni Samurai), accessed from Twokai Cutanner's personal Sentai Gear that grants proficiency in sword fighting. In this form, Zocks primarily wields the Geardalinger in Sword Mode, which allows him to perform the Thrilling Slash: True Sword Flash (痛快斬・真剣一閃, Tsūkaizan Shinken Issen) finisher.
- Super Twokaizer (スーパーツーカイザー, Sūpā Tsūkaizā): Zocks' power-up form, also known as the "Pirate Power-Up" (海賊のパワーアップ, Kaizoku no Pawā Appu), accessed from the Zenkaiju Gear that clads him in armor and a cape based on Time Fire's giant robot V-Rex Robo and grants warp speed capabilities. His finisher in this form is the Twokaizer: Rex Refreezer (ツーカイザー・レックスリフレイザー, Tsūkaizā Rekkusu Rifureizā). Similarly to Super Zenkaizer, he can also enlarge and transform into the Super Twokaizer SD (スーパーツーカイザーSD, Sūpā Tsūkaizā Esu Dī) mecha, which forms the head and upper spine of ZenkaijuOh.
- Kirameki Twokaizer (キラメキツーカイザー, Kirameki Tsūkaizā): A special form, also known as the "Pirate Kirameki" (海賊のキラメキ, Kaizoku no Kirameki), accessed from the Kirameki Zenkaiju Gear that clads Zocks in Go Kiramai Silver's armor. This form appears exclusively in the V-Cinema Kikai Sentai Zenkaiger vs. Kiramager vs. Senpaiger.

Zocks Goldtsuiker is portrayed by Atsuki Mashiko (増子 敦貴, Mashiko Atsuki).

=== Stacy ===
Stacy (ステイシー, Suteishī) is Barashitara's son who is a human-Kikainoid hybrid with chūnibyō syndrome and a grudge against his father for abandoning his mother and Barashitara's 893rd wife Lise (リセ, Rise) before she died. Stacy agrees to become Izirude's test subject and use his technology to prevent the Zenkaigers from interfering with Tozitend's plans and surpass Barashitara. Amidst his battles, Stacy develops an attachment to Yatsude, who reminds him of his mother. After being defeated by the Zenkaigers and ZenkaijuOh, Izirude upgrades Stacy, equipping him with new weapons and the ability to summon past red warriors in their power-up forms. Eventually however, Stacy helps the Zenkaigers in their final battle against Tozitend and kills Barashitara with Zocks' help. Following Kaito's victory over God and unsealing all of the parallel worlds, Stacy refuses the Kikainoids' offer to become their new ruler following the end of the Tozitend dynasty, but helps in Kikaitopia’s transition while occasionally visiting Colorful.

Utilizing a dark copy of the Geartlinger called the Geartozinger (ギアトジンガー, Giatojingā), Stacy can transform into the violet-colored "Dark Power" (暗黒のパワー, Ankoku no Pawā), Stacaesar (ステイシーザー, Suteishīzā). (Note: "Stacaesar" is written in kanji as "崇帝示威座亜".) While transformed, he can perform the Caesar: Dark Evil Binding Attack (シーザー・暗黒邪縛撃, Shīzā Ankoku Jabakugeki) finisher. After having his injuries treated and empowered by Izirude, Stacy is further upgraded into Stacaesar Kyoka (ステイシーザー強化, Suteishīzā Kyōka) where he is equipped with a shield, arm missiles, and a chest cannon, allowing him to perform the Caesar: Dark Meteor Shower (シーザー・暗黒流醒群, Shīzā Ankoku Ryūseigun) and Caesar: Evil King Cannon Emperor Shoot (シーザー・邪王砲皇撃, Shīzā Jaō Hōkōgeki) attacks.

- Battle Caesar Robo (バトルシーザーロボ, Batoru Shīzā Robo): Stacaesar's personal giant robot, based on the Battle Fever team's giant robot Battle Fever Robo, that wields the Dark Sword (暗黒剣, Ankokuken), the Stayshield (ステイシールド, Suteishīrudo), and the twin shin-mounted Swordcaesar (ソードシーザー, Sōdoshīzā) blades. It is destroyed by TwokaiOh Ricky and Cutanner in a duel with Twokaizer.
  - Battle Caesar Robo II (バトルシーザーロボ2世, Batoru Shīzā Robo Ni-sei): The first upgraded model of Battle Caesar Robo with heavy emphasis on long ranged attacks while retaining its original weapons. Its finisher is the Caesar: Dark Thunder Attack (シーザー・暗黒雷冥撃, Shīzā Ankoku Raimeigeki). It is destroyed by ZenkaijuOh.
  - Battle Caesar Robo III (バトルシーザーロボ3世, Batoru Shīzā Robo San-sei): The second upgraded model of Battle Caesar Robo.
- Black JuraGaon (ブラックジュラガオーン, Burakku Juragaōn): A dark copy of ZenkaiOh JuraGaon composed of the Black Juran Tyranno (ブラックジュランティラノ, Burakku Juran Tirano) and Black Gaon Lion (ブラックガオーンライオン, Burakku Gaōn Raion) mecha. It is destroyed by ZenkaijuOh.

Stacy is portrayed by Ryo Sekoguchi (世古口 凌, Sekoguchi Ryō). As a child, Stacy is portrayed by Ibuki Sugō (周郷 一颯, Sugō Ibuki).

=== Sentai Gears ===
The Sentai Gears (センタイギア, Sentai Gia) are a series of items that the Zenkaigers and Twokaizer use to access their powers. Aside from their personal transformation items, they also possess legend items that unlock the powers of the previous 45 Super Sentai, numbered after their respective season and usually stored in either Zenkaizer's Zenkai Buckle (ゼンカイバックル, Zenkai Bakkuru) belt or Twokaizer's Twokai Buckle (ツーカイバックル, Tsūkai Bakkuru) belt. The Zenkaigers use abilities pertaining to the original members of each Sentai team while Twokaizer gains powers based on their additional heroes. During the final battle against Bokkowaus, the Zenkaigers' personal Sentai Gears turn into Avataro Gear-shaped Sentai Gears. In Avataro Sentai Donbrothers, the Sentai Gears are also used as part of the alternate Kaito's equipment, some of which are obtained from the destruction of a Hitotsuki. By obtaining a Sentai/Avataro Gear from the destroyed monsters, the alternate Kaito is able to share its powers with the Donbrothers to initiate Avatar Changes into past Sentai warriors.

Furthermore, Stacaesar possesses dark copies of the Sentai Gears called Dark Sentai Gears (ダークセンタイギア, Dāku Sentai Gia), which he can use to create copies of past Super Sentai teams and/or giant robots to fight for him. However, according to Izirude, the Dark Sentai Gears must be used sparingly or else said copies will disappear from overuse. Staceasar later gains an upgrade that allows him to summon advanced copies of the red warriors based on their power-up forms.

==== Transformation ====
- 16. Zenkai Juran: Juran's personal Sentai Gear, based on the Zyurangers' giant robot Daizyuzin, that he uses to transform into Zenkai Juran and enlarge into Juran Tyranno. In Avataro Sentai Donbrothers, Zenkaizer Black uses it to summon a copy of Juran Tyrann to help Don Momotaro in facilitating the Don ZenkaiOh combination in the Noto Layer.
- 19. Twokai Ricky: Ricky's personal Sentai Gear, based on the Ohrangers' giant robot Ohranger Robo, that Zocks uses to assume Ohran Form and assemble TwokaiOh Ricky.
- 25. Zenkai Gaon: Gaon's personal Sentai Gear, based on the Gaorangers' giant robot Gao King, that he uses to transform into Zenkai Gaon and enlarge into Gaon Lion.
- 29. Zenkai Magine: Magine's personal Sentai Gear, based on the Magirangers' giant robot Magi King, that she uses to transform into Zenkai Magine and enlarge into Magine Dragon.
- 30. Zenkai Vroon: Vroon's personal Sentai Gear, based on the Boukengers' giant robot DaiBouken, that he uses to transform into Zenkai Vroon and enlarge into Vroon Dump.
- 33. Twokai Cutanner: Cutanner's personal Sentai Gear, based on the Shinkengers' giant robot ShinkenOh, that Zocks uses to assume Shinken Form and assemble TwokaiOh Cutanner.
- 35. Twokaizer: Zocks' personal Sentai Gear, based on the Gokaigers' leader Gokai Red and their giant robot GokaiOh, that he uses to transform into Twokaizer and summon CrocoDaiOh.
- 45. Zenkaizer: Kaito's personal Sentai Gear, based on the Gorengers' leader Akarenger and their aircraft the Varidorin, that he uses to transform into Zenkaizer and assemble ZenkaiOh.
- 45. Zenkaiger (Red) (ゼンカイジャー (レッド), Zenkaijā (Reddo)): Zenkai Red's personal Sentai Gear, which is a red-colored version of the Zenkaizer Gear, that he uses to transform.
- Dark (暗, An). Staecaesar: Stacy's personal Dark Sentai Gear, based on the Battle Fever Squad's leader Battle Japan, that he uses to transform into Stacaesar.
- Z. Zenkaiju (ゼンカイジュウ, Zenkaijū): A sentient kaiju-themed Sentai Gear that changes from Kaiju Mode (怪獣モード, Kaijū Mōdo) to Sentai Gear Mode (センタイギアモード, Sentai Gia Mōdo) for Zenkaizer and Twokaizer to assume their power-up forms.

==== Legend ====
- 01. Gorenger (ゴレンジャー, Gorenjā): Allows the Zenkaigers to perform the Gorengers' Gorenger Hurricane (ゴレンジャーハリケーン, Gorenjā Harikēn) finisher.
- 02. J.A.K.Q. (ジャッカー, Jakkā): Grants Twokaizer the use of Big One's Big Baton (ビッグバトン, Biggu Baton).
- 03. Battle Fever (バトルフィーバー, Batoru Fībā): Grants the Zenkaigers the use of the Battle Fever Squad's individual fighting styles.
- 04. Denjiman (デンジマン): Grants the Zenkaigers the use of the Denjimen's Denji Punch (デンジパンチ, Denji Panchi) gauntlets.
- 05. Sun Vulcan (サンバルカン, San Barukan): Allows the Zenkaigers to perform the Sun Vulcan team's Vulcan Ball (バルカンボール, Barukan Bōru) finisher.
- 06. Goggle-V (ゴーグルファイブ, Gōguru Faibu): Allows the Zenkaigers to perform the Goggle-V team's Ribbon Sparks (リボンスパーク, Ribon Supāku) attack.
- 07. Dynaman (ダイナマン, Dainaman): Allows the Zenkaigers to perform either Dyna Pink's Rose Finale (バラフィナーレ, Bara Fināre) attack or the Dynamen's Feedback Cicada Chorus (フィードバックセミシグレ, Fīdobakku Semi Shigure) attack.
- 08. Bioman (バイオマン, Baioman): Allows the Zenkaigers to perform the Biomen's Bio Electro Beam (バイオエレクトロビーム, Baio Erekutoro Bīmu) finisher.
- 09. Changeman (チェンジマン, Chenjiman): Allows the Zenkaigers to perform Change Gryphon's Gryphon Magma Galaxy (グリフォンマグマギャラクシー, Gurifon Maguma Gyarakushī) attack.
- 10. Flashman (フラッシュマン, Furasshuman): Allows the Zenkaigers to perform the Flashmen's Rolling Vulcan (ローリングバルカン, Rōringu Barukan) finisher.
- 11. Maskman (マスクマン, Masukuman): Allows the Zenkaigers to channel the Maskmen's Aura Power (オーラパワー, Ōra Pawa) energy source.
- 12. Liveman (ライブマン, Raibuman): Grants the Zenkaigers the use of Red Falcon's Falcon Saber (ファルコンセイバー, Farukon Seibā).
- 13. Turboranger (ターボレンジャー, Tāborenjā): Grants the Zenkaigers and/or Twokaizer superhuman speed.
- 14. Fiveman (ファイブマン, Faibuman): Grants the Zenkaigers superhuman intelligence.
- 15. Jetman (ジェットマン, Jettoman): Allows the Zenkaigers to either reenact the ending scene of Chōjin Sentai Jetman's final episode or make tomato sauce using one of Yellow Owl's tomatoes.
- 16. Zyuranger (ジュウレンジャー, Jūrenjā): Allows the Zenkaigers to perform the Zyurangers' Babel Attack (バベルアタック, Baberu Atakku) finisher.
- 17. Dairanger (ダイレンジャー, Dairenjā): Grants the Zenkaigers the use of the Dairangers' Dairen Rod (ダイレンロッド, Dairen Roddo) bō and/or allows them to perform Shishi Ranger's Phantom Sōtetsu Line (幻相鉄線, Maboroshi Sōtetsu-sen) attack. When used by Twokaizer, he gains the use of Kiba Ranger's Byakko Shinken (白虎真剣; White Tiger True Sword).
- 18. Kakuranger (カクレンジャー, Kakurenjā): Allows the Zenkaigers to perform the Kakurangers' Hidden Style (隠れ流, Kakure-ryū) techniques.
- 19. Ohranger (オーレンジャー, Ōrenjā): Allows the Zenkaigers to perform Twokaizer Ohran Form's Twokaizer: Super-Powered Star Knuckle.
- 20. Carranger (カーレンジャー, Kārenjā): Allows the Zenkaigers to perform Yellow Racer's Racing Mechanic Dismantling (激走メカニックばらし, Gekisō Mekanikku Barashi) attack.
- 21. Megaranger (メガレンジャー, Megarenjā): Grants the Zenkaigers the ability to convert a flat surface into a hoverboard.
- 22. Gingaman (ギンガマン): Grants Twokaizer bull taming capabilities.
- 23. GoGoFive (ゴーゴーファイブ, Gōgō Faibu): Grants the Zenkaigers knowledge in rescue operations.
- 24. Timeranger (タイムレンジャー, Taimurenjā): Allows the Zenkaigers to reverse the flow of time.
- 25. Gaoranger (ガオレンジャー, Gaorenjā): Grants the Zenkaigers animalistic fighting instincts.
- 26. Hurricaneger (ハリケンジャー, Harikenjā): Allows the Zenkaigers to perform the Hurricanegers' Super Ninja Art: Shadow Dance (超忍法・影の舞, Chō Ninpō Kage no Mai) attack. When used by Twokaizer, he gains the use of Shurikenger's Shuriken's Bat (シュリケンズバット, Shurikenzu Batto) sidearm.
- 27. Abaranger (アバレンジャー, Abarenjā): Grants Twokaizer the use of Abare Killer's Wing Pentact (ウイングペンタクト, Uingu Pentakuto) sidearm.
- 28. Dekaranger (デカレンジャー, Dekarenjā): Grants the Zenkaigers the use of the Dekarangers' D-Wapper (ディーワッパー, Dī Wappā) handcuffs.
- 29. Magiranger (マジレンジャー, Majirenjā): Grants the Zenkaigers the use of the Magirangers' Magi Stick (マジスティック, Maji Sutikku) sidearm.
- 30. Boukenger (ボウケンジャー, Bōkenjā): Grants the Zenkaigers the ability to encase an enemy in the Boukengers' Hyper Concrete (ハイパーコンクリート, Haipā Konkurīto).
- 31. Gekiranger (ゲキレンジャー, Gekirenjā): Grants Twokaizer the use of Geki Chopper's SaiBlade (サイブレード, Saiburēdo) sidearm.
- 32. Go-onger (ゴーオンジャー, Gōonjā): Allows Twokaizer and one of the Zenkaigers to perform the Go-on Wings' Jet Dagger (ジェットダガー, Jetto Dagā) attack.
- 33. Shinkenger (シンケンジャー, Shinkenjā): Allows the Zenkaigers to either perform Twokaizer Shinken Form's Thrilling Slash: True Sword Flash or channel the Shinkengers' Modikara (モヂカラ, Mojikara; Character Power) energy source.
- 34. Goseiger (ゴセイジャー, Goseijā): Allows the Zenkaigers to perform the Goseigers' Tensou Techniques (天装術, Tensō Jutsu). When used by Twokaizer, he gains the ability to transform into Gosei Knight's Groundion Headder (グランディオンヘッダー, Gurandion Heddā) form.
- 35. Gokaiger (ゴーカイジャー, Gōkaijā): Allows the Zenkaigers to switch weapons during combat.
- 36. Go-Busters (ゴーバスターズ, Gōbasutāzu): Grants the Zenkaigers the use of the Go-Busters' Buster Power (バスターパワー, Basutā Pawā) abilities.
- 37. Kyoryuger (キョウリュウジャー, Kyōryūjā): Grants the Zenkaigers the use of the Kyoryugers' samba-like fighting style.
- 38. ToQger (トッキュウジャー, Tokkyūjā): Allows the Zenkaigers to perform a train-like linked attack.
- 39. Ninninger (ニンニンジャー, Ninninjā): Allows the Zenkaigers to perform the Ninningers' Shuriken Ninja Art Secret Technique: Nin Fury Slash (シュリケン忍法奥義・忍烈斬, Shuriken Ninpō Ōgi Nin Retsu Zan) finisher.
- 40. Zyuohger (ジュウオウジャー, Jūōjā): Grants the Zenkaigers the use of Zyuoh Eagle's Wild Release (野生解放, Yasei Kaihō) ability. When used by Twokaizer, he gains the use of Zyuoh The World's Zyuoh The Gun Rod (ジュウオウザガンロッド, Jūō Za Gan Roddo) sidearm.
- 41. Kyuranger (キュウレンジャー, Kyūrenjā): Grants the Zenkaigers the use of Shishi Red's extra luck. When used by Twokaizer, he gains Koguma Skyblue's ability to enlarge himself via the Ooguma Kyutama.
- 42. Lupinranger (ルパンレンジャー, Rupanrenjā): (Note: The Lupinranger and Patranger Gears share the same number as both teams appeared in Super Sentai's 42nd season.) Allows the Zenkaigers to perform the Lupinrangers' Seizing Strike (イタダキストライク, Itadaki Sutoraiku) finisher. Used exclusively in the web-exclusive series Kikai Sentai Zenkaiger Spin-Off: Zenkai Red Great Introduction!.
- 42. Patranger (パトレンジャー, Patorenjā): Allows the Zenkaigers to channel the fusion ability of the Patrangers' Patren Ugou (パトレンU号, Patoren Yū-gō) form and bring multiple targets together. During the events of the web-exclusive series Kikai Sentai Zenkaiger Spin-Off: Zenkai Red Great Introduction!, Zenkai Red uses a special Super Red (スーパーレッド, Sūpā Reddo) version of this Sentai Gear to perform the Patrangers' One-Shot Strike (イチゲキストライク, Ichigeki Sutoraiku) finisher.
- 43. Ryusoulger (リュウソウジャー, Ryūsōjā): Grants the Zenkaigers the use of the Ryusoulgers' Ryusoul Ken (リュウソウケン, Ryūsō Ken; Ryusoul Sword) sidearm.
- 44. Kiramager (キラメイジャー, Kirameijā): Allows the Zenkaigers to either summon small drone versions of the Kiramagers' Kiramai Mashin for combat assistance or create confetti sparkles.
- 46. Donbrothers (ドンブラザーズ, Donburazāzu): An Avataro Gear-shaped Sentai Gear given to Kaito by Isao that allows the Zenkaigers to summon Don Momotaro.

==== Special ====
- All Red (オールレッド, Ōru Reddo): Allows the Zenkaigers to summon the red warriors of their 45 Super Sentai predecessors. Used exclusively in the film Kikai Sentai Zenkaiger the Movie: Red Battle! All Sentai Great Assemble!!
- Miss (非, Hi). Akibaranger (アキバレンジャー, Akibarenjā): Grants the Zenkaigers the ability to raise a death flag for the target. Used exclusively in the crossover film Saber + Zenkaiger: Super Hero Senki.
- Kirameki Zenkaiju (キラメキゼンカイジュウ, Kirameki Zenkaijū): A variant of the Zenkaiju Gear that allows Zenkaizer and Twokaizer to assume their Kirameki (キラメキ) forms. Used exclusively in the V-Cinema Kikai Sentai Zenkaiger vs. Kiramager vs. Senpaiger.

==== Rider ====
The Rider Gears (ライダーギア, Raidā Gia) are three special one-use-only gears created by Flint, inspired by the World Pirates' travels around the Kamen Riders' worlds.

- 01. Zero-One (ゼロワン, Zero Wan): (Note: The Zero-One and Saber Rider Gears are numbered after their production order among the Reiwa Kamen Rider series.) Allows the Zenkaigers to perform Kamen Rider Zero-One's Rising Impact (ライジングインパクト, Raijingu Impakuto) finisher.
- 02. Saber (セイバー, Seibā): Grants the Zenkaigers the use of Kamen Rider Saber's Kaenken Rekka (火炎剣烈火; Flame Sword Raging Fire) knightly sword.
- 20. Zi-O (ジオウ, Jiō): (Note: The Zi-O Rider Gear is numbered after its production order among the Heisei Kamen Rider series) Grants the Zenkaigers the use of Kamen Rider Zi-O II's precognition capabilities.

=== ZenkaiOh ===
ZenkaiOh (ゼンカイオー, Zenkaiō) is a series of giant robots each composed of any two Kikainoid Zenkaiger mecha via Zenkai Combination (全界合体, Zenkai Gattai).

- ZenkaiOh JuraGaon (ゼンカイオージュラガオーン, Zenkaiō Juragaōn): A yellow/red-colored combination of Juran Tyranno and Gaon Lion that can switch between wielding the Juran Sword/Juran Shield and the Gaon Claw. Its finisher is the Juran Sword: Full Moon Crush (ジュランソード・円月クラッシュ, Juran Sōdo Engetsu Kurasshu).
- ZenkaiOh JuraMagine (ゼンカイオージュラマジーン, Zenkaiō Juramajīn): A pink/red-colored combination of Juran Tyranno and Magine Dragon that can switch between wielding the Juran Sword/Juran Shield and the Magine Stick.
- ZenkaiOh VrooMagine (ゼンカイオーブルマジーン, Zenkaiō Burumajīn): A pink/blue-colored combination of Magine Dragon and Vroon Dump that can switch between wielding the Magine Stick and the Vroon Picker. Its finisher is the Vroon Picker: Accel Strike (ブルーンピッカー・アクセルストライク, Burūn Pikkā Akuseru Sutoraiku).
- ZenkaiOh VrooGaon (ゼンカイオーブルガオーン, Zenkaiō Burugaōn): A yellow/blue-colored combination of Gaon Lion and Vroon Dump that can switch between wielding the Gaon Claw and the Vroon Picker.

==== Super ZenkaiOh ====
Super ZenkaiOh (スーパーゼンカイオー, Sūpā Zenkaiō) is a combination of Giant Super Zenkaizer and Juran Tyranno that can fire Zenkai Missiles (ゼンカイミサイル, Zenkai Misairu).

==== Don ZenkaiOh ====
Don ZenkaiOh (ドンゼンカイオー, Don Zenkaiō) is Don Momotaro's personal giant robot composed of his enlarged Enya Rideon and Juran Tyranno via Don Zenkai Combination (ドン全界合体, Don Zenkai Gattai) that is equipped with the wrist-mounted Avatar Sword (アバターソード, Abatā Sōdo) and Avatar Shield (アバターシールド, Abatā Shīrudo). Its finisher is the Don Zenkai Crush (ドンゼンカイクラッシュ, Don Zenkai Kurasshu).

=== TwokaiOh ===
TwokaiOh (ツーカイオー, Tsūkaiō) is Twokaizer's personal giant robot composed of CrocoDaiOh, Twokai Cutanner, and Twokai Ricky via Pirate Combination (界賊合体, Kaizoku Gattai) that can switch between two sub-forms.

- TwokaiOh Cutanner (ツーカイオーカッタナー, Tsūkaiō Kattanā): A red/gold-colored combination that is equipped with the left forearm-mounted Cutanner Tou (カッタナー刀, Kattanā Tō). Its finisher is the Cutanner Tou: Raging Fire Big Slash (カッタナー刀・烈火大斬, Kattanā Tō Rekka Daizan).
- TwokaiOh Ricky (ツーカイオーリッキー, Tsūkaiō Rikkī): A blue/silver-colored combination that is equipped with the right forearm-mounted Super Ricky Gun (超リッキーガン, Chō Rikkī Gan). Its finishers are the Super Ricky Gun: Super-Powered Vulcan (超リッキーガン・超力バルカン, Chō Rikkī Gan Chōriki Barukan) and Super Ricky Gun: Super-Powered Burst (超リッキーガン・超力バースト, Chō Rikkī Gan Chōriki Bāsuto).

Additionally, CrocoDaiOh can either split into the CrossKaiOh (クロスカイオー, Kurosukaiō) hovercraft and the CrawlingOh (クローリングオー, Kurōroinguō) motorcycle, piloted by Twokai Cutanner and Twokai Ricky respectively, or transform into the CrocoDai Bazooka (クロコダイバズーカ, Kurokodai Bazūka) cannon.

==== Super TwokaiOh ====
Super TwokaiOh (スーパーツーカイオー, Sūpā Tsūkaiō) is a combination of Super Twokaizer SD, CrocoDaiOh, and Twokai Ricky that wields the Zenkaiten Lance and Cutanner Tou.

=== ZenkaijuOh ===
ZenkaijuOh (ゼンカイジュウオー, Zenkaijūō) is the Super Zenkai Beast Combination (超全界合体獣, Chō Zenkai Gattaijū) of Giant Super Zenkaizer and Super Twokaizer SD whose design is an amalgamation of Dragon Ranger and Time Fire's respective mecha Guardian Beast Dragon Caesar and the V-Rex. Its finisher is the ZenkaijuOh: Twin Breaker (ゼンカイジュウオー・ツインブレイカー, Zenkaijūō Tsuin Bureikā).

=== Zenryoku ZenkaiOh ===
Zenryoku ZenkaiOh (ゼンリョクゼンカイオー, Zenryoku Zenkaiō) is the Zenryoku Zenkai Combination (全力全開合体, Zenryoku Zenkai Gattai) of Juran Tyranno, Gaon Lion, Magine Dragon, Vroon Dump, and the Zenryoku Eagle that wields the Zenryoku Zenkai Sword (ゼンリョクゼンカイソード, Zenryoku Zenkai Sōdo), which is composed of the Kikanoid Zenkaigers' weapons. Its finishers are the Zenkaiger: Zenryoku Five Slash (ゼンカイジャー・ゼンリョクファイブスラッシュ, Zenkaijā Zenryoku Faibu Surasshu) and the Zenkaiger: All Sentai Final Big Bang (ゼンカイジャー・オール戦隊ファイナルビッグバン, Zenkaijā Ōru Sentai Fainaru Biggu Ban).

- Kirameki Zenryoku ZenkaiOh (キラメキゼンリョクゼンカイオー, Kirameki Zenryoku Zenkaiō): An enhanced version of Zenryoku ZenkaiOh. Its finisher is the Zenkaiger: Kirameki Big Bang (ゼンカイジャー・キラメキビッグバン, Zenkaijā Kirameki Biggu Ban). It appears exclusively in the V-Cinema Kikai Sentai Zenkaiger vs. Kiramager vs. Senpaiger.

== Recurring characters ==
=== Goshikida Family ===
The Goshikida family are Kaito's relatives who own a small cafe and snacks shop called the Candy Cafe Colorful (駄菓子カフェカラフル, Dagashi Kafe Karafuru). The family consist of Yatsude Goshikida; her son, Isao Goshikida; his wife, Mitsuko Goshikida; and their son, Kaito Goshikida. Isao and Mitsuko disappeared ten years ago when Kaito was in grade school, leaving him alone with Yatsude. When Tozitend launched their invasion, Kaito discovers his parents' secret lab in Colorful's basement, which later becomes the Zenkaigers' base of operations.

==== Yatsude Goshikida ====
Yatsude Goshikida (五色田 ヤツデ, Goshikida Yatsude) is Kaito's paternal grandmother and the owner of Colorful. Following her son and daughter-in-law's disappearances, Yatsude raised Kaito by herself.

Yatsude Goshikida is portrayed by Ikue Sakakibara (榊原 郁恵, Sakakibara Ikue).

==== Secchan ====
Secchan (セッちゃん, Setchan) is a mechanical bird created by Kaito's parents for him. When Tozitend launched their invasion, he starts to speak and becomes the Zenkaigers' guide, making use of his vast knowledge on the Super Sentai to assist them.

Secchan is voiced by Misato Fukuen (福圓 美里, Fukuen Misato).

==== Isao Goshikida ====
Isao Goshikida (五色田 功, Goshikida Isao) is a scientist, Kaito's father, and Yatsude's son. At some point after discovering parallel worlds and creating the Zenkaigers' equipment using the Super Sentai as inspiration, Isao and his wife Mitsuko were abducted and placed in suspended animation by Tozitend for their multiversal conquest. After Stacy falls out of Tozitend's favor and Mitsuko escapes from their palace, Izirude brainwashes and transforms Isao into the crimson-colored "Machine Power" (機械のパワー, Kikai no Pawā), Hakaizer (ハカイザー, Hakaizā), so he can serve as Tozitend's second enforcer. Hakaizer battles the Zenkaigers on several occasions before Kaito eventually succeeds in freeing Isao from Tozitend's control. Following this, Isao researches the World Pirates' technology, modifies a car so it can travel through the multiverse, and departs to look for Mitsuko, eventually finding her in Sushitopia and bringing her back home.

As Hakaizer, Isao wears a suit of armor which Izirude created through stolen data on Zenkaizer's prototype from Isao and Mitsuko's memories. In combat, Isao wields the V-merang (ブイメラン, Buimeran) and temporarily wielded the Zenryoku Zenkai Cannon, which he refers to as the Zenryoku Hakai Gun (全力破壊銃, Zenryoku Hakaijū; Full Power Destructive Gun). Hakaizer is equipped with the twin forearm-mounted Hakaizer Shot (ハカイザーショット, Hakaizā Shotto) guns, which allow him to perform the Hakai Finish Buster (ハカイフィニッシュバスター, Hakai Finisshu Basutā) finisher. Due to significant energy consumption, the Hakaizer suit cannot remain in the battlefield for extended periods of time and has to be returned to the Tozitend Palace to recharge or else Isao's brainwashing will be undone. Izirude later upgrades Hakaizer into Hakaizer Kai (ハカイザー・改, Hakaizā Kai) and gives him a kaiju-themed giant robot called HakaijuOh (ハカイジュウオー, Hakaijūō), the latter of which is destroyed by ZenkaijuOh and the CrocoDai Bazooka.

Isao Goshikida is portrayed by Daijiro Kawaoka (川岡 大次郎, Kawaoka Daijirō). As a child and a teenager, Isao is portrayed by Sōjirō Chiba (千葉 惣二朗, Chiba Sōjirō), Naritaka Gotō (後藤 成貴, Gotō Naritaka), and Homare Fujii (藤井 誉, Fujii Homare) in episode 40.

==== Mitsuko Goshikida ====
Mitsuko Goshikida (五色田 美都子, Goshikida Mitsuko) is a scientist and Kaito's mother. She disappeared alongside her husband after discovering parallel worlds and creating the Zenkaigers' equipment. Stacy later discovers that she and her husband are in Izirude's custody and helps her escape out of sympathy for Yatsude. Taking refuge in Sushitopia, Mitsuko is later rescued by Isao, who brings her back to Earth.

Mitsuko Goshikida is portrayed by Marie Kai (甲斐 まり恵, Kai Marie).

=== Tozitend ===
The Kikaitopia Dynasty Tozitend (キカイトピア王朝トジテンド, Kikaitopia Ōchō Tojitendo) is an evil dynasty that has ruled Kikaitopia through force and tyranny from their Tozitend Palace (トジテンドパレス, Tojitendo Paresu) and use Toziru Gears (トジルギア, Tojiru Gia) to seal parallel worlds in them. However, after sealing dozens of worlds, including those pertaining to the other Super Sentai, Kikaitopia was mysteriously fused with Kaito's homeworld, preventing them from sealing it and forcing them to deploy their forces to conquer it instead. Following the defeat of its leadership, the remaining Tozitend members are arrested by the Kikaitopians.

==== Bokkowaus ====
Bokkowaus (ボッコワウス, Bokkowausu) is a giant robot, the current leader of Tozitend, and king of Kikaitopia who seeks to take over all parallel worlds and initially possesses a wall-like form after augmenting himself with his predecessors' remains. After numerous defeats, Bokkowaus grows tired of the Zenkaigers and upgrades himself into a humanoid form with Tozitend's remaining Toziru Gears, gaining access to the previous Super Sentai teams' arsenal. However, his plan backfires when the Super Sentai's powers escape from his body and empower the Zenkaigers' Sentai Gears, allowing them to destroy him for good while releasing all of the worlds in his possession.

Bokkowaus is voiced by Jouji Nakata (中田 譲治, Nakata Jōji).

==== Barashitara ====
Barashitara (バラシタラ) is the field commander of Tozitend and Stacy's father. Barashitara is destroyed by Super Twokaizer and Stacaesar Kyoka.

In battle, Barashitara wields the Bara Spear (バラスピアー, Bara Supiā).

Barashitara is voiced by Kenji Nomura (乃村 健次, Nomura Kenji).

==== Izirude ====
Izirude (イジルデ, Ijirude) is the prideful technical officer of Tozitend who is popular in Kikaitopia for his intelligence. In reality, most of Izirude's inventions, such as the Toziru Gears, Stacy's Geartozinger, Hakaizer, and the Zenryoku Zenkai Cannon, are counterfeits based on data taken from the kidnapped Goshikida scientists' memories. Due to his nature, Izirude is driven to kill his own peers in order to cover up his mistakes and keep his secrets. While defending the Tozitend Palace from the Zenkaigers, Izirude is killed in the explosion of his personal giant robot.

In battle, Izirude wields the reach extender-like Izic Hand (イジックハンド, Ijikku Hando) staff, which allows him to unleash a bolt of lightning towards his targets. Additionally, he possesses a personal giant robot called Izirudestroyer IV (イジルデストロイヤー4世, Ijirudesutoroiyā Yon-sei), which wields a larger version of his staff called the Dai Izic Hand (ダイイジックハンド, Dai Ijikku Hando). It is destroyed by ZenkaiOh JuraGaon and ZenkaiOh VrooMagine.

Izirude is voiced by Masanori Takeda (竹田 雅則, Takeda Masanori).

==== Gege ====
Gege (ゲゲ) is Bokkowaus' giant mechanical bird aide that sits on his shoulder. While his suggestions usually earn Bokkowaus' favor, Gege tends to act and scheme behind Tozitend's back due to being controlled by a being claiming to be God. As a result, this eventually leads to Bokkowaus destroying Gege.

Gege is voiced by Tatsuhisa Suzuki (鈴木 達央, Suzuki Tatsuhisa) in episodes 1–21 and by Masaya Fukunishi (福西 勝也, Fukunishi Masaya) from episode 25 onwards after Suzuki stepped out of the role following reports of misconduct.

==== Foot soldiers ====
- Kudaks (クダック, Kudakku): Tozitend's regular foot soldiers who were modified from Kikainoids conscripted into their military and wield the power plug-like two-pronged Plug Lancer (プラグランサー, Puragu Ransā) spears.
- Kudaiters (クダイター, Kudaitā): Promoted Kudaks who also wield Plug Lancers. The Kudaiters are voiced by Hideo Ishikawa (石川 英郎, Ishikawa Hideo) in the film Kikai Sentai Zenkaiger the Movie: Red Battle! All Sentai Great Assemble!! and episode 1, Naoyuki Ageishi (上石 直行, Ageishi Naoyuki) in episodes 24, 26, and 27, and Yukinori Okuhata (奥畑 幸典, Okuhata Yukinori) in episodes 32 and 33.
- Kudaitests (クダイテスト, Kudaitesuto): Tozitend's giant highest-ranking foot soldiers and promoted Kudaiters who are adorned with Monitack Eye (モニタックアイ, Monitakku Ai) visors that can fire beams.
  - New Kudaitests (ニュークダイテスト, Nyū Kudaitesuto): Upgraded Kudaitests who can enlarge to 300 meters by fully charging up their Toziru Energy and are equipped with the right forearm-mounted Kudaitesword (クダイテソード, Kudaitesōdo) blade.

==== Worlds ====
The Worlds (ワルド, Warudo) are Tozitend's monsters created by infusing a Kudak with a Toziru Gear. While they are empowered, a World can gradually alter their surroundings to reflect the parallel world sealed within their Toziru Gear.

- Kinoko World (キノコワルド, Kinoko Warudo): A mushroom-themed monster with the power of the Kinoko Toziru Gear (キノコトジルギア, Kinoko Tojiru Gia), which contains the parallel world of Kinokotopia (キノコトピア). He is destroyed by Zenkaizer and Zenkai Gaon. Voiced by Mitsuaki Kanuka (かぬか 光明, Kanuka Mitsuaki), who also voices Dai Kinoko World.
- Koori World (コオリワルド, Kōri Warudo): An ice-themed monster with the power of the Koori Toziru Gear (コオリトジルギア, Kōri Tojiru Gia), which contains the parallel world of Kooritopia (コオリトピア, Kōritopia). He is destroyed by Zenkaizer and Zenkai Juran, Gaon, and Magine. Voiced by Shintarō Ōhata (大畑 伸太郎, Ōhata Shintarō), who also voices Dai Koori World.
- Boxing World (ボクシングワルド, Bokushingu Warudo): A boxing-themed monster with the power of the Boxing Toziru Gear (ボクシングトジルギア, Bokushingu Tojiru Gia), which contains the parallel world of Boxingtopia (ボクシングトピア, Bokushingutopia). He is destroyed by the Zenkaigers. Voiced by Shunichi Maki (真木 駿一, Maki Shun'ichi), who also voices Dai Boxing World.
- Sushi World (スシワルド, Sushi Warudo): A sushi-themed monster with the power of the Sushi Toziru Gear (スシトジルギア, Sushi Tojiru Gia), which contains the parallel world of Sushitopia (スシトピア). He is destroyed by Zenkaizer and Zenkai Juran. Voiced by Yutaka Aoyama (青山 穣, Aoyama Yutaka), who also voices Dai Sushi World.
- Gomi World (ゴミワルド, Gomi Warudo): A garbage-themed monster with the power of the Gomi Toziru Gear (ゴミトジルギア, Gomi Tojiru Gia), which contains the parallel world of Gomitopia (ゴミトピア). He is destroyed by the Zenkaigers. Voiced by Keiji Himeno (姫野 惠二, Himeno Keiji), who also voices Dai Gomi World.
- Door World (ドアワルド, Doa Warudo): A door-themed monster with the power of the Door Toziru Gear (ドアトジルギア, Doa Tojiru Gia), which contains the parallel world of Doortopia (ドアトピア, Doatopia). He is destroyed by Stacaesar. Voiced by Shōya Chiba (千葉 翔也, Chiba Shōya), who also voices Dai Door World.
- Kashiwamochi World (カシワモチワルド, Kashiwamochi Warudo): A kashiwa mochi-themed monster with the power of the Kashiwamochi Toziru Gear (カシワモチトジルギア, Kashiwamochi Tojiru Gia), which contains the parallel world of Kashiwamochitopia (カシワモチトピア). He is destroyed by Twokaizer. Another Kashiwamochi World replaces his arms with the Hitotsuki Kikaiki's arms to become Kikai Kashiwamochi World (キカイカシワモチワルド, Kikai Kashiwamochi Warudo). He is destroyed alongside Kashiwamochi Kikaiki by Goldon Zenkaizer and Don Zenkai Momotaro. Voiced by Atsushi Abe (阿部 敦, Abe Atsushi), who also voices Dai Kashiwamochi World.
- Mahiru World (マヒルワルド, Mahiru Warudo): A daytime-themed monster with the power of the Mahiru Toziru Gear (マヒルトジルギア, Mahiru Tojiru Gia), which contains the parallel world of Mahirutopia (マヒルトピア). He is destroyed by Twokaizer. Voiced by Atsushi Tamaru (田丸 篤志, Tamaru Atsushi), who also voices Dai Mahiru World.
- Onigokko World (オニゴッコワルド, Onigokko Warudo): A tag-themed monster with the power of the Onigokko Toziru Gear (オニゴッコトジルギア, Onigokko Tojiru Gia), which contains the parallel world of Onigokkotopia (オニゴッコトピア). He is destroyed by the Zenkaigers. Voiced by Junta Terashima (寺島 惇太, Terashima Junta), who also voices Dai Onigokko World.
- Katatsumuri World (カタツムリワルド, Katatsumuri Warudo): A snail-themed monster with the power of the Katatsumuri Toziru Gear (カタツムリトジルギア, Katatsumuri Tojiru Gia), which contains the parallel world of Katatsumuritopia (カタツムリトピア). He is destroyed by the Zenkaigers. Voiced by Yasuhiko Kawazu (川津 泰彦, Kawazu Yasuhiko), who also voices Dai Katatsumuri World.
- Recycle World (リサイクルワルド, Risaikuru Warudo): A recycling-themed monster with the power of the Recycle Toziru Gear (リサイクルトジルギア, Risaikuru Tojiru Gia), which contains the parallel world of Recycletopia (リサイクルトピア, Risaikurutopia). He is destroyed by Twokaizer. Voiced by Ryuzou Ishino (石野 竜三, Ishino Ryūzō), who also voices Dai Recycle World.
- Retro World (レトロワルド, Retoro Warudo): A retro style-themed monster with the power of the Retro Toziru Gear (レトロトジルギア, Retoro Tojiru Gia), which contains the parallel world of Retrotopia (レトロトピア, Retorotopia). He is destroyed by the Kikainoid Zenkaigers. Voiced by Yō Kitazawa (北沢 洋, Kitazawa Yō), who also voices Dai Retro World.
- Jishaku World (ジシャクワルド, Jishaku Warudo): A magnet-themed monster with the power of the Jishaku Toziru Gear (ジシャクトジルギア, Jishaku Tojiru Gia), which contains the parallel world of Jishakutopia (ジシャクトピア). He is destroyed by Zenkaizer. Voiced by Kazuhiro Nakaya (中谷 一博, Nakaya Kazuhiro), who also voices Dai Jishaku World.
- Toumei World (トウメイワルド, Tōmei Warudo): A transparency-themed monster with the power of the Toumei Toziru Gear (トウメイトジルギア, Tōmei Tojiru Gia), which contains the parallel world of Toumeitopia (トウメイトピア, Tōmeitopia). He is destroyed by the Zenkaigers. Voiced by Kentarō Itō (伊藤 健太郎, Itō Kentarō), who also voices Dai Toumei World.
- Renai World (レンアイワルド, Ren'ai Warudo): A falling in love-themed monster with the power of the Renai Toziru Gear (レンアイトジルギア, Ren'ai Tojiru Gia), which contains the parallel world of Renaitopia (レンアイトピア, Ren'aitopia). He is destroyed by Zenkaizer and Twokaizer. Voiced by Ryōta Ōsaka (逢坂 良太, Ōsaka Ryōta), who also voices Dai Renai World.
- Kabutomushi World (カブトムシワルド, Kabutomushi Warudo): A rhinoceros beetle-themed monster with the power of the Kabutomushi Toziru Gear (カブトムシトジルギア, Kabutomushi Tojiru Gia), which contains the parallel world of Kabutomushitopia (カブトムシトピア, Kabutomushitopia). He is destroyed by Super Zenkaizer. Voiced by Hironori Kondō (近藤 浩徳, Kondō Hironori), who also voices Dai Kabutomushi World.
- Hikoboshi World (ヒコボシワルド, Hikoboshi Warudo): A cowherd-themed monster with the power of the Hikoboshi Toziru Gear (ヒコボシトジルギア, Hikoboshi Tojiru Gia), which contains the parallel world of Hikoboshitopia (ヒコボシトピア), and is the counterpart of Orihime World. He is destroyed by Super Twokaizer and Kamen Rider Durendal. Voiced by Sōichirō Hoshi (保志 総一朗, Hoshi Sōichirō), who also voices Dai Hikoboshi World.
- Copy World (コピーワルド, Kopī Warudo): A copying-themed monster with the power of the Copy Toziru Gear (コピートジルギア, Kopī Tojiru Gia), which contains the parallel world of Copytopia (コピートピア, Kopītopia). He is destroyed by the Kikainoid Zenkaigers. Voiced by Jun Fukushima (福島 潤, Fukushima Jun), who also voices Dai Copy World.
- Tougyu World (トウギュウワルド, Tōgyū Warudo): A bullfighting-themed monster with the power of the Tougyu Toziru Gear (トウギュウトジルギア, Tōgyū Tojiru Gia), which contains the parallel world of Tougyutopia (トウギュウトピア, Tōgyūtopia). He is destroyed by Super Zenkaizer and Super Twokaizer. Voiced by Kenta Miyake (三宅 健太, Miyake Kenta), who also voices Dai Tougyu World.
- Vacances World (バカンスワルド, Bakansu Warudo): A vacation-themed monster with the power of the Vacances Toziru Gear (バカンストジルギア, Bakansu Tojiru Gia), which contains the parallel world of Vacancestopia (バカンストピア, Bakansutopia). He is destroyed by Barashitara, who was infuriated that the World affected his subordinates despite him overwhelming the Zenkaigers. Voiced by Taku Yashiro (八代 拓, Yashiro Taku), who also voices Dai Vacances World.
- Hidokei World (ヒドケイワルド, Hidokei Warudo): A sundial-themed monster with the power of the Hidokei Toziru Gear (ヒドケイトジルギア, Hidokei Tojiru Gia), which contains the parallel world of Hidokeitopia (ヒドケイトピア), who resembles Mahiru World. He is destroyed by the Zenkaigers. Voiced by Kohsuke Toriumi (鳥海 浩輔, Toriumi Kōsuke).
- Manga World (マンガワルド, Manga Warudo): A manga-themed monster with the power of the Manga Toziru Gear (マンガトジルギア, Manga Tojiru Gia), which contains the parallel world of Mangatopia (マンガトピア). He is destroyed by Twokaizer. Voiced by Yukihiro Nozuyama (野津山 幸宏, Nozuyama Yukihiro), who also voices Dai Manga World.
- Tennis World (テニスワルド, Tenisu Warudo): A tennis-themed monster with the power of the Tennis Toziru Gear (テニストジルギア, Tenisu Tojiru Gia), which contains the parallel world of Tennistopia (テニストピア, Tenisutopia). He is destroyed by the Zenkaigers. Voiced by Wataru Komada (駒田 航, Komada Wataru), who also voices Dai Tennis World.
- Hoshigaki World (ホシガキワルド, Hoshigaki Warudo): A persimmon-themed monster with the power of the Hoshigaki Toziru Gear (ホシガキトジルギア, Hoshigaki Tojiru Gia), which contains the parallel world of Hoshigakitopia (ホシガキトピア). He is destroyed by Zenkaizer. Voiced by Chihiro Suzuki (鈴木 千尋, Suzuki Chihiro), who also voices Dai Kaki World.
- Gyunyu World (ギュウニュウワルド, Gyū'nyū Warudo): A cow's milk-themed monster with the power of the Gyunyu Toziru Gear (ギュウニュウトジルギア, Gyū'nyū Tojiru Gia), which contains the parallel world of Gyunyutopia (ギュウニュウトピア, Gyū'nyūtopia). He is destroyed by the Zenkaigers. Voiced by Yuuki Shin (新 祐樹, Shin Yūki), who also voices Dai Gyunyu World.
- Sakasama World (サカサマワルド, Sakasama Warudo): An inversion-themed monster with the power of the Sakasama Toziru Gear (サカサマトジルギア, Sakasama Tojiru Gia), which contains the parallel world of Sakasamatopia (サカサマトピア). He is destroyed by Zenkaizer and Stacaesar Kyoka. Voiced by Kazuyuki Okitsu (興津 和幸, Okitsu Kazuyuki), who also voices Dai Sakasama World.
- Gakuen World (ガクエンワルド, Gakuen Warudo): A school-themed monster with the power of the Gakuen Toziru Gear (ガクエントジルギア, Gakuen Tojiru Gia), which contains the parallel world of Gakuentopia (ガクエントピア). He is destroyed by the Zenkaigers. Voiced by Jin Urayama (浦山 迅, Urayama Jin), who also voices Dai Gakuen World.
- Halloween World (ハロウィンワルド, Harowin Warudo): A Halloween-themed monster with the power of the Halloween Toziru Gear (ハロウィントジルギア, Harowin Tojiru Gia), which contains the parallel world of Halloweentopia (ハロウィントピア, Harowintopia). He is destroyed by the Zenkaigers. Voiced by Yasunori Matsumoto (松本 保典, Matsumoto Yasunori), who also voices Dai Halloween World.
- Dia World (ダイヤワルド, Daiya Warudo): A diamond-themed monster with the power of the Dia Toziru Gear (ダイヤトジルギア, Daiya Tojiru Gia), which contains the parallel world of Diatopia (ダイヤトピア, Daiyatopia). He is destroyed by Super Twokaizer. Voiced by Anri Katsu (勝 杏里, Katsu Anri), who also voices Dai Dia World.
- Bikkuribako World (ビックリバコワルド, Bikkuribako Warudo): A jack-in-the-box-themed monster with the power of the Bikkuribako Toziru Gear (ビックリバコトジルギア, Bikkuribako Tojiru Gia), which contains the parallel world of Bikkuribakotopia (ビックリバコトピア). He is destroyed by the Kikainoid Zenkaigers. Voiced by Tetsu Shiratori (白鳥 哲, Shiratori Tetsu), who also voices Dai Bikkuribako World.
- Daikon World (ダイコンワルド, Daikon Warudo): A daikon-themed monster with the power of the Daikon Toziru Gear (ダイコントジルギア, Daikon Tojiru Gia), which contains the parallel world of Daikontopia (ダイコントピア). He is destroyed by Super Zenkaizer and Zenkai Juran and Gaon. Voiced by Hiroyuki Muraoka (村岡 弘之, Muraoka Hiroyuki), who also voices Dai Daikon World.
- Bon World (ボンワルド, Bon Warudo): A Bon Festival-themed monster with the power of the Bon Toziru Gear (ボントジルギア, Bon Tojiru Gia), which contains the parallel world of Bontopia (ボントピア). He is destroyed by Zenkai Gaon, Magine, and Vroon. Voiced by Tomoaki Maeno (前野 智昭, Maeno Tomoaki), who also voices Dai Bon World.
- Shougatsu World (ショウガツワルド, Shōgatsu Warudo): A Japanese New Year-themed monster with the power of the Shougatsu Toziru Gear (ショウガツトジルギア, Shōgatsu Tojiru Gia), which contains the parallel world of Shougatsutopia (ショウガツトピア, Shōgatsutopia). He is destroyed by the Zenkaigers and Super Twokaizer. Voiced by Kento Hama (濱 健人, Hama Kento), who also voices Dai Shougatsu World.
- Men World (メンワルド, Men Warudo): A noodle-themed monster with the power of the Men Toziru Gear (メントジルギア, Men Tojiru Gia), which contains the parallel world of Mentopia (メントピア). He is destroyed by the Zenkaigers and Super Twokaizer. Voiced by Nobuyuki Kobushi (こぶし のぶゆき, Kobushi Nobuyuki), who also voices Dai Men World.
- Kotatsu World (コタツワルド, Kotatsu Warudo): A kotatsu-themed monster with the power of the Kotatsu Toziru Gear (コタツトジルギア, Kotatsu Tojiru Gia), which contains the parallel world of Kotatsutopia (コタツトピア). He is destroyed by Zenkai Juran. Voiced by Daisuke Hirakawa (平川 大輔, Hirakawa Daisuke), who also voices Dai Kotatsu World.
- Mukaikaze World (ムカイカゼワルド, Mukaikaze Warudo): A headwind-themed monster with the power of the Mukaikaze Toziru Gear (ムカイカゼトジルギア, Mukaikaze Tojiru Gia), which contains the parallel world of Mukaikazetopia (ムカイカゼトピア). He is destroyed by the Zenkaigers. Voiced by Nobuyuki Hiyama (檜山 修之, Hiyama Nobuyuki), who also voices Dai Mukaikaze World.
- SD World (SDワルド, Esu Dī Warudo): A SD-themed monster with the power of the SD Toziru Gear (SDトジルギア, Esu Dī Tojiru Gia), which contains the parallel world of SDtopia (SDトピア, Esu Dītopia). He is destroyed by Twokaizer. Voiced by Naoya Uchida (内田 直哉, Uchida Naoya), who also voices Dai SD World.
- Omikuji World (オミクジワルドワルド, Omikuji Warudo): An omikuji-themed monster with the power of the Omikuji Toziru Gear (オミクジトジルギア, Omikuji Tojiru Gia), which contains the parallel world of Omikujitopia (オミクジトピア). He is destroyed by Zenkai Magine. Voiced by Daisuke Sakaguchi (阪口 大助, Sakaguchi Daisuke), who also voices Dai Omikuji World.
- Ninjin World (ニンジンワルド, Ninjin Warudo): A carrot-themed monster with the power of the Ninjin Toziru Gear (ニンジントジルギア, Ninjin Tojiru Gia), which contains the parallel world of Ninjintopia (ニンジントピア). He is destroyed by the Zenkaigers. Voiced by Hiroyuki Komatō (駒東 寛之, Komatō Hiroyuki), who also voices Dai Ninjin World.
- Sapphire World (サファイアワルド, Safaia Warudo): A sapphire-themed monster with the power of the Sapphire Toziru Gear (サファイアトジルギア, Safaia Tojiru Gia), which contains the parallel world of Sapphiretopia (サファイアトピア, Safaiatopia). He is destroyed by Super Zenkaizer. Voiced by Takuma Yoshida (吉田 拓真, Yoshida Takuma), who also voices Dai Sapphire World.
- Koumori World (コウモリワルド, Kōmori Warudo): A bat-themed monster with the power of the Koumori Toziru Gear (コウモリトジルギア, Kōmori Tojiru Gia), which contains the parallel world of Koumoritopia (コウモリトピア, Kōmoritopia). He is destroyed by the Zenkaigers. Voiced by Shinjirō Sakurai (櫻井 慎二朗, Sakurai Shinjirō), who also voices Dai Koumori World.

===== Other Worlds =====
- Super Warumono World (スーパー悪者ワルド, Sūpā Warumono Warudo): A special World whose body is an amalgamation of parts based on the main villains of all previous Super Sentai series. He is destroyed by the Zenkaigers. This World appears exclusively in the film Kikai Sentai Zenkaiger the Movie: Red Battle! All Sentai Great Assemble!! and is voiced by Tomokazu Seki (関 智一, Seki Tomokazu).
- Normal Warumono World (ノーマル悪者ワルド, Nōmaru Warumono Warudo): A weaker version of Super Warumono World. Though he is defeated by Zenkaizer and Zenkai Red, he enlarges before being destroyed by ZenkaiOh JuraGaon. This World appears exclusively in the web-exclusive series Kikai Sentai Zenkaiger Spin-Off: Zenkai Red Great Introduction! and is also voiced by Tomokazu Seki.
- Kickboxing World (キックボクシングワルド, Kikkubokushingu Warudo): A kickboxing-themed monster with the power of the Kickboxing Toziru Gear (キックボクシングトジルギア, Kikkubokushingu Tojiru Gia), which contains the parallel world of Kickboxingtopia (キックボクシングトピア, Kikkubokushingutopia), who resembles Boxing World. He is left behind and replaced by his Kudaitest counterpart. This World appears exclusively in Kikai Sentai Zenkaiger: Secret Zenkai File Ep. 2.
- Presski World (プレスキワルド, Puresuki Warudo): A machine press-themed monster with the power of the Presski Toziru Gear (プレスキトジルギア, Puresuki Tojiru Gia), which contains the parallel world of Presskitopia (プレスキトピア, Puresukitopia), who resembles Koori World. He is left behind and replaced by his Kudaitest counterpart. This World appears exclusively in Kikai Sentai Zenkaiger: Secret Zenkai File Ep. 3.
- Sakuramochi World (サクラモチワルド, Sakuramochi Warudo): A sakuramochi-themed monster with the power of the Sakuramochi Toziru Gear (サクラモチトジルギア, Sakuramochi Tojiru Gia), which contains the parallel world of Sakuramochitopia (サクラモチトピア), who resembles Kashiwamochi World. He is defeated by Twokaizer alongside Taiyou World. This World appears exclusively in Kikai Sentai Zenkaiger: Secret Zenkai File Ep. 4.
- Taiyou World (タイヨウワルド, Taiyō Warudo): A sun-themed monster with the power of the Taiyou Toziru Gear (タイヨウトジルギア, Taiyō Tojiru Gia), which contains the parallel world of Taiyoutopia (タイヨウトピア, Taiyōtopia), who resembles Mahiru World. He is defeated by Twokaizer alongside Sakuramochi World. This World appears exclusively in Kikai Sentai Zenkaiger: Secret Zenkai File Ep. 4.
- Orihime World (オリヒメワルド, Orihime Warudo): A weaver-girl-themed monster with the power of the Orihime Toziru Gear (オリヒメトジルギア, Orihime Tojiru Gia), which contains the parallel world of Orihimetopia (オリヒメトピア), and is the counterpart of Hikoboshi World. He is destroyed by Twokaizer and Kamen Rider Saber. This World appears exclusively in a special episode of Kamen Rider Saber and is voiced by Sōichirō Hoshi.
- Rider World (ライダーワルド, Raidā Warudo): A Kamen Rider Saber-themed special World that Asmodeus created to serve him. He is destroyed by Kamen Riders 1 and Blades. This World appears exclusively in the crossover film Saber + Zenkaiger: Super Hero Senki and is voiced by Atsushi Yanaka (谷中 敦, Yanaka Atsushi).
- Kaitou World (カイトウワルド, Kaitō Warudo): A phantom thief-themed monster with the power of the Kaitou Toziru Gear (カイトウトジルギア, Kaitō Tojiru Gia), which contains the parallel world of Kaitoutopia (カイトウトピア, Kaitōtopia), who resembles Toumei World. He is left behind and replaced by his Kudaitest counterpart. This World appears exclusively in Kikai Sentai Zenkaiger: Secret Zenkai File Ep. 5.
- Kalbi World (カルビワルド, Karubi Warudo): A galbi-themed monster with the power of the Kalbi Toziru Gear (カルビトジルギア, Karubi Tojiru Gia), which contains the parallel world of Kalbitopia (カルビトピア, Karubitopia). He is destroyed by the Zenkaigers, Kirameki Twokaizer, Stacaesar, and the Kiramagers alongside Dr. Iokaru. This World appears exclusively in the V-Cinema Kikai Sentai Zenkaiger vs. Kiramager vs. Senpaiger and is voiced by Takashi Nagasako (長嶝 高士, Nagasako Takashi).

==== Dai Worlds ====
The Dai Worlds (ダイワルド, Dai Warudo) are Tozitend's giant monsters created when a Kudaitest or a New Kudaitest absorbs a World's Toziru Gear after the monster is destroyed. Like their smaller counterparts, Dai Worlds can greatly alter their surroundings to reflect the parallel world sealed within their Toziru Gear. Once the Toziru Gear is destroyed, the parallel world sealed within it is set free.

- Dai Kinoko World (ダイキノコワルド, Dai Kinoko Warudo): A mushroom-themed giant monster with the power of the Kinoko Toziru Gear. He is destroyed by ZenkaiOh JuraGaon.
- Dai Koori World (ダイコオリワルド, Dai Kōri Warudo): An ice-themed giant monster with the power of the Koori Toziru Gear. He is destroyed by ZenkaiOh JuraGaon.
- Dai Boxing World (ダイボクシングワルド, Dai Bokushingu Warudo): A boxing-themed giant monster with the power of the Boxing Toziru Gear. He is destroyed by ZenkaiOh VrooMagine.
- Dai Sushi World (ダイスシワルド, Dai Sushi Warudo): A sushi-themed giant monster with the power of the Sushi Toziru Gear. He is destroyed by ZenkaiOh JuraGaon and ZenkaiOh VrooMagine.
- Dai Gomi World (ダイゴミワルド, Dai Gomi Warudo): A garbage-themed giant monster with the power of the Gomi Toziru Gear. He is destroyed by ZenkaiOh VrooMagine.
- Dai Door World (ダイドアワルド, Dai Doa Warudo): A door-themed giant monster with the power of the Door Toziru Gear. He is destroyed by ZenkaiOh JuraGaon and ZenkaiOh VrooMagine.
- Dai Kashiwamochi World (ダイカシワモチワルド, Dai Kashiwamochi Warudo): A kashiwa mochi-themed giant monster with the power of the Kashiwamochi Toziru Gear. He is destroyed by ZenkaiOh JuraGaon.
- Dai Mahiru World (ダイマヒルワルド, Dai Mahiru Warudo): A daytime-themed giant monster with the power of the Mahiru Toziru Gear. He is destroyed by ZenkaiOh VrooMagine.
- Dai Onigokko World (ダイオニゴッコワルド, Dai Onigokko Warudo): A tag-themed giant monster with the power of the Onigokko Toziru Gear. He is destroyed by his bomb.
- Dai Katatsumuri World (ダイカタツムリワルド, Dai Katatsumuri Warudo): A snail-themed giant monster with the power of the Katatsumuri Toziru Gear. He is destroyed by TwokaiOh Cutanner.
- Dai Recycle World (ダイリサイクルワルド, Dai Risaikuru Warudo): A recycling-themed giant monster with the power of the Recycle Toziru Gear. He is destroyed by Battle Caesar Robo.
- Dai Retro World (ダイレトロワルド, Dai Retoro Warudo): A retro style-themed giant monster with the power of the Retro Toziru Gear. He is destroyed by ZenkaiOh JuraGaon and TwokaiOh Cutanner.
- Dai Jishaku World (ダイジシャクワルド, Dai Jishaku Warudo): A magnet-themed giant monster with the power of the Jishaku Toziru Gear. He is destroyed by the enlarged Kikainoid Zenkaigers.
- Dai Toumei World (ダイトウメイワルド, Dai Tōmei Warudo): A transparency-themed giant monster with the power of the Toumei Toziru Gear. He is destroyed by TwokaiOh Ricky.
- Dai Renai World (ダイレンアイワルド, Dai Ren'ai Warudo): A falling in love-themed giant monster with the power of the Renai Toziru Gear. He is destroyed by ZenkaiOh JuraGaon, ZenkaiOh VrooMagine, and TwokaiOh Cutanner.
- Dai Kabutomushi World (ダイカブトムシワルド, Dai Kabutomushi Warudo): A rhinoceros beetle-themed giant monster with the power of the Kabutomushi Toziru Gear. He is destroyed by ZenkaiOh JuraGaon and ZenkaiOh VrooMagine.
- Dai Hikoboshi World (ダイヒコボシワルド, Dai Hikoboshi Warudo): A cowherd-themed giant monster with the power of the Hikoboshi Toziru Gear. He is destroyed by ZenkaiOh VrooMagine and TwokaiOh Cutanner.
- Dai Copy World (ダイコピーワルド, Dai Kopī Warudo): A copying-themed giant monster with the power of the Copy Toziru Gear. He is destroyed by ZenkaijuOh.
- Dai Tougyu World (ダイトウギュウワルド, Dai Tōgyū Warudo): A bullfighting-themed giant monster with the power of the Tougyu Toziru Gear. He is destroyed by ZenkaijuOh.
- Dai Vacances World (ダイバカンスワルド, Dai Bakansu Warudo): A vacation-themed giant monster with the power of the Vacances Toziru Gear. He is destroyed by ZenkaijuOh.
- Dai Manga World (ダイマンガワルド, Dai Manga Warudo): A manga-themed giant monster with the power of the Manga Toziru Gear. He is destroyed by ZenkaijuOh.
- Dai Tennis World (ダイテニスワルド, Dai Tenisu Warudo): A tennis-themed giant monster with the power of the Tennis Toziru Gear. He is destroyed by ZenkaiOh VrooMagine.
- Dai Kaki World (ダイカキワルド, Dai Kaki Warudo): A persimmon-themed giant monster with the power of the Hoshigaki Toziru Gear. He is destroyed by ZenkaijuOh.
- Dai Gyunyu World (ダイギュウニュウワルド, Dai Gyū'nyū Warudo): A cow's milk-themed giant monster with the power of the Gyunyu Toziru Gear. He is destroyed by the Zenryoku Eagle.
- Dai Sakasama World (ダイサカサマワルド, Dai Sakasama Warudo): An inversion-themed giant monster with the power of the Sakasama Toziru Gear. He is destroyed by Zenryoku ZenkaiOh.
- Dai Gakuen World (ダイガクエンワルド, Dai Gakuen Warudo): A school-themed giant monster with the power of the Gakuen Toziru Gear. He is destroyed by ZenkaiOh VrooMagine and ZenkaijuOh.
- Dai Halloween World (ダイハロウィンワルド, Dai Harowin Warudo): A Halloween-themed giant monster with the power of the Halloween Toziru Gear. He is destroyed by ZenkaijuOh.
- Dai Dia World (ダイダイヤワルド, Dai Daiya Warudo): A diamond-themed giant monster with the power of the Dia Toziru Gear. He is destroyed by Zenryoku ZenkaiOh.
- Dai Bikkuribako World (ダイビックリバコワルド, Dai Bikkuribako Warudo): A jack-in-the-box-themed giant monster with the power of the Bikkuribako Toziru Gear. He is destroyed by ZenkaijuOh.
- Dai Daikon World (ダイダイコンワルド, Dai Bikkuribako Warudo): A daikon-themed giant monster with the power of the Daikon Toziru Gear. He is destroyed by Zenryoku ZenkaiOh.
- Dai Bon World (ダイボンワルド, Dai Bon Warudo): A Bon Festival-themed giant monster with the power of the Bon Toziru Gear. He is destroyed by ZenkaijuOh.
- Dai Shougatsu World (ダイショウガツワルド, Dai Shōgatsu Warudo): A Japanese New Year-themed giant monster with the power of the Shougatsu Toziru Gear. He is destroyed by ZenkaiOh JuraGaon, ZenkaiOh VrooMagine, and TwokaiOh Cutanner.
- Dai Men World (ダイメンワルド, Dai Men Warudo): A noodle-themed giant monster with the power of the Men Toziru Gear. He is destroyed by his noodles.
- Dai Kotatsu World (ダイコタツワルド, Dai Kotatsu Warudo): A kotatsu-themed giant monster with the power of the Kotatsu Toziru Gear. He is destroyed by Don ZenkaiOh.
- Dai Mukaikaze World (ダイムカイカゼワルド, Dai Mukaikaze Warudo): A headwind-themed giant monster with the power of the Mukaikaze Toziru Gear. He is destroyed by TwokaiOh Ricky.
- Dai SD World (ダイSDワルド, Dai Esu Dī Warudo): A SD-themed giant monster with the power of the SD Toziru Gear. He is destroyed by the enlarged Twokai Cutanner and Twokai Ricky.
- Dai Omikuji World (ダイオミクジワルド, Dai Omikuji Warudo): An omikuji-themed giant monster with the power of the Omikuji Toziru Gear. He is reverted into a Kudaitest by Gege and destroyed by Giant Super Zenkaizer and ZenkaiOh JuraGaon.
- Dai Ninjin World (ダイニンジンワルド, Dai Ninjin Warudo): A carrot-themed giant monster with the power of the Ninjin Toziru Gear. He is destroyed by ZenkaiOh JuraGaon.
- Dai Sapphire World (ダイサファイアワルド, Dai Safaia Warudo): A sapphire-themed giant monster with the power of the Sapphire Toziru Gear. He is destroyed by Giant Super Zenkaizer.
- Dai Koumori World (ダイコウモリワルド, Dai Kōmori Warudo): A bat-themed giant monster with the power of the Koumori Toziru Gear. He is destroyed by ZenkaiOh VrooMagine.

===== Other Dai Worlds =====
- Dai Kickboxing World (ダイキックボクシングワルド, Dai Kikkubokushingu Warudo): A kickboxing-themed giant monster with the power of the Kickboxing Toziru Gear. He is destroyed by ZenkaiOh JuraGaon. He appears exclusively in Kikai Sentai Zenkaiger: Secret Zenkai File Ep. 2.
- Dai Presski World (ダイプレスキワルド, Dai Puresuki Warudo): A machine press-themed giant monster with the power of the Presski Toziru Gear. He is destroyed by ZenkaiOh JuraGaon and ZenkaiOh VrooMagine. He appears exclusively in Kikai Sentai Zenkaiger: Secret Zenkai File Ep. 3.
- Dai Kaitou World (ダイカイトウワルド, Dai Kaitō Warudo): A phantom thief-themed giant monster with the power of the Kaitou Toziru Gear. He is destroyed by ZenkaijuOh. He appears exclusively in Kikai Sentai Zenkaiger: Secret Zenkai File Ep. 5.
- Dai Kalbi World (ダイカルビワルド, Dai Karubi Warudo): A galbi-themed giant monster with the power of the Kalbi Toziru Gear. He is destroyed by Kirameki Zenryoku ZenkaiOh. He appears exclusively in the V-Cinema Kikai Sentai Zenkaiger vs. Kiramager vs. Senpaiger.

=== Goldtsuiker Family ===
The Goldtsuiker Family are Zocks' siblings who, like him, were inspired by stories of the Gokaigers to become World Pirates and support him in his quest to find the SD Toziru Gear.

==== Flint Goldtsuiker ====
Flint Goldtsuiker (フリント・ゴールドツイカー, Furinto Gōrudotsuikā) is Zocks' younger sister. She is well-versed in gear technology, having created the Geardlinger through reverse-engineering of Tozitend's equipment while replicating the Zenkaigers' Sentai Gears for Zocks' own use.

During the events of the stage show Zenkai!! Twokai!? Need for Development!! G-Rosso Last Fight!!, Flint is able to transform into the silver-colored "Invention Power" (発明のパワー, Hatsumei no Pawā), Twokai Flint (ツーカイフリント, Tsūkai Furinto).

During the events of the web-exclusive special Twokaizer × Gokaiger: The Tanuki-Charmed June Bride, Flint utilizes Gai Ikari's Gokai Cellular in conjunction with the Twokaizer Ranger Key, which was temporarily created from the Twokaizer Sentai Gear, to transform into Twokaizer.

Flint Goldtsuiker is portrayed by Hinami Mori (森 日菜美, Mori Hinami). As a child, Flint is portrayed by Hinano Amaya (雨谷 日菜乃, Amaya Hinano).

==== Twokai Cutanner and Twokai Ricky ====
Cutanner Goldtsuiker (カッタナー・ゴールドツイカー, Kattanā Gōrudotsuikā) and Ricky Goldtsuiker (リッキー・ゴールドツイカー, Rikkī Gōrudotsuikā) are Zocks and Flint's younger twin brothers. They were turned into small robots, with Cutanner becoming the red-colored Twokai Cutanner (ツーカイカッタナー, Tsūkai Kattanā) and Ricky becoming the blue-colored Twokai Ricky (ツーカイリッキー, Tsūkai Rikkī), by a curse from the parallel world of SDtopia (SDトピア, Esu Dītopia). After SDtopia was sealed within a Toziru Gear, Cutanner and Ricky accompany their siblings in their quest to find it. Both can fuse with Twokaizer to give him extra abilities and, like the Kikainoid Zenkaigers, they can be enlarged by their brother to assist him in battle. Following Kaito's victory over God, Flint devises a way for them to freely alternate between their human and SD forms.

Twokai Cutanner and Twokai Ricky are voiced by Ryōta Suzuki (鈴木 崚汰, Suzuki Ryōta) and Satsumi Matsuda (松田 颯水, Matsuda Satsumi), respectively. In their original forms, Cutanner and Ricky are portrayed by Kōsei Sutō (須東 煌世, Sutō Kōsei).

=== God ===
A mysterious entity who claims to be God and the creator of the multiverse. Believing he had too many worlds to care for, he possesses Gege to manipulate Tozitend into sealing them for him and bring them under his control. Amidst this, he later takes an interest in Stacy, possessing his body to meet the Zenkaigers while displaying his ability to release or destroy parallel worlds contained in the Toziru Gears. He helps the Zenkaigers destroy Tozitend before possessing Kaito and sealing all of the dimensions. But Kaito breaks free and eventually defeats God in a Rock Paper Scissors match, with the being accepting his loss and allows Kaito to unseal the worlds.

== Guest characters ==
- Sword of Logos (ソードオブロゴス, Sōdo Obu Rogosu): An organization of swordsmen that hails from the World of Saber.
  - Reika Shindai (神代 玲花, Shindai Reika): An assassin-class fencer of the Sword of Logos who can transform into Kamen Rider Sabela (仮面ライダーサーベラ, Kamen Raidā Sābera). After Zocks comes to her world and steals her brother Ryoga's Wonder Ride Book, the Shindai siblings pursue the pirate to the Zenkaigers' world where Hikoboshi World kidnaps her. Reika joins forces with Magine and their fellow captives to escape before rejoining their allies and returning to her own world with Ryoga. Reika Shindai is portrayed by Mei Angela (アンジェラ 芽衣, Anjera Mei), who reprises her role from Kamen Rider Saber.
  - Ryoga Shindai (神代 凌牙, Shindai Ryōga): A paladin of the Sword of Logos who can transform into Kamen Rider Durendal (仮面ライダーデュランダル, Kamen Raidā Dyurandaru). After Zocks comes to his world and steals his Wonder Ride Book, he and his sister Reika pursue the pirate to the Zenkaigers' World, only to join forces with him and the Zenkaigers to defeat Hikoboshi World. After earning Zocks' respect, Ryoga regains his Wonder Ride Book and returns to his world with Reika. Ryoga Shindai is portrayed by Ken Shonozaki (庄野崎 謙, Shōnozaki Ken), who reprises his role from Kamen Rider Saber.
- Don Momotaro (ドンモモタロウ, Don Momotarō): The leader of the 47th Super Sentai team, Avataro Sentai Donbrothers. Using the Donbrothers Sentai Gear, Kaito summons him to help Juran defeat Kotatsu World and Dai Kotatsu World. Don Momotaro is voiced by Kouhei Higuchi (樋口 幸平, Higuchi Kōhei), ahead of his appearance in Avataro Sentai Donbrothers.

== Spin-off characters ==
=== Zenkai Red ===
Zenkai Red (ゼンカイレッド, Zenkai Reddo) is a mysterious unnamed man who wants to replace Kaito as the Zenkaigers' leader. He was given a Geartlinger and a Sentai Gear by Normal Warumono World, who sought to use him as a pawn in an attempt to break up the Zenkaigers. After helping them defeat Normal Warumono World, Zenkai Red tells the Zenkaigers he will reveal his real name once he becomes their leader before leaving. He appears exclusively in the web-exclusive series Kikai Sentai Zenkaiger Spin-Off: Zenkai Red Great Introduction!.

The mysterious man can transform into the "Red Power" (レッドのパワー, Reddo no Pawā), Zenkai Red. Unlike the primary Zenkaigers, he is capable of generating an energy blade from his Geartlinger that can be used as a bayonet, though he is over-reliant on his powers in combat due to being physically weaker than them.

Zenkai Red is portrayed by Daiki Ise (伊勢 大貴, Ise Daiki).

=== Pottodeus ===
Pottodeus (ポットデウス, Pottodeusu) is a lonely and timid Kikainoid who is tricked by Dr. Iokaru into believing he is the son of Bokkowaus and appears exclusively in the V-Cinema Kikai Sentai Zenkaiger vs. Kiramager vs. Senpaiger. Pottodeus intends to become the new ruler of Tozitend until Iokaru betrays him. Following Iokaru's defeat, Stacy gives Pottodeus a chance to atone for his deeds.

Pottodeus is voiced by Nobuhiko Okamoto (岡本 信彦, Okamoto Nobuhiko).

=== Dr. Iokaru ===
Dr. Iokaru (Dr.イオカル, Dokutā Iokaru) is a scientist from the parallel world of Kitsunetopia (キツネトピア) who plans to dominate all of the parallel worlds with the power of the four Kanaema Stones and appears exclusively in the V-Cinema Kikai Sentai Zenkaiger vs. Kiramager vs. Senpaiger. As part of his plan, he uses Pottodeus as a figurehead for Tozitend while posing as his ally and creates gears based on Toziru Gears. After betraying Pottodeus, Iokaru is destroyed by the Zenkaigers, Kirameki Twokaizer, Stacaesar, and the Kiramagers alongside Kalbi World.

Dr. Iokaru is voiced by Shinnosuke Tachibana (立花 慎之介, Tachibana Shinnosuke).

=== Doetamu ===
Doetamu (ドエタム) is a jeweler from the parallel world of Tanukitopia (タヌキトピア) who appears exclusively in the web-exclusive series Twokaizer × Gokaiger: The Tanuki-Charmed June Bride. He brainwashes female pirates into becoming his wives until he is destroyed by Flint as Twokaizer and Gokai Pink.

Doetamu is voiced by Jun Fukuyama (福山 潤, Fukuyama Jun).
