= List of Avataro Sentai Donbrothers characters =

Avataro Sentai Donbrothers (暴太郎戦隊ドンブラザーズ, Abatarō Sentai Donburazāzu) is a Japanese tokusatsu series that serves as the 46th installment in the Super Sentai franchise and the third entry in the Reiwa era. The series also acts as a sequel for the previous entry, Kikai Sentai Zenkaiger.

== Main characters ==
=== Donbrothers ===
The eponymous Donbrothers are five individuals who join to rescue humans who turned into monsters called "Hitotsuki" while protecting them from alien beings called "Nouto". They utilize Avataro Gears (アバタロウギア, Abatarō Gia) in conjunction with the Don Blaster (ドンブラスター, Don Burasutā) sidearm to transform into forms based on characters of the Momotarō folktale, in a similar fashion to the Zenkaigers' Sentai Gear system. Like the Sentai Gears, the Avataro Gears usually stored in the Donbro Buckle (ドンブラバックル, Donbura Bakkuru) belt also include legend items based on the Donbrothers' 46 Super Sentai predecessors that allow them to assume the form of a past Sentai team, with the limitation that each Donbrother can only transform into a past Sentai member of the same color (the only exceptions are Taro, who in addition to past red warriors can transform into the white-colored Zenkaizer, and (Dark) Jiro, who can transform into any past Sentai team's sixth member regardless of color). In civilian form, they can still see the Anoni in their true forms and use the Nouto Layer for fast traveling with special sunglasses each of them possess.

==== Taro Momoi ====
Found in a peach-shaped capsule as a baby and raised by Jin, Taro Momoi (桃井 タロウ, Momoi Tarō) is 21 years old and lives alone, working part-time at the Shirokuma Express (シロクマ宅配便, Shirokuma Takuhaibin) delivery firm, but in reality, he just a lonely, cold person. He eventually loses all of his memories and works at the Shirousagi Express (シロウサギ宅配便, Shirousagi Takuhaibin) delivery firm. Taro regains all of his memories a year later through Kaito's help and returns to his life as the Donbrothers' leader.

Taro can transform into the red-colored Don Momotaro (ドンモモタロウ, Don Momotarō). While transformed, he wields the Zanglassword (ザングラソード, Zangurasōdo) katana. He also rides the Enya Rideon (エンヤライドン, En'ya Raidon) motorcycle, which forms the right half of Don ZenkaiOh. Additionally, he can assume the following forms:

- Don Momotaro Alter (ドンモモタロウアルター, Don Momotarō Arutā): Taro's small-sized mecha form accessed from his personal Avataro Gear Alter that can switch between peach and humanoid modes.
  - Don ToQ Momotaro Alter (ドントッキュウモモタロウアルター, Don Tokkyū Momotarō Arutā): A tank-themed combination of Don Momotaro Alter and the ToQger Alter.
  - Don Zyuoh Momotaro Alter (ドンジュウオウモモタロウアルター, Don Jūō Momotarō Arutā): A bird-themed combination of Don Momotaro Alter and the Zyuohger Alter.
  - Don Ryusoul Momotaro Alter (ドンリュウソウモモタロウアルター, Don Ryūsō Momotarō Arutā): A centaur-themed combination of Don Momotaro Alter and the Ryusoulger Alter.
- Don Robotaro (ドンロボタロウ, Don Robotarō): Taro's Momotarō-themed mecha form accessed from his personal Robotaro Gear (ロボタロウギア, Robotarō Gia) that forms the head, torso, and upper legs of Don Onitaijin.
- Goldon Momotaro (ゴールドンモモタロウ, Gōrudon Momotarō): Taro's power-up form accessed from the small-sized Omikoshi Phoenix (オミコシフェニックス, Omikoshi Fenikkusu) mecha that grants photokinesis and the ability to generate peach-like force fields.
- Don Zenkai Momotaro (ドンゼンカイモモタロウ, Don Zenkai Momotarō): A special form accessed from a variant of the Zanglassword called the Don Zenkai Blade (ドンゼンカイブレード, Don Zenkai Burēdo), which is summoned through the Victory Super Gear (ビクトリースーパーギア, Bikutorī Sūpā Gia), that clads Taro in Zenkaizer's armor and cape. This form appears exclusively in the V-Cinema Avataro Sentai Donbrothers vs. Zenkaiger
- Goldon Momotaro Ohger (ゴールドンモモタロオージャー, Gōrudon Momotaro Ōjā): A special form accessed from the Don Ohger Crown (ドンオージャクラウン, Don Ōja Kuraun) that clads Taro in King Kuwagata Ohger's armor and cape. This form appears exclusively in the V-Cinema Ohsama Sentai King-Ohger vs. Donbrothers.

During the events of the web-exclusive special Avataro Sentai Donbrothers vs. Avataro Sentai Donburies, Taro transforms into an alternate version of Don Momotaro known as Tekkadon Red (鉄火丼レッド, Tekkadon Reddo).

Taro Momoi is portrayed by Kouhei Higuchi (樋口 幸平, Higuchi Kōhei). As a child, Taro is portrayed by Kira Miura (三浦 綺羅, Miura Kira).

==== Shinichi Saruhara ====
Shinichi Saruhara (猿原 真一, Saruhara Shin'ichi) is a 21-year-old wise but eccentric young man who is the brains of the team. He never had a job and maintains himself with gifts from those he helps with his wisdom. (Note: Shinichi Saruhara was born on March 6, 2001 and turns 21 during episode 1, before his debut.) During Jiro's takeover as the Donbrothers' leader, Shinichi runs a private school of his own.

Shinichi can transform into the blue-colored, burly Saru Brother (サルブラザー, Saru Burazā). While transformed, he gains superhuman strength. He can also use his personal Robotaro Gear to transform into the gorilla-themed Saru Brother Robotaro (サルブラザーロボタロウ, Saru Burazā Robotarō) mecha, which forms the arms and torso plate of Don Onitaijin.

During the events of the web-exclusive special Avataro Sentai Donbrothers vs. Avataro Sentai Donburies, Shinichi transforms into an alternate version of Saru Brother known as Tendon Blue (天丼ブルー, Tendon Burū).

Shinichi Saruhara is portrayed by Yuuki Beppu (別府 由来, Beppu Yūki).

==== Haruka Kitou ====
Haruka Kitou (鬼頭 はるか, Kitō Haruka) is the main viewpoint character of the show (though Taro is the actual protagonist). A 17-year-old clueless student at Tsunokado High School (津野角高校, Tsunokado Kōkō) and aspiring manga artist who lives with her aunt, Yuriko. Just after receiving an important prize of her debut work, First Love Hero (初恋ヒーロー, Hatsukoi Hīrō), her career was destroyed when she was falsely accused of plagiarism by mysterious manga artist Naoki Shiina and now works part-time at the Donbura coffee shop, initially unaware of Kaito's secret identity as Zenkaizer Black. (Note: Haruka Kitou was born on May 25, 2004 and turned 18 during the series.) Haruka would later learn that Naoki Shiina is actually a version of herself from the future of a parallel universe, though upset that her alternate future self failed to clear her name before leaving. At the end of the series, Haruka continues her work with Sonoza's help, and publishes her award-winning manga based on the Donbrothers' adventures, this time without consequences.

Haruka can transform into the yellow-colored Oni Sister (オニシスター, Oni Shisutā). While transformed, she wields the Full Konbou (フルコンボウ, Furu Konbō) kanabō. She can also use her personal Robotaro Gear to transform into the oni-themed Oni Sister Robotaro (オニシスターロボタロウ, Oni Shisutā Robotarō) mecha, which forms the right lower leg of Don Onitaijin.

During the events of the web-exclusive special Avataro Sentai Donbrothers vs. Avataro Sentai Donburies, Haruka transforms into an alternate version of One Sister known as Katsudon Yellow (カツ丼イエロー, Katsudon Ierō).

Haruka Kitou is portrayed by Kohaku Shida (志田 こはく, Shida Kohaku).

==== Tsubasa Inuzuka ====
Tsubasa Inuzuka (犬塚 翼, Inuzuka Tsubasa) is a 24-year-old struggling actor who became a fugitive after being falsely accused of putting his theater troupe in a coma and the disappearance of his girlfriend Natsumi, the true culprit being the Crane Juto. (Note: Tsubasa Inuzuka was born on April 3, 1997 and turned 25 in episode 5.) His search for Natsumi leads him to the Crane Juto after she assumed the identity of Miho Kijino, putting him at odds with Tsuyoshi. Despite having later cleared his name, Tsubasa becomes a fugitive again as the compensation for using his Kibi-Points to save Sononi's life. This resulted in costing his relationship with Natsumi, but decides to let her go knowing she'll be more happier with Tsuyoshi. At the end of series, he is still currently on the run, this time with his new love interest Sononi. During Jiro's takeover as the Donbrothers' leader, Tsubasa and Sononi run a pastry shop together before they resume their lives as fugitives.

Tsubasa can transform into the black-colored, diminutive Inu Brother (イヌブラザー, Inu Burazā). While transformed, he wields a giant shuriken. He can also use his personal Robotaro Gear to transform into the dog-themed Inu Brother Robotaro (イヌブラザーロボタロウ, Inu Burazā Robotarō) mecha, which forms the left lower leg of Don Onitaijin.

During the events of the web-exclusive special Avataro Sentai Donbrothers vs. Avataro Sentai Donburies, Tsubasa transforms into an alternate version of Inu Brother known as Kaisendon Black (海鮮丼ブラック, Kaisendon Burakku).

Tsubasa Inuzuka is portrayed by Totaro (柊太朗, Tōtarō).

==== Tsuyoshi Kijino ====
Tsuyoshi Kijino (雉野 つよし, Kijino Tsuyoshi) is a 33-year-old just-married employee of the Pheasant Consultant (フェズントコンサルタント, Fezunto Konsarutanto) company who works to support his wife, Miho. (Note: Tsuyoshi Kijino's birthday is November 3, 1988.) Unaware of his wife's true nature as a Juto, Tsuyoshi is so protective of Miho that he is usually violent towards anyone who threatens her and even turns into a Hitotsuki a few times out of his desire to protect her or stay by her side, until he is finally convinced by the other Donbrothers that she was a Juto in disguise, leaving him devastated. Tsuyoshi then quits his job and decides to move from the apartment he shared with Miho, until he is approached by Natsumi, who shared her memories with Miho while she was being held hostage and decided to live with him. During Jiro's takeover as the Donbrothers' leader, Tsuyoshi serves as president of Pheasant Consultant.

Tsuyoshi can transform into the pink-colored, tall and thin Kiji Brother (キジブラザー, Kiji Burazā). While transformed, he gains flight capabilities. He can also use his personal Robotaro Gear to transform into the pheasant-themed Kiji Brother Robotaro (キジブラザーロボタロウ, Kiji Burazā Robotarō) mecha, which forms the shoulder armor of Don Onitaijin.

During the events of the web-exclusive special Avataro Sentai Donbrothers vs. Avataro Sentai Donburies, Tsuyoshi transforms into an alternate version of Kiji Brother known as Gyudon Pink (牛丼ピンク, Gyūdon Pinku).

Tsuyoshi Kijino is portrayed by Hirofumi Suzuki (鈴木 浩文, Suzuki Hirofumi).

==== Jiro Momotani ====
Jiro Momotani (桃谷 ジロウ, Momotani Jirō) is a 21-year-old aspiring hero who met Taro once in high school, having a similar origin in found in a peach-shaped capsule as a baby and raised by Terasaki in a village facility. He left his village following Taro's disappearance, claiming it to be a voice in his head urging him to become a hero. He would eventually learn the truth of his adopted parent being a Juto and his hometown being a fabrication, which leaves him devastated, until he and Dark Jiro decide to move on with their lives by fusing both personalities into one. Following Taro's disappearance, Jiro gained great support from Kentarō Gōda, who once became the Hitotsuki Denjiki, and took over as the Donbrothers' leader for the period of one year before Taro makes his return as the team's leader.

Unlike the primary Donbrothers, Jiro utilizes the Ryuko no Geki (龍虎之戟, Ryūkonogeki) ji, which can switch between Spear Mode (矛モード, Hoko Mōdo) and Axe Mode (アックスモード, Akkusu Mōdo), to transform into the gold-colored Don Doragoku (ドンドラゴクウ, Don Doragokū). While transformed, he primarily wields the Ryuko no Geki in Spear Mode. He is also equipped with the gong-like Tiguardora (虎的盾鑼(タイガードラ), Taigādora) buckler, which stores his Avataro Gears and allows him to transform into the sixth members of past Sentai teams. Additionally, he can assume the following forms:

- Don Doragoku Alter (ドンドラゴクウアルター, Don Doragokū Arutā): Jiro's small-sized mecha form accessed from his personal Avataro Gear Alter that can switch between dragon and humanoid modes.
  - Don Ninnin Doragoku Alter (ドンニンニンドラゴクウアルター, Don Ninnin Doragokū Arutā): A combination of Don Doragoku Alter and the Ninninger Alter.
- Don Robogoku (ドンロボゴクウ, Don Robogokū): Jiro's dragon-themed mecha form accessed from his personal Robotaro Gear that forms the helmet, visor, outer arms, chest armor, back, and lower legs of Toradoragonjin.
- Goldon Doragoku (ゴールドンドラゴクウ, Gōrudon Doragokū): Jiro's power-up form accessed from a Robotaro Gear which the small-sized Donburi Phoenix (丼フェニックス, Donburi Fenikkusu) mecha changes into that grants similar capabilities as Goldon Momotaro. This form appears exclusively in the web-exclusive special Avataro Sentai Donbrothers vs. Avataro Sentai Donburies. (Note: Also written as ゴール丼ドラゴクウ)

Jiro Momotani is portrayed by Raizou Ishikawa (石川 雷蔵, Ishikawa Raizō). As a child and a teenager, Jiro is portrayed by Ryūto Gotō (後藤 りゅうと, Gotō Ryūto) and Yū Mizusawa (水澤 優海, Mizusawa Yū) respectively.

===== Dark Jiro =====
Dark Jiro (闇ジロウ, Yami Jirō), also known as "Dangerous Jiro" (危ないジロウ, Abunai Jirō) by Haruka, is Jiro Momotani's overly-competitive original personality whom everyone assumed was a manifestation of Jiro's desire to become a hero taken to the most extreme.

Similarly to his alternate personality, Dark Jiro utilizes the Ryuko no Geki to transform into the silver-colored Don Torabolt (ドントラボルト, Don Toraboruto). While transformed, he primarily wields the Ryuko no Geki in Axe Mode. He is also equipped with the Tiguardora. Additionally, he can use his personal Robotaro Gear to transform into the tiger-themed Don Robobolt (ドンロボボルト, Don Roboboruto) mecha, which forms the head, inner torso, inner arms, and upper legs of Toradoragonjin.

As with the original Jiro, Dark Jiro is also portrayed by Raizou Ishikawa.

==== Alters ====
Using Avataro Gear Alters (アバタロウギアアルター, Abatarō Gia Arutā), Don Momotaro Alter and Don Doragoku Alter can summon other small-sized mecha based on mecha pertaining to the previous Super Sentai that can also combine with them for enhanced capabilities.

- ToQger Alter (トッキュウジャーアルター, Tokkyūjā Arutā): A Red Ressha-themed Alter.
- Zyuohger Alter (ジュウオウジャーアルター, Jūōjā Arutā): A trio of Cube Eagle, Shark, and Lion-themed Alters.
- Ryusoulger Alter (リュウソウジャーアルター, Ryūsōjā Arutā): A Kishiryu Tyramigo-themed Alter.
- Ninninger Alter (ニンニンジャーアルター, Ninninjā Arutā): A Nin Shuriken-themed Alter that can enlarge to serve as a flying vehicle for Don Doragoku to ride into battle.
- Lupinranger Alter (ルパンレンジャーアルター, Rupanrenjā Arutā): A Red Dial Fighter-themed Alter.
- Patranger Alter (パトレンジャーアルター, Patorenjā Arutā): A Trigger Machine 1gou-themed Alter.

===== Good Strike Bazooka =====
The Good Strike Bazooka (グッドストライクバズーカ, Guddo Sutoraiku Bazūka) is a Good Striker-themed combination of the Lupinranger and Patranger Alters.

==== Great Combinations ====
While in their Robotaro forms, the Donbrothers can be assembled and enlarged into giant robots via Great Combination (大合体, Dai Gattai).

- Don ZenkaiOh (ドンゼンカイオー, Don Zenkaiō): Don Momotaro's personal giant robot composed of his enlarged Enya Rideon and Juran Tyranno via Don Zenkai Combination (ドン全界合体, Don Zenkai Gattai) that is equipped with the wrist-mounted Avatar Sword (アバターソード, Abatā Sōdo) and Avatar Shield (アバターシールド, Abatā Shīrudo). This combination first appears in episode 42 of Kikai Sentai Zenkaiger.
- Don Onitaijin (ドンオニタイジン): The Donbrothers' giant robot composed of the primary members' Robotaro forms that dual wields the twin Kijin Swords (キジンソード, Kijin Sōdo).
  - Goldon Onitaijin (ゴールドンオニタイジン, Gōrudon Onitaijin): The Omikoshi Great Combination (おみこし大合体, Omikoshi Dai Gattai) of Don Onitaijin and an enlarged Omikoshi Phoenix when the Avataro Kiwami (暴太郎極, Abatarō Kiwami) Robotaro Gear is used that wields the Goldon Lance (ゴールドンランス, Gōrudon Ransu) and the Goldon Shield (ゴールドンシールド, Gōrudon Shīrudo).
- Toradoragonjin (虎龍攻神(トラドラゴンジン)): Don Doragoku and Torabolt's personal giant robot composed of their Robotaro forms that wields the Netsuretsu Kangeki (熱烈貫戟) sword and the Aegis Toraiger (神盾撃器(イージストライガー), Ījisu Toraigā) claw.
- Toradora Onitaijin (トラドラオニタイジン): The Transcendent Great Combination (超絶大合体, Chōzetsu Dai Gattai) of Don Onitaijin and Toradoragonjin that wields the Kijin Spear (キジンスピア, Kijin Supia). It can also ride the Avatar Horse (アバターホース, Abatā Hōsu).
  - Toradora Onitaijin Kiwami (トラドラオニタイジン極): The Ultimate Great Combination (究極大合体, Kyūkyoku Dai Gattai) of Toradora Onitaijin and an enlarged Omikoshi Phoenix when the Avataro Kiwami Robotaro Gear is used that wields the Goldon Lance Kiwami (ゴールドンランス極, Gōrudon Ransu Kiwami).
- Don King-Ohger (ドンキングオージャー, Don Kinguōjā): A combination of King-Ohger and Don Robotaro that replaces the former's head with Don Onitaijin's.

=== Nouto ===
The Nouto (脳人, Nōto; Brain Person) are inhabitants of Ideon (イデオン) within the Nouto Layer (脳人レイヤー, Nōto Reiyā), a higher dimension formed by human thoughts that overlays with the human world. While dependent on human brainwaves for survival, three representatives of the Nouto are sent by a mysterious group known as the "council" to neutralize the Hitotsuki as human desires cause disruptions on their world. The Nouto warriors' tendency to force a host's transformation into a Hitotsuki and their method for teleporting hosts into the space between dimensions that initially appeared to kill their quarry, the Nouto come into conflict with the Donbrothers, which intensifies when they discover that Taro is a survivor from the Don Clan who created the Juto. Despite these events, the Nouto trio end up forming bonds with the Donbrothers, which the council learn of and deploy Sonoshi in an attempt to confirm it. Sonoshi confirmed the trio's transgressions and are condemned as traitors for Sonoshi and their group to exterminate.

Each member carries a Nouto Brace (脳人ブレス, Nōto Buresu), which they utilize to transform into their battle forms that are equipped with the Nouto Shield (脳人シールド, Nōto Shīrudo) on their chests, and can create a door on a person's forehead to determine if their Hitotsuki is about to emerge or not. The Nouto also have a secret method that transplants a Hitotsuki on the verge of maturity from its host into another Nouto who becomes the Hitotsuki's new host.

==== Sonoi ====
Sonoi (ソノイ) (Note: The full names of Sonoi, Sononi, and Sonoza are Duno Dia Socradius Sonoi (デュノ・ディア・ソクラディウス・ソノイ, Duno Dia Sokuradiusu Sonoi), Duno Diantano Elizabethalias Sononi (デュノ・ディアンターノ・エリザベータリアス・ソノニ, Duno Diantāno Erizabētariasu Sononi), and Duno Dia Alexandmastam Sonoza (デュノ・ディア・アレキサンドマスタム・ソノザ, Duno Dia Arekisandomasutamu Sonoza) respectively.) is a composed man interested the human world's art who enjoys watching paintings. While surprisingly heroic and empathetic towards humans as a whole, he loathes greedy humans enough to personally cause their transformation into Hitotsuki so he can capture them. He also forms a complicated friendship with Taro before learning his identity as Don Momotaro and one of the last living members of the Don Clan, deciding to defeat him in battle. The two eventually have a duel that ends with Sonoi's death and Don Murasame spiriting the Nouto's body. Sonoi is later resurrected by the council using Taro's energy, but his personality is similar to Taro's until he is back to his old personality. At some point during Jiro's takeover as the Donbrothers' leader, Sonoi inherited the oden cart that he frequented prior after being kicked off the team in conflict with Jiro. To resurrect Taro, he gives back the energy absorbed from him by the council to revive him, dying in the process. After his death, he runs an oden cart in the land of the dead, Hakabaka.

Sonoi can transform into a navy blue-colored battle form. While transformed, he wields the Baron Sword (バロンソード, Baron Sōdo). After his resurrection, he can transform into a stronger battle form equipped with an upgraded Nouto Shield.

Sonoi is portrayed by Yuya Tominaga (富永 勇也, Tominaga Yūya).

==== Sononi ====
Sononi (ソノニ) is a woman interested in the human society's love affairs who gets close to Tsubasa and grows feelings for him. These feelings motivate her to talk Tsubasa into killing Miho to free Natsumi, not mentioning to him that Natsumi would die as a result of her connection to the Juto, but she regrets her decision and sacrifices herself to protect both, leading to Tsubasa using his Kibi-Points to revive her at the cost of becoming a fugitive again, as well as his relationship with Natsumi. As a result, Sononi becomes Tsubasa's current love interest after developing feelings for him, and a fellow fugitive by the end of the series.

Sononi can transform into a white-colored battle form. While transformed, she wields the bladed Condor Arrow (コンドルアロー, Kondoru Arō) bow, which can be separated into a pair of swords.

Sononi is portrayed by Amisa Miyazaki (宮崎 あみさ, Miyazaki Amisa).

==== Sonoza ====
Sonoza (ソノザ) is an emotionless man interested in human emotions. He grows fond of Haruka's manga and encourages her to continue her work.

Sonoza can transform into a brown-colored battle form. While transformed, he wields the Kage Spear (カゲスピア, Kage Supia).

Sonoza is portrayed by Shinnosuke Takahashi (タカハシ シンノスケ, Takahashi Shin'nosuke).

== Recurring characters ==
=== Kaito Goshikida ===
Kaito Goshikida (五色田 介人, Goshikida Kaito), whom Jin addresses as the "administrator", acts as the owner of the Donbura (どんぶら) coffee shop. He is a parallel universe version of the leader of the Zenkaigers from Zenkaitopia and transforms into the "Secret Power Black" (秘密のパワーブラック, Himitsu no Pawā Burakku), Zenkaizer Black (ゼンカイザーブラック, Zenkaizā Burakku), who uses a colorless version of the original Zenkaizer's suit with similar powers and equipment. Kaito assists the Donbrothers from the sidelines, summoning Juran Tyranno to combine with the Enya Rideon and form Don ZenkaiOh, retrieving the Avataro Gears from the defeated Hitotsuki, which are later used by the Donbrothers in battle and monitoring the "Kibi-Points" (キビ・ポイント, Kibi Pointo) obtained by each of Taro's companions that they can exchange for having their wishes granted. Kaito also helped revive Taro when he is almost killed by Sonoi, infusing Taro's body with energy from both his fellow Donbrothers and the Nouto which makes him stronger and able to transform into Goldon Momotaro. Other than that, he restores Taro's memories and provides the Victory Super Gear to him, as well as the Don Ohger Crowns to both him and Kuwagata Ohger.

This version of Kaito Goshikida is portrayed by Kiita Komagine (駒木根 葵汰, Komagine Kiita), who also portrayed the original Kaito Goshikida in Kikai Sentai Zenkaiger.

=== Jin Momoi ===
Jin Momoi (桃井 陣, Momoi Jin), also known as the "guardian", is Taro's adoptive father trapped within the closed space between the human world and the Nouto Layer, having recruited the other Donbrothers to aid his son.

Jin Momoi is portrayed by Soko Wada (和田 聰宏, Wada Sōkō).

=== Naoki Shiina ===
Naoki Shiina (椎名 ナオキ, Shiina Naoki) is an alias of a version of Haruka Kitou from the future of a parallel universe who used her Kibi-Points to travel back in time alongside her boyfriend for a vacation, wearing a bunny costume to conceal her identity and hide from her reality's version of Don Murasame. She played a key role in her alternate past self becoming Oni Sister by accusing the girl of plagiarism.

While able to become Oni Sister like her alternate past self, Future Haruka can also become Goldon Oni Sister (ゴールドンオニシスター, Gōrudon Oni Shisutā).

In her true identity, Future Haruka Kitou is portrayed by Kohaku Shida, who also portrays Haruka Kitou.

=== Nouto Inspectors ===
Sonoshi (ソノシ) is a non-binary Nouto inspector who comes from a long line of administrators in Ideon and a nemesis of Sonoi, Sononi, and Sonoza. They were sent by the council to confirm the Nouto trio's fraternization with humans, escaping the attempt on their life when the trio orchestrate Sonoshi's transformation into a Hitotsuki in an attempt to get rid of them. Sonoshi later returns to exterminate the trio and the Donbrothers with their enforcers; Sonogo (ソノゴ), a vain woman who wields the Kid Rapier (キッドレイピア, Kiddo Reipia) in her purple-colored battle form, and Sonoroku (ソノロク), a brutish man who wields the Sanzenkon (サンゼンコン) mace in his grey-colored battle form. The inspectors are all killed by Sonona and Sonoya for their repeated failures and unrelated acts of mischief, with the duo stealing Sonogo and Sonoroku's powers for their own use.

Sonoshi can transform into a crimson-colored battle form. While transformed, they wield the Red Shadow (レッドシャドー, Reddo Shadō) kunai.

Sonoshi, Sonogo, and Sonoroku are portrayed by Tomoki Hirose (廣瀬 智紀, Hirose Tomoki), Mana Takai (高井 真菜, Takai Mana), and Shin Koyanagi (小柳 心, Koyanagi Shin) respectively.

=== Don Murasame ===
Don Murasame (ドンムラサメ) is a sentient serrated katana called the Ninjark Sword (ニンジャークソード, Ninjāku Sōdo) who is capable of manifesting an artificial humanoid body that takes on the identity of a violet-colored, Donbrother-like warrior. He is an artificial life form originally created as the council's weapon against the Juto that Mother released prematurely to fight the Donbrothers before he could be perfected, effectively making him a fugitive by the council. A year later after joining the Donbrothers in their fight against the council's executioners, he works as a waiter in the Donbura coffee shop.

Additionally, Don Murasame can transform into either a past Super Sentai member's form, but without the need of an Avataro Gear like the Donbrothers, or one of the following forms:

- Don Murasame Alter (ドンムラサメアルター, Don Murasame Arutā): A small-sized mecha form that can switch between shark and humanoid modes.
- Black Onitaijin Murasame (ブラックオニタイジンムラサメ, Burakku Onitaijin Murasame): A dark copy of Don Onitaijin that dual wields the twin Sawshark Swords (ソーシャークソード, Sōshāku Sōdo).

Don Murasame is voiced by Ayumu Murase (村瀬 歩, Murase Ayumu).

=== Mother ===
Mother (マザー, Mazā) is a built-in program in Don Murasame for the sake of helping him grow which disappears as he grows. She releases Don Murasame to do her bidding against the council's wishes and later allows him to live his own life peacefully when he decides to join the Donbrothers.

Mother is voiced by Mamiko Noto (能登 麻美子, Noto Mamiko).

=== Anoni ===
The Anoni (アノーニ, Anōni) are strange creatures from the Nouto Layer who disguise themselves as humans and blend into society, only revealing themselves to assist the Nouto or the Hitotsuki in battle or when they are exposed. They wield Ano Hammers (アノハンマー, Ano Hanmā).

=== Juto ===
Juto (獣人, Jūto; Beast Person) are artificial life forms that Don Clan created as an alternative energy source for Ideon so the Nouto would no longer depend on human brainwaves, but the Juto were sealed away after they end up being a threat to both humans and the Nouto. They have a compulsion for folding animal-themed origami related to their true forms. Juto capture humans and hold them within their forest domain, the Forest of Slumber (眠りの森, Nemuri no Mori), as templates to assume human form, creating a link where the destruction of a Juto would lead to the template's death unless the human is able to escape the forest. As a Juto can also die if they are unable to acquire a new template while their current template dies of natural causes like old age. The Penguin Juto, modeled after the animal representing the Don Clan, is ranked as the strongest and most intelligent Juto. The lower rank Juto are Crane Juto and the Cat Juto.

- Cat Juto: Rank-B Juto that function as foot soldiers due to their feral nature, having assumed the appearances of the bus passengers including Kenji Sayama, that of Shizuka Hanamura (花村 静香, Hanamura Shizuka), and that of Tsubasa Inuzuka.
- Crane Juto: A Rank-A Juto that assumed the appearance of Natsumi and created the identity of Miho Kijino (雉野 みほ, Kijino Miho), Tsuyoshi's wife and a hairdresser of the Little Morgane (リトルモルガーヌ, Ritoru Morugānu) hair salon. She played Tsubasa and Tsuyoshi against each other for most of the series to maintain her cover with only Taro aware of her true nature, supporting him in freeing the captive humans from the Forest of Slumber. But it results in her death when the Cat Juto mauls her for betraying them. Miho Kijino is portrayed by Momoko Arata (新田 桃子, Arata Momoko), who also portrays Natsumi.
- Penguin Juto: A powerful Rank-S Juto who is guardian of the Forest of Slumber, formerly a Don Clansman a century ago who assumed his current state to become a powerful immortal with the ability to create illusions. Having assumed the identity of local police officer Terasaki (寺崎), (Note: Credited in episode 14 as Local police officer.) he raised Jiro with the purpose of using him as a new template as his current one is slowly dying of old age. But Taro sabotages Terasaki's scheme and later dies as a result. Terasaki is portrayed by Ichizou (一三, Ichizō).

=== Hitotsuki ===
The Hitotsuki (ヒトツ鬼) are humans turned into monsters when overcome by their inner desires whose presence is a threat to both the human world and the Nouto Layer. Most of them also are infused with a Sentai Gear. If one of them is defeated by the Donbrothers, their hosts turn back to normal. But if a Nouto defeats the Hitotsuki, their hosts are imprisoned within the closed space between the human world and the Nouto Layer. In both cases, the Sentai Gears in their possession separates from their bodies and are converted into Avataro Gears.

- Benitsuki (ベニツ鬼): A Hitotsuki who was originally an unnamed taxi driver, captured by Sonoi, only to be later freed among the Nouto's victims.
- Shisotsuki (シソツ鬼): A Hitotsuki who was originally Yoshioka (吉岡), Haruka's classmate and a former table tennis club member, whose desire is to become stronger with table tennis. He is captured by Sonoi, only to be later freed among the Nouto's victims. Yoshioka is portrayed by Yūsuke Yatōji (八頭司 悠友, Yatōji Yūsuke).
- Kishiryuki (騎士竜鬼, Kishiryūki): A knight-themed Hitotsuki infused with the Ryusoulger (リュウソウジャー, Ryūsōjā) Gear created by Sonoi. He was originally Makoto Kasuga (春日 誠, Kasuga Makoto), a table tennis medalist, whose desire is to prove that he is the strongest. He is defeated by Don Momotaro. Makoto Kasuga is portrayed by Masanari Kanou (狩野 絹成, Kanō Masanari).
- Resshaki (烈車鬼): A train-themed Hitotsuki infused with the ToQger (トッキュウジャー, Tokkyūjā) Gear. She was originally Sanae Isono (磯野 さなえ, Isono Sanae), a 68-year-old part-time worker of Shirokuma Express whose desire is to look younger. She is defeated by Don Momotaro, Oni Sister, and Inu and Kiji Brother. Sanae Isono is portrayed by Sachiko Matsuura (松浦 佐知子, Matsuura Sachiko) In her 40s, she is portrayed by Sanae Yuki (結城 さなえ, Yūki Sanae) and in her 20s, she is portrayed by Momoka Kuroki (黒木 百花, Kuroki Momoka).
- Kaitouki (快盗鬼, Kaitōki): A phantom thief-themed Hitotsuki infused with the Lupinranger (ルパンレンジャー, Rupanrenjā) Gear. He was originally Kurokuma (クロクマ; Black Bear), a thief who passes as a courier to steal lights of his victims' houses out of his desire to bring darkness to others. He is captured by Sononi, only to be later freed among the Nouto's victims. Kurokuma is portrayed by Shutaro Kadoshita (門下 秀太郎, Kadoshita Shūtarō).
- Chourikiki (超力鬼, Chōrikiki): An Ancient Egypt-themed Hitotsuki infused with the Ohranger (オーレンジャー, Ōrenjā) Gear. He was originally Yukio Mizuno (水野 幸雄, Mizuno Yukio), an onigiri specialty store owner whose desire is to make the best onigiri in Japan. He is defeated by the Donbrothers. Yukio Mizuno is portrayed by Kizuki (きづき).
- Keisatsuki (警察鬼): A police dog-themed Hitotsuki infused with the Patranger (パトレンジャー, Patorenjā) Gear. He was originally Kenji Sayama obsessed with apprehending Tsubasa for the sake of his career. He is defeated by Don Momotaro.
- Doubutsuki (動物鬼, Dōbutsuki): An animal-themed Hitotsuki infused with the Zyuohger (ジュウオウジャー, Jūōjā) Gear. She was originally Fūka Kirita (切田 風香, Kirita Fūka), (Note: Credited by last name only.) a nurse whose desire is to look after her patients. She is defeated by the Donbrothers. Fūka Kirita is portrayed by Hitomi Uneda (畦田 ひとみ, Uneda Hitomi).
- Chikyuki (地球鬼, Chikyūki): A globe-themed Hitotsuki infused with the Fiveman (ファイブマン, Faibuman) Gear. He was originally an unnamed Tsunokado High School principal, who have allergies, obsessed with enforcing discipline toward the students. He is defeated by the Donbrothers. The unnamed principal is portrayed by Daifuku Marui (丸井 大福, Marui Daifuku).
- Mashinki (魔進鬼): A gemstone-themed Hitotsuki infused with the Kiramager (キラメイジャー, Kirameijā) Gear. He was originally Sakaki (榊), an artist obsessed in finding a suitable model for his drawings. After Sakaki kidnaps Miho, an enraged Kiji Brother prevents Don Momotaro from defeating Mashinki so Sonoi can capture him. Sakaki is later freed alongside the Nouto's other victims. Sakaki is portrayed by Junpei Shimada (島田 惇平, Shimada Junpei).
- Tokumeiki (特命鬼): A cheetah-themed Hitotsuki infused with the Go-Busters (ゴーバスターズ, Gōbasutāzu) Gear. He was originally Taichi Izawa (井沢 太一, Izawa Taichi), a hospitalized old man whose desire to play as a child again caused him to astral project his consciousness in the form of his childhood self. He is defeated by Don Robotaro. Taichi Izawa is portrayed by Bunmei Harada (原田 文明, Harada Bunmei), his childhood self portrayed by Ouga Tsukao (塚尾 桜雅, Tsukao Ōga).
- Kaizokuki (海賊鬼): A pirate-themed Hitotsuki infused with the Gokaiger (ゴーカイジャー, Gōkaijā) Gear. He was originally Naruki Ōi (大井 成樹, Ōi Naruki), (Note: Credited as Man.) an aspiring manga artist. He is defeated by the Robotaro Donbrothers. Naruki Ōi is portrayed by Yuji Kubo (久保 雄司, Kubo Yūji).
- Shurikenki (手裏剣鬼): A shuriken-themed Hitotsuki infused with the Ninninger (ニンニンジャー, Ninninjā) Gear. He was originally Minoru Ōno, who became furious over perceiving Taro's criticism of his ninja skills as an insult. He is defeated by the Robotaro Donbrothers.
- Uchuki (宇宙鬼, Uchūki): A World Elephant-themed Hitotsuki infused with the Kyuranger (キュウレンジャー, Kyūrenjā) Gear. He was originally an unnamed idol otaku. He is defeated by the Robotaro Donbrothers. The unnamed idol otaku is portrayed by Wataru Oguri (小栗 わたる, Oguri Wataru).
- Zyudenki (獣電鬼, Jūdenki): An electric battery-themed Hitotsuki infused with the Kyoryuger (キョウリュウジャー, Kyōryūjā) Gear. She was originally Fusako (房子), a woman craving for attention. She is defeated by the Robotaro Donbrothers. Fusako is portrayed by Fukiko Hara (原 扶貴子, Hara Fukiko).
- Kousokuki (高速鬼, Kōsokuki): A sports car-themed Hitotsuki infused with the Turboranger (ターボレンジャー, Tāborenjā) Gear. He was originally an unnamed high school shogi player who tries to fulfill his desire to become stronger with shogi. He is defeated by Don Robotaro. The unnamed high school shogi player is portrayed by Taisei Ishida (石田 泰誠, Ishida Taisei).
- Gekisouki (激走鬼, Gekisōki): A race car-themed Hitotsuki infused with the Carranger (カーレンジャー, Kārenjā) Gear. He was originally Tsuyoshi Kijino, who became furious over his wife being hospitalized after a traffic accident. He is defeated by Don Momotaro and Doragoku.
- Kyoryuki (恐竜鬼, Kyōryūki): A dinosaur/fossil-themed Hitotsuki infused with the Zyuranger (ジュウレンジャー, Jūrenjā) Gear. He was originally an unnamed gamer who was angered at losing. He is defeated by Don Doragoku. The unnamed gamer is portrayed by Ryuya Minato (湊 竜也, Minato Ryūya).
- Chojinki (鳥人鬼, Chōjinki): A bird-themed Hitotsuki infused with the Jetman (ジェットマン, Jettoman) Gear. She was originally Kanako (加奈子), a woman who got heartbroken once discovering that Tsubasa, with whom she is infatuated, is Inu Brother. She is defeated by the Robotaro Donbrothers. Kanako is portrayed by Yuka Kohinata (小日向 ゆか, Kohinata Yuka).
- Engineki (炎神鬼, Enjinki): A dragster-themed Hitotsuki infused with the Go-onger (ゴーオンジャー, Gōonjā) Gear. She was originally Minako Sagiyama (鷺山 美奈子, Sagiyama Minako), a ghost who wants to meet the man she has been in love with for 50 years. Unlike the other Hitotsuki, she transforms into Engineking without being defeated by the Donbrothers. Minako Sagiyama is portrayed by Kokoa Naka (中 心愛, Naka Kokoa).
- Goseiki (五星鬼): A martial arts-themed Hitotsuki infused with the Dairanger (ダイレンジャー, Dairenjā) Gear. He was originally Ashida (芦田), a man whose desire is to fight strong opponents to become stronger. He is defeated by Don Torabolt. Ashida is portrayed by Shigeki Itō (伊藤 茂騎, Itō Shigeki).
- Samuraiki (侍鬼): A samurai-themed Hitotsuki infused with the Shinkenger (シンケンジャー, Shinkenjā) Gear. He was originally Shirai (白井), a previous Saru Brother who was overcome with greed, which led him to lose his powers when he used them for his own personal gain, before wanting to know Shinichi's reason to fight. He is defeated by Don Onitaijin. Shirai is portrayed by Yuta Yamazaki (山崎 裕太, Yamazaki Yūta).
- Denjiki (電磁鬼): A jellyfish/electronics-themed Hitotsuki infused with the Megaranger (メガレンジャー, Megarenjā) Gear. He was originally Kentarō Gōda (豪田 健太郎, Gōda Kentarō), a rich business person who wants to hear an interesting story to ease his boredom. He is defeated by the Robotaro Donbrothers. Kentarō Gōda is portrayed by Tet Wada (テット・ワダ, Tetto Wada).
- Jukenki (獣拳鬼, Jūkenki): A Kung-Fu-themed Hitotsuki infused with the Gekiranger (ゲキレンジャー, Gekirenjā) Gear. He was originally Tamaru (田丸), an exam candidate who wants to study the constitution of his country at a quiet place. He is defeated by Don Robogoku and Don Robobolt. Tamaru is portrayed by Shogo Amo (天羽 尚吾, Amō Shōgo).
- Ninjaki (忍者鬼): A ninja-themed Hitotsuki infused with the Kakuranger (カクレンジャー, Kakurenjā) Gear. He was originally Kōichirō Higashi (東 耕一郎, Higashi Kōichirō), (Note: Credited by first name only.) a runaway man who wants something to live for. He is defeated by the Robotaro Donbrothers. Kōichirō Higashi is portrayed by Yoshinari Oribe (織部 典成, Oribe Yoshi'nari).
- Daiki (大鬼): An Ancient Greece-themed Hitotsuki infused with the Goggle-V (ゴーグルファイブ, Gōguru Faibu) Gear. He was originally Manager Yamada, who wants competent subordinates. He is defeated by Don Momotaro and Doragoku.
- Mahouki (魔法鬼, Mahōki): A magician-themed Hitotsuki infused with the Magiranger (マジレンジャー, Majirenjā) Gear. He was originally Minoru Ōno, who now wants to defeat Taro Momoi. He is defeated by Don Torabolt.
- Kagakuki (科学鬼): A scientist/volcano-themed Hitotsuki infused with the Dynaman (ダイナマン, Dainaman) Gear. She was originally Mizuho Ijūin (伊集院 瑞穂, Ijūin Mizuho), a woman who wants to recover a stolen painting. She is defeated by Don Momotaro and Torabolt. Mizuho Ijūin is portrayed by Nanaha Itose (糸瀬 七葉, Itose Nanaha).
- Bakuryuki (爆竜鬼, Bakuryūki): A dinosaur-themed Hitotsuki infused with the Abaranger (アバレンジャー, Abarenjā) Gear. He was originally Nagai (永井), (Note: Credited as President Nagai.) a company president who wants his employees to work faster. He is defeated by Don Momotaro. Nagai is portrayed by Kouji Wakasugi (若杉 宏二, Wakasugi Kōji).
- Choushinseiki (超新星鬼, Chōshinseiki): A prism/supernova-themed Hitotsuki infused with the Flashman (フラッシュマン, Furasshuman) Gear. He was originally Koyama (小山), a man who wants to eat more spicy food. He is defeated by Don Doragoku. Koyama is portrayed by Takashi Yano (矢野 たかし, Yano Takashi).
- Tensouki (天装鬼, Tensōki): An angel-themed Hitotsuki infused with the Goseiger (ゴセイジャー, Goseijā) Gear. The first Tensouki was originally an unnamed big eater who wants to lose weight, while the second was originally Ryūji Inui (乾 龍二, Inui Ryūji), a struggling musician who wants to get back together with his ex-girlfriend and temporarily assumes Tsubasa's place as Inu Brother. The second Tensouki is defeated by Don Onitaijin and Toradoragonjin. The unnamed big eater and Ryūji Inui are portrayed by Yosuke Nishi (西 洋亮, Nishi Yōsuke) and Kenta Yamagishi (山岸 健太, Yamagishi Kenta) respectively.
- GoGoki (轟轟鬼, Gōgōki): An adventurer-themed Hitotsuki infused with the Boukenger (ボウケンジャー, Bōkenjā) Gear. He was originally Minoru Ōno, who still wants to defeat Taro Momoi. He is defeated by Sonoi. (Note: According to the show's official website at Toei Company, either Sonoi's Taro-like behavior or Ōno's mysterious ninja power returned the host to normal.)
- Taiyoki (太陽鬼, Taiyōki): A sun-themed Hitotsuki infused with the Sun Vulcan (サンバルカン, San Barukan) Gear. He was originally Tsuyoshi Kijino, whose desire is to not let anyone take his wife from him. He is defeated by Goldon Momotaro.
- Tokusouki (特捜鬼, Tokusōki): A police dog/police vehicle-themed Hitotsuki infused with the Dekaranger (デカレンジャー, Dekarenjā) Gear. He was originally an unnamed oden cart owner, who wants his customers to stop complaining about the food he cooked. He is defeated by Goldon Momotaro. The unnamed oden cart owner is portrayed by Hiroo Otaka (大高 洋夫, Ōtaka Hiroo).
- Choujuki (超獣鬼, Chōjūki): An animal-themed Hitotsuki infused with the Liveman (ライブマン, Raibuman) Gear. He was originally an unnamed man, who wants to know what youth is. He is defeated by Goldon Momotaro. The unnamed man is portrayed by Kuu Izima (伊島 空, Ijima Kū).
- Kyuukyuuki (救急鬼, Kyūkyūki): A firefighter-themed Hitotsuki infused with the GoGoFive (ゴーゴーファイブ, Gōgō Faibu) Gear. He was originally Kuga (久我), a man who wants to be rescued. He is defeated by Goldon Momotaro. Kuga is portrayed by Koji Kawanishi (河西 晃司, Kawanishi Kōji).
- Seijuuki (星獣鬼, Seijūki): A lion/skull-themed Hitotsuki infused with the Gingaman (ギンガマン) Gear. Minoru Ōno was initially becoming the host body for Seijuuki, but the Hitotsuki was transplanted from the human into Sonoshi and uses their desire, which is to not forgive their subordinates who set a trap, to manifest before being defeated by Goldon Momotaro and Don Torabolt after Sonoi weakened the monster.
- Denshiki (電子鬼): A computer-themed Hitotsuki infused with the Denjiman (デンジマン) Gear. She was originally Noriko Iida (飯田 典子, Iida Noriko), a food critic who wants to eat foods with new flavors. She is defeated by Goldon Momotaro. Noriko Iida is portrayed by Mika Tobari (戸張 美佳, Tobari Mika).
- Jakki (邪鬼): A playing card-themed Hitotsuki infused with the J.A.K.Q. (ジャッカー, Jakkā) Gear. She was originally Tamaki (たまき), a woman who wants her boyfriend, Shinnosuke, to pay more attention to her. She is defeated by Goldon Momotaro and Don Doragoku. Tamaki is portrayed by Moeka Ukawa (鵜川 もえか, Ukawa Moeka).
- Miraiki (未来鬼): A clockwork-themed Hitotsuki infused with the Timeranger (タイムレンジャー, Taimurenjā) Gear. He was originally Mutō (武藤), (Note: Credited as Instructor Mutō.) a driving instructor who wants someone to be his instructor. He is defeated by Goldon Momotaro and Don Doragoku. Mutō is portrayed by Hiroyuki Matsumoto (松本 博之, Matsumoto Hiroyuki).
- Hikariki (光鬼): A Hindu deity/Buddha-themed Hitotsuki infused with the Maskman (マスクマン, Masukuman) Gear. He was originally Santa Claus, (Note: Credited as Real Santa.) who got fed up when children stopped appreciating his presents, despite his efforts to appease them. He is defeated by Goldon Momotaro and Don Doragoku. Santa Claus is portrayed by Yukijirō Hotaru (螢 雪次朗, Hotaru Yukijirō).
- Himitsuki (秘密鬼): A rainbow-themed Hitotsuki infused with the Gorenger (ゴレンジャー, Gorenjā) Gear. He was originally Tsutomu Kameda (亀田 勉, Kameda Tsutomu), a con artist and sham spiritualist who wants someone to help him to escape from a dangerous family. He is defeated by Goldon Momotaro and Don Torabolt. Tsutomu Kameda is portrayed by Chikato Pride (チカトプライド, Chikato Puraido).
- Choudenshiki (超電子鬼, Chōdenshiki): A cyborg-themed Hitotsuki infused with the Bioman (バイオマン, Baioman) Gear. He was originally Rikio Ono (小野 力雄, Ono Rikio), an office worker who wants to be praised more. He is defeated by the Donbrothers. Rikio Ono is portrayed by Keigo Nakamura (中村 圭吾, Nakamura Keigo).
- Hyakujuuki (百獣鬼, Hyakujūki): An animal-themed Hitotsuki infused with the Gaoranger (ガオレンジャー, Gaorenjā) Gear. He was originally Tsuyoshi Kijino, who was overcome with despair with Miho's disappearance. He is captured by Sonoshi's group before being freed when Sonoi manages to free him and the other humans that Nouto captured.
- Dengekiki (電撃鬼): A military soldier-themed Hitotsuki infused with the Changeman (チェンジマン, Chenjiman) Gear. She was originally Tamaki, the same woman who turned into Jakki, also in despair because she thinks Shinnosuke still neglects her. She is defeated alongside Sekaiki by Sonoi using the Zanglassword.
- Sekaiki (世界鬼): A Japanese flag-themed Hitotsuki infused with the Battle Fever (バトルフィーバー, Batoru Fībā) Gear. He was originally Shinnosuke (真之助, Shin'nosuke), Tamaki's boyfriend who wants her to turn back to normal. He is defeated alongside Dengekiki by Sonoi using the Zanglassword. Shinnosuke is portrayed by Ryota Kakoi (栫 良太, Kakoi Ryōta).
- Ohsamaki (王様鬼, Ōsamaki): A king/insect-themed Hitotsuki infused with the King-Ohger (キングオージャー, Kinguōjā) Gear. He was originally Minoru Ōno, who was forcibly turned into a Hitotsuki by Sonoshi, Sonogo and Sonoroku. He is defeated by Don Momotaro. He later turns into Ohsamaki twice, only to be defeated by Don Doragoku and later Goldon Kuwagata Ohger and Goldon Momotaro Ohger. Ohsamaki whose identity is unrevealed is defeated by the Ohsama Sentai.

==== Other Hitotsuki ====
- Entotsuki (煙突鬼): A chimney-themed Hitotsuki who resembles Resshaki. He is defeated by the Donbrothers. This Hitotsuki appears exclusively in the web-exclusive Avataro Sentai Donbrothers Spin-Off: This Is the Donbrothers' Roll Call! The True Avataro!?.
- Ninpuki (忍風鬼, Ninpūki): A fire/tornado/film-themed Hitotsuki infused with the Hurricaneger (ハリケンジャー, Harikenjā) Gear. He was originally Isshū Kuroiwa (黒岩 一蹴, Kuroiwa Isshū), a film director whose desire is to make a good movie. He is defeated by the Robotaro Donbrothers. Isshū Kuroiwa is portrayed by Nobuo Kyo (姜 暢雄, Kyō Nobuo). This Hitotsuki appears exclusively in the film Avataro Sentai Donbrothers the Movie: New First Love Hero.
- Avataroki (暴太郎鬼, Abatarōki): A Don Momotaro-themed Hitotsuki. He was originally Yama. He is defeated by the Donbrothers, Zenkaizer Black, Sonoi, Sononi, Sonoza, and Don Murasame. Yama is voiced by Hiroya Matsumoto (松本 寛也, Matsumoto Hiroya). This Hitotsuki appears exclusively in the stage play Avataro Sentai Donbrothers: Final Live.
- Kikaiki (機界鬼): A machine/gear-themed Hitotsuki infused with the Zenkaiger (ゼンカイジャー, Zenkaijā) Gear. He was originally Minoru Ōno, who just wants to defeat Taro Momoi. He replaces his arms with the World Kashiwamochi World's arms to become Kashiwamochi Kikaiki (カシワモチ機界鬼). He is defeated alongside Kikai Kashiwamochi World by Don Zenkai Momotaro and Goldon Zenkaizer. This Hitotsuki appears exclusively in the V-Cinema Avataro Sentai Donbrothers vs. Zenkaiger.
- Hyogaki (氷河鬼, Hyōgaki): An ice age-themed Hitotsuki. He is defeated by Saru Brother. This Hitotsuki appears exclusively in the web-exclusive Bakuryū Sentai Abaranger With Donbrothers and is voiced by Shūichirō Ōtani (大谷 秀一郎, Ōtani Shūichirō).

==== Hitotsuking ====
On some occasions, the defeated Hitotsuki evolve into giant forms called Hitotsuking (ヒトツ鬼ング, Hitotsukingu) that rampage in the Nouto Layer, forcing the Donbrothers to defeat them a second time before successfully rescuing their hosts and extracting the Sentai Gears from their bodies.

- Kishiryuking (騎士竜鬼ング, Kishiryūkingu): A KishiryuOh-themed Hitotsuking that originated from Kishiryuki's remains. He is destroyed by Don ZenkaiOh.
- Resshaking (烈車鬼ング, Resshakingu): A ToQ Ressha-themed Hitotsuking that originated from Resshaki's remains. She is destroyed by Don ZenkaiOh.
- Keisatsuking (警察鬼ング, Keisatsukingu): A Pat Kaiser-themed Hitotsuking that originated from Keisatsuki's remains. He is destroyed by Don ZenkaiOh.
- Chikyuking (地球鬼ング, Chikyūkingu): A Max Magma-themed Hitotsuking that originated from Chikyuki's remains. He is destroyed by Don ZenkaiOh.
- Uchuking (宇宙鬼ング, Uchūkingu): A KyurenOh-themed Hitotsuking that originated from Uchuki's remains. He is destroyed by Don Onitaijin.
- Zyudenking (獣電鬼ング, Jūdenkingu): A Kyoryuzin-themed Hitotsuking that originated from Zyudenki's remains. She is destroyed by Don Onitaijin.
- Kousokuking (高速鬼ング, Kōsokukingu): A Turbo Robo-themed Hitotsuking that originated from Kousokuki's remains. He is destroyed by Don Onitaijin.
- Kyoryuking (恐竜鬼ング, Kyōryūkingu): A Guardian Beast Tyrannosaurus-themed Hitotsuking that originated from Kyoryuki's remains. He is destroyed by Don Onitaijin.
- Chojinking (鳥人鬼ング, Chōjinkingu): A Jet Garuda-themed Hitotsuking that originated from Chojinki's remains. She is destroyed by Don Onitaijin.
- Engineking (炎神鬼ング, Enjinkingu): A Go-Roader GT-themed Hitotsuking that originated from Engineki's remains. She is destroyed by Don Onitaijin.
- Goseiking (五星鬼ング, Goseikingu): A RyuseiOh-themed Hitotsuking that originated from Goseiki's remains. He is destroyed by Don Onitaijin.
- Denjiking (電磁鬼ング, Denjikingu): A Galaxy Mega-themed Hitotsuking that originated from Denjiki's remains. He is destroyed by Don Onitaijin.
- Jukenking (獣拳鬼ング, Jūkenkingu): A GekiBatTohja-themed Hitotsuking that originated from Jukenki's remains. He is destroyed by Toradoragonjin.
- Ninjaking (忍者鬼ング, Ninjakingu): A Samuraiman-themed Hitotsuking that originated from Ninjaki's remains. He is destroyed by Toradoragonjin.
- Daiking (大鬼ング, Daikingu): A Goggle Robo-themed Hitotsuking that originated from Daiki's remains. He is destroyed by Toradoragonjin.
- Mahouking (魔法鬼ング, Mahōkingu): A Magi King-themed Hitotsuking that originated from Mahouki's remains. He is destroyed by Don Onitaijin and Toradoragonjin.
- Kagakuking (科学鬼ング, Kagakukingu): A Dyna Robo-themed Hitotsuking that originated from Kagakuki's remains. She is destroyed by Toradora Onitaijin.
- Bakuryuking (爆竜鬼ング, Bakuryūkingu): A Bakuryu Tyrannosaurus-themed Hitotsuking that originated from Bakuryuki's remains. He is destroyed by Toradora Onitaijin.
- Choushinseiking (超新星鬼ング, Chōshinseikingu): A Flash King-themed Hitotsuking that originated from Choushinseiki's remains. He is destroyed by Toradora Onitaijin.
- Tokusouking (特捜鬼ング, Tokusōkingu): A Deka Base Robo-themed Hitotsuking that originated from Tokusouki's remains. He is destroyed by Goldon Onitaijin.
- Choujuking (超獣鬼ング, Chōjūkingu): A Live Robo-themed Hitotsuking that originated from Choujuki's remains. He is destroyed by Goldon Onitaijin.
- Kyuukyuuking (救急鬼ング, Kyūkyūkingu): A two mode Go Liner/Beetle Mars-themed Hitotsuking that originated from Kyuukyuuki's remains. He is destroyed by Toradora Onitaijin Kiwami.
- Seijuuking (星獣鬼ング, Seijūkingu): A Gingaioh-themed Hitotsuking that originated from Seijuuki's remains. He is destroyed by Goldon Onitaijin and Toradoragonjin.
- Jakking (邪鬼ング, Jakkingu): A Spade Ace-themed Hitotsuking that originated from Jakki's remains. She is destroyed by Toradora Onitaijin Kiwami.
- Miraiking (未来鬼ング, Miraikingu): A Time Shadow-themed Hitotsuking that originated from Miraiki's remains. He is destroyed by Toradora Onitaijin Kiwami.
- Himitsuking (秘密鬼ング, Himitsukingu): A Gorenger-themed Hitotsuking that originated from Himitsuki's remains. He is destroyed by Toradora Onitaijin Kiwami.
- Hyakujuuking (百獣鬼ング, Hyakujūkingu): A Gao King-themed Hitotsuking that evolved from Hyakujuuki. He is defeated by Don King-Ohger and returns to Hyakujuuki.
- Dengekiking (電撃鬼ング, Dengekikingu): A Change Dragon-themed Hitotsuking that originated from Dengekiki's remains. She is destroyed by Goldon Onitaijin and Toradoragonjin.
- Sekaiking (世界鬼ング, Sekaikingu): A Battle Japan-themed Hitotsuking that originated from Sekaiki's remains. He is destroyed by Toradora Onitaijin Kiwami.

== Other characters ==
- Natsumi Kuramochi (倉持 夏美, Kuramochi Natsumi): Tsubasa's girlfriend who was a member of their theater troupe before she disappeared during the Crane Juto's attack, the Juto using her as a template for her disguise while Tsubasa is framed for the crime. Natsumi is portrayed by Momoko Arata, who also portrays Miho Kijino.
- Yuriko Kitou (鬼頭 ゆり子, Kitō Yuriko): Haruka's aunt and an assistant inspector, portrayed by Hitomi Miwa (三輪 ひとみ, Miwa Hitomi).
- Manager Yamada (山田部長, Yamada-buchō): (Note: Credited as Manager until episode 24.) Tsuyoshi's boss who briefly became the Hitotsuki Daiki after Tsuyoshi failed in work. Manager Yamada is portrayed by Kohtaro Taki (滝 晃太朗, Taki Kōtarō).
- Ishikawa (石川), Takenaka (竹中), and Kiriyama (桐山): (Note: Credited as Co-Workers.) Taro's co-workers portrayed by Takahito Ueda (植田 敬仁, Ueda Takahito), Akira Takeuchi (竹内 啓, Takeuchi Akira), and Ryosuke Yusa (遊佐 亮介, Yusa Ryōsuke) respectively.
- Kenji Sayama (狭山 健児, Sayama Kenji): (Note: Credited in episode 2 as Detective.) A retiring detective who pursues Tsubasa. He once turned into a Hitotsuki but is rescued by the Donbrothers. He is one of 41 bus passengers who disappeared during a Juto attack, with a Cat Juto assuming his form and targeting Tsubasa. Sayama later dies as a consequence of Tsubasa killing the detective's Juto imposter. Kenji Sayama is portrayed by Ryoji Sugimoto (杉本 凌士, Sugimoto Ryōji).
- Marina Maeda (前田 真利菜, Maeda Marina): A photographer who temporarily assumes Haruka's place as Oni Sister after she leaves the Donbrothers using her Kibi-Points. Marina Maeda is portrayed by Hiyori Katada (片田 陽依, Katada Hiyori).
- Minoru Ōno (大野 稔, Ōno Minoru): (Note: Credited by last name only until episode 31.) A man seeking to master the way of the ninja before crossing paths with Taro, resulting in Ōno bearing animosity towards Taro that fuels his transformation into a Hitotsuki on multiple occasions. Minoru Ōno is portrayed by Takashi Sakakibara (榊原 卓士, Sakakibara Takashi).
- Rumi (ルミちゃん, Rumi-chan): Jiro's childhood friend and love interest who lives in his hometown. She would later be revealed to be one of the illusions Terasaki created to manipulate Jiro. Rumi is portrayed by Akari Asano (朝乃 あかり, Asano Akari), who also portrays Hikari Asada (朝田 ひかり, Asada Hikari). As a child, Rumi is portrayed by Miyuka Hayashida (林田 美優嘉, Hayashida Miyuka).
- Mimasu (三増), Hakkai (八会), and Sago (佐五): (Note: Credited as Jiro's friends.) Jiro's childhood friends who lives in his hometown. They would later be revealed to be among the illusions Terasaki created to manipulate Jiro. Mimasu, Hakkai, and Sago are portrayed by Hikaru Morita (森田 光, Morita Hikaru), Toshiki Haseba (長谷場 俊紀, Haseba Toshiki), and Seiji Shaku (釈 聖司, Shaku Seiji) respectively. As children, Mimasu, Hakkai, and Sago are portrayed by Haruto Toyoda (豊田 温大, Toyoda Haruto), Katsuki Suzuki (鈴木 かつき, Suzuki Katsuki), and Taira Utsunomiya (宇都宮 太良, Utsunomiya Taira) respectively.
- Elders: Two leaders of the council who use Taro's energy to resurrect Sonoi. The elders are voiced by Nobuo Tobita (飛田 展男, Tobita Nobuo) and Shinpachi Tsuji (辻 親八, Tsuji Shinpachi).
- Don Killer (ドン・キラー, Don Kirā): A powerful anti-Donbrother android created by the Don Clan in Taro Momoi's image, intended to be activated should the Donbrothers deviate from their mission. The device needed to activate Don Killer is entrusted to Kaito before Jiro unknowingly awakens Don Killer, who proceeds to attack the Donbrothers until forced into an apparently endless conflict with Don Killer Killer in outer space. Don Killer is portrayed by Kouhei Higuchi, who also portrays Taro Momoi.
- Don Killer Killer (ドン・キラー・キラー, Don Kirā Kirā): A powerful battle android created by the Don Clan as a countermeasure in the likelihood of Don Killer going berserk, resembling Shinichi Saruhara. Don Killer Killer's activation device is entrusted to Terasaki before Jiro awakens the android to battle Don Killer, the two androids ending up in an apparently endless conflict in outer space. Don Killer Killer is portrayed by Yuuki Beppu, who also portrays Shinichi Saruhara.
- Future Shinichi Saruhara: A version of Shinichi Saruhara from the future of a parallel universe who is Future Haruka's boyfriend and transforms into Saru Brother. Future Shinichi Saruhara is portrayed by Yuuki Beppu, who also portrays Shinichi Saruhara.
- Future Don Murasame: A more dangerous version of Don Murasame from the future of a parallel universe, lacking Mother as a conscience to keep him in check. He pursues after Future Haruka to eliminate her as a time anomaly, only to be destroyed by Don Murasame for similar reasons. Future Don Murasame is voiced by Ayumu Murase, who also voices Don Murasame.
- Sonona (ソノナ): A female Nouto executioner who kills Sonogo after stealing her powers. She is killed alongside Sonoya by Don Momotaro. Sonona is portrayed by Yuka Motohashi (本橋 由香, Motohashi Yuka).
- Sonoya (ソノヤ): A male Nouto executioner who kills Sonoroku after stealing his powers. He is killed alongside Sonona by Don Momotaro. Sonoya is portrayed by Kōhei Murakami (村上 幸平, Murakami Kōhei).

== Spin-off characters ==
- Reiko Saegusa (三枝 玲子, Saegusa Reiko): A film producer who appears briefly in the series, prior to the film Avataro Sentai Donbrothers the Movie: New First Love Hero. Reiko Saegusa is portrayed by Wakako Shimazaki (島崎 和歌子, Shimazaki Wakako).
- Mr. A la Carte (Mr.アラカルト, Misutā Arakaruto): A male Nouto who resembles Sonoi and appears exclusively in the web-exclusive special Avataro Sentai Donbrothers vs. Avataro Sentai Donburies. He is killed by the Donbrothers. Mr. A la Carte is portrayed by Yuya Tominaga, who also portrays Sonoi.
- Stacy (ステイシー, Suteishī): A parallel universe version of a human-Kikainoid hybrid from Kikaitopia who appears exclusively in the web-exclusive special Avataro Sentai Donbrothers vs. Avataro Sentai Donburies. This version of Stacy is portrayed by Ryo Sekoguchi (世古口 凌, Sekoguchi Ryō), who also portrayed the original Stacy in Kikai Sentai Zenkaiger.
