= Bandora =

Bandora may refer to:

- Bandora (instrument)
- Bandora, Goa, a town in Goa, India
- The Bandora Gang, characters in the Super Sentai series, Kyōryū Sentai Zyuranger
