= List of No.1 Sentai Gozyuger characters =

Japanese television series characters

No.1 Sentai Gozyuger (ナンバーワン戦隊ゴジュウジャー, Nanbā Wan Sentai Gojūjā) is a Japanese tokusatsu television series, the 49th and final installment in Toei Company's Super Sentai series, and the sixth produced in the Reiwa era, also commemorating the 50th anniversary of the franchise.

== Main characters ==
=== Gozyugers ===
The main heroes of No.1 Sentai Gozyuger. From left to right: Rikuo Byakuya, Sumino Ichikawa (Maya Imamori), Mashiro Kumade, Hoeru Tono, Kinjiro Takehara, and Ryugi Bakugami.

The eponymous Gozyugers are five individuals estranged from their families, friends, or jobs due to several circumstances and traumatic incidents. Although they were chosen and assembled by Tega Sword into a team against Bridan, the Gozyugers would also compete against one another and the Universe Warriors in a No.1 Battle (ナンバーワンバトル, Nanbā Wan Batoru) if given the chance, all in a bid to have their respective wishes granted. They are later joined by the previous champion of the ring competition.

Each primary member carries a Gold Tega Sword (金のテガソード, Kin no Tega Sōdo) sidearm, which they utilize in conjunction with Sentai Rings (センタイリング, Sentai Ringu) to transform. Usually stored in the Tsumega Buckle (ツメガバックル, Tsumega Bakkuru) belt, the Sentai Rings also include numbered legend items based on the Gozyugers' 49 Super Sentai predecessors known as Universe Rings (ユニバースリング, Yunibāsu Ringu), which allow them to assume the form of a past Sentai team's lead member through the Retransformation (再変身, Saihenshin) process.

After acquiring the Ryo Tega Sword (リョウテガソード, Ryō Tega Sōdo), any one of the primary Gozyugers can utilize it to assume an armored Tega Sword Gozyuger (テガソードゴジュウジャー, Tega Sōdo Gojūjā) form where they are equipped with a pair of back-mounted Tega Sword Hand (テガソードハンド, Tega Sōdo Hando) appendages. They can also use the Universe Rings to perform a past lead Sentai member's signature move. If necessary, Tega Sword can assume control of the form.

==== Hoeru Tono ====
Hoeru Tono (遠野 吠, Tōno Hoeru) is an impoverished freeter whose reckless behavior makes him incapable of retaining a permanent job. He takes up residence in Saori's apartment. Lacking a wish of his own, Hoeru joins the Gozyugers through an offer provided by Tega Sword to become number one. He originally had a family of his own, as he and his older brother Hisamitsu were among a few individuals who were kidnapped and stranded on No One World during his childhood. However, by the time Hoeru was able to escape as the sole survivor, his parents have since moved on and even had two adopted sons, forcing him into his current predicament. Hoeru ultimately wins the ring competition, using his wish to restart said competition and resurrect his teammates who were killed by Lex. After Fire Candle is defeated, Hoeru proceeds to win the restarted ring competition as well.

Hoeru gains an enhanced sense of smell as a result of becoming a Gozyuger and can transform into the red-colored Gozyu Wolf (ゴジュウウルフ, Gojū Urufu). While transformed, he gains superhuman speed. He also wields the Wolf Decalibur 50 (ウルフデカリバー50(ゴー), Urufu Dekaribā Gō) short sword.

After taming and acquiring the sentient Orca Booster 5050 (オルカブースター5050(ゴーゴー), Oruka Būsutā Gō Gō) tanegashima, Hoeru gains the ability to transform into the red/gold-colored Wild Gozyu Wolf (ワイルドゴジュウウルフ, Wairudo Gojū Urufu). While transformed, he gains hydrokinesis. He can also use the Orca Booster 5050 to temporarily evolve certain Universe Rings into its Boosted Ver. (ブーステッドver., Būsuteddo Bājon), which allows the user to assume a past lead Sentai member's power-up form.

Hoeru Tono is portrayed by Mio Fuyuno (冬野 心央, Fuyuno Mio). As a child, Hoeru is portrayed by Omi Ichikawa (市川 臣, Ichikawa Omi).

==== Rikuo Byakuya ====
Rikuo Byakuya (百夜 陸王, Byakuya Rikuo) is an individual who can entice others with his charisma. He was originally a popular idol singer until he was fired from his agency after falling victim to a malicious slander. Following the ring competition, Rikuo fully resumes his idol career.

Rikuo gains an enhanced sense of hearing as a result of becoming a Gozyuger and can transform into the blue-colored Gozyu Leon (ゴジュウレオン, Gojū Reon). While transformed, he wields the Leon Buster 50 (レオンバスター50(ゴー), Reon Basutā Gō) Gatling gun.

Rikuo Byakuya is portrayed by Hideharu Suzuki (鈴木 秀脩, Suzuki Hideharu). As a teenager, Rikuo is portrayed by Seiga Kunishima (國島 誠雅, Kunishima Seiga).

==== Ryugi Bakugami ====
Ryugi Bakugami (暴神 竜儀, Bakugami Ryūgi) is a follower of Tega Sword from a strict family of doctors who ran away from home when he learned of the latter's existence and started to worship him, hoping to find a life free from his past while simply wishing for Tega Sword to be happy. After meeting Hoeru, he became the manager of Saori's cafe. Ryugi later faces a crisis of faith following Tega Sword's temporary death, even allowing himself to be defeated by Hoeru in a gambit to assure his wish would be fulfilled. He then leaves the Gozyugers to serve as a doctor at his father's hospital, but rejoins them after reaffirming his faith in Tega Sword and regaining his personal Sentai Ring from Rei Gushima. Following the ring competition, Ryugi makes plans to expand Tega Sword Village into a franchise.

Ryugi gains superhuman strength as a result of becoming a Gozyuger and can transform into the yellow-colored Gozyu Tyranno (ゴジュウティラノ, Gojū Tirano). While transformed, he wields the Tyranno Hammer 50 (ティラノハンマー50(ゴー), Tirano Hanmā Gō).

Ryugi Bakugami is portrayed by Masakazu Kanda (神田 聖司, Kanda Masakazu). As a child, Ryugi is portrayed by Haru Iida (飯田 晴瑠, Iida Haru).

==== Kinjiro Takehara ====
Kinjiro Takehara (猛原 禽次郎, Takehara Kinjirō) is a high school student estranged from his family whose wish is to possess eternal youth. In reality, he is an elderly man named Joji Takehara (猛原 譲二, Takehara Jōji), who is required to consume eggs in order to sustain his young appearance after Tega Sword grants him a physical return to his teenage state. After reaffirming his desire to retain his youth, Kinjiro vows to change his rigid lifestyle and encourage his family to pursue their dreams as they parted ways on good terms. He moves into Saori's apartment and works as a part-timer at her cafe. Following the ring competition, Kinjiro retains his ability to rejuvenate into a young man through Mashiro's godlike powers.

Kinjiro gains enhanced eyesight as a result of becoming a Gozyuger and can transform into the green-colored Gozyu Eagle (ゴジュウイーグル, Gojū Īguru). While transformed, he gains flight capabilities. He also wields the bladed Eagle Shooter 50 (イーグルシューター50(ゴー), Īguru Shūtā Gō) bow.

Kinjiro Takehara is portrayed by Jin Matsumoto (松本 仁, Matsumoto Jin). His original appearance of Joji Takehara is portrayed by Masaki Kobayashi (小林 正樹, Kobayashi Masaki).

==== Sumino Ichikawa ====
Sumino Ichikawa (一河 角乃, Ichikawa Sumino) is a private detective whose wish is to protect people. Eight years prior, she was an aspiring police officer who lost her younger sister Oto to Rei Gushima. After getting expelled from the police academy when her line of duty was jeopardized, Sumino took up the role of a private detective to continue searching for Oto, aligning herself with various individuals (including Tokonatsu Atami) while being incapable of transforming herself. Hoeru then encourages her to reaffirm her wish, allowing her to transform and properly join the Gozyugers. After finally rescuing her sister, Sumino's new wish is to bring Oto back to consciousness. She receives a physical change in her appearance from Tega Sword for an undercover investigation, and though initially upset about being unable to change back she decides to accept her new look. Following the ring competition, Sumino and the reawakened Oto travel the world together to make up for their time apart.

Sumino gains telepathy as a result of becoming a Gozyuger, but can only use it on non-Ring Warriors, and can transform into the black-colored Gozyu Unicorn (ゴジュウユニコーン, Gojū Yunikōn). While transformed, she wields the Unicorn Drill 50 (ユニコーンドリル50(ゴー), Yunikōn Doriru Gō).

Sumino Ichikawa is portrayed by Maya Imamori (今森 茉耶, Imamori Maya) in episodes 1–36 and by Kohaku Shida (志田 こはく, Shida Kohaku) from episode 40 onwards after Imamori was dropped from the series for engaging in underage drinking. Gozyu Unicorn is voiced by Ayaka Maekawa (前川 綾香, Maekawa Ayaka) in episodes 37–39.

==== Mashiro Kumade ====
Mashiro Kumade (熊手 真白, Kumade Mashiro) is the original Gozyu Wolf and the victor of the previous ring competition. Although he fought with Tega Sword in the Universe War and fulfilled his wish to save the world, Mashiro was trapped in a gap in spacetime and turned to stone for 10,000 years until Goode Burn turned him back to normal. Seeing how Bridan were able to achieve a temporary victory with Tega June's marriage, Mashiro's new wish is to become a god who surpasses Tega Sword. He originally viewed the Gozyugers as hindrances to his goals, especially Hoeru by deeming him as an inferior successor, but grows to respect the new Gozyu Wolf after seeing his determination firsthand. After sacrificing himself to destroy Lex, Mashiro is resurrected as a god where he uses his godlike powers to do each of his teammates a favor.

Mashiro gains the ability to bring inanimate objects to life as a result of becoming a Gozyuger, but can only use it once. He can also convert the Universe Rings into the cyan-colored Polar Rings (ポーラーリング, Pōrā Ringu), which allow him to either augment Tega Sword with a past Sentai giant robot's parts or imbue Bearkuma 50 with a past Sentai mecha's powers. Unlike the primary Gozyugers, Mashiro utilizes a miniature cestus version of Goode Burn to transform into the white-colored Gozyu Polar (ゴジュウポーラー, Gojū Pōrā). While transformed, he gains cryokinesis. Due to his increased power, Mashiro is unable to initiate Retransformations like his teammates.

During the events of the stage show No.1 Sentai Gozyuger: Final Live, Mashiro acquires the Goode Knuckle (グーデナックル, Gūde Nakkuru) gauntlet, which allows him to transform into the armored Goode Burn Gozyu Polar (グーデバーンゴジュウポーラー, Gūde Bān Gojū Pōrā). While transformed, he is equipped with a pair of Goode Knuckles.

Mashiro Kumade is portrayed by Kaiki Kimura (木村 魁希, Kimura Kaiki).

=== Tega Sword ===
Tega Sword (テガソード, Tega Sōdo) is a hand-shaped godlike being whose power was turned into many Sentai Rings due to the Universe War (ユニバース大戦, Yunibāsu Taisen). In the present day, he approaches candidates for Ring Warriors (指輪の戦士, Yubiwa no Senshi) by providing them with miniature pata versions of himself as transformation devices to become either Gozyugers or Universe Warriors while pitting them against one another to collect their respective Sentai Rings under the promise of having the victor's wish granted. When Bellum made his presence known to the Gozyugers, Tega Sword tries to use the power of the sealed Ryo Tega Sword to erase Cladis as a whole from existence at the cost of his own, but Hoeru's rejection of the new reality convinces the former to deviate from his intended plan, allowing the two to unlock the weapon and granting Tega Sword his means of direct participation with the Gozyugers.

Tega Sword is voiced by Yuki Kaji (梶 裕貴, Kaji Yūki).

==== Giant God Tega Sword ====
Giant God Tega Sword (巨神テガソード, Kyojin Tega Sōdo) is a series of Tega Sword's humanoid giant robot forms where he combines with his enlarged namesake Sentai Rings and the primary Gozyugers' enlarged personal weapons.

- Tega Sword Red (テガソードレッド, Tega Sōdo Reddo): Gozyu Wolf's personal giant robot composed of Tega Sword and the eponymous Sentai Ring. It is also Tega Sword's default form when conversing with normal humans.
  - Tega Sword Deka Claw (テガソードデカクロウ, Tega Sōdo Deka Kurō): A combination of Tega Sword Red and the Wolf Decalibur 50.
  - Tega Sword Red (ToQ-Oh) (テガソードレッド（トッキュウオー）, Tega Sōdo Reddo (Tokkyūō)): A combination of Tega Sword Red and the Yellow and Pink Ressha that is augmented by the ToQger (トッキュウジャー, Tokkyūjā) Ring.
  - Tega Sword Origin (テガソードオリジン, Tega Sōdo Orijin): An evolution of Tega Sword Red infused with the combined powers of past Sentai giant robots. This formation appears exclusively in the web-exclusive prequel special Super Sentai Universe War: No.1 Sentai Gozyuger Episode 0 and the film No.1 Sentai Gozyuger: Tega Sword of Resurrection.
- Tega Sword Blue (テガソードブルー, Tega Sōdo Burū): Gozyu Leon's personal giant robot composed of Tega Sword, the eponymous Sentai Ring, and the Leon Buster 50.
  - Tega Sword Blue Deka Claw (テガソードブルーデカクロウ, Tega Sōdo Burū Deka Kurō): A combination of Tega Sword Blue and the Wolf Decalibur 50.
- Tega Sword Yellow (テガソードイエロー, Tega Sōdo Ierō): Gozyu Tyranno's personal giant robot composed of Tega Sword, the eponymous Sentai Ring, and the Tyranno Hammer 50.
  - Tega Sword Yellow (Daizyuzin) (テガソードイエロー（大獣神）, Tega Sōdo Ierō (Daijūjin)): A combination of Tega Sword Yellow and Guardian Beast Zyu Mammoth that is augmented by the Zyuranger Ring.
- Tega Sword Green (テガソードグリーン, Tega Sōdo Gurīn): Gozyu Eagle's personal giant robot composed of Tega Sword, the eponymous Sentai Ring, and the Eagle Shooter 50.
- Tega Sword Black (テガソードブラック, Tega Sōdo Burakku): Gozyu Unicorn's personal giant robot composed of Tega Sword, the eponymous Sentai Ring, and the Unicorn Drill 50 that can assume a centaur-themed Charge Mode (突進モード, Tosshin Mōdo).
- Tega Sword Akatsuki (テガソードアカツキ, Tega Sōdo Akatsuki): Wild Gozyu Wolf's personal giant robot composed of Tega Sword, the eponymous Sentai Ring, and the Orca Booster 5050.
- Giant God Ryo Tega Sword (巨神リョウテガソード, Kyojin Ryō Tega Sōdo): Tega Sword Gozyu Wolf's personal giant robot composed of Tega Sword, the eponymous Sentai Ring, and the Ryo Tega Sword.
  - Ryo Tega Sword Five Color (リョウテガソードファイブカラー, Ryō Tega Sōdo Faibu Karā): A combination of Giant God Ryo Tega Sword and the Wolf Decalibur, Leon Buster, Tyranno Hammer, Eagle Shooter, and Unicorn Drill 50.

=== Goode Burn ===
Goode Burn (グーデバーン, Gūde Bān), originally named Tega Nagure (テガナグール, Tega Nagūru), is a fist-shaped follower of Gozyu Polar and the former prince of Bridan who was born from Tega Sword's forced marriage to Tega June. After leaving Bridan, and by extension his mother Tega June, out of frustration over his existence, he was given a new name and purpose in life by Mashiro, swearing loyalty to his human companion ever since. In addition to his mother, Goode Burn also distrusts his father Tega Sword due to the latter's skepticism against Mashiro, but is willing to put aside their differences if Mashiro chooses to align himself with the Gozyugers.

Goode Burn is voiced by Kenn.

==== Giant God Goode Burn ====
Giant God Goode Burn (巨神グーデバーン, Kyojin Gūde Bān) is Goode Burn's humanoid giant robot form where he combines with Gozyu Polar's enlarged personal Sentai Ring.

- Goode Burn Bearkuma 50 (グーデバーンベアックマ50(ゴー), Gūde Bān Beakuma Gō): A combination of Giant God Goode Burn and Bearkuma 50.

=== Tega Sword White Burn ===
Tega Sword White Burn (テガソードホワイトバーン, Tega Sōdo Howaito Bān) is a combination of Tega Sword Red and Giant God Goode Burn.

== Recurring characters ==
=== Saori Iijima ===
Saori Iijima (飯島 佐織, Iijima Saori) is the landlady of the apartment where Hoeru and Kinjiro live, and the owner and former manager of Cafe Half Century (喫茶 半世紀, Kissa Hanseiki). She hires Ryugi as the new manager, who changes the name of her cafe to Tega Sword Village (テガソードの里, Tega Sōdo no Sato). During the events of the film No.1 Sentai Gozyuger: Tega Sword of Resurrection, she temporarily transforms into Time Red (タイムレッド, Taimu Reddo) via the power of Tega Sword Origin.

Saori Iijima is portrayed by Noriko Nakagoshi (中越 典子, Nakagoshi Noriko).

=== Aoi Iijima ===
Aoi Iijima (飯島 碧, Iijima Aoi) is Saori's son who enjoys making silly faces with Hoeru. During the events of the film No.1 Sentai Gozyuger: Tega Sword of Resurrection, he temporarily transforms into Lupin Red via the power of Tega Sword Origin.

Aoi Iijima is portrayed by Kōki Yuda (湯田 幸希, Yuda Kōki).

=== Bearkuma 50 ===
Bearkuma 50 (ベアックマ50(ゴー), Beakuma Gō) is Mashiro's polar bear-themed companion and weapon as Gozyu Polar, known for his sharp tongue and tendency to overcharge his services with ridiculously high prices. He was originally a toy bear that Mashiro eventually brought to life via his one-time use ability, and the event since then had Bearkuma 50 swear fierce loyalty to his companion.

On his own, Bearkuma 50 possesses levitation capabilities for mobility and acts as a handheld raygun when wielded by Gozyu Polar in battle. When enlarged, he becomes a snowmobile-themed mecha that Giant God Goode Burn can ride for additional speed and armoured warfare capabilities.

- 35. Gokaiger: Grants the use of the Gokai Galleon's flight capabilities.

Bearkuma 50 is voiced by Kenn, who also voices Goode Burn.

=== Bridan ===
The No One World Bridan (ノーワンワールド ブライダン, Nō Wan Wārudo Buraidan) is an army of wedding-themed artificial beings created and ruled by Tega June. They are based in a castle in an artificial world, and are able to go back and forth between the two worlds through circles. They invade the human world to collect the Sentai Rings, both to deter Tega Sword regaining his full power and so Tega June can use them to alter reality. Whether fighting Tega Sword or inducing mass destruction, a Bridan member can pilot their respective Dress Guard (ドレスガード, Doresu Gādo) robots.

==== Tega June ====
Tega June (テガジューン, Tega Jūn) is the finger gun-shaped queen of Bridan, the creator of the No One World and all its people, and a generative artificial intelligence created by a genius engineer, who fell into despair after losing her daughter, as an imitation of Tega Sword. Her wish is to marry Tega Sword against his will so that she can recreate the human world, with the first attempt being a failure as she only possessed some of the Sentai Rings at the time. Due to a bug caused by her affection for her creations, Tega June becomes weakened and is absorbed by Kuon. With some persuasion from Tega Sword and Goode Burn, she decides to change her ways.

Tega June is voiced by Yukana (ゆかな).

===== Queen Tega June =====
Queen Tega June (クイーンテガジューン, Kuīn Tega Jūn) is Tega June's humanoid giant robot form where she combines with her enlarged namesake Sentai Ring. She can also combine with enlarged dark copies of the primary Gozyugers' Tega Sword-based Sentai Rings to assume varying Bride (ブライド, Buraido) forms, which are as follows:

- Tega June Bride Blast (テガジューンブライドブラスト, Tega Jūn Buraido Burasuto): A combination of Queen Tega June and the Tega June Leon (テガジューンレオン, Tega Jūn Reon) Ring that allows her to manifest a copy of the Leon Buster 50.
- Tega June Bride Broken (テガジューンブライドブロークン, Tega Jūn Buraido Burōkun): A combination of Queen Tega June and the Tega June Tyranno (テガジューンティラノ, Tega Jūn Tirano) Ring that allows her to manifest a copy of the Tyranno Hammer 50.
- Tega June Bride Blitz (テガジューンブライドブリッツ, Tega Jūn Buraido Burittsu): A combination of Queen Tega June and the Tega June Eagle (テガジューンイーグル, Tega Jūn Īguru) Ring that allows her to manifest a copy of the Eagle Shooter 50.
- Tega June Bride Brave (テガジューンブライドブレイブ, Tega Jūn Buraido Bureibu): A combination of Queen Tega June and the Tega June Unicorn (テガジューンユニコーン, Tega Jūn Yunikōn) Ring that allows her to manifest a copy of the Unicorn Drill 50.

==== Fire Candle ====
Fire Candle (ファイヤキャンドル, Faiya Candoru) is the pyrokinetic assault captain of Bridan who gets into a rivalry with Hoeru after the latter defeats him in their first battle. He later becomes a Universe Warrior after stealing Oto Ichikawa's Shinkenger Ring and Silver Tega Sword, which allow him to transform into Shinken Red (シンケンレッド, Shinken Reddo), until he is defeated by Tega Sword Akatsuki. During the events of the film No.1 Sentai Gozyuger: Tega Sword of Resurrection, he temporarily transforms into Shinken Red via the power of Tega Sword Origin.

In battle, Fire Candle wields a unity candle-like staff and possesses a personal Dress Guard known as King Candelar (キングキャンデラー, Kingu Kyanderā). As Shinken Red, his ability to transform stems from the Shinkenger Ring's inherent compatibility with his pyrokinesis while disregarding Tega Sword's consent in the matter. The ring also allows him to access Princess Shinken Red's Paint to empower himself and subconsciously resurrect ShinkenOh under his control. Utilizing the Orca Booster 5050, Fire Candle can evolve his Shinken Red form into Super Shinken Red (スーパーシンケンレッド, Sūpā Shinken Reddo). However, his incompatibility with the weapon eventually corrupts him into Jadou Shinken Red (邪道シンケンレッド, Jadō Shinken Reddo) where he gains the ability to enlarge himself to a giant size. After absorbing the Cladis powers, he gains the ability to summon the Molis and transform into Kaiser Fire Candle (カイザーファイヤキャンドル, Kaizā Faiya Kyandoru).

- 10. Flashman (フラッシュマン, Furasshuman): Grants the ability to generate a supernova.
- 23. GoGoFive (ゴーゴーファイブ, Gōgō Faibu): Grants the use of the GoGoFive team's Life Bird (ライフバード, Raifu Bādo) cannon.
- 36. Go-Busters: Grants the use of Red Buster's Rapid.

Fire Candle is portrayed by Daisuke Sambongi (三本木 大輔, Sanbongi Daisuke).

==== Bouquet ====
Bouquet (ブーケ, Būke) is the titan arum-themed technical captain of Bridan who upon first arriving on Earth becomes a fan of Rikuo, unaware that he and Gozyu Leon are the same person. She eventually learns of Rikuo's secret identity after Ribbon is destroyed by him. After the fall of Bridan, she works part-time as a waitress at Saori's cafe. During the events of the film No.1 Sentai Gozyuger: Tega Sword of Resurrection, she temporarily transforms into Magi Red via the power of Tega Sword Origin.

In battle, Bouquet can dual wield either a pair of Calende Shot (カレンデショット, Karende Shotto) flintlock pistols or a pair of Calenda Knife (カレンダナイフ, Karenda Naifu) karambits and possesses a personal Dress Guard known as Karendeus (カレンデウス, Karendeusu). She later uses a bow given to her by a dying Ribbon to upgrade her Calende Shots.

Bouquet is portrayed by Marupi (まるぴ).

==== Mr. Shining Knife & Mrs. Sweet Cake ====
Mr. Shining Knife (Mr.シャイニングナイフ, Misutā Shainingu Naifu) & Mrs. Sweet Cake (Mrs.スイートケーク, Misesu Suīto Kēku) are the respective mandarin duck and wedding cake-themed general staff captains of Bridan who are also a couple fused together into one body out of their twisted love for each other. Mr. Shining Knife was originally a member of Cladis.

In battle, Mr. Shining Knife & Mrs. Sweet Cake wield a dinner knife-like sword and possess the ability to enlarge themselves to a giant size when their love for each other reaches its peak. If the couple is destroyed, they can regenerate from whipped cream.

Mr. Shining Knife & Mrs. Sweet Cake are voiced by Tomokazu Sugita (杉田 智和, Sugita Tomokazu) and Reina Ueda (上田 麗奈, Ueda Reina) respectively.

==== Kuon ====
Kuon (クオン) is the CEO of Kuon AI Konzern (クオンAIコンツェルン, Kuon Ē Ai Kontserun), and Tega June's most trusted hunter in tracking down and obtaining Sentai Rings in order to accomplish her goal. His real name is Hisamitsu Tono (遠野 久光, Tōno Hisamitsu), Hoeru's older brother who is admired for his results. As the two brothers were trapped in the No One World however, they got separated and Hisamitsu ended up working with Bridan, forcibly discarding his original identity to become a ruthless perfectionist. He later absorbs Tega June and takes over Bridan. After being defeated by his brother, Kuon sacrifices himself to protect Hoeru from one of King Candelar's stray fireballs. However, Tega Sword keeps him alive in the form of the Garyu Decalibur 50 (ガリューデカリバー50(ゴー), Garyū Dekaribā Gō), a variant of the (Dark) Wolf Decalibur 50, until the latter does enough good deeds. Kuon briefly regains his human form during the Gozyugers' final battle against Fire Candle.

Similarly to the Ring Warriors, Kuon utilizes a miniature firearm version of Tega June to transform into the silver-colored Ring Hunter Garyudo (リングハンター・ガリュード, Ringu Hantā Garyūdo). While transformed, he wields a dark copy of the Wolf Decalibur 50 called the Dark Wolf Decalibur 50 (ダークウルフデカリバー50(ゴー), Dāku Urufu Dekaribā Gō). He can also use the Universe Rings to create a copy of a past Sentai team's lead member to either fight for him or be converted into one of their weapons for his use in battle. Following his absorption of Tega June, Kuon gains the ability to transform into the evolved Tega June Garyudo (テガジューンガリュード, Tega Jūn Garyūdo).

- 02. J.A.K.Q. (ジャッカー, Jakkā): Grants the ability to fire playing card-like projectiles.
- 04. Denjiman (デンジマン): Grants the use of the Denjimen's Denji Punch (デンジパンチ, Denji Panchi) gauntlets.
- 09. Changeman (チェンジマン, Chenjiman): Grants the use of the Changemen's Change Sword (チェンジソード, Chenji Sōdo) sidearm.
- 11. Maskman (マスクマン, Masukuman): Grants the use of the Maskmen's Laser Magnum (レーザーマグナム, Rēzā Magunamu) sidearm.
- 26. Hurricaneger (ハリケンジャー, Harikenjā): Grants the use of the Hurricanegers' Hayatemaru (ハヤテ丸) sidearm.
- 34. Goseiger (ゴセイジャー, Goseijā): Grants the use of Gosei Red's Skick Sword (スカイックソード, Sukaikku Sōdo) and/or the ability to perform the Skick Goseigers' Tensou Techniques (天装術, Tensō Jutsu).
- 39. Ninninger (ニンニンジャー, Ninninjā): Grants the use of the Ninningers' Ninja Ichibantou (忍者一番刀, Ninja Ichibantō) ninjatō.

Kuon is portrayed by Karuma (カルマ). As a teenager, Kuon is portrayed by Kiyora Fujiwara (藤原 聖, Fujiwara Kiyora).

==== Ribbon ====
Ribbon (リボン, Ribon) is a dinosaur-themed general of Bridan who is like a younger sister to Bouquet. She is caught in the explosion of her Dress Guard when it is destroyed by Tega Sword Blue and ultimately dies in Bouquet's arms.

In battle, Ribbon wields the Love Scissors (ラブシザーズ, Rabu Shizāzu), which can separate into a pair of short swords, and possesses a personal Dress Guard known as Ribbon Aiaizer (リボンアイアイザー, Ribon Aiaizā).

Ribbon is voiced by Mariya Ise (伊瀬 茉莉也, Ise Mariya).

==== Ai ====
The Ai (アーイー, Āī) are Bridan's church bell-themed foot soldiers who wield the Chamban (シャンバーン, Shanbān) clubs that also double as rifles. Ai with golden heads possess mass-produced Dress Guards known as the Aiaizers (アイアイザー, Aiaizā).

- Cassios Beia (カシオス・ベアー, Kashiosu Beā): The spearhead of the Fire Candle squad who possesses Aiaizer Crossandra (アイアイザー・クロサンドラ, Aiaizā Kurosandora). He is killed in the explosion of his Dress Guard when it is destroyed by Tega Sword Yellow. Voiced by Jun Inoue (井之上 潤, Inoue Jun).
- Star Five (スター・ファイブ, Sutā Faibu): The older brother of Mitsuta Five who possesses Aiaizer Oxypetalum (アイアイザー・オキシペタラム, Aiaizā Okishipetaramu). He is killed in the explosion of his Dress Guard when it is destroyed by Tega Sword Red. Voiced by Wataru Komada (駒田 航, Komada Wataru).
- Mitsuta Five (ミツタ・ファイブ, Mitsuta Faibu): The younger brother of Star Five who possesses Aiaizer Banksia (アイアイザー・バンクシア, Aiaizā Bankushia). He is killed in the explosion of his Dress Guard when it is destroyed by Tega Sword Red. Voiced by Kaori Takaoka (高岡 香, Takaoka Kaori).
- Maji Gire (マジ・ギレー, Maji Girē): A germaphobic Ai who possesses Aiaizer Mandrake (アイアイザー・マンドレイク, Aiaizā Mandoreiku). He is killed in the explosion of his Dress Guard when it is destroyed by Tega Sword Green. Voiced by Masanori Takeda (竹田 雅則, Takeda Masanori).
- Denjisu Park (デンジス・パーク, Denjisu Pāku): A member of the Fire Candle squad. He is destroyed by Gozyu Wolf and Don Momotaro. Voiced by Kento Hama (濱 健人, Hama Kento).
- Mike Goseick (マイク・ゴセイック, Maiku Goseikku): A commentator Ai who possesses Aiaizer Dierama (アイアイザー・ディエラマ, Aiaizā Dierama). He is killed in the explosion of his Dress Guard when it is destroyed by Tega Sword Red and Daizyuzin. Voiced by Junji Shiono (塩野 潤二, Shiono Junji).
- Cho Shinsei (チョウ・シンセー, Chō Shinsē): A helper Ai who possesses Aiaizer Red Flash (アイアイザー・レッドフラッシュ, Aiaizā Reddo Furasshu). She is killed in the explosion of her Dress Guard when it is destroyed by Tega Sword Green. Voiced by Mako Mutō (武藤 真子, Mutō Mako).
- Gorg Lugo (ゴーグ・ルゴー, Gōgu Rugō): A referee Ai who possesses Aiaizer Ribbon Bush (アイアイザー・リボンブッシュ, Aiaizā Ribon Busshu). He is killed in the explosion of his Dress Guard when it is destroyed by Giant God Goode Burn. Voiced by Kenji Akabane (赤羽根 健治, Akabane Kenji).
- Patt Kaisar (パット・カイザル, Patto Kaizaru): A member of the Fire Candle squad. While under the effects of Mystery No One's locked-room mystery, he is murdered by Bearkuma 50 until Sumino solves the crime.
- Surf Mega (サーフ・メガ, Sāfu Mega): Gyaru No One's boyfriend who possesses Aiaizer Hibiscus (アイアイザー・ハイビスカス, Aiaizā Haibisukasu). He is killed in the explosion of his Dress Guard when it is destroyed by Tega Sword White Burn. Voiced by Shō Karino (狩野 翔, Karino Shō).
- Chan Baraba (チャン・バラバ): A history teacher Ai who possesses Aiaizer Shibazakura (アイアイザー・シバザクラ, Aiaizā Shibazakura). He is killed in the explosion of his Dress Guard when it is destroyed by Tega Sword Akatsuki. Voiced by Tadashi Mizuno (水野 直, Mizuno Tadashi), who also portrays his human form.
- Hattesa Buro (ハッテサ・ブロウ, Hattesa Burō): A member of the Fire Candle squad. He is destroyed by Wild Gozyu Wolf. Voiced by Tomokazu Seki (関 智一, Seki Tomokazu).
- Buster Mocchi (バスター・モッチー, Basutā Motchī): Mochitsuki No One's partner who possesses Aiaizer Usagigiku (アイアイザー・ウサギギク, Aiaizā Usagigiku). He is killed in the explosion of his Dress Guard when it is destroyed by Tega Sword Green. Voiced by Senchan (せんちゃん).
- Anima Heart (アニマ・ハート, Anima Hāto): A nurse Ai who possesses Aiaizer Asagao (アイアイザー・アサガオ, Aiaizā Asagao). He is killed in the explosion of his Dress Guard when it is destroyed by Tega Sword Yellow (Daizyuzin). Voiced by Wataru Komada.
- Kou Shinsei (コウ・シンセー, Kō Shinsē): Trump No One's close friend and Cho Shinsei's younger brother who possesses Aiaizer Acacia (アイアイザー・アカシア, Aiaizā Akashia). He is killed in the explosion of his Dress Guard when he activates its self-destruct mechanism. Voiced by Rintarō Nishi (西 凜太朗, Nishi Rintarō).
- Sokkin Gdom (ソッキン・グダム, Sokkin Gudamu): Monodukuri No One's caretaker who possesses Aiaizer King Protea (アイアイザー・キングプロテア, Aiaizā Kingu Purotea). He is killed in the explosion of his Dress Guard when it is destroyed by Goode Burn Bearkuma 50. Voiced by Nobuyuki Hiyama (檜山 修之, Hiyama Nobuyuki).
- Retsu Gouon (レツ・ゴーオン, Retsu Gōon): A member of the Fire Candle squad who possesses Aiaizer Speed Lyon (アイアイサー・スピードリオン, Aiaizā Supīdo Rion). He is killed in the explosion of his Dress Guard when it is destroyed by Tega Sword Akatsuki. Voiced by Sōichirō Hoshi (保志 総一朗, Hoshi Sōichirō).

==== No One Monsters ====
The No One Monsters (ノーワン怪人, Nō Wan Kaijin) are Bridan's animal-themed monsters living in the No One World. To materialize in the human world, a No One Monster assimilates a human with wishes that are number one in their respective fields. At least according to Hoeru, the No One Monsters were responsible for the massacre of his fellow kidnapped victims, thus necessitating his lack of wishes as a survival tactic against them.

- Treasure Hunt No One (トレジャーハントノーワン, Torejā Hanto Nō Wan): A hawk-themed monster created by absorbing Saori Iijima. He is destroyed by Gozyu Wolf. A revived Treasure Hunt No One is destroyed by Gozyu Polar. Voiced by Kenichirou Matsuda (松田 健一郎, Matsuda Ken'ichirō).
- Ninkimono No One (人気者ノーワン, Ninkimono Nō Wan): A mermaid-themed monster created by absorbing an unnamed fruit and vegetable store owner. He is destroyed by Gozyu Wolf. Voiced by Miou Tanaka (田中 美央, Tanaka Miō).
- Party People No One (パーリーピーポーノーワン, Pārī Pīpō Nō Wan): A swallowtail butterfly-themed monster created by absorbing a high school student named Kageyama (陰山). He is destroyed by Gozyu Eagle. A revived Party People No One is destroyed by the primary Gozyugers. Voiced by Makoto Furukawa (古川 慎, Furukawa Makoto).
- Osekkai No One (おせっかいノーワン, Osekkai Nō Wan): A nautilus-themed monster created by absorbing an unnamed man. He is destroyed by Gozyu Unicorn. Voiced by Kenta Miyake (三宅 健太, Miyake Kenta).
- Tokimeki No One (ときめきノーワン, Tokimeki Nō Wan): A crested ibis-themed monster created by absorbing an unnamed woman. He is destroyed by Gozyu Leon. Voiced by Hikaru Midorikawa (緑川 光, Midorikawa Hikaru).
- Showa No One (昭和ノーワン, Shōwa Nō Wan): A Senegal bushbaby-themed monster created by absorbing an unnamed man. He is destroyed by Gozyu Eagle. Voiced by Bin Shimada (島田 敏, Shimada Bin).
- Onigokko No One (鬼ごっこノーワン, Onigokko Nō Wan): A sea otter-themed monster created by absorbing Oni No One. He is destroyed by Gozyu Wolf. Voiced by Shintarō Ōhata (大畑 伸太郎, Ōhata Shintarō).
- Oni No One (鬼ノーワン, Oni Nō Wan): A sea urchin-themed monster created by absorbing a dying veterinarian named Luna (瑠菜, Runa), who was also Gaia Todoroki's fiancée. He is destroyed by Tega Sword Blue Deka Claw and Gao King.
- Manner No One (マナーノーワン, Manā Nō Wan): A manatee-themed monster created by absorbing an unnamed man. He is destroyed by Gozyu Tyranno. Voiced by Shūichirō Ōtani (大谷 秀一郎, Ōtani Shūichirō).
- Undoukai No One (運動会ノーワン, Undōkai Nō Wan): A clouded leopard-themed monster created by absorbing an elementary school student named Taiyō (太陽). He is destroyed by Gozyu Polar. Voiced by Shinya Hamazoe (浜添 伸也, Hamazoe Shin'ya).
- Mystery No One (ミステリノーワン, Misuteri Nō Wan): An earthworm-themed monster created by absorbing an unnamed man. He is destroyed by Gozyu Unicorn. Voiced by Kenji Hamada (浜田 賢二, Hamada Kenji).
- Gyaru No One (ギャルノーワン, Gyaru Nō Wan): A kangaroo-themed monster created by absorbing an unnamed woman who was previously the host of Tokimeki No One. She is destroyed by Gozyu Unicorn and Princess Shinken Red. Voiced by Sayaka Kitahara (北原 沙弥香, Kitahara Sayaka).
- Omatsuri No One (お祭りノーワン, Omatsuri Nō Wan): A red-crowned crane-themed monster created by absorbing an unnamed man. He is destroyed by Gozyu Eagle. Voiced by Naomi Kusumi (楠見 尚己, Kusumi Naomi).
- Setsuyaku No One (節約ノーワン, Setsuyaku Nō Wan): A yak-themed monster created by absorbing an unnamed woman. He is destroyed by Gozyu Wolf. Voiced by Takashi Nagasako (長嶝 高士, Nagasako Takashi).
- Seishun No One (青春ノーワン, Seishun Nō Wan): A Scotoplanes-themed monster created by absorbing an unnamed high school vice-principal. He is destroyed by Gozyu Eagle. Voiced by Taisuke Nakano (中野 泰佑, Nakano Taisuke).
- Dokonjo No One (ド根性ノーワン, Dokonjō Nō Wan): A pond loach-themed monster created by absorbing a high school student named Mitsuki Bando (晩堂 美月, Bandō Mitsuki), who is also Shinya Bando's daughter. He is destroyed by Wild Gozyu Wolf. Voiced by Yasuhiro Mamiya (間宮 康弘, Mamiya Yasuhiro).
- Money No One (マネーノーワン, Manē Nō Wan): A fiddler crab-themed monster created by absorbing an unnamed man. He is destroyed by Gozyu Polar. Voiced by Mitsuo Iwata (岩田 光央, Iwata Mitsuo).
- Omotenashi No One (おもてなしノーワン, Omotenashi Nō Wan): A river snail-themed monster created by absorbing an unnamed woman. He is destroyed by Gozyu Tyranno. Voiced by Yoshihisa Kawahara (川原 慶久, Kawahara Yoshihisa).
- Mochitsuki No One (餅つきノーワン, Mochitsuki Nō Wan): A rabbit-themed monster created by absorbing an unnamed mochi shop owner. He is destroyed by Gozyu Wolf. Voiced by Majime Ono (小野 まじめ, Ono Majime).
- Doctor No One (ドクターノーワン, Dokutā Nō Wan): A poison moth-themed monster created by absorbing a hospital director named Ryuto Bakugami (暴神 竜登, Bakugami Ryūto), who is also Ryugi's father. He is destroyed by Gozyu Tyranno. Voiced by Kōji Takeda (武田 幸史, Takeda Kōji).
- Trump No One (トランプノーワン, Toranpu Nō Wan): A tiger-themed monster created by absorbing an unnamed woman. After his defeat by Tega Sword Gozyu Eagle and Ryu Ranger, Trump No One makes one last effort to destroy the Gozyugers by fusing himself with King Candelar to form Trump King Candelar (トランプキングキャンデラー, Toranpu Kingu Kyanderā), only to be destroyed by Ryo Tega Sword Five Color. Voiced by Hideyuki Hori (堀 秀行, Hori Hideyuki).
- Fashion No One (ファッションノーワン, Fasshon Nō Wan): An angelfish-themed monster created by absorbing an unnamed man. He is destroyed by Gozyu Polar. Voiced by Nobuo Tobita (飛田 展男, Tobita Nobuo).
- Obakeyashiki No One (お化け屋敷ノーワン, Obakeyashiki Nō Wan): A coconut crab-themed monster created by absorbing an unnamed woman. He is destroyed by Gozyu Unicorn. Voiced by Katsuyuki Konishi (小西 克幸, Konishi Katsuyuki).
- Monodukuri No One (もの作りノーワン, Monozukuri Nō Wan): A horned owl-themed monster created by absorbing the creator of Tega June. After surviving destruction by Tega Sword Gozyu Tyranno, she is chosen to become Tega June's pilot. Voiced by Kaori Takaoka (高岡 香, Kaori Takaoka).

===== Other No One Monsters =====
- Universe No One (ユニバースノーワン, Yunibāsu Nō Wan): A trilobite-themed monster banished from Bridan for being created by eating a large number of Ai. He summons Yaiba of Darkness, Damaras, and Azald as part of his forces, who are destroyed by Bouken Red, Gokai Red Gold Mode, and Zyuoh Whale respectively. He absorbs Galaxy Circuit Gurumar to enlarge himself to a giant size, only to be destroyed by Giant God Ryo Tega Sword and Boonboomger Robo Champion. This No One Monster appears exclusively in the V-Cinema No.1 Sentai Gozyuger vs. Boonboomger. Voiced by Tetsu Inada (稲田 徹, Inada Tetsu).
- Yokyo No One (余興ノーワン, Yokyō Nō Wan): The first No One Monster created using Bridan's new technology that allows for the materialization of No One Monsters without assimilating humans. This No One Monster appears exclusively in the stage show No.1 Sentai Gozyuger: Final Live.

==== Other forces ====
- Black Daizyuzin (ブラック大獣神, Burakku Daijūjin): A black/gold-colored brainwashed form of the original Daizyuzin, which Tega June acquired through Meguru Osai's capture and brainwashing. It is destroyed by the Gozyugers after Hoeru uses the Ninninger Ring to summon five clones of Giant God Tega Sword for him and his teammates to pilot at once. Kuon would later use the Dark Wolf Decalibur 50 to resurrect Black Daizyuzin and form Universe Daizyuzin (ユニバース大獣神, Yunibāsu Daijūjin) by replacing Guardian Beasts Zyu Mammoth, Triceratops, and Saber Tiger with Gao Shark and Tiger, Engine Speedor, and the Ryu and Kuma Origami, only for it to be destroyed by Tega Sword White Burn.
- Juzo Fuwa (腑破 十臓, Fuwa Jūzō): A member of the Gedoushu who Tega June duplicated as part of Bridan's forces via the memory stored within the Shinkenger Ring to assist the power-hungry Fire Candle during his tenure as Jadou Shinken Red. He is destroyed by Wild Gozyu Wolf.
- Guardins (ガーディン, Gādin): Bridan's guard dog-themed monsters. One of them was responsible for Hisamitsu's separation from Hoeru and his eventual turn into Kuon under Bridan's servitude.

=== Universe Warriors ===
The Universe Warriors (ユニバース戦士, Yunibāsu Senshi) are a subgroup of Ring Warriors who utilize Universe Rings in conjunction with the Silver Tega Sword (銀のテガソード, Gin no Tega Sōdo) sidearm to transform into the lead member of a past Sentai team. While transformed, they gain an ability unique to their personal Sentai Ring. Similarly to the Gozyugers, the Universe Warriors can also use other Universe Rings stored in the Tsumega Buckle to channel abilities based on the corresponding Sentai. Prior to the Universe War, some of the Universe Warriors from Mashiro's early tenure in the ring competition had tried to harness the Orca Booster 5050, but ended up being consumed by its power and became monsters themselves.

- Natsume Tsutsumi (堤 なつめ, Tsutsumi Natsume): Hoeru's former co-worker and an aspiring musician who possesses the King-Ohger (キングオージャー, Kinguōjā) Ring, allowing him to transform into Kuwagata Ohger (クワガタオージャー, Kuwagata Ōjā). While transformed, he gains the use of the Solid (硬化(ソリッド), Soriddo) ability to harden his Ohsa Mantle (オーサマント, Ōsa Manto) into a prehensile weapon. After his battle with Hoeru is interrupted by Rikuo, Natsume leaves on a journey to prepare for their rematch. He later decides to fulfill his dreams on his own and entrusts his King-Ohger Ring to Origa Red, asking him to surrender it to Hoeru if the latter is worthy of being a red warrior. Portrayed by Haruhi Iuchi (井内 悠陽, Iuchi Haruhi).
- Tokonatsu Atami (熱海 常夏, Atami Tokonatsu): The prime minister of Japan who possesses the Donbrothers (ドンブラザーズ, Donburazāzu) Ring, allowing him to transform into Don Momotaro (ドンモモタロウ, Don Momotarō). While transformed, he gains the use of the Summon (召喚(サモン), Samon) ability to generate origami-like constructs of Momotarō's companions for combat assistance. His true wish however is to gain a friend due to the fact his elite upbringing deprived him of a meaningful friendship. By the time he feigns his defection to Bridan, Tokonatsu is defeated by Hoeru who gladly accepts his friendship. He later returns after Hoeru uses his wish to restart the ring competition, allowing him to become Don Momotaro once more and assist the Gozyugers in their final battle against Fire Candle. During the events of the film No.1 Sentai Gozyuger: Tega Sword of Resurrection, he along with Sunshine Ikezaki temporarily transforms into Don Momotaro via the power of Tega Sword Origin. Portrayed by Kou Nanase (七瀬 公, Nanase Kō).
  - 15. Jetman (ジェットマン, Jettoman): Grants the use of Red Hawk's Jet Wings (ジェットウィング, Jetto Wingu).
  - 24. Timeranger (タイムレンジャー, Taimurenjā): Grants the use of the Timerangers' compression freezing capabilities.
  - 30. Boukenger (ボウケンジャー, Bōkenjā): Grants the ability to materialize buildings and change its interior structure.
- Sakuraba (桜庭): A prosecutor who possesses the Ryusoulger (リュウソウジャー, Ryūsōjā) Ring, allowing him to transform into Ryusoul Red (リュウソウレッド, Ryūsō Reddo). When confronted by Sumino about her missing sister, he tries to claim her personal Sentai Ring, only to be defeated by Tokonatsu. Portrayed by Hiroto Ohmori (大森 寛人, Ōmori Hiroto).
- Meguru Osai (往歳 巡, Ōsai Meguru): A university professor and Sentai archaeologist who possesses the Zyuranger (ジュウレンジャー, Jūrenjā) Ring, allowing him to transform into Tyranno Ranger (ティラノレンジャー, Tirano Renjā). While transformed, he gains the use of the Regain (復元(リゲイン), Rigein) ability to resurrect and pilot Daizyuzin. He also possessed the Abaranger (アバレンジャー, Abarenjā) and Kyoryuger (キョウリュウジャー, Kyōryūjā) Rings before handing them over to Ryugi and Kinjiro respectively to fulfill his demands from the Gozyugers, but was quickly defeated and kidnapped by Kuon. While under Bridan's captivity and Tega June's brainwashing, Meguru pilots Black Daizyuzin to fight the Gozyugers before they destroy the giant robot and rescue him. In spite of losing his Zyuranger Ring, Meguru forfeits from the ring competition after his wish for the Gozyugers to unite as a proper Sentai team is fulfilled. Portrayed by Kandai Ueda (上田 堪大, Ueda Kandai).
- Rikuo Byakuya Victim Association (百夜陸王被害者の会, Byakuya Rikuo Higaisha no Kai): A duo of heartbroken men with a shared vendetta against Rikuo for losing their significant others to his charm. They try to defeat the former idol together, only to be defeated by him.
  - Kawashima (川島): A member of the Victim Association after his girlfriend dumped him in favor of Rikuo who possesses the Sun Vulcan (サンバルカン, San Barukan) Ring, allowing him to transform into Vul Eagle (バルイーグル, Baru Īguru). Portrayed by Catcher Nakazawa (キャッチャー中澤, Kyatchā Nakazawa).
  - Iwashita (岩下): A member of the Victim Association after his fiancée spent all of their wedding funds on Rikuo's merchandise who possesses the Zyuohger (ジュウオウジャー, Jūōjā) Ring, allowing him to transform into Zyuoh Eagle (ジュウオウイーグル, Jūō Īguru). Portrayed by Ryuma Hashido (橋渡 竜馬, Hashido Ryūma).
- Gaia Todoroki (等々力 凱亜, Todoroki Gaia): A drifter who possesses the Gaoranger (ガオレンジャー, Gaorenjā) Ring, allowing him to transform into Gao Red (ガオレッド, Gao Reddo). While transformed, he gains the use of the One Beast One Performance (一獣一奏, Ichijū Issō) ability to tame animals and/or animal-themed Ring Warriors through various instruments. He wishes to find his lost fiancée Luna and joins forces with the Gozyugers in his mission, but as the team soon discovered his true wish is to die together with her due to survivor's guilt. Through Rikuo's singing of The Echoing Melody (響の調べ, Hibiki no Shirabe), Gao King (ガオキング, Gao Kingu) is momentarily resurrected as Gaia's means to aid Tega Sword Blue Deka Claw in saving Luna's spirit from Oni No One. With the No One Monster's destruction and Luna's passing, Gaia finally finds peace within himself and surrenders his Gaoranger Ring to Rikuo. He later returns after Hoeru uses his wish to restart the ring competition, allowing him to become Gao Red once more and assist the Gozyugers in their final battle against Fire Candle. Portrayed by Yūichi Nakamura (中村 優一, Nakamura Yūichi).
- Shoko Yamori (家守 召子, Yamori Shōko): Ryugi's former housekeeper who possesses the Carranger (カーレンジャー, Kārenjā) Ring, allowing her to transform into Red Racer (レッドレーサー, Reddo Rēsā). While transformed, she gains the use of the Stop (一時停止(ストップ), Sutoppu) ability to momentarily paralyze targets via a whistle. Her wish is to bring Ryugi back to his family. However, when he refused after managing to defeat Manner No One on his own, Shoko's Carranger Ring corrupts her into Boso Red Racer (暴走レッドレーサー, Bōsō Reddo Rēsā) where she wields the Nailed Magic Bat (クギマジックバット, Kugi Majikku Batto). She is defeated and subsequently freed from her corruption by Ryugi, surrendering her Carranger Ring to him in the process after becoming confident in his independency from the Bakugami family. She later returns after Hoeru uses his wish to restart the ring competition, allowing her to become Red Racer once more and assist the Gozyugers in their final battle against Fire Candle. Portrayed by Rima Matsuda (松田 リマ, Matsuda Rima), while as a child she is portrayed by Yui Haraguchi (原口 結衣, Haraguchi Yui).
- Oto Ichikawa (一河 緒乙, Ichikawa Oto): Sumino's younger sister who was kidnapped as a child by Rei Gushima. In the present day, she resurfaces as a gyaru-obsessed teenager who possesses the Shinkenger (シンケンジャー, Shinkenjā) Ring, allowing her to transform into Princess Shinken Red (姫シンケンレッド, Hime Shinken Reddo). While transformed, she gains the use of the Paint (塗装(ペイント), Peinto) ability to inflict varying abnormal status effects on targets via the Shodo Phone (ショドウフォン, Shodō Fon). Due to Rei experimenting on her, Oto's Shinkenger Ring is required to maintain her consciousness, as she falls into a comatose state after said ring and her Silver Tega Sword are stolen by Fire Candle. She is then taken away by Rei again. Following Rei's defeat, Oto is freed from captivity by her sister. However, due to losing her place in the ring competition, the Shinkenger Ring can no longer awaken Oto from her comatose state. Following the ring competition, Oto is awakened from her comatose state by Mashiro's godlike powers. Portrayed by Alice Hiyama (桧山 ありす, Hiyama Arisu), while as a child she is portrayed by Nene (希音).
- Sho Torikai (鳥飼 翔, Torikai Shō): A food truck employee who possesses the Go-Busters (ゴーバスターズ, Gōbasutāzu) Ring, allowing him to transform into Red Buster (レッドバスター, Reddo Basutā). While transformed, he gains the use of the Rapid (超加速(ラピッド), Rapiddo) ability to access his namesake's Buster Power (バスターパワー, Basutā Pawā) ability without being afflicted with its Weak Point (ウイークポイント, Uīku Pointo) side effect. He is defeated by Fire Candle. Portrayed by Hirofumi Suzuki (鈴木 浩文, Suzuki Hirofumi).
- Ikki Harewatari (晴渡 一輝, Harewatari Ikki): The student council president of his high school who possesses the Patranger (パトレンジャー, Patorenjā) Ring, allowing him to transform into Patren 1gou (パトレン1号, Patoren Ichigō). While transformed, he gains the use of the Shield (防御(シールド), Shīrudo) ability to generate riot shield-like energy constructs. Despite his job of enforcing the law in his school, Ikki is amongst the students brainwashed by Seishun No One. His role as Patren 1gou further complicates Shinya's efforts to free the students from captivity. After being freed from Seishun No One's brainwashing and getting over his guilt, Ikki helps Hoeru and Shinya fight Dokonjo No One and rescue Mitsuki, during which the Orca Booster 5050 evolves his Patren 1gou form into Super Patren 1gou (スーパーパトレン1号, Sūpā Patoren Ichigō). With the high school freed from Bridan's influence, Ikki surrenders his Patranger Ring to Hoeru. Portrayed by Raiga Terasaka (寺坂 頼我, Terasaka Raiga).
- Shinya Bando (晩堂 深也, Bandō Shin'ya): A former high school principal turned janitor who possesses the Lupinranger (ルパンレンジャー, Rupanrenjā) Ring, allowing him to transform into Lupin Red (ルパンレッド, Rupan Reddo). While transformed, he gains the use of the Release (解除(リリース), Rirīsu) ability to undo the effects of spells placed on targets. With the entire school under the influence of Seishun No One, Shinya is forced to become Lupin Red to free the students one by one while simultaneously clashing with Ikki. He also possessed the Bioman (バイオマン, Baioman), Megaranger (メガレンジャー, Megarenjā), and Gokaiger (ゴーカイジャー, Gōkaijā) Rings before handing them over to Kinjiro, Sumino, and Mashiro respectively once he recognizes the Gozyugers as his allies. After Hoeru and Ikki assist him in fighting Dokonjo No One, during which the Orca Booster 5050 evolves his Lupin Red form into Super Lupin Red (スーパールパンレッド, Sūpā Rupan Reddo), Shinya uses the former's Gold Tega Sword to personally free Mitsuki from said No One Monster as he is destroyed. With the high school freed from Bridan's influence, Shinya surrenders his Lupinranger Ring to Hoeru. Portrayed by Seiji Takaiwa (高岩 成二, Takaiwa Seiji).
  - 35. Gokaiger: Grants the ability to transform targets into the Gokaigers' Ranger Keys.
- Arata Setsuna (設名 新, Setsuna Arata): The development section manager of Kuon AI Konzern who possesses the Battle Fever (バトルフィーバー, Batoru Fībā) Ring, allowing him to transform into Battle Japan (バトルジャパン, Batoru Japan). While transformed, he gains the use of the Sleep (休止(スリープ), Surīpu) ability to render targets in a state of slumber. Utilizing the Battle Ceiver (バトルシーバー, Batoru Shībā) bracelet, Setsuna can summon the Kyoka Armor (強化アーマー, Kyōka Āmā) he created to upgrade his Battle Japan form into Killer Battle Japan (キラーバトルジャパン, Kirā Batoru Japan) where he uses the AI Brain (AIブレイン, Ē Ai Burein) system to outmaneuver his opponents. His true goal is to surpass Kuon by becoming the new CEO of Kuon AI Konzern, having modified the entire premise secretly without his boss' knowledge and incapacitated the Gozyugers on their invited trip to the company. He kidnaps Bouquet and tries to study her nature as an AI-generated being, only to be defeated by the Gozyugers once she is freed by Fire Candle, losing his Battle Fever Ring to Hoeru in the process. After barely surviving the destruction of his own Aiaizer duplicate by Giant God Goode Burn and Karendeus, Setsuna returns to his office where Kuon disposes of him and his research on Bouquet as retribution for his attempted treachery. Portrayed by Atomu Mizuishi (水石 亜飛夢, Mizuishi Atomu).
- Genji Kaku (嘉挧 源治, Kaku Genji): Kinjiro's childhood friend who possesses the Dairanger (ダイレンジャー, Dairenjā) Ring, allowing him to transform into Ryu Ranger (リュウレンジャー, Ryū Renjā). While transformed, he gains the use of the Change (転身(チェインジ), Cheinji) ability to shapeshift into any object of his choosing. Like Kinjiro, Genji is given a physical return to his teenage state upon entering the ring competition, but is required to consume cod liver oil drops in order to sustain his young appearance, and wishes to possess eternal youth. Upon seeing Kinjiro's determination in fighting Trump No One in spite of his original elderly form as Joji, Genji decides to forfeit from the ring competition, surrendering his Dairanger Ring to Kinjiro. He later returns after Hoeru uses his wish to restart the ring competition, allowing him to become Ryu Ranger once more and assist the Gozyugers in their final battle against Fire Candle. Portrayed by Ryunosuke Shimamura (島村 龍乃介, Shimamura Ryūnosuke), while his original appearance is portrayed by Shigeru Saiki (斉木 しげる, Saiki Shigeru).
- Koyo Iwao (巌 紅葉, Iwao Kōyō): A former detective and a benefactor from Hoeru and Kuon's past who possesses the Dekaranger (デカレンジャー, Dekarenjā) Ring, allowing him to transform into Deka Red (デカレッド, Deka Reddo). While transformed, he gains the use of the Armed (装甲(アームド), Āmudo) ability to upgrade his Deka Red form into the armored Armed Deka Red (アームドデカレッド, Āmudo Deka Redoo) (Note: Armed Deka Red reuses the Premiere Deka Red suit from Tokusou Sentai Dekaranger 20th: Fireball Booster.) where he wields the D-Revolver (ディーリボルバー, Dī Riborubā) machine gun and the D-Sword Vega (ディーソード・ベガ, Dī Sōdo Bega). Koyo's wish is to reform Kuon after discovering his fall to Bridan's servitude, but is ultimately defeated by him. Nevertheless, he entrusts his wish to Hoeru as he is hospitalized. Portrayed by Ryosei Konishi (小西 遼生, Konishi Ryōsei).
- Iwano (岩野): A man who possesses the Ohranger (オーレンジャー, Ōrenjā) Ring, allowing him to transform into Oh Red (オーレッド, Ō Reddo). He was defeated by Ryugi before the series. Portrayed by Takashi Ibano (伊場野 高嗣, Ibano Takashi).

=== Rei Gushima ===
Rei Gushima (具島 玲, Gushima Rei) is Rikuo's childhood friend, known for his distinct grey-colored pair of eyes. Originally a surgeon at the hospital run by the Bakugami family, Rei was caught in an injury incident by protecting Rikuo from an obsessed fan that costed him his career as a surgeon. Suffering from an incurable disease, he kidnaps Oto and puts her in a comatose state in hopes of finding a way to research his disease, with her brief awakening by the Shinkenger Ring further corroborating his claims. Eventually after failing to use his predicament as leverage against Rikuo, Rei decides to make himself an active participant in the battle between the Ring Warriors and Bridan. He is ultimately arrested and sent to prison after Bellum is separated from him. Following the ring competition, Rei is cured of his disease by Mashiro's godlike powers, allowing him to attend one of Rikuo's concerts once he is released from prison.

Rei possesses the Blank (ブランク, Buranku) Ring, a remnant of Cladis that allows him to absorb Sentai Rings and transform into a Ring Warrior of his choosing. Upon absorbing four Universe Rings (Magiranger, Zyuohger, Kyuranger, and Zenkaiger), the Blank Ring evolves into the Cladis Ring, which can absorb the souls of non-Ring Warriors to fuel its namesake's revival. It is destroyed by Tega Sword Gozyu Leon.

- 29. Magiranger (マジレンジャー, Majirenjā): Allows Rei to transform into Magi Red (マジレッド, Maji Reddo). While transformed, he gains the use of the Ash (灰化(アッシュ), Asshu) ability to generate incinerating Ash Flames (アッシュフレイム, Asshu Fureimu).
- 46. Zenkaiger (ゼンカイジャー, Zenkaijā): Allows Rei to transform into Zenkaizer (ゼンカイザー, Zenkaizā). While transformed, he gains the ability to open portals. He can also access Magi Red's Ash to change his Zenkaizer form into Zenkaizer Black (ゼンカイザーブラック, Zenkaizā Burakku) where he dual wields both of his namesakes' Geartlinger (ギアトリンガー, Giatoringā) firearms.
- Gozyu Tyranno: Allows Rei to transform into the eponymous Gozyuger.

Rei Gushima is portrayed by Ryōma Baba (馬場 良馬, Baba Ryōma).

=== Cladis ===
The Abysmal Calamity Cladis (深淵なる厄災クラディス, Shin'en naru Yakusai Kuradisu), also simply known as the Calamity (厄災, Yakusai), are the secondary antagonists of the series. They are beings who seek to destroy the universe and were sealed by Tega Sword during the Universe War.

- Dura Lex Sed Lex (ドゥーラ・レクス・セド・レクス, Dūra Rekusu Sedo Rekusu): The leader of Cladis, also simply known as Lex (レクス, Rekusu), that faced off against an army of past Sentai giant robots in the Universe War at some point prior to the series. Due to his massive strength and army of robots, Tega Sword is forced to use his allies' powers to seal Lex, at the cost of the Sentai Rings' mass dispersion across the universe. In the present day, he is freed from his imprisonment, only to be destroyed by Gozyu Polar. During the events of the stage show No.1 Sentai Gozyuger: Final Live, he is resurrected by using Mendacium as his minion, only to be destroyed by Tega Sword Gozyu Wolf and Goode Burn Gozyu Polar. Voiced by Kenichi Suzumura (鈴村 健一, Suzumura Ken'ichi).
- Bellum (ベルルム, Berurumu): A surviving general of Cladis who uses Rei as a vessel. He is destroyed by Giant God Ryo Tega Sword. Voiced by Daisuke Hirakawa (平川 大輔, Hirakawa Daisuke).
  - Temuno (テムノー, Temunō): A minion of Bellum. It is destroyed by Tega Sword Gozyu Wolf.
- Vidal (ビダル, Bidaru): A surviving general of Cladis. After his defeat by Tega Sword Red and Muteki Shogun, Vidal's lifeless body is devoured by Fire Candle. Voiced by Hiroshi Tsuchida (土田 大, Tsuchida Hiroshi).
- Molis (モリス, Morisu): Cladis' foot soldiers who have the same appearance as the foot soldiers of previous Super Sentai series. They first appear in the film No.1 Sentai Gozyuger: Tega Sword of Resurrection.

== Other characters ==
- Mine Takanashi (高梨 嶺, Takanashi Mine): A victim of kidnapping in the No One World who Hoeru bonds with, taking care of the Tono brothers alongside Koyo before Hisamitsu's untimely capture. She is also the one who convinces Hoeru not to have a wish of his own to protect himself from being assimilated with a No One Monster, with Mine herself falling victim afterwards. In the present day, Kuon resurrects Mine and brutally kills her again in an attempt to demoralize Hoeru from fighting, but her encouragement and his determination allows him to move on. Portrayed by Yuria Kamiya (神谷 侑理愛, Kamiya Yuria).
- Kazu Sekimoto (関本 カズ, Sekimoto Kazu): A producer at Toei Company who spearheaded the production of interviewing the Gozyugers under Mashiro's sponsorship. After discovering that Hoeru is Gozyu Wolf, Sekimoto gives him the unclaimed Gorenger (ゴレンジャー, Gorenjā) Ring from Toei's warehouse to defeat Hattesa Buro, eventually firing him to ensure his continued commitment to his duty as a Gozyuger. He later reunites with Hoeru at Tega Sword Village to interview his former employee about the secrets of the Sentai Rings. After the ring competition is restarted by Hoeru's wish, Sekimoto becomes a Universe Warrior himself, using the Gorenger Ring to transform into Akarenger (アカレンジャー, Akarenjā), to assist the Gozyugers in their final battle against Fire Candle. Portrayed by Tomokazu Seki.
- Seiya Aoto (青十 聖夜, Aoto Seiya): Rikuo's predecessor as Gozyu Leon. Twenty years before the series, he sacrificed himself to protect Mashiro from being attacked by Jaaku Gozyu Tyranno. Portrayed by Kouki Niiyama (新山 航希, Niiyama Kōki).
- Assam (アッサム, Assamu): The prince of Planet Assamica (惑星アッサミカ, Wakusei Assamika) who replaces Ryugi as Gozyu Tyranno until he is absorbed into the Blank Ring by Rei. He temporarily becomes Rei's brainwashed pawn, during which the latter uses his Cladis Ring to channel the Kyuranger (キュウレンジャー, Kyūrenjā) Ring and transform Assam into Shishi Red (シシレッド, Shishi Reddo), before returning to his home planet. Portrayed by Hiroki Sasamori (笹森 裕貴, Sasamori Hiroki).
- Origa Red (オリガレッド, Origa Reddo): A representative of the Original Sentai Origaranger (折リジナル戦隊オリガレンジャー, Orijinaru Sentai Origarenjā) who appears from another universe to become a true red warrior. In battle, he wields the Kami Sword (神ソード, Kami Sōdo), which allows him to fire orizuru-like projectiles. After seeing Hoeru as a worthy red warrior, Origa Red surrenders his King-Ohger Ring to him as per Natsume's request. Voiced by Shimba Tsuchiya (土屋 神葉, Tsuchiya Shinba).
  - 48. King-Ohger: Grants the use of the Super Solid (スーパー硬化(ソリッド), Sūpā Soriddo) ability to imbue Origa Red's attacks with crystallized energy.

=== Returning characters ===
- Sasuke (サスケ): The second-in-command of the 18th Super Sentai team, Ninja Sentai Kakuranger, who possesses the Universe Ring of his team namesake and can transform into Ninja Red (ニンジャレッド, Ninja Reddo) via the Silver Tega Sword as an alternative transformation device. He was given his Kakuranger (カクレンジャー, Kakurenjā) Ring by Origa Red, who asks him to teach the Gozyugers about the true Super Sentai spirit. Through Origa Red's powers, Muteki Shogun (無敵将軍, Muteki Shōgun) is momentarily resurrected as Sasuke's means to aid Tega Sword Red in fighting Vidal. With the Cladis general's defeat, Sasuke surrenders his Kakuranger Ring to Ryugi. Teruaki Ogawa (小川 輝晃, Ogawa Teruaki) reprises his role from Ninja Sentai Kakuranger.
  - 21. Megaranger: Grants the use of Mega Red's Cyber Slider 1 (サイバースライダー１, Saibā Suraidā 1) hoverboard.
  - 25. Gaoranger: Grants the use of Gao Red's Lion Fang (ライオンファング, Raion Fangu) cestus.
  - 37. Kyoryuger: Grants the use of Kyoryu Red's Gabutyra Fang (ガブティラファング, Gabutira Fangu) cestus.
  - 40. Zyuohger: Grants the use of Zyuoh Eagle's extendable Eagriser (イーグライザー, Īguraizā) sword.
  - 44. Ryusoulger: Grants the use of the Ryusoulgers' Ryusoul Ken (リュウソウケン, Ryūsō Ken; Ryusoul Sword) sidearm.
  - 45. Kiramager (キラメイジャー, Kirameijā): Grants the use of the Kiramagers' Kiramai Buster (キラメイバスター, Kiramei Basutā) rifle.

== Spin-off characters ==
- Pestis (ペスティス, Pesutisu): A surviving general of Cladis who appears exclusively in the film No.1 Sentai Gozyuger: Tega Sword of Resurrection. He is destroyed by Tega Sword Origin. Voiced by Show Hayami (速水 奨, Hayami Shō).
- Junta (純太): A customer at Tega Sword Village who appears exclusively in the film No.1 Sentai Gozyuger: Tega Sword of Resurrection. He temporarily transforms into Gosei Red (ゴセイレッド, Gosei Reddo) via the power of Tega Sword Origin. Portrayed by Junsei Motojima (本島 純政, Motojima Junsei).
- Elderly Lady Trio (おばあちゃん3人組, Obāchan Sannin-gumi): A group of older women who appear exclusively in the film No.1 Sentai Gozyuger: Tega Sword of Resurrection. They temporarily transform into Ninja Red, Hurricane Red (ハリケンレッド, Hariken Reddo), and Aka Ninger (アカニンジャー, Aka Ninjā) via the power of Tega Sword Origin. The woman who transforms into Aka Ninger is portrayed by Chiharu Mizuno (水野 千春, Mizuno Chiharu).
- Gorgeous (ゴー☆ジャス, Gōjasu): A comedian who appears exclusively in the film No.1 Sentai Gozyuger: Tega Sword of Resurrection. He temporarily transforms into Gokai Red (ゴーカイレッド, Gōkai Reddo) via the power of Tega Sword Origin. Portrayed by himself.
- Sunshine Ikezaki (サンシャイン池崎, Sanshain Ikezaki): A comedian who appears exclusively in the film No.1 Sentai Gozyuger: Tega Sword of Resurrection. He along with Tokonatsu temporarily transforms into Don Momotaro via the power of Tega Sword Origin. Portrayed by himself.
- Shoko Nakagawa (中川 翔子, Nakagawa Shōko): A media personality who appears exclusively in the film No.1 Sentai Gozyuger: Tega Sword of Resurrection. She temporarily transforms into Denji Red (デンジレッド, Denji Reddo) via the power of Tega Sword Origin. Portrayed by herself.
- Tetsuya (てつや): A YouTuber who appears exclusively in the film No.1 Sentai Gozyuger: Tega Sword of Resurrection. He temporarily transforms into Deka Red via the power of Tega Sword Origin. Portrayed by himself.
- Salaryman (サラリーマン, Sararīman): A businessman who appears exclusively in the film No.1 Sentai Gozyuger: Tega Sword of Resurrection. He temporarily transforms into Vul Eagle via the power of Tega Sword Origin. Portrayed by Ryousuke Kato (加藤 亮佑, Katō Ryōsuke).
- Hoeru Tono of the Light (光の遠野 吠, Hikari no Tōno Hoeru): Hoeru's well-behaved but self-righteous counterpart and an aspect of Hoeru himself separated from him by Galaxy Circuit Gurumar who appears exclusively in the V-Cinema No.1 Sentai Gozyuger vs. Boonboomger. Unlike his original counterpart, he can transform into the red/white-colored Saint Gozyu Wolf (セイントゴジュウウルフ, Seinto Gojū Urufu). While transformed, he gains photokinesis. He ultimately remerges with Hoeru. Portrayed by Mio Fuyuno, who also portrays Hoeru Tono.
- Mendacium (メンダシウム, Mendashiumu): A Cladis-human hybrid, nicknamed "Me-chan" (めーちゃん, Mēchan) by Goode Burn, who appears exclusively in the stage show No.1 Sentai Gozyuger: Final Live. She is threatened by Lex, who will erase her human mother from existence if she refuses to work for him, and is forced to kidnap people and try and steal Goode Burn's powers. After Lex's destruction, she marries Goode Burn. Voiced by Miku Itō (伊藤 美来, Itō Miku).
- Midoriko Itokiri (糸切 緑子, Itokiri Midoriko): An elementary school student and Kinjiro's predecessor as Gozyu Eagle who appears exclusively in the web-exclusive special No.1 Sentai Gozyuger: Polar Beginning. In the present day, she becomes the first Japanese woman to receive the Nobel Peace Prize. Portrayed by Itono Okita (沖田 絃乃, Okita Itono), while as an adult she is portrayed by Kasumi Hasegawa (長谷川 かすみ, Hasegawa Kasumi).
- Misaki Kurobane (黒羽 ミサキ, Kurobane Misaki): A fortune teller, assassin, and Sumino's predecessor as Gozyu Unicorn who appears exclusively in the web-exclusive special No.1 Sentai Gozyuger: Polar Beginning. Twenty years before the series, she sacrificed herself to protect Midoriko from being attacked by Jaaku Gozyu Tyranno. Portrayed by Mei Angela (アンジェラ 芽衣, Anjera Mei).
- Naoto Kitora (黄虎 直斗, Kitora Naoto): A mixed martial arts world champion, Ryugi's predecessor as Gozyu Tyranno, and the human host of a member of Cladis who appears exclusively in the web-exclusive special No.1 Sentai Gozyuger: Polar Beginning. Utilizing the Orca Booster 5050 (Black Ver.) (オルカブースター5050(ゴーゴー) (ブラックver.), Oruka Būsutā Gō Gō (Burakku Bājon)) tanegashima, he can transform into a monstrous version of Gozyu Tyranno known as Jaaku Gozyu Tyranno (邪悪ゴジュウティラノ, Jaaku Gojū Tirano). Twenty years before the series, he was defeated by Gozyu Wolf. Portrayed by Motoki Fukami (深水 元基, Fukami Motoki), while as a youth he is portrayed by Taishi Sato (佐藤 大志, Satō Taishi).
