= List of Kyōryū Sentai Zyuranger characters =

Kyōryū Sentai Zyuranger (恐竜戦隊ジュウレンジャー, Kyōryū Sentai Juurenjā) is a Japanese tokusatsu series that serves as the 16th installment in the Super Sentai franchise and the fourth entry in the Heisei era.

== Main characters ==
=== Zyurangers ===
The Zyurangers (sans Burai) transformed. From left to right: Goushi, Boi, Geki, Mei, and Dan.

The eponymous Zyurangers are five warriors from an ancient civilization of humans that evolved from dinosaurs and coexisted with them. They were kept in suspended animation for 170 million years by their mentor Barza until their nemesis Bandora was accidentally released from her prison on the planetoid Nemesis. A sixth member later joins the team after being revived from suspended animation.

The team utilizes Dino Medal (ディノメダル, Dino Medaru) coins in conjunction with Dino Bucklers (ダイノバックラー, Daino Bakkurā), or Dragon Buckler (ドラゴンバックラー, Doragon Bakkurā) in the case of Dragon Ranger, to transform. While transformed, the primary members each carry a Ranger Stick (レンジャースティック, Renjā Sutikku) sidearm, which can switch between its Ranger Sword (レンジャーソード, Renjā Sōdo) and Ranger Gun (レンジャーガン, Renjā Gan) modes, and wield unique Legendary Weapons (伝説の武器, Densetsu no Buki), which can combine to form the Howling Cannon (ハウリングキャノン, Hauringu Kyanon). They also ride Saurer Machine (ザウラーマシン, Zaurā Mashin) motorcycles for transportation. Later in the series, they acquire Thunder Slingers (サンダースリンガー, Sandā Suringā), which can combine with a Ranger Gun to form the Ranger Slinger (レンジャースリンガー, Renjā Suringā).

During the events of the crossover film Zyuden Sentai Kyoryuger vs. Go-Busters: The Great Dinosaur Battle! Farewell Our Eternal Friends, the Zyurangers combine their Howling Cannon, the Abarangers' Dino Bomber, and the Kyoryugers' Kentrospiker to form Ultimate Howling Cannon (アルティメットハウリングキャノン, Arutimetto Hauringu Kyanon).

==== Geki ====
Geki (ゲキ) is the 24-year-old prince of the Yamato Tribe who is known as the "Warrior of Justice" (正義の戦士, Seigi no Senshi) and fights as the red-colored Tyranno Ranger (ティラノレンジャー, Tirano Renjā). Geki is the leader of the Zyurangers who is the younger brother of Burai and has a strong sense of justice. Though he was raised by the King and Queen of the Yamato Tribe, he was actually adopted by them after his birth father rebelled against the Yamato King and was forced to give Geki up for adoption as punishment for his insubordination. His birth father used this as an opportunity to challenge the King and reclaim Geki, only to be killed by the King. Geki learns the truth after meeting Burai.

During the events of the crossover film Zyuden Sentai Kyoryuger vs. Go-Busters: The Great Dinosaur Battle! Farewell Our Eternal Friends, Geki is kidnapped by Neo-Grifforzar so his Dino Hope can be extracted for Voldos, but is saved by the Kyoryugers. He and his team then join forces with the Abarangers, Go-Busters, and Kyoryugers in order to defeat their common enemy.

As Tyranno Ranger, Geki wields the Ryugeki Sword (龍撃剣, Ryūgeki Ken; Dragon Fierce Sword). He also rides the Road Saurer 1 (ロードザウラー１, Rōdo Zaurā Wan), which is equipped with a machine gun. After Burai's death, Geki inherits his powers, allowing him to transform into Armed Tyranno Ranger (アームドティラノレンジャー, Āmudo Tirano Renjā) where he wears the Dragon Armor and wields the Zyusouken.

Geki is portrayed by Yūta Mochizuki (望月 祐多, Mochizuki Yūta).

==== Goushi ====
Goushi (ゴウシ, Gōshi) is a 27-year-old knight of the Sharma Tribe who is known as the "Warrior of Wisdom" (知恵の戦士, Chie no Senshi) and fights as the black-colored Mammoth Ranger (マンモスレンジャー, Manmosu Renjā). Calm, cool, and collected, Goushi is the team's second-in-command and his wisdom allows him to come up with strategies to save his teammates whenever they're cornered. He lost his parents when he was young and was raised by his older sister, who died while fighting Bandora's forces after Goushi reached adulthood.

Goushi appeared in the final episode of Kaizoku Sentai Gokaiger, receiving his powers back in the form of the Mammoth Ranger key as the Gokaigers left Earth.

As Mammoth Ranger, Goushi wields the Moth Breaker (モスブレイカー, Mosu Bureikā) battle axe, which can be reconfigured into a rifle. He also rides the Side Saurer 2 (サイドザウラー２, Saido Zaurā Tsū), which is equipped with a pair of mini-cannons and has a sidecar for Boi.

Goushi is portrayed by Seiju Umon (右門 青寿, Umon Seiju), credited under his real name Aohisa Takayasu (高安 青寿, Takayasu Aohisa).

==== Dan ====
Dan (ダン) is a 19-year-old knight of the Etoffe Tribe who is known as the "Warrior of Courage" (勇気の戦士, Yūki no Senshi) and fights as the blue-colored Tricera Ranger (トリケラレンジャー, Torikera Renjā). He is a courageous warrior who is willing to stand up for himself against the enemy, although he has a tendency to rush into dangerous situations without thinking things through. He is a cheerful character who serves as the team's comic relief.

As Tricera Ranger, Dan wields the double-headed TriceLance (トリケランス, Torikeransu) trident, which can separate in half to form a pair of spears. He also rides the Side Saurer 3 (サイドザウラー３, Saido Zaurā Surī), which is equipped with a pair of machine guns and has a sidecar for Mei.

Dan is portrayed by Hideki Fujiwara (藤原 秀樹, Fujiwara Hideki).

==== Boi ====
Boi (ボーイ, Bōi) is a 15-year-old knight of the Dime Tribe who is known as the "Warrior of Hope" (希望の戦士, Kibō no Senshi) and fights as the yellow-colored Tiger Ranger (タイガーレンジャー, Taigā Renjā). Boi is the youngest and most curious member of the team. He is also the most energetic and has greater reflexes than the others. Due to his young age, Boi often befriends children despite being mature for his age.

As Tiger Ranger, Boi dual wields the twin Saber Daggers (サーベルダガー, Sāberu Dagā).

Boi is portrayed by Takumi Hashimoto (橋本 巧, Hashimoto Takumi).

==== Mei ====
Mei (メイ) is the 18-year-old princess of the Lithia Tribe who is known as the "Warrior of Love" (愛の戦士, Ai no Senshi) and fights as the pink-colored Ptera Ranger (プテラレンジャー, Putera Renjā). Although a gentle and loving young woman, Mei is also a warrior who refuses to lose, no matter how dire the situation is.

As Ptera Ranger, Mei wields the Ptera Arrow (プテラアロー, Putera Arō) bow.

Mei is portrayed by Reiko Chiba (千葉 麗子, Chiba Reiko).

==== Burai ====
Burai (ブライ) is the 32-year-old knight of the Yamato Tribe who is known as the "Warrior of Power" (力の戦士, Chikara no Senshi) and fights as the green-colored Dragon Ranger (ドラゴンレンジャー, Doragon Renjā) He is the oldest Zyuranger and is Geki's biological older brother, whom he was separated from when Geki was still an infant after his birth father was forced to hand Geki over to the Yamato Tribe's King and Queen after rebelling against him. Burai's father then used this as an opportunity to challenge the King in order to reclaim Geki, only to be defeated. Before dying, he told Burai to avenge his death. Burai froze himself in a separate sleeping chamber from the others and is the last Zyuranger to be revived in the present day. After awakening in the present day, Burai discovers that he is living on borrowed time and preserves his lifespan by staying inside the Timeless Room after the cave he originally froze himself in collapsed and was revived by Clotho. After fighting against the Zyurangers for a while with the Hellfried sword as his weapon, Burai reconciles with Geki and joins the team. Burai eventually dies after helping the others and passes his powers onto Geki.

During the events of Kaizoku Sentai Gokaiger, Burai appears in a vision to Gai Ikari and grants him the Great Power of the Zyurangers, which is the GouZyu Rex mode of GouZyuJin.

As Dragon Ranger, Burai wears the Dragon Armor (ドラゴンアーマー, Doragon Āmā) collar, which grants the ability to generate force fields, and wields the flute-like Zyusouken (獣奏剣, Jūsōken; Beast Play Sword) short sword, which allows him to summon Dragon Caesar.

Burai is portrayed by Shiro Izumi (和泉 史郎, Izumi Shirō). As a child, Burai is portrayed by Hisashi Sakai (酒井 寿, Sakai Hisashi).

=== Guardian Beasts ===
The Guardian Beasts (守護獣, Shugojū) are the seven gods worshipped by the five ancient tribes that the Zyurangers come from, & they originally existed in one form as Ultimate Daizyuzin before splitting into seven separate forms due to being weakened after banishing Great Satan. When they first get in their cockpits, the primary Zyurangers use the Dino Crystals (ダイノクリスタル, Daino Kurisutaru) created from the Dino Medals within their Dino Bucklers to enable the Guardian Beasts to combine. When not in use, the Guardian Beasts can speak to the Zyurangers in their individual separate forms.

- Guardian Beast Tyrannosaurus (守護獣ティラノザウルス, Shugojū Tiranozaurusu): Tyranno Ranger's personal Guardian Beast that emerges from under the Earth when it is summoned and forms the head, torso, and upper legs of Daizyuzin. The biggest and strongest of the five main Guardian Beasts, it can finish off giant Dora Monsters with its disintegrating Tyranno Sonic (ティラノソニック, Tirano Sonikku) shockwave. It is also able to stand on its tail to deliver jump kicks to its enemies. Tyrannosaurus is voiced by Eiji Maruyama (丸山 詠二, Maruyama Eiji), who also voices Daizyuzin and Gouryuzin.
- Guardian Beast Zyu Mammoth (守護獣ジューマンモス, Shugojū Jū Manmosu): Mammoth Ranger's personal Guardian Beast that emerges from a glacial area when it is summoned and forms the back and arms of Daizyuzin and Gouryuzin. It can emit a glacial gas called the Moth Blizzard (モスブリザード, 'Mosu Burizādo) from its trunk to freeze enemies.
- Guardian Beast Triceratops (守護獣トリケラトプス, Shugojū Torikeratopusu): Tricera Ranger's personal Guardian Beast that emerges from a desert area when it is summoned and forms the lower left leg of Daizyuzin and Gouryuzin. Its two horns can be shot to capture enemies with chains. It is also equipped with a pair of Tricera Cannons (トリケラカノン, Torikera Kanon) on the tip of its tail.
- Guardian Beast Saber Tiger (守護獣サーベルタイガー, Shugojū Sāberu Taigā): Tiger Ranger's personal Guardian Beast that emerges from a jungle area when it is summoned and forms the lower right leg of Daizyuzin and Gouryuzin. Its running speed exceeds that of all the other Guardian Beasts. It is also equipped with a pair of Saber Guns (サーベルガン, Sāberu Gan) on its tail. Saber Tiger is voiced by Masaki Terasoma (寺杣 昌紀, Terasoma Masaki).
- Guardian Beast Pteranodon (守護獣プテラノドン, Shugojū Puteranodon): Ptera Ranger's personal Guardian Beast that emerges from a volcano when it is summoned and forms the chest plate of Daizyuzin. It is the only Guardian Beast capable of flight and emits a pair of laser beams known as the Ptera Beam (プテラビーム, Putera Bīmu) from its wings.
- Guardian Beast Dragon Caesar (守護獣ドラゴンシーザー, Shugojū Doragon Shīzā): Dragon Ranger's personal Guardian Beast that emerges from Tokyo Bay when it is summoned through the Zyusouken's summoning melody and forms the head, torso, and upper legs of Gouryuzin. It has a drill on its tail and can launch a barrage of missiles from its fingertips that are powerful enough to destroy giant Dora Monsters. After Burai's death, Dragon Caesar becomes depressed, but soon realizes that the other Guardian Beasts still need its help and accepts Geki as its new master.
- Beast Knight God King Brachion (獣騎神キングブラキオン, Jūkishin Kingu Burakion): The biggest of the seven Guardian Beasts and the only one without a pilot, it emerges from a misty forest valley when it is summoned. When it first appears, King Brachion tests Geki and Burai if they are worthy of the Thunder Slingers under its guard. Afterwards, it comes to the Zyurangers' aid whenever it is needed and helps form Ultimate Daizyuzin under Tyranno Ranger's command. When the Dinosaur Eggs are recovered, they are placed into King Brachion's care for 60 days.

==== Daizyuzin ====
Daizyuzin (大獣神, Daijūjin; Great Beast God) is the Zyurangers' first giant robot composed of the five main Guardian Beasts via Evolving Combination (進化合体, Shinka Gattai) who wields the Dinosaur Sword God Horn (恐竜剣ゴッドホーン, Kyōryūken Goddo Hōn) and the Mammoth Shield (マンモスシールド, Manmosu Shīrudo). He can also fire energy beams from his eyes, horns, crests, and Mammoth Shield. His finisher is the Super Legend Lightning Slash (超伝説雷光斬り, Chō Densetsu Raikō Giri). Additionally, he can assume other forms, such as the following:

- Dino Tanker (ダイノタンカー, Daino Tankā): An intermediate tank-like arrangement of Daizyuzin's components meant for armoured warfare, though normally seen as a transitional form prior to his default form. In battle, he is equipped with a pair of Beast Tank Cannons (獣戦車キャノン, Jūsensha Kyanon) and can fire Beast Tank Storm (獣戦車ストーム, Jūsensha Sutōmu) laser beams from his components' eyes.
- Zyutei Daizyuzin (獣帝大獣神, Jūtei Daijūjin): The Beast Emperor Combination (獣帝合体, Jūtei Gattai) of Daizyuzin and Dragon Caesar that grants the ability to fire Kaiser Burst (カイザーバースト, Kaizā Bāsuto) energy beams from his chest and shoulder armor. His finisher is the Empire Attack (エンパイアアタック, Enpaia Atakku).
- Ultimate Daizyuzin (究極大獣神, Kyūkyoku Daijūjin) The Ultimate Combination (究極合体, Kyūkyoku Gattai) of Daizyuzin, Dragon Caesar, and King Brachion. His finisher is the Grand Banisher (グランバニッシャー, Guran Banisshā).
- Black Daizyuzin (ブラック大獣神, Burakku Daijūjin): A black/gold-colored form of Daizyuzin upon being brainwashed to serve Bridan. This form appears exclusively in No.1 Sentai Gozyuger.
  - Universe Daizyuzin (ユニバース大獣神, Yunibāsu Daijūjin): A variation of Black Daizyuzin that replaces Zyu Mammoth, Triceratops, and Saber Tiger with Gao Shark and Tiger, Engine Speedor, and the Ryu and Kuma Origami, allowing the giant robot to perform the finishers of Gao King, EngineOh, and ShinkenOh.

==== Gouryuzin ====
Gouryuzin (剛龍神, Gōryūjin; Mighty Dragon God) is the Zyurangers' second giant robot composed of Dragon Caesar, Zyu Mammoth, Triceratops, and Saber Tiger who wields the drill-like Mighty Dragon Spear Dragon Antler (剛龍槍ドラゴンアントラー, Gōryūsō Doragon Antorā) lance. His finisher is the Super Exploding Dragon God Thrust (超爆裂龍神突き, Chō Bakuretsu Ryūjin Zuki).

== Recurring characters ==
=== Barza ===
Mysterious Sage Barza (不思議仙人バーザ, Fushigi Sennin Bāza) is an immortal white wizard who serves as the Zyurangers' mentor. He watched over the Zyurangers during their long sleep while masquerading as the building superintendent of the Sakura Condominium, where the underground temple of the Zyurangers is located. During an earlier fight with Bandora, Barza was stripped of most of his magic by her.

Barza is portrayed by Jun Tatara (多々良 純, Tatara Jun).

=== Gnome ===
Gnome (妖精ノーム, Yōsei Nōmu) is the King of the Elves and an old friend of Barza's. During the Dora Circe battle, Gnome saves the Zyurangers before making them accept his challenge of eating all the food on the table he conjured. Though Boi manages to finish the last ounce of food, it is his selfless motivation that convinces Gnome to give them the Moly.

Gnome is also the keeper of Burai's key, hoping that Burai would simply never be revived. When his grandson Ryuta takes the key, Gnome attempts to stop him even it means killing his grandson.

Gnome is portrayed by Rikiya Iwaki (岩城 力也, Iwaki Rikiya).

=== Lamp Fairy Gin ===
Lamp Fairy Gin (ランプの精・ジン, Ranpu no Sei Jin) is a jackal-like genie who has the power to grant wishes. He ends up in the hands of four children whom he becomes fond friends with. He is revealed to be the genie from the tale of "Aladdin and the Magic Lamp" which he confirms was factual. Bandora manages to steal the lamp, shattering it in the process. However, while the Zyurangers and the children help Gin gather the lamp pieces, Bandora creates a personal lamp for him which sucks Djinn in and turns him into the monster known as Dora Gin (ドーラジン, Dōra Jin). After his original lamp is restored, Mei destroys Bandora's evil one causing Djinn to return to his true lamp and be restored normal. He is then sealed away for a time to keep his powers from being used for evil until the threat of Bandora is over.

Gin is voiced by Eisuke Yoda (依田 英助, Yoda Eisuke).

=== Fairy Dondon ===
Fairy Dondon (妖精ドンドン, Yōsei Dondon) is an elf who applies for a job to be Pleprechuan's assistant, but is kicked out by Bandora. Dondon meets a kindred spirit in Toshio, a boy who gets frequently picked on by his overly-strict mother. They become friends and go around sucking things into Dondon's magic bottles — including planes and buildings with people inside. After seeing DonDon trapping Boi and Dan in his bottle, Bandora decides to recruit Dondon, promising both him and Toshio the power to get back at all the people who push them around. However, the Zyurangers manage to convince Toshio and Dondon that there are people who care about them. After he and Toshio return everything to normal, Dondon goes on his way, but not before giving Toshio a black/gold-colored toy replica of Daizyuzin.

DonDon is voiced by Osamu Kato (加藤 治, Katō Osamu).

=== Ryota ===
Ryota (良太, Ryōta) is Gnome's grandson. 170 million years ago, Burai saved him from a rock that threatened to crush him. In the present day while living among humans in secret, Ryota takes Gnome's key and unseals Burai against his grandfather's wishes, but feels betrayed after seeing how cruel Burai has become.

Ryota is portrayed by Hiroki Uemura (上村 裕樹, Uemura Hiroki).

=== Dinosaur Eggs ===
After the war with Bandora ended, the heads of the five ancient tribes placed two Dinosaur Eggs (恐竜の卵, Kyōryū no Tamago) within a chest and sent it off to sea, hoping for a safer place and time for dinosaurs. The chest drifted over to Dalos Island, where the Apelo Tribe resided. The Guardian Beasts appeared to the Apelo and entrusted them to protect the eggs until the Zyurangers returned to this world. After several attempts by Bandora to use them for her evil deeds, the Zyurangers finally claim the eggs and send them to King Brachion to incubate the eggs inside its body. The book known as "Dino Revelation" mentions that the eggs are the last pair of dinosaurs on Earth and if they are destroyed, the dinosaurs will become extinct from this world. After Dora Talos' destruction, the eggs finally hatch into two Tyrannosaurus hatchlings (one male and one female) and are now in the care of Satoshi and his friends.

=== Clotho ===
Spirit of Life Clotho (命の精霊クロト, Inochi no Seirei Kuroto) is an entity who takes on the form of a childlike being and possesses the power of life itself. When the Zyurangers go into suspended animation, Burai follows them in his own chamber. However, an earthquake causes the cave where Burai was sleeping to collapse, crushing Burai to death. Daizyuzin asks Clotho to restore Burai's life, since he is the only person who can summon Dragon Caesar. Burai is restored to life, but only with a limited lifespan. Shortly after his revival and subsequent betrayal of Bandora, Clotho takes Burai to the Lapseless Room and gives him the Beast Play Sword. Clotho tells Burai that he only has a limited lifespan and leaves him with a green candle that represents the time he has left. The Lapseless Room is a chamber where time stands still, and every time Burai goes out to aid his brother, the candle gradually melts away. After Bandora destroys the room, Goushi and Dan attempt to get the Water of Life from its guardian, who is actually Clotho in disguise. She reveals that even with the Water of Life, Burai's life cannot be saved, since he has already died once. Clotho convinces Dan and Goushi to fulfill Burai's last wishes by giving the water to a boy in a hospital that Burai earlier befriended and save his life instead.

Clotho is portrayed by Mayumi Sakai (酒井 麻由美, Sakai Mayumi).

=== Ancient Tribes ===
==== Yamato Tribe ====
The Yamato Tribe (ヤマト族, Yamato Zoku) is Geki and Burai's tribe that worships the Tyrannosaurus and the Dragon.

===== Yamato King =====
The Yamato King is the co-ruler of the Yamato Tribe and the adoptive father of Geki. After the Black Knight was killed, Burai tried to avenge him, only for the Yamato King to be killed by Bandora.

===== Yamato Queen =====
The Yamato Queen is the co-ruler of the Yamato Tribe and the adoptive mother of Geki.

===== Black Knight =====
The Black Knight (黒騎士, Kurokishi) is Geki and Burai's biological father. A warrior who rebelled against the Yamato King, he was forced to give Geki up for adoption as punishment for his insubordination against the King. The Black Knight used this as an opportunity to challenge the King in order to reclaim Geki, only to be defeated. Before dying, he told Burai to avenge his death.

==== Sharma Tribe ====
The Sharma Tribe (シャーマ族, Shāma Zoku) is Goushi's tribe that worships the Mammoth.

===== Sharma King =====
The Sharma King is the ruler of the Sharma Tribe, and the father of Goushi and Otome. He appeared in a flashback in episode 15 where he died fighting the Henchman of Witch Bandora in order to buy them time to get away.

===== Otome =====
Otome is Goushi's older sister. She appeared in a flashback in episode 15 where died fighting the Golem Soldiers in order to buy Goushi time to get away.

=== Etoffe Tribe ===
The Etoffe Tribe (エトフ族, Etofu Zoku) is Dan's tribe that worships the Triceratops.

=== Dime Tribe ===
The Dime Tribe (ダイム族, Daimu Zoku) is Boi's tribe that worships the Smilodon.

=== Lithia Tribe ===
The Lithia Tribe (リシヤ族, Rishiya Zoku) is Mei's tribe that worships the Pteranodon. They are known archers.

==== Yui ====
Lithia Tribe Princess Yui (リシア族の王女ユイ, Rishiya Zoku Purinsesu Yui) is Mei's ancestor. She sacrificed her life to stop the plant demon Guzzler, which Dora Guzzler was modeled after.

==== Apelo Tribe ====
The Apelo Tribe (アペロ族, Apero Zoku) were the guardians of the orchards in Daizyuzin's realm until Dora Cockatrice tricked them into eating from the holy fruit that they were forbidden to eat, resulting in their exile to Dalos Island and turned into monkeys as punishment.

After Bandora's entrapment, the Apelo were reprieved of their curse as Daizyuzin restored their natural forms on the condition that they safeguard the last two Dinosaur Eggs. When Bandora learns of this, she sends her forces to take the eggs from the Apelo as Euro makes his way to Japan to find the Zyurangers. Though the Apelo fail to honor their covenant with the deity when the dinosaur eggs lost at sea during the ensuing battle, the pleading made by Euro's new-found friend Emiko and the Zyurangers convince Daizyuzin to renounce his curse and allow the Apelo back to his domain.

===== Euro =====
Prince Euro (ユーロ王子, Yūro Ōji) is the prince of the Apelo Tribe. is determined to redeem his people, being the only one of them who knows the eggs' location. Arriving in Japan and befriending a girl named Emiko, they are attacked by Golems as the Zyurangers arrive to save them. However, through Dora Cockatrice's deceptions, Euro is forced to reveal the eggs' location. However, Emiko and the Zyurangers pleas convince Daizyuzin to bring the Apelo back to its domain. As thanks, Euro gives Emiko a beautiful white dress before departing with his tribe to join the Guardian Beasts in their domain.

Euro is portrayed by Kazunari Sasaki (佐々木 一成, Sasaki Kazunari).

===== Crockle and Daisy =====
Prince Euro's two assistants and members of the Apelo tribe. Baron Crockle (クロックル, Kurokkuru) is the inventive footman while his wife Daisy (デイジー, Deijī) is the nanny. As well as the Volkswagen they used for travel, Crockle also made special glasses that allowed anyone who wore them to see a portal into Dora Cockatrice's dimension.

Crockle is portrayed by Takeshi Kuwabara (桑原 たけし, Kuwabara Takeshi) and Daisy is portrayed by Chigusa Takayama (高山 千草, Takayama Chigusa).

=== Bandora Gang ===
The Bandora Gang (バンドーラ一味, Bandōra Ichimi) are the nemeses of the Zyurangers. The members of the gang originated from Earth and emerged 170 million years ago during the same era the Zyurangers lived in. After being sealed away on the planet Nemesis which orbits Earth once every 230 million years, the Bandora Gang were released in the present day by two careless astronauts. Bandora and her minions were located at the Bandora Palace (バンドーラパレス, Bandōra Paresu; written as "Bandra Palace" on the sign), which was located on the Moon. Though their intent was making Earth a wasteland, they also caused mischief for the Zyurangers until they were sealed again in the finale.

==== Bandora ====
Bandora the Witch (魔女バンドーラ, Majo Bandōra) was originally the Queen of the Dahl Tribe. After her son Kai was killed when he was discovered breaking Tyrannosaurus eggs by being chased off a cliff by a mother Tyrannosaurus, Bandora sold her soul to Great Satan for the power to become a witch and vowed revenge on the dinosaurs by killing children as part of her pact with Great Satan with the intention of wiping out the human race. Viewing herself as the greatest witch ever known, she has seemingly unlimited magical abilities including enlarging her Dora Monsters. She has served as the nemesis of the Zyurangers. Occasionally she has sung her theme song "Dora! The Song of Witch Bandora". The song is sung after Burai first appears. She planned on making everyone dance to her song when she took over Earth.

Bandora gets extremely furious in a hilarious manner when defeated. She also experiences headaches at times, only to be comforted by her fellow warriors, usually Grifforzar. Moreover, Bandora does eccentric things such as going on a crash diet and dismissing her followers when they fail. When she created Dora Franke from the Dokiita Clay, she had her minions build the Saturn Tower. After which, she performed the Strongest of Black Magic rituals, which is used in the summoning of Great Satan, and this nearly kills her.

She loses her powers after shedding a tear over Kai's death (after being resurrected by Great Satan to pilot Dora Taros) as a witch loses her powers upon crying. Powerless, Bandora and her henchmen are sealed away and exiled to space by Daizyuzin. She is overwhelmed by the cuteness of Lamy and Grifforzar's son and cradles him around, proving she has, in the end, regained a part of her former goodness.

Bandora's staff, the Dora Sceptre, can do many magic tricks, including making the Dora Monsters grow. She often looks down at Earth through her Dora Scope.

Bandora is portrayed by Machiko Soga (曽我 町子, Soga Machiko).

==== Grifforzar ====
Grifforzar (グリフォーザー, Gurifōzā) is a manticore-themed knight who wields the Grifocaliber IV sword and can fly with the help of his retractable wings. He is also Lamy's husband. Grifforzar was mute until Lamy came along (he saved his voice for her to hear). Despite being mute, he was still capable of giving commands to his soldiers with his vicious personality. Griffozar had a frequent rivalry with Tyranno Ranger. He is violent and possesses amazing strength. Griffozar is a dangerous opponent as evident by being able to outlast and defeat Daizyuzin. Even alone, he proved to be more than a match for the Zyurangers in their early battles. He had a son with Lamy towards the end of the series, which Bandora adored. Unlike the others, he is much less vicious than his fellow lackies.

Grifforzar is initially voiced by Yoshimasa Chida (千田義正, Chida Yoshimasa) and later by Kan Tokumaru (徳丸 完, Tokumaru Kan).

==== Lamy ====
Secret Scorpion Agent Lamy (秘密蠍官ラミイ, Himitsu Sasorikan Ramī) is the human-looking servant of Bandora in scorpion-like armor who was sent after the Dinosaur Eggs before her mistress and her group were sealed. Unable to find the eggs, Lamy was forced to wait 170 million years for the return of her husband Grifforzar, whom she calls "darling". She was reunited with him when she found the eggs. Lamy wields the Lamy Boomerang, a crescent-shaped blade that can also be a sword.

When she is enlarged, Lamy assumes the form of Lamy-Scorpion (ラミィスコーピオン, Ramī Sukōpion), a scorpion monster with a scorpion chelae for a right hand and an electrocuting stinger on her scorpion tail-like ponytail. This form of Lamy is a dangerous opponent to the Zyurangers and even more with Grifforzar's help as they held Daizyuzin at bay during an eclipse before an enlarged Dragon Ranger appeared to finish the giant off.

When the Zyurangers were dealing with Dora Silkis, Lamy found a rival in Mei in the art of disguises. She gave birth to a baby boy at the end of the series, who looks human like her. She is sealed away during the finale alongside the other main villains and has a son with Grifforzar which Bandora adored.

Lamy is portrayed by Ami Kawai (河合 亜美, Kawai Ami).

==== Totpat ====
Totpat (トットパット, Tottopatto) is a vampire who has never tasted blood and is a scatterbrained alchemist. He often talks very fast when nervous and is able to take human form. Totpat is the companion of Bookback, whom he picks on for being slow. Totpat is also much of a comedy relief. He attempted to taste the blood of a youth until a little girl named Michi intervened, with him vowing to get back at her for stepping on his foot while he hid away from her. Totpat nearly tried to taste the girl's blood with Dora Argus' aid until Dan intervened. He also made a potion that makes people's personalities change (done with Dan and Mei) which could be cured by a rare herb called the Mandragora. His name is an ironic pun on "bat" and "tooth", as he is a somewhat harmless and funny vampire.

Totpat is voiced by Kaoru Shinoda (篠田 薫, Shinoda Kaoru).

==== Bookback ====
Bookback (ブックバック, Bukkubakku) is a blue-skinned hobgoblin who records all of Bandora's evil deeds as her bookkeeper. He is able to assume human form. Bookback is extremely stupid, short-witted, and a cowardly cheat who'd do anything to win. Bookback has a large appetite and usually provides comic relief, along with Totpat. He also annoys and/or angers Bandora quite frequently. Bookback wields a pistol for battle, though it is useless in most situations.

Bookback is voiced by Takeshi Watabe (渡部 猛, Watabe Takeshi).

==== Pleprechuan ====
Pleprechaun (プリプリカン, Puripurikan) is a leprechaun/terrier-like potter who forges the Dora Monsters and Golem Soldiers out of clay and is focused on his craft as he brings them to live with his Nendora Machine. He rarely shows up in battle and focuses more on enemy tactics. While working for Bandora, Pleprechaun is not really an evil character, but rather a somewhat unusual artist. He hates being rushed, claiming "You can't rush perfection or it'll be ruined." He is extremely brilliant and somewhat all-knowing, though he isn't much of a comedy relief, compared to most of Bandora's Gang.

Pleprechaun is voiced by Yutaka Ooyama (大山 豊, Ōyama Yutaka).

==== Golem Soldiers ====
The Golem Soldiers (ゴーレム兵, Gōremu Hei) are warriors made out of clay. Their hands can change into boulder-fists and stone-blades. The Golem Soldiers' unorthodox tactics involve amassing in large numbers, dancing around enemies before going in for the attack and are able to regenerate their bodies after being destroyed. Two rocky armored versions of the Golems usually lead the others. They were eventually rendered obsolete when the Dokiita Golems were created.

The original Golem Soldiers were later summoned by Zaigan during Super Sentai World.

===== Dokiita Golem Soldiers =====
When the Dokiita Clay is found, Dokiita Golem Soldiers (ドキータゴーレム兵, Dokīta Gōremu) are made from it. The Dokiita Golems are stronger versions of ordinary Golem Soldiers, their regeneration abilities are advanced to the point that they each can split into two new Dokiita Golems from the scattered remains. Also, unlike the original Golems who have black eyes, the new Dokiita Golems have red ones and can fire lasers from their fingers. Geki and Burai retrieved the Thunder Slingers to defeat them.

The Dokiita Golems continue to appear in the series afterwards.

==== Great Satan ====
Great Satan (大サタン, Dai Satan) is an evil god that is depicted as a floating blue-skinned head and is the ultimate evil of the series. In the past, Great Satan used Bandora to try to destroy Earth 170 million years ago, but was banished back to Hell by Ultimate Daizyujin. In the present day, after having enough of the Zyurangers' interference, Bandora summons Great Satan with the help of the Satan Tower as her followers gather thirteen 10-year-old children as sacrificial payment in the Strongest of Black Magic ritual. Once he arrives, Great Satan uses his power to turn the Dora Monster Zombie Franke into Satan Franke. Great Satan is overpowered by Ultimate Daizyuzin, but brings Bandora's son Kai back to life to cement his pact with Bandora. Though he overpowers both Daizyuzin and Dragon Caesar, Great Satan is finally destroyed along with Dora Talos by Ultimate Daizyuzin's Grand Banisher.

Great Satan returns in the Super Sentai Strongest Battle mini-series when resurrected on the planet Nemesis by Rita, a sorceress who lost her homeworld and wanted to destroy what she considered an irredeemable universe. Rita orchestrated a tournament among the Super Sentai warriors to acquire the energy needed, bringing back Great Satan in his full-bodied form Ultimate Great Satan (究極大サタン, Kyūkyoku Dai Satan) before he is destroyed once more.

Great Satan is portrayed by Masahiko Urano (浦野 眞彦, Urano Masahiko) and voiced by Seizō Katō (加藤 精三, Katō Seizō).

==== Kai ====
Kai (カイ, Kai) is Bandora's ruthless son and the prince of the Dahl Tribe who dies when he is discovered breaking dinosaur eggs and falls off a cliff evading a mother Tyrannosaurus. He is resurrected by Great Satan as the main pilot of Dora Talos. He would not let his mother hug him whenever she wanted to. When Dora Talos is eventually destroyed by Daizyuzin, a mortally wounded Kai struggles to make his way back to Bandora and dies in his mother's arms and faded away to Heaven.

Kai is portrayed by Issei Takahashi (高橋 一生, Takahashi Issei).

==== Dora Taros ====
Dora Taros (ドーラタロス, Dōra Tarosu) is a white knight-themed mecha piloted by Bandora's resurrected son Kai. It has various weapons, including the Taro Missiles, Taro Beam and Taro Punch, and could use Kai's telekinesis. After being destroyed by Ultimate Daizyuzin, Bandora cast a spell that caused the ground to collapse from underneath King Brachion, causing him to sink into the ground, with the Dinosaur Eggs inside of him.

Once Great Satan appears on Earth, Bandora rebuilds Dora Taros with two extra horns on the sides of its head and extended blades from its arms which it uses to sever Daizyuzin's left arm and half of Dragon Caesar's tail, leaving Bandora free to cast a spell that causes the two giant robots to disappear. The Zyurangers later learn from Burai's spirit that the Guardian Beasts are trapped in Bandora's Magic Realm. The Zyurangers escape after smashing the globes containing their Guardian Beasts and attack Dora Taros through several quickly-ascending stages: separate Guardian Beasts, Daizyuzin, Dragon Caesar, Gouryuzin and finally Ultimate Daizyuzin destroying both Great Satan and Dora Taros forever.

==== Dora Monsters ====
The Dora Monsters (ドーラモンスター, Dōra Monsutā) are made out of clay by Pleprechaun and processed by the Neodora Machine (ネンドーラマシン, Neodōra Mashin) oven into human size. Throwing her DoraSceptor to Earth, usually when her Dora Monster is defeated, Bandora conjures the spell "Evil spirits that sleep in the ground, give more power to Dora (name of Dora monster)!" to regenerate the defeated Dora monster into a giant.

- Dora Titan (ドーラタイタン, Dōra Taitan) is a 40-meter (130 ft) giant knight-themed Dora Monster with a sword. He takes away a shrunken space shuttle that has two children - Satoru Yoshimaru and Yumeko Ishida - trapped inside. He gave the Zyurangers a run for their money until Tyrannosaurus emerged. Killed by Tyrannosaurus after Dora Skeleton was killed.
- Dora Skelton (ドーラスケルトン, Dōra Sukeruton) is a skeleton-themed Dora Monster with a large hat, who could reassemble his body after being blown apart. The Zyurangers went after him when Dora Skeleton was sent to retrieve a shuttle. His flying, disembodied skull could teleport people to a shadowy world. He was the only Dora Monster with his own grunts called Skeleton Warriors which are skeleton-themed Golem Soldiers. He was killed when Tiger Ranger threw his head down a lava pit causing his body to be destroyed. He is voiced by Yoshio Kawai (河合 義雄, Kawai Yoshio).
- Dora Minotaur (ドーラミノタウロス, Dōra Minotaurosu) is a Minotaur-themed Dora Monster that was used in an attempt to keep the Zyurangers from gaining the Legendary Weapons and from saving a boy named Hiroshi. Wielding a spiked club and shield, he could burrow underground. Dora Minotaur could also shoot lightning from his horns and breathe a stream of fire. He received the full-brunt of the Howling Cannon which in turn killed him. He is voiced by Kazuhiko Kishino (岸野 一彦, Kishino Kazuhiko).
- Dora Sphinx (ドーラスフィンクス, Dōra Sufinkusu) is a winged sphinx-themed Dora Monster that wields a scepter and shoots a laser from the cobra ornament on his headdress, which is his power source and his only weakness. Posing as a game show host in a tuxedo and pharaoh's head-dress, he offered children a chance to win a trip around the world in his "Ultra Riddle Contest" if they answer all five riddles. However most of the riddles are unanswerable and those who fail to answer correctly or run out of time infuriate Dora Sphinx, who blows them away with his wings, imprisoning them into trees that are soon to be cut down to make way for a golf course. After capturing Boi on Bandora's order, Dora Sphinx later captures Dan when he intentionally answered incorrectly to lead the others to the forest. There Dora Sphinx reveals his plan before taking the three Zyurangers to answer his questions. After getting Mei and Goushi, Dora Sphinx meets a worthy opponent in Geki. But after an argument over the answer to his hardest question, Dora Sphinx battles Tyranno Ranger until Bandora enlarges him and Tyrannosaurus gets Geki away to tell him to bring his team together to form Daizyuzin. Later, Sphinx resumes his attack on Tyranno Ranger with Grifforzar assisting him as Bandora enlarges the two to crush Geki. After finding the Dino Crystals, Tyranno Ranger frees the others as they arrive to his aid as they summon their Guardian Beasts and combine them into Dino Tanker and turn it into Daizyuzin. Though he had the advantage, Dora Sphinx challenges Daizyuzin to taking his Ultra Riddle Contest, to keep them from saving the kids as the lumberjacks arrive. However, playing on his pride, Geki intentionally tricks Dora Sphinx into asking a question with the answer being his weak spot, knowing that he always reveals the correct answer when a wrong answer is given, using that knowledge to use the God Horn to deliver the fatal blow. He is voiced and portrayed by Isamu Ichikawa (市川 勇, Ichikawa Isamu).
- Dora Goblin (ドーラゴブリン, Dōra Goburin) is a Viking-helmet wearing goblin-themed Dora Monster that dines on the souls of children (little balls). In battle, he uses a rake as his weapon and can fire powerful lightning from the horns on his helmet. Using his accordion, he enchants children to run off toward a bus stop, where Bookback and Totpat take their souls, before dropping their souless bodies off to be found. Dora Goblin can become invisible to adult eyes, giving him an advantage over the Zyurangers, when they end up at the monster's base, Goblin Saloon, in spite of a boy named Toru attempting to help them. With some trickery on Geki's part, Dora Goblin is tricked into putting his shoes on the wrong feet, rendering him visible, as the Zyurangers defeated him with the Howling Cannon. However, Goblin was revived/enlarged, using his accordion to confuse Daizyuzin with illusions, hence his shape-shifting abilities like Loki, until it was knocked away, putting a stop to the monster's music. He was then killed to release the souls he ate. He is voiced by Yoshio Kawai.
- Dora Circe (ドーラキルケ, Dōra Kiruke), also known as the Eating Monster, is a pig-themed Dora Monster with a body like a giant pig's head in a Roman helmet with two pig arms and pig hooves with human hands at both sides of his mouth, two pig legs, and a pig's curly tail, who uses a giant knife and fork as his weapons, and lives only to eat, appearing two millennia ago to induce a famine-based civil war in Greece, until defeated by Odysseus through the rare herb Moly. Circe was created, when Bandora decided to take a crash diet, and is annoyed at the enjoyment of the overweight Ariga family, having the monster eat their food for three days, and breaking their family bonds as a result. Dora Circe immediately began to eat everything in sight, and was too fast to be seen by normal humans, as he causes chaos across the city. When battling the Zyurangers, Dora Circe swallowed their weapons, but was knocked out by Gnome's golfing attacks, before he could eat the Zyurangers. Gnome revealed that he possessed Moly, and gave it to Boi, after he beat him in an eating contest. Through deception (with the Zyurangers offering him a sandwich, a strawberry shortcake, a sushi, a steak, and a hamburger), the gang managed to get Circe to eat the Moly (within the sandwich), which caused him to throw up everything he ate. Bandora was too-starved to grow her weakened monster, so he was killed by the Howling Cannon. He is voiced by Toku Nishio (西尾 徳, Nishio Toku).
- Dora Cockatrice (ドーラコカトリス, Dōra Kokatorisu) is a flying chicken-themed Dora Monster with a hat that has the power of creating illusions, wielding a pair of scissors, which he used to cut open a door in time and space to teleport during a fight. In the past, Cockatrice played a part in the Apelo Tribe's fall from grace. In the present, Dora Cockatrice kidnaps Prince Euro, and Emiko as Bandora attempts to force Euro to tell her where the eggs are, chasing after the two children. Provided with Clockle's special glasses, the Zyurangers find a portal leading to them to Euro as Cockatrice captures Emiko and forces the prince to reveal the location of the eggs. When Bandora has the Dora Monster send the girl falling to her death upon getting the info she needed, Daizyuzin grabs her before fighting the enlarged Dora Cocktrice as Euro and company try to beat Bandora to Dalos Island. Killed by Daizyuzin.
  - Dora Cockatrice II (ドーラコカトリス2号, Dōra Kokatorisu Nigō) is a version of Dora Cockatrice who was recreated by Bandora. He wields a pair of hedge trimmers and was able to fire crescent-shaped energy blades from the head-crest on his head. Once again, this creature was killed by Daizyuzin. Dora Cocatrice is voiced by Eiji Maruyama and is portrayed by Hideaki Kusaka (日下 秀昭, Kusaka Hideaki) in his human guise, while Dora Cocatrice II is voiced by Kazuhiko Kishino.
- Dora Argus (ドーラアルゴス, Dōra Arugosu) is a mass of eyeballs-themed Dora Monster who uses his heart, a giant eye, to send his victims into the Hallucination World, a place where their memories are used against them. He is sent to help Totpat in his revenge scheme on Michi by having her think that her own father is a vampire. The Zyurangers battle Dora Argus, who could reassemble himself if blown apart as long as his main eye was unharmed. As the others hold off Dora Argus, Tricera Ranger saves Michi before taking out the giant eye. Reasborbing his heart as he enlarges, Argus battles Daizyuzin, who uses the God Horn to destroy the Dora Monster's main eye. He is voiced by Kan Tokumaru.
- Dora Ladon (ドーララドゥーン, Dōra Radūn) is a reptile-themed Dora Monster with a lizard-like head, a snake-like tail, two cobras for arms, and two piles of snakes for legs. In addition, much of its lower jaw and torso are one big mouth that open up to shoot poisonous snakes that wrap around and weaken anyone. Dora Ladon's power source is the golden apple on his head, using it to power his snake arrows which cause small youth-draining apple trees to sprout from children's heads that would eventually consume them. The Dora Monster's only weakness is the Legendary Arrow, a weapon bestowed by the gods to the Risha Tribe. Knowing that Mei possesses the Legendary Arrow, Bandora had Totpat give her a poison apple, which put her to sleep when Dora Ladon makes his move. As Mei fights for her life, the other Zyurangers battle Dora Ladon as he spits out poisonous snakes that wrap around and weaken the male Zyurangers. Overcoming the poison in time, Mei arrives to her tean's aid and uses her Ptera Arrow to fire the Legendary Arrow to destroy the monster's apple and thus weakened him so he could be killing with the Howling Cannon. He is voiced by Yoshio Kawai.
- Dora Knight (ドーラナイト, Dōra Naito) is a knight-themed Dora Monster in black armor and an expert swordsman who used the Strongest Sword Durandal (最強の剣ヅランダル, Saikyo no Ken Durandaru), an evil sword which Bandora had a 10-year-old boy named Shigeru make at midnight on a full moon. This made Dora Knight invincible as Durandal corrodes any other weapon it clashes with. Dora Knight battles Goushi after Bandora lures him into a trap. Having Bookback and Totpat broadcast Goushi's fight to the other Zyurangers, they use the TV to travel to Goushi's location and help him, but are outmatched as Bandora enlarges Dora Knight who then overwhelms Daizyuzin. When Shigeru attempted to stop Dora Knight, the monster could not harm him because the sword can't harm its creator. Once Shigeru was in Daizyuzin, Dora Knight was powerless as Durandal is shattered, and he is defeated by Daizyuzin. He is voiced by Atsuo Mori (森 篤夫, Mori Atsuo).
- Dora Endos (ドーラエンドス, Dōra Endosu) is a tentacled plant monster of indeterminate species with plant-like tendrils created by Totpat and Bookback with the power to cause people to sneeze uncontrollably until they die of it. His own weakness is cold water which he fears. Posing as a clown, he created soccer balls that contained his sneezing powder, using a boy named Isamu to do the dirty work in targeting many of the soccer teams. Witnessing the first attack, Boi manages to find Isamu and chases after him until Endos infects Boi and attacks him in his true form before knocking into the river. While Boi is saved by Isamu, the other Zyurangers arrive with Grifforzar, Totpat and Bookback fighting them until Dora Endos sends them off sneezing to personally kill the Zyurangers himself before Bandora enlarges him so he can infect the entire city. However, learning Dora Endos' weakness, Boi has Zyu Mammoth freeze Dora Endos for Tyrannosaurus to finish the Dora Monster off with Tyranno Sonic. He is voiced by Kazuhiko Kishino and portrayed by Hiroya Kishibata (岸端 浩也, Kishibata Hiroya).
- Dora Pixie (ドーラピクシー, Dōra Pikushī) is a unicorn-horned boy with fangs, hooves, and wearing a baseball uniform. He refers to himself as Pitcher Pixie. He threw cupid-baseballs, which, when swallowed, made the victim become blindly in love with anything at first sight. Mei succeeded in breaking off his horn and not only canceled the spell, but also revealed Pixie's true giant ogre-themed form with hooves and a pointy tail. Using a pink mist, he made Mei and her little friends, Juro and Satoko, fall in love with him and call him master. First to be killed by Gouryuzin. He is voiced by Akiko Muta (むた あきこ, Muta Akiko) and portrayed by Kotaro Miura (三浦 幸太郎, Miura Kōtarō).
- Dora Tortoise (ドーラトトイス, Dōra Totoisu) is a tortoise-themed Dora Monster created by Totpat and Bookback who put its sculpture in the Neodora Machine. The monster's main attack is a traffic light sticking out of his neck. He could compel people to move perpetually (green) or freeze them in place (red). He also had a number of weapons hidden in his shell provided by Bookback which included a cannon, a baseball bat, and a metal hook. The only cure for his spells is the pollen of the Yasudani flower, which can be found on Espol Mountain. Killed by the combined teamwork of Dragon Caesar and Tyrannosaurus. He is voiced by Osamu Kato.
- Dora Tarantula (ドーラタランチュラ, Dōra Taranchura) is a tarantula Dora Monster held within a replica of the Fairy of the Forest, a fairy statue made by a nature lover named Dr. Nakuto Tsumura who died and left behind his two children, Taisaki and Michu. Referred to himself as the Legendary Spider (伝説のクモ, Densetsu no Kumo). The strange butterflies that surrounded the statue sprinkled a poison called Nemrebo on children. Goushi realized something was wrong and exposed the monster when he realized he was right. Dora Tarantula spewed an acidic foam and thick webbing to shock his enemies. He could also shoot beams from his eyes and mandibles, and exploding stingers from his body. He was unaffected by Zyu Mammoth's freezing technique. Killed by Gouryuzin. He is voiced by Eisuke Yoda.
- Dora Boogaranan (ドーラブーガラナン, Dōra Būgaranan) is a horned frog-like monster with an endless hunger who could swallow people, either from a beam projected from his horn or his long tongue after losing his horn. He could also create a force field around him to reflect energy. Boogaranan managed to eat all of the Zyurangers except for Mei, who used a trap to hit the monster's weak spot, its throat, to release the others from its belly. With that, Mei killed Boogaranan with the Ptera Arrow. He is voiced by Toku Nishio.
- Dora Guzzler (ドーラガズラー, Dōra Gazurā) is a pitcher plant/Venus flytrap-like Dora Monster who ingests flowers, expelling them as vampiric leeches. Guzzler proved too powerful for even Gouryuzin to fight. Mei was able to defeat it by repeating the same step her ancestor Yui had done at the cost of her life. However, while she lay down with a legendary lily to lure the monster, Mei was armed and managed to use her arrow to mortally wound Guzzler to make it unable to suck anything inside of it. Guzzler attempted to eat Mei only for Pteranodon to blast the monster's right arm off and it to be taken down by the Howling Cannon. He is voiced by Gennosuke Yokoi (横井 弦之助, Yokoi Gen'nosuke).

===== Dokiita Clay Dora Monsters =====
In response to the Zyurangers having Dragon Caesar and Gouryujin, Bandora's gang retrieves a batch of the new Dokiita Clay to create super-powered Dokiita Golems as well as new and stronger Dora Monsters called the Dokiita Clay Dora Monsters (ドキイタ粘土ドーラモンスター, Dokīta Kurei Dora Monsutā), which the Guardian Beasts say are powerful enough to fight the Gods.

- Dora Franke (ドーラフランケ, Dōra Furanke) is the first Dora Monster made from Dokiita Clay. He acts as a Frankenstein's monster-themed enforcer while Bandora's group mine for more of the clay, causing the cockroaches under the Lark Ramen restaurant to surface. He attempts to kill Dan when he and Shinji find out about the scheme. He overpowered Tricera Ranger and the other Zyurangers with his superior strength and neck bolt nunchakus. Bandora grows Dora Franke and the monster overpowers Daizyuzin before Bandora leaves with the Dokiita Clay, but Daizyuzin retreated and sent Geki and Burai to retrieve the Thunder Slingers. As the Zyurangers have their new weapons, Dora Franke is sent to Earth and grows again to fight Daizyuzin and Dragon Caesar. The Zyurangers then used the Ranger Slingers to critically damage the monster, and Gouryuzin fatally impaled him. However, the power of the Dokiita-Clay revives and transforms Dora Franke into Zombie Franke (ゾンビフランケ, Zonbi Furanke), a giant zombie monster. He later returns to stall the Zyurangers and Daizyuzin, so that Bandora has the chance to summon Great Satan. On Earth, Great Satan infused Zombie Franke with some of his power on Bandora's request, transforming the monster into the lethal demonic Satan Franke (サタンフランケ, Satan Furanke). He overpowered Daizyuzin and Dragon Caesar, by spraying white acidic foam that melted their bodies as they send the Zyurangers to the Lapseless Room. Satan Franke proceeds to infect everyone with a plague until the Zyurangers revive Daizyuzin and Dragon Caesar and combined them into Zyutei Daizyuzin to kill Satan Franke for good. He is voiced by Maroshi Tamura (田村 円, Tamura Maroshi).
- Dora Narcissus (ドーラナルシス, Dōra Narushisu) is a humanoid narcissus-themed Dora Monster, who is said to have life-giving powers. He absorbs humans through vines that protrude from behind and into his abdomen, and produces energy blasts from his eyes. He was used to make Geki hesitate to kill him due his hopes to keep Burai alive. Narcissus' weakness was in his own vanity, as he would stop to admire himself whenever he saw his reflection. He could also make himself grow without Bandora's magic. Daizyuzin took advantage of Narcissus' vanity in order to kill him. He is voiced by Masaki Terasoma.
- Dora Laygor (ドーラレイガー, Dōra Reigā) is a water fairy-themed Dora Monster with pigtails who possessed a blue jewel of great power on her crown, using it to send children to her dimensional realm where she turns them into a blue liquid. This liquid would then be used to create a massive storm that would wipe out the city. Both this jewel and a red one were sister fairy princesses (Sunlight Fairy Sunny's being red and Rain Fairy Rainy's being blue) whom Bandora turned into gems during the days of the dinosaurs. Only by the gems touching each other would the curse be lifted. Dora Laygor was invincible until the owner of the red jewel, Saori, slammed her jewel into the blue jewel and broke the curse. Rendered powerless, Dora Laygor was quickly killed by the Ranger Slingers. She is voiced by Rica Matsumoto (松本 梨香, Matsumoto Rika).
- Dora Ninja (ドーラニンジャ, Dōra Ninja) is a ninja-themed Dora Monster sent to capture the Elixir of Immortality, rumored to give extended life. He wields ninja-like weapons, including a kusarigama, a katana, and a cannon concealed in his left arm. Dora Ninja was also accompanied by ninja versions of the Dokiita Golem Soldiers. He was killed by Daizyuzin with help from King Brachion. Dora Ninja, along with Dora Gansaku, Dora Chimaera and Dora Mirage were revived as ghosts in Bandora's Magic Realm, when the Zyurangers went to rescue their Guardian Beasts. He was killed along with Dora Chimaera by Goushi when he threw his axe at them. He is voiced by Kazunori Arai (新井 一典, Arai Kazunori).
- Dora Ganrock (ドーラガンロック, Dōra Ganrokku) is a rock golem-themed Dora Monster that could shoot rocks out from his stomach, called the Ganrock Cannon. Whoever they hit, it weighed them down so much that they could not move. Dora Ganrock was destroyed by looking into the Mirror of Death. He is voiced by Toku Nishio.
- Dora Kinkaku (ドーラ金角, Dōra Kinkaku) is a bearded demonic samurai-themed Dora Monster who wields a large fan that he could use to blow people away, and a magic jar that could suck people inside, and trap them. He also used a pole as a weapon, as well as a rake. Kinkaku could also use the spikes on the side of his headgear as exploding darts. He was the first Dora Monster to be killed by Ultimate Daizyuzin. He is voiced by Shōzō Iizuka (飯塚 昭三, Iizuka Shōzō).
- Dora Silkis (ドーラシルキス, Dōra Shirukisu) is a silkworm-themed creature, and was the pet of Lamy's, and fed on children's souls. It managed to trap the male Zyurangers in a cocoon. It would later assume its full size, when Mei interfered one too many times. It was then enlarged, and soon after it was killed by Zyutei Daizyuzin. He is voiced by Kazuhiko Kishino.
- Dora Gansaku (ドーラガンサク, Dōra Gansaku) is a cyclops-themed Dora Monster that took on the forms of the Guardian Beasts. He could project energy beams from his eye. He first posed as Dragon Caesar, to lure Dragon Ranger out of hiding. Though he retreated, once the real Dragon Caesar appeared, Bandora succeeded in finding the location of the Lapseless Room and destroyed it. Dora Gansaku was later launched to attack as Gouryuzin. Burai called for Dragon Caesar, but despite defeating Dora Gansaku, as it posed as Daizyuzin, Gouryuzin again, and Tyrannosaurus, Dragon Caesar and Burai were on the verge of defeat. The other Zyurangers soon arrived and used the Ultimate Daizyuzin to finally kill it seconds before Burai's time ran out, and also saved the life of a boy named Kota. Dora Gansaku, along with Dora Ninja, Dora Chimaera and Dora Mirage were revivied as ghosts in Bandora's Magic Realm, when the Zyurangers went to rescue their Guardian Beasts. He died when he was thrown off a cliff along with Dora Mirage by Goushi. He is voiced by Rintaro Torii (鳥井 林太朗, Torii Rintarō).
- Dora Antaeus (ドーラアンタイオス, Dōra Antaiosu) is a giant bird/dinosaur/mountain-themed monster that absorbs the power from an enemy's attack and converting it into energy for his own use, causing him to be revived into a stronger form every time it was destroyed. This monster came along during a time when both Geki and Dragon Caesar were still suffering over the loss of Burai. Knowing this, Bandora took advantage of this and cast a spell that bound Dragon Caesar's arms to his sides. It also caused Dragon Caesar to hardly move, let alone fight, and became weaker and weaker. Daizyuzin had a tough time handling Dora Antaeus until Geki jumped inside and found the monster's heart. Geki summoned the Dragon Armor, revitalizing Dragon Caesar, causing him to overcome Bandora's magic, as he realized the others needed his help. Dragon Caesar used his tail to drill a hole into Dora Antaeus' chest, enabling Geki to escape with the monster's heart flying out, too. After Geki obliterated the heart, he and the others formed Ultimate Daizyuzin to finally finish off Dora Antaeus for good. He is voiced by Kan Tokumaru.
- Dora Chimaera (ドーラキマイラ, Dōra Kimaira) is a Chimera-themed Dora Monster with the head and arms of a humanoid lion, the hooves of a goat with its head on its chest, the dragon-like torso and wings, and a snake-headed tail. He could absorb people, to use their talents as his own, with the goat head creating tornadoes to trap his victims and their special weapons. Among those he absorbed were a pop music singer (Kaori Hayasaka), a baseball player (Nishizawa), a soccer player (Sugimoto), an archer (Yabuki), and a hockey player. Dora Chimaera could shoot beams from the eyes of his lion head with whiskers, and his goat head could also create gusts of snow. Dora Chimaera targeted Sayaka Yamazaki, a kendo woman whom Goushi befriended. Bandora decided to have Dora Chimaera possess Sayaka, managing to wound Goushi before Sayaka forced him out of her body. When he was challenged by the other four, Dora Chimaera easily overpowered them, beating them soundly before enveloping them in an energy cyclone, with the intent of adding to his collection. Goushi arrived and assaulted Dora Chimaera with extreme prejudice, freeing everyone he consumed. Dora Chimaera was enlarged as a snowstorm occurred and was killed by Daizyuzin. Dora Chimaera, along with Dora Ninja, Dora Gansaku, and Dora Mirage were revived as ghosts in Bandora's Magic Realm when the Zyurangers went to rescue their Guardian Beasts. He was killed along with Dora Ninja by Goushi when he threw his axe at them. He is voiced by Yoshio Kawai.
- Dora Unicorn (ドーラユニコーン, Dōra Yunikōn) is a winged Winged unicorn-themed Dora Monster with dragon-like hands and feet, who took advantage of an environmentalist boy named Kouichi so that any attack inflicted on Dora Unicorn was felt by Kouichi via the monster's horn. Kouichi managed to undo the synchronization with the memories of his father, as Geki succeeded in destroying the horn, putting the monster at a disadvantage. He could also flap his wings and create powerful gusts of air, which he tried to use to blow the Zyurangers and Daizyuzin away. It was killed by Daizyuzin while riding on King Brachion, then leaping into the air to finish it off with the God Horn. He is voiced by Atsuo Mori.
- Dora Mirage (ドーラミラージュ, Dōra Mirāshu) is a mirror-covered monster who along with four Dokiita Golem Soldiers disguised themselves as the Fake Zyuranger (偽ジュウレンジャー, Nise Jūrenjā), doppelgängers of the original Zyurangers, in a plan to frame them, with Dora Mirage disguising himself as Tyranno Ranger. Once exposed, he fought the Zyurangers personally, until he was killed by the Howling Cannon. Dora Mirage, along with Dora Ninja, Dora Gansaku, and Dora Chimaera were revived as ghosts in Bandora's Magic Realm when the Zyurangers went to rescue their Guardian Beasts. He died when he was thrown off the cliff along with Dora Gansaku by Goushi. He is portrayed by Rumi Watanabe (渡辺 るみ, Watanabe Rumi) in his human guise.

== Other characters ==
- Bomono Tribe: The Bomono are a tribe of children who live on Dalos Island and like to cause trouble.
- Goda (ゴダ, Gōda): Goda is an underground monster with the traits of a fish, a reptile, an insect, and a crustacean. She was powerful, but had a gentle heart, having saved a boy named Ippei Hirata. Goda rarely laid eggs, so she was extremely protective of her line to the point of attacking any potential threat. Goda lost her temper when two of her three eggs were devoured by Bandora's Gang, who blamed the Zyurangers. The Zyurangers tried to help Goda by telling her that they had nothing to do with the eggs, but Goda was too enraged and distraught to listen. After Goda ran off, Bandora toyed with Goda's emotions by saying she would restore her eggs if she destroyed the Zyurangers for her. She agreed, selling her soul to Bandora and being filled with a hatred of humans as she enlarged. Despite their pleas, Goda was too filled with hate and had to be killed by Gouryuzin. The last Goda egg would hatch eventually with a new Goda to be born.
