= Saber + Zenkaiger: Super Hero Senki =

Japanese superhero film

Japanese name
- Kanji: セイバー＋ゼンカイジャー スーパーヒーロー戦記
Transcriptions
- Revised Hepburn: Seibā Zenkaijā Sūpāhīrō Senki
- Directed by: Ryuta Tasaki
- Screenplay by: Nobuhiro Mouri; Junko Kōmura (Zenkaiger Plot Supervision)
- Story by: Nobuhiro Mouri; Junko Kōmura; Takuro Fukuda
- Based on: Kamen Rider by Shotaro Ishinomori Super Sentai by Saburo Yatsude
- Produced by: Shinichiro Shirakura
- Starring: Shuichiro Naito; Kiita Komagine; Fuku Suzuki; Ayumi Tanida
- Music by: Chumei Watanabe; Kenichiro Oishi; Kousuke Yamashita
- Production companies: Toei Company; TV Asahi; Toei Animation; Toei Video; ADK Emotions; Toei Advertising; Bandai
- Distributed by: Toei Company
- Release date: July 22, 2021
- Running time: 76 minutes
- Country: Japan
- Language: Japanese
- Box office: $4,128,826

Saber + Zenkaiger: Super Hero Senki (セイバー＋ゼンカイジャー スーパーヒーロー戦記, Seibā Zenkaijā Sūpā Hīrō Senki; Saber + Zenkaiger: Super Hero War Chronicle) is a 2021 Japanese superhero crossover film between the Kamen Rider and Super Sentai franchises and was released on July 22, 2021, in a double billing with a special film for the then-upcoming Kamen Rider Revice.

The casts of Kamen Rider Saber and Kikai Sentai Zenkaiger are featured, though some cast members of other series such as Mashin Sentai Kiramager, Kamen Rider Zero-One, Kamen Rider Zi-O, Uchu Sentai Kyuranger, Kamen Rider OOO, Samurai Sentai Shinkenger, Kamen Rider Den-O, Tokusou Sentai Dekaranger, Himitsu Sentai Gorenger and Kamen Rider also participate. Additionally, the titular protagonists of Kamen Rider Revice make their first appearance.

The film pays tribute to the 50th anniversary of the Kamen Rider franchise and the 45th anniversary of the Super Sentai franchise while also paying homage to the original creator of both, Shotaro Ishinomori.

== Plot ==
At the Sword of Logos' Agastya Base space station, the guardian Asmodeus rebels and takes control of all the books containing the Kamen Riders and Super Sentai's stories, merging them into one story. Meanwhile, Touma Kamiyama, Mei Sudo, and Yuri are transported to the world of Kikai Sentai Zenkaiger while the Zenkaigers except Juran are transported to the world of Kamen Rider Saber. Touma's group encounter Juran while he is searching for his teammates, help him repel one of Tozitend's attacks, and meet a young boy called Shotaro. Regrouping at the Zenkaigers' headquarters, they make contact with Kaito Goshikida's group through Secchan and learn of what happened from Sophia.

Suddenly, Asmodeus uses his powers to send Kaito and Rintaro Shindo to a world based on Journey to the West and Touma, Juran, Mei, and Shotaro to one based on Nansō Satomi Hakkenden. With help from several Riders and Sentai warriors they meet along the way, both groups get to the end of their respective stories and reunite to confront Asmodeus. However, he convinces Shotaro that both the Riders and Sentai groups should not exist as they always suffer over the course of their stories. Shotaro destroys his drawings, causing the Riders and Sentai to disappear. While vanishing, Touma discovers he and his friends were part of a story as well instead of the real world before waking up in a world where they live peaceful lives and the battles they faced never happened. Realizing that facing hardships is what makes heroes human and that Shotaro is actually a young, time-displaced Shotaro Ishinomori, the creator of the Riders and Sentai's stories, Touma finds and convinces him to create heroes again. Together, they create a new story called Super Hero Senki.

Concurrently, Asmodeus joins forces with the Riders and Sentai groups' enemies to take over the story worlds, only to be opposed by the Sword of Logos, Zenkaigers, Twokaizer, and their Rider and Sentai predecessors, who destroy the villains while Asmodeus is defeated by Kamen Riders Revi and Vice. Asmodeus absorbs his fallen allies' machinery to enlarge himself and transform into a dragon, but the Sentai warriors summon their mecha to join the Riders in destroying him. As the heroes return to their respective worlds, Kamen Rider 1 recognizes Shotaro as his creator. Though the latter realizes he is at a point in time where he is already dead, he rejoices knowing that his creations will continue inspiring others long after his death and promises to fulfill his dream of making hero stories before returning to his time. The Agastya Base's books are restored while Touma, Mei, and the Zenkaigers stop by the Colorful cafe to celebrate their victory and discuss Kamen Rider Revice's story.

== Cast ==
=== Kamen Rider series cast ===
- Touma Kamiyama (神山 飛羽真, Kamiyama Tōma): Shuichiro Naito (内藤 秀一郎, Naitō Shūichirō)
- Rintaro Shindo (新堂 倫太郎, Shindō Rintarō): Takaya Yamaguchi (山口 貴也, Yamaguchi Takaya)
- Mei Sudo (須藤 芽依, Sudō Mei): Asuka Kawazu (川津 明日香, Kawazu Asuka)
- Kento Fukamiya (富加宮 賢人, Fukamiya Kento): Ryo Aoki (青木 瞭, Aoki Ryō)
- Ryo Ogami (尾上 亮, Ogami Ryō): Yuki Ikushima (生島 勇輝, Ikushima Yūki)
- Ren Akamichi (緋道 蓮, Akamichi Ren): Eiji Togashi (富樫 慧士, Togashi Eiji)
- Tetsuo Daishinji (大秦寺 哲雄, Daishinji Tetsuo): Hiroaki Oka (岡 宏明, Oka Hiroaki)
- Yuri (ユーリ, Yūri): Tomohiro Ichikawa (市川 知宏, Ichikawa Tomohiro)
- Reika Shindai (神代 玲花, Shindai Reika): Mei Angela (アンジェラ 芽衣, Anjera Mei)
- Ryoga Shindai (神代 凌牙, Shindai Ryōga): Ken Shonozaki (庄野崎 謙, Shōnozaki Ken)
- Sophia (ソフィア, Sofia): Rina Chinen (知念 里奈, Chinen Rina)
- Sora Ogami (尾上 そら, Ogami Sora): Tenta Banka (番家 天嵩, Banka Tenta)
- Hayato Fukamiya (富加宮 隼人, Fukamiya Hayato): Mitsuru Karahashi (唐橋 充, Karahashi Mitsuru)
- Luna (ルナ, Runa): Mayuu Yokota (横田 真悠, Yokota Mayū)
- Aruto Hiden (飛電 或人, Hiden Aruto): Fumiya Takahashi (高橋 文哉, Takahashi Fumiya)
- Sougo Tokiwa (常磐 ソウゴ, Tokiwa Sōgo): So Okuno (奥野 壮, Okuno Sō)
- Kousei Kougami (鴻上 光生, Kōgami Kōsei): Takashi Ukaji (宇梶 剛士, Ukaji Takashi)
- Owner (オーナー, Ōnā): Kenjirō Ishimaru (石丸 謙二郎, Ishimaru Kenjirō)
- Takeshi Hongo (本郷 猛, Hongō Takeshi): Hiroshi Fujioka (藤岡 弘, Fujioka Hiroshi)
- Ohma Zi-O (オーマジオウ, Ōma Jiō; Voice): Rikiya Koyama (小山 力也, Koyama Rikiya)
- Momotaros (モモタロス, Momotarosu; Voice): Toshihiko Seki (関 俊彦, Seki Toshihiko)
- Urataros (ウラタロス, Uratarosu; Voice): Kōji Yusa (遊佐 浩二, Yusa Kōji)
- Kintaros (キンタロス, Kintarosu; Voice): Masaki Terasoma (てらそま まさき, Terasoma Masaki)
- Ryutaros (リュウタロス, Ryūtarosu; Voice): Kenichi Suzumura (鈴村 健一, Suzumura Ken'ichi)
- Kamen Rider Revi (仮面ライダーリバイ, Kamen Raidā Ribai; Voice): Kentaro Maeda (前田 拳太郎, Maeda Kentarō)
- Kamen Rider Vice (仮面ライダーバイス, Kamen Raidā Baisu; Voice): Subaru Kimura (木村 昴, Kimura Subaru)
- Revice Equipment Voice, Vistamp Voice: Shingo Fujimori (藤森 慎吾, Fujimori Shingo)

=== Super Sentai series cast ===
- Kaito Goshikida (五色田 介人, Goshikida Kaito): Kiita Komagine (駒木根 葵汰, Komagine Kiita)
- Juran (ジュラン; Voice): Shintarō Asanuma (浅沼 晋太郎, Asanuma Shintarō)
- Gaon (ガオーン, Gaōn; Voice): Yuki Kaji (梶 裕貴, Kaji Yūki)
- Magine (マジーヌ, Majīnu; Voice): Yume Miyamoto (宮本 侑芽, Miyamoto Yume)
- Vroon (ブルーン, Burūn; Voice): Takuya Sato (佐藤 拓也, Satō Takuya)
- Zocks Goldtsuiker (ゾックス・ゴールドツイカー, Zokkusu Gōrudotsuikā): Atsuki Mashiko (増子 敦貴, Mashiko Atsuki)
- Yatsude Goshikida (五色田 ヤツデ, Goshikida Yatsude): Ikue Sakakibara (榊原 郁恵, Sakakibara Ikue)
- Shiguru Oshikiri (押切 時雨, Oshikiri Shiguru): Atomu Mizuishi (水石 亜飛夢, Mizuishi Atomu)
- Chiaki Tani (谷 千明, Tani Chiaki): Shogo Suzuki (鈴木 勝吾, Suzuki Shōgo)
- Secchan (セッちゃん, Setchan; Voice): Misato Fukuen (福圓 美里, Fukuen Misato)
- Raptor 283 (ラプター283, Raputā Ni Hachi San; Voice): M·A·O
- Shou Ronpo (ショウ・ロンポー, Shō Ronpō; Voice): Hiroshi Kamiya (神谷 浩史, Kamiya Hiroshi)
- Doggie Kruger (ドギー・クルーガー, Dogī Kurūgā; Voice): Tetsu Inada (稲田 徹, Inada Tetsu)
- Akarenger (アカレンジャー, Akarenjā; Voice): Naoya Makoto (誠 直也, Makoto Naoya)

=== Super Hero Senki cast ===
- Shotaro Ishinomori (石ノ森 章太郎, Ishinomori Shōtarō): Fuku Suzuki (鈴木 福, Suzuki Fuku)
- Asmodeus (アスモデウス, Asumodeusu): Ayumi Tanida (谷田 歩, Tanida Ayumi)
- Rider World (ライダーワルド, Raidā Warudo; Voice): Atsushi Yanaka (谷中 敦, Yanaka Atsushi)
- Sentai Megid (戦隊メギド, Sentai Megido; Voice): Isao Sasaki (ささき いさお, Sasaki Isao)

== Promotion ==
A special episode of Kamen Rider Saber and the 20th episode of Kikai Sentai Zenkaiger, together referred to as the Movie Release Commemorative Combo Special (映画公開記念合体スペシャル, Eiga Kōkai Kinen Gattai Supesharu), aired on TV Asahi on July 18 to promote the movie.

== Production ==
Shinichiro Shirakura, one of the film's producers, has stated that Super Hero Senki will be the last crossover film between the Kamen Rider and Super Sentai franchises.

== Theme song ==
- "SPARK"
  - Lyrics: Atsushi Yanaka
  - Composition: Yuichi Oki
  - Artist & Arrangement: Tokyo Ska Paradise Orchestra
  - Vocals: Hajime Omori

== Reception ==
Saber + Zenkaiger: Super Hero Senki earned $4,128,826 at the box office.
