= List of Kamen Rider Saber characters =

The main heroes of Kamen Rider Saber. Clockwise: Kento Fukamiya, Ryoga Shindai, Reika Shindai, Sophia, Yuri, Ryo Ogami, Ren Akamichi, Tetsuo Daishinji, Touma Kamiyama, and Rintaro Shindo.

The ten heroic Riders of Kamen Rider Saber transformed.

Kamen Rider Saber (仮面ライダーセイバー(聖刃), Kamen Raidā Seibā) is a Japanese tokusatsu series that serves as the 31st installment in the Kamen Rider franchise and the second entry in the Reiwa era.

== Main characters ==
=== Touma Kamiyama ===
Touma Kamiyama (神山 飛羽真, Kamiyama Tōma) is a novelist who becomes the new Flame Swordsman (炎の剣士, Honō no Kenshi) after receiving a red Wonder Ride Book from Daichi Kamijo. When he was nine, Touma befriended Luna and Kento. When Kento's father Hayato defected to the Megids and kidnapped Luna, she and Touma tried to escape. While he was unable to save her, he was saved by Daichi, who told Touma he can decide stories' endings before giving the boy his Brave Dragon Wonder Ride Book. In the aftermath, Touma lost much of his childhood memories, but suffered recurring nightmares about Luna. Despite this, he remembered Kento's suggestion to become a novelist and opened an antique bookstore called the Fantasic Bookstore Kamiyama (ファンタジック本屋かみやま, Fantajikku Hon'ya Kamiyama).

In the present, as his home city is attacked by a monster from Wonder World, Touma activates the Wonder Ride Book in his possession and transforms into the new Kamen Rider Saber. Amidst his battles against the Megids, Touma discovers a strange connection to the mysterious Kamen Rider Calibur before discovering Daichi had become Calibur and betrayed the Sword of Logos. After Kento's apparent death and defeating Calibur, Touma eventually recovers his lost memories. While investigating conspiracies within the Sword of Logos, Touma is falsely branded a traitor by members of the organization's Southern Base and forced to go AWOL with Mei and Yuri. As his allies learn the truth however, Touma slowly reconciles his friendships with them. After rescuing Luna from the world of Void, she chooses Touma to wield Wonder World's power and become its guardian, which he accepts despite the risk of fading from existence. While fighting Storious, Touma acquires the Wonder Almighty Wonder Ride Book, which allows him to defeat the Megid, undo Storious' damage to Wonder World and Earth, revive himself, and freely visit his friends on Earth without vanishing. Touma later semi-retires from being Saber so he can resume his work as a novelist.

During the events of the film Kamen Rider: Beyond Generations, Touma comes out of retirement at Rintaro and Sophia's behest, reunites with their comrades of the new Sword of Logos, and joins forces with the Igarashi siblings and Fenix commander, Hiromi Kadota, to combat Diablo and the Crispers.

Utilizing the Brave Dragon (ブレイブドラゴン, Bureibu Doragon) Wonder Ride Book in conjunction with the SworDriver and the pyrokinetic Kaenken Rekka (火炎剣烈火; Flame Sword Raging Fire) knightly sword, Touma can transform into Kamen Rider Saber. While transformed, he gains the use of the God Beast Brave Dragon (神獣ブレイブドラゴン, Shinjū Bureibu Doragon) familiar for combat assistance. His personal vehicle is the Diago Speedy (ディアゴスピーディー, Diago Supīdī) (Note: While the show's official website at TV Asahi and several merchandise have "Diago Speedy" spelt as "Diagospeedy", the corresponding Wonder Ride Book has the space.) motorcycle, which is summoned from the eponymous Wonder Ride Book. He can also combine Brave Dragon with up to two other Wonder Ride Books to achieve the following forms:

- Dragon Jackun (ドラゴンジャッ君, Doragon Jakkun): A Wonder Rider accessed from the Brave Dragon and Jackun-to-Domamenoki Wonder Ride Books that grants similar capabilities as Ryo's Genbu Jackun form.
- Dragon Peter (ドラゴンピーター, Doragon Pītā): A Wonder Rider accessed from the Brave Dragon and Peter Fantasista Wonder Ride Books that grants similar capabilities as Rintaro's Lion Fantasista form.
- Dragon Hedgehog (ドラゴンヘッジホッグ, Doragon Hejjihoggu): A Wonder Rider accessed from the Brave Dragon and Needle Hedgehog Wonder Ride Books that grants similar capabilities as Kento's Lamp Do Hedgehog form.
- Dragon Hedgehog Peter (ドラゴンヘッジホッグピーター, Doragon Hejjihoggu Pītā): A Wonder Rider accessed from the Brave Dragon, Needle Hedgehog, and Peter Fantasista Wonder Ride Books.
- Dragon Eagle (ドラゴンイーグル, Doragon Īguru): An auxiliary form accessed from the Brave Dragon and Storm Eagle (ストームイーグル, Sutōmu Īguru) Wonder Ride Books that grants a pair of Vermilion Wings (バーミリオンウイング, Bāmirion Uingu) and the ability to generate tornadoes and/or fire whirls.
  - Dragon Eagle Butasan (ドラゴンイーグルぶた3, Doragon Īguru Butasan): An enhanced version of Touma's Dragon Eagle form accessed from the Brave Dragon, Storm Eagle, and Kobuta 3 Kyoudai Wonder Ride Books that grants similar capabilities as Ren's Ninja Butasan form.
  - Dragon Eagle Arthur (ドラゴンイーグルアーサー, Doragon Īguru Āsā): An enhanced version of Touma's Dragon Eagle form accessed from the Brave Dragon, Storm Eagle, and King of Arthur (キングオブアーサー, Kingu Obu Āsā) Wonder Ride Books that grants similar capabilities as his Dragon Arthur form.
- Dragon Arthur (ドラゴンアーサー, Doragon Āsā): A Wonder Rider accessed from the Brave Dragon and King of Arthur Wonder Ride Books that grants the use of the King Excalibur (キングエクスカリバー, Kingu Ekusukaribā) (Note: Alternatively, the show's official website at TV Asahi and several merchandise have "King Excalibur" spelt as "Kingexcalibur".) sword, which allows Touma to summon and control a giant-sized copy of the aforementioned weapon. He can also transform the giant King Excalibur into a mecha also known as King of Arthur, which wields the King Calibur (キングカリブル, Kingu Kariburu) sword, as well as transform himself into the Saver Saber (セーバーセイバー, Sēbā Seibā) flaming sword to be used by the aforementioned mecha.
- Crimson Dragon (クリムゾンドラゴン, Kurimuzon Doragon): A Wonder Combo accessed from the Brave Dragon, Storm Eagle, and Saiyuu Journey (西遊ジャーニー, Saiyū Jānī) Wonder Ride Books that grants the ability to generate Sun Wukong's Ruyi Jingu Bang.
- Saiyuu Dragon (西遊ドラゴン, Saiyū Doragon): An auxiliary form accessed from the Brave Dragon and Saiyuu Journey Wonder Ride Books that grants the ability to generate Sun Wukong's Flying Nimbus for Touma to ride into battle.
- Dragon Bremen (ドラゴンブレーメン, Doragon Burēmen): A Wonder Rider accessed from the Brave Dragon and Bremen no Rock Band Wonder Ride Books that grants similar capabilities as Tetsuo's Hansel Bremen form.
- Dragon Alangina (ドラゴンアランジーナ, Doragon Aranjīna): A Wonder Rider accessed from the Brave Dragon and Lamp Do Alangina Wonder Ride Books that grants similar capabilities as Kento's Lamp Do Alangina form.
- Primitive Dragon (プリミティブドラゴン, Purimitibu Doragon): Touma's super form accessed from the eponymous sentient Wonder Ride Book combined with Brave Dragon that grants the use of the God Beast Primitive Dragon (神獣プリミティブドラゴン, Shinjū Purimitibu Doragon) familiar for combat assistance. Due to its traumatic past, Primitive Dragon initially possesses Touma and fights in a feral manner. After Touma befriends it, the Wonder Ride Book allows him to utilize its powers freely. This form can also be used with other Wonder Ride Books, such as Lion Senki. Primitive Dragon's human form is portrayed by Kō Aoki (青木 凰, Aoki Kō).
- Dragon Televi-Kun (ドラゴンてれびくん, Doragon Terebikun): A special form accessed from the Brave Dragon and Televi-Kun (てれびくん, Terebikun) Wonder Ride Books that equips Touma with a left forearm-mounted blade. (Note: The Wonder Ride Book has "Televi-Kun" spelt as "TVKun".) This form appears exclusively in the Hyper Battle DVD special Gather! Hero!! The Explosive Birth of Dragon Televi-Kun.

Additionally, Touma can assume the following forms by using unique Wonder Ride Books in place of Brave Dragon:

- Dragonic Knight (ドラゴニックナイト, Doragonikku Naito): An evolution of Touma's Brave Dragon form accessed from the eponymous Wonder Ride Book that grants the ability to summon the God Beast Brave Dragon for him to ride into battle. In this form, he is equipped with the Dragonic Booster (ドラゴニックブースター, Doragonikku Būsutā) gauntlet, which allows him to perform enhanced Spicy (スパイシー, Supaishī) attacks.
- Elemental Primitive Dragon (エレメンタルプリミティブドラゴン, Erementaru Purimitibu Doragon): An evolution of Touma's Primitive Dragon form accessed from the Primitive Dragon Wonder Ride Book combined with the Elemental Dragon (エレメンタルドラゴン, Erementaru Doragon) Wonder Ride Book that grants the use of the God Beast Elemental Dragon (神獣エレメンタルドラゴン, Shinjū Erementaru Doragon) familiar for combat assistance and control over the elements of fire, water, lightning, earth, and wind. He can also lend Elemental Dragon to any of his allies with a corresponding element to enhance their own powers.
- Emotional Dragon (エモーショナルドラゴン, Emōshonaru Doragon): An evolution of Touma's Brave Dragon form accessed from the eponymous Wonder Ride Book that grants the use of the God Beast Brave Dragon, God Beast Rune Bright Dragon (神獣ルーンブライトドラゴン, Shinjū Rūn Buraito Doragon), and God Beast Rune Dim Dragon (神獣ルーンディムドラゴン, Shinjū Rūn Dimu Doragon) familiars for combat assistance. In this form, he is equipped with the left forearm-mounted Destruction Shield (滅壊の盾, Metsukai no Tate). This form first appears in the film Kamen Rider Saber Theatrical Short Story: The Phoenix Swordsman and the Book of Ruin.
- Kamen Rider Almighty Saber (仮面ライダーオールマイティセイバー, Kamen Raidā Ōrumaiti Seibā): An enhanced version of Touma's Rider form accessed from the Wonder Almighty (ワンダーオールマイティ, Wandā Ōrumaiti) Wonder Ride Book that grants the combined powers of all the Wonder Ride Books.
- Ghost Ijinroku (ゴースト偉人録, Gōsuto Ijinroku; Ghost Great People Record): A Kamen Rider Ghost-themed special form accessed from the eponymous Wonder Ride Book that grants the use of the 15 heroic Eyecons' Hoodie Ghosts for combat assistance. This form appears exclusively in the crossover web series Kamen Rider Saber × Ghost.
- Super Hero Senki (スーパーヒーロー戦記, Sūpā Hīrō Senki; Super Hero War Chronicle): A Zenkaizer-themed special form accessed from the eponymous Wonder Ride Book that grants the combined powers of all the main heroes of both the Kamen Rider and Super Sentai franchises. This form appears exclusively in the crossover film Saber + Zenkaiger: Super Hero Senki.
- Ultimate Bahamut (アルティメットバハムート, Arutimetto Bahamūto): A special form accessed from the eponymous Wonder Ride Book. This form appears exclusively in the stage show Kamen Rider Saber: Final Stage.

After combining the powers of all 11 Seiken, Touma acquires a secondary Seiken called the Haouken Xross Saber (刃王剣(ハオウケン)クロスセイバー(十聖刃), Haōken Kurosu Seibā; Blade King Sword Xross Saber), which he can use in conjunction with Brave Dragon and the SworDriver to transform into his final form; Kamen Rider Xross Saber (仮面ライダークロスセイバー, Kamen Raidā Kurosu Seibā). While transformed, he gains control over all of the Seiken and their elemental powers. Similarly to his previous forms, he can also combine Brave Dragon with up to two other Wonder Ride Books to achieve the following forms:

- Kamen Rider Crimson Saber (仮面ライダークリムゾンセイバー, Kamen Raidā Kurimuzon Seibā): A variant of Kamen Rider Xross Saber accessed from the Brave Dragon, Storm Eagle, and Saiyuu Journey Wonder Ride Books that grants similar capabilities as Touma's Crimson Dragon form.
- Kamen Rider Featuring Saber (仮面ライダーフィーチャリングセイバー, Kamen Raidā Fīcharingu Seibā): A variant of Kamen Rider Xross Saber accessed from the Brave Dragon, Lion Senki, and Lamp Do Alangina Wonder Ride Books that grants the combined powers of the Kaenken Rekka, Suiseiken Nagare, and Raimeiken Ikazuchi. Rintaro and Kento can also share this form's power through their respective personal Wonder Ride Books.

Touma Kamiyama is portrayed by Shuichiro Naito (内藤 秀一郎, Naitō Shūichirō). As a child, Touma is portrayed by Iori Maekawa (前川 伊織, Maekawa Iori) in the series and Tsubasa Arakaki (新垣 翼, Arakaki Tsubasa) in the V-Cinema Kamen Rider Saber: Trio of Deep Sin.

=== Mei Sudo ===
Mei Sudo (須藤 芽依, Sudō Mei) is a new editor of Biblio Utopia Publishing (ビブリオユートピア出版, Biburio Yūtopia Shuppan) who is in charge of publishing Touma's work. After Touma joins the Sword of Logos, Mei decides to help his ally Rintaro adjust to modern life and receives a special white book she can use to alert Touma and his allies to Megid attacks. Eventually, Mei begins a relationship with Rintaro and goes on to become a successful editor.

Mei Sudo is portrayed by Asuka Kawazu (川津 明日香, Kawazu Asuka). As a child, Mei is portrayed by Emiri Arai (新井 笑琳, Arai Emiri).

=== Rintaro Shindo ===
Rintaro Shindo (新堂 倫太郎, Shindō Rintarō) is the current Water Swordsman (水の剣士, Mizu no Kenshi) and student of Kenshin Nagamine before the latter was killed by Zooous, whom Rintaro developed a vendetta against. After meeting Touma, he senses the novelist's ability and asks him to join the Sword of Logos. When Touma becomes the new Kamen Rider Saber, Rintaro decides to stay in and work at the former's bookstore, developing a relationship with Mei along the way. Following the Sword of Logos' final battle with the Megid Storious, Rintaro is elected to become part of the organization's new ruling council.

Utilizing the Lion Senki (ライオン戦記, Raion Senki; Lion War Chronicle) Wonder Ride Book in conjunction with the SworDriver and the hydrokinetic Suiseiken Nagare (水勢剣流水; Water Current Sword Flowing Water) knightly sword, Rintaro can transform into Kamen Rider Blades (仮面ライダーブレイズ, Kamen Raidā Bureizu). While transformed, he gains the use of the Animal Lion Senki (生物ライオンセンキ, Seibutsu Raion Senki) familiar for combat assistance. He possesses a magical cellphone called the Gatrikephone (ガトライクフォン, Gatoraikufon), which is capable of transforming into the reverse Ride Gatriker (ライドガトライカー, Raido Gatoraikā) motor trike equipped with a pair of Gatling guns. He can also combine Lion Senki with up to two other Wonder Ride Books to achieve the following forms:

- Lion Fantasista (ライオンファンタジスタ, Raion Fantajisuta): An auxiliary form accessed from the Lion Senki and Peter Fantasista (ピーターファンタジスタ, Pītā Fantajisuta) Wonder Ride Books that grants the ability to open portals and the use of the Fighting Fairy (戦う妖精さん, Tatakau Yōsei-san) familiar for combat assistance. In this form, Rintaro is equipped with the left forearm-mounted extendable Capture Hook (キャプチャーフック, Kyapuchā Fukku).
- Fantastic Lion (ファンタスティックライオン, Fantasutikku Raion): A Wonder Combo accessed from the Lion Senki, Peter Fantasista, and Tenkuu no Pegasus (天空のペガサス, Tenkū no Pegasasu; Heaven's Pegasus) Wonder Ride Books that grants flight capabilities.

Additionally, Rintaro can assume the following forms by using unique Wonder Ride Books in place of Lion Senki:

- King Lion Daisenki (キングライオン大戦記, Kingu Raion Daisenki; King Lion Great War Chronicle): An evolution of Rintaro's Lion Senki form accessed from the eponymous Wonder Ride Book that grants the use of the Lion Mode (ライオンモード, Raion Mōdo) ability to transform into an Animal Lion Senki-like state. In this form, he is equipped with the twin shoulder-mounted King Lion Cannons (キングライオンカノン, Kingu Raion Kanon), which allow him to fire streams of pressurized water, and the King Lion Booster (キングライオンブースター, Kingu Raion Būsutā) gauntlet, which similar to the Dragonic Booster allows him to perform enhanced Burst (バースト, Bāsuto) attacks.
- Tategami Hyoujuu Senki (タテガミ氷獣戦記, Tategami Hyōjū Senki; Mane Ice Beast War Chronicle): Rintaro's final form accessed from the eponymous Wonder Ride Book that grants cryokinesis and the ability to summon the souls of deceased swordsmen, such as his teacher, for combat assistance.
- Specter Gekikou Senki (スペクター激昂戦記, Supekutā Gekikō Senki; Specter Enraged War Chronicle): A Kamen Rider Specter-themed special form accessed from the eponymous Wonder Ride Book that grants the use of the Deep Slasher. This form appears exclusively in the crossover web series Kamen Rider Specter × Blades.

Rintaro Shindo is portrayed by Takaya Yamaguchi (山口 貴也, Yamaguchi Takaya). As a child, Rintaro is portrayed by Haruto Ohno (大野 遥斗, Ōno Haruto) in the series and Reo Miyauchi (宮宇地 怜央, Miyauchi Reo) in the V-Cinema Kamen Rider Saber: Trio of Deep Sin.

=== Kento Fukamiya ===
Kento Fukamiya (富加宮 賢人, Fukamiya Kento) is Touma and Luna's childhood friend, son of Hayato, and a sage-class samurai and the Thunder Swordsman (雷の剣士, Kaminari no Kenshi) who was initially a member of the Sword of Logos before he became the third Dark Swordsman. Behind his cheerful demeanor are deep regrets for Luna's disappearance and his father's betrayal 15 years prior to the series, though he later discovers Hayato was seemingly killed by and lost his Rider powers to Daichi. After helping Touma recover his lost memories, Kento challenges Daichi to a duel to avenge his father, only to be defeated by him and consumed by the latter's sword. Following this, Kento's Rider equipment falls into Touma's care.

While trapped in the Ankokuken Kurayami, Kento discovers Isaac's conspiracy and witnesses visions of various futures wherein the world is either destroyed due to the Almighty Book or saved by Touma following his death. Traumatized, he frees himself under mysterious means, steals the Calibur equipment from Reika, becomes the third Calibur, and goes rogue to avert the visions' events by sealing all of the Seiken. While Touma and Yuri eventually save Kento from himself and convince him to help them stop Isaac, Kento remains resolute in his goal to save Touma and the world, temporarily continuing to use the Calibur title to honor his father's legacy. However, Kento learns Hayato survived and has a heart-to-heart with him, after which the former regains confidence in himself, reassumes his original Rider powers, and returns the Ankokuken Kurayami to Yuri. After saving Earth and Wonder World from Storious, Kento temporarily takes over Touma's bookstore until the latter returns one year later.

Eight years later, Kento takes a job as a translator and is engaged to be married to Yuina Tachibana.

Utilizing the Lamp Do Alangina (ランプドアランジーナ, Ranpu Do Aranjīna) Wonder Ride Book in conjunction with the SworDriver and the electrokinetic Raimeiken Ikazuchi (雷鳴剣黄雷; Thunderclap Sword Yellow Thunder) knightly sword, Kento can transform into Kamen Rider Espada (仮面ライダーエスパーダ, Kamen Raidā Esupāda). While transformed, he gains the use of the Genie of the Lamp Lamp Do Alangina (ランプの精ランプドアランジーナ, Ranpu no Sei Ranpu Do Aranjīna) familiar for combat assistance. Like Rintaro, he possesses his own Gatrikephone. He can also combine Lamp Do Alangina with up to two other Wonder Ride Books to achieve the following forms:

- Lamp Do Hedgehog (ランプドヘッジホッグ, Ranpu Do Hejjihoggu): An auxiliary form accessed from the Lamp Do Alangina and Needle Hedgehog (ニードルヘッジホッグ, Nīdoru Hejjihoggu) Wonder Ride Books that grants the ability to fire spine-like energy projectiles.
- Golden Alangina (ゴールデンアランジーナ, Gōruden Aranjīna): A Wonder Combo accessed from the Lamp Do Alangina, Needle Hedgehog, and Tri Cerberus (トライケルベロス, Torai Keruberosu) Wonder Ride Books that grants the use of the God Beast Tri Cerberus (神獣トライケルベロス, Shinjū Torai Keruberosu) familiar for combat assistance.

During the events of the V-Cinema Kamen Rider Saber: Trio of Deep Sin, Kento acquires the Arabiana Night (アラビアーナナイト, Arabiāna Naito) Wonder Ride Book and the Gekkou Raimeiken Ikazuchi (月光雷鳴剣黄雷, Gekkō Raimeiken Ikazuchi; Moonlight Thunderclap Sword Yellow Thunder) knightly sword, which he can use in conjunction with the SworDriver to assume his eponymous final form.

Kento Fukamiya is portrayed by Ryo Aoki (青木 瞭, Aoki Ryō). As a child, Kento is portrayed by Ryusei Miyamoto (宮本 琉成, Miyamoto Ryūsei) in the series and Isshin Fukumine (福峯 壱真, Fukumine Isshin) in the V-Cinema Kamen Rider Saber: Trio of Deep Sin.

== Recurring characters ==
=== Kamen Rider Calibur ===
Kamen Rider Calibur (仮面ライダーカリバー, Kamen Raidā Karibā) is a moniker used by those who inherit the title of the Dark Swordsman (闇の剣士, Yami no Kenshi). It was originally associated with the Sword of Logos until the original bearer of the name was manipulated by Isaac into siding with the Megids, at which point "Calibur" became synonymous with "renegade" until the third and fourth bearer fights alongside the Sword of Logos.

Anyone who becomes Calibur utilizes the Jaaku Dragon (ジャアクドラゴン, Jaaku Doragon; Evil Dragon) Wonder Ride Book in conjunction with the Jaken Calibur Driver (邪剣カリバードライバー, Jaken Karibā Doraibā; Evil Sword Calibur Driver) (Note: Alternatively, the show's official website at TV Asahi and several merchandise have "Calibur Driver" spelt as "Caliburdriver".) belt and the umbrakinetic Ankokuken Kurayami (暗黒剣月闇; Darkness Sword Moon Dark) broadsword in order to transform. While transformed, they gain the use of the God Beast Jaaku Dragon (神獣ジャアクドラゴン, Shinjū Jaaku Doragon) familiar for combat assistance.

After Daichi's identity as the second Calibur is exposed, he acquires the Jaou Dragon (ジャオウドラゴン, Jaō Doragon; Evil King Dragon) Wonder Ride Book, which he can use to assume his eponymous final form. In this form, he gains the use of the God Beast Jaou Dragon (神獣ジャオウドラゴン, Shinjū Jaō Doragon) familiar for combat assistance. After Kento becomes Calibur, Jaou Dragon gains the ability to seal the Seiken, which can only be undone if the owner is either fatally wounded or defeated.

==== Hayato Fukamiya ====
Hayato Fukamiya (富加宮 隼人, Fukamiya Hayato) is the father of Kento and the first Dark Swordsman who left the Sword of Logos 15 years prior to the series and allied himself with the Megids after the Ankokuken Kurayami subjected him to nightmares depicting his leader Isaac ending the world and ordering him to sacrifice Luna. This spurred Hayato to steal numerous Wonder Ride books and release the Megids on Earth as a cover to abduct Luna and uncover the truth of his visions, only to be mortally wounded by Daichi. Hayato was initially believed to have been killed, but Kento eventually learns his father suffered a near-death experience before he was saved by Tassel and became a spirit guardian of Wonder World (ワンダーワールド, Wandā Wārudo).

In the tie-in prequel manga Supplementary Volume Kamen Rider Saber: Kamen Rider Buster the Comic, which takes place 20 years prior to the series, Hayato aided his master, Toshikazu Kamikawa, in hastening his friendly rival, Ryo's, awakening as the new Earth Swordsman.

Hayato Fukamiya is portrayed by Mitsuru Karahashi (唐橋 充, Karahashi Mitsuru).

==== Daichi Kamijo ====
Daichi Kamijo (上條 大地, Kamijō Daichi) is the previous Flame Swordsman and the second Dark Swordsman. 15 years prior to the series, he is forced to fight Hayato to protect Touma and Luna from him. Failing to save her, Daichi left his Brave Dragon Wonder Ride Book with Touma before seemingly sacrificing himself in his pursuit of Hayato. Upon defeating Hayato and taking the Ankokuken Kurayami however, Daichi saw visions of the world's destruction. Discarding the Kaenken Rekka and faking his death, he aligned himself with the Megids as the new Calibur to "learn the truth of the world" and continue his fallen comrade's mission to expose Isaac.

After he resurfaces in the present and several battles with his successor, Daichi reveals his secrets to Touma and almost entrusts his Rider equipment to him before Desast mortally wounds the former while Reika steals his equipment before they eventually come into Kento's possession.

Daichi Kamijo is portrayed by Hiroyuki Hirayama (平山 浩行, Hirayama Hiroyuki).

==== Sophia ====
Sophia (ソフィア, Sofia) is a simulacrum based on a priestess who connected Wonder World and Earth two millennia prior, the protector of books for the Sword of Logos' Northern Base and the creator of the Wonder Ride Books who watches over Touma Kamiyama and the base's other swordsmen. After confronting her former apprentice, Daichi Kamijo, Sophia is kidnapped and imprisoned by Reika Shindai under the orders of her leader, Isaac, who created her as a possible replacement in the Greater Book's recreation ritual in the event that Luna could not be recovered. Despite this, Yuri and Touma are able to reassemble their fellow swordsmen before Kento Fukamiya rescues Sophia. As the Megid Storious enacts his plan to destroy Wonder World and Earth and due to her connection to the former, Yuri gives Sophia the Ankokuken Kurayami to protect her from fading from existence. She later uses the sword to become the fourth and final Calibur, aka the Dark Swordswoman, to aid the swordsmen in stopping Storious. Following the battle, Sophia is elected to become part of the Sword of Logos' new ruling council.

Sophia is portrayed by Rina Chinen (知念 里奈, Chinen Rina).

=== Tassel ===
Tassel (タッセル, Tasseru) is the guardian of Wonder World and the series narrator who gradually makes his presence known to Touma and the others, though he is unable to directly intervene in human world affairs. He was originally a human named Victor (ビクトール, Bikutōru), who came to Wonder World in the past alongside the first Master Logos, Storious, Legeiel, and Zooous, where they met a priestess who connected their worlds and chose Victor to defend Wonder World. When Storious deceived Legeiel and Zooous into becoming Megids and betrayed their friends, Victor created the Ankokuken Kurayami and Kougouken Saikou and helped Logos divide the Tome of Omniscience, keeping half with him in Wonder World while Logos returned to their world with the other half to ensure stability between the worlds. As part of his plans to destroy the world in the present, Logos' descendant Isaac banishes Tassel, but the latter's consciousness ends up in that of Touma and Primitive Dragon's until the novelist tames the Wonder Ride Book, freeing Tassel in the process. After taking time to regenerate, Tassel entrusts Touma and his allies with protecting Earth and Wonder World before he leaves to protect Luna, only to be killed by Storious, who steals his half of the Tome of Omniscience. Following this, his soul continues to reside in Wonder World along with those of Luna and the Megids.

Tassel is portrayed by Tobi from Les Romanesques.

=== Luna ===
Luna (ルナ, Runa) is Touma and Kento's childhood friend who, like the former, hails from Wonder World and serves as a link between it and Earth. After Isaac manipulated Hayato into targeting her, she attempted to run away with Touma, only to be pulled into and trapped in the world of Void. In the present, Touma eventually makes contact with her through their childhood book, Wonder Story, and brings her to the human world. She returns to Wonder World to stay with Tassel until Storious kills him, leading to Luna seeking refuge with the Sword of Logos. When Storious attempts to destroy Wonder World and Earth, Luna sacrifices herself to give Touma the Wonder Almighty Wonder Ride Book so he, Rintaro, and Kento can defeat Storious. Following this, her soul resides in Wonder World along with that of Tassel's.

Luna is portrayed by Miku Okamoto (岡本 望来, Okamoto Miku) as a child, and by Mayuu Yokota (横田 真悠, Yokota Mayū) as an adult.

=== Sword of Logos ===
The Sword of Logos (ソードオブロゴス, Sōdo Obu Rogosu) is a mysterious organization formed by a secret sect of swordsmen sworn to protect the ancient Greater Book (大いなる本, Ōinaru Hon) and keep peace in the world. They are led by an individual who holds the title of "Master Logos" (マスターロゴス, Masutā Rogosu), a member of a bloodline dating back to the first Master Logos. The highest authority who approve the organization's policies are the Four Sages (四賢神, Yon Kenjin) Following their final battle with Storious, the Sword of Logos chose to abolish the Master Logos and Sage positions in favor of a council of four.

The Kamen Riders of this organization each wield one of 11 unique Seiken (聖剣; Holy Sword) transformation swords composed of a singular element, which they can use to invoke their combat weapons and transform in conjunction with Wonder Ride Books (ワンダーライドブック, Wandā Raido Bukku), with some using either one of three scabbard-like Seiken SworDriver (聖剣ソードライバー, Seiken Sōdoraibā; Holy Sword SworDriver) belts or a Driver unique to their Seiken. Those who utilize the SworDrivers can use up to three books at once while those who only utilize a Seiken or separate Driver are limited to one at a time. While all of the Riders are able to assume varying Wonder Rider (ワンダーライダー, Wandā Raidā) forms based on the Wonder Ride Books in their possession, books with the same elemental affinity as their sword grant more power compared to those that do not, with the SworDriver users able to achieve Wonder Combo (ワンダーコンボ, Wandā Konbo) forms.

The gathered Seiken can be used to create the Almighty Book (全知全能の書, Zenchizen'nō no Sho), a relic created from one half of the Tome of Omniscience that can either place Wonder World and Earth on the brink of destruction or create new Rider powers.

==== Northern Base ====
The Northern Base (ノーザンベース, Nōzan Bēsu) is a branch of the Sword of Logos based in the North Pole and serves as most of the swordsmen's base of operations. Following Touma becoming Kamen Rider Saber, some of the organization's members choose to use his bookstore as a passageway from the Northern Base and back.

===== Ryo Ogami =====
Ryo Ogami (尾上 亮, Ogami Ryō) is an aggressive great swordsman of the Sword of Logos' Northern Base known as the Earth Swordsman (土の剣士, Tsuchi no Kenshi) and the oldest member of the group. He investigates Hayato's betrayal and defection from the Sword of Logos while caring for his son, Sora (そら), until he discovers Hayato was seemingly killed by Daichi and both were manipulated by Isaac. After saving both Wonder World and Earth, Ryo plans to retire from the Sword of Logos so he can pursue a teaching career and raise and teach new generations of swordsmen.

Eight years later, Ryo becomes a teacher at Kagari Elementary School (かがり小学校, Kagari Shōgakkō).

In the tie-in prequel manga Supplementary Volume Kamen Rider Saber: Kamen Rider Buster the Comic, Ryo met and befriended Haruka Kiritani during their childhood and attended Kagari High School (かがり高校, Kagari Kōkō) together, where the former became a teenage delinquent for three years. 20 years prior to the series, after Ryo found the Genbu Shinwa Wonder Ride Book, he and Haruka were attacked by Shimii and rescued by their Japanese classics teacher, Toshikazu Kamikawa, who chose Ryo to become his apprentice and eventually succeed him as the second Earth Swordsman. Ryo agreed to become the strongest swordsman and protect Haruka's smile. Sometime after Ryo surpassed Kamikawa, he married Haruka, who gave birth to Sora six years after Hayato's betrayal.

Utilizing the Genbu Shinwa (玄武神話; Black Turtle Legend) Wonder Ride Book in conjunction with the geokinetic Dogouken Gekido (土豪剣激土, Dogōken Gekido; Earth Master Sword Fierce Earth) Zweihänder, Ryo can transform into Kamen Rider Buster (仮面ライダーバスター, Kamen Raidā Basutā). While transformed, he gains superhuman strength. He can also use other Wonder Ride Books to assume the following forms:

- Genbu Jackun (玄武ジャッ君, Genbu Jakkun): An auxiliary form accessed from the Jackun-to-Domamenoki (ジャッ君と土豆の木, Jakkun to Domame no Ki; Jack and the Earth Bean's Tree) Wonder Ride Book that equips Ryo with the vine-like Entangle Gaunt (インタングルガント, Intanguru Ganto), which is capable of firing Domame (ドマメ; Earth Bean) projectiles that can be used to generate a massive beanstalk.
- Genbu Bremen (玄武ブレーメン, Genbu Burēmen): A Wonder Rider accessed from the Bremen no Rock Band Wonder Ride Book that grants similar capabilities as Tetsuo's Hansel Bremen form.

Ryo Ogami is portrayed by Yuki Ikushima (生島 勇輝, Ikushima Yūki).

===== Ren Akamichi =====
Ren Akamichi (緋道 連, Akamichi Ren) is a young, hot-headed ninja, and an apprentice of a ninjutsu master known as the Wind Swordsman (風の剣士, Kaze no Kenshi). He was a member of Sword of Logos' Northern Base who admired Kento and developed a rivalry with Touma. Despite his skill as a swordsman, Ren's irresponsibility and tendency for troublemaking often gets the better of him. After his faith in the idea of true strength and Kento are shattered, Ren leaves the organization to find himself, fighting his former allies and traveling with the rogue Megid Desast. While helping the Sword of Logos stop Isaac, later Storious, Ren eventually takes Touma's words of what true strength is to heart and defeats Desast in battle, keeping the Megid's Alter Ride Book and Mumeiken Kyomu to aid in his fight until the book disappears. After saving both Wonder World and Earth from Storious, Ren continues his journey across the Earth, while keeping in touch with his allies.

Utilizing the Sarutobi Ninjaden (猿飛忍者伝; Sarutobi Ninja Legend) Wonder Ride Book in conjunction with the aerokinetic Fuusouken Hayate (風双剣翠風, Fūsōken Hayate; Wind Twin Sword Green Wind) ninjatō, which can be reconfigured into either a pair of swords or a shuriken, Ren can transform into Kamen Rider Kenzan (仮面ライダー剣斬, Kamen Raidā Kenzan). While transformed, he gains superhuman speed. He can also use other Wonder Ride Books to assume the following forms:

- Ninja Butasan (忍者ぶた3): An auxiliary form accessed from the Kobuta 3 Kyoudai (こぶた3兄弟, Kobuta San Kyōdai; Three Piglet Brothers) Wonder Ride Book that grants self-duplication capabilities and the use of the 3 Little Pig Brothers (こぶたの3兄弟, Kobuta no San Kyōdai) familiar for combat assistance. In this form, Ren is equipped with the left forearm-mounted Steppig Wise (ステッピッグワイズ, Suteppiggu Waizu) shield, which is capable of enlarging itself to the size of a house.
- Ninja Jackun (忍者ジャッ君, Ninja Jakkun): A Wonder Rider accessed from the Jackun-to-Domamenoki Wonder Ride Book that grants similar capabilities as Ryo's Genbu Jackun form.

Ren Akamichi is portrayed by Eiji Togashi (富樫 慧士, Togashi Eiji).

===== Tetsuo Daishinji =====
Tetsuo Daishinji (大秦寺 哲雄, Daishinji Tetsuo) is the blunt yet bashful blacksmith for the Sword of Logos' Northern Base known as the Sound Swordsman (音の剣士, Oto no Kenshi) who maintains the Seiken and Wonder Ride Books and has an enhanced sense of hearing. He later builds a friendship with Touma. After saving Wonder World and Earth, Tetsuo returns to his blacksmith duties full-time.

Utilizing the Hanselnuts to Gretel (ヘンゼルナッツとグレーテル, Henzerunattsu to Gurēteru; Hanselnuts and Gretel) Wonder Ride Book in conjunction with the sonokinetic Onjuuken Suzune (音銃剣錫音, Onjūken Suzune; Sound Gun Sword Tin Sound) pistol sword, Tetsuo can transform into Kamen Rider Slash (仮面ライダースラッシュ, Kamen Raidā Surasshu). While transformed, he gains superhuman athleticism. He can also use other Wonder Ride Books to assume the following forms:

- Hansel Bremen (ヘンゼルブレーメン, Henzeru Burēmen): An auxiliary form accessed from the Bremen no Rock Band (ブレーメンのロックバンド, Burēmen no Rokku Bando; Rock Band of Bremen) Wonder Ride Book that grants the use of healing spells. In this form, Tetsuo is equipped with the Gig Arm (ギグアーム, Gigu Āmu) gauntlet, which is capable of playing rock music that increases his fighting spirit. He also displays an energetic and cheerful attitude that contrasts with his usually timid behavior.
- Hansel Butasan (ヘンゼルぶた3, Henzeru Butasan): A Wonder Rider accessed from the Kobuta 3 Kyoudai Wonder Ride Book that grants similar capabilities as Ren's Ninja Butasan form.

Tetsuo Daishinji is portrayed by Hiroaki Oka (岡 宏明, Oka Hiroaki). As a child, Tetsuo is portrayed by Eita Fukushima (福島 永大, Fukushima Eita).

==== Southern Base ====
The Southern Base (サウザンベース, Sauzan Bēsu) is the main branch of the Sword of Logos.

===== Isaac =====
Isaac (イザク, Izaku) is the nihilistic and psychopathic leader of the Sword of Logos and the last known bearer of the Master Logos title who seeks to claim the Almighty Book for himself and reshape the world in his twisted image, an act which the organization considers forbidden. He originally hailed from a clan consisting of the original Master Logos' descendants who had their lives extended and youth maintained across multiple generations to protect humanity and the Book of Ancients alongside Tassel since time immemorial. However, Isaac slowly grew disillusioned towards humanity and angry at his predecessors for not using the Greater Book's power. With help from the Megid, Storious, they manipulate their respective factions from the shadows to further their plans until the former eventually makes himself and his true intentions known by setting out to claim his swordsmen's Seiken to perform a ritual that will grant him god-like power. In spite of the Northern Base swordsmen interrupting the ritual, Isaac succeeds in manifesting his ancestor's half of the Tome of Omniscience as the Omni Force (オムニフォース, Omuni Fōsu) Wonder Ride Book as he discards his title as Master Logos and declares war on humanity. While seeking to refine his power further, Isaac battles the swordsmen and the Shindais several times until Touma acquires the Haouken Xross Saber and overpowers him. Afterwards, Storious betrays and kills Isaac to steal the latter's Rider powers for his own plans.

The Omni Force Wonder Ride Book grants its user omnikinesis, access to the powers of several Wonder and Alter Ride Books, and the ability to summon a golden version of the King Excalibur called the Caladbolg (カラドボルグ, Karadoborugu). Additionally, Isaac can use Omni Force in conjunction with the Dooms Driver Buckle (ドゥームズドライバーバックル, Dūmuzu Doraibā Bakkuru) belt to transform into Kamen Rider Solomon (仮面ライダーソロモン, Kamen Raidā Soromon). During combat, he is capable of summoning multiple giant Caladbolgs that can transform into the King of Solomon (キングオブソロモン, Kingu Obu Soromon) mecha as reinforcements. He later acquires the ability to telepathically manipulate the Seiken and control their users like puppets, barring the Haouken Xross Saber and Touma.

Isaac is portrayed by Keisuke Sohma (相馬 圭祐, Sōma Keisuke).

===== Reika Shindai =====
Reika Shindai (神代 玲花, Shindai Reika) is the Southern Base's messenger, an assassin-class fencer known as the Smoke Swordswoman (煙の剣士, Kemuri no Kenshi), and the younger sister of Ryoga. She arrives at the Northern Base to observe Touma's increasing power as Saber and ask him to join the Southern Base. After he refuses however, Reika secretly kidnaps Sophia and frames the novelist for it, temporarily turning the Northern Base's swordsmen against him. As the swordsmen slowly realize the truth, Reika receives new orders from her leader, Isaac, to steal their Rider equipment and eliminate them. However, Reika's loyalty to him begins to waver when she learns her superior has been secretly conspiring with the Megids. Upon learning of Isaac's true plans, she and Ryoga aid the Northern Base in stopping him, and later Storious. Initially cold and methodical, she slowly warms up to the other swordsmen over the course of the series, but sometimes gets overzealous when anyone gets close to her brother.

Utilizing the Konchuu Daihyakka (昆虫大百科, Konchū Daihyakka; Great Encyclopedia of Insects) Wonder Ride Book in conjunction with the typhokinetic Eneiken Noroshi (煙叡剣狼煙, En'eiken Noroshi; Smoke Imperial Sword Smoke Signal) rapier, Reika can transform into Kamen Rider Sabela (仮面ライダーサーベラ, Kamen Raidā Sābera). While transformed, she gains the use of insect-based abilities and constructs.

Reika Shindai is portrayed by Mei Angela (アンジェラ 芽衣, Anjera Mei). As a child, Reika is portrayed by Allen Mary Claire (アレン 明亜莉 クレア, Aren Meari Kurea).

===== Ryoga Shindai =====
Ryoga Shindai (神代 凌牙, Shindai Ryōga) is a paladin and Reika's older brother known as the Time Swordsman (時の剣士, Toki no Kenshi). As the right hand of whoever holds the "Master Logos" title, the stoic and prideful Ryoga initially serves the current holder, Isaac, despite seeing him as unworthy of the title. Upon discovering his superior had been planning to bring chaos to the world behind his and Reika's backs, the disillusioned Shindais aid the Northern Base in stopping him. Following the Sword of Logos' final battle with the Megid Storious, Ryoga is elected to become part of the organization's new ruling council.

Utilizing the Ocean History (オーシャンヒストリー, Ōshan Hisutorī) Wonder Ride Book in conjunction with the chronokinetic Jikokuken Kaiji (時国剣界時; Time Region Sword World Time) sword, which can be reconfigured into a trident, Ryoga can transform into Kamen Rider Durendal (仮面ライダーデュランダル, Kamen Raidā Dyurandaru). While transformed, he gains teleportation capabilities.

Ryoga Shindai is portrayed by Ken Shonozaki (庄野崎 謙, Shōnozaki Ken).

=== Megids ===
The Megids (メギド, Megido) are monsters who tried to steal the Almighty Book two millennia ago before they were thwarted and renew their efforts in the present day. They also seek to recreate the world with the Alter Book (アルターブック, Arutā Bukku), which can be used instead of the Greater Book, have the ability to assume their human forms, and summon Shimii (シミー, Shimī) foot soldiers to aid them in battle.

The three commander Megids were originally the first humans to visit Wonder World millennia prior and friends of Tassel, the original Master Logos, and a priestess who connected Wonder World to Earth before they betrayed their friends and assumed their monstrous forms after stealing fragments of the Tome of Omniscience. Upon their deaths, their human souls are released, purified, and return to Wonder World to reunite with Tassel, grateful to Touma for saving them.

==== Storious ====
Storious (ストリウス, Sutoriusu) (Note: Alternatively, the show's official website at TV Asahi and several merchandise have "Storious" spelt as "Strius".) is a dark and reserved Megid who controls the genre of stories and values knowledge above all else. 2,000 years prior, he was originally a poet who found enjoyment in creating new stories. While accompanying the original Master Logos and Victor to find the Almighty Book for humanity's benefit however, Storious fell into despair after the Tome of Omniscience revealed every work he had and would make in his lifetime. Believing humanity is incapable of creating original thoughts and embracing the idea that all things are at their most beautiful when they are ending, he manipulates Legeiel and Zooous into becoming monsters alongside him and help him steal pages from the Almighty Book so he can end all existence. Retaining his original personality following his transformation, Storious spends the next two millennia manipulating his comrades and Isaac into facilitating his goal. After claiming his fallen Megid pawns' Alter Ride Books for the Tome of Omniscience fragments they contained and creating Charybdis to further his plot, Storious kills Isaac and Tassel to claim the Tome of Omniscience. He then creates Another Sophia and has Charybdis consume her, numerous humans trapped in Ride Books, the Tome of Omniscience's fragments, and himself before emerging from Charybdis, destroying the Megid in the process. Using the newly created Grimoire (グリモワール, Gurimowāru) Wonder Ride Book, Storious attempts to destroy both Wonder World and Earth, but is defeated by Touma, Rintaro, and Kento via the power of the Wonder Almighty Wonder Ride Book. As he dies, Storious regrets his actions and rediscovers the meaning of joy.

In his Megid form, Storious has ergokinesis, teleportation capabilities, self-duplication capabilities, the ability to fire eye-based lightning blasts, siphon energy, and seal the SworDrivers, and wields the two-pronged Bilgamed (ビルガメード, Birugamēdo) longsword. After gaining the Grimoire Wonder Ride Book, Storious gains necromancy, which he uses to revive the Four Sages as his undead minions, the Lords of Wise. He can also use Grimoire in conjunction with the Dooms Driver Buckle to become Kamen Rider Storious (仮面ライダーストリウス, Kamen Raidā Sutoriusu).

Storious is portrayed by Robin Furuya (古屋 呂敏, Furuya Robin).

==== Legeiel ====
Legeiel (レジエル, Rejieru) is a calm, manipulative Megid who controls the genre of mythical creatures and was originally a humble and friendly individual. Unlike his peers, he does not want to be actively involved, only lending his help when necessary. However, his pride often gets the better of him, especially when things do not go his way. After being defeated by Saber with the Primitive Dragon Wonder Ride Book, a frustrated and desperate Legeiel enhances his personal Alter Ride Book to evolve into Legeiel Forbidden (レジエル・フォビドゥン, Rejieru Fobidun) and seek revenge despite the fatal side effects of his transformation. However, Touma as Saber Elemental Primitive Dragon destroys Legeiel in an act of mercy.

In battle, Legeiel has enhanced jumping capabilities, various elemental powers, the ability to reflect attacks, and wields the double-bladed Bolhessed (ボルヘスド, Boruhesudo) sword. As Legeiel Forbidden, he can combine his elemental powers and produce explosions.

Legeiel is portrayed by Kyle Takano (高野 海琉, Takano Kairu).

==== Zooous ====
Zooous (ズオス, Zuosu) is a cruel, hot-headed Megid who controls the genre of animals and was originally a calm and cheerful individual. In spite of his brutish personality, he prefers to fight worthy opponents, sparing those he considers weak or unmotivated to provoke and humiliate them into becoming stronger or more aggressive should they re-encounter each other in battle. 15 years prior, while taking part in the Megids' invasion, he murdered Sword of Logos member, Kenshin Nagamine. As a result, Zooous developed a rivalry with the swordsman's student and successor, Rintaro. After evolving into Zooous Predator (ズオス・プレデター, Zuoso Puredetā) while fighting Rintaro and Touma, the Megid faces the former while attacking the Northern Base and is destroyed by Rintaro as Blades Tategami Hyoujuu Senki.

In battle, Zooous is the strongest of the Megid commanders, can adapt to any combat situation, produce fireballs, and teleport, and wields the khopesh-esque Jidora (ジドラ) and Gunu (グウヌ, Gūnu) swords. As Zooous Predator, he has access to a feral, berserker rage.

Zooous is portrayed by Koji Saikawa (才川 コージ, Saikawa Kōji).

==== Charybdis ====
Charybdis, also known as the Charybdis Megid (カリュブディスメギド, Karyubudisu Megido), is a namesake-themed hybrid Megid that Storious created for his agenda to recreate the Tome of Omniscience. Charybdis came into being when Storious combines the Gansekiou Golem, Hanzaki Sanshouou, and Mienikui Ahirunoko Alter Ride Books into Charybdis' eponymous Alter Ride Book and using competitive eater Mami Imoto (伊本 マミ, Imoto Mami) as his host. While Charybdis is separated from Mami and destroyed by Kamen Rider Saikou, Storious transfers the Alter Ride Book to Mami's twin sister Remi Imoto (伊本 レミ, Imoto Remi), with the reconstituted Charybdis devouring Mami to increase his power with both twins inside him. Though Kamen Riders Saber and Saikou destroy Charybdis once more after extracting the sisters, Charybdis later reconstitutes without a host body and becomes Storious' enforcer.

After partially devouring Desast and the Eternal Phoenix Wonder Ride Book to evolve into Charybdis Hercules (カリュブディス・ハーキュリー, Karyubudisu Hākyurī), Charybdis enacts his role in Storious' plan by consuming him, Another Sophia, Legeiel and Zooous' Alter Ride Books, and numerous humans who were trapped in Ride Books before Storious destroys him from the inside out.

In battle, Charybdis wields the Zarutsdra (ザルツドラ, Zarutsudora) hatchet and possesses his component Megids' powers, along with the added ability to consume anything and absorbing the powers of whatever he devours. As Charybdis Hercules, he gains the ability to generate seismic tremors and access to Desast and Kamen Rider Falchion's powers.

Charybdis is voiced by Ryota Iwasaki (岩崎 諒太, Iwasaki Ryōta) while Mami and Remi Imoto are portrayed by Mio and Yae respectively.

==== Megid Combatants ====
Megid Combatants are created by the three commander Megids from Alter Ride Books (アルターライドブック, Arutā Raido Bukku), which allow them to reappear and regenerate so long as it is not damaged or destroyed. The commanders later use an ancient ability to turn humans who can see Wonder World into Megids, though if their Alter Ride Books are destroyed before the transformation becomes permanent, they will be separated from their host.

- Golem Megid (ゴーレムメギド, Gōremu Megido): A namesake-themed monster that Legeiel created from the Gansekiou Golem (岩石王ゴーレム, Gansekiō Gōremu; Rock King Golem) Alter Ride Book. It is destroyed by Kamen Rider Saber. The Golem Megid is voiced by Hiroshi Shirokuma (白熊 寛嗣, Shirokuma Hiroshi).
- Ari Megids (アリメギド, Ari Megido): A horde of ant-themed monsters that Storious created from the Ari ka Kirigirisu (アリかキリギリス; Ant or Grasshopper) Alter Ride Book. The queen is destroyed by Kamen Rider Blades. The Ari Megids are voiced by Akinori Egoshi (江越 彬紀, Egoshi Akinori).
- Kirigirisu Megid (キリギリスメギド, Kirigirisu Megido): A katydid-themed monster that Storious also created from the Ari ka Kirigirisu Alter Ride Book. It is destroyed by Kamen Rider Saber. The Kirigirisu Megid is also voiced by Akinori Egoshi.
- Hanzaki Megid (ハンザキメギド, Hanzaki Megido): (Note: According to the show's official website at TV Asahi, this Megid is also called the Sanshouuo Megid (サンショウウオメギド, Sanshōuo Megido).) A giant salamander-themed monster that Zooous created from the Hanzaki Sanshouou (ハンザキサンショウ王, Hanzaki Sanshōō; Hanzaki Salamander King) Alter Ride Book. After evolving into its enhanced form, it is destroyed by Kamen Rider Saber. The Hanzaki Megid is voiced by Junji Majima (間島 淳司, Majima Junji).
- Piranha Megids (ピラニアメギド, Pirania Megido): Four namesake-themed monsters that Zooous created from the Piranha no Lunch (ピラニアのランチ, Pirania no Ranchi; Piranha's Lunch) Alter Ride Book. The first and third Piranha Megids are destroyed by Kamen Rider Saber while the second and fourth are destroyed by Kamen Rider Espada. The Piranha Megids are voiced by Daisuke Hirakawa (平川 大輔, Hirakawa Daisuke) and Arisa Morishima (森島 亜梨紗, Morishima Arisa).
- Medusa Megids (メデューサメギド, Medyūsa Megido): A trio of namesake/gorgon-themed monsters that Legeiel created from the Medusa Jaden (メデューサ蛇伝, Medyūsa Jaden; Medusa Snake Legend) Alter Ride Book. The first Medusa Megid is destroyed by Kamen Rider Blades while the second and third are destroyed by Kamen Rider Saber. The Medusa Megids are voiced by Kimiko Saitō (斉藤 貴美子, Saitō Kimiko).
- Ahiru Megids (アヒルメギド, Ahiru Megido): Six duck-themed monsters that Storious created from the Mienikui Ahirunoko (見えにくいアヒルの子, Mienikui Ahiru no Ko; Invisible Duckling) Alter Ride Book. Five of the six Ahiru Megids are destroyed by Kamen Riders Saber, Blades, Espada, and Slash. After evolving into the swan-like Hakucho Megid (ハクチョウメギド, Hakuchō Megido), the last one is destroyed by Kamen Rider Slash. The Ahiru Megids are voiced by Tomokazu Seki (関 智一, Seki Tomokazu).
- Goblin Megids (ゴブリンメギド, Goburin Megido): Seven namesake-themed monsters that Legeiel created from the Itazura Goblins (いたずらゴブリンズ, Itazura Goburinzu; Mischievous Goblins) Alter Ride Book. They are destroyed by Kamen Riders Saber, Blades, Buster, Kenzan, Slash, and Calibur.
- Yeti Megid (イエティメギド, Ieti Megido): A namesake-themed monster that Legeiel created from the Shirayuki Yeti (白雪イエティ, Shirayuki Ieti; Snow White Yeti) Alter Ride Book and Yuki Shirai (白井 ゆき, Shirai Yuki), Mei's editor-in-chief. It is separated from Yuki and destroyed by Kamen Riders Saber and Saikou. The Yeti Megid is voiced by Wataru Hatano (羽多野 渉, Hatano Wataru) while Yuki Shirai is portrayed by Hitomi Hasebe (長谷部 瞳, Hasebe Hitomi).
- Ousama Megid (王様メギド, Ōsama Megido): A king-themed monster that Storious created from the Hadashi no Ousama (はだしの王様, Hadashi no Ōsama; Barefoot King) Alter Ride Book and Shingo Kijima (来島 慎吾, Kijima Shingo). It is separated from Shingo by Kamen Rider Saikou and destroyed by Kamen Rider Saber. The Ousama Megid is voiced by Kenichi Ogata (緒方 賢一, Ogata Ken'ichi) while Shingo Kijima is portrayed by Kaito Komie (込江 海翔, Komie Kaito).
- Neko Megid (ネコメギド, Neko Megido): A cat-themed monster that Zooous created from the Neko ni Accessory (猫にアクセサリー, Neko ni Akusesarī; Accessories For Cats) Alter Ride Book and Mei to help him torment Rintaro. It is separated from Mei by Kamen Rider Blades and destroyed by him and Kamen Rider Saber. The Neko Megid is voiced by Romi Park (朴 璐美, Paku Romi).

===== Other Megid Combatants =====
- Spider Megid (スパイダーメギド, Supaidā Megido): A namesake-themed monster that Zooous created from the Getting Spider (ゲッティングスパイダー, Gettingu Supaidā) Alter Ride Book. It is destroyed by Kamen Rider Buster. This Megid appears exclusively in the tie-in prequel manga Supplementary Volume Kamen Rider Saber: Kamen Rider Buster the Comic.
- Sentai Megid (戦隊メギド, Sentai Megido): An atypical Zenkaizer/Super Sentai-themed Megid that Asmodeus created to serve him. It is destroyed by Akarenger and Twokaizer. This Megid appears exclusively in the crossover film Saber + Zenkaiger: Super Hero Senki and is voiced by Isao Sasaki (ささき いさお, Sasaki Isao).
- Amanojaku Megid (天邪鬼メギド, Amanojaku Megido): A namesake-themed Megid created from its Alter Ride Book, which allows the user to merge with the Megid, and Rui Mitarai. Rui in his Megid form is defeated by Kamen Riders Sabela and Durendal. This Megid appears exclusively in the web special Kamen Rider Saber Spin-off: Kamen Rider Sabela & Durendal.

=== Kamen Rider Falchion ===
Kamen Rider Falchion (仮面ライダーファルシオン, Kamen Raidā Farushion) is a moniker used by those who become the Void Swordsman (無の剣士, Mu no Kenshi), also known as the Immortal Swordsman (不死身の剣士, Fujimi no Kenshi).

Anyone who becomes Falchion utilizes the Eternal Phoenix (エターナルフェニックス, Etānaru Fenikkusu) Wonder Ride Book in conjunction with the scabbard-like Haken BlaDriver (覇剣ブレードライバー, Haken Burēdoraibā; Supreme Sword BlaDriver) belt and the nihilikinetic Mumeiken Kyomu (無銘剣虚無; Unmarked Sword Void) knightly sword in order to transform. While transformed, they gain the use of the God Beast Eternal Phoenix (神獣エターナルフェニックス, Shinjū Etānaru Fenikkusu) familiar for combat assistance.

During the events of the V-Cinema Kamen Rider Saber: Trio of Deep Sin, Mamiya, Yuina Tachibana, and Shinjiro Shinozaki acquire Falchion's powers and utilize the Amazing Siren (アメイジングセイレーン, Ameijingu Seirēn) Wonder Ride Book, which allows the user to read and alter people's pasts, in place of Eternal Phoenix to transform.

==== Bahato ====
Bahato (バハト) is the first Void Swordsman and a former ally of Yuri's from millennia prior who first appears in the film Kamen Rider Saber Theatrical Short Story: The Phoenix Swordsman and the Book of Ruin. Bahato was a Sword of Logos member until his family was slain by someone he considered a close friend before they became obsessed with power. After avenging his family, a deranged Bahato deemed humanity irredeemable and attempted to erase the world using the Book of Ruin (破滅の本, Hametsu no Hon), only for Yuri to seal him in it. During the events of the film, Bahato is released and attempts to reenact his plan before Touma re-seals him. Late into the series, Isaac comes into possession of the Book of Ruin and frees Bahato to aid in his plan in obtaining godhood and destroying humanity. After Touma kills Bahato, Desast takes the latter's sword while his soul returns to Wonder World, his faith in humanity restored.

Bahato is portrayed by Masashi Taniguchi (谷口 賢志, Taniguchi Masashi).

==== Desast ====
Desast (デザスト, Dezasuto) is a Fenrir/Japanese tiger beetle/"The Singing Bone"-themed rogue, hybrid Megid who Storius created on a whim with no purpose in mind, which Desast compensates by fighting ideal opponents. 15 years prior, Desast took part in the Megids' invasion and killed several of the Sword of Logos' swordsmen before he was sealed in his eponymous Alter Ride Book. In the present, Daichi releases Desast so the latter can rejoin the Megids' fight against the Sword of Logos. However, Desast chooses to act independently instead. Desast takes an interest in Ren due to their similar mindsets, accompanying the ninja after he leaves the Sword of Logos. Following Bahato's demise at Touma's hands, Desast stealthily takes the former's sword and becomes the new Falchion to battle Storious, only for Charybdis to damage his Alter Ride Book. Slowly dying as a result, he forces Ren to face him in battle and give him an honorable death.

In battle, Desast has teleportation capabilities, the ability to hide in shadows, and wields the bone-like Grudge Dent (グラッジデント, Gurajji Dento) sword, with which he can perform the Calamity Strike (カラミティ・ストライク, Karamiti Sutoraiku) finisher and wield as Falchion alongside the Mumeiken Kyomu.

After becoming Falchion, he also became immortal and makes use of the Eternal Phoenix Wonder Ride Book in an attempt to negate his damaged Alter Ride Book's effects, though the former contributes to the latter's damage in the process and slowly kills him.

During the events of the crossover web series Kamen Rider Outsiders, Desast is revived by Foundation X and acquires the Gaikotsu Ninjaden (骸骨忍者伝; Skeleton Ninja Legend) Wonder Ride Book, a SworDriver, and the Kokuranken Shikkoku (黒嵐剣漆黒; Black Storm Sword Jet Black) sword, which allow him to transform into Kamen Rider Desast (仮面ライダーデザスト, Kamen Raidā Dezasuto).

Desast is voiced by Kōki Uchiyama (内山 昂輝, Uchiyama Kōki).

=== Yuri ===
Yuri (ユーリ, Yūri) is an ancient swordsman known as the Light Swordsman (光の剣士, Hikari no Kenshi) who once wielded the Ankokuken Kurayami and the photokinetic Kougouken Saikou (光剛剣最光, Kōgōken Saikō; Light Mighty Sword Ultimate Light) short sword millennia ago. After his friend Bahato went mad, Yuri was forced to seal him in the Book of Ruin before merging himself with the Kougouken Saikou and sealing himself in turn with the King of Arthur Wonder Ride Book in Avalon. After Touma reaches Avalon and claims King of Arthur in the present, Yuri is freed, gains the ability to project an illusion of his human form, and bears witness to Touma's struggles following Kento's apparent death at Daichi's hands from afar. After Touma defeats Daichi, Yuri approaches the former to warn him of a traitor within the Sword of Logos' Southern Base before helping the novelist clear his name, convincing the Northern Base's swordsmen of the truth, and joining them in stopping the present-day Master Logos, Isaac, and later the Megid Storious. Following Storious' defeat, Yuri is elected to become part of the Sword of Logos' new ruling council.

Utilizing the Kin no Buki Gin no Buki (金の武器 銀の武器; The Golden Weapon and the Silver Weapon) Wonder Ride Book in conjunction with the Seiken Saikou Driver (聖剣サイコウドライバー, Seiken Saikō Doraibā; Holy Sword Saikou Driver) belt, Yuri can transform back into the Kougouken Saikou and become known as Kamen Rider Saikou (仮面ライダー最光, Kamen Raidā Saikō) in the present. While transformed, he is capable of fighting through telekinetic movements on his own, though he can be wielded by either a living silhouette called Saikou Shadow (最光シャドー, Saikō Shadō) or another swordsman. Additionally, the Kougouken Saikou is connected to the Ankokuken Kurayami, which allows him to summon the latter and combine both swords' power to create a black hole-like portal and teleport his opponent to another location.

After creating the X-Swordman (エックスソードマン, Ekkusu Sōdoman) (Note: While the show's official website at TV Asahi and several merchandise have "X-Swordman" spelt as "X Sword Man", the corresponding Wonder Ride Book lacks the space.) Wonder Ride Book, Yuri can use it to assume his eponymous final form. In this form, he becomes Saikou Shadow's armor to take over its body and utilize his full physical combat prowess. He can also change the X-Swordman Wonder Ride Book's setting to assume one of the following forms:

- X-Swordman Powerful (エックスソードマンパワフル, Ekkusu Sōdoman Pawafuru): A variant of Yuri's X-Swordman form accessed from the X-Swordman Wonder Ride Book's Powerful Page (パワフルページ, Pawafuru Pēji) mode that transforms him into Saikou Shadow's left arm to increase its punching capabilities.
- X-Swordman Wonderful (エックスソードマンワンダフル, Ekkusu Sōdoman Wandafuru): A variant of Yuri's X-Swordman form accessed from the X-Swordman Wonder Ride Book's Wonderful Page (ワンダフルページ, Wandafuru Pēji) mode that transforms him into Saikou Shadow's right leg to increase its kicking capabilities.

Yuri is portrayed by Tomohiro Ichikawa (市川 知宏, Ichikawa Tomohiro).

== Guest characters ==
- Kenshin Nagamine (長嶺 謙信, Nagamine Kenshin): Rintaro's teacher and predecessor as the Water Swordsman before he was killed by Zooous 15 years prior. Kenshin Nagamine is portrayed by Masashi Mikami (三上 真史, Mikami Masashi).
- Unnamed priestess: A woman who Isaac based Sophia on and served as a bridge between the then-newly created Wonder World and Earth in the distant past via the Almighty Book's power. After choosing Tassel to become Wonder World's first guardian and Storious betrayed her, she sacrificed herself while turning the Almighty Book's pages into the Wonder Ride Books, scattering them across Earth, and bestowing the remaining fragments to Tassel and the original Master Logos. The unnamed priestess is portrayed by Rina Chinen.
- Original Master Logos (初代マスターロゴス, Shodai Masutā Rogosu): Isaac's noble and kind ancestor who founded the Sword of Logos. He originally sought the Almighty Book's power to help humanity, but became one of its protectors following Storious' betrayal. The original Master Logos is portrayed by Keisuke Sohma.
- Another Sophia: A clone of Sophia that Storious creates to serve as a sacrifice in his ritual to restore the Tome of Omniscience. Another Sophia is portrayed by Rina Chinen.
- Haruka Ogami (née Kiritani) (尾上 (桐谷) 晴香, Ogami (Kiritani) Haruka): Ryo's childhood friend turned wife, Sora's mother, and an employee at a foreign-affiliated company who first appears in the tie-in prequel manga Supplementary Volume Kamen Rider Saber: Kamen Rider Buster the Comic. While attending Kagari High School together, Haruka became student council president and captain of the women's volleyball team in her senior year. Six years after Haruka graduated from university and married Ryo, she gave birth to Sora. Haruka Ogami is portrayed by Arisa Nakajima (中島 亜梨沙, Nakajima Arisa).
- The Lords of Wise (ロード・オブ・ワイズ, Rōdo Obu Waizu): Storious' undead minions who were previously the Sword of Logos' Four Sages, members of the order's leadership who developed their swordsmen's fighting styles. After the present day Master Logos, Isaac, secretly murders them, they are resurrected by Storious to serve as his enforcers before they are destroyed by the Sword of Logos' swordsmen.
  - Spartan (スパルタン, Suparutan): The wielder of the Megas Machete (メガスマチェーテ, Megasu Machēte) great sword and the Dinami Axe (ズィナミアックス, Zwinami Akkusu). He is destroyed by Kamen Rider Kenzan via Desast and Kamen Rider Falchion's powers.
  - Highlander (ハイランダー, Hairandā): The wielder of the Providence Scythe (プロビデンスサイズ, Purobidensu Saizu). He is destroyed by Kamen Rider Slash.
  - Diago (ディアゴ): The wielder of the twin Bis Viento (ビスビエント, Bisu Biento) rapiers. He is destroyed by Kamen Rider Sabela.
  - Kuon (クオン): The wielder of the twin In (陰) and Yō (陽) swords. He is destroyed by Kamen Riders Kenzan and Espada.
- Orihime World (オリヒメワルド, Orihime Warudo): A weaver-girl-themed monster from a parallel world and the counterpart of Hikoboshi World. After mysteriously ending up in the Sword of Logos' world, he is destroyed by Twokaizer and Kamen Rider Saber. Orihime World is voiced by Sōichirō Hoshi.
- Zocks Goldtsuiker (ゾックス・ゴールドツイカー, Zokkusu Gōrudotsuikā): A World Pirate (世界海賊, Sekai Kaizoku) from the parallel world of Kaizokutopia (海賊トピア) who travels the multiverse in the hybrid battleship/crocodile-themed CrocoDaiOh (クロコダイオー, Kurokodaiō) mecha with his family and can transform into Twokaizer (ツーカイザー, Tsūkaizā). He pursues Orihime World to the Sword of Logos' world and gains their help in destroying the monster before returning to the Zenkaigers' world. Zocks Goldtsuiker is portrayed by Atsuki Mashiko (増子 敦貴, Mashiko Atsuki), who reprises his role from Kikai Sentai Zenkaiger.
- Batta Deadman (バッタ・デッドマン, Batta Deddoman): A grasshopper-themed Deadman born from Junpei (純平), a lonely fan of Touma Kamiyama, and the Batta Proto Vistamp. It acts on Junpei's resentment towards his successful friends for abandoning him until it is destroyed by Kamen Riders Saber and Espada while a reformed Junpei willingly gives the Batta Vistamp to Fenix and accepts his friends' decisions to move on. Junpei is portrayed by Yuito Kamata (蒲田 優惟人, Kamata Yuito).
- Ikki Igarashi (五十嵐 一輝, Igarashi Ikki) and Vice (バイス, Baisu): A young man and his inner demon who are capable of transforming into Kamen Rider Revi (仮面ライダーリバイ, Kamen Raidā Ribai) and Kamen Rider Vice (仮面ライダーバイス, Kamen Raidā Baisu) respectively. They and their ally George Karizaki pursue the Batta Deadman and retrieve its Vistamp after Kamen Riders Saber and Espada destroy it. Ikki Igarashi is portrayed by Kentaro Maeda (前田 拳太郎, Maeda Kentarō) while Vice is voiced by Subaru Kimura (木村 昴, Kimura Subaru), both ahead of their appearances in Kamen Rider Revice.
- George Karizaki (ジョージ・狩崎, Jōji Karizaki): An eccentric Fenix scientist and ally of Ikki and Vice's who joins them in pursuing the Batta Deadman. George Karizaki is portrayed by Noritaka Hamao (濱尾 ノリタカ, Hamao Noritaka), ahead of his appearance in Kamen Rider Revice.

== Spin-off characters ==
=== Toshikazu Kamikawa ===
Toshikazu Kamikawa (亀巳川 寿和, Kamikawa Toshikazu) was the previous Earth Swordsman and Ryo's predecessor and Japanese classics teacher at Kagari High School who worked as a swordsman on the side. Having lost his wife and realizing that he will lose his ability to wield the Dogouken Gekido due to his old age, he chose Ryo to become his successor. 20 years prior to the series, when Ryo joined the Sword of Logos as the new Earth Swordsman, Kamikawa left to live in quiet retirement before dying some time prior to the series. He appears exclusively in the tie-in prequel manga Supplementary Volume Kamen Rider Saber: Kamen Rider Buster the Comic.

=== Kyoichiro Shinsen ===
Kyoichiro Shinsen (新閃 恭一郎, Shinsen Kyōichirō) was a genius accountant, the previous Thunder Swordsman, and Kento's predecessor who was killed by Desast 15 years prior to the series. He appears exclusively in the tie-in prequel manga Supplementary Volume Kamen Rider Saber: Kamen Rider Buster the Comic and the live-action prequel special Sword of Logos Saga.

Kyoichiro Shinsen is portrayed by Kazuaki Ishii (石井 一彰, Ishii Kazuaki)

=== Amane Kagami ===
Amane Kagami (鏡 天祢, Kagami Amane) was a popular elite member of the Sword of Logos' Southern Base, the previous Wind Swordswoman, and Ren's predecessor who was killed by Desast 15 years prior to the series. She appears exclusively in the tie-in prequel manga Supplementary Volume Kamen Rider Saber: Kamen Rider Buster the Comic and the live-action prequel special Sword of Logos Saga.

Amane Kagami is portrayed by Erena Mizusawa (水沢 エレナ, Mizusawa Erena).

=== Asmodeus ===
Asmodeus (アスモデウス, Asumodeusu) is a former guard for the Sword of Logos' Agastya Base (アガスティアベース, Agasutia Bēsu) space station who was petrified and held in his former workplace for going rogue sometime prior to the events of the crossover film Saber + Zenkaiger: Super Hero Senki. After escaping in the present, he seeks to use Shotaro Ishinomori and 80 forbidden books to erase the Kamen Rider and Super Sentai franchises' existence. Asmodeus enlarges, but he is destroyed by the Kamen Riders and the Super Sentai's mecha.

In his monstrous form, Asmodeus dual wields a pair of swords and can absorb the mecha of evil organizations from both franchises to turn into his gigantic dragon form.

Asmodeus is portrayed by Ayumi Tanida (谷田 歩, Tanida Ayumi).

=== Shotaro Ishinomori ===
Shotaro Ishinomori (石ノ森 章太郎, Ishinomori Shōtarō), born Shotaro Onodera (小野寺 章太郎, Onodera Shotaro) was a manga artist, the creator of the Kamen Rider and Super Sentai franchises, and an apprentice of Osamu Tezuka. A younger version of Ishinomori appears exclusively in the crossover film Saber + Zenkaiger: Super Hero Senki.

Shotaro Ishinomori's younger self is portrayed by Fuku Suzuki (鈴木 福, Suzuki Fuku)

=== Kamen Rider Tassel ===
Kamen Rider Tassel (仮面ライダータッセル, Kamen Raidā Tasseru) is Tassel's evil counterpart and the guardian of Dark World (ダークワールド, Dāku Wārudo), which was born of human malice who seeks to take over Wonder World via the power of a dark version of the Almighty Book. He resurrects Asmodeus, the Lords of Wise, and Charybdis, who creates a copy of the Almighty Book and clones of the three commander Megids and Desast, to serve as his minions. However, he is destroyed by Kamen Rider Saber. Kamen Rider Tassel appears exclusively in the stage show Kamen Rider Saber: Final Stage.

Kamen Rider Tassel utilizes Kamen Rider Falchion's BlaDriver and Mumeiken Kyomu and the Tassel Dark (タッセルダーク, Tasseru Dāku) Wonder Ride Book in place of Eternal Phoenix to transform.

Kamen Rider Tassel is voiced by Tobi from Les Romanesques, who also portrays Tassel.

=== Mamiya ===
Mamiya (間宮) is a doctor and the adult counterpart of Riku who appears exclusively in the V-Cinema Kamen Rider Saber: Trio of Deep Sin. Eight years prior to the events of the V-Cinema, when Riku touched Kamen Rider Falchion's Mumeiken Kyomu, Mamiya was born from him. With the Amazing Siren Wonder Ride Book, he poses as Touma and Kento's childhood friend and seeks to erase the swordsmen's existence by erasing people's memories of them.

Mamiya is portrayed by Ryo Kimura (木村 了, Kimura Ryō).

=== Yuina Tachibana ===
Yuina Tachibana (立花 結菜, Tachibana Yuina) is Kento's fiancée who lost her former fiancé in a Megid attack and appears exclusively in the V-Cinema Kamen Rider Saber: Trio of Deep Sin. Eight years prior to the events of the V-Cinema, she accepted a copy of the Amazing Siren Wonder Ride Book from Mamiya.

Yuina Tachibana is portrayed by Rin Asuka (飛鳥 凛, Asuka Rin).

=== Shinjiro Shinozaki ===
Shinjiro Shinozaki (篠崎 真二郎, Shinozaki Shinjirō) is Rintaro's father who appears exclusively in the V-Cinema Kamen Rider Saber: Trio of Deep Sin. Eight years prior to the events of the V-Cinema, he sent Mamiya to create a copy of the Amazing Siren Wonder Ride Book so he can challenge Rintaro.

Shinjiro Shinozaki is Satoshi Hashimoto (橋本 さとし, Hashimoto Satoshi).

=== Riku ===
Riku (陸) is an orphan boy whom Touma cares for and appears exclusively in the V-Cinema Kamen Rider Saber: Trio of Deep Sin.

Riku portrayed by Kiara Minegishi (嶺岸 煌桜, Minegishi Kiara). A younger version of Riku is portrayed by Tōma Matsubara (松原 冬馬, Matsubara Tōma).

=== Rui Mitarai ===
Rui Mitarai (御手洗 るい, Mitarai Rui) is a member of the Mitarai clan, a famous Sword of Logos family on par with the Shindai clan, who appears exclusively in the web special Kamen Rider Saber Spin-off: Kamen Rider Sabela & Durendal. After killing the head of his clan with the power of an Alter Rider Book, he seeks to take over the Sword of Logos for peace in the world before the Shindai siblings stop him.

Rui Mitarai is portrayed by Hiroshi Yazaki (矢崎 広, Yazaki Hiroshi).
