= Toko Furuuchi =

Japanese singer and songwriter (born 1972)

Toko Furuuchi 古内 東子
- Born: Furuuchi Toko; 1 November 1972 (age 53)
- Origin: Nerima, Tokyo, Japan
- Genres: J-pop; city pop
- Occupations: Singer-songwriter; composer
- Years active: 1993–present
- Label: Sony; Pony Canyon; Avex Trax; Universal Music Japan

Toko Furuuchi (古内 東子, Furuuchi Toko; born 1 November 1972) is a Japanese singer, songwriter, and composer. Following her debut in 1993, she released several albums and singles with Sony Music Entertainment Japan, Pony Canyon, and Avex Trax, and her 1998 album Mahō no Te reached number one at the Oricon Albums Chart. She also won the Japan Record Award for Best Album at the 39th Japan Record Awards for her album Koi. Alongside her activities as a singer, she has also written lyrics and music for numerous artists, including V6, Chemistry, and Ryoko Hirosue. Her songs are centered on themes of romance, garnering particularly strong support from working Japanese women of her generation.

== Biography ==
Toko Furuuchi, a native of Nerima, was born on 1 November 1972. She studied piano as a child and became interested in Western music as a junior high student. She also studied at Atomi Gakuen Junior High and High School, as well as a high school in Connecticut and the Sophia University Faculty of Comparative Culture. She and her older sister often made demo tapes to show their parents.

In 1990/1991, Furuuchi took one of the demo tapes she made with her older sister to Sony Music Japan without the latter's knowledge. That tape reached one of the producers there, and in 1993 she made her debut with the single "Hayaku Isoide". Her 1996 single "Dareyori Sukinanoni" became her highest-single one, and her 1997 album Koi won the Japan Record Award for Best Album at the 39th Japan Record Awards. Her 1998 album, Mahō no Te, reached number one at the Oricon Albums Chart.

Furuuchi left Sony Music Japan for Pony Canyon, releasing a few albums with them, including Futsuu no Koto and Cashmere Music (both 2004). In the mid-2000s, she shifted towards acoustic concerts with only her piano-playing and a bass guitar. In October 2008, she released In Love Again, her first album with Avex. In January 2009, she made her first concert performance at Joe's Pub in New York City, becoming a regular act there. In April 2022, she released Taion, Kodō, her first Sony Music Japan album in a long time. In October 2022, her Toko Furuuchi 30th Anniversary Special Live concert was held at Tokyo International Forum Hall C, featuring both 1990s hits and rarely-shown songs. One of her songs, "Itsuka Kitto", appeared in the 2024 city pop compilation City Pop Groovy '90s: Girls & Boys.

Furuuchi is also a songwriter and composer, with more than a hundred songs to her credit. While most of her songwriting and composition credits are her own songs, she has written several songs for other artists, including Nanase Aikawa, Kumiko Aizawa, Alan Dawa Dolma, Yui Aragaki, Chemistry, Ryōko Hirosue, Junichi Inagaki, Junko Ishihara, Kasarinchu, Nao Matsushita, Mihimaru GT, Ms.Ooja, Yurika Ohyama, Tomu Ranju, Hitomi Shimatani, Skoop On Somebody, Sowelu, Masayuki Suzuki, Satomi Takasugi, Tiara, Rie Tomosaka, Yuuka Ueno, Aya Ueto, and V6. In a 2026 interview with Asahi Shimbun, she recalled that at the time she debuted she decided that she would quit songwriting if it "starts to feel like a chore and stops being fun".

== Artistry ==
Furuuchi is very popular with women and is considered a leading figure in the music scene for single office ladies. She has few songs from a male perspective, such as "Aitai kara", "10%", "Boku no Uchuu", "Egao", and Chemistry's "Aikagi". According to Aera, Furuuchi "delicately portrays and effortlessly sings about the bittersweet moments and joys women experience". Hitoshi Kurimoto noted that heartbreak was a major theme throughout her songs. In an interview, Furuuchi stated that as a songwriter she writes about only her own feelings, and that her songwriting process involves having herself starting as the protagonist before expanding that role to "everyone".

Composer and music critic Haruo Chikada said that Furuuchi's appeal lies in her voice, and remarked that "her voice is well controlled as an instrument. This applies to pitch, dynamics, and timing. Every vowel and consonant is carefully tuned to make the sound as good as possible." Her inspirations include Earth, Wind & Fire, Hall & Oates, and Steely Dan.

== Personal life ==
Furuuchi announced her marriage to a non-celebrity man in October 2012, and in December 2014 revealed on her blog that they had a son.

== Discography ==
=== Albums ===
==== Studio albums ====
Title	Album details	Peak chart positions					
Title	Album details	JPN	JPN Comb.	JPN Dg.	JPN Hot	JPN Sales	JPN DL
Slow Down (stylized in all-caps)	Released: 21 April 1993; Label: Sony Music Entertainment Japan	—	—	—	—	—	—
Distance	Released: 21 November 1993; Label: Sony Music Entertainment Japan	—	—	—	—	—	—
Hug	Released: 21 September 1994; Label: Sony Music Entertainment Japan	46	—	—	—	—	—
Strength	Released: 21 September 1995; Label: Sony Music Entertainment Japan	17	—	—	—	—	—
Hourglass	Released: 21 June 1996; Label: Sony Music Entertainment Japan	10	—	—	—	—	—
Koi (恋)	Released: 21 August 1997; Label: Sony Music Entertainment Japan	2	—	—	—	—	—
Mahō no Te (魔法の手)	Released: 19 August 1998; Label: Sony Music Entertainment Japan	1	—	—	86	58	—
Winter Star (stylized in small-caps)	Released: 1 December 1999; Label: Sony Music Entertainment Japan	8	—	—	—	—	—
Dark Ocean (stylized as Dark ocean)	Released: 6 December 2000; Label: Sony Music Entertainment Japan	24	—	—	—	—	—
10 Stories (stylized as 10stories)	Released: 4 September 2002; Label: Pony Canyon	37	—	—	—	—	—
Futsuu no Koto (フツウのこと)	Released: 10 March 2004; Label: Pony Canyon	46	—	—	—	—	—
Cashmere Music	Released: 30 November 2005; Label: Pony Canyon	43	—	—	—	—	—
In Love Again (stylized in all-caps)	Released: 15 October 2008; Label: Tearbridge Records	15	—	—	—	19	—
Purple (stylized in all-caps)	Released: 3 March 2010; Label: Tearbridge Records	36	—	—	—	66	—
Toumei (透明)	Released: 23 February 2011; Label: Tearbridge Records	27	—	—	—	23	—
Yume no Tsuzuki (夢の続き)	Released: 14 March 2012; Label: Avex Trax	36	—	—	—	28	—
After The Rain	Released: 17 October 2018; Label: Universal Music	39	—	—	42	32	64
Taion, Kodō (体温、鼓動)	Released: 27 April 2022; Label: Sony Music Direct	47	—	—	45	33	—
Hateshinai Koto (果てしないこと)	Released: 8 March 2023; Label: Sony Music Direct	23	46	—	26	20	—
Long Story Short	Released: 21 January 2026; Label: Sony Music Direct	46	—	29	—	43	27
"—" denotes releases that did not chart or were not released in that region.

==== Compilation albums ====
Title	Album details	Peak chart positions					
Title	Album details	JPN	JPN Comb.	JPN Dg.	JPN Hot	JPN Sales	JPN DL
Toko: Best Selection (stylized as TOKO～best selection)	Released: 14 February 1998; Label: Sony Music Entertainment Japan	2	—	—	—	—	—
Middle and Mellow of Toko Furuuchi (stylized in small-caps)	Released: 18 February 2009; Label: Pony Canyon	—	—	—	—	—	—
The Singles: Sony Music Years 1993-2002 (stylized as THE SINGLES SONY MUSIC YEARS 1993～2002)	Released: 24 March 2010; Label: Sony Music Direct	—	—	—	—	—	—
And Then…: 20th Anniversary Best (stylized as and then... ~20th anniversary BEST~)	Released: 20 February 2013; Label: Avex Trax	39	—	—	—	—	—
Dareyori Sukinanoni: 25th Anniversary Best (誰より好きなのに～25th anniversary BEST～)	Released: 21 November 2018; Label: Sony Music Direct	—	—	—	—	68	—
"—" denotes releases that did not chart or were not released in that region.

==== Soundtrack albums ====
Title	Album details	Peak chart positions					
Title	Album details	JPN	JPN Comb.	JPN Dg.	JPN Hot	JPN Sales	JPN DL
Night and Day	Released: 21 September 1997; Label: Sony Music Entertainment Japan	—	—	—	—	—	—
"—" denotes releases that did not chart or were not released in that region.

==== Cover albums ====
Title	Album details	Peak chart positions					
Title	Album details	JPN	JPN Comb.	JPN Dg.	JPN Hot	JPN Sales	JPN DL
Crazy For You (stylized in all-caps)	Released: 21 November 2001; Label: Sony Music Entertainment Japan	—	—	—	—	—	—
Toko Furuuchi with 10 Legends (stylized as Toko Furuuchi with 10 legends)	Released: 30 March 2016; Label: Universal Music	26	—	—	64	28	—
"—" denotes releases that did not chart or were not released in that region.

==== Live albums ====
Title	Album details	Peak chart positions					
Title	Album details	JPN	JPN Comb.	JPN Dg.	JPN Hot	JPN Sales	JPN DL
Toko Furuuchi Billboard Live 2016	Released: 1 February 2016; Label: Amazon Records	—	—	—	—	—	—
25th Anniversary Live 2018: Toko Furuuchi (stylized as 25th ANNIVERSARY LIVE 2018 Toko Furuuchi)	Released: 26 December 2018; Label: Mastard Records	—	—	—	—	—	—
"—" denotes releases that did not chart or were not released in that region.

=== Singles ===
Title	Year	Details	Peak chart positions	Sales
Title	Year	Details	JPN	Sales
"Hayaku Isoide" (はやくいそいで)	1993	Released: 21 February 1993; Label: Sony Music Entertainment Japan	—	—
"Aitaikara" (逢いたいから)	1993	Released: 21 October 1993; Label: Sony Music Entertainment Japan	—	—
"Distance"f	1994	Released: 21 April 1994; Label: Sony Music Entertainment Japan	—	—
"Usotsuki" (うそつき)	1994	Released: 1 July 1994; Label: Sony Music Entertainment Japan	—	—
"Aruki Tsudzukeyo" (歩き続けよう)	1995	Released: 21 April 1995; Label: Sony Music Entertainment Japan	—	—
"Strength"	1995	Released: 21 August 1995; Label: Sony Music Entertainment Japan	—	—
"Dareyori Sukinanoni" (誰より好きなのに)	1996	Released: 22 May 1996; Label: Sony Music Entertainment Japan	35	—
"Kawaiku Naritai" (かわいくなりたい)	1996	Released: 21 July 1996; Label: Sony Music Entertainment Japan	—	—
"Takaramono" (宝物)	1997	Released: 21 February 1997; Label: Sony Music Entertainment Japan	48	—
"Daijoubu" (大丈夫)	1997	Released: 9 July 1997; Label: Sony Music Entertainment Japan	30	—
"Ginza" (銀座)	1998	Released: 21 January 1998; Label: Sony Music Entertainment Japan	39	—
"Kokoro Ni Shimai Mashou" (心にしまいましょう)	1998	Released: 29 July 1998; Label: Sony Music Entertainment Japan	—	—
"Awai Hanairo" (淡い花色)	1998	Released: 21 October 1998; Label: Sony Music Entertainment Japan	—	—
"Henji" (返事)	1999	Released: 8 September 1999; Label: Sony Music Entertainment Japan	46	—
"45 Fun" (45分)	1999	Released: 27 October 1999; Label: Sony Music Entertainment Japan	—	—
"Kinou Ni Sayonara" (昨日にさよなら)	2000	Released: 2 August 2000; Label: Sony Music Entertainment Japan	—	—
"My Brand New Day" (stylized as "My brand new day")	2000	Released: 1 November 2000; Label: Sony Music Entertainment Japan	—	—
"Soba ni Ite" (「そばにいて」)	2000	Released: 1 November 2000; Label: Sony Music Entertainment Japan	—	—
"In My Life" (stylized in all-caps)	2001	Released: 24 October 2001; Label: Sony Music Entertainment Japan	—	—
"Kono Tenohira" (この手のひら)	2002	Released: 6 February 2002; Label: Sony Music Entertainment Japan	—	—
"Koi Nante" (恋なんて)	2002	Released: 22 May 2002; Label: Sony Music Entertainment Japan	—	—
"Sayonara Aishiteta Hito" (サヨナラアイシテタヒト)	2003	Released: 19 November 2003; Label: Pony Canyon	—	—
"Stay" (stylized in small-caps)	2004	Released: 18 February 2004; Label: Pony Canyon	—	—
"Beautiful Days"	2005	Released: 29 June 2005; Label: Pony Canyon	—	—
"Coat o Katte" (コートを買って)	2005	Released: 16 November 2005; Label: Pony Canyon	—	—
"A to XYZ"/"Slow Beat" (コートを買って) (with Kreva)	2009	Released: 14 October 2009; Label: Tearbridge Records	26	—
"—" denotes releases that did not chart or were not released in that region.
