= Growing (Rina Chinen album) =

Studio album by Rina Chinen
- Released: June 10, 1998
- Recorded: 1996–1998
- Genre: J-pop; dance-pop
- Length: 56:02
- Language: Japanese
- Label: Sony Music Entertainment Japan
- Producer: Jonny Taira; Yukihito Sakakibara; Kaku Yoshida; Hiroaki Hayama; Cozy Kubo

Rina Chinen chronology
| Growing (1998) | Passage ~Best Collection~ (2000) |

Singles from Growing
- 1. "Do-Do for Me" Released: October 21, 1996; 2. "Precious Delicious" Released: March 31, 1997; 3. "Pinch ~Love Me Deeper~" Released: September 18, 1997; 4. "Break Out Emotion" Released: January 28, 1998; 5. "Wing" Released: April 15, 1998

Growing (グローイング, Gurōingu) is the debut studio album by Japanese singer Rina Chinen, released on June 10, 1998 by Sony Music Entertainment Japan. It features the singles "Do-Do for Me", "Precious Delicious", "Pinch ~Love Me Deeper~", "Break Out Emotion", and "Wing".

The album peaked at No. 2 on Oricon's albums chart. It was also certified Platinum by the RIAJ.

== Track listing ==
All lyrics are written by Hiromi Mori, except where indicated; all music is composed and arranged by Hiroaki Hayama, except where indicated.

| No. | Title | Lyrics | Music | Arrangement | Length |
|---|---|---|---|---|---|
| 1. | "Road" | | | | 4:04 |
| 2. | "Hard Rain" | | | | 4:23 |
| 3. | "Wing" | | | | 4:50 |
| 4. | "Pinch ~Love Me Deeper~" | Kanata Asamizu | Joey Carbone; Mike Egizi | Hiroshi Matsui | 4:57 |
| 5. | "Do-Do for Me [U.K. Mix]" | Takahiro Maeda | Cozy Kubo | Kubo; Dave Ford | 5:53 |
| 6. | "Home ~Natsukashī Mado~" ((Home 〜なつかしい窓〜; "Home ~A Nostalgic Window~")) | | | | 4:07 |
| 7. | "Precious Delicious [Solid Mix]" | Maeda | Kubo | Kubo | 5:09 |
| 8. | "Lovers ~Jun'ai~" ((Lovers 〜純愛〜; "Lovers ~Pure Love~")) | | | | 5:31 |
| 9. | "Break Out Emotion" | Masumi Iizuka | Keiichi Ueno | Ueno | 3:47 |
| 10. | "Pride + Joy [High Potential Mix]" | Neko Oikawa | Carbone; Jeff Carruthers | Matsui; Tohru Takahashi | 4:51 |
| 11. | "Lost Word" | | | | 4:13 |
| 12. | "Moonlight ~Michiteku Kimochi~" ((Moonlight 〜満ちてく気持ち〜; "Moonlight ~Feeling Complete~")) | | | | 4:17 |
| Total length: | | | | | 56:02 |

== Charts ==
| Chart (1998) | Peak position |
|---|---|
| Japanese Albums (Oricon) | 2 |

== Certification ==
| Region | Certification | Certified units/sales |
|---|---|---|
| Japan (RIAJ) | Platinum | 400,000^{^} |
^{^} Shipments figures based on certification alone.
