= Breath (Rina Chinen album) =

Studio album by Rina Chinen
- Released: July 4, 2001
- Recorded: 2000–2001
- Genres: J-pop; dance-pop
- Length: 69:00
- Language: Japanese
- Label: Sony Music Entertainment Japan

Rina Chinen chronology
Passage ~Best Collection~ (2000)	Breath (2001)	20th Anniversary ~Singles & My Favorites~ (2017)

Singles from Breath
- 1. "Love, Make Together" Released: September 20, 2000; 2. "Club Zipangu" Released: November 15, 2000; 3. "Just Believe" Released: December 6, 2000; 4. "Love You Close" Released: March 7, 2001

Breath (ブレス, Buresu) is the second and final studio album by Japanese singer Rina Chinen, released on July 4, 2001 by Sony Music Entertainment Japan. The album includes the single "Club Zipangu", which is based on Ricky Martin's "She Bangs". With her album and single sales in a steep decline, Chinen retired from the pop music scene to focus on her career as a musical actress.

The album peaked at No. 28 on Oricon's albums chart.

== Track listing ==
All music is composed and arranged by Ryuichirou Yamaki, except where indicated.

No.	Title	Lyrics	Music	Arrangement	Length
1.	"Overture... Breath..."				1:36
2.	"Butterfly"	Rina Chinen; H.U.B			3:47
3.	"Love, Make Together"	UNI			4:10
4.	"Never Goes Away"	UNI	Himeko Yamamoto	Sadahiro Nakano	4:24
5.	"Taion" ((体温; "Body Temperature"))	Akifumi Shiota			5:32
6.	"My Dear Dreamers"	Shiota			3:32
7.	"Jealousy" (Jerashī (ジェラシー))	Saki Nishina	Hiroshi Furukawa	Nakano	4:55
8.	"Love You Close [Album Version]"	Hiromi Mori	Chika Ueda	Toshiaki Ōtsubo	4:42
9.	"Early Morning"	H.U.B	Hisashi Nawata		4:43
10.	"Universe ~Ring of the Ring Finger~"	Shiota			4:28
11.	"Control"	H.U.B			4:02
12.	"Give Me Your Love"	Uran	Kaoru Ōkubo	Nakano	4:08
13.	"Just Believe"	Uran	Ōkubo	Maestro-T	4:28
14.	"Rendez-vous ~Taikiken wo Nukedasō~" ((rendez-vous〜大気圏を抜け出そう〜; "Rendez-vous ~Let's Escape the Atmosphere~))	H.U.B			4:15
15.	"Tom"	Chinen			6:56
16.	"Club Zipangu (Note: Cover of Ricky Martin's "She Bangs")" (bonus track)	Chinfa Kan	Desmond Child; Walter Afanasieff; Robi Draco Rosa; Glenn Monroig; Julia Sierra; Daniel López	Yūji Toriyama	4:12
Total length:					69:00

== Charts ==
Chart (2001)	Peak position
Japanese Albums (Oricon)	28
