= Passage: Best Collection =

Passage ~Best Collection~

Greatest hits album by Rina Chinen
- Released: March 23, 2000
- Recorded: 1996–2000
- Genre: J-pop; dance-pop
- Length: 61:27
- Language: Japanese
- Label: Sony Music Entertainment Japan

Rina Chinen chronology
Growing (1998)	Passage ~Best Collection~ (2000)	Breath (2001)

Singles from Passage ~Best Collection~
- 1. "Be Yourself" Released: July 15, 1998; 2. "Yes" Released: January 13, 1999; 3. "God Bless the World" Released: March 31, 1999; 4. "Be Proud" Released: June 23, 1999; 5. "In Your Eyes" Released: September 29, 1999; 6. "Baby Love" Released: February 4, 2000

Alternative cover
- Alternate cover

Passage ~Best Collection~ is a greatest hits album by Japanese singer Rina Chinen, released on March 23, 2000, by Sony Music Entertainment Japan. The album compiles Chinen's singles from 1996 to 2000 and includes the new song "Again".

The album peaked at No. 10 on Oricon's albums chart.

== Track listing ==
No.	Title	Lyrics	Music	Arrangement	Length
1.	"Do-Do for Me"	Takahiro Maeda	Cozy Kubo	Kubo	4:59
2.	"Precious Delicious"	Maeda	Kubo	Kubo	5:15
3.	"Pinch ~Love Me Deeper~"	Kanata Asamizu	Joey Carbone; Mike Egizi	Hiroshi Matsui	4:58
4.	"Break Out Emotion"	Masumi Iizuka	Keiichi Ueno	Ueno	3:51
5.	"Wing"	Hiromi Mori	Hiroaki Hayama	Hayama	4:50
6.	"Be Yourself"	Mori	Hayama	Hayama	4:31
7.	"Yes"	T2ya	T2ya	T2ya	4:49
8.	"God Bless the World"	Hanano Tanaka	HIM	Takehiro Kawabe	4:39
9.	"Be Proud"	Yūko Ebine	T2ya	T2ya	4:11
10.	"In Your Eyes"	Kentarō Akutsu	Hayama	Hayama	4:42
11.	"Baby Love"	Rina Chinen; Akira Nakazawa; Tetsurō Oda	Oda	Oda; DJ Take	5:12
12.	"My Wish [Acoustic Version]"	T2ya	T2ya	T2ya; Kawabe	4:50
13.	"Again"	T2ya	T2ya	T2ya; Kawabe	4:38
Total length:					61:27

== Charts ==
Chart (2000)	Peak position
Japanese Albums (Oricon)	10
