= 20th Anniversary: Singles & My Favorites =

Compilation album by Rina Chinen
- Released: February 8, 2017
- Recorded: 1996–2017
- Genres: J-pop; dance-pop; musical
- Length: 2:26:10
- Language: Japanese
- Label: Sony Music Direct

Rina Chinen chronology
Breath (2001)	20th Anniversary: Singles & My Favorites (2017)	30th Anniversary: The Essential 10 Songs (2026)

Alternative cover
- Alternate cover

20th Anniversary: Singles & My Favorites is a compilation album by Japanese singer Rina Chinen, released on February 8, 2017, by Sony Music Entertainment Japan to commemorate the 20th anniversary of her music career and celebrate her 36th birthday. The two-disc album compiles Chinen's singles from 1996 to 2001, plus select tracks from her previous releases and two tracks from her stage musical career.

The album peaked at No. 117 on Oricon's albums chart.

== Track listing ==
Disc 1
No.	Title	Lyrics	Music	Arrangement	Length
1.	"Do-Do for Me"	Takahiro Maeda	Cozy Kubo	Kubo	5:02
2.	"Precious Delicious"	Maeda	Kubo	Kubo	5:16
3.	"Pinch (Love Me Deeper)"	Kanata Asamizu	Joey Carbone; Mike Egizi	Hiroshi Matsui	5:00
4.	"Break Out Emotion"	Masumi Iizuka	Keiichi Ueno	Ueno	3:52
5.	"Wing"	Hiromi Mori	Hiroaki Hayama	Hayama	4:51
6.	"Be Yourself"	Mori	Hayama	Hayama	4:34
7.	"Yes"	T2ya	T2ya	T2ya	4:51
8.	"God Bless the World"	Hanano Tanaka	HIM	Takehiro Kawabe	4:40
9.	"Be Proud"	Yūko Ebine	T2ya	T2ya	4:13
10.	"In Your Eyes"	Kentarō Akutsu	Hayama	Hayama	4:44
11.	"Baby Love"	Rina Chinen; Akira Nakazawa; Tetsurō Oda	Oda	Oda; DJ Take	5:14
12.	"Love, Make Together"	UNI	Ryuichirou Yamaki	Yamaki	4:17
13.	"Club Zipangu (Note: Cover of Ricky Martin's "She Bangs")"	Chinfa Kan	Desmond Child; Walter Afanasieff; Robi Draco Rosa; Glenn Monroig; Julia Sierra; Daniel López	Yūji Toriyama	4:13
14.	"Just Believe"	Uran	Kaoru Ōkubo	Maestro-T	4:29
15.	"Love You Close"	Mori	Chika Ueda	Toshiaki Ōtsubo	4:39

Disc 2
No.	Title	Lyrics	Music	Arrangement	Length
1.	"My Wish"	T2ya	T2ya	T2ya; Kawabe	4:32
2.	"Home: Natsukashī Mado" ((Home 〜なつかしい窓〜; "Home ~A Nostalgic Window~"))	Mori	Hayama	Hayama	4:09
3.	"Road"	Mori	Hayama	Hayama	4:05
4.	"Again"	T2ya	T2ya	T2ya; Kawabe	4:40
5.	"Pleasure"	Iizuka	Ueno	Ueno	4:23
6.	"Hard Rain"	Mori	Hayama	Hayama	4:25
7.	"Pride + Joy"	Neko Oikawa	Carbone; Jeff Carruthers	Matsui	4:02
8.	"Butterfly"	Chinen; H.U.B	Yamaki	Yamaki	3:48
9.	"Black Paradise"	Maeda	Kubo	Kubo	5:15
10.	"Control"	H.U.B	Yamaki	Yamaki	4:02
11.	"Evermore"	UNI	Yamaki	Yamaki	5:27
12.	"Lovers: Jun'ai" ((Lovers 〜純愛〜; "Lovers ~Pure Love~"))	Mori	Hayama	Hayama	5:32
13.	"Cry-Max"	Maeda	Kubo	Kubo	4:47
14.	"Topping Cherry"	Akio Inoue	Oda	Oda	4:23
15.	"Sukidatta yo" ((好きだったよ; "I Like It"))	Inoue	Oda	Oda	5:19
16.	"Inochi wo Ageyō (from Miss Saigon)" ((命をあげよう; "I'd Give My Life for You"))	Tokiko Iwatani; Alain Boublil; Richard Maltby Jr.	Claude-Michel Schönberg		3:53
17.	"Yume Yaburete (from Les Misérables)" ((夢やぶれて; "I Dreamed a Dream"))	Iwatani; Yōko Sakai; Boublil; Jean-Marc Natel	Schönberg		3:33

== Charts ==
Chart (2017)	Peak position
Japanese Albums (Oricon)	117

== 30th Anniversary: The Essential 10 Songs ==
30th Anniversary: The Essential 10 Songs

Compilation album by Rina Chinen
- Released: December 23, 2026
- Recorded: 1996–2001
- Genres: J-pop; dance-pop; musical
- Language: Japanese
- Label: Great Tracks

Rina Chinen chronology
20th Anniversary: Singles & My Favorites (2017)	30th Anniversary: The Essential 10 Songs (2026)

To celebrate Chinen's 30th anniversary, a shorter version of 20th Anniversary: Singles & My Favorites will be released exclusively on a translucent red LP as 30th Anniversary: The Essential 10 Songs by Great Tracks on 23 December 2026.

=== Track listing ===
Side one
No.	Title	Lyrics	Music	Arrangement	Length
1.	"Do-Do for Me"	Takahiro Maeda	Cozy Kubo	Kubo
2.	"Precious Delicious"	Maeda	Kubo	Kubo
3.	"Wing"	Hiromi Mori	Hiroaki Hayama	Hayama
4.	"Break Out Emotion"	Masumi Iizuka	Keiichi Ueno	Ueno
5.	"Be Yourself"	Mori	Hayama	Hayama

Side one
No.	Title	Lyrics	Music	Arrangement	Length
1.	"Club Zipangu"	Chinfa Kan	Desmond Child; Walter Afanasieff; Robi Draco Rosa; Glenn Monroig; Julia Sierra; Daniel López	Yūji Toriyama
2.	"Yes"	T2ya	T2ya	T2ya
3.	"Pinch (Love Me Deeper)"	Kanata Asamizu	Joey Carbone; Mike Egizi	Hiroshi Matsui
4.	"God Bless the World"	Hanano Tanaka	HIM	Takehiro Kawabe
5.	"Love You Close" (single version)	Mori	Chika Ueda	Toshiaki Ōtsubo
