= Rina Chinen =

Japanese entertainer (born 1981)

- 知念 里奈
- Born: 9 February 1981 (age 45); Shuri, Naha, Okinawa, Japan
- Occupations: Actress; singer-songwriter; television personality
- Agent: Rising Production
- Height: 162 cm (5 ft 4 in)
- Spouses: Kentaro Nakamura (m. 2005; div. 2007) Yoshio Inoue (m. 2016)
- Children: 2
- Musical career
- Genres: J-pop; dance-pop
- Years active: 1996–present
- Label: SME
- Website: www.sonymusic.co.jp/artist/RinaChinen/

Rina Chinen (知念 里奈, Chinen Rina; born 9 February 1981), is a Japanese entertainer, former singer, and musical theater actress. She is affiliated with Rising Production.

== History ==
Rina Chinen took lessons as a child from the Okinawa Actors School. By the time she reached junior high, she relocated to Osaka due to her father's work, but she continued to take lessons at the Okinawa Actors School during the weekend. Chinen moved to Tokyo shortly after graduating from high school.

== Music career ==
In October 1996, Chinen made her music debut with the single "Do-Do for Me". A year later, her second single "Precious Delicious" earned her the Best New Artist Award at the 39th Japan Record Awards, with her third single, "Pinch ~Love Me Deeper~", being used as the third and final ending theme for the anime series, Kodomo no Omocha that same year. In 1998, her fifth single "Wing" peaked at No. 5 on Oricon's singles chart, becoming her biggest hit.

On 15 July 2001, Chinen performed at the Music Fest Peace of Ryukyu, a music festival featuring Okinawan artists. As her pop music activity decreased, she pursued a career in musical acting in 2003.

On 21 October 2021, Sony Music Entertainment Japan released all 81 of Chinen's songs internationally on digital streaming platforms to commemorate the 25th anniversary of her debut.

== Acting career ==
=== Television ===
In July 1996, Chinen made her acting debut in the drama series Gakkō no Kaidan R (学校の怪談R; School Kaidan R). In 2002, Chinen appeared in the drama series Yume no California (夢のカリフォルニア; California Dreamin).

On 29 July 2020, Chinen was announced as part of the cast of the Toei tokusatsu drama Kamen Rider Saber.

=== Musical theatre ===
Chinen made her musical theatre debut in the Tokyo production of Jekyll & Hyde in December 2003. A year later, she starred in the localized adaptations of Miss Saigon and Fiddler on the Roof. In 2005, Chinen appeared in the Tokyo production of Les Misérables. She has since taken multiple roles for Miss Saigon and Les Misérables until 2022. Chinen is the first actress in Japan to do both Cosette, Éponine and Fantine in Les Misérables followed by Erika Ikuta, who became the second actress to do so and she is also the first actress in Japan to do both Kim and Ellen in Miss Saigon. Chinen also played Winifred Banks in the Japanese stage production of Mary Poppins in 2022 and 2026.

== Personal life ==
On 10 August 2005, Chinen, at the age of 24, registered her marriage to model Kentaro Nakamura, aged 22. The couple were expecting a child at the time she was cast in Jekyll & Hyde; her part was consequently reassigned to Ranran Suzuki. Chinen announced she planned on taking maternity leave after the drama finished its season, and would continue working after becoming a mother. Chinen gave birth to a baby boy on 11 March 2006. Chinen and Nakamura divorced on 15 March 2007. Nakamura was arrested on drug charges in June of that year.

Chinen married actor Yoshio Inoue on 27 July 2016. She gave birth to her second boy on 12 June 2018.

On 9 December 2019, Chinen announced that she had passed the high school graduation certification exam.

== Discography ==
=== Singles ===
List of singles, with selected chart positions
Title	Date	Peak chart positions	Sales (JPN)	RIAJ certification	Album
Title	Date	Oricon Singles Charts	Sales (JPN)	RIAJ certification	Album
"Do-Do for Me"	21 October 1996	37			Growing
"Precious Delicious"	31 March 1997	18			Growing
"Pinch ~Love Me Deeper~"	18 September 1997	20			Growing
"Break Out Emotion"	28 January 1998	24			Growing
"Wing"	15 April 1998	5		Gold	Growing
"Be Yourself"	15 July 1998	9		Gold	Passage ~Best Collection~
"Yes"	13 January 1999	6		Gold	Passage ~Best Collection~
"God Bless the World"	31 March 1999	9			Passage ~Best Collection~
"Be Proud"	23 June 1999	15			Passage ~Best Collection~
"In Your Eyes"	29 September 1999	18			Passage ~Best Collection~
"Baby Love"	4 February 2000	25			Passage ~Best Collection~
"Love, Make Together"	20 September 2000	26			Breath
"Club Zipangu"	15 November 2000	34			Breath
"Just Believe"	6 December 2000	39			Breath
"Love You Close"	7 March 2001	39			Breath
"—" denotes releases that did not chart.

=== Studio albums ===
Year	Information	Oricon weekly peak position	Sales	RIAJ certification
1998	Growing: Released: 10 June 1998; Label: Sony Japan; Formats: CD, MD	2		Platinum
2001	Breath: Released: 4 July 2001; Label: Sony Japan; Formats: CD	28		

=== Compilation albums ===
Year	Information	Oricon weekly peak position	Sales	RIAJ certification
2000	Passage: Best Collection: Released: 23 March 2000; Label: Sony Japan; Formats: CD	10		
2017	20th Anniversary: Singles & My Favorites: Released: 8 February 2017; Label: Sony Music Direct; Formats: CD	117		
2026	30th Anniversary: The Essential 10 Songs: Released: 23 December 2026; Label: Great Tracks; Formats: LP	TBA		

== Videography ==
Year	Information	Oricon weekly peak position	Sales	RIAJ certification
1998	Plain Video Clips: Released: 29 July 1998 (VHS); 19 September 1998 (DVD); Label: Sony Japan; Formats: VHS, DVD	—		
1999	Growing Tour 1999: Released: 14 July 1999 (VHS); 4 August 1999 (DVD); Label: Sony Japan; Formats: VHS, DVD	—		
2000	Rina Clips 98–00: Released: 29 March 2000; Label: Sony Japan; Formats: VHS, DVD	—		
2022	Refined Growing Tour 1999 & Music Videos: Released: 28 September 2022; Label: Sony Japan; Formats: 2BD	—		

== Filmography ==
=== TV ===
- Gakkō no Kaidan R (Kansai TV, 1996) – Kazuko Miyata
- Shin-D – "Love Blood" (Kansai TV, 1997)
- Five (NTV, 1997) – Madoka
- Yume no California (TBS, 2002)
- Kochira Hon Ikegami Sho (TBS, 2002—2005) – Atsuko Shindō
- Asami Mitsuhiko Series 19: Yuta ga Aishita Tantei (Fuji TV, 2004) – Kaori
- Kyoto Chiken no Onna (TV Asahi, 2010) – Kumi Sekimoto
- SP ~ Keishichō Keigo-ka (TV Asahi, 2012) – Yuri Sudō
- First Class (Fuji TV, 2014) – Madoka Ōkubo
- Lunch Detective ~ Koi to Gourmet to Nazotoki to ~ (YTV, 2020) – Ritsuko Shiraishi
- Kamen Rider Saber (TV Asahi, 2020) – Sophia

=== TV animation ===
- Star Twinkle PreCure (2019) – Mary Anne

=== Film ===
- Seishun Mandala! (2010) – Miki
- Saber + Zenkaiger: Superhero Senki (2021) - Sophia

=== Film animation ===
- Doraemon: Nobita and the Winged Braves (2001) – Tsubakuro
- Star Twinkle PreCure the Movie: These Feelings Within the Song of Stars (2019) – Mary Anne

=== Dubbing ===
- The Star (2017) – Mary

=== Musicals ===
- Jekyll & Hyde – Emma Carew (December 2003)
- Miss Saigon – Kim (2004–2014), Ellen (2016–2022)
- Fiddler on the Roof – Hodel (2004)
- Les Misérables – Cosette (2005), Éponine (2007–2009), Fantine (2011–2021)
- Rudolf – Princess Stephanie of Belgium (2008)
- Dance of the Vampires – Sarah (2009–2011)
- She Loves Me – Ilona Ritter (2009)
- Oh! Tabaruzaka – Fujimaki (2010)
- Himeyuri – Kimi (2010)
- SHOW-ismIV TATTOO 14 – Guest Sky (2013)
- Ludwig B – Eleanore von Breuning (2014)
- Radiant Baby – Amanda (2016)
- Mary Poppins – Winfred Banks (2022–2026)
- Song Cycle Musical: In a world of never ending rain in 2024 – Performer (2024)
- Ludwig B 〜HEART SONG (Unmei no tobira wa aka reta)〜 – Julie "Giulietta" Guicciardi (2024)
- Kane and Abel – Zaphia (2025)

Preceded by Puffy	Japan Record Award for Best New Artist; 1997	Succeeded by Morning Musume
