= Mayuu Yokota =

Japanese actress and model (born 1999)

- Born: June 30, 1999 (age 26); Tokyo, Japan
- Occupations: Actress; model
- Years active: 2014–present
- Agent: Asia Cross
- Modeling information
- Height: 168 cm (5 ft 6 in)
- Hair color: black
- Eye color: brown

Japanese name
- Kanji: 横田真悠
- Hiragana: よこた まゆう
Transcriptions
- Romanization: Yokota Mayū

Mayuu Yokota (横田 真悠, Yokota Mayū; born June 30, 1999) is a Japanese model and actress.

== Career ==
Yokota entered the entertainment industry after winning the grand prize in the Miss Seventeen 2014 modelling competition. She made her acting debut in the January 2019 NTV drama, Mr. Hiiragi's Homeroom.

In January 2020, she appeared in two television dramas; the TBS drama Prayers in the Emergency Room, and the MBS special drama Homeroom. On March 7 of the same year, Yokota made her film debut in the movie Dance, Mita.

On October 1, 2020, with the November issue of the women's fashion magazine Seventeen released, she "graduated" from being their exclusive model. On May 15 of the same year, she launched her own YouTube channel. On September 19 and 26, she starred in the 11th and final episodes of TV Tokyo's Girls' Gourmet Burger Club, marking her first lead role in a television drama. Yokota became an exclusive model for the December issue of the women's fashion magazine Non-no.

On June 20, 2021, it was broadcast by Sekai no Hate Made Itte Q! that she would be joining as a new cast member on the show. On October 1 of the same year, she landed her first lead role in a film in the movie DIVOC-12.

On March 4, 2022, Yokota co-starred with Kentaro Ito in the drama Yamibu-REAL-. In the same year, she starred in the Kansai television drama Convenience Store★Heroes: We've received your SOS!!.

== Filmography ==
=== Film ===
Year	Title	Role	Notes	Ref(s)
2020	Dance, Mita	Mineta		
2021	Ito	Tomomi Fukushi		
2021	Saber + Zenkaiger: Super Hero Senki	Luna (adult)		
2021	Mirrorliar Films Season 1 "Petto"		Anthology film	
2021	DIVOC-12	Nao	Lead role; anthology film	
2022	The Blue Skies at Your Feet	Tomoka Nishimura		
2022	Re/Member	Rie Narudo		
2022	Flame Cinderella	Yuka Yoshizumi		
2023	Whale Bones	Rin		
2024	Drawing Closer	Ayaka Miura		
2024	Secret: A Hidden Score	Hikari Asano		
2025	Stella Next to Me	Hazuki Shinohara		
2026	Sakamoto Days	Lu Xiaotang		

=== Television drama ===
Year	Title	Role	Notes	Ref(s)
2019	Mr. Hiiragi's Homeroom	Sara Hanaoka		
2019	Designer Naoto Shibui's Holiday	Megumi	Episode 11	
2019	Cheat: Beware of Fraudsters	Yuna		
2020	Homeroom	Yua Natsume		
2020	Prayers in the Emergency Room	Akane Iizuka		
2020	O Maidens in Your Savage Season	Rika Sonezaki		
2020	Girls Gourmet Burger Club	Noeru Kiba	Lead role	
2020	Tales of the Unusual: Autumn 2020 "Imaginary Friends"	Kaori Yamagishi	Short drama	
2021	Captivated, by You	Minoru Sato	Episode 1	
2021	Kamen Rider Saber	Luna (adult)		
2021	Anyway, I Won't Run Away	Naho Nodakura		
2021	Beauty of Restoration			
2022	Tomodachi Game R4	Yutori Kokorogi		
2022	Convenience Store★Heroes: We've received your SOS!!	Akari Beni	Lead role	
2022	Lapis Lazuli and Crystals Shine When Illuminated	Misa Yoshida		
2022–23	Tomorrow, I'll Be Someone's Girlfriend	Lina	2 Seasons	
2023	Hold My Hand at Twilight	Nanami	Episodes 1–2	
2023	Police and Prosecutor, Sometimes with Judge	Sayaka Morino		
2024	Mars	Kyoka Sakuraba		
2024	Ms. Saionji Doesn't Do Housework	Emily Takeda		
2024	Hustlein' Boy	Yukako Satonaka		
2025	Ensemble	Izumi Makanako		

=== Web series ===
Year	Title	Role	Notes	Ref(s)
2019	If You Follow Me, It's Over	Chiharu Todoroki		
2021	Hot Mama	Yumi Tokugawa		
2022	Darkness -REAL-	Miya Sawatari	Lead role	

== Videography ==
=== Music videos ===
Year	Artists	Title	Notes	Ref(s)
2018	Have a Nice Day!	Never Let Me Go		
2019	Bolbbalgan4	To My Adolescence		

=== Commercials ===
Year	Company	Notes	Ref(s)
2016	Tokyo Gas		
2022	Musee Platinum		
2022	Tutuanna	Muse	
2023	Eureka		
2024	Reckitt Benckiser Japan	Brand ambassador	
