= 39th Japan Record Awards =

1997 Japanese music awards ceremony

- Date: 31 December 1997
- Venue: TBS A-Studio, Tokyo
- Hosted by: Masaaki Sakai

Television/radio coverage
- Network: TBS

The 39th Annual Japan Record Awards took place on 31 December 1997, starting at 6:30PM JST. The primary ceremonies were televised in Japan on TBS.

== Award winners ==
- Japan Record Award:
  - Tetsuya Komuro (producer) & Namie Amuro for "Can You Celebrate?"
- Best Vocalist:
  - Mitsuko Nakamura
- Best New Artist:
  - Rina Chinen for "Precious Delicious"
- Best Album:
  - Glay for "BELOVED"
