= Across Entertainment =

Japanese voice acting entertainment company

- Company type: Joint-stock company
- Industry: Entertainment
- Founded: April 2008 in Tokyo, Japan
- Founder: Atsushi Fujisaki
- Headquarters: Tokyo, Japan
- Website: across-ent.com

Across Entertainment (アクロス エンタテインメント, Akurosu Entateimento) is a Japanese voice acting entertainment company founded by Atsushi Fujisaki in April 2008.

== Attached talent ==
=== Male ===
- Kazuo Asakura
- Sumitada Azumano
- Masashi Igarashi
- ikki
- Hidekazu Uto
- Yoshihisa Kawahara
- Naru Kawamoto
- Toshiaki Kuwahara
- Fuminori Komatsu
- Tsuyoshi Koyama
- Naoya Nakanishi
- Kouji Namekata
- Yoshiaki Hasegawa
- Natsuki Hanae
- Tomoyasu Hishiba
- Yuichi Fujita
- Yuichi Jose
- Chado Horii
- Taishi Murata
- Takuma Motoyuki
- Shugo Nakamura
- Kōichi Yamadera
- Hisayoshi Yamane
- Ryo Wakabayashi

=== Female ===
- Kanako Ishida
- Yūko Ishibashi
- Mariya Ise
- Oura Fuyuka
- Nami Okamoto
- Ikuko Kato
- Tomoko Kaneda
- Rie Kikuchi
- Marimo Kitagawa
- Kanae Kuninaka
- Miyu Komaki
- Michiko Komatsu
- Chie Sawaguchi
- Rina Shiratori
- Mayuko Suzuki
- Yukiko Takashima
- Kaori Takaoka
- Yoshiko Takeda
- Ai Terashima
- Misako Tomioka
- Nakano Nozomi
- Rinko Natsuhi
- Teruko Nishikawa
- Mami Nishikawa
- Arisa Nishiguchi
- Sandra Hijikata
- Yuka Hirata
- Kanami Satō
- Yasuko Fujino
- Yuuki Matsumoto
- Akira Miki
- Kaoru Mizuhara
- Yukako Mino
- Rei Mochiduki
- Kiyu Morita
- Sayaka Yukino
- Tomoe Watanabe
- Aya Uchida
- Nichika Ōmori
- Ai Furihata
- Ayaka Fukuhara
- Mei Hanakawa (Note: Mei Hanakawa is credited as Hikari Kabashima (椛島 光, Kabashima Hikari). She went by the stage name Yui Asakura (浅倉 唯, Asakura Yui) in 2020–2022, mainly during the filming of Kamen Rider Revice.)

== Formerly attached talent ==
- Goblin
- Hiroki Gotō
- Mitsuo Iwata
- Ryōtsu Saitō
