= List of Kamen Rider Saber episodes =

Kamen Rider Saber is a Japanese tokusatsu drama in Toei Company's Kamen Rider series produced by TV Asahi. It is the second series in the Reiwa period run and the 31st series overall.

In keeping with the series' storybook theme, the episodes are denominated as "chapters" while the titles are based on lines from fairy tales and fantasy books.

== Episodes ==
| No. | Title | Directed by | Written by | Original release date |
|---|---|---|---|---|
| 1 | "In the Beginning, There Was a Flame Swordsman."; Transliteration: "Hajime ni, Honō no Kenshi Ari." (Japanese: はじめに、炎の剣士あり。) | Takayuki Shibasaki | Takuro Fukuda | September 6, 2020 |
Novelist and bookstore owner Touma Kamiyama suffers a recurring dream about a place called Wonder World invading the real world and his inability to save a mysterious young girl named Luna 15 years prior. His dreams become reality when he is dragged into a war to decide the fate of both worlds, so he takes matters into his own hands when he obtains the means to transform into Kamen Rider Saber.
| 2 | "The Water Swordsman Along With a Blue Lion."; Transliteration: "Mizu no Kenshi, Aoi Raion to Tomo ni." (Japanese: 水の剣士、青いライオンとともに。) | Takayuki Shibasaki | Takuro Fukuda | September 13, 2020 |
Touma is visited by a man from the Sword of Logos, Rintaro Shindo, who has come to relieve him of his SworDriver and Brave Dragon Wonder Ride Book. When Touma refuses to give them up, Rintaro takes him to his organization's headquarters to debrief him on the conflict he has become involved in. Touma now faces the choice of whether to use his power as Kamen Rider Saber to save people and the world, or stay out of it.
| 3 | "A Father and a Swordsman."; Transliteration: "Chichi de Ari, Kenshi." (Japanese: 父であり、剣士。) | Shojiro Nakazawa | Nobuhiro Mouri | September 20, 2020 |
Touma meets two other members of the Sword of Logos. One is Kento Fukamiya, his childhood friend, and the other is Ryo Ogami, a great swordsman who divides his time between fighting and raising his son, Sora.
| 4 | "The Book Was Opened, Therefore."; Transliteration: "Hon o Hiraita, Sore Yue ni." (Japanese: 本を開いた、それゆえに。) | Shojiro Nakazawa | Nobuhiro Mouri | September 27, 2020 |
Despite Ryo defeating the Hanzaki Megid, the place it attacked did not return to normal and Sora is still missing. In response, Touma and the other members of the Sword of Logos look for a way to rescue him.
| 5 | "My Friend Is the Thunder Swordsman."; Transliteration: "Waga Tomo, Kaminari no Kenshi ni Tsuki." (Japanese: 我が友、雷の剣士につき。) | Kazuya Kamihoriuchi | Takuro Fukuda | October 4, 2020 |
Touma and his friends must face Kamen Rider Calibur, a former member of the Sword of Logos who defected to the Megid's side. Meanwhile, Touma realizes that Kento is disturbed by the enemy's appearance and learns the connection between them.
| 6 | "Appearing Like the Wind."; Transliteration: "Hayate no Gotoku, Kenzan." (Japanese: 疾風の如く、見参。) | Kazuya Kamihoriuchi | Takuro Fukuda | October 11, 2020 |
Another member of the Sword of Logos, Ren Akamichi, visits Touma's bookstore seeking Kento's recognition. When he learns of Kento and Touma's friendship however, the young ninja develops a rivalry with the latter. Meanwhile, Megid commanders Storius, Legeiel, and Zooous make their move against the Sword of Logos.
| 7 | "The Sword of the King Lies in Avalon."; Transliteration: "Ō no Tsurugi, Avaron ni Ari." (Japanese: 王の剣、アヴァロンにあり。) | Hidenori Ishida | Keiichi Hasegawa | October 18, 2020 |
Touma and Kento depart to look for the mythical land of Avalon so the former can unseal his sword, but Calibur stands in their way, intending to claim the secret power located there for himself.
| 8 | "The Sealed Arthur."; Transliteration: "Fūin Sareshi wa, Āsā." (Japanese: 封印されしは、アーサー。) | Hidenori Ishida | Keiichi Hasegawa | October 25, 2020 |
After claiming the King of Arthur Wonder Ride Book and unsealing his sword, Touma begins to doubt if he can master the former's power. After Ryo is turned into stone while protecting him however, he comes up with an idea to rescue him with help from his friends.
| 9 | "The Overlapping of the Swordsman's Timbre."; Transliteration: "Kasanariau, Kenshi no Neiro." (Japanese: 重なり合う、剣士の音色。) | Koichi Sakamoto | Nobuhiro Mouri | November 8, 2020 |
After his recent feats, Touma is recognized by the others as a full-fledged member of the Sword of Logos, but when the Megids prepare multiple Alter Books for their next plan, Tetsuo Daishinji, the order's mechanic, joins the fray as Kamen Rider Slash after repairing his own weapon.
| 10 | "Crossing Swords and Crossing Feelings."; Transliteration: "Majiwaru Tsurugi to, Kōsa Suru Omoi." (Japanese: 交わる剣と、交差する想い。) | Koichi Sakamoto | Nobuhiro Mouri | November 15, 2020 |
Calibur steals some Wonder Ride Books from the Sword of Logos to complete his plan. While fighting to get them back, Touma and his companions discover his true identity.
| 11 | "The Storming Thunder and the Spreading of Dark Clouds."; Transliteration: "Midareru Kaminari, Hirogaru An'un." (Japanese: 乱れる雷、広がる暗雲。) | Shojiro Nakazawa | Keiichi Hasegawa | November 22, 2020 |
Touma and the others are shocked to discover that Calibur is Daichi Kamijo, the previous Kamen Rider Saber while Kento is in distress over not knowing his father's whereabouts. Meanwhile, the Megids strike again and Daichi appears with a new power that makes him a bigger threat.
| 12 | "In That Place Where We Made Our Promise."; Transliteration: "Yakusoku no, Ano Basho de." (Japanese: 約束の、あの場所で。) | Shojiro Nakazawa | Keiichi Hasegawa | November 29, 2020 |
After Rintaro is deeply wounded while protecting him from Daichi, Kento becomes determined to strike the enemy down not only for his sake, but also to avenge his father. Meanwhile, Touma and the others attempt to stop the Megids' plans.
| 13 | "I Will Stick to My Convictions."; Transliteration: "Ore wa, Ore no, Omoi o Tsuranuku." (Japanese: 俺は、俺の、思いを貫く。) | Hidenori Ishida | Takuro Fukuda | December 6, 2020 |
Touma regains all his lost memories and realizes Daichi and the Megids' true objective, which is to recreate the same cataclysmic events of 15 years ago. Determined to stop them and avenge the fallen Kento, he obtains a new power.
| 14 | "These Feelings Dwell in the Sword."; Transliteration: "Kono Omoi, Tsurugi ni Yadoshite." (Japanese: この思い、剣に宿して。) | Hidenori Ishida | Takuro Fukuda | December 13, 2020 |
While Touma defeated Calibur and foiled his plot, Kento has mysteriously disappeared. As the Megids continue to move forward with their own plans, the swordsmen head into battle against them with Kento's sword and Wonder Ride Books as well as a new power for Rintaro.
| 15 | "Beyond the Resolution."; Transliteration: "Kakugo o Koeta, Sono Saki ni." (Japanese: 覚悟を超えた、その先に。) | Koichi Sakamoto | Keiichi Hasegawa | December 20, 2020 |
Touma dives into a portal opened by the pillars of light to stop Calibur while the other swordsmen look for a way to close it despite being warned by the Megids that Touma will not be able to return if they do so.
| 16 | "A Ray of Light That Saves the World."; Transliteration: "Sekai o Sukuu, Hitosuji no Hikari." (Japanese: 世界を救う、一筋の光。) | Koichi Sakamoto | Keiichi Hasegawa | December 27, 2020 |
After defeating Calibur and averting the latest crisis, Touma prepares to celebrate the new year with his friends. However, Sword of Logos member Reika Shindai manipulates the others into believing that Touma is a traitor and turns them against him. While on the run, Touma encounters a man named Yuri, who reveals himself as the Light Swordsman, Kamen Rider Saikou.
| 17 | "Whether the Ancient Messenger Is Light or Shadow."; Transliteration: "Inishie no Shisha wa, Hikari ka Kage ka." (Japanese: 古の使者は、光か影か。) | Satoshi Morota | Nobuhiro Mouri | January 10, 2021 |
Touma is on the run from the Sword of Logos, who have branded him an enemy. However, when the Megids discover a way to turn humans into monsters, a conflicted Touma faces the possibility of killing an innocent to stop the Megids' plans.
| 18 | "Defeating the Megid With a Flaming Tenacity."; Transliteration: "Honō no Shūnen, Megido o Utsu." (Japanese: 炎の執念、メギドを討つ。) | Satoshi Morota | Nobuhiro Mouri | January 17, 2021 |
Touma looks for a way to defeat the Yeti Megid without killing its human host, though Yuri is certain that she is beyond salvation. Meanwhile, the other swordsmen start having doubts about Reika's accusations against Touma.
| 19 | "Flame and Light, Sword and Sword."; Transliteration: "Honō to Hikari, Ken to Ken." (Japanese: 炎と光、剣と剣。) | Hidenori Ishida | Takuro Fukuda | January 24, 2021 |
Several people are disappearing and Reika insists that Touma is involved in it, ordering the other swordsmen to fight him. While Touma and Yuri conduct their own investigation into the matter, the Megids turn another person into a monster.
| 20 | "The Will of the Sword to Destroy the Stronghold."; Transliteration: "Gajō o Kuzusu, Ken no Ishi." (Japanese: 牙城を崩す、剣の意志。) | Hidenori Ishida | Takuro Fukuda | January 31, 2021 |
Following his duel with Touma, Tetsuo informs his fellow swordsmen that the Megids have discovered a way to turn humans into monsters, but Reika deflects the issue by telling Ren that Touma still has Kento's sword. Amidst the incensed ninja's attempts to take his idol's sword back from him and attacks by the Megid warrior Desast, Touma attempts to help the Megids' latest victim, who keeps changing back and forth between his human and monstrous forms.
| 21 | "Shine Brightest in Full Color."; Transliteration: "Saikō ni Kagayake, Furu Karā." (Japanese: 最高に輝け、全身全色(フルカラー)。) | Teruaki Sugihara | Keiichi Hasegawa | February 7, 2021 |
Touma and Yuri continue looking for the people who disappeared. While Yuri decides to regain his lost powers as a swordsman, Tetsuo confronts Touma directly to test if he is capable of unlocking the true power of the Kaenken Rekka.
| 22 | "Even So, I Still Want to Save People."; Transliteration: "Sore demo, Hito o Sukuitai." (Japanese: それでも、人を救いたい。) | Teruaki Sugihara | Keiichi Hasegawa | February 14, 2021 |
After rescuing a young woman from the Charybdis Megid, Touma learns that her sister is still missing. Fearing that she is still under the Megids' influence, Touma looks for her, but Ryo stands in his way in another attempt to confiscate his swords and Wonder Ride Books.
| 23 | "The Raging Hand of Destruction."; Transliteration: "Arekuruu, Hakai no Te." (Japanese: 荒れ狂う、破壊の手。) | Takayuki Shibasaki | Nobuhiro Mouri | February 21, 2021 |
To set things straight with the Sword of Logos, Touma decides to break into Southern Base to meet their leader, the elusive Master Logos. Little does he know that Storius also intends to invade it to claim the organization's forbidden tome. In the chaos of battle, Touma ends up acquiring the tome, which transforms into the unstable Primitive Dragon Wonder Ride Book. Possessed by its overwhelming power, a feral Touma viciously defeats Legeiel in combat before collapsing from exhaustion.
| 24 | "Father's Back Bearing the Future."; Transliteration: "Chichi no Senaka, Seotta Mirai." (Japanese: 父の背中、背負った未来。) | Takayuki Shibasaki | Nobuhiro Mouri | February 28, 2021 |
Both Touma's allies and enemies are astonished by the unknown and uncontrollable power of Primitive Dragon. Reika orders Rintaro to steal the book from Touma, even if he needs to kill him, but Ryo decides to finally confront Reika about her true intentions. In the midst of this, a new Calibur enters the fray to save Touma from Primitive Dragon's influence.
| 25 | "The Crimson Assassin Enveloped in Smoke."; Transliteration: "Kemuri o Matoishi, Shinku no Shikaku." (Japanese: 煙をまといし、真紅の刺客。) | Kazuya Kamihoriuchi | Takuro Fukuda | March 7, 2021 |
Touma desperately looks for a way to contain the overwhelming power of Primitive Dragon before he ends up killing someone. Meanwhile, Reika grows tired of Ryo and Tetsuo's disobedience and decides to use her own powers as a Kamen Rider to eliminate them.
| 26 | "Deep Darkness With a Sword."; Transliteration: "Fukaki Yami, Ken to Tomo ni." (Japanese: 深き闇、剣と共に。) | Kazuya Kamihoriuchi | Takuro Fukuda | March 14, 2021 |
Much to everybody's surprise, Kento reappears and assumes his father's mantle as Kamen Rider Calibur, affirming that the only way to protect the world from destruction is by sealing all the sacred swords. Despite Kento's decision, Touma attempts to reason with him, only to learn the harsh truth behind his motives.
| 27 | "Turning Sorrow into a Smile."; Transliteration: "Kanashimi o, Egao ni Kaete." (Japanese: 哀しみを、笑顔に変えて。) | Koichi Sakamoto | Keiichi Hasegawa | March 21, 2021 |
Touma attempts to rescue the boy he saw in his dreams from the deep sadness he is engulfed by. Meanwhile, Legeiel evolves into a new and powerful form, determined to have his revenge against Saber. In the midst of their fight, Touma learns the boy is a physical representation of Primitive Dragon who had lost all of their friends. Touma befriends it, promising he will never abandon it. In the process, he tames Primitive Dragon and acquires the Elemental Dragon Wonder Ride Book. Combining the two books, Touma transforms into Saber Elemental Primitive Dragon and destroys Legeiel, freeing his human soul.
| 28 | "Writing the Past, Drawing the Future."; Transliteration: "Shirusu Kako, Egaku Mirai." (Japanese: 記す過去、描く未来。) | Koichi Sakamoto | Keiichi Hasegawa | March 28, 2021 |
Ren leaves the Sword of Logos, determined to join forces with Kento. However, the latter decides to not accept Ren's help and proceeds to seal his sword instead when Touma appears to stop him.
| 29 | "At That Moment, the Swordsman Made His Move."; Transliteration: "Sono Toki, Kenshi ga Ugoita." (Japanese: その時、剣士が動いた。) | Koichi Sakamoto | Keiichi Hasegawa | April 4, 2021 |
Rintaro decides to confront Master Logos for the truth about his intentions, but must first contend with his leader's right hand Ryoga Shindai, aka Kamen Rider Durendal.
| 30 | "Even When Bonds Are Torn Apart."; Transliteration: "Kizuna, Kirisakarete mo." (Japanese: 絆、切り裂かれても。) | Hidenori Ishida | Takuro Fukuda | April 11, 2021 |
Having discovered the truth about Master Logos, Rintaro rejoins Touma and the other Northern Base swordsmen. Seeing this, Mei considers how she can contribute to their fight. However, the Megids turn her into a monster bent on destroying Rintaro. Upon discovering this, Rintaro and Touma are faced with the dire crisis of whether they can save her or not.
| 31 | "Strength to Trust, Strength to Believe in." Transliteration: "Shinjiru Tsuyosa, Shinjirareru Tsuyosa." (Japanese: 信じる強さ、信じられる強さ。) | Hidenori Ishida | Takuro Fukuda | April 18, 2021 |
An ashamed Rintaro flees from the Northern Base after failing to protect Mei from the Megids. Faced with the fear of losing his friend, Touma confronts the enemy alone to rescue her, but Zooous stands in his way to prevent him.
| 32 | "My Feelings Crystallized."; Transliteration: "Boku no Omoi, Kesshō to Narite." (Japanese: 僕の想い、結晶となりて。) | Teruaki Sugihara | Hiroki Uchida | April 25, 2021 |
After saving Mei, Rintaro's confidence is restored. However, Master Logos destroys the barrier protecting the Northern Base, leading to the Shindai siblings and the Megids launching simultaneous attacks on it. The remaining Northern Base swordsmen are forced to split up to tackle these situations, with Touma and Yuri fighting the Shindais while Rintaro and Ryo battle the Megids. Taking advantage of the siege, an evolved Zooous intends to settle his rivalry with the former. However, Rintaro gains the Tategami Hyoujuu Senki Wonder Ride Book from the Northern Base's Tome of Omniscience and transforms into his strongest form yet to defeat Zooous once and for all.
| 33 | "Even So, the Future Can Be Changed."; Transliteration: "Sore demo, Mirai wa Kaerareru." (Japanese: それでも、未来は変えられる。) | Teruaki Sugihara | Hiroki Uchida | May 2, 2021 |
Despite Rintaro's new power, Reika succeeds in stealing Ryo and Tetsuo's swords as well as Kento's original sword as Master Logos' plan calls for all of the Riders' swords to be gathered. While the swordsmen move to protect Ren, Touma approaches Kento and attempts to convince him to return to the Northern Base. However, Kento reveals he saw visions of the world's destruction and of Touma dying while saving it, along with his determination to avert these possible futures. Suddenly, Master Logos appears before the duo, determined to steal their swords himself.
| 34 | "The Immortal Swordsman Awakens."; Transliteration: "Me o Samasu, Fushi no Kenshi." (Japanese: 目を覚ます、不死の剣士。) | Satoshi Morota | Keiichi Hasegawa | May 9, 2021 |
Touma and the others rejoice upon learning that Luna is still alive, but Master Logos uses the Book of Ruin to revive the Immortal Swordsman, Bahato, and sends him to fight the Northern Base swordsmen once more.
| 35 | "And I Will Become a God."; Transliteration: "Soshite Watashi wa, Kami ni Naru." (Japanese: そして私は、神になる。) | Satoshi Morota | Keiichi Hasegawa | May 16, 2021 |
While protecting Touma from Kento and Bahato, Yuri vanishes. Luna appears during the battle, but is kidnapped by Reika, who prepares the stolen swords and Wonder Ride Books for a ritual that will allow Master Logos to become a god. After fainting from his injuries, Touma witnesses his friends locked in battle against Master Logos and Bahato and attempts to join them. In the process, he reacquires the Emotional Dragon Wonder Ride Book and uses it to defeat Bahato.
| 36 | "The Power of the Almighty Is Opened."; Transliteration: "Hirakareru, Zenchizen'nō no Chikara." (Japanese: 開かれる、全知全能の力。) | Hiroki Kashiwagi | Nobuhiro Mouri | May 23, 2021 |
Having reclaimed their swords and books thanks to Touma, the swordsmen and a revived Yuri join forces to rescue Luna and stop Master Logos' plans. Meanwhile, Reika and Ryoga learn their master's true colors and decide to oppose him. Ultimately, the swordsmen succeed in saving Luna, interrupting the ritual, and regaining their powers, with Kento choosing to retain the Calibur title instead of re-taking up the Raimeiken Ikazuchi to honor his father's legacy. However, their victory is short-lived when Logos succeeds in obtaining the Caladbolg sword, the Omni Force Wonder Ride Book, and his own Rider powers.
| 37 | "Who Will Change the Future?"; Transliteration: "Mirai o Kaeru no wa, Dare da." (Japanese: 未来を変えるのは、誰だ。) | Hiroki Kashiwagi | Nobuhiro Mouri | May 30, 2021 |
Isaac, formerly Master Logos, declares war on humanity and sets out to refine his already incredible power further. To stop him, Kento is determined to sacrifice himself in Touma's place. Touma and Rintaro attempt to stop him, but Ren appears in their way, challenging the former to a duel.
| 38 | "The Galactic Sword That Unites the Seiken."; Transliteration: "Seiken o Tabaneru, Ginga no Tsurugi." (Japanese: 聖剣を束ねる、銀河の剣。) | Takayuki Shibasaki | Hiroki Uchida | June 6, 2021 |
Despite the united swordsmen's best efforts, Isaac continues his plot to destroy the world, causing them to look to Touma for answers. Meanwhile, Touma prevents Kento from sacrificing himself and hands him his original sword, but Kento refuses to use it. Suddenly, Bahato challenges Touma once more, but the latter acquires a new power that just may turn the tide of battle in his and his allies' favor.
| 39 | "Swordsmen, Follow the Path You Believe in." Transliteration: "Kenshi yo, Shinjiru Michi o Ike." (Japanese: 剣士よ、信じる道を行け。) | Takayuki Shibasaki | Hiroki Uchida | June 13, 2021 |
After receiving Luna's help in creating the Haouken Xross Saber, Touma has destroyed Isaac's books and restored sections of the city previously thought to have been gone forever. However, Isaac continues to further his plans, leading to the possibility that he wanted Touma to create the new Seiken. Meanwhile, despite fighting Isaac alongside the Northern Base swordsmen, the Shindais, Ren, and Kento decide to forge their own paths independently of them.
| 40 | "The Shining Friendship of Three Swordsmen."; Transliteration: "Kagayaku Yūjō, San Kenshi." (Japanese: 輝く友情、三剣士。) | Hidenori Ishida | Keiichi Hasegawa | June 20, 2021 |
Using Omni Force's ability to control Wonder Ride Books, Isaac takes control of Ryoga via his book and forces him to attack Reika. Isaac then targets Luna once more due to her connecting Earth to Wonder World despite Tassel's best efforts to protect her. Touma, Rintaro, and Kento unite to protect Luna and defeat Isaac for good. However, Storius takes advantage of the situation to personally kill the former Master Logos and steal the Omni Force Wonder Ride Book for himself.
| 41 | "A Wish Composed Over Two Thousand Years."; Transliteration: "Nisen-nen, Tsuzurareta Negai." (Japanese: 二千年、綴られた願い。) | Hidenori Ishida | Keiichi Hasegawa | June 27, 2021 |
Isaac has fallen, though Storious has taken over their plan to end the world while Desast opposes him. Meanwhile, Tassel appears before Touma and the swordsmen to reveal the origins of Wonder World, the Megids, and the Almighty Book in order to influence how Touma will decide his story's ending.
| 42 | "The Beginning of a Beautiful Ending."; Transliteration: "Hajimaru, Utsukushī Owari." (Japanese: はじまる、美しい終わり。) | Kazuya Kamihoriuchi | Takuro Fukuda | July 4, 2021 |
Touma learns he is slowly vanishing as a result of his increasing power as Saber, which aligns with one of Kento's visions. Despite this, the latter continues on, intending to determine his story's ending himself. To do so, he needs Luna, who Tassel has been searching for, only to encounter Storious instead. Meanwhile, Ren continues his search for true strength while Desast, having become immortal after assuming Bahato's Rider powers, challenges Touma to a duel.
| 43 | "A Clash of the Value of Existence."; Transliteration: "Gekitotsu, Sonzai Suru Kachi." (Japanese: 激突、存在する価値。) | Kazuya Kamihoriuchi | Takuro Fukuda | July 11, 2021 |
After killing Tassel and stealing his book, Storious begins a ritual to restore the Tome of Omniscience before he begins destroying Earth and Wonder World. Touma and the swordsmen succeed in slowing the Megid's progress, but a prophecy reveals Touma is necessary for Storious' plans. Despite this, Touma works to recover Tassel's book and stop Storious. Meanwhile, Ren accepts Desast's challenge for a duel.
| SP | "The World Pirate is Coming, Intersecting Worlds."; Transliteration: "Kaizoku Kitarite, Majiwaru Sekai." (Japanese: 界賊来たりて、交わる世界。) | Satoshi Morota | Nobuhiro Mouri | July 18, 2021 |
Touma, Rintaro, and Kento encounter a strange monster called Orihime World along with a "World Pirate" called Zocks Goldtsuiker. Despite initial difficulties and Zocks antagonizing the Shindais while attempting to take a souvenir, the Riders eventually work with the pirate to destroy Orihime World. As Zocks takes his leave, he steals the Ocean History Wonder Ride Book, leading to the Shindais pursuing him to an alternate universe. This episode begins a crossover event that concludes on Kikai Sentai Zenkaiger episode 20. Additionally, as part of the Movie Release Commemorative Combo Special (映画公開記念合体スペシャル, Eiga Kōkai Kinen Gattai Supesharu), the crossover also serves as a tie-in to the crossover film Saber + Zenkaiger: Super Hero Senki.
| 44 | "The Last Page Is Opened."; Transliteration: "Hiraku, Saigo no Pēji." (Japanese: 開く、最後のページ。) | Teruaki Sugihara | Keiichi Hasegawa | August 1, 2021 |
Storious creates the Grimoire Wonder Ride Book using Legeiel, Zooous, Isaac, Tassel, and Charybdis' powers along with the Tome of Omniscience and reanimates the Sword of Logos' Four Sages to serve him. Meanwhile, despite struggling to stop Wonder World's collapse, Touma and his fellow swordsmen must face Storious if they hope to save the world.
| 45 | "Ten Swordsmen With the World on the Line."; Transliteration: "Jukkenshi, Sekai o Kakete." (Japanese: 十剣士、世界を賭けて。) | Teruaki Sugihara | Keiichi Hasegawa | August 8, 2021 |
As Storious' plan progresses and Wonder World and Earth collapse, the swordsmen are unexpectedly joined by Sophia as the latest Calibur as well as Luna and Mei. With their forces bolstered, the swordsmen face Storious and his army.
| 46 | "Farewell, My Hero."; Transliteration: "Sayōnara, Watashi no Eiyū." (Japanese: さようなら、私の英雄。) | Hidenori Ishida | Keiichi Hasegawa | August 15, 2021 |
One by one, the swordsmen fall for one reason or another as Storious overwhelms them. Touma attempts to face him alone, but learns a horrible truth regarding the Almighty Book. Meanwhile, as Wonder World vanishes and Earth collapses, a vanishing Mei reaches a decision as she attempts to reach a similarly vanishing Luna.
| 47 | "The End of the World, the Birth of a Story."; Transliteration: "Owaru Sekai, Umareru Monogatari." (Japanese: 終わる世界、生まれる物語。) | Hidenori Ishida | Keiichi Hasegawa | August 22, 2021 |
Luna sacrifices herself to give Touma and his friends the power to defeat Storious. While they fail to stop the destruction of Earth and Wonder World, Mei's initiative and his readers inspire Touma to bring forth a miracle.
| Special–Issue | "When a New Page Is Opened,"; Transliteration: "Aratana Pēji ga, Hiraku Toki," (Japanese: 新たなページが、開くとき、) | Hidenori Ishida | Hiroki Uchida | August 29, 2021 |
After saving Earth and Wonder World together, Touma and his friends enjoy a well-deserved rest and begin to go their separate ways. However, their peaceful days are interrupted by a strange monster they have never encountered before known as a Deadman along with a boy and his demon partner capable of transforming into Kamen Rider Revice, accompanied by their associate George Karizaki, who are hunting the cult the Deadman belongs to.
