= Goblin (voice actor) =

Japanese narrator and impressionist (born 1964)

- Born: Tenetsu Saijō; October 28, 1964 (age 61); Hachinohe, Aomori, Japan
- Occupations: Narrator, impressionist

Tenetsu Saijō (最上典悦, Saijō Tenetsu; born October 28, 1964), better known by his stage name of Goblin (ゴブリン, Goburin), is a Japanese narrator and impressionist from Hachinohe, Aomori. He is currently attached to Office Osawa; he was previously attached to the Tokyo Actor's Consumer's Cooperative Society, Jinsei Pro, and Across Entertainment. His impression repertoire includes the likes of Naoto Takenaka, Masayuki Suzuki, Hiroshi Kamayatsu, Yūzō Kayama and Akira Fuse.

== Roles ==
=== Narration ===
- Kagaijugyō: Ryōko Moriyama Edition
- Thrill Nayoru
- Kikai Sentai Zenkaiger

=== Television animation ===
- Hajime no Ippo: New Challenger (Episode #26)

=== Video games ===
- Suikoden V (Orok, Chuck, Tsuvaik, Boss Wild)

=== Other ===
- The Best Ten (George Tokoro impression)
