= Kikai Sentai Zenkaiger =

Japanese television drama

- Genre: Tokusatsu; Crossover fiction Comedy; Action-adventure; Superhero; Science-fantasy
- Created by: Saburo Yatsude (original story); Shotaro Ishinomori (special thanks)
- Written by: Junko Kōmura; Nobuhiro Mouri; Saburo Yatsude
- Directed by: Shojiro Nakazawa; Hiroyuki Kato; Ryuta Tasaki; Kyohei Yamaugchi; Katsuya Watanabe; Satoshi Morota
- Starring: Kiita Komagine; Atsuki Mashiko; Ryo Sekoguchi; Hinami Mori; Ikue Sakakibara
- Voices of: Shintarō Asanuma; Yuki Kaji; Yume Miyamoto; Takuya Satō; Misato Fukuen; Ryōta Suzuki; Satsumi Matsuda; Jouji Nakata; Kenji Nomura; Masanori Takeda; Tatsuhisa Suzuki; Masaya Fukunishi
- Narrated by: Goblin
- Opening theme: "Zenryoku Zenkai! Zenkaiger" by Takeshi Tsuruno
- Composers: Chumei Watanabe; Kenichiro Oishi
- Country of origin: Japan
- Original language: Japanese
- No. of episodes: 49 (list of episodes)

Production
- Producers: Chihiro Inoue (TV Asahi); Shinichiro Shirakura (Toei); Naomi Takebe (Toei); Kōichi Yada (Toei Advertising); Akihiro Fukada (Toei Advertising)
- Production location: Tokyo, Japan (Greater Tokyo Area)
- Running time: 24–25 minutes
- Production companies: TV Asahi; Toei Company; Toei Advertising

Original release
- Network: ANN (TV Asahi)
- Release: March 7, 2021 – February 27, 2022

Related
- Mashin Sentai Kiramager; Avataro Sentai Donbrothers

Kikai Sentai Zenkaiger (機界戦隊ゼンカイジャー, Kikai Sentai Zenkaijā; Mecha World Squadron Zenkaiger) is a Japanese tokusatsu television series, the 45th entry in Toei's long-running Super Sentai series, and the second produced in the Reiwa era. Additionally, it commemorates the 45th anniversary of the Super Sentai franchise and is the second special anniversary series following Kaizoku Sentai Gokaiger.

The show succeeded Mashin Sentai Kiramager, joining Kamen Rider Saber, and later, Kamen Rider Revice in the Super Hero Time line-up on TV Asahi on March 7, 2021. The show's name comes from the titular team's catchphrase, "Zenryoku Zenkai" (全力全開; "full throttle"). A direct sequel, titled Avataro Sentai Donbrothers, aired following the finale.

== Plot ==
One month ago, a strange phenomenon suddenly fused the human world with the parallel world of Kikaitopia, who had previously conquered and sealed off various universes, including those of the previous 44 Super Sentai. Despite this, humans and Kikainoids quickly get along and live peacefully together.

In the present, however, their lives are threatened by Kikaitopia's evil rulers, the Tozitend Dynasty, who seek to conquer all parallel worlds. To face this new threat, a brave and energetic young man named Kaito Goshikida inherits the powers of all previous Super Sentai. Transforming into Zenkaizer, he joins forces with the Kikainoids Juran, Gaon, Magine, and Vroon to save the multiverse from Tozitend and find Kaito's missing parents as the Zenkaigers. The conflict later intensifies with the arrival of the World Pirates. Led by Zocks Goldtsuiker, who can transform into Twokaizer, the World Pirates oppose Tozitend in pursuit of their own objectives and occasionally ally with the Zenkaigers for the sake of it.

== Episodes ==
No.	English title Original Japanese title	Directed by	Written by	Original release date
1	"The Machine World Is Mysterious!"; Transliteration: "Kikai Sekai wa Kikikaikai!" (Japanese: キカイ世界はキキカイカイ！)	Shojiro Nakazawa	Junko Kōmura	March 7, 2021
2	"The Roaring Beast Is Troublesome!"; Transliteration: "Gao na Yajū ga Goyakkai!" (Japanese: ガオな野獣がごやっかい！)	Shojiro Nakazawa	Junko Kōmura	March 14, 2021
3	"The Seriously Nununu Witch!"; Transliteration: "Maji de Nu'nu'nu na Mahōtsukai!" (Japanese: マジでぬぬぬな魔法使い！)	Ryuta Tasaki	Junko Kōmura	March 21, 2021
4	"The Trembling Big Meddler!"; Transliteration: "Buruburu Dekkai Osekkai!" (Japanese: ブルブルでっかいおせっかい！)	Ryuta Tasaki	Junko Kōmura	March 28, 2021
5	"Make Sushi or Be Made into Sushi, a Sushi Tournament!"; Transliteration: "Nigiri Nigirare Sushi Taikai!" (Japanese: 握り握られスシ大会！)	Satoshi Morota	Junko Kōmura	April 4, 2021
6	"The Unpleasant and Incomprehensible Garbage Treatment!"; Transliteration: "Fukai Fukakai Gomi Atsukai!" (Japanese: 不快不可解ゴミあつかい！)	Satoshi Morota	Junko Kōmura	April 11, 2021
7	"The Prince of the Demon World Is Short-Tempered!"; Transliteration: "Makai no Ōji wa Ki ga Mijikai!" (Japanese: 魔界の王子は気がみじかい！)	Kyohei Yamaguchi	Junko Kōmura	April 18, 2021
8	"Going Door to Door to Another World?!"; Transliteration: "Doa Tu Doa de Bessekai?!" (Japanese: ドアtoドアで別世界?!)	Kyohei Yamaguchi	Junko Kōmura	April 25, 2021
9	"World Pirates, Delightful and Thrilling!"; Transliteration: "Sekai Kaizoku, Yukai Tsūkai!" (Japanese: 世界海賊、愉快ツーカイ！)	Shojiro Nakazawa	Junko Kōmura	May 2, 2021
10	"Blue Skies Day and Night!"; Transliteration: "Ohiru mo Yoru demo Burū Sukai!" (Japanese: お昼も夜でもブルースカイ！)	Shojiro Nakazawa	Junko Kōmura	May 9, 2021
11	"Everyone's Playing Tag?!"; Transliteration: "Wataru Seken wa Onigokko kai?!" (Japanese: 渡る世間は鬼ゴッコかい?!)	Ryuta Tasaki	Junko Kōmura	May 16, 2021
12	"Slow Snail, Hard Shell!"; Transliteration: "Noronoro Maimai, Katai Kai!" (Japanese: ノロノロマイマイ、カタい貝！)	Ryuta Tasaki	Junko Kōmura	May 23, 2021
13	"Recycling Once Again!"; Transliteration: "Risaikuru Surya Mō Ikkai!" (Japanese: リサイクルすりゃもう一回！)	Hiroyuki Katō	Junko Kōmura	May 30, 2021
14	"Duel! Zenkai vs. Twokai!"; Transliteration: "Kettō! Zenkai Tai Tsūkai!" (Japanese: 決闘！ゼンカイVSツーカイ！)	Hiroyuki Katō	Junko Kōmura	June 6, 2021
15	"Gachon! A Sharp Turn into Retro!"; Transliteration: "Gachōn! Retoro ni Kyū Senkai!" (Japanese: ガチョーン！レトロに急旋回！)	Shojiro Nakazawa	Junko Kōmura	June 13, 2021
16	"It's a Magnet at Its Limit!"; Transliteration: "Jishaku Shaku da ze Mō Genkai!" (Japanese: 磁石シャクだぜ もう限界！)	Shojiro Nakazawa	Junko Kōmura	June 20, 2021
17	"Nunu, Occult Club!"; Transliteration: "Nunutto Okaruto Dōkōkai!" (Japanese: ぬぬっとオカルト同好会！)	Kyohei Yamaguchi	Junko Kōmura	June 27, 2021
18	"Life Is Short, Fall in Love at Full Throttle!"; Transliteration: "Inochi Mijikashi, Koi Seyo Zenkai!" (Japanese: いのち短し、恋せよゼンカイ！)	Kyohei Yamaguchi	Junko Kōmura	July 4, 2021
19	"Zenkai Change, Super Zenkai!"; Transliteration: "Zenkai Aratame, Chō Zenkai!" (Japanese: ゼンカイ改め、超ゼンカイ！)	Hiroyuki Katō	Junko Kōmura	July 11, 2021
20	"Swordsman and World Pirate, a Brother's Promise."; Transliteration: "Kenshi to Kaizoku, Ani no Chikai." (Japanese: 剣士と界賊、兄の誓い。)	Satoshi Morota	Nobuhiro Mouri	July 18, 2021
21	"Giant Monster of Great Destruction!"; Transliteration: "Dai Kaijū no Dai Hakai!" (Japanese: 大カイジュウの大破壊！)	Hiroyuki Katō	Junko Kōmura	August 1, 2021
22	"Let's Have a Bullfighting Party!"; Transliteration: "Ushishi na Mōretsu Tōgyūkai!" (Japanese: ウシシなモ～れつ闘牛会！)	Katsuya Watanabe	Junko Kōmura	August 8, 2021
23	"Three Great Combinations, the Biggest Battle on Earth!"; Transliteration: "San Dai Gattai Chikyū Saidai no Tatakai!" (Japanese: 三大合体 地球最大の戦い！)	Katsuya Watanabe	Junko Kōmura	August 15, 2021
24	"Invasion Complete! Can We Take It Back?!"; Transliteration: "Shinryaku Kanryō! Dekiru ka Dakkai?!" (Japanese: 侵略完了！できるか奪回？！)	Kyohei Yamaguchi	Junko Kōmura	August 22, 2021
25	"Do It Over! Zenkaiger Revised!"; Transliteration: "Yarinaose! Zenkaijā Kai!" (Japanese: やり直せ！ゼンカイジャー・改！)	Kyohei Yamaguchi	Saburo Yatsude	August 29, 2021
26	"The Remodeled Prince and the Dark Surgeon!"; Transliteration: "Kaizō Ōji to Yami no Gekai!" (Japanese: 改造王子と闇の外科医！)	Shojiro Nakazawa	Junko Kōmura	September 5, 2021
27	"A Great Voyage Through Seven Worlds!"; Transliteration: "Nana-tsu no Sekai o Dai Kōkai!" (Japanese: 7つのセカイを大航海！)	Shojiro Nakazawa	Junko Kōmura	September 12, 2021
28	"Weekly Shonen Manga World of Great Illustrations!"; Transliteration: "Shūkan Shōnen Manga Warudo Dai Zukai!" (Japanese: 週刊少年マンガワルド大図解！)	Hiroyuki Katō	Junko Kōmura	September 19, 2021
29	"Do You Know the Prince's Aim?"; Transliteration: "Ōji no Nerai, Shitteiru kai?" (Japanese: 王子のねらい、知っているかい？)	Hiroyuki Katō	Junko Kōmura	September 26, 2021
30	"Is the Machine Next Door Persimmon-Eating Destruction?!"; Transliteration: "Tonari no Kikai wa Kaki Kū Hakai?!" (Japanese: 隣のキカイはカキ食うハカイ？！)	Katsuya Watanabe	Junko Kōmura	October 3, 2021
31	"Full Combination! New Release!"; Transliteration: "Gyūtto Gattai! Nyūtto Kōkai!" (Japanese: ギュウっと合体！NEWっと公開！)	Katsuya Watanabe	Junko Kōmura	October 10, 2021
32	"Sakasama Gets Angry! Is That a Monkey?"; Transliteration: "Ikaru Sakasama! Masaka Saru kai?" (Japanese: 怒るサカサマ！まさかサルかい？)	Kyohei Yamaguchi	Junko Kōmura	October 17, 2021
33	"Great Teacher Demon Master!"; Transliteration: "Gurēto Tīchā Onizukai!" (Japanese: グレートティーチャー鬼使い！)	Kyohei Yamaguchi	Junko Kōmura	October 24, 2021
34	"The Pumpkin Capturing Contest!"; Transliteration: "Kabocha wo Tori Tori Kyōgikai!" (Japanese: カボチャをトリトリ競技会！)	Shojiro Nakazawa	Junko Kōmura	October 31, 2021
35	"Diamond ♦ Delight?!"; Transliteration: "Daiyamondo Yukai?!" (Japanese: ダイヤモンド♦ユカイ？！)	Shojiro Nakazawa	Junko Kōmura	November 14, 2021
36	"The Surprisingly Shocking Great Kidnapping!"; Transliteration: "Bikkuri Dokkiri Dai Yūkai!" (Japanese: ビックリどっきり大ユーカイ！)	Hiroyuki Katō	Junko Kōmura	November 21, 2021
37	"Grudge Radish, Deep Roots!"; Transliteration: "Urami Daikon, Ne ga Fukai!" (Japanese: 恨みダイコン、根が深い！)	Hiroyuki Katō	Junko Kōmura	November 28, 2021
38	"It's the Ancestors! The Great Spirit World"; Transliteration: "Gosenzosama da yo! Dai Reikai" (Japanese: ご先祖様だョ！大霊界)	Katsuya Watanabe	Junko Kōmura	December 5, 2021
39	"Happy Birthday to Infinite New Year's!"; Transliteration: "Mugen Akeome Tanjōkai!" (Japanese: 無限あけおめ誕生会！)	Katsuya Watanabe	Junko Kōmura	December 12, 2021
40	"Dad's Rescue, One Chance!"; Transliteration: "Tōchan Dakkai, Wanchan Ikkai!" (Japanese: とーちゃん奪回、ワンチャン一回！)	Katsuya Watanabe	Junko Kōmura	December 19, 2021
41	"The Noodle Rabbit Hole Goes Deep!"; Transliteration: "Oshimen Numa wa Tsurutsuru Fukai!" (Japanese: 推しメン沼はつるつる深い！)	Ryuta Tasaki	Junko Kōmura	December 26, 2021
42	"A New Hero! A Covert Kotatsu Meeting!!"; Transliteration: "Shin Hīrō nya! Okota no Mikkai!!" (Japanese: 新ヒーローにゃ！おコタの密会!!)	Ryuta Tasaki	Junko Kōmura	January 9, 2022
43	"The Weathercock's Head Is Directly Opposite the Wind!"; Transliteration: "Kazamidori no Atama wa Kaze no Mamukai!" (Japanese: 風見鶏の頭は風の真向かい！)	Kyohei Yamaguchi	Junko Kōmura	January 16, 2022
44	"SD = Small + Deformed?!"; Transliteration: "Esu Dī wa Sumōru Tasu Dekkai?!" (Japanese: SD＝スモール+デッカい？！)	Kyohei Yamaguchi	Junko Kōmura	January 23, 2022
45	"Super Bad Luck Is the Lowest Fortune?!"; Transliteration: "Chō Daikyōtte Unsei Saikai?!" (Japanese: 超大凶って運勢最下位？！)	Hiroyuki Katō	Junko Kōmura	January 30, 2022
46	"A Little God Who Jumped Out!"; Transliteration: "Gegetto Tobideta Kami no Chokkai!" (Japanese: ゲゲっと飛び出た神のちょっかい！)	Hiroyuki Katō	Junko Kōmura	February 6, 2022
47	"Enter the Palace! Stand Tall Before the Boss!"; Transliteration: "Paresu Totsu'nyū! Bosu no Mae demo Zu ga Takai!" (Japanese: パレス突入！ボスの前でも頭が高い！)	Shojiro Nakazawa	Junko Kōmura	February 13, 2022
48	"Heaven's Vengeance Is Slow but Sure, the Fall of the Dynasty!"; Transliteration: "Tenmōkaikai, Ōchō Hōkai!" (Japanese: 天網恢々、王朝崩壊！)	Shojiro Nakazawa	Junko Kōmura	February 20, 2022
49 (Final)	"My World, Everyone's World"; Transliteration: "Ore no Sekai, Min'na no Sekai" (Japanese: 俺の世界、みんなのセカイ)	Shojiro Nakazawa	Junko Kōmura	February 27, 2022

== Production ==
The trademark for the series was filed by Toei Company on September 8, 2020.

According to producer Shinichiro Shirakura, the show's diversity in its titular members, featuring a human and four Kikainoids, is due to the Super Sentai series' recurring themes of diversity in its group of protagonists while maintaining strong characters. The reason why Zenkaizer was chosen as the leader despite being colored white is to ensure that he would stand out in future crossovers when grouped alongside other red warriors. The four Kikainoids' warrior forms were based on the mecha of previous Super Sentai series. Zenkai Zyuran was based on Kyōryū Sentai Zyuranger mecha Daizyujin, Zenkai Gaon was based on Hyakujuu Sentai Gaoranger mecha Gao King, Zenkai Magine was based on Mahō Sentai Magiranger mecha Magi King, and Zenkai Vroom was based on GoGo Sentai Boukenger mecha DaiBouken. Although Zenkaiger is open to the idea of featuring past heroes in certain episodes, Shirakura mentioned that it will not be done in a similar way to Kaizoku Sentai Gokaiger. As members of the Zenkaigers combine to form the series' mecha, ZenkaiOh, the original plan was for their combined forms to appear human-sized at first, but as the show needed to keep up with the toy releases, this idea was scrapped and eventually implemented in the sequel series Avataro Sentai Donbrothers through the titular group's mecha, Don Onitaijin.

After series voice actor Tatsuhisa Suzuki chose to go on hiatus, his role as Gege was rendered voiceless between episodes 21 and 25. Toei later announced Masaya Fukunishi will take over the role of Gege from episode 25 onward.

=== Reception ===
Kikai Sentai Zenkaiger is ranked 19th place in the 2021's "100 Internet Buzzwords" in Japan, held by Nico Nico Pedia and Pixiv Encyclopedia. The physical award is given to Toei's producers of the series, Shinichiro Shirakura, Naomi Takebe, Kōichi Yada and Akihiro Fukada during the award ceremony on December 15, 2021.

== Films & Specials ==
=== Red Battle! All Sentai Great Assemble!! ===
Kikai Sentai Zenkaiger the Movie: Red Battle! All Sentai Great Assemble!! (機界戦隊ゼンカイジャー THE MOVIE 赤い戦い！オール戦隊大集会!!, Kikai Sentai Zenkaijā Za Mūbī Akai Tatakai! Ōru Sentai Daishūkai!!) is a film which serves as the Zenkaigers' official debut and was released in Japanese theaters on February 20, 2021, as part of Super Sentai Movie Ranger 2021 (スーパー戦隊MOVIEレンジャー2021, Sūpā Sentai Mūbī Renjā Nisen-nijū-ichi), alongside Mashin Sentai Kiramager the Movie: Be-Bop Dream and Kishiryu Sentai Ryusoulger Special: Memory of Soulmates. Naoya Makoto, Kei Hosogai, and Jingi Irie reprise their respective roles as Tsuyoshi Kaijo/Akarenger, Basco Ta Jolokia, and Zamigo Delma. Additionally, Megumi Han and Nobutoshi Canna reprise their respective voice roles as Kyuemon Izayoi and Bangray. The events of the film take place between episode 6 of the regular series and the companion web series Kikai Sentai Zenkaiger Spin-Off: Zenkai Red Great Introduction!.

=== Super Hero Senki ===
Saber + Zenkaiger: Super Hero Senki (セイバー＋ゼンカイジャー スーパーヒーロー戦記, Seibā Zenkaijā Sūpā Hīrō Senki) is a crossover film released on July 22, 2021, starring the cast from Zenkaiger and Kamen Rider Saber, as well as featuring characters from past entries of the franchises involved. The film is part of the celebrations for both the 45th anniversary of the Super Sentai franchise and the 50th anniversary of the Kamen Rider franchise, and serves as the final crossover between them. Actors Fuku Suzuki and Ayumi Tanida portrayed Shotaro Ishinomori and the film's main antagonist, Asmodeus, respectively. Moreover, Kenjirō Ishimaru of Kamen Rider Den-O; Takashi Ukaji of Kamen Rider OOO; So Okuno of Kamen Rider Zi-O; Fumiya Takahashi of Kamen Rider Zero-One; Shogo Suzuki of Samurai Sentai Shinkenger; Atomu Mizuishi of Mashin Sentai Kiramager; and Hiroshi Fujioka of Kamen Rider (1971 - 1973) reprise their respective roles while Naoya Makoto of Himitsu Sentai Gorenger; Toshihiko Seki, Kōji Yusa, Masaki Terasoma, and Kenichi Suzumura of Kamen Rider Den-O; Tetsu Inada of Tokusou Sentai Dekaranger; and M·A·O and Hiroshi Kamiya of Uchu Sentai Kyuranger; and Rikiya Koyama of Kamen Rider Zi-O reprise their respective voice roles. Additionally, the two main characters of the then-upcoming Kamen Rider Revice made their first appearances and a special film for the series was double billed with Super Hero Senki. The events of the film take place between the two-part Movie Release Commemorative Combo Special and episode 21 of the series.

=== Special episodes ===
- Kikai Sentai Zenkaiger Spin-Off: Zenkai Red Great Introduction! (機界戦隊ゼンカイジャー スピンオフ ゼンカイレッド大紹介！, Kikai Sentai Zenkaijā Supin Ofu Zenkai Reddo Daishōkai!) is a two-episode web-exclusive series released on Telasa on March 21, 2021. Additionally, Satomi Hirose of Ninja Sentai Kakuranger makes an appearance. The events of the special take place between Kikai Sentai Zenkaiger the Movie: Red Battle! All Sentai Great Assemble!! and episode 7 of the series.
1. Red Challenge! The Zenkaigers Annihilated?! (赤い挑戦！ゼンカイジャー全壊?!, Akai Chōsen! Zenakaijā Zenkai?!)
2. White Counterattack! Full Recovery of the Zenkaigers!! (白い逆襲！ゼンカイジャー全快!!, Shiroi Gyakushū! Zenakaijā Zenkai!!)
- Zenkai Mini Theater (ゼンカイ豆劇場, Zenkai Mame Gekijō) is a twelve-episode puppetry short series included as part of the Blu-ray releases of Kikai Sentai Zenkaiger.
1. I Learn the Powers of the Predecessors!: Zyuranger Part (パイセンの力、勉強します！〈ジュウレンジャー編〉, Paisen no Chikara, Benkyō Shimasu! Jūrenjā-hen)
2. Can You Name All the Super Sentai? (スーパー戦隊いえるかな？, Sūpā Sentai Ieru ka na?)
3. Miss Magical Girl's Solitary Gourmet (孤高のミス魔女っ子グルメ, Kokō no Misu Majokko Gurume)
4. Suspicions of Hyakujuu Sentai: Gaoranger Part (百獣戦隊の疑惑〈ガオレンジャー編〉, Hyakujū Sentai no Giwaku Gaorenjā-hen)
5. Zenkais of the Wilderness (荒野のゼンカイども, Kōya no Zenkai-domo)
6. Reincarnation Panic! (転生・パニック！, Tensei Panikku!)
7. 5 Seconds Before Getting Seriously Excited: Magiranger Part (マジで高まる5秒前〈マジレンジャー編〉, Maji de Takamaru Go-byō-mae Majirenjā-hen)
8. Sudden Mini Theater (豆劇場は突然に, Mame Gekijō wa Totsuzen ni)
9. Zenkai House Death Game (ゼンカイ館のデスゲーム, Zenkai Yakata no Desu Gēmu)
10. The Endless Inquiry Spirits: Boukenger Part (果てなき探求魂(スピリッツ)〈ボウケンジャー編〉, Hatenaki Tankyū Supirittsu Bōkenjā-hen)
11. It's Good, Mahjong, It's Awesome! (いーじゃん、まーじゃん、すげーじゃん！, Ī jan, Mājan, Sugē jan!)
12. If We Met in Court Again (また法廷で会えたなら, Mata Hōtei de Aeta nara)
- Twokaizer × Gokaiger: The Tanuki-Charmed June Bride (ツーカイザー×ゴーカイジャー ～ジューンブライドはたぬき味～, Tsūkaizā Kakeru Gōkaijā Jūn Buraido wa Tanuki-aji) is a web-exclusive crossover series released on Toei Tokusatsu Fan Club on June 5, 2022, featuring characters from Zenkaiger and Kaizoku Sentai Gokaiger. Ryota Ozawa, Yui Koike, and Junya Ikeda return to reprise their respective roles as Captain Marvelous/Gokai Red, Ahim de Famille/Gokai Pink, and Gai Ikari/Gokai Silver respectively. The events of the specials take place after Zenkaiger vs. Kiramager vs. Senpaiger.

=== V-Cinema ===
==== Zenkaiger vs. Kiramager vs. Senpaiger ====
Kikai Sentai Zenkaiger vs. Kiramager vs. Senpaiger (機界戦隊ゼンカイジャーVSキラメイジャーVSセンパイジャー, Kikai Sentai Zenkaijā Tai Kirameijā Tai Senpaijā) is a V-Cinema release that features a crossover between Zenkaiger and Mashin Sentai Kiramager. The V-Cinema received a limited theatrical release on April 29, 2022, followed by its DVD and Blu-ray release on September 28, 2022. Additionally, Ryota Ozawa of Kaizoku Sentai Gokaiger and Asahi Ito of Kaitou Sentai Lupinranger VS Keisatsu Sentai Patranger reprised their respective roles as Captain Marvelous/Gokai Red and Kairi Yano/Lupin Red. The events of the V-Cinema take place after the final episode of the series.

==== Donbrothers vs. Zenkaiger ====
Avataro Sentai Donbrothers vs. Zenkaiger (暴太郎戦隊ドンブラザーズVSゼンカイジャー, Abatarō Sentai Donburazāzu Tai Zenkaijā) is a V-Cinema release that features a crossover between Zenkaiger and Avataro Sentai Donbrothers. The V-Cinema received a limited theatrical release on May 3, 2023, followed by its DVD and Blu-ray release on September 27, 2023. This film is divided into three acts of the story, focusing on the Donbrothers and Zenkaigers after their respective series, before uniting in the final act. The events of the V-Cinema take place a year after the final episode of Donbrothers.

== Cast ==
- Kaito Goshikida (五色田 介人, Goshikida Kaito): Kiita Komagine (駒木根 葵汰, Komagine Kiita)
- Zocks Goldtsuiker (ゾックス・ゴールドツイカー, Zokkusu Gōrudotsuikā): Atsuki Mashiko (増子 敦貴, Mashiko Atsuki)
- Stacy (ステイシー, Suteishī): Ryo Sekoguchi (世古口 凌, Sekoguchi Ryō)
- Flint Goldtsuiker (フリント・ゴールドツイカー, Furinto Gōrudotsuikā): Hinami Mori (森 日菜美, Mori Hinami)
- Isao Goshikida (五色田 功, Goshikida Isao): Daijiro Kawaoka (川岡 大次郎, Kawaoka Daijirō)
- Mitsuko Goshikida (五色田 美都子, Goshikida Mitsuko): Marie Kai (甲斐 まり恵, Kai Marie)
- Yatsude Goshikida (五色田 ヤツデ, Goshikida Yatsude): Ikue Sakakibara (榊原 郁恵, Sakakibara Ikue)

=== Voice cast ===
- Juran (ジュラン): Shintarō Asanuma (浅沼 晋太郎, Asanuma Shintarō)
- Gaon (ガオーン, Gaōn): Yuki Kaji (梶 裕貴, Kaji Yūki)
- Magine (マジーヌ, Majīnu): Yume Miyamoto (宮本 侑芽, Miyamoto Yume)
- Vroon (ブルーン, Burūn): Takuya Satō (佐藤 拓也, Satō Takuya)
- Secchan (セッちゃん, Setchan): Misato Fukuen (福圓 美里, Fukuen Misato)
- Cutanner Goldtsuiker (カッタナー・ゴールドツイカー, Kattanā Gōrudotsuikā): Ryōta Suzuki (鈴木 崚汰, Suzuki Ryōta)
- Ricky Goldtsuiker (リッキー・ゴールドツイカー, Rikkī Gōrudotsuikā): Satsumi Matsuda (松田 颯水, Matsuda Satsumi)
- Bokkowaus (ボッコワウス, Bokkowausu): Jouji Nakata (中田 譲治, Nakata Jōji)
- Barashitara (バラシタラ): Kenji Nomura (乃村 健次, Nomura Kenji)
- Izirude (イジルデ, Ijirude): Masanori Takeda (竹田 雅則, Takeda Masanori)
- Gege (ゲゲ): Tatsuhisa Suzuki (鈴木 達央, Suzuki Tatsuhisa; 1-21), Masaya Fukunishi (福西 勝也, Fukunishi Masaya; 25-48)
- Narrator: Goblin (ゴブリン, Goburin)
- Geartlinger (ギアトリンガー, Giatoringā): Lenne Hardt
- Geardalinger (ギアダリンガー, Giadaringā): Tomokazu Seki (関 智一, Seki Tomokazu)
- Zenryoku Zenkai Cannon (ゼンリョクゼンカイキャノン, Zenryoku Zenkai Kyanon): Banjō Ginga (銀河 万丈, Ginga Banjō)

=== Guest cast ===
- Reika Shindai (神代 玲花, Shindai Reika; 20): Mei Angela (アンジェラ 芽衣, Anjera Mei)
- Ryoga Shindai (神代 凌牙, Shindai Ryōga; 20): Ken Shonozaki (庄野崎 謙, Shōnozaki Ken)
- Don Momotaro (ドンモモタロウ, Don Momotarō; Voice; 42): Kouhei Higuchi (樋口 幸平, Higuchi Kōhei) (Note: Kouhei Higuchi is credited as ???.)

== Theme song ==
- "Zenryoku Zenkai! Zenkaiger" (全力全開！ゼンカイジャー, Zenryoku Zenkai! Zenkaijā; "Full Throttle! Zenkaiger")
  - Lyrics: Mike Sugiyama (マイク スギヤマ, Maiku Sugiyama)
  - Composition & Arrangement: Kentaro Sonoda (園田 健太郎, Sonoda Kentarō)
  - Artist: Takeshi Tsuruno (つるの 剛士, Tsuruno Takeshi)
  - Chorus: Kotonomi Children's Chorus (ことのみ児童合唱団, Kotonomi Jidō Gasshōdan)
