= List of Kikai Sentai Zenkaiger episodes =

Kikai Sentai Zenkaiger is a Japanese tokusatsu drama celebrating the 45th anniversary of Toei's long-running Super Sentai series produced by TV Asahi and the second series in the franchise filmed in the Reiwa period. The series follows the titular Zenkaigers, a team composed of one human and four Kikainoids, mechanical life forms from the parallel world of Kikaitopia who fight the evil dynasty of Tozitend by harnessing the powers of their Super Sentai predecessors.

== Episodes ==
No.	English title Original Japanese title	Directed by	Written by	Original release date
1	"The Machine World Is Mysterious!"; Transliteration: "Kikai Sekai wa Kikikaikai!" (Japanese: キカイ世界はキキカイカイ！)	Shojiro Nakazawa	Junko Kōmura	March 7, 2021
Various parallel worlds, including those of past Super Sentai, were sealed into Toziru Gears by the Tozitend Dynasty of the parallel world of Kikaitopia. The final world in their sights was the one where Kaito Goshikida resides, but it was fused with a portion of Kikaitopia. A month later, the Kikainoids manage to integrate with human society, but the Tozitend launch an invasion, creating a massive rift in the unified society. While taking cover, Kaito accidentally activates his robotic bird-like companion, Secchan, who drags him and Kaito's grandmother, Yatsude, to a secret lab created by Kaito's missing scientist parents, Isao and Mitsuko, and unveils the Geartlinger and Sentai Gears based on the past Super Sentai's worlds. Using the devices, Kaito enlists a heroic Kikainoid named Juran as they transform into the Zenkaigers and destroy the invading forces of Tozitend's field commander, Barashitara. After the battle, Kaito, Juran, and Yatsude discover the entire city and its population are sprouting mushrooms.
2	"The Roaring Beast Is Troublesome!"; Transliteration: "Gao na Yajū ga Goyakkai!" (Japanese: ガオな野獣がごやっかい！)	Shojiro Nakazawa	Junko Kōmura	March 14, 2021
Realizing how the Zenkaigers could threaten the Tozitend's conquest, the latter's technical officer Izirude transforms a Kudak foot soldier into the monster Kinoko World using the Kinokotopia Toziru Gear. Kinoko World sprouts mushrooms across the city before Kaito and Juran confront him, though he manages to escape. At Secchan's suggestion, the Zenkaigers decide to recruit others to their cause. They find little success until they cross paths with the animal-loving Kikainoid Gaon. After Kinoko World starts using poisonous mushrooms, Gaon joins Kaito and Juran to stop the monster. They succeed, but Tozitend deploys a giant Kudaitest foot soldier and empower it with Kinoko World's Toziru Gear. Juran and Gaon enlarge to fight the giant, with Kaito fusing them into the mecha Zenkaioh so they can destroy it and free Kinokotopia. After introducing Gaon to Yatsude, Secchan demands the Zenkaigers find more recruits.
3	"The Seriously Nununu Witch!"; Transliteration: "Maji de Nu'nu'nu na Mahōtsukai!" (Japanese: マジでぬぬぬな魔法使い！)	Ryuta Tasaki	Junko Kōmura	March 21, 2021
Barashitara employs the help of Koori World to freeze the entire town and to stop the Zenkaigers from meddling with their invasion plans. As a result of the ice, the Zenkaigers accidentally meet Magine, Juran's neighbor from Kikaitopia. Although Magine refuses to join the Zenkaigers due to her poor self-esteem, she uses her fortune telling skills to divine Koori World's location, but they end up going on several wild goose chases. Koori World is later discovered freezing the entire ocean, and Magine decides to join the team as Zenkai Magine, using her magical spells as an advantage against the monster. When the mecha ZenkaiOh JuraGaon is formed to fight Dai Koori World, Magine transforms into Magine Dragon to assist them again and put an end to the Dai World while liberating Kooritopia. After being introduced to Yatsude, Magine uses her fortune telling to get a clue for the last Zenkaiger member.
4	"The Trembling Big Meddler!"; Transliteration: "Buruburu Dekkai Osekkai!" (Japanese: ブルブルでっかいおせっかい！)	Ryuta Tasaki	Junko Kōmura	March 28, 2021
After creating Boxing World, Izirude orders Tozitend janitor Vroon to be executed to cover up his mistakes. While on the run, Vroon ends up crossing paths with the Zenkaigers while they are busy fighting Boxing World, wherein the team helps him escape. In return, he tells them of Tozitend's plot to capture parallel universes and how the destruction of a World/Dai World frees them. Deciding to stand up to Izirude for constantly mistreating him, Vroon voluntarily joins the Zenkaigers as their fifth member and manages to defeat Boxing World. While ZenkaiOh JuraGaon is formed against Dai Boxing World, Zenkaizer fuses Magine and Vroon into ZenkaiOh VrooMagine to destroy the Dai World and liberate Boxingtopia. At the Colorful cafe, Vroon lets slip information that he had heard of Kaito's parents within Tozitend's base.
5	"Make Sushi or Be Made into Sushi, a Sushi Tournament!"; Transliteration: "Nigiri Nigirare Sushi Taikai!" (Japanese: 握り握られスシ大会！)	Satoshi Morota	Junko Kōmura	April 4, 2021
After Vroon makes an off-hand remark about Kaito's missing parents, the latter theorizes they might be prisoners of Tozitend. However, he also starts to feel guilty over not being able to help the people he had the chance to, but did not. Kaito's desperation to save his parents causes him to jeopardize the Zenkaigers' fight with Sushi World, causing him and Juran to get trapped in a giant sushi roll and realize too late that his selfishness also endangered nearby civilians. The next day, Gaon, Magine, and Vroon fight Sushi World and Barashitara to free the victims. Despite being stuck, Kaito utilizes Shishi Red's amazing luck to catch up with his comrades and finish the monster together. After ZenkaiOh JuraGaon and VrooMagine kill Dai Sushi World, Zenkaizer tries to latch on to Barashitara and get to the Tozitend Palace, but to no avail. Over dinner, Juran swears to help Kaito find his parents and liberate all of the parallel worlds in Tozitend's captivity. Meanwhile, Izirude seeks a test subject for his newest creation.
6	"The Unpleasant and Incomprehensible Garbage Treatment!"; Transliteration: "Fukai Fukakai Gomi Atsukai!" (Japanese: 不快不可解ゴミあつかい！)	Satoshi Morota	Junko Kōmura	April 11, 2021
Barashitara once again employs the help of Gomi World to bury the Earth with garbage despite Boccowaus' protest. After retreating into a landfill, the Zenkaigers clean up the area to find him, but Vroon has Magine dismissed due to her clumsiness and laziness. Vroon manages to resist Gomi World's laziness-inducing wave while digging into the landfill until he finds the World. Magine rejoins her teammates to fight Gomi World and Dai Gomi World. Having witnessed Kaito and the Zenkaigers, a mysterious young man returns to meet his father, Barashitara.
7	"The Prince of the Demon World Is Short-Tempered!"; Transliteration: "Makai no Ōji wa Ki ga Mijikai!" (Japanese: 魔界の王子は気がみじかい！)	Kyohei Yamaguchi	Junko Kōmura	April 18, 2021
The mysterious individual reveals himself as Stacy, who uses Izirude's Geartozinger and Dark Sentai Gears to unleash fake versions of the Gorengers, Magirangers, and Boukengers against the Zenkaigers. As the Zenkaigers are overwhelmed and Gaon is unable to hurt his supposed predecessors in combat, the team is forced to retreat. Kaito decides to console Gaon over his affection for humans before Stacy ambushes then with the Gorengers and Gaorangers. Confronting Kaito alone, Stacy reveals himself as a Human/Kikainoid hybrid who agreed to become Izirude's test subject and Tozitend's enforcer, Stacaesar. After the Zenkaigers destroy his Sentai copies, including his fake mecha Daizyuzin, GaoKing, MagiKing and DaiBouken, Stacaesar overwhelms them with an army of fake Sentai mechas at his disposal.
8	"Going Door to Door to Another World?!"; Transliteration: "Doa Tu Doa de Bessekai?!" (Japanese: ドアtoドアで別世界?!)	Kyohei Yamaguchi	Junko Kōmura	April 25, 2021
Stacaesar's summoned Sentai mecha suddenly disappear as quickly as they were summoned due to the Geartozinger's energy being depleted. In response, Barashitara sends Door World banish the Zenkaigers to different parts of the world through several misplaced doors. While Kaito manages to get to Stacy's location to continue their fight, the Kikainoid Zenkaigers become giant to return to Japan just in time to save Zenkaizer from Stacaesar's Maskmen and Fivemen. After destroying Door World, Stacaesar has Dai Door World handle ZenkaiOh while his fake Flashmen fight Zenkaizer, only for both of his forces defeated. He summons the Gekirangers and Goseigers' respective mecha, GekiTohja and Gosei Great, but a mysterious ship destroys them before the occupant, Zocks Goldtsuiker, introduces himself and transforms into Twokaiser to fight Stacaesar, destroying some of his Dark Sentai Gears in the process.
9	"World Pirates, Delightful and Thrilling!"; Transliteration: "Sekai Kaizoku, Yukai Tsūkai!" (Japanese: 世界海賊、愉快ツーカイ！)	Shojiro Nakazawa	Junko Kōmura	May 2, 2021
Zocks brings his siblings, sister Flint and brothers Cuttaner and Ricky, to Colorful to introduce themselves after the fight with Stacaesar. However, they plunder all the items inside, leading to Kaito challenging him to a duel with the promise of repaying the stolen items. The next day, in the middle of their fight, Barashitara employs Kashiwamochi World to turn most of the townspeople, including Gaon, Magine, and Flint, into Kashiwa mochi addicts. Zocks decides to make the World the object of their duel and successfully destroys it, while ZenkaiOh JuraGaon destroys the following Dai World. While Zocks won the duel by default, he exploits a loophole to declare Kaito the winner. However, he repays the stolen items in his native Kaizokutopia's currency, which is invalid in the human world.
10	"Blue Skies Day and Night!"; Transliteration: "Ohiru mo Yoru demo Burū Sukai!" (Japanese: お昼も夜でもブルースカイ！)	Shojiro Nakazawa	Junko Kōmura	May 9, 2021
The Zenkaigers manage to reach a truce with the World Pirates and convince them not to commit any acts of piracy. However, a strangely cheerful Zocks continues to endanger civilians while fighting Tozitend's Mahiru World. Wanting to find out more about them, Kaito boards the pirates' headquarters, the Battleship CrocoDaiOh, and learns the World Pirates seek the Toziru Gear containing the parallel world of SDtopia, which placed a curse on Cuttaner and Ricky that trapped them in their current robotic forms, so they can revert the twins to their human forms. Mahiru World unleashes three artificial suns across the globe to render the planet in eternal noon, causing trouble for both humans and Kikainoids. However, the Goldtsuiker siblings are unaffected due to living in CrocoDaiOh. Zocks fights Mahiru World, putting the civilians in harm's way again, but the Zenkaigers manage to save them despite their exhaustion and ZenkaiOh VrooMagine defeats the Dai World to restore night to Japan. Meanwhile, Barashitara tells Bokkowaus of his intentions to exploit the Zenkaigers and Goldtsuikers' infighting.
11	"Everyone's Playing Tag?!"; Transliteration: "Wataru Seken wa Onigokko kai?!" (Japanese: 渡る世間は鬼ゴッコかい?!)	Ryuta Tasaki	Junko Kōmura	May 16, 2021
During a shopping spree, Onigokko World starts to turn everyone into oni and force them to play the game of Japanese tag. Cuttaner and Ricky become the first victims due to an argument, followed by several townspeople and eventually Vroon and Magine. Flint feels guilty due to her ignorance, which led to Cuttaner and Ricky being trapped in their SD forms, and works on duplicating the Zenkaigers' Sentai Gears so Zocks can save their brothers. During Onigokko World's second attack, Kaito uses the Goseigers' powers to expel the infected townspeople as Zocks uses Flint's Sentai Gears to free the victims, allowing the Zenkaigers to finish him. The Dai Onigokko World forces ZenkaiOh to play a game of hot potato with an exploding mask. After ZenkaiOh kills an extra Kudaitest, Cuttaner and Ricky pilot CrocoDaiOh and pretend to quarrel over a chase that leads to Dai Onigokko World being killed by his own bomb. Flint thanks Kaito for his encouragement and inspiring her to create their own Sentai Gears. Meanwhile, Izirude and his team construct a giant mecha.
12	"Slow Snail, Hard Shell!"; Transliteration: "Noronoro Maimai, Katai Kai!" (Japanese: ノロノロマイマイ、カタい貝！)	Ryuta Tasaki	Junko Kōmura	May 23, 2021
Barashitara sends Katatsumuri World to trap his victims in a slowdown barrier, with Juran, Magine and Zocks among his victims. In response, the remaining Zenkaigers cooperate with the Goldtsuiker siblings to use their Turboranger Gears to nullify Katatsumuri World's powers and finish him off. While fighting Dai Katatsumuri World, Stacaesar deploys in his new Battle Caesar Robo to eliminate the Zenkaigers personally, but Flint has the CrocoDaiOh modified to fuse with the twins, allowing Twokaiser to form TwoKaiOh Cuttaner and defeat the Dai World, forcing the outnumbered Stacaesar to retreat.
13	"Recycling Once Again!"; Transliteration: "Risaikuru Surya Mō Ikkai!" (Japanese: リサイクルすりゃもう一回！)	Hiroyuki Katō	Junko Kōmura	May 30, 2021
The Zenkaigers begin to gain popularity with their fellow citizens, with Gaon in particular getting to enjoy playing with human children. However, Barashitara employs Recycle World to turn humans into Recycle Kudaks and give them fake Toziru Gears to instil commotion between the Zenkaigers and Twokaiser. After forcibly dragging Zocks away from the battle, the Zenkaigers formulate a plan by distracting the Recycle Kudaks while Gaon and Twokaiser kill Recycle World to purify his victims. Upon its arrival, Dai Recycle World resurrects four previously defeated Dai Worlds to his aid and manages to defeat both ZenkaiOhs through their combined forces. Despite this, TwokaiOh Ricky manages to defeat them one by one. Just as Dai Recycle World is left alone, Stacaesar personally kills him with Battle Caesar Robo.
14	"Duel! Zenkai vs. Twokai!"; Transliteration: "Kettō! Zenkai Tai Tsūkai!" (Japanese: 決闘！ゼンカイVSツーカイ！)	Hiroyuki Katō	Junko Kōmura	June 6, 2021
After defeating Dai Recycle World and receiving an offer from Stacy, Zocks challenges Kaito to a duel under the promise of having him assist in accessing Tozitend's base to obtain the SD Toziru Gear. After seemingly killing Zenkaizer, Stacy prepares to attack the Goldtsuiker siblings, but Kaito emerges unharmed due to the Maskmen's Aura Power, having foreseen Stacy's deception from the start and convincing everyone to stage the fight. Zenkaizer and Twokaiser fight the Tozitend forces, with the latter using Big One's authority to turn Stacaesar's fake J.A.K.Q. Dengekitai against him. Twokaiser pilots his mecha TwokaiOh to destroy Battle Caesar Robo, forcing Stacy to retreat. As gratitude for saving Kaito, Yatsude invites the Goldtsuiker siblings to dinner at Colorful.
15	"Gachon! A Sharp Turn into Retro!"; Transliteration: "Gachōn! Retoro ni Kyū Senkai!" (Japanese: ガチョーン！レトロに急旋回！)	Shojiro Nakazawa	Junko Kōmura	June 13, 2021
At Colorful, the Zenkaigers meet an introverted boy named Ryo, who had just moved out and is having trouble adjusting to his new neighborhood. Gege, aide to Tozitend emperor Bokkowaus, enlists Retro World to turn the entire city into a mixture of Japan's past era. As the townspeople start to get used to the changes, Retro World unleashes a wave that trap victims' minds inside their happiest memories. Being unaffected since they only have terrible memories of suffering under Tozitend's regime, the Kikainoid Zenkaigers fight and destroy Retro World. The World's brief restoration allows Zenkaizer and the Goldtsuiker siblings to join in the fight against Dai Retro World despite a slight hindrance in the latter's part. With the city once again saved, Ryo starts to get along with his new friends thanks to Yatsude's help.
16	"It's a Magnet at Its Limit!"; Transliteration: "Jishaku Shaku da ze Mō Genkai!" (Japanese: 磁石シャクだぜ もう限界！)	Shojiro Nakazawa	Junko Kōmura	June 20, 2021
Because of Bokkowaus' favoritism, Gege gets another chance by deploying Jishaku World to magnetize the townspeople, including the Zenkaigers. Kaito discovers Stacy dining at Colorful due to Yatsude's kindness reminding him of his late mother, which Zocks uses to blackmail Stacy into luring the World into a trap. With the Fivemen's super-intelligence, Kaito deduces Jishaku World's weakness to fire, allowing his teammates and Zocks to finish him. Dai Jishaku World arrives, using its magnetism to break apart ZenkaiOh and TwokaiOh, but the Kikainoid Zenkaigers use his powers against him and destroy him. In gratitude for Stacy's help, Kaito and Yatsude decide to treat him the next time he visits Colorful. Meanwhile, Gege's intervention spares Barashitara and Izirude from Bokkowaus' wrath and decides to keep Stacy's involvement a secret.
17	"Nunu, Occult Club!"; Transliteration: "Nunutto Okaruto Dōkōkai!" (Japanese: ぬぬっとオカルト同好会！)	Kyohei Yamaguchi	Junko Kōmura	June 27, 2021
A trio of children forms an occult club with Magine after reports of paranormal activities in their school. When Tomei World transforms his targets invisible, including Juran, Magine becomes agitated after assuming that he was behind the paranormal activities and vents her anger against her opponent. While the Zenkaigers are fighting against Dai Tomei World, Juran took advantage of his situation by faking the paranormal activities in the school to satisfy the occult club members. However at the end, the real ghost appears and confronts Juran.
18	"Life Is Short, Fall in Love at Full Throttle!"; Transliteration: "Inochi Mijikashi, Koi Seyo Zenkai!" (Japanese: いのち短し、恋せよゼンカイ！)	Kyohei Yamaguchi	Junko Kōmura	July 4, 2021
Barashitara deploys Renai World to put the city under his love spell, with Vroon in particular falling for Kaito's former middle school classmate. Due to the World's effects, both the Zenkaigers and Zocks are left unable to fight him until he uses a heartbreak spell to provoke them into attacking him. With Secchan's advice, Kaito uses the Jetman Gear to reenact Gai Yūki's death to distract Renai World before he is destroyed, freeing his victims. The Dai Renai World attempts to put ZenkaiOh and TwokaiOh into another love spell, but their jealousy is used against him and leads to his destruction. Meanwhile, Stacy visits Colorful while the Zenkaigers are busy with Renai World and stumbles onto a photo of Kaito's parents.
19	"Zenkai Change, Super Zenkai!"; Transliteration: "Zenkai Aratame, Chō Zenkai!" (Japanese: ゼンカイ改め、超ゼンカイ！)	Hiroyuki Katō	Junko Kōmura	July 11, 2021
Barashitara employs the help of Kabutomushi World to send the Zenkaigers and World Pirates into a rhinoceros beetle hunting illusion, doing so under the premise of providing Tozitend with a supply of free labor. Meanwhile, Stacy sneaks into Izirude's lab and discovers Kaito's parents in digitized captivity. He inadvertently activates them, alerting Secchan of a new blueprint. With all the Zenkaigers under Kabutomushi World's trance, Secchan gets Flint to help construct the Zenkaiju Gear, allowing the recently-freed Kaito to transform into Super Zenkaizer to counter Kabutomushi World's brute strength while the freed Kikainoid Zenkaigers participate in the fight against Dai Kabutomushi World. During a feast at Colorful, Flint reveals she duplicated the Zenkaiju Gear for Zock's usage as her payment, much to Secchan's dismay.
20	"Swordsman and World Pirate, a Brother's Promise."; Transliteration: "Kenshi to Kaizoku, Ani no Chikai." (Japanese: 剣士と界賊、兄の誓い。)	Satoshi Morota	Nobuhiro Mouri	July 18, 2021
After Magine is kidnapped, the other Zenkaigers look for a way to rescue her. Meanwhile, Zocks returns from the World of Saber, but is followed by Reika and Ryoga Shindai, who seek to reclaim the Ocean History Wonder Ride Book. During the subsequent argument, Hikoboshi World kidnaps Reika, forcing Ryoga to align himself with the Zenkaigers to lure out Hikoboshi World. As Reika and Magine free other captured victims, Zocks finds himself impressed by Ryoga's attachment to his sister and decides to return the stolen Wonder Ride Book to him. When Tozitend forces attack, Zocks gives the Zenkaigers three Rider Gears that Flint created based on Kamen Rider-related universes the Goldtsuikers traveled to, to help them before he and Ryoga transform into Super Twokaiser and Kamen Rider Durendal respectively to destroy Hikoboshi World. After the Zenkaigers and World Pirates fight Dai Hikoboshi World and turn his tanzaku paper against him, the Goldtsuikers bring the Shindais back to the latter's world. Unbeknownst to them, a mysterious being hatches from his petrified form in the Sword of Logos' Agastya Base space station. Note : This episode concludes a crossover event that begins on Kamen Rider Saber's special episode. Additionally, as part of the Movie Release Commemorative Combo Special (映画公開記念合体スペシャル, Eiga Kōkai Kinen Gattai Supesharu), the crossover also serves as a tie-in to the crossover film Saber + Zenkaiger: Super Hero Senki.
21	"Giant Monster of Great Destruction!"; Transliteration: "Dai Kaijū no Dai Hakai!" (Japanese: 大カイジュウの大破壊！)	Hiroyuki Katō	Junko Kōmura	August 1, 2021
The Tozitend deploys Copy World, who is capable of making evil copies, to attack the city. The Zenkaigers and World Pirates attempt to fight back, only to learn evil versions of Kaito and Zocks were produced. With their impostors running rampant, Zocks frees Kaito from the authorities and gets him to cooperate in the hunt for Copy World. The Kikainoid Zenkaigers succeed in disabling the World's powers and finish it while Zenkaizer and Twokaiser finish off their duplicates. The Dai Copy World defeats both ZenkaiOhs with his supply of evil copies, forcing Zenkaizer and Twokaiser to enlarge and fuse their Super forms into ZenkaijuOh and lay waste to the evil copies before destroying the Dai World for good.
22	"Let's Have a Bullfighting Party!"; Transliteration: "Ushishi na Mōretsu Tōgyūkai!" (Japanese: ウシシなモ～れつ闘牛会！)	Katsuya Watanabe	Junko Kōmura	August 8, 2021
The Zenkaigers head out to engage Tōgyū World, who was sent to make people behave like bulls, but are overpowered by the rampaging victims. The matter worsens when the Zenkaiju Gear goes missing. Gaon reveals he drove it off when it seemingly gained sentience, which Juran calls him out for. While the Zenkaigers search for the Zenkaiju Gear, Gaon realizes his bonds with his team and goes out of his way to help a fellow Kikainoid. When Tōgyū World strikes again, the Zenkaigers are overpowered, with some of them falling under his control. Suddenly, Zocks enters the fray and Kaito's Zenkaiju Gear returns to him, allowing them to finish off the World and free its victims from its control. When Dai Tōgyū World attacks, Zenkaizer and Twokaizer form ZenkaijuOh to destroy it, accessing another form to do so. However, Stacy enters the battle in his new robot, Battle Caesar Robo II, and engages ZenkaijuOh in a duel.
23	"Three Great Combinations, the Biggest Battle on Earth!"; Transliteration: "San Dai Gattai Chikyū Saidai no Tatakai!" (Japanese: 三大合体 地球最大の戦い！)	Katsuya Watanabe	Junko Kōmura	August 15, 2021
ZenkaijuOh and Stacy's Battle Caesar Robo II fight each other into the night when Kaito stops the brawl to challenge Stacy to a duel the next day as Gaon is treated for his injuries. Later that night, the team discuss Stacy while Stacy himself reaffirms his vow to defeat Zenkaizer. The next day, Stacy and Kaito engage each other one on one, but when Stacaesar uses his Dark Sentai Gears to gain an advantage, Kaito's teammates enter the fray. In response, Stacaesar summons his robot, with Kaito and Juran enlarging themselves and forming Super ZenkaiOh Juran to engage the enemy. After a Kudaitest impedes them, Zocks also brings in a new robot combination, Super TwokaiOh, to destroy it before combining with Kaito into ZenkaijuOh to defeat Stacy. Afterwards, the Zenkaigers celebrate their victory while Gege rescues Stacy under Bokkowaus' orders and Izirude brings out Mitsuko's stasis pod.
24	"Invasion Complete! Can We Take It Back?!"; Transliteration: "Shinryaku Kanryō! Dekiru ka Dakkai?!" (Japanese: 侵略完了！できるか奪回？！)	Kyohei Yamaguchi	Junko Kōmura	August 22, 2021
Tozitend deploys Vacances World to attack the city, and the latter quickly succeeds in making everyone lazy and carefree. Seeing no harm in the World's actions nor in taking a vacation, the Zenkaigers and World Pirates join in on the fun with their opponent. However, Barashitara is forced to kill Vacances World after his attack affects the entire Tozitend army and transfer the latter's Toziru Gear to a Kudaitest. After destroying Dai Vacances World, the Zenkaigers are reprimanded by Yatsude for making a mess of Colorful during their time under Tozitend's influence.
25	"Do It Over! Zenkaiger Revised!"; Transliteration: "Yarinaose! Zenkaijā Kai!" (Japanese: やり直せ！ゼンカイジャー・改！)	Kyohei Yamaguchi	Saburo Yatsude	August 29, 2021
While the Zenkaigers fight Hidokei World, the monster kidnaps Secchan and brings him back in time to the day the Zenkaigers were formed to manipulate the past in the Tozitend's favor, but his attempts to warn the Tozitend officers of their future falls on deaf ears. Meanwhile, Kaito pursues Hidokei World and Secchan through time, but loses his memory and is forced to relive the experience on his own. As Hidokei World and Secchan return to the present, the former decides to murder Kaito's parents, but Secchan secretly warns the present day Zenkaigers, who confront Hidokei World before he can enact his plan. With no Kudaitest deployed to use his Toziru Gear due to Bokkowaus berating the failures of time travel, Hidokeitopia is liberated instantly after Hidokei World's destruction. Later that night, the Zenkaigers and World Pirates celebrate Secchan for the success of their operation.
26	"The Remodeled Prince and the Dark Surgeon!"; Transliteration: "Kaizō Ōji to Yami no Gekai!" (Japanese: 改造王子と闇の外科医！)	Shojiro Nakazawa	Junko Kōmura	September 5, 2021
Izirude finishes treating Stacy and applies some upgrades into his body before sending him to fight the Zenkaigers again. As Stacy confronts Kaito once more, the latter is briefly relieved to see him and hesitates to fight him. Joining the fray, Zocks and Juran attempt to convince Kaito that he has no option but to fight back. When Stacy attacks again, he summons copies of Super Gosei Red and Abare Max as well as a dark version of ZenkaiOh JuraGaon called Black JuraGaon to assist him. Kaito decides to fight Stacy until they can come to a compromise, but their fight is interrupted when Stacy is called back to help look for Mitsuko, who escaped Izirude's lab. Upon learning about Mitsuko, Kaito and Yatsude are shocked.
27	"A Great Voyage Through Seven Worlds!"; Transliteration: "Nana-tsu no Sekai o Dai Kōkai!" (Japanese: 7つのセカイを大航海！)	Shojiro Nakazawa	Junko Kōmura	September 12, 2021
Certain that Mitsuko escaped to another world, Kaito begins searching for her across the worlds he and the Zenkaigers previously liberated along with Juran, Magine, and the World Pirates while Izirude orders Stacy to look for her as well. During their travels, the Zenkaigers discover that Tozitend's forces are attacking the worlds in search for Mitsuko and confront them directly by claiming that they already rescued her. Stacy attempts to stop them from escaping with Black JuraGaon, but the mecha is destroyed by ZenkaijuOh. Returning to their world, Kaito reveals that the "Mitsuko" they rescued was a disguised Magine as part of a plan to dissuade Tozitend from attacking the multiverse by making them believe she is on Kaito's world.
28	"Weekly Shonen Manga World of Great Illustrations!"; Transliteration: "Shūkan Shōnen Manga Warudo Dai Zukai!" (Japanese: 週刊少年マンガワルド大図解！)	Hiroyuki Katō	Junko Kōmura	September 19, 2021
While Kaito, Gaon and Flint are off-world to find Mitsuko, Tozitend sends Manga World to turn people into manga characters. The Zenkaigers fight back, but Juran, Magine and the Goldtsuiker twins get trapped in a manga and learn they have to survive or else they cannot return. When Kaito, Gaon, and Flint return, the team set up a trap to lure in Manga World as Zocks destroys the monster to return his victims to normal, followed by ZenkaijuOh defeating the corresponding Dai World. Izirude later gets another idea to extract new intel from Isao through mental simulations.
29	"Do You Know the Prince's Aim?"; Transliteration: "Ōji no Nerai, Shitteiru kai?" (Japanese: 王子のねらい、知っているかい？)	Hiroyuki Katō	Junko Kōmura	September 26, 2021
The Zenkaigers find themselves overwhelmed by Tennis World, who transforms many citizens and Yatsude into tennis balls. Additionally, as the only way to defeat Tennis World is to play tennis with him, Zocks and the Zenkaigers challenge the World to a match. Despite being defeated and all hope seeming lost, Kaito and the others receive help from Stacy before ZenkaiOh VrooMagine destroy the corresponding Dai World. While returning to Izirude's lab, Stacy encounters a mysterious figure.
30	"Is the Machine Next Door Persimmon-Eating Destruction?!"; Transliteration: "Tonari no Kikai wa Kaki Kū Hakai?!" (Japanese: 隣のキカイはカキ食うハカイ？！)	Katsuya Watanabe	Junko Kōmura	October 3, 2021
The Zenkaigers find themselves facing off against Hoshigaki World and the Tozitend's new enforcer Hakaizer, who wields the Zenryoku Zenkai Cannon, which is capable of summoning multiple past Sentai members at once. Secchan recognizes both Hakaizer and his cannon as Zenkaizer's prototypes, leading to the hypothetical conclusion that Tozitend has been abusing the Goshikida scientists' intellect for their nefarious purposes. As Hoshigaki World severely dehydrates people, the Zenkaigers and Twokaizer strategize an attack plan to separate their opponents, allowing Kaito to reclaim the Zenryoku Zenkai Cannon and destroy the World while Hakaizer is forced to retreat. After Dai Kaki World's destruction, Izirude uses more intel from the comatose Isao.
31	"Full Combination! New Release!"; Transliteration: "Gyūtto Gattai! Nyūtto Kōkai!" (Japanese: ギュウっと合体！NEWっと公開！)	Katsuya Watanabe	Junko Kōmura	October 10, 2021
Tozitend sends Gyunyu World, who uses his powers to turn all things white. The Zenkaigers fight him, but are stopped by Hakaizer. After the battle, Kaito and the others discover that Gyunyu World's powers also cause computer data to turn blank, including Secchan's memories. To save their friend, Kaito and the others fight Gyunyu World again and easily destroy him while Twokaizer distracts Hakaizer. When Dai Gyunyu World appears, the restored Secchan shares his findings on the Zenryoku Zenkai Cannon and Kaito enlarges it into the Zenryoku Eagle to destroy the enemy. Izirude sends a platoon of Kudaitests, including the upgraded New Kudaitests, and the Zenkaigers combine JuraGaon, VrooMagine and the Zenryoku Eagle into Zenryoku ZenkaiOh for the first time to destroy them.
32	"Sakasama Gets Angry! Is That a Monkey?"; Transliteration: "Ikaru Sakasama! Masaka Saru kai?" (Japanese: 怒るサカサマ！まさかサルかい？)	Kyohei Yamaguchi	Junko Kōmura	October 17, 2021
In response to Hakaizer's creation, Stacy attempts to prove his worth by challenging Kaito once more. However, during the duel, Sakasama World arrives and causes Kaito and Stacy to switch bodies. As the Zenkaigers bring Stacy in Kaito's body back to Colorful to treat him for his injuries, Kaito in Stacy's body infiltrates the Tozitend Palace in the hopes of finding his still missing father, freeing some of Tozitend's prisoners along the way. However, Gege exposes Kaito, forcing him to escape while Sakasama World swaps the World Pirates' bodies. The remaining Zenkaigers assemble to fight the enemy until Kaito returns to assist them in destroying the World and reverse its effects. When Dai Sakasama World attacks, the team forms Zenryoku ZenkaiOh to destroy it. Afterwards, Kaito and Stacy reflect on their experiences in each others' bodies.
33	"Great Teacher Demon Master!"; Transliteration: "Gurēto Tīchā Onizukai!" (Japanese: グレートティーチャー鬼使い！)	Kyohei Yamaguchi	Junko Kōmura	October 24, 2021
The Tozitend deploys Gakuen World, accompanied by Hakaizer, to change reality into the Tozitend Academy despite the Zenkaigers' intervention. Faced with the threat of permanently remaining in school, the Zenkaigers try to find Gakuen World to stop him, but are hindered by the Kudaiters serving as teachers and the school's curriculum favouring the Tozitend's forces. As the team and the World Pirates despair about school, Kaito resolves to stop the World and boosts their morale. After failing a quiz given by Stacy, Kaito and his friends become delinquents, luring out and destroying Gakuen World despite interference from Stacy, Hakaizer and the Tozitend's forces and freeing reality from their grip. When Dai Gakuen World attacks and gives more tests, ZenkaiOh VrooMagine alters them, allowing everyone to pass and destroy the enemy. Afterwards, Kaito shows his friends what a real school is like, to everyone's delight.
34	"The Pumpkin Capturing Contest!"; Transliteration: "Kabocha wo Tori Tori Kyōgikai!" (Japanese: カボチャをトリトリ競技会！)	Shojiro Nakazawa	Junko Kōmura	October 31, 2021
The Zenkaigers make preparations to celebrate Halloween when Halloween World appears, causing turmoil in the city. During their fight, Halloween World loses the Jack-o'-lantern on his head, which weakens him and leads to Hakaizer and Stacy searching for it to reinvigorate the World while the Zenkaigers and World Pirates do the same so they can destroy Halloween World. The Tozitend enforcers succeed, but the monster is destroyed by the Zenkaigers. While ZenkaijuOh fights and destroys Dai Halloween World, the other Zenkaigers face Hakaizer, only to discover to their shock that he is actually Kaito's father Isao. After the battle, the Kikainoids worry about how Kaito will react upon learning the truth about his father.
35	"Diamond ♦ Delight?!"; Transliteration: "Daiyamondo Yukai?!" (Japanese: ダイヤモンド♦ユカイ？！)	Shojiro Nakazawa	Junko Kōmura	November 14, 2021
The Kikainoids struggle with how to tell Kaito that Isao and Hakaizer are the one and same, but this causes Kaito to become worried about how differently they are acting around him. Just as the Kikainoids decide to tell Kaito the truth, Diamond World appears and uses his powers on them. Despite being unable to talk, the Kikainoids protect Hakaizer from Kaito, who starts believing that they are doing so because they are under the world's effect, which angers him. Meanwhile, Stacy swallows his pride and asks for Hakaizer's help to defeat Zenkaizer, forcing Kaito to fight them alone with all of his might. As Zocks destroys Diamond World, Kaito defeats Hakaizer, who recovers his original memories before Stacy takes him away. After the Zenkaigers destroy Dai Diamond World, the Kikainoids apologize to Kaito for not telling him the truth earlier, but Kaito rejoices over the fact that his father is alive and vows to rescue him.
36	"The Surprisingly Shocking Great Kidnapping!"; Transliteration: "Bikkuri Dokkiri Dai Yūkai!" (Japanese: ビックリどっきり大ユーカイ！)	Hiroyuki Katō	Junko Kōmura	November 21, 2021
Accepting the revelation that Hakaizer is Isao, Kaito tells Zocks, who agrees to help him save Isao. While working on a plan to lure out Hakaizer, the Zenkaigers and World Pirates have to face Bikkuribako World, who keeps making things appear out of random places like their equipment, Stacy, Hakaizer, and Barashitara. The World Pirates try to put Bikkuribako World into a hostage situation, but the operation turns disastrous for the Zenkaigers, who interfere by rescuing Flint with the GoGoFive team's powers. At the end of the battle, Kaito acknowledges the World Pirates' good intent, but reaffirms his resolve to rescue Isao on his own terms.
37	"Grudge Radish, Deep Roots!"; Transliteration: "Urami Daikon, Ne ga Fukai!" (Japanese: 恨みダイコン、根が深い！)	Hiroyuki Katō	Junko Kōmura	November 28, 2021
The Tozitend sends Daikon World to use his ability to manipulate discarded items to wreak havoc on society. The Zenkaigers head out to engage the robot, but get buffeted by trash. Meanwhile, Magine and Flint help a little girl named Yuna search for her missing doll. When Yuna reveals she discarded it believing it was not good, Flint reveals she once did likewise to her first music box, though her brother found it later on, and the two ladies encourage the lass to treasure her most important items. When Daikon World strikes again, the Zenkaigers launch an attack on the enemy, destroying it despite interference from Hakaizer and Stacaesar. When Dai Daikon World attacks, the team forms Zenryoku ZenkaiOh to destroy it. Afterwards, Yuna finds her doll among the discarded items that tried to attack her while Boccowaus and Gege hatch a plan involving Hakaizer.
38	"It's the Ancestors! The Great Spirit World"; Transliteration: "Gosenzosama da yo! Dai Reikai" (Japanese: ご先祖様だョ！大霊界)	Katsuya Watanabe	Junko Kōmura	December 5, 2021
As the Zenkaigers and World Pirates prepare to celebrate Kaito's birthday and Christmas, they find themselves under attack by Bon World, Shougatsu World, Stacy, Hakaizer, and all of the combatants' ancestors. However, the Tozitend forces are forced to deploy Bon World alone when both monsters' powers contradict each other, with Bon World's ability to resurrect his targets' deceased ancestors being corrupted into merciless killers by Shougatsu World's powers. During the battle, Kaito defends Stacy from the latter's mother, causing Stacy to realize that he is slowly turning Hakaizer into a copy of Barashitara. After Kaito and Zocks defeat Dai Bon World, Boccowaus lends Izirude pieces of his ancestors' corpse for use on Hakaizer.
39	"Happy Birthday to Infinite New Year's!"; Transliteration: "Mugen Akeome Tanjōkai!" (Japanese: 無限あけおめ誕生会！)	Katsuya Watanabe	Junko Kōmura	December 12, 2021
The Zenkaigers and World Pirates attempt to continue celebrating Kaito's birthday, Christmas, and New Year's, but Shougatsu World attacks and tricks them into not fighting him multiple times. Flint tries to explain that Christmas is not over yet while the Goldtsuiker twins, Yatsude and Secchan discuss the situation and the enemy. Kaito encourages his team to fight and celebrate his birthday later. With that, the team deceives Shougatsu World and destroy him despite Stacy's attempts to defend him. When Dai Shougatsu World attacks, the Zenkaigers engage him in their robots and destroy him despite interference from Stacy and his new robot, Battle Caesar Robo III. However, as soon as the Dai World is defeated, a menacing kaiju-esque robot enters the battlefield.
40	"Dad's Rescue, One Chance!"; Transliteration: "Tōchan Dakkai, Wanchan Ikkai!" (Japanese: とーちゃん奪回、ワンチャン一回！)	Katsuya Watanabe	Junko Kōmura	December 19, 2021
Thanks to Izirude's upgrades, Hakaizer inflicts mass destruction on the city via HakaijuOh and overpowers the Zenkaigers while Boccowaus, Barashitara, and Izirude discuss Hakaizer's upgrades and Stacy stumbles across Hakaizer and HakaijuOh's blueprints. That night, Kaito and his team resolve to save Isao from the Tozitend's clutches, even if they must chase him across the multiverse. The next day, the Zenkaigers head out to engage a rampaging HakaijuOh using Zenryoku ZenkaiOh while Zocks, aided by the blueprints Stacy gave him, frees Hakaizer from the robot. On the ground, Juran, Magine, Vroon, and Gaon help Isao remember his son while Twokaizer and Zenkaizer destroy HakaijuOh with assistance from the Goldtsuiker twins. Kaito blasts Hakaizer until the foe's suit runs out of power, causing him to revert to Isao. Afterwards, the team celebrates Isao's reunion with Yatsude and his son.
41	"The Noodle Rabbit Hole Goes Deep!"; Transliteration: "Oshimen Numa wa Tsurutsuru Fukai!" (Japanese: 推しメン沼はつるつる深い！)	Ryuta Tasaki	Junko Kōmura	December 26, 2021
With Isao free of the Tozitend's brainwashing, he and Kaito are able to reunite after being separated for so long. However, their reunion is short-lived when they, the Kikainoids, and the World Pirates become embroiled in a culinary competition to determine whether soba noodles or udon noodles are better. Kaito determines Oshimen World to be the culprit and manages to band his teammates together through his own tricks. Dai Oshimen World manages to turn its opponents into a state of disorganization, but their obsession with noodles are used against him. With Flint's help, Isao is able to construct a dimension-traveling minivan to search for Mitsuko and gives Kaito an oddly-shaped Sentai Gear as a parting gift.
42	"A New Hero! A Covert Kotatsu Meeting!!"; Transliteration: "Shin Hīrō nya! Okota no Mikkai!!" (Japanese: 新ヒーローにゃ！おコタの密会!!)	Ryuta Tasaki	Junko Kōmura	January 9, 2022
Tozitend sends Kotatsu World to weaken the Zenkaigers and World Pirates' resolve with his namesake, leaving the heat-sensitive Juran to face the new World and Barashitara alone. In order to get the entire team onto the battlefield, Kaito manages to use the Patrangers' powers while Secchan pilots the CrocoDaiOh to the scene, followed by the use of Isao's new Sentai Gear. This results in the appearance of Don Momotaro, who rushes to Juran's aid in executing their opponent and lending Zenkaizer his Enya Rideon to combine with Juran into Don ZenkaiOh to put an end to Dai Kotatsu World. As Don Momotaro leaves for parts unknown, a god-like entity possesses Gege and uses him to free Stacy from his prison in order to use him as a medium and further his plans.
43	"The Weathercock's Head Is Directly Opposite the Wind!"; Transliteration: "Kazamidori no Atama wa Kaze no Mamukai!" (Japanese: 風見鶏の頭は風の真向かい！)	Kyohei Yamaguchi	Junko Kōmura	January 16, 2022
The Tozitend sends a weathercock-themed World to use its wind-based powers to overwhelm the Zenkaigers and World Pirates. Stacy comes to their aid, but the heroes become suspicious over Stacy suddenly switching sides along with his uncharacteristic smiling. Nevertheless, they accept their new ally's help in defeating the World and its corresponding Dai World.
44	"SD = Small + Deformed?!"; Transliteration: "Esu Dī wa Sumōru Tasu Dekkai?!" (Japanese: SD＝スモール+デッカい？！)	Kyohei Yamaguchi	Junko Kōmura	January 23, 2022
The Zenkaigers and the World Pirates encounter SD World, who possesses the Toziru Gear the latter group seeks to cure Cuttaner and Ricky. When SD World sets his sights on the Zenkaigers and Zocks, it shrinks Zocks's gear and Kaito's teammates, leaving Zocks at a disadvantage and forcing Kaito to search the city to reassemble his scattered friends. Undaunted and determined to cure his younger twin brothers, Zocks engages SD World, but it proves to be a formidable enemy and overpowers the pirate until the twins, Kaito, and his friends save him. With that, Zocks leads the charge against SD World, destroying it. When Dai SD World attacks, the team form Zenryoku ZenkaiOh and TwokaiOh to destroy it, finally freeing SDtopia from its Toziru Gear. As the World Pirates bid farewell to the Zenkaigers, Gege-Stacy frees Kaizokutopia from its Toziru Gear.
45	"Super Bad Luck Is the Lowest Fortune?!"; Transliteration: "Chō Daikyōtte Unsei Saikai?!" (Japanese: 超大凶って運勢最下位？！)	Hiroyuki Katō	Junko Kōmura	January 30, 2022
While Barashitara secretly conducts an investigation into Gege, Tozitend sends Omikuji World, whose power to manipulate luck into their favor puts the Zenkaigers and other targets into a series of misfortunes. Despite all means of attack failing, a determined Magine decides to put faith in her own fortune-telling abilities and defeats Omikuji World. As Dai Omikuji World rampages, Gege-Stacy quickly sends nearby Kikainoids into his portals and depowers the Dai World for the Zenkaigers to finish it off. At the end of the battle, Gege-Stacy presents himself as the god of the parallel universes and creator of the worlds to the Zenkaigers.
46	"A Little God Who Jumped Out!"; Transliteration: "Gegetto Tobideta Kami no Chokkai!" (Japanese: ゲゲっと飛び出た神のちょっかい！)	Hiroyuki Katō	Junko Kōmura	February 6, 2022
Using Stacy's body, the god offers the Zenkaigers a way to storm Tozitend's palace and free the remaining captive worlds. To earn their trust, God complies with Kaito's request to stop possessing Stacy and, claiming to have precognition, tells them who will be the next monsters they will face. Following his predictions, the Zenkaigers easily defeat Ninjin, Sapphire and Koumori Worlds, including their Dai versions, unaware that all of them were sent by Bokkowaus at Gege's request all while Gege keeps dragging Kikainoids living on Earth back to Kikaitopia. With Stacy freed from Tozitend's grasp, Kaito invites him to live with Yatsude and the others at Colorful, but he rejects the offer. Meanwhile, the World Pirates are at a loss because they could not find out how to dispel Rikky and Cutanner's curse at SDtopia. When they learn that Kaizokutopia was also liberated, Zocks becomes suspicious about it. Having earned the Zenkaigers' trust, God convinces them to agree with his plan to infiltrate Tozitend's palace, unaware that Bokkowaus is fed up with their meddling and decided to take matters into his own hands.
47	"Enter the Palace! Stand Tall Before the Boss!"; Transliteration: "Paresu Totsu'nyū! Bosu no Mae demo Zu ga Takai!" (Japanese: パレス突入！ボスの前でも頭が高い！)	Shojiro Nakazawa	Junko Kōmura	February 13, 2022
Through God's intervention, the Zenkaigers depart for the Tozitend Palace while he continues bringing Kikainoids back to Kikaitopia and Bokkowaus begins absorbing the remaining Toziru Gears. They reach his chamber, but he sends them back out onto the streets so he can finish his assimilation. Meanwhile, Stacy approaches Yatsude and reveals his true identity, but she forgives him. As the Zenkaigers meet some of the Kikainoids abducted by God, Izirude boards his own giant robot, the Izirudestroyer IV, to kill the Zenkaigers. Juran, Gaon, and Magine confront him, but Kaito and Vroon are attacked by Barashitara, who causes them to lose their Geartilingers. Defenseless, the duo flee until they are rescued by Stacy and Secchan, who traveled to Kikaitopia together to assist them. The World Pirates return to provide further assistance and join forces with Stacy to fight Barashitara while Kaito, Vroon, and Secchan recover their equipment and reunite with their teammates. In retaliation for what he did to Kaito's family, ZenkaiOh JuraGaon and VrooMagine destroy Izirude and his robot before proceeding to fight Bokkowaus. As Stacy and Zocks are overpowered by Barashitara, all three fail to realize that Flint has left to breach the Tozitend Palace's control room.
48	"Heaven's Vengeance Is Slow but Sure, the Fall of the Dynasty!"; Transliteration: "Tenmōkaikai, Ōchō Hōkai!" (Japanese: 天網恢々、王朝崩壊！)	Shojiro Nakazawa	Junko Kōmura	February 20, 2022
Possessed by God, Flint tampers with the gate in Tozitend Palace's control room while the Zenkaigers and Secchan face Bokkowaus and Gege. During their fight, God repossesses Gege and declares that he betrayed Bokkowaus, revealing that his weakpoint is his back. Incensed, Bokkowaus destroys Gege before finishing his absorption process and revealing his true form to fight the Zenkaigers using the powers of the Super Sentai Toziru Gears to destroy their personal Sentai Gears and render them powerless. Despite this, Kaito and the others refuse to give up. In response, the Super Sentai worlds in Bokkowaus's body break free to restore and upgrade their Sentai Gears. Flint returns to her brothers' side in time to help them and Stacy destroy Barashitara as the Zenkaigers destroy Bokkowaus and release the remaining captive worlds. Meanwhile, Isao reuturns home with Mitsuko, whom he found in Sushitopia. As the Zenkaigers celebrate their victory, God possesses Zocks, who takes his family back to Kikaitopia and makes Kaito return with Secchan to Earth, though not before activating the Toziru Gear machine and trapping all worlds inside Toziru Gears again as he possesses Kaito.
49 (Final)	"My World, Everyone's World"; Transliteration: "Ore no Sekai, Min'na no Sekai" (Japanese: 俺の世界、みんなのセカイ)	Shojiro Nakazawa	Junko Kōmura	February 27, 2022
Kaito lives happily with his family, having no memories about other worlds or his fellow Zenkaigers, until he finds a blank Sentai Gear that restores his memories. Kaito confronts God, who reveals that he believes he created too many worlds to take care of. Once he learned of Izirude's research, he helped the Tozitend seal the worlds until Kaito's world and Kikaitopia were merged as a result of the Toziru and Sentai Gear technologies colliding. During the fight between both worlds, God decided to leave only Kaito's world unsealed. Kaito refutes God's plan and fights him, eventually beating him in a game of rock paper scissors. God reveals that the Toziru Gear machine is hidden above the Tokyo Skytree and Kaito destroys it, releasing the captive worlds. Three months later, trade and diplomacy is being established across the multiverse. Stacy remains in Kikaitopia to help improve it despite refusing the locals' offer to become their new ruler. Flint has devised a way to have Ricky and Cutanner freely alternate between their human and SD forms. Encouraged by his parents, Kaito leaves with Secchan and the other Zenkaigers to explore the multiverse.
