= List of Tokusou Sentai Dekaranger characters =

Tokusou Sentai Dekaranger (特捜戦隊デカレンジャー, Tokusō Sentai Dekarenjā) is a Japanese tokusatsu series that serves as the 28th installment in the Super Sentai franchise and the 16th entry in the Heisei era. In an iteration of the planet Earth where extraterrestrial contact is possible, the S.P.D. (Special Police Dekaranger) battles alien criminals collectively called "Alienizers".

== Main characters ==
The main heroes of Tokusou Sentai Dekaranger. From left to right: Tekkan "Tetsu" Aira, Banban "Ban" Akaza, Doggie "Boss" Kruger, Marika "Jasmine" Reimon, Koume "Umeko" Kodou, Senichi "Sen-chan" Enari, and Houji "Hoji" Tomasu.

=== Dekarangers ===
The eponymous Dekarangers are members of the S.P.D.'s Earth unit who protect Earth from intergalactic criminals called Alienizers. (Note: The Dekarangers are named after various types of tea and mystery/crime genre authors.) Each of the primary members possess an SP License (SPライセンス, Esu Pī Raisensu) device, which allows them to transform via Change Mode (チェンジモード, Chenji Mōdo); communicate with each other, analyze items pertaining to a case they are working on, and summon their Deka Machines to battle Kaijuki via Phone Mode (フォンモード, Fon Mōdo), and determine a criminal's innocence in a particular crime and whether or not they can be approved for deletion via Judgement Mode (ジャッジメントモード, Jajjimento Mōdo). While transformed, they each carry a varying pair of D-Arms (ディーアームズ, Dī Āmuzu) sidearms, which can combine to form a firearm-like weapon. They also ride varying Deka Vehicles (デカビークル, Deka Bīkuru) for transportation.

After undergoing further training, the primary Dekarangers gain the ability to assume S.W.A.T. Mode (スワットモード, Suwatto Mōdo), which clads them in armor that grants heat-seeking, X-ray, and night vision capabilities. They also wield high-powered D-Revolver (ディーリボルバー, Dī Riborubā) machine guns.

==== Ban ====
Banban Akaza (赤座 伴番, Akaza Banban), also known as "Ban" (バン), is a hot-headed, chaotic, loudmouthed, bad-tempered, yet fiercely loyal and friendly rookie member of S.P.D., who previously trained in space before being assigned to lead S.P.D.'s Earth unit in the field as Deka Red (デカレッド, Deka Reddo). While he joins the newly created Fire Squad as an elite officer in the series finale, he occasionally returns to help his original team. Initially having an immature personality, he slowly matures throughout the series.

In battle, Ban is a practitioner of the space martial art Juu Kune Do (ジュウクンドー, Jū Kun Dō), (Note: "Juu Kune Do" is a portmanteau of Jeet Kune Do and the Japanese word jū (銃, "gun").) which blends unarmed martial arts skills with gunplay. As Deka Red, he dual wields a pair of D-Magnum (ディーマグナム, Dī Magunamu) rayguns, which can combine to form the Hybrid Magnum (ハイブリッドマグナム, Haiburiddo Magunamu) shotgun and allow him to perform the Magnum Execution (マグナムエクスキュージョン, Magunamu Ekusukyūjon), Moonsault Shot (ムーンサルトショット, Mūnsaruto Shotto), Endless Shot (エンドレスショット, Endoresu Shotto), Hurricane Shot (ハリケーンショット, Harikēn Shotto), and Moonsault Galaxy Shot (ムーンサルトギャラクシーショット, Mūnsaruto Gyarakushī Shotto) attacks. He also shares riding the Machine Doberman (マシンドーベルマン, Mashin Dōberuman) police car with Jasmine. If necessary, he can borrow Doggie Kruger's D-Sword Vega to perform the Akaza Sword Art: Raijin Sword (赤座剣法・雷神剣, Akaza Kenpō Raijin Ken) and Impulse Vega Slash (インパルスベガスラッシュ, Inparusu Bega Surasshu) attacks.

During the events of the crossover film Mahō Sentai Magiranger vs. Dekaranger, Ban acquires a variant of the SP License called the Fire Squad License (ファイヤースクワッドライセンス, Faiyā Sukuwaddo Raisensu), which allows him to transform Murphy K-9 into his armor to assume Battlizer Mode (バトライザーモード, Batoriza Mōdo) where he gains a rocket booster pack and a pair of siren lasers. In this form, he wields a sword/rifle hybrid, which allows him to perform the Battlize Fire Drive (バトライズファイヤードライブ, Batoraizu Faiyā Doraibu) finisher.

As of the direct-to-video anniversary special Tokusou Sentai Dekaranger: 10 Years After, Ban has acquired a red-colored S.W.A.T. Mode vest to signify his membership in the Fire Squad. During the events of the direct-to-video anniversary special Tokusou Sentai Dekaranger 20th: Fireball Booster, he acquires a variant of the SP License called the SP1 License (SP1ライセンス, Esu Pī Wan Raisensu), which allows him to transform into the armored Premiere Deka Red (プレミアデカレッド, Puremia Deka Reddo). (Note: Commonly known as Premiere Deka Red, this form is officially called Deka Red Premiere Mode (デカレッド・プレミアモード, Deka Reddo Puremia Mōdo) and Premiere Red (プレミアレッド, Puremia Reddo).) While transformed, he wields the D-Sword Vega, which allows him to perform the Boost Slash (ブーストスラッシュ, Būsuto Surasshu) finisher.

Ban is portrayed by Ryuji Sainei (載寧 龍二, Sainei Ryūji).

==== Hoji ====
Houji Tomasu (戸増 宝児, Tomasu Hōji), (Note: Also spelt as Houji Tomas and Hoji Tomasu.) also known simply as "Hoji" (ホージー, Hōjī), is the professional, yet arrogant and stubborn, second-in-command and sniper of the team who serves as Deka Blue (デカブルー, Deka Burū). While he is reserved about his personal life and shows little emotion to prevent both from interfering with his work, he has a tendency to blurt out English phrases such as "Perfect!", "Unbelievable!", and "Super cool!". Due to their differing personalities, Hoji clashes with Ban early in the series, though Hoji slowly warms up to, and becomes friends with, Ban. Later in the series, Hoji applies for a gold badge promotion from the Tokkyou division, but ultimately refuses it due to a personal tragedy. In the direct-to-video anniversary special Tokusou Sentai Dekaranger: 10 Years After, Hoji goes undercover as a shut-in after Doggie Kruger's seeming turn to crime to help Ban and Sen-chan restore their leader's reputation.

As Deka Blue, Hoji wields the D-Knuckle (ディーナックル, Dī Nakkuru) and the D-Rod (ディーロッド, Dī Roddo) baton, which can combine to form the D-Sniper (ディースナイパー, Dī Sunaipā) rifle. He also rides the Machine Husky (マシンハスキー, Mashin Hasukī) police motorcycle. Using the D-Rod, Hoji can perform the Blue Finish (ブルーフィニッシュ, Burū Finisshu) attack.

Hoji is portrayed by Tsuyoshi Hayashi (林 剛史, Hayashi Tsuyoshi).

==== Sen-chan ====
Senichi Enari (江成 仙一, Enari Sen'ichi), also known as "Sen-chan" (センちゃん), (Note: Also spelt as Senchan.) is the eccentric, yet calmest and smartest member, of the team, due in part to his ability to think things through and being able to do his best thinking while in a handstand, which he considers his "thinking pose". Sen-chan serves as Deka Green (デカグリーン, Deka Gurīn). The oldest of seven siblings from a poor family, he displays nycto- and claustrophobia after accidentally falling into a well when he was a child. He was subsequently rescued by a policeman, which inspired him to take up police work. Despite his usually calm demeanor, he is said to be scary when angered. He also develops a crush on his teammate Umeko, but avoids showing it publicly. As of the crossover film Mahō Sentai Magiranger vs. Dekaranger, they have moved in together.

As Deka Green, Sen-chan wields the D-Knuckle and D-Rod, which can combine to form the D-Blaster (ディーブラスター, Dī Burasutā) rifle. He also shares riding the Machine Bull (マシンブル, Mashin Buru) police car with Umeko. Using the D-Rod, Sen-chan can perform the Green Crash (グリーンクラッシュ, Gurīn Kurasshu) attack.

Sen-chan is portrayed by Yousuke Itou (伊藤 陽佑, Itō Yōsuke). As a child, he is portrayed by Kengo Tajima (田島 健吾, Tajima Kengo).

==== Jasmine ====
Marika Reimon (礼紋 茉莉花, Reimon Marika), also known as "Jasmine" (ジャスミン, Jasumin), is a calm and collected psychic, or "ESPer", who serves as Deka Yellow (デカイエロー, Deka Ierō). In the past, she suffered from depression over her then-inability to control her abilities and contemplated suicide by allowing an Alienizer to kill her. However, she was rescued and recruited by Doggie Kruger. In the present, she is good friends with her teammate Umeko, with whom she forms a tag-team called the Twin Cam Angels (ツインカム・エンジェル, Tsuin Kamu Enjeru). As of the direct-to-video anniversary special Tokusou Sentai Dekaranger: 10 Years After, Jasmine is married and has a son named Taiga (大我). (Note: The name of her son is revealed in the web-exclusive special Hero Mama League.)

Jasmine's ESPer abilities allow her to pick up on sensory impressions of others by handling an object connected to them or visiting a location her target has been to, though overuse of her powers exhausts her. To control her powers, she wears gloves. Furthermore, as a result of breast-feeding her son during the direct-to-video anniversary special Tokusou Sentai Dekaranger: 10 Years After, Jasmine temporarily gained the ability to teleport herself to any part of the universe, which she loses as of the direct-to-video anniversary special Tokusou Sentai Dekaranger 20th: Fireball Booster. In the crossover film Mahō Sentai Magiranger vs. Dekaranger, she displays the ability to break the fourth wall.

As Deka Yellow, Jasmine wields the D-Knuckle and the D-Stick (ディースティック, Dī Sutikku) jitte, which can combine to form the D-Shot (ディーショット, Dī Shotto) handgun and allow her to perform the Twin Cam Shot (ツインカムショット, Tsuin Kamu Shotto) attack alongside Umeko. Using the SP License, she can perform the Mirage Dimension (ミラージュディメンション, Mirāju Dimenshon) attack.

Jasmine is portrayed by Ayumi Kinoshita (木下 あゆ美, Kinoshita Ayumi). As a child, she is portrayed by Risa Asagi (浅黄 理紗, Asagi Risa).

==== Umeko ====
Koume Kodou (胡堂 小梅, Kodō Koume), (Note: Also spelt as Koume Kodo.) also known as "Umeko" (ウメコ), is a ditzy, yet kind-hearted and perky member of the team who serves as Deka Pink (デカピンク, Deka Pinku), though she frequently claims to be the field leader. Throughout the series, she spends every moment she can in a bubble bath with her three rubber ducks, Umeyo, Umenosuke, and Umegoro. After learning of Sen-chan's feelings for her, she moves in with him, as of the crossover film Mahō Sentai Magiranger vs. Dekaranger.

As Deka Pink, Umeko wields the D-Knuckle and D-Stick, which can combine to form the D-Shot and allow her to perform the Twin Cam Shot alongside Jasmine. Using the SP License's Masquerade Mode (マスカレイドモード, Masukareido Mōdo), she can instantaneously change her outfit for disguise purposes.

Umeko is portrayed by Mika Kikuchi (菊地 美香, Kikuchi Mika).

==== Tetsu ====
Tekkan Aira (姶良 鉄幹, Aira Tekkan), also known as "Tetsu" (テツ), is an elite officer from S.P.D.'s Tokkyou (特キョウ, Tokkyō) (Note: "Tokkyou" is an abbreviation for Tokubetsu Shitei Kyōaku Hanzai Taisaku Sōsakan (特別指定凶悪犯罪対策捜査官, Counter Special Criminal Investigators).) division, serving as the white-colored Deka Break (デカブレイク, Deka Bureiku), who was sent to Earth to delete the Hells Siblings and stayed on Earth to help the Earth unit. As a child, Tetsu's parents were killed by an Alienizer named Genio, before Tetsu was taken off-world and raised by S.P.D. Due in part to this, he is initially distant from the other Dekarangers, but eventually befriends them.

In battle, Tetsu is a practitioner of the fighting style Justice Fist Accel Blow (正拳アクセルブロー, Seiken Akuseru Burō), a martial art that all Tokkyou officers train in to better handle their equipment and battle particularly deadly Alienizers. Unlike the primary Dekarangers, he wields the Bracerottle (ブレスロットル, Buresurottoru), which functions as an SP License, can double as a life-support system and a fire extinguisher, and allows him to perform a variety of specialized Fist (フィスト, Fisuto) attacks. He also rides the Machine Boxer (マシンボクサー, Mashin Bokusā) police motorcycle.

During the events of the crossover film GoGo Sentai Boukenger vs. Super Sentai, Tetsu, among other veteran Sentai warriors, is recruited by Boukenger member Eiji Takaoka to help him rescue his allies and defeat the Time Demon, Chronos. In the direct-to-video anniversary special Tokusou Sentai Dekaranger: 10 Years After, Tetsu becomes the new head of S.P.D.'s Earth unit, following Doggie Kruger being framed for murder, and assists in clearing his predecessor's name.

Tetsu is portrayed by Tomokazu Yoshida (吉田 友一, Yoshida Tomokazu). As a child, he is portrayed by Yuta Komuro (小室 優太, Komuro Yūta).

=== Deka Base ===
The Deka Base (デカベース, Deka Bēsu) is the primary headquarters and base of operations of the S.P.D. Earth unit. It is equipped with Base Beams (ベースビーム, Bēsu Bīmu) and houses the Deka Machines. Additionally, the Deka Base can transform into either the Deka Base Crawler (デカベースクローラー, Deka Bēsu Kurōrā), which is equipped with the Crawler Beam (クローラービーム, Kurōrā Bīmu) cannons, or the humanoid Deka Base Robo (デカベースロボ, Deka Bēsu Robo), which is equipped with Finger Missiles (フィンガーミサイル, Fingā Misairu) and Knee Brace Beams (ニーブレスビーム, Nī Buresu Bīmu). Deka Base Robo's finisher is the Volcanic Buster (ヴォルカニック・バスター, Vorukanikku Basutā).

As of the direct-to-video anniversary special Tokusou Sentai Dekaranger: 10 Years After, the Deka Base has been rebuilt and renamed the Neo Deka Base (ネオデカベース, Neo Deka Bēsu). As of the direct-to-video anniversary special Tokusou Sentai Dekaranger 20th: Fireball Booster, the Neo Deka Base has been rebuilt and renamed the Shin Neo Deka Base (シン・ネオデカベース, Shin Neo Deka Bēsu).

==== Deka Machines ====
The Deka Machines (デカマシン, Deka Mashin) are the primary Dekarangers' mecha that are dispatched from the Deka Base.

- Pat Striker (パトストライカー, Pato Sutoraikā): Deka Red's personal six-wheeled, police car-themed Deka Machine that forms the head and torso of Dekaranger Robo. It is also equipped with a pair of Striker Arms (ストライカーアーム, Sutoraikā Āmu), which allow it to wield the Judgement Sword (ジャッジメントソード, Jajjimento Sōdo) in its Driving Sword (ドライビングソード, Doraibingu Sōdo) formation.
- Pat Gyrer (パトジャイラー, Pato Jairā): Deka Blue's personal autogyro-themed Deka Machine that forms the left leg of Dekaranger Robo. It is also equipped with the Gyro Vulcan (ジャイロバルカン, Jairo Barukan) Gatling guns, the Gyro Wapper (ジャイロワッパー, Jairo Wappā) handcuffs, and the Magnet Wire (マグネワイヤー, Magune Waiyā).
- Pat Trailer (パトレーラー, Patorērā): Deka Green's personal armored semi-trailer truck-themed Deka Machine that forms the right leg of Dekaranger Robo. It also carries the Judgement Sword and the Signal Cannon (シグナルキャノン, Shigunaru Kyanon) into battle.
- Pat Armor (パトアーマー, Pato Āmā): Deka Yellow's personal armored car-themed Deka Machine that forms the right arm of Dekaranger Robo. It is also equipped with floodlights, which allow it to perform the Armor Attack (アーマーアタック, Āmā Atakku) and Light Flash (ライトフラッシュ, Raito Furasshu) attacks.
- Pat Signer (パトシグナー, Pato Shigunā): Deka Pink's personal buggy-themed Deka Machine that forms the left arm of Dekaranger Robo. It is also equipped with a large retractable signboard.

==== Deka Bike ====
The Deka Bike (デカバイク, Deka Baiku) is Deka Break's personal police motorcycle-themed mecha that can be ridden by Dekaranger Robo in the Riding Dekaranger Robo (ライディングデカレンジャーロボ, Raidingu Dekarenjā Robo) formation, which allows them to perform the Riding Justice Flasher (ライディングジャスティスフラッシャー, Raidingu Jasutisu Furasshā) attack via the Signal Cannon. It can also assume a humanoid form called Deka Bike Robo (デカバイクロボ, Deka Baiku Robo) via Tokusou Transformation (特捜変形, Tokusō Henkei) where it is equipped with the twin wrist-mounted Sleeve Sword (スリーブソード, Surību Sōdo) blades. Its finisher is the Sword Tornado (ソードトルネード, Sōdo Torunēdo).

==== Pat Wings ====
The Pat Wings (パトウィング, Pato Wingu) are aircraft-themed mecha that Swan designed to work in conjunction with the primary Dekarangers' S.W.A.T. Modes.

- Pat Wing I (パトウィング1, Pato Wingu Wan): Deka Red's personal fighter jet–themed Pat Wing that forms the head, torso, and upper legs of Deka Wing Robo. It also possesses the highest speed and mobility.
- Pat Wing II (パトウィング2, Pato Wingu Tsū): Deka Blue's personal VTOL-themed Pat Wing that forms the arms of Deka Wing Robo. It also possesses hovering capabilities, high stability, and wingtip blasters.
- Pat Wing III (パトウィング3, Pato Wingu Surī): Deka Green's personal cargo jet–themed Pat Wing that forms the lower legs of Deka Wing Robo. It is also highly confidential, making it suitable for the conveyance of dangerous goods.
- Pat Wing IV (パトウィング4, Pato Wingu Fō): Deka Yellow's personal stealth bomber–themed Pat Wing that forms the right foot of Deka Wing Robo. It also possesses high stealth and endurance capabilities, and is equipped with special arms such as flares and tear gas bombs.
- Pat Wing V (パトウィング5, Pato Wingu Faibu): Deka Pink's personal water bomber–themed Pat Wing that forms the left foot of Deka Wing Robo. It is also equipped with a speaker and fire-extinguishing capabilities.

==== Blast Buggy ====
The Blast Buggy (ブラストバギー, Burasuto Bagī) is a combat vehicle–themed mecha from S.P.D.'s Planet Leslie branch that Deka Break pilots during the events of the film Tokusou Sentai Dekaranger The Movie: Full Blast Action.

==== Tokusou Combinations ====
The Dekarangers' Deka Machines and Pat Wings can be assembled into giant robots via Tokusou Combination (特捜合体, Tokusō Gattai).

- Dekaranger Robo (デカレンジャーロボ, Dekarenjā Robo): The Dekarangers' first giant robot composed of the Deka Machines that wields the Gyro Wapper, Judgement Sword, and Signal Cannon. Its finishers are the Justice Flasher (ジャスティスフラッシャー, Jasutisu Furasshā) via the Signal Cannon and the Judgement Crash (ジャッジメントクラッシュ, Jajjimento Kurasshu) via the Judgement Sword.
  - Super Dekaranger Robo (スーパーデカレンジャーロボ, Gattai Sūpā Dekarenjā Robo): The Super Tokusou Combination (超特捜合体, Chō Tokusō Gattai) of Dekaranger Robo and the Deka Bike that is equipped with a series of boosters. Its finishers are the Gatling Punch (ガトリングパンチ, Gatoringu Panchi) and the Dynamite Upper (ダイナマイトアッパー, Dainamaito Appā).
  - Dekaranger Robo Full Blast Custom (デカレンジャーロボ フルブラストカスタム, Dekarenjā Robo Furu Burasuto Kasutamu): The Tokusou Armament (特捜武装, Tokusō Busō) of Dekaranger Robo and the Blast Buggy that wields the Blast Launcher (ブラストランチャー, Burasuto Ranchā) and the Blast Shield (ブラストシールド, Burasuto Shīrudo), which can either be used separately to perform the Spinning Blast (スピニングブラスト, Supiningu Burasuto) attack or combine into the Full Blast Launcher (フルブラストランチャー, Furu Burasuto Ranchā) to perform the Full Blast (フルブラスト, Furu Burasuto) finisher. This combination appears exclusively in the film Tokusou Sentai Dekaranger The Movie: Full Blast Action.
- Deka Wing Robo (デカウィングロボ, Deka Wingu Robo): The Dekarangers' second giant robot composed of the Pat Wings that dual wields the twin Pat Magnum (パトマグナム, Pato Magunamu) handguns, specializes in aerial and zero-g combat, and can perform the Double Heel Smash (ダブルヒールスマッシュ, Daburu Hīru Sumasshu) attack. It can also transform further into the Deka Wing Cannon (デカウィングキャノン, Deka Wingu Kyanon) to perform the Final Buster (ファイナルバスター, Fainaru Basutā) finisher on its own; the All Star Ultimate Buster (オールスター・アルティメットバスター, Ōru Sutā Arutimetto Basutā) finisher with Dekaranger Robo, Deka Bike Robo, and Deka Base Robo; and the Twin Robo Ultimate Buster (ツインロボ・アルティメットバスター, Tsuin Robo Arutimetto Basutā) with Deka Bike Robo. In the crossover film Mahō Sentai Magiranger vs. Dekaranger, the Deka Wing Cannon performs the Magi Final Buster (マジファイナルバスター, Maji Fainaru Basutā) finisher alongside the Magirangers' giant robot Magi Legend.

== Recurring characters ==
=== S.P.D. ===
The Special Police Dekaranger (スペシャル・ポリス・デカレンジャー, Supesharu Porisu Dekarenjā), abbreviated as S.P.D. (エス・ピー・ディー, Esu Pī Dī), is an intergalactic police force that ensures all aliens abide by intergalactic laws, using advanced extraterrestrial technology, such as Deka Metal (デカメタル, Deka Metaru), which is used in the construction of their Dekaranger suits. Their Space Prosecution Office headquarters is based on Planet Gowashichoru, which is affected by a form of time dilation called the Sion Morse effect, causing it to move faster than the rest of the universe. When the Dekarangers judge an Alienizer, an eight-month trial, which is the equivalent of ten seconds on Earth, takes place on Gowashichoru to determine the criminal's innocence or guilt in a particular crime.

==== Doggie Kruger ====
Anubian Doggie Kruger (アヌビス星人ドギー・クルーガー, Anubisu Seijin Dogī Kurūgā), (Note: Also spelt as Doggy Kruger and Doggy Krueger.) also known as "Boss" (ボス, Bosu) to several of his subordinates, is from Planet Anubis and is the tough-yet-honorable superintendent of the Space Police's Metropolitan Police, as well as chief of its Earth branch. While operating as a Dekaranger in his younger years, he earned a legendary reputation as "Hell's Guard Dog" (地獄の番犬, Jigoku no Banken), due in part to his willingness to do anything to save those he cares about. Despite this, he displays feelings for his assistant Swan and panics whenever he hears she has an admirer.

During the events of the direct-to-video anniversary special Tokusou Sentai Dekaranger: 10 Years After, Kruger investigated the alleged corruption of his superior Kight Reidlich, and was framed for murder and held captive for two years before his team rescues him in the present. Soon after, Kruger admits his feelings for Swan.

In battle, Kruger is a practitioner of the Galaxy Sword-Style (銀河一刀流, Ginga Ittō-ryū) where he learned the style's secret technique, the Vega Impulse (ベガインパルス, Bega Inparusu). Though he is capable of destroying 100 foes without being defeated, he suffered from a spinal problem that caused him to miss once every 2000 attacks until being cured by chiropractor Yukito Sanjyo of the Abarangers. Additionally, utilizing a variant of the SP License called the Master License (マスターライセンス, Masutā Raisensu), Kruger can transform into the black-colored Deka Master (デカマスター, Deka Masutā). While transformed, he wields the D-Sword Vega (ディーソード・ベガ, Dī Sōdo Bega), which possesses a gun function and can be used to perform either the Vega Tornado Slash (ベガトルネードスラッシュ, Bega Torunēdo Surasshu) attack or the Vega Slash (ベガスラッシュ, Bega Surasshu) finisher. He also rides the S.P.D. Helicopter (S.P.D.ヘリコプター, Esu Pī Dī Herikoputā).

Doggie Kruger is voiced by Tetsu Inada (稲田 徹, Inada Tetsu).

==== Swan Shiratori ====
Cignian Swan Shiratori (チーニョ星人 白鳥 スワン, Chīnyo Seijin Shiratori Suwan) is Kruger's intellectually and technologically gifted assistant from Planet Cigno who provides the Dekarangers with their arsenal. While she possesses a variant of the SP License called the Swan License (スワンライセンス, Suwan Raisensu), which grants her the ability to transform into the orange-colored Deka Swan (デカスワン, Deka Suwan), she has a personal policy to only do so once every four years, except for emergencies.

As Deka Swan, she can perform either the Swan Illusion (スワンイリュージョン, Suwan Iryūjon) attack or the Swan Rainbow (スワンレインボー, Suwan Reinbō) finisher.

Swan Shiratori is portrayed by Mako Ishino (石野 真子, Ishino Mako).

==== Murphy K-9 ====
Murphy K-9 (マーフィーK9, Māfī Kē Nain) is a robotic police dog that is used to track criminals and objects using his enhanced sense of smell. He is loyal to the Dekarangers, especially Umeko, and can transform into the D-Bazooka (ディーバズーカ, Dī Bazūka) via the Key Bone (キーボーン, Kī Bōn) to help them delete Alienizers. As of the crossover film Mahō Sentai Magiranger vs. Dekaranger, Murphy was transferred to the Fire Squad and upgraded with the ability to transform into Ban's Battlizer Mode.

==== Other members ====
- Octian Porupo (オクト星人ポルポ, Okuto Seijin Porupo): An octopus-themed member of S.P.D., and Ban's former instructor from Planet Octo, who feels his student should be removed from S.P.D. due to his recklessness. Porupo is voiced by Issei Futamata (二又 一成, Futamata Issei).
- Horusian Numa-O (ホルス星人ヌマ・O, Numa Ō): The professional avian supreme commander of S.P.D. from Planet Horus. Numa-O is voiced by Kazuhiko Kishino (岸野 一彦, Kishino Kazuhiko).
- Tortorian Buntar (トート星人ブンター, Tōto Seijin Buntā): An ape-themed member of S.P.D., and old friend of Kruger's, from Planet Torto, who owns a mechanical dog named Clarence K-9 (クラレンスK9, Kurarensu Kē Nain) and trains the Dekarangers to assume their S.W.A.T. Modes. Buntar is voiced by Naoki Kusumi (楠見 尚己, Kusumi Naoki).
- Lumierian Lisa Teagle (リュミエル星人リサ・ティーゲル, Ryumieru Seijin Risa Tīgeru): The chief of the Tokkyou Division's first squad from Planet Lumiere, and Tetsu's mentor, who believes that the perfect officer must be passionless to be efficient. Additionally, using her own Bracerottle, she can transform into the silver-colored Deka Bright (デカブライト, Deka Buraito). After coming to Earth, she initially intended to take Tetsu back for straying from her teachings, but decides against that after seeing him fight, realizing that passion can be a positive trait for an officer. Lisa Teagle is portrayed by Mie Nanamori (七森 美江, Nanamori Mie).
- Leonian Gyoku Rou (レオン星人ギョク・ロウ, Reon Seijin Gyoku Rō): Ban's leonine predecessor, from Planet Leon, who was meant to become Deka Red on Earth, but was badly injured while protecting Jasmine and Hoji from an Alienizer called Terry X, which seemingly forced Rou to retire. In reality, he was tasked by Numa-O to go underground and prepare an elite team called the Fire Squad (ファイヤースクワッド, Faiyā Sukuwaddo). In the present, after being forced out of hiding when Terry X resurfaces, Rou recruits Ban in recognition of his fiery passion and drive for crime-fighting. Gyoku Rou is voiced by Daisuke Namikawa (浪川 大輔, Namikawa Daisuke).

=== Alienizers ===
Space Criminal Alienizers (宇宙犯罪者アリエナイザー, Uchū Hanzaisha Arienaizā) is an umbrella term that S.P.D. gives to aliens that commit various crimes on Earth and other planets. Unlike most monsters in the Super Sentai franchise, many of the Alienizers pilot giant robots called Kaijuki (怪重機, Kaijūki; "Monstrous Heavy Industrial Machines"), (Note: "Kaijuki" is a combination of the Japanese words kaijū (怪獣, "monster") and jūki (重機, "heavy industrial machine").) which are usually provided by Agent Abrella.

==== Agent Abrella ====
Rainian Agent Abrella (レイン星人エージェント・アブレラ, Rein Seijin Ējento Aburera) is a bat-themed arms dealer from Planet Rain and an infamous figure in the intergalactic black market who is known for causing wars in seven galaxies, destroying billions of lives in the process. As his homeworld's name suggests, it is perpetually raining, forcing him to wear a special helmet that produces an artificial rainy environment to sustain himself on other worlds. After arriving on Earth, he offers his services, as well as Mechanoids and Kaijuki, to his fellow Alienizers for the right price. Initially staying in the shadows, Abrella gathers information on the Deka Base from clients who have successfully infiltrated it and escaped with their lives while planning to eventually realize his desire for a "world of...currency and crime". After eventually making his presence known to the Dekarangers and losing a Browgoul he intended to raise to them, Abrella starts taking their interference personally and launches a failed smear campaign against them. Following this, Abrella takes advantage of the Dekarangers' fight with the Alienizer Jellyfis to break four Alienizers out of prison and lead them in taking over the Deka Base. From there, he uses Deka Base Robo to go on a rampage, lure the bulk of S.P.D.'s forces to Earth, and uses their planetary forcefield against them. While the Dekarangers eventually retake Deka Base Robo and use the D-Bazooka to delete Abrella, he was succeeded by his pupil, Agent X, as of the crossover film Mahō Sentai Magiranger vs. Dekaranger.

In the direct-to-video anniversary special Tokusou Sentai Dekaranger: 10 Years After, Kight Reidlich cloned a giant version of Abrella that he kept on Planet Highgord to help him fight the Dekarangers. However, Clone Abrella is killed by Dekaranger Robo piloted by Deka Break.

Throughout the series, Abrella pilots the following Kaijuki as part of his schemes:

- Big Drawer II (ビグドローワー2, Bigu Dorōwā Tsū): A chest-of-drawers-themed Super Kaijuki that he uses in his smear campaign against the Dekarangers before it is destroyed by Deka Base Robo.
- Abtrex (アブトレックス, Abutorekkusu): Abrella's personal Kaijuki that can assume the Abtrailer (アブトレーラー, Abutorērā) drill-vehicle mode. He tasks the Alienizer Angorl with using it to attack the Deka Base and damage Dekaranger Robo before the Kaijuki is destroyed by Deka Bike Robo and the Deka Wing Cannon. During the events of the crossover film Mahō Sentai Magiranger vs. Dekaranger, Agent X pilots the succeeding model, Abotrex (アボトレックス, Abotorekkusu), before it is blasted into space by Magi Legend and the Deka Wing Cannon and destroyed by Magi King, Dekaranger Robo, Travelion, and Deka Bike Robo.

Abrella is voiced by Ryūsei Nakao (中尾 隆聖, Nakao Ryūsei).

==== Mechanoids ====
The Mechanoids (メカ人間, Meka Ningen) are android foot soldiers created by Abrella and used by the Alienizers whom he offers his services to that emerge from grenade-like canisters.

- Anaroids (アーナロイド, Ānaroido): Asteroid-themed androids that wield blasters and swords. The Anaroids are voiced by Katsumi Shiono (塩野 勝美, Shiono Katsumi) and Yuuki Anai (穴井 勇輝, Anai Yūki).
- Batsuroids (バーツロイド, Bātsuroido): Planet-themed androids that lead the Anaroids and wield hand-mounted guns and, later, swords. Throughout the series, the Batsuroids pilot Kaijuki such as the chest of drawers-themed Super Kaijuki (超巨大怪重機, Chōkyodai Kaijūki) Big Drawer (ビグドローワー, Bigu Dorōwā), which is capable of storing buildings, the flight-capable Hunter Jet 2 (ハンタージェット2, Hantā Jetto Tsū), the angel-themed Megaroria (メガロリア), and the knight-themed Knight Chaser (ナイトチェイサー, Naito Cheisā) before being destroyed by Deka Base Robo, confiscated by the Dekarangers for use in a sting operation, destroyed by Deka Bike Robo, and destroyed by Super Dekaranger Robo respectively. The Batsuroids are voiced by Katsumi Shiono and Yuuki Anai.
- Igaroids (イーガロイド, Īgaroido): Star-themed androids that are able to speak human languages, lead the Anaroids and Batsuroids, and primarily wield swords that allow them to perform the Cross Burst (クロスバースト, Kurosu Bāsuto) attack. The Igaroids are voiced by Kazuya Nakai (中井 和哉, Nakai Kazuya).

==== Minor Alienizers ====
- Lovelian Balance (ラブーリ星人バラン・スー, Rabūri Seijin Baran Sū): A giant non-humanoid Copepod alien from Planet Lovely who smuggled the Fan Crusher's control mechanism for Don Moyaida, who subsequently betrayed him. In a fit of rage, Balance takes a bus and its occupants hostage, but is easily defeated and arrested by Deka Blue, Green, Yellow, and Pink.
- Diamantian Don Moyaida (ディアマンテ星人ドン・モヤイダ, Diamante Seijin Don Moyaida): A diamond-themed criminal from Planet Diamante who is charged with infanticide, vehicular manslaughter, and the theft of terrestrial resources. He was originally believed to have died following a car chase with Ban in his combat vehicle-themed Kaijuki, Scarabader (スカラベーダー, Sukarabēdā), but Don Moyaida resurfaces on Earth disguised as a human to use his primary drill vehicle–like Kaijuki, Fan Crusher (ファンクラッシャー, Fan Kurasshā), to harvest the planet's resources and produce space jewelry as well as give Agent Abrella information on the Deka Base's Anubisium, the material used in its walls' construction. Don Moyaida succeeds in the latter task before he is deleted by Deka Red, while the Fan Crusher is destroyed by Dekaranger Robo. Don Moyaida is voiced by Takanori Kikuchi (菊池 隆則, Kikuchi Takanori), who also portrays his human form.
- Grorserian Hell Heaven (グローザ星人ヘルヘヴン, Gurōza Seijin Heru Hevun): A bison-themed criminal and underling of Kevakia from Planet Grorser who is charged with kidnapping for profit-making and murder in Star-29. Hell Heaven pilots a lobster/fiddler crab–themed Kaijuki called Devil Capture (デビルキャプチャー, Debiru Kyapuchā) in an attempt to kidnap Princess Erika and distract the Dekarangers, but is deleted by Deka Blue while Devil Capture is destroyed by the Pat Striker in its Driving Sword formation. Hell Heaven is voiced by Keikō Sakai (酒井 敬幸, Sakai Keikō).
- Rikomoian Kevakia (リコモ星人ケバキーア, Rikomo Seijin Kebakīa): A digitally-based chameleon-themed being from Planet Rikomo who is capable of traveling through the internet and emerging from computers, but is powerless outside of one. He uses Hell Heaven to distract the Dekarangers while he kidnaps Princess Erika and ransoms her for her family's Wellness Stone. His physical body is deleted by Deka Red and Blue, but he successfully transfers his data into his personal Kaijuki, Devil Capture 2 (デビルキャプチャー2, Debiru Kyapuchā Tsū), and becomes its AI. Nevertheless, he is destroyed by Dekaranger Robo. Kevakia is voiced by Kōji Tobe (戸部 公爾, Tobe Kōji).
- Anrian Beildon (アンリ星人ベイルドン, Anri Seijin Beirudon): A rhinoceros-themed criminal from Planet Anri who possesses an armored body and is charged with mass-murder on five planets. While working for the scientist Mano Mark, Beildon turns humans into gasoline for a share of his employer's profits and commits bank robberies to help Mark fund his work until the latter is deleted by the Dekarangers via the D-Bazooka. Beildon is voiced by Kenta Miyake (三宅 健太, Miyake Kenta).
- Ridomihan Kersus (リドミハ星人カーサス, Ridomiha Seijin Kāsasu): A leaf-themed criminal from Planet Ridomiha who is charged with murder and planetary invasion and is capable of secreting healing liquid from her stalks and producing high-powered water streams capable of slicing objects. Due to their homeworld changing from a water-based planet to a desert-based one, she and her sister Karmia (カーミア, Kāmia) scouted Earth with the intention of stealing its water. After Karmia developed second thoughts, Kersus killed her and framed an alien named Braidy, but Sen-Chan discovers the truth before the Dekarangers delete Kersus with the D-Bazooka. Kersus is voiced by Tomoka Hayashi (林 知花, Hayashi Tomoka), who also portrays her human form.
- Cuwartlian Dazgonelr (クウォータ星人ダゴネール, Kuwōta Seijin Dagonēru): A childish 10,708-year-old octopus-themed Alienizer from Planet Cuwartl who is charged with turning people into dolls. He manipulates Hikaru, a lonely boy with the power to teleport objects, into helping him before he is deleted by Dekaranger Robo while piloting the Kaijuki Embarns (エンバーンズ, Enbānzu). Dazgonelr is voiced by Yasuhiro Takato (高戸 靖広, Takato Yasuhiro).
- Zamzarlian Shaikeel (ザムザ星人シェイク, Zamuza Seijin Sheiku): A beetle-themed criminal and bomb manufacturer from Planet Zamuza who was arrested on charges of mass-murder via explosives and imprisoned in the Prison Satellite Prisron (監獄衛生プリズロン, Kangoku Eisei Purizuron). After escaping in the present, he seeks out his ex-girlfriend Myra and pilots a ninja-themed Kaijuki called Shinobi Shadow (シノビシャドー, Shinobi Shadō) to stop the Dekarangers, who destroy the Kaijuki with Dekaranger Robo before deleting Shaikeel with the D-Bazooka. Sheik is voiced by Hideaki Kusaka (日下 秀昭, Kusaka Hideaki).
- Bileezian Vino (ビリーザ星人ヴィーノ, Birīza Seijin Vīno): An old academy friend of Hoji's from Planet Bileez who retired from S.P.D. out of disenchantment, was lured into a criminal lifestyle by the money he earned from his skills, became a mercenary, reconfigured his body into a monstrous form, and assumed the identity of the firearm-themed Gigandes (ギガンテス, Gigantesu) to commit indiscriminate mass murder. In the present, he is hired by Ben G and Agent Abrella to assassinate Kruger and retrieve information on the Deka Base, respectively. Vino succeeds in the latter task before he enlarges himself and is deleted by Dekaranger Robo. Vino is voiced by Naoya Gomoto (郷本 直也, Gōmoto Naoya), who also portrays his original form.
- Kajimerian Ben G (カジメリ星人ベン・G, Kajimeri Seijin Ben G): A criminal from Planet Kajimeri who was charged with mass-murder and swore revenge on Kruger, following a near-death experience amidst a chase between them that turned the former into a cyborg. As part of his revenge, Ben G tasks a Batsuroid with piloting a drill-themed Kaijuki called Terrible Terror (テリブルテーラー, Teriburu Tērā) to distract the Dekarangers while he infiltrates the Deka Base and kidnaps Swan Shiratori. Terrible Terror is destroyed by Dekaranger Robo, while Ben G is deleted by Deka Master. During the events of the crossover film Tokusou Sentai Dekaranger vs. Abaranger, Trinoid #0 Saunaginnan resurrects Ben G, who is subsequently killed by Deka Pink, Deka Break, Deka Master, and Abare Killer. Ben G is voiced by Nobuyuki Hiyama (檜山 修之, Hiyama Nobuyuki).
- Cristonian Ferley (クリスト星人ファーリー, Kurisuto Seijin Fārī): A werewolf/vampire bat–themed criminal from Planet Cristo who is charged with burglary and murdering several S.P.D. officers. As his body is photosensitive, he tasks a Batsuroid with piloting a Kaijuki called Devil Capture 4 (デビルキャプチャー4, Debiru Kyapuchā Fō) to distract the Dekarangers while Ferley locates and eats a mineral called Lunar Metal so he can roam freely in daylight. Devil Capture 4 is destroyed by Dekaranger Robo while Ferley is deleted by the Dekarangers via the D-Bazooka. In the direct-to-video special Tokusou Sentai Dekaranger Super Video: Super Finisher Match! Deka Red vs. Deka Break, a variation of Ferley called Burning Ferley (バーニング・ファーリー, Bāningu Fārī) appears as part of a simulation training session. Ferley is voiced by Hisao Egawa (江川 央生, Egawa Hisao).
- Titarnian Metiussl (ティタン星人メテウス, Titan Seijin Meteusu): A brutal flame/astronaut–themed criminal and self-proclaimed "Destroyer King" (破壊王, Hakaiō) from Planet Titarn who seeks out an android girl named Flora, whom he created to control his giant creation Machine Monster Gigas (マシンモンスター・ギーガス, Mashin Monsutā Gīgasu). He tasks a Batsuroid with piloting a gladiator-themed Kaijuki called Cannon Gladiator (キャノングラディエーター, Kyanon Guradiētā) and attacking the Deka Base while he locates Flora. Metiussl is eventually deleted by Deka Master while Cannon Gladiator is eaten by Gigas, which is subsequently destroyed by Deka Base Robo. Metiussl is voiced by Hisanori Koyatsu (小谷津 央典, Koyatsu Hisanori).
- Ozchuian Ial (オズチュウ星人イーアル, Ozuchū Seijin Īaru): A kung fu/Drunken Master–themed criminal from Planet Ozchu who is charged with medical violations and homicide, can strengthen himself by drinking alcohol, carries a bottle of Earth sake, and possesses a fighting style tailored to how drunk he is. He poses as a restaurateur named Wang (ワン, Wan) until he is confronted by Umeko, enlarges himself, and is deleted by Dekaranger Robo. Ial is voiced by Dandy Sakano (ダンディ坂野, Dandi Sakano), who also portrays Wang.
- Woojonian Jinche (ウージョン星人ジンチェ, Wūjon Seijin Jinche): A criminal from Planet Woojon who possesses the ability to swap bodies with another and is wanted on seven planets on burglary and vandalism charges. After being captured by S.P.D. while using a Kaijuki called Shinobi Shadow 2 (シノビシャドー2, Shinobi Shadō Tsū), which was destroyed by Deka Base Robo, he attempts to take over the Deka Base for himself and reveal its secrets to Agent Abrella by switching bodies with Hoji, only to partially succeed in the latter task before he is returned to his original body and deleted by the Dekarangers via the D-Bazooka. Jinche is voiced by Yukitoshi Hori (堀 之紀, Hori Yukitoshi).
- Guermerlian Byz Goa (ゲルマー星人バイズ・ゴア, Gerumā Seijin Baizu Goa): A tiny planetary grey alien/gamer-themed bomber and destroyer of worlds, from Planet Geurmerl. He plants several bombs on Earth and challenges S.P.D.'s Earth unit to find them as part of a game he played on previous planets before he destroyed them while using his tiny size to hide. After Ban finds him disguised as a walkie-talkie, Byz Goa retaliates by piloting a Kaijuki called Cannon Gladiator 2 (キャノングラディエーター2, Kyanon Guradiētā Tsū), only to be deleted by Dekaranger Robo. Byz Goa is voiced by Tomokazu Seki (関 智一, Seki Tomokazu).
- Dradian Goldom (ドラド星人ゴルドム, Dorado Seijin Gorudomu): An unspecified reptile-themed criminal from Planet Drad who kidnaps Attika Alpachi's son to force him into taking a city block hostage while Goldom robs a nearby bank in the confusion, only for the Dekarangers to realize the truth. Goldom attempts to escape in his Kaijuki, Terrible Terror 2 (テリブルテーラー2, Teriburu Tērā Tsū), but is deleted by Deka Bike Robo. Goldom is voiced by Takaya Kuroda (黒田 崇矢, Kuroda Takaya).
- Amoreian Baachiyo (アモーレ星人バーチョ, Amōre Seijin Bacho): A hermaphroditic spider-themed criminal and stalker from Planet Amore who possesses four tendrils capable of firing spider silk-like threads to restrain targets and whose people earned a reputation for being overly passionate and "too in love". Following a brief encounter with Tetsu while the officer was working undercover as a woman, falling in love with "her", and eventually metamorphosing from his powerless immature form to his stronger adult form, Baachiyo stalks Swan Shiratori with the belief that she was the person he fell in love with. Upon learning it was Tetsu, Baachiyo attempts to force himself on the officer before the Dekarangers arrest the alien. Baachiyo is voiced by Motomu Kiyokawa (清川元夢, Kiyokawa Motomu) in his immature form and Taiki Matsuno (松野 太紀, Matsuno Taiki) in his adult form.
- Spiritian Byoi (スピリト星人ビョーイ, Supirito Seijin Byōi): A gas-based criminal from Planet Spirit who is capable of possessing other beings. He secretly possesses Ban, but is forced out by Hakutaku. Byoi retaliates by piloting a cyclops-themed flight-capable Kaijuki called Hunter Jet (ハンタージェット, Hantā Jetto), but is deleted by Deka Bike Robo. Byoi is voiced by Katsumi Shiono.
- Beesian Beeling (ビース星人ビーリング, Bīsu Seijin Bīringu): A lizard-themed fighter, from Planet Bees, in Durden's illegal fight club who consumes the illegal steroid Megagesterine and fights Hoji and Tetsu. Beeling is voiced by Yoshimitsu Shimoyama (下山 吉光, Shimoyama Yoshimitsu). (Note: Beesian Beeling is a rebuilt and modified version of Kasukedon from B-Robo Kabutack.)
- Barigean Milibar (バリゲ星人ミリバル, Barige Seijin Miribaru): A aerokinetic cycloptic typhoon-themed thief and serial killer from Planet Barige who previously robbed criminals to raise money for orphans before he became reckless. He enlarges himself, but is deleted by Super Dekaranger Robo. During the events of the crossover film Tokusou Sentai Dekaranger vs. Abaranger, Saunaginnan resurrects Milibar, who is subsequently killed by Deka Red, Deka Blue, Deka Green, and Abare Yellow. Milibar is voiced by Masaru Ōbayashi (大林 勝, Ōbayashi Masaru), who also portrays his human form.
- Wandean Niwande (ワンデ星人ニワンデ, Wande Seijin Niwande): Milibar's unspecified bird-themed partner from Planet Wande who helped him rob criminals to raise money for helping orphans, before being incarcerated in the Prison Satellite Alcapo. Niwande is voiced by Kyousei Tsukui (津久井 教生, Tsukui Kyōsei).
- Pouchien Bolapeno (パウチ星人ボラペーノ, Pauchi Seijin Borapēno): A Noppera-bō-themed copycat criminal, and fan of Genio, from Planet Pouchie who is capable of copying others' DNA and assuming their forms and powers. He uses the forms of, and commits the same or similar crimes as, Rikmolian Kevakiear, Anrian Beildon, Ridomihan Kersus, Cuwartian Dazgonelr, Zamzarlian Shaikeel, and Reversian Blitz Hells, and rebuilds Blitz's Kaijuki, God Pounder, to gain Genio's attention before Bolapeno is deleted by Dekaranger Robo. Bolapeno is voiced by Kōichi Sakaguchi (坂口 候一, Sakaguchi Kōichi).
- Pukosian Jackil (プコス星人ジャッキル, Pukosu Seijin Jakkiru): A jackal/sniper-themed hitman from Planet Pukos who is charged with several counts of homicide. He is hired by Princess Io Yonmerluicchi's maid to assassinate the princess, but is foiled by the Dekarangers. He retaliates by piloting a Kaijuki called Cannon Gladiator 3 (キャノングラディエーター3, Kyanon Guradiētā Surī), but is deleted by Super Dekaranger Robo. Jackil is voiced by Kōichi Tōchika (遠近 孝一, Tōchika Kōichi).
- Botsian Zortac (ボッツ星人ゾータク, Bottsu Seijin Zōtaku): A scatterbrained eel-themed underling of Don Sanoa's from Planet Bots who adopts Muscle Gear, a powerful exosuit with the ability to turn its wearer invisible and invulnerable to most attacks. Zortac is deleted by the primary Dekarangers in their S.W.A.T. Modes. Zortac is voiced by Yasuhiko Kawazu (川津 泰彦, Kawazu Yasuhiko).
- Thousanian Gineka (サウザン星人ギネーカ, Sauzan Seijin Ginēka): An aristocracy-themed profligate from Planet Thousan who murdered countless innocents via his Kaijuki Million Missile (ミリオンミサイル, Mirion Misairu), which is capable of transforming into a stealth aircraft, in a specialized game he and his friends set up with a rare jewel as a marker. Gineka is deleted by the Deka Wing Cannon. Gineka is voiced by Kappei Yamaguchi (山口 勝平, Yamaguchi Kappei).
- Handorean Decho (ハンドレ星人デーチョ, Handore Seijin Dēcho) and Tentean Siroger (テンテ星人シロガー, Tente Seijin Shirogā): Gineka's hunting dog and platinum-themed accomplices from Planets Handore and Tente, respectively, who join him in his game after rebuilding Durden's and Dazgonelr's respective Kaijuki, Ultimate Evil and Embarns, before they are deleted by Deka Wing Robo. Decho and Siroger are voiced by Akimitsu Takase (高瀬 右光, Takase Akimitsu) and Junji Kitajima (北島 淳司, Kitajima Junji) respectively.
- Tenkaonian Raja Namunan (テンカオ星人ラジャ・ナムナン, Tenkao Seijin Raja Namunan): A seahorse-themed criminal from Planet Tenkao who is charged with 103 counts of burglary and who murdered Detective Chou San's daughter 13 years prior to the series, though the murder could not originally be connected to him. After he is successfully charged with the murder in the present, Namunan attempts to escape justice in his Kaijuki, Knight Chaser 2 (ナイトチェイサー2, Naito Cheisā Tsū), only to be deleted by the Deka Wing Cannon. Raja Namunan is voiced by Ryōichi Tanaka (田中 亮一, Tanaka Ryōichi).
- Tenkaonian Goren Nashi (テンカオ星人ゴレン・ナシ, Tenkao Seijin Goren Nashi) and Tenkaonian Yam Tomukun (テンカオ星人ヤム・トムクン, Tenkao Seijin Yamu Tomukun): Namunan's partners of the same species who are killed by Chou San. Goren Nashi is voiced by Seiji Fujita (藤田 清二, Fujita Seiji), who also portrays his human form; Yam Tomukun is portrayed by Minoru Nanaeda (七枝 実, Nanaeda Minoru).
- Mikean Clord (マイク星人クロード, Maiku Seijin Kurōdo): A rose-themed criminal from Planet Mike who is charged with several counts of mass murder and inhuman experimentation stemming from his stealing young women's nutrients to cure his sister Teresa, who is dating Hoji. Despite learning of Clord's goal and being initially torn over allowing him to continue, Hoji ultimately deletes him before he can kill another group of young women. Clord is voiced by Yuuki Tsujimoto (辻本 祐樹, Tsujimoto Yūki), who also portrays his human form.
- Aladonian Gyanjava (アラドン星人ギャンジャバ, Aradon Seijin Gyanjaba): A sea turtle/coral/barnacle-themed bank robber from Planet Aladon who is charged with burglary and child abduction, having killed Yaako's parents to take advantage of her natural ability to manipulate locks. After requesting Agent Abrella's help to access the Deka Base's systems, Yaako betrays Gyanjava and helps the Dekarangers foil his latest robbery. Gyanjava dons a Muscle Gear to evade capture and judgement before piloting a Kaijuki called Cannon Gladiator 4 (キャノングラディエーター4, Kaijūki Kyanon Guradiētā Fō) to crush the Dekarangers, only to be thwarted and judged by Deka Bike Robo. While Cannon Gladiator 4 is destroyed by Deka Base Robo, Gyanjava escapes from the Kaijuki, only for Yaako to disable his Muscle Gear before Deka Red S.W.A.T. Mode deletes him. Gyanjava is voiced by Yoshinori Okamoto, who also portrays his human form.
- Iyuilwerian Mime (ユイルワー星人ミーメ, Yuiruwā Seijin Mīme): A spotty-eyed stag beetle–themed criminal from Planet Yuilwer who invades young women's dreams to steal their souls and create a youth potion from them. After targeting Umeko and attempting to use a Kaijuki called Megaroria 2 (メガロリア2, Megaroria Tsū) to further her plans, she is deleted by Deka Yellow and Pink in their S.W.A.T. Modes while Megaroria 2 is destroyed by Deka Wing Robo. Mime is voiced by Michie Tomizawa (富沢 美智恵, Tomizawa Michie).
- Guirarkian Don Bianco (ギラーク星人ドン・ビアンコ, Girāku Seijin Donbianko): A white tiger–themed member of the Intergalactic Mafia from Planet Guirark, and rival of Don Blaco, who is attacked and killed by Jingi. Don Bianco is voiced by Daisuke Egawa (江川 大輔, Egawa Daisuke).
- Zabunian Don Blaco (ザブン星人ドン・ブラコ, Zabun Seijin Donburako): A lion-themed member of the Intergalactic Mafia from Planet Zabun, and rival of Don Bianco, who hires Jingi to kill Bianco, only to be killed by the assassin as well. Don Blaco is voiced by Shigenori Sōya (宗矢 樹頼, Sōya Shigenori).
- Assassinian Jingi (アサシン星人ジンギ, Asashin Seijin Jingi): A self-centered scorpion-themed assassin from Planet Assassin who has a chain on his head capable of sending targets to another dimension and who considers his skills far beyond that of typical killers, becoming murderously violent whenever someone questions or insults him. He kills indiscriminately until the Dekarangers confront him. He pilots a Kaijuki called Ultimate Evil 2 (アルティメットイビル2, Arutimetto Ibiru Tsū) in retaliation, but is deleted by the Deka Wing Cannon. Jingi is voiced by Minami Takayama (高山 みなみ, Takayama Minami).
- Sumasuleenian Nikaradar (スマスリーナ星人ニカレーダ, Sumasurīna Seijin Nikarēda): A spiky squid-themed criminal, and breeder of alien monsters called Browgoul, from Planet Sumasuleen who is capable of disguising himself as others and is willing to sacrifice countless worlds to ensure his pets' existence. After arriving on Earth, he murdered a professor and fed his corpse to a hatched Browgoul before assuming the deceased's identity to redirect a meteor towards Earth. However, the Dekarangers discover his true identity and delete him via their S.W.A.T. Modes. Nikaradar is voiced by Hiroyuki Shibamoto (柴本 浩行, Shibamoto Hiroyuki).
- Bokudenian Biskes (ボクデン星人ビスケス, Bokuden Seijin Bisukesu): A reckless archerfish/samurai-themed criminal and former friend of Kruger's from Planet Bokuden who previously trained with him, is charged with illegally challenging 999 fighters in duels to the death, and possesses the Sword Altair (ソード・アルタイル, Sōdo Arutairu), with which he can perform the Altair Slash (アルタイルスラッシュ, Arutairu Surasshu) attack. Seeking revenge against Kruger for inheriting his father's dojo, Biskes attacks the Dekarangers for their badges on Agent Abrella's behalf as part of the latter's smear campaign against them until Biskes is deleted by Deka Master. Biskes is voiced by Takeshi Kusao (草尾 毅, Kusao Takeshi).
- Sukekonian Mashu (スケコ星人マシュー, Sukeko Seijin Mashū): A fox-themed con artist from Planet Sukeko who is charged with manipulating, marrying, and killing 273 women via Psycho Mushrooms. Posing as a human named Hironobu (ヒロノブ), he targets Umeko. However, a suspicious Sen-chan confronts Mashu, who unwittingly exposes himself while bragging about his intentions before being deleted by Deka Pink S.W.A.T. Mode. Mashu is voiced by Osamu Hosoi (細井 治, Hosoi Osamu) while his human form is portrayed by Hiroyuki Matsumoto (松本 博之, Matsumoto Hiroyuki).
- Dynamoian Terry X (ダイナモ星人テリーX, Dainamo Seijin Terī Ekkusu): An inductor-themed criminal from Planet Dynamo who possesses arm-mounted, weaponized coilguns and is charged with absorbing ESPers' life forces and converting them into plasma batteries to sell on the black market, having done so across 445 planets long before S.P.D. was founded and having already been approved for deletion. Fifteen years prior, he captured then-rookies Hoji and Jasmine and nearly killed them before the pair's partner Gyoku Rou saved them and seemingly deleted Terry X. Having survived, Terry X resurfaces in the present with upgraded batteries he bought from Agent Abrella to renew his attempt to absorb Jasmine's life force, only to be overpowered by the Dekarangers. He uses his new batteries to enlarge himself, but is deleted by the Deka Wing Cannon. Terry X is voiced by Kenji Hamada (浜田 賢二, Hamada Kenji).
- Kulernian Jellyfis (クラーン星人ジェリフィス, Kurān Seijin Jerifisu): A non-humanoid Cnidaria-themed criminal from Planet Kulern who can take over human beings' nervous systems, which is forbidden by space law. He controls Ban, but Tetsu uses his own Super Electro Fist to briefly kill him, forcing Jellyfis off before Tetsu revives Ban with his Electro Fist technique. Jellyfis pilots the Kaijuki Million Missile in retaliation, but is deleted by Super Dekaranger Robo, which Agent Abrella takes advantage of to storm the Deka Base. Jellyfis is voiced by Kōzō Shioya (塩屋 浩三, Shioya Kōzō).
- Gimonian Angorl (ギモ星人アンゴール, Gimo Seijin Angōru): An anglerfish-themed criminal from Planet Gimo whom Agent Abrella broke out of prison and equipped with a Hyper Muscle Gear to assist in attacking the Deka Base via his personal Kaijuki, Abtrex, only to be deleted by the Deka Wing Cannon and Deka Bike Robo. Angorl is voiced by Keiichi Sonobe (園部 啓一, Sonobe Keiichi).
- Gedonian Uniga (ゲド星人ウニーガ, Gedo Seijin Unīga): A sea urchin–themed criminal from Planet Gedo and the inspiration behind the Igaroids whom Agent Abrella broke out of prison and equipped with a Hyper Muscle Gear to assist in attacking the Deka Base, only to be deleted by the Dekarangers. Uniga is voiced by Kazuya Nakai.
- Dragian Ganymede (ドラグ星人ガニメデ, Doragu Seijin Ganimede): A crab-themed criminal from Planet Drag whom Agent Abrella broke out of prison and equipped with a Hyper Muscle Gear to assist him in attacking the Deka Base, only to be deleted by Deka Blue and Green. Ganymede is voiced by Yūji Kishi (岸 祐二, Kishi Yūji).
- Jergonian Sukeela (ジャーゴ星人スキーラ, Jāgo Seijin Sukīra): A mantis shrimp–themed criminal from Planet Jergo whom Agent Abrella broke out of prison and equipped with a Hyper Muscle Gear to assist him in attacking the Deka Base, only to be deleted by Deka Yellow and Pink. Sukeela is voiced by Emi Shinohara (篠原 恵美, Shinohara Emi).

==== Special Criminal Alienizers ====
Special Criminal Alienizers are criminals who have committed high-profile crimes and are pursued by S.P.D.'s Tokkyou division.

- Three Hells Siblings (ヘルズ3兄弟, Herusu San Kyōdai): Three alien siblings from Planet Reversia who are wanted on 79 planets on marauding and murder charges and possess a Kaijuki called God Pounder (ゴッドパウンダー, Goddo Paundā). Their modus operandi is to have Succubus and Bon-Goblin arrive on an ideal planet first before contacting Blitz. Once they can have their fun with the planet and its inhabitants, they destroy the former and move on to another planet to repeat the process. Upon arriving on Earth however, they are pursued by Deka Break.
  - Reversian Bon-Goblin Hells (リバーシア星人ボンゴブリン・ヘルズ, Ribāshia Seijin Bon-Goburin Heruzu): A goblin-themed criminal, the middle child of the Hells Siblings, and the strongest member who possesses an insatiable hunger, poly-matter digestion capabilities, metallic fists, and a muscular body that renders him immune to most bladed weapons, though his throat is his weakest area. After enlarging himself, he is deleted by Deka Bike Robo. During the events of the crossover film Tokusou Sentai Dekaranger vs. Abaranger, Trinoid #0 Saunaginnan resurrects Bon-Goblin, who is subsequently deleted by Deka Yellow, Aba Red, Abare Blue, and Abare Black. Bon-Goblin is voiced by Toshiharu Sakurai (桜井 敏治, Sakurai Toshiharu) in the series and by Katsumi Shiono in Dekaranger vs. Abaranger.
  - Reversian Succubus Hells (リバーシア星人サキュバス・ヘルズ, Ribāshia Seijin Sakyubasu Heruzu): A humanoid succubus/snake-themed criminal and the youngest of the Hells Siblings who is capable of draining the lifeforce of those she touches. She initially attempts to use her powers on Jasmine, but learns of Jasmine's ESP and tries to make the latter her pet instead. Despite being mortally wounded by Blitz, Succubus dies transferring her lifeforce to him. During the events of the crossover film Tokusou Sentai Dekaranger vs. Abaranger, Saunaginnan revives Succubus, who is subsequently deleted by Deka Yellow, Deka Pink, and Abare Yellow. Succubus Hells is portrayed by Mayu Gamō (蒲生 麻由, Gamō Mayu).
  - Reversian Blitz Hells (リバーシア星人ブリッツ・ヘルズ, Ribāshia Seijin Burittsu Heruzu): The lightning-themed oldest, cruelest, and most powerful of the Hells Siblings who possesses energy-based powers, wields a sword and a machine gun-like blaster, is willing to sacrifice his siblings, and earned a reputation as the "Outer Space Grim Reaper" (宇宙の死神, Uchū no Shinigami). After being defeated by the Dekarangers, he attempts to escape in God Pounder, only to be deleted by Riding Dekaranger Robo. Blitz Hells is voiced by Hiroshi Tsuchida (土田 大, Tsuchida Hiroshi).
- Tylerian Durden (タイラー星人ダーデン, Tairā Seijin Dāden): The owner and fight promoter of an illegal fight club, gambling operation, and illegal steroid ring from Planet Tyler. After recognizing the Dekarangers while they were infiltrating his fight club, he retaliates by piloting a demon-themed Kaijuki called Ultimate Evil (アルティメットイビル, Arutimetto Ibiru), only to be deleted by Super Dekaranger Robo. Durden is voiced by Masaharu Satō (佐藤 正治, Satō Masaharu).
- Speckionian Genio (スペキオン星人ジェニオ, Supekion Seijin Jenio): A mirror-themed criminal from Planet Speckion who possesses the ability to travel through and trap people in reflective surfaces and is charged with trapping over 1,000,000 people on 124 planets in his mirror world as his personal "works of art" and murdering Tetsu's parents after they inadvertently surprised him during an attempt to escape S.P.D. on Earth. Two years prior to the series, he was captured by Tetsu and eventually incarcerated in Prison Satellite Alcapo (監獄衛星アルカポ, Kangoku Eisei Arukapo) in solitary confinement and denied access to reflective surfaces. Despite this, Genio would become famous among other Alienizers and inspire criminals to outdo or impress him. In the present, Tetsu questions Genio about a rash of copycat crimes, with the latter revealing the culprit is Bolapeno in exchange for whether Tetsu remembered what his mother said at the time of her death to make him cry. Using Tetsu's tear, Genio escapes and returns to Earth to make Tetsu suffer further. However, Tetsu discovers how to free Genio's victims before deleting him. During the events of the crossover film Tokusou Sentai Dekaranger vs. Abaranger, Saunaginnan resurrects Genio, but the latter is deleted by Deka Blue, Deka Green, Deka Break, and Abare Blue. Genio is voiced by Keiichi Noda (野田 圭一, Noda Keiichi).
- Karakazian Don Sanoa (カラカズ星人ドンサノーア, Karakazu Seijin Sanōa): A shark-themed mass-murderer from Planet Karakaz and the head of the Space Mafia Zundaz Family (宇宙マフィア・ズンダーズファミリー, Uchū Mafia Zundāzu Famirī). Sometime prior to the series, he intended to use his Gyutanium Crystal to power a dangerous weapon, but was arrested. After escaping with help from his underling Zortac, Don Sanoa takes Tetsu and Kruger hostage and equips himself with Muscle Gear, but is deleted by the primary Dekarangers in their S.W.A.T. modes. Don Sanoa is voiced by Sōichirō Tanaka (田中 総一郎, Tanaka Sōichirō).
- Pyrian Kurachek (パイロウ星人コラチェク, Pairō Seijin Koracheku): A fire-themed serial arsonist from Planet Pyr who is charged with 4,103 counts of arson and three counts of planetary incineration and wears a heater-themed protective suit to move freely on other planets. He initially overpowers the Dekarangers until Deka Break discovers his weakness and defeats him. Using a giant version of his original suit he bought from Agent Abrella called a Flame Gear (フレイムギア, Fureimu Gia), Kurachek enlarges himself, but his new suit is deleted by the Deka Wing Cannon, causing his exposed body to be extinguished by the vacuum of space. Kurachek is voiced by Bin Shimada (島田 敏, Shimada Bin).

==== Other Alienizers ====
- Gas Drinkers (ガスドリンカーズ, Gasu Dorinkāzu): Living robots from Planet Algol who appear exclusively in the film Tokusou Sentai Dekaranger The Movie: Full Blast Action. (Note: The Algolians' names are puns on those of alcoholic beverages, with "Algol" itself being a pun on the word "alcohol".) They steal the deadly Golden Snow virus, which transforms organic lifeforms into living robots like themselves, and use it on Planet Leslie in the hopes of selling the vaccine for exorbitant prices, only to be deleted by the Dekarangers.
  - Algolian Winsky (アルゴル星人ウインスキー, Arugoru Seijin Uinsukī): A deranged member of the group who is deleted by Deka Blue. Winsky is voiced by Yoshinori Okamoto (岡本 美登, Okamoto Yoshinori), who also portrays his human form.
  - Algolian Zeen (アルゴル星人ジーン, Arugoru Seijin Jīn): A female member of the group who is deleted by Deka Yellow and Pink. Zeen is voiced by Akiko Amamatsuri (天祭 揚子, Amamatsuri Akiko), who also portrays her human form.
  - Algolian Brandel (アルゴル星人ブランデル, Arugoru Seijin Buranderu): A Gas Drinker who is deleted by Deka Green. Brandel is voiced by Maroshi Tamura (田村 円, Tamura Maroshi), who also portrays his human form.
  - Algolian Volger (アルゴル星人ヴォルガー, Arugoru Seijin Vorugā): The leader of the Gas Drinkers and a practitioner of the space martial art Jaa Kune Do (ジャアクンドー, Jaa Kun Dō). (Note: "Jaa Kune Do" is a portmanteau of the Japanese word jaaku (邪悪, "evil") and Jeet Kune Do.) He intimidates Marie Gold into helping him and the Gas Drinkers before turning her into a carrier for the Golden Snow virus when she betrays him. After the Dekarangers delete his fellow Gas Drinkers and being defeated by Deka Red, Volger flees to Planet Leslie to use an army of tank-like Kaijuki called Killer Tanks (キラータンク, Kirā Tanku) in an attempt to destroy Earth, only to be deleted by Dekaranger Robo Full Blast Custom. Volger is voiced by Kenichi Endō (遠藤 憲一, Endō Ken'ichi), who also portrays his human form.
- Ginjifuan Kazak (ギンジフ星人カザック, Ginjifu Seijin Kazakku): A cobra-themed criminal from Planet Ginjifu and a leading member of the Cosmic Violent Group Birono Family (広域宇宙暴力団ビローノファミリー, Kōiki Uchū Bōryokudan Birōno Famirī) who can disguise himself as any object or person and appears exclusively in the crossover film Tokusou Sentai Dekaranger vs. Abaranger. He attempts to resurrect the Abarangers' enemy Dezumozorlya and use its power to rule the world, only to inadvertently resurrect Abare Killer. After being defeated by the Dekarangers and Abarangers, Kazak retaliates by piloting a Kaijuki called Pallette View (パレットビュー, Paretto Byū), only to be deleted by Super Dekaranger Robo and Killer AbarenOh. Kazak is voiced by Ryūzaburō Ōtomo (大友 龍三郎, Ōtomo Ryūzaburō).
- Chigukadean Builjeek (チグカデ星人ビルヂーク, Chigukade Seijin Birujīku): A giant piranha-themed Mechanoid from Planet Chigukade who appears exclusively in the crossover film Mahō Sentai Magiranger vs. Dekaranger. He attacks a restaurant that the Magirangers and Umeko were eating in until he is captured by the Dekarangers and killed by his partner Babon.
- Algolian Babon (アルゴル星人バボン, Arugoru Seijin Babon): Builjeek's partner and an underling of Agent X's from Planet Algol who is equipped with shoulder-mounted missile pods, an arm-mounted blaster, and a magic circle that allows him to absorb the Dekarangers' energy attacks who appears exclusively in the crossover film Mahō Sentai Magiranger vs. Dekaranger. He assists Agent X in obtaining the Flower of Heaven, but both are eventually deleted by the Magirangers and Dekarangers via the Flower of Heaven's power. Babon is voiced by Takashi Nagasako (長嶝 高士, Nagasako Takashi).

== Guest characters ==
- Fragrantian Erika (フラグラント星人 衛里香, Furanguranto Seijin Erika): The princess of a royal intergalactic family from Planet Fragrant. She is kidnapped by Kevakia, who attempts to ransom her for the rare-but-powerful Wellness Stone, but she is rescued by Ban and Hoji, who delete Kevakia. Erika is portrayed by Risa Yoshiki (吉木 りさ, Yoshiki Risa).
- Doltockian Mano Mark (ドルトック星人マノ・マーク, Dorutokku Seijin Mano Māku): A scientist from Planet Doltock who attempts to deal with Beildon under the alias of Iwaki (岩木), only to be arrested for abetting the Alienizer's crimes. His human form is portrayed by Minosuke (みのすけ).
- Juuzaian Braidy (ジューザ星人ブライディ, Jūza Seijin Buraidi): A mantis-themed alien from Planet Juuza whom Kersus framed for the murder of her sister Karmia and Agent Abrella enlarged to distract the Dekarangers, who discover the truth and arrest Braidy for causing property damage in his enlarged state. Braidy is voiced by Yūsuke Numata (沼田 祐介, Numata Yūsuke).
- Hikaru Hiwatari (日渡 氷狩, Hiwatari Hikaru): A young ESPer with the ability to teleport inanimate objects. Originally a street wanderer, he hated humans because they mistreated him due to his powers, and he wanted to leave the planet as soon as possible. An Alienizer named Dazgonelr uses this to manipulate Hikaru into helping him commit crimes, until Jasmine convinces Hikaru to trust her. Following Dazgonelr's deletion, Hikaru leaves Earth to join S.P.D.'s training academy. As of the direct-to-video anniversary special Tokusou Sentai Dekaranger: 10 Years After, he has joined S.P.D.'s Earth unit and married Jasmine, with whom he has a son named Taiga. Hikaru Hiwatari is portrayed by Yuto Uemura (上村 祐翔, Uemura Yūto).
- Zamuzan Myra (ザムザ星人マイラ, Zamuza Seijin Maira): A young woman from Planet Zamuza who was the subject of a stakeout conducted by the Dekarangers due to her ex-boyfriend, an Alienizer named Sheik, having recently escaped from prison. However, Ban becomes enamored by her and goes undercover as her apartment building's plumber to socialize with her. After Sheik attacks Myra and the Dekarangers delete him, Myra loses respect for Ban for lying to her, but chooses to remain friends with him since he kept his promise to protect her. Myra is portrayed by Nana Nakamoto (中本 奈奈, Nakamoto Nana).
- Ocarnan Amy (オカーナ星人エイミー, Okāna Seijin Eimī): A giant alien baby from planet Ocarna who possesses currently uncontrollable size-changing capabilities limited by a special pacifier and shockwave-inducing cries. After Amy's cradle pod lands on Earth, Umeko is assigned to protect her until the former's parents can come for her. Agent Abrella sends an Igaroid to pilot a Kaijuki called Devil Capture 3 (デビルキャプチャー3, Debiru Kyapuchā Surī) and capture Amy, but Umeko destroys them with Dekaranger Robo before Amy's parents arrive and take their daughter back. Amy is voiced by Sara Nakayama (中山 さら, Nakayama Sara).
- Flora (フローラ, Furōra): An android designed to resemble a teenage girl who an Alienizer named Metiussl originally named Meria (メリア) and created to serve as the brain of his robotic monster, Gigas. After meeting and befriending Sen-chan, however, she learned to develop a "heart" and be more than a machine. After being captured by Metiussl and rescued by Deka Master, Flora joins S.P.D., who accept her as a human. Flora is portrayed by Takaou Ayatsuki (彩月 貴央, Ayatsuki Takaō).
- Zoinaian Baytonin (ゾイナー星人ベートニン, Zoinā Seijin Bētonin): An alien from Planet Zoina who ages more slowly than humans, crashed-landed in Kyoto during Feudal Japan, and became a samurai under Ban's ancestor's tutelage. After ending up in the present, Agent Abrella manipulates the confused Baytonin into believing the Dekarangers are malicious invaders until Ban uses Kruger's D-Sword Vega to defeat Baytonin in battle. Upon realizing the truth, Baytonin leaves peacefully. Baytonin is voiced by Mantarō Iwao (岩尾 万太郎, Iwao Mantarō).
- Bannoshin Akaza (赤座 伴之進, Akaza Ban'noshin): Ban's ancestor from Feudal Japan who nursed the stranded Baytonin back to health and trained him in the ways of bushido and samurai conduct. Bannoshin Akaza is portrayed by Ryuji Sainei, who also portrays Ban Akaza.
- Barisien Attika Alpachi (バリス星人アッティカ・アルパチ, Barisu Seijin Attika Arupachi): A totem pole-themed alien from Planet Barisie. An Alienizer named Goldom kidnaps his son and forces him to take a city block hostage, and threaten to destroy it with a bomb, so Goldom can rob a nearby bank in the confusion. While negotiating with Alpachi for the hostages' release, Umeko realizes the truth and clears his name, while her teammates rescue Alpachi's son and delete Goldom. Attika Alpachi is voiced by Bin Shimada.
- Shinnooian Hakutaku (シンノー星人ハクタク, Shinnō Seijin Hakutaku): A wise woman from Planet Shinoo, with knowledge of all space herbs, who occasionally assumes the form of a human teenage girl and possesses a third eye shaped like a red jewel. After the Dekarangers take her into their protective custody, she provides guidance to Sen-chan, becomes attracted to him, and raises money for their wedding. Hakutaku is voiced by Reiko Suzuki (鈴木 れい子, Suzuki Reiko) while her human form is portrayed by Narumi Konno (近野 成美, Kon'no Narumi).
- Bandarean Jeeva (バンダレ星人ジーバ, Bandare Seijin Jība): A physically imposing Oni-themed alien, and champion boxer in Durden's illegal fight club, from Planet Bandare. After consuming Durden's steroid, Megagesterine, and gaining wing-like horns on his arms and neck, Jeeva fights Hoji, who defeats him. Following this, Jeeva reformed and found work as the assistant director of a television station. Jeeva is voiced by Toshitsugu Takashina (高階 俊嗣, Takashina Toshitsugu).
- Slorpean Faraway (スロープ星人ファラウェイ, Surōpu Seijin Farawei): A small-time criminal from Planet Slorpe who resembles a ganguro girl and possesses proficient hacking skills. After receiving a missile targeting device disguised as a gem from Agent Abrella, she travels to Earth in the Kaijuki Devil Capture 5 (デビルキャプチャー5, Debiru Kyapuchā Faibu), which is destroyed by Deka Bike Robo while she is captured by S.P.D.'s Earth unit. She escapes to rekindle a former relationship, but is confronted by the Dekarangers and learns of Abrella's true intentions. Once the Dekarangers stop the missile and jettison Faraway to safety, she is pardoned. Faraway is portrayed by Aja (あじゃ).
- Tokasaian Princess Io Yonmerluicchi (トカーサ星人イオ・ヨンマールイッチ, Tokāsa Seijin Io Yonmāruitchi): A princess from Planet Tokasa who resembles Umeko. Io Yonmerluicchi is portrayed by Mika Kikuchi, who also portrays Umeko.
- Chanbenarian Gin (チャンベーナ星人ギン, Chanbēna Seijin Gin): A feline alien child from Planet Chanbenar who tries to steal medicine from Hakutaku, for his sick mother, after he was unable to buy it with a pearl he found, but is stopped and befriended by Sen-chan. After surviving an attempt on his life by an Alienizer named Gineka, who used the pearl in his Kaijuki game, Gin's mother receives medicine from Hakutaku at Sen-chan's request. Gin is voiced by Yōko Teppōzuka (鉄炮塚 葉子, Teppōzuka Yōko).
- Teranian Chou San (テラン星人チョウ・サン, Teran Seijin Chō San): A retired veteran detective from Planet Teran who seeks revenge on an Alienizer named Raja Namunan for killing his daughter 13 years prior, but was never able to prove it. In the present, Jasmine shows him the errors of his ways while confirming his theory. Chou San is voiced by Seizō Katō (加藤 精三, Katō Seizō).
- Poppenian Hymal (ポッペン星人ハイマル, Poppen Seijin Haimaru): A crescent moon–headed alien from Planet Poppen who previously worked with Swan Shiratori and was jealous of her after she was chosen for the Police Scientific Criminal Investigation Laboratory, over him. After remotely operating and allowing the Kaijuki Devil Capture 6 (デビルキャプチャー6, Debiru Kyapuchā Shikkusu) to be destroyed while gathering data on the Dekarangers' mecha, he assists Agent Abrella in constructing the composite dinosaur-themed Kaijuki, Frankenzaurus (フランケンザウルス, Furankenzaurusu), using parts from Fan Crusher, Devil Capture 2, Shinobi Shadow, Terrible Terror, God Pounder, and Million Missile, and powered with a Hymal Reactor. Remotely operating Frankenzaurus, Hymal temporarily overpowers the Dekarangers until he is confronted by Deka Swan, is betrayed by Abrella after he sets Frankensaurus' Hymal Reactor to explode, and is forced to shut the reactor down before it does so. After the Dekarangers destroy Frankenzaurus with the Deka Wing Cannon, Hymal attempts to commit suicide, but Swan talks him out of it before Tetsu arrests him. Hymal is voiced by Naoki Tatsuta (龍田 直樹, Tatsuta Naoki).
- Mikean Teresa (マイク星人テレサ, Maiku Seijin Teresa): A singer, guitarist, and Hoji's girlfriend from Planet Mike, who suffers from a terminal disease after working on a dangerous mining planet years prior. Her younger brother Clord worked on a cure, but it involved stealing nutrients from other young women. Upon learning of Clord's crimes, an emotionally torn Hoji deletes him before breaking up with Teresa. Teresa is portrayed by Chie Tanaka (田中 千絵, Tanaka Chie).
- Falufian Yaako (ファルファ星人ヤーコ, Farufa Seijin Yāko): A small pig-themed alien child from Planet Faluf who is capable of manipulating locks. Due to this, she was kidnapped by an Alienizer named Gyanjava, who killed her parents and forced her to aid him in bank robberies across the galaxy. Amidst Gyanjava's attempt to access the Deka Base's systems, Yaako escaped from him and came to S.P.D. to stop him. While under Ban's protection, she transforms into her winged-adult form before using her powers to remove Gyanjava's armor so Ban can delete him. Following this, Yaako continues to help S.P.D. Yaako is voiced by Shoko Nakagawa (中川 翔子, Nakagawa Shōko), who also portrays her adult form.
- Miwa Tomasu (戸増 美和, Tomasu Miwa): Hoji's younger sister who also blurts out English phrases when she gets upset. Miwa Tomasu is portrayed by Kaori Ikeda (池田 香織, Ikeda Kaori).
- Space Life Form Browgoul (宇宙生物ブラウゴール, Uchū Seibutsu Buraugōru): Monstrous dragon-themed alien beasts that feed on the metal of meteors to increase in size. An Alienizer named Nikaradar brings two of the beasts to Earth, where he feeds on the corpse of a professor he killed whose form he assumes in order to direct a meteor to Earth. Though the first Browgoul is killed by Super Dekaranger Robo, its power is transferred to its recently hatched younger sibling, who overpowers Super Dekaranger Robo before willing the meteor back on its course to Earth. With Nikaradar having been deleted, Abrella intends to breed the second Browgoul himself, following Earth's destruction. However, the meteor is destroyed by the Pat Wings while the second Browgoul is destroyed by the Deka Wing Cannon, Deka Ranger Robo, Deka Bike Robo, and Deka Base Robo.

== Spin-off characters ==
- Leslian Marie Gold (レスリー星人マリー・ゴールド, Resurī Seijin Marī Gōrudo): An S.P.D. officer from Planet Leslie with the power to temporarily stop time who serves as Deka Gold (デカゴールド, Deka Gōrudo) and appears exclusively in the film Tokusou Sentai Dekaranger The Movie: Full Blast Action. While working undercover as a nightclub singer to investigate the Gas Drinkers' attack on Leslie, she encounters and falls in love with Ban. Marie Gold is portrayed by Chiharu Niiyama (新山 千春, Niiyama Chiharu) while her singing voice is provided by Sae (小枝).
- Kight Reidlich (カイト・レイドリッヒ, Kaito Reidorihhi): The corrupt chief of the Space Police's Galactic District Police Bureau who appears exclusively in the direct-to-video anniversary special Tokusou Sentai Dekaranger: 10 Years After. Two years prior, Kruger discovered Reidlich had been selling confidential information to the space mafia Qurlian Family (キルリアンファミリー, Kirurian Famirī), but the latter captured him and used his Master License's Mirage Dimension to pose as Kruger and frame him for killing the Qurlians and their Clementian hostage. However, the hostage's daughter Carrie witnessed everything and seeks the Dekarangers' help in stopping Reidlich in the present. After the Dekarangers expose him and rescue Kruger, Reidlich sacrifices his underlings, Assam Asimov and Mugi Grafton, to power his Neo Hyper Muscle Gear and overwhelm the Dekarangers, only to be deleted by them and Deka Master. Kight Reidlich is voiced by Rikiya Koyama (小山 力也, Koyama Rikiya).
- Assam Asimov (アサム・アシモフ, Asamu Ashimofu) and Mugi Grafton (ムギ・グラフトン, Mugi Gurafuton): Two of Reidlich's underlings who work undercover in S.P.D.'s Earth unit as Neo Deka Red (ネオデカレッド, Neo Deka Reddo) and Neo Deka Yellow (ネオデカイエロー, Neo Deka Ierō), respectively, and appear exclusively in the direct-to-video anniversary special Tokusou Sentai Dekaranger: 10 Years After. After failing to kidnap Carrie and being defeated by Deka Blue, Green, Yellow, and Pink, Reidlich forcibly converts Asimov and Grafton into energy to power his Neo Hyper Muscle Gear. Assam Asimov and Mugi Grafton are portrayed by Rakuto Tochihara (栩原 楽人, Tochihara Rakuto) and Mizuho Hata (秦 瑞穂, Hata Mizuho), respectively.
- Clementian Carrie (クレメント星人キャリー, Kuremento Seijin Kyarī): A girl from Planet Clement, whose inhabitants can enter the bodies of others for concealment, who appears exclusively in the direct-to-video anniversary special Tokusou Sentai Dekaranger: 10 Years After. Two years prior, she and her father accidentally stumbled onto Kruger discovering Kight Reidlich's corruption. After Reidlich killed Carrie's father, Kruger told Carrie to find his team. She went into hiding before eventually coming to Earth in the present. Upon finding the Dekarangers, they escort her to Planet Gowashichoru before confronting Reidlich. Carrie is portrayed by Rino Kobayashi (小林 里乃, Kobayashi Rino).
- Rui Edogawa (江戸川 塁, Edogawa Rui): A rookie S.P.D. officer and member of the Fire Squad who can also transform into Premiere Deka Red and appears exclusively in the direct-to-video anniversary special Tokusou Sentai Dekaranger 20th: Fireball Booster. Rui Edogawa is portrayed by Leo Nagatsuma (長妻 怜央, Nagatsuma Reo).
- Ridomihan Mokumisu (リドミハ星人モクミス, Ridomiha Seijin Mokumisu): A botanical garden curator from Planet Ridomiha who appears exclusively in the direct-to-video anniversary special Tokusou Sentai Dekaranger 20th: Fireball Booster. Mokumisu is voiced by Ayano Kawamura (川村 文乃, Kawamura Ayano), who also portrays her human form.
- Yoshiwan Raenjo (ヨシワ星人ラエンジョ, Yoshiwa Seijin Raenjo): Tarewarane's wife from Planet Yoshiwa who appears exclusively in the direct-to-video anniversary special Tokusou Sentai Dekaranger 20th: Fireball Booster. Sometime prior to the special, she betrayed Tarewarane to the Space Police to flee his domestic violence. Raenjo is portrayed by Mei Kurokawa (黒川 芽以, Kurokawa Mei).
- Jiujissonian Rotmen (ジウジッソ星人ロットメン, Jiujisso Seijin Rottomen): Tarewarane's right-hand man from Planet Jiujisso who possesses the ability to assume an alien child form under the alias of Marple (マープル, Māpuru) and appears exclusively in the direct-to-video anniversary special Tokusou Sentai Dekaranger 20th: Fireball Booster. Following Tarewarane's deletion, Rotmen takes over his boss's plans and takes Rakamu hostage to use Raenjo as his pawn. However, his plans are eventually foiled by the Dekarangers and he is deleted by Ban / Premiere Deka Red. Rotmen is voiced by Jun Fukuyama (福山 潤, Fukuyama Jun).
- Yoshiwan Rakamu (ヨシワ星人ラカム, Yoshiwa Seijin Rakamu): Raenjo's daughter who appears exclusively in the direct-to-video anniversary special Tokusou Sentai Dekaranger 20th: Fireball Booster. She is held hostage by Rotmen until Hoji and Jasmine rescue her. Rakamu is portrayed by Mion Ono (小野 美音, Ono Mion).
- Chiman Tarewarane (チーマ星人タレワラーネ, Chīma Seijin Tarewarāne): A drug lord from Planet Chima who appears exclusively in the direct-to-video anniversary special Tokusou Sentai Dekaranger 20th: Fireball Booster. Sometime prior to the special, he was deleted by Rui / Premiere Deka Red. Tarewarane is voiced by Kyōsuke Mano (真野 恭輔, Mano Kyōsuke).
- Ten Haretsuki (晴月 天, Haretsuki Ten): An S.P.D. officer and psychic with the ability to see precognitive dreams who works in S.P.D.'s Earth unit as Deka Pink Sono 2 (デカピンクその2, Deka Pinku Sono Ni) until she is transferred to another branch and appears exclusively in the web-exclusive crossover special Tokusou Sentai Dekaranger with Tombo Ohger. Ten Haretsuki is portrayed by Amisa Miyazaki (宮崎 あみさ, Miyazaki Amisa).
