= List of Tokusou Sentai Dekaranger episodes =

This is a list of episodes for Tokusou Sentai Dekaranger, the twenty-eighth incarnation of the long running Super Sentai series produced by Toei Company. The episode titles only contain katakana, as they are read in English.

== Episode list ==
| No. | English title Original Japanese title | Directed by | Written by | Original release date |
|---|---|---|---|---|
| 1 | "Fireball Newcomer"; Transliteration: "Faiyābōru Nyūkamā" (Japanese: ファイヤーボール・ニューカマー) | Katsuya Watanabe | Naruhisa Arakawa | February 15, 2004 |
Banban Akaza, a newly-trained member of the Special Police Dekaranger (S.P.D.), is given an assignment to Earth where he is placed in the leadership of a five-member crew under Anubian Chief Doggie Kruger, completely turning the team upside down on his first mission.
| 2 | "Robo Impact"; Transliteration: "Robo Inpakuto" (Japanese: ロボ・インパクト) | Katsuya Watanabe | Naruhisa Arakawa | February 22, 2004 |
Three mysterious machines crash-land on Earth, forcing the Dekaranger to investigate what they are and for what purpose they're for before their diabolical impact is unleashed on the populace.
| 3 | "Perfect Blue"; Transliteration: "Pāfekuto Burū" (Japanese: パーフェクト・ブルー) | Masato Tsujino | Naruhisa Arakawa | February 29, 2004 |
Houji's perfect investigation record is put to the test when he gets caught up in an investigation of a kidnapped alien princess.
| 4 | "Cyber Dive"; Transliteration: "Saibā Daibu" (Japanese: サイバー・ダイブ) | Masato Tsujino | Naruhisa Arakawa | March 7, 2004 |
After his perfect record seemingly becomes tarnished by an Alienizer getting away with the princess and the Wellness Stone, Hoji and Ban pursue Rikomoian Kevakia into virtual reality in order to find a way to defeat the virtual criminal.
| 5 | "Buddy Murphy"; Transliteration: "Badi Māfī" (Japanese: バディ・マーフィー) | Noboru Takemoto | Naruhisa Arakawa | March 14, 2004 |
Umeko is placed in charge of training K-9 Murphy, an unruly robot police dog that won't listen to any commands.
| 6 | "Green Mystery"; Transliteration: "Gurīn Misuterī" (Japanese: グリーン・ミステリー) | Noboru Takemoto | Naruhisa Arakawa | March 21, 2004 |
The Dekaranger investigate a murder of an alien woman where the only known suspect is an Alienizer who destroys cars. But while the team see this as an easy case, Sen-chan realizes not all is as it appears.
| 7 | "Silent Telepathy"; Transliteration: "Sairento Terepashī" (Japanese: サイレント・テレパシー) | Katsuya Watanabe | Naruhisa Arakawa | March 28, 2004 |
The attack of a new Kaijuuki controlled by a boy with telepathic abilities forces Jasmine to confront her own uniqueness as she tries to reach out to help him understand himself and his powers.
| 8 | "Rainbow Vision"; Transliteration: "Reinbō Bijon" (Japanese: レインボー・ビジョン) | Katsuya Watanabe | Naruhisa Arakawa | April 4, 2004 |
As the Dekarangers continue to try and figure out how to defeat the Kaijuuki and the new Igaroid model Mechanoid, Jasmine fights to save Hikaru from the influence of Cthulian Dagoneila so he can use his powers for good.
| 9 | "Stakeout Trouble"; Transliteration: "Suteikuauto Toraburu" (Japanese: ステイクアウト・トラブル) | Taro Sakamoto | Junki Takegami | April 11, 2004 |
Ban becomes connected to an alien woman he is forced to stake out due to her former Alienizer boyfriend escaping from prison.
| 10 | "Trust Me"; Transliteration: "Torasuto Mī" (Japanese: トラスト・ミー) | Taro Sakamoto | Junki Takegami | April 18, 2004 |
With Zamuzan Sheik in pursuit of her, Ban and Myra must work together and with the other Dekaranger to find a way to bring him to justice, even if it means giving him what he wants.
| 11 | "Pride Sniper"; Transliteration: "Puraido Sunaipā" (Japanese: プライド・スナイパー) | Shojiro Nakazawa | Naruhisa Arakawa | April 25, 2004 |
A friend of Hoji returns to Earth from special S.P.D. assignment, as suspicions of an Alienizer mole has emerged within the force.
| 12 | "Babysitter Syndrome"; Transliteration: "Bebīshittā Shindorōmu" (Japanese: ベビーシッター・シンドローム) | Shojiro Nakazawa | Naruhisa Arakawa | May 2, 2004 |
A giant alien baby crash-lands on Earth, which Umeko is stuck taking care of and keeping out of trouble and harms way.
| 13 | "High Noon Dogfight"; Transliteration: "Hai Nūn Doggufaito" (Japanese: ハイヌーン・ドッグファイト) | Noboru Takemoto | Naruhisa Arakawa | May 9, 2004 |
Kajimerian Ben G, an Alienizer personally brought down by Doggie Kruger, comes to Earth to take revenge on his captor.
| 14 | "Please, Boss"; Transliteration: "Purīzu Bosu" (Japanese: プリーズ・ボス) | Noboru Takemoto | Naruhisa Arakawa | May 16, 2004 |
Having discovered Kruger's ability to become DekaMaster, the Dekaranger team plot to see their boss in action once again; yet Kruger has a harsh lesson to teach them through their next mission.
| 15 | "Android Girl"; Transliteration: "Andoroido Gāru" (Japanese: アンドロイド・ガール) | Katsuya Watanabe | Junki Takegami | May 23, 2004 |
Alienizer Titanian Metius comes to Earth to gain control of the ultimate mechanical monster, while Sen-chan meets a girl who is more peculiar than she initially lets on.
| 16 | "Giant Destroyer"; Transliteration: "Jaianto Desutoroiyā" (Japanese: ジャイアント・デストロイヤー) | Katsuya Watanabe | Junki Takegami | May 30, 2004 |
As Metius prepares to awaken the full capabilities of Gigas, Sen and the Dekaranger fight to protect Flora and prevent her from being used for the purpose she was created for.
| 17 | "Twin Cam Angel"; Transliteration: "Tsuin Kamu Enjeru" (Japanese: ツインカム・エンジェル) | Katsuya Watanabe | Naruhisa Arakawa | June 6, 2004 |
Sick of being underestimated and being shown off by Jasmine, Umeko decides to model herself after DekaYellow in hopes of improving her respect and reputation.
| 18 | "Samurai, Go West"; Transliteration: "Samurai Gō Uesuto" (Japanese: サムライ・ゴーウエスト) | Taro Sakamoto | Naruhisa Arakawa | June 13, 2004 |
The Dekaranger head to Kyoto, where they encounter an alien who learned the ways of Bushido from Ban's Shinsengumi ancestor and whom they must convince to return home without causing trouble.
| 19 | "Fake Blue"; Transliteration: "Feiku Burū" (Japanese: フェイク・ブルー) | Taro Sakamoto | Naruhisa Arakawa | June 27, 2004 |
After being captured by the Dekaranger, Alienizer criminal Wojonian Jinche switches bodies with Hoji in a scheme to take over Dekabase.
| 20 | "Running Hero"; Transliteration: "Ranningu Hīrō" (Japanese: ランニング・ヒーロー) | Noboru Takemoto | Michiko Yokote | July 4, 2004 |
A mad bomber Alienizer forces the Dekaranger to play in a game with the Earth at stake, where Kruger peculiarly makes Ban the participant who must run to defuse the targets.
| 21 | "Mad Brothers"; Transliteration: "Maddo Burazāzu" (Japanese: マッド・ブラザーズ) | Noboru Takemoto | Junki Takegami | July 11, 2004 |
The Hell Siblings, a team of particularly infamous Alienizer criminal siblings, arrive on Earth to cause chaos and havoc while forcing Jasmine to face their true terror to the point of being the only potential hope of savior.
| 22 | "Full Throttle Elite"; Transliteration: "Furu Surottoru Erīto" (Japanese: フルスロットル・エリート) | Shojiro Nakazawa | Naruhisa Arakawa | July 18, 2004 |
With the Earth Dekaranger held at the mercy of the Hell Siblings, they request to main base the assistance of an elite Tokkyou agent to combat the world destroyers. But can they last long enough before his arrival!? Note: This episode marks the Super Sentai Series debut of Suit Actor Hisanori Ōiwa, known by his stage name, Eitoku, despite having recurring suit acting roles in early 2000's Super Sentai Series.
| 23 | "Brave Emotion"; Transliteration: "Bureibu Emōshon" (Japanese: ブレイブ・エモーション) | Shojiro Nakazawa | Naruhisa Arakawa | July 25, 2004 |
The Dekaranger are given a direct order from HQ to allow Tetsu complete control of the Hell Siblings case and to not get involved any further. But can DekaBreak defeat the Alienizer threat without what the main team possesses?
| 24 | "Cutie Negotiator"; Transliteration: "Kyūtī Negoshietā" (Japanese: キューティー・ネゴシエイター) | Masato Tsujino | Junki Takegami | August 1, 2004 |
When an Alienizer captures Tetsu and threatens to blow up a section of the city, Umeko decides to attempt negotiation with the being, discovering a bizarre secret amidst the truth.
| 25 | "Witness Grandma"; Transliteration: "Wittonesu Guranma" (Japanese: ウィットネス・グランマ) | Masato Tsujino | Junki Takegami | August 8, 2004 |
Sen finds himself protecting an elderly alien from a spirit-like Alienizer that only she can stop, made more dangerous when one of the Dekarangers is possessed by it.
| 26 | "Cool Passion"; Transliteration: "Kūru Passhon" (Japanese: クール・パッション) | Taro Sakamoto | Michiko Yokote | August 15, 2004 |
Investigating an illegal fighting ring distributing muscle-enhancing drugs, Hoji takes Tetsu's place in fighting the club's champion, revealing more about his drive for perfection.
| 27 | "Funky Prisoner"; Transliteration: "Fankī Purizunā" (Japanese: ファンキー・プリズナー) | Taro Sakamoto | Naruhisa Arakawa | August 22, 2004 |
In order to catch a tornado-manipulating Alienizer, Jasmine recruits his arrested partner, a bizarre thief chicken Alienizer, to help find him.
| 28 | "Alienizer Returns"; Transliteration: "Arienaizā Ritānzu" (Japanese: アリエナイザー・リターンズ) | Noboru Takemoto | Junki Takegami | August 29, 2004 |
The return of several deleted Alienizers forces Tetsu to track down Speckionian Genio, a prisoner Alienizer who murdered his parents, in order to find out who is behind this.
| 29 | "Mirror Revenger"; Transliteration: "Mirā Ribenjā" (Japanese: ミラー・リベンジャー) | Noboru Takemoto | Junki Takegami | September 5, 2004 |
With Speckionian Genio free and the Dekaranger of Earth being abducted for his "artistic revenge", Tetsu must figure out the means to finally take him down or else suffer a fate worse than death.
| 30 | "Gal Hazard"; Transliteration: "Gyaru Hazādo" (Japanese: ギャル・ハザード) | Shojiro Nakazawa | Naruhisa Arakawa | September 12, 2004 |
An alien Gal thief causes havoc for the Dekaranger as she pursues a mission to transport a gem to Earth for a particular client.
| 31 | "Princess Training"; Transliteration: "Purinsesu Torēningu" (Japanese: プリンセス・トレーニング) | Shojiro Nakazawa | Naruhisa Arakawa | September 19, 2004 |
Believing that an assassin is after her life, Umeko switches places with an alien princess in partaking in a special ceremony on Earth.
| 32 | "Discipline March"; Transliteration: "Dishipurin Māchi" (Japanese: ディシプリン・マーチ) | Masato Tsujino | Michiko Yokote | September 26, 2004 |
Abrella sells a special prototype gear to a mobster Alienizer duo, which easily crushes the Dekaranger forcing them to return to training on a far-off planet to obtain SWAT Mode to handle tougher assignments.
| 33 | "SWAT Mode On"; Transliteration: "Suwatto Mōdo On" (Japanese: スワットモード・オン) | Masato Tsujino | Michiko Yokote | October 3, 2004 |
With the Zundaz Family rampaging through the city and capturing Tetsu and Kruger to obtain their target from Dekabase, all hope rides on the Dekaranger, who must figure out the means to survive and solve Tortorian Buntar SWAT Mode training!
| 34 | "Celeb Game"; Transliteration: "Serebu Gēmu" (Japanese: セレブ・ゲーム) | Nobuhiro Suzumura | Junki Takegami | October 10, 2004 |
An investigation by Sen regarding three rampaging Kaijuuki leads to three rich and powerful aliens vacationing on Earth and a poor cat alien whose discovery may get him in major trouble.
| 35 | "Unsolved Case"; Transliteration: "Ansorubudo Kēsu" (Japanese: アンソルブド・ケース) | Nobuhiro Suzumura | Junki Takegami | October 17, 2004 |
The murder of a suspect in a thirteen-year unsolved cold case brings an old detective to Earth to solve the mystery, yet Jasmine discovers he may have lost something due to his investigation.
| 36 | "Mother Universe"; Transliteration: "Mazā Yunibāsu" (Japanese: マザー・ユニバース) | Katsuya Watanabe | Michiko Yokote | October 24, 2004 |
The Dekarangers give Swan a day off to accept an award for her science work, but face difficulty without her around against a former S.P.D. scientist and his composite Kaijuuki.
| 37 | "Hard Boiled License"; Transliteration: "Hādo Boirudo Raisensu" (Japanese: ハードボイルド・ライセンス) | Katsuya Watanabe | Naruhisa Arakawa | October 31, 2004 |
To complete his final exam for his Tokkyou license, Hoji must capture a deadly Alienizer who may be connected to his girlfriend.
| 38 | "Cycling Bomb"; Transliteration: "Saikuringu Bomu" (Japanese: サイクリング・ボム) | Noboru Takemoto | Junki Takegami | November 7, 2004 |
Ban becomes trapped with an immature piglet-like alien on a bicycle which its Alienizer partner has set to blow if it goes below 25 km/h.
| 39 | "Requiem World"; Transliteration: "Rekuiemu Wārudo" (Japanese: レクイエム・ワールド) | Noboru Takemoto | Naruhisa Arakawa | November 14, 2004 |
Umeko becomes trapped within a bizarre nightmare created by a dream-manipulating Alienizer, forcing Jasmine to solve the case before her soul is trapped away forever.
| 40 | "Gold Badge Education"; Transliteration: "Gōrudo Bajji Edyukēshon" (Japanese: ゴールドバッヂ・エデュケーション) | Shojiro Nakazawa | Michiko Yokote | November 21, 2004 |
Lisa Teagle, a Tokkyou commander, comes to Earth to stop a special fire-manipulating Alienizer threat, as well as bring her student Tetsu back into the fold for losing his emotionless Tokkyou ways.
| 41 | "Trick Room"; Transliteration: "Torikku Rūmu" (Japanese: トリック・ルーム) | Shojiro Nakazawa | Junki Takegami | November 28, 2004 |
An assassin Alienizer transports Sen into a shrinking room, where he must figure out the means of his technique and a way out before being crushed in thirty minutes time.
| 42 | "Skull Talking"; Transliteration: "Sukaru Tōkingu" (Japanese: スカル・トーキング) | Taro Sakamoto | Naruhisa Arakawa | December 5, 2004 |
The Dekaranger must decipher the mystery of a space monster planted on Earth to destroy it through remains left with its arrival; while Ban tries to help Hoji deal with balancing his work and family.
| 43 | "Meteor Catastrophe"; Transliteration: "Meteo Katasutorofu" (Japanese: メテオ・カタストロフ) | Taro Sakamoto | Naruhisa Arakawa | December 12, 2004 |
When a second Browgouls emerges on Earth resummoning the meteor for its destruction, Hoji must undertake a suicide mission to stop the source of the monster's power, even with Ban's obsession to make sure he returns home alive.
| 44 | "Mortal Campaign"; Transliteration: "Mōtaru Kyanpēn" (Japanese: モータル・キャンペーン) | Nobuhiro Suzumura | Junki Takegami | December 19, 2004 |
Tired of the Dekaranger interrupting his business ventures, Abrella brings in a swordsman rival of Doggie Kruger to take the badges of the Earth Dekaranger to reduce their threat to criminals.
| 45 | "Accidental Present"; Transliteration: "Akushidentaru Purezento" (Japanese: アクシデンタル・プレゼント) | Nobuhiro Suzumura | Michiko Yokote | December 26, 2004 |
When a strange doll arrives at Dekabase as a New Year's present to one of them, the Dekaranger try to figure out who sent it and whom it was for, ultimately leading to a bizarre revelation...
| 46 | "Propose Panic"; Transliteration: "Puropōzu Panikku" (Japanese: プロポーズ・パニック) | Shojiro Nakazawa | Naruhisa Arakawa | January 9, 2005 |
Umeko gets a proposal from a nearly-perfect dream lover, which draws the attention of Sen as he sees a possible connection to a suspicious smuggler.
| 47 | "Wild Heart, Cool Brain"; Transliteration: "Wairudo Hāto Kūru Burein" (Japanese: ワイルドハート・クールブレイン) | Shojiro Nakazawa | Junki Takegami | January 16, 2005 |
Hoji and Jasmine re-team as a duo to take down an ESPer-murdering Alienizer who had hurt both in the past and connected to the fall of Earth's first DekaRed.
| 48 | "Fireball Succession"; Transliteration: "Faiyābōru Sakuseshon" (Japanese: ファイヤーボール・サクセション) | Noboru Takemoto | Michiko Yokote | January 23, 2005 |
After being recruited into joining the elite S.P.D. Fire Squad, Ban begins to wonder whether the Dekaranger of Earth can do without him as a body-manipulating Alienizer begins Abrella's final plan for their downfall.
| 49 | "Devil's Deka Base"; Transliteration: "Debiruzu Deka Bēsu" (Japanese: デビルズ・デカベース) | Noboru Takemoto | Naruhisa Arakawa | January 30, 2005 |
With an army of mecha-humans and mercenaries at his command, Abrella invades DekaBase, forcing the Dekaranger to scramble back to figure out how to save it and prevent the destruction of their city.
| 50 (Final) | "Forever Dekaranger"; Transliteration: "Fōebā Dekarenjā" (Japanese: フォーエバー・デカレンジャー) | Noboru Takemoto | Naruhisa Arakawa | February 6, 2005 |
DekaBase has fallen and the technology of the Earth Dekaranger is now in the hands of Abrella. Can Ban and his five partner Dekaranger make a final stand to figure out a way to take back their base and stop the evil black-market Alienizer once and for all?
