= Tokusou Sentai Dekaranger The Movie: Full Blast Action =

- Cover art of DVD.
- Kanji: 特捜戦隊デカレンジャー THE MOVIE フルブラスト・アクション
- Revised Hepburn: Tokusō Sentai Dekarenjā Za Mūbī Furu Burasuto Akushon
- Directed by: Katsuya Watanabe
- Written by: Naruhisa Arakawa
- Based on: Tokusou Sentai Dekaranger by Naruhisa Arakawa
- Starring: Ryuji Sainei; Tsuyoshi Hayashi; Yousuke Itou; Ayumi Kinoshita; Mika Kikuchi; Tomokazu Yoshida; Chiharu Niiyama; Kenichi Endō; Mako Ishino
- Narrated by: Toshio Furukawa
- Cinematography: Fumio Matsumura
- Edited by: Chieko Suzaki
- Music by: Kōichirō Kameyama
- Distributed by: Toei Company; Toei Agency; TV Asahi; Asatsu DK; Bandai
- Release date: September 11, 2004
- Running time: 39 minutes
- Country: Japan
- Language: Japanese

Tokusou Sentai Dekaranger The Movie: Full Blast Action (特捜戦隊デカレンジャー THE MOVIE フルブラスト・アクション, Tokusō Sentai Dekarenjā Za Mūbī Furu Burasuto Akushon) is the film adaptation of the 2004 Super Sentai Series Tokusou Sentai Dekaranger. The film was released in Japanese theaters on September 11, 2004, as a double-bill with the Kamen Rider Blade film Kamen Rider Blade: Missing Ace. It was released on DVD on February 21, 2005. Full Blast Action borrows several plot elements from the 2000 film Mission: Impossible 2, while its action scenes pay homage to the works of director John Woo.

== Plot ==
The Dekarangers encounter the Algolian Gas Drinkers following a high-speed pursuit, and while the Alienizer gang manages to retreat, Deka Break recovers a briefcase that they were carrying. Inside the briefcase is a top-secret virus called "Golden Snow", which was being experimented on the planet Leslie. As communications to Leslie have failed, Tetsu is assigned to travel to the planet to investigate while the other Dekarangers scout around for leads on the Gas Drinkers' whereabouts. Ban and Jasmine enter a nightclub, where Ban meets Marie Gold, a beautiful singer with the ability to temporarily stop time. She also reveals herself as an undercover S.P.D. officer from Leslie. It is revealed that the Gas Drinkers released the Golden Snow virus on Leslie, turning the planet's population into machine slaves. Marie is the only survivor, as she was on patrol duty outside the planet. The gang's intention was to infect planets with the virus before selling the vaccine to them for a high price with the help of Agent Abrella; however, their plans were complicated by the Dekarangers' intervention upon their arrival on Earth.

Later, Marie uses her time-stopping power to steal the virus from Swan's laboratory, as she had made a deal with the Gas Drinkers to exchange it for the vaccine to save her planet. After Jasmine uses her ESPer abilities to track Marie's whereabouts, the Dekarangers head to an abandoned warehouse outside town to stop the exchange from happening. While Ban confronts Marie over her sense of justice, the Gas Drinkers' leader Volger injects her with the full dose of the virus, telling the Dekarangers that she will fall violently ill and spread it all over Earth in an hour unless they pay 10 billion for the vaccine. Marie pleads to Ban to kill her in order to prevent the virus from spreading, but he promises to recover the vaccine and save her. After Murphy takes Marie back to Deka Base, the Dekarangers have the Gas Drinkers approved for deletion. Deka Blue destroys Whinsky, while Deka Yellow and Deka Pink eliminate Zeen and Deka Green takes down Brandell. Deka Red engages Volger in a gun fight, but finds himself cornered when the Alienizer cheats by using an energy attack on him. Deka Master suddenly appears from an S.P.D. helicopter and intervenes, giving Deka Red an opportunity to chase after Volger while he cuts down three Igaroids with the Vega Slash. Deka Red defeats Volger and recovers the vaccine before throwing it to Deka Master, who heads back to Deka Base. However, Volger recovers and teleports to Leslie to prepare his machine slaves for an invasion of Earth. Dekaranger Robo arrives on Leslie to stop Volger, but is pummeled by his Kaijuki Killer Tank. A Blast Buggy driven by Deka Break arrives to intervene and combine with Dekaranger Robo to form Dekaranger Robo Full Blast Custom to cut down Volger's machine slave army and destroy Killer Tank.

The next day, a fully recovered Marie bids farewell to the Dekarangers, as she is on her way to return to Leslie with the vaccine. Before she leaves, she stops time to give Ban a flower and a kiss, hoping to see him again soon.

== Cast ==
- Banban Akaza (赤座 伴番, Akaza Banban): Ryuji Sainei (載寧 龍二, Sainei Ryūji)
- Houji Tomasu (戸増 宝児, Tomasu Hōji): Tsuyoshi Hayashi (林 剛史, Hayashi Tsuyoshi)
- Senichi Enari (江成 仙一, Enari Sen'ichi): Yousuke Itou (伊藤 陽佑, Itō Yōsuke)
- Marika Reimon (礼紋 茉莉花, Reimon Marika): Ayumi Kinoshita (木下 あゆ美, Kinoshita Ayumi)
- Koume Kodou (胡堂 小梅, Kodō Koume): Mika Kikuchi (菊地 美香, Kikuchi Mika)
- Tekkan Aira (姶良 鉄幹, Aira Tekkan): Tomokazu Yoshida (吉田 友一, Yoshida Tomokazu)
- Swan Shiratori (白鳥 スワン, Shiratori Suwan): Mako Ishino (石野 真子, Ishino Mako)
- Leslian Girl (レスリー星の少女, Resurī-sei no Shōjo): Mirai Shida (志田 未来, Shida Mirai)
- Marie Gold (マリー・ゴールド, Marī Gōrudo): Chiharu Niiyama (新山 千春, Niiyama Chiharu)
- Volger (ヴォルガー, Vorugā): Kenichi Endō (遠藤 憲一, Endō Ken'ichi)
- Brandel (ブランデル, Buranderu): Maroshi Tamura (田村 円, Tamura Maroshi)
- Zeen (ジーン, Jīn): Akiko Amamatsuri (天祭 揚子, Amamatsuri Akiko)
- Winsky (ウインスキー, Uinsukī): Yoshinori Okamoto (岡本 美登, Okamoto Yoshinori)
- Furabiijo (フラビージョ, Furabījo): Azusa Yamamoto (山本 梓, Yamamoto Azusa; Cameo)
- Wendinu (ウェンディーヌ, Wendīnu): Mio Fukuzumi (福澄 美緒, Fukuzumi Mio; Cameo)
- Doggie Kruger (ドギー・クルーガー, Dogī Kurūgā; Voice): Tetsu Inada (稲田 徹, Inada Tetsu)
- Agent Abrella (エージェント・アブレラ, Ējento Aburera; Voice): Ryūsei Nakao (中尾 隆聖, Nakao Ryūsei)
- Batsuroids (バーツロイド, Bātsuroido; Voice): Katsumi Shiono (塩野 勝美, Shiono Katsumi)
- Igaroids (イーガロイド, Īgaroido; Voice): Kazuya Nakai (中井 和哉, Nakai Kazuya)
- Michael Micsong (マイクル・マイクソン, Maikuru Maikuson; Voice): Isao Sasaki (ささき いさお, Sasaki Isao)
- Narrator: Toshio Furukawa (古川 登志夫, Furukawa Toshio)

== Songs ==
Insert songs

- "Midnight Dekaranger" (ミッドナイト デカレンジャー, Middonaito Dekarenjā)
  - Lyrics: Shoko Fujibayashi
  - Composition: Hideaki Takatori
  - Arrangement: Kōichirō Kameyama (亀山 耕一郎, Kameyama Kōichirō)
  - Artist: Isao Sasaki
- "Tokusou Sentai Dekaranger" (特捜戦隊デカレンジャー, Tokusō Sentai Dekarenjā)
  - Lyrics: Yumi Yoshimoto (吉元 由美, Yoshimoto Yumi)
  - Composition: Ayumi Miyazaki
  - Arrangement: Seiichi Kyōda (京田 誠一, Kyōda Seiichi)
  - Artist: Psychic Lover

Ending theme

- "THE MOVIE VERSION DEKARANGER"
  - Lyrics: Shoko Fujibayashi
  - Composition: Yūmao
  - Arrangement: Yukihiko Nishihata (西端 幸彦, Nishihata Yukihiko)
  - Artist: Dekaren Boys & Girls (デカレンボーイズ&ガールズ, Dekaren Bōizu ando Gāruzu) (Ryuji Sainei, Tsuyoshi Hayashi, Yousuke Itou, Ayumi Kinoshita, Mika Kikuchi, Tomokazu Yoshida)

== Manga adaptation ==
A manga adaptation of the film was published by Kadokawa Shoten in their Tokusatsu Ace magazine. The graphic novel was published on June 1, 2005.
