= Mika Kikuchi =

Japanese voice actress (born 1983)

- 菊地 美香
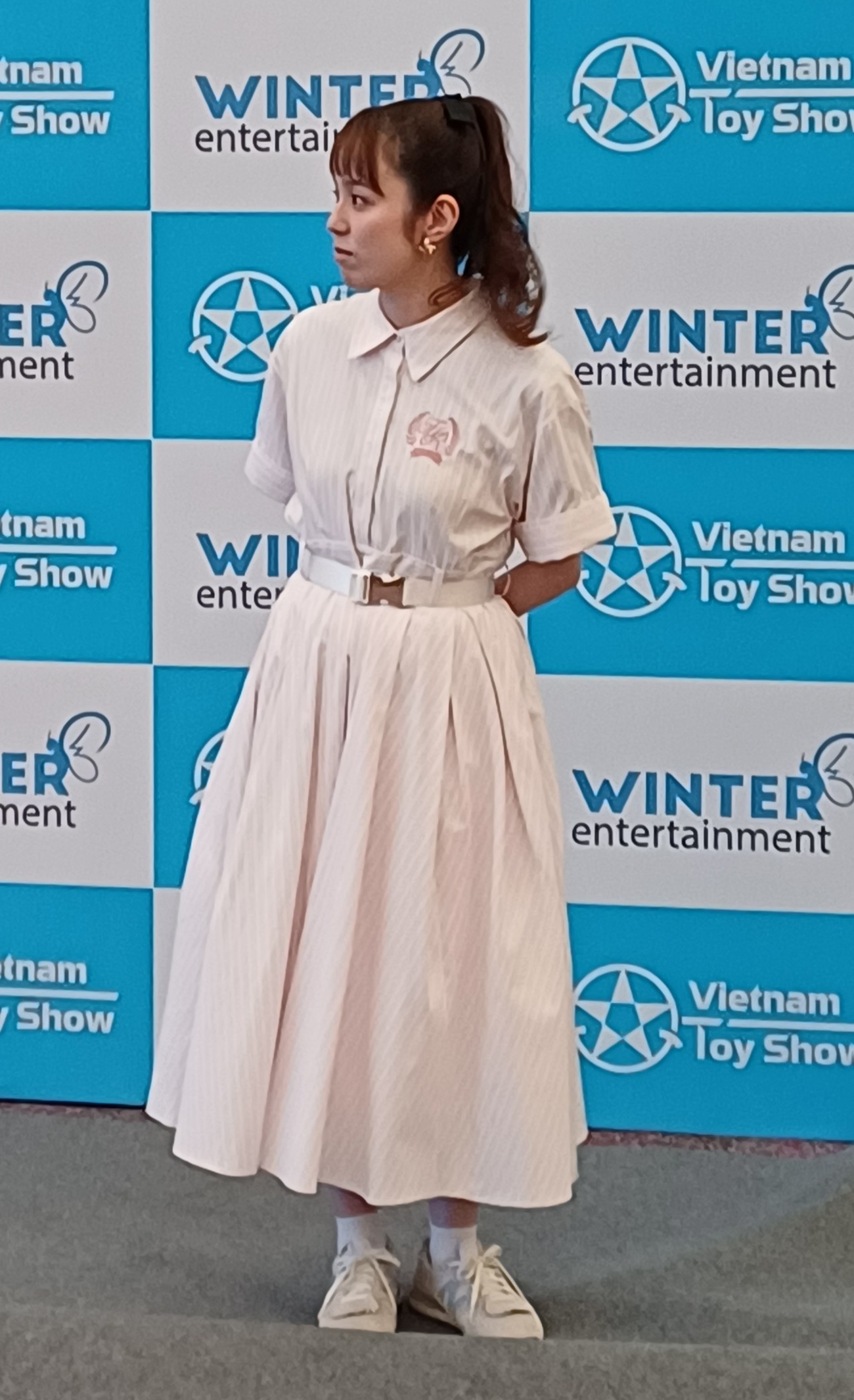
- Mika Kikuchi at a fan meeting event in Vietnam
- Born: December 16, 1983 (age 42); Misato, Saitama, Japan
- Occupations: Actress; voice actress; singer
- Years active: 2000–present
- Agent: BLACK SHIP
- Height: 150 cm (4 ft 11 in)
- Spouses: Yūji Kishi (m. 2009; div. 2011); Tomokazu Yoshida (m. 2018)

Mika Kikuchi (菊地 美香, Kikuchi Mika; born December 16, 1983) is a Japanese actress and singer.

== Career ==
In 2000, Kikuchi made her stage debut as Janet in the Japanese version of the musical Annie. She also had small roles in Suicide Circle and Battle Royale II: Requiem before landing the role of Koume Kodou (Umeko)/DekaPink in 2004's iteration of the Super Sentai franchise, Tokusou Sentai Dekaranger.

Kikuchi diversified into voice acting in 2005, voicing the character Mokona in the anime Tsubasa Chronicle and xxxHoLiC, based on Clamp's popular manga. She has also presented a children's variety show Nyanchuu World on the NHK channel, as well as net radio work for Tsubasa Chronicle (with fellow voice actress Yui Makino) and Mai Otome (with Ami Koshimizu), the popular anime in which she plaid the lead character Arika Yumemiya.

== Personal life ==
On December 16, 2009, her birthday, she married actor Yūji Kishi, who is 13 years her senior. They met during the 2007 Japanese stage tour of Les Misérables, and coincidentally both have had their acting debuts in a Super Sentai Series. They filed for divorce on December 29, 2011. On August 31, 2018, it was announced on her Twitter account that she got married again, this time to her fellow Dekaranger cast member Tomokazu Yoshida (who played Tetsu/DekaBreak).

== Filmography ==
=== Anime ===
==== TV ====
- Tsubasa: Reservoir Chronicle (2005–06) – Mokona Modoki
- Mai Otome (2005–06) – Arika Yumemiya
- Pokémon: Battle Frontier (2005) – Shiromi
- Capeta (2006) – Monami Suzuki (Middle School)
- xxxHolic (2006–08) – Mokona Modoki
- The Girl Who Leapt Through Space (2009) – Bougainvillea
- Katekyo Hitman REBORN (2010) – Bluebell
- Girls und Panzer (2012–13) – Noriko Isobe
- Robot Girls Z (2014) – Minerva X
- Last Period (2018) – Liza
- The Red Ranger Becomes an Adventurer in Another World (2025) – Emily Tobihoshi/Kizuna Yellow
- Magic Knight Rayearth (2026) – Mokona

==== Films ====
- Tsubasa Reservoir Chronicle the Movie: The Princess in the Birdcage Kingdom (2005) – Mokona Modoki
- XxxHolic: A Midsummer Night's Dream (2005) – Mokona Modoki
- Girls und Panzer der Film (2015) – Noriko Isobe
- Girls und Panzer das Finale: Part 1 (2017) – Noriko Isobe
- Girls und Panzer das Finale: Part 2 (2019) – Noriko Isobe
- Girls und Panzer das Finale: Part 3 (2021) – Noriko Isobe
- Girls und Panzer das Finale: Part 4 (2023) – Noriko Isobe

==== Original video animation (OVA) ====
- Tsubasa Tokyo Revelations (2007–08) – Mokona Modoki
- Tsubasa Spring Thunder Chronicles (2009) – Mokona Modoki
- xxxHolic Shunmuki (2009) – Mokona Modoki
- xxxHolic Rō (2010–11) – Mokona Modoki
- Yankee-kun na Yamada-kun to Megane-chan to Majo (2015) – Rinka Himeji

=== Live-action ===
- Tokusou Sentai Dekaranger (2004–2005) – Koume Kodou (Umeko)/Dekapink
- One Missed Call (2005) – Kanna
- Kamen Rider Kabuto (2006) – Yuki Tamai (Guest in episode 3)
- Nyanchuu World – Mika-Chan (Host; Children's Series)

=== Films ===
- Suicide Circle (2001) – Sakura Kuroda
- Φ, Phi (xxxx) – Ayaka
- Battle Royale II: Requiem (2003) – Ayane Yagi
- Tokusou Sentai Dekaranger The Movie: Full Blast Action (2004) – Koume Kodou (Umeko)/Dekapink
- Tokusou Sentai Dekaranger vs. Abaranger (2005) – Koume Kodou (Umeko)/Dekapink
- Mahou Sentai Magiranger vs. Dekaranger (2006) – Koume Kodou (Umeko)/Dekapink
- Chō Ninja Tai Inazuma! (2006) – Jun Terada
- Cho Ninja Tai Inazuma!! SPARK (2007) – Jun Terada
- Engine Sentai Go-onger: Boom Boom! Bang Bang! GekijōBang!! (2008) – Honoshu Warrior Tsukinowa
- Gokaiger Goseiger Super Sentai 199 Hero Great Battle (2011) – Koume Kodou (Umeko)/Dekapink
- Tokusou Sentai Dekaranger: 10 Years After (2015) – Koume Kodou (Umeko)/Dekapink
- Kamen Rider Heisei Generations: Dr. Pac-Man vs. Ex-Aid & Ghost with Legend Rider (2016) - News Reporter
- Space Squad (2017) – Koume Kodou (Umeko)/Dekapink
- Gozen (2019)
- Tokusou Sentai Dekaranger 20th: Fireball Booster (2024) – Koume Kodou (Umeko)/Dekapink
- Tokusou Sentai Dekaranger with Tombo Ohger (2024) – Koume Kodou (Umeko)/Dekapink

=== Stage ===
- Annie – Janet
- Morning Musume Musical:Love Century -Yume wa Minakerya Hajimaranai- – Chika
- Ginga Tetsudou no Yoru – Kaoru
- NOISE – Mami
- My Life – Yumi
- Les Misérables (2007-2009 Japanese Stage Tour) – Cosette
- Hakuōki Musical: Hijikata Toshizo version – Yukimura Chizuru

=== Dubbing ===
- Power Rangers S.P.D. – Sydney "Syd" Drew/SPD Pink Ranger

== Discography ==
=== Related CDs ===
- My Star by Mika Kikuchi. This CD Single (AVCA-22878, released by avex mode) is her debut single; this from Mika's own venture into recording her own music.
- Hanjuku Heroine (半熟ヒロイン☆) by Mika Kikuchi and Ami Koshimizu (Mai Otome net radio opening theme)
- Otome wa DO MY BEST desho? (乙女はDO MY BESTでしょ？) by Mika Kikuchi and Ami Koshimizu (Mai Otome ending theme)
- Tokusou Sentai Dekaranger OST (features several tracks with Mika's vocals)
- Mahou Sentai Magiranger OST (Song: "Tenkuukai no Yasuragi ~ Peace in the Heavens")
- Chou Ninja Tai Inazuma OST: Thank You ~2007 .Jun ver~
