= Tomokazu Yoshida =

Japanese actor (born 1982)

- 吉田 友一
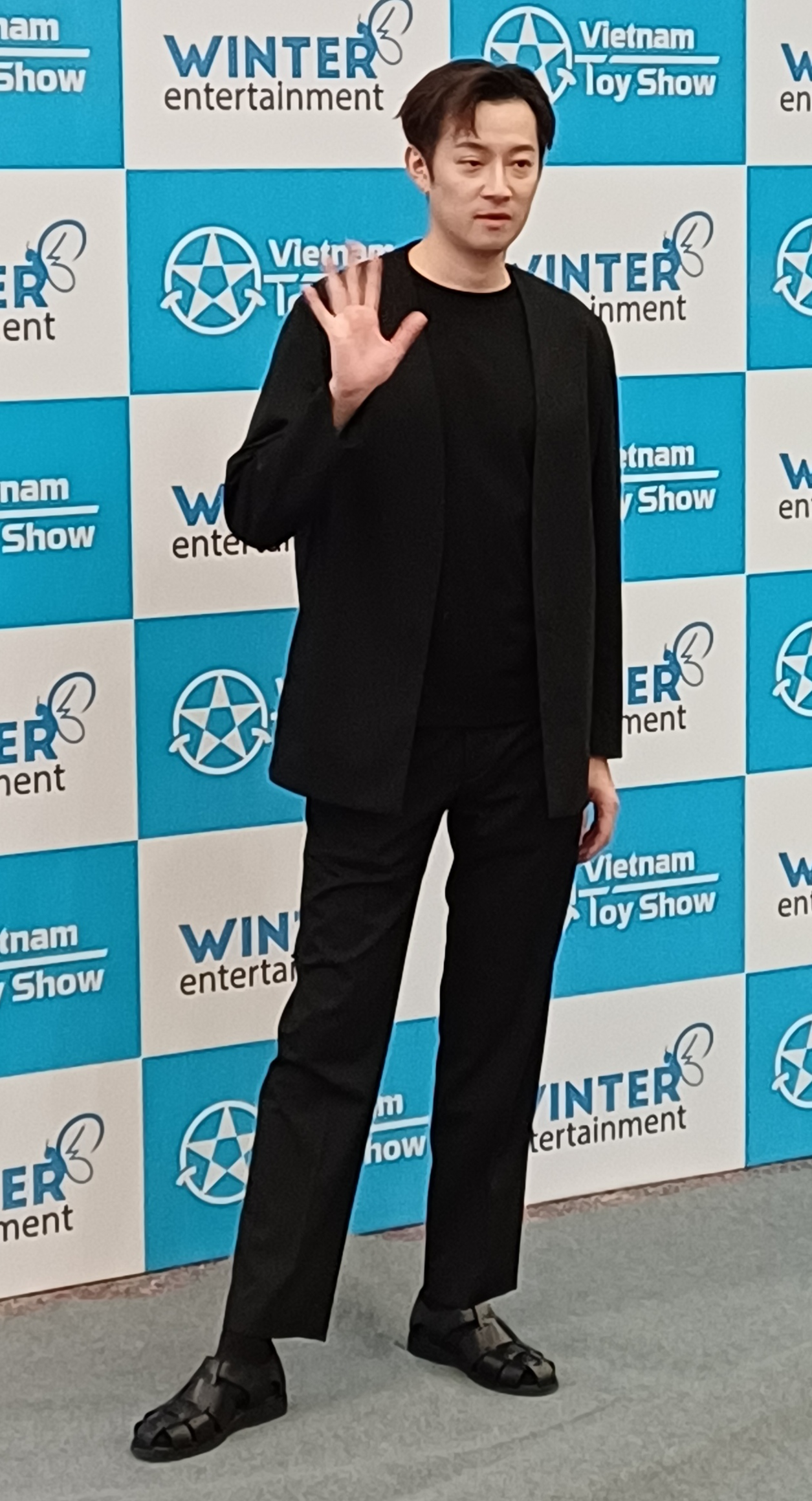
- Yoshida at a fan meeting event in Vietnam, 2024
- Born: July 9, 1982 (age 44); Nagaoka, Niigata Prefecture, Japan
- Years active: 2003 - 2018; 2024
- Height: 182 cm (6 ft 0 in)
- Spouse: Mika Kikuchi (m. 2018)
- Website: www.agape-ag.co.jp/tomokazu/

Tomokazu Yoshida (吉田 友一, Yoshida Tomokazu; born July 9, 1982 in Nagaoka, Niigata Prefecture, Japan) is a former Japanese actor and model previously under the management of Agape and Avex Entertainment.

== Career ==
In 2018, Yoshida married Mika Kikuchi, his co-star from Tokusou Sentai Dekaranger. In the same announcement, he announced that he was retiring from acting to become an acupuncturist.

=== Post-actor career ===
Yoshida would later briefly step out from retirement to reprise his role as Tekkan alongside his other co-stars in Tokusou Sentai Dekaranger 20th: Fireball Booster. He was in the prefectural regional revitalization cooperation team in Kochi City, where he currently lives, to promote the city for production of the movie to be located in alongside tourism.

== Filmography ==
=== Television ===
- Lion Sensei (ライオン先生) - (2003)
- Tokusou Sentai Dekaranger - as Aira Tekkan - Tetsu / Deka Break 2004 - 2005
- Kanojo Ga Shinjyatta (彼女が死んじゃった) - 9th episode 2004
- Light Will Shine (陽はいつか昇る) - as Honda 2004
- Koinu No Waltz (仔犬のワルツ) - 2004 2nd episode
- Tantei Boogie (探偵ブギ) - 2006 as Yoshihiko Miura
- Shimokita GLORY DAYS (下北GLORY DAYS)
- Dance Drill Musume (ダンドリ娘) - 2006 as Tarzan
- Delicious Gakuin (美味學院) - 10th episode
- Ushi Ni Negai Wo: Love and Farm (牛に願いを) - 2007 as Taku Shimaoka
- Tadashii Ouji no Tsukuri Kata (正しい王子のつくり方) - 2008 as Shibukawa Mamoru

=== Movies ===
- Tokusou Sentai Dekaranger The Movie: Full Blast Action 2004
- Tokusou Sentai Dekaranger vs. Abaranger (特捜戦隊デカレンジャー VS アバレンジャー) - 2005
- Yoshitsune to Benkei (義経と弁慶(藤原泰衡))
- Mahou Sentai Magiranger VS Dekaranger (魔法戦隊マジレンジャー VS デカレンジャー) - 2006
- GoGo Sentai Boukenger vs. Super Sentai (轟轟戦隊ボウケンジャー VS スーパー戦隊) - 2007

=== Dubbing ===
- Power Rangers S.P.D. - Sam/SPD Omega Ranger
