= Tokusou Sentai Dekaranger =

28th season of the Super Sentai series

- Genre: Tokusatsu; Superhero fiction Comedy; Action; Crime; Sci-Fi; Thriller; Mystery fiction Police procedural
- Created by: Toei Company
- Developed by: Naruhisa Arakawa
- Directed by: Katsuya Watanabe
- Starring: Ryuji Sainei; Tsuyoshi Hayashi; Yousuke Itou; Ayumi Kinoshita; Mika Kikuchi; Tomokazu Yoshida; Mako Ishino
- Voices of: Tetsu Inada; Ryusei Nakao
- Narrated by: Toshio Furukawa
- Opening theme: "Tokusou Sentai Dekaranger" by Psychic Lover
- Ending theme: "Midnight Dekaranger" by Isao Sasaki; "Girls in trouble! DEKARANGER" by Jasmine & Umeko with Dekaren Boys
- Composer: Kōichirō Kameyama
- Country of origin: Japan
- No. of episodes: 50 (list of episodes)

Production
- Executive producer: Takeyuki Suzuki (Toei)
- Producers: Schreck Hedwick (TV Asahi); Hideaki Tsukada (Toei); Masamichi Tsuchida (Toei); Kōichi Yada (Toei Agency)
- Production locations: Tokyo, Japan (Greater Tokyo Area)
- Running time: 24–25 minutes
- Production companies: TV Asahi; Toei Company; Toei Agency

Original release
- Network: ANN (TV Asahi)
- Release: February 15, 2004 – February 6, 2005

Related
- Bakuryū Sentai Abaranger; Mahō Sentai Magiranger

Tokusou Sentai Dekaranger (特捜戦隊デカレンジャー, Tokusō Sentai Dekarenjā; Special Police Squadron Dekaranger) (Note: Tokusō (特捜) translates as "Special Investigation". In the series context, the word "Special Police" (omitting the "Sentai" name) was used as the English translation of the series title.) (Note: Deka (刑事) is the Japanese colloquial slang for a detective on the police force, and is also Greek for the number 10.) is a Japanese Tokusatsu television show and the 28th production of the Super Sentai metaseries produced by Toei. It aired from February 15, 2004, to February 6, 2005, replacing Bakuryū Sentai Abaranger and was replaced by Mahō Sentai Magiranger. The program was part of TV Asahi's 2004 Super Hero Time block with Kamen Rider Blade. The action footage from the show was used for the American series, Power Rangers S.P.D.. Shout! Factory released the series on Region 1 DVD in the United States on February 14, 2023.

== Story ==
Megalopolis, Once a peaceful Earth city, is now a haven for criminals aided by the nefarious Alienizer arms dealer, Agent Abrella. Now it's up to Ban Akaza and the Special Police Dekarangers to protect the Earth from the invading Alienizers and finally bring peace and justice back to the planet.

== Episodes ==
No.	English title Original Japanese title	Directed by	Written by	Original release date
1	"Fireball Newcomer"; Transliteration: "Faiyābōru Nyūkamā" (Japanese: ファイヤーボール・ニューカマー)	Katsuya Watanabe	Naruhisa Arakawa	February 15, 2004
2	"Robo Impact"; Transliteration: "Robo Inpakuto" (Japanese: ロボ・インパクト)	Katsuya Watanabe	Naruhisa Arakawa	February 22, 2004
3	"Perfect Blue"; Transliteration: "Pāfekuto Burū" (Japanese: パーフェクト・ブルー)	Masato Tsujino	Naruhisa Arakawa	February 29, 2004
4	"Cyber Dive"; Transliteration: "Saibā Daibu" (Japanese: サイバー・ダイブ)	Masato Tsujino	Naruhisa Arakawa	March 7, 2004
5	"Buddy Murphy"; Transliteration: "Badi Māfī" (Japanese: バディ・マーフィー)	Noboru Takemoto	Naruhisa Arakawa	March 14, 2004
6	"Green Mystery"; Transliteration: "Gurīn Misuterī" (Japanese: グリーン・ミステリー)	Noboru Takemoto	Naruhisa Arakawa	March 21, 2004
7	"Silent Telepathy"; Transliteration: "Sairento Terepashī" (Japanese: サイレント・テレパシー)	Katsuya Watanabe	Naruhisa Arakawa	March 28, 2004
8	"Rainbow Vision"; Transliteration: "Reinbō Bijon" (Japanese: レインボー・ビジョン)	Katsuya Watanabe	Naruhisa Arakawa	April 4, 2004
9	"Stakeout Trouble"; Transliteration: "Suteikuauto Toraburu" (Japanese: ステイクアウト・トラブル)	Taro Sakamoto	Junki Takegami	April 11, 2004
10	"Trust Me"; Transliteration: "Torasuto Mī" (Japanese: トラスト・ミー)	Taro Sakamoto	Junki Takegami	April 18, 2004
11	"Pride Sniper"; Transliteration: "Puraido Sunaipā" (Japanese: プライド・スナイパー)	Shojiro Nakazawa	Naruhisa Arakawa	April 25, 2004
12	"Babysitter Syndrome"; Transliteration: "Bebīshittā Shindorōmu" (Japanese: ベビーシッター・シンドローム)	Shojiro Nakazawa	Naruhisa Arakawa	May 2, 2004
13	"High Noon Dogfight"; Transliteration: "Hai Nūn Doggufaito" (Japanese: ハイヌーン・ドッグファイト)	Noboru Takemoto	Naruhisa Arakawa	May 9, 2004
14	"Please, Boss"; Transliteration: "Purīzu Bosu" (Japanese: プリーズ・ボス)	Noboru Takemoto	Naruhisa Arakawa	May 16, 2004
15	"Android Girl"; Transliteration: "Andoroido Gāru" (Japanese: アンドロイド・ガール)	Katsuya Watanabe	Junki Takegami	May 23, 2004
16	"Giant Destroyer"; Transliteration: "Jaianto Desutoroiyā" (Japanese: ジャイアント・デストロイヤー)	Katsuya Watanabe	Junki Takegami	May 30, 2004
17	"Twin Cam Angel"; Transliteration: "Tsuin Kamu Enjeru" (Japanese: ツインカム・エンジェル)	Katsuya Watanabe	Naruhisa Arakawa	June 6, 2004
18	"Samurai, Go West"; Transliteration: "Samurai Gō Uesuto" (Japanese: サムライ・ゴーウエスト)	Taro Sakamoto	Naruhisa Arakawa	June 13, 2004
19	"Fake Blue"; Transliteration: "Feiku Burū" (Japanese: フェイク・ブルー)	Taro Sakamoto	Naruhisa Arakawa	June 27, 2004
20	"Running Hero"; Transliteration: "Ranningu Hīrō" (Japanese: ランニング・ヒーロー)	Noboru Takemoto	Michiko Yokote	July 4, 2004
21	"Mad Brothers"; Transliteration: "Maddo Burazāzu" (Japanese: マッド・ブラザーズ)	Noboru Takemoto	Junki Takegami	July 11, 2004
22	"Full Throttle Elite"; Transliteration: "Furu Surottoru Erīto" (Japanese: フルスロットル・エリート)	Shojiro Nakazawa	Naruhisa Arakawa	July 18, 2004
23	"Brave Emotion"; Transliteration: "Bureibu Emōshon" (Japanese: ブレイブ・エモーション)	Shojiro Nakazawa	Naruhisa Arakawa	July 25, 2004
24	"Cutie Negotiator"; Transliteration: "Kyūtī Negoshietā" (Japanese: キューティー・ネゴシエイター)	Masato Tsujino	Junki Takegami	August 1, 2004
25	"Witness Grandma"; Transliteration: "Wittonesu Guranma" (Japanese: ウィットネス・グランマ)	Masato Tsujino	Junki Takegami	August 8, 2004
26	"Cool Passion"; Transliteration: "Kūru Passhon" (Japanese: クール・パッション)	Taro Sakamoto	Michiko Yokote	August 15, 2004
27	"Funky Prisoner"; Transliteration: "Fankī Purizunā" (Japanese: ファンキー・プリズナー)	Taro Sakamoto	Naruhisa Arakawa	August 22, 2004
28	"Alienizer Returns"; Transliteration: "Arienaizā Ritānzu" (Japanese: アリエナイザー・リターンズ)	Noboru Takemoto	Junki Takegami	August 29, 2004
29	"Mirror Revenger"; Transliteration: "Mirā Ribenjā" (Japanese: ミラー・リベンジャー)	Noboru Takemoto	Junki Takegami	September 5, 2004
30	"Gal Hazard"; Transliteration: "Gyaru Hazādo" (Japanese: ギャル・ハザード)	Shojiro Nakazawa	Naruhisa Arakawa	September 12, 2004
31	"Princess Training"; Transliteration: "Purinsesu Torēningu" (Japanese: プリンセス・トレーニング)	Shojiro Nakazawa	Naruhisa Arakawa	September 19, 2004
32	"Discipline March"; Transliteration: "Dishipurin Māchi" (Japanese: ディシプリン・マーチ)	Masato Tsujino	Michiko Yokote	September 26, 2004
33	"SWAT Mode On"; Transliteration: "Suwatto Mōdo On" (Japanese: スワットモード・オン)	Masato Tsujino	Michiko Yokote	October 3, 2004
34	"Celeb Game"; Transliteration: "Serebu Gēmu" (Japanese: セレブ・ゲーム)	Nobuhiro Suzumura	Junki Takegami	October 10, 2004
35	"Unsolved Case"; Transliteration: "Ansorubudo Kēsu" (Japanese: アンソルブド・ケース)	Nobuhiro Suzumura	Junki Takegami	October 17, 2004
36	"Mother Universe"; Transliteration: "Mazā Yunibāsu" (Japanese: マザー・ユニバース)	Katsuya Watanabe	Michiko Yokote	October 24, 2004
37	"Hard Boiled License"; Transliteration: "Hādo Boirudo Raisensu" (Japanese: ハードボイルド・ライセンス)	Katsuya Watanabe	Naruhisa Arakawa	October 31, 2004
38	"Cycling Bomb"; Transliteration: "Saikuringu Bomu" (Japanese: サイクリング・ボム)	Noboru Takemoto	Junki Takegami	November 7, 2004
39	"Requiem World"; Transliteration: "Rekuiemu Wārudo" (Japanese: レクイエム・ワールド)	Noboru Takemoto	Naruhisa Arakawa	November 14, 2004
40	"Gold Badge Education"; Transliteration: "Gōrudo Bajji Edyukēshon" (Japanese: ゴールドバッヂ・エデュケーション)	Shojiro Nakazawa	Michiko Yokote	November 21, 2004
41	"Trick Room"; Transliteration: "Torikku Rūmu" (Japanese: トリック・ルーム)	Shojiro Nakazawa	Junki Takegami	November 28, 2004
42	"Skull Talking"; Transliteration: "Sukaru Tōkingu" (Japanese: スカル・トーキング)	Taro Sakamoto	Naruhisa Arakawa	December 5, 2004
43	"Meteor Catastrophe"; Transliteration: "Meteo Katasutorofu" (Japanese: メテオ・カタストロフ)	Taro Sakamoto	Naruhisa Arakawa	December 12, 2004
44	"Mortal Campaign"; Transliteration: "Mōtaru Kyanpēn" (Japanese: モータル・キャンペーン)	Nobuhiro Suzumura	Junki Takegami	December 19, 2004
45	"Accidental Present"; Transliteration: "Akushidentaru Purezento" (Japanese: アクシデンタル・プレゼント)	Nobuhiro Suzumura	Michiko Yokote	December 26, 2004
46	"Propose Panic"; Transliteration: "Puropōzu Panikku" (Japanese: プロポーズ・パニック)	Shojiro Nakazawa	Naruhisa Arakawa	January 9, 2005
47	"Wild Heart, Cool Brain"; Transliteration: "Wairudo Hāto Kūru Burein" (Japanese: ワイルドハート・クールブレイン)	Shojiro Nakazawa	Junki Takegami	January 16, 2005
48	"Fireball Succession"; Transliteration: "Faiyābōru Sakuseshon" (Japanese: ファイヤーボール・サクセション)	Noboru Takemoto	Michiko Yokote	January 23, 2005
49	"Devil's Deka Base"; Transliteration: "Debiruzu Deka Bēsu" (Japanese: デビルズ・デカベース)	Noboru Takemoto	Naruhisa Arakawa	January 30, 2005
50 (Final)	"Forever Dekaranger"; Transliteration: "Fōebā Dekarenjā" (Japanese: フォーエバー・デカレンジャー)	Noboru Takemoto	Naruhisa Arakawa	February 6, 2005

== Production ==
The trademark for the series was filed by Toei Company on October 10, 2003.

== Films and specials ==
=== Theatrical ===
==== Full Blast Action ====
Tokusou Sentai Dekaranger The Movie: Full Blast Action (特捜戦隊デカレンジャー THE MOVIE フルブラスト・アクション, Tokusō Sentai Dekarenjā Za Mūbī Furu Burasto Akushon) opened in Japanese theaters on September 11, 2004, double-billed with Kamen Rider Blade: Missing Ace. The event of the movie takes place between Episodes 23 and 24.

=== V-Cinema ===
==== Dekaranger vs. Abaranger ====
Tokusou Sentai Dekaranger vs. Abaranger (特捜戦隊デカレンジャーVSアバレンジャー, Tokusō Sentai Dekarenjā Tai Abarenjā) was released direct-to-video on March 25, 2005, featuring a crossover between the Dekaranger and Bakuryū Sentai Abaranger cast and characters. The event of the movie takes place between Episodes 31 and 32.

==== Magiranger vs. Dekaranger ====
Mahō Sentai Magiranger vs. Dekaranger (魔法戦隊マジレンジャーVSデカレンジャー, Mahō Sentai Magirenjā Tai Dekarenjā) was released direct-to-video on March 10, 2006, featuring a crossover between the Mahō Sentai Magiranger and Dekaranger cast and characters.

==== 10 Years After ====
Tokusou Sentai Dekaranger: 10 Years After (特捜戦隊デカレンジャー 10 YEARS AFTER, Tokusō Sentai Dekarenjā Ten Iyāzu Afutā) was released direct-to-video on October 7, 2015, to commemorate the 10th anniversary of the conclusion of the series, the second such epilogue movie of its kind following Ninpuu Sentai Hurricaneger: 10 Years After. The events of this film take place 8 years after the final episode of the series.

Eight years after saving the S.P.D. from Agent Abrella's scheme, the Dekarangers parted ways with Ban joining the Fire Squad, Jasmine marrying Hikaru Hiwatari (who had graduated in the Space Police Academy and grown close to Jasmine when he met her again after being assigned to the Earth Branch), and Swan working independently while Tetsu, Hoji, Sen, and Umeko continue working under Doggie Kruger. But after an incident occurred that hospitalized Kruger on planet Revaful wherein he was labeled as a dirty cop for an apparent dealing with the Qurlian Crime Family, which went awry with the death of a civilian witness, Tetsu takes over the Earth Branch. Two years later, joined by rookie officers Assam Asimov and Mugi Grafton, who had taken over the positions of Deka Red and Deka Yellow respectively, Hoji, Sen and Umeko encounter a Clementian named Carrie who is being hunted by Mechanoids. Once taken to the Deka Base, Carrie reveals to Tetsu that she has relevant info on the Kruger case, with Tetsu calling Ban to Earth to personally escort the witness to the Space Prosecution Office on planet Gowashichoru. Though Umeko believes Kruger is innocent, she is mortified with the rest of the team not wanting to prove his innocence. When Ban is ordered to return to his branch on orders from the Galactic District Police Bureau chief Kight Reidlich, Tetsu decides to have his team oversee the escort, but the escort ship is sent crashing onto the barren planet Riiyo where the Dekarangers fend off the Mechanoids before Deka Blue runs off with Deka Green following him to the Mechanoids' ship while Umeko learns that Assam and Mugi are part of the party keeping Carrie from reaching Gowashichoru as they take her to their boss. Umeko finds out, "Carrie" is revealed to be Ban in disguise so the real one could reach her destination safely, she and Sen were kept in the dark as the rest of their team have been working to clear Kruger's death by exposing the real murderer of Carrie's father: Kight Reidlich. Once justice is served, Carrie thanks the Dekarangers and leaves while Kruger finally admits his feelings for Swan.

==== Space Squad ====
In 2016, it was announced on Toei's press release that a crossover between Space Sheriff Gavan: The Movie and Dekaranger, titled Space Squad: Space Sheriff Gavan vs. Tokusou Sentai Dekaranger (スペース・スクワッド 宇宙刑事ギャバンVS特捜戦隊デカレンジャー, Supēsu Sukuwaddo Uchū Keiji Gyaban Tai Tokusō Sentai Dekarenjā) was set to release in 2017.

==== Fireball Booster ====
Tokusou Sentai Dekaranger 20th: Fireball Booster (特捜戦隊デカレンジャー 20th ファイヤーボール・ブースター, Tokusō Sentai Dekarenjā Tuentīsu Faiyābōru Būsutā) is a 2024 V-Cinema release, which received a limited theatrical release on June 7, 2024, and a home video release on November 13, 2024, to commemorate the 20th anniversary of the conclusion of the series, making of Dekaranger the third sentai to receive a special 20th anniversary film after Ninpu Sentai Hurricaneger and Bakuryū Sentai Abaranger.

=== Other specials ===
- Tokusou Sentai Dekaranger Super Video: Super Finisher Match! Deka Red vs. Deka Break (特捜戦隊デカレンジャー スーパービデオ 超必殺わざ勝負! デカレッドVSデカブレイク, Tokusō Sentai Dekarenjā Sūpā Bideo Chō Hissatsuwaza Shōbu! Deka Reddo Tai Deka Bureiku): A special video produced by Kadokawa Shoten, featuring a showdown between Deka Red and Deka Break over who the better Dekaranger is.
- Hero Mama League (ヒーローママ★リーグ, Hīrō Mama Rīgu): A 2018 Toei Tokusatsu Fan Club-exclusive special.
- Tokusou Sentai Dekaranger with Tombo Ohger (特捜戦隊デカレンジャーwithトンボオージャー, Tokusō Sentai Dekarenjā Wizu Tonbo Ōjā): A web-exclusive crossover special between Dekaranger and Ohsama Sentai King-Ohger released on Toei Tokusatsu Fan Club on June 16, 2024. The special also serves as a prequel to Tokusou Sentai Dekaranger 20th: Fireball Booster.

== Novel ==
Novel: Tokusou Sentai Dekaranger: Full Blast Labyrinth (小説 特捜戦隊デカレンジャー フルブラスト・ラビリンス, Shōsetsu Tokusō Sentai Dekarenjā Furu Burasuto Rabirinsu) is a novel written by Hideaki Tsukada and scheduled to be released on November 30, 2026.

== Cast ==
- Banban Akaza (赤座 伴番, Akaza Banban): Ryuji Sainei (載寧 龍二, Sainei Ryūji)
- Houji Tomasu (戸増 宝児, Tomasu Hōji): (Note: Also spelt as Houji Tomas and Hoji Tomasu.) Tsuyoshi Hayashi (林 剛史, Hayashi Tsuyoshi)
- Senichi Enari (江成 仙一, Enari Sen'ichi): Yosuke Ito (伊藤 陽佑, Itō Yōsuke)
- Marika Reimon (礼紋 茉莉花, Reimon Marika): Ayumi Kinoshita (木下 あゆ美, Kinoshita Ayumi)
- Koume Kodou (胡堂 小梅, Kodō Koume): (Note: Also spelt as Koume Kodo.) Mika Kikuchi (菊地 美香, Kikuchi Mika)
- Tekkan Aira (姶良 鉄幹, Aira Tekkan): Tomokazu Yoshida (吉田 友一, Yoshida Tomokazu)
- Swan Shiratori (白鳥 スワン, Shiratori Suwan): Mako Ishino (石野 真子, Ishino Mako)

=== Voice cast ===
- Doggie Kruger (ドギー・クルーガー, Dogī Kurūgā): (Note: Also spelt as Doggy Kruger and Doggy Krueger.) Tetsu Inada (稲田 徹, Inada Tetsu)
- Numa-O (ヌマ・O, Numa Ō): Kazuhiko Kishino (岸野 一彦, Kishino Kazuhiko)
- Agent Abrella (エージェント・アブレラ, Ējento Aburera): Ryūsei Nakao (中尾 隆聖, Nakao Ryūsei)
- Deka Base (デカベース, Deka Bēsu) Announcement: Shunsuke Ochiai (落合 隼亮, Ochiai Shunsuke)
- Narrator: Toshio Furukawa (古川 登志夫, Furukawa Toshio)

== Songs ==
Opening theme

- "Tokusou Sentai Dekaranger" (特捜戦隊デカレンジャー, Tokusō Sentai Dekarenjā)
  - Lyrics: Yumi Yoshimoto (吉元 由美, Yoshimoto Yumi)
  - Composition: Ayumi Miyazaki
  - Arrangement: Seiichi Kyōda (京田 誠一, Kyōda Seiichi)
  - Artist: Psychic Lover

Ending themes

- "Midnight Dekaranger" (ミッドナイト デカレンジャー, Middonaito Dekarenjā)
  - Lyrics: Shoko Fujibayashi
  - Composition: Hideaki Takatori
  - Arrangement: Kōichirō Kameyama (亀山 耕一郎, Kameyama Kōichirō)
  - Artist: Isao Sasaki
- "Girls in trouble! DEKARANGER"
  - Lyrics: Shoko Fujibayashi
  - Composition: Yūmao
  - Arrangement: Yukihiko Nishihata (西端 幸彦, Nishihata Yukihiko)
  - Artist: Jasmine (ジャスミン, Jasumin) & Umeko (ウメコ) with Dekaren Boys (デカレンボーイズ, Dekaren Bōizu) (Ayumi Kinoshita, Mika Kikuchi, Ryuji Sainei, Tsuyoshi Hayashi, Yousuke Itou)
  - Episodes: 17, 24, 27, 31, 35 & 39
