= Chō Ninja Tai Inazuma! =

Japanese comedy series

Cho Ninja Tai Inazuma! (超忍者隊イナズマ!, Cho Ninja Tai Inazuma!, translated as Super Ninja Force Inazuma!) is a Japanese tokusatsu direct-to-video comedy series produced by Toei Video that was released in June 2006. Its sequel, which began filming on February 23, 2007, is titled Cho Ninja Tai Inazuma!! SPARK (超忍者隊イナズマ!!ＳＰＡＲＫ, Cho Ninja Tai Inazuma!! Supāku), and was released July 21, 2007.

The series itself is in the jidaigeki genre (Japanese for an Edo period drama). The cast of both movies feature actors from the Super Sentai Series' recent programs, primarily from Tokusou Sentai Dekaranger and Mahō Sentai Magiranger. As a result, the series' characters would often reference their original characters.

Jun Terada is a producer in the year 2076 and is trying to convince the president of Magical TV to allow her to create her life's work, Cho Ninja Tai Inazuma!, based on the long-standing legend of a legendary lightning that bestows powers upon those struck by it. However, because the show is to be the 100th anniversary of the Hyper Hero Team Series" (ハイパー勇者隊シリーズ, Haipā Yūshatai Shirīzu), it must be a first for the 100-year-long franchise. President Mishima convinces her to turn it into a reality show by traveling back to 1720 in the Edo period and picking three extremely inept locals and force them through humiliating training to become ninja.

When Jun and her writing partner Kuratanomiya arrive in the past, they find Hosomatsu, Kankichi, and Kaguya, three extremely cowardly, inept, and clumsy individuals, to be the stars of their show. Jun, as a Kami, begins to train the three, fooling them with futuristic technology and giving them self-confidence. Unbeknownst to Jun and Kuratanomiya, there are actual monsters killing various people throughout O-Edo, while Jun trains her Inazuma team. When Kuratanomiya encounters the villains on a night on the town, who turn out to be the trio's idols possessed by evil slug-like monsters, Jun must reveal the truth to her stars that they are without power, but the trio decide to fight anyway with Jun's earlier words taken to heart. But learning that the legendary lightning exists, Jun discovers that it's the spark from the glitches in the time teleport system that created the monster slugs. With that knowledge, Jun sends Kuratanomiya back to the future so she can become an antenna for the legendary lightning and empower the Inazuma team before they are killed by the three monsters.

Of past Super Sentai actors, two of them came from the cast of Tokusou Sentai Dekaranger (Ryuji Sainei, who played Kuratanomiya, also played Ban/DekaRed; and Mika Kikuchi, who played, Jun, also played Umeko/DekaPink), while many others were from Mahou Sentai Magiranger (Atsushi Hashimoto, who played Hosomatsu/Raiden, also played Kai/MagiRed; Hiroya Matsumoto, who played Kankichi/Senden, also played Tsubasa/MagiYellow; Asami Kai, who played Kaguya/Shiden, also played Urara/MagiBlue; Ayumi Beppu, who played Woman Space Sheriff Beppy, also played Houka/MagiPink, Yuki Ito, who played Tojiro/Tōrōki, also played Makito/MagiGreen; Yousuke Ichikawa, who played Terunosuke/Dokuyamo, also played Hikaru/MagiShine; and Meibi Yamanouchi, who played Ito/Jorōgumo, also played Heavenly Saint Lunagel).

== Characters ==
=== Inazuma ===
- Hosomatsu (細松, Hosomatsu)/Raiden (雷電, Raiden, literally "Thunder and Lightning"): A metal crafter in Terunosuke's service who is originally very cowardly, being less so after becoming an Inazuma and taking Jun's words to heart. As Raiden he is the Red Lightning (赤の稲妻, Aka no Inazuma) and is proficient in the Ou shuriken attack. In addition, when the powers of the other Inazuma are infused into him, he can create a giant shadow duplicate of himself which battles the bugs after they combine into a giant monster.
- Kankichi (寒吉, Kankichi)/Senden (閃電, Senden, literally "Flash of Lightning"): A carpenter who is originally very inept at fighting. As Senden he is the Yellow Lightning (黄色の稲妻, Kiiro no Inazuma) and is proficient with his Dekee Bomb attack.
- Kaguya (かぐや, Kaguya)/Shiden (紫電, Shiden, literally "Purple Lightning"): A snack shop girl who is originally very clumsy, considering Tojiro as her mentor. As Shiden she is the Purple Lightning (紫の稲妻, Murasaki no Inazuma) and is proficient with katana. She was at Nagasaki during the events of Inazuma SPARK with Tojiro.

=== Allies ===
- Jun Terada (寺田 ジュン, Terada Jun): A television producer with a romantic outlook on things, her previous Hyper Hero Series show, Woman Space Sheriff Beppy, flopped with very low ratings and it was cancelled. She was given a chance to redeem herself with the Inazuma series. Under the guise of Kami, Jun recruit the Inazuma team, placing them through training until things got too dangerous and forced to reveal herself to the clueless trio. She played a part in making them true heroes before returning to her time to re-envision the show in the direction of her time at the Edo Era. The show was such a success, that she produces the sequel series.
- Takanao Kuratanomiya (倉田宮 敬直, Kuratanomiya Takanao): Despite being Jun's assistant, Kuratanomiya is a realist and often thinks of her as foolish; however, he remains loyal to her. He acts like a foil and remote controls the Crow Camera. He gets to direct the Spark series.

=== Edo Era ===
- Terunosuke (輝之助, Terunosuke): A young lord who owns of fabrics shop was admired by Hosomatsu, who serves under him. He was possessed by one of the slugs, wearing a lizard-like helmet and took on the name Dokuyamo (毒守宮, Dokuyamo, literally "Poisonous Lizard").
- Ito (いと, Ito): Terunosuke's sister who Kankichi respected. She was possessed by one of the slugs, wearing a spider-like helmet and took on the name Jorōgumo (女郎蜘蛛, Jorōgumo, literally "Lady Spider"). While under the monster's control, she uses silk-based attacks.
- Tojiro (藤十郎, Tojirō): A former ronin under Terunosuke, whom Kaguya had feelings for. He was possessed by one of the slugs, wearing a dragon/mantis-like mask and took the name of Tōrōki (蟷螂鬼, Tōrōki, literally "Mantis Demon"). While under the monster's control, he uses sickles as his weapons.

=== Magical TV ===
- Mishima (三島, Mishima): President of Magical TV, Jun's boss, and Tsubame's father.

=== Cast ===
- Hosomatsu/Raiden: Atsushi Hashimoto (From Magiranger)
- Kankichi/Senden: Hiroya Matsumoto (From Magiranger)
- Kaguya/Shiden: Asami Kai (From Magiranger)
- Terunosuke/Dokuyamo: Yousuke Ichikawa (From Magiranger)
- Ito/Jorōgumo: Meibi Yamanouchi (From Magiranger)
- Tojiro/Tōrōki: Yuki Ito (From Magiranger)
- Jun Terada: Mika Kikuchi (From Dekaranger)
- Takanao Kuratanomiya: Ryuji Sainei (From Dekaranger)
- Ronin: Seizō Fukumoto
- Woman Space Sheriff Beppy: Ayumi Beppu (From Magiranger)

=== Songs ===
Opening Theme
"Cho Ninja Tai Inazuma!" (超忍者隊イナズマ！, Cho Ninja Tai Inazuma!) by Ichirou Mizuki
Ending Theme
"Thank you" by Mika Kikuchi, Asami Kai, and Meibi Yamanouchi

== Cho Ninja Tai Inazuma!! SPARK ==
Cho Ninja Tai Inazuma!! SPARK (超忍者隊イナズマ!!ＳＰＡＲＫ, Cho Ninja Tai Inazuma!! Supāku) is the sequel to Cho Ninja Tai Inazuma!. A year after the prequel's events, Jun is now producing a sequel to her original show and has the daughter of Magical TV's president as her female lead. However, Tsubame is unable to keep herself from helping those she feels are in need, and she is accidentally sent to the Edo period where she tries to befriend a ronin shinobi. Hosomatsu and Kankichi are trying to find out who is killing all of daimyo, but Kaguya is traveling with Tojiro, so they are down one member as Inazuma.

Tsubame tries to get Hayate to smile, but she learns of the loss of his sister and how he is determined to seek suicidal revenge. When Jun finally finds Tsubame in the past using the original defective time teleporter, Tsubame realizes she must stay to save Hayate, sends Jun back to be deliberately struck by the legendary lightning herself. She then fights the two aliens who had behind the attacks as the newest Inazuma and to save Raiden and Senden who had been trapped.

In this new cast, from past Super Sentai incarnations came two actors from GoGo Sentai Boukenger (Mitsuomi Takahashi, who played Hayate, also played Akashi/BoukenRed; and Mami Yamasaki, who played Tsubame/Hien, played Kaze no Shizuka), while Ayumi Beppu, who played Ayumiko and Hayabusa, also played Houka/MagiPink in Mahou Sentai Magiranger.

=== New characters ===
- Tsubame Mishima (三島 つばめ, Mishima Tsubame) / Hien (飛燕, Hien, literally "Swallow in Flight", "Tsubame" is also Japanese for swallow): Flightly female lead of Jun Terada's second program in the Chō Ninja Tai Inazuma! series and the daughter of the president of Magical TV, the kind of person who cannot resist to help those in need. She accidentally activate the Teleport Room and ends up in 1721, attempting to learn how to become a better ninja from Hayate, whom she fall in love at first sight. Wanting to help him, Tsubame deliberately hits herself with the Legendary Lightning to fight the Gezoians. In the end, Tsubame returns to her time with Hayate. As Hien, she is the Blue Lightning (青の稲妻, Ao no Inazuma).
- Hayate (ハヤテ, Hayate): An aloof Iga shinobi who worked under Sendai until Aoba Castle was destroyed by the Gezoians, who later murdered his sister. With the item his sister gave him, Hayate pursued the Gezoians, though they were a step ahead of him. It was due to Tsubame's constant attempts to befriend him that Hayate finally opened up and smile and end his suicidal lust for revenge. In the end, Hayate faked his death so he join Tsubame in going to the future and work for Magic TV. While there, he learns of Ayumiko and wanted to meet her due to the resemblance to his sister, only to be scared to death of her upon meeting Ayumiko.
- Hayabusa (ハヤブサ, Hayabusa): Hayate's slain sister and kunoichi, she was murdered by the Gezoians when she attempted to avenge the residents of Aoba Castle.
- Gezoians (ゲぞ星人, Gezo Seijin): A pair of ammonite-headed aliens, named Suru (スル) and Mē (メー), with a superiority complex from planet Gezo in a farway galaxy, using two suits of samurai armor as puppets to act for them on Earth. Since the Aoba incident they caused, they started to slaughter various daimyos while searching for Japan's protected key point, Edo Castle, to bring ruin to the country so their people can take it over. When they wounded Hayabusa, she took one of the egg-like jewels from their chests and gave it to her brother to aid him in tracking them down. Their actions attracted Inazuma's attention, sealing Raiden and Senden in gourd to prevent their interference. The two then overpower Hayate when he attempted to get his revenge on them, only to be halted by Hien who destroyed the puppets. Enraged, the jewelless Gezoian with golden teeth battle Hien, using the prison gourd to have an advantage until she uses a decoy bomb to get the gourd to free Raiden and Senden before killing the guy. The other blue-toothed Gezoian attempts to retreat with intent to get reinforcements, only for Tsubume to assume Ou-Tsubame form and chase the UFO into space, blasting it to bits.
- Shōryūsai Mizuki (水木 昇竜斎, Mizuki Shōryūsai): A popular singer in O-Edo who sings of the exploits of the Inazuma team.
- Ayumiko Kitabeppu (北別府 あゆみ子, Kitabeppu Ayumiko): The actress who portrayed the title character in Woman Space Sheriff Beppy (女宇宙刑事ベッピー, On'na Uchū Keiji Beppī). Despite its cancellation, the show gains enough popularity to release DVDs by 2077 during the events of Inazuma!! SPARK. Hayate notices a resemblance in Ayumiko Kitabeppu his slain sister Hayabusa from the Edo period and wants to meet her. However, the fact that Ayumiko is a flashy shallow girl frightens Hayate to death.

=== New cast ===
- Tsubame Mishima/Hien: Mami Yamasaki (From Boukenger)
- Hayate: Mitsuomi Takahashi (From Boukenger)
- Ayumiko Kitabeppu / Hayabusa: Ayumi Beppu (From Magiranger)
- Shōryūsai Mizuki: Ichirou Mizuki
- Gezoian Suru: Yūsuke Numata
- Gezoian Mē: Masato Hirano

=== Songs ===
Opening theme
"Cho Ninja Tai Inazuma!! SPARK" (超忍者隊イナズマ!!ＳＰＡＲＫ, Chō Ninja Tai Inazuma!! Supāku) by Mitsuko Horie
Insert song
"Cho Ninja Tai Inazuma! ~O-Edo Mix~" (超忍者隊イナズマ！～お江戸MIX～, Cho Ninja Tai Inazuma! ~O-Edo MIX~) by Shōryūsai Mizuki (Ichirou Mizuki)
Ending theme
"Thank you ~Jun 2007 Ver.~" (Thank you! ～2007ジュンVer.～) by Mika Kikuchi
