= Ryuji Sainei =

Japanese actor

- さいねい 龍二
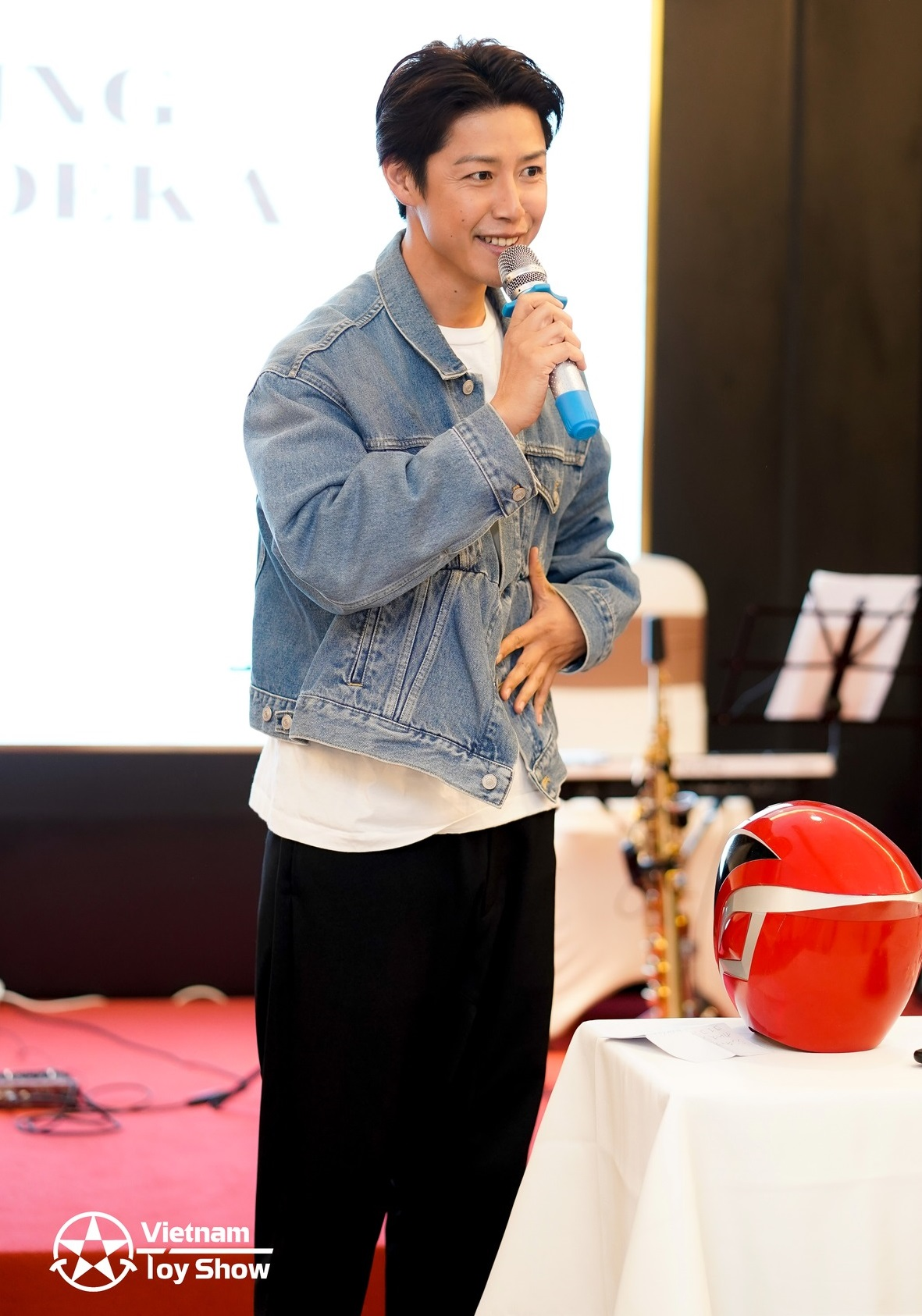
- Sainei Ryuji at the Fanmeeting event of Vietnam Toy Show on December 24, 2023
- Born: October 8, 1981 (age 44); Higashihiroshima, Hiroshima, Japan
- Other name: Ryuji Sainei (載寧 龍二)
- Occupation: Actor
- Years active: 2002-present

Ryuji Sainei (載寧 龍二, Sainei Ryūji), born on October 8, 1981, in Higashihiroshima, Hiroshima, Japan) is a Japanese actor, best known for his role as Banban "Ban" Akaza/Deka Red in the 2004 Super Sentai series Tokusou Sentai Dekaranger. He is currently a freelance actor but was affiliated with Horipro until December 31, 2014. On April 1, 2015, he changed his name to "さいねい 龍二", the same reading.

== Filmography ==
=== TV series ===
- Gokusen (2002)
- Gokusen Special (2003)
- Tokusou Sentai Dekaranger as Banban "Ban" Akaza/Deka Red (2004)
- Tokusou Sentai Dekaranger: Deka Red vs. Deka Break as Banban "Ban" Akaza/Deka Red (2004)
- Haruka 17 (2005)
- Fugo Keiji (2005)
- Fugo Keiji 2 (2006)
- Ns' Aoi (2006)
- Koi no Kara Sawagi Drama Special Love Stories IV (2007)
- Tsubasa No Oreta Tenshitachi 2 (2007)
- Sennyu Keiji Ranbo 2 (2007)
- Nanase Futatabi (2008)
- Fujoshi Deka (2008)
- My Girl (2009)
- Kaizoku Sentai Gokaiger as Banban "Ban" Akaza/Deka Red (episode 5 guest) (2011)
- Unofficial Sentai Akibaranger as himself/Banban "Ban" Akaza /Deka Red (episode 2 guest) (2012)
- Tokusou Sentai Dekaranger: 10 Years After as Banban "Ban" Akaza/Deka Red (2015)
- Uchu Sentai Kyuranger as Banban "Ban" Akaza/Deka Red (episode 18 guest) (2017)

=== Films ===
- Motorcycle (2002)
- Twilight (2003)
- Bo Taoshi! (2003)
- Tokusou Sentai Dekaranger The Movie: Full Blast Action as Banban "Ban" Akaza/Deka Red (2004)
- Tokusou Sentai Dekaranger vs. Abaranger as Banban "Ban" Akaza/Deka Red (2005)
- Chou Ninja Tai Inazuma! as Kuratanomiya (2006)
- Nekomekozo (2006)
- The Prince of Tennis as Keigo Atobe (2006)
- Drift 2 (2006)
- Mahou Sentai Magiranger vs. Dekaranger as Banban "Ban" Akaza/Deka Red (2006)
- Chou Ninja Tai Inazuma!! SPARK as Kuratanomiya (2007)
- Kamen Rider Wizard in Magic Land as Captain of the Guards (2013)
- The Blood of Wolves (2018), Kikuchi
- Last of the Wolves (2021), Kikuchi
- Love Song from Hiroshima (2025)

=== Musicals ===
- Saiyuki: Go West as Cho Hakkai (2008)
- Saiyuki: Dead or Alive as Cho Hakkai (2009)

=== Dubbing ===
- Power Rangers S.P.D. as Jack Landors/SPD Red Ranger (2005, 2011)
