= Shinji Yamashita =

Japanese actor

- 山下 真司
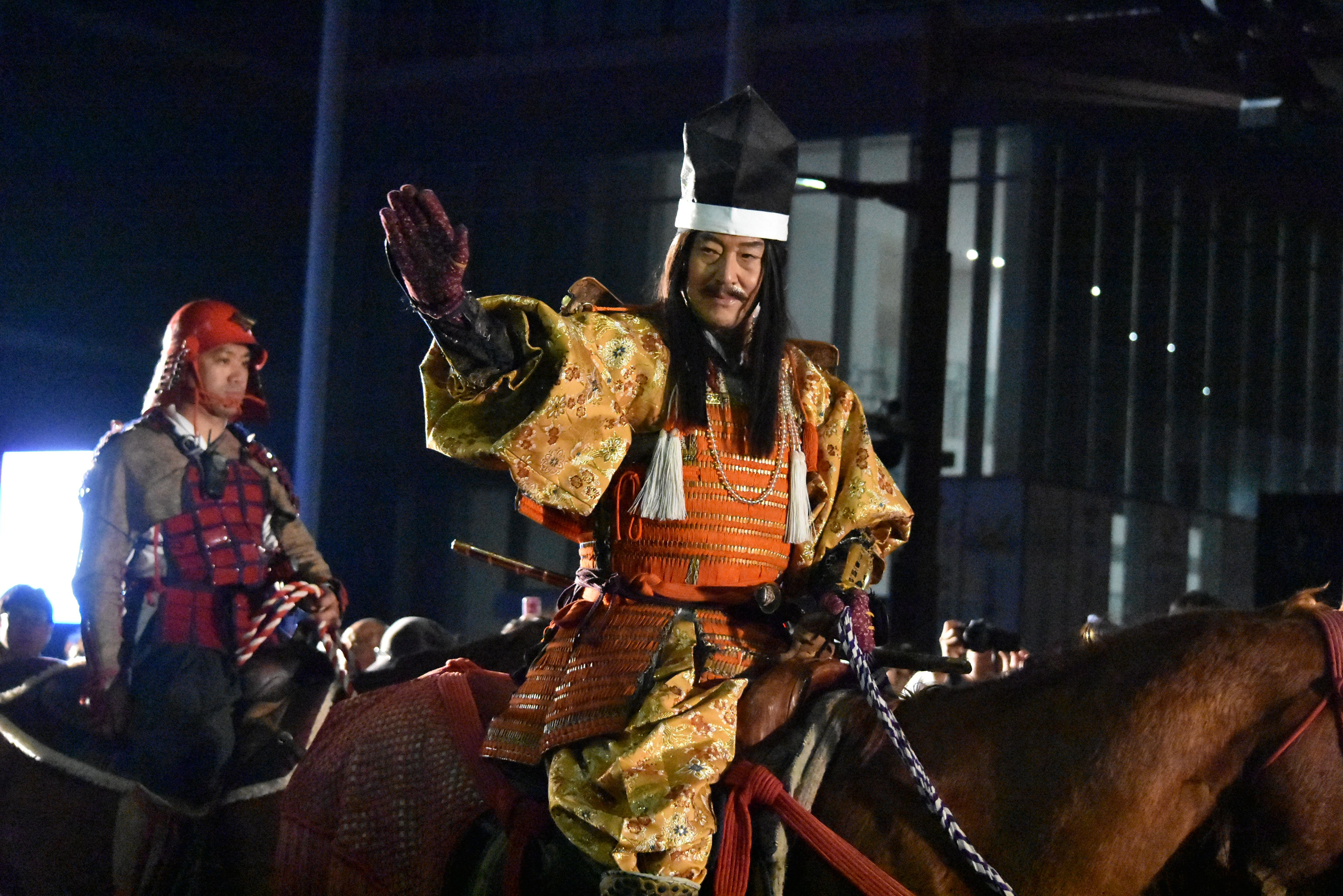
- Yamashita at the 2019 Shingen-ko Festival
- Born: December 16, 1951 (age 74); Shimonoseki, Yamaguchi Prefecture, Japan
- Occupation: Actor
- Years active: 1979–present
- Height: 183 cm (6 ft 0 in)
- Website: Official profile

Shinji Yamashita (山下 真司, Yamashita Shinji; born December 16, 1951 in Shimonoseki, Yamaguchi Prefecture, Japan) is a Japanese actor who is represented by the talent agency From First Production. He graduated from Shimonoseki Commercial High School and dropped out from Chuo University's Faculty of Letters.

== Biography ==
In 1975, Yamashita was admitted to the Bungakuza's acting school. After graduating he joined Troupe NLT. During that time, he had a part-time job in a disco in Roppongi. Yamashita's television debut was as a sneaker-wearing detective in the television series Taiyō ni Hoero! in 1979.

His first lead role was a passionate teacher in School Wars which became a hit.

Yamashita was later a reporter in the cooking travelogue program Kuishinbō! Banzai and had the longest run in that role until it was broken by Shuzo Matsuoka.

On January 19, 2014, he was the oldest actor to play a Super Sentai ranger as Kyoryu Silver in Zyuden Sentai Kyoryuger.

== Filmography ==
=== TV series ===
Year	Title	Role	Network	Notes
1979	Taiyō ni Hoero!	Jun Godai (nicknamed Sneakers)	NTV	Episodes 364 to 476 and 489
1983	Oshin	Jin Takura (adulthood)	NHK	Asadora
1984	School Wars	Kenji Takizawa	TBS	Lead role
1989	Red Beard		TBS	
1989	Kasuga no Tsubone	Inaba Masanari	NHK	Taiga drama
1996	Kindaichi Case Files	Tetsuo Tsuzuki	NTV	Season 2 Episode 4
2000	Aoi Tokugawa Sandai	Kuroda Nagamasa	NHK	Taiga drama
2003	Tramps Like Us	Minori Oishi	TBS	
2005	Fugo Keiji	Kumanari Kamakura	TV Asahi	
2005	Densha Otoko	Kengo Aoyama	Fuji TV	Episodes 8 and 9
2005	One Missed Call	Shuji Akino	TV Asahi	
2006	Saiyūki	Sekiun	Fuji TV	
2007	Sushi Ōji!	Kurage Okudaira	TV Asahi	
2007	Detective School Q	Kinzaburō Tōyama	NTV	Episode 7
2009	Tenchijin	Naoe Nobutsuna	NHK	Taiga drama
2009	Oishinbo	Rounded secretary general	Fuji TV	
2011	Kaitō Royale	Hideomi Todo	TBS	Episode 8
2013	Zyuden Sentai Kyoryuger	Dantetsu Kiryu / Kyoryu Silver	TV Asahi	
2015	Burning Flower	Kijima Matabei	NHK	Taiga drama

=== Films ===
Year	Title	Role	Notes	References
1987	Tokyo Blackout	Yosuke Tamiya		
2001	Waterboys			
2002	Ping Pong			
2014	Zyuden Sentai Kyoryuger vs. Go-Busters: The Great Dinosaur Battle! Farewell Our Eternal Friends	Dantetsu Kiryu		
2015	Ressha Sentai ToQger vs. Kyoryuger: The Movie	Kyoryu Silver (Voice)		
