= GoGo Sentai Boukenger vs. Super Sentai =

Japanese name
- Kanji: 轟轟戦隊ボウケンジャーVSスーパー戦隊
Transcriptions
- Revised Hepburn: Gōgō Sentai Bōkenjā Tai Sūpā Sentai
- Directed by: Katsuya Watanbe
- Written by: Akatsuki Yamatoya
- Based on: Himitsu Sentai Gorenger by Shotaro Ishinomori Super Sentai concept by Toei Company
- Produced by: Jun Hikasa; Masashi Yagi; Takaaki Utsunomiya; Kazuo Kato; Kōichi Yada
- Cinematography: Fumio Matsumura
- Music by: Chumei Watanabe; Kotaro Nakagawa
- Production companies: TV Asahi; Toei Company; Toei Agency
- Distributed by: Toei Company
- Release date: March 21, 2007
- Running time: 46 minutes
- Country: Japan
- Language: Japanese

GoGo Sentai Boukenger vs. Super Sentai (轟轟戦隊ボウケンジャーVSスーパー戦隊, Gōgō Sentai Bōkenjā Tai Sūpā Sentai) is a Japanese superhero crossover film between GoGo Sentai Boukenger and several previous Super Sentai Series, serving to commemorate the franchise's 30th anniversary. In the film, the Boukengers ally with their predecessors to defeat Time Demon Chronos.

== Plot ==
The movie starts with Time Demon Chronos meeting with High Priest Gajah on getting rid of the Boukengers while obtaining three Goodomu Engines. As they plot, a mysterious figure watches above them. Afterward, the Boukengers, excluding Bouken Silver, were summoned to battle some Curse. After their battle, they see Gajah and Chronos, with Chronos sending the Boukengers to a different dimension. Eiji was alerted of the situation, but before he could set out to rescue the other Boukengers, a mysterious figure named Aka Red, who describes himself as the embodiment of the fighting spirit of all Red Sentai Warriors, meets him and gives him the Super Sentai Address Book, which lists information on every Super Sentai member. He opens it to find Tsubasa Ozu, a.k.a. Magi Yellow from Mahō Sentai Magiranger.

Eiji tries to talk to Tsubasa during his boxing match but ends up getting ejected from the side of the ring since he was interfering with his match. Next, Tetsu, a.k.a. Deka Break from Tokusou Sentai Dekaranger, is undercover trying to negotiate with Alienizers when Eiji interrupts. Eiji tries to acknowledge Tetsu's background as Deka Break, but Tetsu beats him up and sends him out the window to maintain his cover. Elsewhere, at the Duel Bond site, Chronos shows a time device, a reverse flowing hourglass, to Gajah, which when augmented to a Goodomu Engine enables him to revive one of the Three Sorcerers, past Super Sentai villains whose magic caused the greatest harm to Earth. Chronos would set another up at the Matrix ruins with Gajah remaining to welcome the second Sorcerer while Chronos installed the final device in the countryside. In Chronos' time prison, the Boukengers find out they were blocked of their technology, and they meet up with Hikaru, a.k.a. Magi Shine, also from Mahō Sentai Magiranger.

Eiji then receives a call through his GoGo Changer from Asuka, a.k.a. Abare Black from Bakuryū Sentai Abaranger, all the way from Dino Earth while taking care of his daughter. He tells Eiji that Aka Red contacted him, but the connection to Earth is weak since the power of the dimension door is weak as well. Even contacting him was hard through the GoGo Changer. He loses connection to Eiji after a few minutes. While Chronos set up his time devices, Hikaru talks to the Boukengers about Chronos and the Boukengers are introduced to Smokey, although at first mistaking him as precious. Eiji then tries to meet Nanami Nono, a.k.a. Hurricane Blue from Ninpuu Sentai Hurricaneger, before her rehearsal, but is blocked by security and many fans. In a desperate attempt to catch Nanami's attention, Eiji shouts out "Hurricane Blue," which Nanami is surprised by.

Chronos was then successful in summoning Meemy, from Mahō Sentai Magiranger, who meets up with Chronos. In frustration, Eiji throws out the Super Sentai Address Book and decides to battle Meemy and Chronos on his own. After Eiji is overpowered, he was rescued by Hurricane Blue, Abare Black, Deka Break and Magi Yellow. However, the various Super Sentai warriors repeatedly get in each other's way and Meemy and Chronos were able to escape. In the time prison, Satoru reveals that he has Zubaan with him. TsueTsue from Hyakujuu Sentai Gaoranger was then revived and welcomed by Gajah.

At SGS, Eiji receives a message from Satoru concerning Chronos. The Super Sentai warriors then promised to help Eiji rescue the rest of the Boukengers and meet Aka Red while the time prison holding the Boukengers and Hikaru is slowly disappearing. Chronos and the other villains found the last hourglass tipped over, with the final Sorcerer missing, when they were attacked by the Super Sentai warriors. As the time prison started to disintegrate, Sakura analyzed and concluded that the clock with root-like designs in the wall was the key to their escape. The Boukengers and Hikaru then utilize the Magi Lamp Buster's Smoky Shining Attack, accompanied by Zubaan, on the clock in the wall. Although this does not damage the clock at all, it causes another root-like clock in the real world to appear. Aka Red orders the other warriors to destroy the clock while he takes care of the villains, transforming into Magi Red and Gao Red respectively, and frightening both Meemy and TsueTsue in the process; for both respective villains, Magi Red and Gao Red were their worst enemies. As Aka Red fights off the villains, the others succeed in freeing the Boukengers and Magi Shine from the alternate dimension.

The Super Sentai warriors and the villains face off, with the Sentai warriors getting the upper hand until Furabiijo from Ninpuu Sentai Hurricanger interferes after "taking a walk". But with all three Sorcerers present and accounted, Chronos fuses them all into the Staff of the Three Philosophers, his intended goal from the start. With the power of the staff, Chronos enabled himself to grow to gigantic proportions with new golden armor. The Boukengers countered with Ultimate DaiBouken and SirenBuilder, but Chronos proved too powerful for both the mecha and were defeated. In a last-ditch effort, the Boukengers summoned DaiVoyager, which was almost defeated by Chronos as well. Aka Red, sensing the danger, came back into the action, becoming a vessel to power up DaiVoyager using the Spirits given by the remaining Super Sentai warriors, enabling DaiVoyager to access its Burning Legend form. Burning Legend DaiVoyager went on to defeat Chronos with the special attack, 30 Super Sentai Soul (an energy attack powered by the Super Sentai warriors of the past), and sent the released sorcerers back into the afterlife. After their victory, the Boukengers and the other Super Sentai warriors return to the SGS headquarters, and then parted ways. The Boukengers, however, would not have time to relax, as they receive another call from Mr. Voice concerning another Negative Syndicate on the move. The movie ends with Aka Red watching over the Earth in outer space, going into a deep sleep until he is needed again.

== Cast ==
- Satoru Akashi (明石 暁, Akashi Satoru): Mitsuomi Takahashi (高橋 光臣, Takahashi Mitsuomi)
- Masumi Inou (伊能 真墨, Inō Masumi): Yasuka Saitoh (齋藤 ヤスカ, Saitō Yasuka)
- Souta Mogami (最上 蒼太, Mogami Sōta): Masashi Mikami (三上 真史, Mikami Masashi)
- Natsuki Mamiya (間宮 菜月, Mamiya Natsuki): Chise Nakamura (中村 知世, Nakamura Chise)
- Sakura Nishihori (西堀 さくら, Nishihori Sakura): Haruka Suenaga (末永 遥, Suenaga Haruka)
- Eiji Takaoka (高丘 映士, Takaoka Eiji): Masayuki Deai (出合 正幸, Deai Masayuki)
- Morio Makino (牧野森男, Makino Morio): Shigeru Saiki (斉木 しげる, Saiki Shigeru)
- Mister Voice (ミスター・ボイス, Misutā Boisu, Voice): Nobuo Tanaka (田中 信夫, Tanaka Nobuo)
- Great Sword Man Zubaan (大剣人ズバーン, Daikenjin Zubān, Voice): Hideyuki Hori (堀 秀行, Hori Hideyuki)
- Arch Priest Gajah (大神官ガジャ, Daishinkan Gaja): Hiroo Ohtaka (大高 洋夫, Ōtaka Hiroo)
- Nanami Nono (野乃 七海, Nono Nanam): Nao Nagasawa (長澤 奈央, Nagasawa Nao)
- Asuka (アスカ, Asuka): Kaoru Abe (阿部 薫, Kaoru Abe)
- Tekkan Aira (姶良 鉄幹, Aira Tekkan): Tomokazu Yoshida (吉田 友一, Yoshida Tomokazu)
- Tsubasa Ozu (小津 翼, Ozu Tsubasa): Hiroya Matsumoto (松本 寛也, Matsumoto Hiroya)
- Hikaru (ヒカル, Hikaru): Yousuke Ichikawa (市川 洋介, Ichikawa Yōsuke)
- Smoky the Magical Cat (魔法猫スモーキー, Mahō Neko Sumōkī, Voice): Takeshi Kusao (草尾 毅, Kusao Takeshi)
- Duchess Org TsueTsue (デュークオルグ ツエツエ, Dūku Orugu Tsuetsue): Rei Saito (斉藤 レイ, Saitō Rei)
- First Spear, Frabeejo (壱の槍・フラビージョ, Ichi no yari Furabījo): Azusa Yamamoto (山本 梓, Yamamoto Azusa)
- Sorcery Priest Meemy (魔導神官メーミィ, Madōshinkan Mēmī, Voice): Yasuhiro Takato (高戸 靖広, Takato Yasuhiro)

Guest cast

- Time Demon God Chronos (時の魔神クロノス, Toki no Majin Kuronosu, Voice): Bunkou Ogata (緒方文興, Ogata Bunkō)
- AkaRed (アカレッド, AkaReddo, Voice): Toru Furuya (古谷 徹, Furuya Tōru)

Suit actors

- Bouken Red: Hirofumi Fukuzawa (福沢 博文, Fukuzawa Hirofumi)
- Bouken Black: Yasuhiko Imai (今井 靖彦, Imai Yasuhiko)
- Bouken Blue, Smoky the Magical Cat, Extreme GoGo Gattai DaiVoyager: Yasuhiro Takeuchi (竹内 康博, Takeuchi Yasuhiro)
- Bouken Yellow, Sorcery Priest Meemy: Yūichi Hachisuka (蜂須賀 祐一, Hachisuka Yūichi)
- Bouken Pink: Motokuni Nakagawa (中川 素州, Nakagawa Motokuni)
- Bouken Silver, Kinkyu GoGo Gattai SirenBuilder: Hideaki Kusaka (日下 秀昭, Kusaka Hideaki)
- Great Sword Man Zubaan: Riichi Seike (清家 利一, Seike Riichi)
- AkaRed: Keizō Yabe (矢部 敬三, Yabe Keizō)
- Hurricane Blue: Yuuki Ono (小野 友紀, Ono Yūki)
- Abare Black: Yuya Nawata (縄田 雄哉, Nawata Yūya)
- Deka Break: Eitoku (永徳, Eitoku)
- Magi Yellow: Masaru Obayashi (大林 勝, Ōbayashi Masaru)
- Magi Shine, GoGo Gattai DaiBouken, Ultimate DaiBouken: Jirō Okamoto (岡元 次郎, Okamoto Jirō)
- Smoky the Magical Cat (sub): Naoko Kamio (神尾 直子, Kamio Naoko)
- Time Demon God Chronos

== Characters ==
=== New ===
==== Aka Red ====
Aka Red (アカレッド, Aka Reddo) is the Spirit of the Super Sentai's red warriors. He has all of the powers of all 30 red warriors, except Bouken Red. He leads the veteran Super Sentai warriors in the fight against Time Demon Chronos and his associates. Using his Soul Advent (ソウル降臨, Sōru Kōrin) ability, Aka Red transforms into two past red warriors; Hyakujuu Sentai Gaoranger's Gao Red and Mahō Sentai Magiranger's Magi Red. This power even recreates the transformation initiation gestures, the transformation sequence, roll call, and signature weapons and attacks. He also uses weapons from Ninpuu Sentai Hurricaneger's Hurricane Red, Bakuryū Sentai Abaranger's AbaRed, and Tokusou Sentai Dekaranger's Deka Red. During his roll call, he quickly transforms into the aforementioned five red warriors in chronological order (Gao Red, Hurricane Red, AbaRed, Deka Red, and Magi Red). Design-wise, he is based on the first red warrior, Himitsu Sentai Gorenger's Akarenger, and the thickness of his spandex recalls the cloth suits used from Gorenger to Dai Sentai Goggle-V. The logo of the 30th Anniversary is on his left chest, while his belt buckle is made up of the Roman numeral for the number 30 (XXX). He also possesses a fire motif, the common element of most red warriors, such as Gosei Sentai Dairanger's Ryu Ranger, Seijuu Sentai Gingaman's Ginga Red, Gao Red, Deka Red, Magi Red, and even Bouken Red himself. Before battle, he recites "The one who inherits the souls of the red warriors! Aka Red!"

- In episode 39 of the 32nd Super Sentai series Engine Sentai Go-Onger, Aka Red's helmet appears as one of the nine faces on the monster Yatai Banki's yatai, though the passive mask has no connection to the character from the Boukenger V-Cinema which premiered two years earlier; its appearance is merely trivial.
- Aka Red returns in the 35th anniversary series Kaizoku Sentai Gokaiger. In the series, his suit is redesigned with a 35 on his chest to represent the 35th anniversary of Super Sentai. It is revealed that he was the leader of the Red Pirates (赤き海賊団, Akaki Kaizokudan) - the largest rebel group to resist the Space Empire Zangyack. But when Basco Ta Jolokia betrayed the group and sided with the Zangyack Empire, Aka Red handed Captain Marvelous the Ranger Keys, making him promise to find the Greatest Treasure in the Universe before disappearing in battle. Aka Red also made an appearance in Gokaiger Goseiger Super Sentai 199 Hero Great Battle.

Aka Red is voiced by Tohru Furuya.

==== Chronos ====
Time Demon Chronos (時の魔神クロノス, Toki no Majin Kuronosu) is the V-Cinema's main antagonist. As his name suggests, he has the ability to control time, using a reverse flowing hourglass to revive past Super Sentai villains. He also imprisoned the Boukengers and Magi Shine in a time prison filled with cogs. Although he seems to fit into the theme of the enemies from Mahō Sentai Magiranger, he is based on Mirai Sentai Timeranger's Providus.

Chronos is voiced by Bunkō Ogata.

=== Past Super Sentai ===
==== Nanami Nono ====
Nanami Nono/Hurricane Blue (野乃 七海／ハリケンブルー, Nono Nanami/Hariken Burū) currently has a career as a singer. Eiji finds Nanami before her concert. To power up DaiVoyager, she gives Aka Red the Spirit of Friendship.

Nao Nagasawa reprises her role as Nanami Nono from Ninpuu Sentai Hurricaneger.

==== Asuka ====
Asuka/Abare Black (アスカ／アバレブラック, Asuka/Abare Burakku) currently lives on Dino Earth where he is into his third year of marriage and family life. He calls Eiji through the Dino Commander while simultaneously doing laundry and minding his newest child. Instead of wearing his armor like he did when he briefly returned to Another Earth in Dekaranger vs. Abaranger, he wears his Dino House jacket. To power up DaiVoyager, he gives Aka Red the Spirit of Passion.

Kaoru Abe reprises his role as Asuka from Bakuryū Sentai Abaranger.

==== Tekkan Aira ====
Tekkan Aira/Deka Break (姶良 鉄幹／デカブレイク, Tetsu/Deka Bureiku), nicknamed "Tetsu" (テツ), is still a member of the SPD Earth Branch, working undercover when Eiji first met him but was forced to throw Eiji out to prevent his cover from being blown, though he later apologizes for it. To power up DaiVoyager, he gives Aka Red the Spirit of Justice.

Tomokazu Yoshida reprises his role as Tekkan Aira from Tokusou Sentai Dekaranger.

==== Tsubasa Ozu ====
Tsubasa Ozu/Magi Yellow (小津 翼／マジイエロー, Ozu Tsubasa/Maji Ierō) is now a professional boxer, fighting for the bantamweight championship when Eiji found him. To power up DaiVoyager, he gives Aka Red the Spirit of Courage.

Hiroya Matsumoto reprises his role as Tsubasa Ozu from Mahō Sentai Magiranger.

==== Hikaru ====
Hikaru/Magi Shine (ヒカル／マジシャイン, Hikaru/Maji Shain) is married to Tsubasa's sister Urara, making them brothers-in-law, and was a prisoner of Chronos alongside the Boukengers. To power up DaiVoyager, he gave Aka Red the Spirit of Love.

Yousuke Ichikawa reprises his role as Hikaru from Mahō Sentai Magiranger.

=== Allies ===
- Smoky the Magical Cat (魔法猫スモーキー, Mahō Neko Sumōkī): An ally from Mahō Sentai Magiranger. A magical cat genie found by Hikaru, he helps the Boukengers by executing a combination attack with Zubaan.

=== Cameos and references to past series ===
- Bakuryū Brachiosaurus (爆竜ブラキオサウルス, Bakuryū Burakiosaurusu): Asuka's Bakuryū partner. He mostly functions as the carrier for the rest of the Bakuryū except Abare Killer's and Abare Max's and is the largest and wisest (and probably oldest) of them. Makes a non-speaking cameo on Dino Earth while Asuka is contacting Eiji while doing laundry.
- Mahoro (マホロ): Asuka's wife. Initially introduced as Destruction Messenger Jeanne of the Evolien's Dark Sect, lately known as Mahoro, the Abarangers discover her true identity and aid in her restoration. Asuka looks at a picture of her in his locket while communicating with Eiji from Dino Earth.
- Duke Org Yabaiba (デュークオルグ ヤバイバ, Dūku Orugu Yabaiba): A crazed pierrot-like Duke Org with a mastery of blades and TsueTsue's partner-in-crime, who was killed alongside her in Hurricaneger vs. Gaoranger. Upon TsueTsue's revival, she calls for Yabaiba, looking for him, before noticing Gajah.

== Songs ==
Opening theme

- "GoGo Sentai Boukenger" (轟轟戦隊ボウケンジャー, Gōgō Sentai Bōkenjā)
  - Lyrics: Yūho Iwasato
  - Composition: Nobuo Yamada
  - Arrangement: Seiichi Kyōda
  - Artist: NoB

Ending theme

- "Densetsu" (伝説; "Legends")
  - Lyrics: Show Aikawa
  - Composition & Arrangement: Michiaki Watanabe
  - Artist: Akira Kushida, Takayuki Miyauchi, & MoJo

== See also ==
- Once a Ranger - The Power Rangers Operation Overdrive version of this film.
- 2000 Today, New Year's worldwide New Millennium broadcast from all around the world.
  - Zvi Dor-Ner
- Who's Crying Now?, The Power Rangers Megaforce similar counterpart-version of this movie.
