= Japão Brasil Network Television =

Brazilian television channel (2008–2009)

Japão Brasil Network Television was a Brazilian television channel catering the Japanese diaspora and people of Japanese descent living in Brazil, from 2008 to 2009.

It started broadcasts on June 18, 2008, during the hundredth anniversary of Japanese immigration to Brazil. Its schedule was equally divided between local productions made for the Japanese diaspora and programs imported from Japan, which were shown dubbed or subtitled. Original programming at launch included Momento Zen, the children's program Jankempo and cultural programs.

Its technical director at launch was Yuguio Miasiro, who had left Record in early June 2008, who planned JBN TV since October 2007 and began producing programs in early 2008, eyeing the future launch. It was available on Sky Brasil channel 150. The channel ran from 7am to midnight with the overnight hours being likely used for advertisers.

Up until its launch, the only Japanese channel available on subscription television was NHK World Premium. JBN TV, however, was available on all packages.

The channel started revealing programming data in July. Due to its quick premiere, the channel was unable to air subtitled content, leading to delays. The first Japanese programs revealed were a package of TV Asahi dramas: Saotome Typhoon, OL Zenido, Hyoten, Denchi ga Kireru Made and Chakushin Ari. Its partners were TV Asahi, Fuji Television, Toei Company, PR-Shoji and Fuji TV affiliate Okinawa Television. The subtitled package of dramas arrived on September 15, which also included a sixth TV Asahi drama, Team Astro.

On December 15, 2008, the channel premiered Saberes dos Sabores, produced in association with the Japan Foundation.

On February 1, 2009, the channel launched an online subscription service, JBN-Web, while the linear television channel at the time was known for constant repetitions and low image quality. In March, deputee Hélio Nishimoto visited JBN TV's facilities and encountered director Roberto Uno.

Sky removed JBN TV without prior warning on August 31, 2009, with a banner appearing on channel 142 (where it had been relocated). The channel's public relations team did not disclose the exact reasons, but ANMTV reported that the shutdown was due to internal problems the company was facing, with many suggesting that its operations were to close definitively.
