= Ayumi Beppu =

Japanese actress

- Born: Sakai, Osaka, Japan
- Years active: 2002-present

Ayumi Beppu (別府 あゆみ, Beppu Ayumi) is a Japanese actress and tarento from Sakai, Osaka Prefecture. She is chiefly known for her role as Houka Ozu/Magi Pink (小津 芳香／マジピンク, Ozu Hōka/Maji Pinku) in Mahou Sentai Magiranger.

== Filmography ==
- Mahou Sentai Magiranger - Houka Ozu/Magi Pink (2005)
- Mahou Sentai Magiranger The Movie: Bride of Infershia - Houka Ozu/Magi Pink (2005)
- Mahou Sentai Magiranger vs. Dekaranger - Houka Ozu/Magi Pink (2006)
- Cho Ninja Tai Inazuma! - Woman Space Sheriff Beppy (2006)
- Cho Ninja Tai Inazuma!! SPARK - Hayabusa, Beppy/Ayumiko Kitabeppu (2007)
- Kaizoku Sentai Gokaiger - Houka Ozu/Magi Pink (2012)
- Rurouni Kenshin: Kyoto Inferno - Omime (2014)
- Rurouni Kenshin: The Legend Ends - Omime (2014)
- Hero Mama League - Houka Ozu/Magi Pink (2018)
