= Fugo Keiji =

- 富豪刑事
- Genre: Mystery
- Based on: The Millionaire Detective by Yasutaka Tsutsui
- Written by: Mitsuharu Makita; Takuro Fukuda
- Directed by: Toshikazu Nagae; Jota Tsunehiro; Yuichi Abe
- Starring: Kyoko Fukada; Kazuma Suzuki; Ryuji Sainei; Shinji Yamashita
- Music by: Yo Tsuji
- Opening theme: "Ai no Memori" by Mitsuhiro Oikawa
- Country of origin: Japan
- Original language: Japanese
- No. of episodes: 10

Production
- Producers: Kiyoshi Kuwata (TV Asahi); Mitsuharu Makita; Yoshihiro Fukazawa (Toho)
- Production companies: TV Asahi; Toho

Original release
- Network: ANN (TV Asahi)
- Release: January 13 – March 17, 2005

Related
- Fugo Keiji 2

Fugō Keiji (富豪刑事; The Millionaire Detective) is a 2005 Japanese drama broadcast by TV Asahi based on a novel of the same name by Yasutaka Tsutsui.

== Synopsis ==
Miwako Kambe, the granddaughter of a millionaire, becomes a detective and starts working at a police station where there are few women. Her style, elegant manners, and upper-class attitudes constantly get on the nerves of her old-fashioned co-workers. However, Miwako’s investigations solve many cases.

== Cast ==
- Kyoko Fukada as Miwako Kambe (Makoto Takasaka as her child)
- Kazuma Suzuki as Tetsuya Saruwatari
- Ryuji Sainei as Seiichi Nishijima
- Shinji Yamashita as Kumanari Kamakura
- Takeshi Masu as Yoshikazu Tsuruoka
- Kazuyuki Aijima as Torahiko Kouzuka
- Susumu Terajima as Koushirou Nunobiki
- Tokuma Nishioka as Ikuzo Kamiyama
- Isao Natsuyagi as Kikuemon Kanbe
- Yoshie Ichige as Matsue Suzuki
- Yasutaka Tsutsui as Ryuhei Sezaki
- Anna Nose as Sezaki's secretary
- Maho Nonami as Junko Higuchi
- Megumi Nakayama as Hiromi
- Shigeru Matsuzaki
- Youichi Nukumizu (cameo)
- Mitsuhiro Oikawa (ep10)
- Yuki Matsumura

== Episodes ==
- Ep 01: (「富豪刑事の囮」)
- Ep 02: (「美術館の富豪刑事」)
- Ep 03: (「密室の富豪刑事」)
- Ep 04: (「富豪刑事のキッドナップ」)
- Ep 05: (「ホテルの富豪刑事」)
- Ep 06: (「富豪刑事の遺体捜索」)
- Ep 07: (「富豪刑事の古美術品騒動」)
- Ep 08: (「富豪刑事の要人警護」)
- Ep 09: (「学園の富豪刑事」)
- Ep 10: (「絶体絶命の富豪刑事」)

=== Ratings ===
- Ep 01: 16.2%
- Ep 02: 11.1%
- Ep 03: 12.6%
- Ep 04: 12.6%
- Ep 05: 13.2%
- Ep 06: 11.6%
- Ep 07: 10.6%
- Ep 08: 12.3%
- Ep 09: 11.7%
- Ep 10: 12.3%
