= Asami Kai =

Japanese actress and gravure idol

- Born: January 9, 1987 (age 39); Kumamoto, Japan
- Years active: 2005-2009
- Height: 163 cm (5 ft 4 in)

Asami Kai (甲斐 麻美/かい あさみ) (born January 9, 1987) is a Japanese actress and gravure idol. She is best known for her role as Maji Blue in the television series Mahō Sentai Magiranger. She is originally from Kumamoto.

== Television ==
- Mahou Sentai Magiranger (2005, TV Asahi) - Urara Ozu/MagiBlue
- Gakincho - Return Kids - (2006, TBS-TV)
- Joshi Ana Icchokusen! (2007, TV Tokyo)

== Films ==
- Mahou Sentai Magiranger, the Movie "The Bride of Infersia" (2005, Toei) – Urara Ozu/MagiBlue
- Chō Ninja Tai Inazuma! (2006, Toei) – Kaguya/Shiden
- Magiranger VS Dekaranger (2006, Toei) – Urara Ozu/MagiBlue
