= Hiroya Matsumoto =

Japanese actor

- 松本 寛也
- Born: June 21, 1986 (age 38); Akita, Akita Prefecture, Japan
- Occupation: Actor
- Years active: 2005–present
- Height: 174 cm (5 ft 9 in)
- Website: https://hiroya.officialsite.co/

Hiroya Matsumoto (松本 寛也, Matsumoto Hiroya, born June 21, 1986) is a Japanese actor. He is known for his portrayal of Tsubasa Ozu/Magi Yellow in Mahou Sentai Magiranger, and later, Masato Jin/Beet Buster in Tokumei Sentai Go-Busters. He is currently serving as the Super Sentai Goodwill Ambassador since 2017.

== Filmography ==
- Mahou Sentai Magiranger - Magi Yellow/Tsubasa Ozu (2005-2006)
- Mahou Sentai Magiranger the Movie: Bride of Infershia - Magi Yellow/Tsubasa Ozu (2005)
- Mahou Sentai Magiranger VS Dekaranger - Magi Yellow/Tsubasa Ozu (2006)
- Chō Ninja Tai Inazuma! - Senden/Kankichi (2006)
- Boys Love - Chidori Furumura (2006)
- GoGo Sentai Boukenger vs. Super Sentai - Magi Yellow/Tsubasa Ozu (2007)
- Musical Air Gear - Juliet (2007)
- Chō Ninja Tai Inazuma!! Spark - Senden/Kankichi (2007)
- Biyou Shounen★Celebrity - Rui (2007)
- Tokumei Sentai Go-Busters - Beet Buster / Masato Jin (2012-2013)
- Tokumei Sentai Go-Busters the Movie: Protect the Tokyo Enetower! - Masato Jin/ Beet Buster (2012)
- Tokumei Sentai Go-Busters vs. Kaizoku Sentai Gokaiger: The Movie - Masato Jin / Beet Buster (2013)
- Zyuden Sentai Kyoryuger vs. Go-Busters: The Great Dinosaur Battle! Farewell Our Eternal Friends - Masato Jin / Beet Buster (2014)
- Shuriken Sentai Ninninger - Tsubasa Ozu/Magi Yellow (2015) - cameo episodes 38
- Uchu Sentai Kyuranger - Minato Hoshi (2017)
- Kamen Rider × Super Sentai: Ultra Super Hero Taisen - Masato Jin / Beet Buster (2017)
- Hero Mama League - Tsubasa Ozu (2018)
- Lupinranger VS Patranger VS Kyuranger - Minato Hoshi (2019)
- Mashin Sentai Kiramager - Ice pop seller (2020) -cameo episodes 35
- Shikkokuten (2022)
