= Azusa Watanabe =

Japanese actress (born 1969)

- 渡辺 梓
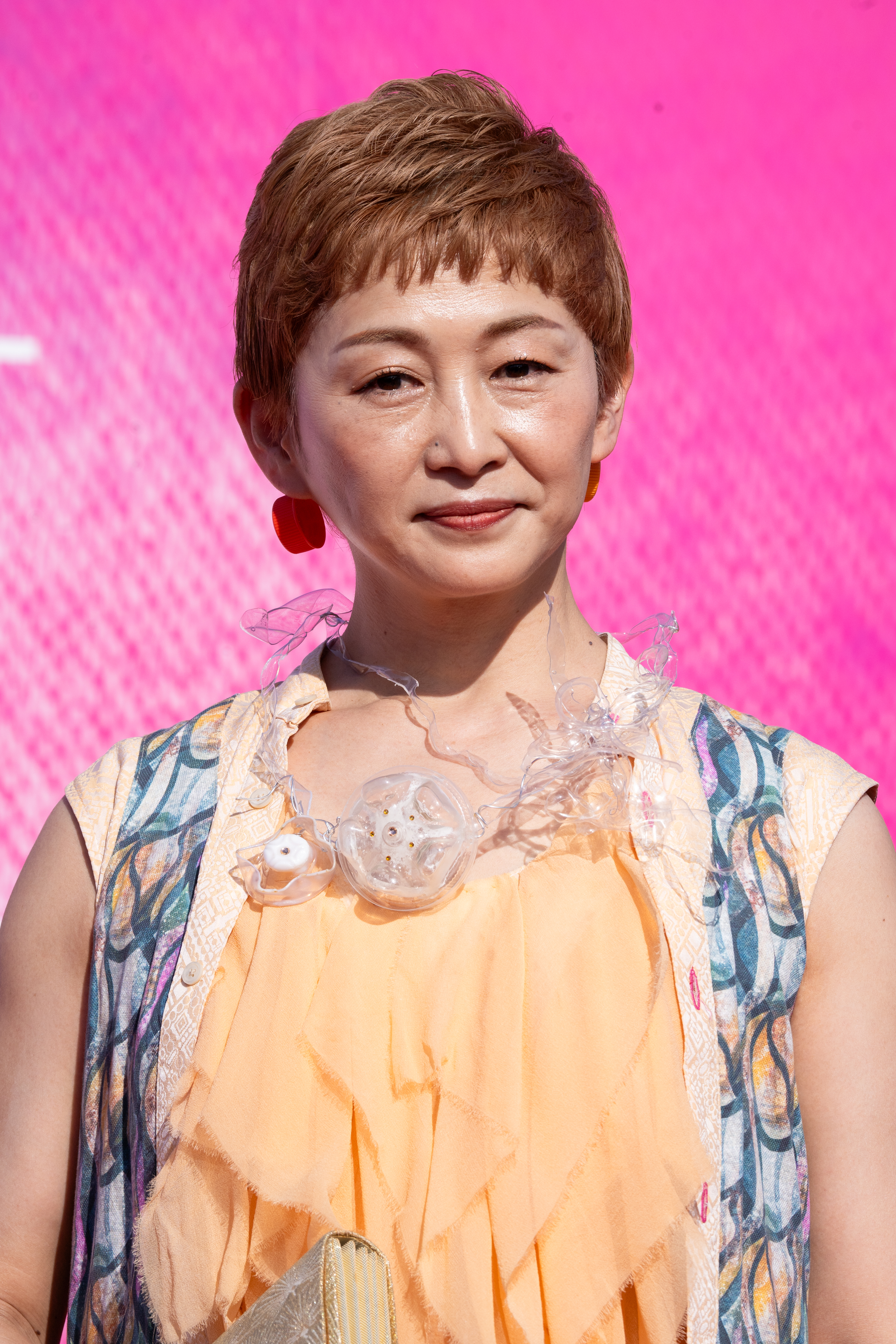
- Watanabe in 2024
- Born: February 20, 1969 (age 56); Fujinomiya, Shizuoka Prefecture, Japan
- Occupation: Actress
- Years active: 1989 - present
- Spouse: Minoru Inayoshi (m. 1994)
- Children: 2

Azusa Watanabe (渡辺 梓, Watanabe Azusa; born February 20, 1969, in Fujinomiya, Shizuoka Prefecture, Japan) is a Japanese actress who is affiliated with both Toei Management and Mumeijuku. She starred in the 43rd NHK Asadora Wakko no Kin Medaru (1989–1990), which earned an average rating of 33.8%.

== Filmography ==
=== TV series ===
Year	Title	Role	Other notes	Ref.
1989–90	Wakko's Gold Medal	Kazuko "Wakko" Akizu	Lead role; Asadora	

=== Films ===
Year	Title	Role	Other notes	Ref.
2022	Ware Yowakereba: Yajima Kajiko-den			
2024	My Mom, My Angel: A Journey of Love and Acceptance			
