= Mahō Sentai Magiranger =

Television series

- Genre: Tokusatsu; Superhero fiction; Fantasy fiction; Supernatural; Horror fiction; Psychological drama; Comedy
- Created by: Saburo Yatsude
- Written by: Atsushi Maekawa (head)
- Directed by: Katsuya Watanabe
- Starring: Atsushi Hashimoto; Hiroya Matsumoto; Asami Kai; Ayumi Beppu; Yūki Itō; Azusa Watanabe; Yousuke Ichikawa; Tsutomu Isobe; Chiaki Horan; Tomomi Kitagami
- Voices of: Kumiko Higa; Takeshi Kusao
- Narrated by: Tesshō Genda
- Composer: Kousuke Yamashita
- Country of origin: Japan
- No. of episodes: 49 (list of episodes)

Production
- Executive producer: Takeyuki Suzuki
- Producers: Schreck Hedwick; Hideaki Tsukada; Takaaki Utsunomiya; Kōichi Yada
- Production locations: Tokyo, Japan (Greater Tokyo Area)
- Running time: 30 minutes
- Production companies: TV Asahi; Toei Company; Toei Advertising

Original release
- Network: ANN (TV Asahi)
- Release: February 13, 2005 – February 12, 2006

Related
- Tokusou Sentai Dekaranger; GoGo Sentai Boukenger

Mahō Sentai Magiranger (魔法戦隊マジレンジャー, Mahō Sentai Majirenjā; Magical Squadron Magiranger) is a Japanese Tokusatsu television show and Toei Company's 29th production of the Super Sentai metaseries. It aired from February 13, 2005, to February 12, 2006, replacing Tokusou Sentai Dekaranger and was replaced by GoGo Sentai Boukenger. The action footage was used in Power Rangers Mystic Force and both shows had scenes simultaneously shot in New Zealand. The main themes of this series are courage and love of family. This series was dubbed into Korean under the title Power Rangers Magic Force. It aired as part of TV Asahi's Super Hero Time alongside Kamen Rider Hibiki. This was the last installment to be produced and broadcast in the 4:3 aspect ratio.

== Synopsis ==
A war between the Infershia and Magitopia had occurred unbeknownst to humans. After being imprisoned within the Earth for fifteen years, the Infershia have returned to get revenge from their imprisonment. When the Infershia attack, five siblings witness their mother change in front of them and she hands them Magi Phones to transform into a magic team. Now endowed with magic powers, these five vow to live up to their family's legacy. They have yet to discover many more family secrets.

== Characters ==
=== Magirangers ===
The five siblings of the Ozu family (小津家, Ozu-ke), which consist of three brothers and two sisters, are mages who lived peacefully with their mother under the assumption that their father died on an expedition in Antarctica. However, the siblings learn their family legacy as they battle against the Infershia after their mother was taken from them. They are later joined by their father's apprentice and eventually their parents.

Each primary member carries a Magi Phone (マージフォン, Māji Fon), which allows them to cast spells, as their transformation device along with a Magi Stick (マジスティック, Māji Sutikku) wand, which can be reconfigured into varying forms, as their sidearm. They also ride broom-like Sky Hoki (スカイホーキー, Sukai Hōkī) flying vehicles for transportation and can summon a pair of Magi Punch (マジパンチ, Maji Panchi) gauntlets.

Later in the series, the primary Magirangers gain the ability to assume Legend Mode (レジェンドモード, Rejendo Mōdo) where they wield Dial Rod (ダイヤルロッド, Daiyaru Roddo) staffs, which allow them to perform either standalone Magi Bolt (マジボルト, Maji Boruto) attacks or the combined Legend Finish (レジェンドフィニッシュ, Rejendo Finisshu) finisher.

Kai Ozu (小津 魁, Ozu Kai)
The youngest child of the Ozu family who is the team leader despite being in high school, impulsive yet optimistic and brave. He is able to become Magi Red (マジレッド, Maji Reddo), with a proficiency in alchemy and fire magic. Kai bore animosity towards Wolzard for most of the series for seemingly killing Miyuki before learning his true identity as Isamu, gradually accepting him while inheriting his techniques and ideals.

As the "Red Magician" (赤の魔法使い, Aka no Mahōtsukai), Magi Red, Kai derives his powers from Flagel. He also primarily wields the Magi Stick in its Magi Stick Sword (マジスティックソード, Māji Sutikku Sōdo) mode. His signature attack is the Red Fire (レッドファイヤー, Reddo Faiyā).

Tsubasa Ozu (小津 翼, Ozu Tsubasa)
The second youngest child and middle son of the Ozu family, the rational second in command despite being laid-back and irresponsible at times. He is able to become Magi Yellow (マジイエロー, Maji Ierō), with a proficiency in potion-making and thunder magic.

As the "Yellow Magician" (黄色の魔法使い, Kiiro no Mahōtsukai), Magi Yellow, Tsubasa derives his powers from Volgel. He also primarily wields the Magi Stick in its Magi Stick Bowgun (マジスティックボウガン, Māji Sutikku Bōgan) mode. His signature attack is the Yellow Thunder (イエローサンダー, Ierō Sandā).

Urara Ozu (小津 麗, Ozu Urara)
The middle child and youngest daughter of the Ozu family, a kind-hearted yet strict girl who acts like a surrogate mother to her siblings. She is able to become Magi Blue (マジブルー, Maji Burū), with a proficiency in fortune-telling and water magic. Overtime, while being mentored by Hikaru, Urara began to develop feelings for him and eventually married him prior to the series finale.

As the "Blue Magician" (青の魔法使い, Ao no Mahōtsukai), Magi Blue, Urara derives her powers from Splagel. Her signature attack is the Blue Splash (ブルースプラッシュ, Burū Supurasshu).

Houka Ozu (小津 芳香, Ozu Hōka)
The second oldest child and eldest daughter of the Ozu family, a somewhat ditzy girl who looks on the bright side of things while sometimes working as a fashion model. She is able to become Magi Pink (マジピンク, Maji Pinku), with a proficiency in transformations and wind magic.

As the "Pink Magician" (桃色の魔法使い, Momoiro no Mahōtsukai), Magi Pink, Houka derives her powers from Wingel. Her signature attack is the Pink Storm (ピンクストーム, Pinku Sutōmu).

Makito Ozu (小津 蒔人, Ozu Makito)
The oldest child of the Ozu family who acts like a surrogate father to his siblings and grows vegetables on his personal "Big Brother Farm". He is able to become Magi Green (マジグリーン, Maji Gurīn), with a proficiency in herbology and earth magic. Despite appearing to be overbearing, he is truly the linchpin that keeps his family together.

As the "Green Magician" (緑の魔法使い, Midori no Mahōtsukai), Magi Green, Makito derives his powers from Groungel. He also primarily wields the Magi Stick in its Magi Stick Axe (マジスティックアックス, Māji Sutikku Akkusu) mode. His signature attack is the Green Ground (グリーングランド, Gurīn Gurando).

Hikaru (ヒカル)
An apprentice of Isamu's whose true identity is the solarkinetic Heavenly Saint Sungel (天空聖者サンジェル, Tenkū Seija Sanjeru), having fought Infershia in the past before he was turned into a frog as a side effect of sealing Raigel until Urara kissed him to break the spell. Assuming his human identity, Hikaru transforms into the gold-colored Magi Shine (マジシャイン, Maji Shain), resolving to serve the Ozu siblings as their mentor in magic while settling things with Memmy. Overtime, while mentoring the Ozu siblings, Hikaru began to develop feelings for Urara and eventually married her prior to the series finale.

As the "Heavenly Hero" (天空勇者, Tenkū Yūsha), Magi Shine, Hikaru utilizes Magi Tickets (マージチケット, Māji Chiketto) in conjunction with the Grip Phone (グリップフォン, Gurippu Fon) ticket punch to transform and cast spells. He also wields the Magi Lamp Buster (マジランプバスター, Maji Ranpu Basutā) handgun, which allows him to perform the Smoky Shining Attack (スモーキーシャイニングアタック, Sumōkī Shainingu Atakku) finisher alongside Smoky, and rides the Skarpet (スカーペット, Sukāpetto) flying carpet.

Miyuki Ozu (小津 深雪, Ozu Miyuki)
The Ozu siblings' mother who can transform into the white-colored Magi Mother (マジマザー, Maji Mazā), with a proficiency in ice magic. Following Isamu's disappearance and convincing Magiel to grant her children magic as a precaution, Miyuki concealed the truth of her and her husband fighting Infershia from their children until its forces resume their attack on the surface. Though it appeared Wolzard killed her, which motivated her children to fight Infershia, he momentarily regained his memory as Isamu long enough to teleport Miyuki away into the Flower Garden of Souls as light, only to be taken captive by Toad until her children rescued her.

As the "White Magician" (白の魔法使い, Shiro no Mahōtsukai), Magi Mother, Miyuki utilizes a variant of the Magi Phone called the Silver Magi Phone (シルバーマージフォン, Shirubā Māji Fon) to transform where she derives her powers from Snowgel. She also wields an elongated version of the Magi Stick.

Isamu Ozu (小津 勇, Ozu Isamu)
The Ozu siblings' father and Magitopia's champion, the pyrokinetic Heavenly Saint Blagel (天空聖者ブレイジェル, Tenkū Seija Bureijeru), who was forced to leave his family to seal the Hades Gate with him trapped in Infershia where he is transformed into the violet-colored Wolzard (ウルザード, Uruzādo), gaining a proficiency in dark magic. He battled the Magirangers until he regained his memories and sacrificed himself to seal N Ma inside his body, hiding himself away until he was attacked and nearly killed by Dagon, only to be healed by Miyuki. After absorbing Wyvern's flames, Isamu gains the ability to transform into the crimson-colored Wolzard Fire (ウルザードファイヤー, Uruzādo Faiyā).

As the "Dark Magic Knight" (魔導騎士, Madō Kishi), Wolzard, Isamu utilized a dark copy of the Magi Phone called the Wolza Phone (ウーザフォン, Ūza Fon) to transform where he derived his powers from Infershia. Upon being freed from his brainwashing, the Wolza Phone is purified into the Fire Wolza Phone (ファイヤーウーザフォン, Faiyā Ūza Fon), allowing him to transform into the "Heavenly Hero", Wolzard Fire. He also wields the Wol Saber (ウルサーベル, Uru Sāberu) and the Jagun Shield (ジャガンシールド, Jagan Shīrudo) in both forms.

=== Allies ===
Mandora Boy (マンドラ坊や, Mandora-bōya)
A young mandrake the Magirangers met when they found their secret headquarters. Despite being in a pot, he can hop around as well as fly. He can even be plucked out of the pot, which, true to his species, will cause him to emit a deafening cry, though the experience comes to him as painful (as seen in Stage 3, when Tsubasa, with headphones on, did so). Mandora Boy will often give advice to the team, particularly Kai, and introduced their individual abilities to them. He is very emotional and easily excited and tends to bicker with Smoky after he and Hikaru moved in.
Smoky the Magical Cat (魔法猫スモーキー, Mahō Neko Sumōkī)
Hikaru's mischievous feline-themed genie who resides in the Magi Lamp (マジランプ, Maji Ranpu), which was found in the cave that was Raigel's tomb. Smoky came into being from the volcano in Flagel's domain on Magitopia, causing trouble for the Magitopians with his pranks until he was inflicted with a curse from opening the Annihilation Box. Sungel saved Smoky by placing him in the Magi Lamp, but the cat is informed that he cannot last more than three hours outside the lamp. Smoky can be released from the curse if he grants the wishes of others, but Smoky prefers to grant only one wish to whoever awakens him from his slumber, and only if he is compensated for his services. When the Ozu siblings wished for Infershia to be gone, he denied their request, stating that the power the Infershia wield is greater than his own. He seems to have some limited magical powers as well, such as getting brief glimpses of the future and enlarging himself to help the gang out and by turning food into sand as a prank. Despite being a goof-off, he is a capable fighter and once piloted Travelion (though he usually just shovels the coal). He sees Urara as a mother figure and bickers with Mandora Boy now and then.
Yuka Yamazaki (山崎 由佳, Yamazaki Yuka)
The manager of Kai's high school soccer team whom he developed a crush on despite her falling in love with Magi Red. She eventually learns of Kai's identity as Magi Red when she was abducted by Glúm do Bridon to be his bride during the events of Bride of Infershia, but kept it a secret as she supports him from afar.

==== Heavenly Saints ====
Heavenly Saints (天空聖者, Tenkū Seija)

Heavenly Saint Flagel (天空聖者フレイジェル, Tenkū Seija Fureijeru)
A pyrokinetic Heavenly Saint and the source of Magi Red's powers.
Heavenly Saint Volgel (天空聖者ボルジェル, Tenkū Seija Borujeru)
An electrokinetic Heavenly Saint and the source of Magi Yellow's powers.
Heavenly Saint Splagel (天空聖者スプラジェル, Tenkū Seija Supurajeru)
A hydrokinetic Heavenly Saint and the source of Magi Blue's powers.
Heavenly Saint Wingel (天空聖者ウインジェル, Tenkū Seija Uinjeru)
An aerokinetic Heavenly Saint and the source of Magi Pink's powers.
Heavenly Saint Groungel (天空聖者グランジェル, Tenkū Seija Guranjeru)
A geokinetic Heavenly Saint and the source of Magi Green's powers.
Heavenly Saint Lunagel (天空聖者ルナジェル, Tenkū Seija Runajeru)
A lunakinetic Heavenly Saint and an ally of Blagel who acted on his orders to seal Hades Gate with "key magic", keeping it close while she lives. She loses her memory after being attacked by Raigel, wandering in a human form Kai later named Rin (リン) before she regained her memories. Despite her initial thoughts on the Magirangers, she reconsiders after Kai saves her as she returns to Magitopia while helping the Ozu siblings in any way she can.
Heavenly Saint Snowgel (天空聖者スノウジェル, Tenkū Seija Sunōjeru)
A cryokinetic Heavenly Saint, the source of Magi Mother's powers, and a former apprentice of the Five Legendary Magicians who is able to unleash one's dormant magic within a person and assume an infant-like guise. After the tragedy of Miyuki and Blagel along with Raigel's treachery, Snowgel took refuge in the Marudeyona World called the "Lamentation Sea" formed from her tears. The Magirangers manage to find Snowgel and convince her to aid them in acquiring the Legend powers. Snowgel later appears to aid in the Magirangers' battle against Drake, revealing her true adult form while teaching Hikaru an important lesson.
Heavenly Arch Saint Magiel (天空大聖者マジエル, Tenkū Daiseija Majieru)
The giant-sized leader of the Heavenly Saints who resides in Heavenly Temple, the highest point in Magitopia. At first, Magiel refused to let the Ozu siblings borrow Unigolon due to the fact that Magitopian law dictates that Heavenly Saints are not allowed to intervene in human affairs. She even admitted that she frowned on both Blagel's choice to sacrifice himself and Miyuki's intent to learn magic. But after seeing the same courage their parents showed, Magiel allowed them Unigolon's aid and made a later exception on the distribution of the Five Legendary Magicians' power to the Ozu siblings. When N Ma attacks Magitopia, after failing to stop him, Magiel teleports Lunagel to the human world before she is seemingly killed by the demon's rampage. However, she teleported herself to the Flower Garden of Souls at the last second and remained there during the final battle. A year after N Ma's destruction, Magiel is still getting used to Urara living on the rebuilt Magitopia.

=== Underground Hades Empire Infershia ===
The Underground Hades Empire Infershia (地底冥府インフェルシア, Chitei Meifu Inferushia) is an underground empire ruled by the mysterious N Ma. Fifteen years ago, N Ma created the Hades Gate to send his entire army to Earth, but was stopped by Blagel. He uses his agents to break the seal so he can conquer the surface world. Overtime, however, some of the Infershians began to realize N Ma's insane obsession with destroying Magitopia and the Ozu family was reckless due to needless deaths. Once N Ma was destroyed, Hades Goddess Sphinx took over the Infershia to rebuild their world and start anew with Magitopia.

Hades Beast Emperor N Ma (冥獣帝ン・マ, Meijūtei N Ma)
The Cthulhu-themed ruler of Infershia who is a demon of pure evil motivated by sheer malice and an uncontrollable hunger to devour everything in sight. His original form is a giant-sized octopus with dragon-headed tentacles. For the first half of the series, N Ma contacted his minions via a white pool at the center of their lair before a purified Blagel sealed the demon's soul in his own body until the Hades Gods extract him using Titan as a sacrifice and mold the god's body in his image. Three days after acquiring his new form, Absolute God N Ma (絶対神ン・マ, Zettaishin N Ma), N Ma attacks Magitopia while revealing his ability to absorb all magic. The Magirangers ultimately use this ability against him by causing him to explode from being unable to contain their unlimited magic.
Victory General Branken (凱力大将ブランケン, Gairiki Taishō Buranken)
A Frankenstein's monster-themed high commander who was previously a High Zobile, armed with the Imperial Sword Hell Fang created from N Ma's fang that he uses in his "Hell Slash" attack. Branken desires to reach the surface world and clashed with Wolzard over it, using the Hades Beasts to systematic slaughter people in hopes one among would be Lungel with her death removing the seal on the Hades Gate. Once Lunagel was found and captured, Branken forced himself through the partially unseal Hades Gate before he is destroyed by Magi King with Wolzard taking his Hell Fang to forge into a replacement sword.
Sorcery Priest Meemy (魔導神官メーミィ, Madō Shinkan Mēmyi)
A mummy-themed high commander who took over following Branken, armed with an extendable fan. He was originally the electrokinetic Heavenly Saint Raigel (天空聖者ライジェル, Tenkū Seija Raijeru), Blagel's apprentice who believed magic is a means to grant his own selfish desires. He betrayed his comrades during their battle with Infershia, abandoning Blagel and sealing Lunagel's memories before confronted by Sungel in a battle that ended with them sealed in a cave with Raigel's mummified remains covered by Vanculia. Meemy, seeing himself as N Ma's vassel, uses the Hades Beastmen in schemes to bring N Ma into the human world before succeeding with the Magirangers' Legend powers. He is ultimately killed after engaging in a Duel Bond match with Hikaru, crumbling to dust while revealing the advent of the Infershia Pantheon.
Phantom Spy Vanculia (妖幻密使バンキュリア, Yōgen Misshi Bankyuria)
A vampire queen who serves as Infershia's spy, is unaffected by sunlight and virtually indestructible. She acquired the ability to travel freely between the surface and Infershia when she developed the ability to split herself into two bodies to overcome her lonely existence. The two fragmented halves, Nai & Mea (ナイとメア, Nai to Mea), are mischievous in personality with Nai appearing as the 'older sister' since Mea repeats some of her words. Eventually, Vanculia joins Sphinx in siding with the Magirangers to stop N Ma.
Hades Soldier Zobiles (冥府兵ゾビル, Meifuhei Zobiru)
Zombie-like soldiers who wield axes and follow the High Zobile. There are thousands of them in the lair. Underneath their helmets are their repulsive rotting skulls with maggots covering them. In the finale, they are shown with builder hats building the bridge that links the surface world to Infershia.
Hades Corporal High Zobiles (冥府伍長ハイゾビル, Meifu Gochō Hai Zobiru)
Higher-ranked Zobiles who wield either large spear-like staffs or whips and leads the Zobiles into battle as a field commander. They can also control some of the Hades Beasts. While they first appeared in Stage 1, they first fought the Magirangers in Stage 3, where the one they fought against and was beaten by the Magirangers was killed by Branken as punishment for incompetence. Branken was originally a High Zobile himself. Toad occasionally ate High Zobile from a bowl.

==== Hades Beasts ====
The Hades Beasts (冥獣, Meijū) are the first wave of monsters to fight the Magirangers, sent by Branken to kill humans in hopes that one of their victims is Lunagel, whose death would open the gate.

==== Hades Beastmen ====
The Hades Beastmen (冥獣人, Meijūjin) are the second wave of monsters to fight the Magirangers, previously humans who sold their souls to N Ma and were more powerful and intelligent than ordinary Hades Beasts. They had been sealed away by Blagel, but were set free by Meemy where they are bound to serve him as commanded by the Dark Contract to sacrifice many humans so that N Ma could be revived.

==== Infershia Pantheon ====
The Infershia Pantheon (冥府十神, Meifu Jusshin) are the antagonists of the second half of the series, composed of ten giant-sized deities residing in the Valley of the Gods (神々の谷, Kamigami no Tani) until they were revived upon N Ma's death to deliver Divine Punishment (神罰, Shinbatsu) on mankind with any interference having grave consequences for both the surface world and Magitopia. The reason for this is because the Hades Gods' deaths serve an alternate purpose in providing N Ma with a vessel he selects from among the survivors. Each deity follows a self-made code of conduct called the Dark Precept (闇の戒律, Yami no Kairitsu), using the Slab of Judgement (裁きの石版, Sabaki no Sekiban) to pick the chosen god to cast divine retribution with a dark aurora heralding their arrival to the surface, assuming a human-size form to carry out the punishment. Should they choose to play games with anyone, they must abide by the rules they made. They are divided into three groups: The Three Wise Gods (三賢神, Sankenshin), Five Warrior Gods (五武神, Gobushin), and the Two Ultimate Gods (二極神, Nikyokushin).

== Episodes ==
1. The Morning of Departure ~Maagi Magi Magiiro~ (旅立ちの朝～マージ・マジ・マジーロ～, Tabidachi no Asa ~Māji Maji Majīro~)
2. Bring Out the Courage ~Maagi Magi Magika~ (勇気を出して～マージ・マジ・マジカ～, Yūki o Dashite ~Māji Maji Majika~)
3. Ride the Magical Dragon ~Maagi Giruma Jinga~ (魔竜に乗れ～マージ・ジルマ・ジンガ～, Maryū ni Nore ~Māji Jiruma Jinga~)
4. The King of the Majin ~Maagi Giruma Magi Jinga~ (魔人の王様～マージ・ジルマ・マジ・ジンガ～, Majin no Ōsama ~Māji Jiruma Maji Jinga~)
5. The Way of Love! ~Maagi Magiiro~ (恋をしようよ～マージ・マジーロ～, Koi o Shiyō yo ~Māji Majīro~)
6. The Ruler of Darkness ~Uuza Douza Uru Zanga~ (闇の覇王～ウーザ・ドーザ・ウル・ザンガ～, Yami no Haō ~Ūza Dōza Uru Zanga~)
7. Into the Dream ~Jinga Magiiro~ (夢の中へ～ジンガ・マジーロ～, Yume no Naka e ~Jinga Majīro~)
8. You're Just the Heroine ~Majuna Majuna~ (君こそヒロイン～マジュナ・マジュナ～, Kimi Koso Hiroin ~Majuna Majuna~)
9. Fiery Friendship Fusion ~Giruma Maagi Magi Jinga~ (炎の友情合体～ジルマ・マージ・マジ・ジンガ～, Honō no Yūjō Gattai ~Jiruma Māji Maji Jinga~)
10. If the Flower Blooms ~Giruma Magika~ (花が咲いたら～ジルマ・マジカ～, Hana ga Saita ra ~Jiruma Majika~)
11. Night of the Vampires ~Magiiro Magika~ (吸血鬼の夜～マジーロ・マジカ～, Kyūketsuki no Yoru ~Majīro Majika~)
12. The Mark of Determination ~Maagi Giruma Magi Magika~ (決意のしるし～マージ・ジルマ・マジ・マジカ～, Ketsui no Shirushi ~Māji Jiruma Maji Majika~)
13. If I Were Mother ~Jinga Majuna~ (お母さんなら～ジンガ・マジュナ～, Okāsan Nara ~Jinga Majuna~)
14. Burn, Punch ~Gii Gii Jijiru~ (燃えろパンチ～ジー・ジー・ジジル～, Moero Panchi ~Jī Jī Jijiru~)
15. The Bride's Elder Brother ~Giruma Magi Majuna~ (花嫁の兄～ジルマ・マジ・マジュナ～, Hanayome no Ani ~Jiruma Maji Majuna~)
16. The Gate's Key ~Uzaara Ugaro~ (門の鍵～ウザーラ・ウガロ～, Mon no Kagi ~Uzāra Ugaro~)
17. Tenderness Isn't Needed ~Uuza Douza Uru Ugaro~ (優しさはいらない～ウーザ・ドーザ・ウル・ウガロ～, Yasashisa wa Iranai ~Ūza Dōza Uru Ugaro~)
18. Uniting Powers ~Maagi Giruma Gii Jinga~ (力を合わせて～マージ・ジルマ・ジー・ジンガ～, Chikara o Awasete ~Māji Jiruma Jī Jinga~)
19. The Magic Lamp ~Meeza Zazare~ (魔法のランプ～メーザ・ザザレ～, Mahō no Ranpu ~Mēza Zazare~)
20. Kiss Me, Ribbit ~Goolu Golu Goludiiro~ (キスしてケロ～ゴール・ゴル・ゴルディーロ～, Kisu Shite Kero ~Gōru Goru Gorudīro~)
21. Let's Go on the Magic Express ~Goo Goo Goludiiro~ (魔法特急で行こう～ゴー・ゴー・ゴルディーロ～, Mahō Tokkyū de Ikō ~Gō Gō Gorudīro~)
22. A Date in Kyoto? ~Luuma Goludo~ (京都でデート？～ルーマ・ゴルド～, Kyōto de Dēto? ~Rūma Gorudo~)
23. Forbidden Magic ~Rooji Maneeji Magi Mamaruji~ (禁断の魔法～ロージ・マネージ・マジ・ママルジ～, Kindan no Mahō ~Rōji Menēji Maji Mamaruji~)
24. As Your Teacher ~Golu Golu Gojika~ (先生として～ゴル・ゴル・ゴジカ～, Sensei Toshite ~Goru Goru Gojika~)
25. Stolen Courage ~Giruma Magi Magiiro~ (盗まれた勇気～ジルマ・マジ・マジーロ～, Nusumareta Yūki ~Jiruma Maji Majīro~)
26. Believe!! ~Giruma Gii Magika~ (信じろよ！～ジルマ・ジー・マジカ～, Shinjiro yo! ~Jiruma Jī Majika~)
27. Our Bonds ~Magiine Magiine~ (俺たちの絆～マジーネ・マジーネ～, Ore-tachi no Kizuna ~Majīne Majīne~)
28. Eternally… ~Giruma Magi Magi Magiine~ (永遠に…～ジルマ・マジ・マジ・マジーネ～, Eien ni… ~Jiruma Maji Maji Majīne~)
29. Repeating "Huh?" ~Gii Magi Magiiro~ (くり返す「あれ？」～ジー・マジ・マジーロ～, Kurikaesu "Are?" ~Jī Maji Majīro~)
30. Legendary Power ~Maagi Magi Magi Magiiro~ (伝説の力～マージ・マジ・マジ・マジーロ～, Densetsu no Chikara ~Māji Maji Maji Majīro~)
31. The Extraordinary Majin ~Maagi Giruma Golu Jingajin~ (凄まじき魔神～マージ・ジルマ・ゴル・ジンガジン～, Susamajiki Majin ~Māji Jiruma Goru Jingajin~)
32. Dad's Words ~Maagi Giruma Golu Gogika~ (父の言葉～マージ・ジルマ・ゴル・ゴジカ～, Chichi no Kotoba ~Māji Jiruma Goru Gojika~)
33. To the Infershia ~Maagi Golu Magika~ (インフェルシアへ～マージ・ゴル・マジカ～, Inferushia e ~Māji Goru Majika~)
34. Bonds of Courage ~Goolu Golu Goludo~ (勇気の絆～ゴール・ゴル・ゴルド～, Yūki no Kizuna ~Gōru Goru Gorudo~)
35. Valley of the Gods ~Magi Magi Jijiru~ (神々の谷～マジ・マジ・ジジル～, Kamigami no Tani ~Maji Maji Jijiru~)
36. Carrying Out Divine Retribution ~Maagi Golu Gogika~ (神罰執行～マージ・ゴル・ゴジカ～, Shinbatsu Shikkō ~Māji Goru Gojika~)
37. Sniping ~Golu Maagi~ (狙い撃ち～ゴル・マージ～, Neraiuchi ~Goru Māji~)
38. A Promise With Big Brother ~Goo Magiiro~ (アニキとの約束～ゴー・マジーロ～, Aniki to no Yakusoku ~Gō Majīro~)
39. Contrary Brother and Sister ~Majuna Giruma~ (あべこべ姉弟～マジュナ・ジルマ～, Abekobe Kyōdai ~Majuna Jiruma~)
40. The Gorgon's Garden ~Magine Luludo~ (蛇女の庭～マジーネ・ルルド～, Hebi-on'na no Niwa ~Majīne Rurudo~)
41. The Teacher's Teacher ~Goolu Golu Majuulu~ (先生の先生～ゴール・ゴル・マジュール～, Sensei no Sensei ~Gōru Goru Majūru~)
42. Confrontation! Two Ultimate Gods ~Goolu Luuma Golu Gonga~ (対決！二極神～ゴール・ルーマ・ゴル・ゴンガ～, Taiketsu! Nikyokushin ~Gōru Rūma Goru Gonga~)
43. The Garden of Thorns ~Magi Magi Gogika~ (茨の園～マジ・マジ・ゴジカ～, Ibara no Sono ~Maji Maji Gojika~)
44. Mother's Scent ~Giruma Giruma Gonga~ (母さんの匂い～ジルマ・ジルマ・ゴンガ～, Kāsan no Nioi ~Jiruma Jiruma Gonga~)
45. Those Two Are Friends ~Gii Golu Majuna~ (二人はともだち～ジー・ゴル・マジュナ～, Futari wa Tomodachi ~Jī Goru Majuna~)
46. Head to the Lake ~Goolu Golu Golu Goludiiro~ (湖へ向かえ～ゴール・ゴル・ゴル・ゴルディーロ～, Mizuumi e Mukae ~Gōru Goru Goru Gorudīro~)
47. Using Magic to Reach You ~Luludo Goludiiro~ (君にかける魔法～ルルド・ゴルディーロ～, Kimi ni Kakeru Mahō ~Rurudo Gorudīro~)
48. Decisive Battle ~Magi Majuulu Gogoolu Jingajin~ (決戦～マジ・マジュール・ゴゴール・ジンガジン～, Kessen ~Maji Majūru Gogōru Jingajin~)
49. Legends Return ~Maagi Magi Majendo~ (伝説への帰還～マージ・マジ・マジェンド～, Densetsu e no Kikan ~Māji Maji Majendo~)

== Production ==
The Mahō Sentai trademark was registered by Toei on May 31, 2004, around 4-month before of trademark for the Magiranger's team name, The Magiranger trademark was registered on September 22, 2004.

== Films ==
=== Theatrical ===
==== Bride of Infershia ====
Mahō Sentai Magiranger the Movie: Bride of Infershia (魔法戦隊マジレンジャー THE MOVIE インフェルシアの花嫁, Mahō Sentai Majirenjā Za Mūbī Inferushia no Hanayome): A 2005 film that takes place between Stages 25 and 26.

=== V-Cinema ===
- Mahō Sentai Magiranger vs. Dekaranger (魔法戦隊マジレンジャーVSデカレンジャー, Mahō Sentai Magirenjā Tai Dekarenjā): A 2005 V-Cinema release that takes place between Stages 31 and 32.
- GoGo Sentai Boukenger vs. Super Sentai (轟轟戦隊ボウケンジャーVSスーパー戦隊, Gōgō Sentai Bōkenjā Tai Sūpā Sentai): A 2007 V-Cinema release that takes place between Episodes 42 and 43 of GoGo Sentai Boukenger.

=== Other Specials ===
- Mahō Sentai Magiranger: Revealed! The Gold Grip Phone's Super Magic ~Golu Goolu Goo Goo~ (魔法戦隊マジレンジャー 大公開!黄金(ゴールド)グリップフォンの超魔法～ゴル・ゴール・ゴー・ゴー～, Dai Kōkai! Gōrudo Gurippu Fon no Chō Mahō ~Goru Gōru Gō Gō~): A 2005 special DVD.
- Hero Mama League (ヒーローママ★リーグ, Hīrō Mama Rīgu): A 2018 Toei Tokusatsu Fan Club-exclusive special.

== Cast ==
- Kai Ozu: Atsushi Hashimoto (橋本 淳, Hashimoto Atsushi)
- Tsubasa Ozu: Hiroya Matsumoto (松本 寛也, Matsumoto Hiroya)
- Urara Ozu: Asami Kai (甲斐 麻美, Kai Asami)
- Houka Ozu: Ayumi Beppu (別府 あゆみ, Beppu Ayumi)
- Makito Ozu: Yuki Ito (伊藤 友樹, Itō Yūki)
- Hikaru: Yousuke Ichikawa (市川 洋介, Ichikawa Yōsuke)
- Miyuki Ozu, Goddess of the Spring (Special DVD): Azusa Watanabe (渡辺 梓, Watanabe Azusa)
- Isamu Ozu: Tsutomu Isobe (磯部 勉, Isobe Tsutomu)
- Yuka Yamazaki: Kaoru Hirata (平田 薫, Hirata Kaoru)
- Eriko Ikeda (池田 江里子, Ikeda Eriko): Sayaka Fukuoka (福岡 サヤカ, Fukuoka Sayaka)
- Tetsuya (テツヤ): Gen Igarashi (五十嵐 元, Igarashi Gen)
- Nai: Chiaki Horan (ホラン 千秋, Horan Chiaki)
- Mea: Tomomi Kitagami (北神 朋美, Kitagami Tomomi)
- Rin: Meibi Yamanouchi (山内 明日, Yamanouchi Meibi)
- Magiel: Machiko Soga (曽我 町子, Soga Machiko)

=== Voice cast ===
- Mandora Boy, Announcer (calls each episode's title): Kumiko Higa (比嘉 久美子, Higa Kumiko)
- Smoky: Takeshi Kusao (草尾 毅, Kusao Takeshi)
- Snowgel: Keiko Han (潘 恵子, Han Keiko)
- Hades Beast Emperor N Ma: Katsumi Shiono (塩野 勝美, Shiono Katsumi)
- Absolute God N Ma: Daisuke Namikawa (浪川 大輔, Namikawa Daisuke)
- Branken: Hisao Egawa (江川 央生, Egawa Hisao)
- Vanculia: Misa Watanabe (渡辺 美佐, Watanabe Misa)
- Meemy, Raigel: Yasuhiro Takato (高戸 靖広, Takato Yasuhiro)
- Sleipnir: Hideyuki Umezu (梅津 秀行, Umezu Hideyuki)
- Drake: Kazuki Yao (矢尾 一樹, Yao Kazuki)
- Dagon: Akio Ōtsuka (大塚 明夫, Ōtsuka Akio)
- Sphinx: Kyoko Terase (寺瀬 今日子, Terase Kyōko)
- Gorgon: Atsuko Tanaka (田中 敦子, Tanaka Atsuko)
- Titan: Mitsuru Ogata (小形 満, Ogata Mitsuru)
- Wyvern: Nozomu Sasaki (佐々木 望, Sasaki Nozomu)
- Toad: Masato Hirano (平野 正人, Hirano Masato)
- Cyclops: Ryōtarō Okiayu (置鮎 龍太郎, Okiayu Ryōtarō)
- Ifrit: Tetsu Inada (稲田 徹, Inada Tetsu)
- Zobile, High Zobile: Katsumi Shiono, Yuki Anai (穴井 勇輝, Anai Yūki)
- Magiranger Equipment, Narrator: Tesshō Genda (玄田 哲章, Genda Tesshō)

== Songs ==
Opening theme

- "Mahō Sentai Magiranger" (魔法戦隊マジレンジャー, Mahō Sentai Majirenjā)
  - Lyrics: Yuho Iwasato
  - Composition: Takafumi Iwasaki
  - Arrangement: Seiichi Kyōda
  - Artist: Takafumi Iwasaki (岩崎 貴文, Iwasaki Takafumi)

Ending theme

- "Jumon Kōrin ~ Magical Force" (呪文降臨～マジカル・フォース, Jumon Kōrin ~ Majikaru Fōsu) "The Spell Advent ~ Magical Force"
  - Lyrics: Yuho Iwasato
  - Composition: YOFFY
  - Arrangement: Psychic Lover & Kenichirō Ōishi
  - Artist: Sister MAYO
