= One Missed Call (TV series) =

- Written by: Tetsuya Ooishi; Naoya Takayama
- Directed by: Manabu Asou
- Starring: Rei Kikukawa; Ken Ishiguro; Shinji Yamashita; Takeshi Masu; Kanji Tsuda; Mayuko Iwasa
- Original language: Japanese
- No. of seasons: 1
- No. of episodes: 10

Production
- Producer: Kiyoshi Kuwata
- Running time: 45 minutes

Original release
- Release: 14 October – 16 December 2005

One Missed Call (Japanese: 着信アリ, Hepburn: Chakushin ari) is a horror television series based on the popular Japanese film series One Missed Call. It aired on TV Asahi in 2005.

== Synopsis ==
Yumi (Rei Kikukawa), a writer of a science magazine, witnesses a mysterious death of a high school girl who received a "one missed call" from her own cell phone, two weeks in the future. The disturbing message on the cell phone turns out to be the screams of the victim.

== Cast ==
Actor/Actress	Role
Rei Kikukawa	Yumi Nakamura
Ken Ishiguro	Sendou
Shinji Yamashita	Akino
Takeshi Masu	
Kanji Tsuda	
Mayuko Iwasa	
Chiaki Satō	
Ikkei Watanabe	
Natsuko Hoshino	Tomoka Akino
