= Atsushi Hashimoto =

Japanese actor (born 1987)

- 橋本 淳
- Born: January 14, 1987 (age 39); Tokyo, Japan
- Occupation: Actor
- Years active: 2004-present

Atsushi Hashimoto (橋本 淳, Hashimoto Atsushi; born January 14, 1987 in Tokyo) is a Japanese actor who is affiliated with Amuse, Inc. He played the role of Kai Ozu (Magi Red), the main character of the 2005 Super Sentai TV series Mahou Sentai Magiranger.

== Biography ==
Hashimoto had an interest in acting since he was in high school as a junior. He auditioned for an entertainment office on the basis of the magazine at the time of his first year high school, he passed and belonged to Amuse, Inc.

In 2004, Hashimoto debuted in Water Boys 2. In 2005, he starred in the 29th Super Sentai series, Mahou Sentai Magiranger; in 2007, he appeared in Asadora's Chiritotechin as the heroine's brother; in 2014, he appeared in the drama, Gunshi Kanbei; in 2015, he appeared in Drama Series W, such as Yumewoataeru, and appeared on other television dramas and films.

Hashimoto's stage work of the director of recent years various talented people (such as Amon Miyamoto) they had appeared in.

In 2014, he appeared in the stage play History Boys and won the 22nd Yomiuri Theater Grand Prix Excellence Award. Hashimoto was in the 59th Kishida Drama Award in a meeting of the play Troisgros, and his work was awarded.

== Filmography ==
=== TV series ===
Year	Title	Role	Other notes	Ref.
2005-06	Mahō Sentai Magiranger	Kai Ozu/Magi Red	Lead role	
2014	Gunshi Kanbei	Utsunomiya Tomofusa	Taiga drama	
2024	1122: For a Happy Marriage	real estate agent		
2024	My Girlfriend's Child	Yūto Okita		
2025	Unbound	Kitao Shigemasa	Taiga drama	
2025	Scandal Eve	Makoto Kagawa		
2026	The Ghost Writer's Wife	Sakuyama	Asadora	

=== Film ===
Year	Title	Role	Other notes	Ref.
2005	Mahō Sentai Magiranger the Movie: Bride of Infershia	Kai Ozu/Magi Red	Lead role	
2025	Not Me That Went Viral			
2025	The Final Piece			
2026	Piccola Felicità	Reo Tanaka		
2026	Fujiko			
2026	The Ogre's Bride			
2026	The Day After Sunday	Koichi		
2027	10 Things I Want to Do Before I Turn 40: The Movie	Shinta Hashimoto		
