= Yuki Ito (actor) =

Japanese actor and musician

Yuki Ito (伊藤 友樹, Itō Yūki; born January 24, 1985) is a Japanese actor and musician from Tokyo Prefecture. The role he is most known for is as Makito Ozu/MagiGreen (小津蒔人／マジグリーン, Ozu Makito/MajiGurīn) in Mahō Sentai Magiranger.
