= Shingen-ko Festival =

Annual traditional Japanese festival

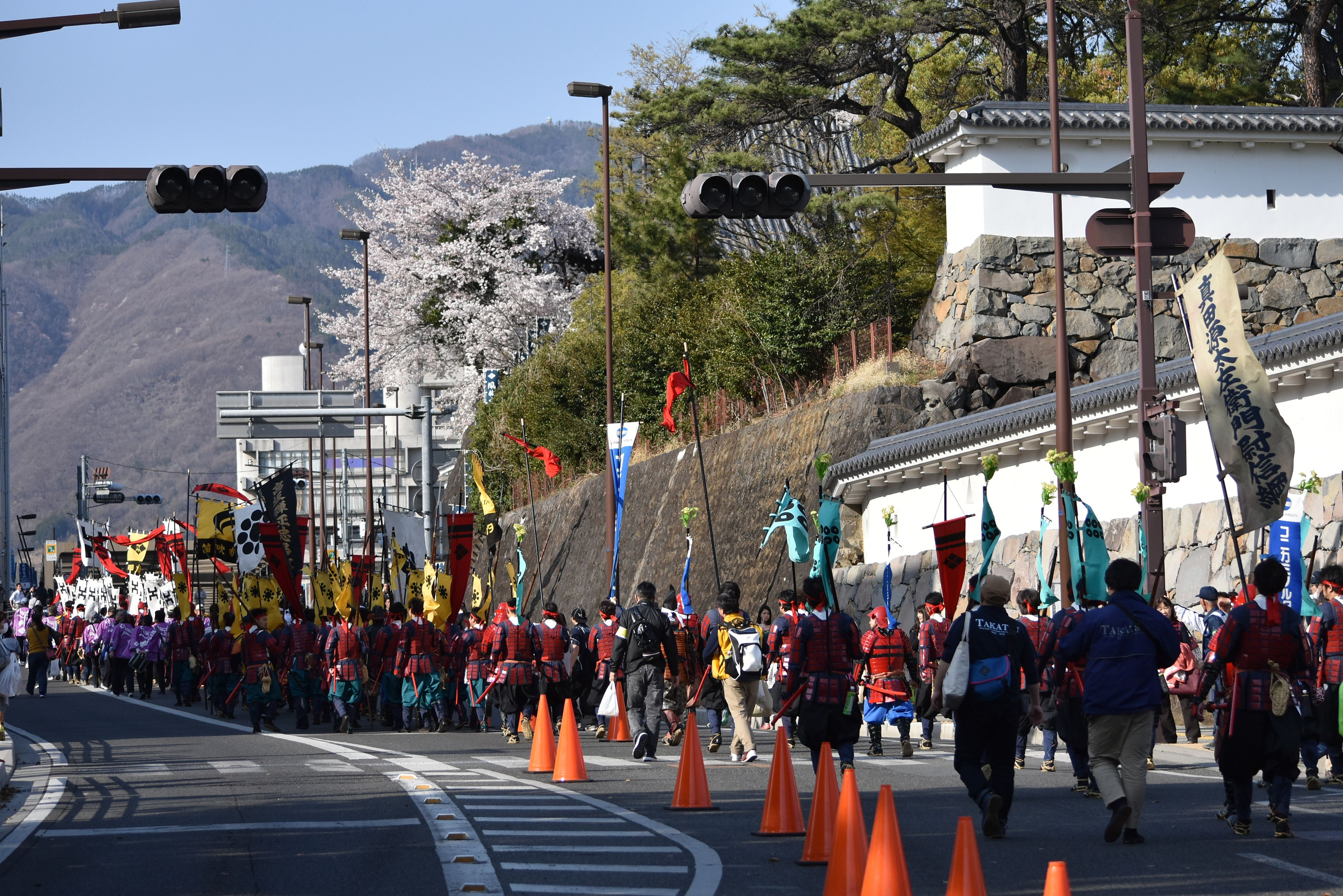
- Shingen-ko Festival Maizuru-dori army corps
- Observed by: Japan
- Type: historical reenactment
- Begins: The first or second weekend of April
- Ends: After three days
- Duration: Three days
- Frequency: annual, in April
- Related to: Samurai, Takeda Shingen, daimyō

The Shingen-kō Festival (信玄公祭り, Shingen-ko Matsuri) is a Japanese festival (matsuri) which is held annually to celebrate the legacy of daimyō Takeda Shingen in Kōfu, the capital city of Yamanashi Prefecture. It is the "largest gathering of samurai" in the world.

== Background ==
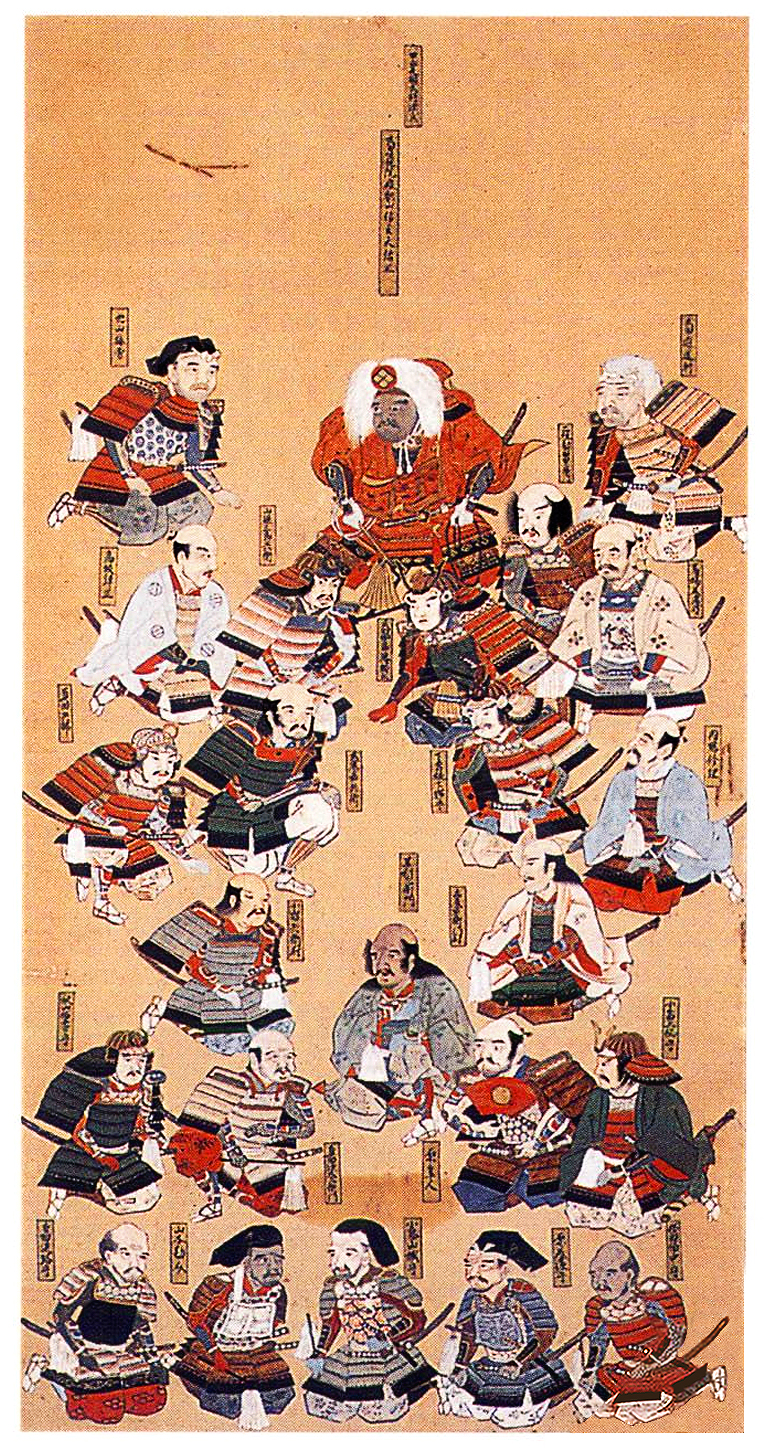
Takeda Shingen's 24 generals

Takeda Shingen (武田 信玄; 1 December 1521 – May 13, 1573), of Kai Province, was a pre-eminent daimyō in feudal Japan with exceptional military prestige in the late stage of the Sengoku period. Shingen was the feudal lord of present-day Kōfu. Shingen was admired by his followers and rivals. He had a legendary rivalry with Uesugi Kenshin and they fought a series of five battles during the Battles of Kawanakajima. Shingen died of a disease during his pursuit to conquer all of Japan.

24 retainers (generals) served under Shingen. They are noted for their exceptional contributions to Shingen and the Takeda family. They are a popular topic for ukiyo-e and bunraku.

== Description ==
This is a three-day festival that starts on the first or second weekend of April. Takeda's death anniversary is on April 12. There's a reenactment of Takeda Shingen's Koshu Battalion Deployment. People dress in traditional and samurai costumes of the Sengoku Period. An actor plays Takeda Shingen and he is surrounded by his Twenty-Four Generals. After the Shingen-ko Tea Ceremony, Takeda leads his army through the streets of Kōfu. They march from the plaza in front of Kōfu station through the streets of Kōfu to Maizuru Castle Park which contains the ruins of Kōfu Castle. On the third day they reach the Takeda Shrine (武田神社, Takeda Jinja). A Shinto ritual is held on the anniversary of Takeda Shingen's death.

There are multiple parades going to and from these locations. These parades are very theatrical involving serious reenactments who practice the rest of the year for this one weekend in April. The parades reflect the different comings and goings of Takeda Shingen during his life.

This is one of the largest historical reenactments in Japan. In 2012 the festival was included in the Guinness World Records as the "largest gathering of samurai" in the world with 1061 participants. The role of daimyo Takeda Shingen is usually played by a Japanese celebrity. The 24 generals have extra detailed armor. Seeing so many people in traditional costumes and more than 1000 samurai gives an impression of what the Sengoku Period was like (1467 – 1600 CE).

What's special is that anyone can join after a short application. Exchange students of the University of Yamanashi are usually the guard samurai group of the princess. The princess can also be represented by exchange students from Asian countries. So the festival is not fully historically accurate.

Each festival has more than 100,000 visitors from all over Japan and international tourists. In 2013 there were 130,000 visitors during the 3 days of the festival. Daimyo Takeda Shingen was played by the actor Ken Matsudaira. Part of the proceeds went to support the area affected by the 2011 Tōhoku earthquake and tsunami.

== Events ==
Each day has different kinds of events such as:

- Shingen-ko Tea Ceremony
- Ritual Prayer
- Street stalls with Yamanashi local products, food and drink stands
- Koihige Beard Style Contest
- Koihime Beauty Contest
- Sengoku Period Food Sampling
- "Fu-Rin-Ka-Zan" Dance Parade with 1000 performers
- Koshu Battalion Deployment
- Child Samurai Parade
- Takeda Period Parade
- Kendo Tournament
- Japanese Drum Taiko Performance
- Kofu Hayashi Performance – A Japanese traditional "Noh" performance in celebrating the battle victory
- Educational Lectures

== Gallery ==
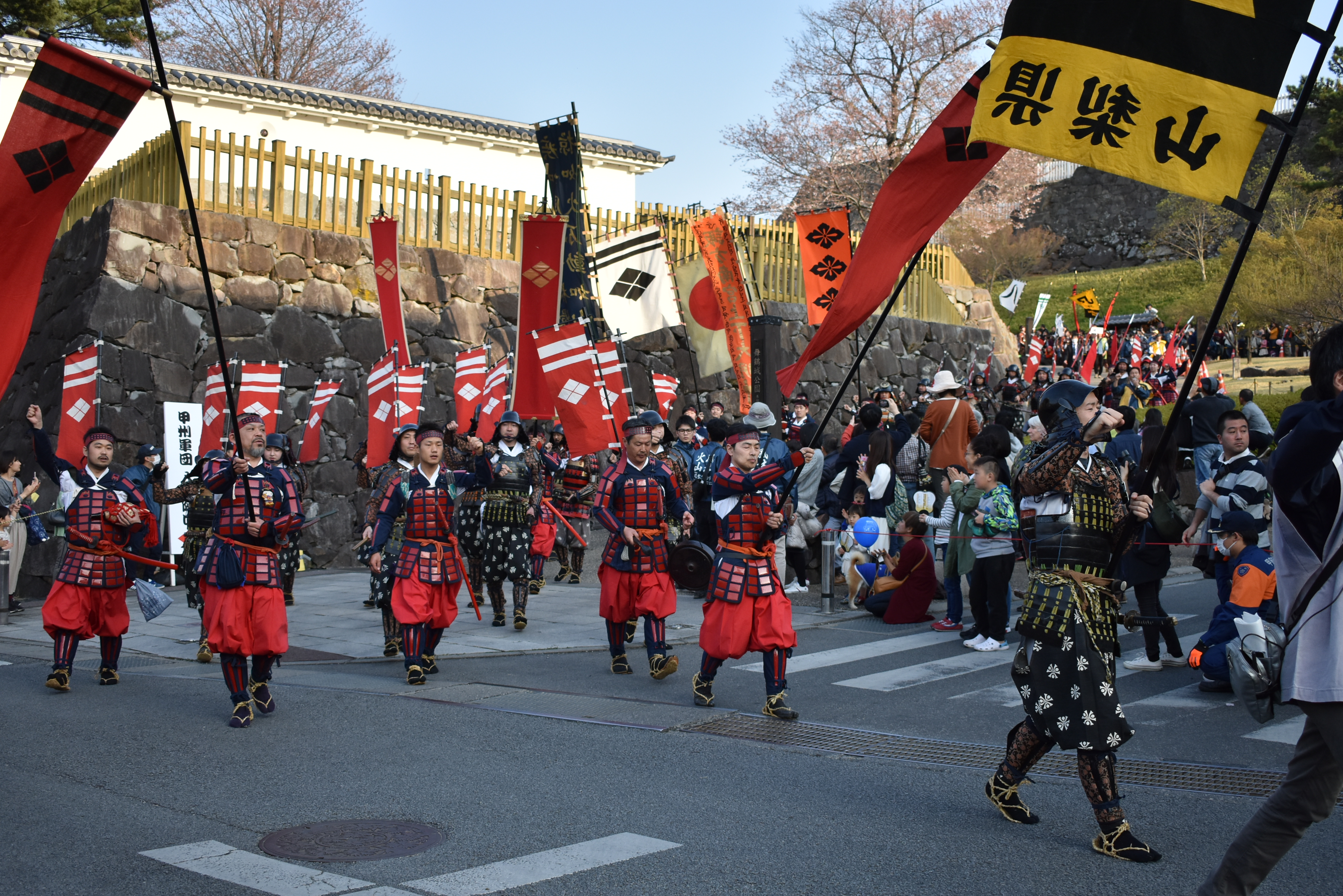
The army corps in front of Maizuru Castle Park (2019)

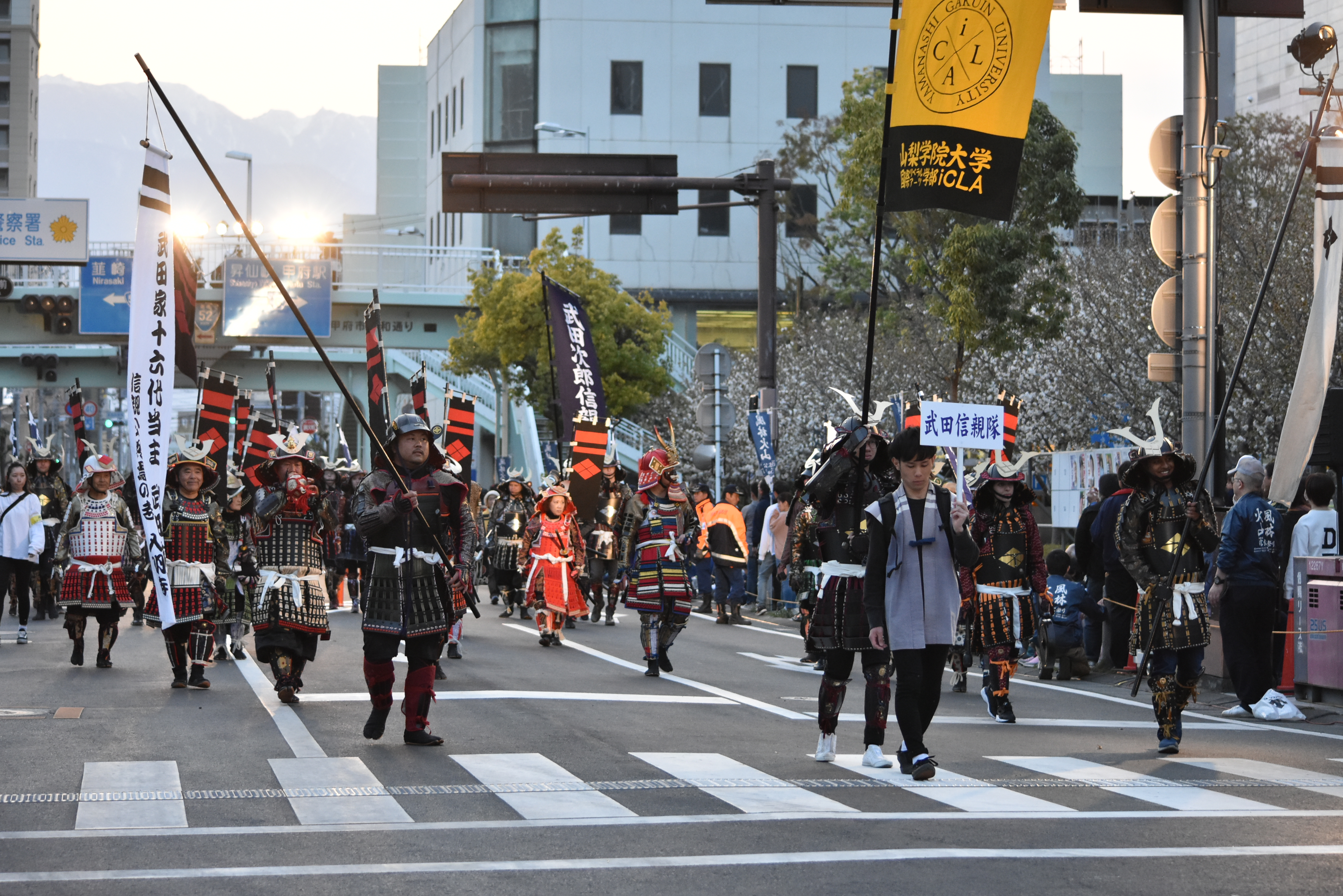
Takeda Jiro Shin Shintai Corps with students of University of Yamanashi (2019)

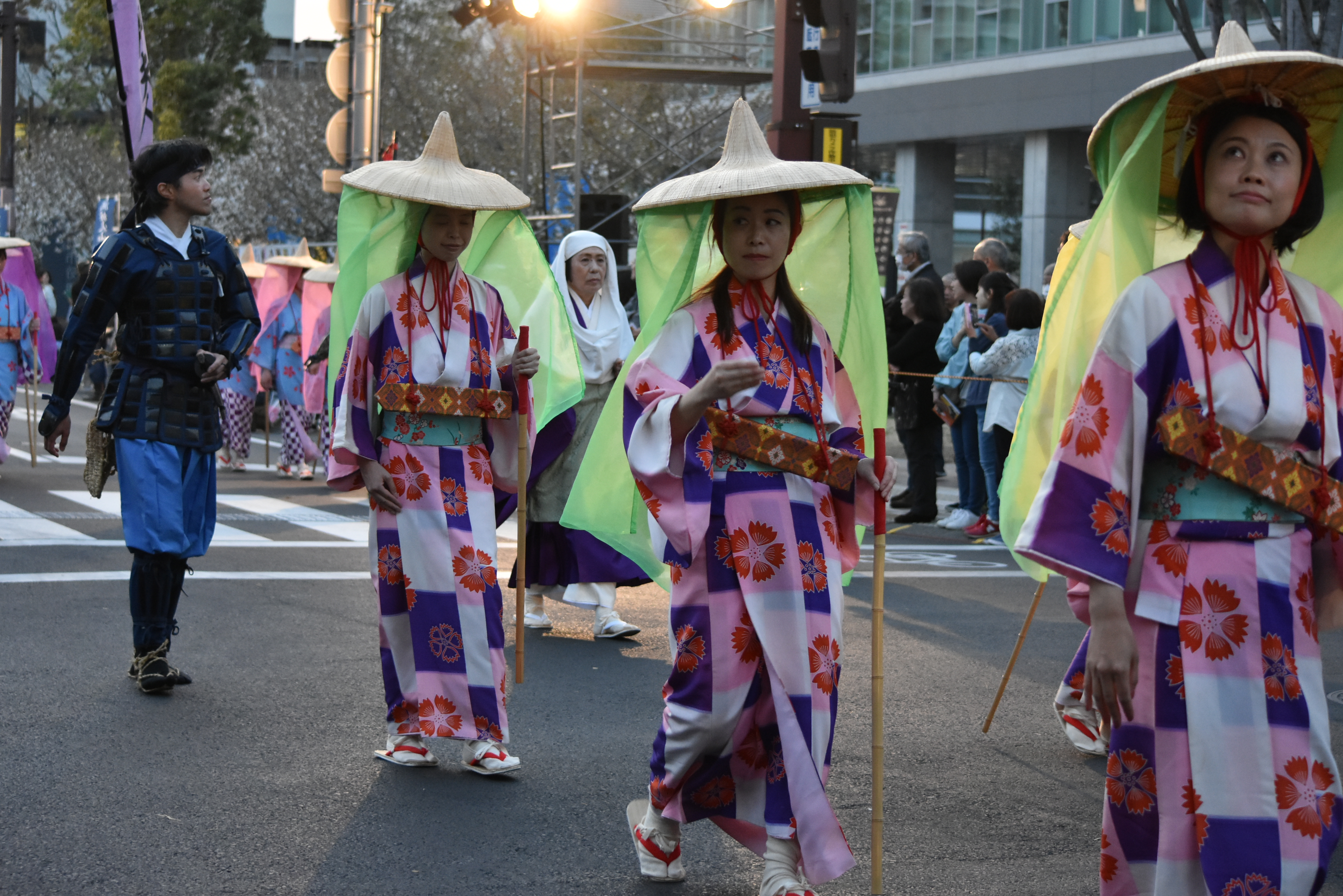
Mrs. Oi procession (2019)

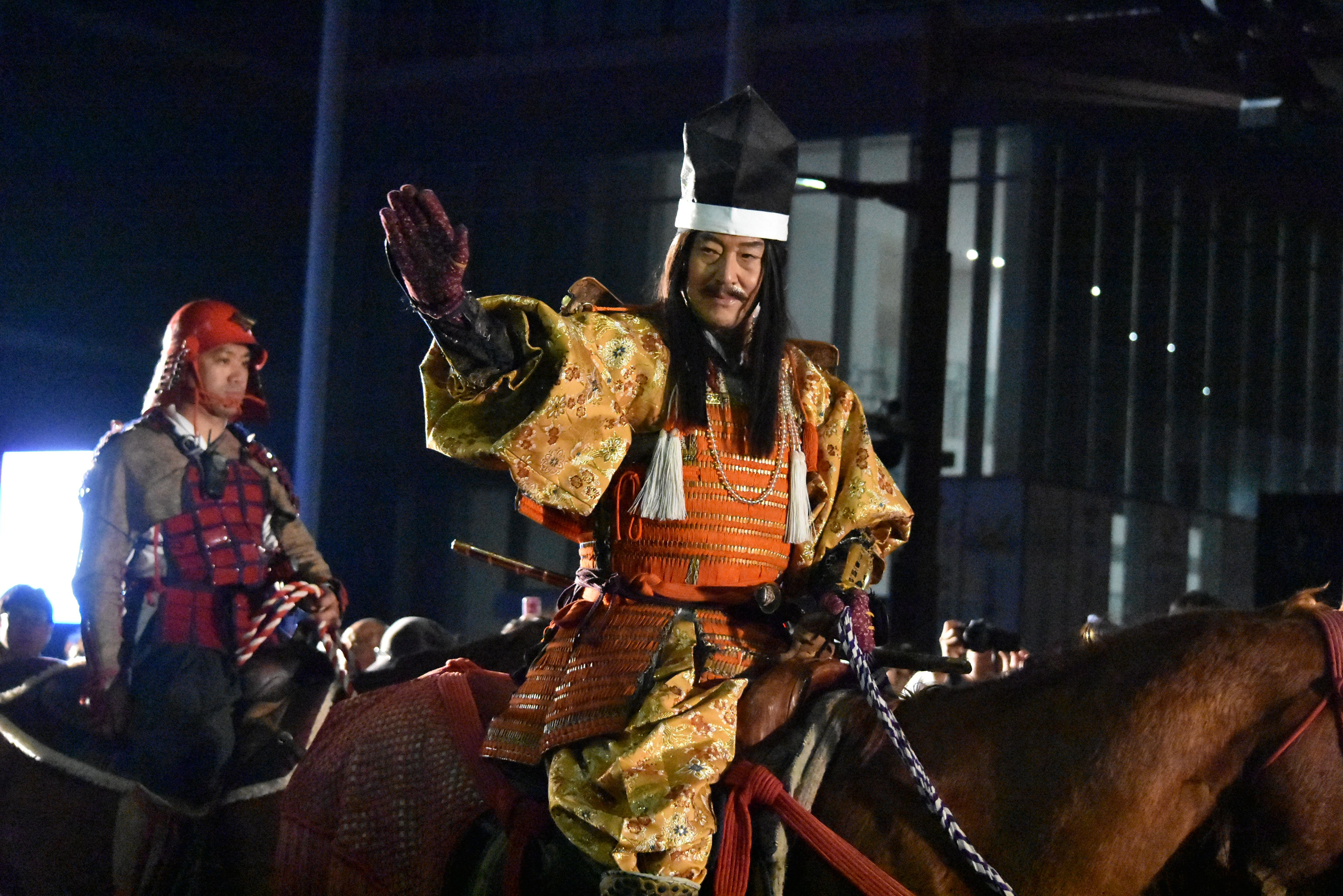
Actor plays Takeda Shingen (2019)

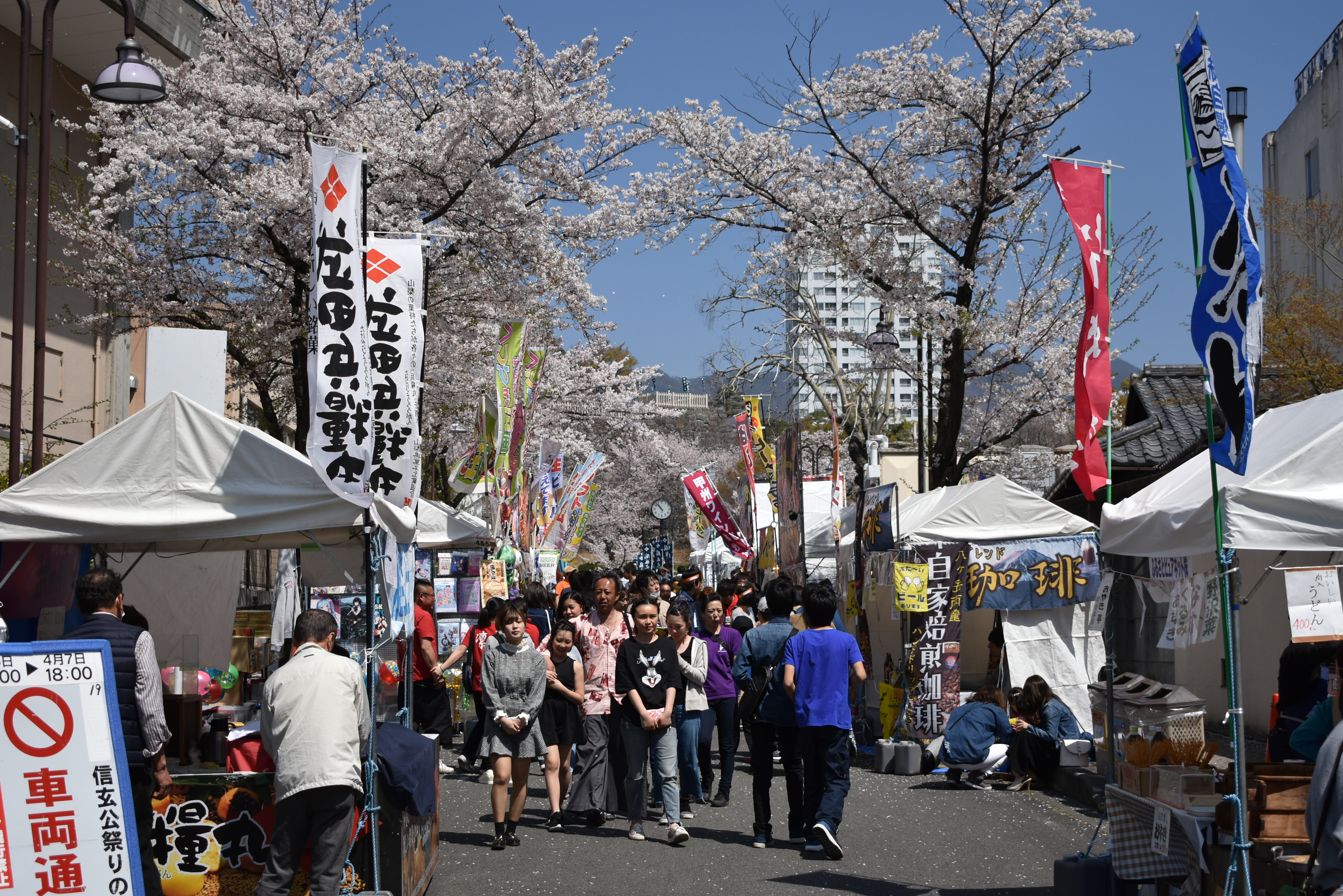
Shingen Gourmet Yokocho (2019)

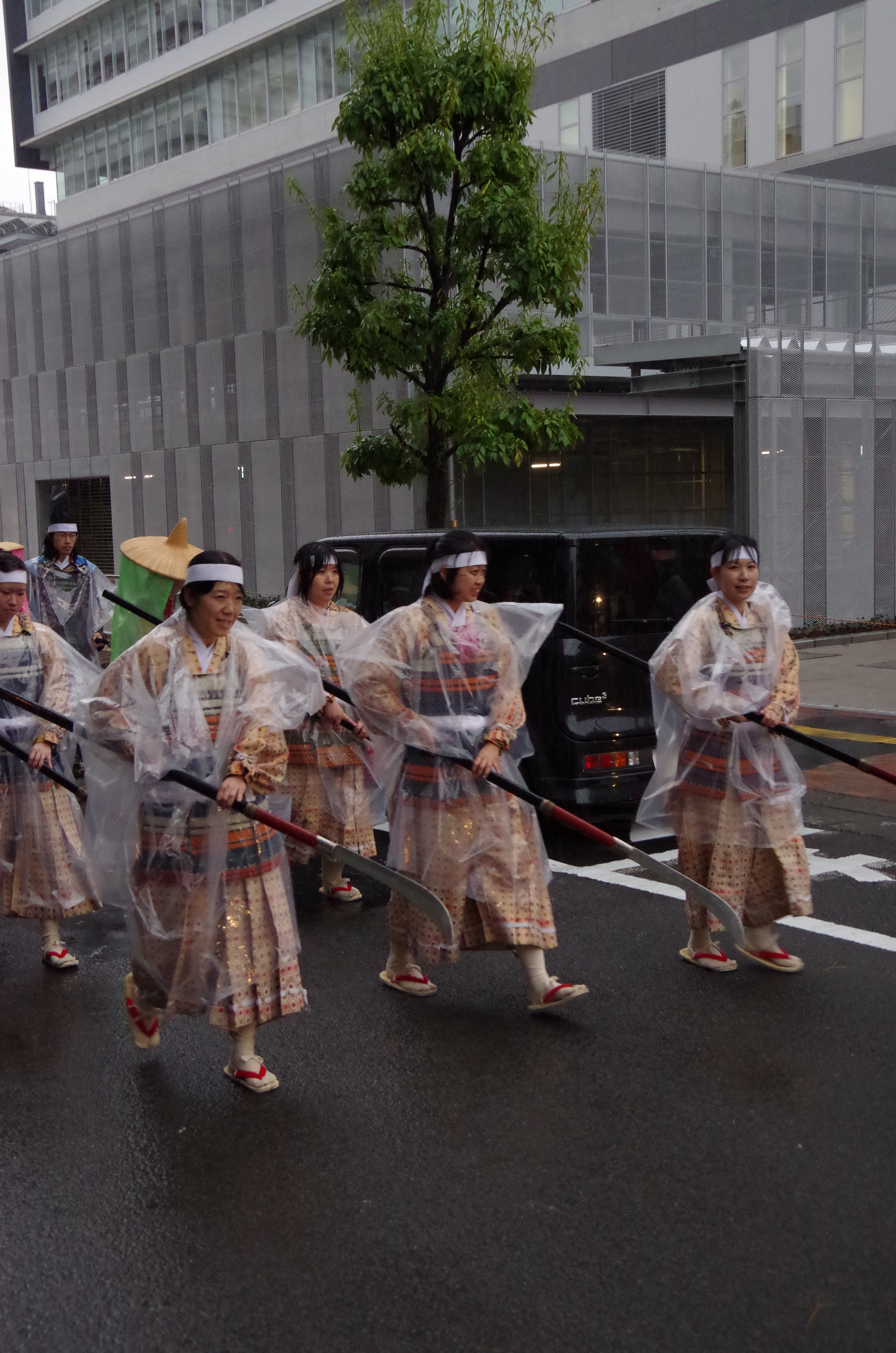
Onna-Bushi (Female Warriors) with Naginata (pole weapons)

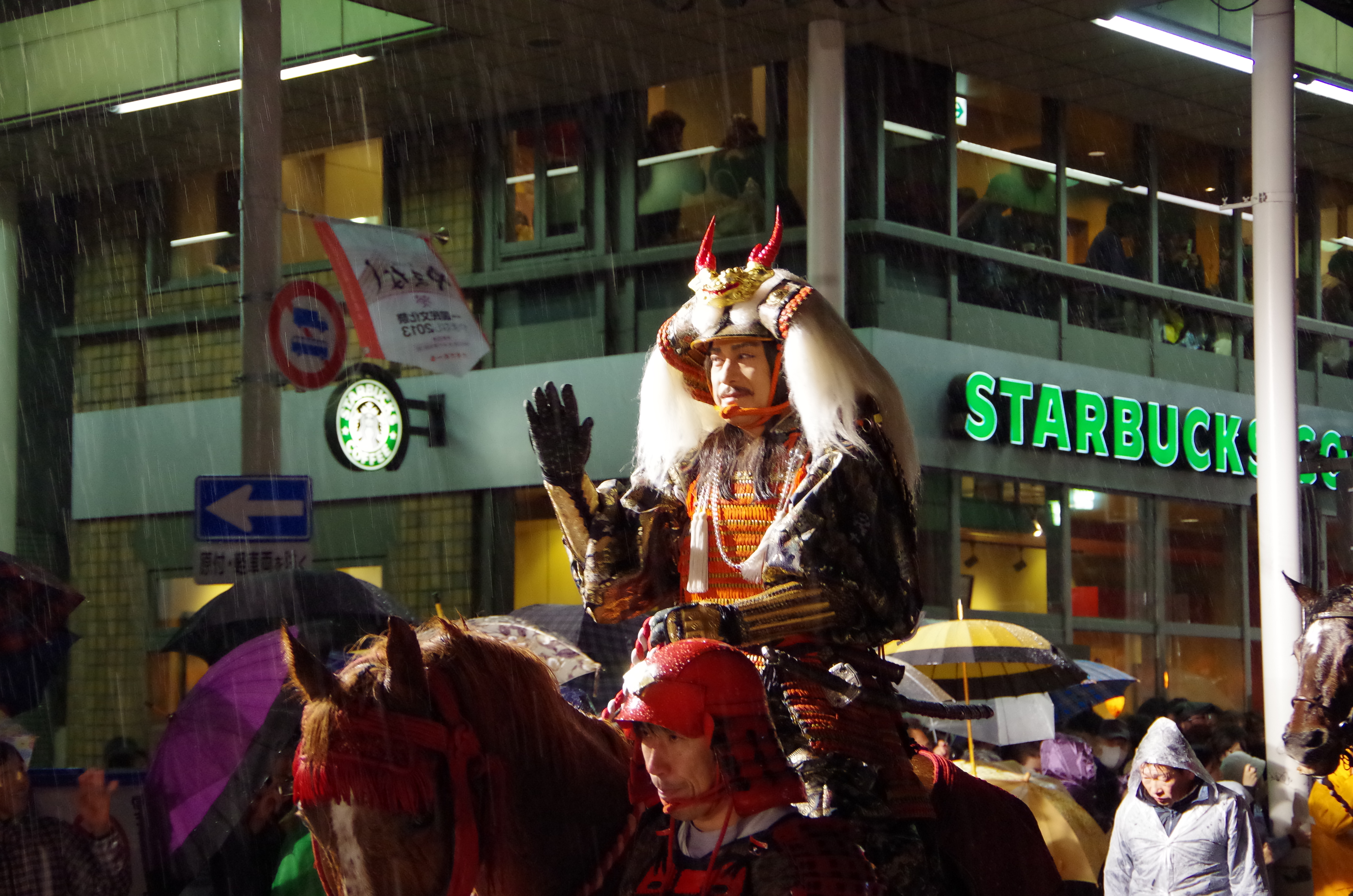
Takeda Shingen

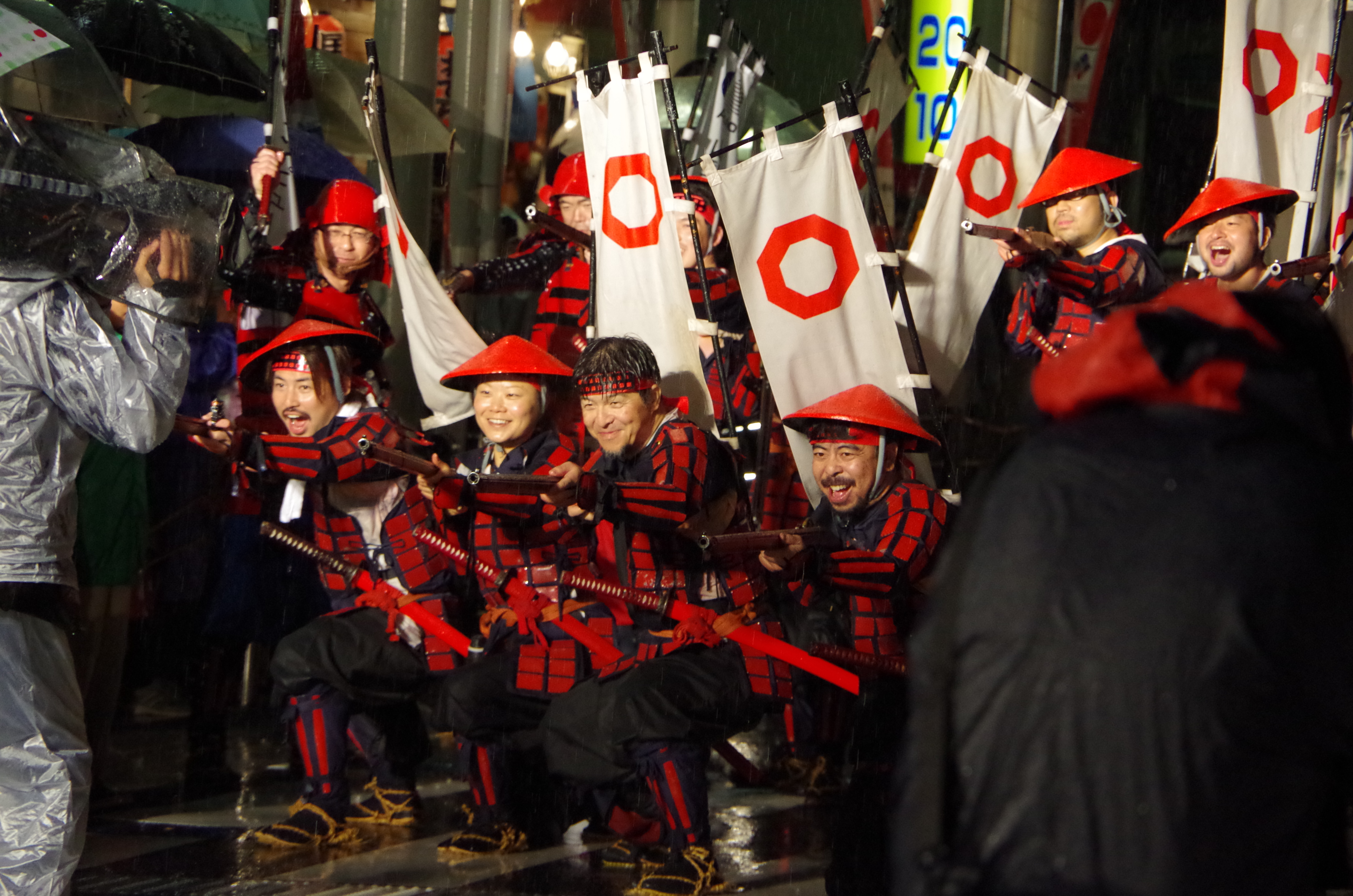
Japan had more handguns than the rest of the world in the Sengoku Period

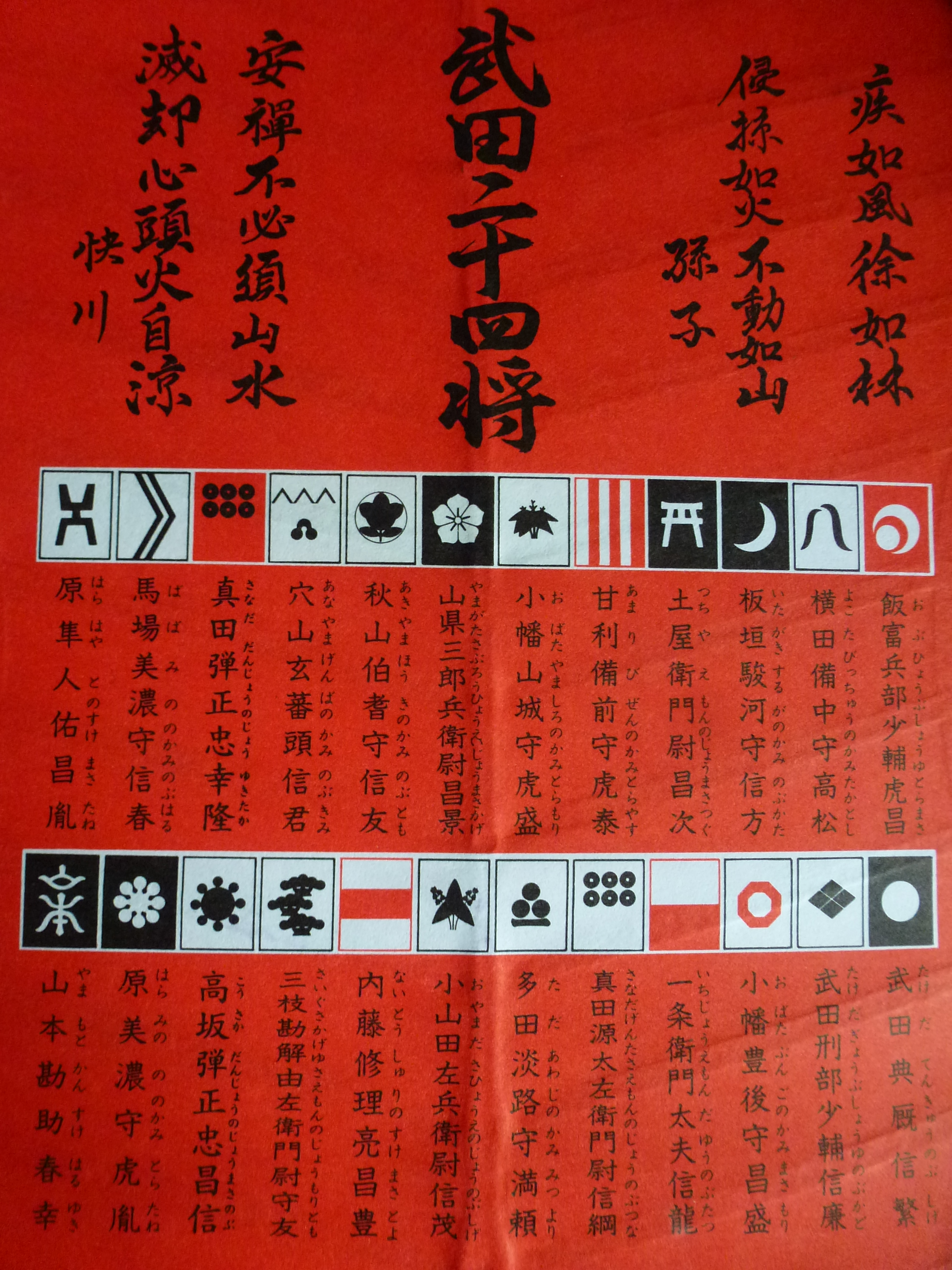
The coats of arms of the generals who appear.

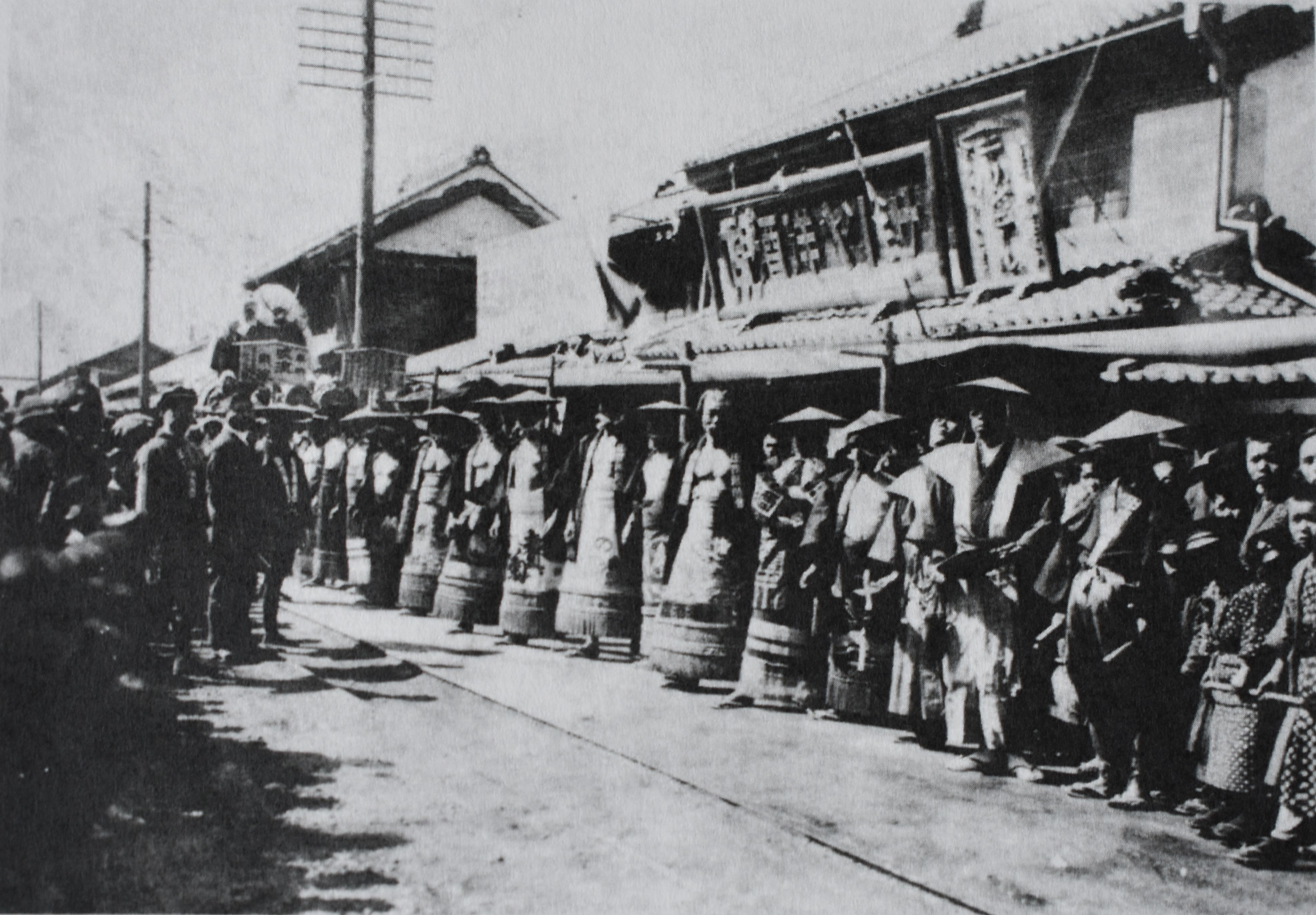
1918
