= Yousuke Ichikawa =

Japanese actor and model

- 市川 洋介
- Born: May 1, 1980 (age 45); Yokohama, Kanagawa Prefecture, Japan
- Occupations: Actor, model
- Years active: 2002-2008
- Height: 183 cm (6 ft 0 in)

Yousuke Ichikawa (市川 洋介, Ichikawa Yōsuke; born May 1, 1980 in Yokohama, Kanagawa Prefecture, Japan) is a Japanese former actor and model who is affiliated with Pocket. He graduated from Yokohama National University's University of Electro-Communications.

== Filmography ==
=== Television series ===
Year	Title	Role	Network	Other notes
2005	Mahou Sentai Magiranger	Hikaru / MagiShine	TV Asahi	
2008	Mito Kōmon	Hayano	TBS	Chapter 38, Episodes 1 and 2

== Retirement ==
On September 15, 2008, Ichikawa announced on his own blog that he had married a high school classmate and had retired from acting. He subsequently became a high school teacher.
