= Avataro Sentai Donbrothers =

Japanese drama

- Genre: Tokusatsu; Crossover fiction; Science fiction; Mystery; Superhero; Horror; Black comedy
- Created by: Saburo Yatsude (original story); Shotaro Ishinomori (special thanks)
- Written by: Toshiki Inoue; Saburo Yatsude
- Directed by: Ryuta Tasaki; Shojiro Nakazawa; Hiroyuki Kato; Hirofumi Fukuzawa; Katsuya Wantanbe; Kazuyuki Chatani; Kyohei Yamaguchi; Satoshi Morota
- Starring: Kouhei Higuchi; Yuuki Beppu; Kohaku Shida; Totaro; Hirofumi Suzuki; Raizou Ishikawa; Kiita Komagine; Yuya Tominaga; Amisa Miyazaki; Shinnosuke Takahashi; Tomoki Hirose; Mana Takai; Shin Koyanagi; Momoko Arata; Soko Wada
- Voices of: Ayumu Murase; Mamiko Noto
- Opening theme: "Ore koso Only One" by Win Morisaki
- Ending theme: "Don't Boo! Donbrothers" by Win Morisaki
- Composer: Kousuke Yamashita
- Country of origin: Japan
- Original language: Japanese
- No. of episodes: 50 (list of episodes)

Production
- Producers: Chihiro Inoue (TV Asahi); Takehiro Ōkawa (TV Asahi); Shinichiro Shirakura (Toei); Naomi Takebe (Toei); Kōichi Yada (Toei Advertising); Akihiro Fukada (Toei Advertising)
- Production location: Tokyo, Japan (Greater Tokyo Area)
- Running time: 24–25 minutes
- Production companies: TV Asahi; Toei Company; Toei Advertising

Original release
- Network: ANN (TV Asahi)
- Release: March 6, 2022 – February 26, 2023

Related
- Kikai Sentai Zenkaiger; Ohsama Sentai King-Ohger

Avataro Sentai Donbrothers (暴太郎戦隊ドンブラザーズ, Abatarō Sentai Donburazāzu; Avataro Squadron Donbrothers) (Note: The term "Avataro" is a portmanteau of the English word "avatar" and the Japanese given name "Tarō".) (Note: The term "Donbrothers" is a portmanteau of the Japanese onomatopoeia "donburako" (どんぶらこ), a tumbling noise in the Momotarō folktale and the English word "brothers".) is a Japanese tokusatsu television dramedy, the 46th entry in Toei's long-running Super Sentai series and the third produced in the Reiwa era. The series is a semi-sequel to the previous entry, Kikai Sentai Zenkaiger, and premiered one week after its ending, joining Kamen Rider Revice and later, Kamen Rider Geats in the Super Hero Time lineup on TV Asahi on March 6, 2022, and the series was succeeded by Ohsama Sentai King-Ohger. The series is loosely based on the Japanese folktale of Momotarō and the heroes fight monsters whose designs pay tribute to previous installments of the franchise.

Donbrothers began airing in South Korea as Power Rangers Don-Brothers. It was also the first series of the franchise since Abaranger to air officially in mainland China.

== Plot ==
A man called Jin Momoi finds a baby inside a peach-shaped capsule whom he names Taro and raises. 21 years later, mysterious monsters called the Hitotsuki begin appearing when humans overcome with their inner desires are taken over by the spirits infused with powers related to the Super Sentai of the past. Taro, and four other individuals selected by Jin; Shinichi Saruhara, a smart but eccentric young man, Haruka Kitou, a high schooler manga artist, Tsubasa Inuzuka, a wanted fugitive, and Tsuyoshi Kijino, an ordinary salaryman; begin fighting the Hitotsuki and saving their hosts as the Donbrothers. They are later joined by Jiro Momotani, who was also found in a capsule as a baby and raised in a rural area, whose dream is to become a hero.

Also standing in their way are the Nouto, elusive and ruthless individuals from a higher plane of existence who stop the Hitotsuki by sealing their hosts in another dimension, unlike the Donbrothers, who use their powers to rescue them, Don Murasame, a mysterious warrior sent to fight them, and the Juto, strange and powerful creatures who are a threat to both humans and the Nouto. The Donbrothers also count on the help of Kaito Goshikida, the owner of the coffee shop Donbura who transforms into Zenkaizer Black, and Jin, who is trapped in a virtual prison and occasionally offers them advice.

== Episodes ==
No.	English title Original Japanese title	Directed by	Written by	Original release date
1	"Avataro"; Transliteration: "Abatarō" (Japanese: あばたろう)	Ryuta Tasaki	Toshiki Inoue	March 6, 2022
2	"Big Peach, Small Peach"; Transliteration: "Ōmomo, Komomo" (Japanese: おおもも、こもも)	Ryuta Tasaki	Toshiki Inoue	March 13, 2022
3	"The Light Thief"; Transliteration: "Akari Dorobō" (Japanese: あかりどろぼう)	Shojiro Nakazawa	Toshiki Inoue	March 20, 2022
4	"The Onigiri Demon"; Transliteration: "Onigiri no Oni" (Japanese: おにぎりのおに)	Shojiro Nakazawa	Toshiki Inoue	March 27, 2022
5	"The Holed-Up Dog"; Transliteration: "Tatekomotta Inu" (Japanese: たてこもったイヌ)	Katsuya Watanabe	Toshiki Inoue	April 3, 2022
6	"The Pheasant's Short-Lived Glory"; Transliteration: "Kiji Mikkatenka" (Japanese: キジみっかてんか)	Katsuya Watanabe	Toshiki Inoue	April 10, 2022
7	"A Group of Teachers"; Transliteration: "Sensei no Mure" (Japanese: せんせいのむれ)	Hiroyuki Katō	Toshiki Inoue	April 17, 2022
8	"A Long-Haired Captive"; Transliteration: "Ronge no Toriko" (Japanese: ろんげのとりこ)	Hiroyuki Katō	Toshiki Inoue	April 24, 2022
9	"Worn-Out Taro and Robotaro"; Transliteration: "Borotarō to Robotarō" (Japanese: ぼろたろうとロボタロウ)	Ryuta Tasaki	Toshiki Inoue	May 1, 2022
10	"The Rainbow the Oni Saw"; Transliteration: "Oni ga Mita Niji" (Japanese: オニがみたにじ)	Ryuta Tasaki	Toshiki Inoue	May 8, 2022
11	"The Dog Gets Sick"; Transliteration: "Inu no Kakuran" (Japanese: イヌのかくらん)	Kyohei Yamaguchi	Toshiki Inoue	May 15, 2022
12	"The Moon Is a Liar"; Transliteration: "Tsuki wa Usotsuki" (Japanese: つきはウソつき)	Kyohei Yamaguchi	Toshiki Inoue	May 22, 2022
13	"Farewell, Taro"; Transliteration: "Sayonara Tarō" (Japanese: さよならタロウ)	Katsuya Watanabe	Toshiki Inoue	May 29, 2022
14	"Jiro the Substitute"; Transliteration: "Migawari Jirō" (Japanese: みがわりジロウ)	Katsuya Watanabe	Toshiki Inoue	June 5, 2022
15	"Welcome Back, Taro"; Transliteration: "Okaeri Tarō" (Japanese: おかえりタロウ)	Katsuya Watanabe	Toshiki Inoue	June 12, 2022
16	"The Dark Side Switch"; Transliteration: "Yami Ochi Suitchi" (Japanese: やみおちスイッチ)	Hiroyuki Katō	Toshiki Inoue	June 19, 2022
17	"Light and Tsubasa"; Transliteration: "Hikari to Tsubasa" (Japanese: ひかりとつばさ)	Hiroyuki Katō	Toshiki Inoue	June 26, 2022
18	"A Jaws Strike"; Transliteration: "Jōzu na Ippon" (Japanese: ジョーズないっぽん)	Satoshi Morota	Toshiki Inoue	July 3, 2022
19	"Hello Ghost"; Transliteration: "Moshimoshi Yūrei" (Japanese: もしもしユーレイ)	Satoshi Morota	Toshiki Inoue	July 10, 2022
20	"Nose in the Air Elegy"; Transliteration: "Hanataka Erejii" (Japanese: はなたかえれじい)	Kyohei Yamaguchi	Toshiki Inoue	July 17, 2022
21	"Extreme Way of the Ramen"; Transliteration: "Goku Rāmen-dō" (Japanese: ごくラーメンどう)	Kyohei Yamaguchi	Toshiki Inoue	July 24, 2022
22	"Hellish Road of Manga"; Transliteration: "Jigoku Manga Michi" (Japanese: じごくマンガみち)	Katsuya Watanabe	Toshiki Inoue	July 31, 2022
23	"The Dog Becomes a Dog"; Transliteration: "Inu, Inu ni Naru" (Japanese: イヌ、いぬになる)	Katsuya Watanabe	Toshiki Inoue	August 7, 2022
24	"An Ensemble Son"; Transliteration: "Musuko Ni'ninbaori" (Japanese: むすこ、ににんばおり)	Hiroyuki Katō	Toshiki Inoue	August 14, 2022
25	"Hero-Worker"; Transliteration: "Hīrō Shigoto'nin" (Japanese: ヒーローしごとにん)	Hiroyuki Katō	Toshiki Inoue	August 21, 2022
26	"Hasty Finale"; Transliteration: "Fināre Isamiashi" (Japanese: フィナーレいさみあし)	Kazuyuki Chatani	Saburo Yatsude	August 28, 2022
27	"A Serious Duel"; Transliteration: "Kettō Maji Maji" (Japanese: けっとうマジマジ)	Ryuta Tasaki	Toshiki Inoue	September 4, 2022
28	"Secret's Secret"; Transliteration: "Himitsu no Himitsu" (Japanese: ひみつのヒミツ)	Ryuta Tasaki	Toshiki Inoue	September 11, 2022
29	"Mourning and Murasame"; Transliteration: "Tomurai to Murasame" (Japanese: とむらいとムラサメ)	Satoshi Morota	Toshiki Inoue	September 18, 2022
30	"Juto Hunters"; Transliteration: "Jūto no Karyūdo" (Japanese: ジュートのかりゅうど)	Satoshi Morota	Toshiki Inoue	September 25, 2022
31	"The Dog Unmasked"; Transliteration: "Kao Bare Wanwan" (Japanese: かおバレわんわん)	Kyohei Yamaguchi	Toshiki Inoue	October 2, 2022
32	"Duel Part 2"; Transliteration: "Kettō Sono Ni" (Japanese: けっとうソノ２)	Kyohei Yamaguchi	Toshiki Inoue	October 9, 2022
33	"The Wasshoi Bird"; Transliteration: "Wasshoi na Tori" (Japanese: ワッショイなとり)	Hiroyuki Katō	Toshiki Inoue	October 16, 2022
34	"Natsumi Meets Me"; Transliteration: "Natsumi Mītsu Mī" (Japanese: なつみミーツミー)	Hiroyuki Katō	Toshiki Inoue	October 23, 2022
35	"Origami Song"; Transliteration: "Origami no Uta" (Japanese: おりがみのうた)	Ryuta Tasaki	Toshiki Inoue	October 30, 2022
36	"Dog-Dog Battle"; Transliteration: "Inu Inu Gassen" (Japanese: イヌイヌがっせん)	Ryuta Tasaki	Toshiki Inoue	November 13, 2022
37	"I, Ni, Za, and Shi"; Transliteration: "I to Ni to Za to Shi" (Japanese: イとニとザとシ)	Satoshi Morota	Toshiki Inoue	November 20, 2022
38	"Nonsensical Cooking"; Transliteration: "Chinpunkan Kukkingu" (Japanese: ちんぷんかんクッキング)	Satoshi Morota	Toshiki Inoue	November 27, 2022
39	"Unexpected Button Pressing"; Transliteration: "Tana kara Botan Pochi" (Japanese: たなからボタンぽち)	Kyohei Yamaguchi	Toshiki Inoue	December 4, 2022
40	"A Dangerous Riding Companion"; Transliteration: "Kiken na Ainori" (Japanese: キケンなあいのり)	Kyohei Yamaguchi	Toshiki Inoue	December 11, 2022
41	"Santa Struggling"; Transliteration: "Santa Kurō Suru" (Japanese: サンタくろうする)	Katsuya Watanabe	Toshiki Inoue	December 18, 2022
42	"Off-Putting Family"; Transliteration: "Donbiki Kazoku" (Japanese: ドンびきかぞく)	Katsuya Watanabe	Toshiki Inoue	December 25, 2022
43	"Time-Traveling Mysteries"; Transliteration: "Toki Kake Nazo Kake" (Japanese: トキかけナゾかけ)	Ryuta Tasaki	Toshiki Inoue	January 8, 2023
44	"White Revealed, Black Revealed"; Transliteration: "Shiro Bare, Kuro Bare" (Japanese: しろバレ、くろバレ)	Ryuta Tasaki	Toshiki Inoue	January 15, 2023
45	"Kaka Village, Gaga Village"; Transliteration: "Kaka-mura Gaga-mura" (Japanese: カカむらガガむら)	Hiroyuki Katō	Toshiki Inoue	January 22, 2023
46	"A Natsumi Night's Dream"; Transliteration: "Natsumi no Yo no Yume" (Japanese: なつみのよのゆめ)	Hiroyuki Katō	Toshiki Inoue	January 29, 2023
47	"Don-Nou Meeting"; Transliteration: "Don'nō Kaigi" (Japanese: ドンノーかいぎ)	Satoshi Morota	Toshiki Inoue	February 5, 2023
48	"9 Donbros"; Transliteration: "Kyū-nin no Donbura" (Japanese: 9にんのドンブラ)	Satoshi Morota	Toshiki Inoue	February 12, 2023
49	"Last Memories"; Transliteration: "Saigo no Omoide" (Japanese: さいごのおもいで)	Ryuta Tasaki	Toshiki Inoue	February 19, 2023
50 (Final)	"We Have Made a Bond"; Transliteration: "En ga Dekita na" (Japanese: えんができたな)	Ryuta Tasaki	Toshiki Inoue	February 26, 2023

== Production ==
The trademark for the series was filed by Toei Company on October 18, 2021, while the cast and staff was officially announced on February 9, 2022, with Toshiki Inoue as main writer.

Don Momotaro, one of the main protagonists, first appeared in episode 42 of Zenkaiger as a mean of connecting both series. Two members of the team have inhuman proportions while transformed and are animated with computer graphics. The series is the first in the franchise to make use of on-set virtual production.

=== Impact of the COVID-19 pandemic ===
Haruka Kitou's actress, Kohaku Shida, tested positive for COVID-19 on July 27, 2022, and recovered on August 9, 2022.

== Films & Specials ==
=== Theatrical ===
==== New First Love Hero ====
Avataro Sentai Donbrothers the Movie: New First Love Hero (暴太郎戦隊ドンブラザーズ THE MOVIE 新・初恋ヒーロー, Abatarō Sentai Donburazāzu Za Mūbī Shin Hatsukoi Hīrō) is a film released in Japanese theaters on July 22, 2022, double-billed with the film for Kamen Rider Revice the Movie: Battle Familia. Actors Wakako Shimazaki, Nobuo Kyo, and Rika Kishida guest-starred as Reiko Saegusa, Director Kuroiwa, and an unnamed recipient respectively. The events of the film take place between episodes 20 and 21. This film is a tribute to Ninpu Sentai Hurricaneger.

=== Special episodes ===
- Avataro Sentai Donbrothers Meets Kamen Rider Den-O: Aim! Don-O (暴太郎戦隊ドンブラザーズmeets仮面ライダー電王 目指せ！ドン王, Abatarō Sentai Donburazāzu Mītsu Kamen Raidā Den'ō Mezase! Don'ō): A three-episode web-exclusive short special released on the Bandai Official, TV Asahi Super Hero Time, and Toei Tokusatsu YouTube Official YouTube channels on March 1, 2022, containing a series of skits starring Don Momotaro and Kamen Rider Den-O. Toshihiko Seki reprised his voice role as Kamen Rider Den-O Sword Form.
1. Let's Eat (たべよう, Tabeyō)
2. Let's Use (つかおう, Tsukaō)
3. Breakfast (あさめし, Asameshi)
- Avataro Sentai Donbrothers Meets Senpaiger (暴太郎戦隊ドンブラザーズmeetsセンパイジャー, Abatarō Sentai Donburazāzu Mītsu Senpaijā): A web-exclusive short special released on the Bandai Official, TV Asahi Super Hero Time, and Toei Tokusatsu YouTube Official YouTube channels on March 9, 2022. It shows Don Momotaro using his powers to Avatar Change into eleven past Red Sentai from Kaizoku Sentai Gokaiger to Mashin Sentai Kiramager and Zenkaizer from Kikai Sentai Zenkaiger. The shorts were released to promote the then-upcoming crossover film between Zenkaiger and Kiramager, which starred the featured past Red Sentai warriors as a tribute to Senpaigers.
- Avataro Sentai Donbrothers Spin-Off: This Is the Donbrothers' Roll Call! The True Avataro!? (暴太郎戦隊ドンブラザーズ スピンオフ コレがドンブラザーズの名乗りだ！暴太郎のホントの姿！？, Abatarō Sentai Donburazāzu Supin Ofu Kore ga Donburazāzu no Nanori da! Abatarō no Honto no Sugata!?): A web-exclusive short special released on the Bandai Official, TV Asahi Super Hero Time, and Toei Tokusatsu YouTube Official YouTube channels on March 30, 2022.
- Ninpu Sentai Hurricanger With Donbrothers (忍風戦隊ハリケンジャーwithドンブラザーズ, Ninpū Sentai Harikenjā Wizu Donburazāzu): A web-exclusive special released on Toei Tokusatsu Fan Club on December 25, 2022, featuring the Donbrothers teaming up with the Hurricangers as part of the celebrations for the 20th anniversary of Ninpu Sentai Hurricanger with Shun Shioya, Nao Nagasawa, and Kōhei Yamamoto reprising their respective roles.
- Bakuryū Sentai Abaranger With Donbrothers (爆竜戦隊アバレンジャーwithドンブラザーズ, Bakuryū Sentai Abarenjā Wizu Donburazāzu): A web-exclusive special released on Toei Tokusatsu Fan Club on August 27, 2023, featuring the Donbrothers teaming up with the Abarangers as part of the celebrations for the 20th anniversary of Bakuryū Sentai Abaranger with Koichiro Nishi, Sho Tomita, and Michi Nishijima reprising their respective roles.
- Avataro Sentai Donbrothers vs. Avataro Sentai Donburies (暴太郎戦隊ドンブラザーズVS暴太郎戦隊ドンブリーズ, Abatarō Sentai Donburazāzu Tai Abatarō Sentai Donburīzu): A web-exclusive special released on Toei Tokusatsu Fan Club on November 5, 2023.

=== V-Cinema ===
==== Donbrothers vs. Zenkaiger ====
Avataro Sentai Donbrothers vs. Zenkaiger (暴太郎戦隊ドンブラザーズVSゼンカイジャー, Abatarō Sentai Donburazāzu Tai Zenkaijā) is a V-Cinema release that features a crossover between Donbrothers and Kikai Sentai Zenkaiger. The V-Cinema had a limited theatrical release on May 3, 2023, followed by its DVD and Blu-ray release later on September 27, 2023. This film is divided into three acts, focusing on the Donbrothers and Zenkaigers after their respective series, before uniting in the final act. The events of the V-Cinema take place a year after the final episode of the series.

==== King-Ohger vs. Donbrothers ====
Ohsama Sentai King-Ohger vs. Donbrothers (王様戦隊キングオージャーVSドンブラザーズ, Ōsama Sentai Kinguōjā Tai Donburazāzu) is a V-Cinema release that features a crossover between Donbrothers and Ohsama Sentai King-Ohger. The V-Cinema had a limited theatrical release on April 26, 2024, double-billed with Ohsama Sentai King-Ohger vs. Kyoryuger, and followed by its DVD and Blu-ray release on October 9, 2024.

== Novel ==
Novel: Avataro Sentai Donbrothers (小説 暴太郎戦隊ドンブラザーズ, Shōsetsu Abatarō Sentai Donburazāzu) is a novel written by Kenji Konuta, supervised by Toshiki Inoue and scheduled to be released on December 21, 2026.

== Cast ==
- Taro Momoi (桃井 タロウ, Momoi Tarō): Kouhei Higuchi (樋口 幸平, Higuchi Kōhei)
- Shinichi Saruhara (猿原 真一, Saruhara Shin'ichi): Yuuki Beppu (別府 由来, Beppu Yūki)
- Haruka Kitou (鬼頭 はるか, Kitō Haruka): Kohaku Shida (志田 こはく, Shida Kohaku)
- Tsubasa Inuzuka (犬塚 翼, Inuzuka Tsubasa): Totaro (柊太朗, Tōtarō)
- Tsuyoshi Kijino (雉野 つよし, Kijino Tsuyoshi): Hirofumi Suzuki (鈴木 浩文, Suzuki Hirofumi)
- Jiro Momotani (桃谷 ジロウ, Momotani Jirō): Raizou Ishikawa (石川 雷蔵, Ishikawa Raizō)
- Kaito Goshikida (五色田 介人, Goshikida Kaito): Kiita Komagine (駒木根 葵汰, Komagine Kiita)
- Sonoi (ソノイ): Yuya Tominaga (富永 勇也, Tominaga Yūya)
- Sononi (ソノニ): Amisa Miyazaki (宮崎 あみさ, Miyazaki Amisa)
- Sonoza (ソノザ): Shinnosuke Takahashi (タカハシ シンノスケ, Takahashi Shin'nosuke)
- Sonoshi (ソノシ): Tomoki Hirose (廣瀬 智紀, Hirose Tomoki)
- Sonogo (ソノゴ): Mana Takai (高井 真菜, Takai Mana)
- Sonoroku (ソノロク): Shin Koyanagi (小柳 心, Koyanagi Shin)
- Miho Kijino (雉野 みほ, Kijino Miho), Natsumi Kuramochi (倉持 夏美, Kuramochi Natsumi): (Note: Natsumi Kuramochi is credited by first name only.) Momoko Arata (新田 桃子, Arata Momoko)
- Yuriko Kitou (鬼頭 ゆり子, Kitō Yuriko): Hitomi Miwa (三輪 ひとみ, Miwa Hitomi)
- Kenji Sayama (狭山 健児, Sayama Kenji): (Note: Kenji Sayama is credited in episode 2 as Detective.) Ryoji Sugimoto (杉本 凌士, Sugimoto Ryōji)
- Manager Yamada (山田部長, Yamada-buchō): (Note: Manager Yamada is credited as Manager until episode 24.) Kohtaro Taki (滝 晃太朗, Taki Kōtarō)
- Ishikawa (石川): (Note: Ishikawa, Takenaka, and Kiriyama are credited as Co-Workers.) Takahito Ueda (植田 敬仁, Ueda Takahito)
- Takenaka (竹中): Akira Takeuchi (竹内 啓, Takeuchi Akira)
- Kiriyama (桐山): Ryosuke Yusa (遊佐 亮介, Yusa Ryōsuke)
- Jin Momoi (桃井 陣, Momoi Jin): Soko Wada (和田 聰宏, Wada Sōkō)

=== Voice cast ===
- Don Murasame (ドンムラサメ): Ayumu Murase (村瀬 歩, Murase Ayumu)
- Mother (マザー, Mazā): Mamiko Noto (能登 麻美子, Noto Mamiko)
- Donbrothers Equipment, Ninjark Sword (ニンジャークソード, Ninjāku Sōdo): Daiki Hamano (濱野 大輝, Hamano Daiki)
- Don Doragoku/Don Torabolt Equipment: Romi Park (朴 璐美, Paku Romi)

=== Guest cast ===
- Haruo Suzuki (鈴木 春男, Suzuki Haruo; 1): Seiya (せいや)
- Hitoshi Hanamura (花村 ひとし, Hanamura Hitoshi; 1, 10, 19): Kyoya Honda (本田 響矢, Honda Kyōya)
- Dandy (6): Tomohito Wakizaki (脇崎 智史, Wakizaki Tomohito)
- Man (8): Satoru Soma (相馬 理, Sōma Satoru)
- Makoto Tanabe (田辺 誠, Tanabe Makoto; 17): Yuya Hirata (平田 雄也, Hirata Yūya)
- Reiko Saegusa (三枝 玲子, Saegusa Reiko; Voice; 20): Wakako Shimazaki (島崎 和歌子, Shimazaki Wakako)
- Tetsu Utsunomiya (宇都宮 テツ, Utsunomiya Tetsu; 21): Seikō Senoo (妹尾 青洸, Senoo Seikō)
- Kentarō Gōda (豪田 健太郎, Gōda Kentarō; 22): (Note: Kentarō Gōda is credited by last name only.) Tet Wada (テット・ワダ, Tetto Wada)
- Butler (22): Katsumi Nakayama (中山 克己, Nakayama Katsumi)
- Mizuho Ijuin (伊集院 瑞穂, Ijūin Mizuho; 28): Nanaha Itose (糸瀬 七葉, Itose Nanaha)
- Takeo Aota (青田 武夫, Aota Takeo; 28): Yoshito Momiki (籾木 芳仁, Momiki Yoshito)
- Oden cart owner (34, 37–38, 49–50): Hiroo Otaka (大高 洋夫, Ōtaka Hiroo)
- Mutō (武藤; 40): (Note: Mutō is credited as Instructor Mutō.) Hiroyuki Matsumoto (松本 博之, Matsumoto Hiroyuki)
- Santa Claus (41): (Note: Santa Claus is credited as Real Santa.) Yukijirō Hotaru (螢 雪次朗, Hotaru Yukijirō)
- Sonona (ソノナ; 49–50): Yuka Motohashi (本橋 由香, Motohashi Yuka)
- Sonoya (ソノヤ; 49–50): Kōhei Murakami (村上 幸平, Murakami Kōhei)
- President of Jōdansha (50): Toshiki Inoue (井上 敏樹, Inoue Toshiki)

== Songs ==
Opening theme

- "Ore koso Only One" (俺こそオンリーワン, Ore koso Onrī Wan; lit. 'I Am Only One')
  - Lyrics: Neko Oikawa (及川 眠子, Oikawa Neko)
  - Composition & Arrangement: Fuwari (フワリ)
  - Artist: Win Morisaki (森崎 ウィン, Morisaki Win)

Ending theme

- "Don't Boo! Donbrothers" (Don't Boo！ドンブラザーズ, Donto Bū! Donburazāzu)
  - Lyrics: Shio Watanabe (渡部 紫緒, Watanabe Shio)
  - Composition & Arrangement: Go Sakabe (坂部 剛, Sakabe Gō)
  - Artist: Win Morisaki

== Reception ==
In an interview with series producer Shinichiro Shirakura, anime mecha designer Masami Ōbari praises the Donbrothers's mecha Don Onitaijin for its detailed proportions and its design, which he considered as an improvement over the past Sentai mechas. Shirakura added that the design of Don Onitaijin was decided as a sort of "revenge" for Zenkaiger's failed attempt to keep up with Bandai's toy release schedule. Ōbari had also hoped to participate in the production of Donbrothers in the future as a storyboard artist.
