= Yujiro Shirakawa =

Japanese actor and rikishi (born 1976)

- 白川 裕二郎
- Born: December 11, 1976 (age 49); Kōhoku-ku, Yokohama, Kanagawa Prefecture, Japan
- Occupations: Actor, Singer
- Years active: 2002 -
- Height: 185 cm (73 in)

Yujiro Shirakawa (白川 裕二郎, Shirakawa Yūjirō; born December 11, 1976, in Kōhoku-ku, Yokohama, Kanagawa Prefecture, Japan) is a Japanese actor and singer who is represented by the talent agency, G.P.R.

== Biography ==
Tsunanofuji Yūjiro
Personal information
- Native name: 綱ノ富士 裕二郎
- Height: 1.83 m (6 ft 0 in)
- Weight: 82 kg (181 lb)

Sport
- Sport: Sumo
- Retired: September, 1996
- Heya: Asahiyama
- Record: 16-12-14
- Debut: November 1995
- Highest rank: Jonidan (May, 1996)

Shirakawa began his public career as a professional sumo wrestler (rikishi). He decided to become a wrestler because he regularly watched sumo on TV with his parents and admired popular wrestlers of the time like Chiyonofuji. He enrolled in Asahiyama stable and began his wrestling career by first wrestling under his real name of Shirakawa (白川) and then adopted the shikona, or ring name, Tsunanofuji (綱ノ富士), to pay homage to Chiyonofuji and to recall his dream of reaching the top of sumo. At the time, he got early successes but recalls he never gained weight, "no matter how much [he] ate". After a while, Shirakawa aggravated back problems that were already latent. He began to feel pain so severe that he couldn't even put on his mawashi without suffering. Since he could no longer fight or even train, he decided to retire in September 1996 (intai).

In 2002, Shirakawa debuted in Ninpu Sentai Hurricanger as Ikkou Kasumi / Kabuto Raiger. He contested with Shun Shioya which became the "Handsome Hero Boom". Shirakawa played a big brother in the series, but he actually has an older sister.

He was also active in stage as an actor. He is also the main vocal of the chorus group Junretsu.

Shirakawa, with Kohei Yamamoto, Nobuo Kyo, Ryuichiro Nishioka, and Yūsuke Tomoi, became a member of the clothes brand Anunnaki.

== Filmography ==
=== TV series ===
Year	Title	Role	Network	Notes
2002	Ninpu Sentai Hurricanger	Ikkou Kasumi / Kabuto Raiger	TV Asahi	
2003	Tenbatsu-ya Kurenai Yami no Shimatsu Jō	Chinmoku (Samari) no Ichimatsu	TV Asahi	
2003	17-Sai Natsu	Akira	Asahi Broadcasting Corporation	
2004	Botan to Bara	Masaya Kashiwagi	Fuji TV	
2004	Damenari	Tatsumi Kuroyama	Yomimuri TV	
2006	Gekitō! Idol Yobikō	Shinya Hasaki	Kyoto Broadcasting	
2006	Kōmyō ga Tsuji	Hirano Nagayasu	NHK	Taiga drama
2006	Keijirō Engawa Nikki 3		NHK General TV	

=== Films ===
Year	Title	Role	Notes
2002	Ninpu Sentai Hurricanger: Shushutto the Movie	Ikkou Kasumi / Kabuto Raiger	
2004	Atarashī Kaze	Ison no Sshi	
2004	Twilight File / Gekkō		
2006	Chōja Bandzuke ni Idonda Otoko Fūunji		
2013	Ninpu Sentai Hurricanger: 10 YEARS AFTER	Ikkou Kasumi / Kabuto Raiger	
2021	JUNretsuger	JUNRed	

== Sumo career record ==
Tsunanofuji Yūjiro
Year	January Hatsu basho, Tokyo	March Haru basho, Osaka	May Natsu basho, Tokyo	July Nagoya basho, Nagoya	September Aki basho, Tokyo	November Kyūshū basho, Fukuoka
1995	x	x	x	x	(Maezumo)	West Jonokuchi #53; 4–3
1996	West Jonokuchi #13; 5–2	East Jonidan #131; 4–3	East Jonidan #99; 3–4	East Jonidan #127; Sat out due to injury 0–0–7	West Jonokuchi #9; Retired; 0–0–7	x
Record given as wins–losses–absences Top division champion Top division runner-up Retired Lower divisions Non-participation Sanshō key: F=Fighting spirit; O=Outstanding performance; T=Technique Also shown: ★=Kinboshi; P=Playoff(s); Divisions: Makuuchi — Jūryō — Makushita — Sandanme — Jonidan — Jonokuchi Makuuchi ranks: Yokozuna — Ōzeki — Sekiwake — Komusubi — Maegashira
