= Amisa Miyazaki =

Japanese actress and model (born 2002)

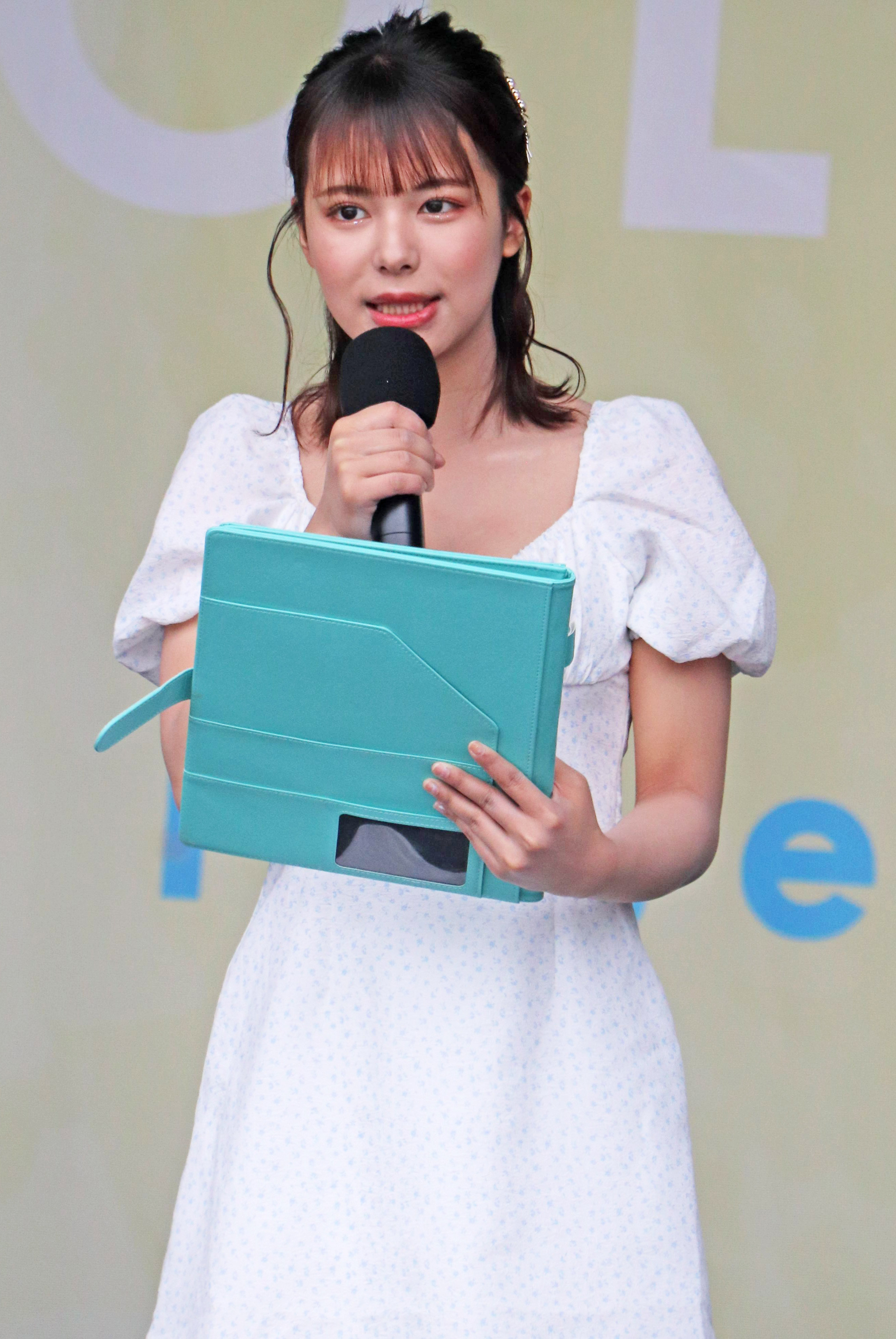
- Miyazaki in April 2023
- Born: October 28, 2002 (age 23); Sumida, Tokyo, Japan
- Occupations: Actress; model
- Years active: 2019–present
- Agent: Plan-D
- Height: 149 cm (4 ft 11 in)
- Musical career
- Genre: J-pop
- Instrument: Vocals
- Years active: 2019–2023
- Formerly of: LoveLink; Mystear

Japanese name
- Kanji: 宮崎 あみさ
- Hiragana: みやざき あみさ
Transcriptions
- Romanization: Miyazaki Amisa

Amisa Miyazaki (宮崎 あみさ(みやざき あみさ), Miyazaki Amisa; born October 28, 2002) is a Japanese model, actress, and former singer. She is a former member of the idol girl group's LoveLink (2019–2020) and Mystear (2020–2023).

== Early life ==
Amisa Miyazaki was born on October 28, 2002, in Sumida, Tokyo, Japan. She is a hāfu, as her mother is from Myanmar and her father is from Japan. Her siblings include an older sister, her twin brother, and a younger sister.

Due to her parents' work, she and her siblings lived in an area called Ngapali in the Rakhine state of Myanmar when she was young. They went back and forth and lived there for two years with their maternal grandmother, during which she attended middle school there. Although she can speak Burmese at that time, she attended a Japanese school there.

== Career ==
While Miyazaki was working part-time at a café, she was encouraged by a friend who also worked there to become a member of an upcoming girl group. She made her debut in 2019 as a member of the idol girl group LoveLink. The group disbanded a year later on February 17, 2020, and she would then debut on February 24, 2020, as a member of the idol group Mystear from the same agency.

In April 2020, She became affiliated with the modelling agency Coprte inc. and was selected as a finalist of that year's edition of Weekly Young Jump. Besides being an idol singer, she is also working in gravure modelling.

On January 25, 2022, she announced that she would go on hiatus from her idol activities after a live performance at Ebisu LIQUIDROOM that took place on February 27, 2022, in order to "focus on [her] individual entertainment activities." On February 9 of the same year, it was announced that Miyazaki would make her television debut appearing in a regular supporting role as Sononi, an evil heroine, in the special effects TV drama Avataro Sentai Donbrothers, which was broadcast on March 6 of that year.

Miyazaki released her first photo book, "1920," on March 20, 2023. On October 23, she "graduated" from Mystear to be able to focus more on her acting career. She left Just Productions at the end of March 2025 and joined Plan-D on August 1 of the same year.

== Personal life ==
Miyazaki used to live in Myanmar with her maternal grandparents when she was younger, and has stated that even though she can still understand the Burmese language, she is not as fluent anymore.

== Filmography ==
=== Film ===
| Year | Title | Role | Notes | Ref(s) |
|---|---|---|---|---|
| 2022 | Avataro Sentai Donbrothers The Movie: New First Love Hero | Sononi | | |
| 2023 | Avataro Sentai Donbrothers vs. Zenkaiger | Sononi | | |
| 2024 | Ohsama Sentai King-Ohger vs. Donbrothers | Sononi | | |
| 2024 | Dull Colored Chocolatville Biennale | Nanami Liboshi | | |

=== Television ===
| Year | Title | Role | Notes | Ref(s) |
|---|---|---|---|---|
| 2022–23 | Avataro Sentai Donbrothers | Sononi | | |
| 2023 | Avataro Sentai Donbrothers vs. Avataro Sentai Donburies | Sononi | Web series | |
| 2024 | Tokusou Sentai Dekaranger with Tombo Ohger | Ten Haretsuki/Deka Pink Sono2 | Web series | |
| 2025 | Betrayal Meals in a Place Like This: Seven Executives Who Bring a Storm | Cameo | Episode 5 | |
| 2026 | First Cry | May To | Episode 2 | |

=== Radio show ===
| Year | Title | Network | Notes | Ref |
|---|---|---|---|---|
| 2022 | Amisano Oyashumi Radio | InterFM | Host | |

== Stage ==
=== Theater ===
| Year | Title | Role | Ref(s) |
|---|---|---|---|
| 2023 | Tearmoon Empire | Mia Luna Tearmoon | |
| 2024 | Saga The Stage: Bonds of Rebirth | Rock Bouquet | |
| 2025 | Man in Love | | |
| 2025 | Secret of Mana 3: Trials of Mana The Stage | Charlotte | |

== Photobook ==
- "1920" (March 20, 2023, Shueisha) ISBN 978-4087901054
