= Ninpuu Sentai Hurricaneger =

26th season of the Super Sentai series

- Genre: Tokusatsu; Superhero fiction; Action adventure; Science fantasy; Black comedy
- Created by: Saburo Yatsude
- Developed by: Junichi Miyashita
- Directed by: Katsuya Watanabe
- Starring: Shun Shioya; Nao Nagasawa; Kōhei Yamamoto; Yujiro Shirakawa; Nobuo Kyo; Azusa Yamamoto; Mio Fukuzumi; Ken Nishida; Shoko Takada
- Voices of: Taiki Matsuno
- Narrated by: Hironori Miyata
- Music by: Kazunori Miyake
- Opening theme: "Hurricaneger Sanjō!" by Hideaki Takatori
- Ending theme: "Ima Kaze no Naka de" by Hironobu Kageyama
- Country of origin: Japan
- No. of episodes: 51 (list of episodes)

Production
- Producers: Saeko Matsuda (TV Asahi); Jun Hikasa; Hideaki Tsukada (Toei); Kōichi Yada (Toei Agency)
- Production location: Tokyo, Japan (Greater Tokyo Area)
- Running time: 24–25 minutes (per episode)
- Production companies: TV Asahi; Toei Company; Toei Advertising

Original release
- Network: ANN (TV Asahi)
- Release: February 17, 2002 – February 9, 2003

Related
- Hyakujuu Sentai Gaoranger; Bakuryū Sentai Abaranger

Ninpuu Sentai Hurricaneger (忍風戦隊ハリケンジャー, Ninpū Sentai Harikenjā; Wind Ninja Squadron Hurricaneger) (Note: Ninpū (忍風) literally translates as "Wind Ninja". It is also a play on the word ninpō (忍法; "ninja art").) is a Japanese Tokusatsu television show and Toei's 26th production of the Super Sentai metaseries. After Toei filed the trademark for the series on November 22, 2001, it aired from February 17, 2002, to February 9, 2003, replacing Hyakujuu Sentai Gaoranger, and was replaced by Bakuryū Sentai Abaranger. Its footage was used in the American series Power Rangers Ninja Storm (the end credits listed the show as titled Hurricane Rangers).

On April 1, 2013, Shun Shioya, Nao Nagasawa, Kohei Yamamoto, Yujiro Shirakawa, and Nobuo Kyo, who played Hurricane Red, Hurricane Blue, Hurricane Yellow, Kabuto Raiger, and Kuwaga Raiger, respectively, announced that a tenth-anniversary V-Cinema release called Ninpuu Sentai Hurricaneger: 10 Years After would be produced. This is the first time a movie has been made commemorating the anniversary of a single Sentai series. The movie is a direct to DVD and Blu-ray release. Shout! Factory released Ninpuu Sentai Hurricaneger: The Complete Series in North America on March 26, 2019. This is the twelfth Super Sentai series to be released in North America. It aired alongside Kamen Rider Ryuki.

Hurricaneger is the first Super Sentai series to officially celebrate its own 20th anniversary, with a V-cinext release for this occasion which debuted in 2022.

== Plot ==
Three misfit pupils of the Hayate-Style Ninja School, who are given a rigorous training regiment by their sensei Mugensai Hinata, are the only survivors when most of their peers are slaughtered during the graduation ceremony by a group of evil space ninjas known as the Jakanja that serve a mysterious power hidden on Earth. Mugensai, who has turned himself into a hamster to evade his pursuers, and his daughter Oboro Hinata recruit the trio to become the legendary Hurricanegers to fight Jakanja. The Hurricanegers are joined by the Gouraigers of the Ikazuchi-Style Ninja School, who were initially their enemies, and later the mysterious Shurikenger who unites the two ninja groups to stop Jakanja from acquiring the mysterious power.

== Characters ==
=== Space Unified Ninja School ===
The cast of Ninpuu Sentai Hurricaneger: 10 Years After. From left to right: Fourth Spear Wendinu, First Spear Furabiijo, Isshu and Ikkou Kasumi, Yosuke Shiina, Nanami Nono, Kota Bito, and Tenkai.

Space Unified Ninja School (宇宙統一忍者流, Uchū Tōitsu Ninja-ryū)

==== Hurricanegers ====
The eponymous Hurricanegers are three ninja students in the 507th class who are the survivors of the Hayate-Style (疾風流, Hayate-ryū) ninja school, Ninpukan (忍風館, Ninpūkan), where they master their school's Super Ninja Art (超忍法, Chō Ninpō) ninjutsu. They represent the Hayate Heart embodying the "Persistence of the Future".

The Hurricanegers transform by utilizing Shinobi Medal (シノビメダル, Shinobi Medaru) coins in conjunction with Hurricane Gyro (ハリケンジャイロ, Hariken Jairo) bracelets. While transformed, each member carries a Hayatemaru (ハヤテ丸) sidearm, which can switch between its ninjatō-like Cut Mode (斬モード, Zan Mōdo) and its rifle-like Shoot Mode (射モード, Sha Mōdo). They also ride Hurricane Winger (ハリケンウインガー, Hariken Uingā) hang gliders for transportation. By combining their personal weapons, they form the Triple Gadget (トリプルガジェット, Toripuru Gajetto), which has three modes that can perform a different finisher depending on which weapon is used as the front piece, to destroy human-sized Jakanja members.

When facing enlarged Jakanja members, the Hurricanegers summon and combine their Shinobi Machine (シノビマシン, Shinobi Mashin) mecha to form a Karakuri Giant (カラクリ巨人, Karakuri Kyojin) known as Senpuujin (旋風神, Senpūjin) via Ninpuu Combination (忍風合体, Ninpū Gattai). Alternatively, it can assume a more agile form known as Senpuujin Hurrier (旋風神ハリアー, Senpūjin Hariā), but only for a duration of one minute.

Yosuke Shiina (椎名 鷹介, Shiina Yōsuke)
The leader of the team, his courageous determination making up for his slow-thinking. Long after the Jakanja's defeat, while aiding the Abarangers and then the Gokaigers, Yosuke became a handyman who travels around the world. During his travels, six months prior to the events of Ninpuu Sentai Hurricaneger: 10 Years After, Yosuke befriends Tenkai and is forced by Bat Ze Runba to attack Space Unified Ninja School branches and steal his teammates' Shinobi Medals. But with his friends' help, Yosuke frees Tenkai and becomes a mentor to the boy.

As the "Air Ninja" (空忍, Sora'nin), Hurricane Red (ハリケンレッド, Hariken Reddo), Yosuke wields the Dry Gun (ドライガン, Dorai Gan), which allows the Triple Gadget's Dry Gadget (ドライガジェット, Dorai Gajetto) mode to shoot a flaming energy ball. He also pilots the Hurricane Hawk (ハリケンホーク, Hariken Hōku) Shinobi Machine, which forms the head of Senpuujin.

While working for Bat Ze Runba, Yosuke becomes the black-colored Hurricane Dark (ハリケンダーク, Hariken Dāku).

Nanami Nono (野乃 七海, Nono Nanami)
A kunoichi who dreams of becoming a popstar, working under the stage name Nana Nono (野乃 ナナ, Nono Nana). After the final battle, aiding the Abarangers, the Boukengers, and the Gokaigers, Nanami became a successful singer of international fame and hopes to be an actress.

As the "Water Ninja" (水忍, Mizu'nin), Hurricane Blue (ハリケンブルー, Hariken Burū), Nanami wields the Sonic Megaphone (ソニックメガホン, Sonikku Megahon), which allows the Triple Gadget's Sonic Gadget (ソニックガジェット, Sonikku Gajetto) mode to fire a bubble of sound waves. She also pilots the Hurricane Dolphin (ハリケンドルフィン, Hariken Dorufin) Shinobi Machine, which forms the right arm of Senpuujin.

Kota Bito (尾藤 吼太, Bitō Kōta)
A firm believer in planning whose friendly nature allows him to work at a daycare center. Long after the Jakanja's defeat, aiding the Abarangers and then the Gokaigers, Kota married and had a daughter named Suzune (鈴音) as well as a son named Riku (陸). Though he attempted to conceal his activities as a ninja from his family, Kota considers telling them the truth after the events of Ninpuu Sentai Hurricaneger: 10 Years After.

As the "Earth Ninja" (陸忍, Oka'nin), Hurricane Yellow (ハリケンイエロー, Hariken Ierō), Kota wields the Quake Hammer (クエイクハンマー, Kueiku Hanmā), which allows the Triple Gadget's Quake Gadget (クエイクガジェット, Kueiku Gajetto) mode to materialize a 100-ton spherical weight. He also pilots the Hurricane Leon (ハリケンレオン, Hariken Reon) Shinobi Machine, which forms the legs, torso, and left arm of Senpuujin.

==== Gouraigers ====
The Lightning Speed Gouraiger (電光石火ゴウライジャー, Denkōsekka Gōraijā) are two brothers who are the surviving students of the Ikazuchi Way (迅雷流, Ikazuchi-ryū) ninja academy, Ikazuchi Gijuku (迅雷義塾), & were originally the enemies of the Hurricanegers who join the Jakanja despite them having wiped out the Ikazuchi Way's Ninja Academy which left the Kasumi brothers as the only survivors. The brothers obtained the forbidden Gouraiger system from their father, Ikki Kasumi (霞 一鬼, Kasumi Ikki), a rogue ninja who abused them. Ikki went against the Ikazuchi Way's wishes to obtain the Evil Will after learning of it during his mission in Egypt and learned of the "Final Secret" at the time of a meteor shower. He went against his school's wishes by creating the Gouraiger system and making his sons kill each other to evoke it while making them believe that rage and hatred would only promote strength. Though they eventually allied themselves with the Hurricanegers, the Kasumi brothers were unable to completely forsake their father's cruel teachings and have a jaded view on life. The two work as construction workers before parting ways after the final battle with the Jakanja. They represent the Ikazuchi Heart embodying the "Bonds of the Past".

The Gouraigers transform by utilizing Shinobi Medals in conjunction with Gourai Changer (ゴウライチェンジャー, Gōrai Chenjā) bracelets. While transformed, each member carries an Ikazuchimaru (イカヅチ丸) sidearm, which can switch between its bō-like Spear Mode (手槍モード, Teyari Mōdo), its shuriken-like Cross Mode (十字の型, Jūji no Kata), and its shield-like Circle Moon Mode (円月の型, Engetsu no Kata). They also ride Bari Thunder (バリサンダー, Bari Sandā) motorcycles for transportation. By combining their personal weapons, they form the Double Gadget (ダブルガジェット, Daburu Gajetto), which can further combine with the Hurricanegers' Triple Gadget to form the Victory Gadget (ビクトリーガジェット, Bikutorī Gajetto), to destroy human-sized Jakanja members. In Bakuryū Sentai Abaranger vs. Hurricaneger, the Hurricanegers and Gouraigers combine their Victory Gadget and the Abarangers' Super Dino Bomber to form the Super Dino Victory (スーパーダイノビクトリー, Sūpā Daino Bikutorī).

When facing enlarged Jakanja members, the Gouraigers summon and combine their Shinobi Machines to form Gouraijin (轟雷神, Gōraijin) via Thunderclap Combination (迅雷合体, Ikazuchi Gattai). Alternatively, it can combine with Senpuujin and a Karakuri Ball (カラクリボール, Karakuri Bōru) combination known as Fuuraimaru (風雷丸, Fūraimaru) to form Gourai Senpuujin (轟雷旋風神, Gōrai Senpūjin) via School Transcendence Wind-Thunder Combination (流派超越風雷合体, Ryūha Chōetsu Fūrai Gattai) as well as ride the Revolver Mammoth (リボルバーマンモス, Riborubā Manmosu) mecha in the Revolver Gourai Senpuujin (リボルバー轟雷旋風神, Riborubā Gōrai Senpūjin) formation.

Ikkou Kasumi (霞 一甲, Kasumi Ikkō)
The older brother of Isshu who originally intended to make Ikazuchi the greatest ninja school using the Evil Will. But he abandoned it and decides to support the Hurricanegers, becoming Yosuke's rival while making a mortal enemy out of Manmaruba when the alien sought revenge against the Kasumi brothers for making a fool out of him. Long after the Jakanja's defeat, aiding the Abarangers prior to becoming estranged from his brother, Ikkou becomes a member of the JunRetsu singing group. During the events of Ninpuu Sentai Hurricaneger: 10 Years After, Ikkou helps Yosuke remember the good they did together before helping him save Tenkai.

As the crimson-colored "Horned Ninja" (角忍, Tsuno'nin), Kabuto Raiger (カブトライジャー, Kabuto Raijā), Ikkou wields the Horn Breaker (ホーンブレイカー, Hōn Bureikā) raygun. He also pilots the Gourai Beetle (ゴウライビートル, Gōrai Bītoru) Shinobi Machine, which forms the upper half of Gouraijin.

Isshu Kasumi (霞 一鍬, Kasumi Isshū)
The younger brother of Ikkou who originally resented his school for staying in the shadows, idolizing his brother and respecting most of his decisions. But he took the fact they were not rebuilding their ninja school personally until he found the resting place of his father's blade, the double-bladed Kiraimaru (鬼雷丸) naginata. Desiring to rebuild the Ikazuchi School, Isshu used the blade with disastrous results. After learning to use the Kiraimaru in a way where his friends would not be harmed, Isshu decides to rebuild the school after Jakanja is defeated. By the events of Ninpuu Sentai Hurricaneger: 10 Years After, having left Ikkou's shadow, Isshu became a lady's man and eventually made peace with his brother.

As the navy blue-colored "Fanged Ninja" (牙忍, Kiba'nin), Kuwaga Raiger (クワガライジャー, Kuwaga Raijā), Isshu wields the Stag Breaker (スタッグブレイカー, Sutaggu Bureikā) claw, which can combine with the Ikazuchimaru to form the Ikazuchi Breaker (イカヅチブレイカー, Ikazuchi Bureikā) naginata. He also pilots the Gourai Stag (ゴウライスタッグ, Gōrai Sutaggu) Shinobi Machine, which forms the lower half of Gouraijin.

==== Shurikenger ====
Shurikenger (シュリケンジャー, Shurikenjā) (Note: A toy of the Shuriken's Bat has "Shurikenger" spelt as "Shuricaneger".) is a moniker utilized by its original user and his successor. As the green-colored "Sky Ninja" (天空忍者, Tenkū Ninja), they utilize the Shuriken Ball (シュリケンボール, Shuriken Bōru) device to transform and wield the Shuriken's Bat (シュリケンズバット, Shurikenzu Batto) sidearm, which can switch between its katana-like Sword Mode (ソードモード, Sōdo Mōdo) and its club-like Bat Mode (バットモード, Batto Mōdo), and the string instrument-like Ninjamisen (ニンジャミセン) handgun, which can combine with one of the team's sidearms to access varying sonic weapon-like Tuning (チューニング, Chūningu) modes. They can also assume Fire Mode (ファイヤーモード, Faiyā Mōdo) by rotating the top of their helmet while removing the weight inhibitor serving as chest armor to increase their physical abilities. In Ninpuu Sentai Hurricaneger: 10 Years After, Shurikenger combines their Ninjamisen and the Hurricanegers and Gouraigers' Victory Gadget to form the Final Gadget (ファイナルガジェット, Fainaru Gajetto).

When facing enlarged Jakanja members, Shurikenger summons and changes their swallow-themed Tenkuujin (天空神, Tenkūjin) Shinobi Machine from its helicopter-like Flight Mode (飛行モード, Hikō Mōdo) to its humanoid Robo Mode (ロボモード, Robo Mōdo) via Soaring Transformation (飛翔変形, Hishō Henkei). Alternatively, it can combine with Senpuujin, Gouraijin, and the Tri-Condor (トライコンドル, Torai Kondoru) Karakuri Ball combination to form Tenrai Senpuujin (天雷旋風神, Tenrai Senpūjin) via Galactic Transcendence Three-God Combination (銀河超越三神合体, Ginga Chōetsu Sanshin Gattai) as well as ride Revolver Mammoth in the Revolver Tenrai Senpuujin (リボルバー天雷旋風神, Riborubā Tenrai Senpūjin) formation.

Shurikenger
The original Shurikenger, also known as the "Man with a Thousand Faces" (千の顔を持つ男, Sen no Kao o Motsu Otoko), was an ex-student of the Hayate-Style's Ninja Academy who became Kagura's personal fighter while renouncing his name and face as he is permanently transformed into his costumed form. A somewhat comical figure, Shurikenger often used broken English phrases including the famous "I am Ninja of Ninja!" and also often poorly mixes both Japanese and English into his sentences. He usually disguises himself as a 'regular' person until he reverts to his true form with the Shuriken Ball when confronted by Jakanja. Though Shurikenger seemed to have died after being mortally wounded by Sandaru and using Tenkuujin to take out Satorakura, he mysteriously reappears to aid his allies and the Abarangers, and is last seen overseeing the Ninningers' progress under the request of Toha Yamaji.

Tenkai (天界)
A mysterious 10-year-old boy who appears exclusively in Ninpuu Sentai Hurricaneger: 10 Years After, taken under Yosuke's wing as a traveling companion six months prior as he lacked any memory of his life beforehand. But upon being kidnapped by Bat Ze Runba, he is revealed to be the embodiment of the Great Force that manifested after the Hurricanegers and Gouraigers defeated Tau Zanto. Though Runba succeeded in awakening the Great Force, Tenkai manages to suppress it and gains the ability to become the new Shurikenger with the resolve to use his powers for good as he becomes Yosuke's apprentice. Unlike his predecessor, though he possesses the same capabilities, Tenkai does not use broken English phrases in his sentences.

=== Allies ===
Mugensai Hinata (日向 無限斎, Hinata Mugensai)
The ninja master of the Ninpuukan ninja school and a master of the animal-change Ninja Art, having turned into a hamster to evade Jakanja's attack on his school yet panicked and mixed up the words in his spell and has been referenced as "Hamster Curator" (ハムスター館長, Hamusutā Kanchō). Despite his form, he can fight and communicated with Kagura before she revealed herself. While Mugensai was temporary restored during the events of Ninpu Sentai Hurricaneger: Shushutto the Movie by Laiina until she left Earth, he regains his humanity in the finale and graduates the Hurricanegers and Gouraigers two months after their battle with Tau Zant.
Oboro Hinata (日向 おぼろ, Hinata Oboro)
Mugensai's scholarly daughter and the director of the Hayate-Style Ninja Arts Laboratory (疾風流忍術研究館, Hayate-ryū Ninjutsu Kenkyū-kan) who provides the Hurricanegers' arsenal, being their senpai due to her being a member of the 487th graduating class. She also invented the robot kuroko that mind-wipe out the ninjas' existence from civilians those who left Hayate-Style to ensure their school's secrecy.
Kagura (覚羅)
A 500-year-old seemingly young woman who is the daughter of a feudal lord who died protecting her before she went into hiding as Gozen (御前様, Gozen-sama) (Note: A Japanese greeting to address a high-ranking person.) with Shurikenger as her protector while some of her descendants become members of the Space Unified Ninja School she established. Kagura's prolonged life is due to the Dark Stone (闇石, Yami Ishi) embedded on her forehead, the item revealed to be the Grieving Bow (嘆きの弓, Nageki no Yumi) which the Earth ninjas' technology is derived from. But Kagura refrains from any form of sadness to maintain the seal placed on the Grieving Bow. After moving in with the Hurricanegers after her location is compromised, Kagura learned of how much the world changed during her solitude while seeing the ninjas as true heroes despite her earlier impressions. But Sandaaru learned of the seal, killing her once it is undone. During the events of Ninpuu Sentai Hurricaneger: 10 Years After, the Hurricanegers meet a leading figure of the Space Unified Ninja School who is a blood relative of Kagura's and was entrusted with Shurikenger's Shinobi Medal before it was stolen.
Yonosuke (鷹乃介, Yōnosuke)
Yosuke's ancestor who appears in Ninpuu Sentai Hurricaneger de Gozaru! Shushutto 20th Anniversary. Similarly to his descendant, he utilizes the Oedo (大江戸, Ōedo) Shinobi Medal in conjunction with a Hurricane Gyro to transform into the kabuki-themed Oedo Hurricane Red (大江戸ハリケンレッド, Ōedo Hariken Reddo).

=== Space-Ninja Group Jakanja ===
The Space-Ninja Group Jakanja (宇宙忍群ジャカンジャ, Uchū Ningun Jakanja) are a ruthless band of alien ninja based in their fortress Parasite Fortress Centipede (寄生要塞センチピード, Kisei Yōsai Senchipīdo). The Jonin (上忍, Jō'nin; High-Ranked Ninja) group known as the Seven Dark Spears (暗黒七本槍, Ankoku Nanahon Yari) consists of three commanders of the Chuunin (中忍, Chū'nin; Middle-Ranked Ninjas) that consist of Jankanja's Space Ninjas (宇宙忍者, Uchū Ninja). Each one leads their own Ninja Corps. Their goal is to bring Earth to ruins to invoke "it" (アレ, Are), the "Evil Force" (邪悪なる意志, Jaakunaru Ishi) that would form in the depths of the ocean before destroying the universe. But when Tau Zanto assumes his ultimate form the Centipede is destroyed in the transformation, Furabiijo and Wendinu are among the survivors that also include the Reverse Seven Spears.

Leader Tau Zant (首領タウ・ザント, Shuryō Tau Zanto)
Jakanja's leader, an Ōmukade-like demon with various faces on his segments who desires the Evil Force's power to wipe out the universe and create a new one he intends to rule. He made numerous attempts to bring about the Evil Force's coming with the Gouraigers killing each other and later Fangerus before ingesting the Raging Arrow (怒りの矢, Ikari no Ya) and the Grieving Bow to transform himself into the mobile giant Tau Zant Ultimate Form (タウ・ザント究極体, Tau Zanto Kyūkyokutai) and absorbs the Evil Force. But Tau Zant is shrunk down to human size and is finally destroyed by the ninjas using the Victory Gadget.
First Spear Furabiijo (一の槍フラビージョ, Ichi no Yari Furabījo)
A kunoichi dropout in a bee headdress and a user of the bee ninja art who Tau Zant recruited, carrying a notepad she uses to grade Space Ninja members sent to attack Earth. She once acted on her own by creating the android Furabijenu, who briefly forced her out of Jakanja before manipulating Nanami into creating a remote control for her creation. Following the series finale, assumed to have been killed, Furabiijo and Wendinu ended up on Dino Earth where they attempted to ally themselves with the Evoliens during the events of Abaranger vs. Hurricaneger. Furabiijo later resurfaces briefly in GoGo Sentai Boukenger vs. Super Sentai as a key ingredient in Chronos's plans, making a return appearance in Ninpuu Sentai Hurricaneger: 10 Years After as a supporter of Bat Ze Runba before taking her leave.
Second Spear Chuuzubo (二の槍チュウズーボ, Ni no Yari Chūzūbo)
The Ōnyūdō/frog-like leader of the Alien Ninja Corps, Chuunin that are enlarged by a magical scroll fired from Wendinu's bazooka, and wields an extendable rod as a weapon. Chuuzubo bore a grudge against the Gouraigers when they allowed his friend Octonyuudo to get killed, his actions against them resulting in them joining the Hurricanegers. Chuuzubo later uses the forbidden Dark Soul Summoning Ninja Art to enlarge himself with an increase in his power by sacrificing his life, overpowering the Hurricanegers and Gouraigers before being destroyed by Gourai Senpuujin.
Third Spear Manmaruba (三の槍マンマルバ, San no Yari Manmaruba)
Tau Zant's most valuable servant due to his ability to see the fixed future, Manmaruba developed a grudge against Ikkou after seeing his future death. Following Chuuzubo's death, Manmaruba undergoes a pupa state to become the scorpion-like Manmaruba Adult Form (マンマルバ成体, Manmaruba Seitai) to exact his revenge by infecting Ikkou with both a deadly Space Scorpion and its egg while foreseeing his own death by Ikkou's hand. While Hurricane Red averted Ikkou's death, Manmaruba creates a stronger clone of himself to continue in his place. The new Manmaruba's psychic power allows him to see a meteor shower allowing him to fully reveal the means to acquire the Evil Force, but the exposure mutates him into the mindless scorpion monster Manmaruba Reckless Form (マンマルバ暴走体, Manmaruba Bōsōtai) that is destroyed by Tenrai Senpuujin.
Fourth Spear Wendinu (四の槍ウェンディーヌ, Yon no Yari Wendīnu)
A snake ninja art mistress of disguise who appears on Earth with Furabiijo as the one who enlarges the Space Ninjas, occasionally called by her partner as "Wendy". Wendinu was made a Dark Spear due to her unique ability to grow into a giant super-strong berserker after amassing enough stress and rage in her. In that crazed state of mind, Wendinu destroys an entire planet single-handedly. After Manmaruba's death, Wendinu follows her own plan in setting up her own Wendinu Cram School scheme using brainwashed children to kill the ninja for her. In the process, she falls head over heels in love with a young man named Hashimoto. Once her plan failed Wendinu's rage reaches its zenith and she grows, overpowering the Karakuri Giants until the presence of Hashimoto causes her to shrink back to normal size. Following the series finale, assumed to have been killed, Wendinu and Furabiijo ended up on Dino Earth where they attempted to ally themselves with the Evolians during the events of Abaranger vs. Hurricaneger. Wendinu later resurfaces in Ninpuu Sentai Hurricaneger: 10 Years After as a supporter of Bat Ze Runba before taking her leave.
Fifth Spear Sargain (五の槍サーガイン, Go no Yari Sāgain)
A master swordsman and leader of the Puppet Ninja Corps, robots built by Sargain who are scanned by a Copy Giant (コピージャイアント, Kopī Jaianto) Wendinu summons upon their destruction. Despite appearances, Sargain is actually a cyborg ant piloting a puppet body equipped with the Dark Twin Swords Ganryuken from his shoulders. He also builds his own personal robots to fight the ninjas. Receiving the Raging Arrow from Sandaaru to unlock its power Sargain learns that it functions like the Shinobi Medals. Though he unlocked the Raging Arrow he lost it when Gaingain was destroyed. Though he survives the destruction of Gaingain, he is cut down with his own blade by Sadaaru as he had no more need of him.
Sixth Spear Satarakura (六の槍サタラクラ, Roku no Yari Satarakura)
A peacock/evil clown-like trickster with an Owarai-type personality who replaces Chuuzubo, commanding the Masked Ninja Corps who Wendinu revives into giants with a boomerang. When the Evil Force's coming approaches, Satarakura makes his move during the final meteor shower by using the Jaykumu Gun created from Sargain's data to suck the energy out of people and extracting the rage and sadness for Tau Zant. Satarakura was stopped by the Earth ninjas but Tau Zant saves him to preserve the Jaykumu Gun as it fused to his arm and drained him of his own energy. Taking advantage Satarakura uses the energy of the Jaykumu Gun to overpower the ninjas and take their energy. Sandaaru arrives once the Jaykumu Gun's energy pack is full and takes it before attempting to kill Satarakura. Though Satarakura survives, his mask is broken and his mind shattered turning him into a hateful psychopath intent on killing both sides. It takes Tenkuujin's self-destruct to finally kill him.
Seventh Spear Sandaaru (七の槍サンダール, Nana no Yari Sandāru)
A powerful shark-like ninja who destroyed many worlds before coming to Earth, master of the alien beasts that constitute the Fan Ninja Beast Corps that are stored in Sandaaru's fan until summoned. After he obtained the Raging Arrow from Astrom, he became the most powerful of all the Seven Dark Spears with aspirations of taking over Jakanja. With the exception of Sargain and Tau Zant, who played along, Sandaaru wins the other Jakanja members over while convincing them to all attack together rather than individually. After using the Earth Ninjas to power the Raging Arrow, Sandaaru uses Sargain to devise a method for its use before secretly killing him once making a copy of Sargain's Karakuri Ball system. It was only after acquiring the Grieving Bow from Kagura that Sandaaru learns Tau Zant was using him the entire time and reveals his true colors after the destruction of the Centipede. Surviving the Victory Gadget, Sandaaru enlarges himself and overpowers Revolver Gourai Senpuujin. At the last second, the Gouraigers are forced to sacrifice Gouraijin to kill Sandaaru.
Genin Magerappa (下忍マゲラッパ, Ge'nin Magerappa)
Low-ranked ninjas that serve as the Jakanja's foot soldiers.

==== Space-Ninja Corps ====
The Space-Ninja Corps (宇宙忍軍団, Uchūnin Gundan) are Chunin level space ninja that serve under the Seven Dark Lancers.

===== Alien Ninja Corps =====
The Alien Ninja Corps (宇宙人忍者群団, Uchūjin Ninja Gundan) are a group of ninjas that are led by Wendinu and are modeled after animals and plant life.

===== Puppet Ninja Corps =====
The Puppet Ninja Corps (クグツ忍者群団, Kugutsu Ninja Gundan) are a group of robotic ninjas that are created by Sargain that resemble organic/inorganic hybrids.

===== Masked Ninja Corps =====
The Masked Ninja Corps (仮面忍者軍団, Kamen Ninja Gundan) are a group of ninjas led by Satarakura who wear masks, are inspired by body parts, and have side-jobs when not being in use.

===== Fan Ninja Beast Corps =====
The Fan Ninja Beast Corps (扇忍獣群団, Sen'ninjū Gundan) are a group of mythical beast-themed ninjas that are led by Sandaaru. They are more mythical beasts than ninjas.

== Episodes ==
Episodes are referred to as "Scrolls" (巻之).

Scroll	Title	Directed by	Written by	Original release date
1	"Wind and Ninja" "Kaze to Ninja" (Japanese: 風とニンジャ)	Katsuya Watanabe	Junichi Miyashita	17 February 2002
2	"Giant and Gadgets" "Kyojin to Karakuri" (Japanese: 巨人とカラクリ)	Katsuya Watanabe	Junichi Miyashita	24 February 2002
3	"An Impostor and 60 Seconds" "Nisemono to Rokujūbyō" (Japanese: ニセモノと60秒)	Satoshi Morota	Junichi Miyashita	3 March 2002
4	"Tunnel and Siblings" "Tonneru to Kyōdai" (Japanese: トンネルと兄妹)	Satoshi Morota	Junichi Miyashita	10 March 2002
5	"The Chief and the Bath" "Kanchō to Ofuro" (Japanese: 館長とお風呂)	Hajime Konaka	Naoyuki Sakai	17 March 2002
6	"Scissors and Kunoichi" "Hasami to Kunoichi" (Japanese: ハサミとくノ一)	Hajime Konaka	Naoyuki Sakai	24 March 2002
7	"Thunder and Ninja" "Ikazuchi to Ninja" (Japanese: 雷とニンジャ)	Katsuya Watanabe	Junichi Miyashita	31 March 2002
8	"Wind and Thunder" "Hayate to Ikazuchi" (Japanese: 疾風（はやて）と迅雷（いかづち）)	Katsuya Watanabe	Junichi Miyashita	7 April 2002
9	"Thunder Brothers and the Hourglass" "Ikazuchi Kyōdai to Sunadokei" (Japanese: 雷兄弟と砂時計)	Satoshi Morota	Atsushi Maekawa	14 April 2002
10	"Thunder God and the Destroyed Valley" "Raijin to Horobi no Tani" (Japanese: 雷神と滅びの谷)	Satoshi Morota	Naoyuki Sakai	21 April 2002
11	"Dream Feast and Starting Anew" "Yumekui to Saishuppatsu" (Japanese: 夢喰いと再出発)	Hajime Hashimoto	Junichi Miyashita	28 April 2002
12	"Steel Frame and Father & Daughter" "Tekkotsu to Oyako" (Japanese: テッコツと父娘（おやこ）)	Hajime Hashimoto	Naruhisa Arakawa	5 May 2002
13	"Moustache and Engagement Ring" "Hige to Kon'yaku Yubiwa" (Japanese: ヒゲと婚約指輪)	Hajime Konaka	Atsushi Maekawa	12 May 2002
14	"Crybaby and Candy" "Nakimushi to Amedama" (Japanese: 泣き虫とあめ玉)	Hajime Konaka	Naoyuki Sakai	19 May 2002
15	"Giant Water Bug and Contest" "Tagame to Sōdatsusen" (Japanese: タガメと争奪戦)	Katsuya Watanabe	Naruhisa Arakawa	26 May 2002
16	"Mist and Prediction Device" "Kiri to Yogen Sōchi" (Japanese: 霧と予言装置)	Katsuya Watanabe	Junichi Miyashita	2 June 2002
17	"Darkness and the Island of Death-Bouts" "Kurayami to Shitō no Shima" (Japanese: 暗闇と死闘の島)	Satoshi Morota	Junichi Miyashita	9 June 2002
18	"Father and Brotherly Bonds" "Chichi to Kyōdai no Kizuna" (Japanese: 父と兄弟の絆)	Satoshi Morota	Junichi Miyashita	23 June 2002
19	"The Big Box and the Wind-Thunder Giant" "Ōbako to Fūrai Kyojin" (Japanese: 大箱と風雷巨人)	Noboru Takemoto	Atsushi Maekawa	30 June 2002
20	"Punch and Rival (パンチと好敵手（ライバル）, Panchi to Raibaru)"	Noboru Takemoto	Naoyuki Sakai	7 July 2002
21	"Masks and Riddles" "Kamen to Nazonazo" (Japanese: 仮面とナゾナゾ)	Satoshi Morota	Naruhisa Arakawa	14 July 2002
22	"Wings and Ninja" "Tsubasa to Ninja" (Japanese: 翼とニンジャ)	Satoshi Morota	Naruhisa Arakawa	21 July 2002
23	"Cologne and the Great Detective" "Koron to Meitantei" (Japanese: コロンと名探偵)	Toshio Ōi	Junichi Miyashita	28 July 2002
24	"Taiko and Lightning" "Taiko to Inazuma" (Japanese: タイコと稲妻)	Toshio Ōi	Junichi Miyashita	4 August 2002
25	"Ghost and Schoolgirl" "Obake to Jogakusei" (Japanese: オバケと女学生)	Noboru Takemoto	Naruhisa Arakawa	11 August 2002
26	"Bow & Arrow and Sea Bathing" "Yumiya to Kaisuiyoku" (Japanese: 弓矢と海水浴)	Noboru Takemoto	Atsushi Maekawa	18 August 2002
27	"Skewers and Zero Gravity" "Kushiyaki to Mujūryoku" (Japanese: 串焼きと無重力)	Satoshi Morota	Naoyuki Sakai	25 August 2002
28	"Hurrier and Counterattack" "Hariā to Gyakushū" (Japanese: ハリアーと逆襲)	Satoshi Morota	Junichi Miyashita	1 September 2002
29	"Lingering Summer Heat and Stamp" "Zansho to Sutanpu" (Japanese: 残暑とスタンプ)	Katsuya Watanabe	Shin Yoshida	8 September 2002
30	"Idol and Friendship" "Aidoru to Yūjō" (Japanese: アイドルと友情)	Katsuya Watanabe	Naruhisa Arakawa	15 September 2002
31	"Meteor and Three Wolves" "Ryūsei to Sanbiki no Ōkami" (Japanese: 流星と三匹の狼)	Toshio Ōi	Junichi Miyashita	22 September 2002
32	"The Grim Reaper and the Final Secret" "Shinigami to Saishū Ōgi" (Japanese: 死神と最終奥義)	Toshio Ōi	Junichi Miyashita	29 September 2002
33	"Mammoth and Six People" "Manmosu to Rokunin" (Japanese: マンモスと６人)	Satoshi Morota	Atsushi Maekawa	6 October 2002
34	"Mushrooms and 100 Points" "Kinoko to Hyakuten" (Japanese: キノコと100点)	Satoshi Morota	Atsushi Maekawa	13 October 2002
35	"Sparkle and Shamisen" "Kirari to Shamisen" (Japanese: キラリと三味線)	Katsuya Watanabe	Junichi Miyashita	20 October 2002
36	"Ring and Revenge" "Ringu to Fukushū" (Japanese: リングと復讐)	Katsuya Watanabe	Naruhisa Arakawa	27 October 2002
37	"The Third Spear and the Great Escape" "San no Yari to Dai Dasshutsu" (Japanese: 三の槍と大脱出)	Hajime Konaka	Naruhisa Arakawa	3 November 2002
38	"Demon Sword and Balloons" "Maken to Fūsen" (Japanese: 魔剣とふうせん)	Hajime Konaka	Shin Yoshida	10 November 2002
39	"The Seventh Spear and the Mysterious Stone" "Nana no Yari to Nazo no Ishi" (Japanese: 七の槍と謎の石)	Kenzo Maihara	Junichi Miyashita	17 November 2002
40	"Decoy and Ninja Law" "Otori to Shinobi no Okite" (Japanese: オトリと忍の掟)	Kenzo Maihara	Junichi Miyashita	24 November 2002
41	"Medal and Manzai" "Medaru to Manzai" (Japanese: メダルと漫才)	Katsuya Watanabe	Naoyuki Sakai	1 December 2002
42	"Armor and Raging Arrow" "Yoroi to Ikari no Ya" (Japanese: 鎧と怒りの矢)	Katsuya Watanabe	Atsushi Maekawa	8 December 2002
43	"Super Fusion and Big Clash" "Chō Gattai to Dai Gekitotsu" (Japanese: 超合体と大激突)	Noboru Takemoto	Junichi Miyashita	15 December 2002
44	"Your Majesty and the Evil Fan Beast" "Gozen-sama to Kyōsenjū" (Japanese: 御前様と凶扇獣)	Noboru Takemoto	Junichi Miyashita	22 December 2002
45	"Refuge and Spring Cleaning" "Kakurega to Ōsōji" (Japanese: 隠れ家と大掃除)	Shojiro Nakazawa	Atsushi Maekawa	29 December 2002
46	"New Year's Meal and Three Giants" "Osechi to San Kyojin" (Japanese: おせちと三巨人)	Shojiro Nakazawa	Atsushi Maekawa	5 January 2003
47	"Seal and Space Unification" "Fūin to Uchū Tōitsu" (Japanese: 封印と宇宙統一)	Satoshi Morota	Shin Yoshida	12 January 2003
48	"Trap and Eternal Life" "Wana to Eien no Inochi" (Japanese: 罠と永遠の命)	Satoshi Morota	Shin Yoshida	19 January 2003
49	"Mission and the Heavenly Ninja" "Shimei to Tenkū Ninja" (Japanese: 使命と天空忍者)	Katsuya Watanabe	Junichi Miyashita	26 January 2003
50	"Darkness and a New World" "Ankoku to Shin Sekai" (Japanese: 暗黒と新世界)	Katsuya Watanabe	Junichi Miyashita	2 February 2003
51	"Wind, Water, and Earth" "Kaze to Mizu to Daichi" (Japanese: 風と水と大地)	Katsuya Watanabe	Junichi Miyashita	9 February 2003

== Film ==
=== Shushutto the Movie ===
Ninpu Sentai Hurricaneger: Shushutto the Movie (忍風戦隊ハリケンジャー シュシュッと THE MOVIE, Ninpū Sentai Harikenjā Shushutto Za Mūbī) is a 2002 film, which takes place between episodes 25 and 26.

=== V-Cinema ===
- Ninpu Sentai Hurricaneger vs. Gaoranger (忍風戦隊ハリケンジャーVSガオレンジャー, Ninpū Sentai Harikenjā Tai Gaorenjā): A 2003 V-Cinema release, which takes place between episodes 30 and 31.
- Bakuryū Sentai Abaranger vs. Hurricaneger (爆竜戦隊アバレンジャーVSハリケンジャー, Bakuryū Sentai Abarenjā Tai Harikenjā): A 2004 V-Cinema release, which takes place between episodes 40 and 41 of Bakuryū Sentai Abaranger.
- GoGo Sentai Boukenger vs. Super Sentai (轟轟戦隊ボウケンジャーVSスーパー戦隊, Gōgō Sentai Bōkenjā Tai Sūpā Sentai): A 2007 V-Cinema release, which takes place between episodes 42 and 43 of GoGo Sentai Boukenger.
- Ninpu Sentai Hurricaneger: 10 Years After (忍風戦隊ハリケンジャー 10 YEARS AFTER, Ninpū Sentai Harikenjā Ten Iyāzu Afutā): A 2013 V-Cinema release, which takes place after the final episode of the series.
- Ninpu Sentai Hurricaneger de Gozaru! Shushutto 20th Anniversary (忍風戦隊ハリケンジャーでござる！シュシュッと20th Anniversary, Ninpū Sentai Harikenjā de Gozaru! Shushutto Tuentīsu Anibāsarī): A 2023 V-Cinema release, which takes place after the final episode of the series.

=== Specials ===
- Ninpu Sentai Hurricaneger: Super Ninja and Super Kuroko (忍風戦隊ハリケンジャー スーパー忍者とスーパー黒子, Ninpū Sentai Harikenjā Sūpā Ninja to Sūpā Kuroko): A 2002 Kodansha Super Video special.
- Hero Mama League (ヒーローママ★リーグ, Hīrō Mama Rīgu): A 2018 Toei Tokusatsu Fan Club-exclusive special.
- Ninpu Sentai Hurricaneger With Donbrothers (忍風戦隊ハリケンジャーwithドンブラザーズ, Ninpū Sentai Harikenjā Wizu Donburazāzu): A 2022 Toei Tokusatsu Fan Club-exclusive special that is a prequel to Ninpuu Sentai Hurricaneger de Gozaru! Shushutto 20th Anniversary.

== Cast ==
- Yosuke Shiina, Yonosuke (Shushutto 20th Anniversary): Shun Shioya (塩谷 瞬, Shioya Shun)
- Nanami Nono, Nami (なみ; Shushutto 20th Anniversary): Nao Nagasawa (長澤 奈央, Nagasawa Nao)
- Kota Bito, Kotaro (吼太郎, Kōtarō; Shushutto 20th Anniversary): Kōhei Yamamoto (山本 康平, Yamamoto Kōhei)
- Ikkou Kasumi, Ikkaku (一角; Shushutto 20th Anniversary): Yujiro Shirakawa (白川 裕二郎, Shirakawa Yūjirō)
- Isshu Kasumi, Ikki (一牙; Shushutto 20th Anniversary): Nobuo Kyo (姜 暢雄, Kyō Nobuo)
- Furabiijo: Azusa Yamamoto (山本 梓, Yamamoto Azusa)
- Wendinu: Mio Fukuzumi (福澄 美緒, Fukuzumi Mio)
- Futoshi Hase (馳 太, Hase Futoshi): Hiroshi Teruya (てるや ひろし, Teruya Hiroshi)
- Kagura, Inquirer (10 Years After): Hitomi Miwa (三輪 ひとみ, Miwa Hitomi)
- Mugensai Hinata: Ken Nishida (西田 健, Nishida Ken)
- Oboro Hinata: Shoko Takada (高田 聖子, Takada Shōko)

=== Voice cast ===
- Shurikenger: Taiki Matsuno (松野 太紀, Matsuno Taiki) (Note: In Shushutto 20th Anniversary, Taiki Matsuno appeared on screen as Sonoshin Nagao (長尾 聡之心, Nagao Sō'noshin).)
- Tau Zanto: Kiyoyuki Yanada (梁田 清之, Yanada Kiyoyuki)
- Chuuzubo: Daisuke Gōri (郷里 大輔, Gōri Daisuke)
- Manmaruba: Takahiro Imamura (今村 卓博, Imamura Takahiro)
- Sargain: Yoshinori Okamoto (岡本 美登, Okamoto Yoshinori)
- Satarakura: Bin Shimada (島田 敏, Shimada Bin)
- Sandaaru: Shūichi Ikeda (池田 秀一, Ikeda Shūichi)
- Narrator, Fuuraimaru, Bat Zhe Rumba (10 Years After): Hironori Miyata (宮田 浩徳, Miyata Hironori)

=== Guest cast ===
- Ikki Kasumi (15-18, 31): Jiro Dan (団 時朗, Dan Jirō)
- Taro Kakio (柿生 太郎, Kakio Tarō; 23): Kunihiko Oshiba (大柴 邦彦, Ōshiba Kunihiko)
- Roppei Tsuzumi (鼓 六平, Tsuzumi Roppei; 24, 51): Ryuichiro Nishioka (西岡 竜一朗, Nishioka Ryūichirō)
- Kazuya Misaki (三崎 和也, Misaki Kazuya; 26, 51): Masaya Matsukaze (松風 雅也, Matsukaze Masaya)
- Yuusaku Ramon (羅門 勇作, Ramon Yūsaku; 28): Toshiya Fuji (藤 敏也, Fuji Toshiya)
- Doctor Takanashi (高梨医師, Tanakanashi-ishi; 32): Takashi Inoue (井上 高志, Inoue Takashi)
- Yoshinari Hashimoto (橋本 善成, Hashimoto Yoshinari; 34, 51): Yoshihiro Masujima (増島 愛浩, Masujima Yoshihiro)
- Kazuma Namekawa (滑川 数馬, Namekawa Kazuma; 35, 51): Yūji Kishi (岸 祐二, Kishi Yūji)
- Teppei Sakaki (坂木 鉄平, Sakaki Teppei; 39): Shūhei Izumi (和泉 宗兵, Izumi Shūhei)
- Sanpei Hamada (浜田 三平, Hamada Sanpei; 42, 51): Tatsuya Nōmi (能見 達也, Nōmi Tatsuya)
- Jou Kikuchi (菊池 丈, Kikuchi Jō; 44, 51): Masaru Shishido (宍戸 勝, Shishido Masaru)
- Retsudou (烈堂, Retsudō; 45): Kenji Ohba (大葉 健二, Ōba Kenji)

=== Spin-off cast ===
- Princess Laiina (ライーナ姫, Raīna-hime; Shushutto the Movie): Sayaka Yoshino (吉野 紗香, Yoshino Sayaka)
- Knuckle (ナックル, Nakkuru; Voice; Shushutto the Movie): Yūko Miyamura (宮村 優子, Miyamura Yūko)
- Space Ninja Monkey Hizaaru (宇宙忍猿ヒザール, Uchū Nin'en Hizāru; Voice; Shushutto the Movie), Combined Space Ninja Monkey Ashurazaaru (合体宇宙忍猿アシュラザール, Gattai Uchū Nin'en Ashurazāru; Voice; Shushutto the Movie): Arata Furuta (古田 新太, Furuta Arata)
- Space Ninja Monkey Blizaaru (宇宙忍猿ブリザール, Uchū Nin'en Burizāru; Voice; Shushutto the Movie): Hiroyuki Muraoka (村岡 弘之, Muraoka Hiroyuki)
- Chubouzu (チュウボウズ, Chūbōzu; Voice; Hurricaneger vs. Gaoranger): Yūji Kishi
- Tenkai (10 Years After): Komi Hashimoto (橋本 仰未, Hashimoto Kōmi)
- Teruhime (照姫; Shushutto 20th Anniversary): Nagi Hasegawa (羽瀬川 なぎ, Hasegawa Nagi)
- Moeru Kirarazaka (雲母坂 萌瑠, Kirarazaka Moeru; Shushutto 20th Anniversary): Hazuki Kimura (木村 葉月, Kimura Hazuki)
- Oiranda (オイランダ; Shushutto 20th Anniversary): Hana Hizuki (陽月 華, Hizuki Hana)
- Aunja (アウンジャ, Aunjya; Voice; Shushutto 20th Anniversary): Kenji Nomura (乃村 健次, Nomura Kenji)

== Songs ==
Opening theme

- "Hurricaneger Sanjō!" (ハリケンジャー参上！, Harikenjā Sanjō!; Hurricanegers Arrive!) (1-50)
  - Lyrics: Neko Oikawa (及川 眠子, Oikawa Neko)
  - Composition & Arrangement: Takeshi Ike (池 毅, Ike Takeshi)
  - Artist: Hideaki Takatori (高取 ヒデアキ, Takatori Hideaki)
    - The second part of this song is used as ending theme of episode 51

Ending theme

- "Ima, Kaze no Naka de" (いま,風のなかで; "Now We're in the Wind") (1-50)
  - Lyrics & Composition: Hideaki Takatori
  - Arrangement: Hiroaki Kagoshima (籠島 裕昌, Kagoshima Hiroaki)
  - Artist: Hironobu Kageyama (影山 ヒロノブ, Kageyama Hironobu)
