= Nobuo Kyo =

Zainichi Korean actor (born 1979)

- 姜 暢雄
- Born: March 23, 1979 (age 47); Himeji, Hyōgo, Japan
- Occupation: Actor
- Years active: 2000–present
- Agent: Cube
- Height: 182 cm (6 ft 0 in)

Nobuo Kyo (姜 暢雄, Kyō Nobuo; born March 23, 1979, in Himeji, Hyōgo, Japan) is a Japanese actor who is represented by the talent agency Cube. He graduated from Ichikawa High School.

== Biography ==
Kyo was born with Korean nationality in Japan and later became a naturalized Japanese. In 1998, he won the photogenic award and P-mail grand prix at the 11th Junon Super Boy Contest. His application was submitted by his sister. Kyo signed with the talent agency, Cube, and made his stage debut as a member of Studio Life, a troupe Cube managed. In 2002, Kyo later debuted in Ninpu Sentai Hurricanger as Isshuu Kasumi / Kuwaga Raiger. After that he appeared in television dramas, films, and stage shows.

Kyo appeared in dramas and films such as Wakaba, Trick, Nana2, and Hanazakari no Kimitachi e.

He, with Kohei Yamamoto, Yujiro Shirakawa, Ryuichiro Nishioka, and Yūsuke Tomoi, became a member of the clothes brand Anunnaki.

== Filmography ==
=== TV series ===
Year	Title	Role	Network	Notes
2002	Ninpu Sentai Hurricanger	Isshuu Kasumi / Kuwaga Raiger	TV Asahi	
2003	Trick	Aisuke Kikuchi	TV Asahi	
2007	Hanazakari no Kimitachi e	Oscar M. Himeshima (Masao Himeshima)	Fuji TV	
2008	Zettai Kareshi (TV Series)	Ishizeki	Fuji TV	
2009	Mei-chan no Shitsuji	Nezu	Fuji TV	
2009	Liar Game: Season 2	Tatsuya Kawai	Fuji TV	Episodes 5 to 9

=== Films ===
Year	Title	Role	Notes
2000	Eri Nikubittake	Ponta	
2002	Ninpu Sentai Hurricanger: Shushutto the Movie	Isshuu Kasumi / Kuwaga Raiger	
2002	Blue Spring		
2004	Is-A	Katsuji Namihata	
2006	Nana 2	Ren Honjō	
2011	Into the White Night	Issei Shinozuka	
2022	Avataro Sentai Donbrothers The Movie: New First Love Hero	Kuroiwa / Ninpuki	
