= Break Through! =

- Poster

Japanese name
- Kana: パッチギ!
Transcriptions
- Revised Hepburn: Patchigi!
- Directed by: Kazuyuki Izutsu
- Screenplay by: Daisuke Habara; Kazuyuki Izutsu
- Produced by: Lee Bong-ou; Hitomi Ishihara
- Starring: Erika Sawajiri; Shun Shioya; Yōko Maki
- Cinematography: Hideo Yamamoto
- Edited by: Nobuko Tomita
- Music by: Kazuhiko Katō
- Production companies: Cinequanon; Happinet Pictures; Eisei Gekijo; Memory-Tech; Stardust Pictures
- Release date: January 22, 2005 (Japan)
- Running time: 118 minutes
- Country: Japan
- Language: Japanese

Break Through! (Japanese: パッチギ!, Hepburn: Patchigi!), also known as We Shall Overcome Someday, is a 2005 Japanese film directed by Kazuyuki Izutsu.

== Plot ==
Kosuke Matsuyama (Shun Shioya) is a second-year high school student who finds himself in the middle of a rampaging crowd of Korean boys, who are outraged by insults made by his classmates towards two Korean girls. Kosuke manages to escape, but he and his friend Yoshio (Keisuke Koide) are sent by their homeroom teacher to invite the Korean students to a friendly soccer game to restore peace.

When entering the territory, Kosuke encounters Lee Kyung-ja (Erika Sawajiri), a girl playing a Korean folk song on a flute. Kosuke and Yoshio are almost lynched by Lee Kyung-ja's older brother Lee An-sun (Sousuke Takaoka) and his gang, but Kosuke is already smitten.

Kosuke aims to learn and master a musical composition and earn the affection of a young woman from a hostile environment, while Lee An-sun and his group participate in street skirmishes with Japanese delinquents, which leads to multiple defeats, and discovers that his partner Kyoko Yanagihara, is expecting a child and wants to keep it, which leads to Lee An-sun being left learning how to mature.

== Cast ==
- Shun Shioya as Kosuke Matsuyama (松山浩介), the main protagonist and a second-year student who falls in love with a girl of Korean origin, Lee Kyung-ja.
- Keisuke Koide as Norio Yoshida (吉田紀男), Kosuke Matsuyama's best friend.
- Sousuke Takaoka as Lee An-sung (이안성/イ・アンソン), a Zainichi Korean troublemaker who is the hot headed older brother of Lee Kyung-ja and girlfriend of Matsuyama
- Erika Sawajiri as Lee Kyung-ja (이경자/イ・キョンジャ), a Zainichi Korean student who studies in a North Korean school in Kyoto and Lee An-sung's shy younger sister who dreams of becoming a movie star. She's also the love interest of Kosuke Matsuyama.
- Kazuki Namioka as Motoki Bang-ho (모토키 방호/モトキ・バンホー), Lee An-sung's best friend.
- Hiroyuki Onoue as Park Jae-dok (박재독/パク・ジェドク), Lee An-sung's younger brother.
- Kyoko Yanagihara as Momoko (桃子), Lee An-sung's girlfriend who gets pregnant by him, making him make a decision about his life.
- Yoko Maki as Chun Gang-ja (전강자/チョン・ガンジャ), the best martial artist in the North Korean school and the friend of Lee An-sung, Motoki and Jae-dok.
- Noriko Eguchi as Hyeyoung (혜영/ヘヨン), Chun Gang-ja's best friend

== Awards ==
48th Blue Ribbon Awards

- Won: Best Film

27th Yokohama Film Festival

- Won: Best Film
- Won: Best Director - Kazuyuki Izutsu
- Won: Best Cinematography - Hideo Yamamoto
- Won: Best Newcomer - Erika Sawajiri and Shun Shioya
