= Tet Wada =

Japanese actor

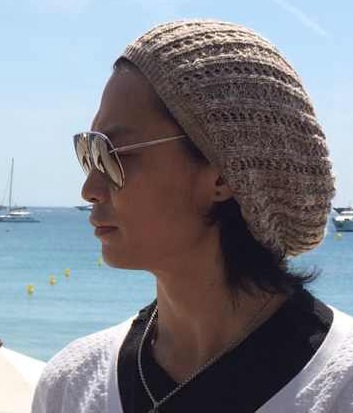
- Born: January 20, 1973 (age 53); Tokyo, Japan
- Occupation: Actor
- Height: 5 ft 9 in (1.75 m)
- Website: TET WADA Official Web Site

Tet Wada (born January 20, 1973) is a global actor working in Asia, Europe and North America. Wada was born in Tokyo.

== Early life ==
Wada was born in Minato-ku, Tokyo. He moved to the United States at the age of 18 and obtained a degree in international marketing from Baruch College in New York City.

== Career ==
Following his graduation, Wada joined the headquarters of Donna Karan New York, where he worked in a marketing capacity. During his student years, he also served as a researcher and house model for leather designer Anton, whose clientele included internationally renowned artists such as Aerosmith, Lenny Kravitz, Sting, and Alicia Keys.

New York–based modeling agency Q Models discovered Wada and signed him as the agency’s first Asian male model. Although he initially had little interest in pursuing modeling professionally and continued working at Donna Karan New York, his striking Asian features and composed presence quickly drew industry attention, ultimately leading him to leave his marketing position and devote himself fully to modeling.[1]

Wada subsequently became the first Japanese male model to appear in Vogue Paris. He gained further international recognition through a widely discussed editorial alongside top model Daria Werbowy, featuring an iconic photograph of the pair kissing.[2] He later established himself as one of Asia’s leading fashion figures, collaborating with internationally acclaimed photographers including Michael Thompson, Terry Richardson, Markus Klinko, and Greg Lotus.

In addition to his modeling career, Wada appeared in numerous American television productions and films. One feature film in which he played a leading role was screened at the New York City Independent Film Festival in 2012.[3]

In 2012, Wada formally shifted the focus of his career to Asia. After completing a film project in Japan, he spent three months in Taiwan as a principal cast member of the television drama Chocolat, which was later broadcast across Japan, Taiwan, Singapore, Indonesia, and other Asian countries in 2013.[4]

Throughout his career, Wada has appeared in advertising campaigns for numerous global brands, including Sony, HP Inc., Motorola, SK-II, L’Oréal, Subaru, Evian, Bacardi, Uniqlo, and Gap Inc.. He was notably selected by Uniqlo during the brand’s early expansion into the United States and European markets and remained featured in its campaigns for four consecutive years.[5]

In Asia, he continued to appear in a wide range of commercial campaigns, including the Diane Shampoo series from 2013 to 2015 alongside Yuriko Yoshitaka.[6] He later appeared in campaigns for Laundrin with Ai Tominaga and in Fine Visual advertisements with Harisembon between 2018 and 2019.[7][8]

== Personal life ==
・He is fluent in Japanese, English, and Spanish, and later studied Chinese in Taipei following his casting in the film Chocolat.[9]

・Having spent many years abroad, he is often mistaken for Japanese-American; however, he is fully Japanese by heritage.[1] He values living in different countries, cultural diversity, and building connections with people from around the world.

・An avid correspondent, he is known for sending handwritten letters to close friends and family members on their birthdays. He also maintains an active presence through regularly updated blogs.

・From an early age, he developed a strong interest in both the English language and motorcycles, frequently watching English-language television programs.[10] According to his blog, he resolved to move to the United States while still in elementary school after watching the American film Smokey and the Bandit II.[11]

・During his elementary school years, he became proficient at riding a miniature Yamaha motocross bike.[12] He continues to ride a vintage American-manufactured Honda motorcycle that he previously owned in New York and later shipped back to Japan. He has remarked that “a motorcycle is a man’s lifelong partner in the pursuit of his dreams.”

・He is also acquainted with Anton, a New York–based exotic skin and leather artist, from whom he studied fashion by visiting his studio on a daily basis. Anton was the first to encourage him to pursue modeling professionally.

He admires the philosophy and way of life of Bruce Lee and has trained in multiple martial arts disciplines, including Aikido. He has maintained a fitness regimen for more than two decades. He also holds a fourth-degree black belt in Aikido, the traditional Japanese martial art.

== Filmography ==
- 2005 Winter Butterfly
- 2006 One Night with You
- 2008 Dungeon
- 2008 Tenure of Edmond Fontier
- 2010 Sex and the City II
- 2010 Wall Street II
- 2011 Into the New World
- 2012 Premium Rush
- 2014 Fuja
- 2015 S Last Policeman-Recovery of Our Future
- 2016 Iyana Onna (Desperate Sunflowers)
- 2017 Kyou no Kirakun
- 2018 Impossibility Defense
- 2026 Nihontoitsu Yamazaki Ichimon ll
- 2026 Welcome to Ginza Le Jardin ll
- 2026 Jiageya

== Television ==
- 2008 BLOODY MONDAY TBS Television (Japan)
- 2010 Royal Pains (USA)
- 2011 Lights Out (USA)
- 2014 Chocolat (Taiwan & 15 different Asian countries)
- 2015 Ashitamokitto, oishii gohan Fuji TV
- 2016 99.9-Keijisenmon Bengoshi TBS Television (Japan)
- 2017 Utsubokazura no Yume Fuji TV
- 2017 Anatagakokoni Irudakede RKB Mainichi Broadcasting
- 2018 Boys Over Flowers Season 2 TBS Television (Japan)
- 2022 Avataro Sentai Donbrothers TV Asahi
- 2022 Keishicho Kyokohankakari Higuchi Akira Season 2 TV Tokyo
- 2022 Kurosagi (manga) Season 2 TBS Television (Japan)
- 2024 In’nai Keisatsu Season 1 Fuji TV
- 2025 Private Banker TV Asahi (Japan)

== Theatre ==
- T. Schreiber Studio New York, NY 「Fat Pig」（2014 by Peter Jensen ／Tom ）
- Stella Adler Studio of Acting New York, NY 「The Performers」（2014. Paul Takacs ／Lee ）
- Stella Adler Studio of Acting New York, NY 「Lone Star」（2014. Paul Takacs ／Roy ）
- THE LAST SONG (2015. The Galaxy Theatre Tokyo by Ryosei Kajiwara／Kida)
- RADIO 311 (2016. Tokyo Metropolitan Theatre by Ryosei Kajiwara ／Tuxedo )

== Radio ==
- Rocky's Music Salad (Jan 21, 2012）Shibuya FM, Tokyo
- Sounds of Story Asada Jiro Library （Sep 13, 2014） J-Wave, Japan
- ON THE PLANET (2015- 2017) Radio personality Japan FM Network (Japan)
- Go Around the World (April 28, 2021) Rainbow Town FM, Tokyo
- Go Around the World (Aug 24, 2022) Rainbow Town FM, Tokyo
