= List of Avataro Sentai Donbrothers episodes =

This is a list of episodes for Avataro Sentai Donbrothers, a Japanese tokusatsu television drama. It is the third series in the franchise released in Japan's Reiwa Era and the 46th entry of Toei's long-running Super Sentai series produced by TV Asahi. The series also acts as a sequel for the previous entry, Kikai Sentai Zenkaiger. A director's cut of the final episode was released on Toei Tokusatsu Fan Club on May 3, 2023.

== Episodes ==
No.	English title Original Japanese title	Directed by	Written by	Original release date
1	"Avataro"; Transliteration: "Abatarō" (Japanese: あばたろう)	Ryuta Tasaki	Toshiki Inoue	March 6, 2022
Jin Momoi finds a baby inside a peach-shaped capsule and takes the child with him. 21 years later, high schooler and manga artist Haruka Kitou is accused of being a plagiarist as she mysteriously obtains yellow sunglasses and is chosen to become Oni Sister. Jin reveals to Haruka that she's been decided to fight monsters known as the Nouto from attacking the city. She learns that as a result of becoming Oni Sister, she has joined the Donbrothers. Along the way, she meets fellow members Kiji Brother and Don Momotaro!: This episode is a tribute to Kishiryu Sentai Ryusoulger.
2	"Big Peach, Small Peach"; Transliteration: "Ōmomo, Komomo" (Japanese: おおもも、こもも)	Ryuta Tasaki	Toshiki Inoue	March 13, 2022
Haruka is instructed by Jin to look for his son, Taro, in order to bring her life back to normal and starts working under Kaito Goshikida at the Donbura café. Meanwhile, Taro is in trouble when one of his co-workers turns into a monstrous Hitotsuki out of her desire to become younger. Leading Haruka to meet another member named Inu Brother.: This episode is a tribute to Ressha Sentai ToQger.
3	"The Light Thief"; Transliteration: "Akari Dorobō" (Japanese: あかりどろぼう)	Shojiro Nakazawa	Toshiki Inoue	March 20, 2022
Haruka joins forces with Taro and Shinichi Saruhara, unaware of their identities as Don Momotaro and Saru Brother, to investigate a mysterious thief who steals the lamps of his victims' houses. Reunited for the first time, the Donbrothers encounter Sononi, another member of the Nouto.: This episode is a tribute to the Lupinrangers from Kaitou Sentai Lupinranger VS Keisatsu Sentai Patranger.
4	"The Onigiri Demon"; Transliteration: "Onigiri no Oni" (Japanese: おにぎりのおに)	Shojiro Nakazawa	Toshiki Inoue	March 27, 2022
With Shirokuma Express temporary closed, Taro begins working a part-time job at the company where Tsuyoshi Kijino works, unaware of his secret identity as Kiji Brother until both must fight a Hitotsuki who is obsessed with rice balls.: This episode is a tribute to Chouriki Sentai Ohranger.
5	"The Holed-Up Dog"; Transliteration: "Tatekomotta Inu" (Japanese: たてこもったイヌ)	Katsuya Watanabe	Toshiki Inoue	April 3, 2022
Tsubasa Inuzuka is a fugitive from justice who claims he is innocent. While fleeing from the police, Tsubasa accidentally stumbles on Taro, Shinichi, Haruka, and Tsuyoshi, who are unaware that he is Inu Brother, one of their companions.: This episode is a tribute to the Patrangers from Kaitou Sentai Lupinranger VS Keisatsu Sentai Patranger.
6	"The Pheasant's Short-Lived Glory"; Transliteration: "Kiji Mikkatenka" (Japanese: キジみっかてんか)	Katsuya Watanabe	Toshiki Inoue	April 10, 2022
Tsuyoshi is in fear of not being a suitable man to his wife, a well known beautician. After being encouraged by Kaito, he decides to do something about it and challenges Taro in order to prove himself.: This episode is a tribute to Doubutsu Sentai Zyuohger.
7	"A Group of Teachers"; Transliteration: "Sensei no Mure" (Japanese: せんせいのむれ)	Hiroyuki Katō	Toshiki Inoue	April 17, 2022
Shinichi and Taro pay a visit to Haruka's school as special guest teachers when the principal turns into a Hitotsuki and attacks the students.: This episode is a tribute to Chikyuu Sentai Fiveman.
8	"A Long-Haired Captive"; Transliteration: "Ronge no Toriko" (Japanese: ろんげのとりこ)	Hiroyuki Katō	Toshiki Inoue	April 24, 2022
Tsuyoshi and Tsubasa meet by coincidence, the two unaware of each other's identities as Donbrothers and the striking resemblance between Tsuyoshi's wife, Miho, and Tsubasa's beloved, Natsumi. Meanwhile, Taro encounters Sonoi, the leader of the Nouto, also unaware that they are enemies.: This episode is a tribute to Mashin Sentai Kiramager.
9	"Worn-Out Taro and Robotaro"; Transliteration: "Borotarō to Robotarō" (Japanese: ぼろたろうとロボタロウ)	Ryuta Tasaki	Toshiki Inoue	May 1, 2022
Taro is struck with a mysterious condition that rends him lethargic. As Haruka and Shinichi look for a way to cure him, Kaito joins the Donbrothers in battle, revealing his secret identity as Zenkaizer Black.: This episode is a tribute to Tokumei Sentai Go-Busters.
10	"The Rainbow the Oni Saw"; Transliteration: "Oni ga Mita Niji" (Japanese: オニがみたにじ)	Ryuta Tasaki	Toshiki Inoue	May 8, 2022
Haruka obtains enough Kibi-Points to leave the Donbrothers and restore her reputation as a manga artist, but she feels uneasy when her former companions face another Hitotsuki, accompanied by her replacement Marina Maeda, a photographer who is struggling through the same predicaments as she did.: This episode is a tribute to Kaizoku Sentai Gokaiger.
11	"The Dog Gets Sick"; Transliteration: "Inu no Kakuran" (Japanese: イヌのかくらん)	Kyohei Yamaguchi	Toshiki Inoue	May 15, 2022
A man obsessed with becoming a ninja transforms into a Hitotsuki and attacks Taro while Tsubasa gets sick and the other Donbrothers take care of him. Meanwhile, the Nouto consult with Jin about a new type of monster that poses an even bigger threat.: This episode is a tribute to Shuriken Sentai Ninninger.
12	"The Moon Is a Liar"; Transliteration: "Tsuki wa Usotsuki" (Japanese: つきはウソつき)	Kyohei Yamaguchi	Toshiki Inoue	May 22, 2022
Kirara Kira, an aspiring idol, begins working part-time at Donbura when an obsessed fan turns into a Hitotsuki and attacks her. Meanwhile, a worried Taro has another meeting with Sonoi, who provides him with advice.: This episode is a tribute to Uchu Sentai Kyuranger.
13	"Farewell, Taro"; Transliteration: "Sayonara Tarō" (Japanese: さよならタロウ)	Katsuya Watanabe	Toshiki Inoue	May 29, 2022
Fed up with Taro's behavior, the other Donbrothers decide to stop fighting alongside him. Meanwhile, Sonoi discovers Taro's real identity and is ordered to kill him.: This episode is a tribute to Zyuden Sentai Kyoryuger.
14	"Jiro the Substitute"; Transliteration: "Migawari Jirō" (Japanese: みがわりジロウ)	Katsuya Watanabe	Toshiki Inoue	June 5, 2022
The other Donbrothers look for a way to bring Taro back, while Jiro Momotani, another individual whose dream is to become a hero, appears before them.: This episode is a tribute to Kousoku Sentai Turboranger.
15	"Welcome Back, Taro"; Transliteration: "Okaeri Tarō" (Japanese: おかえりタロウ)	Katsuya Watanabe	Toshiki Inoue	June 12, 2022
While Haruka and Shinichi are crippled from their failed attempt to revive Taro and Tsuyoshi transforms into a Hitotsuki, Jiro obtains the power to transform into a Donbrother as well to help set things straight.: This episode is a tribute to Gekisou Sentai Carranger and take place before the events of Avataro Sentai Donbrothers Meets Senpaiger.
16	"The Dark Side Switch"; Transliteration: "Yami Ochi Suitchi" (Japanese: やみおちスイッチ)	Hiroyuki Katō	Toshiki Inoue	June 19, 2022
Jiro tries his best to appease the other Donbrothers, but their annoyance with his meddling causes him to show a more dangerous side of himself.: This episode is a tribute to Kyoryu Sentai Zyuranger and take place after the events of Avataro Sentai Donbrothers Meets Senpaiger.
17	"Light and Tsubasa"; Transliteration: "Hikari to Tsubasa" (Japanese: ひかりとつばさ)	Hiroyuki Katō	Toshiki Inoue	June 26, 2022
One year has passed since Tsubasa made his promise to Natsumi and Tsubasa believes that soon he will reunite with her, but instead, he meets a young heartbroken man who is about to turn into a Hitotsuki.: This episode is a tribute to Choujin Sentai Jetman.
18	"A Jaws Strike"; Transliteration: "Jōzu na Ippon" (Japanese: ジョーズないっぽん)	Satoshi Morota	Toshiki Inoue	July 3, 2022
Jiro has a contest with Taro to prove that he is on the same level as him, and upon knowing of this, Haruka, Shinichi and Tsuyoshi decide to join in. Meanwhile, Don Murasame, a new enemy appears before the Donbrothers.
19	"Hello Ghost"; Transliteration: "Moshimoshi Yūrei" (Japanese: もしもしユーレイ)	Satoshi Morota	Toshiki Inoue	July 10, 2022
Haruka meets a ghost who can't get to the afterlife because she is waiting for a call from the person she loves, while the Donbrothers face an enemy who has no corporeal form.: This episode is a tribute to Engine Sentai Go-Onger.
20	"Nose in the Air Elegy"; Transliteration: "Hanataka Erejii" (Japanese: はなたかえれじい)	Kyohei Yamaguchi	Toshiki Inoue	July 17, 2022
For the sake of Jiro's childhood friend Rumi, Taro temporarily leaves the Donbrothers and puts Jiro in charge of the team, but Jiro gets carried away and brings trouble to the others, while the Nouto are scouted to participate in a film.: This episode is a tribute to Gosei Sentai Dairanger and take place before the events of Avataro Sentai Donbrothers the Movie: New First Love Hero.
21	"Extreme Way of the Ramen"; Transliteration: "Goku Rāmen-dō" (Japanese: ごくラーメンどう)	Kyohei Yamaguchi	Toshiki Inoue	July 24, 2022
Shinichi encounters a man called "Shirai", who claims to be the previous Saru Brother. Meanwhile, Haruka is captured by Sonoza, the third member of the Nouto who wants her to continue her manga.: This episode is a tribute to Samurai Sentai Shinkenger and take place after the events of Avataro Sentai Donbrothers the Movie: New First Love Hero.
22	"Hellish Road of Manga"; Transliteration: "Jigoku Manga Michi" (Japanese: じごくマンガみち)	Katsuya Watanabe	Toshiki Inoue	July 31, 2022
Unable to comply with Sonoza's demands regarding her manga, Haruka decides to look for the mangaka who accused her of plagiarism in the first place. Meanwhile, Jiro returns to the countryside to make a visit to his friends.: This episode is a tribute to Denji Sentai Megaranger.
23	"The Dog Becomes a Dog"; Transliteration: "Inu, Inu ni Naru" (Japanese: イヌ、いぬになる)	Katsuya Watanabe	Toshiki Inoue	August 7, 2022
An accident makes Tsubasa trapped in his Inu Brother form and he gets into a series of misadventures. One member short, the Donbrothers have some difficulty fighting the Hitotsuki, when Jiro unlocks a new power within him.: This episode is a tribute to Juken Sentai Gekiranger.
24	"An Ensemble Son"; Transliteration: "Musuko Ni'ninbaori" (Japanese: むすこ、ににんばおり)	Hiroyuki Katō	Toshiki Inoue	August 14, 2022
Taro meets a mother who mistakes him for his missing son. Shinichi asks Taro to pass as her son in order to cheer her up, but Taro's incapable of lying and he comes with a plan.: This episode is a tribute to Ninja Sentai Kakuranger.
25	"Hero-Worker"; Transliteration: "Hīrō Shigoto'nin" (Japanese: ヒーローしごとにん)	Hiroyuki Katō	Toshiki Inoue	August 21, 2022
Tsuyoshi is fired and too ashamed to tell Miho about it, begins working hard on part-time jobs to make ends meet, but he gets too tired to fight as a Donbrother and Taro decides to lend him a hand.: This episode is a tribute to Dai Sentai Goggle V.
26	"Hasty Finale"; Transliteration: "Fināre Isamiashi" (Japanese: フィナーレいさみあし)	Kazuyuki Chatani	Saburo Yatsude	August 28, 2022
After watching the final episode of Kamen Rider Revice, Kaito assembles the Donbrothers and holds a meeting to decide who among them had contributed most to the team so far, while reminiscing about their past battles.: This episode is a tribute to Kamen Rider Revice.
27	"A Serious Duel"; Transliteration: "Kettō Maji Maji" (Japanese: けっとうマジマジ)	Ryuta Tasaki	Toshiki Inoue	September 4, 2022
Taro and Sonoi have a duel to settle their score once and for all, but their match is interrupted by a sudden attack from the Juto and a man they previously saved who turned into a Hitotsuki again.: This episode is a tribute to Mahou Sentai Magiranger.
28	"Secret's Secret"; Transliteration: "Himitsu no Himitsu" (Japanese: ひみつのヒミツ)	Ryuta Tasaki	Toshiki Inoue	September 11, 2022
A woman approaches Tsubasa and enlists his help to steal a painting. Realizing that there is more in her story that it seems, Tsubasa agrees to help her. However, Haruka and Tsuyoshi also intend to acquire the painting for their own reasons.: This episode is a tribute to Kagaku Sentai Dynaman.
29	"Mourning and Murasame"; Transliteration: "Tomurai to Murasame" (Japanese: とむらいとムラサメ)	Satoshi Morota	Toshiki Inoue	September 18, 2022
Taro receives a funeral notice for Sonoi from the Nouto Council. Taro, who decides to go alone, is invited to a different dimension, where he is surrounded by celestial maidens and receives hospitality such as baths, massages, and meals. Meanwhile, Don Murasame appears to help the Anoni, who is attacked by the Juto. Jiro tries to fight back, but the other Jiro and Murasame feel similar to each other...: This episode is a tribute to Bakuryuu Sentai Abaranger.
30	"Juto Hunters"; Transliteration: "Jūto no Karyūdo" (Japanese: ジュートのかりゅうど)	Satoshi Morota	Toshiki Inoue	September 25, 2022
Haruka's aunt is kidnapped by the Anoni, who use her as a hostage to force the Donbrothers into an alliance with the Nouto to exterminate the Juto while Tsuyoshi is in denial over learning Miho's true identity as a Juto.: This episode is a tribute to Choushinsei Flashman.
31	"The Dog Unmasked"; Transliteration: "Kao Bare Wanwan" (Japanese: かおバレわんわん)	Kyohei Yamaguchi	Toshiki Inoue	October 2, 2022
The other Donbrothers decide to unveil Inu Brother's identity. Meanwhile, Tsubasa is distraught with the striking resemblance between Miho and Natsumi and the fact that the police put a bounty on him.: This episode is a tribute to Tensou Sentai Goseiger.
32	"Duel Part 2"; Transliteration: "Kettō Sono Ni" (Japanese: けっとうソノ２)	Kyohei Yamaguchi	Toshiki Inoue	October 9, 2022
Sononi and Sonoza decide to personally defeat Taro to avenge Sonoi, who suddenly returns from the dead and acting like Taro while Don Murasame reveals the power to transform into Black Onitaijin Murasame.: This episode is a tribute to Gogo Sentai Boukenger.
33	"The Wasshoi Bird"; Transliteration: "Wasshoi na Tori" (Japanese: ワッショイなとり)	Hiroyuki Katō	Toshiki Inoue	October 16, 2022
Certain that he killed Taro in their rematch, Sonoi declares himself the Donbrothers' new leader and attempts to force the others to work with the Nouto. However, Taro returns from the dead thanks to Kaito in a new golden-armored form with a new power known as Goldon Momotaro.: This episode is a tribute to Taiyo Sentai Sun Vulcan.
34	"Natsumi Meets Me"; Transliteration: "Natsumi Mītsu Mī" (Japanese: なつみミーツミー)	Hiroyuki Katō	Toshiki Inoue	October 23, 2022
Tsubasa is certain that Miho and Natsumi are the same person and gets close to Tsuyoshi in order to win her back.: This episode is a tribute to Tokusou Sentai Dekaranger.
35	"Origami Song"; Transliteration: "Origami no Uta" (Japanese: おりがみのうた)	Ryuta Tasaki	Toshiki Inoue	October 30, 2022
After arranging Tsubasa's arrest for "kidnapping" Miho, Tsuyoshi ends up being arrested himself for harassment as the result of Miho accessing Natsumi's memories at the cost of losing the ones she made with Tsuyoshi. Tsubasa and Tsuyoshi meet at the detention center, with former requested by Haruka's aunt to investigate the Juto. Meanwhile, Jiro, who was wounded during his last fight with Murasame, is visited and treated by Rumi.: This episode is a tribute to Choujuu Sentai Liveman.
36	"Dog-Dog Battle"; Transliteration: "Inu Inu Gassen" (Japanese: イヌイヌがっせん)	Ryuta Tasaki	Toshiki Inoue	November 13, 2022
Tsubasa's search for Natsumi leads him to the Juto Forest, only to be captured with a Juto assuming his appearance. The Juto posing as Tsubasa is tailed by an unaware Tsuyoshi while Haruka meets Miho as she was acting on Natsumi's memories. Taro eventually confronts the two Juto prior to Sonoza intervening.: This episode is a tribute to Kyukyu Sentai GoGoFive.
37	"I, Ni, Za, and Shi"; Transliteration: "I to Ni to Za to Shi" (Japanese: イとニとザとシ)	Satoshi Morota	Toshiki Inoue	November 20, 2022
Sonoshi, an inspector sent by the Nouto Council, reprimands Sonoi, Sononi and Sonoza for getting distracted from their job and orders them to destroy the Donbrothers for good, but the three Nouto decide to turn to the Donbrothers instead and come with a plan to stop him.: This episode is a tribute to Seijuu Sentai Gingaman.
38	"Nonsensical Cooking"; Transliteration: "Chinpunkan Kukkingu" (Japanese: ちんぷんかんクッキング)	Satoshi Morota	Toshiki Inoue	November 27, 2022
Having settled their dispute, Tsubasa and Tsuyoshi have a diner with the other Donbrothers at a restaurant to celebrate, but the chef gets on an argument with Tsubasa and they decide to have a cooking competition.: This episode is a tribute to Denshi Sentai Denjiman.
39	"Unexpected Button Pressing"; Transliteration: "Tana kara Botan Pochi" (Japanese: たなからボタンぽち)	Kyohei Yamaguchi	Toshiki Inoue	December 4, 2022
The Donbrothers find themselves in great danger when they accidentally summon a Nouto android called Don Killer who proves himself as their most powerful foe so far.: This episode is a tribute to J.A.K.Q. Dengekitai.
40	"A Dangerous Riding Companion"; Transliteration: "Kiken na Ainori" (Japanese: キケンなあいのり)	Kyohei Yamaguchi	Toshiki Inoue	December 11, 2022
Haruka is in trouble trying to get her driving license, while Don Murasame attacks Tsubasa who is saved in the nick of time by Sononi, who stands up to protect Tsubasa out of her feelings for him.: This episode is a tribute to Mirai Sentai Timeranger.
41	"Santa Struggling"; Transliteration: "Santa Kurō Suru" (Japanese: サンタくろうする)	Katsuya Watanabe	Toshiki Inoue	December 18, 2022
It's Christmas and the Nouto take part on the festivities as part of their culture, while the Donbrothers learn from Kaito that Santa Claus was turned into a Hitotsuki and decide to help him.: This episode is a tribute to Hikari Sentai Maskman.
42	"Off-Putting Family"; Transliteration: "Donbiki Kazoku" (Japanese: ドンびきかぞく)	Katsuya Watanabe	Toshiki Inoue	December 25, 2022
The Donbrothers pretend that they are members of the same family to expose a con artist who has ruined several households, but Taro was left out because of his inability to lie, and is suspicious of their behavior.: This episode is a tribute to Himitsu Sentai Gorenger.
43	"Time-Traveling Mysteries"; Transliteration: "Toki Kake Nazo Kake" (Japanese: トキかけナゾかけ)	Ryuta Tasaki	Toshiki Inoue	January 8, 2023
Haruka decides to discover the identity of Naoki Shiina, the manga artist who falsely accused her of plagiarism, after learning that Naoki was the one who freed Tsubasa from the Juto Forest. But Haruka's search to unmask Naoki results in the manga artist revealed to be Haruka's future self from a parallel universe, who is on the run from a version of Don Murasame from her time.
44	"White Revealed, Black Revealed"; Transliteration: "Shiro Bare, Kuro Bare" (Japanese: しろバレ、くろバレ)	Ryuta Tasaki	Toshiki Inoue	January 15, 2023
Deceived by Sononi into using Don Murasame to kill Miho in order to free Natsumi, Tsubasa attacks her, which makes an angry Tsuyoshi attack him, resulting in both revealing to each other their identities as Donbrothers.: This episode is a tribute to Choudenshi Bioman and take place before the events of Avataro Sentai Donbrothers Spin-Off: This Is the Donbrothers' Roll Call! The True Avataro!? .
45	"Kaka Village, Gaga Village"; Transliteration: "Kaka-mura Gaga-mura" (Japanese: カカむらガガむら)	Hiroyuki Katō	Toshiki Inoue	January 22, 2023
Tsubasa is now officially part of the team and accompanies Taro to Jiro's hometown Kakamura to investigate the Juto, Tsubasa going on a hunch from reading one of Naoki Shiina's manuscripts. But they receive a cold welcome as they arrive to the house of Jiro's surrogate father Terasaki, a police officer who makes penguin origami. Terasaki is revealed to be the Penguin Juto, who has been moulding Jiro to become his next template as his current one is dying. But Taro takes Jiro's place instead, bearing the Don Clan's responsibility in creating the Juto. Meanwhile, after the Nouto Council give him clearance to eliminate Sonoi's group, Sonoshi returns to seek revenge with Sonogo and Sonoroku as they backup. Tsuyoshi, ending up turned into the Hitotsuki Hyakujuuki, gets captured by Sonoshi's group.: This episode is a tribute to Hyakujuu Sentai Gaoranger, also including the first appearance of the Ohsama Sentai's mecha, King-Ohger, and takes place after the events of Avataro Sentai Donbrothers Spin-Off: This Is the Donbrothers' Roll Call! The True Avataro!? .
46	"A Natsumi Night's Dream"; Transliteration: "Natsumi no Yo no Yume" (Japanese: なつみのよのゆめ)	Hiroyuki Katō	Toshiki Inoue	January 29, 2023
The Donbrothers are in another predicament with Tsuyoshi sealed again and Taro trapped in the Juto Forest with another Penguin Juto taking his form. Meanwhile, Sonoi decides to redeem himself and his group by rescuing all humans captured by the Nouto and the Juto.
47	"Don-Nou Meeting"; Transliteration: "Don'nō Kaigi" (Japanese: ドンノーかいぎ)	Satoshi Morota	Toshiki Inoue	February 5, 2023
With the Juto problem solved, the Donbrothers and the Nouto trio hold a "Don-Nou Meeting" mediated by Kaito and Jin. While Sonoi's group want to form an alliance with them to face the Nouto Council, the Donbrothers are divided on the subject. However, negotiations are interrupted when Sonoshi appears and a couple's furious discussion leads to both turning into Hitotsuki.: This episode is a tribute to Battle Fever J and Dengeki Sentai Changeman.
48	"9 Donbros"; Transliteration: "Kyū-nin no Donbura" (Japanese: 9にんのドンブラ)	Satoshi Morota	Toshiki Inoue	February 12, 2023
With the other Donbrothers absorbed by the two Hitotsuki, Shinichi and Sonoi come with a plan to rescue them. Meanwhile, Jiro comes to terms with his personal conflicts and his two personalities merge, making him whole again.: This episode is also a tribute to Battle Fever J and Dengeki Sentai Changeman, continuing the events from episode 47.
49	"Last Memories"; Transliteration: "Saigo no Omoide" (Japanese: さいごのおもいで)	Ryuta Tasaki	Toshiki Inoue	February 19, 2023
The Donbrothers/Nouto alliance has proven to be more than a match for Sonoshi's group, who come with a plan to create the most powerful Hitotsuki ever. Meanwhile, Tsuyoshi decides to forget about Miho and move on with his life but he is approached by Natsumi, whose memories were mixed with Miho's during the time she was being held at the Juto Forest.: This episode is a tribute to Ohsama Sentai King-Ohger.
50 (Final)	"We Have Made a Bond"; Transliteration: "En ga Dekita na" (Japanese: えんができたな)	Ryuta Tasaki	Toshiki Inoue	February 26, 2023
Taro approaches his companions and asks them if they had fun fighting by his side. Haruka and the others are suspicious of his behavior, unaware that he is targeted by Sonona and Sonoya, two executioners sent by the Nouto Council. It is revealed that with all the characters conflicts resolved, Taro will have his memories wiped. All the Donbrothers team up to fight Sonona and Sonoya, and Don Momotaro sacrifices himself to defeat them for good. Months later, Haruka debuts her manga based on the Donbrothers' adventures, clearing her plagiarism allegations, and she and Taro reunite.
