= Taiki Matsuno =

Japanese actor (1967–2024)

- 松野 太紀
- Born: Tatsuya Matsuno (松野 達也); October 16, 1967; Shinagawa, Tokyo, Japan
- Died: June 26, 2024 (aged 56)
- Occupations: Actor; voice actor
- Years active: 1970–2024
- Agent: Aoni Production

Taiki Matsuno (Japanese: 松野 太紀, Hepburn: Matsuno Taiki) (October 16, 1967 – June 26, 2024) was a Japanese actor and voice actor from Shinagawa, Tokyo attached to Aoni Production. His real name, as well as his former stage name, was Tatsuya Matsuno (松野 達也, Matsuno Tatsuya).

He is most well known for the roles of Hajime Kindaichi in Kindaichi Case Files, Kōga in Inuyasha, SpongeBob in the Japanese dub of SpongeBob SquarePants (starting from the first movie), Tart in Fresh Pretty Cure!, Ling Tong and Liu Shan from Dynasty Warriors and Warriors Orochi series, Agumon in Digimon Savers, and Shurikenger in Ninpu Sentai Hurricanger.

Matsuno died of a cerebral hemorrhage on June 26, 2024, at the age of 56.

== Filmography ==
=== Film ===
- Kamen Rider X: Five Riders vs. King Dark (1974)
- Ninpuu Sentai Hurricanger Shushuuto: The Movie (2002)
- Ninpuu Sentai Hurricanger vs Gaoranger (2003)
- The Hidden Blade (2004)
- About Her Brother (2010)
- Tokyo Family (2013)
- Tora-san, Wish You Were Here (2019)
- It's a Flickering Life (2021)
- Mom, Is That You?! (2023)

=== Television ===
- Kusa Moeru (1979), Senman
- Onna Taikōki (1981), Hashiba Hidetoshi (young Kobayakawa Hideaki)

=== Television animation ===
- The Adventures of the Little Prince (1978) (The Prince)
- Dragon League (1993) (Kazu)
- Sailor Moon SuperS (1995) (Pegasus)
- GeGeGe no Kitaro (1996 (90s), 2007 (00s)) (Sazae-oni (1990s, 2000s), Kurabokko (90s))
- Magical Girl Pretty Sammy (1996) (Hiroto Majima)
- Rurouni Kenshin (1996) (Nishiwaki & Beshimi)
- Kindaichi Case Files (1997) (Hajime Kindaichi)
- Bobobo-bo Bo-bobo (2003) (Tsuru Tsurina the IV)
- Boogiepop Phantom (2000) (Echoes)
- Inuyasha (2001) (Kōga)
- One Piece (2003) (Lafitte, Hildon, Trebol)
- Yu-Gi-Oh! GX (2004) (Jun Manjome)
- Futari wa Pretty Cure (2004) (Wisdom)
- Futari wa Pretty Cure Max Heart (2005) (Wisdom)
- Digimon Savers (2006) (Agumon)
- One Piece (2007) (Canpacino)
- One Piece (2008) (Hildon)
- Fresh Pretty Cure! (2009) (Tarte)
- Digimon Xros Wars (2010) (Lucemon)
- Kindaichi Case Files R (2014) (Hajime Kindaichi)
- One Piece (2014) (Trebol)
- Shichisei no Subaru (2018) (Cerinthus Ep 9–12)
- Digimon Ghost Game (2021) (MoriShellmon)
- Dark Gathering (2023) (Old Lady)
- Dragon Ball Daima (2024) (Mashim; Final role, aired posthumously)

=== Original video animation (OVA) ===
- Chameleon (1992) (Miki Hachiya)
- Magical Girl Pretty Sammy (1995) (Hiroshi)
- Mirage of Blaze (2004) (Yuzuru Narita)

=== Theatrical animation ===
- Mobile Suit Gundam F91 (1991) (Arthur Jung)
- Sakura Wars: The Movie (2001) (Kikunojo Oka)

=== Video games ===
- Mermaid Prism
- Inuyasha (Kōga)
- Tales of Destiny (PS2 remake) (Igtenos Mindarde)
- Dynasty Warriors Series, Warriors Orochi Series (Ling Tong, Liu Shan)
- Kessen (Hosokawa Tadaoki, Hideyori Toyotomi, Hideie Ukita, Hiroie Kikkawa)
- Tokimeki Memorial Girl's side 3rd Story Premium (Hasumi Tatsuya)

=== Drama CD ===
- Baito wa Maid!? 2 - Shuubun!? Senden!? (Takeru Kirisawa)
- Daisuki (Setsu Matsunari)
- D.N.Angel, A Legend of Vampire (Krad)
- Hameteyaru! (Shou Harada)
- Mirage of Blaze series 4: Washi yo, Tarega Tameni Tobu (Yuzuru Narita)
- Mizu no Kioku (Hikari Takatoo)

=== Tokusatsu ===
- Kyuukyuu Sentai GoGoFive (Spell Master Pierre)
- Hyakujuu Sentai Gaoranger (Clock Org (ep. 18))
- Ninpu Sentai Hurricanger (Sky Ninja Shurikenger (eps. 21 - 50))
- Tokusou Sentai Dekaranger (Amoreian Baacho (ep. 45))
- Mahou Sentai Magiranger (Hades Beastman Garim the Gremlin (ep. 20))
- Kamen Rider Hibiki Hyper Video (Celadon Frog)
- Juken Sentai Gekiranger (Flight Fist Confrontation Beast Crane-Fist Rūtsu (eps. 13 - 15))
- Engine Sentai Go-onger (Savage Sky Barbaric Machine Beast Vacuum Banki (ep. 18))
- Samurai Sentai Shinkenger (Ayakashi Sunasusuri (ep. 41))
- Tensou Sentai Goseiger (Yuumajuu Jogon of the Ningyo (ep. 27))
- Kamen Rider Fourze (Cygnus Zodiarts) (eps. 23 & 24))
- Zyuden Sentai Kyoryuger (Debo Batissier (ep. 5))
- Ressha Sentai ToQger (Chair Shadow (eps. 31 & 32))
- Kamen Rider Ghost (Kazai Ganma (Cubi) (eps. 19 - 28, 46 & 49))
- Kaitou Sentai Lupinranger VS Keisatsu Sentai Patranger (Yoshi Urazer (ep. 31))
- Super Sentai Strongest Battle (Sky Ninja Shurikenger (Non Credit))

=== Dubbing ===
==== Live-action ====
- 3 Ninjas: High Noon at Mega Mountain (Samuel "Rocky" Douglas (Mathew Botuchis))
- Friends (Sandy (Freddie Prinze Jr.))
- The Girl Next Door (Matthew Kidman (Emile Hirsch))
- The Tick (Arthur Everest (Griffin Newman))
- WarGames (David Lightman (Matthew Broderick))
- West Side Story (1990 TBS edition) (Baby John (Eliot Feld))
- Young Sherlock Holmes (John Watson (Alan Cox))

==== Animation ====
- SpongeBob SquarePants (1999-) - SpongeBob SquarePants
- The SpongeBob SquarePants Movie (2004) - SpongeBob SquarePants
- The SpongeBob Movie: Sponge Out of Water (2015) - SpongeBob SquarePants
- The SpongeBob Movie: Sponge on the Run (2020/2021) - SpongeBob SquarePants
- Saving Bikini Bottom: The Sandy Cheeks Movie (2024) - SpongeBob SquarePants
