= Kōhei Yamamoto (actor) =

Japanese actor (born 1980)

- 山本 康平
- Born: December 23, 1980 (age 45); Okayama Prefecture, Japan
- Occupation: Actor
- Years active: 2002–present
- Agent: Ohta Production
- Height: 179 cm (5 ft 10 in)
- Children: 2

Kōhei Yamamoto (山本 康平, Yamamoto Kōhei; born December 23, 1980, in Okayama Prefecture) is a Japanese actor who is affiliated with Ohta Production. He graduated from Komazawa University. He played the role of Kouta Bitou (Hurricane Yellow) in the 2002 Super Sentai TV series Ninpu Sentai Hurricanger.

== Biography ==
Yamamoto was born in Okayama Prefecture, on December 23, 1980. In 2002, he appeared in Ninpu Sentai Hurricanger as Kouta Bitou/Hurricane Yellow. In 2005, he starred in the film, Last Dance of August Jitsu the 5th. In 2011, Yamamoto appeared in Kaizoku Sentai Gokaiger as Kouta Bitou/Hurricane Yellow for the first time in seven years with Shun Shioya and Nao Nagasawa.

At the edge that he was co-starring in Hurricaneger, Yamamoto had a friendship with Ryuichiro Nishioka and Yujiro Shirakawa, and had activities such as working for the clothing brand Anunnaki.

In a live event Yellow Festival in Loft Plus One, he was served with Shuhei Izumi, who played Time Yellow in Mirai Sentai Timeranger. Yamamoto had also appeared in other events at Osaka Jungle. He and Izumi, had a private friendship and spent together from New Year's Eve of 2008 until New Year's Day of 2009.

== Personal life ==
Yamamoto married on January 15, 2009 and had a daughter on July 21. He also had a second daughter who was born on April 8, 2013.

== Filmography ==
=== TV series ===
Year	Title	Role	Network	Other notes
2002	Ninpu Sentai Hurricanger	Kouta Bitou/Hurricane Yellow	TV Asahi	
2006	Princess Princess D	Kaoru Natasho	TV Asahi	
2007	Kamen Rider Den-O	Masashi Aoki	TV Asahi	Episodes 25 and 26
2011	Kaizoku Sentai Gokaiger	Kouta Bitou/Hurricane Yellow	TV Asahi	Episodes 25 and 26
2012	Hayami-san to Yobareru Hi		Fuji TV	
2014	Kamen Rider Drive	Yuzo Ichikawa	TV Asahi	Episodes 5 and 6
