= Shun Shioya =

Japanese actor

- 塩谷瞬
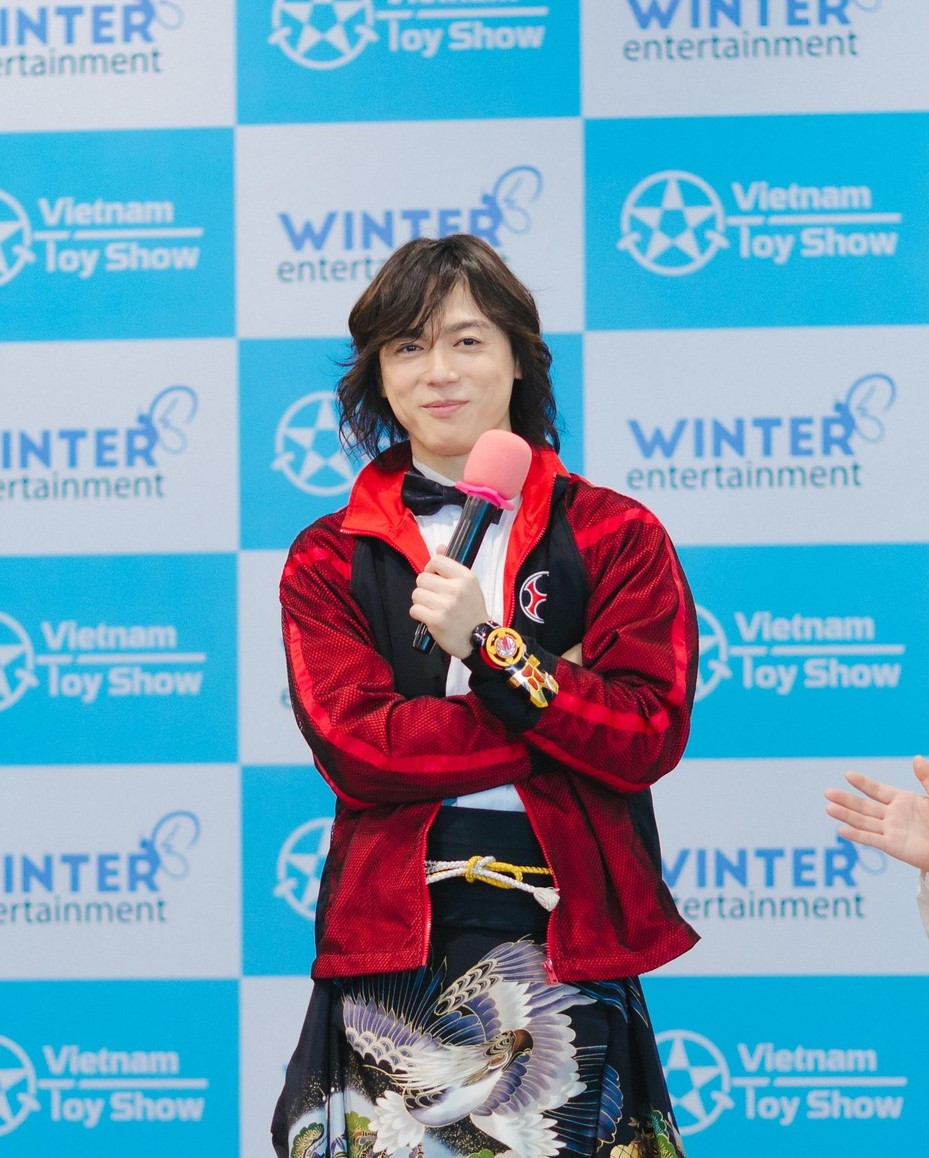
- Actor Shun Shioya at the Vietnam Toy Show event
- Born: June 7, 1982 (age 44); Kanazawa, Ishikawa Prefecture, Japan
- Occupation: Actor
- Years active: 2002–present
- Height: 177 cm (5 ft 10 in)

Shun Shioya (塩谷 瞬; born June 7, 1982 in Kanazawa, Ishikawa Prefecture, Japan) is a Japanese actor. He played the role of Yousuke Shiina (Hurricane Red) in the 2002 Super Sentai TV series Ninpu Sentai Hurricanger, and Break Through!.

== Filmography ==
=== Film ===
- Break Through! パッチギ!, Pacchigi! (2005)
- Like a Dragon (2007)
- Chameleon (2008)
- Ninpu Sentai Hurricanger: 10 Years After (2012, Toei) – Yousuke Shiina/Hurricane Red
- Haha (2017) – Takiji Kobayashi
- Rental Family – Kenta Mikami (2023)

=== Television ===
- Ninpu Sentai Hurricanger (2002) – Yousuke Shiina/Hurricane Red
- Kaizoku Sentai Gokaiger (2011) – Yousuke Shiina on Episode 25 (Pirates and Ninja) & Episode 26 (Shushūto The Special)

== Awards ==
- 2006: 29th Japan Academy Awards — Best Newcomer (for Break Through!)
