= Tokusou Sentai Dekaranger vs. Abaranger =

- Cover art of DVD.

Japanese name
- Kanji: 特捜戦隊デカレンジャーVSアバレンジャー
Transcriptions
- Revised Hepburn: Tokusō Sentai Dekarenjā tai Abarenjā
- Directed by: Tarō Sakamoto
- Written by: Naruhisa Arakawa
- Starring: Ryuji Sainei; Tsuyoshi Hayashi; Yosuke Ito; Ayumi Kinoshita; Mika Kikuchi; Tomokazu Yoshida; Koichiro Nishi; Sho Tomita; Aiko Itō; Kaoru Abe; Koutaro Tanaka; Kouen Okumura; Mako Ishino
- Narrated by: Toshio Furukawa
- Cinematography: Shingo Ōsawa
- Edited by: Ren Satō
- Music by: Kōichirō Kameyama; Kentarō Haneda with Healthy Wings
- Distributed by: Toei Company; Toei Agency; Toei Video; TV Asahi
- Release date: March 21, 2005
- Running time: 44 minutes
- Language: Japanese

Tokusou Sentai Dekaranger vs. Abaranger (特捜戦隊デカレンジャーVSアバレンジャー, Tokusō Sentai Dekarenjā Tai Abarenjā) is a V-Cinema superhero film released on March 21, 2005, featuring a crossover between the Tokusou Sentai Dekaranger and Bakuryū Sentai Abaranger casts and characters.

== Plot ==
Responding to a local disturbance, the Dekarangers apprehend AbaRed, Abare Blue and Abare Yellow, who were in the middle of chasing a raven. After interrogating the three Abarangers, the Dekarangers are ordered to bring them to the Deka Room, where they are all briefed on the shape-shifting Ginjifuan Kazak. The Abarangers explain that they were contacted by a curry shop owner friend of theirs who is being targeted by Kazak; hence their short battle with Kazak, who changed into a raven and fled while the Abarangers were arrested. Despite Doggie Kruger's suggestion to investigate the curry shop, both Super Sentai groups get into a heated argument over their methods of justice. However, when Yukito discovers a weak spot on Doggie's back and uses his chiropractic skills to fix it, Doggie suggests for Ban to team up with Ryoga.

Meanwhile, at a meeting with Kazak, Agent Abrella breaks open a red orb to unleash Trinoid #0 Saunaginnan, who had been sealed away by Mikela as he was deemed too powerful. Saunaginnan demonstrates his power by reviving the previously deleted Reversian Succubus and Speckionian Genio. However, Saunaginnan quickly wears out his energy, as he is missing two gingko nut batteries that power his abilities. Kazak takes the two revived Alienizers to retrieve the gingko nuts, giving each of them a piece of the shattered orb.

Ban and Ryoga arrive at Dino House, which has grown to become the country's largest curry shop. There, they meet the Trinoid Yatsudenwani, who has replaced Mr. Sugishita as the president of the restaurant chain. He explains to the duo that he had kept the orb that contained Saunaginnan when it was stolen, but he reveals that he has the two gingko nuts. Kazak suddenly appears and attacks Yatsudenwani before Deka Red and AbaRed interfere. However, during the fight, the clock strikes 11:00 and AbaRed suddenly leaves the fight to make a phone call to his niece Mai, who is currently taking up acting classes in Hollywood. This causes Kazak to defeat the two warriors and leave with the gingko nuts, announcing his plans to resurrect all of the deleted Alienizers and Dezumozorlya. Meanwhile, Succubus and Genio wreak havoc in two different places in town. Deka Blue, Deka Green and Deka Break assume they can easily defeat Genio by hitting his chest, but to no effect. Abare Blue pinpoints a weakness in his third vertebra, enabling the four warriors to once again delete him. Jasmine, Umeko and Ranru prepare to battle Succubus, but the Alienizer spits out a gel that clogs up their transformation devices. After distracting Succubus with some cosplaying tactics, Ranru finds a formula to dissolve the gel, enabling all three to transform and defeat Succubus. Both Genio and Succubus are reduced to the orb chunks that were in their possession. Deka Red and AbaRed once again face Kazak, but they both end up fighting each other over AbaRed's phone call. While Kazak's platoon of Anaroids massage him, AbaRed explains to Deka Red that he made a promise to call Mai before her audition. This gives Kazak the opportunity to throw both red warriors off the building. However, some last-minute teamwork brings them both back in the fight, which is suddenly interrupted by Asuka playing his harmonica. Enraged by the presence of evil on Another Earth, Abare Black attacks Kazak, who is then forced to retreat into the orb chunk he carries.

Meanwhile, at a cave, Saunaginnan becomes fully charged, causing the orb chunks to glow into a trail while Earth becomes engulfed in a thick fog. The Dekarangers and Abarangers follow the trail, but are confronted by Kazak and Saunaginnan, with the revived Ben-G, Milibar and Bon-Goblin and an army of Anaroids. Kazak sends the heroes in confusion by shape-shifting into Numa-O and Hurricane Red. The fog gets thicker as the door to hell opens in the sky, but as everyone anticipates the arrival of Dezumozorlya, Mikoto Nakadai and Topgaler come out instead. After Doggie enters the fight, both Dekarangers and Abarangers shuffle members to defeat the revived Alienizers. The heroes then use the D-Bazooka and Superior Dino Bomber to delete Kazak and Saunaginnan. Kazak, however, dodges the blast and boards his Kaijuki Pallette View while Saunaginnan is resurrected into a giant. Super Dekaranger Robo and Killer AbarenOh destroy the two giants with a combined Gatling Punch and Gatling Drill Spin attack. As a side-effect of defeating Saunaginnan, Mikoto must return to the afterlife, but not before telling Asuka to give his regards to his daughter.

Back at Deka Base, the Dekarangers and Abarangers celebrate their victory with a party hosted by Yatsudenwani, who irritates the Dekarangers with his singing. It is later on revealed that Doggie was one of Dino House's regular customers. Meanwhile, the girls and Emiri enjoy a bubble bath before Yatsudenwani barges in. They chase him around the Deka Room before everyone stops to have a group photo taken.

== Cast ==
- Banban Akaza: Ryuji Sainei
- Houji Tomasu: Tsuyoshi Hayashi
- Senichi Enari: Yosuke Ito
- Marika Reimon: Ayumi Kinoshita
- Koume Kodou: Mika Kikuchi
- Tekkan Aira: Tomokazu Yoshida
- Ryoga Hakua: Koichiro Nishi
- Yukito Sanjo: Sho Tomita
- Ranru Itsuki: Aiko Itō
- Asuka: Kaoru Abe
- Mikoto Nakadai: Koutaro Tanaka
- Swan Shiratori: Mako Ishino
- Ryunosuke Sugishita: Kouen Okumura
- Emiri Imanaka: Michi Nishijima
- Mai Hakua: Maya Banno
- Mahoro: Eri Sakurai
- Waitresses: Kasumi Suzuki, Maki Ogawa
- Succubus: Mayu Gamō

=== Voice cast ===
- Doggie Kruger: Tetsu Inada
- Bakuryū Tyrannosaurus: Takashi Nagasako
- Bakuryū Triceratops: Kōki Miyata
- Bakuryū Pteranodon: Emi Shinohara
- Bakuryū Brachiosaurus: Banjō Ginga
- Bakuryū TopGaler: Hikaru Midorikawa
- Yatsudenwani: Kyousei Tsukui
- Agent Abrella: Ryūsei Nakao
- Kazak: Ryūzaburō Ōtomo
- Saunaginnan: Kaoru Shinoda
- Bon-Goblin, Anaroids: Katsumi Shiono
- Anaroids: Yuuki Anai
- Narrator: Toshio Furukawa

== Songs ==
Ending theme

- "Midnight Dekaranger"
  - Lyrics: Shoko Fujibayashi
  - Composition: Hideaki Takatori
  - Arrangement: Kōichirō Kameyama
  - Artist: Isao Sasaki
