= List of Ultraman Arc characters =

This is the character list of 2024 Ultra Series Ultraman Arc.

== SKIP ==
SKIP (スキップ, Sukippu; Scientific Kaiju Investigation and Prevention) is an organization that conducts scientific investigations and implements precautionary measures against kaiju-related disasters. Alternate universe counterparts of Yuma, Shu, Rin, and Hiroshi are members of the GGFJ.

=== Yuma Hize ===
Yuma Hize (飛世 ユウマ, Hize Yūma) is a 23-year-old rookie investigator assigned to the Hoshimoto City Branch of SKIP. After losing his parents during Monogeros' attack on K-Day, Yuma bonded with the alien being Rution. His imagination reformed Rution into Ultraman Arc, modeled on Yuma's childhood drawing of an ideal hero.

Near the series finale, Sweed and Ze-Su attempt to sever Yuma's bond with Arc by imprisoning him in an illusion where the K-Day incident never occurred. Yuma rejects the illusion and escapes. Following Sweed’s death, Yuma and Arc depart for space to continue addressing the conflict in Star Sonia.

Yuma transforms into Ultraman Arc with the Arc Ariser (アークアライザー, Āku Araizā) and the Arc Cube (アークキューブ, Āku Kyūbu). His imagination enables Arc to creatively adapt attacks, form new weapons, and generate Arc Cubes.

Yuma Hize is portrayed by Yuki Totsuka (戸塚 有輝, Totsuka Yūki), with Paul Castro Jr. voicing him in the English dub. His childhood self is portrayed by Rihito Tachibana (立花 利仁, Tachibana Rihito).

=== Shu Ishido ===
Shu Ishido (石堂 シュウ, Ishidō Shū) is a 25-year-old special investigator dispatched by the Space Science Division (宇宙科学局, Uchū Kagaku-kyoku) of the Global Defense Force (地球防衛隊, Chikyū Bōei-tai). He is armed with the Elemagun (エレマガン, Eremagan) handgun and stationed at the Hoshimoto City Branch of SKIP, where he partners with Yuma.

Before joining SKIP, Shu lost a partner during a confrontation with Alien Repo, leading to resentment toward extraterrestrials. His outlook changes after encountering Alien Croco. Tasked by the Global Defense Force with monitoring the Onyx, Shu initially conceals his mission but gradually softens and comes to view Yuma as a true friend. He is also portrayed as a coffee enthusiast, becoming restless and easily flustered without caffeine.

Shu Ishido is portrayed by Sho Kaneta (金田 昇, Kaneta Shō), with Micah Solusod providing the English dub voice.

=== Rin Natsume ===
Rin Natsume (夏目 リン, Natsume Rin) is a 25-year-old investigator and skilled programmer working at the Hoshimoto City Branch of SKIP. She designed the YouPi series of robots, which are utilized by SKIP branches across Japan.

Rin Natsume is portrayed by Kaho Mizutani (水谷 果穂, Mizutani Kaho), with Dani Chambers voicing her in the English dub.

=== Hiroshi Ban ===
Hiroshi Ban (伴 ヒロシ, Ban Hiroshi) is the 43-year-old chief of the Hoshimoto City Branch of SKIP.

Hiroshi Ban is portrayed by Koichiro Nishi (西 興一朗, Nishi Kōichirō), with Tony Oliver providing the English dub voice.

=== YouPi ===
YouPi (ユピー, Yupī), officially YouPi the Robot (ユピーザロボット, Yupī Za Robotto), is an autonomous AI-equipped support robot assigned to the Hoshimoto City Branch of SKIP. YouPi can separate into two components: the drone-like You-bot (head) and the bipedal Pi-body (body). It can also transform into a scooter-like vehicle to transport riders.

YouPi is voiced by Yūya Hirose (広瀬 裕也, Hirose Yūya) in the original Japanese version and by Brandon McInnis in the English dub.

=== Other members ===
- Ichiro Nakamura (中村 イチロウ, Nakamura Ichirō; SP2, SP3, SP4): Former GDF officer and chief of the Fujiyama City Branch of SKIP. Later transferred to the Miyako City Branch and then the Sambon Island Branch. Portrayed by Yujiro Imamura (今村 裕次郎, Imamura Yūjirō).
- YouPi-Type AI Robots (ユピー同型AIロボット, YuPī Dōkei Ē Ai Robotto): Mass-produced support robots created by the Global Defense Force based on Rin's YouPi. Unlike the original, they lack the ability to separate into two units.
  - ChapPi (チャッピー, Chappī; SP2): A strict and uptight model stationed at the Fujiyama City Branch. Voiced by Taku Matsuo (松尾 拓, Natsuo Taku).
  - MaikoPi (まいこッピー, Maikoppī; SP3): A feminine model stationed at the Miyako City Branch, characterized by Kansai dialect speech and an obsession with Ultraman Arc. Voiced by Saki Fujimoto (藤本 沙紀, Fujimoto Saki).
  - MarinePi (マリンピー, Marinpī; SP4): A laid-back model stationed at the Sambon Island Branch. Voiced by Iori Yonahara (よなはら 伊織, Yonahara Iori).

== Ultra Warriors ==
=== Ultraman Arc ===
Ultraman Arc (ウルトラマンアーク, Urutoraman Āku) is the titular Ultra Warrior of the series and the merged form of Yuma Hize and Rution, a being of light from a distant galaxy. After Ze-Su declared war on those who opposed his plan to save Star Sonia, Rution traveled to Earth, where he bonded with Yuma following Monogelos' attack and his failure to save Yuma's family. Rution remained dormant within Yuma until his adolescence, emerging when Digelos launched an attack on Earth. From then on, Arc engaged in repeated battles against monsters and Ze-Su's forces.

When Sweed attempts to reopen the Ze-Su Gate, Rution reshapes it into the Galaxy Armor using his imagination. Although this grants Arc the ability to face stronger opponents, the armor also exposes him to pollutants from Star Sonia, weakening his connection to Yuma. After escaping Guilebaku's illusion, Yuma uses his imagination to purify the pollutants into a new Arc Cube and defeats Sweed’s Star Form. Yuma and Arc later depart Earth to continue their struggle against Ze-Su on Rution’s homeworld, learning that Star Sonia's crisis can be resolved without endangering Earth or other planets.

Arc primarily fights using energy-based techniques, with Yuma's imagination enabling unorthodox strategies and the creation of new abilities. His finishing move is Arc Finalize (アークファイナライズ, Āku Fainaraizu). His primary weapon is the Arc Eye Sword (アークアイソード, Āku Ai Sōdo).

Other forms include:

- Rution (ルティオン): Arc's original form prior to fusing with Yuma. This was also the form he used while pursued by Monogelos.
- Arc Armors (アークアーマー, Āku Āmā): Armors powered by Arc Cubes that activate when Arc's Color Timer blinks red. Their appearances and designs are based on Yuma's childhood sketches.
  - Solis Armor (ソリスアーマー, Sorisu Āmā): Sun-themed armor granting super strength and pyrokinesis at the cost of speed. Its weight also prevents flight.
  - Luna Armor (ルーナアーマー, Rūna Āmā): Moon-themed armor that enhances speed at the cost of defense. It includes the Luna Saucer (ルーナソーサー, Rūna Sōsā) gauntlet with defensive and illusionary functions.
  - Galaxy Armor (ギャラクシーアーマー, Gyarakushī Āmā): Galaxy-themed armor granting energy and space-time manipulation abilities, as well as the Arc Galaxer (アークギャラクサー, Āku Gyarakusā) formed from four Arc Feathers (アークフェザー, Āku Fezā). Created by Rution by reshaping the Ze-Su Gate, this form leaves Arc vulnerable to toxins transmitted through the gate.
  - Satur Armor (サトゥルーアーマー, Saturū Āmā): Saturn-themed armor granting cryokinesis. Exclusive to the stage show New Generation The Live during the Ultra Heroes Expo 2024 Summer Festival in Ikebukuro Sunshine City and the Ultra Heroes Expo 2024 Umeda Summer Festival.

Ultraman Arc is voiced by Masato Hagiwara (萩原 聖人, Hagiwara Masato) in Japanese, and by Christopher Wehkamp in the English dub.

=== Guil Arc ===
Dark Warrior Guil Arc (闇戦士 ギルアーク, Yami Senshi Giru Āku) is a dark clone of Ultraman Arc that appears in Ultraman Arc the Movie: The Clash of Light and Evil. Guil Arc is created by Alien Repo to support her invasion of Earth, exploiting Shu Ishido's lingering trauma over the death of his partner prior to joining SKIP. Ishido had expressed his grief through a sculpture titled Guilty, which Repo delivered to SKIP and used to trigger his inner darkness. By combining this darkness with a stolen Arc Ariser and a newly created Arc Cube, Repo forcibly transformed Ishido into Guil Arc.

Ishido ultimately regains control with Yuma's help after a mysterious stranger provides him with another Arc Ariser. Following the battle with Repodios, the Arc Ariser is returned to Yuma, and the Guil Arc Cube disappears along with most of Ishido's memories of the event.

As a clone, Guil Arc mirrors Ultraman Arc’s abilities, performing techniques in reversed stances. His finishing move is Guil Arc Finalize (ギルアークファイナライズ, Giru Āku Fainaraizu). He can also equip Arc Armors by borrowing the corresponding Arc Cubes, most notably donning the Galaxy Armor during the battle with Repodios.

=== Other Ultra Warriors ===
- Ultraman Blazar (ウルトラマンブレーザー, Urutoraman Burēzā; 19): An Ultraman from an alternate universe who, alongside Earth Garon, battled Hellnarak and its forces. When Ultraman Arc was dimensionally displaced, Blazar cooperated with him to create his own Arc Cube, allowing Yuma to channel Blazar's powers in later battles.

== Antagonists ==
=== Sweed ===
Sweed (スイード, Suīdo) is an alien devotee of Ze-Su and the primary antagonist of the series. She possesses psychic abilities, including telepathy and telekinesis, as well as multidimensional powers. Sweed commands Zadime, using it to battle Ultraman Arc and to open the Ze-Su Gate. After Zadime is defeated, she later returns alongside Guilebaku. Following Guilebaku's defeat, she transforms into Dark Galactic Warrior Sweed (暗黒宇宙戦士 スイード, Ankoku Uchū Senshi Suīdo) but is ultimately defeated by Ultraman Arc.

Sweed is portrayed by Eriko Sato (佐藤 江梨子, Satō Eriko), with Sam Slade providing her voice in the English dub.

=== Ze Su ===
Dark Space Lord Ze Su (暗黒宇宙卿 ゼ・ズー, Ankoku Uchū-kyō Ze Zū) is an alien leader of several planets within his and Rution's galaxy and is revealed to be the true culprit behind the K-Day incident. Facing the imminent destruction of his galaxy, Ze-Su created the Ze Su Gate (ゼ・ズーゲート, Ze Zū Gēto) as a means of dispersing Star Sonia's surplus energy, though at the cost of Earth's destruction. His plan was opposed by Rution's species, leading Rution to travel to Earth and seal the device. Humans later identified it as the Onyx (オニキス, Onikisu), linking its presence to K-Day and subsequent monster attacks, culminating in battles in Hoshimoto City.

Years later, Ze-Su dispatched Sweed and Zadime to reactivate the Ze-Su Gate, but it was reformed into the Galaxy Armor by Rution/Arc's imagination. Ze-Su exploited the armor's connection to Star Sonia to inject pollutants into Arc, gradually weakening him. Despite the development of a new solution to stabilize Star Sonia without harming Earth, Ze-Su continued his efforts through Sweed and Guilebaku. When these attempts failed and Yuma purified the pollutants into a new Arc Cube, Ze-Su forcibly transformed Sweed into her Alien Form as part of constructing another Ze-Su Gate. However, this plan was also thwarted by Arc.

Ze-Su's ultimate fate remains unknown, as Yuma and Rution/Arc depart Earth to confront him directly in Rution's galaxy.

=== Alien Repo ===
Evil Phantom Alien Repo (邪悪怪人 レポ星人, Jaaku Kaijin Repo Seijin) is the main antagonist of Ultraman Arc the Movie: The Clash of Light and Evil and an ally of Ze-Su's faction. She fuses with Zerogelos to form Evil Monster Repodios (邪悪怪獣 レポディオス, Jaaku Kaijū Repodiosu), but is defeated by Ultraman Arc, who uses the Solis Armor, and Guil Arc, who uses the Galaxy Armor.

Alien Repo is voiced by Miki Mizuno (水野 美紀, Mizuno Miki).

== Minor characters ==
- Akari Inui (乾 あかり, Inui Akari; 1, 3, 5, 7, 11, 20, 25, Movie): A reporter for the television station TTV. She is portrayed by Hinako Tanaka (田中 日奈子, Tanaka Hinako).
- Tetsuya Hize (飛世 テツヤ, Hize Tetsuya; 3, 25): Yuma's father, who sacrificed himself to protect his son during Monogelos' attack 16 years earlier. He is portrayed by Masato Hagiwara, who also voices Ultraman Arc.
- Takako Hize (飛世 タカコ, Hize Takako; 3, 7, 25): Yuma's mother, who sacrificed herself during Monogelos' attack 16 years earlier. She is portrayed by Keiko Maki (牧 佳子, Maki Keiko).

== Monsters and aliens ==
- Galactic Beast Digelos (宇宙獣 ディゲロス, Uchū-jū Digerosu; 1, 3): A subspecies of Monogelos and Ultraman Arc's first opponent. Its energy-based abilities posed difficulties for Arc, but it was ultimately destroyed with Arc Finalize (Wave Shoot).
- Ancient Monster Gomora (古代怪獣 ゴモラ, Kodai Kaijū Gomora; 1): One of the monsters Arc faced on Earth prior to battling Shagong. First appeared in episode 26 of Ultraman.
- Skull Monster Red King II (どくろ怪獣 レッドキング(二代目), Dokuro Kaijū Reddo Kingu (Ni-daime); 1, SP3): Among the monsters encountered on Earth before Shagong. Another Red King II was noted among numerous monsters appearing in Japan. First appeared in episode 25 of Ultraman.
- Armored Shell Monster Shagong (鎧甲殻獣 シャゴン, Yoroi Kōkaku-jū Shagon; 1, 6, Movie): A carnivorous 5 m creature known to prey on livestock. After being parasitized by Oo-ze, it grew to giant size following forced consumption of stalactites and growth hormone, but was killed by Arc Finalize. In episode 6, three naturally 50 m Shagongs attacked the Akebono Inn; two were destroyed by Arc using the Solis Sword Explosion and the Arc Giga Barrier in combination with Arc Exa Slash. In the film, two Shagongs attacked Doglf and were killed by it with assistance from Arc's Luna Saucer and Doglf's energy breath.
- Extraterrestrial Parasitic Organism Oo-ze (宇宙寄生生物 ウーズ, Uchū Kisei Seibutsu Ūzu; 1): A parasitic lifeform that feeds on calcium-based minerals and possesses monsters as hosts. Arriving via Monogelos, Oo-ze later proliferated on Earth. The death of the swarm's progenitor caused its spawn to perish.
- Ancient Monster Leodo (古代怪獣 リオド, Kodai Kaijū Riodo; 2): (Note: Leodo is written in kanji as 里汚土.) An ancient monster that lived in swamps and was sealed underground about 1,200 years ago by villagers using a concoction of 88 herbs. Excavation work reawakened it in the present day. Arc defeated Leodo by drilling with Arc Exa Slash and finishing with Arc Finalize.
- Galactic Beast Monogelos (宇宙獣 モノゲロス, Uchū-jū Monogerosu; 3): Sent by Ze Su to stop Rution from sealing the Ze Su Gate. After pursuing Rution through the portal, it was killed on Earth by Rution Finish. Its exposed Monohorn (モノホーン, Monohōn) later became the source of Oo-ze's assault on Hoshimoto City.
- Electro Rat Monster Nezutron (電鼠怪獣 ネズドロン, Denso Kaijū Nezudoron; 4): A rat of the species Electricamus nipponicus bearing bacteria that allow it to feed on electricity. It nested at Kawami Heavy Industries' central power plant; striking the main Daimode generator caused it to grow to giant size. In this form it had a hardened skull and could generate an electromagnetic barrier, which failed once the generator link was severed. Arc used the Solis Armor for the first time, fracturing its skull with Solis Knuckle Impact and finishing it with Arc Finalize.
- Giant Cetacean Beast Livyjira (巨鯨水獣 リヴィジラ, Kyogei Suijū Rivijira; 5): A whale-like monster awakened after a fossil discovery in the Daiko Mountain Ridge. It tunneled underground and used water and salt it produced to flood the mountain, turning it into a saltwater lake. Arc defeated it with Arc Finalize.
- Mushroom-Hunting Alien Alien Croco (茸狩宇宙人 クロコ星人, Kinoko-gari Uchūjin Kuroko Seijin; 6, 11, 12): A friendly alien who assumes the human identity Numata (ヌマタ). Abandoned by partners on Earth during K-Day, he worked at the Akebono Inn before being transferred by the GDF. Voiced by Akira 100% (アキラ100%, Akira Hyaku-pāsento) (who also portrays his human form).
- Lightning Bird Monster Raibasser (稲妻怪鳥 ライバッサー, Inazuma Kaichō Raibassā; SP2): Cited as among the monsters that appeared in Japan. First appeared in episode 11 of Ultraman Decker.
- Molten Iron Monster Demaaga (熔鉄怪獣 デマーガ, Yōtetsu Kaijū Demāga; SP2): Cited among monsters appearing in Japan. First appeared in episode 1 of Ultraman X.
- Underground Monster Gudon (地底怪獣 グドン, Chitei Kaijū Gudon; SP2): Cited among monsters appearing in Japan. First appeared in episode 5 of Return of Ultraman.
- Raptorial Monster Guebasser (猛禽怪獣 グエバッサー, Mōkin Kaijū Guebassā; SP2): Cited among monsters appearing in Japan. First appeared in episode 5 of Ultraman R/B.
- Immobile Monster Houlinga (不動怪獣 ホオリンガ, Fudō Kaijū Hōringa; SP2): Cited among monsters appearing in Japan. First appeared in episode 10 of Ultraman X.
- Magnetic Monster Antlar (磁力怪獣 アントラー, Jiryoku Kaijū Antorā; SP2): Cited among monsters appearing in Japan. First appeared in episode 7 of Ultraman.
- Ancient Underground Beast Oka-Gubila (古代地底獣 オカグビラ, Kodai Chitei-jū Okagubira; SP2, 11, 12): Briefly surfaced in Fujiyama City before returning underground. Another Oka-Gubila later appeared in Hoshimoto City, battling Arc until Givas intervened. Oka-Gubila attacked Givas multiple times but was repelled by its energy drill; after further clashes involving Arc, it ultimately retreated underground. First appeared in episode 4 of Ultraman Trigger: New Generation Tiga.
- Zero Fighter Monster Bird Barevadon (ゼロ戦怪鳥 バレバドン, Zerosen Kaichō Barebadon; SP2): Flew over Fujiyama City. First appeared in episode 41 of Ultraman 80.
- Abyssal Monster Peter (深海怪獣 ピーター, Shinkai Kaijū Pītā; SP2, SP3, SP4): (Note: Called Abyssal Monster Alligatortois (深海怪獣 アリゲトータス, Shinkai Kaijū Arigetōtasu).) Kept in Ichiro Nakamura's home aquarium after he caught it. First appeared in episode 26 of Ultra Q.
- Scorching Monster Homger (灼熱怪獣 ホムガー, Shakunetsu Kaijū Homugā; 7): An ancient tiger-like species in legends credited with triggering eruptions in non-volcanic regions by self-detonating to pass life energy to offspring. A Homger caused a severe heatwave and hydrogen sulfide geysers, defeated Arc by draining his energy and attacking with flames, then slept. Upon reawakening for birth, Arc used the Luna Armor for the first time, creating a tornado that allowed a safe detonation.
- Anju (杏樹; 7): A spirit associated with Homgers who seeks human–Homger coexistence. Her weakening spiritual force renders her invisible to ordinary humans and hinders communication. Portrayed by Coco Masui (増井 湖々, Masui Koko).
- Virtual Monster Internet Kanegon (V(ヴァーチャル)怪獣 インターネット・カネゴン, Vācharu Kaijū Intānetto Kanegon; 8): An AI variant of Kanegon from episode 15 of Ultra Q. Voiced by Fumiko Orikasa (折笠 富美子, Orikasa Fumiko).
- Transparent Monster Neronga (透明怪獣 ネロンガ, Tōmei Kaijū Neronga; 9): A monster that feeds on electricity and shares a common ancestor with Pagos, Gabora, and Magular. Drawn to Hoshimoto City after a fight with Pagos, it was put to sleep by a large electrical discharge, later awakening for a rematch before allying with Pagos against Arc. Killed by Arc's Luna Sword Crescent. First appeared in episode 3 of Ultraman.
- Subterranean Monster Pagos (地底怪獣 パゴス, Chitei Kaijū Pagosu; 9): Feeds on radiation and shares a common ancestor with Neronga, Gabora, and Magular. After initially battling Neronga, it allied with it against Arc and was killed by Arc's Luna Sword Crescent. First appeared in episode 18 of Ultra Q.
- Noise Monster Noiseler (騒音怪獣 ノイズラー, Sōon Kaijū Noizurā; 10): A space monster attracted to Earth by the radio waves from Kazuo Kizaki's radio. After clashing with the GDF using eye beams and echolocation, it fought Arc on land and in the air. The sound of Arc's Color Timer caused it pain; Arc then used Arc Exa Slash to propel it into deep space. First appeared in episode 7 of Ultraman 80.
- Fio (フィオ; 10): The last survivor of her species and a friend of Kazuo. Voiced by Ayane Sakura (佐倉 綾音, Sakura Ayane).
- Mechanical Colossus Givas (機械巨像 ギヴァス, Kikai Kyozō Givasu; 11, 12, 21): An autonomous robot created by the Alien Meguma to seek a replacement for Mujari (ムジャーリ, Mujāri), their planet's waning energy source. Its name means "enemy" by day and "friend" by night. Arriving via a wormhole during Arc's fight with Oka-Gubila, it copied opponents' techniques (e.g., Oka-Gubila's Die-Hard Drill, Arc's Arc Exa Slash). After multiple clashes, Yuma—having discovered Meguma's message inside the cockpit—convinced Givas to leave Earth and travel to the Moon. The GDF later learned Givas was researching the Ze Su Gate (Onyx).
- Alien Meguma (メグマ星人, Meguma Seijin; 12): (Note: Credited under Master (マスター, Masutā).) The last survivor of his species, found deceased in Givas's cockpit. Voiced by Shunichi Maki (真木 駿一, Maki Shun'ichi).
- Galactic Beast Zadime (宇宙獣 ザディーメ, Uchū-jū Zadīme; 14, 15): A monster deployed by Sweed to destroy the Ze Su Gate's seal. After battling Arc (including Luna Armor), it reappeared to attack the Onyx. Following a hard fight, Arc defeated it using the newly created Galaxy Armor, formed after absorbing the Onyx; this form granted portal-creation abilities and the Arc Galaxer weapon.
- Oil Monster Takkong (オイル怪獣 タッコング, Oiru Kaijū Takkongu; 15, SP4): Attacked New York after being awakened by the Onyx during K-Day. Another Takkong was listed among monsters appearing in Japan. First appeared in episode 1 of Return of Ultraman.
- Space Monster Eleking (宇宙怪獣 エレキング, Uchū Kaijū Erekingu; 15): Appeared in a lake near Guilin after being awakened by the Onyx during K-Day. First appeared in episode 3 of Ultraseven.
- Winged Monster Chandlar (有翼怪獣 チャンドラー, Yūyoku Kaijū Chandorā; 15): Attacked Pisa after being awakened by the Onyx during K-Day. First appeared in episode 8 of Ultraman.
- Great Space Monster Bemstar (宇宙大怪獣 ベムスター, Uchū Dai Kaijū Bemusutā; 15): Also attacked Pisa after awakening during K-Day. First appeared in episode 18 of Return of Ultraman.
- Freezing Monster Guigass (冷凍怪獣 ギガス, Reitō Kaijū Gigasu; SP3): Cited among monsters appearing in Japan. First appeared in episode 25 of Ultraman.
- Centipede Monster Mukadender (百足怪獣 ムカデンダー, Mukade Kaijū Mukadendā; SP3): Cited among monsters appearing in Japan. First appeared in episode 26 of Ultraman Taro.
- Rock Monster Sadola (岩石怪獣 サドラ, Ganseki Kaijū Sadora; SP3): Cited among monsters appearing in Japan. First appeared in episode 3 of Return of Ultraman.
- Volcanic Bird Monster Birdon (火山怪鳥 バードン, Kazan Kaichō Bādon; SP3): Cited among monsters appearing in Japan. First appeared in episode 18 of Ultraman Taro.
- Underground Monster Magular (地底怪獣 マグラー, Chitei Kaijū Magurā; SP3): Cited among monsters appearing in Japan. First appeared in episode 8 of Ultraman.
- Vision Monster Mogusion (幻視怪獣 モグージョン, Genshi Kaijū Mogūjon; 16): First appeared in episode 16 of Ultraman Blazar.
- Space Samurai Zangill (宇宙侍 ザンギル, Uchū-zamurai Zangiru; 16, 17): First appeared in episode 17 of Ultraman Blazar. Voiced by Mitsuru Karahashi (唐橋 充, Mitsuru Karahashi).
- Abyssal Monster Gedos (深海怪獣 ゲードス, Shinkai Kaijū Gēdosu; 17): First appeared in episode 2 of Ultraman Blazar.
- Coleopteran Monster Taganular (甲虫怪獣 タガヌラー, Kōchū Kaijū Taganurā; 17, 18): First appeared in episode 3 of Ultraman Blazar.
- Space Crustacean Monster Bazanga (宇宙甲殻怪獣 バザンガ, Uchū Kōkaku Kaijū Bazanga; 18, 19): First appeared in episode 1 of Ultraman Blazar.
- Infernal Dark Shogun Beast Hellnarak (冥府闇将軍獣 ヘルナラク, Meifu Yami Shōgun-jū Herunaraku; 18, 19): Appears in the Blazar crossover arc.
- Special Tactical Armored Kaiju Earth Garon (特戦獣 アースガロン, Tokusenjū Āsu Garon; 18, 19): A giant robot operated by SKaRD in an alternate universe. In this series it fights Hellnarak, then teams with Blazar against Bazanga. First appeared in episode 2 of Ultraman Blazar.
- Space Life Form Supekkio (宇宙生命体 スペッキオ, Uchū Seimei-tai Supekkio; 20): A crystal-like space organism with mimicry abilities, likely feeding on glass and silicates. It disguised itself as Gomess (SP) until Arc exposed its true form.
  - Ancient Monster Gomess (SP) (古代怪獣 ゴメス(SP), Kodai Kaijū Gomesu (Esu Pī); 20): (Note: SP is an abbreviation for Singular Point.) Supekkio's mimicry of Gomess (S), which first appeared in episode 1 of Ultra Galaxy Mega Monster Battle: Never Ending Odyssey. Using this form, it climbed Mt. Ratsuno. GDF tank attacks with citronella acid (a Gomess weakness) proved ineffective. It then used anti-gravity waves to fly toward Okami Town, where it fought Arc. Arc revealed the disguise by cutting the false skin with the Arc Eye Sword and reflecting Gomess (SP)'s beams to superheat the blade, which he used to destroy the mimicry.
- Red Sphere (赤い球, Akai Tama; 21): A pinnacle of material civilization able to grant any wish. Concluding it should not exist due to users' greed, it appeared to Aoi Shiba (a friend of Rin) and granted her wishes, transforming into Dori, Zandrias, and King of Mons. After King of Mons was defeated, it asked Aoi to wish for its destruction; she did so, and the sphere dissolved into light. First appeared in Ultraman Gaia: The Battle in Hyperspace.
  - Dream Bird Monster Baby Zandrias "Dori" (夢咲き鳥怪獣 ベビーザンドリアス ドリちゃん, Yumesaki-dori Kaijū Bebī Zandoriasu Dori-chan; 21): The form the Red Sphere took when Aoi wished to meet the "Dream Bird." It helped Aoi write her story and later grew into a juvenile. Before dissolving, the Sphere assumed this form once more. The species first appeared in episode 4 of Ultraman 80; this form first appeared in episode 1 of Ultraman Taiga.
  - Dream Bird Monster Zandrias "Dori" (夢咲き鳥怪獣 ザンドリアス ドリちゃん, Yumesaki-dori Kaijū Zandoriasu Dori-chan; 21): The juvenile form made concealment difficult. After the GDF opened fire, revealing its true nature, Aoi wished for it to become King of Mons to destroy the world. The species first appeared in episode 4 of Ultraman 80.
  - Strongest Combined Monster King of Mons (最強合体獣 キングオブモンス, Saikyō Gattai-jū Kingu Obu Monsu; 21): The Red Sphere assumed this form per Aoi's wish. It devastated the city until Arc intervened; realizing her mistake, Aoi pleaded for help, prompting Givas to descend from the Moon. After a prolonged battle, Arc destroyed King of Mons with Galaxer Finalize while Givas restrained it. First appeared in Ultraman Gaia: The Battle in Hyperspace.
- Paradise Dreamer Man in the White Mask (楽園夢想人 白い仮面の男, Rakuen Musō-nin Shiroi Kamen no Otoko; 22): A mysterious humanoid who discovered the Pillar and fashioned his mask from it. He sought to create a paradise without negative emotions by using the Pillar, ultimately fusing with it and dying when it was destroyed. Voiced by Masane Tsukayama (津嘉山 正種, Tsukayama Masane).
- Relic of the Paradise Dream Pillar (楽園夢想遺構 柱, Rakuen Musō Ikō Hashira; 22): An ancient object designed to erase sources of negative emotion, visible only to those aware of it. Discovered and used by the Man in the White Mask. After fusing with him, it attempted to kill Arc with a force field, but was destroyed by Arc Finalize.
- Galactic Beast Trigelos (宇宙獣 トリゲロス, Uchū-jū Torigerosu; 23): A Monogelos subspecies combining features of Monogelos and Digelos, created solely to kill Ultraman Arc. Abilities include great physical strength, energy beams, arm-mounted light swords, energy drill constructs, and the Trigelos Hoop, a construct used for flight and attacks. Destroyed by Arc Finalize after a prolonged battle.
- Biorno (ビオルノ, Bioruno; 23, 24): An entity who shares Rution's objective. Voiced by Chikahiro Kobayashi (小林 親弘, Kobayashi Chikahiro).
- Underground Monster Mogrudon (地中怪獣 モグルドン, Chichū Kaijū Mogurudon; SP4): Cited among monsters appearing in Japan. First appeared in episode 6 of Ultraman Cosmos.
- Subterranean Monster Telesdon (地底怪獣 テレスドン, Chitei Kaijū Teresudon; SP4): Cited among monsters appearing in Japan. First appeared in episode 22 of Ultraman.
- Ferocious Monster Giestron (凶猛怪獣 ギーストロン, Kyōmō Kaijū Gīsutoron; SP4): Cited among monsters appearing in Japan. First featured at Ultraman Festival 2019.
- Primordial Amphibian Ragon (海底原人 ラゴン, Kaitei Genjin Ragon; SP4): Cited among monsters appearing in Japan. First appeared in episode 21 of Ultra Q.
- Sea Monster King Guesra (海獣 キングゲスラ, Kaijū Kingu Gesura; SP4): Cited among monsters appearing in Japan. Appears in Superior Ultraman 8 Brothers.
- Dream Beast Guilebaku (夢幻獣 ギルバグ, Mugen-jū Girubagu; 24, 25): The last of Ze Su's monsters, used by Sweed to trap Yuma in an illusion suggesting the past 16 years were a dream; Shu eventually found him. Guilebaku then emerged from the same portal as Trigelos and attacked SKIP headquarters. Pollutants in Earth's atmosphere—transmitted by Ze Su—weakened Arc and caused the Galaxy Armor to malfunction, allowing Guilebaku to subdue him and induce sleep. Within the dreamscape, Yuma overcame the narrative and transformed into Arc, but Guilebaku manipulated the environment to restrain him. Shu entered the dome barrier and destroyed the belly crystal with a device firing Onyxium Particles, collapsing the barrier and enabling GDF attacks in both realities. Arc escaped, activated the Galaxy Armor, and destroyed Guilebaku in the dream, killing its real-world body as well.

Film-exclusive

- Space Sage Alien Diggle "Sascal" (宇宙賢者 ディグル星人 サスカル, Uchū Kenja Diguru Seijin Sasukaru): An eccentric yet benevolent alien who can manipulate time. He set Yuma three trials to judge his worthiness as a hero; when Guil Arc (the final trial) appeared, Sascal enlisted Yuma's future self to lend an Arc Ariser, by which point Sascal had become a trusted friend. Portrayed by Naoto Takenaka (竹中 直人, Takenaka Naoto).
- Dog-Wolf Monster Doglf (犬狼怪獣 ドグルフ, Kenrō Kaijū Dogurufu): A friendly monster nicknamed "Mugon" (ムーゴン, Mūgon) by Motoki Mukawa, inhabiting the Mt. Akiyoshi region. Near the end of its lifespan, it defeated two Shagongs with Arc's help before dying of old age.
- Interstellar Parasitic Plant Gartura (宇宙寄生植物 ガチュラ, Uchū Kisei Shokubutsu Gachura): A parasitic plant capable of possessing humans. Shot and killed by Rin.
- Galactic Beast Zerogelos (宇宙獣 ゼロゲロス, Uchū-jū Zerogerosu): A Monogelos subspecies used by Alien Repo. It fused with Alien Repo to become Repodios.
