= Bakuryū Sentai Abaranger 20th: The Unforgivable Fury =

Bakuryū Sentai Abaranger 20th: The Unforgivable Abare
- Theatrical release poster
- 爆竜戦隊アバレンジャー20th 許されざるアバレ
- Directed by: Hisashi Kimura
- Screenplay by: Naruhisa Arakawa
- Based on: Super Sentai by Saburo Yatsude
- Starring: Koichiro Nishi; Sho Tomita; Aiko Itō; Kaoru Abe; Koutaro Tanaka
- Music by: Kentarō Haneda with Healthy Wings
- Production company: Toei Company
- Distributed by: Toei Company, Ltd.
- Release date: September 1, 2023
- Running time: 59 minutes
- Country: Japan
- Language: Japanese

Bakuryū Sentai Abaranger 20th: The Unforgivable Abare (爆竜戦隊アバレンジャー20th 許されざるアバレ, Bakuryū Sentai Abarenjā Tuentīsu Yurusarezaru Abare) is a 2023 Japanese superhero tokusatsu V-Cinema film which celebrates the 20th anniversary of Bakuryū Sentai Abaranger upon which the movie is based on. The film received a limited theatrical release on September 1, 2023, its DVD and Blu-ray release being scheduled on March 27, 2024.

== Plot ==
20 years have passed since the Abarangers saved Another Earth and Dino Earth from the Evoliens, but the lives of Ryoga, Yukito, Ranru and their friends are disturbed by a new dangerous threat to Earth in the form of a new Trinoid seeking the restoration of the Evoliens. The Abarangers also deal with how the public negatively reacts to their acts of heroism along with the resurrection of their nemesis-turned ally Dr. Mikoto Nakadai.

== Cast ==
- Ryoga Hakua (伯亜 凌駕, Hakua Ryōga): Koichiro Nishi (西 興一朗, Nishi Kōichirō)
- Yukito Sanjo (三条 幸人, Sanjō Yukito): Sho Tomita (富田 翔, Tomita Shō)
- Ranru Itsuki (樹 らんる, Itsuki Ranru): Aiko Itō (いとう あいこ, Itō Aiko)
- Asuka (アスカ): Kaoru Abe (阿部 薫, Abe Kaoru)
- Mikoto Nakadai (仲代 壬琴, Nakadai Mikoto): Koutaro Tanaka (田中 幸太朗, Tanaka Kōtarō)
- Emiri Sanjyo (三条 笑里, Sanjō Emiri): Michi Nishijima (西島 未智, Nishijima Michi)
- Mai Hakua (伯亜 舞, Hakua Mai): Maya Banno (坂野 真弥, Banno Maya)
- Mr. Yokota (横田さん, Yokota-san): Taro Suwa (諏訪 太朗, Suwa Tarō)
- Aoi Iota (五百田 葵, Iota Aoi): Karen Otomo (大友 花恋, Ōtomo Karen)
- Hazuki Akiya (秋谷 葉月, Akiya Hazuki): Fuyuna Asakura (朝倉 ふゆな, Asakura Fuyuna)
- Soichiro Taharahara (田原々 聡一郎, Taharahara Sōichirō): Gota Tate (殺陣 剛太, Tate Gōta)
- MC: Yui Watanabe (渡邉 唯, Watanabe Yui)
- Themselves: Silk Road (シルクロード, Shiruku Rōdo), Ndaho (ンダホ)
- Hiroshi Watarigome (渡米 ヒロシ, Watarigome Hiroshi): Hiroshi Watari (渡 洋史, Watari Hiroshi)
- Bakuryū Tyrannosaurus (爆竜 ティラノサウルス, Bakuryū Tiranosaurusu; Voice): Takashi Nagasako (長嶝 高士, Nagasako Takashi)
- Bakuryū Triceratops (爆竜 トリケラトプス, Bakuryū Torikeratopusu; Voice): Kōki Miyata (宮田 幸季, Miyata Kōki)
- Bakuryū Pteranodon (爆竜 プテラノドン, Bakuryū Puteranodon; Voice): Emi Shinohara (篠原 恵美, Shinohara Emi)
- Bakuryū Brachiosaurus (爆竜 ブラキオサウルス, Bakuryū Burakiosaurusu; Voice): Banjō Ginga (銀河 万丈, Ginga Banjō)
- Bakuryū TopGaler (爆竜 トップゲイラー, Bakuryū Toppugeirā; Voice): Hikaru Midorikawa (緑川 光, Midorikawa Hikaru)
- Trinoid #12 Yatsudenwani (トリノイド第12号 ヤツデンワニ, Torinoido Dai Jū-ni-gō Yatsudenwani; Voice): Kyōsei Tsukui (津久井 教生, Tsukui Kyōsei) (Note: Kyōsei Tsukui's final role for the Super Sentai franchise prior to his retirement.)
- Trinoid #24 Abarengecko (トリノイド第24号 アバレンゲッコー, Torinoido Dai Nijū-yon-gō Abarengekkō; Voice): Tomokazu Seki (関 智一, Seki Tomokazu)
