= Kasumi Suzuki =

Japanese actress (born 1990)

- 鈴木 かすみ
- Born: June 21, 1990 (age 35); Kanagawa, Japan
- Occupation: Actress
- Years active: 2001–present
- Agent: Evergreen Entertainment (2001-2015)
- Notable work: Bakuryū Sentai Abaranger; Threads of Destiny

Kasumi Suzuki (鈴木 かすみ, Suzuki Kasumi; born June 21, 1990) is a Japanese actress. She is best known for playing Lije in Bakuryū Sentai Abaranger, Naomi in Drama 8 Geinōsha, Akemi Nagase in Kaidan Shin Mimibukuro: Yūrei Mansion, Yuri Nakanishi in Threads of Destiny, and Yurine in Karas.

== Filmography ==
=== Theatre ===
Year	Title	Role	Note
2001	Sera Myu: Tanjou Ankoku No Princess Black Lady + (Kaiteban)	Manna	—
2002	Ojamajo Kids	Doremi Harukaze	

=== Television ===
Year	Title	Role	Network	Note
2003	Bakuryū Sentai Abaranger	Lije/Kasumi	TV Asahi	Supporting role
2004	Daisuki! Itsutsu-go 6	Yuka Takeuchi	TBS	Supporting role
2007	Detective Academy Q	Mari Asabuki	Nippon TV	Episodes 4 and 5
2007	Kamen Rider Kabuto	Keiko Kobayashi	TV Asahi	Episodes 37 and 38
2009	Drama 8 Geinōsha	Naomi	NHK	Lead role
2008	Threads of Destiny	Yuri Nakanishi	Fuji TV	Supporting role
2011	Kamen Rider Fourze	Yayoi Tokuda/Coma Zodiarts	TV Asahi	Episodes 25 and 26

=== Films ===
Year	Title	Role	Note
2003	Bakuryū Sentai Abaranger Deluxe: Abare Summer is Freezing Cold!	Lije	—
2004	Tokusou Sentai Dekaranger vs. Abaranger	Special waitress	Direct-to-DVD; cameo
2005	Zoo	—	"Hidamari no Uta" segment; voice only
2008	GeGeGe no Kitarō	Ai Tanaka	Supporting role
2008	Threads of Destiny	Yuri Nakanishi	Supporting role
2010	Kaidan Shin Mimibukuro: Yūrei Mansion	Akemi Nagase	"Tsukimono" segment; lead role
2012	Kamen Rider Fourze the Movie: Space, Here We Come!	Yayoi Tokuda	Cameo

=== OVA ===
Year	Title	Role	Note
2006	Karas	Yurine	Lead role; voice in OVA
