= Mei Kurokawa =

Japanese actress and singer

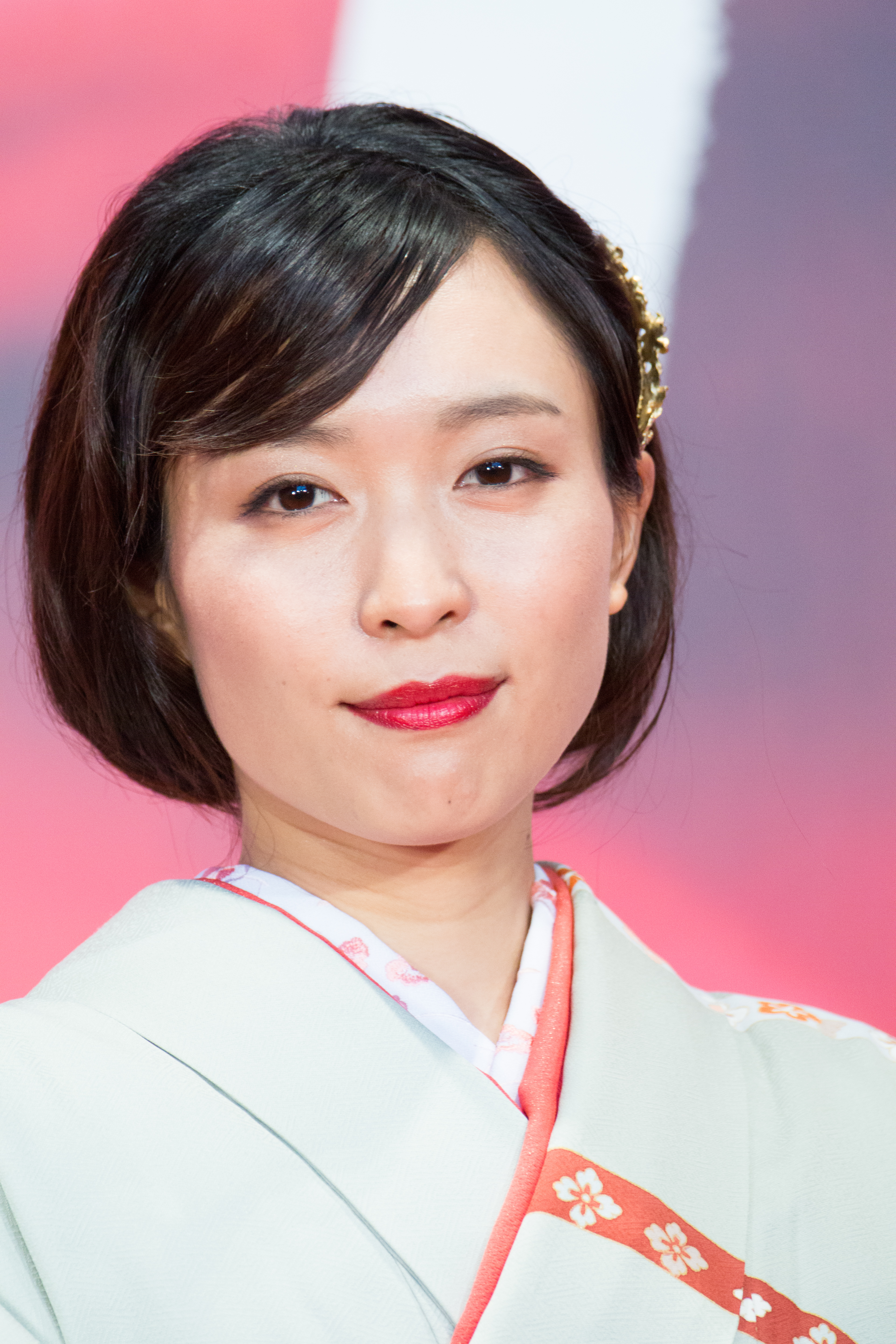
- Born: 13 May 1987 (age 39); Nishitōkyō, Tokyo, Japan
- Occupations: Actress, singer
- Years active: 1993–present

Mei Kurokawa (黒川芽以, Kurokawa Mei; born on 13 May 1987 in Nishitōkyō, Tokyo, Japan) is a Japanese actress and singer. Her given name Mei originates from her birth month (May) in English. She has been frequently featured in many Japanese dramas and Kaidan Shin Mimibukuro: Yūrei Mansion films.

== Filmography ==
=== Film ===
- Kaidan Shin Mimibukuro: Yūrei Mansion The Haunted Apartments (怪談新耳袋劇場版 幽霊マンション) (2005)
- Keitai Deka The Movie (ケータイ刑事 THE MOVIE バベルの塔の秘密〜銭形姉妹への挑戦状) (2006)
- Nekonade (ネコナデ) (2008)
- Boys on the Run (2010)
- Sweet Little Lies (2010)
- Yakuza Weapon (2011)
- Killers (2014)
- Our Family (2014)
- Riding the Breeze (2014) 南風 (電影)
- Ninja Hunter (2015)
- Nijūrokuya machi (2017)
- 21st Century Girl (2019)
- Ito (2021)
- To the Supreme! (2022), Nanase Kitagawa

=== Television ===
- Carnation (2011, NHK)
