= Tsuyoshi Hayashi =

Japanese actor (born 1982)

- 林 剛史
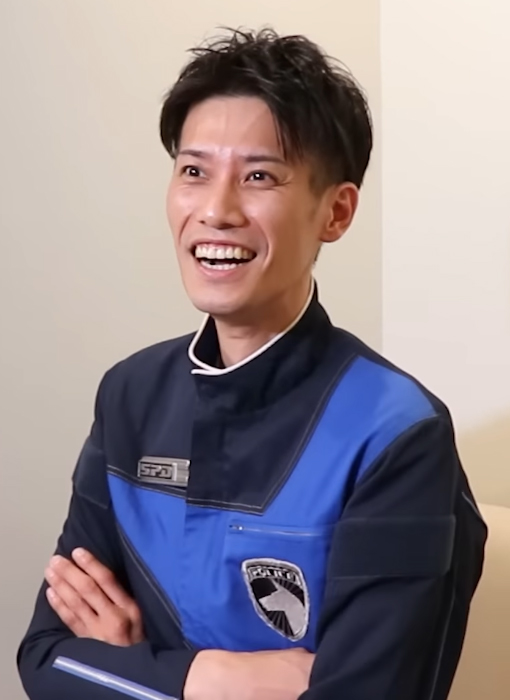
- Hayashi in 2022
- Born: August 15, 1982 (age 42); Kobe, Hyogo, Japan
- Occupation: Actor
- Years active: 2003-present
- Height: 180 cm (5 ft 11 in)

Tsuyoshi Hayashi (林 剛史, Hayashi Tsuyoshi, born August 15, 1982 in Kobe, Japan) is a Japanese actor. He is best known for his role as Hoji Tomasu/Deka Blue in the 2004 TV series Tokusou Sentai Dekaranger.

== Filmography ==
=== TV series ===
- Kunimitsu no Matsuri (KTV, 2003, ep10-11)
- Marusa!! (Fuji TV, 2003, ep9)
- Onsen e Iko! 4 (TBS, 2003)
- Sky High (TV Asahi, 2003, ep7)
- Stand Up!! (TBS, 2003, ep4,6)
- Hamano Shizuka wa Jiken ga Osuki (Fuji TV, 2004, ep2)
- Tokusou Sentai Dekaranger (TV Asahi, 2004- 2005 ) – Hoji Tomasu/Deka Blue
- Astro Kyudan (TV Asahi, 2005) – Uno Kyuichi
- H2 (TBS, 2005) – Tsukigata
- Tantei Boogie (探偵ブギ) (TV Tokyo, 2006, ep3)
- Galileo (Fuji TV, 2007) – Murase Kensuke
- Kamen Rider Den-O (TV Asahi, 2007, ep30)
- Onna Keiji Mizuki 2 (TV Asahi, 2007, ep11)
- Shukan Akagawa Jiro (週刊 赤川次郎) (TV Tokyo, 2007, ep6-10)
- ROOKIES (TBS, 2008, ep6-8,10-11)
- Egoist (Fuji TV, 2009)
- Mr. Brain (TBS, 2009, ep7

=== Film ===
- Tokusou Sentai Dekaranger The Movie: Full Blast Action (2004) – Hoji Tomasu/Deka Blue
- Tokusou Sentai Dekaranger vs. Abaranger (2005) – Hoji Tomasu/Deka Blue
- Mahou Sentai Magiranger vs. Dekaranger (2006) – Hoji Tomasu/Deka Blue
- Shiawase no Switch (2006)
- Giniro no Season (2007)
- Tsubaki Sanjuro (2007)

=== Dubbing ===
- Power Rangers S.P.D. (2005, 2011) – Sky Tate/SPD Blue Ranger
