= Zyuden Sentai Kyoryuger vs. Go-Busters: The Great Dinosaur Battle! Farewell Our Eternal Friends =

- Theatrical poster

Japanese name
- Kanji: 獣電戦隊キョウリュウジャーVSゴーバスターズ 恐竜大決戦! さらば永遠の友よ
Transcriptions
- Revised Hepburn: Jūden Sentai Kyōryūjā Tai Gōbasutāzu Kyōryū Daikessen! Saraba Eien no Tomo yo
- Directed by: Koichi Sakamoto
- Written by: Riku Sanjo
- Based on: Zyuden Sentai Kyoryuger by Riku Sanjo; Tokumei Sentai Go-Busters by Yasuko Kobayashi
- Starring: Ryo Ryusei; Syuusuke Saito; Yamato Kinjo; Akihisa Shiono; Ayuri Konno; Atsushi Maruyama; Katsuhiro Suzuki; Ryouma Baba; Arisa Komiya; Hiroya Matsumoto; Yūta Mochizuki; Koichiro Nishi
- Music by: Toshihiko Sahashi; Megumi Ohashi
- Production company: Toei Company
- Release date: January 18, 2014 (Japan)
- Running time: 63 min.
- Box office: US$3.8 million

Zyuden Sentai Kyoryuger vs. Go-Busters: The Great Dinosaur Battle! Farewell Our Eternal Friends (獣電戦隊キョウリュウジャーＶＳゴーバスターズ 恐竜大決戦! さらば永遠の友よ, Jūden Sentai Kyōryūjā Tai Gōbasutāzu Kyōryū Daikessen! Saraba Eien no Tomo yo) is a Japanese superhero film released on January 18, 2014. It is the annual "VS Series" movie, a crossover between the two latest Super Sentai series as of the film's release, Zyuden Sentai Kyoryuger and Tokumei Sentai Go-Busters. In addition, the cast of the upcoming series Ressha Sentai ToQger make cameo appearances in the film, as do cast members from prior series Kyōryū Sentai Zyuranger and Bakuryū Sentai Abaranger. Its plot & footage was used in Power Rangers Beast Morphers for the episodes Finders Keepers, Making Bad, and Grid Connection.

== Story ==
Alerted by Torin of an evil presence above the city, the Kyoryugers see a strange energy from the sky before a mysterious green-eyed Tyrannosaurus briefly appears with a warning that their friend could die. The Kyoryugers are then ambushed by a group of Zorima, Golem Soldiers, and Barmia Soldiers before an armored figure named Neo-Geilton arrives with a figure he has just kidnapped. Revealed to be Ryoga Hakua of the Bakuryū Sentai Abaranger team, he transforms and suddenly attacks the Kyoryugers. Luckily, the Go-Busters arrive and hold off AbaRed before Tyranno Ranger of the Kyōryū Sentai Zyuranger team turns the tide alongside his captor Neo-Grifforzar. After they and their teams retreat, Hiromu thanks Daigo for helping him and Gokai Red before they are ambushed by Enter. Enter explains that he and Escape have been resurrected as part of a Vaglass restoration program that has been activated in response to the evil force that Neo-Grifforzar and Neo-Geilton serve: Voldos, a being created from the combined malice of Dai Satan and Dezumozorlya that is targeting the dinosaur-themed Super Sentai teams to have their Dino Hope extracted and converted into Wicked Life Energy to complete his evolution.

With the Go-Busters and Beet J. Stag holding off the enemies, the Kyoryugers arrive at the site too late to save Ryouga and Geki in what is revealed to be a trap set for them, with Gabutyra defeated by Neo-Grifforzar and infused by Voldos's power. By the time the Go-Busters find them, the Kyoryugers have also been placed under Voldos's control as he sends them back in time to kill the dinosaurs. Upon encountering the dinosaurs, the Kyoryugers almost kill them when the green eyed Tyrannosaurus protecting them from an eruption breaks the spell as Daigo recognizes the dinosaur as Gabutyra in his original state. The Gabutyra of the past proceeds to explain to them the warning he told Daigo related to his future self who is dying from Voldos's influence and that only Daigo can save him with the power of Dino Hope. Elsewhere, with help from the Abarangers' Yukito Sanjo using a specially made Super Sentai Zyudenchi, Yayoi creates a time portal to bring the Kyoryugers back to the present time.

Meanwhile, the Go-Busters and Kyoryu Silver mount a rescue mission to save Ryouga and Geki when they are kept back by the Deboth Knights and Luckyuro while Neo-Grifforzar and Neo-Geilton take their captives with them. However, the Kyoryugers arrive and fight a losing battle against the grunts while Ryouga and Geki make a mutual attempt to fight Escape before Daigo finds the dying Gabutyra. Luckily, upon being joined by Jay alongside Masato due to the activation of one-time anti-virus program, the reunited Go-Busters team drives off the Deboth Army while destroying the satellite stations as Daigo succeeds in restoring Gabutyra to life. Joined by the assembled Zyuranger and Abaranger teams, using the Abaranger and Zyuranger Zyudenchi to give Gabutyra support in replicas of Guardian Beast Tyrannosaurus and Burstosaur Tyranno to deal with the villains' giant reinforcements, the Kyoryugers transform and the gathered Dinosaur Super Sentai take out the grunts. After the main team obliterates Enter in his Dark Buster form, Kyoryu Gold destroys Escape while the Abarangers defeat Neo-Geilton. Regrouping with the Zyurangers, the Dinosaur Super Sentai all combine the Kentrospiker, Howling Cannon, and Dino Bomber into the Ultimate Howling Cannon to destroy Neo-Grifforzar.

However, Neo-Grifforzar contains the blast as he departs to space to sacrifice himself so the amassed energy can complete Voldos's evolution. Though the Kyoryugers form Raiden Kyoryuzin, with the Guardian Beast Tyrannosaurus and Burstosaur Tyranno replicas transforming into Daizyuzin and AbarenOh, the Dinosaur Super Sentai are powerless against Voldos. Luckily, having obtained the Go-Busters Zyudenchi from Masato before he fades back into data, Red Buster summons Tategami LiOh whose head is used in the Tategami Raiden Kyoryuzin formation so it, Daizyuzin, and AbarenOh can focus their powers to blast Voldos back into space. Later, after giving their goodbyes to the Gabutyra of the past, the Kyoryugers decide to join the Go-Busters in a victory meal. However, Neo-Geilton has survived and uses Messiah Card 13 to become Neo-Messiah to avenge his creator before finding himself quickly destroyed by the unorthodox Ressha Sentai ToQger team.

== Cast ==
- Daigo Kiryu (桐生 ダイゴ, Kiryū Daigo): Ryo Ryusei (竜星 涼, Ryūsei Ryō)
- Ian Yorkland (イアン・ヨークランド, Ian Yōkurando): Syuusuke Saito (斉藤 秀翼, Saitō Shūsuke)
- Nobuharu Udo (有働 ノブハル, Udō Nobuharu): Yamato Kinjo (金城 大和, Kinjō Yamato)
- Souji Rippukan (立風館 ソウジ, Rippūkan Sōji): Akihisa Shiono (塩野 瑛久, Shiono Akihisa)
- Amy Yuuzuki (アミィ結月, Amyi Yūzuki): Ayuri Konno (今野 鮎莉, Konno Ayuri)
- Utsusemimaru (空蝉丸): Atsushi Maruyama (丸山 敦史, Maruyama Atsushi)
- Hiromu Sakurada (桜田 ヒロム, Sakurada Hiromu): Katsuhiro Suzuki (鈴木 勝大, Suzuki Katsuhiro)
- Ryuji Iwasaki (岩崎 リュウジ, Iwasaki Ryūji): Ryouma Baba (馬場 良馬, Baba Ryōma)
- Yoko Usami (宇佐見 ヨーコ, Usami Yōko): Arisa Komiya (小宮 有紗, Arisa Komiya)
- Masato Jin (陣 マサト, Jin Masato): Hiroya Matsumoto (松本 寛也, Matsumoto Hiroya)
- Geki (ゲキ): Yūta Mochizuki (望月 祐多, Mochizuki Yūta)
- Ryoga Hakua (伯亜 凌駕, Hakua Ryōga): Koichiro Nishi (西 興一朗, Nishi Kōichirō)
- Yukito Sanjo (三条 幸人, Sanjō Yukito): Sho Tomita (富田 翔, Tomita Shō)
- Yayoi Woorushade (弥生ウルシェード, Yayoi Urushēdo): Marie Iitoyo (飯豊 まりえ, Iitoyo Marie)
- Enter (エンター, Entā): Sho Jinnai (陳内 将, Jinnai Shō)
- Escape (エスケイプ, Esukeipu): Ayame Misaki (水崎 綾女, Misaki Ayame)
- Takeshi Kuroki (黒木 タケシ, Kuroki Takeshi): Hideo Sakaki (榊 英雄, Sakaki Hideo)
- Dantetsu Kiryu (桐生 ダンテツ, Kiryū Dantetsu): Shinji Yamashita (山下 真司, Yamashita Shinji)
- Wise God Torin (賢神トリン, Kenjin Torin; Voice): Toshiyuki Morikawa (森川 智之, Morikawa Toshiyuki)
- Beet J. Stag (ビート・J・スタッグ, Bīto Jei Sutaggu; Voice): Yuichi Nakamura (中村 悠一, Nakamura Yūichi)
- Cheeda Nick (チダ・ニック, Chida Nikku; Voice): Keiji Fujiwara (藤原 啓治, Fujiwara Keiji)
- Many-Faced High Priest Kaos (百面神官カオス, Hyakumen Shinkan Kaosu; Voice): Takayuki Sugō (菅生 隆之, Sugō Takayuki)
- Joyful Knight Canderrilla (喜びの戦騎キャンデリラ, Yorokobi no Senki Kyanderira; Voice): Haruka Tomatsu (戸松 遥, Tomatsu Haruka)
- Raging Knight Dogold (怒りの戦騎ドゴルド, Ikari no Senki Dogorudo; Voice): Satoshi Tsuruoka (鶴岡 聡, Tsuruoka Satoshi)
- Sorrowful Knight Aigallon (哀しみの戦騎アイガロン, Kanashimi no Senki Aigaron; Voice): Yū Mizushima (水島 裕, Mizushima Yū)
- Funfilled Spy Luckyulo (楽しみの密偵ラッキューロ, Tanoshimi no Mittei Rakkyūro; Voice): Ai Orikasa (折笠 愛, Orikasa Ai)
- Neo-Grifforzar (ネオグリフォーザー, Neo Gurifōzā; Voice): Hiroki Yasumoto (安元 洋貴, Yasumoto Hiroki)
- Neo-Geilton (ネオガイルトン, Neo Gairuton; Voice), Neo-Messiah (ネオメサイア, Neo Mesaia; Voice), Giant Space Dinosaur Voldos (宇宙大恐竜ボルドス, Uchū Dai Kyōryū Borudosu; Voice): Takuma Terashima (寺島 拓篤, Terashima Takuma)
- Tyrannosaurus (ティラノサウルス, Tiranosaurusu; Voice): Kōichi Yamadera (山寺 宏一, Yamadera Kōichi)
- Mammoth Ranger (マンモスレンジャー, Manmosu Renjā; Voice): Seiju Umon (右門 青寿, Umon Seiju)
- Tricera Ranger (トリケラレンジャー, Torikera Renjā; Voice): Hideki Fujiwara (藤原 秀樹, Fujiwara Hideki; Uncredited)
- Tiger Ranger (タイガーレンジャー, Taigā Renjā; Voice): Takumi Hashimoto (橋本 巧, Hashimoto Takumi)
- Ptera Ranger (プテラレンジャー, Putera Renjā; Voice): Reiko Chiba (千葉 麗子, Chiba Reiko)
- Abare Yellow (アバレイエロー, Abare Ierō; Voice): Aiko Itō (いとう あいこ, Itō Aiko; Uncredited)
- ToQ 1gou (トッキュウ1号, Tokkyū Ichi-gō; Voice): Jun Shison (志尊 淳, Shison Jun)
- ToQ 2gou (トッキュウ2号, Tokkyū Ni-gō; Voice): Jin Hiramaki (平牧 仁, Hiramaki Jin)
- ToQ 3gou (トッキュウ3号, Tokkyū San-gō; Voice): Riria Kojima (梨里杏)
- ToQ 4gou (トッキュウ4号, Tokkyū Yon-gō; Voice): Ryusei Yokohama (横浜 流星, Yokohama Ryūsei)
- ToQ 5gou (トッキュウ5号, Tokkyū Go-gō; Voice): Ai Moritaka (森高 愛, Moritaka Ai)
- Kyoryuger Equipment Voice: Shigeru Chiba (千葉 繁, Chiba Shigeru)
- ToQger Equipment Voice: Kappei Yamaguchi (山口 勝平, Yamaguchi Kappei)

== Theme song ==
- "Minna de Carnival" (みんな・デ・カーニバル, Minna De Kānibaru; "Everybody Carnival")
  - Lyrics: Shoko Fujibayashi, Saburo Yatsude
  - Composition & Arrangement: Go Sakabe
  - Artist: Hideaki Takatori, Showgo Kamada

== Reception ==
By February 2, 2014, the film had grossed ¥321,358,736 (US$3,140,960) at the Japanese box office.
