= Ultraman Arc =

Japanese television series

- Genre: Tokusatsu; Kaiju; Kyodai Hero; Science fiction; Drama
- Created by: Tsuburaya Productions
- Screenplay by: Junichiro Ashiki; Toshizo Nemoto; Kyoko Katsuya; Ryo Yoshigami; Masaya Honda; Takao Nakano; Uiko Miura
- Story by: Jun Tsugita
- Directed by: Takanori Tsujimoto (Note: Series director. Episodes directors are Masayoshi Takesue, Tomonobu Koshi, Hiroaki Yuasa, Naoyuki Uchida, Takafumi Suzuki, and Yusuke Akitake.)
- Starring: Yuki Totsuka; Sho Kaneta; Kaho Mizutani; Koichiro Nishi
- Voices of: Yūya Hirose
- Opening theme: "arc jump'n to the sky"; by Access
- Ending theme: "Mera Mera"; by Arcana Project; "Michikake"; by Arcana Project
- Composer: Yuki Hayashi
- Country of origin: Japan
- Original language: Japanese
- No. of episodes: 25

Production
- Executive producer: Masahiro Onda
- Producers: Yusuke Okamoto; Junko Oishi; Wataru Tanaka
- Cinematography: Satoshi Murakawa
- Editors: Yosuke Yafune; Motoki Kashiwakura; Godai Inaba
- Running time: 25 minutes
- Production companies: Tsuburaya Productions; TV Tokyo; Dentsu

Original release
- Network: TXN (TV Tokyo)
- Release: July 6, 2024 – January 18, 2025

Related
- Ultraman Blazar; Ultraman Omega

Ultraman Arc (ウルトラマンアーク, Urutoraman Āku) is a Japanese drama series produced by Tsuburaya Productions. It is the 29th entry (39th overall) in the Ultra Series, released to both commemorate the 15th anniversary of Ultraman Zero and the 10th anniversary of the New Generation Heroes series. The series began airing on all TXN-affiliated networks in Japan on July 6, 2024.

== Synopsis ==
16 years ago, kaiju attacks occurred all across the globe and were suppressed by the Global Defense Force or GDF. This incident, dubbed as "K-Day" changed the world forever. At Hoshimoto City, a giant horn-like object is stuck on the ground as a reminder to that incident known as the "Monohorn", the horn of the galactic beast Monogelos as the GDF kept on dealing with kaiju attacks on a daily basis. To prevent disasters caused by these attacks, the GDF opened a special organization named SKIP or Scientific Kaiju Investigation and Prevention center to works closely with the community in scientific investigations and evacuation guidance to prevent the occurrence and aggravation of kaiju disasters. SKIP has also been investigating the Monohorn which appeared on K-Day.

Yuma Hize is one of the people who survived an attack with Monogelos but his parents died during the attack. After that experience, he pursue a career on kaiju biology research, and despite his traumatic past, he has not lost his "imagination" to dream. As a rookie investigator, Yuma joined SKIP and was assigned to the Hoshimoto City Branch. But when a new kaiju attacked the city and Yuma desperate to help the people in need, Rution, the being of light that he once saw as a child came to his aid and told him to unleash his imagination. With both of their powers, Yuma transforms into a new giant of light: Ultraman Arc in to protect everyone from kaiju attacks threatening the city.

== Episodes ==
No.	Title	Directed by	Written by	Original release date
SP	"Ultraman Arc Preview Special"; Transliteration: "Urutoraman Āku Chokuzen Supesharu" (Japanese: ウルトラマンアーク直前スペシャル)	N/A	N/A	June 29, 2024
1	"Arc to the Future"; Transliteration: "Mirai e Kakeru Āku" (Japanese: 未来へ駆ける円弧(アーク))	Takanori Tsujimoto	Jun Tsugita	July 6, 2024
2	"Legend in the Woods"; Transliteration: "Densetsu wa Mori no Naka ni" (Japanese: 伝説は森の中に)	Takanori Tsujimoto	Jun Tsugita	July 13, 2024
3	"Unleash Your Imagination!"; Transliteration: "Sōzōryoku o Tokihanate!" (Japanese: 想像力を解き放て！)	Takanori Tsujimoto	Jun Tsugita	July 20, 2024
4	"On the Kaiju's Tail"; Transliteration: "Tadaima Kaijū Tsuisekichū" (Japanese: ただいま怪獣追跡チュウ)	Masayoshi Takesue	Junichiro Ashiki	July 27, 2024
5	"Ocean on the Mountain Ridge"; Transliteration: "Tōge no Umi" (Japanese: 峠の海)	Masayoshi Takesue	Toshizo Nemoto	August 3, 2024
6	"Welcome to the Akebono Inn"; Transliteration: "Akebono-sō e Yōkoso" (Japanese: あけぼの荘へようこそ)	Masayoshi Takesue	Jun Tsugita	August 10, 2024
SP	"At SKIP Fujiyama City Branch"; Transliteration: "Sukippu Fujiyama-shi Bunsho nite" (Japanese: SKIPフジヤマ市分所にて)	N/A	N/A	August 17, 2024
7	"The Full Moon's Answer"; Transliteration: "Mangetsu no Kotae" (Japanese: 満月の応え)	Tomonobu Koshi	Kyoko Katsuya	August 24, 2024
8	"Internet Kanegon"; Transliteration: "Intānetto Kanegon" (Japanese: インターネット・カネゴン)	Tomonobu Koshi	Ryo Yoshigami	August 31, 2024
9	"Goodbye, Rin"; Transliteration: "Sayonara, Rin" (Japanese: さよなら、リン)	Hiroaki Yuasa	Toshizo Nemoto	September 7, 2024
10	"To My Distant Friend"; Transliteration: "Tōku no Kimi e" (Japanese: 遠くの君へ)	Hiroaki Yuasa	Junichiro Ashiki	September 14, 2024
11	"Message"; Transliteration: "Messēji" (Japanese: メッセージ)	Masayoshi Takesue	Masaya Honda	September 21, 2024
12	"You Are Givas"; Transliteration: "Omae wa Givasu" (Japanese: お前はギヴァス)	Masayoshi Takesue	Masaya Honda	September 28, 2024
13	"Shu's Report"; Transliteration: "Shū no Repōto" (Japanese: シュウのレポート)	Takafumi Suzuki	Junichiro Ashiki	October 5, 2024
14	"Flash of the Past"; Transliteration: "Kako no Matataki" (Japanese: 過去の瞬き)	Takanori Tsujimoto	Jun Tsugita	October 12, 2024
15	"The Wandering Future"; Transliteration: "Samayoeru Mirai" (Japanese: さまよえる未来)	Takanori Tsujimoto	Jun Tsugita	October 19, 2024
SP	"At SKIP Miyako City Branch"; Transliteration: "Sukippu Miyako-shi Bunsho nite" (Japanese: SKIPミヤコ市分所にて)	N/A	N/A	October 26, 2024
16	"The Light of Fear"; Transliteration: "Osore no Hikari" (Japanese: 恐れの光)	Tomonobu Koshi	Toshizo Nemoto	November 2, 2024
17	"Demon Slicing Meteor Sword"; Transliteration: "Zanki Ryūsei-ken" (Japanese: 斬鬼流星剣)	Tomonobu Koshi	Takao Nakano	November 9, 2024
18	"Arc Cooperation Request"; Transliteration: "Āku Kyōryoku Yōsei" (Japanese: アーク協力要請)	Masayoshi Takesue	Junichiro Ashiki	November 16, 2024
19	"The Transcending Wish"; Transliteration: "Koeru Omoi" (Japanese: 超える想い)	Masayoshi Takesue	Toshizo Nemoto	November 23, 2024
20	"What Is Passed Down"; Transliteration: "Uketsugareru Mono" (Japanese: 受け継がれるもの)	Yusuke Akitake	Uiko Miura	November 30, 2024
21	"The Dream Bird"; Transliteration: "Yumesaki-dori" (Japanese: 夢咲き鳥)	Yusuke Akitake	Takao Nakano	December 7, 2024
22	"The Man in the White Mask"; Transliteration: "Shiroi Kamen no Otoko" (Japanese: 白い仮面の男)	Tomonobu Koshi	Masaya Honda	December 14, 2024
23	"Calamity Thrice"; Transliteration: "Yakusai Mitabi" (Japanese: 厄災三たび)	Tomonobu Koshi	Junichiro Ashiki	December 21, 2024
SP	"To Everyone at SKIP Hoshimoto City Branch"; Transliteration: "Sukippu Hoshimoto-shi Bunsho no Minasama e" (Japanese: SKIP星元市分所のみなさまへ)	N/A	N/A	January 4, 2025
24	"The Descending Dream"; Transliteration: "Maioriru Mugen" (Japanese: 舞い降りる夢幻)	Takanori Tsujimoto	Jun Tsugita	January 11, 2025
25	"Time to Run, Yuma!"; Transliteration: "Hashire, Yūma!" (Japanese: 走れ、ユウマ！)	Takanori Tsujimoto	Jun Tsugita	January 18, 2025

== Film ==
Ultraman Arc The Movie: The Clash of Light and Evil (ウルトラマンアーク THE MOVIE 超次元大決戦！光と闇のアーク, Urutoraman Āku za Mūbī Chō Jigen Dai Kessen! Hikari to Yami no Āku) is a film released in Japanese theaters on February 21, 2025.

== Production ==
Produced by Tsuburaya Productions, Ultraman Arc was first trademarked and registered by the company on December 13, 2023, and published on December 21, 2023. The series was fully revealed on April 5, 2024, alongside a short initial trailer. Tsuburaya Productions stated the theme of the series to revolve around "Dreams", and aims to be an inspiration to children about "the power to dream" and a bridge towards a bright, hopeful future. Yuki Totsuka is announced to play as the lead character Yuma Hize while director Takanori Tsujimoto will be directing the series following his last directorial role in Ultraman X. Koichiro Nishi also joins in as part of the crew for the series, having worked on in previous works such as Bakuryū Sentai Abaranger, Kamen Rider W, & Space Sheriff Sharivan: The Next Generation.

== Broadcast ==
Ultraman Arc began airing in all TXN affiliated networks in Japan on July 6, 2024, following a special preview episode on June 29, 2024. Alongside its local airing in Japan, Tsuburaya announced the series will air in other countries in both local channels and online streaming in Japan and Asia via its official YouTube Channel and Tsuburaya Imagination VoD service and Tsuburaya Connection in western territories. Asian online and TV simulcast broadcasts of the series in China, Hong Kong, Taiwan, Thailand, Indonesia and Vietnam were also announced in their respective dates.

== Cast ==
Character	Japanese cast	English voice cast
Yuma Hize (飛世 ユウマ, Hize Yūma)	Yuki Totsuka (戸塚 有輝, Totsuka Yūki)	Paul Castro Jr.
Shu Ishido (石堂 シュウ, Ishidō Shū)	Sho Kaneta (金田 昇, Kaneta Shō)	Micah Solusod
Rin Natsume (夏目 リン, Natsume Rin)	Kaho Mizutani (水谷 果穂, Mizutani Kaho)	Dani Chambers
Hiroshi Ban (伴 ヒロシ, Ban Hiroshi)	Koichiro Nishi (西 興一朗, Nishi Kōichirō)	Tony Oliver
Sweed (スイード, Suīdo)	Eriko Sato (佐藤 江梨子, Satō Eriko)	Sam Slade
YouPi (ユピー, Yupī; Voice)	Yūya Hirose (広瀬 裕也, Hirose Yūya)	Brandon McInnis
Ultraman Arc (Voice)	Masato Hagiwara (萩原 聖人, Hagiwara Masato)	Christopher Wehkamp

- Narrator (SP1–4): Mitsutaka Itakura (板倉 光隆, Itakura Mitsutaka)

=== Guest cast ===
- Masumi Hize (飛世 マスミ, Hize Masumi; 3): Toshie Negishi (根岸 季衣, Negishi Toshie)
- Shinya Makino (牧野 信也, Makino Shin'ya; 5): Koichi Miura (三浦 浩一, Miura Kōichi)
- Numata (ヌマタ; 6, 12): Akira 100% (アキラ100%, Akira Hyaku-pāsento)
- Kazuo Kizaki (木崎 カズオ, Kizaki Kazuo; 10): Yu Sakuma (佐久間 悠, Sakuma Yū)
- Zangill (ザンギル, Zangiru; Voice; 16–17): Mitsuru Karahashi (唐橋 充, Mitsuru Karahashi)

== Theme songs ==
Opening theme

- "arc jump'n to the sky"
  - Lyrics: Hiroyuki Takami (貴水 博之, Takami Hiroyuki)
  - Composition & Arrangement: Daisuke Asakura (浅倉 大介, Asakura Daisuke)
  - Artist: Access
  - Episodes: 1-13 (Verse 1), 14-24 (Verse 2)
  In the final episode, this song is used as an ending theme.

Ending themes

- "Mera Mera" (メラメラ; "Blazing" or "Sizzling")
  - Lyrics, Composition, & Arrangement: Saeki youthK (佐伯youthK, Saeki Yūsuke)
  - Artist: Arcana Project
  - Episodes: 1–13
- "Michikake" (ミチカケ; "Waxing and Waning")
  - Lyrics, Composition, & Arrangement: Saeki youthK
  - Artist: Arcana Project
  - Episodes: 14–24

== See also ==
- Ultra Series – Complete list of official Ultraman-related shows.
