= Sho Tomita =

Japanese actor

- 富田 翔
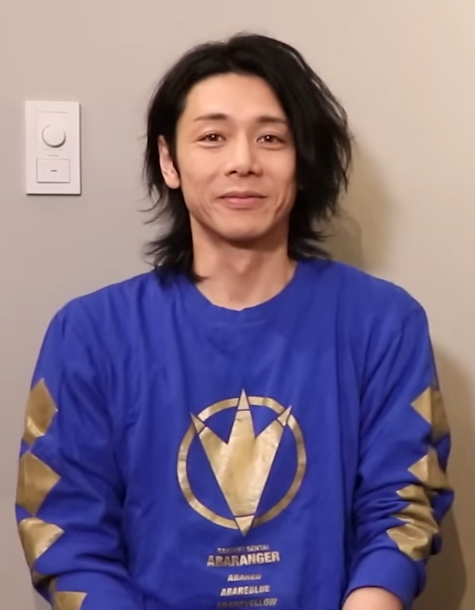
- Tomita in 2023
- Born: January 7, 1982 (age 44); Tokyo, Japan
- Occupation: Actor
- Years active: 2002-present
- Height: 171 cm (5 ft 7 in)

Sho Tomita (富田 翔, Tomita Shō; born January 7, 1982 in Tokyo) is a Japanese actor who is affiliated with Toki Entertainment. He played the role of Yukito Sanjyo (Abare Blue) in the 2003 Super Sentai TV series Bakuryū Sentai Abaranger.

== Biography ==
In 2002, Tomita debuted in the television drama Gokusen.

In 2003, he appeared in Bakuryū Sentai Abaranger as Yukito Sanjyo/Abare Blue.

In 2005, Tomita was scheduled to appear in the television drama Kyōtochiken'noon'na 2 dai 2 Series, but he was knocked due to illness.

He left Production Oki, and later started an official Ameba blog from June 2008. In July of the same year, Tomita was later scheduled for the stage play Double Booking!.

In 2011, he played Yukito Sanjyo in the 29th episode of Kaizoku Sentai Gokaiger he appeared with Michi Nishijima for the first time for eight years.

In January 2014, Tomita appeared in the film Zyuden Sentai Kyoryuger vs. Go-Busters: The Great Dinosaur Battle! Farewell Our Eternal Friends as Yukito Sanjyo/Abare Blue with Koichiro Nishi for the first time in nine years.

== Filmography ==
=== TV series ===
Year	Title	Role	Network	Other notes
2003–2004	Bakuryū Sentai Abaranger	Yukito Sanjyo/Abare Blue	TV Asahi	
2005	Haruka Seventeen	Hitoshi Hashimoto	TV Asahi	Episode 3
2006	Sengoku Jieitai: Sekigahara no Tatakai	Toru Shimizu	NTV	
2007	Mito Kōmon	Kazuyoshi	TBS	Episode 7
2011	Kaizoku Sentai Gokaiger	Yukito Sanjyo	TV Asahi	Episode 29

=== Films ===
Year	Title	Role	Other notes
2002	Ping Pong		
2014	Zyuden Sentai Kyoryuger vs. Go-Busters: The Great Dinosaur Battle! Farewell Our Eternal Friends	Yukito Sanjyo/Abare Blue	
2014	No Touching At All	Ryo Onoda	
