= Aiko Itō =

- いとう あいこ
- Born: 伊藤 愛子; October 24, 1980 (age 45); Yokohama, Kanagawa Prefecture, Japan
- Occupation: Actress
- Years active: 1999–2010

Aiko Itō (いとう あいこ, Itō Aiko; born October 24, 1980, in Yokohama, Kanagawa Prefecture) is a former Japanese actress who was affiliated with Stardust Promotion. She is best known for playing the role of Ranru Itsuki / Abare Yellow in the 2003 Super Sentai TV series Bakuryū Sentai Abaranger.

== Biography ==
In 1999, Itō debuted in a commercial for Otsuka Pharmaceutical. In 2000, her first appearance as a cut model in the September issue of the magazine CanCam. In 2002, Itō, with models such as Mika Hijii, appeared on the visual unit Chao. The same year, they became the idle unit D★shues released a CD. In 2003, she appeared in Bakuryū Sentai Abaranger as Ranru Itsuki/Abare Yellow. In 2005, Itō played a role of a student for three months topic English Hāto de kanjiru eibunhō (NHK Educational TV), the next year she appeared in colleague in the Conversation Edition. In 2006, her first main role in a film was Love saiko-kyōwaku no horā "Saikō no kareshi". The same year, Itō played the leading role as Shiori Sano in the TBS Ai no gekijō, Suites Dream. In 2007, she was earnest to advance stage from, she appeared in the center of the blockbuster. In 2008, Itō played the leading role as Tamaki Nanase in Fuji TV daytime drama series Aishū no Romera. In 2009, she appeared in Fuji TV's Hontoniattakowaihanashi. In March 17, 2010, Itō married to a construction company executive which was announced on February 10. In November 2010, she left the Stardust Promotion agency and retired from acting the following December. In 2012, Itō was appointed to the narrator of Iwakuni Museum in Iwakuni, Yamaguchi Prefecture.

In 2023, during promotion for Bakuryū Sentai Abaranger 20th: The Unforgivable Fury, it was revealed that she had previously reprised her role of Ranru Itsuki/Abare Yellow in an uncredited voice role for Kyoryuger vs Go-Busters and unable to reprise her role physically as she was busy raising her child at the time.

== Filmography ==
=== Television ===
Year	Title	Role	Notes
2001	Kamen Rider Agito	Customer	Episode: "That Awakening"
2003–2004	Bakuryū Sentai Abaranger	Ranru Itsuki / Abare Yellow	Main role; 50 episodes
2007	Ultraman Mebius	Aya Jinguji	2 episodes
2008	Aishū no Romera	Nanase Tamaki	Main role

=== Film ===
Year	Title	Role	Notes
2003	Bakuryū Sentai Abaranger DELUXE: Abare Summer is Freezing Cold!	Ranru Itsuki / Abare Yellow	Main role
2006	Ultraman Mebius & Ultraman Brothers	Aya Jinguji	
2008	Happy Flight	Rie Miyamoto	
2014	Zyuden Sentai Kyoryuger vs. Go-Busters: The Great Dinosaur Battle! Farewell Our Eternal Friends	Ranru Itsuki / Abare Yellow	Uncredited / Voice-only
2023	Bakuryuu Sentai Abaranger 20th: The Unforgivable Abare!	Ranru Itsuki / Abare Yellow	Main role
