= Kaidan Shin Mimibukuro: Yūrei Mansion =

- Theatrical poster
- Directed by: Akio Yoshida
- Written by: Mutsuki Watanabe
- Based on: Kaidan Shin Mimibukuro by Hirokatsu Kihara
- Produced by: Andrew Tamon Niwa; Yukihiko Yamaguchi
- Starring: Mei Kurokawa; Yoshihiko Hosoda; Yūta Sone; Ayaka Maeda; Mitsuru Fukikoshi
- Cinematography: Kōji Endō
- Edited by: Tamae Ōtsuka
- Music by: Masahiko Ōmi
- Production companies: Tokyo Broadcasting System; BS-i
- Distributed by: Slow Learner
- Release date: August 15, 2005
- Running time: 93 minutes
- Country: Japan
- Language: Japanese

Kaidan Shin Mimibukuro: Yūrei Mansion (怪談新耳袋劇場版 幽霊マンション; Tales of Terror: The Haunted Apartment) is a 2005 Japanese horror film of the Tales of Terror from Tokyo and All Over Japan television and film series.

== Overview ==
It is a horror drama in the form of short films, each five minutes long, and has been broadcast intermittently since its first broadcast in February 2003. Top creators such as Shimizu Takashi and Amemiya Keita have also participated as directors.

It was made into an anthology film in August 2004, and the second film in August 2005 was the first feature-length film in the series.

This work was broadcast in 23 countries around the world, and the film version was distributed worldwide, becoming a long-selling hit.

The original work is a collection of true ghost stories, Shin Mimibukuro (Hirokatsu Kihara, Ichiro Nakayama, Media Factory). However, since each film has its own unique interpretation and adaptation, there are many stories that have a different horror and flavor from the original.

The TV series was originally a video software called "Shin Mimibukuro: Kihara Hirokatsu's Beautiful Women Ghost Stories" (2002), in which the original author Kihara tells ghost stories to the actress Miwa Hitomi, and was made into a TV drama with the cooperation of Suzuki Kosuke, the director of "Beautiful Women Ghost Stories".

The subtitles for each series below (night XX, episode XX) are the subtitles when released on DVD, and are not written on the screen when they are originally broadcast. The English titles are the subtitles on the DVDs released in the US.

Episodes 81, 82, 83, and 84, which are not included in the TV series DVDs Night 1, Night 2, The White String Episode, Don't Open It Episode, Getting Closer Episode, The Bride Episode, The Exorcism Doesn't Work Episode, The Three Are Coming Episode, Just the Two of Us Episode, Final Night 1, and Final Night 2, are called "The Night Watchman's Report 1", "The Night Watchman's Report 2", "The Night Watchman's Report 3", and "The Night Watchman's Report 4", respectively. The goal was to produce 99 episodes from the first series, and this was achieved in the fifth series.

The same characters (with the same names, settings, and actors) often appear in different episodes. Some unfortunate people have experienced strange phenomena more than 10 times.

When rebroadcast on terrestrial and BS TV, it is often aired as a 30-minute program in a different combination than the one below.

== Plot ==
Aimi, a teenage girl and her alcoholic father move into an old, apartment building. Her mother died two years ago in an accident, and her father hasn't been able to recover from the incident. Things soon become worse as the two learn that the apartment is haunted. The landlord warns Aimi and her father of the rules. The first rule being that no one can move out until a new tenant arrives. The second rule is whenever a resident leaves and returns to the building, they must cross the rope in front of the property by midnight, or if they fail to return during the given curfew, then they will suffer a horrible death by a mysterious force. Aimi soon begins to see visions of a girl who doesn't exist. She learns that the girl is named Ai, and lived in the apartment 30 years ago, but mysteriously vanished one day on her way home from school. Aimi finds out the secret of being sexually abused by their fathers that the two girls share. Ai kills Aimi's father. The curse was now lifted, residents who lived there left the apartment, but Aimi stayed with Ai.

== Cast ==
- Mei Kurokawa as Aimi Yamato
- Yoshihiko Hosoda as Takashi Izumo
- Yūta Sone as Sho
- Ayaka Maeda as Ai Takamatsu
- Mitsuru Fukikoshi as Mr. Yamato, Aimi's father

== Home media ==
A DVD version was released in Japan in December 2005.
