= Bakuryū Sentai Abaranger =

Japanese television series

- The title card
- Genre: Tokusatsu; Superhero fiction Comedy
- Created by: Toei Company
- Developed by: Naruhisa Arakawa
- Directed by: Hajime Konaka
- Starring: Koichiro Nishi; Sho Tomita; Aiko Itō; Kaoru Abe; Koutaro Tanaka; Michi Nishijima; Kouen Okumura; Maya Banno; Eri Sakurai; Kasumi Suzuki
- Voices of: Takashi Nagasako; Kōki Miyata; Emi Shinohara; Banjō Ginga; Hikaru Midorikawa
- Music by: Kentarō Haneda; Megumi Ōhashi; Hiroshi Takaki; Kenji Yamamoto; Kousuke Yamashita
- Opening theme: "Bakuryū Sentai Abaranger" performed by Masaaki Endoh
- Ending theme: "We are the ONE ~Bokura wa Hitotsu~" performed by Akira Kushida
- Country of origin: Japan
- Original language: Japanese
- No. of episodes: 50 (list of episodes)

Production
- Producers: Chika Hamada (TV Asahi); Jun Hikasa (TV Asahi); Go Nakajima (Toei); Hideaki Tsukada (Toei); Kōichi Yada (Toei Agency)
- Production location: Tokyo, Japan (Greater Tokyo Area)
- Running time: 25 minutes
- Production companies: TV Asahi; Toei Company; Toei Agency

Original release
- Network: ANN (TV Asahi)
- Release: February 16, 2003 – February 8, 2004

Related
- Ninpuu Sentai Hurricaneger; Tokusou Sentai Dekaranger

Bakuryū Sentai Abaranger (爆竜戦隊アバレンジャー, Bakuryū Sentai Abarenjā; Burstosaur Squadron Abaranger) (Note: Bakuryū (爆竜) when literally translated means "Burst Dragon", but is actually a portmanteau of the Japanese words baku (爆, "burst" or "blast" as in an explosion) and kyōryū (恐竜, "dinosaur"). In English, this roughly translates into "Burstosaur".) (Note: The name "Abaranger" is a portmanteau of Abare (in the show, an acronym that stands for Attack Bandit Resistance; in Japanese, the term abare (暴れ) also means "riot", "rage", or "outburst" among other translations) and Ranger, so the romanization can be either Abaranger or Abarenger.) is a Japanese Tokusatsu television show and Toei's 27th production of the Super Sentai metaseries. After Toei filed a trademark for the series on October 17, 2002, it aired from February 16, 2003, to February 8, 2004, replacing Ninpuu Sentai Hurricaneger, and was replaced by Tokusou Sentai Dekaranger. The program was part of TV Asahi's 2003 Super Hero Time block with Kamen Rider 555. The series is based on dinosaurs and explosions. Its action footage, and episode 10 in its entirety, was used in Power Rangers Dino Thunder.

The cast members from the series reprised their roles for the 2014 film Zyuden Sentai Kyoryuger vs. Go-Busters: The Great Dinosaur Battle! Farewell Our Eternal Friends.

Shout! Factory released the series on Region 1 DVD on 8 November 2022.

== Plot ==
Scientists believe that 65,000,000 years ago, a meteorite's crash on Earth killed off the dinosaurs. In truth, it split Earth into two parallel universes. Dino Earth is an Earth where dinosaurs are still the superior species. Our Earth is referred to as Another Earth by the residents of Dino Earth. Over time, the Saurian and Bakuryū races came into being on Dino Earth. They were at war with the Evoliens, entities that emerged from the meteor. The two Earths are separate until Asuka, one of the Saurians from Dino Earth, arrives on Another Earth via a trans-dimensional portal. However, he is followed by the Evoliens in their Anomalocaris spaceship along with three Bakuryū under their control. As the Bakuryū attack Tokyo, a call is sent out to three destined ones who possess Dino Guts to gain the power to tame these beasts. Together with their Bakuryū partners, the three become Abarangers to protect their dimension from the Evoliens. In time, another Abaranger appears, takes the name Abare Killer, and fights the others while the Evoliens carry out their ultimate goal: the resurrection of their god.

== Characters ==
=== Abarangers ===
The eponymous Abarangers are individuals chosen by the sentient dinosaur-themed Bakuryū (爆竜; Burstosaur) mecha for their unique Dino Guts (ダイノガッツ, Daino Gattsu) energy, which allows them to activate Abare Mode (アバレモード, Abare Mōdo) where they extend spikes from their Abare Suits (アバレスーツ, Abare Sūtsu), or 0gou Suit (0号スーツ, Zero-gō Sūtsu) in the case of Abare Killer, to gain animalistic fighting instincts.

Each primary member carries a Dino Brace (ダイノブレス, Daino Buresu) as their transformation device along with an Aba Laser (アバレイザー, Aba Reizā), which can switch between Gun Mode (ガンモード, Gan Mōdo) and Sword Mode (ソードモード, Sōdo Mōdo), as their sidearm. By combining their personal weapons, they form the Dino Bomber (ダイノボンバー, Daino Bonbā), which can further combine with up to two of the secondary Abarangers' sidearms to form the Super Dino Bomber (スーパーダイノボンバー, Sūpā Daino Bonbā) and/or Superior Dino Bomber (スーペリアダイノボンバー, Sūperia Daino Bonbā), to destroy human-sized Trinoids. With the exception of Mikoto, the entire team rides Velociraptor-themed Ride Raptor (ライドラプター, Raido Raputā) creatures for transportation.

In Bakuryū Sentai Abaranger vs. Hurricaneger, the Abarangers combine their Super Dino Bomber and the Hurricanegers and Gouraigers' Victory Gadget to form the Super Dino Victory (スーパーダイノビクトリー, Sūpā Daino Bikutorī). In Zyuden Sentai Kyoryuger vs. Go-Busters: The Great Dinosaur Battle! Farewell Our Eternal Friends, the Abarangers combine their Dino Bomber, the Zyurangers' Howling Cannon, and the Kyoryugers' Kentrospiker to form the Ultimate Howling Cannon (アルティメットハウリングキャノン, Arutimetto Hauringu Kyanon).

- Ryoga Hakua (伯亜 凌駕, Hakua Ryōga): A 22-year-old environmental protection investigator from the United States who is the brash, good-natured, and warm-hearted leader of the Abarangers. He is also his niece Mai's guardian after the deaths of his brother and sister-in-law, and does his best to raise her. Ryoga becomes AbaRed (アバレッド, Abareddo) and is partnered with Bakuryū Tyrannosaurus (爆竜ティラノサウルス, Bakuryū Tiranosaurusu), nicknamed "Tyranno" (ティラノ, Tirano). In battle, he wields the Tyranno Rod (ティラノロッド, Tirano Roddo) staff. Later in the series, Ryoga acquires the StyRiser (スティライザー, Sutiraizā) shield/sword hybrid, which allows him to transform into his power-up form; Abare Max (アバレマックス, Abare Makkusu) He also gains a secondary partner in Bakuryū Styracosaurus (爆竜スティラコサウルス, Bakuryū Sutirakosaurusu), nicknamed "Styraco" (スティラコ, Sutirako). He tours the United States with Mai after the Evoliens are defeated. In Kyoryuger vs. Go-Busters, Ryoga is kidnapped by Neo-Geilton so his Dino Hope can be extracted for Voldos, but is saved by the Kyoryugers. He and his team then join forces with the Zyurangers, Go-Busters, and Kyoryugers in order to defeat their common enemy. In Bakuryū Sentai Abaranger 20th: The Unforgivable Fury, Ryoga uses his teammates' Dino Guts to evolve his Abare Max form into Super Abare Max (超ちょうアバレマックス, Chō Abare Makkusu).
- Yukito Sanjo (三条 幸人, Sanjō Yukito): A 21-year-old chiropractor who initially became Abare Blue (アバレブルー, Abare Burū) for the money and is partnered with Bakuryū Triceratops (爆竜トリケラトプス, Bakuryū Torikeratopusu), nicknamed "Tricera" (トリケラ, Torikera). In battle, he wields the Tricera Bunker (トリケラバンカー, Torikera Bankā) shield. Despite his cool exterior as the result of a falling out with his father trying to prep him as the next head of their family's company, Yukito has a kind heart. He resumes his chiropractic career after the Evoliens are defeated, making appearances in Tokusou Sentai Dekaranger vs. Abaranger where he helps fix Doggie Kruger's back problem, Kaizoku Sentai Gokaiger where he married Emiri while helping the Gokaigers master his team's Great Power, and Kyoryuger vs. Go-Busters where he infuses his Dino Guts into the Abaranger Zyudenchi developed by Yayoi Woorushade.
- Ranru Itsuki (樹 らんる, Itsuki Ranru): A 20-year-old tech-whiz with an interest in anything mechanical who becomes Abare Yellow (アバレイエロー, Abare Ierō) and is partnered with Bakuryū Pteranodon (爆竜プテラノドン, Bakuryū Puteranodon), nicknamed "Ptera" (プテラ, Putera). In battle, she dual wields the twin Ptera Daggers (プテラダガー, Putera Dagā). Her Abare Mode also grants a pair of pterosaur wings. She finds work on a racetrack after the Evoliens are defeated.
- Asuka (アスカ): A Saurian (竜人, Ryūjin) warrior from Dino Earth (ダイノアース, Daino Āsu) who battled the Evoliens as Abare Black (アバレブラック, Abare Burakku), utilizing the harmonica-like Dino Harp (ダイノハープ, Daino Hāpu) key in conjunction with the Dino Commander (ダイノコマンダー, Daino Komandā) bracelet to transform, with his partner Bakuryū Brachiosaurus (爆竜ブラキオサウルス, Bakuryū Burakiosaurusu), nicknamed "Brachio" (ブラキオ, Burakio)). In battle, he wields the Dino Thruster (ダイノスラスター, Daino Surasutā) rapier, which allows him to perform varying elemental Inferno (インフェルノ, Inferuno) attacks. However, his Dino Harp is damaged while escaping to Another Earth (アナザーアース, Anazā Āsu) with the Dino Braces, providing them to the primary Abarangers while assuming the identity of Asuka Ono (大野 飛鳥, Ōno Asuka). He eventually joins the Abarangers once he restores his Dino Harp, later manifesting his Dino Guts and learning that his wife Mahoro was brainwashed by the Evoliens with their unborn child becoming Lije. After regaining his family, renaming his daughter in honor of Mikoto, Asuka returns to Dino Earth with the Bakuryū. He makes return appearances in Dekaranger vs. Abaranger and GoGo Sentai Boukenger vs. Super Sentai.
- Mikoto Nakadai (仲代 壬琴, Nakadai Mikoto): A disillusioned doctor who found joy in witnessing the first Evolien attack before the primary Abarangers ruined his fun, coming across a prototype of the Dino Brace called the Dino Minder (ダイノマインダー, Daino Maindā) and the egg of Bakuryū Topgaler (爆竜トップゲイラー, Bakuryū Toppugeirā), nicknamed "Top" (トップ, Toppu). Mikoto utilizes the Dino Minder to become the white-colored Abare Killer (アバレキラー, Abare Kirā) as he targets the Abrangers. In battle, he wields the Wing Pentact (ウイングペンタクト, Uingu Pentakuto) sidearm, which can switch between its quill-like Tact Mode (タクトモード, Takuto Mōdo) and its sword-like Blade Mode (ブレードモード, Burēdo Mōdo), and possesses superhuman speed. His Abare Mode also equips him with the twin wrist-mounted Killer Claw (キラークロー, Kirā Kurō) blades. Even after learning that his 0gou Suit is a flawed prototype with a self-destruct mechanism, Mikoto saw it as incentive to continue fighting as he revives Topgaler and drafts Bakuryū Stegoslidon (爆竜ステゴスライドン, Bakuryū Sutegosuraidon), nicknamed "Stego" (ステゴ, Sutego), while siding with the Evoliens as their leader at Lije's request. He is eventually revealed to be a host for half of Dezumozorlya, who kept the Dino Minder's self-destruct mechanism in check, resulting in him joining the Abarangers out of disdain for being manipulated and purging all traces of Dezumozorlya from his body. Near death, he is taken into the atmosphere by Topgaler as the two die in the explosion. Mikoto is temporarily revived a few times after the series. In Kaizoku Sentai Gokaiger, Mikoto appears in a vision to Gai Ikari and grants him the Great Power of the Abarangers, which is GouZyuJin.

=== Allies ===
- Emiri Imanaka (今中 笑里, Imanaka Emiri): A high school student, nicknamed "Emipon" (えみポン), who attempted to become Abare Yellow despite her body being unable to support the transformation. She normally aids the Abarangers by suggesting names and acting as their unofficial member Abare Pink (アバレピンク, Abare Pinku). After the Evoliens' defeat, Emiri becomes Yukito's assistant chiropractor and eventually his wife.
- Ryunosuke Sugishita (杉下 竜之介, Sugishita Ryūnosuke): An old man who runs a curry restaurant called Dino House (恐竜や, Kyōryū-ya), which is the Abarangers' base of operations. When the Bakuryū first came to Another Earth, Sugishita heard their call and nearly became Abare Blue. However, his body could not support the transformation. Kind and supportive, he advises and assists the team whenever possible. After the fight with the Evoliens, Sugishita's business becomes successful. Although in Dekaranger vs. Abaranger he becomes wealthy and opens a worldwide chain of Dino House restaurants which are frequently referenced in later entries of the Super Sentai series, he loses ownership to Yatsudenwani.
- Mai Hakua (伯亜 舞, Hakua Mai): Ryoga's five-year-old niece who is one of the few people to see Lije's spirit.
- Mr. Yokota (横田さん, Yokota-san): A regular customer in Dino House.
- Trinoid #12: Yatsudenwani (トリノイド第12号 ヤツデンワニ, Torinoido Dai Jū-ni-gō Yatsudenwani): A powerful crocodile-themed Trinoid with Fatsia and telephone elements that forced by Abare Killer into serving him while attempting to redeem himself to his creator Mikela. He also stalks Ranru on occasion. He later joins the Dino House as a staff member and, deciding to remain on Another Earth, eventually takes over the restaurant after it becomes a franchise.

=== Wicked Lifeforms Evolien ===
The Wicked Lifeforms Evolien (邪命体エヴォリアン, Jameitai Evorian) are the main antagonists who originate from Dino Earth, residing in the Invasion Garden (侵略の園, Shinryaku no Sono) fortress with the Tree of Life (生命の樹, Seimei no Ki) as its core. They utilize amoeba-based Barmia Soldiers (バーミア兵, Bāmia-hei) as their army, along with black and white variants called Gelru (ゲルル, Geruru) and Zolru (ゾルル, Zoruru) respectively, and Fortress Lifeform Anomalogaris (要塞生命体アノマロガリス, Yōsai Seimeitai Anomarogarisu) battleships to turn Dino Earth into a desert wasteland in an event known as the 200 Days of Darkness (闇の二百日, Yami no Nihyaku-nichi).

- Wicked Life God Dezumozorlya (邪命神デズモゾーリャ, Jameishin Dezumozōrya): A parasitic entity the Evoliens revere as a god who was held in the meteorite that crashed to Another Earth with its being split along with the planet. Each half takes a resident of their respective Earth as a host and transmigrated through their descendants, said to have influenced history in negative ways. Piror to the series, Mikoto held the essence of the inactive Another Earth-counterpart while the Dezumozorlya of Dino Earth resided in Tree of Life before taking a host in Lije through Mahoro. But once Lije became Lijewel, Dezumozorlya entered a dormant state until coming in contact with Mikoto and seeking to rejoin its other half at the cost of the hosts' lives to assimilate all life. After being purged from Lijewel, Dezumozorlya sought stronger inhuman hosts by merging Mikela and Voffa as a temporary vessel to obtain BakurenOh as a new body and absorb Mikoto. But both attempts failed with the death of the other half and Dezumovorla's demise. This forces Dezumozorlya to merge back into Tree of Life and spread its primal urges throughout the entire Invasion Garden and remake into Dezumogevirus (デズモゲヴァルス, Dezumogevarusu) to invoke a 200 Days of Darkness event on Another Earth. But the Bakuryū manage to destroy their enemy and escape its attempt to take them down it.
- Apostle of Dawn Lije (黎明の使徒リジェ, Reimei no Shito Rije): Dezumozorlya's childlike metatron who was Asuka and Mahoro's unborn child before Dezumozorlya entered the latter's body and took the infant as a host with the power to teleport others to Another Earth with a kiss. But a part of Lije's mind gradually became a separate astral being that supported the Abarangers after Lije force grew herself into an adult form called Apostle of Dawn Lijewel (黎明の使徒リジュエル, Reimei no Shito Rijueru), eventually struggling against Dezumozorlya before being mutated into Dezumolijewel (デズモリジュエル, Dezumorijueru). But the Abarangers help both sides of Lije to merge back together to expel Dezumozorlya, causing Lijewel to revert into an infant that was renamed Mikoto in honor of Mikoto Nakadai. But Mikoto still possessed Lije's ability to travel between the two worlds, allowing Asuka to travel back to Another Earth whenever needed.
- Apostle of Destruction Jeanne (破壊の使徒ジャンヌ, Hakai no Shito Jan'nu): An Evolien commander who was originally Mahoro (マホロ), Asuka's beloved who was captured alongside her brother Mizuho and brainwashed by Dezumozorlya into believing Asuka betrayed them. She killed Geilton for failing in the first attack on Another Earth so she can utilize the ammonite-themed Armor of Darkness (暗黒の鎧, Ankoku no Yoroi). But she loses the armor to Asuka while her mind as Mahoro was restored, aiding the Abarangers in secret against the Evoliens.
- Apostle of Darkness Geilton (闇の使徒ガイルトン, Yami no Shito Gairuton): The first of the Evolien commanders to attack Another Earth, he was originally Mahoro's older brother Mizuho (ミズホ). Like Mahoro, believing Asuka had betrayed them and must be punished, discarded his old name. He managed to defeat Asuka in battle and take possession of the Armor of Darkness, being one of the few users to retain his mind. Once on Another Earth, Geilton led the attack with the Bakuryū and an Anomalogaris. But after his defeat, mortally wounded, he had Jeanne kill him so she can use the Armor of Darkness to fulfill their revenge on Asuka.
- Apostle of Creation Mikela (創造の使徒ミケラ, Sōzō no Shito Mikera) and Apostle of Infinity Voffa (無限の使徒ヴォッファ, Mugen no Shito Voffa): Second ranked Evolien commanders who were originally an amoebic creature before exposure to Dezumozorlya evolved them to their current state, able to use Life Berries (生命の実, Seimei no Mi) from the Tree of Life to create Wicked Lifeforms (邪命体, Jameitai). Mikela, short for Mikela Hyen Engakin Metsa Kutsa Demosgowin (ミケラ・ヒェン・エンガキン・メッツァ・クーツァ・デーモスゴーウィン, Mikera Hyen Engakin Mettsa Kūtsa Dēmosugōwin), is an artist who paints human-sized Trinoids (トリノイド, Torinoido), numbered monsters that are each a fusion of an animal, plant, and object. Voffa is a composer who creates giant-sized Giganoids (ギガノイド, Giganoido), monsters named after classical music pieces, from his compositions. The duo's fanatical loyalty to Dezumozorlya make them compliant to be merged into his temporary host body Dezumovorla (デズモヴォーラ, Dezumovōra), only to be destroyed by KillerOh.
- Killerghost (キラーゴースト, Kirāgosuto): A Wicked Lifeform created by Mikoto using a Life Berry, modeled after Abare Killer's Abare Mode, with Mikoto speaking through the monster. It steals five of the Bakuryū to force the Abarangers into playing Mikoto's sick game where they must destroy Killerghost to save their friends from being melted down. Killerghost is destroyed by Abare Max. Lijewel later creates a stronger variant of Killerghost known as Lijewloid Killerghost II (リジュエロイド キラーゴーストII世, Rijueroido Kirāgosuto Ni-sei), which is destroyed by Abare Black.
- Trinoid #0: Saunaginnan (トリノイド第0号 サウナギンナン, Torinoido Dai Zero-gō Saunagin'nan; Dekaranger vs. Abaranger): An eel-themed Trinoid created with elements of a sauna and a ginkgo who is an antagonist in Dekaranger vs. Abaranger with the ability to revive the dead. Being the first Trinoid created, Saunaginnan was sealed away by Mikela in fear of his power before being freed by the Alienizer Kazak in a scheme to resurrect Dezumozorlya. But he ends up revived Abare Killer by accident and is destroyed by the teamwork of Killer AbarenOh and Super Dekaranger Robo.
- Trinoid #24: Abarangekko (トリノイド第24号 アバレンゲッコー, Torinoido Dai Nijū-yon-gō Abarengekkō): An Abaranger-like Trinoid with additional elements of a gecko and Astragalus sinicus who is an antagonist in Bakuryū Sentai Abaranger 20th: The Unforgivable Abare. Created as a contingency should the Evoliens get defeated, sealed away in a pocket dimension until the events of Bakuryū Sentai Abaranger With Donbrothers, Abarangekko is tasked to gather enough negative energy to turn Another Earth into a desert planet and revives Mikoto while directed to an anti-Abaranger influencer. Though he enlarges after being defeated, he is destroyed by Super Abare Max.

== Episodes ==
No.	Title	Directed by	Written by	Original release date
1	"Abare Dinosaur Big Charge!" "Abare Kyōryū Dai Shingeki!" (Japanese: アバレ恐竜大進撃!)	Hajime Konaka	Naruhisa Arakawa	February 16, 2003
2	"Birth! AbarenOh" "Tanjō! Abaren'ō" (Japanese: 誕生! アバレンオー)	Hajime Konaka	Naruhisa Arakawa	February 23, 2003
3	"An Abare-Style Children's Hero" "Kozure Hīrō Abare-kei" (Japanese: 子連れヒーローアバレ系)	Satoshi Morota	Naruhisa Arakawa	March 2, 2003
4	"Completed! The Secret Abare Base" "Kansei! Himitsu Abare Kichi" (Japanese: 完成! 秘密アバレ基地)	Satoshi Morota	Naruhisa Arakawa	March 9, 2003
5	"Abare Cure! Bubububuum!" "Abare Chiryō! Jajajajān" (Japanese: アバレ治療! ジャジャジャジャーン)	Katsuya Watanabe	Naruhisa Arakawa	March 16, 2003
6	"Abare Idol-Aged Daughter" "Abare Aidoru Fuke Musume" (Japanese: アバレアイドル老け娘)	Katsuya Watanabe	Yoshio Urasawa	March 23, 2003
7	"Abare Baby Bakuryū" "Abare Akachan Bakuryū" (Japanese: アバレ赤ちゃん爆竜)	Hajime Konaka	Naruhisa Arakawa	March 30, 2003
8	"Abare Black, This One-Shot!" "Abare Burakku Kono Ippatsu!" (Japanese: アバレブラックこの一発!)	Hajime Konaka	Naruhisa Arakawa	April 6, 2003
9	"Awaken!! Abare Survivor" "Mezameyo! Abare Sabaibā" (Japanese: 目覚めよ! アバレサバイバー)	Satoshi Morota	Atsushi Maekawa	April 13, 2003
10	"Abare Leaguer Bind" "Abare Rīgā Kanashibari" (Japanese: アバレリーガー金縛り)	Satoshi Morota	Yoshio Urasawa	April 20, 2003
11	"Abare Psychic. Oink." "Abare Saikikku. Buhi." (Japanese: アバレサイキック。ブヒっ。)	Satoshi Morota	Naruhisa Arakawa	April 27, 2003
12	"The Abare Saw Cuts Through Kyoto!" "Abare Nokogiri, Kyōto o Kiru!" (Japanese: アバレノコギリ、京都を斬る!)	Katsuya Watanabe	Naruhisa Arakawa	May 4, 2003
13	"The Abare Hand Topknot!" "Abarete Chonmage!" (Japanese: アバレてチョンマゲ!)	Katsuya Watanabe	Naruhisa Arakawa	May 11, 2003
14	"Discovery! Abaresaurus" "Hakkutsu! Abaresaurusu" (Japanese: 発掘! アバレサウルス)	Taro Sakamoto	Sho Aikawa	May 18, 2003
15	"The Abare World Is Just Demons" "Abare Seken wa Oni Bakari" (Japanese: アバレ世間は鬼ばかり)	Taro Sakamoto	Atsushi Maekawa	May 25, 2003
16	"Riding! Abare Surfing" "Notteke! Abare Sāfin" (Japanese: 乗ってけ! アバレサーフィン)	Taro Sakamoto	Atsushi Maekawa	June 1, 2003
17	"The Battlefield's Abare-Strut" "Senjō no Abare Kappore" (Japanese: 戦場のアバレかっぽれ)	Shojiro Nakazawa	Yoshio Urasawa	June 8, 2003
18	"Who Is It? It's Abare Killer!" "Dare da? Abare Kirā da!" (Japanese: 誰だ? アバレキラーだ!)	Shojiro Nakazawa	Naruhisa Arakawa	June 22, 2003
19	"Greetings, Abare Amigo" "Yoroshiku Abare Amīgo" (Japanese: よろしくアバレアミーゴ)	Katsuya Watanabe	Naruhisa Arakawa	June 29, 2003
20	"KillerOh, The Abare Beginning!" "Kirāō, Abare Zome!" (Japanese: キラーオー、アバレ初め!)	Katsuya Watanabe	Sho Aikawa	July 13, 2003
21	"Abare Love! Kylokylo" "Abare Koi! Kirokiro" (Japanese: アバレ恋! キロキロ)	Taro Sakamoto	Yoshio Urasawa	July 20, 2003
22	"The Girl Group's Abare Song" "Musume-tachi no Abare Uta" (Japanese: 娘たちのアバレ歌)	Taro Sakamoto	Naruhisa Arakawa	July 27, 2003
23	"Abare EM Wave Dogyuun!" "Abare Denpa Dogyūn!" (Japanese: アバレ電波ドギューン!)	Katsuya Watanabe	Naruhisa Arakawa	August 3, 2003
24	"Abare Schoolgirls! Unbelieeevable" "Abare Joshi Kōsei! Arienāi" (Japanese: アバレ女子高生! ありえな～い)	Katsuya Watanabe	Sho Aikawa	August 10, 2003
25	"Better Fortune! Abare Shinto Offering" "Kaiun! Abare Ema" (Japanese: 開運! アバレ絵馬)	Shojiro Nakazawa	Naruhisa Arakawa	August 17, 2003
26	"Fishing Idiot Abare Diary, Domodomo" "Tsuri Baka Abare Nisshi, Domodomo" (Japanese: 釣りバカアバレ日誌、どもども)	Shojiro Nakazawa	Atsushi Maekawa	August 24, 2003
27	"AbaRed Is Abare Blue" "Abareddo wa Abare Burū" (Japanese: アバレッドはアバレブルー)	Taro Sakamoto	Takeshi Suzuki	August 31, 2003
28	"The Bride Is Abare-chan" "Hanayome wa Abare-chan" (Japanese: 花嫁はアバレチャン)	Taro Sakamoto	Naruhisa Arakawa	September 7, 2003
29	"The Selfish Apostle, Abare Contest" "Wagamama Shito, Abare Sōdatsusen" (Japanese: わがまま使徒、アバレ争奪戦)	Katsuya Watanabe	Yoshio Urasawa	September 14, 2003
30	"Ultimate Evil! Abarevolien Formation" "Saikyō! Abarevorian Kessei" (Japanese: 最凶! アバレヴォリアン結成)	Katsuya Watanabe	Naruhisa Arakawa	September 21, 2003
31	"That Abare, Become the Ultimate" "Sono Abare, Kyūkyoku ni Tsuki" (Japanese: そのアバレ、究極につき)	Satoshi Morota	Naruhisa Arakawa	September 28, 2003
32	"Abare Bakuryū Full Throttle" "Abare Bakuryū Furu Surottoru" (Japanese: アバレ爆竜フルスロットル)	Satoshi Morota	Naruhisa Arakawa	October 5, 2003
33	"Don't Forget the Abare Warrior" "Abare Senshi o Wasurenai" (Japanese: アバレ戦士を忘れない)	Shojiro Nakazawa	Sho Aikawa	October 12, 2003
34	"Let's Play the Game! Assault Planet Abare" "Gēmu o Yarō! Totsugeki Abare Boshi" (Japanese: ゲームをやろう! 突撃アバレ星)	Shojiro Nakazawa	Naruhisa Arakawa	October 19, 2003
35	"The Quick-Changing Abare Nadeshiko!" "Abare Nadeshiko Shichi Henge Tai!" (Japanese: アバレナデシコ七変化たい!)	Taro Sakamoto	Naruhisa Arakawa	October 26, 2003
36	"The First-Love Abare Miracle" "Hatsukoi Abare Mirakuru" (Japanese: 初恋アバレミラクル)	Taro Sakamoto	Sho Aikawa	November 2, 2003
37	"The Pleasurable Abare Queen" "Kaikan Abare Kuīn" (Japanese: 快感アバレクイーン)	Satoshi Morota	Naruhisa Arakawa	November 9, 2003
38	"The Blooming Abare Pink" "Hanasakeru Abare Pinku" (Japanese: 花咲けるアバレピンク)	Satoshi Morota	Atsushi Maekawa	November 16, 2003
39	"Good Luck! Abare Father" "Ganbare! Abare Fāzā" (Japanese: がんばれ! アバレファーザー)	Satoshi Morota	Atsushi Maekawa	November 23, 2003
40	"The Abare Armor Beheading!" "Abare Yoroi o Kire!" (Japanese: アバレ鎧を斬れ!)	Noboru Takemoto	Naruhisa Arakawa	November 30, 2003
41	"Merry Abaremas! Jamejame" "Merī Abaremasu! Jamejame" (Japanese: メリーアバレマス! ジャメジャメ)	Noboru Takemoto	Sho Aikawa	December 7, 2003
42	"The Thing Hidden in the Abare Kid" "Abare Kiddo ni Hisomishi Mono" (Japanese: アバレキッドに潜みしもの)	Taro Sakamoto	Sho Aikawa	December 14, 2003
43	"Abare Killer Is Inextinguishable!?" "Abare Kirā wa Fumetsu!?" (Japanese: アバレキラーは不滅!?)	Taro Sakamoto	Sho Aikawa	December 21, 2003
44	"Is the Salaryman a Dreaming Abare Trick?" "Sararīman wa Abare Jikake no Yume o Miru ka?" (Japanese: サラリーマンはアバレ仕掛けの夢を見るか?)	Taro Sakamoto	Atsushi Maekawa	December 28, 2003
45	"New Year Abare Rumba" "Akemashite Abare Runba" (Japanese: あけましてアバレルンバ)	Shojiro Nakazawa	Yoshio Urasawa	January 4, 2004
46	"Praying! Abare Visual Kei" "Inotte! Abare Bijuaru-kei" (Japanese: 祈って! アバレビジュアル系)	Shojiro Nakazawa	Naruhisa Arakawa	January 11, 2004
47	"The Five Abarangers" "Gonin no Abarenjā" (Japanese: 5人のアバレンジャー)	Satoshi Morota	Atsushi Maekawa	January 18, 2004
48	"The Final Abare Game" "Fainaru Abare Gēmu" (Japanese: ファイナルアバレゲーム)	Satoshi Morota	Sho Aikawa	January 25, 2004
49	"Break In! Abare Final Decisive Battle" "Totsunyū! Abare Saishū Kessen" (Japanese: 突入! アバレ最終決戦)	Taro Sakamoto	Naruhisa Arakawa	February 1, 2004
50 (Final)	"Only Those Who've Abare'd" "Abareta Kazu dake" (Japanese: アバレた数だけ)	Taro Sakamoto	Naruhisa Arakawa	February 8, 2004

== Films ==
=== Theatrical ===
==== Deluxe: Abare Summer Is Freezing Cold! ====
Bakuryū Sentai Abaranger Deluxe: Abare Summer Is Freezing Cold! (爆竜戦隊アバレンジャー DELUXE アバレサマーはキンキン中!, Bakuryū Sentai Abarenjā Derakkusu Abare Samā wa Kinkin Chū) is a 2003 film, which takes place between episodes 21 and 22 and was written by Naruhisa Arakawa and directed by Satoshi Morota.

=== V-Cinema ===
- Bakuryū Sentai Abaranger vs. Hurricaneger (爆竜戦隊アバレンジャーVSハリケンジャー, Bakuryū Sentai Abarenjā Tai Harikenjā): A 2004 V-Cinema release, which takes place between episodes 40 and 41 and was written by Atsushi Maekawa and directed by Katsuya Watanabe.
- Tokusou Sentai Dekaranger vs. Abaranger (特捜戦隊デカレンジャーVSアバレンジャー, Tokusō Sentai Dekarenjā Tai Abarenjā): A 2005 V-Cinema release, which takes place between episodes 31 and 32 of Tokusou Sentai Dekaranger and was written by Naruhisa Arakawa and directed by Taro Sakamoto.
- GoGo Sentai Boukenger vs. Super Sentai (轟轟戦隊ボウケンジャーVSスーパー戦隊, Gōgō Sentai Bōkenjā Tai Sūpā Sentai): A 2007 V-Cinema release, which takes place between episodes 42 and 43 of GoGo Sentai Boukenger and was written by Akatsuki Yamatoya and directed by Katsuya Watanabe.
- Bakuryū Sentai Abaranger 20th: The Unforgivable Fury (爆竜戦隊アバレンジャー 20th 許されざるアバレ, Bakuryū Sentai Abarenjā Tuentīsu Yurusarezaru Abare): A 2023 V-Cinema release, which takes place twenty years after the series finale and was written by Naruhisa Arakawa and directed by Hisashi Kimura.

=== Other Specials ===
- Bakuryū Sentai Abaranger Super Video: The All-Bakuryū Roaring Laughter Battle (爆竜戦隊アバレンジャー スーパービデオ オール爆竜爆笑バトル, Bakuryū Sentai Abarenjā Sūpā Bideo Ōru Bakushō Batoru): A 2003 Kodansha Super Video special.
- Bakuryū Sentai Abaranger With Donbrothers (爆竜戦隊アバレンジャーwithドンブラザーズ, Bakuryū Sentai Abarenjā Wizu Donburazāzu): A 2023 Toei Tokusatsu Fan Club-exclusive special that is a prequel to Bakuryū Sentai Abaranger 20th: The Unforgivable Abare.

== Cast ==
- Ryoga Hakua: Koichiro Nishi (西 興一朗, Nishi Kōichirō)
- Yukito Sanjo: Sho Tomita (富田 翔, Tomita Shō)
- Ranru Itsuki: Aiko Itō (いとう あいこ, Itō Aiko)
- Asuka: Kaoru Abe (阿部 薫, Abe Kaoru)
- Mikoto Nakadai: Koutaro Tanaka (田中 幸太朗, Tanaka Kōtarō)
- Emiri Imanaka, Princess Saki (笑姫, Saki-hime; 12–13), Angel (36), Chiropractor (44): Michi Nishijima (西島 未智, Nishijima Michi)
- Ryunosuke Sugishita, Tatsunosuke Sugishita (杉下 龍之介, Sugishita Tatsunosuke; 13), God (36), Manager Sugiue (杉上部長, Sugiue-buchō; 44): Kouen Okumura (奥村 公延, Okumura Kōen)
- Mai Hakua: Maya Banno (坂野 真弥, Banno Maya)
- Mr. Yokota: Taro Suwa (諏訪 太朗, Suwa Tarō)
- Lije, Mysterious girl: Kasumi Suzuki (鈴木 かすみ, Suzuki Kasumi)
- Lijewel: Maki Ogawa (小川 摩起, Ogawa Maki)
- Mahoro/Jeanne: Eri Sakurai (桜井 映里, Sakurai Eri)
- Mizuho/Geilton: Masashi Kagami (加々美 正史, Kagami Masashi)

=== Voice cast ===
- Bakuryū Tyrannosaurus: Takashi Nagasako (長嶝 高士, Nagasako Takashi)
- Bakuryū Triceratops: Kōki Miyata (宮田 幸季, Miyata Kōki)
- Bakuryū Pteranodon: Emi Shinohara (篠原 恵美, Shinohara Emi)
- Bakuryū Brachiosaurus: Banjō Ginga (銀河 万丈, Ginga Banjō)
- Bakuryū Topgaler: Hikaru Midorikawa (緑川 光, Midorikawa Hikaru)
- Bakuryū Bachycelonagurus (爆竜バキケロナグルス, Bakuryū Bakikeronagurusu): Sayaka Aida (相田 さやか, Aida Sayaka)
- Bakuryū Dimenokodon ((爆竜ディメノコドン): Daisuke Kishio (岸尾 だいすけ, Kishio Daisuke)
- Bakuryū Stegoslidon: Hiroshi Iida (飯田 浩志, Iida Hiroshi)
- Bakuryū Parasarokkiru (爆竜パラサロッキル): Kōzō Shioya (塩屋 浩三, Shioya Kōzō)
- Bakuryū Ankyloveilus (爆竜アンキロベイルス, Bakuryū Ankirobeirusu): Akemi Misaki (御崎 朱美, Misaki Akemi)
- Dezumozorlya/Dezumolijewel/Dezumovorla/Dezumogevirus: Masaharu Satō (佐藤 正治, Satō Masaharu)
- Mikela: Bunkō Ogata (緒方 文興, Ogata Bunkō)
- Voffa: Hidenari Ugaki (宇垣 秀成, Ugaki Hidenari)
- Yatsudenwani: Kyōsei Tsukui (津久井 教生, Tsukui Kyōsei)

=== Guest cast ===
- Takaaki Utsumi (内海孝明, Utsumi Takaaki; 4): Kyosuke Ikeda (池田恭祐, Ikeda Kyōsuke)
- Bucky Bonds (バッキー・バンズ, Bakkī Banzu; 10): Samuel Pop Aning (サムエル・ポップ・エニング, Samueru Poppu Eningu)
- Denjiro Tatsuyoshi (辰吉伝次郎, Tatsuyoshi Denjirō; 14): Shun Ueda (うえだ峻, Ueda Shun)
- Soichiro Sanjo (三条総一郎, Sanjō Sōichirō; 15–16): Takeshi Obayashi (大林丈史, Ōbayashi Takeshi)
- Recording Studio Staff (22-23): Toshihiro Yashiba (矢柴俊博, Yashiba Toshihiro)
- Honami (ホナミ, Honami; 27): Tamao Yoshimura (吉村 玉緒, Yoshimura Tamao)
- Kerato (ケラト, Kerato; 36): Ryunosuke Kamiki (神木 隆之介, Kamiki Ryūnosuke)
- Ran Izumo (出雲蘭, Izumo Ran; 46): Masashi Taniguchi (谷口 賢志, Taniguchi Masashi)

=== Spin-off cast ===
- Princess Freezia (王女フリージア, Ōjo Furījia; Abaranger Deluxe): Minako Komukai (小向 美奈子, Komukai Minako)
- Wiseman Akgul (賢者アクガル, Kenja Akugaru; Abaranger Deluxe): Naoya Makoto (誠 直也, Makoto Naoya)
- Dimensional Drifter Galvidi (次元の流れ者 ガルヴィディ, Jigen no Nagaremono Garuvidi; Voice; Abaranger Deluxe): Toshio Furukawa (古川 登志夫, Furukawa Toshio)
- Hexanoid #1 Hanabikinikibeenus (ヘキサノイド第1号 ハナビキニキビーナス, Hekisanoido Dai Ichi-gō Hanabikinikibīnasu; Voice; Abaranger Deluxe): Yumi Takada (高田 由美, Takada Yumi)
- Evil Ninja Iga (邪忍イーガ, Janin Īga; Voice; Abaranger vs. Hurricaneger): Kiyoyuki Yanada (梁田 清之, Yanada Kiyoyuki)

== Songs ==
Opening theme

- "Bakuryū Sentai Abaranger" (爆竜戦隊アバレンジャー, Bakuryū Sentai Abarenjā)
  - Lyrics: Yumi Yoshimoto
  - Composition: Takafumi Iwasaki
  - Arrangement: Seiichi Kyōda
  - Artist: Masaaki Endoh

Ending theme

- "We are the ONE ~Bokura wa Hitotsu~" (We are the ONE ～僕らはひとつ～)
  - Lyrics: Yumi Yoshimoto
  - Composition: Yasuo Kosugi
  - Arrangement: Seiichi Kyōda
  - Artist: Akira Kushida
