= Koichiro Nishi =

Japanese actor

- 西 興一朗
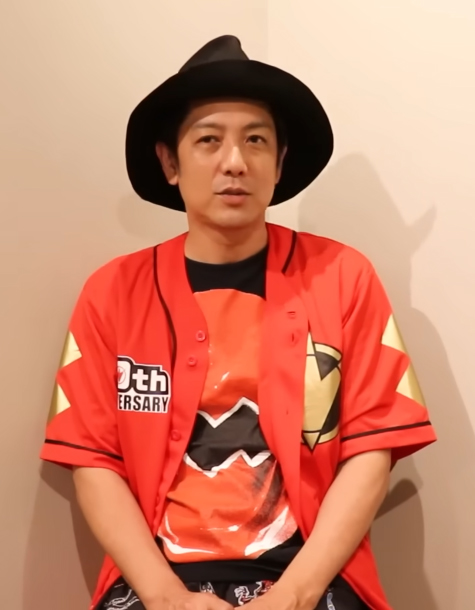
- Nishi in 2024
- Born: October 17, 1979 (age 46); Komatsu, Shūsō District (Now part of Saijō City), Ehime, Japan
- Occupation: Actor
- Years active: 2002-present
- Height: 178 cm (5 ft 10 in)

Koichiro Nishi (西 興一朗, Nishi Kōichirō; born October 17, 1979 in Ehime Prefecture) is a Japanese actor who is affiliated with CES. He played the role of Ryoga Hakua (Aba Red) in the 2003 Super Sentai TV series Bakuryū Sentai Abaranger.

== Biography ==
Nishi debuted as a model in 2002. In 2003, he starred in Bakuryū Sentai Abaranger as Ryoga Hakua/Aba Red. In 2014, Nishi reprised that role in Zyuden Sentai Kyoryuger vs. Go-Busters: The Great Dinosaur Battle! Farewell Our Eternal Friends. On May 5, 2015, he was married.

== Filmography ==
=== TV series ===
Year	Title	Role	Network	Other notes
2003–2004	Bakuryū Sentai Abaranger	Ryoga Hakua/Aba Red	TV Asahi	Main Role
2009	Tokyo Girl	Koji Toyota	BS-TBS	Episode 3
2009	Kamen Rider W	Kenji Kurata/Arms Dopant	TV Asahi	Episodes 15 and 16
2012	Ataru	Yoichi Mori	TBS	Episode 10
2013	Galileo		Fuji TV	Episodes 10 and 11
2024–2025	Ultraman Arc	Hiroshi Ban	TV Tokyo	Main Role

=== Films ===
Year	Title	Role	Other notes
2003	Bakuryū Sentai Abaranger DELUXE: Abare Summer is Freezing Cold!	Ryoga Hakua/Aba Red	Main Role
2004	Bakuryū Sentai Abaranger vs. Hurricaneger	Ryoga Hakua/Aba Red	Main Role
2005	Tokusou Sentai Dekaranger vs. Abaranger	Ryoga Hakua/Aba Red	Main Role
2007	Carved		
2008	Chameleon		
2014	Zyuden Sentai Kyoryuger vs. Go-Busters: The Great Dinosaur Battle! Farewell Our Eternal Friends	Ryoga Hakua/Aba Red	Main Role
2023	Bakuryū Sentai Abaranger 20th: The Unforgivable Abare	Ryoga Hakua/Aba Red	Main Role
2025	Ultraman Arc The Movie: The Clash of Light and Evil	Hiroshi Ban	Main Role
