= Koutaro Tanaka =

Japanese actor

- 田中 幸太朗
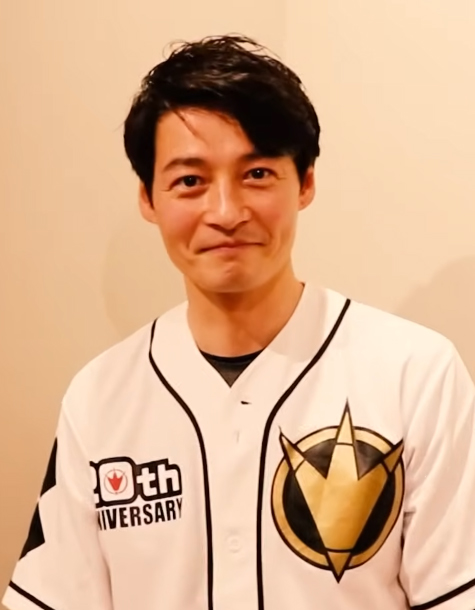
- Tanaka in 2024
- Born: December 13, 1982 (age 43); Tokyo, Japan
- Occupation: Actor
- Years active: 2000–present
- Agent: Stardust Promotion
- Website: Official profile at Stardust Promotion

Koutaro Tanaka (田中 幸太朗, Tanaka Kōtarō; born December 13, 1982, in Tokyo, Japan) is a Japanese actor who is affiliated with Stardust Promotion.

== Filmography ==
=== Films ===
Year	Title	Role	Other notes	Ref.
2001	Waterboys	Kotaro Nakata		
2027	Akiramemasen!			

=== Television series ===
Year	Title	Role	Other notes	Ref.
2003–2004	Bakuryū Sentai Abaranger	Mikoto Nakadai / Abare Killer	Episode 17 - 48	
2007	Fūrin Kazan	Kasuga Gengoro	Taiga drama	
2012	Taira no Kiyomori	Mitsuyasu	Taiga drama	
2014	Gunshi Kanbei	Manmi Senchiyo	Taiga drama	
2022	Hiru	Detective Satō		
2025	Unbound	Shimazu Shigehide	Taiga drama	
2026	Salvation, Swallowed by the Nest	Tanuma		
