= List of Unofficial Sentai Akibaranger characters =

Unofficial Sentai Akibaranger (非公認戦隊アキバレンジャー, Hikōnin Sentai Akibarenjā) is a tokusatsu series produced by the Toei Company that parodies their long-running Super Sentai franchise.

== Main characters ==
=== Akibarangers ===
The Akibarangers transformed (Season 1). From left to right: Yumeria Moegi, Nobuo Akagi, and Mitsuki Aoyagi.

The eponymous Akibarangers are three otakus and fans of an in-universe anime called Nijiyome Academy Z-Cune Aoi (にじよめ学園 ズキューーン葵, Nijiyome Gakuen Zukyūn Aoi) who live in the Akihabara district of Tokyo and were given special technology by a scientist named Hiroyo Hakase to fight the Stema Otsu Corporation. Initially, the Akibarangers end up in a shared daydream state known as the Delusion World (妄想世界, Mōsō Sekai), where they use the power of their imagination to fight Stema Otsu. After their enemies start appearing in the real world, the Akibarangers subsequently materialize their transformed alter-egos to combat them and eventually obtain the ability to transform directly in the real world.

The Akibarangers use "Delusion Power" (妄想パワー, Mōsō Pawā) and the multi-purpose figurine-like MMZ-01 Moe Moe Z-Cune (MMZ-01 モエモエズキューーン, Emu Emu Zetto Zero Wan Moe Moe Zukyūn) to transform, transfer their minds to the Delusion World, and maintain contact with each other and Hiroyo. While transformed, they can perform the Akibaship Attack (アキバシップアタック, Akibashippu Atakku) and wield the MMZ-01 in its handgun mode, which allows them to perform the Normal Attack (Temporary) (通常攻撃（仮）, Tsūjō Kōgeki Kakkokari) and the Moe Magnum (萌えマグナム, Moe Magunamu) finisher. Additionally, with New Akiba Red, the team can perform the Heart-Technique-Body Attack (心技体アタック, Shin Gi Tai Atakku).

==== Nobuo Akagi ====
Nobuo Akagi (赤木 信夫, Akagi Nobuo) is an average 29-year-old man and fan of the Super Sentai franchise who works as a deliveryman at Sasaki Pom Poko Delivery (佐々木ポンポコデリバリー, Sasaki Pon Poko Deribarī), still lives with his mother, and is prone to daydreaming about being a hero. After being recruited into the Akibarangers, he becomes the team's leader Akiba Red (アキバレッド, Akiba Reddo) using his vast knowledge of Super Sentai, such as its characters and tropes.

In Season Tsuu, Akagi manifests the figurine-like MMZ-02 Munyu Munyu Zubaaan (MMZ-02 ムニュムニュズバーーン, Emu Emu Zetto Zero Tsū Munyu Munyu Zubān), which can transform into a knife and grants him the ability to transform into the armored Super Akiba Red (超アキバレッド, Chō Akiba Reddo). In this form, he gains increased attack power and the ability to perform the Munyu Slash (ムニュスラッシュ, Munyu Surasshu) finisher. Additionally, he can combine the MMZ-02 with the MMZ-01 to form a bayonet-like cannon, with which he can perform the Munyu Moe Prominence (ムニュモエプロミネンス, Munyu Moe Purominensu) and the Munyu Moe Zubasher (ムニュモエズバッシャー, Munyu Moe Zubasshā) finishers. After being enlarged during his fight with Prism Ace, Akagi becomes the golden Super Akiba Red Super (超アキバレッド・スーパー, Chō Akiba Reddo Sūpā) and gains the ability to perform the Big Golden Munyu Slash (巨大ゴールデンムニュスラッシュ, Kyodai Gōruden Munyu Surasshu) finisher.

Nobuo Akagi is portrayed by Masato Wada (和田 正人, Wada Masato) as an adult and Fuku Suzuki (鈴木 福, Suzuki Fuku) as a child.

==== Akiba Blue ====
Akiba Blue (アキバブルー, Akiba Burū) is a moniker utilized by its original user and her successor.

===== Mitsuki Aoyagi =====
Mitsuki Aoyagi (青柳 美月, Aoyagi Mitsuki) is a serious 18-year-old martial artist and closet fan of Z-Cune Aoi who joins the Akibarangers as Akiba Blue to improve her fighting skills. Despite her lack of knowledge of the Super Sentai franchise and discomfort with behaving like a traditional Sentai warrior, she soon warms up to the idea after spending a day watching GoGo Sentai Boukenger and meeting veteran action director Kazuo Niibori.

In Season Tsuu, due to the events of season one being retconned, Aoyagi was scouted to work for the Pentagon instead of Akagi, which led to her leaving for the United States following the Akibarangers' final battle with Stema Otsu.

Mitsuki Aoyagi is portrayed by Kyoko Hinami (日南 響子, Hinami Kyōko).

===== Luna Iwashimizu =====
Luna Iwashimizu (石清水 美月, Iwashimizu Runa) is Mitsuki Aoyagi's replacement as Akiba Blue in Season Tsuu. An aspiring idol, Luna possesses extensive production knowledge of tokusatsu and various other genres. Due to Baros lol's monster, Chief Editor HVD, altering reality and replacing Gosei Sentai Dairanger with the Akibarangers, she is also a fan of the latter group. After noticing the kanji of her first name is written the same as Mitsuki's while her last name contains the kanji for "blue", Akagi and Hiroyo recruit Luna as a replacement, though she believes she is starring in an Akibaranger remake. When the Akibarangers restore Dairanger's place in the Super Sentai franchise, Luna quits upon seeing being with them will not benefit her career goals until Hiroyo negotiates with the former's manager to let the Akibarangers "hire" her. In time, Luna becomes inspired to stay with the group permanently in the hopes that being an Akibaranger will eventually lead to her becoming a star.

Luna Iwashimizu is portrayed by Shione Sawada (澤田 汐音, Sawada Shione).

==== Yumeria Moegi ====
Yuko Yamada (山田 優子, Yamada Yūko), also known by the alias of Yumeria Moegi (萌黄 ゆめりあ, Moegi Yumeria), is an immature 23-year-old cosplayer and fujoshi who daylights as an office worker and draws doujin manga to sell at Comiket on the side before she is recruited into the Akibarangers to serve as Akiba Yellow (アキバイエロー, Akiba Ierō). Due to her experience as a cosplayer, she tends to stay in character, even while transformed, and speaks in an altered voice if her attire is compromised. Additionally, she also possesses knowledge of the Super Sentai franchise, second only to Akagi, and displays a tendency to "go moe" and lose consciousness over a homoerotic scene.

In Season Tsuu, she marries into the wealthy Yokoyama family and starts going by Yuko Yokoyama (「横山 優子」, Yokoyama Yūko) due to her new family disapproving of her otaku lifestyle, though she secretly maintains a manga collection hidden in her bedroom and eventually reconciles with her mother-in-law.

While transformed, Yumeria can use her MMZ-01, charged with her fellow Akibarangers' energies, to perform the Moe Magnum Mega Moe Fire (萌えマグナム・激萌えファイヤー, Moe Magunamu Geki Moe Faiyā) finisher.

Yumeria Moegi is portrayed by Karin Ogino (荻野 可鈴, Ogino Karin).

=== Equipment ===
- Machine Itashar (マシンイタッシャー, Mashin Itasshā): The Akibarangers' red Z-Cune Aoi-decorated itasha Toyota Prius that can transform into a robot called Itashar Robo (イタッシャーロボ, Itasshā Robo) when a Z-Cune Aoi CD is played on the car stereo at full volume. Itashar Robo possesses a wotagei-inspired fighting style and is equipped with the Ita Launchers (痛ランチャー, Ita Ranchā) and the Ita Machine Guns (痛マシンガン, Ita Mashin Gan). After ending up in the real world, Itashar Robo can convert Akihabara store signs into weapons using Delusion Power, such as the Signage Rifle, which can perform the Kanban Bang (カンバンバン, Kanban Ban; lit. Signboard Bang) attack, and the twin Tsundere Swords (ツンデレソード, Tsundere Sōdo).
- Itashar Boy (イタッシャーボーイ, Itasshā Bōi): A smaller version of Itashar Robo that transforms from a toy replica of Machine Itashar. Despite its size, Itashar Boy is strong enough to lift a giant monster with ease.

==== Inordinate Powers ====
The Inordinate Powers (大それた力, Daisoreta Chikara) are varying weapons inspired by past Super Sentai groups and parodies of the Great Powers from Kaizoku Sentai Gokaiger that can be combined to form stronger weapons via Unofficial Combinations (非公認合体, Hikōnin Gattai), such as the Inordinate Cannon Bazooka (ダイソレテルキャノンバズーカ, Daisoreteru Kyanon Bazūka).

- Inordinate Cannon (ダイソレタキャノン, Daisoreta Kyanon): The combination of the following Inordinate Powers:
  - Tokusou Sentai Dekaranger: The Deka Wapper (デカワッパー, Deka Wappā) is a giant set of handcuffs inspired by the Dekarangers' D-Wapper that can be used as a two-handed melee weapon and to trap enemies.
  - GoGo Sentai Boukenger: The Bouken Scooper (ボウケンスコッパー, Bōken Sukoppā) is a giant shovel based on the Boukengers' mecha DaiBouken's Go Scooper that enables the user to burrow underground at high-speeds and perform the Akihabara Underground Culture Attack (秋葉原アンダーグラウンドカルチャーアタック, Akihabara Andāguraundo Karuchā Atakku).
  - Chōjin Sentai Jetman: The Jet Winger (ジェットウインガー, Jetto Uingā) is a jet pack inspired by the Jetmen's Cross Changer that allows the user to perform a Jet Phoenix-esque finisher.
- Inordinate Bazooka (ダイソレタバズーカ, Daisoreta Bazūka): The combination of the following Inordinate Powers:
  - Gosei Sentai Dairanger: The Dairen Bomber (ダイレンボンバー, Dairen Bonbā) are twin hand-themed rifles inspired by the Dairangers' Dai Buster that can be combined into a rifle that resembles the Dairangers' hand positions while performing their Qi-Power Bomber attack.
  - Kyōryū Sentai Zyuranger: The Zyuren Buckler (ジュウレンバックラー, Jūren Bakkurā) is a giant belt buckle inspired by the Zyurangers' Dino Bucklers that allows the user to perform the Dinosaur Power Attack (恐竜パワーアタック, Kyōryū Pawā Atakku).
  - Ninpuu Sentai Hurricaneger: The Hurricane Ball (ハリケンボール, Hariken Bōru) is a mace and chain inspired by the Hurricanegers' Karakuri Ball.

== Recurring characters ==
=== Hiroyo Hakase ===
Hiroyo Hakase (葉加瀬 博世, Hakase Hiroyo), also known by her birth name of Hiroyo Tsuzuki (都築 博世, Tsuzuki Hiroyo) and acting alias Shuri Toyozuki (十夜月 朱里, Toyozuki Shuri), is the owner of the Sentai Café Himitsukichi (戦隊カフェひみつきち, Sentai Kafe Himitsukichi; "Secret Base Sentai Café") in Akihabara, the daughter of Takehiro Tsuzuki, and voice actor for Aoi Ichikawa (市川 葵, Ichikawa Aoi), the protagonist of the in-universe anime Nijiyome Academy Z-Cune Aoi who serves as the Akibarangers' commander after personally recruiting them and supplying them with their MMZ-01 devices, which she received from her father at the Z-Cune Aoi series' wrap-up.

Hiroyo Hakase is portrayed by Maaya Uchida (内田 真礼, Uchida Maaya).

=== Stema Otsu Corporation ===
The Evil Group Stema Otsu Corporation (邪団法人ステマ乙, Jadan Hōjin Sutema Otsu) is an organization dedicated to destroying Akihabara's otaku culture and replacing it with the economy and lifestyle of a different district who were originally created by Takehiro Tsuzuki to serve as villains on Z-Cune Aoi. Later in the series, they are revealed to be a delusion that the Akibarangers created to explain a series of unrelated crimes occurring in Akihabara from their perspective. While Stema Otsu's battles with the Akibarangers originally take place in the Delusion World, Malseena finds a way into the real world to help Doctor Z destroy the barrier between them so their forces can invade reality, though he reorganizes the Stema Otsu Corporation into the Delusion Empire under Saburo Hatte's influence. After Doctor Z reforms, Malseena reestablishes the Stema Otsu Corporation in an attempt to prolong the series, but is forced to wait until Season Tsuu to do so properly due to Hatte ending and retconning certain events from season one.

==== Doctor Z ====
Doctor Z (ドクターZ, Dokutā Zetto) is the Stema Otsu Corporation's head who was originally Takehiro Tsuzuki (都築 丈博, Tsuzuki Takehiro), Hiroyo's father and a brilliant scientist admired by his peers. Due to his undying love for anime, he became divorced and left his job to pursue a career as an anime character designer, eventually getting a job at Studio Bell Village. However, a combination of his increasingly surreal and violent concept sketches and several personal conflicts with the production staff and chief animator led to him being fired from the studio and ostracized from the industry. Returning to his former scientific profession to pay for child support, Takehiro discovered Moeshinsuki Particles (モエシニスキー粒子, Moeshinisukī Ryūshi; lit. "Love moe to death"), which react to human brainwaves and convert delusional images into reality. Despite this major accomplishment, he became the villainous Doctor Z upon discovering Studio Bell Village reworked his character designs into what would become the anime Z-Cune Aoi and disowned his daughter Hiroyo after she secretly became Aoi's voice actress.

Initially disguised as a homeless man, Z oversees Malseena's scheme to tear down the barrier between reality and the Delusion World from afar before revealing himself to Hiroyo and the Akibarangers while taking over the operation. Due to Saburo Hatte's influence however, he puts a curse on Hiroyo meant to take her voice, converts the Stema Otsu Corporation into the Delusion Empire (デリュージョン帝国, Deryūjon Teikoku), and betrays Malseena as his goals become warped. As the Akibarangers fight to stop Hatte from ending their series, Z reforms and reconciles with Hiroyo.

In Season Tsuu, due to the events of season one being retconned, Tsuzuki is stated to be working on a robot project at MIT instead of the Stema Otsu Corporation.

Doctor Z is portrayed by Kazuki Yao (矢尾 一樹, Yao Kazuki).

==== Malseena ====
Malseena (マルシーナ, Marushīna) (Note: Malseena's name is derived from the "©" (Maru Shī; Circled C) and is also written "©na".) is the Akibarangers' reoccurring nemesis who is capable of shapeshifting. Initially believed to be a product of Nobuo Akagi's vision of an ideal enemy for the Akibarangers, she is later revealed to have originated from a rejected concept design for a Z-Cune Aoi villain that Takehiro Tsuzuki created before it was entrusted to Hiroyo.

Throughout season one, Malseena serves as the Stema Otsu Corporation's head of redevelopment and attempts to take over Akihabara until she finds one of Hiroyo's childhood drawings, which causes her to materialize in the real world. In light of this, she manipulates the Akibarangers into destroying the barrier between reality and the Delusion World until she learns of Saburo Hatte's control over them and helps the Akibarangers in their failed attempt to prolong their series until Hatte abruptly cancels them.

Refusing to accept this, an embittered Malseena traveled to Hatte's reality and convinced him to create Season Tsuu. While he retconned the ending of season one to have her as the Stema Otsu Corporation's leader, she is subsequently downgraded to being General Tsuu's subordinate. Despite being at odds with him, she pretends to serve him to take advantage of his schemes before eventually stealing his Super Sentai knowledge so she can create the Super Malseena franchise, in which she plays the lead antagonist in each entry and defeats the Super Sentai teams over the course of 37 years, only to be defeated by Prism Ace of Hatte's corporate rival Chigauyo Productions.

In Season Tsuu, Malseena acquires the MMZ-00 Moya Moya Z-Cune (MMZ-00 モヤモヤズキューーン, Emu Emu Zetto Zero Zero Moya Moya Zukyūn), a dark version of the Akibarangers' MMZ-01 device that allows her to transform into her Battle Mode (バトルモード, Batoru Mōdo) and perform the Moya Blaster (モヤブラスター, Moya Burasutā) finisher.

Malseena is portrayed by Honoka (穂花).

==== Delu Knight ====
Delu Knight (デリューナイト, Deryū Naito) is the Stema Otsu Corporation's executive director. Introduced as part of Saburo Hatte's attempts to rework Akibaranger, Delu Knight initially sees Takuma Tsuzuki as a rival before shifting his attention to Nobuo Akagi and piloting a giant robot called Boomerang Titan (ブーメランタイタン, Būmeran Taitan) due to Hatte's attempts to end the series. Despite their best efforts, the Akibarangers accidentally kill Delu Knight.

In Season Tsuu, due to the events of season one being retconned, Delu Knight appears earlier in the storyline than he originally did before he is killed by the Akibarangers' Inordinate Cannon during their final battle. He is later revived after Kameari Alpaca's death opens a portal for him. After Malseena grants him the ability to alter situations that usually foretell the downfall of Super Sentai villains to his favor, Delu Knight overwhelms the Akibarangers until Super Akiba Red realizes his trick and uses it against him before killing him once more.

In battle, Delu Knight wields a sword that allows him to perform the Delusion Mirage (デリュージョンミラージュ, Deryūjon Mirāju) attack.

Delu Knight is voiced by Hiroaki Hirata (平田 広明, Hirata Hiroaki).

==== Shatieeks ====
The Shatieeks (シャチーク, Shachīku) (Note: Their name is derived from Shachiku (社畜, "Sacrificial Corporate Drones").) are the Stema Otsu Corporation's salaryman-themed foot soldiers who chant business terms such as "Norma" (ノルマ, Noruma; Quota) and "Zangyou" (ザンギョウ（残業）, Zangyō; Overtime). As members of the Delusion Empire, they wear blue military uniforms.

In Season Tsuu, the Shatieeks are voiced by Yuuki Anai (穴井 勇輝, Anai Yūki) and Kazuki Komine (小峰 一己, Komine Kazuki).

==== Chief Clerks ====
The Chief Clerks (係長, Kakarichō) are the Stema Otsu Corporation's Tokyo district/animal-themed monsters who were originally conceived by Doctor Z as Z-Cune Aoi villains. As part of the Stema Otsu Corporation's transition into the Delusion Empire, Doctor Z fires the remaining 40 Chief Clerks and replaces them with Drill Cyclops.

- Shibuya Seitakaawadachisōhigenagaaburamushi (渋谷セイタカアワダチソウヒゲナガアブラムシ): A serious-minded red goldenrod aphid-themed Chief Clerk capable of disguising himself as a pair of Nai and Mea-themed cosplayers. He initially overpowers the Akibarangers until Malseena abandons him, allowing the trio to kill him. Shibuya Seitakaawadachisōhigenagaaburamushi is voiced by Kenji Hamada (浜田 賢二, Hamada Kenji).
- Shibuya Kōzorinahigenagaaburamushi (渋谷コウゾリナヒゲナガアブラムシ; lit. "Shibuya): A brash Picris aphid-themed Chief Clerk who resembles Shibuya Seitakaawadachisōhigenagaaburamushi with gold teeth and possesses a beam that renders targets naked with a bubble sheet covering select parts of their bodies, a separate fire beam, and calling cards he can use as projectiles. Desiring to rid Akihabara of otaku, he accompanies Malseena in terrorizing perverted otaku with unlicensed copies of an upcoming Z-Cune Aoi DVD and strip-away bubble sheets that possess a similar effect as his nudity beam and overpowering the Akibarangers until the trio acquire the Dekarangers' Inordinate Power and kill him with it. Shibuya Kōzorinahigenagaaburamushi is also voiced by Kenji Hamada.
- Kabukichō Mesugurohyōmonchō (歌舞伎町メスグロヒョウモンチョウ): An Argynnis sagana-themed Chief Clerk with a "Guririba Voice" (グリリバ声, Guririba Goe) and a perverted fighting style. He is tasked with abducting women in Akihabara and converting them into hostesses for his namesake district, only to be killed by the Akibarangers via the Boukengers' Inordinate Power. Due to the impression he left on her, Malseena resurrects Mesugurohyōmonchō to help her annex Akihabara into his district by converting all of the former's buildings into host clubs. However, he is defeated by the Akibarangers and Masako Yamada, with the latter causing Malseena to lose affection for him. Kabukichō Mesugurohyōmonchō is voiced by Hikaru Midorikawa (緑川 光, Midorikawa Hikaru), while his human form is portrayed by Shin Koyanagi (小柳 心, Koyanagi Shin).
- Monzen-Nakachō Hashibirokō (門前仲町ハシビロコウ): A shoebill/priest-themed Chief Clerk capable of purifying otaku of their nerdy vices and cause them to live normal lives. He attempts to have Malseena disguise herself as Akiba Blue to overpower the Akibarangers until the real one arrives, causing Malseena to leave and allow the trio to kill Hashibirokō. Monzen-Nakachō Hashibirokō is voiced by Takaya Kuroda (黒田 崇矢, Kuroda Takaya).
- Shimokitazawa Hoya (下北沢ホヤ): An ascidian-themed Chief Clerk who possesses theatrical knowledge. Disguising himself as a scalper, he lures otaku away from Akihabara and into his namesake district with fake idol show tickets. After overpowering the Akibarangers with his theatre skills in their first fight, the trio use the Toei Delusion Studio's cinematic magic to fight back before killing Hoya with the Jetmen's Inordinate Power. Shimokitazawa Hoya is voiced by Taiki Matsuno (松野 太紀, Matsuno Taiki).
- Yoyogi Sujibokehashirigumo (代々木スジボケハシリグモ): A non-humanoid Dolomedes hercules-themed Chief Clerk latched onto the back of a Shatieek, granting the foot soldier enhanced physical capabilities. He steals the Akibarangers' MMZ-01 units and leads them in a high-speed chase before changing into a giant spider. After their fight ends up in the real world, Sujibokehashirigumo is killed by Itashar Robo's Signage Rifle. Yoyogi Sujibokehashirigumo is voiced by Issei Futamata (二又 一成, Futamata Issei).
- Tsukishima Alpaca (月島アルパカ, Tsukishima Arupaka): An alpaca-themed Chief Clerk who specializes in making monjayaki. In a bid to make the Toei Company acknowledge them, the Akibarangers send Tsukishima into the real world and make him undergo intense training methods inspired by various Super Sentai series to make him a worthy opponent. Though he planned for this to gain their trust, the Akibarangers take their fight with Tsukishima seriously out of respect before killing him with the Inordinate Cannon. Tsukishima Alpaca is voiced by Tomokazu Seki (関 智一, Seki Tomokazu).
- Asakusa Alpaca (浅草アルパカ, Asakusa Arupaka): An alpaca-themed Chief Clerk and Tsukishima Alpaca's older brother who claims to be more powerful than him. He attacks Akihabara's citizens with small spatulas containing hot monjayaki until he materializes in the real world, where he takes Sayaka Honiden hostage until Akagi manifests his Akibaranger powers in the real world and kills Asakusa with the Akihabara Underground Culture Attack. Asakusa Alpaca is also voiced by Tomokazu Seki.
- Kameari Alpaca (亀有アルパカ, Kameari Arupaka): An arrogant alpaca-themed Chief Clerk that Malseena secretly manipulated General Tsuu into creating as part of her plot to reestablish the Stema Otsu Corporation and revive Delu Knight via Kameari's death at the Akibarangers' hands. Kameari Alpaca is also voiced by Tomokazu Seki while his human form is portrayed by Takeshi Kusao (草尾 毅, Kusao Takeshi).

=== Saburo Hatte ===
Saburo Hatte (八手 三郎, Hatte Saburō) is a god-like producer who controls Akibaranger, who the series' cast originally believed to be the collective pseudonym for the Toei Company's television producers. After attempting to rework the series by replacing Nobuo Akagi, who quickly discovers what he is doing, and manipulating Doctor Z into reworking the Stema Otsu Corporation into the Delusion Empire, Hatte resolves to cancel the series by abruptly ending the series' storylines, forcing the Akibarangers to kill Doctor Z and Delu Knight, and forcing a "The End" subtitle amidst Malseena's intent to battle the Akibarangers for six months before intervening off-screen. In the season finale, he tricks the Akibarangers into enacting a recap episode with the promise of a second season to cover his losses.

However, he ends up hospitalized and manipulated by Malseena into creating Season Tsuu and eventually changing the Super Sentai franchise into the Super Malseena franchise, though she is forced to care for and keep him alive to maintain her changes. After losing the Super Sentai franchise's time slot to his corporate rival Chigauyo Productions, Hatte reconciles with Malseena before using General Tsuu's body to enter the Delusion World and help the Akibarangers defeat Chigauyo's creation, Prism Ace, to restore the Super Sentai franchise before leaving the hospital.

Saburo Hatte is portrayed by an unidentified stand-in while Ryō Horikawa portrays him while using General Tsuu's body.

=== Baros lol ===
The New Dimensional Intellect Remodeling Underground True Empire Baros lol (新次元頭脳改造地下真帝国バロスｗ, Shinjigen Zunō Kaizō Chika Shinteikoku Barosu Wara), or simply Baros lol, is General Tsuu's past Sentai villain-themed organization, which is named after the villainous organizations of Kagaku Sentai Dynaman, Choudenshi Bioman, Choushinsei Flashman, Hikari Sentai Maskman, Choujyu Sentai Liveman, and Chōjin Sentai Jetman.

==== General Tsuu ====
General Tsuu (ツー将軍, Tsū Shōgun), also known as Tsuguo Ushirozawa (後沢 次男, Usirozawa Tsuguo), is a dental technician and the leader of Baros lol who named himself and based his attire on his favorite Sentai villain, General Kar of Kagaku Sentai Dynaman. Despite acquiring a real world version of Malseena's MMZ-00 Moya Moya Z-Cune and discovering its ability to send his figurines into the Delusion World under mysterious means, Tsuu is initially unaware of the effects his monsters have on the real world until Malseena informs him following Yuru-Chara Jigen's defeat. After meeting the Akibarangers in the real world, he gains the means to travel to the Delusion World himself, only to be defeated by the Akibarangers and betrayed by Malseena, who absorbs his Sentai knowledge before killing him. As a result of his persona's death, Ushirozawa resumes his livelihood.

General Tsuu is portrayed by Ryō Horikawa (堀川 りょう, Horikawa Ryō).

==== Oneeders ====
The Oneeders (オネェダー, Onēdā) are Baros lol's effeminate men-themed foot soldiers who possess a disturbing fighting style, wield swords that read "Oh!", and chant random beauty tips.

The Oneeders are voiced by Yuuki Anai (穴井 勇輝, Anai Yūki) and Hiromi Takeuchi (竹内 裕美, Takeuchi Hiromi).

==== Monsters ====
Baros lol's past Sentai villain-themed monsters who are capable of changing reality that General Tsuu creates from crafting figurines and bringing them to life by sending them to the Delusion World via the MMZ-00's built-in Mososo (妄想送, Mōsōsō; lit. "Delusion Transport") system in order to undermine the Akibarangers' unyielding devotion to anime and the Super Sentai franchise.

- Chief Clerk Blu-Ray (ブルーレイ係長, Burūrei Kakarichō): A Gorma Minion armed with a universal remote control that he can use to manipulate time, change the form of inanimate objects, and fire the Downconvert Beam (ダウンコンバートビーム, Daunconbāto Bīmu), which downgrades the quality of a target. He disguises himself as an electronics salesman to con otaku into fulfilling their fantasies through a video player until Blu-Ray is killed by the Akibarangers via the Inordinate Cannon. Blu-Ray is voiced by Kappei Yamaguchi (山口 勝平, Yamaguchi Kappei) while his human form is portrayed by Beauty Kokubu (ビューティーこくぶ, Byūtī Kokubu).
- Chief Editor HVD (HVD編集長, Eichi Bui Dī Henshūchō): A Gorma Minion who resembles Blu-Ray, claims to be 40 times as powerful as him, and can fire a Marking Beam (マーキングビーム, Mākingu Bīmu) to tag targets for tracking. HVD alters reality by turning Gosei Sentai Dairanger into Chūka Sentai Chinaman and replacing it with Gosei Sentai Akibaranger, but is killed by Akiba Red via the Dairangers' Inordinate Power, which restores Dairanger. HVD is also voiced by Kappei Yamaguchi.
- Smapho Monger (スマホモンガー, Sumaho Mongā): A Machine Lifeform with a LCD screen face, which allows him to perform the Monster Info Distribution Attack and Monger Mental Download attacks, and the ability to disguise himself as a human Christian missionary who preaches otakus' vices. Malseena uses Smapho Monger to destroy the Z-Cune Aoi franchise and torture otaku by giving them spoilers to their favorite programming, but Super Akiba Red thwarts them before killing Smapho Monger. Smapho Monger is voiced by Katsuyuki Konishi (小西 克幸, Konishi Katsuyuki), while his human form is portrayed by Takayuki Shibasaki (柴崎 貴行, Shibasaki Takayuki).
- Kunimasmaphogany (クニマスマホガニー, Kunimasumahoganī): The kunimasu, smartphone, and mahogany-themed cousin of Smapho Monger and Trinoid Number 23. After altering reality so that Super Sentai originated from the American TV series franchise Powerful Rangers instead of the other way around and began with an illegal version of Hyakujuu Sentai Gaoranger, he assists Malseena and the Americanized Tyranno Ranger and Dragon Ranger in attacking the Akibarangers until Kunimasmaphogany is killed by Akiba Blue via the Zyurangers' Inordinate Power, undoing the change. Kunimasmaphogany is also voiced by Katsuyuki Konishi.
- Yuru-Chara Jigen (ユルキャラジゲン, Yurukyara Jigen): A namesake-themed Jigen Beast capable of turning people into what they hate most. Due to a combination of her lacking the monstrous true form that official cute Sentai monsters have and unknowingly exploiting Akiba Red's robot girl fetish, Yuru-Chara Jigen overpowers the Akibarangers until Super Akiba Red puts on a blindfold before killing her. Yuru-Chara Jigen is voiced by Haruko Momoi (桃井 はるこ, Momoi Haruko), who also appears as herself.
- Hadezukin (ハーデズキン, Hādezukin): A Space Ninja that General Tsuu created long ago and placed in storage before reviving her to exact revenge on Toei for altering Ninpuu Sentai Hurricaneger's original concept of having the Gouraigers appear as an evil Sentai group. Initially assuming the form of a cosplayer to eat otakus' "nerdy hearts", she takes on the identity of the yellow-colored Tento Raiger (テントライジャー, Tento Raijā) to draft the Gouraigers into the Ninchu Sentai Jakanger (忍虫戦隊ジャカンジャー, Ninchū Sentai Jakanjā) and alter reality to have ten days in the week, with the additional three serving to limit otaku and cosplayers' activities. After the Gouraigers remember their true identities, Hadezukin is killed by Akiba Red via the Hurricanegers' Inordinate Power. Hadezukin is voiced by Nao Nagasawa (長澤 奈央, Nagasawa Nao) while her human form is portrayed by Ami Tomite (冨手 麻妙, Tomite Ami).
- Mutoumushite (ムトウムシテ, Mutōmushite): A remodeled male version of Hadezukin and the Time Kenma (時の拳魔, Toki no Kenma) of the Rin Jūken Akugata that General Tsuu created to serve as his right-hand. While he is a master of the Rinjū Ladybug-Ken fighting style, Mutoumushite primarily uses his ability to replicate the fighting techniques of Super Sentai villains that stunt actor Yoshinori Okamoto portrayed. Upon learning of this, the Akibarangers exploit the former's secret desire for a glorious death by replicating the final battle between Change Dragon and Adjutant Buba before killing Mutoumushite with the Inordinate Bazooka. Mutoumushite is voiced by Nobuyuki Hiyama (檜山 修之, Hiyama Nobuyuki) while his human form is portrayed by Orakio Matsuyuki (松雪 オラキオ, Matsuyuki Orakio).
- Coelacanth Kans (シーラカンスカンス, Shīrakansu Kansu): A Mecha Gigan that destroys Itashar Robo before it is destroyed in turn by Itashar Boy.

==== Other members ====
- Akina Maihama (舞浜 亜希奈, Maihama Akina): An aspiring idol, General Tsuu's apprentice, and Luna's rival. Under General Tsuu's guidance, Akina lands a role in George Spielburton's latest film by using Queen Hedrian's "dance of greed". However, the movie project is canceled after Spielburton has a Sentai-themed dream and returns to the U.S. to create a new story. Despite this, Akina develops a rivalry with Luna. Akina Maihama is portrayed by Sakina Kuwae (桑江 咲菜, Kuwae Sakina).
- Imaginary Sentai Villains: Delusion World versions of past Sentai villains who appear in General Tsuu's delusions and are able to combine into the Darkness Inordinate Cannon (暗黒ダイソレタキャノン, Ankoku Daisoreta Kyanon) for Malseena's use.
  - Long (ロン, Ron): The "Infinite Dragon" and enemy of the Gekirangers.
  - Yaiba of Darkness (闇のヤイバ, Yami no Yaiba): A ninja of the Dark Shadow clan and enemy of the Boukengers.
  - Phantom Spy Vancuria (妖幻密使バンキュリア, Yōgen Misshi Bankyuria): A spy for the Infershia Empire, self-proclaimed "queen of the vampires", and enemy of the Magirangers.

== Guest characters ==
- Tazuko (たづ子): Nobuo Akagi's boss at Sasaki Pom Poko Delivery who often whacks him with her clipboard and tortures him with various wrestling holds for slacking off. Tazuko is portrayed by professional wrestler Yuki Ueda (植田 ゆう希, Ueda Yūki).
- Sayaka Honiden (本位田 さやか, Hon'iden Sayaka): An office worker at Nine Watt Publishing (ナインワット出版, Nain Watto Shuppan) and Akagi's love interest. In Season Tsuu, Sayaka is stated to have moved to Bhutan to work with her uncle. Sayaka Honiden is portrayed by Miiko Morita (森田 美位子, Morita Miiko).
- KozuKozu Mita (三田 こずこず, Mita Kozukozu): A clumsy maid at Himitsukichi and Hiroyo's assistant who dresses up as past Sentai characters to entertain customers and, in Season Tsuu, conducts research into reality changes for the Akibarangers. KozuKozu Mita is portrayed by Kozue Aikawa (愛川 こずえ, Aikawa Kozue).
- Ryuji Sainei (載寧 龍二, Sainei Ryūji): The actor who portrays Banban Akaza (赤座 伴番, Akaza Banban), a.k.a. Deka Red, in Tokusou Sentai Dekaranger. Akagi encounters him while Sainei is heading to a news conference promoting the Japanese language dub of Power Rangers S.P.D., in which he voices his character's American counterpart Jack Landors. Ryuji Sainei is portrayed by himself.
- Imaginary Sentai Warriors: Delusion World versions of past Sentai warriors who appear in the Akibarangers' delusions to assist them in battle and give them their respective team's Inordinate Power. For Season Tsuu, the male warriors are voiced by Tomokazu Seki (関 智一, Seki Tomokazu) and Takeshi Kusao (草尾 毅, Kusao Takeshi), while the female warriors are voiced by Akiko Nakagawa (中川 亜紀子, Nakagawa Akiko) except where indicated.
  - Deka Red (デカレッド, Deka Reddo): The field leader of the 28th Super Sentai, the Dekarangers. In season one episode two, Hiroyo hires a suit actor to pretend to be Deka Red to convince Akagi to stay on as Akiba Red. While fighting Shibuya Kōzorinahigenagaaburamushi, Akagi receives help from a Delusion World version of Deka Red, who gives him the Dekarangers' Inordinate Power. In Season Tsuu episode one, Deka Red leads his team in aiding the Akibarangers in their battle against Delu Knight and his forces. In season one, Deka Red is voiced by Ryuji Sainei, reprising his role from Tokusou Sentai Dekaranger.
  - Bouken Red (ボウケンレッド, Bōken Reddo): The leader of the 30th Super Sentai, the Boukengers. In season one episode three, during the Akibarangers' initial battle with Kabukichō Mesugurohyōmonchō, a drunken Akiba Red initially summons Bouken Red "Good Luck Form" to aid them. During their final battle with the Chief Clerk, Bouken Red returns in his regular form to give Mitsuki Aoyagi his team's Inordinate Power. In Season Tsuu episode one, Bouken Red leads his team in aiding the Akibarangers in their battle against Delu Knight and his forces. In season one, Bouken Red is voiced by Mitsuomi Takahashi (高橋 光臣, Takahashi Mitsuomi), who reprises the role from GoGo Sentai Boukenger.
  - Red Hawk (レッドホーク, Reddo Hōku): The leader of the 15th Super Sentai, the Jetmen. In season one episode six, following an encounter with Red Hawk's suit actor, Kazuo Niibori, a Delusion World version of Red Hawk appears during the Akibarangers' battle with Shimokitazawa Hoya to give them his team's Inordinate Power. In Season Tsuu episode one, Red Hawk leads his team in aiding the Akibarangers in their battle against Delu Knight and his forces.
  - Ryu Ranger (リュウレンジャー, Ryū Renjā): The leader of the 17th Super Sentai, the Dairangers. Due to Chief Editor HVD replacing the Dairangers with the Akibarangers as the 17th Super Sentai, Ryu Ranger was turned into China Red (チャイナレッド, Chaina Reddo), leader of the mascot team Chūka Sentai Chinaman (中華戦隊チャイナマン, Chūka Sentai Chainaman; lit. "Chinese Sentai Chinaman"). After the Akibarangers restore the Dairangers' place in the Super Sentai franchise, Ryu Ranger and the similarly restored Kiba Ranger give the Akibarangers their team's Inordinate Power. Ryu Ranger is voiced by Keiichi Wada (和田 圭市, Wada Keiichi), who reprises his role from Gosei Sentai Dairanger.
  - Kiba Ranger (キバレンジャー, Kiba Renjā): The sixth member of the Dairangers. Due to Chief Editor HVD replacing the Dairangers with the Akibarangers as the 17th Super Sentai, Kiba Ranger was turned into the latter group's obscure fourth member who was meant to appear before Gosei Sentai Akibaranger was cancelled. In the present, the altered Kiba Ranger seeks revenge on the Akibarangers until the former restore the Dairangers' place in the Super Sentai franchise, allowing the restored Kiba Ranger and Ryu Ranger to give the Akibarangers their team's Inordinate Power. Kiba Ranger is voiced by Wataru Abe (阿部 渡, Abe Wataru), who reprises his role from Gosei Sentai Dairanger.
  - Tyranno Ranger (ティラノレンジャー, Tirano Renjā) and Dragon Ranger (ドラゴンレンジャー, Doragon Renjā): A pair of brothers and the leader and sixth member of the 16th Super Sentai, the Zyurangers, respectively. Due to Kunimasmaphogany changing reality so that the Super Sentai franchise originated from an American franchise called "Powerful Rangers" (パワフルレンジャー, Pawafuru Renjā) instead of the other way around, Americanized versions of Tyranno Ranger and Dragon Ranger join forces with him and Malseena to Americanize the Akibarangers until Akiba Red uses the show-accurate sound effects of a Zyusouken toy to help the brothers remember who they are. With their memories restored, the Zyurangers give the Akibarangers their team's Inordinate Power so they can undo Kunimasmaphogany's changes. Tyranno Ranger and Dragon Ranger are voiced by Tomokazu Seki and Takeshi Kusao, respectively.
  - Ninpuu Sentai Hurricaneger (忍風戦隊ハリケンジャー, Ninpū Sentai Harikenjā): The eponymous 26th Super Sentai consisting of Air Ninja Hurricane Red (空忍ハリケンレッド, Soranin Hariken Reddo), Water Ninja Hurricane Blue (水忍ハリケンブルー, Mizunin Hariken Burū), and Land Ninja Hurricane Yellow (陸忍ハリケンイエロー, Okanin Hariken Ierō). After aiding the Akibarangers in restoring the Gouraigers, the Hurricanegers give them their Inordinate Power. The Hurricanegers are voiced by Tomokazu Seki, Akiko Nakagawa, and Takeshi Kusao, respectively.
    - Lightning Speed Gouraiger (電光石火ゴウライジャー, Denkōsekka Gōraijā): A pair of brothers consisting of Horned Ninja Kabuto Raiger (角忍カブトライジャー, Tsunonin Kabuto Raijā) and Fanged Ninja Kuwaga Raiger (牙忍クワガライジャー, Kibanin Kuwaga Raijā) who initially fought the Hurricanegers before joining forces with them to fight the Jakanja space ninja clan. Due to Hadezukin's reality changes, the Gouraigers are drafted into her Jakanger group until they are reminded of their time as construction workers and entrust the Akibarangers with the Hurricanegers' Inordinate power. The Gouraigers are voiced by Tomokazu Seki and Takeshi Kusao, respectively.
  - Yellow Four I (初代イエローフォー, Shodai Ierō Fō), Time Fire (タイムファイヤー, Taimufaiyā), and Abare Killer (アバレキラー, Abare Kirā): Three dead Sentai warriors from Choudenshi Bioman, Mirai Sentai Timeranger, and Bakuryū Sentai Abaranger respectively, who appear before the deceased Akagi, Yumeria, and Luna at Himitsukichi to take them to the afterlife. Yellow Four I is voiced by Akiko Nakagawa while Time Fire and Abare Killer are silent.
- Masako Yamada (山田 雅子, Yamada Masako): Yumeria Moegi's cosplayer mother who died in a car accident five years prior to the series. As a result, Yumeria constantly thinks of her mother on her birthday, resulting in the Akibarangers joining forces with a Delusion World version of Masako to fight Kabukichō Mesugurohyōmonchō, during which Masako temporarily becomes Akiba Yellow. Masako Yamada is portrayed by Rica Matsumoto (松本 梨香, Matsumoto Rika).
- Kazuo Niibori (新堀 和男, Niibori Kazuo): A suit actor who portrayed Red Hawk in Chōjin Sentai Jetman, among other Red Sentai warriors throughout the Super Sentai franchise. The Akibarangers meet him when Akagi is tasked with delivering a package to Toei's studios, where Niibori helps Aoyagi become a better Akibaranger by teaching her various suit actor tactics under the mistaken belief that she had been hired by Toei to become a suit actor for the next Super Sentai series' blue warrior. Kazuo Niibori is portrayed by himself.
- Ikura (いとくとら, Ikura): A part-time maid at Himitsukichi who often gets into play-fights with KozuKozu. Ikura is portrayed by the Danceroid member of the same name.
- Haruko Momoi (桃井 はるこ, Momoi Haruko): An anime singer who is among the people attacked by Asakusa Alpaca. Haruko Momoi is portrayed by herself in addition to voicing Yuru-Chara Jigen.
- Takuma Tsuzuki (都築 タクマ, Tsuzuki Takuma): An Interpol agent and Hiroyo's younger half-brother who becomes New Akiba Red (新アキバレッド, Shin Akiba Reddo) after Akagi is recruited by the Pentagon until the latter realizes their reality is part of a TV series undergoing a mid-season change, causing Tsuzuki to leave the Akibarangers and return to Interpol. As New Akiba Red, Tsuzuki can perform the Surge Mice (サージマイス, Sāji Maisu) and Surge Jaguar (サージジャガー, Sāji Jagā) attacks. Takuma Tsuzuki is portrayed by Shinpei Takagi (高木 心平, Takagi Shinpei).
- Drill Cyclops (ドリルサイクロプス, Doriru Saikuropusu): The first in a line of Mosoborgs (モウソボーグ, Mōsobōgu; lit. "Delusion Borg") intended for use by the Delusion Empire who is equipped with drill arms and a drill horn on his head. He is sent to destroy Tokyo's lifeline to drown the city in chaos, but is destroyed by the Akibarangers' Heart-Technique-Body Attack. In Season Tsuu, Drill Cyclops is retconned into being the Stema Otsu Corporation's giant Darkness Stema Castle Robo (暗黒ステマ城ロボ, Ankoku Sutema-jō Robo) piloted by Malseena, which is destroyed by Itashar Robo.
- Mio Usagi (宇佐木 美緒, Usagi Mio): A character from Salvage Mice and Mitsuki's martial arts rival. The Akibarangers seek her out in the hopes of extending their show, only to learn Usagi was injured in a bicycle accident and has to recover for three months. Mio Usagi is portrayed by Julia Nagano (長野 じゅりあ, Nagano Juria).
- Yasuko Yokoyama (横山 靖子, Yokoyama Yasuko): Yumeria's mother-in-law who is secretly an anime otaku and previously worked as an anime singer under the stage name Etsuko Horimi (堀美 江都子, Horimi Etsuko). Though she initially forbids Yumeria's otaku quirks, believing it would tarnish the Yokoyama name, Yasuko eventually relents and reconciles with her daughter-in-law. Yasuko Yokoyama is portrayed by Mitsuko Horie (堀江 美都子, Horie Mitsuko).
- George Spielburton (ジョージ・スピルバートン, Jōji Supirubāton): (Note: He is named after George Lucas, Steven Spielberg, and Tim Burton.) An American film director and fan of Super Sentai known for only choosing actors who are also Super Sentai fans regardless of how they perform. George Spielburton is portrayed by Koichi Sakamoto (坂本 浩一, Sakamoto Kōichi).
- Choko Nagakawa (永川 蝶子, Nagakawa Chōko): (Note: Her name is a play on real-life idol Shoko Nakagawa (中川 翔子, Nakagawa Shōko).) A popular Akihabara idol nicknamed Choco-tan (ちょこたん, Chokotan). The Akibarangers unconsciously summon a Delusion World version dressed in a costume inspired by Big One from J.A.K.Q. Dengekitai to assist them in their battle against Yuru-Chara Jigen, only for the monster to turn her into okra before she is restored following Yuru-Chara Jigen's defeat. Choko Nagakawa is portrayed by Moe Wakaki (若木 萌, Wakaki Moe).
- Nobuo Tanaka (田中 信夫, Tanaka Nobuo): The narrator of Himitsu Sentai Gorenger's first 14 episodes, Dengeki Sentai Changeman, Kousoku Sentai Turboranger, and Chouriki Sentai Ohranger. Hiroyo hires him to help the Akibarangers in their fight against Yuru-Chara Jigen. Nobuo Tanaka is portrayed by himself.
- Yoshinori Okamoto (岡本 美登, Okamoto Yoshinori): A veteran suit actor known for portraying various Super Sentai villains. After the Akibarangers mistake him for General Tsuu, they learn the latter hired him as a motion capture study for Mutoumushite and was overshadowed by Kazuo Niibori, which Okamoto made up for by giving each of his characters a glorious death. Yoshinori Okamoto is portrayed by himself.
- Seiji Takaiwa (高岩 成二, Takaiwa Seiji): A veteran suit actor who portrayed various Sentai warriors during the 1990s and 2000s. Seiji Takaiwa is portrayed by himself.
- Prism Ace (プリズムA（エース）, Purizumu Ēsu): An alien giant, parody of the Kyodai Hero genre, and the eponymous character of the fictional TV series Unofficial Giant Prism Ace (非公認巨神プリズムA（エース）, Hikōnin Kyojin Purizumu Ēsu), which is produced by Toei's fictional rival Chigauyo Productions (チガウヨープロダクション, Chigauyō Purodakushon; lit. "That's Not True Productions"), who used a spy to trick Saburo Hatte into giving them the Super Sentai franchise's time slot and turn Hiroyo into Prism Ace's little sister capable of empowering him with her forehead crystal. With Saburo and Malseena's help, the Akibarangers enlarge Super Akiba Red to confront Prism Ace, who initially overpowers him until Super Akiba Red uses the trope of tokusatsu heroes using their finishers on the right side of the screen to defeat him and restore the Super Sentai franchise. Prism Ace is voiced by Tōru Furuya (古谷 徹, Furuya Tōru).
