= Ikura (disambiguation) =

Ikura may refer to:

== People ==
- Lilas Ikuta (幾田 りら; born 2000), Japanese singer and songwriter also known as Ikura
- Kazue Ikura (伊倉 一恵; born 1959), Japanese actress
- Ikura Kushida (櫛田 育良; born 2007), Japanese figure skater
- Ikura, leader of the Danceroid group

== Other ==
- Ikura (いとくとら), unofficial Sentai Akibaranger character
- Ikura Station, train station in Japan
- Salmon caviar, also known by the Japanese name Ikura

== See also ==
- Ikuradon
- Ikurangi
