= Miiko =

- Gender: Female

Origin
- Origin: Japanese
- Meaning: Different meanings depending on the kanji used

Miiko (written: 美以子 or 美位子) is a feminine Japanese given name. Notable people with the name include:

- Miiko Morita (森田 美位子; born 1987), Japanese gravure idol and actress
- Miiko Taka (高 美以子; 1925–2023), Japanese American actress

== Other people ==
- Miiko Albornoz (born 1990), Swedish footballer
- Miiko Hintz (born 1992), Finnish ice hockey player
