= Science Fell in Love, So I Tried to Prove It =

Japanese manga series

- First tankōbon volume cover

理系が恋に落ちたので証明してみた。 (Rikei ga Koi ni Ochita no de Shōmei Shite Mita.)
- Genre: Romantic comedy
- Manga
- Written by: Alifred Yamamoto
- Published by: Flex Comix
- Magazine: Comic Meteor
- Original run: 2016 – present
- Volumes: 21
- Television drama
- Directed by: Masatsugu Asahi
- Written by: Shūji Kō
- Music by: Akiyoshi Yasuda
- Original run: September 1, 2018 – September 22, 2018
- Episodes: 4
- Live-action film
- Directed by: Masatsugu Asahi; Toshihiro Sato
- Written by: Shūji Kō; Hidehiro Itō
- Music by: Eiyū Kojima; Ryō Miyage
- Released: February 1, 2019
- Anime television series
- Directed by: Tōru Kitahata
- Written by: Rintarō Ikeda; Michiko Yokote
- Music by: hisakuni; Shōichirō Hirata; Kaoru Ōtsuka; Shūhei Takahashi; Takuma Sogi; Yūko Takahashi
- Studio: Zero-G
- Licensed by: Crunchyroll; NA: Sentai Filmworks (home video)
- Original network: Tokyo MX, BS11, RNC, GTV, GYT, MBS, CTC
- Original run: January 11, 2020 – March 28, 2020
- Episodes: 12
- Anime television series

Science Fell in Love, So I Tried to Prove It r=1-sinθ (Heart)
- Directed by: Tōru Kitahata
- Written by: Rintarō Ikeda; Michiko Yokote
- Music by: hisakuni; Shōichirō Hirata; Kaoru Ōtsuka; Shūhei Takahashi; Takuma Sogi; Yūko Takahashi
- Studio: Zero-G
- Licensed by: Crunchyroll
- Original network: Tokyo MX, BS NTV, SUN, GTV, BS Fuji, AT-X, UHB, GYT, KTN
- Original run: April 2, 2022 – June 18, 2022
- Episodes: 12
- icon

Science Fell in Love, So I Tried to Prove It (理系が恋に落ちたので証明してみた。, Rikei ga Koi ni Ochita no de Shōmei Shite Mita.) is a Japanese romantic comedy manga series by Alifred Yamamoto. It has been serialized online via Flex Comix's Comic Meteor website since 2016 and has been collected in twenty-one tankōbon volumes. A four-episode live-action drama adaptation aired from September 1 to September 22, 2018, and a live-action film adaptation premiered on February 1, 2019. An anime television series adaptation by Zero-G aired from January to March 2020. A second season aired from April to June 2022. A stage play adaptation of the series was performed in December 2024.

== Premise ==
Saitama University researchers Shinya Yukimura and Ayame Himuro use data science to analyze the world's systems. But when Ayame confesses to Shinya that she might be in love with him, they both agree that they need to approach the issue with scientific experiments including measuring their heart rates under various situations. Their quirky coworkers in their research group also join in on the fun.

== Characters ==
Shinya Yukimura (雪村心夜, Yukimura Shinya)
Portrayed by: Shun Nishime (live-action TV series and film), Shuta Urano (stage play)
Voiced by: Yuma Uchida (Japanese); Billy Kametz (English) (season 1), Alejandro Saab (season 2) (anime)
Yukimura is a first-year graduate student who loves to analyze everything scientifically. He likes Himuro but is overcome by awkwardness whenever anything the situation gets intimate.
Ayame Himuro (氷室菖蒲, Himuro Ayame)
Portrayed by: Nana Asakawa (live-action TV series and film), Yurie Kozakai (stage play)
Voiced by: Sora Amamiya (Japanese); Avrielle Corti (English) (anime)
Ayame Himuro is a first-year graduate student who is as obsessed with science as Yukimura. She has long and light purple hair in the anime series. She is the one who initially confesses to Yukimura. Both of them are in the same wavelength when it comes to science, but when it is explicitly romance, Himuro is shown to be more aware of the moment. Her ponytail sometimes sways like a dog's tail when she is happy.
Kotonoha Kanade (奏言葉, Kanade Kotonoha)
Portrayed by: Yuuka Yano (live-action TV series and film), Nao Furuhata (stage play)
Voiced by: Natsuko Hara (Japanese); Renee Dorian (English) (anime)
Kanade is a fourth-year undergraduate student in the Ikeda lab group, and Yukimura and Himuro's junior. She fell in love with science because of her encouraging interactions with her high school math teacher, and also likes that her group is balanced between men and women. Being the straight girl in the group, she gets impatient that Himuro and Yukimura are not pursuing each other like a normal couple and are making that process way more complicated than it should be. She herself longs for a normal romance.
Ena Ibarada (棘田恵那, Ibarada Ena)
Portrayed by: Karin Ogino (live-action TV series and film), Mayu Yashiro (stage play)
Voiced by: Nichika Ōmori (Japanese); Erika Harlacher (English) (anime)
Ibarada is a second-year graduate student and the most senior of the students in Ikeda lab. She is petite and has long lavender hair in the anime series. She likes to occasionally tease her juniors, especially her childhood friend Kosuke. She spends much of her time playing handheld video games and often naps on the lab's couch.
Kosuke Inukai (犬飼虎輔, Inukai Kōsuke)
Portrayed by: Tomu Fujita (live-action TV series and film), Masato Saki (stage play)
Voiced by: Jun Fukushima (anime) (Japanese); Jeff Schine (English)
Kosuke is a fourth-year undergraduate student with blond hair. He seems to be an easy-going ladies' man on the outside, bragging about his long-term relationship with a girl named Aika, but it is soon revealed he is actually a hardcore otaku and that Aika is a dating sim character which he has merch including figurines and dakimakura (body pillows). He and Ibarada are childhood friends who share interests like video gaming.
Professor Ikeda (池田教授, Ikeda-kyōju)
Portrayed by: Ryōtarō Okiayu (live-action TV series and film), Ren Yagami (stage play)
Voiced by: Ryōtarō Okiayu (Japanese); Aaron LaPlante (English) (anime)
Professor Ikeda Kashin is the supervisor of the lab. He is usually calm but can be intimidating sometimes. He has a muscular build and isn't afraid to crush pens in his hands when he gets emotional. He is also married.
Rikekuma (リケクマ)
Voiced by: Momo Asakura (Note: Asakura reprised this voice role in the stage play.) (Japanese); Tara Sands (English) (anime)
A bear mascot who explains certain complicated science details for the audience.
Arika Yamamoto (山本亜梨華, Yamamoto Arika)
Portrayed by: Riko Tanaka (stage play)
Voiced by: Yui Ogura (Japanese); Cherami Leigh (English)
Professor Ikeda's former student and an alumna of his lab. She aspires to be a professional manga artist and wants to use Yukimura and Himuro's relationship as reference material, even if it means sabotaging their relationship at times.
Suiu Fujiwara (藤原翠雨, Fujiwara Suiu)
Portrayed by: Yū Doi (stage play)
Voiced by: Marina Yamada
A graduate student in biology at the university. Her studies include research into aphrodisiacs. Her flirtatious personality is in contrast to that of her long-time boyfriend Chris.
Chris Florette (クリス・フロレット, Kurisu Furoretto)
Portrayed by: Daichi Imae (stage play)
Voiced by: Yuki Kaji (Japanese); Chris Hackney (English)
A graduate student in biology who works in the same lab as his long-time girlfriend Fujiwara. The love between them is remarkably strong, often leaving Himuro and Yukimura questioning their own relationship.
Haru Kagurano (神楽野春, Kagurano Haru)
Portrayed by: Kiara Satō (stage play)
Voiced by: Rena Hasegawa (Japanese); Erin Yvette (English)
A high school student and daughter of a professor at the university. Her father's relentless belittling leads her to believe she's an idiot, but when Yukimura begins to tutor her part-time, she comes to realize her true potential.

== Media ==
=== Manga ===
The manga has been serialized online via Flex Comix Comic Meteor website since 2016 and has been collected in twenty-one tankōbon volumes as of November 2026.

No.	Japanese release date	Japanese ISBN
1	March 13, 2018	978-4-86-675923-4
2	March 13, 2018	978-4-86-675933-3
3	March 13, 2018	978-4-86-675943-2
4	July 11, 2018	978-4-86-675018-7
5	January 10, 2019	978-4-86-675043-9
6	July 11, 2019	978-4-86-675068-2
7	January 9, 2020	978-4-86-675090-3
8	March 11, 2020	978-4-86-675096-5
9	October 21, 2020	978-4-86-675122-1
10	July 12, 2021	978-4-86-675156-6
11	January 12, 2022	978-4-86-675188-7
12	April 12, 2022	978-4-86-675208-2
13	June 10, 2022	978-4-86-675222-8
14	February 10, 2023	978-4-86-675269-3
15	June 12, 2023	978-4-86-675294-5
16	December 12, 2023	978-4-86-675325-6
17	July 12, 2024	978-4-86-675363-8
18	February 12, 2025	978-4-86-675409-3
19	August 8, 2025	978-4-86-675450-5
20	March 13, 2026	978-4-86-675492-5
21	November 13, 2026	978-4-86-675535-9

=== TV drama ===
A 4-episode live-action drama adaptation aired from September 1 to September 22, 2018, to promote the live-action film. The drama was directed by Masatsugu Asahi.

=== Live-action film ===
A live-action film adaptation premiered on February 1, 2019. The film was directed by Masatsugu Asahi and Toshihiro Sato.

=== Anime ===
An anime television series adaptation was announced on January 8, 2019. The series was animated by Zero-G and directed by Tōru Kitahata, with Rintarō Ikeda credited for series composition. Ikeda and Michiko Yokote wrote the scripts, and Yūsuke Isouchi designed the characters. Hisakuni, Shouichiro Hirata, Kaoru Ōtsuka, Shūhei Takahashi, Takuma Sogi, and Yūko Takahashi composed the music. It aired from January 11, 2020, to March 28, 2020, on Tokyo MX, BS11, AT-X and UHB. Sora Amamiya (who voices Ayame Himuro) performed the series' opening theme song "PARADOX", while Akari Nanawo performed the series' ending theme song "Turing Love" with utaite Sou as guest vocals. Amazon Prime Video Japan released all 12 episodes of the series on January 11, 2020 JST. Crunchyroll simulcast the series with subtitles as well and has also released an English dub.

On October 17, 2020, a second season was announced during a special event held in Japan. Titled Science Fell in Love, So I Tried to Prove It r=1-sinθ (Heart), (Note: Japanese: 理系が恋に落ちたので証明してみた。r=1-sinθ（ハート）, Hepburn: Rikei ga Koi ni Ochita no de Shōmei Shite Mita. Hāto) it aired from April 2 to June 18, 2022, with the cast and staff reprising their roles. (Note: Tokyo MX lists the series premiere at 25:30 on April 1, 2022, which is effectively 1:30 a.m. JST on April 2.) Sora Amamiya performed the opening theme song "Love-Evidence", while CHiCO with HoneyWorks and Mafumafu performed the ending theme song "Bibitto Love".

On May 18, 2021, it was announced Sentai Filmworks picked up the home video rights.

==== Episodes ====
===== Season 1 =====
No. overall	No. in season	Title	Directed by	Written by	Storyboarded by	Original release date (Note: All episodes were released on Amazon Prime Video Japan on January 11, 2020 JST.)
1	1	"Science-types Fell in Love, So They Tried to Analyze It."; Transliteration: "Rikei ga Koi ni Ochita no de Kaiseki Shite Mita." (Japanese: 理系が恋に落ちたので解析してみた。)	Kenta Ōnishi	Rintarō Ikeda	Tōru Kitahata	January 11, 2020 (Note: This episode was pre-screened on December 8, 2019.)
Shinya Yukimura and Ayame Himuro are brilliant students at Saitama University. Himuro suddenly confesses she is in love with Yukimura who, unsure how to respond, asks how to define love. Himuro presents mathematical evidence, such as the number of minutes she spends staring at him and her increases in heart rate. Their conclusion is that love is based on a mathematical formula. Fellow student, Kanade Kotonoha, worries they have gone mad. They begin replicating a romantic manga scene in which Yukimura traps Himuro against a wall while tracking her heart rate and determine that physical closeness has the most extreme result. Yukimura worries they are confusing love for illness. They repeat their experiment 100 times but find the trap move becomes less effective over time. Himuro compares Yukimura's trap move to a Sumo palm thrust, which is not romantic. Kotonoha insists love is based on emotions and presents a story of falling in love with her high school teacher as evidence, but is foiled when Yukimura breaks the story down into a mathematical formula and demands details of her romantic history. Himuro punishes him for being too demanding so he repeats the trap move once more, insisting he will mathematically prove love exists, causing her heart rate to rise again.
2	2	"Science-types Fell in Love, So They Tried Experiments."; Transliteration: "Rikei ga Koi ni Ochita no de Jikken Shite Mita." (Japanese: 理系が恋に落ちたので実験してみた。)	Atsuko Tonomizu	Rintarō Ikeda	Kenta Ōnishi	January 18, 2020
Kotonoha explains they work in Information science researching Human, Social and Natural science and attempting to explain those using mathematics. Unfortunately their advisor, Ena Ibarada, never does research and plays games all day. It is Yukimura's turn to have his heart rate measured but he tries to flee before embarrassing data can be collected, so Kotonoha and Himuro tie him up. After stroking Himuro's hair Yukimura's heart rate rises significantly. Ibarada suggests repeating the test with someone other than Himuro. When his heart rate also rises for Kotonoha and Ibarada, Himuro thinks he is a pervert, until Yukimura explains his heart rate rises because women make him nervous. Himuro gets mad at him anyway. Kotonoha struggles to come up with a theme for her thesis. She sees Himuro and Yukimura trying to cook a meal to find if love makes food tastier, using a variety of complicated tests. Kotonoha suggests a blind taste test, one dish Himuro cooks with love, and a generic dish. However Himuro ruins the experiment by drawing a love note on hers. Yukimura claims her dish is tastiest because the note itself contains love, but no conclusions are reached because everybody becomes too embarrassed. Kotonoha returns to her thesis and finds the whole time Himuro and Yukimura were actually cooking a meal for her as she had nothing for lunch. She finds it is delicious.
3	3	"Science-types Fell in Love, So They Try Planning a Date."; Transliteration: "Rikei ga Koi ni Ochita no de Dēto no Keikaku o Tatete Mita." (Japanese: 理系が恋に落ちたのでデートの計画を立ててみた。)	Shin'ichirō Ueda	Michiko Yokote	Shin'ichirō Ueda	January 25, 2020
Yukimura and Himuro decide to interview someone who is in love. Fellow student, Kosuke Inukai, claims to have a girlfriend, Aika, whom he has spent 227,000 yen on and holds every night. Himuro panics as she has only spent 728 yen on Yukimura and held him once during an experiment. Ibarada, Kosuke's childhood friend, reveals Aika is a dating sim character he owns a body pillow of. Yukimura concludes this to be normal as human romantic preferences are diverse. Based on Kosuke's data Himuro concludes she must not love Yukimura. Yukimura panics and retracts his earlier conclusion, deeming Kosuke too weird to gather normal data from. Himuro reveals to Kotonoha she was bullied as a child, until she met a boy who was also bullied but never let it bother him. He told her if she dressed nicer and stopped looking gloomy people would automatically treat her better, influencing the way she dresses in the present. Kotonoha realises the boy was obviously Yukimura, only neither Yukimura nor Himuro have realised it. Fed up with how dense they both are Kotonoha demands they go on a normal date. Deciding to visit an amusement park they immediately plan the most efficient route to experience the 22 most romantic moments of a date at an amusement park, following which Kotonoha forces Yukimura to officially ask Himuro on the date, which makes her extremely happy when he does.
4	4	"Science-types Fell in Love, So They Tried Going on a Date."; Transliteration: "Rikei ga Koi ni Ochita no de Dēto Shite Mita." (Japanese: 理系が恋に落ちたのでデートしてみた。)	Kaoru Suzuki	Michiko Yokote	Yoshihiro Takamoto	February 1, 2020
Himuro and Yukimura turn up to their date in their lab coats ready to follow their date plan but Kanade forces them to dress casually. As well as heart rate and temperature Ibarada suggests counting the times they feel happy, uncertain, scared, and even when they want to snuggle. Kotonoha has trouble keeping Himuro and Yukimura focused on the date instead of collecting data. Yukimura opts out of the hand holding, making Himuro leave, until a delinquent tries to forcefully ask her out, so she baffles him with a complicated scientific rejection. Annoyed he grabs her arm so Yukimura comes to her rescue. When the delinquent protests Yukimura also baffles him by angrily showing evidence that suggests he is attracted to Himuro yet somehow does not prove he loves her. Yukimura's emotional outburst embarrasses him, while Himuro finds it extremely attractive, and they end up leaving while holding hands. At the amusement park they continue to hold hands but keep getting distracted by scientifically analysing the physics of the rides, mostly to distract themselves from being scared of the rides. On the Ferris Wheel, Yukimura breaks from the plan and gives Himuro earrings. Himuro studies their data and determines they had fun but should repeat the experiment to make sure.
5	5	"Science-types Fell in Love, So They Tried Holding a Meeting."; Transliteration: "Rikei ga Koi ni Ochita no de Kaigi Shite Mita." (Japanese: 理系が恋に落ちたので会議してみた。)	Yasushi Muroya	Rintarō Ikeda	Yasushi Muroya	February 8, 2020
Yukimura and Himuro plan to present their data at the labs bi-monthly meeting with their professor, Ikeda Kashin, who is both easy going, but terrifying once angered. He announces a joint training camp with three other universities which Kanade and Kosuke will need to attend to present their suggested thesis topics, which Kosuke has not started yet, earning Ikeda's wrath. Ikeda is further confused when Yukimura and Himuro present their data on love, which they mostly use to embarrass each other. Despite being annoyed that they are spending less time on their scientific research Ikeda decides their love research is more interesting and could even become a valuable research study on the psychology of love. They decide they require a larger body of volunteer romantic couples to observe repeating all their experiments. Ibarada pairs Kosuke with Yukimura for her own amusement so Kosuke challenges her to repeat a hugging experiment with him and see who is most affected. Himuro pairs Yukimura with Kanade but sabotages the experiment due to jealousy. Ibarada easily wins the contest with Kosuke by imitating Aika which makes his heart race, then beats him again by recounting memories of their childhood friendship. While studying data of Kosuke's heart rate Ibarada suggests Yukimura and Himuro should try a kiss.
6	6	"Science-types Fell in Love, So They Tried Kissing."; Transliteration: "Rikei ga Koi ni Ochita no de Kisu Shite Mita." (Japanese: 理系が恋に落ちたのでキスしてみた。)	Hitoyuki Matsui	Michiko Yokote	Hiroshi Matsuzono	February 15, 2020
Plans are made for a kiss experiment, but Himuro is not enthusiastic about their first kiss being an experiment. Kanade agrees that a kiss needs to be when the mood is right. Himuro and Yukimura begin designing an experiment with help from Ibarada and Kotonoha, and questionable help from Kosuke. They determine they need a pleasant, quiet place with low lighting, no other people and 30 seconds of eye contact. After much research it is determined the best place is the university roof at sunset. As a control measure it is determined other kisses should take place first. Yukimura tries to kiss Kanade, but kisses her hand instead. Ibarada kisses Himuro, making Yukimura jealous. Kosuke kisses Himuro's hand but she feels nothing. Himuro has a sisterly moment with Kanade and kisses her on the forehead, embarrassing them both. Yukimura and Kosuke get in a fight. Yukimura runs away from Ibarada. Ibarada and Kosuke play games instead. Kosuke and Kanade have an indirect kiss via a teacup. Finally Yukimura and Himuro try to kiss, finding that the mood is exactly right. Unfortunately they are interrupted by a helicopter, the sun setting before they are ready, and the janitor wanting to lock the roof door, ruining the mood. Annoyed Himuro demands they kiss anyway, regardless of mood. Yukimura kisses her hair, promising one day they will have a kiss of the highest theoretical value, which ends up being perfect in its own way.
7	7	"Science-types Fell in Love, So They Tried Having a Drinking Party."; Transliteration: "Rikei ga Koi ni Ochita no de Nomikai Shite Mita." (Japanese: 理系が恋に落ちたので飲み会してみた。)	Masaki Utsunomiya	Rintarō Ikeda	Akira Nishimori	February 22, 2020
The residents of the lab throw a party to celebrate the end of the semester and play their traditional party game where they recite prime numbers. Kanade has never studied prime numbers so Himuro explains their scientific significance, and even that one of mathematics greatest unsolved problems, the Riemann hypothesis, involves prime numbers. Himuro gets drunk and starts acting very clingy around Yukimura, while Kosuke strangely does the same with Ibarada. Ikeda drinks too much and falls asleep. Kanade also gets drunk and scolds Yukimura and Himuro for not becoming a normal couple already. She also admits an incident in high school lead to her trying her hardest to fit in and seem "normal". With only Yukimura left sober he reads a book while everyone sleeps. With the failure of the kiss experiment they decide to extract love data from fairy tales, such as Cinderella and The Tale of the Bamboo Cutter, despite Yukimura bemoaning their lack of realism. In the end they make no progress that day, but they decide that is not such a bad thing. In the post-credits, they do their take on the crane wife story.
8	8	"Science-types Fell in Love, So They Tried to Gather Evidence of Love."; Transliteration: "Rikei ga Koi ni Ochita no de Suki no Shōko o Atsumete Mita." (Japanese: 理系が恋に落ちたので好きの証拠を集めてみた。)	Atsuko Tonomizu	Michiko Yokote	Miyana Okita	February 29, 2020
With less than a month until the training camp Kosuke has gotten no further on his research and is hopelessly depressed. Ikeda suggests Kosuke find science in his everyday life, such as NP-hardness in complex datings sim, or Chaos theory in the random trajectory of a soccer ball. Yukimura criticises Kanade's presentation skills, citing the 10,000 hours rule, then demands a sample of her saliva. Himuro reveals they want to measure Oxytocin, aka the love hormone, that is released when in physical contact with a loved one. Their hope is that they can accurately identify who a person is in love with. As an example Yukimura shows the embarrassing video of Himuro drunk at the party, which Himuro did not know existed. They decide a 1 minute hug will suffice for physical contact, but both become overwhelmed after only a few seconds. Yukimura plans to present their oxytocin research at the training camp. Arika Yamamoto, an ex-student of Ikeda's, arrives at the lab and becomes interested in Himuro and Yukimura. She reveals she is an amateur manga artist and asks permission to turn them into a manga series. They agree, hoping they can collect love data from everyone who reads it. Ikeda invites Arika to the training camp, which he reveals is in Okinawa. When Arika becomes excited about all the erotic scenes she could draw of Himuro and Yukimura they begin to regret accepting her offer.
9	9	"Science-types Fell in Love, So They Tried Attending a Training Camp in Okinawa."; Transliteration: "Rikei ga Koi ni Ochita no de Okinawa Gasshuku Itte Mita." (Japanese: 理系が恋に落ちたので沖縄合宿行ってみた。)	Hisaya Takabayashi	Michiko Yokote	Hisaya Takabayashi	March 7, 2020
Yukimura is punished by Himuro for trying to conduct experiments on the plane. Kanade expresses interest in the physics of flight so Himuro explains about lift and Bernoulli's principle whilst struggling with her impulse to cuddle Yukimura. They find their hotel is unusually luxurious and learn Arika paid for it, despite being a Starving artist, in the hope luxury will cause Yukimura and Himuro to be romantic and provide material for her manga. On the beach Yukimura is embarrassed that Himuro is 2.34 times more attractive in a bikini. Yuuichi, the delinquent from the amusement park, is in Okinawa but flees after seeing Himuro. They play watermelon splitting but Kosuke is unable to follow Ibarada's Complex plane directions. Himuro and Yukimura begin physical contact experiments, but due to the amount of exposed skin are too embarrassed. Yukimura gets in an argument with the others about which type of hug offers the largest amount of skin contact. Due to Himuro's large bust creating distance between them, Ibarada and Arika try to force Yukimura to hug Kosuke instead to avoid the bust problem. Ibarada tortures Kosuke with their childhood beach memories. Yuuichi decides to seduce Ibarada, but when he grabs her arm Kosuke beats him up, only to learn they were playing games on their phones and Ibarada humiliates him for overreacting but is secretly glad he did. Ikeda reveals to Kanade and Kosuke their presentations will be in front of the world's most famous geniuses, scientists and professors.
10	10	"Science-types Fell in Love, So They Tried Giving Presentations."; Transliteration: "Rikei ga Koi ni Ochita no de Kenkyū Happyō Shite Mita." (Japanese: 理系が恋に落ちたので研究発表してみた。)	Masaki Utsunomiya	Rintarō Ikeda	Toshizō Kida	March 14, 2020
Yukimura barges into Himuro's room, making her believe he wants physical intimacy, only for him to begin preparing Kanade for her presentation. Himuro realizes she wants to be closer with Yukimura at times when it is impossible, in accordance with the Behavioural Reactance rule, and believes she is responding to their lack of intimacy by craving more. The first presentation is given by Shijikou Naoya, one of Yuuichi's friends, on Nash equilibrium, Non-cooperative game theory and the Tabu search principle, but he is kicked off stage by his own professor for failing to adequately prepare. Kosuke presents his research into NP-hardness and longest path and shortest path problems. Despite the erotic content Professor Kaku, a famous scientist, is forced to agree his research has value given the recent creation of National Gaming Championships. Kanade begins to panic, so Yukimura hugs her, which is seen by Himuro. Kanade becomes angry so Yukimura explains he was attempting to raise her Cortisol levels to calm her. She presents her thesis on the Travelling salesman problem and Latent variables using Yukimura and Himuro's perfect amusement park date as her basis. She manages to answer all the professors' questions and impresses them. Kosuke is even praised by Professor Kaku, despite having called him baldy. Angry, Himuro confronts Yukimura about his hug with Kanade.
11	11	"Science-types Fell in Love, So They Tried Having a Fight."; Transliteration: "Rikei ga Koi ni Ochita no de Kenka Shite Mita." (Japanese: 理系が恋に落ちたので喧嘩してみた。)	Shin'ichirō Ueda	Rintarō Ikeda	Akira Nishimori	March 21, 2020
Himuro becomes angry at Yukimura. Yukimura refuses to feel shame for helping Kanade calm down and berates Himuro for feeling jealous since they aren't even dating yet. Himuro slaps him and leaves crying. Everyone tries to relax at an aquarium but cannot due to Himuro and Yukimura. Himuro asks if Yukimura knows why she is upset, though Kosuke points out this is a legendary relationship question for which there is no right answer the man can give. Yukimura gives scientific reasons for her anger, including her menstrual cycle, so she hits him again. Himuro admits to Kanade she is ashamed for acting emotionally instead of intellectually, whereas Yukimura is disappointed because the aquarium would have been ideal for a high value kiss. Himuro tells Kanade she was most affected by the statement that she and Yukimura are not dating, so Kanade tells her some jealousy is expected when in love, but rather than talking to Yukimura about it, Himuro adds a Jealousy Frequency variable to their research, but cannot tell Yukimura since they are fighting. She decides to reconcile with him and with Kanade and Arika's help, decides to buy Yukimura a personalised glasses case and write an apology thesis. She runs to give it to him, but trips and breaks the case, causing her to run away in embarrassment. Yukimura reads the thesis and decides he must reconcile with Himuro.
12	12	"I Knew I Could Fall in Love with You, So I Tried to Prove it." Transliteration: "Kimi ni Koi ga Dekiru Koto o Shōmei Shite Mita." (Japanese: 君に恋ができる事を証明してみた。)	Tōru Kitahata	Rintarō Ikeda	Tōru Kitahata	March 28, 2020
Kanade becomes concerned when Himuro does not return to their room, so she heads to Yukimura, who is currently working on reconciling with Himuro. Learning that she is missing, he, along with Kosuke and Kanade, conduct a full search in the hotel for her. Amidst it, Ibarada informs them that she saw Himuro head outside the hotel and never returned, as well as that she had tripped on the last step of the staircase, meaning it was physically impossible for her to have broken the glasses case. After hearing from Kanade that Yamamoto was in charge of gift-wrapping, Yukimura confronts her outside, and she reveals she indeed broke the case, wanting to serve as an obstacle to their reconciliation to generate more drama and material for her manga. Yamamoto then compares herself to Yukimura: two wholly devoted individuals in their fields who will stop at nothing to see results. Yukimura agrees and swears to Yamamoto that he will stop her every attempt to obstruct their research to discover the existence of love. Yamamoto wishes him and Himuro well before revealing Himuro's location, as well as the glasses case she actually bought, the one that broke being a decoy. Yukimura runs off and locates Himuro on a bridge, where he begins criticizing her for her poorly written reconciliation thesis. In the middle of said criticizing, Himuro lets out her emotions and embraces Yukimura on the spot, leading to the two of them sharing a kiss overseeing the sunrise. The two of them regroup with everyone else and they all return to the university, where they continue their research on love.

===== Season 2: r=1-sinθ (Heart) =====
No. overall	No. in season	Title	Directed by (Note: Information is taken from the ending credits of each episode.)	Written by	Storyboarded by	Original release date
13	1	"Science-types Fell in Love, So They Tried Comparing Couples."; Transliteration: "Rikei ga Koi ni Ochita no de Kappuru to Hikaku Shite Mita." (Japanese: 理系が恋に落ちたのでカップルと比較してみた。)	Tōru Kitahata	Rintarō Ikeda	Tōru Kitahata	April 2, 2022
To continue their research into Oxytocin in saliva, Ibarada sends Himuro, Yukimura and Kanade to Suiu Fujiwara and Chris Florette, a romantic couple in the Natural Sciences Lab. Suiu is fascinated by their research as saliva contains numerous chemicals that indicate health and even emotional status, particularly Oxytocin, Chromogranin A, Serotonin, Estrogen and Testosterone. Seeing Suiu and Chris' physical intimacy makes Himuro and Yukimura jealous but they ask for their help in their research. Chris asks the difficult question that if they are unsure they love each other, then surely they can't love each other, because if they did they wouldn't need scientific evidence to prove it. Despite this Yukimura insists their research must continue. Suiu provides the analysis of her and Chris' saliva after a hug, which Yukimura is shocked is much higher than he and Himuro's following their kiss, suggesting Suiu and Chris are more in love than he and Himuro. As a basic experiment they decide to analyse everyone's saliva when normal, following a compliment, and following physical contact. As an established romantic couple who are comfortable with each other, Suiu and Chris' Oxytocin levels are higher than Himuro and Yukimura's at every stage, even though Himuro and Yukimura managed to kiss again.
14	2	"Science-types Fell in Love, So They Tried Looking for a New Theory."; Transliteration: "Rikei ga Koi ni Ochita no de Atarashii Riron o Sagashite Mita." (Japanese: 理系が恋に落ちたので新しい理論を探してみた。)	Yūji Nakata	Rintarō Ikeda	Akira Nishimori	April 9, 2022
Chris criticises Yukimura, pointing out Himuro was the one who confessed her love to Yukimura, so Yukimura performing experiments instead of giving her a clear answer is unfair. Himuro defends Yukimura, pointing out she agrees with their research. The test shows reduction in their Oxytocin. Yukimura presents Helen Fisher's Three Year Romance Theory which states love has a Romance Phase when emotions are the most unstable, including negative emotions like frustration, due to Dopamine and Norepinephrine. This phase lasts on average three years before reaching Attachment Phase where unstable emotions are replaced with feelings of comfort and security due to Vasopressin which stimulates contentment. By these definitions Suiu and Chris are in Attachment Phase while Yukimura and Himuro are still in Romance Phase where Oxytocin levels fluctuate. Yukimura declares it was wrong of Chris to say he and Himura cannot be in love. Himuro is happy that, even though he never says it, Yukimura continues to demonstrate his desire to prove their love is real. Meanwhile Ibarada and Kosuke unknowingly demonstrate the mechanics of Interpersonal attraction and Gravity as they frequently want to play video games together but due to pride will hardly ever admit it, resulting in distinct phases of physical proximity and physical separation.
15	3	"Science-types Fell in Love, So They Tried Taking a Nap."; Transliteration: "Rikei ga Koi ni Ochita no de Hirune Shite Mita." (Japanese: 理系が恋に落ちたので昼寝してみた。)	Takeshi Shiga	Rintarō Ikeda	Miyana Okita	April 16, 2022
Ibarada is depressed at the general darkness of her life. Ikeda asks her to consider gaining her doctorate. Ikeda produces a pamphlet on the benefits of exercise, such as producing Myokine which stimulate the brain and Serotonin to prevent depression. Himuro catches a cold so Yukimura rushes to her home. Himuro is struggling but when Yukimura arrives she is both upset he is seeing her vulnerable but also happy he is there. Kanade visits and Himuro is so embarrassed she pushes Yukimura under her blanket to hide him, leaving Yukimura trapped against her bare legs for the duration of Kanade's visit. Kosuke witnesses Ibarada exercising. Himuro recovers but Yukimura catches her cold. Ibarada produces research confirming exercise can improve memory. She also torments Kosuke by using Fermi problem's and the work of Frank Drake to calculate that less than two women in the whole of Japan would be his ideal girlfriend, and his chance of meeting either of them in his lifetime are 0.02%. Kosuke has the life altering realisation that his description of his ideal girlfriend matches Ibarada perfectly. Ibarada realises the lab with her friends is the only light place in her dark life and decides she will get her doctorate.
16	4	"Science-types Fell in Love, So They Tried Going to a Live Concert."; Transliteration: "Rikei ga Koi ni Ochita no de Raibu ni Itte Mita." (Japanese: 理系が恋に落ちたのでライブに行ってみた。)	Atsuko Tonomizu	Rintarō Ikeda	Akira Nishimori	April 23, 2022
Kanade takes Himuro and Ibarada on a girl's night. Kanade asks Himuro about Yukimura, but instead of gossip receives a summary of their research. Ibarada reads the research and concludes there is no romantic potential between her and Kosuke. Ibarada plans to help the Kaihori lab with their research. Kosuke attends a concert that includes Hinamori Ren, the actress who portrays his online girlfriend Aika. Kaihori is studying the relationship between idols and fans and invented a unity system so that the idols dancing affects wands held by fans, and fans waving the wands makes the idol's dress glow, each affecting the other. Yukimura takes a job tutoring Kagurano Haru, a high school student who thinks she is unintelligent, especially compared to her older sister. As she is obsessed with the mascot Tapioca Yukimura demonstrates how physics relates to her tapioca smoothie, including friction, inertia, gravity and fluid dynamics, igniting confidence in her own intelligence and a desire to attend university. Ibarada passes out at the concert from exhaustion. She is happy Kosuke had fun, and Kosuke realises the unity system she created was actually designed to make the concert more fun for him and he almost falls in love with her, but stops himself through great mental effort. Shikijou Naoya, a participant from the Okinawa training camp, sees Kanade on the street and impulsively asks her on a date.
17	5	"Science-types Fell in Love, So They Tried Analyzing Their Proof of Love."; Transliteration: "Rikei ga Koi ni Ochita no de Suki no Shōko o Bunseki Ori Shite Mita." (Japanese: 理系が恋に落ちたので好きの証拠を分析折してみた。)	Takeshi Shiga	Rintarō Ikeda	Akira Nishimori	April 30, 2022
Arika arrives with news her manga based on Himuro and Yukimura has been published and offers her readers feedback as to whether they believe Himuro and Yukimura are in love. Unfortunately she has missed her latest deadline and her enormously muscular editor, Ogu, drags her back to work. Kanade remains unsure how to respond to Naoya's confession. Meanwhile her grandpa wants her to take over the family martial arts school but she insists on getting a normal job and one day getting married. As Yukimura had been confessed to in a similar fashion she asks his advice, but Yukimura turns her problem, and her fears associated with it, into an equation with positive and negative factors, reasoning if the end result is positive, she should accept the confession. Despite her confusion and anger she takes his advice, completes the equation, and informs Naoya she cannot accept his confession yet but is happy to see if they can be something more in the future. Despite the reader's feedback overwhelmingly supporting their love, Himuro and Yukimura agree the data must be thoroughly scrutinized to constitute proof. Kosuke is further horrified the data overwhelmingly proves he loves Ibarada. Yukimura is shocked when, in the middle of analysing the data, Himuro reveals her latest discovery; she definitely loves him.
18	6	"Science-types Fell in Love, So They Tried Not Trying to Prove It."; Transliteration: "Rikei ga Koi ni Ochita no de Shōmei o Shūryō Shite Mita." (Japanese: 理系が恋に落ちたので証明を終了してみた。)	Akira Mano	Rintarō Ikeda	Akira Nishimori	May 7, 2022
Yukimura demands the evidence of this discovery. They discuss their research so far and realise that no one piece of evidence can apply to all couples. Thus Yukimura has the revelation the only evidence needed is for one individual to become aware they love someone. As Himuro has concluded she loves him Yukimura desperately writes an equation cataloguing his feelings before declaring he loves Himuro too. Himuro is thrilled, but as a scientist immediately sets new boundaries for their research that says at least once a day they will hug so as to increase the levels of all their love chemicals. Yukimura agrees and is surprised when she immediately hugs and kisses him, not for research, but simply because she wants to. Everyone in the lab celebrates them completing their research. However, they claim their research is merely beginning. While they have proved their love exists they must now research and prove if their love is at the level of romantic partners, or merely friends, and until this new research is complete they are still not actually dating, infuriating Kanade. Kosuke is happy as by the definition of love they have created, he can decide to simply not love Ibarada. Kanade decides to accept that as long as the two know they love each other and are happy spending time together, it will do for now.
19	7	"Science-types Fell in Love, So They Tried Going on a Group Date."; Transliteration: "Rikei ga Koi ni Ochita no de Shūdan Dēto Shite Mita." (Japanese: 理系が恋に落ちたので集団デートしてみた。)	Takeshi Shiga	Rintarō Ikeda	Miyana Okita	May 14, 2022
Kanade reveals she has accepted a date with Naoya and suggests Himuro bring Yukimura for a double-date. Yukimura creates what he calls Kanade-Love points which combines heart rate, time spent together and time spent apart, in this way love can be expressed by assigning a number of Kanade-Loves, infuriating Kanade. During the date Kanade realises they have invited ten other couples as comparisons, including Suiu with Chris, Kosuke with his virtual girlfriend Aika, and two teachers Madoka and Shouki. While clothes shopping Yukimura realises a lot of flirting is taking place and suggests that proximity to so many other romantic couples makes people flirt more obviously. Madoka worries she is too harsh on Shouki, while Shouki worries he is too indecisive. Disaster strikes when Kanade bumps into Takahashi, her old high school teacher who was her first love. Despite feeling emotional Kanade continues her date with Naoya but worries she is no longer acting normally. Yukimura wonders about crowd psychology, in which large groups of people act as a group. This is proven true when Himuro tries to publicly be romantic with Yukimura, as do Suiu and Chris. Madoka is mad when Shouki doesn't due to his indecisiveness but they manage to become closer. Naoya asks if Kanade is alright as she isn't acting normally, upsetting her. She agrees to a second date another time but leaves suddenly, worrying Himuro and Yukimura.
20	8	"Science-types Fell in Love, So They Tried Confessing Their Feelings to Their Juniors."; Transliteration: "Rikei ga Koi ni Ochita no de Kōhai ni Kokuhaku Shite Mita." (Japanese: 理系が恋に落ちたので後輩に告白してみた。)	Masahiro Takata	Rintarō Ikeda	Akira Nishimori	May 21, 2022
Arika reappears and finds Kosuke suffering extreme anguish that he actually felt creepy participating in the date experiment with his Aika doll. Ibarada explains the Kinsey scale of sexual orientation which claims only 46% of people are heterosexual, 6% are homosexual, and 48% are bisexual to various degrees. Kosuke realises he can apply a similar scale to people who prefer 2D characters and those who prefer real people. Arika comes up with a new manga idea but is warned by Ibarada not to portray Kosuke as strange or perverted as he is too important to her. Himuro confesses to Kanade, quoting Rubin's Scale of Love and Like to justify her love for Kanade. Kanade deduces this is Himuro's way of worrying about her and admits that she is scared to love again. Yukimura barges in demanding details for their research and is punished. Kanade reveals she did go on a date with Takahashi, but due to her martial arts training she severely injured him in a moment of panic, leading to her fearing she is incapable of normal romance. Yukimura automatically demands a definition of "normal" which he has noticed Kanade seems to be obsessed with and represses her true self so as to appear "normal", suggesting that until she learns to just be herself, she will never have a happy romance, leaving her in tears.
21	9	"Science-types Fell in Love, So They Tried Preparing for a Campus Festival."; Transliteration: "Rikei ga Koi ni Ochita no de Gakuensai no Junbi o Shite Mita." (Japanese: 理系が恋に落ちたので学園祭の準備をしてみた。)	Takeshi Shiga	Rintarō Ikeda	Miyana Okita	May 28, 2022
Kanade remembers her obsession with "normal" began when her mother thought she would never fit in, so she began forcing herself to copy normal people around her. On her next date with Naoya she asks why he asked her out and he admits it was love at first sight in Okinawa when he saw how capable and confident she was. Kanade is upset as she feels Naoya does not know who she really is. She admits to feeling jealous of her friends who freely act as they like, but is too scared to do it herself. With another festival approaching everyone decides their lab should contribute. Ikeda suggests applying Kanade's Travelling Salesman problem to the festival map, showing couples the best route for a romantic date, but Kanade is unsure. Yukimura wants to run experiments on the crowd to determine how visual appeal affects love, using the work of Elaine Walster on physical appearance to entice romantic partners, and how changing one's appearance can significantly increase attractiveness. Thus he suggests everyone at the festival should cosplay and rate how attractive they find each other. Himuro realises she could force Yukimura to dress as anything she wanted and is looking forward to it. Hoping it will be fun, Kanade decides to invite Naoya. After continuing to observe Kanade, Yukimura calls Chris to ask his help.
22	10	"Science-types Fell in Love, So They Tried Having a Campus Festival."; Transliteration: "Rikei ga Koi ni Ochita no de Gakuensai Shite Mita." (Japanese: 理系が恋に落ちたので学園祭してみた。)	Atsuko Tonomizu	Rintarō Ikeda	Akira Nishimori	June 4, 2022
Haru loses motivation when her father, a famous mathematician, calls her stupid. Yukimura explains to him the Pygmalion effect and the work of Jane Elliot on discrimination in which low expectations of students can actually cause poor performance, thus blaming him for causing Haru's low grades by believing she is stupid when in fact she is quite bright, leaving him speechless. At the festival Kanade avoids Yukimura. Himuro convinces Yukimura to cosplay as a girl, though her eagerness gives Yukimura an ominous feeling. When his female form proves cute enough that even Kosuke begins to fall in love he quickly changes back, to Himuro's disappointment. Haru attends the festival and meets Himuro who, realising she is Yukimura's student, decides to show her the university and they watch Professor Kuze give a lecture on Neutrino's and how they travel through space. She also keeps her away from Suiu's stall testing their new aphrodisiac. As Haru wants to attend the university Himuro gives her her old lab coat to wear when she successfully makes it. Seeing Haru studying to get into university her father realises he should have believed in her from the start and gives her his full support.
23	11	"Science-types Fell in Love, So They Tried Getting Married."; Transliteration: "Rikei ga Koi ni Ochita no de Kekkon Shite Mita." (Japanese: 理系が恋に落ちたので結婚してみた。)	Akira Mano	Rintarō Ikeda	Akira Nishimori	June 11, 2022
The festival continues in full force as Arika drops by the lab, encountering Kosuke and Ena garbed in wedding apparel. Arika is invited to partake in the cosplaying, and she complies, appearing to the two in a wedding dress. Initially, Arika is elated until she is told of a superstition that ladies who wear a wedding dress will delay their marriage, sending her into a panic search as to the validity of this claim. After confirming the lack of conclusive evidence to this hypothesis, Arika laments her not being married before chasing Kosuke out of the lab following a sudden declaration to marry him. Kosuke and Ena reunite and their wedding costumes catch the eye of a young girl excitedly asking if the two will get married. They hold a faux reception to please her, all the while Kosuke feeling conflicted over his own feelings towards Ena. Afterwards, Arika catches the two of them alone and pushes Ena towards Kosuke into a kiss. Kosuke is left completely flustered and after Ena leaves him, she breaks out into a heavy fluster herself. Elsewhere, Kanade continues her date with Naoya. Left alone briefly, Yukimura approaches her and asks her once more if she's content with being empty. As Kanade tells him off again, Naoya returns and tells him to back off before taking an internally apologetic Kanade away. Himuro then appears and encourages Yukimura to give her some more time alone. Night falls, and Naoya asks Kanade once more to go out with him. Though ready to say yes, Kanade unexpectedly rejects him. Naoya does not take this well and breaks down, worrying Kanade immensely.
24	12	"I Tried to Prove that You Are Fine Just as You Are."; Transliteration: "Kimi ga Ari no Mama de Irareru Koto o Shōmei Shite Mita." (Japanese: 君がありのままでいられる事を証明してみた。)	Tōru Kitahata	Rintarō Ikeda	Tōru Kitahata	June 18, 2022
Naoya reveals himself as a sociopath and attacks with a taser. Kanade awakens in a warehouse with Naoya and his thugs. Naoya explains he is also abnormal but decided to pursue normal romance, and when Kanade rejected him he decided she was the abnormal one. Kanade again blames herself for not being normal. Naoya and his thugs decide to rape Kanade. Yukimura arrives to save her. Naoya insists he can return Kanade to perfection. Irritated, Yukimura shows he had Chris do a full analysis of Kanade's DNA which proves Kanade is a perfectly normal human, including supportive interviews from her friends and even Takahashi. Kanade is touched Yukimura risked himself but Naoya and the thugs attack Yukimura. Yukimura reveals his pockets are full of Sulfuric acid and Nitric acid which he throws over them, though reveals it is actually just water as he was delaying while police arrived. Naoya and the thugs are arrested and Yukimura tells Kanade that compared to everyone in their lab, she might be the most normal of them all. The next day Himuro informs a horrified Yukimura that Kanade is now in love with him. Kosuke finally gets the ending he wants in his game and can marry Aika, but hesitates, with Ibarada accusing him of loving someone else. Himuro is excited they can investigate a scenario where one man is loved by multiple women, to discover which of them loves Yukimura the most, and insists they start immediately.

=== Stage play ===
A stage play adaptation was announced in 2022. It was performed at Namba Yes Theater from December 22 to 23, 2024, directed by Masanari Ujigawa and written by Naohiro Ise.

== Reception ==
The manga has over 600,000 copies in print as of 2019.

In 2017, the series was ranked sixth at the third Next Manga Awards in the web category.
