= The Forest of Love =

2019 crime-thriller film by Sion Sono

- Netflix promotional image

Japanese name
- Kanji: 愛なき森で叫べ
- Literal meaning: Scream in the Forest without Love
Transcriptions
- Revised Hepburn: Ainaki Mori de Sakebe
- Directed by: Sion Sono
- Written by: Sion Sono
- Produced by: Hiroshi Muto
- Starring: Kippei Shiina; Kyoko Hinami; Shinnosuke Mitsushima
- Cinematography: Sôhei Tanikawa
- Edited by: Takayuki Masuda
- Music by: Kenji Katoh
- Distributed by: Netflix
- Release date: October 11, 2019
- Running time: 151 minutes
- Country: Japan
- Language: Japanese

The Forest of Love (Japanese: 愛なき森で叫べ, romanized: Ainaki Mori de Sakebe, lit. 'Scream in the Loveless Forest') is a Japanese crime-thriller film by Sion Sono. The film was inspired by the murders, torture and extortion committed in Kyushu, Japan from the mid-1990s to the early 2000s by convicted serial killer Futoshi Matsunaga. The film premiered on October 11, 2019, on Netflix. An extended cut 7-episode limited series version titled The Forest of Love: Deep Cut was also released.

The film and series stars Kippei Shiina, Kyoko Hinami and Shinnosuke Mitsushima.

== Plot ==
Joe Murata sits in a restaurant as the misdeeds of a serial killer are reported on television. Murata carries a yearbook from a girls' school, with numerous photos crossed out. He tells the waiter he's a screenwriter and asks if he knows what it's like to kill someone.

Two young men, Jay and Fukami, meet another young man, Shin, and take him to the vacant warehouse where they're living. Jay says he wants to make movies to explore all kinds of criminal behavior legally. When Shin reveals he's a virgin, Jay takes him to meet a promiscuous girl. The girl, Taeko, refuses Shin but introduces him to her high school classmate, Mitsuko, a shut-in with well-off but strict parents. Mitsuko says she is also a virgin but isn't interested in Shin. Taeko argues she should "make some scars and move on".

In flashback, Mitsuko and Taeko participate in a high school production of Romeo and Juliet, with Mitsuko playing Juliet and Eiko playing Romeo. With little experience with boys at their all-girls school, they explore sexuality and romance among themselves. Eiko is killed in a car accident and the play is cancelled. Five of the girls decide to take sleep medication and stand on the edge of the school roof. Taeko vows to become a "slut" if she survives. All of the girls fall except Mitsuko, who sees a vision of Eiko and doesn't join them. Taeko lands on a parked car and is left with a limp and a scar. She gets "Romeo" tattooed on the scar.

In the present, Mitsuko receives a call from Murata, who claims she had lent him 50 yen several years previously. He claims he is now successful and wants to return the money. They meet at a park, where Murata arrives in a sports car and expresses attraction to her. Shin, Jay, and Fukami watch and record this. Mitsuko watches the video with Taeko and recognizes Murata as a con artist who had claimed to want to marry her sister. Taeko recalls sleeping with Murata and seeing him seduce her mother. The young men obtain a filming crew and begin making a movie about Murata's cons, with Shin as Murata.

Meanwhile, Murata seduces Mitsuko, her younger sister Ami, and Taeko, leaving Mitsuko self-harming herself with a yen. He stages a concert where many of his former victims show up to compete for his affections. The three filmmakers, Mitsuko, and Taeko meet up with him afterwards. Mitsuko reveals she is sleeping with Murata and shows them the burns and scars he left on her. Murata lifts Taeko's shirt to reveal more of the same. Murata says he can help with their movie, as he is wealthy. Fukami quits and leaves. The others accept.

It is revealed Murata has no money. The film crew quits, leaving Jay, Shin, Taeko, and Mitsuko on the project. Murata takes over the film and revels in cruelty to them. Mitsuko says she is pregnant with his child. Murata takes them to a country house and coaches Mitsuko in a scene where she strangles Jay. Jay dies. Murata convinces them to destroy and dump Jay's remains in the lake. Taeko jumps from the boat to escape but is killed by an unknown gunman.

They go to Mitsuko's home, where Murata uses Mitsuko's involvement in Jay's death to blackmail her parents, torturing them on camera. He tells them to get a relative to fund the film. Ami enjoys his torture of her parents and Mitsuko. Mitsuko attempts suicide after watching Ami have sex with Murata. Murata, Ami, and Shin decide "tomorrow will be Mitsuko's death scene". Mitsuko and Ami go dress shopping for the scene, and Ami thwarts her attempt to escape. For trying to escape she is electrocuted and that is why Mitsuko has a miscarriage and is hospitalized.

The relative discovers the film company is a sham and arrives to demand his money back. Inside the house, he encounters Mitsuko's drunk, raving parents. Murata and Shin return to find Mitsuko's father has hanged himself. Her mother and relative lie on the floor with a bloody knife nearby. Ami returns home to find Murata and Shin have dismembered the relative. She decapitates her father and discovers her mother is alive. At her mother's request, Ami kills her.

Murata, Shin, and Ami take Mitsuko to a forest, where she agrees to be killed. She explains she had not taken the sleep medication and had hoped Taeko would die, that she had sex with her friends' boyfriends as well as Ami's. She had known Murata was a con artist and Shin was a killer but hoped they would kill Ami, her parents, and Taeko.

Shin shoots Ami and Mitsuko, then gives the gun to Murata and orders him to kill Ami, who is begging Murata for her life. Shin berates Murata then kills Ami himself. He reveals himself to be the serial killer reported on the news. They fight, and Murata escapes and waves down a car driven by a woman who resembles Eiko. When asked where she is heading, she answers, "To hell." Shin takes the car they came in and gives a lift to a woman with car troubles. He sees Eiko by the side of the road, stops, and runs into the forest after her.

On-screen text states that those behind the murders that inspired the film were caught in 2002 and sentenced to life imprisonment.

== Cast ==
- Kippei Shiina as Joe Murata
- Shinnosuke Mitsushima as Shin
- Kyoko Hinami as Taeko
- Eri Kamataki as Mitsuko
- Sei Matobu as Mitsuko's mother
- Denden as Mitsuko's father
- Young Dais as Jay
- Natsuki Kawamura as Eiko/Romeo
- Yuzuka Nakaya as Ami
- Dai Hasegawa as Fukami

== Release ==
The Forest of Love was first screened on June 25, 2019, at the Netflix Originals Festival in Tokyo, Japan. The film received its wide released on October 11, 2019, on Netflix.

The Forest of Love: Deep Cut was released on Netflix on April 30, 2020, as an extended cut limited series with 7 episodes, featuring an extra 2 hours and 15 minutes duration in addition to the original film, for a total runtime of 278 minutes.

== Reception ==
On Rotten Tomatoes, The Forest of Love holds an approval rating of 100% based on 11 reviews, with an average rating of 6.5/10. David Ehrlich of IndieWire gave the film a B− saying, "As frenzied as Sono’s best work, but as unfocused as some of his worst, 'The Forest of Love' is hard to find your way through. It’s repetitive and self-contradictory in a way that Sono doesn’t always seem to have under his control... But Sono’s natural discordance is part of what makes him so necessary. Even the most extreme DIY filmmakers are seldom this feral or willing to follow their muse into the darkness." Brian Tallerco of RogerEbert.com wrote, "It is a movie that wallows in its excess, undeniably long and repetitive and somewhat nonsensical, but never boring." With regard to the film's length, Tallerco wrote, "There’s no reason for this movie to run over two-and-a-half hours. Some of the scenes wallow in their length like they're challenging you to switch away." Nevertheless, he wrote, "There’s too much filmmaking craft on display to care that this movie seems to go on forever. Hardcore Sono fans may wish it was longer." Tallerco gave the film a 3/4 score.
