= Unofficial Sentai Akibaranger =

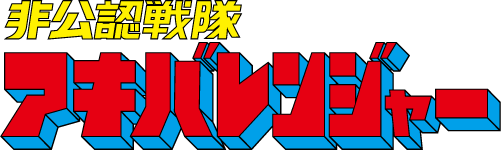
- Logo
- Genre: Tokusatsu, parody, comedy
- Created by: Saburo Yatsude
- Based on: Super Sentai
- Written by: Naruhisa Arakawa; Junko Kōmura
- Directed by: Ryuta Tasaki; Nobuhiro Suzumura
- Starring: Masato Wada; Kyoko Hinami; Shione Sawada; Karin Ogino; Maaya Uchida; Honoka; Kazuki Yao; Ryō Horikawa
- Opening theme: "Unofficial Sentai Akibaranger" by Haruko Momoi feat. Yukio Yamagata
- Ending theme: "Ashita wa Akiba no Kaze ga Fuku" by Nobuo Akagi (Masato Wada) "Super Sentai Hikōnin Ōenka" by Nobuo Akagi (Masato Wada), Yukio Yamagata, and Mojo
- Composer: Kenji Kawai
- Country of origin: Japan
- No. of seasons: 2
- No. of episodes: 26 (list of episodes)

Production
- Producers: Jun Hikasa; Akira Ishikawa; Taku Mochizuki (Toei); Kōichi Yada (Toei Agency)
- Running time: 26 minutes (per episode)
- Production companies: Toei Company; Toei Advertising

Original release
- Network: BS Asahi; Tokyo MX; TV Osaka; TV Aichi
- Release: April 6, 2012 – June 28, 2013

Related
- Joshi Zu; Kamen Rider Amazons

Unofficial Sentai Akibaranger (非公認戦隊アキバレンジャー, Hikōnin Sentai Akibarenjā) is a Japanese tokusatsu comedy drama based on the Super Sentai Series. It is not part of the official line up in Toei Company's Super Sentai franchise, but is instead a self-parody geared towards adults as opposed to a general audience for the mainstream series. The show aired on BS Asahi (TV Asahi's broadcast satellite channel) starting April 6, 2012, and Tokyo MX starting April 9, 2012.

A second season was officially announced in January 2013 at a teaser event tying in with the final appearances of the characters from Tokumei Sentai Go-Busters, featuring Masato Wada, who performs as main character Nobuo Akagi. The second season is titled Unofficial Sentai Akibaranger: Season Tsuu (非公認戦隊アキバレンジャー シーズン痛(ツー), Hikōnin Sentai Akibaranger: Shīzun Tsū) and premiered on April 5, 2013.

== Plot ==
Three individuals (a Super Sentai otaku, a cosplay otaku, and a closet anime otaku) are chosen by a beautiful scientist otaku to become the "Unofficial Sentai Akibaranger" and "protect Akihabara" from powerful otaku villains that only exist in their delusions. However, the otaku fight eventually gets literally real when their "otaku enemies" begin to materialize in the real world.

== Episodes ==
All episode titles in Season 1 use variations of the kanji 痛 generally read as ita, usually translated as "pain", and is related to the otaku phenomenon of the itasha. Several episode titles reference past Super Sentai titles. Examples include episode 2, with the word "Full Blast" referencing Tokusou Sentai Dekaranger, and episode 3, with the word "Adventure (冒険, Bōken)" referencing GoGo Sentai Boukenger. The episode titles in Season Tsuu have the word "Delusion" (妄想, Mōsō). The first season aired from April 6 to June 29, 2012 and the second season aired from April 5, 2013 to June 28, 2013.

=== Season 1 ===
| No. | Title | Writer | Original release date |
|---|---|---|---|
| 1 | "Pain Is Power"; Transliteration: "Itasa wa Tsuyosa" (Japanese: 痛さは強さ) | Naruhisa Arakawa | April 6, 2012 |
| 2 | "The Bizarrely-Decorated Vehicle's Activation Unleashes a Red Delusionary Full Blast"; Transliteration: "Saiki suru Itadamashii ga Yobu Akaki Mōsō no Furu Burasuto" (Japanese: 再起する痛魂が喚ぶ赤き妄想のフルブラスト) | Naruhisa Arakawa | April 13, 2012 |
| 3 | "Ouch! Drunken Hero Adventure!!"; Transliteration: "Itata! Yoidore Hīrō Dai Bōken!!" (Japanese: 痛タッ！酔いどれヒーロー大冒険！！) | Junko Kōmura | April 20, 2012 |
| 4 | "Forbidden Delusion Is the Pain of an Immoral Blue"; Transliteration: "Kinjirareta Mōsō wa Aoi Haitoku no Itami" (Japanese: 禁じられた妄想は青い背徳の痛み) | Junko Kōmura | April 27, 2012 |
| 5 | "Our Pain ☆ Yellow Mama"; Transliteration: "Itaita ☆ Ierō Mama" (Japanese: イタイタ☆イエローママ) | Junko Kōmura | May 4, 2012 |
| 6 | "Take Flight Leader! The Painful Trap of Deluded Photography"; Transliteration: "Habatake Ōgosho! Mōsō Satsueijo no Itai Wana" (Japanese: はばたけ大御所！妄想撮影所の痛い罠) | Naruhisa Arakawa | May 11, 2012 |
| 7 | "Delirious Runaway Itasher Break Through the Limit!"; Transliteration: "Mōsō Itasshā Genkai Toppa seyo!" (Japanese: 妄走イタッシャー限界突破せよ！) | Naruhisa Arakawa | May 18, 2012 |
| 8 | "The Bonds of Painful Special Training Are the Authorization Road's Conspiracy Intersection"; Transliteration: "Itaki Tokkun no Kizuna wa Kōnin Rōdo no Inbō Kōsaten" (Japanese: 痛き特訓の絆は公認ロードの陰謀交差点) | Junko Kōmura | May 25, 2012 |
| 9 | "The Pain Sentai Disbands."; Transliteration: "Ita Sentai, Kaisan." (Japanese: 痛戦隊、解散。) | Junko Kōmura | June 1, 2012 |
| 10 | "The Painlessly Inducing Curse of Z ― Into a New Chapter"; Transliteration: "Hitsū naru Zetto no Noroi ― Soshite Shin Shō e" (Japanese: 非痛なるZの呪い ― そして新章へ) | Naruhisa Arakawa | June 8, 2012 |
| 11 | "The Second Generation Is a Fresh and Painless Warrior"; Transliteration: "Nidaime wa Sawayaka Mutsū Senshi" (Japanese: 二代目はサワヤカ無痛戦士) | Naruhisa Arakawa | June 15, 2012 |
| 12 | "Most Painful Times. Farewell, Delusional Sentai"; Transliteration: "Saitsūkai Saraba Mōsō Sentai" (Japanese: 最痛回 さらば妄想戦隊) | Naruhisa Arakawa | June 22, 2012 |
| 13 | "Evaluation Meeting! If You Don't Hurt, That's Alright!"; Transliteration: "Hanseikai! Itakunakereba Zattsu Ōrai!" (Japanese: 反省会！痛くなければザッツオーライ！) | Junko Kōmura | June 29, 2012 |

=== Season 2 ===
| No. | Title | Writer | Original release date |
|---|---|---|---|
| 14 | "Delusion War"; Transliteration: "Mōsō Taisen" (Japanese: 妄想大戦) | Naruhisa Arakawa | April 5, 2013 |
| 15 | "Chinese Delusion"; Transliteration: "Mōsō Chūka" (Japanese: 妄想中華) | Naruhisa Arakawa | April 12, 2013 |
| 16 | "Martial Arts Delusion"; Transliteration: "Mōsō Kengeki" (Japanese: 妄想拳劇) | Naruhisa Arakawa | April 19, 2013 |
| 17 | "Delusional Goddess"; Transliteration: "Mōsō Megami" (Japanese: 妄想女神) | Naruhisa Arakawa | April 26, 2013 |
| 18 | "Delusional Import"; Transliteration: "Mōsō Yunyū" (Japanese: 妄想輸入) | Naruhisa Arakawa | May 3, 2013 |
| 19 | "Delusional Niangniang"; Transliteration: "Mōsō Nyannyan" (Japanese: 妄想娘娘（ニャンニャン）) | Naruhisa Arakawa | May 10, 2013 |
| 20 | "Delusional Spy"; Transliteration: "Mōsō Kanja" (Japanese: 妄想間者) | Naruhisa Arakawa | May 17, 2013 |
| 21 | "Delusional Beautiful Fight"; Transliteration: "Mōsō Bitō" (Japanese: 妄想美闘) | Naruhisa Arakawa | May 24, 2013 |
| 22 | "Delusion Number Two"; Transliteration: "Mōsō Nigō" (Japanese: 妄想弐號) | Naruhisa Arakawa | May 31, 2013 |
| 23 | "Delusional Pillow Talk"; Transliteration: "Mōsō Makurakotoba" (Japanese: 妄想枕語) | Naruhisa Arakawa | June 7, 2013 |
| 24 | "Delusional Cemetery"; Transliteration: "Mōsō Bochi" (Japanese: 妄想墓地) | Naruhisa Arakawa | June 14, 2013 |
| 25 | "Delusional Apostle"; Transliteration: "Mōsō Shito" (Japanese: 妄想使徒) | Naruhisa Arakawa | June 21, 2013 |
| 26 | "Delusional Compilation"; Transliteration: "Mōsō Shūhen" (Japanese: 妄想集編) | Naruhisa Arakawa | June 28, 2013 |

== Web radio series ==
On July 6, Animate.tv started broadcasting Unofficial Sentai Akibaranger Official Web Radio (Temporary) (非公認戦隊アキバレンジャー公認ＷＥＢラジオ（仮）, Hikōnin Sentai Akibarenjā Kōnin Webu Rajio (Kari)). The bi-weekly web radio series is hosted by Masato Wada, who plays Nobuo Akagi in the TV series. Other cast members from the series, as well as voice actors from other Super Sentai series, make guest appearances.

== Cast ==
- Nobuo Akagi (赤木 信夫, Akagi Nobuo): Masato Wada (和田 正人, Wada Masato)
- Mitsuki Aoyagi (青柳 美月, Aoyagi Mitsuki): Kyoko Hinami (日南 響子, Hinami Kyōko) (Season 1)
- Luna Iwashimizu (石清水 美月, Iwashimizu Runa): Shione Sawada (澤田 汐音, Sawada Shione) (Season 2)
- Yumeria Moegi (萌黄 ゆめりあ, Moegi Yumeria)/Yuko Yokoyama (横山 優子, Yokoyama Yūko): Karin Ogino (荻野 可鈴, Ogino Karin)
- Hiroyo Hakase (葉加瀬 博世, Hakase Hiroyo)/Hiroyo Tsuzuki (都築 博世, Tsuzuki Hiroyo), Aoi Ichikawa (市川 葵, Ichikawa Aoi) (Voice): Maaya Uchida (内田 真礼, Uchida Maaya)
- KozuKozu Mita (三田 こずこず, Mita Kozukozu): Kozue Aikawa (愛川 こずえ, Aikawa Kozue; of Danceroid)
- Sayaka Honiden (本位田 さやか, Hon'iden Sayaka): Miiko Morita (森田 美位子, Morita Miiko) (Season 1)
- Tazuko (たづ子): Yuki Ueda (植田 ゆう希, Ueda Yūki)
- Takuma Tsuzuki (都築 タクマ, Tsuzuki Takuma): Shinpei Takagi (高木 心平, Takagi Shinpei) (Season 1)
- Malseena (マルシーナ, Marushīna)/Ruka Marushina (マルシナ 瑠夏, Marushīna Ruka) (Episode 2): Honoka (穂花)
- Doctor Z (ドクターZ, Dokutā Zetto): Kazuki Yao (矢尾 一樹, Yao Kazuki) (Season 1)
- General Tsuu (ツー将軍, Tsū Shōgun): Ryō Horikawa (堀川 りょう, Horikawa Ryō) (Season 2)
- Delu Knight (デリューナイト, Deryū Naito; Voice): Hiroaki Hirata (平田 広明, Hirata Hiroaki)

=== Guest stars ===
Season One

- Himself, Deka Red (Banban "Ban" Akaza, Voice): Ryuji Sainei (載寧 龍二, Sainei Ryūji; 2)
- Bouken Red (Satoru Akashi, Voice): Mitsuomi Takahashi (高橋 光臣, Takahashi Mitsuomi; 3, 11)
- Customer at Café: Yoshinobu Kaneko (金子 吉延, Kaneko Yoshinobu; 3) (Note: Yoshinobu Kaneko previously portrayed Aokage in Akakage, The Masked Ninja.)
- Masako Yamada: Rica Matsumoto (松本 梨香, Matsumoto Rika; 5)
- Himself: Kazuo Niibori (新堀 和男, Niibori Kazuo; 6)
- Customer at Café: Keiichi Sato (さとう けいいち, Satō Keiichi; 7)
- Staff of Animation Studio: Mitsu Murata (村田 充, Murata Mitsu; 8, 10) (Note: Mitsu Murata previously portrayed Douji in Kamen Rider Hibiki and Bishop in Kamen Rider Kiva.)
- Guard at Toei: Tomokazu Seki (関 智一, Seki Tomokazu; 8)
- Producer Tsukada (Voice): Yasuhiro Takato (高戸 靖広, Takato Yasuhiro; 8, 9)
- Café maids: Danceroid (9)
- Herself: Haruko Momoi (桃井 はるこ, Momoi Haruko; 9)
- Himself: Yukio Yamagata (山形 ユキオ, Yamagata Yukio; 9)
- Narrator: Hironori Miyata (宮田 浩徳, Miyata Hironori; 11-13)
- Mio Usagi: Julia Nagano (長野 じゅりあ, Nagano Juria; 12) (Note: Julia Nagano previously portrayed Mio Usagi in the Ryuta Tasaki film Salvage Mice.)

Season Two

- Owner of Toy Shop: Yuu Kamio (神尾 佑, Kamio Yū; 1) (Note: Yuu Kamio previously portrayed Kiyoto Maki in Kamen Rider OOO.)
- Male Past Sentai Warriors (Voice), China Red (Voice), Tyrano Ranger (Voice), Hurricane Red (Voiced), Kabuto Raiger (Voice): Tomokazu Seki (1–3, 5, 7, 10)
- Male Past Sentai Warriors (Voice), Dragon Ranger (Voice), Hurricane Yellow (Voice), Kuwaga Raiger (Voice): Takeshi Kusao (草尾 毅, Kusao Takeshi; 1, 5, 7)
- Female Past Sentai Warriors (Voice), Sanae Yuru (Voice), Hurricane Blue (Voice): Akiko Nakagawa (中川 亜紀子, Nakagawa Akiko; 1, 6, 7)
- Kiba Ranger (Voice): Wataru Abe (阿部 渡, Abe Wataru; 2, 3)
- Ryu Ranger (Ryo of the Heavenly Fire Star, Voice): Keiichi Wada (和田 圭市, Wada Keiichi; 3)
- Himself: Yukio Yamagata (3)
- Himself: MoJo (3)
- Yasuko Yokoyama: Mitsuko Horie (堀江 美都子, Horie Mitsuko; 4)
- Akina Maihama: Sakina Kuwae (桑江 咲菜, Kuwae Sakina; 5)
- George Spielburton: Koichi Sakamoto (坂本 浩一, Sakamoto Kōichi; 5)
- Himself: Nobuo Tanaka (田中 信夫, Tanaka Nobuo; 6)
- Yuru-Chara Jigen (Voice), Herself: Haruko Momoi (6, 10)
- Hadezukin (Voice): Nao Nagasawa (長澤 奈央, Nagasawa Nao; 7)
- Himself: Yoshinori Okamoto (岡本 美登, Okamoto Yoshinori; 8)
- Himself: Seiji Takaiwa (高岩 成二, Takaiwa Seiji; 8)
- Customer at Karaoke Box: Taito Hashimoto (橋本 汰斗, Hashimoto Taito; 8) (Note: Taito Hashimoto previously portrayed Kazari in Kamen Rider OOO.)
- Nurse Hirata: Yuka Hirata (平田 裕香, Hirata Yuka; 10, 11)
- Prism Ace (Voice): Tōru Furuya (古谷 徹, Furuya Tōru; 12)

== Staff ==
- Z-Cune Aoi Character design: Keiichi Sato (さとう けいいち, Satō Keiichi)

== Theme songs ==
=== Season 1 ===
Opening theme

- "Unofficial Sentai Akibaranger" (非公認戦隊アキバレンジャー, Hikōnin Sentai Akibarenjā)
  - Lyrics & Composition: Haruko Momoi
  - Arrangement: Hiroaki Kagoshima
  - Artist: Haruko Momoi feat. Yukio Yamagata
  Theme of the first season.

Ending theme

- "Ashita wa Akiba no Kaze ga Fuku" (明日はアキバの風が吹く; "Akiba's Wind Will Blow Tomorrow")
  - Lyrics: Mike Sugiyama
  - Composition: EFY
  - Arrangement: Makoto Miyazaki
  - Artist: Nobuo Akagi (Masato Wada)
  In most episodes, the ending theme features a monologue by a character in the series talking about himself/herself, adding details to their background.

=== Season 2 ===
Opening theme

- "Akibaranger Season Tsuu!" (アキバレンジャー シーズン痛!, Akibaranger Shīzun Tsū!)
  - Lyrics & Composition: Haruko Momoi
  - Arrangement: Hiroaki Kagoshima
  - Artist: Haruko Momoi feat. Yukio Yamagata & MoJo
  In episode 1, "Demo DEMO Version" (でもDEMOバージョン, Demo Demo Bājon; "But Demo Version") of this song sung only by Haruko Momoi is used.

Ending themes

- "Super Sentai ☆ Hikōnin Ōenka" (スーパー戦隊☆非公認応援歌, Sūpā Sentai Hikōnin Ōenka; "Super Sentai Unofficial Fan Song")
  - Lyrics: Mike Sugiyama
  - Composition: Seiji Miura
  - Arrangement: Yasumasa Sato
  - Artist: Nobuo Akagi (Masato Wada), Yukio Yamagata, & Mojo
  - Episode: 1
  In episode 8, "Mōsō Senshi ver." (妄想戦士ver, Mōsō Senshi Bājon; "Delusional Warrior ver.") of this song sung by Nobuo Akagi, Luna Iwashimizu, and Yuko Yokoyama is used. In episode 13, "ver. MAX!!" of this song sung by Nobuo Akagi, Luna Iwashimizu, Yuko Yokoyama, Haruko Momoi, Yukio Yamagata, and MoJo is used.
- "Fight! Sun Vulcan Robo" (ファイト!サンバルカンロボ, Faito! San Barukan Robo)
  - Lyrics: Keisuke Yamakawa
  - Composition: Michiaki Watanabe
  - Arrangement: Hisashi Ichi
  - Artist: Yuko Yokoyama (Karin Ogino)
  - Episode: 2
  Image song from Taiyo Sentai Sun Vulcan covered by Yuko Yokoyama.
- "Go! Love Sick"
  - Lyrics: Shoko Fujibayashi
  - Composition & Arrangement: Toshihiko Sahashi
  - Artist: Luna Iwashimizu (Shione Sawada)
  - Episode: 3
  Image song from Kyuukyuu Sentai GoGoFive covered by Luna Iwashimizu.
- "Cap-tan Chu-Chu-Chu" (キャプたん Chu-Chu-Chu, Kyapu-tan Chu-Chu-Chu)
  - Lyrics: Saburo Hatte, Ritsuho Urabe
  - Composition & Arrangement: Akihiro Komori
  - Artist: Etsuko Horimi (Mitsuko Horie)
  - Episode: 4
  Song based on the opening theme "Tatakae! Ninja Captor" (斗え!忍者キャプター, Tatakae! Ninja Kyaputā; "Fight! Ninja Captor") of Ninja Captor.
- "girls in trouble! DEKARANGER"
  - Lyrics: Shoko Fujibayashi
  - Composition: Yūmao
  - Arrangement: Yukihiko Nishihata
  - Artist: Nobuo Akagi & General Two (Masato Wada & Ryō Horikawa)
  - Episode: 5
  Alternate ending theme song from Tokusou Sentai Dekaranger covered by Nobuo Akagi and General Two.
- "Yume o Kanaete Dynaman ~Sayoko Hagiwara Version~" (夢をかなえてダイナマン～萩原佐代子バージョン～, Yume o Kanaete Dainaman ~Hagiwara Sayoko Bājon~; "Dynaman Fulfills Our Dreams")
  - Lyrics: Kazuo Koike
  - Composition & Arrangement: Kensuke Kyo
  - Artist: Hiroyo Hakase (Maaya Uchida)
  - Episode: 6
  The song from Kagaku Sentai Dynaman covered by Hiroyo Hakase.
- "Shinken Matsuri" (シンケン祭り; "Shinken Festival")
  - Lyrics: Shoko Fujibayashi
  - Composition & Arrangement: Jack Denyor
  - Artist: Luna Iwashimizu, Yuko Yokoyama, Malseena, & Nobuo Akagi (Shione Sawada, Karin Ogino, Honoka, & Masato Wada)
  - Episode: 7
  Image song from Samurai Sentai Shinkenger covered by Luna Iwashimizu, Yuko Yokoyama, Malseena, and Nobuo Akagi.
- "HOT! HOT! Gao Muscle!!" (HOT! HOT! ガオマッスル!!, Hotto! Hotto! Gao Massuru!!)
  - Lyrics: Nagae Kuwahara
  - Composition & Arrangement: Kōtarō Nakagawa
  - Artist: KozuKozu Mita (Kozue Aikawa)
  - Episode: 9
  Image song from Hyakujuu Sentai Gaoranger covered by KozuKozu Mita.
- "Ki no Sei ka na" (気のせいかな; "Isn't It Imagination?")
  - Lyrics: Saburo Yatsude
  - Composition & Arrangement: Taka-Tora
  - Artist: General Two (Ryō Horikawa)
  - Episode: 10
  Ending theme song from Denji Sentai Megaranger covered by General Two.
- "Dolla! ~Majo Bandora no Theme~" (Dolla! ～魔女バンドーラのテーマ～, Dōra! ~Majo Bandōra no Tēma~; "Dolla! ~Theme of Witch Bandora~")
  - Lyrics: Kayoko Fuyumori
  - Composition & Arrangement: KAZZ TOYAMA
  - Artist: Malseena (Honoka)
  - Episode: 11
  Image song from Kyōryū Sentai Zyuranger covered by Malseena.
- "Shot Bomber Zenryoku Shūchū" (ショットボンバー全力集中, Shotto Bonbā Zenryoku Shūchū; "Shot Bomber All Power Focused")
  - Lyrics: Kazunori Sonobe
  - Composition: Takeshi Ike
  - Arrangement: Daito Fujita
  - Artist: Luna Iwashimizu, Yuko Yokoyama, Hiroyo Hakase, & KozuKozu Mita (Shione Sawada, Karin Ogino, Maaya Uchida, & Kozue Aikawa)
  - Episode: 12
  Movie theme song from Hikari Sentai Maskman covered by Luna Iwashimizu, Yuko Yokoyama, Hiroyo Hakase, and KozuKozu Mita.
