= Karin Ogino =

Japanese singer, gravure model, and voice actress (born 1995)

- 荻野 可鈴
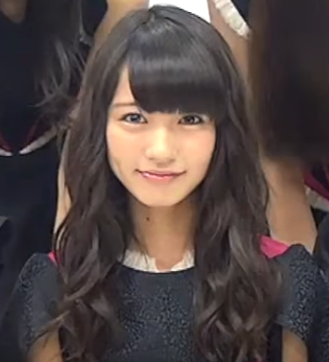
- Ogino in June 2015
- Born: October 12, 1995 (age 29); Kai, Yamanashi, Japan
- Other names: Karinchan (かりんちゃん); Kopochin (こぽちん)
- Occupations: Singer; voice actress; actress; model
- Years active: 2008–present
- Agent: Tambourine Artists
- Notable work: Unofficial Sentai Akibaranger as Yumeria Moegi/Akiba Yellow; Oshiete! 3 Shimai as Saya Sanjo (2010-2012)
- Height: 150 cm (4 ft 11 in)
- Spouse: Unknown (m. 2024)
- Children: 1
- Modeling information
- Hair color: Black
- Eye color: Brown

Karin Ogino (荻野 可鈴, Ogino Karin; born October 12, 1995 in Kai, Yamanashi) is a Japanese actress, voice actress, singer, and model, known for her role as Yumeria Moegi/Akiba Yellow in the 2012 Super Sentai parody series Unofficial Sentai Akibaranger. She is affiliated with Tambourine Artists and also leader of idol girl group Yumemiru Adolescence.

== Personal life ==
On April 1, 2024, Ogino announced her marriage together with her pregnancy. On July 16 of the same year, they announced the birth of their first child.

== Discography ==
- "Tesagure! Bukatsu-mono Kanren Gakkyoku-shūte Sagure! Uta Mono":
  - Stand Up!!!! and 12-Kagetsu with Nishi Asuka, Akesaka Satomi and Ayaka Ōhashi. Tesagure! Bukatsu-mono Theme Song
  - Call Me "Lazy"
- "Tesagure! Bukatsu-mono Anko ̄ru Kanren Gakkyoku-shūte Sagure! Uta mo no Anko ̄ru":
  - Chan to Stand Up !!!! and Tesaguri bu bu Uta with Nishi Asuka, Akesaka Satomi and Ayaka Ōhashi
  - Sorezore no 12-kagetsu with Nishi Asuka, Akesaka Satomi, Ayaka Ōhashi and Reina Ueda
- "Tesa pull! Uta mono":
  - Kira Kira Baby×Baby with Mikako Komatsu
  - Tesaguri Musical with Nishi Asuka, Akesaka Satomi, Ayaka Ōhashi and Reina Ueda

== Filmography ==
=== Film ===
- Kamen Rider OOO Wonderful: The Shogun and the 21 Core Medals as Bell (2011)
- Cellular Girlfriend + as the main role (2012)
- Boku ga Shûgaku Ryokô ni Ikenakatta Riyû (2013)
- Finding the Adolescence as Ayumi Sugai (2014)
- SUPER Horrifying Story as Misa (2016)
- SUPER Horrifying Story 2 as Miwa (2017)
- Proof of Love as Ena Ibarada (2019)

=== TV series ===
- Yume no Mitsuke-kata Oshietaru! 2 as Aoyama Kumiko (2010)
- Motto Anata no Shiranai Sekai 〜 Kuro Neko no Noroi 〜 as Uchiyama Erika (2011)
- Unofficial Sentai Akibaranger as Yumeria Moegi/Akiba Yellow (2012)
- Unofficial Sentai Akibaranger: Season 2 as Yuko Yokoyama/Akiba Yellow (2013)
- Proof of Love as Ena Ibarada (2018)

=== Stage ===
- Butai ore wa Hon'nouji ni Ari?! as Mao Shibasaki (2010)
- Tiger & Bunny THE LIVE as Kaede Kaburagi (2012)
- Gyakuten Saiban: Gyakuten no Spotlight (Turnabout Spotlight) as Mayoi Ayasato (2013, 2014)
- K as Anna Kushina (2014)
- Vampire Knight as Maria Kurenai (2014)
- Gyakuten Saiban 2: Saraba, Gyakuten (Farewell, My Turnabout) as Mayoi Ayasato (2015)
- Vampire knight -Revive- as Maria Kurenai (2015)
- Ranpo Kitan Game of Laplace ～Panorama Shima no Kaijin～ as Tokiko (2018)

=== Anime ===
- Shimajirō Hesoka as Saya Sanjo (2010, on "Oshiete! 3 Shimai")
- Ichigo Ichie: Kimi no Kotoba (2010–2011)
- be Ponkickies "Rongomax" as Emi (2012)
- Copinks! Stories as Quince
- Tesagure! Bukatsu-mono series as Aoi Takahashi
  - Tesagure! Bukatsu-mono (2013)
  - Tesagure! Bukatsu-mono Encore (2013)
  - Tesagure! Bukatsumono Spin-off Purupurun Sharumu to Asobou (2014)
- Himote House as Nyarin (2018)

=== Game ===
- Miracle Girls Festival as Aoi Takahashi (2015)
- Tesagure! Game-mono as Aoi Takahashi (2017)

=== Image DVD ===
- Ogikari no Tonari (2011)
- Suki Nanda mon 〜Wakeari no Tabi〜 (2011)
- Seishun 〜Another Edition〜 (2014)

== Bibliography ==
- Karin Ogino First Photo Book "Seishun ~Daini Shou~ " (2014)
