= Salvage Mice =

- Directed by: Ryuta Tasaki
- Screenplay by: Megumi Taguchi
- Produced by: Otsuji Shigeru; Hirofumi Shigemura
- Starring: Mitsuki Tanimura; Julia Nagano; Kai Shishido
- Cinematography: Takashi Komatsu
- Edited by: Noihciro Sagara
- Music by: Yasukawa Goro
- Production companies: Hiroshima Home Television; King Records
- Distributed by: T-Joy
- Release dates: October 22, 2011 (Hiroshima); March 24, 2012 (Japan)
- Running time: 82 minutes
- Country: Japan
- Language: Japanese

Salvage Mice (サルベージ・マイス, Sarubēji Maisu) is a 2011 Japanese film directed by Ryuta Tasaki.

== Cast ==
- Mitsuki Tanimura as Maisu/Salvage Mice
- Julia Nagano as Mio Usagi
- Kai Shishido
- Yuki Sato
- Seiya Osada
- Maxwell Powers as the voice of Mob Boss

== See also ==
- Unofficial Sentai Akibaranger - A TV series also directed by Ryuta Tasaki, featuring a cameo appearance by Mio Usagi.
