= Kyoko Hinami =

Japanese gravure idol and actress (born 1994)

Kyoko Hinami 日南 響子
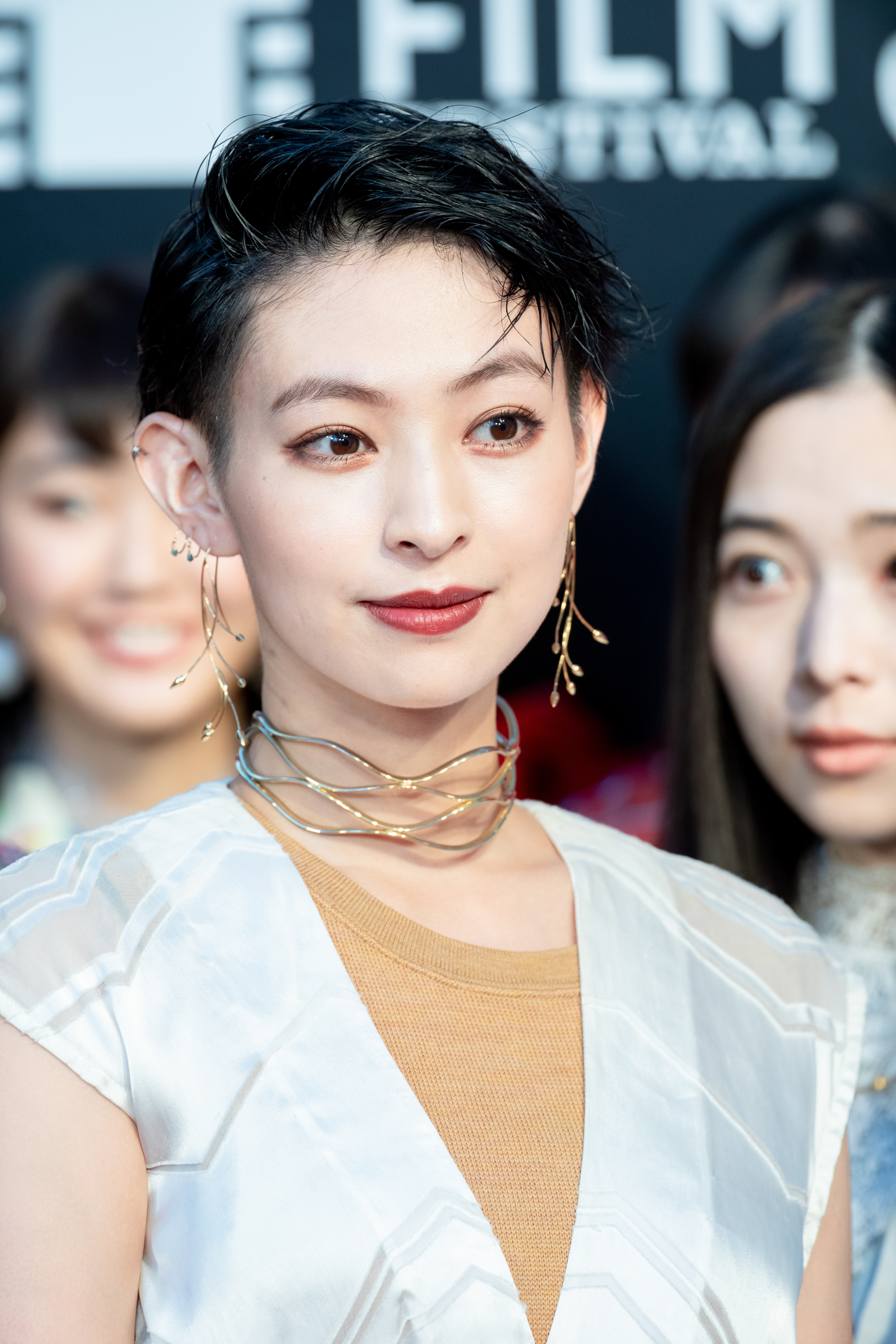
- Hinami at Opening Ceremony of the Tokyo International Film Festival 2018.
- Born: February 6, 1994 (age 32); Inazawa, Aichi, Japan
- Years active: 2010–present
- Spouse: Unknown (m. 2023)
- Children: 1
- Modeling information
- Height: 1.67 m (5 ft 5 1/2 in)
- Website: Official site

Kyoko Hinami (日南 響子, Hinami Kyōko; born February 6, 1994 in Aichi Prefecture, Japan) is a Japanese gravure idol and actress known for her role as Mitsuki Aoyagi/Akiba Blue in the 2012 Super Sentai parody series Unofficial Sentai Akibaranger. She was affiliated with Stardust Promotion.

== Personal life ==
On October 23, 2023, she announced her marriage and pregnancy of her first child. She later gave birth to her first child on November 27.

== Filmography ==
=== TV series ===
- Hammer Session! (2010)
- Rokudenashi Blues (2011)
- Unofficial Sentai Akibaranger as Mitsuki Aoyagi/Akiba Blue (2012)
- Unofficial Sentai Akibaranger: Season 2 as Mitsuki Aoyagi/Akiba Blue (2013, episode 1)

=== TV commercials ===
- Harvest Moon: The Tale of Two Towns (2010)
- Pepsi NEX (2012)

=== Film ===
- Vanished: Age 7 (2011)
- Princess Sakura: Forbidden Pleasures (2013)
- Shimauma (2016)
- The Gun (2018)
- 21st Century Girl (2019)
- Rolling Marbles (2019)
- The Forest of Love (2019)
- The Gun 2020 (2020)
- Owari ga Hajimari (2021)
