= Miiko Morita =

Miiko Morita 森田 美位子
- Born: February 12, 1987 (age 38); Hyōgo Prefecture, Japan
- Modeling information
- Height: 1.55 m (5 ft 1 in)
- Hair color: Black
- Eye color: Black
- Website: Official site

Miiko Morita (森田 美位子, Morita Mīko, born February 12, 1987 in Hyōgo Prefecture, Japan) is a former Japanese gravure idol, actress and television personality known for her role as Sayaka Honiden in the 2012 Super Sentai parody series Unofficial Sentai Akibaranger. She is formerly affiliated with Biscuit Entertainment, a subsidiary of Watanabe Entertainment.

== Filmography ==
=== Television ===
- Kore Kara (2007)
- Hiruobi! (2010)
- Quiz Present Variety Q-sama! (2011)
- Unofficial Sentai Akibaranger as Sayaka Honiden (2012)

=== DVD ===
- Mīko tayori 〜 kisaragi hitori tabi 〜 (みいこ便り〜如月ひとり旅〜) (2011)
- Mīko tayori 〜 fumidzuki naraigoto no tabi 〜 (みいこ便り〜文月・習い事の旅〜) (2011)
