= Danceroid =

Japanese dance group

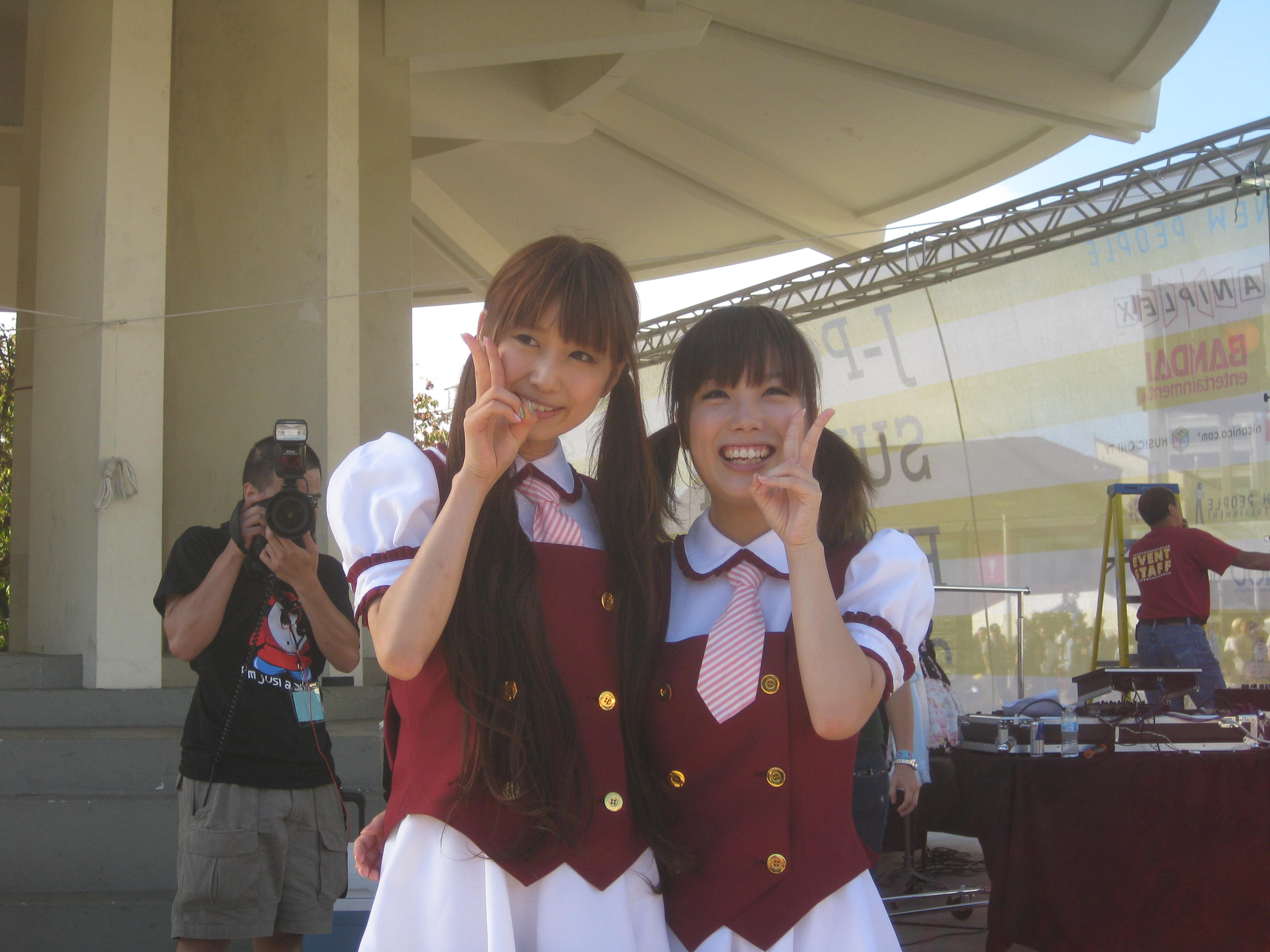
- Danceroid at J-Pop Summit Festival 2011

Background information
- Origin: Japan
- Genres: J-pop; dance-pop
- Years active: 2009 – 2014
- Labels: HEARTFULL ENTERTAINMENT; T-INFINITY ENTERTAINMENT
- Members: Ikura (leader); Yuzuki; Maam; Motomiya Marie; Satsuki; Yakko; Manaco
- Past members: Minka Lee; Coco; Kozue Aikawa
- Website: web.archive.org/web/*/danceroid.jp (see dates 2009-2015)

Danceroid (stylized as DANCEROID) was a Japanese female net idol dance group affiliated with Beautiful Group talent agency. They were formed in October 2009 when they posted a video of themselves dancing to a Vocaloid song on the Nico Nico Community Group. On July 26, 2014, DANCEROID disbanded as per the wishes of the current members. This was announced on the front page of their official website, as the contracts for all the members will lapse on this date.

== Members ==
- Ikura (いとくとら, Itokutora; born August 28, 1989) (2009–2014): Leader
- Maam (まぁむ, Maamu; born December 9, 1989) (2011–2014)
- Yuzuki (柚姫, Yuzuki; born July 18, 1991) (2011–2014)
- Marie Motomiya (本宮麻里絵, Motomiya Marie; born April 26, 1991) (2012–2014)
- Satsuki (さつき, Satsuki; born October 16, 1994) (2012–2014)
- Yakko (やっこ, Yakko; born September 28, 1995) (2012–2014)
- Manako (まなこ, Manako; born March 3, 1996) (2012–2014)
- Kozue Aikawa (愛川 こずえ, Aikawa Kozue; born October 25, 1991) (2009-2012)
- Minka Lee (ミンカ・リー, Minka Rī; born November 11) (2009-2011)
- Coco (ここ, Koko; born February 14) (2010-2011)

== History ==
Danceroid started in 2009 with Ikura, Kozue Aikawa, and Minka Lee. On December 29 of that year, they released their self-titled debut DVD. In 2010, after Minka left the group, Coco, Maam and Yuzuki won auditions to become new members. After Coco left the group in 2011, Danceroid continued to perform as a quartet.

In 2012, Aikawa starred as the clumsy café maid Kozu Kozu in the Super Sentai parody series Unofficial Sentai Akibaranger. Ikura and the other members have also appeared in some episodes of the series.

On June 3, 2012, Aikawa announced that she would leave Danceroid at the end of August, due to her physical condition making it hard to participate in Danceroid activities. Aikawa officially graduated from Danceroid at a live performance at Nicofarre in Roppongi, Tokyo, on September 1, 2012, broadcast online on Nico Nico Douga.

With Aikawa's graduation, Ikura is the only remaining founding member still active in Danceroid. After Aikawa's graduation, 3rd generation auditions were held, which the current three members participated in. Fans voted for several days, while Ikura, Maam, and Yuzuki were able to keep their places as members and on November 17, 2012, Motomiya Marie, Satsuki, Yakko, and Manako won auditions to become 3rd generation members. They left Heartfull Entertainment and joined T-INFINITY ENTERTAINMENT and released "DANCEROID LIVE DVD～Girls Be Ambitious!～".

On April 27, 2013, they released their first single "Dancing Day, Dancing Night" internationally on the iTunes Store.

On July 26, 2014, they decided to disband.

On October 24, 2014, Ikura, Maam, Yuzuki, Yakko, and Manako started a new idol group called Q'ulle. They disbanded in June 2020.

In 2018, Yuzuki joined forces with the melodic death metal band Blood Stain Child and created the supergroup Yuzukingdom. They have released 2 studio albums, 1 single, 1 EP and 5 music video's so far.

As of 2021, Yakko and Manako are active as freelance dancers.

== Choreographers ==
- MTP Yumiko (Megu Megu ☆ Fire Endless Night, Jounetsu wo Upload, HAKUMEI, China Cyber -@Wo Ai Ni, Poker Face, Twinkle×Twinkle, Shakariki Only One, Distorted Princess, Girls be Ambitious!, Emo Love, galaxias!)
- Junko☆ from GALAXXXXXY★ (BOY MEETS GIRL, Crazy ∞ nighT, EZ DO DANCE)
- Melochin (Baby Maniacs, Super Nuko World)
- BoopBoopBeeDoop (Dream Meltic Halloween)
- Kozue (FirstKiss!, Lily Lily ★ Burning Night)
- Ikura (Miracle∞Hinacle)
- Ikura, Kozue, Maam and Yuzuki (IA IA ★ Night of Desire)
- Manako (Kami no Manimani)

== Discography ==
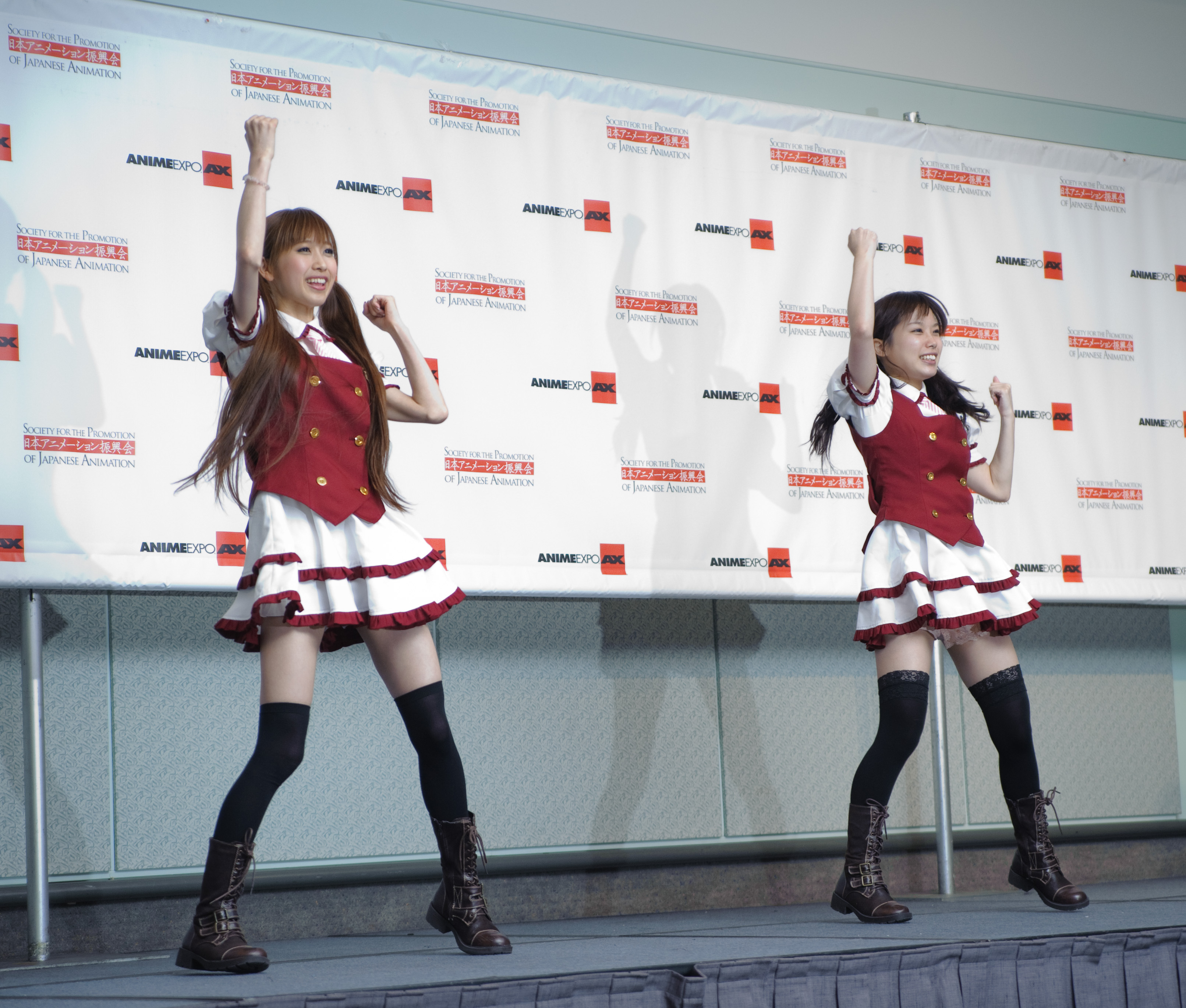
Danceroid performing at Anime Expo 2011

=== DVD ===
- DANCEROID 1st DVD (December 29, 2009)
- DANCEROID 2nd DVD (April 16, 2011)
- DANCEROID 3rd DVD (April 16, 2011)
- DANCEROID LIVE DVD～Girls Be Ambitious!～ (June 3, 2012)

=== CD ===
- Danceroid: Official Sound Track (April 16, 2011)

=== Single ===
- Dancing Day, Dancing Night (April 27, 2013)

=== Compilation ===
- Anime House Best Mix featuring Danceroid (November 24, 2010)

== Appearances ==
=== TV ===
- Hanamaru Market (2010)
- Unofficial Sentai Akibaranger (2012)
- Unofficial Sentai Akibaranger: Season 2 (2013)
