= Earth Maiden Arjuna =

Japanese anime television series

- Arjuna
- Key visual

地球少女アルジュナ (Chikyū Shōjo Arujuna)
- Genre: Magical girl; Philosophical; Science fiction
- Created by: Shōji Kawamori
- Anime television series
- Directed by: Shōji Kawamori
- Produced by: Fukashi Azuma; Hidenori Itahashi; Minoru Takanashi; Atsushi Yukawa
- Written by: Hiroshi Ōnogi; Shōji Kawamori
- Music by: Yoko Kanno
- Studio: Satelight
- Licensed by: NA: Bandai Entertainment
- Original network: TXN (TV Tokyo)
- Original run: January 9, 2001 – March 27, 2001
- Episodes: 12 + DVD Special
- icon

Arjuna (地球少女アルジュナ, Chikyū Shōjo Arujuna; lit. 'Earth Maiden Arjuna') is a Japanese anime television series created by Shoji Kawamori. The series follows Juna Ariyoshi, a high school girl chosen to be the "Avatar of Time" and entrusted with saving the dying Earth. Arjuna aired for 12 episodes on TV Tokyo from January to March 2001. The DVD release ("Arjuna: Director's Cut") featured remastered video and sound, and a previously unbroadcast "Chapter 9".

== Plot ==
The story opens with Juna telling her boyfriend Tokio that she feels too cramped in the city, and deciding to take a trip to the Sea of Japan. On the drive, they get in an accident caused by a large, invisible worm-like creature and Juna dies. As her spirit leaves her body, Juna sees the dying Earth. The planet's suffering is visualized by worm-like creatures similar to the one that caused the accident that killed her. Known as the Raaja, they vary in size, from microscopic bacteria to those entwining the planet. A young boy named Chris appears before Juna and offers to save her life if she will help the planet. She reluctantly agrees and is resurrected. Supported by Chris, Tokio and SEED, an international organization that monitors the environment and confronts the Raaja, Juna must use her new powers to stop the Raaja from destroying Earth through humankind's destruction of the environmental systems of the planet, and Chris can only hope that she can fully awaken her powers in time to save the world.

Near the end of the series, Chris is revealed to be responsible for using a spillage of genetically engineered decomposition bacteria to summon Raajas that ravage Japan, causing everything including their modern clothes, gadgets, accessories, as well as food, water and electricity, to all be destroyed. All the people are thus forced to wear traditional Japanese clothes, and others become sick due to starvation and dehydration. This forces Juna to fight Chris and the Raajas for the sake of the people that she cares about when SEED tries to take her to safety. It is during this time that she finally understands how to fully awaken her powers, and saves everyone. When Chris is defeated and after realizing his mistakes, he dies and disappears. Juna, satisfied to see her friends and her boyfriend Tokio one last time before dying for the second time tells them to eat the Raaja, and Tokio discovers that the Raajas that she defeated were made by food and water nutrients as he grabs one, stating that they can survive to live once more.

== Characters ==
Juna Ariyoshi (有吉 樹奈, Ariyoshi Juna)
Voiced by: Mami Higashiyama (Japanese); Maggie Blue O'Hara (English)
A girl in the tenth grade, who is recognized by Chris to be the "Avatar of Time", to save the planet. A magatama bead embedded in her forehead symbolizes her powers. Besides possessing powers due to her "Earth sympathy", she is an ordinary teenage girl. She has a difficult time understanding her purpose, and is unsure how she is supposed to help the planet. Her personal life is also distressed, both with her mother and sister, and especially in her uncertain relationship with Tokio, whose thoughts she cannot figure out, and who similarly never manages to understand her feelings. While she attempts to succeed in her job, she cannot understand the message Chris is trying to explain until the very end, when she realizes the meaning of "becoming one with the target" that she repeats from the beginning of the series.
Chris Hawken (クリス·ホーケン, Kurisu Hōken)
Voiced by: Yūji Ueda (Japanese); Brad Swaile (English)
A powerful entity who appears in the body of a young boy. His efforts to revive Juna left him crippled, but he can still leave his body when the situation demands it. He is unerringly kind and patient with everyone, including Juna, despite her misunderstanding his words. He repeatedly admonishes Juna for trying to fight the Raaja ("Why do you kill?"), claiming he never asked her to do so.
Cindy Klein (シンディ·クライン, Shindi Kurain)
Voiced by: Mayumi Shintani (Japanese); Brittney Irvin (English)
A young orphan whom Chris rescued, leading to her unwavering devotion to him. She is a telepath who acts as Chris' translator. She seems to take an immediate dislike to Juna; she is arrogant and rude towards her and says negative things about her even when she's not around. This is presumably because she feels that Chris's crippled condition is Juna's fault.
Tokio Oshima (大島 時夫, Ōshima Tokio)
Voiced by: Tomokazu Seki (Japanese); Andrew Francis (English)
A normal teenage boy, addicted to video games and fast food. He is greatly concerned with Juna's safety, not realizing he is powerless to protect her from the forces she must face. Though Tokio is witness to Juna's tribulations, he cannot fathom what she is going through. Though he doesn't understand Juna's situation, he is very patient and does his best to help and protect her, even in the face of a Raaja attack.
Sayuri Shirakawa (白河 さゆり, Shirakawa Sayuri)
Voiced by: Aya Hisakawa (Japanese); Tabitha St. Germain (English)
A classmate and friend to Juna and Tokio. She knows nothing of Juna's role as savior, but tries to help her deal with what she sees as nothing more than emotions from her confusing personal life. Although she never says it directly, it is very obvious that Sayuri is greatly infatuated with Tokio, even though Juna, her best friend, is dating Tokio. She tries to fight her own feelings, swinging between pushing Tokio away by setting him and Juna up, and raging at Juna for not appreciating his kindness. With Juna absent off fighting Raaja, Sayuri can't help herself from moving in on Tokio, but Tokio's response to her is minimal.
Teresa Wong (ウォンテレサ)
Voiced by: (Japanese); Samantha Ferris (English)
A member of SEED.
Bob (ボブ)
Voiced by: (Japanese); Trevor Devall (English)
Yukari Shirakawa (白河 アップ, Shirakawa Yukari)
Voiced by: (Japanese); Brenna O'Brien (English)
Sayuri's little sister.
Kimitoshi Shirakawa (白河 君とし, Shirakawa Kimitoshi)
Voiced by: (Japanese); Danny McKinnon (English)
Sayuri's little brother.
Sakurai (桜井)
Voiced by: (Japanese); Michael Dobson (English)
Juna's math teacher.
Mr. Oshima (大島さん, Ōshima-san)
Voiced by: (Japanese); John Novak (English)
Tokio's father.
Dojima (渡島)
Voiced by: (Japanese); Ron Halder (English)
Mizuho Oshima (大島 みずほ, Ōshima Mizuho)
Voiced by: (Japanese); Nicole Oliver (English)
Tokio's stepmother.
Hiroshi Shirakawa (白河 ヒロシ, Shirakawa Hiroshi)
Voiced by: (Japanese); Ward Perry (English)
Sayuri's father. He dies during the Raaja outbreak.
Kaine Ariyoshi (有吉 ケイン, Ariyoshi Kaine)
Voiced by: (Japanese); Alaina Burnett (English)
Juna's older sister, who becomes pregnant more than halfway through the series.
Junko Ariyoshi (有吉 ジュンコ, Ariyoshi Junko)
Voiced by: (Japanese); Fiona Hogan (English)
Juna's mother.
Masaharu Ariyoshi (有吉 雅治, Ariyoshi Masaharu)
Voiced by: (Japanese); Eli Gabay (English)
Juna's estranged father.

== Themes ==
As is clear from the title, Arjuna, the series is highly influenced by Hinduism, as well as Indian culture in general. The story was inspired by the Bhagavad Gita, most notably in the character of Chris, who is modeled after Krishna. Note that the series is set in a pantheistic vision in which it emphasizes the connection between all elements of the Earth. In episode two, Chris's chakras are shown on the monitor screen which are also adapted from the Hindu concept of seven chakras inside the human body. The antagonistic "Raaja" (while mispronounced in the anime) refer to "Roga" the "disease" caused by the wound on earth itself. Arjuna's bow, "Gandiva", is the real name of bow used in Mahabharata by Arjun and her mechanical guardian "Ashura" is based on the "Asura" spirits of Hinduism.

The setting for the show, Kobe, was chosen by creator Shoji Kawamori for his personal fondness of it, and the city itself plays a prominent role, with famous buildings such as the Kobe Meriken Park Oriental Hotel and nearby Ferris wheel showing up as common backdrops. The idea of living in a city is a main theme, with both Juna and the Raaja rebelling against how removed from nature modern life is. An idea which Kawamori presents, although in a problematic and sometimes contradictory form, is natural farming. Not to be confused with the mere absence of chemicals that is often meant by "organic farming", natural farming involves letting nature grow as it will, not removing weeds or bugs, or using any fertilizer. The old man Juna encounters in episode four explains the need for this return to nature in order to sustain life in the long term, a sentiment matured by the creator during his Asian journeys (not only India, but Nepal and other countries as well).

Another theme of the show is that of the disconnection between emotions, thoughts, words, and actions. The author himself introduced the work, back in the late year 2000, by declaring in an interview "[...we] live fragmented lifestyles that eat away at our future. That is why I created a character that can truly see the world as it is." In episode seven, "Invisible Words", Juna is able to read the words in the minds of everyone around her, yet still cannot understand their intentions. She sees in Tokio's mind that he has been asking Saiyuri about a ring, and assumes that he has been cheating on her, when in fact the ring had been for her. Juna and Tokio's feelings never reach each other successfully. In episode eight, while talking on the phone, Juna finds her spirit in the room with Tokio. But despite her even embracing him, he has no understanding when she tries to say that she is with him. At the same time, Tokio actually says he loves Juna for the first time, even though he is at the same moment not feeling her love at all. This idea is later visualized in episode 10, when Tokio is having an argument with his father. Juna is able to "see" their angered thoughts flying at each other, and entirely missing, neither of them hearing or understanding the other.

== Media ==
=== Episodes ===
| No. | Title | Directed by | Written by | Original release date |
|---|---|---|---|---|
| 1 | "The Drop of Time"; Transliteration: "Toki no shizuku" (Japanese: 時のしずく) | Hidekazu Satō | Shōji Kawamori | January 9, 2001 |
| 2 | "The Blue Light"; Transliteration: "Aoi hikari" (Japanese: 青い光) | Yutaka Yamahata | Shōji Kawamori | January 16, 2001 |
| 3 | "Tears of the Forest"; Transliteration: "Mori no namida" (Japanese: 森の涙) | Yūsuke Yamamoto | Hiroshi Ōnogi | January 23, 2001 |
| 4 | "Transmigration"; Transliteration: "Tensei rinne" (Japanese: 転生輪廻) | Norio Matsumoto; Shōji Kawamori | Shōji Kawamori | January 30, 2001 |
| 5 | "The Small Voices"; Transliteration: "Chisaki mono no koe" (Japanese: 小さきものの声) | Hidekazu Satō; Hiroyuki Tsuchiya | Hidekazu Satō; Hiroshi Ōnogi | February 6, 2001 |
| 6 | "The First One"; Transliteration: "Hajime no hitori" (Japanese: はじめの一人) | Yasuyuki Shimizu | Hiroshi Ōnogi | February 13, 2001 |
| 7 | "The Invisible Words"; Transliteration: "Mienai kotoba" (Japanese: 見えない言葉) | Atsushi Yano; Kazuo Takigawa | Hiroshi Ōnogi | February 20, 2001 |
| 8 | "The Distant Rain"; Transliteration: "Toi ame" (Japanese: とおい雨) | Tomokazu Tokoro | Hiroshi Ōnogi | February 27, 2001 |
| 9 | "Before Birth"; Transliteration: "Umareru mae kara" (Japanese: 生れる前から) | Takahiro Omori | Shōji Kawamori | October 25, 2001 (DVD Volume 4) |
| 10 | "The Flickering Genes"; Transliteration: "Yuragu idenshi" (Japanese: ゆらぐ遺伝子) | Masato Kitagawa | Kazuharu Satō | March 6, 2001 |
| 11 | "The Day of No Return"; Transliteration: "Kaerazaru hi" (Japanese: かえらざる日) | Kenichi Takeshita | Hiroshi Ōnogi; Shōji Kawamori; Hidekazu Satō | March 13, 2001 |
| 12 | "The Death of a Nation"; Transliteration: "Kuni horobite" (Japanese: 国ほろびて) | Yoshitaka Fujimoto | Hiroshi Ōnogi; Shōji Kawamori | March 20, 2001 |
| 13 | "The Here and Now"; Transliteration: "Ima" (Japanese: 今) | Tomokazu Tokoro; Yūsuke Yamamoto; Ichirō Itano | Shōji Kawamori | March 27, 2001 |

=== Music ===
The anime's score was composed by Yoko Kanno. Director Shoji Kawamori says he instructed Kanno that the music was supposed to sound feminine, despite some of its use in action scenes. She used Indian music as a partial inspiration which matched that of the show. Other tracks are more experimental and otherworldly. The vocals were done by Gabriela Robin, Maaya Sakamoto, and Chinatsu Yamamoto. The soundtrack was released on the CD's Arjuna: Into the Another World and Onna no Minato.

==== Arjuna: Into the Another World ====
Arjuna: Into the Another World

Soundtrack album by Yoko Kanno
- Length: 66:51
- Label: Geneon
- Producer: Yoko Kanno

1. Early Bird (2:09)
2. Awakening (7:57)
3. Clóe (3:19)
4. Time to Die (2:51)
5. 2nd Life (3:05)
6. Diving (2:37)
7. The Clone (2:05)
8. Feel the Circle (1:36)
9. Aerobics (3:23)
10. Omega Blue (2:47)
11. A Drop of Time (0:51)
12. Resonance of the Earth (1:57)
13. Prophet (4:07)
14. Before Breakfast (1:15)
15. Bells for Her (2:02)
16. Motorcycle (5:11)
17. Diamond (1:23)
18. Mameshiba (6:09)
19. Kuuki to Hoshi (Air and Stars) (1:08)
20. Aqua (6:29)
21. Mameshiba (instrumental version)

=== Onna no Minato ===
Onna no Minato

Soundtrack album by Yoko Kanno
- Released: 23 May 2001
- Length: 39:54

1. Gold Fish - 1:58
2. Enka - 3:05
3. Mawaru Spoke - 3:19
4. Butter Sea - 3:42
5. Veggie - 1:36
6. Shizukana Seikatsu - 2:27
7. Didn't It Rain - 2:35
8. Sanctuary - 2:33
9. Girl with Power - 4:51
10. Asura Jittaika - 2:49
11. Teresa - 2:42
12. One - 4:15
13. Saigo no Mameshiba - 3:10
14. Appare Genki Theme - 0:26

== Reception ==
Earth Maiden Arjuna was one of the Jury Recommended Works at the 5th Japan Media Arts Festival in 2001.
