= GoGo Sentai Boukenger =

Japanese tokusatsu television series

- Genre: Tokusatsu; Superhero fiction Comedy; Drama; Adventure; Science fantasy
- Created by: Toei Company
- Written by: Shō Aikawa; Naruhisa Arakawa; Yasuko Kobayashi; Akatsuki Yamatoya; Junki Takegami
- Directed by: Satoshi Morota; Shojiro Nakazawa; Noboru Takemoto; Tarou Sakamoto; Nobuhiro Suzumura; Katsuya Watanabe
- Starring: Mitsuomi Takahashi; Yasuka Saitoh; Masashi Mikami; Chise Nakamura; Haruka Suenaga; Masayuki Deai; Shigeru Saiki; Hiroo Otaka; Junpei Morita; Mami Yamasaki
- Voices of: Nobuo Tanaka; Hideyuki Hori; Banjō Ginga; Takaya Kuroda; Kenta Miyake; Chihiro Suzuki
- Narrated by: Shinichirō Ōta
- Opening theme: "GoGo Sentai Boukenger" by NoB
- Ending theme: "Boukensha ON THE ROAD" by Psychic Lover
- Composer: Kōtarō Nakagawa
- Country of origin: Japan
- No. of episodes: 49 (list of episodes)

Production
- Producers: Hedwig Schreck; Jun Hikasa; Takaaki Utsunomiya; Kōichi Yada; Masashi Yagi
- Production locations: Tokyo, Japan (Greater Tokyo Area)
- Running time: 30 minutes
- Production companies: TV Asahi; Toei Company; Toei Agency

Original release
- Network: ANN (TV Asahi)
- Release: February 19, 2006 – February 11, 2007

Related
- Mahō Sentai Magiranger; Juken Sentai Gekiranger

GoGo Sentai Boukenger (轟轟戦隊ボウケンジャー, Gōgō Sentai Bōkenjā; Rumbling Squadron Boukenger) (Note: Gōgō (轟轟) literally translates as "Rumbling".) (Note: "Boukenger" (ボウケンジャー, Bōkenjā) comes from the Japanese word for "adventurer" (冒険者, Bōkensha), and is a portmanteau of "Adventure" (冒険, Bōken) and "Ranger" (レンジャー, Renjā).) is the 30th series in Toei's Super Sentai series, a metaseries of Japanese tokusatsu programming and celebrated the franchise's 30th anniversary. It was the first installment to be produced and broadcast in the 16:9 aspect ratio. It aired from February 19, 2006, to February 11, 2007, and was replaced by Juken Sentai Gekiranger. Its footage was used in the American series, Power Rangers Operation Overdrive and was dubbed into Korean for the South Korean market, airing there as Power Rangers Treasure Force.

== Plot summary ==
Powerful relics known as the Precious appear throughout the world. Noticing these relics' power, various Negative Syndicates wish to take the Precious for themselves and use them for evil ends. To make sure that the Precious do not fall into the hands of the Negative Syndicates, the Search Guard Successor Foundation (SGS) has developed its own special operations team, the Boukengers, whose mission is to collect the Precious and thwart the Negative Syndicates.

== Characters ==
=== SGS ===
The Boukengers transformed (and Great Sword Man Zubaan on the far left). From left to right: Masumi Inou, Natsuki Mamiya, Eiji Takaoka, Satoru Akashi, Sakura Nishihori, and Souta Mogami.

The Search Guard Successor Foundation (サージェス財団, Sājesu Zaidan; SGS) collects artifacts known as Precious (プレシャス, Pureshasu) with help from the eponymous Boukengers. They are led by Mister Voice (ミスター・ボイス, Misutā Boisu), who serves as a liaison to the main SGS headquarters, and assisted by Morio Makino (牧野 森男, Makino Morio), who is the technical specialist of SGS and creator of the Boukengers' GoGo Vehicle (ゴーゴービークル, GōGō Bīkuru) mecha.

Each primary member carries an Accellular (アクセルラー, Akuserurā) cellphone as their transformation device along with a Survi-Buster (サバイバスター, Sabaibasutā) handgun, which can be reconfigured into the Survi-Blade (サバイブレード, Sabaiburēdo) sword, and a multipurpose Scope Shot (スコープショット, Sukōpu Shotto) device, which can combine with a Survi-Buster to access the latter's Sniper Mode (スナイパーモード, Sunaipā Mōdo), as their sidearms. Any one of them can also be equipped with the Accel Tector (アクセルテクター, Akuseru Tekutā) armor to wield the Dual Crusher (デュアルクラッシャー, Dyuaru Kurashā), which can switch between its Mixer Head (ミキサーヘッド, Mikisā Heddo) and Drill Head (ドリルヘッド, Doriru Heddo) modes.

Satoru Akashi (明石 暁, Akashi Satoru)
Satoru leads the team with a calm expression and a fire in his heart. He mostly battles Ryuuwon.

As the "Fiery Adventurer" (熱き冒険者, Atsuki Bōkensha), Bouken Red (ボウケンレッド, Bōken Reddo), Satoru wields the Bouken Bo (ボウケンボー, Bōken Bō), which can be reconfigured into the Bouken Javelin (ボウケンジャベリン, Bōken Jaberin). His personal GoGo Vehicles are GoGo Dump (ゴーゴーダンプ, Gōgō Danpu), GoGo Jet (ゴーゴージェット, GōGō Jetto), and GoGo Commander (ゴーゴーコマンダー, GōGō Komandā).

Masumi Inou (伊能 真墨, Inō Masumi)
Masumi is only part of the Boukengers to repay his debt to Satoru for saving his life. He has a personal vendetta against Dark Shadow member Yaiba of Darkness (闇のヤイバ, Yami no Yaiba).

As the "Fast Adventurer" (迅き冒険者, Hayaki Bōkensha), Bouken Black (ボウケンブラック, Bōken Burakku), Masumi wields the Radial Hammer (ラジアルハンマー, Rajiaru Hanmā). His personal GoGo Vehicles are GoGo Formula (ゴーゴーフォーミュラ, Gōgō Fōmyura), GoGo Crane (ゴーゴークレーン, GōGō Kurēn), and GoGo Carrier (ゴーゴーキャリアー, GōGō Kyariā).

Souta Mogami (最上 蒼太, Mogami Sōta)
Souta serves as the team's information specialist. He mostly battles Dark Shadow member Shizuka of the Wind (風のシズカ, Kaze no Shizuka).

As the "High-Up Adventurer" (高き冒険者, Takaki Bōkensha), Bouken Blue (ボウケンブルー, Bōken Burū), Souta wields the Blow Knuckle (ブロウナックル, Burō Nakkuru). His personal GoGo Vehicles are GoGo Gyro (ゴーゴージャイロ, Gōgō Jairo), GoGo Mixer (ゴーゴーミキサー, GōGō Mikisā), and GoGo Fighter (ゴーゴーファイター, GōGō Faitā).

Natsuki Mamiya (間宮 菜月, Mamiya Natsuki)
Natsuki is the most childish of the group. Her main reason for adventuring is to discover more about her past. It is later revealed that she is the last survivor of the Lemurian civilization. Her parents named her Lilina (リリナ, Ririna).

As the "Strong Adventurer" (強き冒険者, Tsuyoki Bōkensha), Bouken Yellow (ボウケンイエロー, Bōken Ierō), Natsuki dual wields the twin Bucket Scoopers (バケットスクーパー, Baketto Sukūpā). Her personal GoGo Vehicles are GoGo Dozer (ゴーゴードーザー, Gōgō Dōzā), GoGo Drill (ゴーゴードリル, GōGō Doriru), and GoGo Attacker (ゴーゴーアタッカー, GōGō Atakkā).

Sakura Nishihori (西堀 さくら, Nishihori Sakura)
Sakura is the most serious member when it comes to working. She often appears to be cold and emotionless, but cares for her teammates.
As the "Deep Adventurer" (深き冒険者, Fukaki Bōkensha), Bouken Pink (ボウケンピンク, Bōken Pinku), Sakura wields the Hydro Shooter (ハイドロシューター, Haidoro Shūtā). Her personal GoGo Vehicles are GoGo Marine (ゴーゴーマリン, Gōgō Marin), GoGo Shovel (ゴーゴーショベル, GōGō Shoberu), and GoGo Roader (ゴーゴーローダー, GōGō Rōdā).

Eiji Takaoka (高丘 映士, Takaoka Eiji)
Eiji is spiritually the strongest member of the team because his father, the Ashu Watcher Karato, married an Ashu named Kei, thus making him half-Ashu. He mostly battles Gai (as either form) due to their bitter history. In GoGo Sentai Boukenger vs. Super Sentai, he embodies the Spirit of Hope.

As the "Dazzling Adventurer" (眩き冒険者, Mabayuki Bōkensha), Bouken Silver (ボウケンシルバー, Bōken Shirubā), Eiji utilizes the GoGo Changer (冒険ブレス ゴーゴーチェンジャー, Gōgō Chenjā) bracelet to transform. He also wields the Sagasniper (サガスナイパー, Sagasunaipā) sidearm, which can be reconfigured into either the Sagaspear (サガスピア, Sagasupia) or the latter's metal detector-like Sagasu Mode (サガスモード, Sagasu Mōdo). His personal GoGo Vehicles are GoGo Fire (ゴーゴーファイヤー, GōGō Faiyā), GoGo Aider (ゴーゴーエイダー, GōGō Eidā), and GoGo Police (ゴーゴーポリス, GōGō Porisu).

=== Allies ===
Kyoko (キョウコ, Kyōko)
One of Satoru's ex-partners who went on an expedition with him years before. Portrayed by Miki Handa (繁田 美貴, Handa Miki).
Shiro Masaki (柾木 紫郎, Masaki Shirō)
One of Satoru's ex-partners who went on an expedition with him years before. Portrayed by Yusuke Murakami (村上 裕亮, Murakami Yūsuke).
Phantom Thief Selene (怪盗セレネー, Kaitō Serenē)
She had been seeking the treasures from The Tale of the Bamboo Cutter, crossing the Jaryuu Clan while getting her fourth treasure, the Dragon's Neck Orb. She could have been Princess Kaguya herself.
Magi (マギ)
An elder from the Water Metropolis who didn't want to see any more of his people perish in the search for the Aqua Crystal.
Ragi (ラギ)
Magi's apprentice. Once a "Water human", he intended to finish what his father started to restore the Water Metropolis. He sacrificed his humanity to survive without water by discarding the "Proof of Water" crystal on his tiara (which Ryuuwon crushed) and was transformed into a Wicked Dragon by Ryuuwon, who used him to find the Aqua Crystal. Ragi's Wicked Dragon form's design is based on Bakuryū Sentai Abaranger's Bachycelonagurus.
Karato Takaoka (高丘 漢人, Takaoka Karato)
Eiji's father who was killed fighting Gai.
Kei (ケイ)
The only female Ashu and Eiji's mother as a result of her and Karato's sharing of forbidden love.
Yuji Toba (鳥羽 祐二, Toba Yūji)
Souta's ex-partner from his times as a spy.
Kouichi Akashi (明石 虹一, Akashi Kōichi)
Satoru's father and a legendary UMA hunter. Portrayed by Yasuaki Kurata (倉田 保昭, Kurata Yasuaki).
Hanzou Igarashi (五十嵐 半蔵, Igarashi Hanzō)
An archeologist known as the only known researcher of the most ancient civilization known, Lemuria (レムリア, Remuria), as well as one of the only two men who can read Lemurian. Despises SGS for its "ambition", and treasure hunters because of the destruction of many ruins at their hands in search of Precious. Portrayed by Mansaku Fuwa (不破 万作, Fuwa Mansaku).
Kousuke Shimada (島田 浩介, Shimada Kōsuke)
A last-in-everything who was accepted in the Adventurer School after he was mistaken for Satoru. In class, he was always a target of Shirubegami's Chalk Attack as he was always screwing up.
Taro (太郎, Tarō)
A mysterious boy who was born from a giant peach Satoru and Eiji find in a river. The boy develops at an incredible speed growing in one day what a normal human would grow in 10 years. It is later revealed that he was sent by the mountain in which the Mountain-Crushing Kanabō was hidden to recover it. Although he is a coward, Taro still tries to take back the Precious. He eventually gathers courage from Satoru and Eiji to stand against the Questers. He is based upon the Japanese legend of Momotarō.
Miyu (未夢)
A mysterious girl who claims to have been kissed and hugged by Souta and wants him to be with her. Souta does not remember her, but she insists that he was very kind to her. It is later revealed that she is actually a cat which by means of a piece of the Rainbow Cloth, transformed into a human to thank Souta for helping her fix her leg. Portrayed by Mizuho Hata (秦 みずほ, Hata Mizuho).
Eve (イヴ, Ivu)
A young girl Satoru met and who claims to be Santa Claus. She is attacked by Gajah to obtain the Golem, a Precious capable of destroying a large city. However, it turns out that Eve irresponsibly gave the Golem in its doll form to a boy named Kiyoshi much to Satoru's annoyance while they were on a "date" to find Golem. but Gajah found it first, reviving Golem to attack the Boukengers with then enlarged itself. When the battle against the Golem seemed lost, Eve remembered the way to defeat it and revealed it to the Boukengers. She later thanks the Boukenger for helping her, promising another date with Satoru, and she flies away on her reindeer-drawn sleigh. Portrayed by Rina Akiyama (秋山 莉奈, Akiyama Rina).
Aka Red (アカレッド, Aka Reddo)
The embodiment of all the past red Sentai warriors who gives Eiji the Super Sentai Address Book to find older Sentai members to fight Chronos. Voiced by Tōru Furuya (古谷 徹, Furuya Tōru).
Past Sentai Warriors
They appeared in GoGo Sentai Boukenger vs. Super Sentai, much like the Dream Sentai in Hyakujuu Sentai Gaoranger vs. Super Sentai. Along with Eiji, they embody the "6 Sentai Spirits".

Nanami Nano/Hurricane Blue (野乃 七海／ハリケンブルー, Nono Nanami/Hariken Burū)
A kunoichi and a member of the Ninpuu Sentai Hurricaneger who is currently a pop star. She embodies the Spirit of Friendship.
Asuka/Abare Black (アスカ／アバレブラック, Asuka/Abare Burakku)
A resident of Dino Earth and a member of the Bakuryū Sentai Abaranger who gave his team the power to fight the Evolien menace. He embodies the Spirit of Passion.
Tekkan "Tetsu" Aira/Deka Break (姶良 "テツ" 鉄幹／デカブレイク, Aira "Tetsu" Tekkan/Deka Bureiku)
A super-elite member of the Tokusou Sentai Dekaranger who learned the true meaning of justice from his "mentor" Banban "Ban" Akaza of the Earth-branch SPD, to whom Tetsu had himself assigned. He embodies the Spirit of Justice.
Tsubasa Ozu/Magi Yellow (小津 翼／マジイエロー, Ozu Tsubasa/Maji Ierō)
The Ozu family's fourth child and a member of the Mahō Sentai Magiranger whose specialties are potions and the element of thunder. He embodies the Spirit of Courage.
Hikaru/Magi Shine (ヒカル／マジシャイン, Hikaru/Maji Shain)
Tsubasa's brother-in-law who taught him and his siblings the true potential of magic, and also fought by their side while marrying Tsubasa's sister Urara. He embodies the Spirit of Love.

Juken Sentai Gekiranger
A group of martial artists with whom the Boukengers team up with in Juken Sentai Gekiranger vs. Boukenger.

=== Negative Syndicates ===
Not much is known about the Negative Syndicates (ネガティブシンジケート, Negatibu Shinjikēto) other than that they are individual organizations whose respective leaders, foot soldiers, and monsters try to steal the Precious and use them for evil deeds. Although there is some animosity between the member groups, they occasionally work together.

==== Gordom Civilization ====
The Gordom Civilization (ゴードム文明, Gōdomu Bunmei) is the first of the Negative Syndicates.

- High Priest Gajah (大神官ガジャ, Daishinkan Gaja): The sole survivor of the Gordom Civilization. He intends to restore Gordom its former glory by retrieving the Precious lost to them over the thousands of years they spent in slumber. Gordom was the first and last Negative the Boukengers had to deal with.
- The Combatant Curse (戦闘員カース, Sentōin Kāsu) are ash-colored stone beings that are the foot soldiers for the Gordom Civilization, summoned from stone. They wield torches that can change into sickles and have a noticeable healing factor, as Souta found out the hard way when he injured his hand punching one in the chest with full force. Fortunately, this healing factor cannot save them from those more powerful than they are. Both Dark Shadow and the Jyaryu Clan use Curse occasionally. The Curse's design is based on Chōriki Sentai Ohranger's Tackle Boy.

==== Jaryuu Clan ====
The Jaryuu Clan (ジャリュウ一族, Jaryū Ichizoku) are the second of the Negative Syndicates who seek to destroy mankind and make the Earth more suited to their reptilian bodies.

- Creator King Ryuuwon (創造王リュウオーン, Sōzōō Ryūōn): The leader of the Jaryuu Clan who was once human. Ryuuwon's design is based on Kyōryū Sentai Zyuranger's Daizyujin. Ryuuwon returned in episode 21 of Kaizoku Sentai Gokaiger episode 21.
- Dragonoid Soldier Jyaryu (竜人兵ジャリュウ, Ryūjinhei Jaryū; 2-49) are dragon-like warriors created by Ryuoon using his own blood and machinery. They wield swords and can summon hundreds of poisonous red lizards from their bodies. They are fewer in number when compared to the Curse, but more powerful. They are also capable of speech. The Jyaryu's design is based on Kyōryū Sentai Zyuranger's Dragon Caesar.

==== Dark Shadow ====
Dark Shadow (ダークシャドウ, Dāku Shadō; 3-49 & Gekiranger vs. Boukenger) is a stealth assassin group descended from the ninja order called the Society of Shadow (影の衆, Kage no Shū). They are experts in espionage that work to obtain the Precious for the highest bidder. Dark Shadow has no footsoldiers of its own, but Yaiba and Shizuka do utilize the Curse on several occasions. After Yaiba's betrayal and Gajya's final attack, Dark Shadow halted its actions and left the country. About half a year later, Gekko and Shizuka resumed their thieving ways again, not succeeding thanks to the Boukengers and getting involved in the Pachacamac XII incident.

- Gekko of Illusions (幻のゲッコウ, Maboroshi no Gekkō; 3-49) is the wise owl-like leader of Dark Shadow. He was originally the head of the Society of Shadow until he sacrificed himself to stop the Demon Bird (魔鳥, Machō), which appeared in the Hermit's Gorge centuries ago, bringing cataclysmic storm clouds in its wake. It was sealed by Gekko in exchange for his own body, fusing himself into the monster and sealing its power and soul in the Demon Bird's Magic Jewel, trapping himself in the monster's weakened body. He has the ability to create and enlarge Tsukumogami with sutras. He can also speak through the sutras as if they were hand radios.
- Yaiba of Darkness (闇のヤイバ, Yami no Yaiba; 3-46), nicknamed the "Paper Crane Ninja", is a ninja-like monster who believes that darkness is the most powerful force in existence. This armored warrior uses two ninja swords that can be combined into a double bladed naginata. Though he wears a facemask, it opens up to a terrifying monster-like face when he is about to kill, performing the "1000 Paper Crane Dark Blizzard" that summons a hail of deadly colorful origami cranes that repeatedly strike and slash the enemy. Yaiba used that attack to slay Masumi's abusive excavation group when Masumi himself was little, and since then a rivalry/grudge has grown between them. Yaiba also revealed to Masumi that he let him live that day because of the darkness in Masumi's heart when he used the excavation group as a shield.
- Shizuka of the Wind (風のシズカ, Kaze no Shizuka; 3-49 & Gekiranger vs. Boukenger) is a kunoichi who fights with a pair of kunai. She often refers to herself in third person, like Natsuki. Shizuka is very childish, rude, loudmouth and inept but also violent and deceiving and most of the time undergoes disguises to find any Precious, but the Boukengers can see through her disguises. She is the spokesperson of the Dark Shadow Company and often embarks in meetings to obtain Precious from clueless corporations, as well as selling them.

==== Questers ====
The Ashu Tribe (アシュ族, Ashu Zoku; 17-42) was apparently an unknown branch along the human evolution line. Each Ashu has a concentration of life force, namely a "soul", which gives it particular fighting abilities. Feared and hunted down as "yōkai" (demons) in ancient times due to their feline/gargoyle appearance, they were ultimately sealed within another dimension using the Hundred-Demons Mirror, only Gai and Hyoga remaining free. According to Mr. Voice, humans seeing the Ashu is what inspired the various monsters in myths. They first appeared in Task 17 to obtain the mirror to release their brethren. However, only Rei was freed before the mirror was shattered to keep the others from entering the human world. Eiji Takaoka, as a member of the Takaoka clan, has been fighting this group even before joining the SGS. After their first defeat at the hands of the Boukengers, Gajya uses his power to bind Gai's and Rei's souls to the world long enough to install his Gordom Engines into them. With the Gordom Engines in them, Gai and Rei formed new bodies for themselves and became Questers (クエスター, Kuesutā; 19-42), robotic-armored versions of themselves. The Questers possessed the ability to create wavelengths with the Gordom Engine, which interfere with the power of the Accel Suits' and GoGo Vehicles' Parallel Engine, and can melt into the ground.

- Furious Fiend Gai (怒りの鬼神ガイ, Ikari no Kishin Gai; 17-19) is the leader of the eastern Ashu Tribe who is a Chinese guardian lion-like demon who can conjure forth a bazooka-like weapon. Gai's Ashu soul is a "Fighting Soul" (闘魂, Tatakai Damashii). Gai is a brash and savage demon who loves to destroy, laughing at the sight of others suffering.
- Grand Beast Rei (大いなる獣レイ, Ōinaru Kemono Rei; 17-19) is the most evil of the Ashu. Rei's Ashu soul is a "Technique Soul" (術魂, Jutsu Damashii). Gai and Hyoga freed this powerful Bengal tiger-like demon from the Hundred-Demons Mirror by using the captured Natsuki's blood as sacrifice. Rei is a calm, yet vicious and calculating demon who loves to make people suffer. He has power over fire and can breathe forth an illusion-filled miasma that preys on the self-doubt of his victims.
- Hyoga (ヒョウガ, Hyōga; 17) is a cheetah-like Ashu with a large, icy crown-like horn that he can use to shoot lightning bolts. Hyoga's Ashu soul is a "Thunder Soul" (雷魂, Kaminari Damashii). With Gai, he kidnapped Natsuki and used her blood to free Rei from the Hundred-Demons Mirror. He is immensely loyal to his fellow Ashu.
- Ouga (オウガ, Ōga; 40 & 42) is the lynx-like king of the Western Ashu tribe, sealed long ago with the rest of his tribe. Ouga was sealed within the mountain by Eiji's ancestors until Rei released him. He seeks and intends to eliminate Eiji claiming that his mother, Kei, who Ouga knew since they were young, cannot complete her travel to the other world with Eiji, the living proof of her "sin", still alive.

== Episodes ==
1. The Heart of the Demon God (魔神の心臓, Majin no Shinzō)
2. The Dragon Thieves (竜の略奪者, Ryū no Ryakudatsu-sha)
3. The Champion's Blades (覇者の剣, Hasha no Tsurugi)
4. The Lost Vehicles (失われたビークル, Ushinawareta Bīkuru)
5. The Imperial Pearl (帝国の真珠, Teikoku no Shinju)
6. The Cursed Fog (呪いの霧, Noroi no Kiri)
7. The Salamander's Scale (火竜(サラマンダー)のウロコ, Saramandā no Uroko)
8. The Treasure of Atlantis (アトランティスの秘宝, Atorantisu no Hihō)
9. The Paper Crane Ninja (折鶴の忍者, Orizuru no Ninja)
10. Bouken Red Disappears (消えたボウケンレッド, Kieta Bōken Reddo)
11. The Showdown on the Isolated Island (孤島の決戦, Kotō no Kessen)
12. The Pipes of Hamelin (ハーメルンの笛, Hāmerun no Fue)
13. The Treasures of Princess Kaguya (かぐや姫の宝, Kaguya-hime no Takara)
14. The Revived Past (甦る過去, Yomigaeru Kako)
15. The Water Metropolis (水の都, Mizu no Miyako)
16. The Water Crystal (水のクリスタル, Mizu no Kurisutaru)
17. The Ashu Mirror (アシュの鏡, Ashu no Kagami)
18. The Man that Lived (生きていた男, Ikiteita Otoko)
19. The Dazzling Adventurer (眩き冒険者, Mabayuki Bōkensha)
20. A Brand-New Giant (新たなる巨人, Aratanaru Kyojin)
21. The Mallet of Uchide (打出の小槌, Uchide no Kozuchi)
22. The Ring of Solomon (ソロモンの指輪, Soromon no Yubiwa)
23. The Dangerous Partner (あぶない相棒, Abunai Aibō)
24. The Hatsune Drum (初音の鼓, Hatsune no Tsuzumi)
25. The Forbidden Fruit (禁断の果実, Kindan no Kajitsu)
26. The Glass Slipper (ガラスの靴, Garasu no Kutsu)
27. The Feng-Shui Trap (風水占いの罠, Fūsui Uranai no Wana)
28. The Legendary Armor (伝説の鎧, Densetsu no Yoroi)
29. The Golden Sword (黄金の剣, Ōgon no Ken)
30. The Rage of the Golden Majin (怒りの黄金魔人, Ikari no Ōgon Majin)
31. The Flame of the Ruined Country (亡国の炎, Bōkoku no Honō)
32. The Secret of the Adventure School (ボウケン学校の秘密, Bōken Gakkō no Himitsu)
33. The Sun of Lemuria (レムリアの太陽, Remuria no Taiyō)
34. The Distant Memories (遼かなる記憶, Harukanaru Kioku)
35. The Head of God (神の頭, Kami no Kashira)
36. The Oni's Kanabou (鬼の金棒, Oni no Kanabō)
37. The Yearned-For Showbiz World (憧れの芸能界, Akogare no Geinō-kai)
38. The Rainbow Cloth (虹の反物, Niji no Tanmono)
39. The Prometheus Stone (プロメテウスの石, Purometeusu no Ishi)
40. The Western Ashu (西のアシュ, Nishi no Ashu)
41. The Mercurius Vessel (メルクリウスの器, Merukuriusu no Utsuwa)
42. The Age of the Questers (クエスターの時代, Kuesutā no Jidai)
43. The Dangerous Christmas Present (危険な贈物(クリスマスプレゼント), Kiken na Kurisumasu Purezento)
44. The Hermit's Onsen (仙人の温泉, Sennin no Onsen)
45. The Evilest Wicked Dragon (最凶の邪悪竜, Saikyō no Jaakuryū)
46. The Awakened Darkness (目覚めた闇, Mezameta Yami)
47. The Box of Despair (絶望の函, Zetsubō no Hako)
48. The Fearsome High Priest (恐怖なる大神官, Kyōfu naru Daishinkan)
49. The Endless Adventure Spirits (果て無き冒険魂, Hatenaki Bōken Damashii)

== Production ==
The trademark for the series was filed by Toei Company on November 10, 2005.

== Films ==
=== Theatrical ===
==== The Greatest Precious ====
Episode 18 of Kamen Rider Kabuto showed a short preview for the Boukenger movie, and starting with Task 19, Boukenger showed its own previews. The movie is titled GoGo Sentai Boukenger the Movie: The Greatest Precious (轟轟戦隊ボウケンジャー THE MOVIE 最強のプレシャス, Gōgō Sentai Bōkenjā Za Mūbī Saikyō no Pureshasu), which occurs between Tasks 28 and 29. It was released in theatres on August 5, 2006, doubled-billed with Kamen Rider Kabuto: God Speed Love. A mysterious being called Muse (ミューズ, Myūzu) awakens, announcing the Precious to whoever gets to her first, causing a 5-way confrontation between the Boukengers, Gajah, the Jaryuu Clan, Dark Shadow, and the Questers. Even Satoru's father Kouichi is involved. But as Satoru learns while dealing with his father's ideals, the prize is more treacherous than the path to it.

== Other Specials ==
=== Boukenger vs. Super Sentai ===
As with Gaoranger before it, Boukenger features a team-up special featuring five past Sentai members and a new hero, entitled GoGo Sentai Boukenger vs. Super Sentai (轟轟戦隊ボウケンジャーVSスーパー戦隊, Gōgō Sentai Bōkenjā tai Sūpā Sentai).

The villain for this special, Time Demon Chronos (時の魔神クロノス, Toki no Majin Kuronosu), abducts all of the Boukenger, save for Eiji, into an alternate dimension. A warrior known as Aka Red contacts Eiji on Earth and provides him with a book that holds the names of all of the past warriors. He seeks the assistance of Tsubasa Ozu (Magi Yellow of Mahō Sentai Magiranger) at a boxing match, Tekkan "Tetsu" Aira (Deka Break of Tokusou Sentai Dekaranger) while he is undercover, Asuka (Abare Black of Bakuryū Sentai Abaranger) taking care of his daughter on Dino Earth, and Nanami Nono (Hurricane Blue of Ninpuu Sentai Hurricaneger) at her concert. They then fight Chronos who has purchased Gordom Engines from Gajah to bring back Furabiijo from Hurricaneger, revive Duchess Org TsueTsue from Hyakujuu Sentai Gaoranger and Sorcery Priest Meemy of Magiranger. While the remaining Boukengers are in the other dimension, they meet up with Hikaru (Magi Shine of Magiranger) and Smoky, his cat genie, and try to find a way to escape. When Chronos turns Meemy, TsueTsue, and Furabiijo into a staff-like Precious with a Hazard Level of 666, Aka Red becomes a vessel for the six Sentai Spirits and allows for DaiVoyager to become Burning Legend DaiVoyager (バーニングレジェンドダイボイジャー, Bāningu Rejendo Daiboijā). The events of the movie take place between Tasks 42 and 43.

=== Gekiranger vs. Boukenger ===
In Juken Sentai Gekiranger vs. Boukenger (獣拳戦隊ゲキレンジャーＶＳボウケンジャー, Jūken Sentai Gekirenjā tai Bōkenjā), the Gekiranger team meets up with the team from GoGo Sentai Boukenger. The DVD was released on March 14, 2008, for rental and March 21, 2008, for purchase. This is the first team-up to be in wide-screen, appropriate as Boukenger and Gekiranger were the first Sentai series to be themselves shown in wide-screen. The events of the movie take place between Lessons 35 and 36. The film is dedicated to Machiko Soga who died in 2006

=== Gozyuger vs. Boonboomger ===
No.1 Sentai Gozyuger vs. Boonboomger (ナンバーワン戦隊ゴジュウジャーVSブンブンジャー, Nanbā Wan Sentai Gojūjā Tai Bunbunjā) is a V-Cinema release that features a crossover between No.1 Sentai Gozyuger and Bakuage Sentai Boonboomger. The V-Cinema received a limited theatrical release on March 20, 2026, followed by its DVD and Blu-ray release on July 29, 2026. The events of the film take place after the end of the series. Masaki Nakao, Ryota Ozawa and Mitsuomi Takahashi also reprise their respective roles as Yamato Kazakiri/Zyuoh Eagle from Doubutsu Sentai Zyuohger, Captain Marvelous/Gokai Red from Kaizoku Sentai Gokaiger and Satoru Akashi/Bouken Red from GoGo Sentai Boukenger.

== Cast ==
- Satoru Akashi: Mitsuomi Takahashi (高橋 光臣, Takahashi Mitsuomi)
- Masumi Inou: Yasuka Saitoh (齋藤 ヤスカ, Saitō Yasuka)
- Souta Mogami: Masashi Mikami (三上 真史, Mikami Masashi)
- Natsuki Mamiya: Chise Nakamura (中村 知世, Nakamura Chise)
- Sakura Nishihori: Haruka Suenaga (末永 遥, Suenaga Haruka)
- Eiji Takaoka: Masayuki Deai (出合 正幸, Deai Masayuki)
- Shizuka of the Wind: Mami Yamasaki (山崎 真実, Yamasaki Mami)
- High Priest Gajah: Hiroo Otaka (大高 洋夫, Ōtaka Hiroo)
- Morio Makino: Shigeru Saiki (斉木 しげる, Saiki Shigeru)

=== Voice cast ===
- Mister Voice: Nobuo Tanaka (田中 信夫, Tanaka Nobuo)
- Great Sword Man Zubaan (大剣人ズバーン, Daikenjin Zubān): Hideyuki Hori (堀 秀行, Hori Hideyuki)
- Creator King Ryuuwon: Junpei Morita (森田 順平, Morita Junpei)
- Dragonoid Soldier Jaryuu: Tamotsu Nishiwaki (西脇 保, Nishiwaki Tamotsu)
- Gekkou of Illusions: Banjō Ginga (銀河 万丈, Ginga Banjō)
- Yaiba of Darkness: Takaya Kuroda (黒田 崇矢, Kuroda Takaya)
- Furious Fiend Gai: Kenta Miyake (三宅 健太, Miyake Kenta)
- Grand Beast Rei: Chihiro Suzuki (鈴木 千尋, Suzuki Chihiro)
- Boukenger Equipment, Narrator: Shinichirō Ōta (太田 真一郎, Ōta Shin'ichirō)

=== Guest cast ===
- Jimon Kagawa (香川 慈門, Kagawa Jimon; 7): Koji Shimizu (清水 紘治, Shimizu Kōji)
- Phantom Thief Selene (13): Nana Yanagisawa (柳沢 なな, Yanagisawa Nana)
- Magi (15–16): Mike Maki (マイク 真木, Maiku Maki)
- Ragi (15–16): Takeru Shibaki (柴木 丈瑠, Shibaki Takeru)
- Kei (19–20, 41–42, 48): Mami Higashiyama (東山 麻美, Higashiyama Mami)
- Karato Takaoka (19–20, 40): Hiroshi Watari (渡 洋史, Watari Hiroshi)
- Yuji Toba (23): Akira Kubodera (窪寺 昭, Kubodera Akira)
- Strange Woman Clorinda (怪女クロリンダ, Kaijo Kurorinda; 26): Makiko Kuno (クノ 真季子, Kuno Makiko)
- Kousuke Shimada (32): Makoto Sakamoto (坂本 真, Sakamoto Makoto)
- Natsuki's father (33–34): Keisuke Tsuchiya (土屋 圭輔, Tsuchiya Keisuke)
- Natsuki's mother (33–34): Eri Tanaka (たなか えり, Tanaka Eri)
- Toshiro Tanbara (丹原 敏郎, Tanbara Toshirō; 37): Tetsuo Morishita (森下 哲夫, Morishita Tetsuo)
- Manager Wakabayashi (若林マネージャー, Wabayashi Manējā; 37): Tatsuya Nōmi (能見 達也, Nōmi Tatsuya)
- Eve (43): Rina Akiyama (秋山莉奈, Akiyama Rina)
- Wicked Dragon Tagargin (邪悪竜ダガーギン, Jākuryū Tagāgin; Voice; 45): Yuji Kishi (岸 祐二, Kishi Yūji)

== Songs ==
Opening theme

- "GoGo Sentai Boukenger" (轟轟戦隊ボウケンジャー, Gōgō Sentai Bōkenjā)
  - Lyrics: Yūho Iwasato
  - Composition: Nobuo Yamada
  - Arrangement: Seiichi Kyōda
  - Artist: NoB

Ending theme

- "Boukensha ON THE ROAD" (冒険者 ON THE ROAD, Bōkensha On Za Rōdo; "Adventurers on the Road")
  - Lyrics: Yūho Iwasato
  - Composition: YOFFY
  - Arrangement: Psychic Lover & Kenichirō Ōishi
  - Artist: Psychic Lover
