= Eri Tanaka =

Japanese actress and voice actress

- たなかえり
- Born: Eri Tanaka; Kanagawa Prefecture, Japan
- Occupations: Actress; voice actress
- Years active: 1996-2005
- Known for: Chisato Jougasaki / Mega Yellow in Denji Sentai Megaranger

Eri Tanaka (たなかえり, Tanaka Eri) is a Japanese actress and voice actress who is best known for her role as Chisato Jougasaki/Mega Yellow in the 1997 Super Sentai series Denji Sentai Megaranger, and Later Reprised Her Role in the Teamup Special Megaranger Vs Gingaman. Her former stage name was Eri Tanaka (田中 恵理, Tanaka Eri) - which was similar, but written in kanji.

== Filmography ==
=== Television ===
- Choukou Senshi Changéríon - Mayumi (1996)
- Denji Sentai Megaranger - Chisato Jougasaki/Mega Yellow (1997-1998)
- Kamen Rider Kuuga - Nozomi Sasayama (2000-2001)
- GoGo Sentai Boukenger - Natsuki's mother (2006-2007) / episodes 33 and 34

=== Film ===
- Denji Sentai Megaranger vs. Gekisou Sentai Carranger - Chisato Jougasaki/Mega Yellow (1997)
- Seijuu Sentai Gingaman vs. Megaranger - Chisato Jougasaki/Mega Yellow (1998)

=== Voice roles ===
- Power Rangers in Space - cameo appearance (1998)
- Power Rangers Lost Galaxy - Maya/Yellow Galaxy Ranger (Cerina Vincent) (1999)
