= Alienators: Evolution Continues =

Television series, 2001–2002

- Also known as: Evolution: The Animated Series
- Genre: Science fiction comedy
- Created by: Louis Gassin
- Based on: Evolution by Don Jakoby
- Directed by: Fabrice Beau; Pascal Gaugry; Camille Prinele
- Voices of: Mark Acheson; Andrew Francis; Fiona Hogan; Cusse Mankuma; Akiko Morison; Kirby Morrow; John Payne; Lee Tockar
- Theme music composer: L.A. Piccirillo
- Opening theme: "Evolution (Creepy Crawly)"
- Ending theme: "Evolution (Creepy Crawly)" (Instrumental)
- Composers: L.A. Piccirillo; Jean-Michel Guirao
- Countries of origin: United States; Japan; France
- Original language: English
- No. of seasons: 1
- No. of episodes: 26

Production
- Executive producers: Andy Heyward; Michael Maliani; Tom Pollock; Ivan Reitman; Dan Goldberg; Joe Medjuck
- Producer: Michael Ryan
- Running time: 22 minutes
- Production companies: DIC Entertainment, L.P.; The Montecito Picture Company; DreamWorks Television; Columbia TriStar Television; Dentsu

Original release
- Network: Fox Kids (United States) M6 (France) Animax (Japan)
- Release: September 15, 2001 – June 22, 2002

Alienators: Evolution Continues (also known as Evolution: The Animated Series in some regions and the United Kingdom) is an animated science fiction comedy television series. It is a continuation of the 2001 Ivan Reitman-directed science fiction comedy film Evolution. The series aired on Fox Kids in the United States, M6 in France and Animax in Japan from September 15, 2001 to June 22, 2002. 26 episodes were produced.

Created by Louis Gassin, the series is produced by DIC Entertainment, L.P. in association with The Montecito Picture Company, DreamWorks Television, Columbia TriStar Television and Dentsu, the latter of which handled distribution of the series in Asian territories. Although the Evolution intellectual property was owned by DreamWorks and is now the property of Paramount Pictures (which owns the studio's pre-2010 live-action back catalog), the series itself is now owned by WildBrain (formerly known as DHX Media).

The series was the basis for a Game Boy Advance game of the same name that was developed by Digital Eclipse and published by Activision.

== Premise ==
As with the film, the premise of the series is that a meteor carrying organisms that evolve at a very quick rate crashes into the Arizona desert; single-celled alien organisms on this meteor quickly evolve into monstrous creatures, dubbed the "Genus". A team of scientists, the Alienators, must eliminate all these creatures before they destroy all life on Earth. The characters, Ira Kane, Harry Block, Lucy Mai, and Wayne Green must study all these extraterrestrial lifeforms and find a way to defeat them all. The "Genus" is led by a "humanoid manifestation" named Scopes.

== Characters ==
- Ira Kane (voiced by Kirby Morrow) is a professor whose expertise, along with his passion for science, helps him lead the team in eliminating the Genus.
- Harry Block (voiced by Cusse Mankuma) is a coach who always keeps up on game scores, etc., and loves coaching the women's team. His strategies help the team to victory.
- Lucy Mai (voiced by Akiko Morison) is a tough and aggressive but benevolent lieutenant trained by a special forces team called the Blue Berets. She is a skilled martial artist and acrobat.
- Wayne Green (voiced by Andrew Francis) is a 17-year-old firefighter-in-training. After being infected with alien DNA, Wayne develops a "sympathetic mutation", causing him to mutate parallel to the Genus.
- Allison Reed (voiced by Fiona Hogan) is a scientist who is an associate of the Alienators.
- G.A.S.S.I.E. (vocal effects provided by Lee Tockar) is an alien cell who was neutralized by Ira. Its name is short for Genetically Altered Symbiotic Stasis in Evolution. G.A.S.S.I.E. is a slime creature who behaves like a dog and can detect and track other Genus creatures. When G.A.S.S.I.E. detects the Genus, he quivers and emits a foul odor.
- General Russell Woodman (voiced by John Payne) is a skeptical general who often tries to bomb or control a town where the Genus is attacking.
- Scopes (voiced by Mark Acheson) is the Genus's leader, who is highly intelligent, maniacal, arrogant, and intent on taking over the universe. He takes on many forms throughout the series, but is most commonly seen as a humanoid octopus.
- General Granger is an arrogant and treacherous general who seeks to use the Genus to conquer Earth in order to "fix the world". This leads to Granger eventually becoming Scopes' pawn in the "REAPER" episodes.

== Episodes ==
No.	Title	Written by	Original release date
1	"Survival"	Michael Ryan	September 15, 2001
2	"Survival"	Michael Ryan	September 22, 2001
3	"Survival"	Michael Ryan	September 29, 2001
Doctor Kane, Wayne, Lieutenant Lucy, and Harry Block must band together when the Genus return under the leadership of the humanoid Genus Scopes.
4	"Don't Drink the Water"	Ben Townsend	October 6, 2001
The Alienators take down a target at the Glen Canyon dam, but this results in its DNA mixing with the water supply causing the populace to mutate into human/Genus creatures.
5	"Slick"	Michael Ryan	October 13, 2001
When an oil tanker laden with Genus infested petroleum runs aground near the Galapagos Islands, a disaster of epic proportions threatens humanity.
6	"Swarm"	Ben Townsend	October 20, 2001
When a swarm of Genus wasps overruns a rural farm, Ira and the team are sent in to deal with it.
7	"Fire and Ice"	Kurt Weldon	October 27, 2001
An outbreak in the French Alps leads to the discovery of a new kind of Genus, which is an ice Genus.
8	"Meltdown"	Mark Seidenberg	November 3, 2001
The Alienators race against time when Scopes works to start a nuclear-meltdown to cause a widespread Genus-invasion.
9	"Junkyard Dogs"	Dick Grunert	November 10, 2001
10	"French Underground"	Nick Dubois and Lance Falk	November 17, 2001
Split from the other Alienators, General Woodburn and Doctor Kane must work together to escape Scopes.
11	"Runaway Strain"	Michael Ryan	December 1, 2001
The work of two rookie scientists to destroy Genus result on monstrous Genus plants and the team being locked up, who then race against time to stop a nuclear bomb.
12	"Dead Wayne Cells"	Ben Townsend	December 8, 2001
After battling a horde of rapidly-replicating Genus creatures, Wayne's sympathetic mutation system kicks in and he starts to multiply.
13	"Roman Holiday"	Ben Townsend	February 9, 2002
The Alienators go to Rome where Scopes leads an invasion of Genus who copied the genes of zoo animals.
14	"To Carthage Then I Came"	Michael Ryan	February 16, 2002
A Genus outbreak in the deserts of Tunisia has Ira and his crew fighting Genus monsters that move through the sand as if it were water.
15	"Year of the Genus"	Ben Townsend	February 23, 2002
When the Genus travels to Hong Kong in a crate of infected fireworks, the Alienators are not far behind.
16	"Hot Java"	Michael Ryan	March 2, 2002
The Alienators race against time to stop Scopes from using a volcano on the island of Java, Indonesia, to cause a global Genus invasion.
17	"Ira Knows Best"	Ben Townsend	March 9, 2002
The Alienator's rest with Doctor Kane's parents goes wild when Scopes leads an army of Genus copying the local farm stock.
18	"Itching for the Genus"	Michael Ryan	March 16, 2002
When the Genus does not show up, it looks like the heroes have managed to devolve themselves right out of a job as they have an encounter with General Granger after he and some scientists have abducted G.A.S.S.I.E.
19	"Genus in Your Tank"	Kurt Weldon	March 23, 2002
When Genus-infested gas makes its way into the cars of New York City, vehicular mayhem rocks the Big Apple.
20	"Cradle Will Fall"	Ben Townsend	March 30, 2002
When Wayne goes to join the local firefighters, Dr. Kane's work to replace G.A.S.S.I.E. backfires when Scopes pops up and forces Wayne back before things heat up.
21	"Head Case"	Dick Grunert	May 4, 2002
A visit to Dr. Bradbury goes critical when Scopes works to use mind-control for conquest using Dr. Kane as a guinea pig.
22	"End Game"	Ben Townsend	May 11, 2002
Ira and the Alienators head off to merry ol' England to investigate a "purple worm" sighting in an old castle.
23	"General Disorder"	Ben Townsend	May 18, 2002
On the Arctic, Scopes injects General Woodburn with venom to lure the Alienators to an ambush. As Woodburn is being treated, General Granger plans to reign Scopes in and keep him under his control as he instructs his ally First Mate Benedict to bring Scopes to him alive using Operation: Helix.
24	"REAPER 1: Countdown"	Michael Ryan	June 8, 2002
The Alienators learn of Scopes and General Granger forming an alliance to conquer Earth.
25	"REAPER 2: The Ark"	Ben Townsend	June 15, 2002
The Alienators board a space ark and clash some Genus as well as one of General Granger's robots.
26	"REAPER 3: Alpha Omega"	Michael Ryan	June 22, 2002
The Alienators confront Scopes as he works to use General Granger to spread the Genus across the universe.

== Cast ==
=== Principal voice actors ===
- Mark Acheson as Scopes
- Andrew Francis as Wayne Green
- Fiona Hogan as Allison Reed
- Cusse Mankuma as Harry Block
- Akiko Morrison as Lucy Mai
- Kirby Morrow as Ira Kane
- John Payne as General Russell Woodman
- Lee Tockar as G.A.S.S.I.E.

=== Additional voices ===
- Tony Alcantar
- Kathleen Barr
- Jim Byrnes
- Joely Collins
- Bernard Cuffling
- Deborah DeMille
- Maria Louisa Figura
- Colin Foo
- Mackenzie Gray
- Kim Hawthorne
- Mark Hildreth
- Adrian Holmes
- Kristie Marsden
- Maxine Miller
- Richard Newman
- Manny Petruzelli
- Taylor-Anne Reid
- Alvin Sanders
- Peter Shinkoda
- Chantal Strand
- Sam Vincent
- Dale Wilson
- Lenore Zann

== Crew ==
- Marsha Goodman - voice director
- Paul F. Quinn - voice director

== Production ==
In 2001, DIC picked up the animation rights to produce an animated series based on the film. Fox Kids acquired the North American broadcast rights and ordered 26 episodes to be produced for the Fall of 2001. The series premiered in September.

The same year in June, Lions Gate Home Entertainment signed a home media distribution deal DIC Entertainment which included Alienators.

In September, DIC signed an alliance agreement with Dentsu, the latter of which would invest, partner and co-produce the series with DIC in exchange for Asian and Japanese distribution rights excluding India.

=== Broadcast ===
In September 2001, YTV acquired Canadian broadcast rights to the series under a deal with DIC Entertainment.

== Home media ==
In the United States, Lions Gate Home Entertainment and Trimark Home Video released Evolution: The Animated Movie on VHS and DVD on January 29, 2002. This release consisted of the three-part episode "Survival" in a feature-length format. It was re-released by Sterling Entertainment Group on November 13, 2003 with the DVD version containing the fourth episode "Don't Drink the Water" as a bonus feature. The entire series is also available on Amazon Prime Video.

In the United Kingdom, Anchor Bay UK released a single DVD/VHS set of the series on June 28, 2004, containing the first four episodes and later released another DVD containing the next four. Avenue Entertainment would also release two DVDs containing two episodes each.

In Japan, six VHS/DVD releases, consisting of the entire series, was released in Japan by Happinet in January 2003. These sets were later released as part of two boxsets.
