= Mami Higashiyama =

Japanese actress and singer

- 東山麻美
- Born: Mami Higashiyama; Himeji, Hyōgo, Japan
- Occupations: Actress, singer
- Years active: 1997–2006 2011

Mami Higashiyama (東山麻美 Higashiyama Mami) is a Japanese actress and singer, best known for her role as MegaPink/Miku Imamura in Denji Sentai Megaranger. She is affiliated with Sun Music Brain talent agency.

== Selected filmography ==
=== Anime ===
- Earth Maiden Arjuna (2001) – Juna Ariyoshi/Arjuna
- Wangan Midnight (2007) – Mika Murakami (eps. 16–19)
- Shikabane Hime: Kuro (2009) – Hibiki Shijou (eps. 9, 11 and 12)

=== Television ===
- Denji Sentai Megaranger (1997) – MegaPink/Miku Imamura
- GoGo Sentai Boukenger (2006) – Kei (eps. 19, 20, 41 and 42)

=== Film ===
- Hyakujuu Sentai Gaoranger vs. Super Sentai (2001) – MegaPink/Miku Imamura
- Mondai no nai watashitachi (2004)
