= Hyakujuu Sentai Gaoranger vs. Super Sentai =

2001 Japanese film

The theatrical poster for Gaoranger vs. Super Sentai

Hyakujuu Sentai Gaoranger vs. Super Sentai (百獣戦隊ガオレンジャーＶＳスーパー戦隊, Hyakujū Sentai Gaorenjā tai Sūpā Sentai) is a Super Sentai Series V-Cinema movie which celebrates the 25th anniversary of the Super Sentai Series, released August 10, 2001. It features a team up of the protagonists of Hyakujuu Sentai Gaoranger with previous heroes of the Super Sentai Series over its twenty-five year history. This movie would be the inspiration for the Power Rangers Wild Force episode Forever Red.

== Plot ==
When the Gaorangers engage in another battle with the Org Dukes Yabaiba and Tsue-Tsue, the two manage to summon the Lost Highness Rakushaasa, an Org Duke who can siphon the fighting spirit out of his opponents. Rakushaasa lends his power to Yabaiba and Tsue-Tsue, enabling them to defeat the Gaorangers. He then attacks and drains Gao Yellow (Gaku Washio), Gao Blue (Kai Samezu) and Gao Black (Sotaro Ushigome) of their battle spirits, leaving them in a state of near panic. Gao Red (Kakeru Shishi) quickly orders Gao White (Sae Taiga) to escort the other Gaorangers to safety as he continues to battle Rakushaasa alone.

Rakushaasa subjects Gao Red to several illusion-based battles with previously vanquished Org Dukes, attempting to drive him to despair. Meanwhile, the shaken Gaorangers are suddenly confronted by a wandering monk, who tells them of the existence of Super Sentai, teams of multi-colored warriors of whom the Gaorangers are the latest version. Each of the Gaorangers' G-Phones then scurries off, causing the Gaorangers to chase them.

The scurrying G-Phones lead each Gaoranger to a member of a previous Super Sentai team. Gaku is led to Yuusuke Amamiya, Red Falcon of Choujuu Sentai Liveman, who gives him a training lesson in swordsmanship and explains the Super Sentai's expertise with weaponry. Kai encounters Daimon Tatsumi, Go Yellow of Kyuukyuu Sentai GoGoFive, who explains how each Sentai team develops fighting techniques. Sotaro is led to Gouki, Ginga Blue of Seijuu Sentai Gingaman, who teaches Gao Black about the Sentai use of physical strength. Sai meets Miku Imamura, Mega Pink of Denji Sentai Megaranger, who explains the strengths and abilities of female Super Sentai members.

The two women are then surprised by Yabaiba and Tsue-Tsue, but the two Org Dukes are then challenged by the wandering monk, who reveals himself to be Banba Soukichi, Big One of J.A.K.Q. Dengekitai. Banba and Miku help Sai rescue an exhausted Kakeru from Rakushaasa's clutches, and the heroes are quickly joined by the rejuvenated Gaorangers and their Super Sentai teachers.

As the former Super Sentai (led by Banba) engage and destroy Rakushaasa's hastily summoned force of Org Dukes, the Gaorangers battle and defeat Yabaiba, Tsue-Tsue and Rakushaasa. Rakushaasa then summons more power, growing to giant size and attacking the city. He easily defeats the Gaorangers' Gao Muscle, but is driven back by an onslaught unleashed from an array of transforming mecha and special vehicles from Super Sentai history. The Gaorangers then summon Gao King, which is then imbued with energy from past Super Sentai combined mecha forms. Gao King then unleashes a powerful blast that annihilates Rakushaasa's giant form.

But Rakushaasa is not destroyed; he rejuvenates himself by draining power from a fleeing Yabaiba and Tsue-Tsue and attacks the Super Sentai. The former Sentai explain that the Gaorangers need to summon Super Sentai Tamashii, the pure fighting spirit that imbues all of the teams. To help inspire them, Red Falcon summons 23 other Red Warriors from all the previous Super Sentai teams, from Akarenger of Himitsu Sentai Gorenger to Time Red of Mirai Sentai Timeranger. Their presence inspires the Gaorangers to summon Super Sentai Damashi from within themselves, which Kakeru uses to finally disintegrate Rakushaasa.

With Rakushaasa's defeat, all the former Super Sentai vanish. Returning to their home base, the Gaorangers find their mentor Tetomu in a faint; she vaguely remembers seeing Rakushaasa's appearing but quickly dismisses it as a bad dream. It's left to Gaoranger's narrator to assure the team (and the viewer) that the adventure was real.

== Characters ==
=== New ===
- Lost Highness Rakushaasa (はぐれハイネスラクシャーサ, Hagure Hainesu Rakushāsa): A hairy Org who happened to be the most powerful of the Highness Duke Orgs, but his immense power caused his horn to be damaged and sent him into a coma. He gathers energy by taking the fighting spirit of strong-willed warriors to fully heal his horn.

=== Past Super Sentai Members ===
==== Big One ====
Sokichi Banba/Big One (番場壮吉/ビッグワン, Banba Sōkichi/Biggu Wan): Disguised as a wandering monk, he helped the Gaorangers get over their despair and became the leader of the "Dream Sentai" team.

Hiroshi Miyauchi reprises his role as the leader of J.A.K.Q. Dengekitai.

==== Red Falcon ====
Yusuke Amamiya/Red Falcon (天宮勇介/レッドファルコン, Amamiya Yūsuke/Reddo Farukon): 12 years later, Yusuke is found looking at the 4 graves of Takuji Yano, Rui Sanda, Mari Aikawa, and Kenji Tsukigata who were friends and/or allies of the Choujuu Sentai Liveman team. Yuusuke dueled Gaku Washio (Gao Yellow) in a sword fight and then lectured Gaku on the many sword-wielding warriors of the Super Sentai Series, and introduced the Gaorangers to the other 23 Red Senshi.

Daisuke Shima reprises his role as Red Falcon from Choujuu Sentai Liveman.

==== Mega Pink ====
Miku Imamura/Mega Pink (今村 みく/メガピンク, Imamura Miku/Megapinku): Found playing a video arcade game at Game Riribabita, she lectured Sae Taiga (Gao White) on many female senshi and their shared skill at changing their clothes in the blink of an eye, something that Sae had never done before.

Mami Higashiyama reprises her role as Mega Pink from Denji Sentai Megaranger.

==== Ginga Blue ====
Gouki/Ginga Blue (ゴウキ/ギンガブルー, Gōki/Ginga burū): Still protecting the Ginga Forest, his element is water. He lectured Soutarou Ushigome (Gao Black) on the many strong warriors of the Super Sentai Series.

Shōei reprises his role as Ginga Blue from Seijuu Sentai Gingaman.

==== Go Yellow ====
Daimon Tatsumi/Go Yellow (巽 大門/ゴーイエロー, Tatsumi Daimon/Gōierō): A street police officer, still obsessed with drinking milk. Daimon taught Kai Samezu (Gao Blue) how to perform his famous "Cow's Killer Milk Tornado Drop" (牛乳竜巻落とし, Gyūnyū Tatsumaki Otoshi), which Kai eventually uses on Lost Highness Rakushaasa, and lectured Kai on the Super Sentai Series' technical warriors.

Kenji Shibata reprises his role as Go Yellow from Kyuukyuu Sentai GoGoFive.

==== The Red Warriors ====
In addition to Red Falcon, 23 Red Rangers, representing the history of Super Sentai, are summoned to aid the Gaorangers. They do not unmask, but perform their "roll call" poses (an assortment of clips from previous Super Sentai shows, in some cases including the music from the original clip). In order of appearance, and excluding Red Falcon and Gao Red, they are:

- Himitsu Sentai Gorenger (1975-1977): Akarenger
- J.A.K.Q. Dengekitai (1977): Spade Ace
- Battle Fever J (1979-1980): Battle Japan
- Denshi Sentai Denziman (1980-1981): Denzi Red
- Taiyo Sentai Sun Vulcan (1981-1982): Vul Eagle
- Dai Sentai Goggle V (1982-1983): Goggle Red
- Kagaku Sentai Dynaman (1983-1984): Dyna Red
- Choudenshi Bioman (1984-1985): Red One
- Dengeki Sentai Changeman (1985-1986): Change Dragon
- Choushinsei Flashman (1986-1987): Red Flash
- Hikari Sentai Maskman (1987-1988): Red Mask
- Kousoku Sentai Turboranger (1989-1990): Red Turbo
- Chikyuu Sentai Fiveman (1990-1991): Five Red
- Choujin Sentai Jetman (1991-1992): Red Hawk
- Kyōryū Sentai Zyuranger (1992-1993): Tyranno Ranger
- Gosei Sentai Dairanger (1993-1994): Ryu Ranger
- Ninja Sentai Kakuranger (1994-1995): Ninja Red
- Chouriki Sentai Ohranger (1995-1996): Oh Red
- Gekisou Sentai Carranger (1996-1997): Red Racer
- Denji Sentai Megaranger (1997-1998): Mega Red
- Seijuu Sentai Gingaman (1998-1999): Ginga Red
- Kyuukyuu Sentai GoGoFive (1999-2000): Go Red
- Mirai Sentai Timeranger (2000-2001): Time Red

== Screenings ==
The film was screened in October 2020 at the Tokyo International Film Festival.

== See also ==
- Super Sentai
- Forever Red
- GoGo Sentai Boukenger vs. Super Sentai
- Gokaiger Goseiger Super Sentai 199 Hero Great Battle
- Super Sentai World
