= Mitsuomi Takahashi =

Japanese actor

- 高橋 光臣
- Born: March 10, 1982 (age 44); Osaka, Japan
- Occupation: Actor
- Years active: 2005–present
- Website: t-collect.tokyo

Mitsuomi Takahashi (高橋 光臣, Takahashi Mitsuomi; March 10, 1982) is a Japanese actor best known for playing Satoru Akashi/Bouken Red in the tokusatsu show GoGo Sentai Boukenger. He took part in the 20th and 21st SASUKE competition. He failed both times in the first stage.

== Filmography ==
=== Television ===
- GoGo Sentai Boukenger (2006), Satoru Akashi/BoukenRed
- Ryōmaden (2010), Yamawaki Jūkichi
- Doctor Ume (2012), Toshio Matsuoka
- Segodon (2018), Arimura Shunsai
- No Side Manager (2019), Tetsu Kishiwada
- DCU: Deep Crime Unit (2022), Toma Nishino
- Sunset (2023), Masataka Kamiike
- Fermat's Cuisine (2023), Yusaku Awashima
- Dear Radiance (2024), Fujiwara no Yoshikane
- Song of the Samurai (2026), Hirayama Goro
- Vivant (2026, season 2 ep 16 (6)) as Zhang Jingshi
- Shiawase wa Aru (2026), Tsunku
- The Shogunate Rebel (2027), Komai Tomoatsu

=== Films ===
- Sanada 10 Braves (2016)
- Kingdom 3: The Flame of Destiny (2023), Gan Yang
- Kingdom 4: Return of the Great General (2024), Gan Yang
- Kingdom 5: The Clash of Souls (2026), Gan Yang
