= Denji Sentai Megaranger =

Television series

- Title card
- Genre: Tokusatsu; Superhero fiction Science fiction
- Created by: Toei Company
- Developed by: Junki Takegami
- Directed by: Takao Nagaishi
- Starring: Hayato Oshiba; Atsushi Ehara; Masaya Matsukaze; Eri Tanaka; Mami Higashiyama; Shigeru Kanai; Satoru Saito; Tetsuo Morishita; Asami Jō
- Opening theme: "Denji Sentai Megaranger" by Naoto Fūga
- Ending theme: "Ki no Sei ka na" by Naoto Fūga "Bomb Dancing Megaranger" by Hiroko Asakawa
- Composer: Keiichi Oku
- Country of origin: Japan
- Original language: Japanese
- No. of episodes: 51 (list of episodes)

Production
- Producers: Kenji Ōta; Shigenori Takadera; Naomi Takabe; Madellaine Paxson; Kōichi Yada
- Production location: Tokyo, Japan (Greater Tokyo Area)
- Running time: approx. 25 minutes
- Production companies: TV Asahi; Toei Company; Toei Agency

Original release
- Network: ANN (TV Asahi)
- Release: February 14, 1997 – February 15, 1998

Related
- Gekisou Sentai Carranger; Seijuu Sentai Gingaman

Denji Sentai Megaranger (電磁戦隊メガレンジャー, Denji Sentai Megarenjā; Electromagnetic Squadron Megaranger) is Toei's 21st production of the Super Sentai metaseries, and the second Sentai after Kousoku Sentai Turboranger in which all heroes are high school students. The footage was also used in the American series Power Rangers in Space. It aired from February 14, 1997, to February 15, 1998, replacing Gekisou Sentai Carranger, and was replaced by Seijuu Sentai Gingaman. Toei gave it the name Mega Rangers for international distribution.

Shout! Factory released "Denji Sentai Megaranger: The Complete Series" on DVD on October 31, 2017. This is the sixth Super Sentai series to be released in North America on Region 1 DVD. In January 2018, Shout! streamed the series on their website.

One of the series villain costumes and a prop were used for the seventh season of the American Power Rangers series (Power Rangers Lost Galaxy, which was adapting the 1998 Sentai installment Seijuu Sentai Gingaman).

== Plot ==
Kenta Date, a senior high school student, is the ultimate champion of an arcade video game called Megaranger. He belongs to the Cybernetics club, a group of like minded friends from his school. Koichiro Endo, Shun Namiki, Chisato Jogaseki, and Miku Imamura are also members of Cybernetics. The International Network of Excel-Science and Technology (INET), the games creators, invite Kenta and the Cybernetics club members to tour the INET laboratories. Following a short tour of the INET HQ buildings, the company is attacked by the Neijirejia, an evil force led by Dr. Hinelar on a mission to conquer the current reality. Dr. Kubota, INET's chief scientist, reveals that Megaranger was more than only a simple video game but actually a combat simulator to identify potential recruits for a super fighting team to combat the Neijirejia. While the INET headquarters (HQ) is destroyed by the Neijirejia warrior Yugande, Dr. Kubota gives Kenta and his friends devices known as 'Degitaizers'. By entering the key-code "3-3-5" and shouting "Install, Megaranger!", the five students transform into the Megarangers to fight the Nejirejia.

== Characters ==
=== INET ===
The International Network of Excel-Science and Technology (世界科学者連邦, Sekai Kagakusha Renpō; INET) is the company responsible for the Megaranger video game used to identify five people to become the Megarangers.

==== Megarangers ====
The Megarangers (sans Yuusaku Hayakawa) transformed. From left to right: Kouichirou Endo, Chisato Jougasaki, Kenta Date, Miku Imamura, and Shun Namiki.

Five high school students are chosen by INET to become the eponymous Megarangers, with one additional member who is an INET agent. Their base of operations is the Digital Research Club at Moroboshi High School.

===== Kenta Date =====
Kenta Date/Mega Red (伊達 健太/メガレッド, Date Kenta/Mega Reddo): 18 years old, Kenta is a slacker and knucklehead who likes yakiniku (to a point where he will ask Dr. Kubota to treat him to a yakiniku lunch for every mission accomplished), but is also friendly, playful, and has a good heart. He becomes an ideal candidate to become a Megaranger after beating a skilled opponent on INET's Megaranger arcade game, which was actually a tool used to recruit Megarangers.

As Mega Red, Kenta's forehead symbol is a personal computer, which enables him to upload data and program skills into his mind, making him an adaptable warrior. Ironically, he is the only member who does not like computers.

===== Kouichirou Endo =====
Kouichirou Endo/Mega Black (遠藤 耕一郎/メガブラック, Endō Kōichirō/Mega Burakku): 18 years old, Kouichirou is the functioning leader and overachiever of the team. Aside from being a keen soccer player, he is a member of the class committee and is concerned about his schoolwork. He balances his duties as a Megaranger and a student. He has a younger brother, Koujiro, who also plays soccer. A natural leader but extremely bossy, he once created an hour by hour schedule for all the Megarangers to follow but they ignored it. During his stay at the Epinard Nasu hotel in Tochigi, Kouichirou encounters a mysterious boy who is a spiritual representation of the forest that is not only in danger of Kinoko Nejire's attack on it but also from INET's Relay Base. He eventually gains the forest spirit's trust as he uses up all his power to help the Megarangers as Kouichirou promises to have INET relocate the relay base.

As Mega Black. Kouichirou's forehead symbol is a digital satellite, which enables him to trace communication sources and transmissions. His special attacks are the Satellite Search, Satellite Scan, and Miracle Shoot (ミラクルシュート, Mirakuru Shūto) (soccer ball kicking attack).

===== Shun Namiki =====
Shun Namiki/Mega Blue (並樹 瞬/メガブルー, Namiki Shun/Mega Burū): 18 years old, Shun is a loner who aspires to become a computer-graphics artist and initially refuses to become a Megaranger. After seeing Kenta attempt to keep the Kunekune from interfering in his lifelong dreams, Shun reconsiders and becomes good friends with Kenta. He plays the flute, as his late mother was a world-renowned flutist. Shun is adept at creating battle strategies, such as confusing the Nejirangers by making the other Megaranger suits look like his. Shun is a Virgo, according to Miku.

As Mega Blue, Shun's forehead symbol is a digital TV, which enables him to create CG images and trap enemies in a movie dimension where characters from that dimension attack the enemy. His special attacks are the Virtual Vision and Virtual Holograph.

===== Chisato Jougasaki =====
Chisato Jougasaki/Mega Yellow (城ヶ崎 千里/メガイエロー, Jōgasaki Chisato/Mega Ierō): 18 years old, Chisato is a kind and mature girl who dreams of becoming a professional photographer. Aside from photography, she is also into singing. She is attracted to Kouichirou.

As Mega Yellow. Chisato's forehead symbol is a digital camera, which enables her to telescopically search for people and things – even allowing her to see through walls – as well as record and playback anything she sees. Her special attacks are the Digicam Search, Galaxy Search, and Blade Arm (ブレードアーム, Burēdo Āmu).

===== Miku Imamura =====
Miku Imamura/Mega Pink (今村 みく/メガピンク, Imamura Miku/Mega Pinku): 18 years old, Miku eats a lot, but is very self-conscious about her weight. She dislikes schoolwork just as much as Kenta, and because of this, the two of them are very good friends. She is attracted to Shun. During the Megarangers' encounter with Bibidevi in episode 17, Miku is accidentally hit by an evolution beam and becomes "Super Mega Pink" (超メガピンク, Chō Mega Pinku), which makes the colored squares on her costume turn gold. As Super Mega Pink, Miku gains super strength and can wield the other Megarangers' weapons. Additionally, her intelligence increases to an IQ of 800, along with a change in her personality. However, after suffering painful side effects, Miku manages to return to her normal self. In Gaoranger vs. Super Sentai, she lectures Sae Taiga (Gao White) on the Super Sentai franchise's many female warriors and their shared skill at changing their clothes in the blink of an eye, something that Sae had never done before.

As Mega Pink, Miku's forehead symbol is a cell phone, which enables her to track and analyze sound waves. Her special attack is the Telephone Search.

===== Yusaku Hayakawa =====
Yusaku Hayakawa/Mega Silver (早川 裕作/メガシルバー, Hayakawa Yūsaku/Mega Shirubā): The 25-year-old chief of INET's Special Development Division, Yusaku is one of the scientists under Kubota who created the Mega Suits, including Mega Silver which was the prototype Mega Suit. Though he is placed in charge of the Super Mega Project, Yusaku secretly took the Mega Silver powers for his own use in helping the Megarangers despite Kubota's insistence that he gets back to work. Initially, Yusaku's transformation into Mega Silver lasts for 2.5 minutes due to how powerful it was, but he was able to repair it by the time Nejirejia discovers this. When the primary Megarangers alter their costumes to look like Shun's to trick the Nejirangers, Yusaku confuses them even further by disguising himself as Neji Silver (ネジシルバー, Neji Shirubā), wielding a twisted version of his Silver Blazer. Yusaku also pilots his own mecha, Mega Winger. He has also demonstrated his culinary skills by preparing a lavish meal to distract a Nezire Beast before Mega Pink defeats it. In the final battle, he is able to assist the Megarangers by using his damaged Mega Winger to free the Voyager Machines from the rubble of the INET Moonbase to give the Megarangers a chance at defeating Death Nejiro and to attend their high school graduation ceremony.

As Mega Silver, Yusaku's forehead symbol is a microchip.

=== Allies ===
==== INET members ====
The following are known members of INET:

===== Prof. Eikichi Kubota =====
Prof. Eikichi Kubota (久保田 衛吉博士, Kubota Eikichi-hakase): He is in charge of the Megaranger program – specifically the Megaranger video game. During a surprise attack on the NASADA base by the Nezirejia, he is forced to give Degitaizer (デジタイザー, Dejitaizā) bracelets to five students – turning them into Megarangers. He was once friends with Dr. Samejima, who had left this dimension for Nezirejia – becoming Dr. Hinelar. Dr. Kubota is a former high school boxer and he plays the trumpet.

===== Shougo Kawasaki =====
Shougo Kawasaki (川崎 省吾, Kawasaki Shōgo): A young man who is the head engineer of the Mega Ship's maintenance department. His father, Professor Kawasaki, is a world authority on robot control programs (helped create the program for Delta Mega) and wants Shougo to attend college, using the program he developed for Delta Mega to get his son back on Earth. However, after Mega Red saves Shougo from Guirail, he is allowed to remain with INET.

Shougo Kawasaki is portrayed by Yuki Tanaka (田中 優樹, Tanaka Yūki).

===== Tachibana =====
Tachibana (立花): A member of INET and a crew member aboard the Galaxy Mega.

Tachibana is portrayed by Takao Miyashita (宮下 敬夫, Miyashita Takao).

===== Pop =====
Pop (ポップ, Poppu): A technician associated with I.N.E.T. who assists the Megarangers.

==== Moroboshi High School ====
Moroboshi High School (諸星学園, Moroboshi Gakuen): The high school attended by the five Megarangers until the series finale. Each of the team's classmates and teachers ended up being involved in a Nejirejian scheme and they become enraged when they learned the identities of the Megarangers to which almost everyone turns against them. It was only in the final battle with Dr. Hinelar that the school realized the error of their stand and started to support the Megarangers.

==== Gen Ooiwa ====
Gen Ooiwa (大岩 厳, Ōiwa Gen): The class' lazy Homeroom/Science teacher. Despite his laziness, he manages to find ways to motivate his students – especially the well-disciplined Kouichirou. In episode 12, while the Megarangers battle Mole Nezire Mr. Ooiwa stumbles upon a meteorite fragment and keeps it in his possession, making him a target of the Nejirejia. When he and Mega Black are captured by Mole Nezire, he tells the overachiever to never give up. As a result, Mr. Ooiwa inspires Mega Black to break free and foil the Nezirejian plans. During the finale, despite the Megarangers being expelled, he is the only staff member not to turn his back on the Megaranger and together with Jirou and Erina start the pep rally to cheer the Megarangers on.

===== Shintarou Wada =====
Shintarou Wada (和田 シンタロウ, Wada Shintarō; 6, 45, 49–51): An overweight shy boy who has a crush on Miku. He threatened to reveal some secret photos of Miku to the school unless she would go on a date with him. Miku agrees as she thought the photos were of her transforming into Mega Pink. The photos are of her sleeping in class and the nurse's office. Shintarou was placed under the control of the Thorn Nejilar to do Dr. Hinelar's bidding until he is freed by the Megarangers. Later after the Megaranger's secret identities are exposed and Jirou is injured during the Nejilars attack, Shintarou blames the Megarangers and turns his back on them. He comes around during the final battle and cheers his friends on. Afterwards, he graduates with his classmates.

Shintarou Wada is portrayed by Takenari Hirowara (広原 武成, Hirowara Takenari).

===== Jirou Iwamoto =====
Jirou Iwamoto (岩本 ジロウ, Iwamoto Jirō; 6, 45, 49, 51): Shintarou's best friend and spokesperson due to Shintarou's shy personality. He consoles Shintarou when Miku turns him down for a second date. Near the finale, he is injured when the Megarangers' secret identities are exposed. During the final battle, a bandaged Jirou returns to the school and together with Erina and Mr. Ōiwa started the pep rally to cheer the Megarangers on. Afterwards, he graduates with his classmates.

===== Erina =====
Erina (恵理奈; 37, 49–51): A classmate of the Megarangers. After the Megarangers' secret identities are exposed, she is among the few people in the school who still supports the Megarangers and tried unsuccessfully to convince the school staff not to expel them. It is heavily implied she is attracted to Kenta, having looked up to him for his compassion and leadership qualities; becoming deeply depressed when he was kicked out. Ultimately with Jirou and Mr. Ooiwa she started the pep rally to cheer the Megarangers on, which would be instrumental in restoring the Megaranger's fighting spirit, contributing to their final victory against Dr. Hinelar and the Death Neziros. Afterwards, she graduates with her classmates and poses next to Kenta in the school graduation photo.

Erina is portrayed by Emi Shigemitsu (重光 絵美, Shigemitsu Emi).

==== Other allies ====
===== Takeshi =====
Takeshi (タケシ): One of the arcade children Kenta befriended. He was used by Guirail in a scheme to break Mega Red's fighting spirit by having the boy receive the end of Mega Red's punch.

Takeshi is portrayed by Yōsuke Asari (浅利 陽介, Asari Yōsuke).

===== Picot =====
Space Fairy Picot (宇宙妖精ピコット, Uchū Yosei Pikotto): Known as the "Light of Hope", Picot is a dragon-like fairy who assumes a clam-like form while traveling to a planet where he can only grant five wishes. After fulfilling the wishes, Picot leaves the planet and would eventually return to the visited planet 100,004,000 years later. Though originally chased by Helmedor, Picot becomes targeted by the Nejireians as well. While on Earth, Picot granted Miku's giant cake wish, Kyosuke's wish for katsudon, Helmedor's planet destroying laser cannon, and Kani Nejilar's wish to bring dead Psycho Nejilars back to life. After granting Kenta's wish for the Megarangers to have for energy to keep fighting, giving them their Mega Tector armor and aiding the Carrangers, Picot leaves for the next planet.

Space Fairy Picot is voiced by Fushigi Yamada (山田 ふしぎ, Yamada Fushigi).

=== Evil Electric Kingdom Nezirejia ===
The Evil Electric Kingdom Nezirejia (邪電王国ネジレジア, Jaden Ōkoku Nejirejia) (Note: Also spelt as "Nejirejia".) are invaders from another dimension ruled by an entity called Javious. Their names and appearances are all twisted and distorted. They have stationed in the Death Neziros (デスネジロ, Desu Nejiro) fortress which transforms into the giant robot Grand Neziros (グランネジロス, Guran Nejirosu) in the series finale. This robot can regenerate severed limbs as well as bind and electrocute his victims with cables and was finally destroyed along with the Mega Voyager in the finale. Hinelar self-destructed the Death Neziros from the inside in an attempt to blow up the Megarangers, the people in their high school and the Mega Voyager. The Megarangers nearly sacrifice themselves to carry Death Neziros with the Mega Voyager into the sky to prevent any further damage to their high school.

- Evil Electro-King Javious the First (邪電王ジャビウス1世, Jadenō Jabiusu Issei) (Note: Javious' name is derived from the Japanese word for "evil" (邪, Ja) and "Moebius" (メビウス, Mebiusu).) is the ruler of Nezirejia. He appears only as a giant eye on the screen of the Death Neziros. Very little is known about him and he is killed when the last of the Nejirangers, whose life forces are connected to his, are destroyed by the Megarangers. Upon his death, Javious was revealed to be the nucleus of Nejirejia which fades away upon his death. Only Javious' heart remained which Hinelar used to power his Hinelar City. Javious' heart was later destroyed along with Hinelar City.
- Dr. Hinelar (Ｄｒ．ヒネラー, Dokutā Hinerā) (Note: Dr. Hinelar's name is derived from the Japanese word for "to twist" (ひねる, Hineru).) is the leader of the Nezirejia invasion party. He was originally a cybernetics scientist named Dr. Samejima (鮫島博士, Samejima-hakase), who studied space exploring suits and lost his beloved daughter in one of his experiments, destroying his reputation and scarring him. He later worked with Kubota on an interdimensional project, being the first to discover the existence of Nezirejia. A year later, Samejima decides to enter the dimension to prove its existence in spite of Kubota's pleas not to be reckless and ends up becoming Javious', right-hand man. Kubota later realized that Dr. Hinelar and Samejima are one and the same when he recognizes that the suits of the Nejirangers are similar to the Power Suits Samejima had developed. Hinelar later plots and successfully kills Javious through the Nejirangers, to become the new high leader of the Nejirejians. After the destruction of Javious, the Nezire Dimension closes making Hinelar build Hinelar City (ヒネラーシティ, Hinerā Shiti) in which he intended to concentrate all mankind as data cards. Soon after the destruction of his city, Hinelar began his personal attack on the Megarangers after learning their identities and making sure that they become outcasts to society. But Yugande's and Shibolena's demises drove Hinelar over the edge and gained a twisted monster form to battle the Megarangers himself. However, the device that kept his body from warping on itself (a side effect from being in Nezirejia) was damaged and he retreated into the Death Neziros and turning it into Grand Neziros. When GrandNeziros exploded during the Mega Voyager's sacrifice, Hinelar dies, still inside while trying to will his body from collapsing onto itself.
- Shibolena (シボレナ, Shiborena) (Note: Shibolena's name is derived from the Japanese word for "to squeeze" (絞る, Shiboru).) is a cybernetic gynoid modeled after Hinelar's long dead daughte, Shizuka. Considers herself the masterpiece of Dr. Hinelar's work. She was second-in-command to Hinelar on the Death Neziros, a mistress of disguise and illusions. Wielding a rapier, she was also the smart one, often initiating plans for conquest. Creating Rose Nezire through her own DNA, Shibolena poses as a nun to give her offshoot's roses to children, turning them into slaves and subject them to Demon Therapy to create "Little Rose Nezire". But with one of the children being her new friend Ruri, Chisato arrives and nearly exposes herself as Mega Yellow (whom Shibolena establishes a rivalry with) to wound Shibolena with her Blade Arm. Fortunately, Mega Blue creates a holographic duplicate of Chisato to confuse Shibolena. She was critically wounded near the finale, by Mega Red, while protecting Yugande. She makes it back to the Death Neziros, to inform Hinelar of Yugande's death. Her body explodes right before Dr. Hinelar's eyes after she says goodbye to her master. The design of her hairstyle-like helmet is based on an American CG illustration used as a reference.
- Bibidevi (ビビデビ, Bibidebi) (Note: Bibidevi's name is derived from the song "Bibbidi Bobbidi Boo" (ビビデバビデブー, Bibide Babide Bū) from Walt Disney's 1950 animated adaptation of Cinderella and "devil" (デビル, Debiru).) is a little annoying imp monster that begins his sentences with "Bibi" and ends them with "debi". In episode 3, Dr. Hinelar modified him with the ability to make the Nezire Beasts grow by biting them and injecting them with a Giganto Virus (巨大化ウィルス, Kyodaika Wirusu) whenever they are destroyed or are nearing defeat at the hands of the Megarangers. In secret, Bibidevi wanted to be the head of Nejirejia and has some affection for Shibolena, secretly sending Canary Nezire to act on his behalf. He appears to have died in the Grand Neziros when it was destroyed by Mega Voyager's suicide attempt. Later, it is revealed that he teleported Hizumina out of the giant robot before the destruction.
- Yugande (ユガンデ) (Note: Yugande's name is derived from the Japanese word for "to warp" (歪む, Yugamu).) is a prideful wire-frame model-themed robot general created by Hinelar whom he admires and unconditionally obeys. He wields the Dark Thunder (ダークサンダー, Dāku Sandā) sword. Being high-strung, Yugande offers to handle the Megarangers himself. Using a divide and conquer strategy to take out the Megaranger members one by one, Yugande gets Mega Red to fight him in subspace so no one would interfere and nearly kills him before the others manage to breach the barrier. Mega Black is badly injured as they get their teammate to safety. Later, Yugande calls Mega Red out, attacking him in his enlarged form as the others arrive to aid him. Using Galaxy Mega, the Megarangers weaken him with the Saber Electromagnetic Whip before killing him with the Mega Side Cutter. However, Yugande is later rebuilt through the Nejzre Circle in a stronger form, Yugande Relive (ユガンデ・リライブ, Yugande Riraibu). But as he needs to get used to his upgrade, Yugande remained on the sidelines until the "Ultimate Lifeform" incident, attempting to exact revenge on Mega Red while the monster feeds. Though he manages to destroy Mega Red's Drill Saber and nearly kills him, Yugande is driven off by the Megarangers' Multi Attack Rifle. Later, he was critically wounded in Episode 30 when Guirail uses him as a shield to protect him from the Super Galaxy Mega's Super Galaxy Knuckle. Yugande was modified in a form called Yugande Strong (ユガンデ・ストロング, Yugande Sutorongu), with various mechanical implants placed on him to survive, and is given a better sword called the Dark Crisis (ダーククライシス, Dāku Kuraishisu), which has three buttons on its handle to activate different attacks such as Dark Blade, Dark Fire, Dark Lightning, and Dark Triple Crisis (all three attacks combined). Yugande uses a special chip to take on a more powerful, red-colored form called Burning Yugande (バーニング・ユガンデ, Bāningu Yugande). With this new power, Yugande proves to be a difficult challenge for the Megarangers, as he destroys the Delta Mega, badly damages the Galaxy Mega and Mega Winger and nearly destroys the Voyager Machines when he damages the INET Moonbase. Yugande, however, meets his end when the Nezi Reactor inside him is damaged and he is killed by Mega Red.
- Guirail (ギレール, Girēru) (Note: Guirail's name is derived from the Japanese word for "to cut" (切れる, Kireru).) is a bandaged warrior was one of Javious' trusted minions, he is sent to Earth to aid Hinelar with the Megarangers. Guirail used crueler methods than Dr. Hinelar's (an example of this is in his first appearance where he used children as shields), even performing unusual experiments on the Nezire Beasts. Prior to revealing himself to Hinelar's group, Guirail stages an attack to capture the children of a city district while breaking Kenta's will to fight by having him hit Takeshi by accident. However, while leading a new attack on a communication building, Guirail messes with Mega Red until he is beaten by him with the Battle Rizer. Later on, he infected Yugande to become Giga-Guirail (ギガギレール, Giga Girēru). But when the Super Galaxy Mega used its Super Galaxy Knuckle attack, Guirail canceled out the fusion to use Yugande as a shield to protect himself. An angry Shibolena tries to kill him but Dr. Hinelar stopped and tricked Guirail into taking the Nezire Source Capsule that gives him tremendous power and robs him of his sanity. This mutated Guirail into an insane beast called Mad Guirail (マッドギレール, Maddo Girēru) who was so powerful that the Super Galaxy Mega was no match for it. Using full power, the Super Galaxy Mega only caused him to break off a piece of his body that formed into Gigire. The Megarangers were able to escape to the INET Moonbase on the Delta Mega where Yuusaku gave them the Voyager Machines. In the end, Gigire, and later Mad Guirail, were the first two to be killed by the Mega Voyager.
- Hizumina (ヒズミナ; Gingaman vs. Megaranger) (Note: Hizumina's name comes from the Japanese word for "to distort" (歪む, Hizumu), which can also be read as "Yugamu" – the base for Yugande's name.) is the last of Hinelar's creations and Shibolena's "Younger Sister", mostly identical save for her armor being purplish. She secretly wished to revive Hinelar having grown to miss him with Shibolena's memories, but was betrayed by Gregory when participating in reviving the Balban space pirates. Surviving the treachery, Hizumina attempts to take advantage of the fight to kill the Megarangers, only to be ultimately killed by Mega Red.
- Kunekune (クネクネ) (Note: The Kunekune's name is derived from the Japanese word for "wringling" (くねくね, Kunekune).) are Nezirejia's caterpillar-like grunts, having twisted faces and using twisted blades as their weapons. They are also able to assume human form.
  - Boss Kunekune (ボスクネクネ, Bosu Kunekune): A black-headed version of the Kunekune able to fire energy from his hands. Posing as a police officer, Boss Kunekune leads his Nezire Army into taking over the Yuhigaoka Apartment Building in the H Ward as part of a plan to secretly replace every person on Earth with Kunekune. When the Megarangers uncover the plan, the Kunekune attempt to kill off Mega Red and Mega Pink with their massive numbers before Boss Kunekune arrives to finish them off. However, after being defeated by Mega Red's Drill Sniper Custom, Boss Kunekune calls his army to group around him to form King Kunekune (キングクネクネ, Kingu Kunekune), with his head in the heart area. Because he was composed of many Kunekune, King Kunekune could close wounds in seconds. When Boss Kunekune was destroyed by the Galaxy Mega with the Booster Rifle, King Kunekune disassembled in the explosion.

==== Nezirangers ====
The Jaden Sentai Neziranger (邪電戦隊ネジレンジャー, Jaden Sentai Nejirenjā) are cyborgs that were created by Dr. Hinelar from Javious I's DNA as evil counterparts to the Megarangers. Their suits are similar to power suits that Dr. Hinelar had developed back when he was known as Samejima. They share an attack called Neji Energy Attack. Unfortunately, the Nezirangers were impatient and wanted nothing more than to kill their Megaranger counterparts. The Nezirangers were used by Hinelar not only to kill the Megarangers in suicide attacks, but also to kill Javious by slowly draining him of his "life energy" which they siphoned. When badly damaged or enlarged, they transformed into their monstrous true forms. The Nezirangers' urge to kill managed to keep them from dying as they used Hinelar's data-card machine to regain physical form. They not only resume their original goal, but also to try to kill Hinelar for using them in the first place. The Megarangers manage to digitize them, preserving them as Data Cards, which were destroyed along with Hinelar City.

- Nezi Red (ネジレッド, Neji Reddo) is the leader and most arrogant of the Nezirangers who wields the Nezi Saber (ネジセイバー, Neji Seibā). His true form of Nezi Phantom (ネジファントム, Neji Fantomu) is a fire monster with pyrokinetic abilities. Once turned on Dr. Hinelar when he discovered that the Nezirangers were mere pawns in Hinelar's plans, but had his free will removed. Killed by Super Galaxy Mega, Mega Voyager and Mega Winger, & was later turned into a Data Card.
- Nezi Black (ネジブラック, Neji Burakku) is the fiercest member of the five who wields the Nezi Rod (ネジロッド, Neji Roddo). His true form of Nezi Vulgar (ネジヴァルガー, Neji Varugā) is a rock monster that can use a rock-like tentacle. Killed by Super Galaxy Mega, Mega Voyager and Mega Winger, & was later turned into a Data Card.
- Nezi Blue (ネジブルー, Neji Burū) wields the Nezi Tomahawk (ネジトマホーク, Neji Tomahōku). As the most sadistic of the five, he became obsessed with specifically fighting and killing Mega Blue. His true form of Nezi Bizzare (ネジビザール, Neji Bizāru) is a crystalline ice monster with freezing abilities. Killed by Wing Mega Voyager, & was later turned into a Data Card.
- Nezi Yellow (ネジイエロー, Neji Ierō) wields the Nezi Sling (ネジスリング, Neji Suringu). She is the most cunning member and rival of Nezi Pink. Her true form of Nezi Sophia (ネジソフィア, Neji Sofia) is a spider monster with the ability to control electronics or anything powered by electricity, most notably taking control over the Mega Voyager. Killed by Super Galaxy Mega, Mega Voyager and Mega Winger, & was later turned into a Data Card.
- Nezi Pink (ネジピンク, Neji Pinku) is the most brutal member who wields the Nezi Arrow (ネジアロー, Neji Arō). After making a bet with Nezi Yellow to see which one of them would take away the mask of their respective Megaranger counterpart and bring it back, Nezi Pink faced off against both Mega Yellow and Mega Pink who defeated her with a Capture Sniper and Blade Arm combo. Unfortunately, Nezi Pink managed to show them her true form of Nezi Jealous (ネジジェラス, Neji Jerasu), a plant monster who gave Mega Voyager and Mega Winger a hard battle. With Mega Silver using Mega Winger as a shield while the Megarangers channeled all of Mega Voyager's power into their Voyager Spartan, they managed to use the super-powered Voyager Spartan to finally destroy Nezi Jealous. Was later turned into a Data Card.

==== Nezire Beasts ====
The Nezire Beasts (ネジレ獣, Nejirejū; Twist Beasts) are monsters created by Dr. Hinelar when a Nezire Egg, a capsule holding genetically altered DNA, is placed on the Nezire Magic Circle (ネジレ魔法陣, Nejire Mahōjin) and exposed to great amounts of energy, twisting and twirling while Shibolena chants a spell, "Twist and Turn. Assume physical form". Once the process is complete, a Nezire Beast is born and fully matured. There is always some part on the body of the Nezire Beast that is twisted.

- Ei Nezire (エイネジレ, Ei Nejire; 2): The first Nezire Beast to be sent down to earth, attacking the Musashi district. The Ei Nezire could fly through space as well as fire laser blasts from his eyes. Kenta held the monster at bay until the rest of team arrives. Wounded by Mega Red with the Drill Saber, Ei Nezire retreated into the Nezi Crusher, killed off when Galaxy Mega destroyed the giant machine.
- Sai Nezire (サイネジレ, Sai Nejire; 3, 21): This Nezire could create earthquakes when he walked as well as drill through large buildings with the drill on his face. Rhino Nezire could also deflect blasts from the drill when it was spinning fast. Rhino Nezire was sent to flush out the Megarangers, attacking the CG Center where Shun was located. Though Kenta attempted to keep him way from Shun Namiki while he was saving his program, Rhino Nezire destroyed the disc when Shun decided to save Kenta and fight alongside the team. Though defeated by MegaRed's Screw Drill Saber/Saber Slash combo, Dr. Hinelar arrives with the modified Bibidevi to infect the Nezire Beast with the Enlarging Virus integrated in Bibidevi's DNA. In the end, the Galaxy Mega destroyed it with Mega Flying Cutter.
- Chameleon Nezire (カメレオンネジレ, Kamereon Nejire; 4): This Nezire was used by Shibolena to project her image across the internet with the digital camera on his shoulder, which in the process would take control of people and have them undergo "Nezirian Teaching" to make them into blood-thirsty sadists. After freeing Miss Nishiyama from the mind control with Kouichirou unconscious, Shun managed to pinpoint the address, only to fall into a trap as they were sucked into a pocket dimension where Chameleon Nezire is omnipotent as he electrocuted the four. Koichiro managed to find the real location and battled Chameleon Nezire, overwhelmed by the monster's camouflage until Mega Black use Satellite Searcher to negate the effect and managed to free the others. The others arrived in time and used their Final Shoot attack to defeat the Chameleon Nezire. Bibidevi arrived soon afterwards and infected Chameleon Nezire into a giant, only to be killed by Galaxy Mega's Saber Electromagnetic Whip and Mega Dash Cutter. However, only the Nezire's arm remained with a shard from the Mega Saber in it.
- Ebi Nezire (エビネジレ, Ebi Nejire; 5, 21): This Nezire, able to launch his pinchers like boomerangs, had his DNA modified with the shard of the MegaSaber found from Chameleon Nezire's remains, making his shell impervious to the Galaxy Mega's sword. He attacked the volcanic mountainside to lure out the Megarangers and allowed himself to be infected by Bibidevi. The programmed Galaxy Mega arrives, only to be overpowered as Shrimp Nezire attempted to send it into the volcano. Once the Megarangers regained control, the GalaxyMega turned the tables and ripped the Nezire's whiskers off. Using the Saber Electromagnetic Whip, the Galaxy Mega grabbed Shrimp Nezire and threw him into the volcano to destroy him.
- Zou Nezire (ゾウネジレ, Zō Nejire; 6): This Nezire possessed superhuman strength, ideal for his mission to knock over an energy system tower in an act of terrorism, resulting with the building's generator undergoing a meltdown that would destroy the city. With Miku in the tower, Mega Black and Mega Blue had to deal with Elephant Nezire while Mega Red and Chisato used the Digi Tank to get her and Shintaro out of the building before taking the cooling the energy rods to stop the meltdown. By then, Elephant Nezire was enlarged by Bibidevi and tore the tower down as the Digi Tank escaped. With Mega Pink, the Megarangers formed the Galaxy Mega and defeated the Nezire with swift punches before killing him with Galaxy Mega's Mega Flying Cutter attack.
- Hachi Nezire (ハチネジレ, Hachi Nejire; 7, 21): A stealth Nezire Beast Shibolena sends into space to cause lightning to strike down on every major city in the world. This Nezire Beast could also shoot beams from his eyes and launch a barrage of Space Bees from his "hive blade" on his hand. As Mega Red and the others investigate the Van Allen belt, Kouchirou and Chisato uncover Shibolena's plan to use the mind-controlled staff at the Space Observation Center and other space centers to create an Attack Dispersion Net which Hachi Nezire would use to take out every city at one time. He is then blasted back to Earth with the Final Shoot and defeated with the Digital Combination. After being bitten by Bibidevi, Hachi Nezire battles Galaxy Mega and is destroyed by the Booster Rifle.
- Koumori Nezire (コウモリネジレ, Koumori Nejire; 9): A Nezire Beast that could manipulate sound and signals. Koumori Nezire uses his bats to burns a special soundwave into CDs that cause those who hear it to commit acts of violence without any memory of it as part of Shibolena's plan to perfect brainwashing of humanity. When Saeko learned of it and attempts to gather the CDs, Shibolena sends Koumori Nezire after her to force her to commit suicide. But Chisato manages to free Saeko from Koumori Nezire's hold before she joins the fight against him, overpowering him by using the Mega Sling to defeat him. After being bitten by Bibidevi, Koumori Nezire attempts to overpower Galaxy Mega with his soundwaves until Saeko's intervention allows Galaxy Mega to destroy Koumori Nezire with the Mega Cross Cutter.
  - Neo Koumori Nezire (ネオコウモリネジレ, Neo Koumori Nejire; 10): Koumori Nezire's remains were gathered and he was recreated. With a series of female androids at his disposal, Neo Koumori Nezire provides them with flutes and send them across the world to play the Murderous Soundwave, an enhanced version of the Rage Soundwave. However, one of his robots, Number 167 who looks exactly like Shun's deceased mother, develops a mind of her own as a result of being hit by a truck. Attempting too destroy her, he is forced to fallback after Mega Blue overpowers her. Tracking his creation down, Neo Koumori Nezire uses his Murderous Soundwaves on the Megarangers until 167 comes to their aid and uses Shun's flute to negate the Nezire Beast's attack before she self-destructs to protect him. Enraged, Mega Blue attacks Neo Koumori Nezire in full fury before defeating him with the Tomahawk Sniper. Once enlarged by Bibidevi, Neo Koumori Nezire is easily destroyed by Galaxy Mega's Mega Dash Cutter.
- Bara Nezire (バラネジレ, Bara Nejire; 11): This Nezire was partially created from Shibolena's DNA, linking them via the rose on Shibolena's rapier. As a result, Bara Nezire could recover from any wound as long as Shibolena was all right. While Chisato goes off after Shibolena, the other Megarangers have a hard time fighting Bara Nezire who whips the Megarangers with her vines and blast them with her shoulder flowers. Deciding to finish the fight, Bara Nezire allows Bibidevi to bite her and she overpowers Galaxy Mega. However, when Mega Yellow destroys Shibolena's rose, Bara Nezire loses her advantage and is destroyed by Galaxy Mega's Galaxy Lance.
- Mogura Nezire (モグラネジレ, Mogura Nejire; 12): This subterranean-combat Nezire builds a machine to attract a piece of a heat-guiding meteor to Tokyo to use its energy to destroy the city in one blow. Managing to overpower Mega Black, but losing a fragment of the meteor, Mogura Nezire falls back and later abducts Mr. Ooiwa and Mega Black. With Mega Black regaining his composure, he saves Ooiwa and fights Mogura Nezire as the others arrive and destroy Mogura Nezire's base. Mega Black then breaks Mogura Nezire's claws off and was about to kill him when Bibidevi intervenes and bites the Nezire Beast. With Mega Black piloting Galaxy Mega, Mogura Nezire is destroyed by the giant robot's Galaxy Lance.
- Fukurou Nezire (フクロウネジレ, Fukurō Nejire; 15): This Nezire could hypnotize people and blind/blast them with harsh rays from his large eyes. Fukurou Nezire infiltrates Gojounin Academy's Digital Research to brainwash the genius students through their monitors and have them build digital blueprints for a weapon of mass destruction, which he builds within the school's basement. Investigating the school as a favor to his friend Souichi, who is possessed by the Nezire Beast, Shun uncovers Fukurou Nezire's plan and fakes being hypnotized to sabotage the weapon. Enraged at being tricked, Fukurou Nezire battles the Megarangers until they defeat him with the Digital Formation. After being bitten by Bibidevi and bursting out the school, Fukurou Nezire battles Galaxy Mega. Improvising a counterattack, Mega Blue places a mirror coating on Galaxy Mega's Mega Shield to deflect the attack back at Nezire Beast's eyes before the robot uses the Mega Dash Cutter attack to finish him off.
- Dokuga Nezire (ドクガネジレ, Dokuga Nejire; 16, 21): A Nezire Beast that is fed Hinelar's Nezire Poison, a deadly toxin he is immune to, which takes effect after 24 hours. He is to spread it around to kill as many as he can. Dokuga Nezire flies around the city, distributing the Nezire Poison on his wings, with the Megarangers affected along with 10,000 people and have until 6 pm to find an antidote. After a brief falling out, the Megarangers regroup and manage to break off a piece of antenna as the poison takes effect on them with Mega Black managing to deliver the item to INET to prepares an antidote from the Nezire Beast's immunity. By the time the Megarangers almost lose to Dokuga Nezire without their Mega Suits, they receive the antidote. Using the Drill Sniper Custom and Multi Attack Rifle, they defeat Dokuga Nezire as Bibidevi arrives to bite him. After ripping off his wing and learning that his death would cover the entire city, Galaxy Mega takes Dokuga Nezire into space and uses the Booster Rifle to destroy him.
- Gama Nezire (ガマネジレ, Gama Nejire; 17, 21): A Nezire Beast that appears in Tochigi's Rindou Lake while the Megarangers were on a field trip as one of hundreds of eggs which Bibidevi was sent to mature with a red-liquid acceleration gun and deal with the Megarangers through a blue-liquid retrograde gun. However, after Bibidevi drops the acceleration gun into the lake during the fight after blasting Miku with it my mistake, it causes one of the eggs to quickly mature. Wielding the acceleration and retrograde guns, Gama Nezire was about to mature his siblings when the Megarangers led by the enhanced Super Mega Pink arrive and destroy the eggs. After being spirited off by Shibolena, Gama Nezire decides to use his acceleration gun to cause a volcanic eruption to call out the Megarangers and exact his revenge on them. Suffering side effects from her enhancement, Super Mega Pink eventually arrives to her team's aid and teams with Mega Yellow to defeat Gama Nezire to return to normal. After being bitten by Bibidevi, Gama Nezire is caught off guard by Galaxy Mega's Super Denji Snake before being destroyed by the Mega Flying Cutter attack.
- Kinoko Nezire (キノコネジレ, Kinoko Nejire; 18): A Nezire Beast that appears in the Nasu Plateau to burn down a forest to for the Nezirejians to obtain a meteor that fell there years ago. Confronted by Mega Black, Kinoko Nezire battles the Megarangers until the forest boy's interference drives them out of the forest. After having his wounds healed, Kinoko Nezire resumes his attack as a giant before Galaxy Mega appears destroy him with the Mega Straight Cutter attack.
- Sasori Nezire (サソリネジレ, Sasori Nejire; 19): A Nejire Beast used by Shibolena to use his stinger to brainwash the children Guirail captured for his plan to take out a communications building. Though held off by Guirail, Mega Red defeats Sasori Nezire with the Battle Rizer to break his hold over the children. Bitten by Bibidevi, Sasori Nezire is destroyed by Galaxy Mega's Mega Dash Cutter.
- Wani Nezire 1 and 2 (ワニネジレ1&2, Wani Nejire 1 and 2; 20): Created by Shibolena, the Nezire Beast was modified by Guirail against her wishes to split into two separate monsters: The tail-armed Wani Nezire 1 and the head-armed Wani Nezire 2. Catching the Megarangers off guard, Wani Nezire fights them until Bibidevi bites him and then splits after being hit by Galaxy Mega's Mega Flying Cutter. The splintered monster overpowers Galaxy Mega until the completed Delta Mega arrives to even the odds as the two robots destroy the Wani Nezires with their fire power.
- Mukade Nezire (ムカデネジレ, Mukade Nejire; 21): A Nezire Beast used by Guirail in a plan to pirate Delta Mega with the Grand Neziros. "Resurrecting" fallen Nezire Beasts, Mukade Nezire enlarges as his revived Nezires overwhelm the Megarangers, to keep them from using Galaxy Mega and force Mega Red to call Delta Mega, springing Guirail's trap. Managing to form Super Galaxy Mega to break Nezirejia's hold over Delta Mega, the Megarangers use their newly formed robot to destroy Mukade Nezire, causing his revived Nezires to dissolve away, in the process.
- Airjigoku Nezire (アリジゴクネジレ, Arijigoku Nejire; 22): This Nezire could create holes in the ground that would trap victims who fell into them. Killed by Super Galaxy Mega.
- Ankou Nezire (アンコウネジレ, Ankō Nejire; 23): This Nezire Beast could turn people into stone with the antennae on his head. He was sent to absorb his younger sibling Komutan on Earth (who'd been befriend by Kenta) to reach his full potential and power. Killed by Super Galaxy Mega.
- Buffalo Nezire (バッファローネジレ, Baffarō Nejire; 24): A dummy of the superstrong Nezire Beast was sent by Yugande to record the data on the Megarangers on the gem on its head, which survived the dummy's destruction and was inserted into the real Nezire Beast later in the same episode. Using it, Buffalo Nezire could deflect any attacks the Megarangers tried to inflict on him. His arrival signified the arrival of Mega Silver, whose moves were not analyzed by the dummy so the real Buffalo Nezire had no defense against his attacks. Killed by Super Galaxy Mega.
- Utsubo Nezire (ウツボネジレ, Utsubo Nejire; 25): A Nezire species that was being bred by Guirail. Their mission was to poison the humans' water supply on Earth. The original creature was red, but a blue-colored clone was later created, seen, and used by Guirail. The blue one was killed by Super Galaxy Mega, while the red one was killed by Mega Silver (who shot Bibidevi before he could bite it too).
- Semi Nezire (セミネジレ, Semi Nejire; 26): A renegade Nezire who stole a device to amplify its power. This Nezire could blast powerful sound waves and was very treacherous, not unlike Guirail. Killed by Super Galaxy Mega.
- Sango Nezire (サンゴネジレ, Sango Nejire; 27): A Nezire that could slowly transform people into coral, which would eventually kill them in the process. Killed by Super Galaxy Mega.
- Shiroari Nezire (シロアリネジレ, Shiroari Nejire; 28): A Nezire who could lay eggs and power them up to grow quickly. Killed by the combined efforts of Mega Red, Mega Black, Mega Blue, Mega Pink and Mega Silver. Her larvae, however, hatched and fused together to become Soldier Shiroari Nezire. This Nezire was stronger that his mother, and could turn into a swarm of termites to eat through anything (including the Megarangers weapons) and/or avoid the Megaranger's attacks. Killed by Super Galaxy Mega with a combination of using the Booster Rifle set on freezing gas and then using Super Galaxy Knuckle.
- Buta Nezire (ブタネジレ, Buta Nejire; 29): A monster who created and sold special "Diet Crêpes", while disguised as a chef, that actually induced people to eat anything nearby. While he was a formidable monster despite being quite comical, ButaNezire's weakness was hunger. He would abandon a fight, even if he was winning, to look for food if he became hungry. Killed by Super Galaxy Mega.

===== Psycho Nezilar =====
The Psycho Nezilar (サイコネジラー, Saiko Nejirā) are more powerful monsters that Doctor Hinelar creates using his "piano." What makes them different from the Nezire Beasts is that they are more robotic and have a heightened psychotic nature.

- Lion Nezilar (ライオンネジラー, Raion Nejirā; 33, Megaranger vs Carranger): A superstrong Psycho Nezilar who could blast the Megarangers with his large cannon and could detonate bombs if the Megarangers attacked him. Mega Red, with an upgrade to his Battle Raizer, was able to use this new energy to power up his Drill Sniper Custom into the Super Drill Sniper Custom, allowing him to kill Lion Nezilar fast enough before he could detonate any of his bombs. Killed by Mega Voyager. Was resurrected by Kani Nezilar, killed by the Mega Tector powered Megarangers.
- Yamaarashi Nezilar (ヤマアラシネジラー, Yamaarashi Nejirā; 34, Megaranger vs Carranger): A Psycho Nezilar who could turn soccer balls into explosive devices and kick them at humans to blow them up. Was resurrected by Kani Nezilar, killed by the Mega Tector powered Megarangers.
- Kamakiri Nezilar (カマキリネジラー, Kamakiri Nejirā; 35, Megaranger vs Carranger): A Psycho Nezilar that took advantage of Mega Silver's short transformation weakness by affixing a time bomb to him set to go off when he reverted to normal. However, Mega Silver managed to upgrade his powers so he no longer had the time limit and was able to defeat him. Killed by Mega Voyager. Was resurrected by Kani Nezilar, killed by the Mega Tector powered Megarangers.
- Condor Nezilar (コンドルネジラー, Kondoru Nejirā; 36, Megaranger vs Carranger): A Psycho Nezilar that could fly really fast and blast enemies with his beak lasers. First to be killed by Wing Mega Voyager. Was resurrected by Kani Nezilar, killed by the Mega Tector powered Megarangers.
- Canary Nezilar (カナリアネジラー, Kanaria Nejirā; 37): A Psycho Nezilar that had an "exchanging beam," allowing him to swap something he had for something someone else had, like his "old man" voice for Chisato's voice and goofy objects for the Megarangers' weapons. Kanaria Nezilar was sent by an unappreciated Bibidedi and stole Chisato's voice. Killed by Wing Mega Voyager.
- Tokage Nezilar (トカゲネジラー, Tokage Nejirā; 39, Megaranger vs Carranger): A Psycho Nezilar with a satellite-like frill on his neck who could photograph the Megarangers through their helmets threatening to blackmail them, although it didn't work. He could also blast lasers from his mouth. Killed by Wing Mega Voyager. Was resurrected by Kani Nezilar, killed by the Mega Tector powered Megarangers.
- Kani Nezilar (カニネジラー, Kani Nejirā; Megaranger vs Carranger): Had a high-pressure water cannon concealed in his claw firing his "Crab Bubble" attack, and a strong shell on his back that could deflect his opponent's attacks. Killed by Wing Mega Voyager.
- Togebari Nezilar (トゲバリネジラー, Togebari Nejirā; 45): A thorn-covered plant-themed Psycho Nezilar whose power grew stronger from the thorns on his hand. It attached a small, mind-controlling earring to people, including Kenta and his classmate Shintaro, causing them to serve Dr. Hinelar and attack their friends. This happened until Kouichirou and the others destroyed the earrings. When Thorn-Needle Nezilar's thorns were destroyed, he lost most of his power and was able to be killed by Mega Voyager.
- Maboroshi Nezilar (マボロシネジラー, Maboroshi Nejirā; 46): This kaleidoscope-themed Psycho Nezilar could make himself disappear and reappear in various locations. At one point, he confused the Megarangers by going to the southern end of Japan, and then back to Sapporo only to appear behind them afterwards. Killed by Mega Voyager.
- Tensou Nezilar (マボロシネジラー, Tensō Nejirā; 47): An antenna Psycho Nezilar who could suck up earthlings in his vacuum-like laser and transport them into Hinelar City. Killed by Mega Voyager.
- Jigoku Nezilar (ジゴクネジラー, Jigoku Nejirā; 49): A bat/Grim Reaper-designed Psycho Nezilar who was created to force the Megarangers to expose themselves in their High School, which they did. Though he died at the hands of Mega Voyager, he did manage to turn the heroes' schoolmates and friends against them.

===== Other Beasts =====
- Ultimate Lifeform (究極生命体, Kyūkyoku Seimeitai; 13): The result of the Tanaka Project to produce an artificial creature which can endure in outer space and feed on energy from its feelers, almost all research relating to the entity was destroyed except a pendant containing an IC Chip holding the DNA sequence. After Shibolena acquires it, she use the data to create a Nezire Beast so that it would destroy humanity after absorbing enough electricity. After losing one of its feelers to the Megarangers, the Ultimate Lifeform enlarges and battles Galaxy Mega until it is destroyed by the robot's Mega Flash Arrow.
- Gigire (ギギレ, Girēru; 31 & 32): A squid-like monster grown from a fragment of Mad Guirail who could fly through space and blast a powerful laser from his forehead. Both of them were destroyed by the Mega Voyager.

== Episodes ==
On April 6, 1997, (The day that Episode 8 aired) the show later began to air on Sunday mornings at 7.30 am JST instead of late afternoons on a Friday. This would remain the regular time slot for Super Sentai shows until October 2017.

| No. | Title | Directed by | Written by | Original release date |
|---|---|---|---|---|
| 1 | "Don't Let Them! The Twisted Invaders"; Transliteration: "Yurusu na! Nejireta Shinryakusha" (Japanese: ゆるすな！ねじれた侵略者) | Takao Nagaishi | Junki Takegami | February 14, 1997 |
| 2 | "Look! Our Galaxy Mega"; Transliteration: "Mite Kure! Oretachi no Gyarakushī Mega" (Japanese: 見てくれ！俺たちのギャラクシーメガ) | Takao Nagaishi | Junki Takegami | February 21, 1997 |
| 3 | "For Real! A Huge Nezire Beast"; Transliteration: "Maji ka yo! Dekkai Nejirejū" (Japanese: マジかよ！でっかいネジレ獣) | Noboru Takemoto | Junki Takegami | February 28, 1997 |
| 4 | "Smash it! Shibolena's Trap"; Transliteration: "Kudaku zo! Shiborena no Wana" (Japanese: 砕くぞ！シボレナの罠) | Noboru Takemoto | Naruhisa Arakawa | March 7, 1997 |
| 5 | "Finish It! This Is an Underhanded Battle"; Transliteration: "Kimeru ze! Kore ga Urawaza Batoru" (Japanese: キメるぜ! これが裏技バトル) | Ryuta Tasaki | Junki Takegami | March 14, 1997 |
| 6 | "We Did It! The Roaring Digitank"; Transliteration: "Yatta ne! Bakusō Dejitanku" (Japanese: やったね！爆走デジタンク) | Ryuta Tasaki | Junki Takegami | March 21, 1997 |
| 7 | "What's This? The Clingy, Bothersome Girl"; Transliteration: "Nan na no? Okkake Meiwaku Musume" (Japanese: ナンなの？おっかけ迷惑娘) | Takao Nagaishi | Naruhisa Arakawa | March 28, 1997 |
| 8 | "I Can't Lose! Turnabout Teamwork"; Transliteration: "Makeru ka! Gyakuten Chīmuwāku" (Japanese: 負けるか！逆転チームワーク) | Takao Nagaishi | Junki Takegami | April 6, 1997 |
| 9 | "Exposed! The Demon-Filled CD"; Transliteration: "Abaku zo! Mamono ga Hisomu Shī Dī" (Japanese: あばくぞ！魔物がひそむＣＤ) | Noboru Takemoto | Junki Takegami | April 13, 1997 |
| 10 | "Farewell! Sorrowful Android"; Transliteration: "Sayonara! Kanashimi no Andoroido" (Japanese: さよなら！哀しみのアンドロイド) | Noboru Takemoto | Naruhisa Arakawa | April 20, 1997 |
| 11 | "Look Out! The Lure of the Red Rose"; Transliteration: "Abunai! Akai Bara no Yūwaku" (Japanese: あぶない！赤いバラの誘惑) | Ryuta Tasaki | Naruhisa Arakawa | April 27, 1997 |
| 12 | "What a Pain! Our Lazybones Teacher"; Transliteration: "Komaru ze! Warera ga Gūtara Sensei" (Japanese: こまるぜ！我らがぐうたら先生) | Ryuta Tasaki | Junki Takegami | May 4, 1997 |
| 13 | "Heartthrob! Our Teacher Is Like the Wind"; Transliteration: "Dokidoki! Sensei wa Kaze no You ni" (Japanese: どきどき！先生は風のように) | Takao Nagaishi | Junki Takegami | May 11, 1997 |
| 14 | "Surprise! The Neighbors are Nejirejians"; Transliteration: "Bikkuri! Otonari wa Nejirejia" (Japanese: びっくり！おとなりはネジレジア) | Takao Nagaishi | Junki Takegami | May 18, 1997 |
| 15 | "See Through It! The Mecha of Genius High"; Transliteration: "Mi Yabure! Tensai Kōkō no Karakuri" (Japanese: 見やぶれ！天才高校のカラクリ) | Masato Tsujino | Shigeru Yanagawa | May 25, 1997 |
| 16 | "Very Bad! Will We Die?"; Transliteration: "Gekiyaba! Oretachi Shinu no ka?" (Japanese: 激ヤバ！オレたち死ぬのか？) | Masato Tsujino | Yasuko Kobayashi | June 1, 1997 |
| 17 | "Too Cool!? The Awesome Super Miku"; Transliteration: "Sugosugi!? Iketeru Sūpā Miku" (Japanese: すごすぎ！?いけてるスーパーみく) | Ryuta Tasaki | Naruhisa Arakawa | June 8, 1997 |
| 18 | "Protect it! The Mysterious Boy's Forest"; Transliteration: "Mamoru zo! Fushigi na Shōnen no Mori" (Japanese: 守るぞ！不思議な少年の森) | Ryuta Tasaki | Naruhisa Arakawa | June 15, 1997 |
| 19 | "Drive It In! The Invincible Deadly Punch"; Transliteration: "Uchikome! Fukutsu no Hissatsu Panchi" (Japanese: 打ちこめ！不屈の必殺パンチ) | Takao Nagaishi | Junki Takegami | June 22, 1997 |
| 20 | "Counting On You! The New Robo: Delta Mega"; Transliteration: "Tanomu ze! Shin Robo Deruta Mega" (Japanese: たのむぜ！新ロボデルタメガ) | Takao Nagaishi | Junki Takegami | June 29, 1997 |
| 21 | "Now's The Time! The Life-Threatening Super-Fusion"; Transliteration: "Ima Koso! Inochi o Kaketa Chō Gattai" (Japanese: いまこそ！命をかけた超合体) | Takao Nagaishi | Junki Takegami | July 6, 1997 |
| 22 | "Escape! Labyrinth of Evil"; Transliteration: "Nukedese! Akuma no Rabirinsu" (Japanese: ぬけ出せ！悪魔のラビリンス) | Masato Tsujino | Naruhisa Arakawa | July 20, 1997 |
| 23 | "Why! My Egg is a Nezire Beast"; Transliteration: "Nande da! Ore no Tamago wa Nejirejū" (Japanese: なんでだ！オレのたまごはネジレ獣) | Masato Tsujino | Shigeru Yanagawa | July 27, 1997 |
| 24 | "Running Solo! A Silvery New Face"; Transliteration: "Dokusō! Gin'iro no Nyū Feisu" (Japanese: 独走！銀色のニューフェイス) | Ryuta Tasaki | Yasuko Kobayashi | August 3, 1997 |
| 25 | "Just in Time! Time Limit: 2.5 Minutes"; Transliteration: "Girigiri! Taimu Rimitto Nifunhan" (Japanese: ギリギリ！タイムリミット２分半) | Ryuta Tasaki | Yasuko Kobayashi | August 10, 1997 |
| 26 | "Really!? The End of Nezirejia"; Transliteration: "Honto ka!? Nejirejia no Saigo" (Japanese: ホントか!？ネジレジアの最期) | Takao Nagaishi | Yasuko Kobayashi | August 17, 1997 |
| 27 | "Kick Them About! The Demonic Coral of Death"; Transliteration: "Kechirase! Shi o Yobu Ma no Sango" (Japanese: けちらせ！死を呼ぶ魔のサンゴ) | Takao Nagaishi | Junki Takegami | August 24, 1997 |
| 28 | "Give Up! The Explosive Granny Whirlwind"; Transliteration: "Oteage! Bakuretsu Obaachan Senpū" (Japanese: おてあげ！爆裂おばあちゃん旋風) | Masato Tsujino | Naruhisa Arakawa | August 31, 1997 |
| 29 | "I Want to Lose Weight! Miku's Dubious Diet"; Transliteration: "Yasetai! Miku no Ayashii Daietto" (Japanese: やせたい！みくの怪しいダイエット) | Masato Tsujino | Shigeru Yanagawa | September 7, 1997 |
| 30 | "Full Throttle! The Friendship Combination"; Transliteration: "Sakuretsu! Yūjō no Konbinēshon" (Japanese: サク烈！友情のコンビネーション) | Ryuta Tasaki | Junki Takegami | September 14, 1997 |
| 31 | "Stop it! Out of Control Guirail"; Transliteration: "Tomeru ze! Girēru no Bōsō" (Japanese: 止めるぜ！ギレールの暴走) | Ryuta Tasaki | Yasuko Kobayashi | September 21, 1997 |
| 32 | "Is It the End!? Desperate Situation, Galaxy Mega"; Transliteration: "Owari ka!? Zettai Zetsumei Gyarakushī Mega" (Japanese: 終わりか！？絶体絶命ギャラクシーメガ) | Ryuta Tasaki | Yasuko Kobayashi | September 28, 1997 |
| 33 | "Giddy! The Girlfriend From the Moon"; Transliteration: "Ukiuki! Tsuki Kara Kita Koibito" (Japanese: ウキウキ！月から来た恋人) | Takao Nagaishi | Naruhisa Arakawa | October 5, 1997 |
| 34 | "I'll Show You! Big Bro's Miracle Shoot"; Transliteration: "Miseru ze! Aniki no Mirakuru Shūto" (Japanese: 見せるぜ！兄貴のミラクルシュート) | Takao Nagaishi | Shigeru Yanagawa | October 12, 1997 |
| 35 | "Overcome! Mega Silver's Greatest Crisis"; Transliteration: "Norikire! Mega Shirubā Saidai no Kiki" (Japanese: のりきれ！メガシルバー最大の危機) | Masato Tsujino | Yasuko Kobayashi | October 19, 1997 |
| 36 | "Fly! The Universe's Dancing Wings of Hope"; Transliteration: "Habatake! Sora ni Mau Kibō no Tsubasa" (Japanese: はばたけ！宇宙(そら)に舞う希望の翼) | Masato Tsujino | Yasuko Kobayashi | October 26, 1997 |
| 37 | "Why? Chisato's Old Man's Voice"; Transliteration: "Dōshite? Chisato ga Oyaji-goe" (Japanese: どうして？千里がオヤジ声) | Ryuta Tasaki | Naruhisa Arakawa | November 2, 1997 |
| 38 | "Scary! Nezirejia's Fiendish Squadron"; Transliteration: "Senritsu! Nejirejia no Kyōaku Sentai" (Japanese: 戦慄！ネジレジアの凶悪戦隊) | Ryuta Tasaki | Junki Takegami | November 16, 1997 |
| 39 | "Exposed! Mega Red's True Identity"; Transliteration: "Bareta ze! Mega Reddo no Shōtai" (Japanese: バレたぜ！メガレッドの正体) | Takao Nagaishi | Junki Takegami | November 23, 1997 |
| 40 | "Scary! Bad Women"; Transliteration: "Kowai ze! Baddo na Onnatachi" (Japanese: コワいぜ！バッドな女たち) | Takao Nagaishi | Yasuko Kobayashi | November 30, 1997 |
| 41 | "Snapped! The Blue Terror, Nezi Blue"; Transliteration: "Kirete 'ru! Ao no Kyōfu Neji Burū" (Japanese: キレてる！青の恐怖ネジブルー) | Masato Tsujino | Yasuko Kobayashi | December 7, 1997 |
| 42 | "Lose Them! The Evil Pursuers"; Transliteration: "Furikire! Jaaku na Tsuisekisha" (Japanese: ふりきれ！邪悪な追跡者) | Masato Tsujino | Junki Takegami | December 14, 1997 |
| 43 | "We Won't Be Defeated! The Decisive Christmas Eve Clash"; Transliteration: "Makenai! Kessen wa Kurisumasu Ibu" (Japanese: 負けない！決戦はクリスマスイブ) | Takao Nagaishi | Junki Takegami | December 21, 1997 |
| 44 | "Carefree! Kenta's New Year's Eve Crisis"; Transliteration: "O-kiraku! Kenta no Toshikoshi Sōdō" (Japanese: お気楽！健太の年越し騒動) | Masato Tsujino | Yasuko Kobayashi | December 28, 1997 |
| 45 | "Tenacious! Hinelar's Counterattack"; Transliteration: "Shibutoi! Hinerā no Dai Gyakushū" (Japanese: しぶとい！ヒネラーの大逆襲) | Takao Nagaishi | Shigeru Yanagawa | January 4, 1998 |
| 46 | "Prevent it! Setting Sail to Hell"; Transliteration: "Habamu zo! Jigoku e no Funade" (Japanese: 阻むぞ！地獄への船出) | Masato Tsujino | Junki Takegami | January 11, 1998 |
| 47 | "Jump In! Terrifying Hinelar City"; Transliteration: "Tobikome! Kyōfu no Hinerā Shiti" (Japanese: とびこめ！恐怖のヒネラーシティ) | Masato Tsujino | Yasuko Kobayashi | January 18, 1998 |
| 48 | "Crush it! Hinelar's Dark Ambition"; Transliteration: "Tsubusu ze! Hinerā no Kuroi Yabō" (Japanese: つぶすぜ！ヒネラーの黒い野望) | Taro Sakamoto | Junki Takegami | January 25, 1998 |
| 49 | "Utter Despair! We Are Outcasts!?"; Transliteration: "Zetsubō! Oretachi wa Kiraware Mono!?" (Japanese: 絶望！俺たちは嫌われ者！？) | Taro Sakamoto | Yasuko Kobayashi | February 1, 1998 |
| 50 | "Sublime! The Red-Hot Super Soldier Yugande"; Transliteration: "Sōzetsu! Shakunetsu no Chō Senshi Yugande" (Japanese: 壮絶！灼熱の超戦士ユガンデ) | Takao Nagaishi | Junki Takegami | February 8, 1998 |
| 51 | "Seize it! Our Diplomas"; Transliteration: "Tsukamu ze! Oretachi no Sotsugyōshōsho" (Japanese: つかむぜ！俺たちの卒業証書) | Takao Nagaishi | Naruhisa Arakawa | February 15, 1998 |

=== Denji Sentai Megaranger vs. Carranger ===
The V-Cinema special takes place between episodes 39 and 40. Arriving late for school, as the car was at Pegasus Garage, Kenta learns that today is graduation picture day. Seeing a beam of light nearby, Kouichirou gets the others out of class to investigate. The five find a seashell before they are attacked by Space Biker Helmedor who wants the shell to fulfill his dreams, overpowering the Megarangers before Mega Silver arrives and engages the biker in a motorcyclists' duel. Suddenly enlarging with his bike, Helmedor battles Super Galaxy Mega before he is forced to shrink and retreat. Later, while trying to find out the seashell's true nature, Miku uses it to wish for a big cake before it is stolen by a group of strange students who actually are the staff of the Pegasus Garage. But with Mega Yellow placing a tracer on the getaway car, the Megarangers track them to the Pegasus Garage where Kyousuke wishes for Katsudon before he and his team are attacked by Yugande and Crab Nezilar. Refusing to stand aside, they assume their Carranger forms to fight Crab Nezilar while the Megarangers deal with Yugande and the Kunekune. The two Sentai teams join forces to force the Nezirejians back as the shell opens up to reveal an alien identified as Space Fairy Picot who wants to grant their last three wishes. Arriving at Yume Beach, the teams get to know each other while talking out to want they would use the last three wishes before Dappu arrives. But "Dappu" turns out to be Helmedor, having made a deal with the Nezirejians to get Picot.

As Helmedor runs off, Shibonlena has the Kunekune hold the Megarangers as she uses her power to turn the Carrangers into her slaves and sicks them on the Megarangers. During the fight, the Megarangers find the real Dappu and untie him. In a risky gambit, Dappu fuses the Megrangers' weapons with his Carmagic to free the Carrangers from Shibolena's spell. At that time, after wishing for a planet-destroying laser cannon, Helmedor betrays Crab Nezilar and fights him. After making a wish to revive previous Psycho Nezilars to overpower the Megarangers, Crab Nezilars was about to make the final wish when Helmedor steals the fairy. But the Carrangers get Picot and throw a decoy into the distance to hold the villains at bay. Coming to the students' aid, the Carrangers give them Picot to make the final wish to their shock. By the time Crab Nezilar and a brainwashed Helmedor return to the battlefield, the Megarangers' wish to keep fighting enables them to don the Mega Tector armor. After destroying the revived monsters with Rainbow Impulse, Shibolena has Bebedebi bite Crab Nezilar and Helmedor as Mega Voyager and RV Robo are formed to fight them. Though Helmedor attempts to turn with the planting destroying laser, Mega Winger destroys the weapon as Wing Mega Voyager and RV Robo perform their finishers to respectively destroy Crab Nezilar and Helmedor. Soon after, Picot leaves for the next planet as the two sentai teams go out to take their own graduation memorial picture at Yume Beach.

== Cast ==
- Kenta Date: Hayato Ōshiba (大柴 隼人, Ōshiba Hayato)
- Koichiro Endou: Atsushi Ehara (江原 淳史, Ehara Atsushi)
- Shun Namiki: Masaya Matsukaze (松風 雅也, Matsukaze Masaya)
- Chisato Jogasaki: Eri Tanaka (たなか えり, Tanaka Eri)
- Miku Inanuma: Mami Higashiyama (東山 麻美, Higashiyama Mami)
- Yuusaku Hayakawa: Shigeru Kanai (金井 茂, Kanai Shigeru)
- Eikichi Kubota: Satoru Saito (斉藤 暁, Saitō Satoru)
- Jirou Iwamoto: Takumi Hashimoto (橋本 巧, Hashimoto Takumi)
- Gen Ooiwa: Yoshihiro Nozoe (野添 義弘, Nozoe Yoshihiro)
- Shizuka Samejima/Shibolena, Hizumina: Asami Jō (城 麻美, Jō Asami)
- Professor Samejima/Dr. Hinelar: Tetsuo Morishita (森下 哲夫, Morishita Tetsuo)

=== Voice cast ===
- Evil Electro-King Javious I: Ryūzaburō Ōtomo (大友 龍三郎, Ōtomo Ryūzaburō)
- Bibidevi: Tomokazu Seki (関 智一, Seki Tomokazu)
- Yugande: Hirotaka Suzuoki (鈴置 洋孝, Suzuoki Hirotaka)
- Guirail: Tatsuyuki Jinnai (仁内 建之, Jinnai Tatsuyuki)
- Nezi Red/Nezi Phantom: Toshio Funatsu (舟津俊雄, Funatsu Toshio)
- Nezi Black/Nezi Vulgar: Kunihiko Yasui (安井 邦彦, Yasui Kunihiko)
- Nezi Blue/Nezi Bizarre: Yoshiharu Yamada (山田 義晴, Yamada Yoshiharu)
- Nezi Yellow/Nezi Sophia: Masako Katsuki (勝生 真沙子, Katsuki Masako)
- Nezi Pink/Nezi Jealous: Erina Yamazaki (山崎 依里奈, Yamazaki Erina)
- Degitaizer, Pop (2, 5–6, 16, 38, 43, 45–47, 50–51): Samuel Pop Aning (サムエル・ポップ・エニング, Samueru Poppu Eningu)

== fortress lyrics outcast song ==
Opening theme

- "Denji Sentai Megaranger" (電磁戦隊メガレンジャー, Denji Sentai Megarenjā)
  - Lyrics: Saburo Yatsude
  - Composition & Arrangement: Keiichi Oku
  - Artist: Naoto Fūga

Ending themes

- "Ki no Sei ka na" (気のせいかな; "Is It Just My Imagination?")
  - Lyrics: Saburo Yatsude
  - Composition & Arrangement: "Taka-Tora" (鷹虎)
  - Artist: Naoto Fūga
  - Episodes: 1–20, 31–50
- "Bomb Dancing Megaranger" (Bomb Dancing メガレンジャー, Bomb Dancing Megarenjā)
  - Lyrics: Shoko Fujibayashi
  - Composition & Arrangement: Toshihiko Sahashi
  - Artist: Hiroko Asakawa
  - Episodes: 21–30
