= Fiona Hogan =

American actress

Fiona Hogan is an American actress. She was born and raised in New York City. She grew up playing the piano and writing songs as a child. While in college, she got involved in theater, winning numerous acting awards and being awarded a Regent Citation for Contribution to The Arts. During her studies she wrote the score for three musicals and had work commissioned by Paul Anka. After graduation, she went to Los Angeles and studied with renowned acting coach Ivana Chubbuck, who mentored Fiona, and trained her to become an acting teacher.

While under Chubbuck's guidance, she joined The Actors Playground, where she acted and directed in over thirty-five original theater works. In the late '90s, Hogan and Chubbuck went up to Vancouver to oversee "The Ivana Chubbuck Acting Studio." There, Hogan ran the business, taught classes and coached actors on film and TV sets for over five years. While teaching, Hogan also guest-starred on numerous television series and appeared in many studio films including, Connie and Carla, A Guy Thing, See Spot Run, Freddy Got Fingered, and had a supporting lead in I, Robot alongside Will Smith.

Hogan is also credited with hundreds of voice-over spots on radio and TV shows, the lead in the animated series Alienators: Evolution Continues, and minor roles in seven other animated films. She co-created Mental the Musical in Los Angeles.

She currently lives in British Columbia.
