= Gen Sekiguchi =

Japanese film director (born 1968)

Gen Sekiguchi (関口現, born February 10, 1968, in Saitama Prefecture) is a Japanese television advertisement director.

Outside of TV commercials, he directed the short films Bus Panic!!! (2001) and Worst Contact (2000) and the feature film Survive Style 5+ (2004), starring Tadanobu Asano, Reika Hashimoto, Jai West and Vinnie Jones. He also directed and wrote the segment 'Sebiro Yashiki' ("The House of Abandoned Businessmen") in the compilation film Quirky Guys and Gals, and music videos for the bands Supercar, Polysics, and Smap.
