= B-Fighter Kabuto =

- Also known as: Beetle Fighter Kabuto; BF Kabuto
- Genre: Tokusatsu; Superhero fiction Science fiction Military fiction
- Created by: Saburō Yatsude
- Developed by: Junichi Miyashita
- Directed by: Shohei Tojo
- Starring: Hideomi Nakasato; Naoto Adachi; Yukina Kurisu; Reuben Langdon; Seiji Takaiwa; Hideki Anzai; Reika Hashimoto
- Composer: Katsunori Ishida
- Country of origin: Japan
- No. of episodes: 50

Production
- Running time: 25 minutes
- Production companies: Toei Company; Asatsu-DK

Original release
- Network: TV Asahi (ANN)
- Release: March 3, 1996 – February 16, 1997

Related
- Juukou B-Fighter; B-Robo Kabutack

B-Fighter Kabuto (BF(ビーファイター)カブト, Bī Faitā Kabuto) is a Japanese television series in the Metal Hero Series franchise. It is the sequel to Juukou B-Fighter, taking place five years after the preceding B-Fighter series. Kabuto aired from 1996 to 1997. The action footage, suits, and props were used for the Beetleborgs Metallix series.

== Plot ==
Five years after the destruction of Jamahl, Earth has returned to peace again. The Earth Academia has become the Cosmo Academia (コスモアカデミア, Kosumo Akademia), a scientific research and military organization, where Takuya Kai works with Sage Guru on a new generation of Insect Armor in the event of another threat to the Earth.

This threat is realized when a Cosmo Academia exploration submarine comes across a fissure in the ocean floor, out of which rises a huge flying fortress of the ancient tribe Melzard. This clan has been resting for millennia and seeks to destroy mankind. Matriarch Mother Melzard sends her oldest sons Raija and Dezzle to lead the attack with Raija's Elebamamoth. By then, Guru has infused the Neo Insect Armor with Insect Power, creating the three Command Voicers to link three humans with the armor. Kengo Tachibana and Ran Ayukawa, who have been selected to wear the new armor, ready themselves and become B-Fighter Kuwagar and B-Fighter Tentou. But the person to become B-Fighter Kabuto had not been chosen when the remaining Command Voicer flies out the window. Ran and Kengo follow it to meet Kouhei Toba, a star athlete at his school who is losing badly to Elebammoth who froze the boy's sister as the last Command Voicer flies into his hand. Kengo and Ran are shocked that this high school student is to be B-Fighter Kabuto, but they go to him and teach him how to transform. He changes into Kabuto and the three of them attack Elebammoth and several henchmen, with Kabuto killing Elebammoth.

Refusing to accept defeat, Mother Melzard continues her attacks, with Raija and Dezzle working against each other in their attacks on the B-Fighters.

== Characters ==
=== New Generation of B-Fighters ===
- Kouhei Toba/B-Fighter Kabuto (鳥羽 甲平／BF(ビーファイター)カブト, Toba Kōhei/Bī Faitā Kabuto) is a 17-year-old (later 18 year-old) high-school student at Hijiri Sei High School in the second grade (3rd grade later) who is dragged into the fight. A star athlete, Kouhei is a very courageous fighter, although he is sometimes impetuous. He lives with his younger sister Yui, whom he cares for and overprotects. As Kabuto (and like Blue Beet before him), Kouhei dons armor modeled after a Japanese rhinoceros beetle. Kabuto is the only B-Fighter who can wield the Astral Saber to become one with and gain control of the giant robot, Kabuterios. He is in love with Sophie. After the final battle, He leaves for the United States with Sophie for college studies and training in 2 New York City head offices of Cosmo Academia.
- Kengo Tachibana/B-Fighter Kuwagar (橘 健吾／BF(ビーファイター)クワガー, Tachibana Kengo/Bī Faitā Kuwagā) is a serious, 22-year-old environment investigator. He originally had no respect for Kouhei, because Kouhei was chosen to become Kabuto instead of himself and Kouhei was younger, although they eventually became friends. As Kuwagar (and like G-Stag before him), Kengo donned armor modeled after a stag beetle. At the end of the series, Kuwagar was able to wield the Geist Axe and take control of the giant robot, Kuwaga Titan, which was formerly being used by Descorpion and Mother Melzard for evil but was not actually evil. In episode 11 it is revealed that his father is a diplomat.
- Ran Ayukawa/B-Fighter Tentou (鮎川 蘭／BF(ビーファイター)テントウ, Ayukawa Ran/Bī Faitā Tentō) is an 18-year-old cyber engineer, who sometimes thought too much about mechanics and ignored the natural side. She had feelings for Julio when he taught her to appreciate nature. Ran loved to eat and was skilled at playing the shamisen, a stringed Japanese instrument. She left her parents' home at 15. As Tentou (unlike Reddle before her), Ran's armor was modeled after a ladybug. After the death of her father, her mother moves to the United States to study hotel management.

==== New B-Fighters ====
The New B-Fighters (新BF(ビーファイター), Shin Bī Faitā) were four individuals from the New York City, Machupicchu, Beijing, and Paris branches of Cosmo Academia who used the Insect Commanders (インセクトコマンダー, Insekuto Komandā), a variant of the Command Voicer that stored their Neo Insect Armor which activated when they inserted their respective data card and shouted "Chou Juukou!" (Chojuko!, Super Heavy Shell!). They consumed most of their power to destroy a crystal Mother Melzard had that ignited detonators inside various humans. Afterwards, their Insect Commanders merged with the Geist Axe in the finale.

- Mack Windy/B-Fighter Yanma (マック・ウィンディ／BF(ビーファイター)ヤンマ, Makku Windi/Bī Faitā Yanma): Mack is an American martial artist/agent from the New York City head office of Cosmo Academia, a master of boxing and aikido chosen by the Dragonfly Insect Medal to become Yanma. He posed as an exchange student in Kouhei's school, becoming the boy's rival as a result. He eventually revealed himself as a B-Fighter when the three were attacked by B-Crushers, making an enemy out of Mukadelinger and losing to him until Kabuto comes to his aid. After giving him his Tonbou Gun, Mack left for America after telling them of the three other Insect Medals. Mack was outgoing, flirting with Japanese girls at every chance and pigging out on sushi. As Yanma, Mack's armor was modeled after a dragonfly. His attacks were the Dragon Flying (ドラゴンフライング, Doragon Furaingu) spin attack, and the Spinning Bomber (スピニングボンバー, Supiningu Bonbā), a tornado spin attack.
- Julio Rivera/B-Fighter Genji (フリオ・リベラ／BF(ビーファイター)ゲンジ, Furio Ribera/Bī Faitā Genji) is a Peruvian archeologist/agent from the South America branch of Cosmo Academia in Machupicchu. He played a reed flute with strange powers that he gave to Ran as a memento of their time together. He was chosen by the Firefly Insect Medal to become Genji, whose armor was modeled after a firefly.
- Li Wen/B-Fighter Min (李文(リー・ウェン)／BF(ビーファイター)ミン, Rī Wen/Bī Faitā Min) is a 35-year-old Chinese teacher/agent from the Beijing branch of Cosmo Academia. Li was an elementary schoolteacher who loved children and often put on magic shows in parks for children, and was also a good cook. He was a peaceful man who hated the fight between the B-Fighters and Melzard, and at first refused to cooperate when he obtained the Cicada Insect Medal. However, Kengo made him realize that the B-Fighters fight in order to stop the fighting, and so he agreed to help as Min, whose armor was modeled after a cicada. His attacks are the Sonic Pressure (ソニックプレッシャー, Sonikku Puresshā) and the Laser Arrow (ルーザーアロー, Rūzā Arō), fires from his antennae.
- Sophie Villeneuve/B-Fighter Ageha (ソフィー・ヴィルヌーブ／BF(ビーファイター)アゲハ, Sofī Virunūbu/Bī Faitā Ageha) is a 17-year-old French musician/agent of Indochinese descent. From the Paris branch of Cosmo Academia, Sophie was a master violinist at 14 years-old a study in a Paris Art University aged 10. At first, she had no idea how to use her Insect Commander. She is in love with Kouhei, and her song was able to awaken the Astral Saber from its sleep. She was chosen by the Butterfly Insect Medal to become Ageha, whose armor was modeled after a butterfly. She used her Kniving Radar to scan for a fast-moving enemy.

==== Arsenal ====
- Command Voicers (コマンドボイサー, Komando Boisā) are the transformation devices used by all seven B-Fighters. They store the Neo Insect Armor which is activated when the users of the Command Voicer insert their respective data card and shout "Chou Juukou!" (超重甲!, Chōjūkō!, Super Heavy Shell!). The Command Voicers disappeared with the Astral Saber and Geist Axe after Jadow Mothera is defeated.
- Input Cardguns (インプットカードガン, Inputto Kādogan): Sidearms for the main three B-Fighters. Activated with the Input Cards. Numbers as follows:
  - IC-01. Attack Beam (アタックビーム, Atakku Bīmu): Standard energy blast
  - IC-02. Fire Beam (ファイヤービーム, Faiyā Bīmu): Blast of fire
  - IC-03. Jamming Beam (ジャミングビーム, Jamingu Bīmu): Blast of disrupting sound waves that stun enemies
  - IC-04. Needle Laser (ニードルレーザー, Nīdoru Rēzā): Blast of small needle-like darts
  - IC-05. Cement Beam (セメントビーム, Semento Bīmu): Blast of cement that hardens when it hits its target
  - IC-06. Cold Beam (コールドビーム, Kōrudo Bīmu): Freezing blast of cold
  - IC-07. Tornado Shower (トルネードシャワー, Torunēdo Shawā): Blast of powerful air at high speeds
- Finish Weapons (フィニッシュウェポン, Finisshu Weapon): For the main three B-Fighters. These can fire Electric Shockwaves (エレクトリックショックウェーブ, Erekutorikku Shokkuwēbu), crossing two or three.
  - Kabuto Lancer (カブトランサー, Kabuto Ransā): Kabuto's Finish Weapon. Its finishing attacks are the Liner Blast (ライナーブラスト, Rainā Burasuto) and Cavalier Lancer (キャバリアランサー, Kyabaria Ransā) on the Road Kabuto.
  - Kuwagar Chopper (クワガーチョッパー, Kuwagā Choppā): Kuwagar's Finish Weapon. Its finishing attack is the Gravity Crush (グラビティクラッシュ, Gurabiti Kurasshu).
  - Tentou Spear (テントウスピアー, Tentō Supiā): Tentou's Finish Weapon. Its finishing attack is the Crossway Slicer (クロスウェイスライサー, Kurosuwei Suraisā).

===== New B-Fighter Weapons =====
- Lightning Cannon (ライトニングキャノン, Raitoningu Kyanon): Genji's weapon. Its attack is Max Flasher (マックスフラッシャー, Makkusu Furasshā).
- Ringer Swords (リンガーソード, Ringā Sōdo): Min's weapons
- Bloom Cannon (ブルームキャノン, Burūmu Kyanon): Ageha's weapon, transforms from her Insect Commander and "Flower Weapon" Input Card. Its attacks are the Beam Shower (ビームシャワー, Bīmu Shawā) and the Maxim Blast (マキシムブラスト, Makishimu Burasuto).
- Beet Arms (ビートアームズ, Bīto Āmuzu): Secondary weapons given to the main B-Fighters by the New B-Fighters
  - Tonbou-Gun (トンボウガン, Tonbōgan): At first B-Fighter Yanma's weapon. Later given to B-Fighter Kabuto, who can attach in front of the Input Cardgun.
  - Bright Pointer (ブライトポインター, Buraito Pointā): At first B-Fighter Genji's weapon. Later given to B-Fighter Tentou, who can attach it to the top of the Input Cardgun and fire the Bright Flash (ブライトフラッシュ, Buraito Furasshu) and the Maintenance Ray (メンテナンスレイ, Mentenansu Rei), used to ruin or restore. Also usable as a tranquilizer. Attaching it to the Input Cardgun, it can fire the Impact Flash (インパクトフラッシュ, Inpakuto Furasshu) and the Flash Barrier (フラッシュバリア, Furasshu Baria).
  - Semission Magazine (セミッションマガジン, Semisshon Magajin): At first B-Fighter Min's weapon. Later given to B-Fighter Kuwagar to attach to the back of the Input Cardgun and give elemental powers of the six Nature Energy Cards (ネイチャーエナジーカード, Neichā Enajī Kādo) including Water Power, Thunder Power, Flame Power, Light Power, Storm Power, and Earth Power. Attaching it to the Input Cardgun with the Bright Pointer, it can fire the Revital Waves (リバイタルウェーブ, Ribaitaru Wēbu) (combined with Brighter Pointer), used to heal Kabuto, Tentou and Min.
- Input Rifle (インプットライフル, Inputto Raifuru): Combination of Input Cardgun and the three Beet Arms. The Input Rifle is much more powerful than any other in the B-Fighters' arsenal. Normally held by Kabuto, who fires the Kabutonic Buster (カブトニックバスター, Kabutonikku Basutā), a ball of destructive energy. Once, however, Kuwagar with Yanma and Min used the Input Rifle and fired a similar ball called the Kuwagatic Buster (クワガティックバスター, Kuwagatikku Basutā).
- Shell God Seal Sword Astral Saber (甲神封印剣アストラルセイバー, Kōjin Fūinken Asutoraru Seibā): The Astral Saber is a red and gold short sword with a red crystal ball in its hilt. Within this ball is a small mechanical kabutomushi beetle that is actually the giant Kabuterios. The Astral Saber was sleeping in a cave until Sophie Villeneuve's song woke it. Upon having the Dragonfly, Firefly, Cicada, Butterfly, Scorpion, Centipede, Mantis and Hornet Insect Medals put into the handle of the Astral Saber, B-Fighter Kabuto was able to call Kabuterios forth from the saber and join with the giant robot, gaining the B-Fighters a powerful ally. After Kabuterios and Kuwaga Titan first defeat each other, the hilt of the Astral Saber turns into stone, returning to normal in episode 41. It disappears after the final battle.
- Geist Axe (ガイストアックス, Gaisuto Akkusu): The Geist Axe is a green axe with a green crystal ball similar to the Astral Saber's in its hilt. Within it is a mechanical stag beetle that becomes the giant Kuwaga Titan. Initially, Descorpion was the wielder of the Geist Axe and the commander of Kuwaga Titan. After Kabuterios and Kuwaga Titan defeat each other, its hilt turned to stone, returning to normal in episode 41 with Mother Melzard as the new wielder. She lost the Axe in the next episode. Later in the finale, with the New B-Fighters' Insect Commanders merging into it, B-Fighter Kuwager got possession of the weapon and used the power of Kuwaga Titan for good. It disappears after the final battle.

==== Road Beetles ====
Each B-Fighter has a Road Beetle (ロードビートル, Rōdo Bītoru) providing his primary transportation. Their names are Road Kabuto (ロードカブト, Rōdo Kabuto), Road Kuwagar (ロードクワガー, Rōdo Kuwagā) and Road Tentou (ロードテントウ, Rōdo Tentō).

- Osanaioh S (オサナイオーS, Osanaiō Esu) is Professor Osanai's prototype of the Road Beetle that can change into Super Mode (スーパーモード, Sūpā Mōdo). Its name stands for "Operating system of Self-Awake Navigation with Accelerate-Interface-set-in 0 (zero)-Unit".

==== Neo Beet Machines ====
The Neo Beet Machines (ネオビートマシン, Neo Bīto Mashin) are the B-Fighters' super machines that they use to fight Melzard airborne and ground vehicles. They emerge from the Cosmo Academia Beetle Base (コスモアカデミア ビートルベース, Kosumo Akademia Bītoru Bēsu), the B-Fighter's base of operations following the command "Neo Beet Machines, launch!". The Beetle Base was blown up along with the Neo Beet Machines thanks to the efforts of Killmantis, Beezack, Dezzle and Dord near the finale.

- Kabutron (カブトロン, Kabutoron) is Kabuto's Neo Beet Machine, a gold and black 6-wheeled vehicle with a rhinoceros beetle horn on the front. From this horn it can fire a powerful energy blast, the Kabuto Shooter (カブトシューター, Kabuto Shūtā). It can open its wings to reveal jets that let it fly for Flight Mode (フライトモード, Furaito Mōdo). It can also tilt downward for Battle Formation (バトルフォーメーション, Batoru Fōmēshon) so that its horn can dig a trench in the ground to dig up underground enemies, and can throw an enemy in the Horn Thruster (ホーンスラスター, Hōrn Surasutā) attack.
- Kuwaga Tank (クワガタンク, Kuwaga Tanku) is Kuwagar's Neo Beet Machine, a black tank with two pincer-like horns on the front. The Kuwaga Tank can grab enemies in these horns and toss them about. On top, it has a double-barreled gun, the Kuwagar Cannon (クワガーキャノン, Kuwagā Kyanon). It can convert to Battle Formation, the front rising up and folding back, and can fire off its horns to hit enemies at long-range in the Shoot Scissors (シュートシザース, Shūto Shizāsu) attack.
- Stealth Gyro (ステルスジャイロ, Suterusu Jairo) is Tentou's Neo Beet Machine, a small plane with two large turbines on its tail and two large wings with hover turbines on them. The Stealth Gyro can fire a blast of energy from its Stealth Blaster (ステルスブラスター, Suterusu Burasutā). In Joint Formation (ジョイントフォーメーション, Jointo Fōmēshon), it can transport the two Neo Beet Machines, attaching Kabutron and Kuwaga Tank to the underside of its wings.

==== Shell Gods ====
The two Shell Gods (甲神, Kōjin) are giant insect robot gods from space. Kabuterious and Kuwaga Titan were allies that fought a great battle and were swept into a vortex that defeated an evil foe. They were eventually encased inside two weapons, the Astral Saber and the Geist Axe, until they would be found in the present.

- Great Shell God Kabuterios (大甲神カブテリオス, Daikōjin Kabuteriosu) is the gold and black Shell God that can change into a giant robot Build Mode (ビルドモード, Birudo Mōdo) from a Big Beetle Mode (ビッグビートルモード, Biggu Bītoru Mōdo). It normally stays inside the Astral Saber but can emerge and enlarge itself when needed. B-Fighter Kabuto can join with Kabuterios and control it. Kabuterios fights with the Shell God Sword (甲神剣, Kōjinken) that can block laser blasts from Fly Gidorbas and can fire a powerful blast of fire, the Big Flare (ビュグフレア, Biggu Furea), or fire eye beams called the Terios Flash (テリオスフラッシュ, Teriosu Furasshu), and an energy beam from its chest, the Glorious Flare (グロリアスフレア, Guroriasu Furea).
- Evil Shell God Kuwaga Titan (邪甲神クワガタイタン, Jakōjin Kuwaga Taitan) is the green and black Shell God that can change into a giant robot Build Mode from a Big Stag Beetle Mode (ビッグスタッグビートルモード, Biggu Sutaggu Bītoru Mōdo). It stays inside the Geist Axe until called forth, and was originally controlled by Descorpion, later by Mother Melzard, and was used for evil. However, Kuwaga Titan was (despite his title) not actually evil and once fought alongside Kabuterios. At the end of the series, the Geist Axe was claimed by the B-Fighters and allowed B-Fighter Kuwagar to use it to fight for good. Kuwaga Titan can fire a blast of energy, the Titanic Flare (タイタニックフレア, Taitanikku Furea) using the Evil Shell Sword (邪甲剣, Jakōken) (it can be used to block Kabuterios' Big Flare), shoot lightning from its left fist called the Titanic Thunder (タイタニックサンダー, Taitanikku Sandā); or a blast of lightning from either its eyes or antennae.

=== Allies ===
- Professor Masaru Osanai (小山内 勝, Osanai Masaru) is the Japan branch chief of Cosmo Academia.
- Artificial Life Bit (人工生命体ビット, Jinkō Seimeitai Bitto) is the artificial lifeform in the computer of the Beetle Base that sends out alerts and analyzes data on enemies.
- Yui Toba (鳥羽 ゆい, Toba Yui) is Kouhei's younger sister and his self-proclaimed manager, covering for him when he leaves school to fight Melzard. She is in love with Kengo. She was once put under a spell, when Mother Melzard gave her a pink/white flower armor-themed warrior.
- Sage Guru (老師グル, Rōshi Guru) gave the original B-Fighters their powers. Though aged, he is still able to help the B-Fighters using his extensive knowledge of the Melzard. Guru died trying to protect the insects of the world from the "Dark Wave Motion" power of Dargriffon. He was buried in the cave where Takuya first found him as the B-Fighters' technology eventually fades, from the First Generation to the New Generation once they had defeated the Melzard.
- Extradimensional Supplier Kabuto (異次元調達屋カブト, Ijigen Chōtatsuya Kabuto) is Guru's son who left his father one hundred years before and traveled across the dimensions as a supplier of weapons and equipment. He returned to Earth to visit his mother's grave, bringing with him the Beet Ingram to give to Takuya Kai/Blue Beet years ago. When his father Guru died, he returned again to visit his father's grave.

==== First Generation of B-Fighters ====
The B-Fighters of the first generation sometimes appear and help out the new generation. After destroying the Jamahl, they were transferred to the Cosmo Academia branch. They occasionally aid the New Generation B-Fighters before Guru dies, destroying their ability to become B-Fighters.

- Takuya Kai/Blue Beet (甲斐 拓也／ブルービート, Kai Takuya/Burū Bīto) is the team leader who developed the Neo Insect Armors as the chief of the development project of the new B-Fighters. Now 28, he works at the New York office.
- Daisaku Katagiri/G-Stag (片霧 大作／ジースタッグ, Katagiri Daisaku/Jī Sutaggu) is also 28 and works at the Europe branch.
- Mai Takatori/Reddle (鷹取 舞／レッドル, Takatori Mai/Reddoru) is 24.

===== Arsenal =====
- Ultra High-Frequency Machine (超高周波発生装置, Chōkōshūha Hassei Sōchi) is a cannon type weapon that was developed at the New York head office.
- Sonic Flap - Wave of Light (ソニックフラップ・光の波動, Sonikku Furappu Hikari no Hadō) is a combination attack that upgraded the Sonic Flap.

=== Melzard Tribe ===
The Melzard Tribe (メルザード一族, Meruzādo Ichizoku) are an ancient race that have existed since prehistoric times. They dwell in the fortress Melzardos (メルザードス, Meruzādosu), which Mother Melzard is an extension of.

- Melzard Tribe Founding Empress Mother Melzard (メルザード一族·皇祖女帝マザーメルザード, Meruzādo Ichizoku Kōso Jotei Mazā Meruzādo) is a monster with a snake-like tail instead of legs who leads Melzard. She gave birth to the members by eating a fossil of any animal or plant with one of her tendrils and spitting it back out as an egg which instantly hatches into a Melzard. After the battle in which Kabuterios and Kuwaga Titan defeat each other, Mother Melzard fell asleep, gaining an eye on her left breast upon waking up and taking control of Kuwaga Titan. After a battle on the moon with Kabuterios, the Geist Axe was lost. Mother Melzard then proceeded to use a rain to implant bombs in all humans in a scheme to wipe out the entire population. When the B-Fighters entered her fortress, she fought them personally before activating the bombs, leaving only Kabuto unaffected. Severing her connection to the Melzardos, the New B-Fighters destroyed the detonator as the Melzardos crashes. But using the energy of the Earth, Mother Melzard evolved into a larger reptilian monster called Jadow Mothera (ジャドーマザーラ, Jadō Mazāra). She then went on a city-smashing spree while overpowering Kuwaga Titan until he chopped her tail off. When Kabuterios was summoned, the two Shell Gods destroy Jadow Mothera.
- First Son Dinosaur Warrior Raija (長男·恐竜武人ライジャ, Kyōryū Bujin Raija) is the eldest son of Melzard. A powerful warrior with red Ceratopsia-like armor, he commanded the Melzard monsters based on land-dwelling creatures. Raija frequently quarreled with Dezzle, each trying to outdo the other. Sent to obtain the Insect Medals, Raija battled Kabuto one-on-one after his clone creation was destroyed. Though seemingly killed by Kabuto, Raija managed to take the Scorpion Insect Medal as his body petrified. Raija was later revived by Mother Melzard in a new maroon armored form, empowered by the magma deep within the earth. He make new friends with Descorpion, who also helped to defeat Kabuto. Surviving the Melzardos, Rajia overpowered Kuwagar before battling Kabuto and before being mortally wounded.
- Second Son Deep Sea Fish-man Dezzle (次男·深海魚人デズル, Shinkai Gyojin Dezuru) is the second son of Melzard. Dezzle was Raija's constant rival and wore an elaborate blue costume with fins and an anglerfish-like helmet. He commanded the Melzard monsters based on water-dwelling creatures and often actively sabotaged Raija's plans. After Raija was killed, Dezzle was granted greater power from Mother Melzard and became Dezzle the Great (デズル・ザ・グレート, Dezuru Za Gurēto) where he wields a trident. He was defeated by the Input Rifle with only his head remaining. Dord placed Dezzle's head on a tank. Dezzle was later revived by Mother Melzard in a new, mysterious form. His new form, giving him new power from the darkness of the deep sea, had a small torso, a black cape, and a white mask which hid his face. Dezzle later found the B-Fighters' base of operations, assuming Professor Osanai's form to activate the BF Base's self-destruct along with a virus to spread to the other branches. He overpowered Kuwagar and Tentou as Kabuto arrived. They took the fight outside while Professor Osanai deleted the virus. He almost killed Kabuto until he was hit by the Input Rifle. He accidentally fell into the Kabuto Lancer still latched unto Dord before he is killed by the Input Rifle.
- Raija's Chief Bodyguard General Insect Swordswoman Miolra (ライジャ親衛隊長昆虫剣士ミオーラ, Raija Shin'ei Taichō Konchū Kenshi Miōra) is Raija's comrade, a female warrior in light green insectoid armor who wields two red swords. When Raija was seemingly killed, she stayed by his petrified body until he awakened. Miolra survived the Melzardos only to die fighting Tentou.
- Dezzle's Chief Bodyguard Rock Shell Chamberlain Dord (デズル親衛隊長石貝侍従ドード, Dezeru Shin'ei Taichō Ishigai Jijū Dōdo) is the captain of Dezzle's Bodyguards, a squat creature whose head resembles an ammonite fossil. Dord looked after Dezzle's head after he was blown to pieces and remained as his loyal servant until Dezzle returned in his new form. Dord was killed alongside Dezzle by B-Fighter Kabuto with the Input Rifle after his shell was impaled by Kabuto's lance.
- Darkness Generals B-Crushers (闇の四鎧将ビークラッシャー, Yami no Shigaishō Bī Kurasshā) are the Melzard's primary fighters against the B-Fighters. Raija and Dezzle gathered 4 of the 8 Insect Medals (first obtaining the Centipede Insect Medal, than the Bee, Mantis and the Scorpion Insect Medal afterwards) for Mother Melzard using energy gathered by Dezzle. She had four of her larval offspring merge into suits of armor powered by the medals. In their debut, the B-Crushers lured the B-Fighters into the open and sprang a trap. The B-Crushers overpower them until Mack comes to aid as B-Fighter Yanma. Descorpion ordered a fall back as they proved their superiority. But in the second match, Kabuto defeated them. After B-Fighter Kabuto activated Kabuterios, the B-Crushers were injured and had to be cocooned until their wounds had healed. Afterwards, they gained possession of the Geist Axe. They also came to be at odds with Raija, Dezzle and their crew.
  - B-Crusher Descorpion (ビークラッシャーデスコーピオン, Bī Kurasshā Desukōpion) is the scorpion-armored leader of the B-Crushers. Also known as the Deadly Poison Armored General (猛毒鎧将, Mōdoku Gaishō), he is an honorable warrior by nature, preferring to fight fair compared to his teammates' methods. He uses the Poison Anchor (ポイズンアンカー, Poizun Ankā) on his right to grab and strangle enemies and a Slaughter Scissors (スローターシザース, Surōtā Shizāsu) claw-attachment for his left forearm slashing attacks. His rival is Raija, who also wants to defeat Kabuto. Once tried to kill Kabuto using a bomb attached to his belt buckle. He wielded the Geist Axe until Mother Melzard took it from him. When the B-Fighters enter the Melzardis, Descorpion fights them as Rajia and Miolra join in. Surviving the Melzardos' crash, Descorpion battles Kabuto. Accepting defeat, he was killed by Kabuto's Liner Blast.
  - B-Crusher Mukadelinger (ビークラッシャームカデリンガー, Bī Kurasshā Mukaderingā) is the centipede-armored polar opposite of Descorpion. Also known as the Cold-Blooded Armored General (冷血鎧将, Reiketsu Gaishō), his weapon is the Hundred Feeler (ハンドレッドフィーラー, Handoretto Fīrā) trident and he can open his chest to reveal the Mukadenic Bomb (ムカデニックボム, Mukadenikku Bomu). He uses the centipede legs on his armor to control ordinary humans via mind control, such as when he attempted revenge on Yanma. Leaving Melzard, he challenged the B-Fighters despite learning that he had a bomb inside him and then took Yui hostage. The New B-Fighters arrived and used their signature moves to weaken Mukadelinger before Kabuto defeated him with the Input Rifle. Mother Melzard activated the bombs and destroyed Mukadelinger.
  - B-Crusher Killmantis (ビークラッシャーキルマンティス, Bī Kurasshā Kirumantisu) is a mantis-armored expert at using bladed weapons. Also known as the Demon Blade Armored General (魔剣鎧将, Maken Gaishō), his two Felinger Snipe (フェリンガースナイプ, Feringā Sunaipu) sickles allow him to cut through millions of peaches in blinding speed with lightning-fast strikes and used in his Killer Hands (キラーハンズ, Kirā Hanzu) attack. Sent with Beezack to the Neo B-Machine hangar to destroy the mecha, Killmantis learned they'd been sent on a suicide mission where Kabuto wounded them. Near death, Killmantis sacrificed himself to complete his mission.
  - B-Crusher Beezack (ビークラッシャービーザック, Bī Kurasshā Bīzakku) is a hornet-armored master of disguise and illusion assuming human guides to lower his enemies' guard. Also known as the Mirage Armored General (変幻鎧将, Hengen Gaishō), he can hide himself and attack from shelter with his Hardoc Shocker (ハードックショッカー, Hādokku Shokkā) weapon. Sent with Killmantis to the Neo B-Machine hangar to destroy the mecha. Like Killmantis, Beezack did not know they'd been sent on a suicide mission and sacrificed himself.
- The Bodyguards (ボディーガード, Bodīgādo) are Melzard's foot soldiers who belong to either Raija and Dezzle. Raija's Bodyguards (ライジャのボディーガード, Raija no Bodīgādo) seem to be made from the fossils of land creatures: 2 Stegoceras, 2 Pteranodons, and 2 prehistoric spiders. Dezzle's Bodyguards (デズル親衛隊, Dezuru no Bodīgādo) seem to be made from the fossils of sea creatures: 2 prehistoric fish, 2 prehistoric jellyfish, and 2 prehistoric squids. They are disintegrated by Mother Melzard in episode 42.
- Gidorbas (ギドーバ, Gidōba): Giant worm-like tanks can transform into the Fly Gidorbas (フライギドーバ, Furai Gidōba) aerial fighters, and vice versa.

==== Melzard Monsters ====
The Melzard Monsters are monsters of the land and sea given birth by Mother Melzard after consuming fossils associated with prehistoric life.

===== Raija's Monsters =====
Raija's monsters are land-based creatures:

- Giant Elephant Beast Elebammoth (巨象獣エレバンモス, Kyozōjū Erebanmosu) is a deformed monster who was born from a woolly mammoth fossil. He was sent to begin a new Ice Age and kill all of humanity. Elebammoth froze everything in his path with his liquid nitrogen gas. When he froze Yui, Kouhei battled it and lost until the last Command Voicer flies into his hand as Kengo and Ran arrived. As Kabuto, Kouhei killed Elebammoth with the Cavalier Lancer attack.
- Violent Dragon Beast Dinozaura (凶竜獣ディノザーラ, Kyōryūjū Dinozāra) was born from a Tyrannosaurus fossil. Dinozaura had three heads, two Tyrannosaurus-like arms, and two tails for extra arms. He was sent to destroy the power lines and sources in the city to prevent Cosmo Academia from setting up the Neo Beet Machines. Dinozaura was soon defeated by the B-Fighters. He returned with powerful bombs in his heads for a kamikaze attack to take out the Neo Beet Machines. When the B-Fighters realized Dinozaura was not attacking powerlines as before, they got him to follow them to the countryside to finally kill him after his heads detached from his exploding body.
- Mole Beast Mogerado (土竜獣モゲラード, Mogurajū Mogerādo) was born from a Tyrrhenian mole fossil. He was weak at first until he ate a special fruit that empowered him. Mogerado was killed when Tentou blasted his sunglasses off, leaving him blinded by sunlight and vulnerable for the deathblow by Tentou's Crossway Slicer.
- Flame Ant Beast Baeria (炎蟻獣バエリア, Engijū Baeria) is an ant monster with ant-like heads for hands who was born from a Titanomyrma fossil. She was sent to lay her eggs around Mount Fuji and as the eggs neared hatching, they began to rise in temperature, threatening to cause an eruption. Dezzle, intend on sabotaging his brother's plan, gave medicine to Baeria that would raise her body temperature. However, the temperature in Baeria kept rising making her a living bomb. Kabuto managed to freeze Baeria to reduce her temperature so he could finish her off without an explosion.
- Leaping Fist Beast Gangaroo (跳拳獣ガンガルー, Chōkenjū Gangarū) was born from a giant kangaroo fossil. He stole the talents of various athletes by swallowing them in his pouch. He also swallowed Kengo. Gangaroo was killed by Kabuto after a lengthy battle.
- Thorn Illusion Beast Zabodera (棘幻獣ザボデーラ, Kyokugenjū Zabodēra) was born from half of a cactus fossil. He was finished off by Tentou. Zabodera's spirit was later summoned by Zanshoror.
- Bat Beast Zyren (蝙蝠獣ザイレーン, Kōmorijū Zairēn) was born from a prehistoric giant vampire bat fossil. He was killed by Kabuto's Liner Blast. Zyren's spirit was later summoned by Zanshoror.
- Fang Tiger Beast Dorafire (牙虎獣ドラファイヤー, Kikojū Dorafaiyā) was born from a Smilodon fossil. Dorafire looked like a near-skeletal mouse with a second tiger-striped smilodon's head on his forehead and Smilodon-like hands. Dorafire could blast flamethrowers from his tiger head. After being briefly frozen, he was killed by Kabuto's Cold Laser/Liner Blast combo.
- Destroyed Flower Beast Groba (滅花獣グロバ, Mekkajū Guroba) was born from a fern fossil. Groba could sprinkle a destructive pollen from her head in battle. Killed by the combined weapons of all 3 B-Fighters.
- Heat Fruit Beast Pineappler (熱果獣パイナプラー, Nekkajū Painapurā) was born from a pineapple fossil. Pineappler was killed by one punch from Kabuto.
- Heat Wind Beast Zarst (灼風獣ザースト, Shakufūjū Zāsuto) was born from a Teratornis fossil. With flaps of his wings or a blast from his breath, Zarst could cause immense heat waves. This lasted until the B-Fighters killed him.
- Changing Color Beast Gameleorda (変色獣ガメレオーダ, Henshokujū Gamereōda) was born from a prehistoric chameleon fossil. Killed by B-Fighter Tentou.
- Frightful Warrior Beast Driceraija (恐武獣ドリケライジャ, Kyōbujū Dorikeraija) was a Triceratops-themed monster born from a part of Raija's body. Driceraija could breathe fire and use a sword. He accompanied his parent in taking the Insect Medals from the powerless B-Fighters, setting the forest on fire to flush Kouhei and Takuya as they and the other B-Fighters were gathered in one place to be executed. Once the team regain their transformation abilities, Driceraija was killed by the B-Fighter's teamwork.

===== Dezzle's Monsters =====
Dezzle's monsters are water-based creatures.

- Trilo-Beast Zazanyoda (三葉獣ザザンヨーダ, Sanyōjū Zazanyōda) was born from a trilobite fossil and was sent to abduct the girls at Kouhei's school. His mission was to absorb the lifeforce from people through his tentacles and use it to enlarge himself to giant size. Zazanyoda was almost invincible until the B-Fighters fired at his weak point, the small trilobyte on his forehead. Reduced to his normal size, he was killed by the B-Fighters.
- Shell Turtle Beast Gamegeron (甲亀獣ガメゲロン, Kōkijū Gamegeron) was born from an Archelon fossil. The powder scraped from his shell was sold as a calcium supplement called "Bone-Health", but that hardened skin into bone. B-Fighters attacked Gamegeron, but his shell was too hard to be cracked. Gamegeron's only weaknesswas his belly, which he covered. Kabuto's determination finally shattered the monster's shell.
- Covering Star Beast Hitodenajiru (覆星獣ヒトデナジル, Fukuseijū Hitodenajiru) was born from a Calliderma fossil. He could possess people and enhance their aggressive behavior. Targeting Kazuya Yano, the son of Kengo's late sensei Ryuzaburo Yano, he used the man's hatred for Kengo to wreak havoc across town. He uses smaller starfish parasites from his body to possess people, turning them into violent slaves under his control. The B-Fighters were forced to retreat as a result. The B-Fighters dispatched Kengo to fight Kazuya, while Kabuto and Tentou handled the angry mob. The two fortunately learned that electricity was the starfish-parasite's weakness. They freed the people with the Electric Shockwave just as Kengo freed Kazuya from Hitodenajiru's control, forcing the monster out of him. Once gathered, the B-Fighters learned that Electric ShockWave was useless on Hitodenajiru. But Kazuya's Triple Lightning Kick severely weakened Hitodenajiru enabling B-Fighter Kuwagar to finish him off.
- Greedy Fish Beast Coelaganza (貪魚獣シーラガンザ, Dongyojū Shīraganza) was born from a coelacanth fossil. B-Fighter Kuwagar singlehandedly killed him after Coelaganaza murdered Kuwagar's sister.
- Hell Sickle Beast Hellgama (獄鎌獣ヘルガーマ, Gokurenjū Herugāma) was born from a Beelzebufo fossil. Hellgama was killed by Kabuto.
- Changing Body Beast Isogilala (化身獣イソギララ, Keshinjū Isogirara) was born from a prehistoric sea anemone fossil and killed by Tentou's Crossway Slicer. Isogilala's spirit was later summoned by Zanshoror.
- Sea Scorpion Beast Kaizazora (海蠍獣カイザゾラー, Umisasorijū Kaizazorā) was born from a sea scorpion fossil. In battle, Kaizazora could detach/blast its arms and its combined head and stinger tail at opponents. After B-Fighter's Kabuto and Tentou hit his weak spot, he was killed by Kuwagar's Gravity Crush.
- Water Dwelling Beast Kapparapa (水棲獣カッパラパ, Suiseijū Kapparapa) is a Kappa-themed monster with no backstory. He was killed by Kuwagar.
- Poison Fin Beast Okozezeze (毒鰭獣オコゼゼゼ, Dokuhirejū Okozezeze) was born from a prehistoric lionfish fossil. Okozezeze could blast stinger darts from its mouth in battle. Okozezeze was killed by Kabuto's Liner Blast.
- Spirit Evil Beast Zanshoror (霊魔獣ザンショーオー, Reimajū Zanshōō) was born from a Amphibamus fossil and looks like it was composed of many salamanders. Zanshoror brought the spirits of Zabodera, Zyren, and Isogilala to life. Kuwagar killed him.

===== Combo Monsters =====
Some of these creatures were both Raija and Dezzle's monsters with some of them being born from two or more fossils:

- Tooth Clam Beast Nezugaira (歯貝獣ネズガイラ, Hakaijū Nezugaira) was a hybrid monster born from a Flores cave rat fossil and a prehistoric clam fossil, combining both their strengths. Nezugaira suffered a split personality: he was both a gentle creature and a sadistic monster. He was eventually killed by Tentou's Crossway Slicer.
- Snake Mysterious Beast Hebyusa (蛇妖獣ヘビューザ, Jayōjū Hebyūza) is a monster that resembles a Gorgon from Greek Mythology with snake-headed tendrils and has no backstory. She was sent to retrieve the case containing four Insect Medals. Though killed by Super Blue Beet, Hebyusa's snake-headed tendrils infected the B-Fighters with her venom (first Kuwagar, then Tentou, G-Stag, Blue Beet, Reddle, and Kabuto) turning the two teams against each other until the viral venom is removed from the commanders.
- Darkness Combined Beast Arajibiray (暗黒合成獣アラジビレイ, Ankoku Gōseijū Arajibirei) is a hybrid monster born from a prehistoric porcupine fossil and a prehistoric stingray fossil. Almost impossible to kill, Arajibiray could encase its victims in a cocoon that eventually killed them. With the help of a crystal that Genji found, Tentou used Impact Flash to finally kill Arajibiray.
- Darkness Combined Beast Tokasuzura (暗黒合成獣トカスズラ, Ankoku Gōseijū Tokasuzura) is a hybrid monster born from a prehistoric swordfish fossil, a Tyrrhenian mole fossil, and a prehistoric chameleon fossil. He could fire an acid that could melt the Neo Insect Armor (affecting both Kabuto and Tentou and later Min), change color to be invisible, and disappear, and digs underground. Tokasuzura was killed by the four B-Fighters: by Min with his Ringer Swords, Kuwagar with Gravity Crash, Tentou with Crossway Slicer, and Kabuto using the Input Rifle.
- Darkness One-Horned Beast Misty Horn (闇の一角獣ミスティ・ホーン, Yami no Ikkakujū Misuti Hōn) is a unicorn-resembling monster with no backstory. She was finished off by Kuwagar using the Input Rifle in a technique he called "Kuwagatic Buster".
- Darkness Devil Beast Zadan (闇の悪魔獣ザダン, Yami no Akumajū Zadan) is a devil-resembling monster with no backstory. After using the Input Cardguns and Bloom Cannon to destroy Zadan's horn, he was killed by the B-Fighters' signature attacks.
- Darkness Wave Beast Dargriffon (闇の波動獣ダーグリフォン, Yamino Hadōjū Dāgurifon) is a 2-faced griffin monster born from a cave lion fossil and a Haast's eagle fossil where it has an eagle head with a lion head above it. He is able to emit dark shockwaves from his chest to affect everything insect-related, and ensure the spread of darkness. Though he overpowered the new team, the first-generation B-Fighters arrive and managed to slow Dargriffon down with their newest weapon. The monster later returns. The B-Fighters hold it at bay until the original B-Fighters again appeared while Guru sacrifices himself. The original B-Fighters negated Dargriffon's power so the new team could finish him off with their signature attacks.

== Episodes ==
1. The Second Generation is a High School Warrior (２代目は高校戦士, Nidaime wa Kōkō Senshi): written by Junichi Miyashita, directed by Shohei Tojo
2. The Trilobite's After School Invitation (三葉虫は放課後誘う, Sanyōchū wa Hōkago Sasō): written by Junichi Miyashita, directed by Shohei Tojo
3. Awaken!! The Neo Machines (目覚めよ！！新マシン, Mezame yo!! Neo Mashin): written by Junichi Miyashita, directed by Kaneharu Mitsumura
4. Vow!! The Heated Stag Beetle (誓え！！熱きクワガタ, Chikae!! Atsuki Kuwagata): written by Junichi Miyashita, directed by Kaneharu Mitsumura
5. A Great Reversal to the You that Departed (大逆転去りゆく君へ, Daigyakuten Sariyuku Kimi e): written by Nobuo Ogizawa, directed by Hidenori Ishida
6. A Great Wild Battle at the Cherry Blossom Festival!! (桜祭りで大乱戦！！, Sakura Matsuri de Dairansen): written by Akira Asaka, directed by Hidenori Ishida
7. The Raging Iron Fist presented by a Friend (友に捧ぐ怒りの鉄拳, Tomo ni Sasagu Ikari no Tekken): written by Junichi Miyashita, directed by Shohei Tojo
8. Kabuto Finally Leaves School!? (カブトついに退学！？, Kabuto Tsuini Taigaku!?): written by Yasuko Kobayashi, directed by Shohei Tojo
9. Becoming a Pupil of the Storytelling Monster!! (弟子入り落語怪物！！, Deshi Iri Rakugo Kaibutsu): written by Nobuo Ogizawa, directed by Kaneharu Mitsumura
10. The Showdown with the Martial Arts Master (対決格闘技マスター, Taiketsu Kakutōgi Masutā): written by Akira Asaka, directed by Kaneharu Mitsumura
11. Shoot Across the Sea of Tears (涙の海を越えて撃て, Namida no Umi o Koete Ute): written by Junichi Miyashita, directed by Osamu Kaneda
12. Mysterious?! The Fossil's Fantastic Maze (謎？！化石の夢幻迷宮, Nazo?! Kaseki no Mugen Meikyū): written by Kyoko Sagiyama, directed by Osamu Kaneda
13. Change!! The Explosive Dashing Professor (チェンジ！！爆走博士, Chenji!! Bakusō Hakase): written by Akira Asaka, directed by Hidenori Ishida
14. The Cry that Destroyed the Trapped Town (罠の街消された悲鳴, Wana no Kaishō Sareta Himei): written by Yasuko Kobayashi, directed by Hidenori Ishida
15. Infiltrate the Hospital Ward of Terror (恐怖病棟に潜入せよ, Kyōfu Byōtō ni Sennyū seyo): written by Junichi Miyashita, directed by Shohei Tojo
16. Save the School Anniversary's Idols (救え学園祭アイドル, Sukue Gakuensai Aidoru): written by Junichi Miyashita, directed by Shohei Tojo
17. The Fighting Love-Foretelling Diary!! (戦う恋占い日記！！, Tatakau Kou Uranai Nikki!!): written by Junichi Miyashita, directed by Kaneharu Mitsumura
18. The 20-Million Year Revenge of the Exterminated Flower (絶滅花２億年の復讐, Zetsumetsubana Niokunen no Fukushū): written by Kyoko Sagiyama, directed by Kaneharu Mitsumura
19. Is the Summertime Girl a Mermaid Princess?! (夏の彼女は人魚姫？！, Natsu no Kanojo wa Ningyohime?!): written by Akira Asaka, directed by Hidenori Ishida
20. The 3000 Ri Kappa Hunt!! (河童訪ねて三千里！！, Kappa Tazunete Sanzenri!!): written by Nobuo Ogizawa, directed by Hidenori Ishida
21. Call the Rain, The Heroic Crybaby (雨を呼べ泣き虫英雄, Ame o Yobe Nakimushi Eiyū): written by Yasuko Kobayashi, directed by Shohei Tojo
22. The Flaming Mistress' Roaring Shamisen (轟く三味線炎の女将, Todoroku Shamisen Honō no Okami): written by Junichi Miyashita, directed by Shohei Tojo
23. Run to the Wilderness of Pride!! (誇りの荒野を走れ！！, Hokori no Kōya o Hashire!!): written by Nobuo Ogizawa, directed by Kaneharu Mitsumura
24. Summer Vacation!! The Haunted Classroom (夏休み！！怪談教室, Natsuyasumi!! Kaidan Kyōshitsu): written by Kyoko Sagiyama, directed by Kaneharu Mitsumura
25. Those Guys Have Returned (帰ってきたアイツ達, Kaettekita Aitsutachi): written by Junichi Miyashita, directed by Osamu Kaneda
26. Nightmare!! B-Fighter vs. B-Fighter (悪夢！！ＢＦ対ＢＦ, Akumu!! Bī Faitā Tai Bī Faitā): written by Junichi Miyashita, directed by Osamu Kaneda
27. The Certain Death of the 6 Great Warriors (６大戦士絶体絶命, Rokudai Senshi Zettai Zetsumei): written by Junichi Miyashita, directed by Osamu Kaneda
28. Enter!! The Insect Warrior of the Wind (見参！！風の昆虫戦士, Kenzan!! Kaze no Konchū Senshi): written by Junichi Miyashita, directed by Shohei Tojo
29. The Violent Centipede General (暴れん坊ムカデ将軍, Abarenbō Mukade Shōgun): written by Junichi Miyashita, directed by Shohei Tojo
30. Shine Genji, the Earth's Power (輝けゲンジ大地の力, Kagayake Genji Daichi no Chikara): written by Kyoko Sagiyama, directed by Hidenori Ishida
31. The Combined Ultimate Gun and the Mournful Warrior (合体最強銃と哀戦士, Gattai Saikyōjū to Ai Senshi): written by Nobuo Ogizawa, directed by Hidenori Ishida
32. Echo, The Beautiful Butterfly's Melody (響け美しき蝶の旋律, Hibike Utsukushiki Chō no Senritsu): written by Akira Asaka, directed by Kaneharu Mitsumura
33. Grab it!! The Legendary Sacred Sword (つかめ！！伝説の神剣, Tsukame!! Densetsu no Shinken): written by Akira Asaka, directed by Kaneharu Mitsumura
34. Control!? The B-Fighters' Day of Defeat (制圧！？ＢＦ敗北の日, Seiatsu!? Bī Faitā Haiboku no Hi): written by Junichi Miyashita, directed by Shohei Tojo
35. Rip Through the Darkness, The Revived Giant God (闇を裂け復活の巨神, Yami o Sake Fukkatsu no Kyoshin): written by Junichi Miyashita, directed by Shohei Tojo
36. Dirty!! The Demonic Brothers' Counterattack (卑劣！！魔兄弟の逆襲, Hiretsu!! Ma Kyōdai no Gyakushū): written by Yasuko Kobayashi, directed by Hidenori Ishida
37. Defeat, The Invincible New Monster (倒せ不死身の新怪人, Taose Fujimi no Shin Kaijin): written by Kyoko Sagiyama, directed by Hidenori Ishida
38. The Nightmarish Giant Stag Beetle (悪夢のオオクワガタ, Akumu no Ō Kuwagata): written by Junichi Miyashita, directed by Kaneharu Mitsumura
39. Merciless!! The B-Fighters are Melting (無惨！！ＢＦが溶ける, Muzan!! Bī Faitā ga Tokeru): written by Nobuo Ogizawa, directed by Kaneharu Mitsumura
40. Break Through the Maze of Love (駆け抜けろ恋の迷宮, Kakenukero Koi no Meikyū): written by Yasuko Kobayashi, directed by Shohei Tojo
41. The No-Rules Peak Battle (ルール無用頂上決戦, Rūru Muyō Chōjō Kessen): written by Akira Asaka, directed by Shohei Tojo
42. Kabuto's Trip To The Moon World (カブトの月世界旅行, Kabuto no Tsuki Sekai Ryokō): written by Junichi Miyashita, directed by Hidenori Ishida
43. The Girl of Darkness is the B-Fighter Killer (闇の娘はＢＦキラー, Yami no Musume wa Bī Faitā Kirā): written by Akira Asaka, directed by Hidenori Ishida
44. The Devil Girl Arrives... (悪魔少女来たりて..., Akuma Shōjo Kitarite...): written by Kyoko Sagiyama, directed by Kaneharu Mitsumura
45. B-Fighter!! A Challenge in History (ＢＦ！！歴史に挑戦, Bī Faitā!! Rekishi ni Chōsen): written by Nobuo Ogizawa, directed by Kaneharu Mitsumura
46. The Super Heavy Shell Strike! (超重甲ストライキ！, Chō Jūkō Sutoraiki): written by Yasuko Kobayashi, directed by Shohei Tojo
47. The B-Fighters' Father, the Elder Dies!! (ＢＦの父 老師死す！！, Bī Faitā no Chichi Rōshi Shisu!!): written by Junichi Miyashita, directed by Shohei Tojo
48. The Beetle Base's Great Explosion!! (ＢＦ基地(ビートルベース)大爆破？！, Bītoru Bēsu Daibakuha?!): written by Junichi Miyashita, directed by Shohei Tojo
49. The Sunrise of The Earth's Downfall (地球滅亡の夜明け, Chikyū Metsubō no Yoake): written by Junichi Miyashita, directed by Hidenori Ishida
50. The Last Battle (ラストバトル, Rasuto Batoru): written by Junichi Miyashita, directed by Hidenori Ishida

== Cast ==
- Kouhei Toba: Hideomi Nakasato (中里 栄臣, Nakasato Hideomi)
- Kengo Tachibana: Naohisa Adachi (足立 直久, Adachi Naohisa) (Played as Naoto Adachi (安達 直人, Adachi Naoto))
- Ran Ayukawa, Fake Ran (30): Yukina Kurisu (栗栖 ゆきな, Kurisu Yukina)
- Masaru Osanai: Ryoichi Yamaguchi (山口 良一, Yamaguchi Ryōichi)
- Yui Toba: Kaori Asoh (麻生 かおり, Asō Kaori)
- Mack: Reuben Langdon (ルーベン・ラングダン, Rūben Rangudan)
- Sophie Villeneuve: Reika Hashimoto (橋本 麗香, Hashimoto Reika)
- Li Wen: Hideki Anzai (安斉 英樹, Anzai Hideki)
- Julio Rivera: Seiji Takaiwa (高岩 成二, Takaiwa Seiji)
- Dinosaur Warrior Raija: Akira Ooka (大岡 旭, Ōoka Akira)
- Insect Swordswoman Miola: Akiko Yoshio (吉尾 亜希子, Yoshio Akiko)

=== Voice cast ===
- Artificial Life Bit: Tomoe Hanba (半場 友恵, Hanba Tomoe)
- B-Fighter Yanma: Kōichi Tōchika (遠近 孝一, Tōchika Kōichi)
- Shell God Seal Sword Astral Saber: Ryūzaburō Ōtomo (大友 龍三郎, Ōtomo Ryūzaburō)
- Mother Melzard: Wakana Yamazaki (山崎 和佳奈, Yamazaki Wakana)
- Deep Sea Fish-man Dezzle: Kaneto Shiozawa (塩沢 兼人, Shiozawa Kaneto)
- Rock Shell Chamberlain Dord: Hiroshi Masuoka (増岡 弘, Masuoka Hiroshi)
- Deadly Poison Armored General Descorpion: Tetsu Inada (稲田 徹, Inada Tetsu)
- Cold-Blooded Armored General Mukaderinger: Masuo Amada (天田 益男, Amada Masuo)
- Demon Blade Armored General Killmantis: Takao Ishii (石井 隆夫, Ishii Takao)
- Mirage Armored General Beezack: Yutaka Aoyama (青山 穣, Aoyama Yutaka)

=== Guest cast ===
- Takuya Kai (1, 25-27, 47): Daisuke Tsuchiya
- Sage Guru (1, 25-29, 32-35, 47): Yasuo Tanaka
- Megumi Nakajima (2): Reiko Okabe
- Takashi Nakajima (2): Kyohei Iizuka
- Akane (3): Asuka Yamaguchi
- Atsuko Endo (5): Mika Omine
- Akio (5): Hiroshi Sakamoto
- Yumiko (5): Eri Shimizu
- Genzo (6): Kenichi Matsuno
- Kikonosuke (6):Takeshi Yamazaki
- Tatsuyoshi (6): Enryu Sanyutei
- Yano Family (7)
  - Kazuya Yano: Kotaro Yoshida
  - Natsumi Yano: Masumi Ogawa
  - Ryuzaburo Yano: Satoshi Kurihara
- Toshiya Hirano (8): Koichi Nagata
- Teacher (8, 16): Yuzo Ogura
- Shinosuke Ima (9): Shintaro Mizushima
- Master (9): Takuya Haronobu
- Eiji (10): Hidenori Tokuyama
- Toru (10): Yoshiko Tonawa
- Yamada (10): Akira Amamiya
- Kohei's Friend (10, 14): Tsuyoshi Sugawara
- Erika Shiraishi (11, 50): Tina Kawamura
- Hiroshi (12): Kenta Uchino
- Shunsuke (13, 50): Yūta Mochizuki
- Haruka Satsuki (14): Megumi Nishimura
- Mari Hayase (15): Rina Sato
- Kazue Hayase (15): Mariko Sakai
- Nurse (15): Hiroko Kamei
- Naoya (16): Yasuyuki Fukuba
- Doctor (17): Yoshiaki Wakao
- Staff Member(17): Hirofumi Ishigaki
- Lia/Kana (18): Asuka Umemiya
- Lia (voice - 18): Yukari Nozawa
- Marina (19): Misao Oka
- Swimming Club's Captain (19): Yoshiyuki Uchiyama
- Yoshizo Hiraoka (20): Kazuma Suzuki
- Tokuko Hiraoka (20): Kanako Nakatake
- Kyoichi Nakagawa (21): Masahide Hirai
- Reporter (21): Hideki Fukushi
- Bunzo Kariya (22): Bunmei Tonamiyama
- Bullies (23): Yugo Mori, Yuki Takamura, Yuichi Tada & Kazuki Ogawa
- Chikako (24): Akane Kaiho
- Daisaku Katagiri (25-27, 47): Shigeru Kanai
- Mai Takatori (25-27, 47): Chigusa Tomoe
- Beezack's human form (30): Akemi Fuji
- Beezack's human form (32): Michihiko Hamada
- People who listen Sophie's performance (32): Yoko Koyanagi
- Cabin Attendant (34):Naoko Hiroshima
- Doctor (37, 43): Toshio Matsuo
- Announcer (42): Isao Kishimoto
- Eri/Fake Eri (Zadan's human form) (44): Nanako Hotomi
- Yukio Suzuki (44): Toshiya Baba
- Yukio's mother (44): Jun Matsumoto
- Museum Staff (45): Wataru Abe
- BF Fans (45): Nagatoshi Saegusa, Yamato Tachikawa
- Ryosuke Takano (46): Yosuke Ishii
- Takano's wife (46): Rikako Sato
- Takano's son (46): Yuta Suzuki
- Boy who Yui cares in the hospital (50): Yusuke Osawa
- Kabuto (voice) (50): Takahiro Yoshimizu

== Songs ==
Opening theme

- "B-Fighter Kabuto" (ビーファイターカブト, Bīfaitā Kabuto)
  - Lyrics: Yoko Aki (阿木 燿子, Aki Yōko)
  - Composition: Ryudo Uzaki (宇崎 竜童, Uzaki Ryūdō)
  - Arrangement: Eiji Kawamura (川村 栄二, Kawamura Eiji)
  - Artist: Nobuhiko Kashiwara (樫原 伸彦, Kashiwara Nobuhiko)
    - The song's full version is used as the ending for episode 50

Ending theme

- "Ōgoe de Utaeba" (大声で歌えば; "If I Sing Loudly") (1-49)
  - Lyrics: Yoko Aki
  - Composition: Ryudo Uzaki
  - Arrangement: Eiji Kawamura
  - Artist: Nobuhiko Kashiwara
    - The instrumental version is used as insert song for episode 50

== International Broadcasting and Home Video ==
- In its home country of Japan, the series was released on Sale and Rental VHS by Toei Video from March 1997 to February 1998 in full with all episodes spread throughout 12 volumes. Each volume contains four episodes, while the final volume contained five episodes. Then from November 21, 2006, to March 21, 2007, Toei Video then released the series on DVD for the first time spread through five volumes and each holding two discs. Each DVD volume release contains 10 episodes.
- In the Philippines, despite the American-produced Bettleborgs Metallix aired on GMA Network in 1998, it was given a Tagalog dub and aired on IBC from 2000 to 2001 under the title of Beetle Fighters Platinum.
- In Thailand, TIGA Company licensed the series for VCD distribution under Iron Armor B-fighter Kabuto. (นักรบเกราะเหล็ก บี-ไฟท์เตอร์ คาบูโตะ)
