= The People Garden =

- Theatrical release poster
- Directed by: Nadia Litz
- Written by: Nadia Litz
- Produced by: Coral Aiken; Daniel Bekerman; Jonathan Bronfman
- Starring: Dree Hemingway; Pamela Anderson; Jai West; François Arnaud
- Cinematography: Catherine Lutes
- Edited by: Simon Ennis
- Music by: Dirty Beaches
- Production companies: Scythia Films; Aiken Heart Films; JoBro Productions & Film Finance; Nortario Films; Vigilante Productions
- Distributed by: Orion Pictures; Gunpowder & Sky; Pacific Northwest Pictures
- Release dates: April 14, 2016 (Buenos Aires International Independent Film Festival); May 10, 2016 (Canada); September 12, 2016 (United States)
- Running time: 80 minutes
- Countries: Canada; Japan
- Language: English
- Budget: CA$1.2 million

The People Garden is a 2016 Canadian-Japanese drama film written and directed by Nadia Litz and starring Dree Hemingway, Pamela Anderson, Jai West and François Arnaud. The film premiered at the 2016 Buenos Aires International Independent Film Festival.

== Plot ==
Sweetpea (Dree Hemingway) travels to Japan in order to break up with her rocker boyfriend (François Arnaud). While there, she discovers that her boyfriend has disappeared while shooting a music video in the Aokigahara forest, a place popularly used as a suicide site, and she begins to suspect he has died.

== Cast ==
- Dree Hemingway as Sweetpea
- Pamela Anderson as Signe
- Jai West as Mak
- François Arnaud as Jamie

== Development ==
Litz began writing the movie in 2011.
