= Survive Style 5+ =

2004 film directed by Gen Sekiguchi

- Theatrical release poster
- Directed by: Gen Sekiguchi
- Written by: Taku Tada
- Produced by: Hiroyuki Taniguchi
- Starring: Tadanobu Asano; Shihori Kanjiya; Kyōko Koizumi; Jai West; Sonny Chiba; Vinnie Jones
- Edited by: Gen Sekiguchi
- Music by: James Shimoji
- Production company: Tohokushinsha Film
- Release date: 2004
- Running time: 120 minutes
- Country: Japan
- Languages: Japanese; English

Survive Style 5+ is a 2004 Japanese film directed by Gen Sekiguchi and produced by Hiroyuki Taniguchi. It stars Tadanobu Asano, Kyōko Koizumi, Reika Hashimoto, Jai West, Sonny Chiba and Vinnie Jones.

== Synopsis ==
The film follows five simultaneous, loosely linked plot lines, that intertwine and scramble together. A man (Tadanobu Asano) keeps killing his wife (Reika Hashimoto) and burying her in the woods only to find her alive, furious, and waiting for him when he returns home. A suburban family's life is disrupted when the father (Ittoku Kishibe) is permanently hypnotized into believing he is a bird and tries to learn how to fly. A trio of aimless youth pass time by burgling houses. A murderous advertising executive (Kyōko Koizumi) tries to imagine ideas for commercials. The stories clash together through the intervention of a thuggish hitman (Vinnie Jones) and his translator (Yoshiyoshi Arakawa).

== Cast ==
- Tadanobu Asano as Masahiro Ishigaki
- Reika Hashimoto as Mimi, Ishigaki's wife
- Pierre Taki as a motorcycle policeman
- Kyōko Koizumi as Yoko, the commercial businesswoman
- Asumi Miwa as a waitress
- Hiroshi Abe as Aoyama, the hypnotist
- Ittoku Kishibe as Tatsuya Kobayashi, the husband
- Yumi Asō as Misa Kobayashi, the wife
- Shihori Kanjiya as Kaho Kobayashi, the daughter
- Ryūnosuke Kamiki as Keiichi Kobayashi, the son
- Kanji Tsuda as a Tsuda, a burglar
- Yoshiyuki Morishita as Morishita, a burglar
- Jai West as J, a burglar
- Vinnie Jones as Jimmy Funky Knife, an assassin
- Yoshiyoshi Arakawa as Katagiri, the assassin's interpreter
- Tae Kimura as a flight attendant
- Sonny Chiba as Kazama, a pharmaceutical company president
- Tomokazu Miura as Yamauchi, a doctor

== Release ==
Survive Style 5+ was shown at the Locarno Film Festival on August 6, 2004.

== Soundtrack ==
The film's original soundtrack is by James Shimoji, and additionally features songs by Takkyu Ishino and Yasuyuki Okamura, Rob Laufer, Jim Gilstrap, Jess Harnell, and Cake.
