= Jai West =

Canadian Actor

Jai Tatsuto West
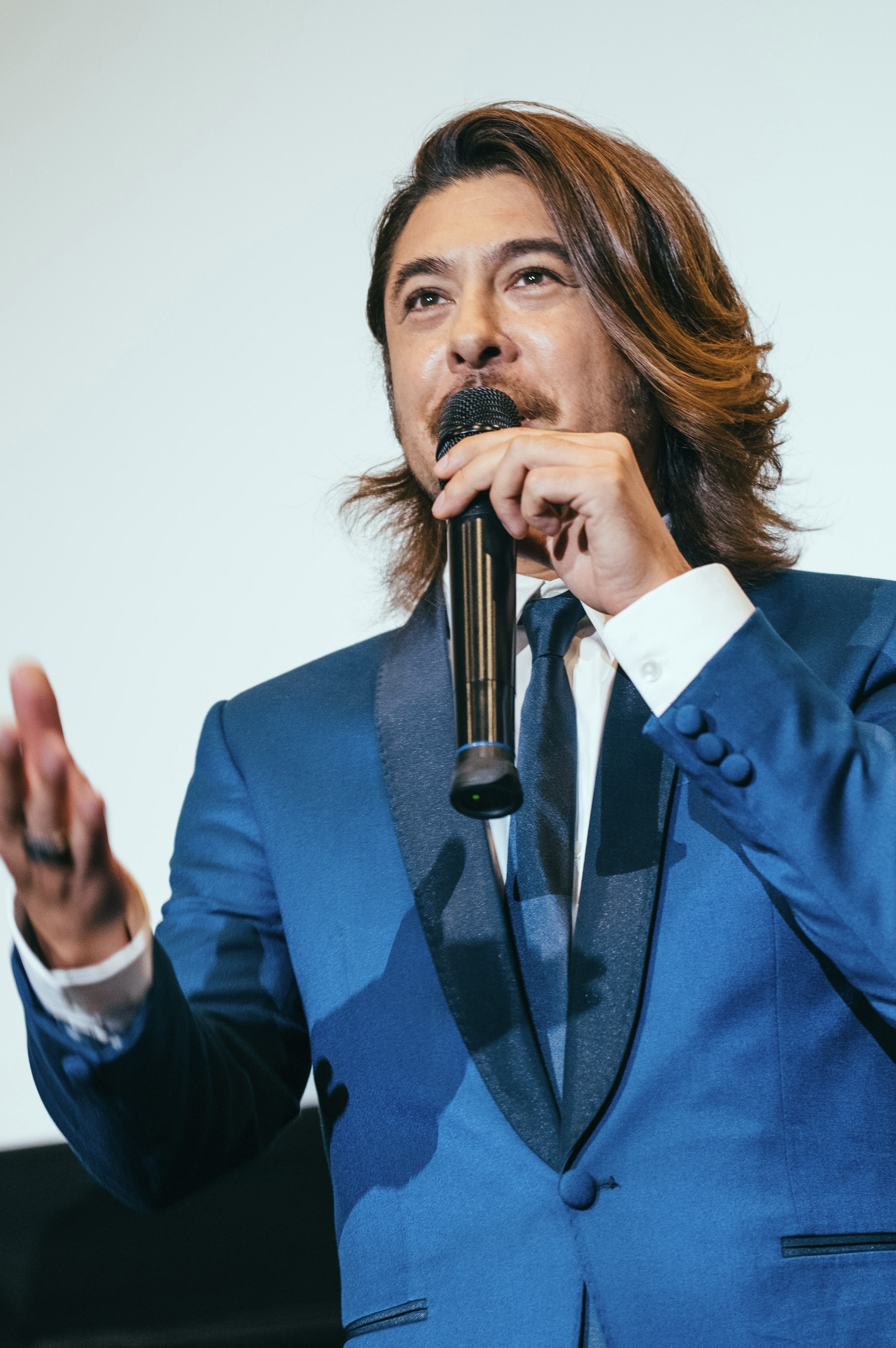
- Jai West at event for Good People in 2019
- Born: Jai Tatsuto West; October 24, 1976 (age 49); Vancouver, British Columbia
- Other names: Jei Uesuto; Lotus Chamelion
- Occupations: Actor, poet
- Years active: 1990 - Present
- Website: www.jaiwest.com

Jai West (ジェイ・ウェスト; born October 24, 1976) is an actor and poet of French Canadian and Japanese descent born in Vancouver, British Columbia and currently based in Tokyo, Japan.

He is best known for his work on screen as manic Japanese American gangster Lee in Sion Sono's Hazard (2005), a thief grappling with his sexual identity in Gen Sekiguchi's Survive Style 5+ (2004), and portraying Beethoven in the popular Tokyo Gas commercials. He has appeared in numerous films and television series, from 21 Jump Street (1990) to Takashi Shimizu's The Great Horror Family (2004) and Takashi Miike's Big Bang Love, Juvenile A (2006). West has released two spoken word poetry albums in Japanese and English under the pseudonym Lotus Chamelion.

In 2018, he became the chairman of Iron Chef Canada.

West is scheduled to publish his debut book, Dragon Man: An Actor’s Transformation, through UK publisher Collective Ink on April 28, 2026, and with a North American edition to follow through Simon & Schuster on May 5, 2026. The memoir chronicles his life in Tokyo as a half-Japanese actor while exploring themes of self-discovery, resilience, and creativity through the lens of Eastern and Western philosophical traditions.

== Career ==
In 2000, West collaborated with his then-girlfriend, J-pop singer Olivia Lufkin, on two tracks for her debut solo studio album, Synchronicity, which was released by Avex Trax. He co-wrote and performed on "Liquid Skies", a whimsical fairy tale about a pegasus and a mermaid coming together to fulfill her longing for wings and "Soulmate", a duet that explores the theme of reincarnation. The album peaked at number twenty on the Oricon Charts.

In 2016, West starred alongside Pamela Anderson and Dree Hemingway in the Canadian-Japanese drama The People Garden. He played a mysterious driver and worker.

In 2018, West was announced as the Iron Chef Canada chairman, which premiered on October 17 on Food Network.

In 2021, West portrayed the arch-villain Lyon Arkland in the Kamen Rider film Zero-one Others: Kamen Rider MetsubouJinrai. The movie's release coincided with the 50th anniversary of the historic tokusatsu superhero franchise. Lyon Arkland is the CEO of ZAIA Enterprise, a global weapons manufacturing company and transforms into Kamen Rider Zaia.

== Filmography ==
=== Film ===
Film
Year	Title	Role	Notes	Ref
1995	Once in a Blue Moon	Mexican Bandito		
2000	Worst Contact	Kerara	Short film	
2001	Bus Panic!!!	The Busjacker	Short film	
2004	Survive Style 5+	J - Burglar		
2004	Lost Samurai	Bob	Short film Writer; Co-producer	
2005	Hazard	Lee		
2006	Hachimitsu to Clover	Man at party		
2006	13 no tsuki	Mori		
2006	Big Bang Love, Juvenile A	Deranged Prisoner		
2006	Cherry Girl	Joji	Direct-to-video	
2007	Tokyo no uso	Tamura		
2007	Tengu Gaiden	Louis	Short film	
2008	Love Exposure	Bosozoku Leader	Credited as Jei Uesuto	
2010	King Game	Johnny B.		
2014	Pancakes	Billy		
2016	The People Garden	Mak	Credited as Jai Tatsuto West	
2016	El Diablo	Foreigner	Short film	
2017	My Little Guidebook	Luke Gardener		
2018	Sid & Aya: Not a Love Story	Club Customer		
2020	Sayo	The Driver		
2021	Zero-One Others: Kamen Rider MetsubouJinrai	Lyon Arkland/Kamen Rider ZAIA	V-cinema	
2021	Prisoners of the Ghostland	Jay		

=== Television ===
Television
Year	Title	Role	Notes	Ref.
1992–1998	KidZone	Himself		
1990	21 Jump Street	Young Ioki		
1993	Highlander	The Kid		
1992	The Odyssey	Feelgood	Episode: "Checkpoint Eagle"	
1994	The Odyssey	Spook	2 episodes	
1995	The Surrogate	Matt	TV film	
2001	Yonimo kimyô na monogatari: Aki no tokubetsu hen	Jack the Rabbit	TV film Segment: "Mama shin hatsubai!" Credited as Jei Uesuto	
2002	The Private Detective Mike	Jake the Bellhop	Known as "Shiritsu tantei Hama Maiku" in Japanese	
2004	X'smap: Tora to raion to gonin no otoko		TV film	
2004	The Great Horror Family	Tonaka Kyoojoorou		
2005	Tameiki no riyû	Tetsuya Ihara		
2007	Ojisan Sensei	Nakategawa	12 episodes	
2018	Iron Chef Canada	The Chairman	2 seasons Chairman of Iron Chef Canada	
