= KidZone =

Television series

- Also known as: Kerrisdale High
- Directed by: Michael Robison; Philip Spink
- Country of origin: Canada
- Original language: English
- No. of seasons: 9

Production
- Production locations: Vancouver, British Columbia

Original release
- Network: Knowledge Network
- Release: 1992 – 2001

KidZone is a Canadian TV show for adolescents that aired on the Knowledge Network in British Columbia from 1992 to 2001. The show is also notable for providing a start for several young stars, including Sarah Chalke, Devon Sawa, Erica Cerra, and Jai West.

== Format ==
KidZone initially began as a series of informative skits and interviews. Following the education mandate of the broadcaster, the show managed to present anti-smoking, safety and environmental issues with funding from provincial government agencies and private companies. The entire cast of the show were children, who acted in various sketches and portrayed journalists. At the age of 12, Chalke was the program's environmental reporter.

One of the recurring sketches on KidZone was Kerrisdale V6M 1Z6, which used a style similar to Beverly Hills, 90210 and Degrassi Junior High to present youth issues. Eventually, KidZone shifted away from its journalistic style and became a docudrama about high school based on the Kerrisdale sketch. This version of the show also aired in the United States as Kerrisdale High.

== KidZone Live ==
At the end of its broadcast run in 2001, KidZone was rebranded as KidZone Live. Much like Degrassi Talks, the show featured KidZone actors participating in sketches and call-in discussions on topics oriented toward young viewers. Among the issues covered on KidZone Live were injury prevention, road safety and eliminating racial discrimination.
