= Takahiro Yoshimizu =

Japanese voice actor and narrator (born 1968)

Takahiro Yoshimizu 吉水 孝宏
- Born: July 31, 1968 (age 57); Osaka Prefecture, Japan
- Occupations: Voice actor Narrator
- Years active: 1988–present

Takahiro Yoshimizu (吉水 孝宏, Yoshimizu Takahiro; born July 31, 1968, in Osaka Prefecture) is a Japanese voice actor and narrator who is affiliated with Aoni Production. He has been active in the voice talent business since 1988.

== Voice Roles ==
=== Television Anime ===
- One Piece - Paulie, Dosun and Lacroix

=== Anime OVA ===
- Legend of the Heroes ~ Trails in the Sky - Walter

=== Games ===
- Castlevania: Curse of Darkness - Hector
- Dynasty Warriors Series - Zhou Yu, Xu Zhu
- One Piece: Pirates' Carnival - Paulie
- Fist of the North Star: Ken's Rage 2 - Shew
- The Legend of Heroes: Trails Through Daybreak II - Walter Kron
- Tales of Symphonia - Forcystus
- Sword of the Berserk: Guts' Rage - Dante

=== Tokusatsu ===
- Juukou B-Fighter - Extradimensional Supplier Kabuto (eps. 35, 36, 52 & 53)
- Gamera 2: Attack of Legion
- B-Fighter Kabuto - Extradimensional Supplier Kabuto (ep. 50)
- Gamera 3: The Revenge of Iris
- Mirai Sentai Timeranger - Arms Smuggler Hammer (ep. 29)
- Tokusou Sentai Dekaranger - Ring announcer (ep. 26)
- Engine Sentai Go-onger vs. Gekiranger - Savage Land Water Sky Special Barbaric Machine Beast Nunchaku Banki
- Zyuden Sentai Kyoryuger: It's Here! Armed On Midsummer Festival!! - Debo Tangosekku, Debo Tanabanta
