= Anqingosaurus =

Anqingosaurus Temporal range: Middle Paleocene

Scientific classification
- Domain: Eukaryota
- Kingdom: Animalia
- Phylum: Chordata
- Class: Reptilia
- Order: Squamata
- Suborder: Iguania
- Family: Chamaeleonidae (?)
- Genus: †Anqingosaurus; Hou, 1976
- Species: †A. brevicephalus

Binomial name
- †Anqingosaurus brevicephalus Hou, 1976

Synonyms
- Anguingosaurus brevicephalus

Extinct genus of lizards

Anqingosaurus brevicephalus is an extinct lizard from the early Middle Paleocene of Anhui, China. A. brevicephalus was originally described as a chameleon, but, not all authorities agree with this. If A. brevicephalus is a chameleon, then Chamaeleonidae fossil record extends all the way into the Paleocene. If it is not, then Chamaeleonidae fossil record starts in the Early Miocene with Chamaeleo caroliquarti.
