= Juukou B-Fighter =

Japanese tokusatsu television series from 1995

- Also known as: Beetle Fighter
- Genre: Tokusatsu; Superhero fiction Science fiction Military fiction
- Created by: Saburō Yatsude
- Written by: Junichi Miyashita
- Directed by: Shinichiro Sawai
- Starring: Daisuke Tsuchiya; Shigeru Kanai; Reina Hazuki; Chigusa Tomoe; Keisuke Tsuchiya; Takashi Sasano
- Narrated by: Minoru Inaba
- Country of origin: Japan
- Original language: Japanese
- No. of episodes: 53

Production
- Running time: 25 minutes
- Production companies: TV Asahi; Toei Company; Asatsu

Original release
- Network: ANN (TV Asahi)
- Release: February 5, 1995 – February 25, 1996

Related
- Blue SWAT; B-Fighter Kabuto

Juukou B-Fighter (重甲ビーファイター, Jūkō Bī Faitā), is a 1995 Japanese tokusatsu television series. B-Fighter is short for "Beetle Fighter". It was part of Toei's Metal Hero Series franchise. It dealt with three members of the prestigious Earth Academia (アースアカデミア, Āsu Akademia) fighting against the evil forces of the otherworldly Jamahl Empire. Action footage and props from this series were reused for the American TV series Big Bad Beetleborgs. Juukou B-Fighter was followed by a sequel/spinoff series, B-Fighter Kabuto.

== Storyline ==
Insects all over the world begin to swarm for unknown reasons, with other animals and plants acting strangely as well. To investigate this, Takuya Kai is dispatched with an Earth Academia group. Investigating independently, Takuya encounters the insect elder Guru, who reveals that insects are preparing for battle against invaders from another dimension called the Jamahl. Offering their aid, the Earth Academia create suits of armor to combat the threat as the Jamahl arrive to Earth to enslave humans. Though they have trouble perfecting the Bio-Machinery, Guru arrives to infuse the armor with the life force of many insects. Once the suits become the B-Commanders, one suit chooses Takuya while the other two bond to Daisaku Katagiri and Rei Hayama. With their newfound power, the B-Fighters fight to drive back Jamahl's forces.

== Characters ==
=== B-Fighters ===
The eponymous B-Fighters use Bio-armor developed by the Earth Academia's brightest and infused with the life force of insects.

- Takuya Kai/Blue Beet (甲斐(かい) 拓也(たくや)／ブルービート, Kai Takuya/Burū Bīto) is a 23-year-old entomologist at the Earth Academia Japan Branch and is the team leader. He is very tender-hearted. His sense of responsibility is very strong. The first to meet Guru in the South American rainforest, he was also the first to gain a B-Commander and use his suit. As Blue Beet, his armor is modeled after a Japanese rhinoceros beetle. His blood was used in the creation of his "evil twin", Shadow. After learning the true colors of Shadow, he feels responsible and goes missing. In the second half of the series, Blue Beet gains the ability to evolve into Super Blue Beet (スーパーブルービート, Sūpā Burū Bīto) by the command "Metal-Phose!" (重甲超進化(メタルフォーゼ), Metarufōze).
- Daisaku Katagiri/G-Stag (片霧(かたぎり) 大作(だいさく)／ジースタッグ, Katagiri Daisaku/Jī Sutaggu) is a 23-year-old impetuous but nature-loving man. A tree doctor, Daisaku claims to be able to hear trees and plants when they are dying. He was captured along with Rei by the Jamahl during the start of the invasion of Earth. Upon receiving his B-Commander, Daisaku made quick work of Jamar soldiers. He was aquaphobic until he overcame his fear to save his father Daitetsu, a fisherman, from a trap laid by the Ebikaania. As G-Stag, his armor is modeled after a stag beetle. He is strong enough to lift the Jamar soldiers and toss them around like rag dolls.
- Reddle (レッドル, Reddoru) is the third member of the B-Fighters whose moniker is utilized by its original user and her successor. As Reddle, their armor is modeled after a ladybug.
  - Rei Hayama (羽山(はやま) 麗(れい), Hayama Rei; 1–21) is a 22-year-old animal instructor at Earth Academia's Aquarium. Captured along with Daisaku at first and receiving her B-Commander at the same time, she demolished the Jamar soldiers before joining forces with Takuya and Daisaku. She eventually left for the South American branch of Earth Academia to do research and help with protecting the wildlife there.
  - Mai Takatori (鷹取(たかとり) 舞(まい), Takatori Mai; 22–53) is a young and cheerful 19-year-old student who was "chosen" by Rei's B-Commander as the next Reddle. Mai has a positive look on life and tries to see the good in everything. She also has a love for Daisaku and animals.

==== Allies ====
- Kenzo Mukai (向井(むかい) 健三(けんぞう), Mukai Kenzō) is the chief of the Earth Academia's Japanese branch, dedicated to the pursuit of justice. He fell in love with Sayuri, a plant researcher, many years ago, but left her. When they meet again during Rasbelga's attack, Mukai donned a special armor and donned the title of "Mukaider K3" (ムカイダーK3, Mukaidā Kē Surī) to save her, with attacks like Mukaider Magnum (ムカイダーマグナム, Mukaidā Magunamu), Mukaider Kick (ムカイダーキック, Mukaidā Kikku), Mukaider Punch (ムカイダーパンチ, Mukaidā Panchi), and Mukaider Feint (ムカイダーフェイント, Mukaidā Feinto). He works as a "mentor" for the B-Fighters, usually working at Earth Academia to assist the team by leading research on Jamahl's warriors and developing new weaponry and vehicles for the B-Fighters.
- Sage Guru (老師グル, Rōshi Guru) is the elder of the insect tribe, and looks like a big brown rhinobeetle. He carries a staff with a curled top and was the one who gave the B-Fighters their powers. Guru possesses great mystical power of his own.
- Drago (ドラゴ, Dorago; Movie) is another insect warrior. Drago lost any memory of his past until his fight with Blue Beet restores it. His powers are dragonfly-based. Once learning who he really was, he helped the B-Fighters defeat Hellsgyra.
- Mercenary Gorgodal (傭兵戦士ゴルゴダル, Gorugodaru) is an armored warrior one of Jera's mercenaries who fights the B-Fighters for the money. When Mai scolds him for following Jera and ultimately Jamahl for money, Gorgodal quits and tries to return the money he has been paid. But Gaohm didn't accept this and brainwashes Gorgodal so that he is nothing but a raging monster. Mai tries to talk to him again, but he can barely remember her name. Reddle eventually destroys Gorgodal by using her Saber Magnum. He is given a burial and his grave is marked with his own shuriken.
- Lala (ラーラ, Rāra) is a scientist from the Aroa dimension who falls in love with Takuya.
- Kaori (香) is a ghost called forth by one of Jera's soldiers, who breaks free of his control and helps fight against him.
- Night Biker (ナイトバイカー, Naito Baikā) is originally Kazuma Iwata, a reckless biker. He is put in Jamhal's "Survival School" with Mai who tries to get him and the other captured people out of the School. Kazuma is brainwashed and changed into an evil armored warrior by a machine used by Jera. The control device is in his bike's fairing, and when that was destroyed, Night Biker changed back into back to normal Kazuma.
- Babanba (ババンバ) appears first as an old woman in a brown kimono with a brown cloth over her head and a wooden cask on her back. She can suck people inside the cask, which she uses to turn them into pickles for sale to creatures in other dimensions. She later revealed her true form, a demonic creature that can sprout and attack with claws and fangs. Babamba is not truly evil, and although Jera tries to trick her into fighting the B-Fighters, an old man who had befriended her convinces her that she doesn't need to fight anymore. She decides to stay in this dimension with him and shatters her cask freeing the people inside.
- Nero (ネロ) is a so-called bodyguard from another dimension who wears cowboy-like attire. He appears during a fight and offers Jera his services, but in the fight he misses the B-Fighters and escapes back to Jamahl for his pay. Later, he approaches the B-Fighters and claimed that he was just trying to infiltrate Jamahl to take out Gaohm, and if they pay him he would do just that. Mai believes him and scrounges up enough to pay him. Nero is planning to take money from both sides and leave this dimension, when Mai discovers that he has Jamahl money. Jera also appears, having discovered his secret, impales Nero. Meanwhile, Mai had scanned Nero's gun, learning that it was designed to miss. Nero hates war, and never means to kill anyone. He dies after telling Mai to end the fight quickly, because war is a terrible thing.
- Sinbad (シンバッド, Shinbaddo) is a contestant in Jamahl's "Ghost Zone" battle, for which they kidnapped the B-Fighters and sent them to another dimension where they forced them to participate in combat. Daisaku soon learned that Sinbad was infiltrating Jamahl in an attempt to assassinate Gaohm for destroying his homeworld. Gaohm learned of this, however, and sent a resurrected Death Mult to kill Sinbad and the B-Fighters. Realizing that the only way for the B-Fighters to return home was by the explosion caused by Death Mult's demise, Sinbad kamikazed Death Mult and killed them both. Before the B-Fighters became free and left the dimension, Sinbad asked them to defeat Gaohm and the Jamahl.
- Extradimensional Supplier Kabuto (異次元調達屋カブト, Ijigen Chōtatsuya Kabuto) is Guru's son who left his father a hundred years ago and has been traveling across the dimensions as a supplier of weapons and equipment. He returns to Earth to visit his mother's grave, bringing the Beet Ingram with him. Very childish and naive, Kabuto often tries to be a hero, only to put himself in danger. He returns at the end of the series to assist the other Metal Heroes in defeating Jagul.
- Saint Papilia (セントパピリア, Sento Papiria) is a legendary "butterfly of life" who can grant immortality. She appears when the life on a world has been destroyed. She then revives the world by giving it new life. Saint Papilia already appeared once on Earth, after the Ice Age, and revived the Earth so the life of today could be born and grow. Saint Papilia has also revived Muscle during the course of her existence. Both Gaohm and Black Beet sought Saint Papilia in the hopes of obtaining her gift of eternal life. After defeating Shadow, Takuya was severely wounded and died. Saint Papilia appeared above him and resurrected him, saying that Earth still needed him.
- Muscle (マッスル, Massuru) is a mysterious armored amphibious alien who arrives on Earth with a shining feather that belongs to Saint Papilia. He was once healed by her power, and has followed clues about her to Earth. Already weakened upon his arrival on Earth, Muscle confronts both the B-Fighters and the Jamahl forces, only to be killed by Black Beet. Black Beet then gains possession of Papilia's feather. He is more of a guest character than a malevolent alien.
- Janperson and Gun Gibson are robotic detective heroes from the 1993 Metal Hero Series Tokusou Robo Janperson. They assisted the B-Fighters in their battle against Jagul at the end of the series.
- Blue SWAT (ブルースワット, Burū Suwatto) are a trio of special, heavily armed alien-destroying heroes composed of Show Narumi, Sara Misugi, and Sig. They were three main heroes from the 1994 Metal Hero Series Blue SWAT. Sara and Mai were captured by Jagul. Show, Sig, Janperson and Gun Gibson rescued the B-Fighters.

==== Arsenal ====
- B-Commanders (ビーコマンダー, Bī Komandā) are the B-Fighters' transformation and communication devices. The B-Fighters' bio-armor suits are stored in a shrunken form within the B-Commanders. Their transform command is "Juukou!" (重甲!, Jūkō!; Heavy Shell!). The B-Commanders later disappear with Guru's death in B-Fighter Kabuto.
- Input Magnums (インプットマグナム, Inputto Magunamu): The Input Magnum is the B-Fighters' sidearm. It has a ten-key pad on the side, and by keying in different combinations of three numbers the gun can fire a variety of different projectiles, although not all of these are used in the show.
  - 110: Beam Mode (can also be used in Saber Magnum mode)
  - 119: Fire Extinguishing Mode or Cooling Mode
  - 010: Freezing Mode
  - 818: Flame Mode
  - 964: Flash Mode
  - 108: Ultrasonic Beam
  - 026: Boiling Water Mode
  - 289: Magnetic Beam
  - 305: Torimochi Bullets
  - 264: Flash Bullets
  - 967: Anti-Gravity Beam
  - 049: Rescue Signal
  - 088: Laughing Gas
  - 409: Anesthetic
  - 054: Recovery
- Stinger Weapons (スティンガーウェポン, Sutingā Wepon) are the B-Fighters' signature wrist-mounted weapons.
  - Stinger Blade (スティンガーブレード, Sutingā Burēdo) is Blue Beet's triangular sword-like Stinger Weapon. Its powerful attack is the Beetle Break (ビートルブレイク, Bītoru Bureiku)
  - Stinger Claw (スティンガークロー, Sutingā Kurō) is G-Stag's Stinger Weapon, a large yellow pincer-like claw that he can use to crush enemies or grab them. It can also be used as the Stinger Boomerang (スティンガーブーメラン, Sutingā Būmeran). Its powerful attack is the Raging Slash (レイジングスラッシュ, Reijingu Surasshu).
  - Stinger Plasmar (スティンガープラズマー, Sutingā Purazumā) is Reddle's Stinger Weapon. It has an array of 4 red beam emitters that fire powerful beams of red ion energy. Its powerful attack is the Tornado Spark (トルネードスパーク, Torunēdo Supāku).
- Stinger Drill (スティンガードリル, Sutingā Doriru) is an augmented Stinger Weapon used by Blue Beet after a fight with Black Beet damaged the Stinger Blade. A large drill attaches to the wrist-piece of the Stinger Weapon. The front and back halves of the drill rotate in opposite directions, and his attack with it is the Strike Blast (ストライクブラスト, Sutoraiku Burasuto), a charging stab that bores a hole through his enemies. It first appeared in episode 21.
- Pulsabers (パルセイバー, Paruseibā) are short swords modeled after a Hercules beetle with a gold blade which first appeared in episode 22. Used by each of the B-Fighters, they have voice-activated features and can be used with Mega Herakles. With this each fighter can execute the PulSlash (パルスラッシュ, Parusurasshu), a diagonal slash with the Pulsaber. The Pulsaber can also attach to the top of the Input Magnum to form the Saber Magnum.
- Saber Magnums (セイバーマグナム, Seibā Magunamu) is a combination of the Input Magnums and Pulsabers. It can fire a powerful beam of energy in the Maxim Beam Mode (マキシムビームモード, Makishimu Bīmu Mōdo). The Maxim Boiling Water mode was used in Episode 26 in a finishing strike led by G Stag.
- Beet Ingram (ビートイングラム, Bīto Inguramu) is a red and white semi-automatic-like double-barreled gun. Its legend is that it can only be used by a great hero. The top of the Beet Ingram can fold forward and over the barrels so that they are covered by a single barrel with two pincerlike armatures protruding from it. In this mode it can be combined with Blue Beet's Pulsaber by attaching the Pulsaber to the top, to create the Final Mode (ファイナルモード, Fainaru Mōdo), whose power reached full potential when wielded by Super Blue Beet for Super Final Blow (スーパーファイナルブロー, Sūpā Fainaru Burō) attack. The Beet Ingram is seen in a flashback in B-Fighter Kabuto episode 35.
- Sonic Flap (ソニックフラップ, Sonikku Furappu) is the B-Fighters' ultrasonic wave attack.
- Training Robots: Three robot drones built for the B-Fighters to test their arsenal on.
- EIG (Electronic Intense Heat Gun): An experimental thermal laser that shoots a beam of intense heat. It was once used by the B-Fighters when they needed to disable Ikari Bomber's self-detonation chip to defeat him.

==== Beet Machines ====
The Beet Machines (ビートマシン, Bīto Mashin) are the mecha used by the B-Fighters to fight the Jamahl fighter jets, usually summoned by the command, "Beet Machines, launch!" They are housed within the Heavy Shell Base (重甲基地, Jukou Kichi), a large hangar base located beneath the Earth Academia's parking lot; when summoned, the base rises out of the ground, allowing the vehicles to exit (the Beetluder from the front, the Stagger Tank from the right side, and the Red Gyro from the top).

- Beetluder (ビートルーダー, Bītorūdā) is Blue Beet's Beet Machine. From the two tips of its horn, it can fire the Beet Blazer (ビートブレイザー, Bīto Bureizā). It uses the Beet Cannons (ビートキャノン, Bīto Kyanon) and the Rescue Seile (レスキューザイール, Resukyū Zairu). It can attach the Magnet Attachment (マグネアタッチメント, Magune Atatchimento) concealed within the Stagger Tank onto its horn also in Flap Formation. With the magnet in place, the Beetluder can fire the Beetractor (ビートラクター, Bītorakutā).
- Stagger Tank (スタッガータンク, Sutaggā Tanku) is G-Stag's Beet Machine. It has a double-barreled cannon, the Stag Buster (スタッグバスター, Sutaggu Basutā). It uses the Stagger Cannons (スタッガーキャノン, Sutaggā Kyanon) and the Stagger Scissors (スタッガーシザース, Sutaggā Shizāsu). It can attach the Drill Attachment (ドリルアタッチメント, Doriru Atatchimento) stored in the Beetluder in Flap Formation onto its grabbers.
- Red Gyro (レッドジャイロ, Reddo Jairo) is Reddle's Beet Machine. It has two gyro wings and a laser cannon known as the Red Pulser (レッドパルサー, Reddo Parusā). It can attack with the Red Cannons (レッドキャノン, Reddo Kyanon) and the Gyro Typhoon (ジャイロタイフーン, Jairo Taihūn). It contains the Wire Hand (ワイヤーハンド, Waiyā Hando) that can be used with the Beetluder's Magnet Attachment to lift objects. It can fire the Fire Crash (ファイヤークラッシュ, Faiyā Kurasshu), a powerful beam, in Attack Formation (アタックフォーメーション, Atakku Fōmēshon) with the Stagger Tank.
- Mega Herakles (メガヘラクレス, Mega Herakuresu) is the Super Beet Machine (スーパービートマシン, Sūpā Bīto Mashin) based on a Hercules Beetle and controlled with the Pulsabers. It comes via the command "Mega Herakles, launch!". It has an auto-pilot mode and two parts, Jet Herakles (ジットヘラクレス, Jetto Herakuresu); A jet-like vehicle, it serves as the "horn" of the main mecha flown by Blue Beet; and Land Herakles (ランドヘラクレス, Rando Herakuresu), which is made up of the main body. It carries the three mecha of the B-Fighters into battle. Its weapons are the Mega Cannon (メガキャノン, Mega Kyanon), Beam Vulcan (ビームバルカン, Bīmu Barukan) and the Anti-Magnetic Wave (反磁力波, Han Jiryokuha).
- Mega Beet Formation (メガビートフォーメーション, Mega Bīto Fōmēshon): When the three Beet Machines are docked on the top of Mega Herakles in this combination, it can use a massive energy cannon located on its front "horn", called the Mega Beet Cannon (メガビートキャノン, Mega Bīto Kyanon).

=== Jamahl ===
The Jamahl (ジャマール, Jamāru) are beings from another dimension. Their base of operation, was the Jamahl Fortress (ジャマール要塞, Jamāru Yōsai), a claw-like dreadnaught. It had an opening where the palm would be, where the Jamar fighter jets emerged from and where Jamahl's new super-weapons were located.

- Jamahl Leader Gaohm (ジャマール首領ガオーム, Jamāru Shuryō Gaōmu) is the mysterious leader of the Jamahl, who first appeared as a tall figure with a white and purple robe and chitinous face. Gaohm possesses the power to teleport people to the Gaohm Zone (ガオームゾーン, Gaōmu Zōn). Arriving to Earth, Gaohm planned to make the Tokyo Metropolitan Government Building his base until the B-Fighters intervened. He was supposedly killed by the B-Fighters later on, only to reappear as a gigantic torso floating in space with an exposed purple heart, a single one arm (the right one) and wires running all through and over/on his body. However, both forms were dummies used by the real Gaohm, a small embryonic entity in a tank full of liquid. Gaohm reveals that he was born from a space warp and wandered through space until he gained enough power to assemble the Jamahl for his lifelong goal of capturing Saint Papilia so he can obtain immortality. To that end, he plans to destroy all life on Earth, using the Jamahl Hole (ジャマールホール, Jamāru Hōru), by sucking up the world's atmosphere so everyone dies, luring Saint Papilia to revive Earth. Gaohm plans to capture her and force her to give Gaohm immortality. After he creates the Jamahl Hole, he is killed when his fortress crashes on Earth. Gaohm was later revived/absorbed by Jagul in the series finale.
- Mercenary Army Commander Jera (傭兵軍団々長ジェラ, Yōhei Gundan Danchō Jera): A commander in a leotard-like red and pink costume who wears a white mannequin-like face mask and red beret. Outside of battle, she wears a red robe that hampers her full strength. She uses an electromagnetic whip that she could charge with energy, as a weapon. Jera developed a grudge against the B-Fighter since the death of her beloved friend Barla, with Gaohm forcing her not to be consumed by her petty need to avenge her comrade. She assumes a human form named Gira (ジーラ, Jīra). She turns against Gaohm upon learning of Gigaro's death by his hand, allying herself only with Shadow/Black Beet, who had saved her from Schwartz's insane rage upon losing his body. After seeing Gaohm kill Hidra, Jera rebels against her former leader. Seeing Gaohm in his true form, Jera is mortally wounded and cast back down to Earth. After being found by the B-Fighters, her mask disappears, revealing her as a blonde, Caucasian woman. Before dying, she reveals how the B-Fighters could infiltrate Gaohm's ship.
- Combat-Mecha Army Commander Schwartz (戦闘メカ軍団々長シュヴァルツ, Sentō Meka Gundan Danchō Shuvarutsu): Actually a computer virus given a mechanical body, he is a maniacal android who can shoot electricity from his hands. He makes himself a special umbrella that allows him to fly, and can be used as a weapon. It was later destroyed by the B-Fighters newly acquired Pulsabers. When Jera left Jamahl and Gigaro dies, Schwartz takes on the B-Fighters on his own, adopting a new tank-like form called Schwartz Tank (シュヴァルツタンク, Shubarutsu Tanku). His body was destroyed in the process by Stagger Tank and Red Gyro's Attack Formation, though his head survived. However, the damage left Schwartz critically insane. Schwartz even tried to kill Jera, but she was saved by Black Beet. He took control of various objects on Earth (one of them being a Giant Stone Statue which was destroyed by the Mega Beet Formation) before his "immortal head" was blasted into outer space to orbit Earth.
- Synthetic Beast Army Commander Gigaro (合成獣軍団々長ギガロ, Gōseijū Gundan Danchō Gigaro): A humanoid Chimera composed of various animal parts like a blue whale-shaped flattop, clam shell-like shoulders, and a frog-like left leg. Gigaro was originally a skeletal creature on a desert planet in the Garo dimension, hunted for unknown reasons by humanoids. Exhausted and near death, Gaohm gives him a new powerful body made from an assortment of animalistic parts and recruits him into Jamahl. Gigaro uses a white bone-like sword and his flattop could open to reveal a gun. Gigaro imbued himself with life energy meant for the Jamahl to power-up into Final Gigaro (ファイナルギガロ, Fainaru Gigaro), a red and white version of himself with horns, a crab-like left arm, clam-like features, and more power. Defeated by Super Blue Beet, he was ultimately killed by Gaohm who wanted Gigaro's life energy to hasten the completion of the Jamahl Hole. Gigaro was originally supposed to be revived/absorbed by Jagul, but Mai and Kabuto's interference left Gigaro to remain dead and Jagul with a weak point on her new body.
- Sorceress Jagul (魔道士ジャグール, Madōshi Jagūru): A mysterious woman in insectoid armor that Gaohm commissioned to create an evil B-Fighter. Jagul sent a long-horned beetle to bite Takuya and take a DNA sample from him. From the beetle and Takuya's cells, Jagul created Shadow/Black Beet. She is seemingly killed by Black Beet, but resurfaces long after Jamahl was destroyed and starts kidnapping young women including Mai and Sara and resurrecting defeated monsters to battle the heroes including Synthetic Beast Gagamoth's first form and Mercenary Warrior Iluba from B-Fighter as well as Queen (Blue SWAT's enemy), Bill Goldy (Janperson's enemy), and assorted aliens that Blue SWAT had fought in their series. Jagul soon transforms into a composite-entity with eight arms, the faces of Gaohm's second form, Black Beet, and the various resurrected creatures (consisting of Synthetic Beast Bagma Virus, Mercenary Death Mult's first form, Combat Mecha-Army Death Launcher, Combat Mecha-Army Ikari-Bomber 2, Macho Number 5, Mercenary Shinigamian, Mojana, Synthetic Beast Maskuder, Hellsgyra, Jisp, Reiko Ayanokouji's Super Beast God form, and some of the aliens fought by Blue SWAT such as Zazanga and a second Bona) on her after reviving/absorbing them. She even betrays and absorbs Queen and Bill Goldy once they outlive their usefulness and their faces appeared on her. She trapped the B-Fighters, Janperson, Gun Gibson, and the Blue SWAT team in a pocket dimension, but Blue Beet escapes and hits Jagul's weak point (where Gigaro's face was supposed to go when he was revived to be absorbed by Jagul) to release the others. She was mortally wounded by the ultimate attacks of Super Blue Beet, Hyper Shou, and Janperson's Flash Cannon which regressed her to her previous form. Afterwards, she is dragged into death by Bill Goldy.
- Shadow/Black Beet (シャドー／ブラックビート, Shadō/Burakku Bīto): An evil clone of Takuya made by Jagul. Shadow is highly powerful, and by raising his Black Commander (ブラックコマンダー, Burakku Komandā) and shouting "Jakou!" (邪甲!, Jakō!, Evil Shell!), became a formidable opponent to the other B-Fighters as Black Beet, whose armor was modeled after a longhorn beetle. To prove his own existence, he tries to kill Takuya. Because he was a short‐lived clone, Shadow couldn't survive on his own and sought Saint Papilia's power to obtain immortality for himself. His weapons are a black Input Magnum known as the Jamming Magnum, and an extending hand-claw known as the Stinger Byoot. He falls because his longevity was lost though he stabs Blue Beet with his weapon. Black Beet was later revived/absorbed by Jagul in the series finale.
- Trooper Jamars (兵士ジャマー, Heishi Jamā): Faceless foot soldiers that serve Gaohm in menial tasks. Gaohm has his own Bodyguards (親衛隊, Shineitai) red versions of the Jamar that are more powerful than the normal yellow ones. The bodyguards can only be destroyed by destroying their head and can reassemble themselves as well as blast lasers from their eyes.
- Jamahl Fighters (ジャマール戦闘機, Jamāru Sentōki): Wasp-like jet fighters piloted by the Jamars, and can use their stingers as missiles.

==== Jamahl Kaijin ====
The Jamahl Kaijin (ジャマール怪人, Jamāru Kaijin) come in different armies, each led by one of the three Jamahl generals. During a fight with the B-Fighters, Gaohm would spirit all combatants into the Gaohm Zone (ガオームゾーン, Gōmu Zōn), personalized super-dimensional battlefields where the Jamahl monsters can fight to their full potential.

===== Mercenary Army =====
Led by Jera, the Mercenary Army (傭兵軍団, Yōhei Gundan) is composed of mercenary warriors from various dimensions who join Jamahl for various reasons. Some of these warriors are humans wearing armor while others are alien creatures.

- Mercenary Warrior Saberizer (傭兵戦士サーベライザ, Yōhei Senshi Sāberaiza): A skull-headed swordsman who carries a large sword and was the first of Jamahl's soldiers to be sent to Earth to enslave the humans. He is about to kill Daisuke and Rei for resisting until they become B-Fighters as Blue Beet arrives. Taken to a blade-themed Gaohm Zone, Saberizer overpowers the B-Fighters until they bring out their Stinger Weapons and Saberizer is destroyed by Blue Beet's Beetle Break.
- Mercenary Warrior Zaiking (傭兵戦士ザイキング, Yōhei Senshi Zaikingu): A cattle skull-helmeted armored warrior armed with an axe-bladed mace and shield, Zaiking joined Jera as she is the only person to defeat him in a duel. He is sent by Jera to ambush the B-Fighters while tracking down a special meteorite. Though he leaves the group due being a nature lover, Daisuke rejoins the B-Fighters when the Jamahl cause a massive forest fire to hold Blue Beet and Reddle at bay After using the B-Machines to put out the fire, the B-Fighters fight Zaiking in the Gaohm Zone before G-Stag disarms the mercenary and destroys him with Raging Slash. He is later revived for a competition, only to be destroyed by Hammer Kong.
- Mercenary Bardas (傭兵怪人バルダス, Yōhei Kaijin Barudasu): A washed-out warrior with a removable head who has long searched for the Pholon Jewel which gives whoever has it telekinetic power with a corruptive side effect. When it was found on Earth, Bardas is allowed to go and retrieve it. Though the B-Fighters interfere, Barda manages to claims the Pholon Jewel and inserts it into his head while battling the B-Fighters. However, using teamwork to shatter the Pholon Jewel, the B-Fighters easily destroy Barbas.
- Mercenary Barla (傭兵バーラ, Yōhei Bāra): A dear comrade of Jera's who once helped her in killing a monster known as the Black Dragon (ブラックドラゴン, Burakku Doragon), having his disembodied head made into a breastplate she wore since with the Black Dragon's spirit increasing her natural abilities. Barla arrives to help Jera in dealing with the B-Fighters. The two women overwhelm the B-Fighters and pursue them until the spirit of the Black Dragon reveals his true colors as he possess Barla so he can take revenge on Jera. After the B-Fighters weaken Black Dragon's hold over Barla, she stabs herself with a dagger to kill the dragon. Mortally wounded, Barla challenges Blue Beet to a duel and dies a warrior's death to Jera's horror.
- Mercenary Iluba (傭兵イルバ, Yōhei Iruba) is an armored samurai warrior that was sent to kill Mina, the last survivor of the Botania Dimension (one of the many dimensions that Jamahl had conquered). Her father sends her to Earth's dimension with the seeds of the Botania tribe, and erases her memory. The source of his power is his sword, which G-Stag destroys and finishes the weakened warrior using his Stinger Claw's Raging Slash. He is later revived and kills Death Launcher, but is killed by Sinbad. He was revived again by Jagul to fight the B-Fighters Blue SWAT, Janperson, and Gun Gibson.
- Mercenary Death Mult (傭兵デスマルト, Yōhei Desumaruto) is an armored mercenary in a bird-shaped helmet that was originally one of Jera's soldiers. He is easily defeated by Blue Beet and Reddle. After this, Jera retrieves his body and decides to bring him back to life and make him a combination of all three monster army types, now dubbed Phantom Death Mult (合体怪人デスマルト, Fantomu Desumaruto). Though he still resembles himself, his armor is now red and sports a different helmet. Gigaro provides a scorpion's tail, bird-like feet, and dragon-like arms while Schwartz added built-in shoulder cannons with one shoulder cannon being in the shape of a lobster claw and another shoulder cannon being in the shape of a dragon head as well as cybernetic dragon-like wings and smoke stack-like protrusions on his biceps. Phantom Death Mult proved able to defeat the B-Fighters until the three generals started arguing about which weapon he should use. Phantom Death Mult was stalled by the conflicting orders long enough for the B-Fighters to defeat him. He was later resurrected by Gaohm to exterminate the B-Fighters and Sinbad. This time Sinbad destroys him. Phantom Death Mult was later revived and absorbed by Jagul in the series finale where the face of his first form appeared on Destruction Goddess Jagul's body.
- Mercenary Shinigamian (傭兵シニガミアン, Yōhei Shinigamian) is a Grim Reaper-like being with skull-shaped formations on his back. He has the power to summon and control the spirits of the dead. The spirits can resist his control if they have things to accomplish on Earth. One of the ghosts raised was a young girl named Yuri who wants to fall in love before she died and thus resisted crossing over. She falls in love with Takuya and helps him fight Shinigamian by helping the other ghosts realize they are just being used. Once Shinigamian was dead, the ghosts are free to return to the afterlife. Yuri follows this time, having fallen in love with Takuya and thus finishing her business. He was later revived and absorbed by Jagul in the series finale.
- Mercenary Hidra (傭兵ヒドラ, Yōhei Hidora) is nicknamed the Spider of Flame due to her spider-themed armor. In battle, Hidra could blast fire and smoke from her mouth as well as send out web threads to wrap/bind her enemies. She was assigned the job of capturing Guru so Gaohm could use him to gather the energy of the insects on the planet to complete the Jamahl Hole. Gaohm, secretly promises Hidra that she could take Jera's place, if she succeeded, which she did. Gaohm gives her an armband as proof of her new rank. However, the armband is actually a bomb. Despite Jera's learning of this and warning Hidra, Hidra explodes and dies but not before telling the B-Fighters to kill Gaohm for her.

===== Synthetic Beast Army =====
Led by Gigaro, the Synthetic Beast Army (合成獣軍団, Gōseijū Gundan) is composed of humanoid Chimeras created from Gigaro's blood.

- Synthetic Beast Heavyznake (合成獣ヘビーズネーク, Gōseijū Hebīzunēku): A reptilian humanoid snake monster with a long snake draped over the head area that serves as his arms, he is the first of the Synthetic Beasts to be summoned when Gaohm had the remaining humans that Saberiza abducted converted into his slaves via the Jamahl Melody. Using the brain-washed humans, Heavyznake puts the B-Fighters at a disadvantage until they sneak into their base and destroy the source of the Jamahl Melody. With the plan a failure, the Heavyznake battles the B-Fighters before the barrier is destroyed. Taking the fight to the Gaohm Zone, Heavyznake's snake is blasted off to reveal his true snake-like head and true arms while using the dimension to his advantage. Weakened by the B-Weapons, Heavysnake is destroyed by Blue Beet's Beetle Break.
- Synthetic Beast Bagma Virus (合成獣バグマビルス, Gōseijū Bagumabirusu): A gnat-like monster created by Gigaro, able to shrink himself to microscopic size and infiltrate any one's body to take control. He is sent by Gigaro to infect the B-Fighters' Insect Armor, asexually reproducing himself to enter G-Stag and Reddle. Using the two B-Fighters, Bagma planned to use them to attack a plasma plant and cause a meltdown. Realizing Bagma cannot thrive in freezing temperatures, Blue Beet uses this to force the monster out of his frozen allies before thawing them out. However, an offshoot of Bagma possesses Hikari and uses her to install a bomb. But when Bagma Virus is destroyed by Beetle Break, his extension in Hikari was destroyed as Mukai disarms the bomb in time. Bagma Virus is later revived and killed by Sinbad. He was revived a second time and absorbed by Jagul in the series finale.
- Synthetic Beast Garinezu (合成獣ガリネーズ, Gōseijū Garinēzu): A hunchbacked gray-furred four-eyed rat monster that Gigaro created who is able to roll up into a ball. He is sent to gnaw through underground power cables and cause mass panic. However, Garinezu has Ailurophobia so severe that he runs from a fight at the sight of a cat. To solve the issue, Gigaro forces Garinezu to run a hundred times through a maze with Jamar soldiers holding kidnapped cats at every corner. Cured of his phobia, Garinezu resumes his mission before the B-Fighters find him. Taking the fight to the Gaohm Zone, Garinezu is destroyed by Beetle Break. Later revived, but dies in a suicide attempt to kill Blue Beet.
- Hellsgyra (ヘルズガイラ, Heruzugaira; Movie) is an unspecified monster whose body is covered in bony plates. He can control the bones strewn around his island, extending them and using them to capture the B-Fighters. Hellsgyra is beaten by the combined powers and strength of Drago and Blue Beet. He was revived and absorbed by Jagul in the series finale.
- Synthetic Beast Namakeruge (合成獣ナマケルゲ, Gōseijū Namakeruge): A horned sloth monster who is extremely lazy much to Gigaro's dismay. Gigaro attempted to kill his creation until he was convinced by Gaohm to have the Synthetic Beast pose as a bus driver and use his tongue to suck the energy out of people to become active while they became lazy. Though he takes the energy of the male B-Fighters, the Insects restore their drive as they come to Reddle's aid. Unable to take the infinite energy now powering them, Namakeruge is destroyed by Beetle Break. Later revived, he dies in a suicide attempt to kill Blue Beet.
- Synthetic Beast Bububu (合成獣ブーブーブー, Gōseijū Būbūbū) is a pig monster with big ears and broken tusks who can breathe a white gas that steals human voices, reducing them to grunts and squeals. He can breathe fire and blast lasers from his tusks. Reddle finishes him off with the Stinger Plasmar. Later revived, he dies in a suicide attempt to kill Blue Beet.
- Synthetic Beast Kamazakiller (合成獣カマザキラー, Gōseijū Kamazakirā) is a mantis monster whose mission is to spread her eggs throughout the city, injecting them into people using her long, spiked tongue. The eggs would then grow inside their hosts. Kamazakiller is killed by Blue Beet's new weapon, the Stinger Drill, using the Strike Blast. She is later revived only to be killed by G-Stag with help from Sinbad.
- Synthetic Beast Ebiganya (合成獣エビガーニャ, Gōseijū Ebigānya) is a red-shelled crab/shrimp combination monster with four arms who emits a liquid that turns ordinary water into poison. He could deflect shots from his shelled armor as well as blast water as strong pulses. After Daisaku's father tries to stop him from polluting the water, Ebigaanya sets him adrift with a bomb in his boat. Daisaku overcomes his fear of the water and saves his father, and returns to battle Shrimpcrabya. He is killed by a hot water blast from the Input Magnums, which cook him and incapacitate him. G-Stag finishes him with the Raging Slash.
- Synthetic Beast Maskuder (合成獣マスクーダー, Gōseijū Masukūdā) is an amoeba monster who wears a gold mask with rows of faces surround it while nested on each other, extending in a star-like pattern. Maskuder disguises himself as a plastic surgeon able to make anyone beautiful with his special masks. The masks give his customers the face of the famous model Mizuzu Shiratori, who happens to be a childhood friend of Mai's. These masks, however, are explosive control devices that let Maskuder control the wearers and detonate them when he breaks his own mask, which is his central gold face. Under the gold mask is a single eye. Maskuder can also cause explosions on command. He was later revived and absorbed by Jagul in the series finale.
- The Moja (モジャ, Moja) is an other-dimensional creature. Gigaro gave several Mojas to several children in the guise of a salesman. He told the children that if the creatures acted up, to hit them with a special stick. The stick actually causes the Moja to become fierce creatures that absorb the consciousness of the one who hits them. The creatures eventually gather and transform into the moth-headed monster Mojanga (モジャンガ). Mojanga can breathe fire. The children's consciousness is trapped inside Mojanga. Though the children try to urge the B-Fighters to fight, Mojanga can reverse what the consciousnesses trapped inside him said. Eventually, Daisaku went inside Mojanga's body and freed the children. He was later revived and absorbed by Jagul in the series finale.
- Synthetic Beast Gagamoth (合成獣ガガモス, Gōseijū Gagamosu) is at first an energy-sucking caterpillar monster, but it metamorphoses into a red moth monster when it absorbs the Beet Ingram's power. In this form, its right and left arms end transform into duplicates of the Input Magnum and Stinger Blade respectively. It was the first to be destroyed by the newly born Super Blue Beet. Gagamoth could also flap its wings and release destructive pollen. Gagamoth's caterpillar form is later revived by Jagul to fight the B-Fighters, Blue SWAT, Janperson, and Gun Gibson.
- Synthetic Beast Rasbelga (合成獣ラズベルガ, Gōseijū Razuberuga) is a monster created from the fictional "Rasbel" flower, a carnivorous plant that can move on its own and feeds on small animals. Although almost invincible, Rasbelga's only weakness is the fruit of a tree discovered by Sayuri, an old girlfriend of Mukai's, which makes him spit out the people he swallows & disables his pollen spray so he can be defeated. Aside from spraying destructive pollen, it can launch vines from its mouth and strangle enemies. Mukai tries to stop Rasbelga, by wearing bulky armor, calling himself "Mukaider K-3", though the armor gradually falls apart as he fights. Despite this, Mukai's actions enable Blue Beet to help G-Stag and Reddle, who are stuck within Rasbelga's stomach, to break free and finish the monster with Blue Beet's Stinger Drill.
- Figer (火炎獣ファイガ, Kaen-jū Faiga) is a legendary fire-breathing cat monster that is fossilized and unable to move. Gigaro has Schwartz use a youth-restoring machine to bring back Figer, but Schwartz sets it too high and the edition of Faigar that appears is a child who breathes fire towards anyone around him including Gigaro. While trying to stop it, Blue Beet tackles Figer and is hit by the residual youth energy that is in it, turning Takuya into a child. Gigaro and Schwartz eventually recapture Figer with candy so they can place him back into the machine to age him to a more dangerous age. They overdo it and the Figer that emerges is blackened and burnt. Blue Beet uses this chance to restore his own age, then destroys Figer with the Super Final Blow.
- Synthetic Beast Giga-Tsukinowa (合成獣ギガツキノワ, Gōseijū Giga Tsukinowa) is the spirit of an Asian black bear who is hunted and killed in the mountains by humans. Feeling a bond, Gigaro rekindles Giga-Tsukinowa's hatred of humans and revives the bear as a bloodthirsty monster whom Gigaro used for his "B-Fighter Hunt". Giga-Tsukinowa captures a young friend of Mai, though it appears to show compassion upon seeing a teddy bear that the young girl has with her. Eventually defeated by the B-Fighters.

===== Combat-Mecha Army =====
Led by Schwartz, the Combat-Mecha Army (戦闘メカ軍団, Sentō Meka Gundan) is composed of combat robots.

- Combat-Mecha Army Hammer Kong (戦闘メカ軍団ハンマコング, Sentō Meka Gundan Hanma Kongu): A silver and gold robot with giant hammers on his hands and a head in the shape of a hammer head with the striking surface being his face that has one eye. He can pound his hands on the ground to create Hammer Crush shock waves, or toss them in his Hammer Boomerang attack while firing a "Kong Beam" from his single eye & spit giant nails to pin his enemies to a wall. He is uses in Schwartz's scheme to force the B-Fighters into submission by holding children hostage. After saving the children, the B-Fighter battle Hammer Kong in the Gahom Zone before they take out the Combat-Robot's visual sensors and destroys him with a Beetle Break/Tornado Spark combo. Hammer Kong is later rebuilt and dies in a suicide attempt on Reddle.
- Combat-Mecha Army Death Launcher (戦闘メカ軍団デスランチャー, Sentō Meka Gundan Desu Ranchā): A green robot with missile launchers on his shoulders and gun batteries on his wrists, used by Schwartz as an enforcer in a scheme to use the Jamahl Wave machine to turn all machines against humans, including the B-Machines. Luckily for the B-Fighters, their B-Commanders cannot be controlled as they don their Insect Armor to fight Death Launcher. After Blue Beet destroys the Jamahl Wave machine, he uses his Beetle Break to destroy Death Launcher. Later rebuilt in episode 30, only to be destroyed again by Iluba. He was later revived and absorbed by Jagul in the series finale.
- Combat-Mecha Gamerio (戦闘メカガメリオ, Sentō Meka Gamerio): A camera-based robot with flashbulb eyes, Gamerio disguises himself as a photographer and goes around taking pictures of people with an instant camera. Those who got their pictures taken, are eventually spirited off into another dimension to work at a Jamahl slave quarry. Among his targets is Rei, unaware that she was a B-Fighter. However, Rei learns that Gamerio's transport system can be disrupted by high-frequency sound waves and uses a dog whistle to disrupt the Combat Robot's systems and teleport the children back to Earth. Taking the fight to the Gaohm Zone, Gamerio converts into full-on battle mode before being destroyed by Beetle Break. He was later rebuilt, but Reddle destroys him.
- Combat-Mecha Ikari-Bomber (戦闘メカイカリボンバ, Sentō Meka Ikaribonba): A prideful and arrogant hand grenade-based robot with a short-fused temper who detonates whenever someone makes him mad, causing an explosion of tremendous power before reforming himself. Sent to Aoyama City, Ikari-Bomber holds the city hostage and force them into slavery in the renamed Jamahl City. After learning the best way to defeat Ikari-Bomber is to take out the detonation/reconstruction chip in his head module, the B-Fighters set up a scheme to take out the chip with the experimental EIG ray gun while Daisaku distracts Ikari Bomber. Once the plan succeeds, the B-Fighters use the Red Gyro to carry Ikari-Bomber away from the city so he can be safely blown up by the Beetluder and Stagger Tank's guns. He is eventually rebuilt as Combat-Mecha Ikari-Bomber 2 (戦闘メカイカリボンバ2, Sentō Meka Ikaribonba Tsū), with a new orange-colored body and slightly different head. However, during a battle at a junkyard, Ikari-Bomber 2 accidentally incorporated a hair clipper into his body, grafting onto his left hand. Overcome by the hair clipper's desire to cut hair and to grudge on those who had discarded it when it was still usable, Ikari-Bomber 2 goes on a head-shaving spree until the B-Fighters destroyed his component pieces one by one. Ikari-Bomber 2 was rebuilt in Episode 30, but was destroyed off-screen. He was revived yet again as Ikari-Bomber 2 and absorbed by Jagul in the series finale.
- Combat-Mecha Gagamirror (戦闘メカガガミラー, Sentō Meka Gagamirā) is a white robot with a dome-like head and a rounded chest that can open up into a large mirror, and anyone whose reflection he captures in the mirror could be trapped inside, allowing Gagamirror to assume their shape. He sucks Takuya into his mirror and disguised as Takuya, he infiltrates the Juukou Base. Rei penetrates the deception when Gagamirror steps on flowers as he took a young boy who Takuya knew to see the Beet Machines (earlier, Takuya had swerved and crashed the Beetluder to avoid hitting some flowers). He was killed by the Beetle Break.
- Combat-Mecha Dangar (戦闘メカダンガー, Sentō Meka Dangā) is a blue robot with red circles on his chest, elbows, and shoulders, and black spikes on his arms, legs, and head. Dangar's mission is to eliminate the escapee Lala, who had been forced to help build the Death Gaohm, a super-cannon that could destroy an entire country in one blast. Lala is actually a scientist from the Aroa dimension and although she falls in love with Takuya, she returns home after Dangar and the Death Gaohm are destroyed. Later was revived, but killed by G-Stag.
- Macho No. 5 (マッチョNO5, Matcho Nanbā Faibu) is Schwartz's older brother, though Schwartz actually built him with his own two mechanical hands. He is muscular with blue and white armor plating and a face/faceplate like Schwartz's. He is injured in a battle with the B-Fighters. Mostly to save him, Schwartz enters Macho's head to pilot him personally. Macho's final plan to rid them of the B-Fighters is to destroy himself. He tells Schwartz to leave his body, but his brother refused. Seconds before his death, at the hands of Super Blue Beet, Macho ejects Schwartz to save him. The only remains Schwartz found later is Macho's eyepiece which he takes as a memento. He vows to defeat the B-Fighters for his brother. Macho No.5 was later revived and absorbed by Jagul in the series finale.

=== Returning villains ===
- Mademoiselle Q/Queen (マドモアゼル・Q/クイーン, Madomoazeru Kyū/Kuīn) is an old enemy of Blue SWAT with a bird-like monster form who is a member of the Space Mafia. She was revived in the series finale by Sorceress Jagul to fight the B-Fighters, Blue SWAT, Janperson, and Gun Gibson. Queen was later absorbed into Jagul.
- Ryuzaburo Tatewaki/Bill Goldy (帯刀龍三郎/ビルゴルディ, Tatewaki Ryuzaburō/Birugorudi) is an old enemy of Janperson and Gun Gibson. He was revived by Sorceress Jagul to the fight the B-Fighters, Blue SWAT, Janperson and Gun Gibson. He was later absorbed into Jagul. After Jagul's Destruction God form was defeated, Bill Goldy dragged Jagul to her demise.
- The Bona (ボナ, Bona) were alien foot soldiers for the Space Mafia. One Bona was revived by Sorceress Jagul to fight the B-Fighters, Blue SWAT, Janperson, and Gun Gibson. A Bona was later absorbed into Jagul.
- The Kell (ケル, Keru) were alien foot soldiers for the Space Mafia. One Kell was revived by Sorceress Jagul to fight the B-Fighters, Blue SWAT, Janperson, and Gun Gibson.

== Episodes ==
1. Insect Warriors!! (昆虫戦士だ！！, Konchū Senshi da!!): written by Junichi Miyashita, directed by Shinichiro Sawai
2. The Dancing Human Hunt!! (踊る人間狩り！！, Odoru Ningen Gari!!): written by Junichi Miyashita, directed by Shinichiro Sawai
3. They Appeared, the Insect Mecha!! (出た 昆虫メカ！！, Deta Konchū Meka!!): written by Junichi Miyashita, directed by Kaneharu Mitsumura
4. Super Machine Great Riot (超マシン大暴れ, Chō Mashin Ōabare): written by Junichi Miyashita, directed by Kaneharu Mitsumura
5. Juukou Jack!! (重甲ジャック！！, Jūkō Jakku!!): written by Junichi Miyashita, directed by Taro Sakamoto
6. Listen to the Forest's Cry (森の叫びを聞け, Mori no Sakebi o Kike): written by Nobuo Ogizawa, directed by Taro Sakamoto
7. The Mysterious Master Photographer!! (謎の激写マン！！, Nazo no Gekisha Man): written by Kyoko Sagiyama, directed by Hidenori Ishida
8. Please!! Evil Jewel (お願い!! 魔法石, Onegai!! Mahōseki): written by Akira Asaka, directed by Hidenori Ishida
9. The Tabby-Cat Recovery Operation (トラ猫奪回作戦, Toraneko Dakkai Sakusen): written by Nobuo Ogizawa, directed by Hidenori Ishida
10. A Violent Fight!! The Dragon Swordsman (激闘！！竜の剣士, Gekitō!! Ryū no Kenshi): written by Akira Asaka, directed by Kaneharu Mitsumura
11. The Great Reckless Run of the Angry Robo (怒りロボ大暴走, Ikari Robo Daibōsō): written by Yasuko Kobayashi, directed by Kaneharu Mitsumura
12. Stealing Motivation!! (やる気を奪え！！, Yaruki o Ubae!!): written by Nobuo Ogizawa, directed by Taro Sakamoto
13. The Juukou Base Endangered! (危うし重甲基地, Ayaushi Jūkō Kichi): written by Junichi Miyashita, directed by Taro Sakamoto
14. The Maze of Deadly Hell (必殺地獄の迷宮, Hissatsu Jigoku no Meikyū): written by Junichi Miyashita, directed by Katsuya Watanabe
15. The Idol who Flew (翔んだアイドル, Tonda Aidoru): written by Nobuo Ogizawa, directed by Katsuya Watanabe
16. The Flaming Super-dimensional Girl (炎の超次元少女, Honō no Chōjigen Shōjo): written by Kyoko Sagiyama, directed by Kaneharu Mitsumura
17. Death Fight!! The Combined Monster (死闘！！合体怪人, Shitō!! Gattai Kaijin): written by Nobuo Ogizawa, directed by Kaneharu Mitsumura
18. The Great Leader Dies!! (大首領死す！！, Daishuryō Shisu!!): written by Akira Asaka, directed by Osamu Kaneda
19. Birth of the New Warrior of Darkness (誕生闇の新戦士, Tanjō Yami no Shin Senshi): written by Junichi Miyashita, directed by Osamu Kaneda
20. Crash!! The Black Terror (激突！！黒の恐怖, Gekitotsu!! Kuro no Kyōfu): written by Junichi Miyashita, directed by Taro Sakamoto
21. Atrocious Insect Tag (極悪昆虫タッグ, Gokuaku Konchū Taggu): written by Nobuo Ogizawa, directed by Taro Sakamoto
22. First Experience as a Heroine (ヒロイン初体験, Hiroin Hatsutaiken): written by Junichi Miyashita, directed by Kaneharu Mitsumura
23. A Bouquet for a Monster... (怪人に花束を・・・, Kaijin ni Hanataba o...): written by Nobuo Ogizawa, directed by Kaneharu Mitsumura
24. Enter the Giant Beetle (登場巨大カブト, Tōjō Kyodai Kabuto): written by Junichi Miyashita, directed by Hidenori Ishida
25. The Beautiful Runaway!! (美しき逃亡者！！, Utsukushiki Tōbōsha!!): written by Kyoko Sagiyama, directed by Hidenori Ishida
26. Crabs and Swimsuits and Dad (蟹と水着と親父, Kani to Mizugi to Oyaji): written by Akira Asaka, directed by Taro Sakamoto
27. Revive the Bad-Haircutting Soul (甦るトラ刈り魂, Yomigaeru Tora Gari Damashii): written by Nobuo Ogizawa, directed by Taro Sakamoto
28. The Pure-hearted Ghost of Summer (真夏の純情幽霊, Manatsu no Junjō Yūrei): written by Junichi Miyashita, directed by Osamu Kaneda
29. Great Crash of the Rivals (ライバル大激突, Raibaru Daigekitotsu): written by Junichi Miyashita, directed by Osamu Kaneda
30. The 13 Monsters Great Combat Meet (１３怪人大武闘会, Jūsan Kaijin Daibutōkai): written by Akira Asaka, directed by Kaneharu Mitsumura
31. A Dangerous Young Lady (危ないお嬢さま, Abunai Ojōsama): written by Akira Asaka, directed by Kaneharu Mitsumura
32. Loving Pickles!! (恋する漬け物！！, Koi suru Tsukemono!!): written by Nobuo Ogizawa, directed by Katsuya Watanabe
33. The Delinquent Girl of Justice (正義の非行少女, Seigi no Hikō Shōjo): written by Junichi Miyashita, directed by Katsuya Watanabe
34. A Scaaary Pet (コワ～いペット, Kowāi Petto): written by Kyoko Sagiyama, directed by Taro Sakamoto
35. Thank You, Kabuto-kun (カブト君まいど, Kabutokun Maido): written by Junichi Miyashita, directed by Taro Sakamoto
36. See the Juukou Super Evolution (見よ重甲超進化, Miyo Jūkō Chōshinka): written by Junichi Miyashita, directed by Taro Sakamoto
37. Don't Swindle Us, Bodyguard (サギるな用心棒, Sagiruna Yōjinbō): written by Nobuo Ogizawa, directed by Kaneharu Mitsumura
38. Professor!! The Juukou of Love (博士！！愛の重甲, Hakase!! Ai no Jūkō): written by Akira Asaka, directed by Kaneharu Mitsumura
39. The B-Fighter Boy's Adventure (少年ＢＦ(ビーファイター)の冒険, Sōnen Bī Faitā no Bōken): written by Kyoko Sagiyama, directed by Osamu Kaneda
40. A New Chapter: The Butterfly of Life (新章・生命(いのち)の蝶, Shinshō Inochi no Chō): written by Junichi Miyashita, directed by Osamu Kaneda
41. My Older Brother is Buff (兄貴はムキムキ, Aniki wa Mukimuki): written by Nobuo Ogizawa, directed by Hidenori Ishida
42. The Spiteful Bear's B-Fighter Hunt (恨み熊ＢＦ(ビーファイター)狩り, Uramiguma Bī Faitā Gari): written by Kyoko Sagiyama, directed by Hidenori Ishida
43. I Saw It!! Black's Unadorned Face (見た！！黒(ブラック)の素顔, Mita!! Burakku no Sugao): written by Junichi Miyashita, directed by Taro Sakamoto
44. The Butterfly of Life Appears!! (生命(いのち)の蝶現る！！, Inochi no Chō Arawaru!!): written by Junichi Miyashita, directed by Taro Sakamoto
45. A Christmas Eve Memory (聖夜のメモリー, Seiya no Memorī): written by Akira Asaka, directed by Kaneharu Mitsumura
46. Despair!! Juukou Impossible (絶望！！重甲不能, Zetsubō!! Jūkō Funō): written by Nobuo Ogizawa, directed by Katsuya Watanabe
47. Revival to Victory!! (勝利への復活！！, Shōri e no Fukkatsu!!): written by Nobuo Ogizawa, directed by Katsuya Watanabe
48. The Immortal Combination Rushing Head (不滅合体走る首, Fumetsu Gattai Hashiru Kubi): written by Nobuo Ogizawa, directed by Kaneharu Mitsumura
49. The Spider Woman's Unfeeling Flame (クモ女非情の炎, Kumo Onna Hijō no Honō): written by Junichi Miyashita, directed by Taro Sakamoto
50. Rush!! Final Battle in the Fortress (突入！！要塞決戦, Totsunyū!! Yōsai Kessen): written by Junichi Miyashita, directed by Taro Sakamoto
51. The Period of Light and Shadow (光と影の終止符(ピリオド), Hikari to Kage no Piriodo): written by Junichi Miyashita, directed by Taro Sakamoto
52. Assemble!! The 3 Great Heroes (集結！！３大英雄(ヒーロー), Shūketsu!! Sandai Hīrō): written by Yasuko Kobayashi, directed by Kaneharu Mitsumura
53. Flap Your Wings!! Heroes (翔け！！英雄(ヒーロー)達, Habatake!! Hīrō-tachi): written by Yasuko Kobayashi, directed by Kaneharu Mitsumura

== Related media ==
=== Theatrical films ===
- Juukou B-Fighter: The Movie
- Kamen Rider × Super Sentai × Space Sheriff: Super Hero Taisen Z
- Space Squad

== Film ==
- Juukou B-Fighter (04/15/95)
  - Script: Junichi Miyashita
  - Director: Osamu Kaneda

== Cast ==
- Takuya Kai: Daisuke Tsuchiya (土屋 大輔, Tsuchiya Daisuke)
- Daisaku Katagiri: Shigeru Kanai (金井 茂, Kanai Shigeru)
- Rei Hayama: Reina Hazuki (葉月 レイナ, Hazuki Reina)
- Mai Takatori: Chigusa Tomoe (巴 千草, Tomoe Chigusa)
- Kenzo Mukai: Takashi Sasano (笹野 高史, Sasano Takashi)
- Shadow: Keisuke Tsuchiya (土屋 圭輔, Tsuchiya Keisuke)
- Jera/Gira: Yuko Ito (伊藤 祐子, Itō Yūko; 14, 33, 46-50), Shelley Sweeney (50)

=== Voice cast ===
- Rei Hayama: Maho Maruyama (丸山 真穂, Maruyama Maho)
- Sage Guru: Yasuo Tanaka (田中 康郎, Tanaka Yasuo)
- Kabuto: Takahiro Yoshimizu (吉水 孝宏, Yoshimizu Takahiro)
- Gaohm: Takeshi Watabe (渡部 猛, Watabe Takeshi)
- Gigaro: Toshimichi Takahashi
- Schwartz: Shigeru Chiba (千葉 繁, Chiba Shigeru)
- Jera: Keiko Konno (金野 恵子, Konno Keiko)
- Jagul: Hisako Kyoda (京田 尚子, Kyōda Hisako)
- Black Beet: Shunsuke Sakuya (咲野 俊介, Sakuya Shunsuke)
- Saint Papilia: Amina Tominaga (富永 アミナ, Tominaga Amina)
- Narrator, Mega Herakles: Minoru Inaba (稲葉 実, Inaba Minoru)

=== Guest cast ===
- Haruka (1–2, 43–44): Chizu Momochi
- Haruka's mother (1–2): Fusaku Kenmotsu
- Show Narumi (52–53): Souji Masaki (正木 蒼二, Masaki Sōji)
- Sara Misugi (52–53): Yuka Shiratori (白鳥 夕香, Shiratori Yuka)
- Sig (52–53): Kou Domon (土門 廣, Domon Kō)
- Ryuzaburo Tatewaki (52–53): Shun Sugata (菅田 俊, Sugata Shun)
- Queen (52–53): Miyuki Nagato (長門美 由樹, Nagato Miyuki)
- Janperson (52–53): Yuichi Komine (小峰 裕, Komine Yūichi)
- Gun Gibson (52–53): Rintaro Tori (鳥井 林太朗, Torī Rintarō)

== Songs ==
Opening theme

- "Jūkō B-Fighter" (重甲ビーファイター, Jūkō Bīfaitā)
  - Lyrics: Yoko Aki (阿木 燿子, Aki Yōko)
  - Composition: Ryudo Uzaki (宇崎 竜童, Uzaki Ryūdō)
  - Arrangement: Katsunori Ishida (石田 勝範, Ishida Katsunori)
  - Artist: Shinichi Ishihara (石原 慎一, Ishihara Shin'ichi)

Ending theme

- "Chikyū Kōkō" (地球孝行; "Earth Dutiful")
  - Lyrics: Yoko Aki
  - Composition: Ryudo Uzaki
  - Arrangement: Katsunori Ishida
  - Artist: Shinichi Ishihara

== International Broadcasting and Home Video ==
- In its home country of Japan, the series was released on Sale and Rental VHS by Toei Video from February 1996 to February 1997 in full with all episodes spread throughout 13 volumes. Each volume contains four episodes, while the final volume contained five episodes. Then in 2006 from June 21 to October 21, Toei Video then released the series on DVD for the first time spread through five volumes and each holding two discs. The first two DVD volumes contain 10 episodes, while the rest contain 11 episodes.
- In Thailand, TIGA Company licensed the series for VCD distribution under Iron Armor B-fighter. (กรบเกราะเหล็ก บี-ไฟท์เตอร์)
- In the Philippines, despite the American-produced Big Bad Bettleborgs aired on GMA Network in 1997, it was aired on RPN under the title of Beetle Fighters in 1999 with Tagalog dub.
