= Big Bang Love, Juvenile A =

2006 film by Takashi Miike

- Directed by: Takashi Miike
- Written by: Masa Nakamura
- Produced by: Shiro Sasaki; Takeshi Watanabe
- Cinematography: Masahito Kaneko
- Release dates: February 2006 (Berlin); August 26, 2006 (Japan)
- Running time: 85 minutes
- Country: Japan
- Language: Japanese

Big Bang Love, Juvenile A (46億年の恋, 46-okunen no koi; lit. "4.6-Billion-Year Love") is a 2006 film directed by Takashi Miike. The film premiered at the 56th Berlin International Film Festival in February 2006.

== Plot ==
In an unknown future, Jun confesses to the murder of another boy, Shiro, at an all-boy juvenile detention facility. The story follows two detectives trying to uncover the case through interviews and intersperses testimonies by the inmates and the prison employees with events in the lives of Jun and Shiro. Jun, who is incarcerated for the murder of his rapist, forms an intensely close bond with Shiro, who is in prison for a murder and the rape of a woman. Shiro protects Jun with fanatical intensity and violence from the other boys, though his intentions toward Jun are not clear.

== Cast ==
- Ryuhei Matsuda as Jun
- Masanobu Andō as Shiro
- Shunsuke Kubozuka
- Kiyohiko Shibukawa
- Jo Kanamori
- Kenichi Endō
- Renji Ishibashi
- Ryo Ishibashi
- Shirō Kazuki
- Jai West
