= The Great Horror Family =

Japanese television series

The Great Horror Family (怪奇大家族, Kaiki daikazoku) is a 2004 Japanese horror comedy television series directed by Kenji Murakami, Takashi Shimizu, Keisuke Toyoshima and Yūdai Yamaguchi, which aired on TV Tokyo affiliated stations.

== Episodes ==
- Season 1, Episode 1: The Horror! The Cursed Imawano Family, 3 October 2004.
- Season 1, Episode 2: The Horror! The World Osamu Doesn't Know About, 10 October 2004.
- Season 1, Episode 3: Horrifying! Kiwa's Tea Drinking Friend, 17 October 2004.
- Season 1, Episode 4: The Horror! The Cursed Portrait, 24 October 2004.
- Season 1, Episode 5: The Horror! The Alien You Prefer, 31 October 2004.
- Season 1, Episode 6: Ghost Story! Red Light Spirit Tsuyako, 7 November 2004.
- Season 1, Episode 7: Grotesque! The Cursed Gothic Lolita, 14 November 2004.
- Season 1, Episode 8: True Story! Afterlife of Honor, 21 November 2004.
- Season 1, Episode 9: Escape! The Imawano Family and the Cursed Maze, 28 November 2004.
- Season 1, Episode 10: The Horror! Kiyoshi's Cursed Countdown, 5 December 2004.
- Season 1, Episode 11: Extreme! Kiyoshi's Family and the World Over There, 12 December 2004.
- Season 1, Episode 12: Bizarre! ...the original Great Family, 19 December 2004.
- Season 1, Episode 13: A Bizarre! ...and Great Family, 26 December 2004.

== Cast ==
- Shunji Fujimura - Fuchio Imawano
- Issei Takahashi - Kiyoshi Imawano
- Tomiko Ishii - Kiwa Imawano
- Shigeru Muroi - Yuko Imawano
- Nao Oikawa - Sexy Woman
- Asuka Shibuya - Kyoko Imawano
- Jai West - Tonaka Kyoojoorou

== Staff ==
- Producers - Hinji Imamura, Richard Kekahuna (English adaptation), Nobuo Masuda (English adaptation), Tatsuya Yamaga.
- Executive producers - Ken Iyadomi (English adaptation), Akira Kanbe, Yo Umezaki.
