= Chamaeleo caroliquarti =

Chamaeleo caroliquarti Temporal range: Lower Miocene, 26 Ma

Scientific classification
- Kingdom: Animalia
- Phylum: Chordata
- Class: Reptilia
- Order: Squamata
- Suborder: Iguania
- Family: Chamaeleonidae
- Genus: Chamaeleo
- Species: C. caroliquarti

Binomial name
- Chamaeleo caroliquarti Moody & Rocek, 1980

Extinct species of lizard

Chamaeleo caroliquarti is an extinct species of chameleon from Lower Miocene-aged strata of the Czech Republic (discovered in the Dolnice suburb of Cheb in western Czech Republic). C. caroliquarti is perhaps the oldest known representative of the genus Chamaeleo, and, if the middle Paleocene-aged Anqingosaurus is not a chameleon, the oldest known chameleon.
