= Reika Hashimoto =

Japanese actress and model

Reika Hashimoto (橋本麗香, Hashimoto Reika; born December 25, 1980 in Tokyo) is a Japanese model and actress. She is of Japanese-Spanish heritage. Her father is an American citizen of Spanish descent. She has been working as a model since she was 10, and her acting debut was in the 1999 movie Hakuchi (directed by Makoto Tezuka, opposite Tadanobu Asano), and has performed in several movies. On television, she had a participation on TV Asahi's Profile and has performed in Chinese soap operas.

== Filmography ==
Film:

- Hakuchi (The Innocent) (1999)
- Jikken Eiga (1999)
- Mōju vs Issunbōshi (2001)
- Hero? Tenshi ni Aeba... (Hero? If I Could Meet an Angel...) (2004)
- Survive Style 5+ (2004)
- Black Kiss (2006)

Television:

- Mokuyō no aidan (Thursday's Ghost Tales) (Fuji Television (Japan), 1996)
- Ren ren dou shuo wo ai ni (人人都说我爱你) (China, 2003)
- Jiang shan mei ren (江山美人) (China, 2004)
- Trail of the Everlasting Hero (侠影仙踪) (China, 2004)
- B-Fighter Kabuto as Sophie Villeneuve/B-Fighter Ageha, (Toei, 1996)
- Wonderful (TBS, 1996)
- PRO－file (TV-Asahi, until 2004)
