= Good Morning, Sleeping Lion =

- Kanji: グッドモーニング、眠れる獅子
- Revised Hepburn: Guddomōningu, Nemureru Shishi
- Directed by: Koichi Sakamoto
- Written by: Yoshiyuki Mitsumasu
- Produced by: Hideaki Tsukada; Masayuki Meguro
- Starring: Seiji Takaiwa; Miho Watanabe
- Production companies: I-Cast; Toei Video; Toei Channel
- Distributed by: Hikari TV
- Release date: April 23, 2022 (Hikari TV Channel)
- Running time: 86 minutes
- Country: Japan
- Language: Japanese

Good Morning, Sleeping Lion (Japanese: グッドモーニング、眠れる獅子, Hepburn: Guddomōningu, Nemureru Shishi) is a 2022 web film, starring Seiji Takaiwa and Miho Watanabe and directed by Koichi Sakamoto. It was released on Hikari TV Channel on April 23, 2022. The film is the first starring role of Takaiwa, best known for his work as the suit actor for the Kamen Rider and Super Sentai series. Several previous Kamen Rider lead actors also appear as main antagonists.

== Plot ==
Remi Watanuki is an unpopular Japanese idol who aspires to become an actress. However, the childhood trauma of being abandoned by her father has made her unable to cry, instead resorting to laughter as a defense mechanism, which severely limits her acting range. Unbeknownst to her, her father Tsukasa was actually a mercenary and has died in an unnamed war. Her manager, Kazuma Kujo, fought alongside Tsukasa in the war and was asked by him in his final moments to give her his bracelet as a keepsake and to help her achieve her dream. Kujo blackmails a film producer into inviting her to an audition for a role in a famed director's upcoming film. Despite her condition, Remi passes the early stages of the audition.

One day, Remi is harassed by several thugs. Kujo comes to her aid wearing a Kamen Rider mask to conceal his identity, and a young man named Ryosuke helps her escape. Kujo learns from his friend Charlie, a fellow former mercenary who now runs a pub, that they are members of a gang called Grim Reapers, a group of adrenaline junkies who seek thrills primarily through violence. The day before the final audition, Remi becomes frustrated about her condition and gets into an argument with Kujo in front of the event hall where she holds her live shows. Ryosuke appears, claiming to have wanted to watch her show, and persuades Remi to go somewhere with him. It turns out that Ryosuke is actually a leader of Grim Reapers nicknamed "Heart" and he takes Remi to their hideout to present to his brother "Spade" Naoto, her fan who has been banned from her shows due to his stalking behavior. Remi is then restrained at the hideout.

On the final audition day, Kujo learns of Ryosuke's true identity from Charlie and invades the office of a yakuza group at war with the Grim Reapers in order to find out their hideout location. After being cornered by the yakuza's strongest fighter, Kujo awakens his dormant full fighting power and manages to defeat the thugs and get the hideout location from the yakuza leader. He assaults the hideout and incapacitates Spade, and knowing that they would not make it back in time for the audition, sets up the equipment for a remote audition. Remi proceeds with the audition while Kujo fights off the Grim Reapers members, including Heart and the other two leaders, Diamond and Club. During the acting section of the audition, Spade regains consciousness and attempts to stab Kujo, which he willingly takes in an attempt to get Remi to overcome her condition. He defeats Spade and his plan turns out to be successful, as Remi becomes able to cry again. He gives Remi the bracelet, which image of a sleeping lion becomes a symbol of her awakening from her "curse". Remi completes the audition while Kujo fights Heart, who confronts him again to avenge his brother. Kujo defeats Heart and collapses from his injuries.

In the epilogue, Remi did not win the main role, but the director has taken a liking to her and given her a prominent supporting role instead. Kujo survives his injuries, has quit his job as her manager and watches Remi on television at the pub with Charlie.

== Cast ==
- Seiji Takaiwa as Kazuma Kujo
- Miho Watanabe as Remi Watanuki
- Shun Nishime as Naoto "Spade" Hayama
- Takayuki Tsubaki as Masaru "Diamond" Kioka
- Masahiro Inoue as Yu "Club" Hiraga
- Gaku Sano as Ryosuke "Heart" Hayama
- Saki Tateno as Momoka Shiraishi, popular actress who also participates in the audition
- Miyuki Nishijima as Totsuka Toko, director of Remi's agency
- Kazutoshi Yokoyama as Charlie, former mercenary and Kujo's friend
- Kōji Nakamura as Kōji, the yakuza group's strongest enforcer

== Production ==
Good Morning, Sleeping Lion was first announced on January 17, 2022, as the first starring role of Seiji Takaiwa, best known for his work as suit actor in the Kamen Rider and Super Sentai franchises since 1988, which earned him the nickname "Mr. Heisei Kamen Rider". He was first approached for the role in late 2021 by Toei producer Hideaki Tsukada, who wanted to put him in a starring role.

On January 26, it was announced that Miho Watanabe would appear as the female lead, and four actors who portrayed the human form of Kamen Riders would also appear as the antagonists: Takayuki Tsubaki (Kamen Rider Blade), Masahiro Inoue (Kamen Rider Decade), Shun Nishime (Kamen Rider Ghost), and Gaku Sano (Kamen Rider Gaim). Watanabe would also perform the theme song, "Hitoribocchi no Kakumei" (ひとりぼっちの革命; lit. 'Lonely Revolution'), which is also her character's song in-universe. Years before the announcement, Watanabe, who was a member of girl group Hinatazaka46 at the time, had been told by a fortune teller that she would be involved in a project "related to Kamen Rider" on the group's weekly variety show, Hinatazaka de Aimashō.

Miyuki Nishijima, who has appeared in several Super Sentai series, is also a choreographer and instructed Takaiwa and Watanabe for their dance scenes. Kōji Nakamura, known as the leading suit actor for the Heisei-era Ultraman series, would appear as the yakuza group's strongest fighter.

Takaiwa commented that the fighting styles were more realistic than in his previous works, combining combat and self-defense and incorporating elements of Wing Chun, aikido, and submission wrestling, and as he was already in his fifties, he also asked the action directors to adjust the scenes accordingly. Takaiwa also described his on-set relationship with Watanabe as "like father and daughter" as she is the same age as his son, who also appears in the film as a Grim Reapers thug. On doing the wotagei scene, he commented that it was "more difficult" than the fight scenes. Meanwhile, Tsubaki commented that he wanted to return Takaiwa's favor by taking part in the film, and he and Sano were excited to engage in fight scenes against him.

== Release ==
Good Morning, Sleeping Lion was first released on the Hikari TV Channel on April 23, 2022. As of July 11, it has received an average audience rating of 4.5/5 from 542 Hikari TV subscribers. It was released theatrically in Thailand on November 17 and the Blu-ray home media was released on December 21, 2022. In 2023, the film was screened in the Asian Summer Film Festival in Vic, Spain (Festival Nits de cinema oriental de Vic) as part of the official competitive section.

== Sequel ==
A sequel was announced for release in spring of 2023, co-starring AKB48 member Yui Oguri as a food truck proprietress. Good Morning, Sleeping Lion 2 was released on April 12, 2023 on Hikari TV Channel and starred notable tokusatsu actors Kane Kosugi, Kento Handa, Toshiki Kashu, and Masayuki Deai.
