= Good Morning, Sleeping Lion 2 =

- Film poster
- Kanji: グッドモーニング、眠れる獅子2
- Revised Hepburn: Guddomōningu, Nemureru Shishi 2
- Directed by: Koichi Sakamoto
- Written by: Yoshiyuki Mitsumasu
- Starring: Seiji Takaiwa; Yui Oguri
- Production companies: Hikari TV; Toei Video; Toei Channel
- Release dates: April 12, 2023 (Lemino, Hikari TV Channel)
- Running time: 91 minutes
- Country: Japan
- Language: Japanese

Good Morning, Sleeping Lion 2 (Japanese: グッドモーニング、眠れる獅子2, Hepburn: Guddomōningu, Nemureru Shishi 2) is a 2023 web film, starring Seiji Takaiwa and Yui Oguri and directed by Koichi Sakamoto. It was released on Lemino and Hikari TV Channel on April 12, 2023. It is the sequel to Good Morning, Sleeping Lion and again featured prominent tokusatsu actors as the antagonists, with that film's heroine Miho Watanabe also reprising her role.

== Plot ==
After resigning as Remi Watanuki's manager in the previous film, former mercenary Kazuma Kujo works as a food deliveryman for the pub owned by his friend Charlie. After finishing a delivery, he stops by for lunch at the food truck "Oasis", operated by Akane Yuzuki. A group of loan sharks come to demand Akane's repayment of her missing father's 3 million yen debt, but Kujo manages to convince them to give her a one-week extension. Akane then recruits him as an apprentice chef. Oasis does not attract many customers since Akane insists on only serving expensive, gourmet menus.

Suguru Hachiya, a successful food entrepreneur, is secretly "Hornet", the head of Artemis, a group which organizes human huntings where criminals who eluded the law, referred to as "deer", are hunted and beaten up by victims of their crimes on his mansion grounds. Akane's father, Teruo, had been working for Artemis as an enforcer, or "Gundog", and decided to escape with evidence of their illegal activities, which he hides in the Oasis food truck. Hornet's chief enforcers, lawyer "Bear Claw" Kumami and anesthesiologist "Vulture" Takano, manage to track him down and learn of the food truck.

One day, Oasis is visited by Kurotora, a fellow former mercenary who has been both Kujo's ally and enemy on the battlefield. At his request, Kujo serves him a dish which Kujo used to cook often during the war. To Akane's confusion and chagrin, the humble "Battlefield Meal" attracts many customers, greatly increasing the food truck's revenue. Oasis receives a catering job for the shooting of Remi Watanuki's upcoming film, where Kujo, while in disguise, reunites with Remi and helps her train for her action scene; it is not made clear whether or not Remi recognizes him.

Kumami and Takano visit Oasis and offer to purchase it for 20 million yen, but Kujo asks them to leave. The next day, Kurotora, who is actually employed by Artemis, subdues Kujo with a sedative concocted by Takano, and Kujo is taken away. Akane finds the memory card hidden by her father and she and Charlie access the video evidence. Hachiya calls Akane, informing her that Kujo is in his custody and demands that she brings the memory card to him.

Akane goes to Hachiya's mansion and surrenders the memory card. Hachiya reveals that ever since his mother was beaten to death by teenage delinquents when he was a child, his sense of taste has become distorted and he can only see and taste food as dirt. After he became wealthy, he discovered that watching criminals being beaten up satisfied his hunger, which was the reason he established Artemis. He challenges Akane to serve him food that can restore his sense of taste, in exchange for her and Kujo's freedom and the previously offered 20 million yen. Meanwhile, Kujo has been designated a deer and fights Bear Claw, Vulture, and the other Gundogs on the mansion grounds.

Akane serves her usual gourmet fare, which fails to satisfy Hachiya. After defeating the Gundogs, Kujo is confronted by Kurotora inside the mansion, and their duel takes them to the kitchen where Akane is preparing her food. Kujo's determination to care for others inspires Akane to modify his Battlefield Meal into the "Battlefield Omurice", a meal similar to those Hachiya's mother used to make for him. Kurotora defeats Kujo and his heart stops beating. Akane manages to revive him and gives him some of the Battlefield Omurice, despite Hachiya's protests. Kujo regains his full fighting power and turns the table on Kurotora, defeating him. Hachiya samples the Omurice, which restores his sense of taste and, as he smiles in nostalgia, fulfills Akane's longtime wish to make others smile with her cooking. Akane and Kujo go home after she took only 20,000 yen as "catering fee".

Kujo resigns as apprentice chef. Akane and her father, having repaid their debt. continue running Oasis, which has become a popular lunch spot with the Battlefield Meal and Battlefield Omurice as its main menus.

== Cast ==
- Seiji Takaiwa as Kazuma Kujo
- Yui Oguri as Akane Yuzuki
- Kento Handa as Suguru Hachiya/Hornet
- Toshiki Kashu as Masaki Takano/Vulture
- Masayuki Deai as Hiroto Kumami/Bear Claw
- Kane Kosugi as Kurotora
- Miho Watanabe as Remi Watanuki
- Miyuki Nishijima as Totsuka Toko, director of Remi's agency
- Kazutoshi Yokoyama as Charlie, former mercenary and Kujo's friend

== Production ==
Good Morning, Sleeping Lion 2 was announced in February 2023, with AKB48 member Yui Oguri as heroine Akane Yuzuki, a chef who operates a food truck. Koichi Sakamoto returned as director, with Yoshiyuki Mitsumasu writing the screenplay.

In March, prominent tokusatsu actors Toshiki Kashu (Kamen Rider Agito), Kento Handa (Kamen Rider 555), Masayuki Deai (Eiji Takaoka/Bouken Silver of GoGo Sentai Boukenger) and Kane Kosugi (Jiraiya/Ninja Black of Ninja Sentai Kakuranger, as well as supporting roles in the Kamen Rider and Ultraman franchises) were revealed to portray members of the antagonistic organization Artemis. Miho Watanabe would also reprise her role as Remi Watanuki, who has become an action cinema starlet following the events of the previous film.

Sakamoto has revealed that the film's action sequences are influenced by the works of Hong Kong actor Jackie Chan, particularly Wheels on Meals (1984, known as Spartan X in Japan), which also inspired Kujo's new occupation. He incorporated several homages to Chan's work, including scenes where Kujo performs parkour. He also revealed that Watanabe's character would appear in action scenes, which she had wanted to do since the production of the previous film.

== Release ==
Good Morning, Sleeping Lion 2 was released on the streaming services Lemino and Hikari TV Channel on April 12, 2023. It was also submitted for the official competitive section of the Asian Summer Film Festival in Vic, Spain (Festival Nits de cinema oriental de Vic).

The Blu-ray home media was released by Toei Video on December 13, 2023. The disc includes behind-the-scenes footage, a recording of the premiere event, promotional material, and an audio commentary featuring the cast, director, and producers.

== Music ==
Theme song
- "Senbō" on YouTube

The theme song, "Senbō" (羨望; lit. 'Envy'), was performed by Rin Honoka, herself a tokusatsu veteran who has portrayed supporting characters in Kamen Rider Fourze and Kamen Rider Ghost. It was featured in the film's promotional trailer and included on the CD accompanying the deluxe Blu-ray edition.
