= Karan Ashley =

American actress, singer and host

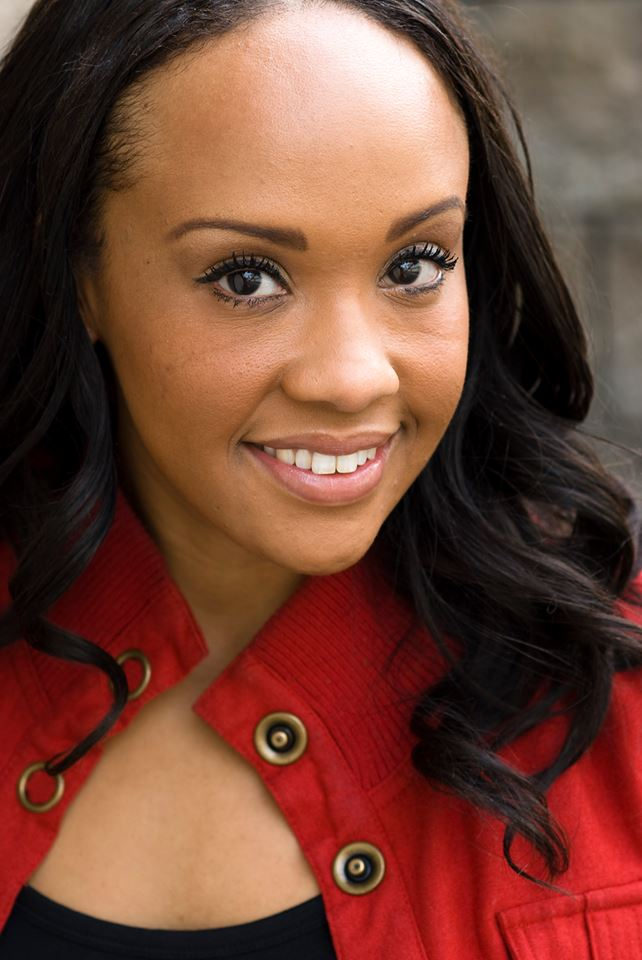
- Karan in 2016
- Born: Karan Ashley Jackson; Odessa, Texas, U.S.
- Occupations: Actress; singer; talk show host; radio show host; producer
- Years active: 1994–present

Karan Ashley Jackson is an American actress, singer, and talk show host. She is best known as Aisha Campbell, the second Yellow Power Ranger in the Fox Kids series Mighty Morphin Power Rangers. In 1992, she was a member of the short-lived girl group K.R.U.S.H, who featured a song to the soundtrack of Mo' Money. She was known as "Ashley Jackson" at this time.

== Life and career ==
Karan Ashley was born in Odessa, Texas. She is of mixed African-American and Mexican descent. Ashley graduated from David W. Carter High School in Dallas, Texas. She had been accepted to North Texas State University, but just before the first day of her first year, she landed the role of Aisha Campbell, the second Yellow Ranger in the Fox Kids series Mighty Morphin Power Rangers, replacing Thuy Trang (Trini Kwan). Her last regular Power Rangers appearance was in the finale of the third season of the series. In 2023, Ashley reprised the role of Aisha Campbell in the Netflix special, Mighty Morphin Power Rangers: Once & Always, which celebrates the 30th anniversary of the Power Rangers franchise and also marks her character's first appearance since her departure from the series in 1996, with the character Minh taking over the saber tooth tiger power.

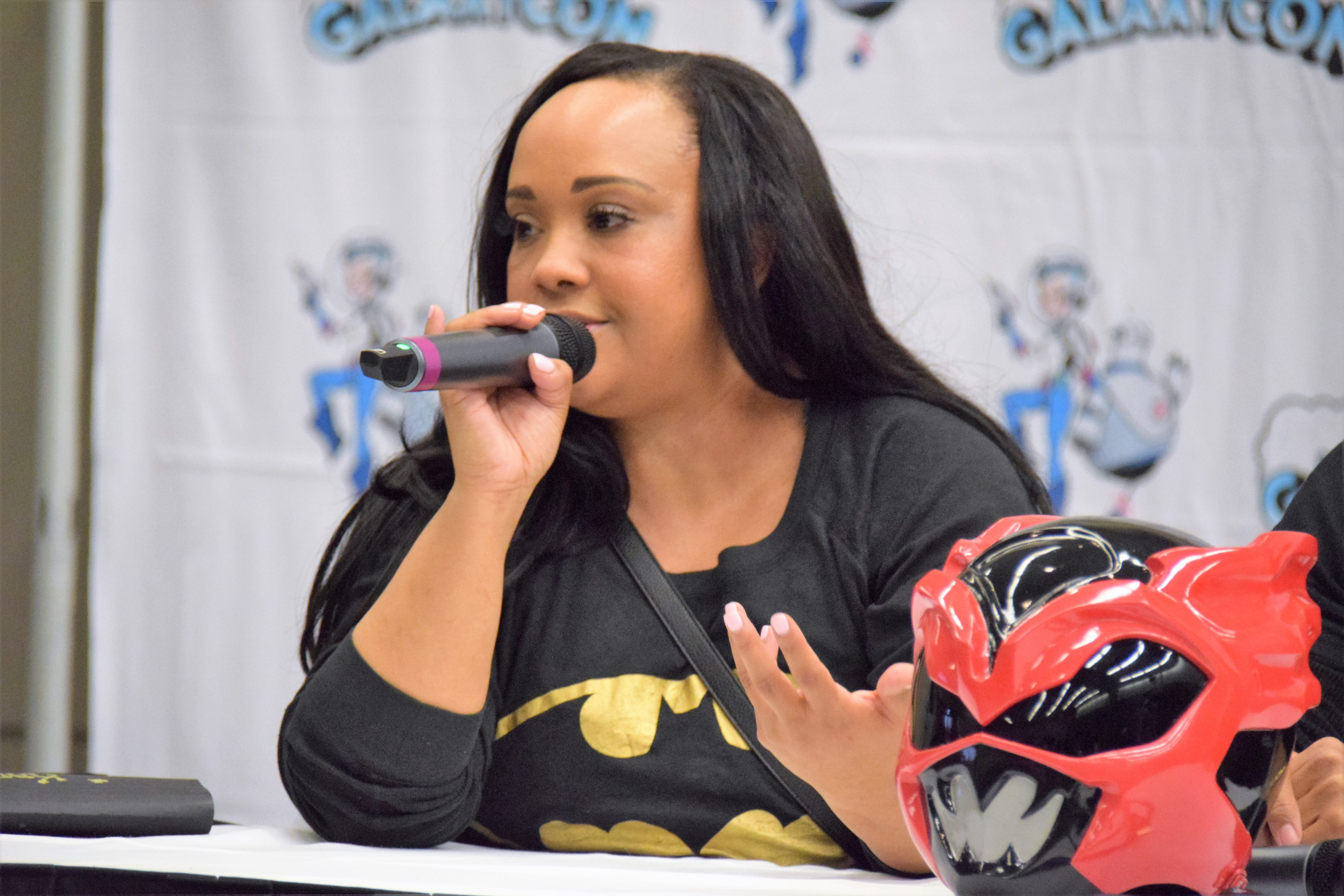
Karan Ashley, Power Rangers Q&A at Galaxy Con

Ashley has made guest appearances in TV shows such as Hangin' with Mr. Cooper, Kenan & Kel, and The Parkers, Taylor's Wall. Her first film debut as an executive producer was the independent film Devon's Ghost, alongside fellow Power Rangers alumnus Johnny Yong Bosch and director Koichi Sakamoto for Gag Order Films, Inc. While she also co-wrote Devon's Ghost, her first screenplay staple came with the film Unto Thee in 1999. She co-wrote the film with Gia and Tim Grace, and also starred in the movie.

In August 2010, Ashley was invited to Power Morphicon, the second Power Rangers fan convention in Pasadena, California. In September 2011, Ashley joined the National Talk Radio Show "UnCensored Radio" (formerly "Unscripted Radio") as a regular co-host/producer and co-hosted the show with Co-Host Katrina Johnson and Jeffrey Emmette filmed "Uncensored Reality", a reality show tied into Uncensored Radio.

In 2016, she starred in the web series Class Dismissed, alongside fellow "Power Rangers" alumni Nakia Burrise and Catherine Sutherland.

In 2017, she announced that she would be starring in and producing the short film The Order and had cast many Power Rangers alumni.

== Filmography ==
=== Film ===
- Mighty Morphin Power Rangers: The Movie (1995) as Aisha Campbell / The Yellow Ranger
- Devon's Ghost: Legend of the Bloody Boy (2005) as Symphony
- The Order (2017) as Alyssa
- Surge of Power: Revenge of the Sequel (2017) as Herself
- Mighty Morphin Power Rangers: Once & Always (2023) as Aisha Campbell / The second Yellow Ranger

=== Television ===
- In Studio 4-B (1994) as Various
- Mighty Morphin Power Rangers (1994–1995) as Aisha Campbell / The Yellow Ranger
- Mighty Morphin Alien Rangers (1996) as Aisha Campbell / The Yellow Ranger
- Hangin' With Mr. Cooper (1996) as Monica Carson
- Boston Common (1996–1997) as Wyleena Pritchett-Steele
- Kenan & Kel (1999) as Melissa—Season 4 episode 5, "The Limo"
- Power Rangers: The Lost Episode (1999) as Aisha Campbell (special episode/archival footage)
- The Steve Harvey Show (1999–2000) as Carrie McKnight (two episodes)
- The Parkers (2000) as Bride—Season 2, "Wedding Bell Blues"
- One on One (2002) as Angie—Season 1, "Me and My Shadow
- Class Dismissed (2016) as Brandy
- 99 to Beat (2026) as Herself—Season 2, 68th place

== See also ==
- List of Afro-Latinos
