= Miho Watanabe =

Japanese actress

- 渡邉美穂
- Watanabe in 2025
- Born: February 24, 2000 (age 26); Saitama Prefecture, Japan
- Occupations: Actress; television presenter
- Years active: 2017–present
- Agent: Queen-B
- Musical career
- Genre: J-pop
- Years active: 2017–2022
- Label: Sony
- Formerly of: Hinatazaka46
- Website: Official website

Miho Watanabe (Japanese: 渡邉美穂, Hepburn: Watanabe Miho; born February 24, 2000) is a Japanese actress and presenter. She starred in With You, Who Wanted to Be A Star (2021), Good Morning, Sleeping Lion (2022), Seishun Gestalt Houkai (2025), and Love Live! School Idol Musical the Drama (2024), the first live-action series adaptation of the popular Love Live! franchise.

Watanabe began her career as a member of the girl group Hinatazaka46 (formerly Hiragana Keyakizaka46) from 2017 to 2022 and made her acting debut in the group's drama Re:Mind (2017). She currently hosts the movie information show Cinema Addict on BS TV Tokyo and is an ambassador for the Women's Japan Basketball League. She is represented by the talent agency Queen-B.

== Early life ==
Watanabe played basketball from elementary to high school. She was the captain and point guard of her high school team, and participated in prefectural level tournaments. She briefly attended university after graduating high school, but dropped out to focus on her career.

== Career ==
=== 2017−2019: Early career ===
On August 13, 2017, Watanabe passed the audition for Keyakizaka46's subgroup Hiragana Keyakizaka46 and she was introduced two days later as one of the nine new second-generation members. She made her acting debut two months later in the group's drama Re:Mind, aired on TV Tokyo and Netflix, and was the only second-generation member to appear in the main story with the founding first-generation members.

Watanabe's first photobook, titled Hidamari (Note: 陽だまり (lit. 'Sunny Spot')) and photographed in New Zealand, was released on January 17, 2019. About 17,000 copies were sold in its release week, placing it first on the Oricon Weekly Photobook chart and fifth on the overall Weekly Book chart. It is the first and only solo photobook by a Hiragana Keyakizaka46 member, as subsequent books by other members were released after they were rebranded into Hinatazaka46 in February of that year.

=== 2020−2022: Acting ventures, departure from Hinatazaka46 ===
Watanabe appeared in the Hinatazaka46 dramas Dasada (2020) and Koeharu! (2021). She and fellow members Miku Kanemura and Akari Nibu, together known colloquially as the "Saitama Trio" after their shared home prefecture, lent their voices to characters named after themselves in the short animation series Pickles the Frog: Color of Feelings (2021).

In July 2020, Watanabe became a co-host for the basketball program Toriaezu NBA Fan ni nattemiru? (Note: とりあえずNBAファンになってみる?; transl. Want to Become an NBA Fan For Now?) on NBA Rakuten, the National Basketball Association's web streaming service in Japan.

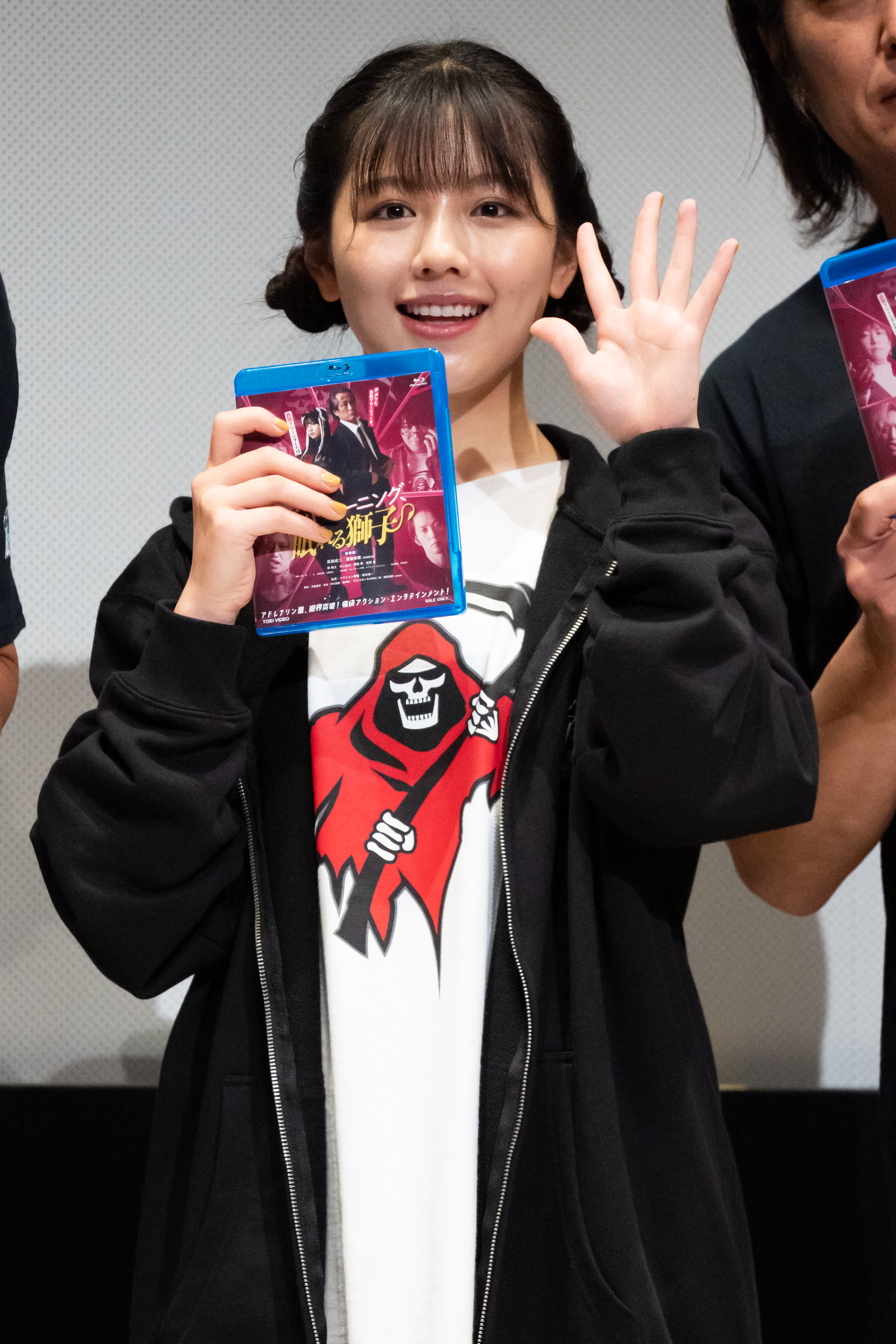
Watanabe at a Good Morning, Sleeping Lion press event, 2022.

Watanabe played female lead Nasa Kotosaka in the television drama adaptation of the romance/science fiction novel With You, Who Wanted to Be A Star (2021), alongside Gordon Maeda. The drama was aired on Nippon TV and Hulu Japan, with slightly different storylines for each version. She played female lead Remi Watanuki in the action web film Good Morning, Sleeping Lion (2022) alongside Seiji Takaiwa and several other Kamen Rider franchise veterans. On being offered the role, she remarked that a fortune teller on the Hinatazaka46 variety show Hinatazaka de Aimashō had predicted years earlier that "a Kamen Rider offer" would come to her.

On April 3, 2022, Watanabe announced that she would depart from Hinatazaka46 after the promotional cycle for the group's 7th single "Boku Nanka" (2022). She would be the first second-generation member, and the third after the group's rebrand, to leave the group. For that single, she served as center (lead performer) for the "aggressive, rock-sounding" track "Koishita Sakana wa Sora wo Tobu", (Note: The Fish in Love Flies in the Sky (恋した魚は空を飛ぶ)) and the music video for "Hikōkigumo ga Dekiru Riyū" (Note: 飛行機雲ができる理由 (The Reason Contrails Appear)) is about the closing of a dormitory named "Hidamari", a reference to her 2019 photobook; Real Sound described the latter as her "graduation song". Her "graduation" ceremony took place on June 28 at the Tokyo International Forum, Hall A; recordings of the concert were included on the Type A and Type B editions of Hinatazaka46's 8th single "Tsuki to Hoshi ga Odoru Midnight" (2022). A graduation commemorative book, titled Watashi ga Watashi de aru Tame ni (Note: 私が私であるために ("For Me to Be Who I Am")) was published by Nikkei BP, which sold 16,000 copies in its release week and placed fourth on the Oricon Weekly Book chart. She officially left Hinatazaka46 on July 31 and posted on her official blog for the last time the next day, August 1. In an interview with Oricon, Watanabe stated that she would continue her entertainment career and utilize her acting experience.

=== 2022−present: Solo career ===
On September 1, 2022, Watanabe announced her affiliation with the talent agency Queen-B. She also launched her Twitter and Instagram accounts, an official website and her own fanclub.

Watanabe appeared in the dramas Brother Trap (2022) and Shut Up (2023), and in an episode of The Solitary Gourmet Season 10 (2023). She made her full-fledged voice acting debut in the NHK short animation series Animation x Paralympic, in a 2023 episode featuring paracanoe athlete Monika Seryū. She then appeared in the NHK asadora The Tiger and Her Wings (2024) and co-starred in Love Live! School Idol Musical the Drama (2024), the first live-action series adaptation of the popular Love Live! franchise. She also appeared in the stage play Nigero! (2023) and musical Sunny (2023), and starred in the romantic comedy film You Are Mine! (2024) and teen film Seishun Gestalt Houkai (2025), where she portrayed a student suffering from sudden prosopagnosia.

Due to her experience in basketball, Watanabe became Saitama Basketball Ambassador in 2023 and the Women's Japan Basketball League Ambassador in 2024. She is also a member of the Saitama Prefecture public relations group, the Saitama Supporters Group, or Kobaton Club.

Watanabe continued to expand her acting career in 2025 with regular roles in the television dramas Junkissa Tsunagari, Heiten Shimasu (TV Aichi), Ameagari no Bokura ni Tsuite (TV Tokyo), and Jigoku wa Zen'i de Dekiteiru (Kansai TV). In 2026, she secured a co-lead role as Meiko Mori in the Tokyo MX romantic comedy series Yukari-kun's Unfair Gap alongside Hayato Takao and fellow former Hinatazaka46 member Hiyori Hamagishi, as well as the social drama Umanai Onna wa Dame desu ka? DINKs no Totsukitooka (TV Tokyo).

Watanabe launched her travel YouTube channel, Miho Watanabe's Tourism Ambassador Support Activities (渡邉美穂の観光大使の推し事, Watanabe Miho no Kankō Taishi no Oshigoto), in April 2026. Fellow former Hinatazaka46 members Sarina Ushio and Manamo Miyata made guest appearances in the debut video.

== Filmography ==
=== Film ===
Year	Title	Role	Notes	Ref(s)
2024	You Are Mine!	Akoko Sekikawa	Lead role	
2025	Seishun Gestalt Houkai (Note: 青春ゲシュタルト崩壊; lit. 'Youth Gestalt Collapse')	Asaha Mamiya	Lead role	
2026	Osomatsu-san: Jinrui Kuzu-ka Keikaku!!!!!? (Note: 映画 おそ松さん 人類クズ化計画!!!!!?; lit. 'Mr. Osomatsu: Human Scum-ification Project!!!!!?')	Totoko	Main cast	

=== Television drama series ===
Year	Title	Role	Notes	Ref(s)
2017	Re:Mind	Miho Watanabe	Main cast	
2020	Dasada	Saori Shinohara	Main cast	
2021	With You, Who Wanted to Be A Star	Nasa Kotosaka	Female lead	
2021	With You, Who Wanted to Be A Star: Another Story	Nasa Kotosaka	Female lead; alternate ending	
2021	Koeharu!	Amane Amasaki	Main cast	
2021	Women's Gourmet Burger Club – 2021 Summer Special	Emi Moribayashi	Substituting for regular cast Mirei Sasaki, who was on health leave	
2021	Pickles the Frog: Color of Feelings	Miho (voice)	Animation	
2022	The Last Train Bound for Nagoya 2022: Tarumi Line Spinoff	Homa Suzuki	Supporting role	
2022	Brother Trap	Eriko Miyake	Main cast	
2022	Good Morning, Sleeping Lion	Remi Watanuki	Female lead; television film	
2023	Good Morning, Sleeping Lion 2	Remi Watanuki	Female lead; television film	
2023	The Solitary Gourmet	Moe Ōtsuki	Season 10, episode 8	
2023	Animation x Paralympic	Mana Kurobe (voice)	Episode 16	
2023	Ichikei's Crow – Special	Midori Honda	Television film	
2023	Shut Up	Sana Asai	Main cast	
2024	Get Your Lover (Note: あなたの恋人、強奪します。, Anata no Koibito, Gōdatsushimasu)	Risa Hayakawa	Main cast	
2024	The Tiger and Her Wings	Mariko Akiyama	Asadora	
2024	Love Live! School Idol Musical the Drama	Rurika Tsubaki	Lead role	
2025	Junkissa Tsunagari, Heiten Shimasu	Akina Tsuji	Main cast	
2025	Ameagari no Bokura ni Tsuite (Note: 雨上がりの僕らについて; lit. 'About Us After the Rain')	Sumire Aizawa	Main cast	
2025	Jigoku wa Zen'i de Dekiteiru (Note: 地獄は善意で出来ている; lit. 'Hell is Made of Good Intentions')	Riko Tachibana	Main cast	
2026	Yukari-kun's Unfair Gap (Note: ゆかりくんはギャップがずるい, Yukari-kun wa Gyappu ga Zurui)	Meiko Mori	Lead role	
2026	Umanai Onna wa Dame desu ka? DINKs no Totsukitooka (Note: 産まない女はダメですか？ DINKsのトツキトオカ; lit. 'Does a Woman Have to Bear Child? DINKs' Gestational Period')	Chihiro Iwamoto	Supporting role	

=== Variety and talk shows ===
Year	Title	Role	Notes	Ref(s)
2020	Toriaezu NBA Fan ni nattemiru?	Co-host		
2021–2022	CHOTeN	Co-host		
2023–present	Cinema Addict	Host		

=== Music video ===
Year	Artist	Title	Notes	Ref(s)
2022	Ryujin Kiyoshi (feat. Leo Uchida)	"If I Stay Out of Life...?"	Main role	
2023	The Shes Gone	"Apostrophe"	Main role	

== Theater ==
Year	Title	Role(s)	Venue(s)	Ref(s)
2018	Ayumi	Multiple	AiiA 2.5 Theater Tokyo	

== Discography ==
Watanabe had participated in all Hinatazaka46 title songs until "Boku Nanka" (2022). Prominent appearances include:

- "Kirei ni Naritai" (Hashiridasu Shunkan, 2018), as a trio with Nao Kosaka and Akari Nibu
- "Yasashisa ga Jama o Suru" ("Do Re Mi Sol La Si Do" B-side, 2019), as the "Respect Three" trio with Shiho Katō and Hinano Kamimura
- "Akubi Letter" ("Tteka" B-side, 2021), as the "Color Chart" trio with Miku Kanemura and Akari Nibu
- "Koishita Sakana wa Sora wo Tobu" ("Boku Nanka" B-side, 2022), center (lead performer)

Appearances outside Sakamichi Series releases include:

- "Hatsukoi Door" (AKB48 single "Jiwaru Days" B-side, 2019), Sakamichi Series collaboration with AKB48 Group (SakamichiAKB)
- "Hitoribocchi no Kakumei" (Good Morning, Sleeping Lion theme song, 2022), solo song

== Other appearances ==
=== Radio ===
Year	Title	Role	Network	Notes	Ref(s)
2020–2022	Belc presents Hinatazaka46 no Yokei na Kotomade Yarimashō (Note: ベルク presents 日向坂46の余計な事までやりましょう; transl. Belc presents Hinatazaka46's Let's Do Extra Things)	Host	Tokyo FM		

=== Fashion shows ===
==== Tokyo Girls Collection ====
Year	Date	Title	Venue	Ref(s)
2020	January 11	"SDGs Promotion TGC Shizuoka 2020 by Tokyo Girls Collection"	Twin Messe Shizuoka	
2020	February 29	"Mynavi presents 30th Tokyo Girls Collection 2020 Spring/Summer"	Yoyogi National Gymnasium	
2020	September 5	"Mynavi presents 31st Tokyo Girls Collection 2020 Autumn/Winter Online"	Saitama Super Arena	

== Bibliography ==
Year	Title	ISBN	Publisher	Notes	Ref(s)
2019	Hidamari	ISBN 978-4344033993	Gentosha	Photobook	
2022	Watashi ga Watashi de aru Tame ni	ISBN 978-4296112593	Nikkei BP	Graduation commemorative book	
