= Space Squad =

- Official poster release

Japanese name
- Kanji: スペース・スクワッド
Transcriptions
- Revised Hepburn: Supēsu Sukuwaddo
- Directed by: Koichi Sakamoto
- Screenplay by: Naruhisa Arakawa
- Based on: Super Sentai and Space Sheriff Gavan by Saburo Yatsude
- Produced by: Tsuyoshi Nakano (Toei Video); Hideaki Tsukada (Toei); Kōichi Yada (Toei Agency)
- Starring: Yuma Ishigaki; Ryuji Sainei; Tsuyoshi Hayashi; Yousuke Itou; Ayumi Kinoshita; Mika Kikuchi; Tomokazu Yoshida; Suzuka Morita; Hiromi Sakimoto; Mikie Hara
- Narrated by: Hiroshi Kamiya
- Cinematography: Shu G. Momose
- Edited by: Ken Memita
- Music by: Michiaki Watanabe; Koichiro Kameyama
- Production companies: Toei Video Co., Ltd.; Bandai; Toei Advertising; Nippon Columbia; Toei Company
- Distributed by: Toei Company, Ltd.
- Release date: 17 June 2017
- Running time: 85 minutes
- Country: Japan
- Language: Japanese

Space Squad (スペース・スクワッド, Supēsu Sukuwaddo) is a set of two V-Cinema movies, first released in Japanese theaters on June 17, 2017 while DVD and Blu-Ray releases were made on separate dates. It features the crossover between 2012 Metal Hero Series movie Space Sheriff Gavan: The Movie and the twenty-eighth Super Sentai Series entry Tokusou Sentai Dekaranger, both works are distributed by Toei Company. (Note: Ryuji Sainei viewed both movies as Japanese versions of The Avengers.) In addition, past actors from Metal Hero Series are also set to appear as guests in the films.

Both films were directed by Koichi Sakamoto and written by Naruhisa Arakawa, who previously worked in Space Sheriffs: Next Generation. Another work from Space Sheriff Gavan was planned since 2015, but production was moved to 2016 due to Sakamoto's scheduling conflicts.

== Films ==
=== Space Squad: Gavan vs. Dekaranger ===
Space Squad: Gavan vs. Dekaranger (スペース・スクワッド ギャバンVSデカレンジャー, Supēsu Sukuwaddo Gyaban Tai Dekarenjā) is the first movie and was released on DVD and Blu-Ray on July 19, 2017. It features a joint struggle between the second generation Gavan and the Dekarangers. Lead actor Yuma Ishigaki stated that thinking differences is one of the movie's themes. Ishigaki as well participated in the series' writing while expressing his opinions on the acting. Joining the main cast are also Retsu Ichijouji (Space Sheriff Gavan) and Mad Gallant (Kyojuu Tokusou Juspion). (Note: Writer Arakawa mentioned Juspion as the first Metal Hero Series he watch and is amazed with Junichi Haruta's performance as Mad Gallant.) This movie will feature the marriage of Senichi "Sen-chan" Enari/Deka Green and Koume "Umeko" Kodou/Deka Pink, thus making Tokusou Sentai Dekaranger as the first Sentai team whose female members are all married, preceded by Jasmine/Deka Yellow in 10 Years After.

==== Plot ====
Geki Jumonji, the current Gavan, and his partner Shelly are about to raid a deal involving Mad Gallant, a member of the Space Criminal Organization Genmaku. However, instead of waiting for backup, Geki decides to confront the enemies himself. The deal is revealed to be a trap, with Mad Gallant defeating Geki and Shelly apparently killed by one of his companions. When Banban "Ban" Akaza from the Fire Squad arrives, he finds a wounded Geki and Shelly's body missing. Though eager to avenge Shelly, Geki is taken off the case by Director Sophie, who claims that in his current state, he is a liability. However, upon having a glance at her monitor, he finds the name of Marika "Jasmine" Hiwatari, a member of Earth's Dekarangers (who has the power of psychometry). Geki interrupts the marriage of Jasmine's fellow Dekarangers Senichi "Sen-chan" Enari and Koume "Umeko" Kodou to ask for their help, seemingly under a request from the Galactic Union Police.

With Houji "Hoji" Tomasu, Sen and Umeko in tow, Geki takes Jasmine to the crime scene, where they discover the identity of the shooter, Kuronen, and track him down to Earth where they confront him alongside Mad Gallant and his aid Benikiba as well. During the fight, Gavan's Laser Blade is destroyed, but he is rescued in the nick of time by Ban. As the criminals escape once again, Gavan and the others return to the Dekarangers' base, where their investigation connects Mad Gallant and his cohorts with a mysterious case of hundreds of people drained of all of their blood, and the manufacturing company "Smile and Gentleness". Geki and Umeko then question Lars, the president of Smile and Gentleness, who reveals that he is being threatened by Genmaku, with his secretary being one of their spies sent to keep an eye on him. The policemen then confront the secretary, who reveals herself as Benikiba, so Gavan leaves Umeko behind to protect Lars alone while he goes after Benikiba and Kuronen, only to find no one. When he returns, he finds Lars and a severely wounded Umeko, holding a mysterious black mask.

While Umeko is given medical treatment and the mask is analyzed by Swan, Sen blames Gavan for leaving Umeko behind to chase after vengeance. They also discover that Gavan forged his request for their assistance and he is sent to prison on Planet Bird. While investigating Lars' office, Hoji and Sen discover that Lars and Mad Gallant are the same person, while Benikiba storms the Dekarangers' HQ to extract Lars and return the mask to him, which he uses to transform into Mad Gallant. Lars then reveals that the mask gives him the powers and memories of the original Mad Gallant, who was defeated by Juspion decades ago. Mad Gallant and Benikiba defeat Deka Break and Deka Master before escaping. The Dekarangers investigate further and discover that all of the victims from the bloodsucking case had the ability to transform, and that Shelly had a higher power than the others; implying that she must be alive and being used by Lars to complete his plan. Umeko recovers and reveals that she was not left behind by Gavan, as she asked to deal with Benikiba by herself, but was unaware of Lars' true colors and was stabbed by him. Hoji, Sen, Jasmine, and Umeko then decide to break into the prison where Gavan is being held and rescue him. Ban also appears and joins them to chase after Lars and rescue Shelly.

As Lars beats Shelly in order to have her bleed enough to complete his weapon, "Satan Goth", Benikiba states that her mission assisting him is over and leaves. Gavan and the Dekarangers arrive soon after and while Gavan confronts Lars, the Dekarangers fight and defeat Kuronen. During his fight with Lars, Geki is approached by his senior and the original Gavan, Retsu Ichijouji, who gives him a new Laser Blade, the Laser Blade Origin, which was forged on Juspion's home planet, Ejin. Using it, Geki finally manages to defeat Lars and destroys Mad Gallant's mask. However, Lars lives long enough to activate Satan Goth before he is destroyed by Ban using the Deka Wing Cannon. After returning to the Galactic Police's base, Sophie reveals to Geki that she and Ban had arranged for him to work with the other Dekarangers since the beginning and Shelly decides to leave Geki's side and work at the main office. Geki is nominated as the first leader of the "Space Squad", instructing him to select other Sentai and Metal Heroes to form a team to take down Genmaku once and for all.

In the post credits, Sen and Umeko resume their marriage ceremony, but when they are about to kiss, an embarrassed Sen becomes constipated and runs to the bathroom, driving Umeko into rage.

=== Girls in Trouble: Space Squad Episode Zero ===
Girls in Trouble: Space Squad Episode Zero (ガールズ・イン・トラブル スペース・スクワッド EPISODE ZERO, Gāruzu In Toraburu Supēsu Sukuwaddo Episōdo Zero) is the second movie and was released on DVD and Blu-Ray on August 9, 2017. This movie focuses as a prologue to Gavan vs. Dekaranger, taking place in the day before the event. It focuses on the female casts of Dekaranger, Space Sheriff Gavan: The Movie and Space Sheriffs: Next Generation. Shooting was made simultaneously with Gavan vs. Dekaranger.

Something happened when Dekarangers' Twin Cam Angel (Jasmine and Umeko) met with Space Detectives Shelly, Sissy and Tammy in the day before Gavan vs. Dekaranger.

== Related media ==
=== Radio drama ===
A radio drama was broadcast from May 12, 2017 to June 16, 2017 as a collaboration project with Toei's radio program, Toei Official: Kenichi Suzumura and Hiroshi Kamiya's Kamen Radiranger (東映公認 鈴村健一・神谷浩史の仮面ラジレンジャー, Tōei Kōnin Suzumura Ken'ichi Kamiya Hiroshi no Kamen Rajirenjā). It serves as a prequel to Girls in Trouble and consists of six episodes written by Naruhisa Arakawa.

All six episodes are compiled into two separate arc. The first arc is Dekaranger Chapter (デカレンジャー編, Dekarenjā-hen), featuring Yousuke Itou as Sen and Mika Kikuchi as Umeko while the second arc is Gavan Chapter (ギャバン編, Gyaban-hen), featuring Yuma Ishigaki as Geki and Suzuka Morita as Shelly. Radio personalities Kenichi Suzumura and Hiroshi Kamiya made their guest appearances as Mysterious Beast Hyoihyoi (不思議獣ヒョイヒョイ, Fushigi-jū Hyoihyoi) and Suppanian Parapan (スッパン星人パラパン, Suppan Seijin Parapan) respectively.

=== Uchu Sentai Kyuranger ===
Yuma Ishigaki, Ryuji Sainei, Yousuke Itou, Mika Kikuchi and Tetsu Inada also went on to reprise their respective roles in episode 18 of 2017 Super Sentai Series Uchu Sentai Kyuranger, featuring the crossover of Tokusou Sentai DekaRanger's Ban, Uchuu Keiji Gavan's Geki Jumonji (Gavan's successor), and the 41st installment in the Super Sentai series Uchuu Sentai KyuuRanger.

=== Uchu Sentai Kyuranger vs. Space Squad ===
2018 saw the release of a V-cinema sequel featuring the Space Squad, Kyurangers and several other heroes from the Metal Hero and Super Sentai Series.

== Cast ==
Space Squad: Gavan vs. Dekaranger

- Geki Jumonji (十文字 撃, Jūmonji Geki): Yuma Ishigaki (石垣 佑磨, Ishigaki Yūma)
- Banban Akaza (赤座 伴番, Akaza Banban): Ryuji Sainei (さいねい 龍二, Sainei Ryūji)
- Houji Tomasu (戸増 宝児, Tomasu Hōji): Tsuyoshi Hayashi (林 剛史, Hayashi Tsuyoshi)
- Senichi Enari (江成 仙一, Enari Sen'ichi): Yousuke Itou (伊藤 陽佑, Itō Yōsuke)
- Marika Hiwatari (日渡 茉莉花, Hiwatari Marika): Ayumi Kinoshita (木下 あゆ美, Kinoshita Ayumi)
- Koume Kodou (胡堂 小梅, Kodō Koume): Mika Kikuchi (菊地 美香, Kikuchi Mika)
- Tekkan Aira (姶良 鉄幹, Aira Tekkan): Tomokazu Yoshida (吉田 友一, Yoshida Tomokazu)
- Shelly (シェリー, Sherī): Suzuka Morita (森田 涼花, Morita Suzuka)
- Lars (ラーズ, Rāzu): Hiromi Sakimoto (崎本 大海, Sakimoto Hiromi)
- Benikiba (紅牙): Mikie Hara (原 幹恵, Hara Mikie)
- Pon Emi (ポン・エミ): Miyuki Nishijima (西嶋 美幸, Nishijima Miyuki)
- Receptionist: Ibuki Yoshikawa (吉川 依吹, Yoshikawa Ibuki)
- Retsu Ichijouji (一条寺 烈, Ichijōji Retsu): Kenji Ohba (大葉 健二, Ōba Kenji) (Note: Kenji Ohba's final role prior to his passing on May 6, 2026)
- Sophie (ソフィ, Sofi): Ryoko Yuui (遊井 亮子, Yūi Ryōko)
- Swan Shiratori (白鳥 スワン, Shiratori Suwan): Mako Ishino (石野 真子, Ishino Mako)
- Hikaru Hiwatari (日渡 氷狩, Hiwatari Hikaru; Voice): Yuto Uemura (上村 祐翔, Uemura Yūto)
- Doggie Kruger (ドギー・クルーガー, Dogī Kurūgā; Voice): Tetsu Inada (稲田 徹, Inada Tetsu) (Note: Tetsu also performs a cameo appearance in Sen and Umeko wedding at the post credit scene.)
- Kuronen (クローネン, Kurōnen; Voice), Priest: Tomokazu Seki (関 智一, Seki Tomokazu)
- Mad Gallant (マッドギャラン, Maddo Gyaran; Voice): Junichi Haruta (春田 純一, Haruta Jun'ichi)
- Narration: Hiroshi Kamiya (神谷 浩史, Kamiya Hiroshi)

Girls in Trouble: Space Squad Episode Zero

- Marika Hiwatari: Ayumi Kinoshita
- Koume Kodou: Mika Kikuchi
- Shelly: Suzuka Morita
- Sissy (シシー, Shishī): Misaki Momose (桃瀬 美咲, Momose Misaki)
- Tammy (タミー, Tamī): Mayu Kawamoto (川本 まゆ, Kawamoto Mayu)
- Maki (マキ): Minami Tsukui (佃井 皆美, Tsukui Minami)
- Vivian (ビビアン, Bibian): Sanae Hitomi (人見 早苗, Hitomi Sanae)
- Benikiba: Mikie Hara
- Sophie: Ryoko Yuui
- Birdie (バーディー, Bādī; Voice): Mami Kingetsu (金月 真美, Kingetsu Mami)
- Hellvira (ヘルバイラ, Herubaira; Voice): Michie Tomizawa (富沢 美智恵, Tomizawa Michie)
- Doggie Kruger (Voice): Tetsu Inada
- Mad Gallant (Voice): Junichi Haruta
- Narration: Hiroshi Kamiya

== Theme songs ==
- Space Squad (スペース・スクワッド, Supēsu Sukuwaddo)
  - Lyrics: Akira Kushida (串田 アキラ, Kushida Akira), YOFFY
  - Composition: Michiaki Watanabe (渡辺 宙明, Watanabe Michiaki)
  - Arrangement: Project.R (Michiaki Watanabe and Koichiro Kameyama)
  - Artists: Gekitotsu Kyōdai (激突兄弟; Clash Brothers) (Akira Kushida and YOFFY)
  The theme song of Gavan vs. Dekaranger.
- Girls Say Hallelujah! (ガールズ セイ ハレルヤ!, Gāruzu Sei Hareruya!)
  - Lyrics: Shoko Fujibayashi (藤林 聖子, Fujibayashi Shōko)
  - Composition/Arrangement: YOFFY
  - Artists: Girls Squad (ガールズ・スクワッド, Gāruzu Sukuwaddo) (Ayumi Kinoshita, Mika Kikuchi, Suzuka Morita, Misaki Momose and Mayu Kawamoto)
  The ending theme of Girls in Trouble.

== Bibliography ==
- 『スペース・スクワッド ギャバンVSデカレンジャー/ガールズ・イン・トラブル スペース・スクワッド エピソードゼロ』パンフレット 2017年6月17日発行 編集・執筆：用田邦憲 発行所：東映ビデオ
- Uchusen（Hobby Japan）
  - 宇宙船. Vol. 154. ホビージャパン. 2016-10-01. ISBN 978-4-7986-1312-3.
  - 宇宙船. Vol. 155. ホビージャパン. 2016-12-29. ISBN 978-4-7986-1360-4.
  - 宇宙船. Vol. 156. ホビージャパン. 2017-04-01. ISBN 978-4-7986-1434-2.
- Toei Hero MAX（Tatsumi Publishing）
  - 東映ヒーローMAX. Vol. 54. 辰巳出版. 2016-10-10. ISBN 978-4-7778-1750-4.
  - 東映ヒーローMAX. Vol. 55. 辰巳出版. 2017-03-10. ISBN 978-4-7778-1831-0. Magazine Code： 66118-18.
