= Hiroshi Maeda =

- Born: November 1, 1961 (age 63); Kōchi Prefecture, Japan

Hiroshi Maeda (前田 浩, Maeda Hiroshi, born November 1, 1961) is a professional Japanese stunt man and suit actor from Kōchi Prefecture who is best known for portraying the Red Ranger in most of the Power Rangers series as well as the Tyranno Ranger, Red Hawk and Five Red in the 1992 Super Sentai series Kyōryū Sentai Zyuranger.

He is a representative of Action School "Hero's Factory", based in Okinawa. His height is 176 centimeters. Maeda rides Harley-Davidson and Ducati motorcycles.

Maeda is a freelancer, although he was affiliated with ATC, Japan Action Club (now Japan Action Enterprise) and Red Action Club. After working on 1992's Kyōryū Sentai Zyuranger as the Tyranno Ranger, Maeda played the Red Rangers from Power Rangers, which became one of his most notable roles. Kazuo Niibori was Maeda's teacher.

Recently, a high level of action has been announced at an attraction show. At Hero's Factory, the school also does junior reading.

== Performance Works ==
=== Local ===
==== Television ====
- Space Sheriff Sharivan (1983) - Private Secretary (episode 29)
- Jaaman Tanteidan Maringumi (1988) - Great Phantom Thief Jigoma
- Tokkyuu Shirei Solbrain (1991) - Knight Fire
- Choujin Sentai Jetman (1991) - Red Hawk
- Kyōryū Sentai Zyuranger (1992) - Tyranno Ranger
- Tokusou Robo Janperson (1993) - Gangibson
- GARO (2005) - Dark Fang Kiba
- Garo Special: Byakuya no Maju (2007) - DAN, The Knight of the Midnight Sun
- Unofficial Sentai Akibaranger (2012) - Past Sentai Warrior

==== Film ====
- Specter (2005) - Specter
- Kamen Rider The First (2005) - Kamen Rider 1
- Kamen Rider The Next (2007) - Kamen Rider 1
- Kamen Rider × Super Sentai: Super Hero Taisen (2012) - Tyranno Ranger

==== Original Video Works ====
- Ultraman vs. Kamen Rider (1993) - Kamen Rider 1
- Jushin Thunder Liger: Fist of Thunder (1995) - Bounty Viper

=== Overseas ===
==== Television ====
- Mighty Morphin Power Rangers (1993) - Red Power Ranger (Second and Third Seasons)
- Power Rangers: Turbo (1997) - Red Turbo Ranger
- Power Rangers: In Space (1998) - Red Space Ranger
- Power Rangers: Lost Galaxy (1999) - Red Galaxy Ranger, Magna Defender
- Power Rangers: Lightspeed Rescue (2000) - Red Lightspeed Ranger
- Power Rangers: Time Force (2001) - Red Time Force Ranger
- Power Rangers: Wild Force (2002) - Red Lion Ranger
- Power Rangers: Ninja Storm (2003) - Red Wind Ranger
- Kamen Rider Dragon Knight (2006/short film) (2009/airing) - Dragon Knight

==== Film ====
- Turbo: A Power Rangers Movie (1997) - Red Turbo Ranger, Turbo Megazord
