= Koi ni Mudaguchi =

Japanese manga series

- First tankōbon volume cover

恋に無駄口
- Genre: Romantic comedy
- Manga
- Written by: Ryoko Fukuyama
- Published by: Hakusensha
- Imprint: Hana to Yume Comics
- Magazine: Hana to Yume
- Original run: September 5, 2019 – July 5, 2023
- Volumes: 12
- Television drama
- Directed by: Junta Yamaguchi; Ayuta Yoshikawa; Miyako Yasojima
- Produced by: Yūdai Minami; Junpei Sakurada
- Written by: Natsu Hashimoto; Tomohiro Ōtoshi; Ruri Hyōdō
- Original network: ABC, TV Asahi
- Original run: April 17, 2022 – June 19, 2022
- Episodes: 10
- icon

Koi ni Mudaguchi (Japanese: 恋に無駄口; lit. 'Chatter About Love') is a Japanese manga series written and illustrated by Ryoko Fukuyama. It was serialized in Hakusensha's shōjo manga magazine Hana to Yume from September 2019 to July 2023, with its chapters collected into 12 tankōbon volumes. A television drama adaptation aired from April to June 2022.

== Characters ==
Yūri Nishina (仁科 悠里, Nishina Yūri)
Portrayed by: So Okuno
Ema Kanō (叶依 麻, Kanō Ema)
Portrayed by: Yui Oguri
Shin Mayama (真山 深, Mayama Shin)
Portrayed by: Rintarō Mizusawa
Mashiro Kagami (各務 ましろ, Kagami Mashiro)
Portrayed by: Eito Konishi
Aoi Shida (志田 葵, Shida Aoi)
Portrayed by: Maito Fujioka

== Media ==
=== Manga ===
Written and illustrated by Ryoko Fukuyama, Koi ni Mudaguchi was serialized in Hakusensha's shōjo manga magazine Hana to Yume from September 5, 2019, to July 5, 2023. The series was collected into 12 tankōbon volumes published from February 2020 to September 2023.

==== Volumes ====
No.	Japanese release date	Japanese ISBN
1	February 20, 2020	978-4-59-222321-4
2	June 19, 2020	978-4-59-222322-1
3	October 20, 2020	978-4-59-222323-8
4	March 19, 2021	978-4-59-222324-5
5	July 20, 2021	978-4-59-222325-2
6	November 19, 2021	978-4-59-222326-9
7	March 18, 2022	978-4-59-222327-6
8	June 20, 2022	978-4-59-222328-3
9	October 20, 2022	978-4-59-222329-0
10	February 20, 2023	978-4-59-222330-6
11	May 19, 2023	978-4-59-222446-4
12	September 20, 2023	978-4-59-222447-1

=== Drama ===
In March 2022, a television drama adaptation was announced, starring So Okuno, Rintarō Mizusawa, Eito Konishi, and Maito Fujioka. The series is directed by Junta Yamaguchi, Ayuta Yoshikawa, and Miyako Yasojima. The screenplay is written by Natsu Hashimoto, Tomohiro Ōtoshi, and Ruri Hyōdō. Yūdai Minami and Junpei Sakurada serve as the series' producers. It aired on ABC and TV Asahi from April 17 to June 19, 2022. Kana-Boon performed the theme song "Merry-Go-Round" (メリーゴーランド).

== Reception ==
In 2021, Koi ni Mudaguchi was nominated for the seventh Next Manga Awards in the Best Printed Manga category.

== See also ==
- Anonymous Noise, another manga series by the same author
