= Travelers: Jigen Keisatsu =

- Directed by: Koichi Sakamoto
- Written by: Sōtarō Hayashi
- Produced by: Jungo Maruta
- Starring: Nao Nagasawa; Ayumi Kinoshita; Yuko Takayama
- Music by: Hiroki Nozaki
- Production companies: Changhe Films; Good Films Workshop; Next Media Animation; Thefool; W Field; Pixelfly Digital Effects
- Distributed by: Kadokawa Pictures
- Release date: April 13, 2013
- Running time: 80 min.
- Country: Japan
- Language: Japanese

Travelers: Jigen Keisatsu (トラベラーズ 次元警察, Toraberāzu Jigen Keisatsu; lit. 'Travelers: Dimensional Police') is a Japanese science fiction film directed by Koichi Sakamoto, starring Nao Nagasawa, Ayumi Kinoshita and Yuko Takayama. It was released in Japan on April 13, 2013.

== Plot ==
Ai Osaka is a Dimensional Police officer who travels into an alternate dimension named "Retro World" (レトロワールド, Retoro Wārudo) to hunt down a serial killer named Todoroki Kotarou. While encountering her target, she encounters her former partner Yui Momose who works for the criminal organization "Doubt" (ダウト, Dauto). Losing her target on the run, she goes to the informant of Retro World to seek intel of where Todoroki may strike next. Tracking the location to a school where her target of this dimension is a schoolteacher and Ai catches a glimpse of her Retro World counterpart. Todoroki arrives demanding to know where his counterpart is but is attacked by Ai.

During the fight, Yui apprehends Todoroki and tell Ai to remember her true self, but another fight endures between the two leading Yui to retreat. Taking her target back to Original World (オリジナルワールド, Orijinaru Wārudo) for interrogation, Todoroki is killed due to an explosive inside him. Looking back on her past from a year ago, Ai and Yui were on a case when they were approached by an unknown assassin. It turns out to be Yui’s brother Ken who was seemingly killed. He promises to tell her everything but only if she comes with him. Back in the present, Ai receives a report that a girl named Haruka Saegusa maybe a potential target to Doubt due to her having a special power. Arriving in Fairy World, (フェアリーワールド, Fearī Wārudo) Ai seeks out the informant of that dimension. Learning that Haruka is a famous fortune teller and has a bracelet that giver her magical powers. Ai seeks out Haruka and witnesses Haruka’s power of giving a daughter to walk again.

Just then the two are attacked by the Fairy World’s version of Yui who wants the bracelet to start a revolution. Ai manages to talk sense into the alternate Yui, and she ultimately commits suicide feeling remorse for her actions. As the real Yui and Ken arrive, Haruka teleports her to the dimensional street but ultimately loses her grip. Ai comes across a dimensional gate and arrives in Lost World (ロストワールド, Rosuto Wārudo) on the run from soldiers. Saving a homeless kid from being beaten up, Ai is captured. While her bodysuit protects her from torture, Bridge arrives to help. To evade capture by Yui, Ai ends up back in Retro World. Taken into care by Retro versions of Ken and Yui, Ai agrees to help their business in exchange. Later, Ai believes that the Retro version of Haruka could be a potential target and seeks the informant for her whereabouts. Retro Haruka tells Ai that she was killed in an explosion. This was later confirmed by the Retro Ken and Yui due to a dagger left behind by Todoroki and Retro Ai was killed. Running off to confront informant, he tells Ai that Doubt is on the move. Arriving back at the vet, Retro Ken and Yui are killed by members of Doubt.

When the real Yui and Ken arrive, Haruka decided to give Ai the truth. Ken explains that his research started years ago when Haruka of Original World used her body to accelerate the opening of the dimensional streets, killing herself in the process. Refusing to assist in further research, Ken and his team were removed from the project and the termination was covered up by the government. Setting up a resistance, Ken continued to work on the Strike Vehicle and traveled to Fairy World. Learning that his counterpart was suffering from an incurable illness, he helped to assist the resistance in return that Ken would look after his people when his death came. Chief Madarame Dogen was the one who was pulling the strings and went through a process to give him eternal life, thus becoming The Brain. Using criminals, he started his plan to terminate those who can travel between dimensions. Yui contacted Todoroki to get information, but The Brain didn’t want any loose ends and sent Ai to capture him. Ken mentions that Madarame was a good man in Lost World and was trying to revive that world after World War III, but was killed by The Brain so he could gain political control of Prison Hell.

Haruka uses her magic to restore Ai’s original memories, and Ai wonders why she had lived two lives. Yui explains that the Ai of Original World discovered how The Brain was controlling the dimensional street and exchanged this information to Ken. When The Brain found out, he sent Original Ai to Lost World in place of Lost World Ai and controlled her memory. Ken explains that now the balance between dimensions is stable but if everyone else discovers the existence of parallel worlds, all of them would merge with Original World and destroy all others. Ai joins in and helps save her counterpart from execution. Feeling terrible for her actions, Original Ai assures she is not a criminal and believes that that time expands like a tree branch and people are split to chosen and unchosen worlds and that they keep expanding. The Brain arrives and attempts to kill Ai but her Original counterpart sacrifices herself. Haruka takes Yui and Ai, and then shut down Brain’s programming.

Just then, they find Madarame back in his human body with Haruka’s Retro counterpart hostage. He plans to rule all parallel worlds and lead humans the way he wants to. Sending out a reprogrammed Bridge to eliminate them, Ai is forced to shoot him and Madarame. However due to Haruka’s bracelet he stole, he is revived and uses the power on Ai and Yui. Just as he is about to kill Ai, Bridge jumps in and deflects his attack back at him. Realizing that Bridge is the Original World’s informant that she met in every other dimension, he uses the last of his life to help kill Madarame. Haruka recovers her bracelet and travels back to Fairy World, while Ai and Yui resume their normal duties with Ken now acting as chief.

== Cast ==
- Nao Nagasawa as Ai Osaka
- Ayumi Kinoshita as Yui Momose
- Yuko Takayama as Haruka Saegusa
- Kohei Yamamoto Bridge
- Kenji Ebisawa as Ken Momose
- Kentaro Shimazu as Brain
