= Suit actor =

Tokusatsu actors in costumes

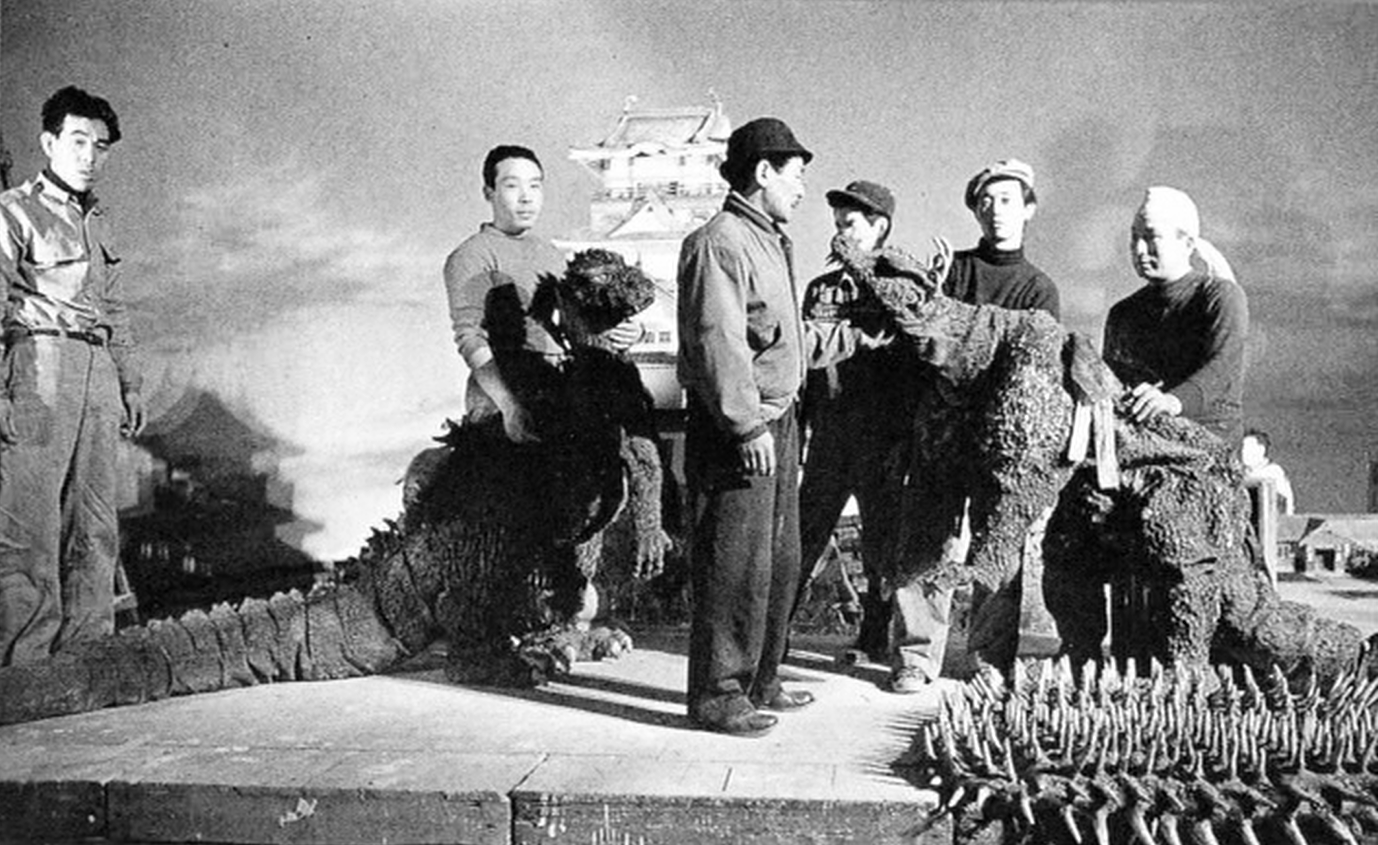
Suit fitting on the set of Godzilla Raids Again (1955), with Haruo Nakajima portraying Godzilla on the left

A suit actor (スーツアクター, sūtsu akutā) is a member of, usually, a Japanese tokusatsu production who works similar to a stunt performer. However, the suit actor does all of their stunts while in a full costume that normally obscures their identity (typically the transformed character) from the viewer, and the actor's voice is dubbed during after-recording process (アフレコ, afureko). The word is typically used when discussing Japanese stunt performers and is rarely used in any other context.

== Overview ==
A suit actor portrays characters that are inhuman in appearance, such as henshin (i.e., transforming heroes), kaiju, and robots, by wearing a performance costume.

Notable examples include Haruo Nakajima, the first suit actor to play Godzilla (later succeeded by Kenpachiro Satsuma for the Heisei films) and Ben Chapman, who portrayed the Gill-man in Creature From the Black Lagoon.

Within the genre of transforming heroes, past productions had an actor double as the costumed hero and their civilian form. For example, in a style that would influence future tokusatsu productions, Seven Color Mask featured acrobatic stunts performed by Sonny Chiba. Similarly, early episodes of the first Kamen Rider had in-costume stunts by Hiroshi Fujioka. Toei's Super Sentai franchise has also had their costumed actors double. There are even cases where a suit actor might appear out-of-costume as a guest character.

Before achieving their big breaks in film and television, many suit performers start out as cheaply contracted actors. Usually, to preserve their reputation for future roles, suit actors may avoid identifying themselves. However, for more notable productions such as Godzilla and Ultraman, many performers have openly embraced their roles. For example, the inimitable acting style of Kamen Rider performers Tetsuya Nakashiki and Seiji Takaiwa are great sources of pride. Furthermore, the recent influx in the popularity of tokusatsu has allowed fans and entertainers such as Rena Matsui to become more vocal about their love and respect for the art of suit acting.

Some children's theater productions may also include suit acting in the form of costumed dolls, which are also performed by actors on-stage. Likewise, mascot characters are usually performed by non-professional or part-time workers. A notable example originates from the Hokkaido TV Broadcasting (HTB) program How Do You Like Wednesday?, where the network's mascot On-chan was played by amateur character actor Akira Yasuda. By contrast, professional baseball team mascots are assigned to individuals who can perform complex maneuvers while on the field. While these actors usually are not identified, former Hankyu Braves/Orix Blue Wave member Osamu Shimano is one of the few individuals who was credited.

== Word origin ==
The term first came to fruition in 1992, where the credit "Suitmation Actor" was used in the program Godzilla Kaiju Super Quiz. Prior to this, the more common term was "costumed actor".

In Hollywood, costumed actors are rarely credited as "suit performers." One exception can be found in the end credits of Terminator Salvation, where creature actor Brian Steele is credited as "T-600 Suit Performer."

Within Japanese online circles, suit actors may also be called "中の人" (nakanohito).

== Acting techniques ==
Since the suits can be incredibly heavy and difficult to breathe in, suit actors must be physically durable. Certain roles may require extensive sword fights, actions and stunts within a physically restrictive environment: work far beyond the role of a traditional stuntperson.

Additionally, because their faces are not visible to the audience, extensive body language and pantomime are crucial skills.

However, the lack of any facial identification allows actors to play multiple roles regardless of age and appearance. As a result, particularly versatile suit actors such as Kazuo Niibori and Seiji Takaiwa have been able to play their characters for over 20 years. In certain cases, a male suit actor with a petite build might perform a female character. However, there can be some dissonance if the suit actor has a different physique from the actor playing the hero's ‘civilian form’.

Despite their differences, the merit of not showing one's face is similar to that of voice actors.

Within the genre of ‘transforming heroes’, suit actors usually perform all their character's stunts. However, instances of high stakes action might impede on an actor's ability to perform.

== Accreditations ==
Although their performances are captured on-camera, suit actors often do not receive individual credit for their work. For example, the acting credits of Toei's tokusatsu programs usually do not attribute their suit actors to the characters they have played, instead grouping their names together by the firm they belong to (e.g. ‘Japan Action Enterprise’, ‘Japan Action Club’, etc.). However, there are exceptions. For example, the final episode of Kikai Sentai Zenkaiger directly credited the suit actors to the heroes they played.

The opening credits for the Chouseishin Series and Tomica Hero: Rescue Fire attribute the suit actors as "Name After Transformation: Suit Actor." The Ultra series previously credited the performers as "Hero Name: Suit Actor" and "Kaiju: Suit Actor." Beginning with Ultraman Tiga, the attribution changed to "Special Action: Suit Actor." However, the credit reverted back to "Role name: Suit Actor" beginning with Ultraman X. The Godzilla series has consistently formatted their credits as "Kaiju: Suit Actor." Suit actors may also appear in roles that require them to show their face, such as a supporting character or a ghostly figure.

== Training ==
Many agencies specializing in action stars have established specialized divisions for training suit actors. For example, the Japan Action Enterprise (JAE) has a year-long training program for swordsmanship, martial arts, and stunts. There are also vocational schools for action stars. Despite this, only a small number of trainees have been able to become suit actors. During a segment of NHK Educational TV's Catch Tomorrow: Heisei Youth Work Guide, former JAE associate Norito Ito explained that over the course of three years, his class size had decreased from 21 to 6.

After a year's worth of training, suit actors gain exposure to the atmosphere of being on set by becoming an apprentice to a senior suit actor. While their first roles might be incredibly minor and indistinguishable, with enough experience, a suit actor will be able to play more major characters. Other performers may decide to become a staff member, such as a swordsman or action director, or a lecturer in the training department.

== List of notable suit actors ==
- Javier Botet
- Yasuhiko Imai (今井 靖彦, Imai Yasuhiko)
- Kenji Ohba (大葉 健二, Ōba Kenji)
- Toshiaki Karasawa (唐沢 寿明, Karasawa Toshiaki)
- Seiji Takaiwa (高岩 成二, Takaiwa Seiji)
- Chie Tanabe (田邊 智恵, Tanabe Chie)
- Kevin Peter Hall (Most famous for his portrayal of the Predator from 1987 to 1990)
- Verne Troyer (Ferbus in Saban's Masked Rider)
- Haruo Nakajima (中島 春雄, Nakajima Haruo) (Most famous for his portrayal of Godzilla from 1954 to 1972)
- Kazuo Niibori (新堀 和男, Nībori Kazuo)
- Kenpachiro Satsuma (薩摩剣八郎, Satsuma Kenpachirō) (Most famous for his portrayal of Godzilla from 1984 to 1995, Hedorah from Godzilla vs. Hedorah and Gigan from Godzilla vs. Gigan)
- Hiroshi Maeda (前田 浩, Maeda Hiroshi)
- Mark Musashi (マーク武蔵, Māku Musashi)
- Hisanori Ōiwa (大岩 永徳, Ōiwa Hisanori) (under the stage name Eitoku (永徳))
- Tsutomu Kitagawa (喜多川務, Kitagawa Tsutomu) (Most famous for his portrayal of Shishi Ranger from Gosei Sentai Dairanger and Godzilla from 1999 to 2004)
- Brian Steele
- Tom Woodruff Jr. (Most famous for his portrayal of Xenomorph from 1992 to 2007)
- Ian Whyte (Most famous for his portrayal of the Predator from Alien vs. Predator from 2004 to 2007, the Engineer in Prometheus (2012), and various characters in Game of Thrones).
- Shoichi Hirose (広瀬正一, Hirose Shoichi) (Most famous for his portrayal of King Ghidorah from Ghidorah, the Three-Headed Monster and King Kong from King Kong vs. Godzilla).

== Affiliated companies ==
*Listed Alphabetically

- E Production (affiliated with Tokyo Disneyland and The Oriental Land Company)
- The Japan Action Enterprise (JAE) - Formerly known as the Japan Action Club
- The Joint Action Club
- Ōno Kenyūkai (lit. The Swordsmanship Association)
- Red Entertainment Deliver Corporation - Formerly Known as The Red Action Club
- Tsuburaya Productions

There are many other companies beyond this list. Since suit actors often perform stunts, they are usually affiliated with companies that specialize in stunt actors and action stars.

== Related works ==
- Films
  - In the Hero (Japanese: イン・ザ・ヒーロー, Hepburn: In Za Hīrō) – A documentary starring former suit actor Toshiaki Karasawa.
- Television
  - The Ultraseven Who I Loved (Japanese: 私が愛したウルトラセブン, Hepburn: Watashi ga Aishita Urutora Sebun) – A dramatization of the behind-the-scenes production of Ultraseven
  - The Man Who Dreamed of Becoming Ultraman (Japanese: ウルトラマンになりたかった男, Hepburn: Urutoraman Ni Naritakatta Otoko) - A dramatization of the Ultra Series' production
- Manga
  - The Men Who Made Kamen Rider (Japanese: 仮面ライダーをつくった男たち, Hepburn: Kamen Raidā wo tsukutta Otokotachi) – The nonfiction manga about the history of Kamen Rider. Features Ōno Kenyūkai as a subject.
  - Stuffed Gilman! (Japanese: ヌイグルメン!, Hepburn: Nui Gurumen!) – Written by Nawoki Karasawa. A fictionalized depiction of the behind-the-scenes production of a tokusatsu production with a suit actor as the main protagonist.

== See also ==
- Tokusatsu
- Stunt performer
- Creature suit
