= Yasuhiko Imai =

Yasuhiko Imai (今井 靖彦, Imai Yasuhiko) (born November 22, 1965) is a Japanese stunt man and suit actor affiliated with Japan Action Enterprises. He has been cast mainly in the Super Sentai series.

== Stunt/Suit Actor Roles ==
=== Super Sentai Series ===
- Hikari Sentai Maskman (1987–1988) - Black Mask
- Choujuu Sentai Liveman (1988–1989) - Green Sai
- Choujin Sentai Jetman (1991–1992) - Black Condor
- Kyoryu Sentai Zyuranger (1992–1993) - Mammoth Ranger
- Chōriki Sentai Ohranger (1995–1996) - Oh Green (sub), Green Blocker (sub)
- Kyuukyuu Sentai GoGoFive (1999–2000) - Go Blue (sub), Saima Beasts
- Mirai Sentai Timeranger (2000–2001) - Time Fire, Gien
- Hyakujuu Sentai Gaoranger (2001–2002) - Gao Blue
- Ninpuu Sentai Hurricaneger (2002–2003) - Kuwaga Raiger, Megatagame
- Bakuryuu Sentai Abaranger (2003–2004) - Abare Killer, Yatsudenwani
- Tokusou Sentai Dekaranger (2004–2005) - Deka Blue, Deka Wing Robo
- Mahou Sentai Magiranger (2005–2006) - Magi Yellow, Magi Garuda, Legend Magi Yellow
- GoGo Sentai Boukenger (2006–2007) - Bouken Black
- Juken Sentai Gekiranger (2007–2008) - Black Lion Rio, Bion Biao
- Engine Sentai Go-onger (2008–2009) - Go-on Black
- Tensou Sentai Goseiger (2010–2011) - Gosei Black (sub)
- Kaizoku Sentai Gokaiger (2011–2012) - Action Commander, Black Lion Rio, Babatcheed
- Doubutsu Sentai Zyuohger (2016–2017) - Zyuoh Bird
- Uchu Sentai Kyuranger (2017–2018) - Sasori Orange

=== Kamen Rider Series ===
- Kamen Rider Gaim (2013–2014) - Kamen Rider Kurokage, Kamen Rider Bravo
- Kamen Rider Drive (2014–2015) - Kamen Rider Chaser, Mashin Chaser, Kamen Rider Protodrive
- Kamen Rider Revice (2021–2022) - Rex Deadman, True Gifftarian, Giff

=== Films ===
- Super Hero Taisen GP: Kamen Rider 3 (2015) - Kamen Rider Black, Mashin Chaser

== Non Suit Actor Roles ==
- Kamen Rider Den-O (2007–2008) - Contact Holder (episode 31)
- Hyakujuu Sentai Gaoranger (2001–2002) - Man in the background (episode 51)
- Ninpuu Sentai Hurricaneger (2002–2003) - Man in the background (episode 51)
