= Ayumi Kinoshita =

Japanese actress and voice actress (born 1982)

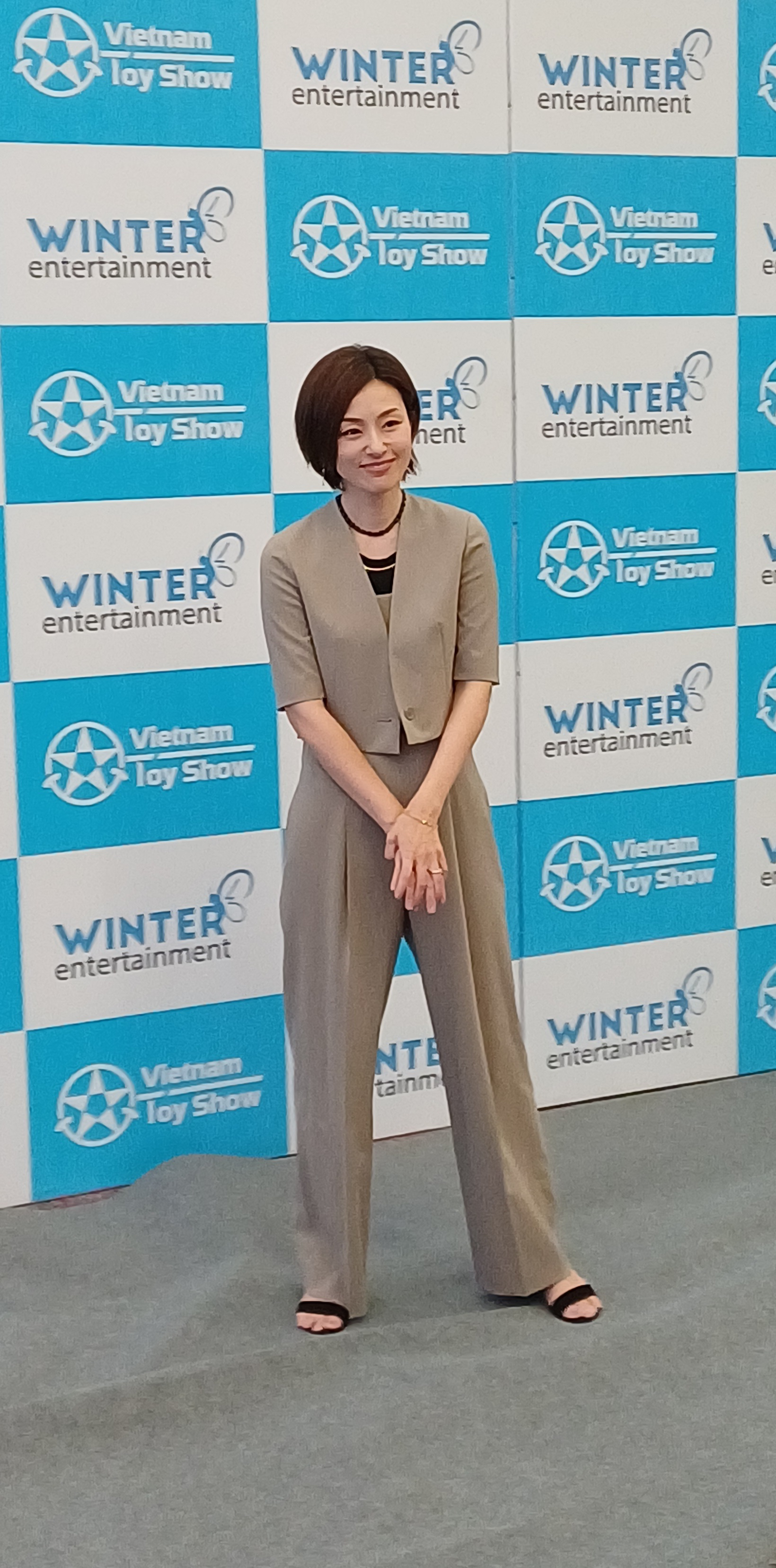
- Ayumi Kinoshita at a fan meeting event in Vietnam
- Born: December 13, 1982 (age 43); Chita, Aichi, Japan
- Education: Kinjo Gakuin University
- Years active: 2000–present
- Agent: Enno
- Children: 3
- Modeling information
- Height: 160 cm (5 ft 3 in)
- Hair color: Black
- Eye color: Black

Ayumi Kinoshita (木下 あゆ美, Kinoshita Ayumi; born December 13, 1982) is a Japanese actress. She was born in Chita, Aichi, Japan, and was affiliated with Wave Management Nagoya, Parts, Stardust Promotion and Enno before working as a freelance actress. She is well known for playing Marika Reimon (Jasmine)/Deka Yellow in the 2004 television series Tokusou Sentai Dekaranger. On February 27, 2014, she announced her pregnancy.

== Filmography ==
=== Television ===
Year	Title	Role	Notes
2001	R-17		
2004	Tokusou Sentai Dekaranger	Marika Reimon (Jasmine) / Deka Yellow	Main Role
2006	Uramiya Honpo	Uramiya	
2006	Kekkon Shiki he Ikou!	Makoto Kitazawa	
2008	Miracle Voice	Chizuru Takeuchi	
2008	Uramiya Honpo Special	Uramiya	
2008	Yu-Gi-Oh! 5D's	Aki Izayoi	Voice
2009	Uramiya Honpo Reboot	Uramiya	
2010	Huntik: Secrets & Seekers	Zhalia Moon	Entire series
2010	Face Maker	Aki Komatsu	Episode 12
2010	Kamen Rider W	Aya Kujo / Triceratops Dopant	Episodes 21 and 22
2011	Kaizoku Sentai Gokaiger	Marika Reimon	Episode: "Judgment Pirates"
2011	Power Rangers S.P.D.	Elizabeth "Z" Delgado	Voice, Japanese dub
2013	Zyuden Sentai Kyoryuger	Yuko Fukui / Kyoryu Cyan	
2023	Ohsama Sentai King-Ohger	Yuko Fukui	Episode 33

=== Film ===
Year	Title	Role	Notes
2004	Tokusou Sentai Dekaranger The Movie: Full Blast Action	Marika Reimon (Jasmine) / Deka Yellow	Short
2006	Tezuka Makoto no Horror Theater: The Birthday ~Unmei no Majin~ #7 "Kyōfu no Diet"	Manami	
2006	Cool Dimension	Mina Yazawa	
2006	Legend of Seven Monks	Ayumi	
2007	Makiguri no ana		
2008	Cursed Songs: Chi-Manako	Mari Iida	
2008	Peeping Tom	Narumi Asaka	
2010	Yu-Gi-Oh!: Bonds Beyond Time	Aki Izayoi	Voice
2010	Natural Woman	Keiko Sonoda	
2012	Kamen Rider Fourze the Movie: Everyone, Space Is Here!	Shizuka Shirayama / Skydain	
2012	My Way of Life	Rina Suzuki	
2013	Sengoku: Bloody Agent	Aika	
2013	Travelers: Jigen Keisatsu	Yui	
2013	Kamen Rider × Super Sentai × Space Sheriff: Super Hero Taisen Z	Skydain	Voice
2015	Ressha Sentai ToQger vs. Kyoryuger: The Movie	Kyoryu Cyan	Voice
2017	Kumo man		

=== Specials ===
Year	Title	Role	Notes
2003	Tokyo 23-ku-gai ~Owaranu~	Mayu Kuroki	
2004	Hime Vol.1 ~Aishisugiru Onna~	Reiko	
2005	Yūrei yori Kowai Hanashi Vol.3	Eri Hashiratani	
2005	Tokusou Sentai Dekaranger vs. Abaranger	Marika Reimon (Jasmine) / Deka Yellow	Lead Role
2005	Yoshitsune to Benkei	Shizuka Gozen	
2006	Mahou Sentai Magiranger vs. Dekaranger	Marika Reimon (Jasmine) / Deka Yellow	
2008	Yu-Gi-Oh! 5D's: Evolving Duel! Stardust Dragon Vs. Red Dragon Archfiend	Aki Izayoi	Voice
2015	Tokusou Sentai Dekaranger: 10 Years After	Marika Reimon (Jasmine) / Deka Yellow	
2017	Space Squad	Marika Reimon (Jasmine) / Deka Yellow	
2017	Girls in Trouble: Space Squad Episode Zero	Marika Reimon (Jasmine) / Deka Yellow	
2018	Hero Mama League	Marika Reimon (Jasmine) / Deka Yellow	
2024	Tokusou Sentai Dekaranger 20th: Fireball Booster	Marika Reimon (Jasmine) / Deka Yellow	
2024	Tokusou Sentai Dekaranger with Tombo Ohger	Marika Reimon (Jasmine) / Deka Yellow	

=== Idol videos ===
- Puro (2004)
- Collaboration Box (2004)
- Lettre (2005)
- La Dolce (2006)
