= Anonymous Noise =

Japanese manga series

- The cover of the first volume

覆面系ノイズ (Fukumenkei Noizu)
- Genre: Romance
- Manga
- Written by: Ryoko Fukuyama
- Published by: Hakusensha
- English publisher: NA: Viz Media
- Magazine: Hana to Yume
- Original run: 20 April 2013 – 5 January 2019
- Volumes: 18
- Anime television series
- Directed by: Hideya Takahashi
- Written by: Deko Akao
- Music by: Sadesper Record; NARASAKI / Watchman
- Studio: Brain's Base
- Licensed by: NA: Sentai Filmworks; UK: Anime Limited
- Original network: Tokyo MX, Kansai TV, BS Fuji
- English network: SEA: Animax Asia
- Original run: 11 April 2017 – 27 June 2017
- Episodes: 12
- icon

Anonymous Noise (Japanese: 覆面系ノイズ, Hepburn: Fukumenkei Noizu) is a Japanese manga series written and illustrated by Ryoko Fukuyama. The series is published by Hakusensha in Japan and by Viz Media in the United States. The manga has been adapted into an anime television series that aired from April to June 2017 and a live-action film.

== Characters ==
=== Main characters ===
In no hurry to shout

Nino Arisugawa (有栖川 仁乃, Arisugawa Nino) / Alice (ニノ)
Voiced by: Saori Hayami (drama CD, anime) (Japanese); Juliet Simmons (English)

Played by: Ayami Nakajo

Nino is a first-year high school student who has loved singing since young, being gifted with an extremely resonating voice. She was in love with her singing partner and neighbour Momo until he moved away suddenly, leading to the string of events that let her meet Kanade, whom she called Yuzu. After he leaves her too, she continues to sing for 6 years in hopes that her voice will reach them.
Kanade Yuzuriha (杠 花奏, Yuzuriha Kanade) / Yuzu (ユズ)
Voiced by: Miyuki Sawashiro (early drama CD), Rie Takahashi (child), Daiki Yamashita (anime) (Japanese); Bryson Baugus (English)
Played by: Jun Shison
Kanade is a second-year high school student who is known for drinking milk constantly. He nicknames Nino "Alice" from her surname. He initially had writer's block until he met Nino, whose voice reignites his feelings and passion to keep composing, forming a masked band known as "in NO hurry to shout". He has been in love with Nino for a long time now.
Yoshito Haruno (悠埜 佳斗, Haruno Yoshito) / Haruyoshi (ハルヨシ)
Voiced by: Daisuke Ono (drama CD, anime) (Japanese); Benjamin McLaughlin (English)
Played by: Yosuke Sugino
Ayumi Kurose (黒瀬 歩, Kurose Ayumi) / Kuro (クロ)
Voiced by: Kenichi Suzumura (early drama CD), Jun Fukuyama (anime) (Japanese); Blake Shepard (English)
Played by: Hayato Isomura

SILENT BLACK KITTY

Momo Sakaki (榊 桃, Sakaki Momo) / Momo (モモ)
Voiced by: Tomo Muranaka (child), Kōki Uchiyama (drama CD, anime) (Japanese); Houston Hayes (English)
Played by: Yuta Koseki
Momo is Nino's childhood friend who had to move away because of his parents' debt. He is a famous composer by the name of Momo Kiryuu.
Miou Suguri (珠久里 深桜, Suguri Miō) / Miou (ミオウ)
Voiced by: Ayahi Takagaki (drama CD, anime) (Japanese); Amanda Lee (English)
Played by: Erina Mano

=== Entertainment industry ===
Michiru Yanai (梁井壬散, Yanai Michiru) / Yana (ヤナ)
Voiced by: Daisuke Namikawa (Japanese); David Wald (English)
Tsukika Kuze (久瀬 月果, Kuze Tsukika)
Voiced by: Satomi Arai
Ayame Hōjō (北条 菖蒲, Hōjō Ayame)
Tomo-chan (トモちゃん)
Voiced by: M·A·O

=== Others ===
Nino's mother (仁乃の母, Nino no haha)
Voiced by: Yumi Kakazu (Japanese); Carli Mosier (English)
Yuzu's mother (ユズの母, Yuzu no haha)
Voiced by: Kikuko Inoue (Japanese); Joanne Bonasso (English)
Momo's mother (モモの母, Momo no haha)
Voiced by: Emi Shinohara
Eiji Mikota (三古田瑛士, Mikota Eiji)
Voiced by: Tatsuhisa Suzuki, Satomi Akesaka (child) (Japanese); Greg Cote, Carli Mosier (child) (English)

== Media ==
=== Manga and drama CD ===
Ryoko Fukuyama launched the series in the 10th issue of Hakusensha's shōjo manga magazine Hana to Yume on 20 April 2013. The manga ended on 5 January 2019. A drama CD was bundled with the 7th issue of Hana to Yume released on 5 March 2014. Fukuyama mentioned that the cast of the drama CD was based on her own recommendation, with most of the cast reprising their roles in the anime adaptation. North American publisher Viz Media announced their license to the series on 2 October 2016. The limited edition of volume 13 was bundled with drama CD.

==== Volumes ====
No.	Original release date	Original ISBN	English release date	English ISBN
1	18 October 2013	9784592213017	7 March 2017	9781421594200
2	20 February 2014	9784592213024	2 May 2017	9781421594217
3	20 June 2014	9784592213031	4 July 2017	9781421594224
4	20 October 2014	9784592213048	5 September 2017	9781421594231
5	20 January 2015	9784592213055	28 November 2017	9781421594248
6	17 July 2015	9784592213062	2 January 2018	9781421594255
7	20 October 2015	9784592213079	6 March 2018	9781421594262
8	20 January 2016	9784592213086	1 May 2018	9781421594279
9	20 April 2016	9784592213093	3 July 2018	9781421594286
10	19 August 2016	9784592213109	4 September 2018	9781421594293
11	20 December 2016	9784592216117	6 November 2018	9781421597737
12	20 March 2017	9784592216124	1 January 2019	9781421598277
13	20 June 2017	9784592216131	5 March 2019	9781974700264
14	20 November 2017	9784592216148	7 May 2019	9781974705535
15	20 March 2018	9784592216155	2 July 2019	9781974706426
16	20 August 2018	9784592216162	3 September 2019	9781974707119
17	19 December 2018	9784592216179	5 November 2019	9781974709533
18	20 March 2019	9784592216186	7 January 2020	9781974710782

=== Anime ===
An anime television series adaptation was announced via the cover of the 10th issue of Hana to Yume in April 2016 and aired from 11 April 2017 to 27 June 2017, on Tokyo MX, Kansai TV, and BS Fuji The anime is licensed by Sentai Filmworks in North America for streaming and home video release that held a world premiere screening of the first episode at Anime Boston on 1 April 2017 ahead of its release in Japan. Prior to the anime, an internet radio show to promote the series titled Fukumenkei Noise in NO hurry to Radio (覆面系ノイズ in NO hurry to Radio;) began broadcasting on 8 April 2017. The show is hosted by Saori Hayami and Daiki Yamashita, the voice actors for Nino and Yuzu, respectively.

No.	Title	Original release date
1	"We're Hiding How We Truly Feel" "Bokutachi wa, Honto no Kokoro o, Kakushiteru" (Japanese: ぼくたちは、ほんとのこころを、かくしてる)	11 April 2017
2	"God, I Pray That Alice's Love Will Never Be Realized" "Kamisama, Arisu no Koi ga, Eien ni Kanaimasen Yō ni" (Japanese: かみさま、アリスのこいが、えいえんにかないませんように)	18 April 2017
3	"Whatever It Takes, Right Now" "Dōshite mo, Ima Sugu" (Japanese: どうしても、いますぐ)	25 April 2017
4	"That Day, We Who Were Hiding How We Truly Felt Joined Hands" "Honto no Kokoro o Kaku Shita Bokura wa, Kōshite Ano Hi, Te o Kundanda" (Japanese: ほんとのこころをかくしたぼくらは、こうしてあのひ、てをくんだんだ)	2 May 2017
5	"I Wouldn't Have Had to See You Smile Like That" "Kimi no Anna Egao, Minakute Sunda noni" (Japanese: きみのあんな笑顔、みなくてすんだのに)	9 May 2017
6	"Today And Tomorrow, We Walk" "Kyō mo Ashita mo, Aruku" (Japanese: 今日も明日も、歩く)	16 May 2017
7	"Our Lines of Sight Finally Overlapped" "Bokura no Shisen wa Yōyaku, Kōsa Shitanda" (Japanese: ぼくらの視線はようやく、交差したんだ)	23 May 2017
8	"I Will Be Your Friend, I Swear I Will" "Kimi no Tomodachi ni Naru tte, Zettai, Natte Miseru tte" (Japanese: きみのともだちになるって、ぜったい、なってみせるって)	30 May 2017
9	"And So, We Took Off Running For That Summer" "Sōshite, Bokura wa Hashiridashita, Ano Natsu o Mezashite" (Japanese: そうして、ぼくらははしりだした、あの夏をめざして)	6 June 2017
10	"The One Who Lit a Fire Inside Alice Was Me" "Arisu ni Hi o Tsuketa no wa, Boku Datta" (Japanese: アリスに火をつけたのは、ぼくだった)	13 June 2017
11	"I'll Make It So All of Them Can Never Leave" "Zenin Koko kara, Hanare Nare Naku Shiteyaru" (Japanese: 全員ここから、離れなれなくしてやる)	20 June 2017
12	"I Pray It Reaches You" "Todokimasu Yō ni" (Japanese: とどきますように)	27 June 2017

=== Music ===
For the anime television series, six singles were released starting on 19 April 2017. The first single included the anime opening theme "High School" (ハイスクール) [ANIME SIDE] -Bootleg- by in NO hurry to shout; (vocal: Miou, voiced by Ayahi Takagaki), and insert song "Spiral" (スパイラル) by in NO hurry to shout; (vocal: Nino, voiced by Saori Hayami). The second single included the anime opening theme "High School" with Nino's vocal titled "High School" (ハイスクール) [ANIME SIDE] -Alternative- by in NO hurry to shout; (vocal: Nino, voiced by Saori Hayami) and was released together with third single on 10 May 2017 that included the anime ending theme "Allegro" (アレグロ) by in NO hurry to shout; (vocal: Nino, voiced by Saori Hayami). The fourth single included the insert song "Canary" (カナリヤ, Kanariya) [ANIME SIDE] by in NO hurry to shout; (vocal: Nino, voiced by Saori Hayami) was released on 17 May 2017. The fifth single was released on 14 June 2017 and included the insert song "Falling Silent" by Silent Black Kitty (vocal: Miou, voiced by Ayahi Takagaki). The sixth single of the anime "Noise" (ノイズ) by in NO hurry to shout; (vocal: Nino, voiced by Saori Hayami) was released on 21 June 2017. Anonymous Noise anime original soundtrack was released on 28 June 2017 and contains 57 tracks by SADESPER RECORD (NARASAKI / WATCHMAN) and included "Etude" (エチュード), a song played by Yuzu on piano and sung by Nino in the first episode and its piano score.

=== Live-action film ===
A live-action film adaptation was announced via the 21st issue of Hana to Yume in October 2016. Koichiro Miki directed the film; he and Rie Yokota had written the scripts. Principal photography began in November 2016. The film was released on 25 November 2017 in Japan.

== See also ==
- Koi ni Mudaguchi — Another manga series by the same author
