= Devon's Ghost: Legend of the Bloody Boy =

- Directed by: Johnny Yong Bosch; Koichi Sakamoto
- Written by: Karan Ashley; Ron Day; Tim Grace
- Starring: Johnny Yong Bosch; Reza Bahador; Karan Ashley; Matt Moore; Jonathan Cruz
- Release date: 2005
- Running time: 90 minutes
- Country: United States
- Language: English

Devon's Ghost: Legend of the Bloody Boy is a 2005 independent action-horror film starring Power Rangers alumni Johnny Yong Bosch and Karan Ashley. The film is directed by Koichi Sakamoto and Johnny Yong Bosch. It is about a town haunted by a boy's ghost that turns into a bloody terror. The UK Film DVD release was re-titled Sawed.

== Synopsis ==
Plagued by a ten-year-old legendary story of the mysterious murder of Devon Anderson, this community still harbors curiosity when the current victims and the evidence surrounding their murders appears to be very similar to what happened to Devon and the parents accused of murdering him. Did Devon Anderson die? That is the question. How did Devon's lovestruck, deranged, abusive parents get off for his murder when all the evidence pointed to them? And who killed them in turn?

This legendary event causes strife in the tiny city, but also leaves a trail of questions and enough obscurity to keep a community still scared, obsessed by the tragic event and concerned that it is happening again. With more people dying and all the similarities mounting, the legend of Devon's ghost has surfaced and sent an already suspicious community into a tailspin.

Convinced that Devon Anderson is alive and the murderer, Josh and Symphony, along with their friends, stay one step ahead of the authorities and try to find Devon, to stop him from killing again. Not really knowing what is setting the guy off, they narrow down that every couple was attacked while being affectionate. They have to do something quick, before they too become victims. With the police and the media just assuming it's a copycat crime, they must face Devon alone and re-open old emotional wounds, and hunt down their once-classmate. But Devon is much too smart and too strong, and running is not an option. The only way to get Devon is to fight back together.

== Cast ==
- Karan Ashley ... Symphony
- Johnny Yong Bosch ... Josh
- Reza Bahador ... Devon
- Jonny Cruz ... Craig (as Jonathan Cruz)
- Matt Moore ... Freedom
- Kristy Vaughan ... Genesis
- Neill Skylar ... Fatima (as Neill McClung)
- Donny Boaz ... Scott
- Adrian Green ... Jermaine/Devon Double
- Kristin Hayes ... Kelly
- Kevin Dewitt ... Brian
- Geneva Olivarez ... Bianca
- Aleisha Force ... Joy Walker
- Joel S. Greco ... Gary Walker
- Paul Taylor

== Crew ==
- Johnny Yong Bosch and Koichi Sakamoto - directors
- Cody Westheimer - music
- Karan Ashley, Ron Day, and Tim Grace - writers
