= Yui Oguri =

- 小栗 有以
- Oguri in 2019
- Born: December 26, 2001 (age 24); Tokyo, Japan
- Occupations: Singer; Actress
- Years active: 2014–present
- Agent: Zest
- Musical career
- Genre: J-pop
- Instrument: Vocals
- Member of: AKB48
- Website: Official website

Yui Oguri (小栗 有以, Oguri Yui; born December 26, 2001) is a Japanese singer and actress. She has been a member of the idol group AKB48 since 2014.

== Career ==
=== AKB48 ===
Oguri began her activities as a member of AKB48 Team 8 in 2014, representing Tokyo.

In 2018, she became the center of AKB48's 52nd single "Teacher Teacher", her first time in the center position.

She later served as center for the group's 62nd single "Idol Nanka Janakattara" in 2023. In 2025, she was the center of the group's 66th single "Oh My Pumpkin!", marking her third time in the position.

=== Acting career ===
In 2018, Oguri starred in the Nippon Television series Majimuri Gakuen, playing Shimizu Sayuri, also known as Lily.

In 2022, she played Ema Kanō, the heroine of the television drama Koi ni Mudaguchi. She also appeared in the television drama Kyōso no Musume (教祖のムスメ) as Miyu Kurosawa.

In 2023, Oguri co-starred as Minami Koharu in the youth road movie Girls Drive, alongside fellow AKB48 members Mizuki Yamauchi, Narumi Kuranoo, and Sora Yamazaki. The same year, she played Akane Yuzuki in the action film Good Morning, Sleeping Lion 2.

In 2025, she starred as Haruka Hara in the horror film 2025年7月5日午前4時18分.

== Filmography ==
=== Screen appearances ===
Year	Title	Role	Notes	Ref.
2018	Majimuri Gakuen (マジムリ学園)	Lily / Shimizu Sayuri (リリィー / 清水小百合)	Lead; television series	
2022	Koi ni Mudaguchi (恋に無駄口)	Ema Kanō (叶依麻)	Heroine; television series	
2022	Kyōso no Musume (教祖のムスメ)	Miyu Kurosawa (黒沢美優)	Television series	
2023	Girls Drive (ガールズドライブ)	Minami Koharu (南小春)	One of the leads; film	
2023	Good Morning, Sleeping Lion 2 (グッドモーニング、眠れる獅子2)	Akane Yuzuki (柚木朱音)	Heroine; action film	
2025	2025年7月5日午前4時18分	Haruka Hara (原ハルカ)	Lead; horror film	
