= Koichi Sakamoto =

Japanese-born stunt actor and producer (born 1970)

- 坂本 浩一
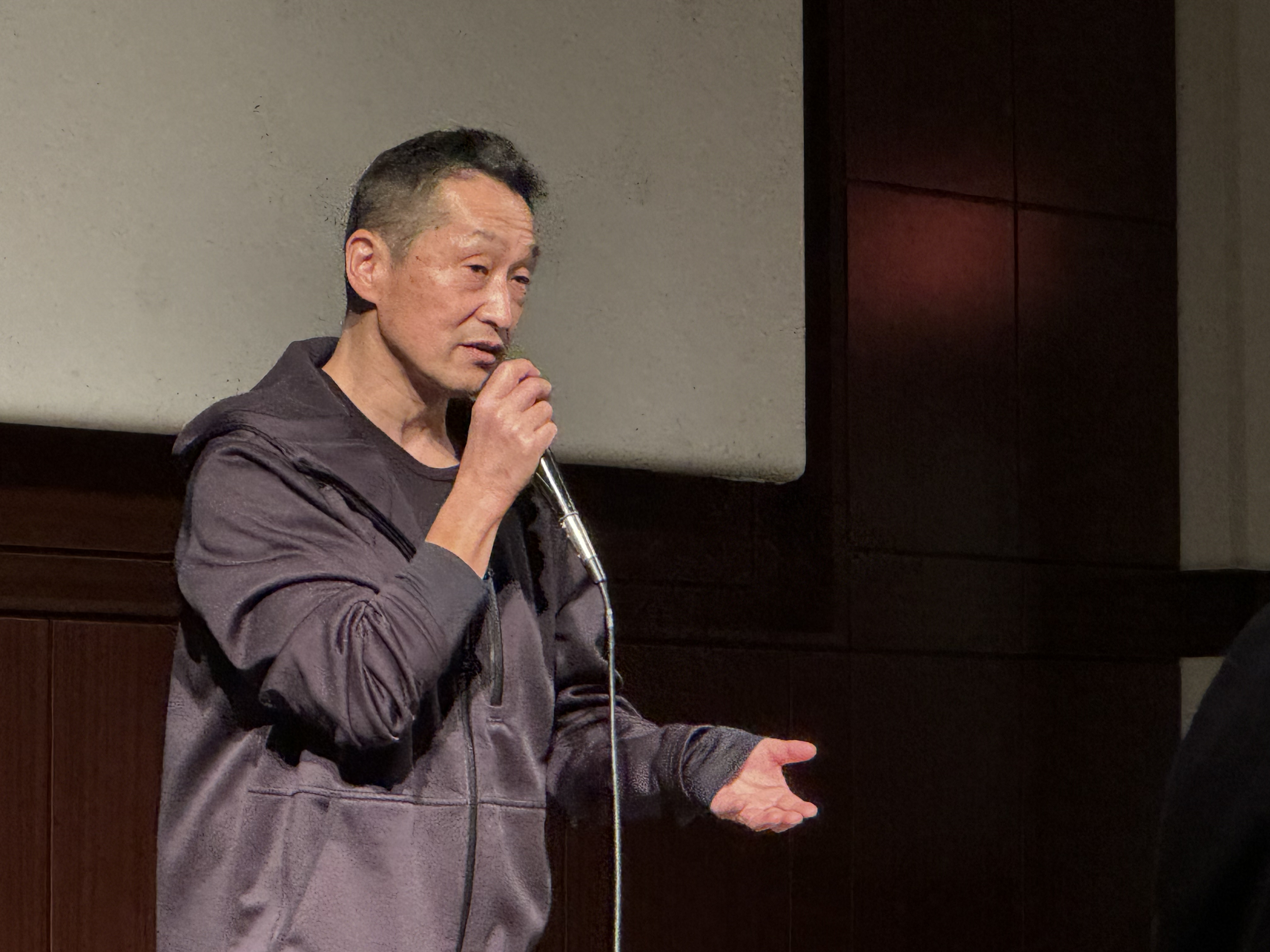
- Sakamoto in 2023
- Born: Tokyo, Japan
- Occupations: Director; producer; stunt performer; stunt coordinator; fight choreographer
- Years active: 1991—present

Koichi Sakamoto (Japanese: 坂本 浩一, Hepburn: Sakamoto Kōichi) is a Japanese and American film and television director, stunt performer and coordinator, fight choreographer and producer. He is best known for his work in the tokusatsu genre, particularly for the Super Sentai, Power Rangers and Kamen Rider franchises.

== Biography ==
=== Early life and career ===
Sakamoto was born in Tokyo in 1970. As a child, he was a fan of early tokusatsu shows, which led him to take an interest in martial arts. In 1979, he saw the Jackie Chan film Drunken Master, which led him to take a particular interest in kung fu and gymnastics, though he did not get to learn kung fu until he was older.

Sakamoto graduated from Higashiayase junior high and high school in Adachi, Tokyo, and went on to graduate from Matsudo Senshu University. Sakamoto studied under Yasuaki Kurata, and worked to become a stunt performer for Blue Mask on Hikari Sentai Maskman at live stunt shows, performing at Kōrakuen Stadium and Tokyo Dome.

He came to the United States in 1989 as a foreign student to learn English and became a stunt actor.

His first major stunt role was in 1994 with Guyver: Dark Hero as "Sakai." Sakamoto eventually married the film's unit production manager with whom he had one daughter prior to their separating. He went on to marry stuntwoman and suit actor Motoko Nagino in 2002.

=== Power Rangers ===
Sakamoto had also formed Alpha Stunts Production and was enlisted as 2nd Unit Director for the "battle grid" scenes from Saban Entertainment syndicated live-action children's series VR Troopers. This led him to eventually replacing Jeff Pruitt as stunt coordinator for the third season of Mighty Morphin Power Rangers, along with his Alpha Stunts team. Sakamoto would then go on to become the 2nd Unit Director for the remainder of the Saban-era Power Rangers series, eventually filling the role of Producer, even completing the final storyboard for "Countdown to Destruction", the two-part series finale episode of Power Rangers in Space (originally drafted to be three episodes).

Sakamoto became one of the few original crew members from MMPR Productions to remain with the production following its move to New Zealand in 2003 when the franchise was transferred from Saban Entertainment to Disney. Sakamoto was replaced as stunt coordinator by Mark Harris, although continued directing through Ninja Storm and thereafter stayed on as executive producer, no longer choreographing or directing. Disney stopped producing new seasons following Power Rangers RPM, eventually selling the franchise to Saban Brands in 2010.

=== Other works ===
In 2006, Sakamoto served as action unit director and choreographer in Wendy Wu: Homecoming Warrior He trained The Jonas Brothers for a week and a half in preparation for filming J.O.N.A.S.

In 2008, Sakamoto and the Alpha Stunts team provided stunt training for the reality TV series Tankboy TV.

After leaving Power Rangers, Sakamoto went to Japan to direct 2010's Mega Monster Battle: Ultra Galaxy Legend, which led to a new career directing tokusatsu TV shows and films for Toei and Tsuburaya, including Kaizoku Sentai Gokaiger, Zyuden Sentai Kyoryuger, Kamen Rider Fourze, Kamen Rider × Kamen Rider Fourze & OOO: Movie War Mega Max, Kamen Rider W Forever: A to Z/The Gaia Memories of Fate, Mega Monster Battle: Ultra Galaxy and Travelers: Jigen Keisatsu. Sakamoto is known for adding elements of Hong Kong-style martial arts and stunts into traditional tokusatsu weapons battles and effects. Sakamoto has also made a guest appearance in Season 2 of Unofficial Sentai Akibaranger.

== Filmography ==
- series director denoted in bold

=== Television ===
- Power Rangers Zeo (1996)
- Power Rangers Turbo (1997)
- Power Rangers in Space (1998)
- Power Rangers Lost Galaxy (1999)
- Power Rangers Lightspeed Rescue (2000)
- **Power Rangers Time Force** (2001)
- **Power Rangers Wild Force** (2002)
- **Power Rangers Ninja Storm** (2003)
- Kamen Rider W (2010)
- Kaizoku Sentai Gokaiger (2011)
- **Kamen Rider Fourze** (2011-2012)
- **Zyuden Sentai Kyoryuger** (2013-2014)
- **Ultraman Ginga S** (2014)
- **Ultra Fight Victory** (2015)
- **Gunblade** (2015)
- Ultraman X (2015)
- Kamen Rider Ghost (2015-2016)
- Kamen Rider Ex-Aid (2016)
- **Ultra Fight Orb** (2017)
- **Power Rangers Dino Force Brave** (2017)
- **Ultraman Geed** (2017)
- **Mob Psycho 100** (2018)
- Kamen Rider Zi-O (2018)
- **Super Sentai Strongest Battle** (2019)
- Kishiryu Sentai Ryusoulger (2019)
- Ultra Galaxy Fight (2019–present)
  - Ultra Galaxy Fight: New Generation Heroes (2019)
  - Ultra Galaxy Fight: The Absolute Conspiracy (2020)
  - Ultra Galaxy Fight: The Destined Crossroad (2021)
- Mashin Sentai Kiramager (2020)
- **Sedai Wars** (2020)
- Ultraman Z (2020)
- Kamen Rider Saber (2020-2021)
- **Ultraman Trigger: New Generation Tiga** (2021-2022)
- Kamen Rider Revice (2021–2022)
- Ultraman Decker (2022)
- Pop Team Epic Season 2: Endless Love (2022)
- Kamen Rider Geats (2022–2023)
- Ohsama Sentai King-Ohger (2023-2024)
- Kamen Rider Gotchard (2024)
- **Wing-Man** (2024)
- No.1 Sentai Gozyuger (2025-2026)

=== Film ===
- Wicked Game (2002)
- Devon's Ghost: Legend of the Bloody Boy (2007)
- Broken Path (2008)
- Mega Monster Battle: Ultra Galaxy (2009)
- Kamen Rider W Forever: A to Z/The Gaia Memories of Fate (2010)
- Kamen Rider W Returns (2011)
- Kamen Rider × Kamen Rider Fourze & OOO: Movie War Mega Max (2011)
- Kamen Rider Fourze the Movie: Space, Here We Come! (2012)
- Kamen Rider × Kamen Rider Wizard & Fourze: Movie War Ultimatum (2012)
- Travelers: Jigen Keisatsu (2013)
- 009-1: The End of the Beginning (2013)
- Innocent Lilies (2013)
- Zyuden Sentai Kyoryuger: Gaburincho of Music (2013)
- Zyuden Sentai Kyoryuger vs. Go-Busters: The Great Dinosaur Battle! Farewell Our Eternal Friends (2014)
- Girl's Blood (2014)
- We’re the Bounty Hunter Troupe (2014)
- Space Sheriff Next Generation (2014)
  - Uchu Keiji Sharivan Next Generation
  - Uchu Keiji Shaider Next Generation
- Ultraman Ginga S The Movie (2015)
- KIRI - Profession: Assassin (2015)
- Kamen Rider Heisei Generations: Dr. Pac-Man vs. Ex-Aid & Ghost with Legend Rider (2016)
- Hurricane Polymar (2017)
- Space Squad (2017)
- Uchu Sentai Kyuranger: Episode of Stinger (2017)
- From Episode of Stinger: Uchu Sentai Kyuranger High School Wars (2017)
- Uchu Sentai Kyuranger vs. Space Squad (2018)
- Ultraman Geed The Movie (2018)
- BLACKFOX: Age of the Ninja (2019)
- Mashin Sentai Kiramager vs. Ryusoulger (2021)
- Bungo Stray Dogs The Movie: Beast (2022)
- Good Morning, Sleeping Lion (2022)
- Revice Forward: Kamen Rider Live & Evil & Demons (2023)
- Good Morning, Sleeping Lion 2 (2023)
- Kamen Rider Geats: Jyamato Awaking (2024)
- Ohsama Sentai King-Ohger vs. Kyoryuger (2024)

== Writer ==
- Power Rangers in Space (1998)
- Amara que linda (2017)

== Actor ==
- Unofficial Sentai Akibaranger (2012) as George Spielburton
