= Seiji Takaiwa =

Japanese actor

- 高岩 成二
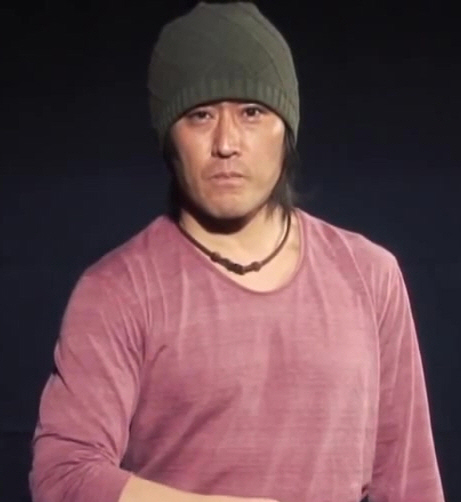
- Seiji Takaiwa in 2014
- Born: November 3, 1968 (age 57)
- Occupations: Suit actor; stunt performer; actor
- Years active: 1992–present

Seiji Takaiwa (Japanese: 高岩 成二, Hepburn: Takaiwa Seiji; born November 3, 1968) is a Japanese stunt performer and suit actor from Saitama Prefecture. He has been cast in many leading roles in the Super Sentai and Kamen Rider series, portraying a diverse range of characters.

Takaiwa began his career with the Japan Action Club stunt agency when he was a high school student, and currently belongs to his own stunt performance agency, Team T.A.W (Takaiwa Action Widen). He is married to retired stunt performer and suit actress Rie Murakami, who is also the director of Team T.A.W. Their second son Shinta is also a stunt performer.

== Stunt/suit actor appearances ==
=== Super Sentai Series ===
Year	Title	Role	Other notes
1992	Kyōryū Sentai Zyuranger	DragonRanger	At the end
1994	Ninja Sentai Kakuranger	Ninja Red, Red Saruder, Battle Saruder, God Saruder, Kakure Daishogun, NinjaMan	
1994	Ninja Sentai Kakuranger the Movie	Ninja Red	
1994	Super Sentai World	Ninja Red	
1996	Chōriki Sentai Ohranger: Ohra VS Kakuranger	Ninja Red	
1997	Denji Sentai Megaranger	Mega Blue, Delta Mega	
1998	Denji Sentai Megaranger VS Carranger	Mega Blue	
1998	Seijuu Sentai Gingaman	Ginga Red, Ginga Leon, BullTaurus	
1999	Seijuu Sentai Gingaman VS Megaranger	Ginga Red, Mega Blue, BullTaurus	
1999	Kyuukyuu Sentai GoGo-V	Go Red, Salamandes, Zylpheeza	
1999	Kyuukyuu Sentai GoGoFive the Movie: Sudden Shock! A New Warrior	Go Red, Zylpheeza	
2000	Kyuukyuu Sentai GoGoFive VS Gingaman	Go Red, Ginga Red, Salamandes, BullTaurus	
2000	Mirai Sentai Timeranger	Time Red, V-Rex	
2001	Mirai Sentai Timeranger VS GoGoFive	Time Red, Go Red, V-Rex	
2005	Mahou Sentai Magiranger	Magi Red, Magi Phoenix	
2005	Mahou Sentai Magiranger the Movie: Bride of Infershia ~Maagi Magi Giruma Jinga~	Magi Red	
2006	Mahou Sentai Magiranger: Revealed! The Gold Grip Phone's Super Magic ~Golu Goolu Goo Goo~	Magi Red, Kai Shine	
2006	Mahou Sentai Magiranger VS Dekaranger ~Maagi Giruma Deka Magika~	Magi Red	
2006	GoGo Sentai Boukenger	Bouken Black (sub)	
2011	Kaizoku Sentai Gokaiger	Ninja Red	
2011	Gokaiger Goseiger Super Sentai 199 Hero Great Battle		
2015	Shuriken Sentai Ninninger	Ninja Red	

=== Kamen Rider Series ===
Year	Title	Role	Other notes
1989	Kamen Rider Black RX	Riderman	Episodes 41-47
1993	Kamen Rider ZO	Doras	
2001	Kamen Rider Agito	Kamen Rider Agito	
2001	Kamen Rider Agito: Project G4	Kamen Rider Agito	
2002	Kamen Rider Ryuki	Kamen Rider Ryuki	
2002	Kamen Rider Ryuki: 13 Riders	Kamen Rider Ryuki, Kamen Rider Knight (As part of Shinji's transformation sequence), Kamen Rider Ryuga	
2002	Kamen Rider Ryuki: Episode Final	Kamen Rider Ryuki, Kamen Rider Ryuga (Against Ouja)	
2003	Kamen Rider 555	Kamen Rider Faiz, Wolf Orphnoch, Centipede Orphnoch (Ep. 14 & 15), Worm Orphnoch, Horse Orphnoch, Kamen Rider Kaixa (Ep. 21 & 22), Kamen Rider Delta (Ep.38)	
2003	Kamen Rider 555: Paradise Lost	Kamen Rider Faiz, Wolf Orphnoch, Kamen Rider Kaixa (As part of Keitaro's transformation sequence)	
2004	Kamen Rider Blade	Kamen Rider Blade, Joker	
2004	Kamen Rider Blade: Missing Ace	Kamen Rider Blade, Beetle Undead, Squid Undead, AlbiRoaches	
2006	Kamen Rider Kabuto	Kamen Rider Kabuto, Kamen Rider Dark Kabuto, ZECTroopers	
2006	Kamen Rider Kabuto: God Speed Love	Kamen Rider Kabuto	
2007	Kamen Rider Den-O	Kamen Rider Den-O, Momotaros	
2007	Kamen Rider Den-O: I'm Born!	Kamen Rider Den-O, Momotaros	
2008	Kamen Rider Kiva	Kamen Rider Kiva, Garulu, Kamen Rider Dark Kiva	
2008	Kamen Rider Den-O & Kiva: Climax Deka	Kamen Rider Den-O, Kamen Rider Kiva, Momotaros	
2008	Kamen Rider Kiva: King of the Castle in the Demon World	Kamen Rider Kiva, Garulu	
2008	Saraba Kamen Rider Den-O: Final Countdown	Kamen Rider Den-O Sword Form, Momotaros, Kamen Rider NEW Den-O	
2009	Kamen Rider Decade	Kamen Rider Decade, Kamen Rider Den-O Sword Form, Momotaros	
2009	Kamen Rider G	Kamen Rider Decade	
2009	Cho Kamen Rider Den-O & Decade Neo Generations: The Onigashima Warship	Kamen Rider Den-O, Momotaros, Kamen Rider Decade	
2009	Kamen Rider Decade: All Riders vs. Dai-Shocker	Kamen Rider Decade, Kamen Rider Double, Kamen Rider Den-O, Momotaros, Riderman, Kamen Rider X, Skyrider	
2009	Kamen Rider W	Kamen Rider Double, Kamen Rider Joker	
2009	Kamen Rider × Kamen Rider W & Decade: Movie War 2010	Kamen Rider Double, Kamen Rider Decade	
2010	Kamen Rider × Kamen Rider × Kamen Rider The Movie: Cho-Den-O Trilogy	Kamen Rider Den-O, Momotaros, Kamen Rider NEW Den-O	
2010	Kamen Rider W Forever: A to Z/The Gaia Memories of Fate	Kamen Rider Double, Kamen Rider Joker, Kamen Rider OOO	
2010	Kamen Rider OOO	Kamen Rider OOO	
2010	Kamen Rider × Kamen Rider OOO & W Featuring Skull: Movie War Core	Kamen Rider OOO, Kamen Rider Double	
2011	OOO, Den-O, All Riders: Let's Go Kamen Riders	Kamen Rider OOO, Kamen Rider Den-O, Momotaros	
2011	Kamen Rider W Returns	Kamen Rider Double	
2011	Kamen Rider OOO Wonderful: The Shogun and the 21 Core Medals	Kamen Rider OOO, Kamen Rider Fourze, Kamen Rider Birth (Eiji Hino)	
2011	Kamen Rider Fourze	Kamen Rider Fourze	
2011	Kamen Rider × Kamen Rider Fourze & OOO: Movie War Mega Max	Kamen Rider OOO, Kamen Rider Fourze, Kamen Rider Double, Kamen Rider Joker	
2012	Kamen Rider × Super Sentai: Super Hero Taisen	Kamen Rider Fourze, Kamen Rider OOO, Momotaros	
2012	Kamen Rider Fourze the Movie: Everyone, Space Is Here!	Kamen Rider Fourze, Kamen Rider Wizard	
2012	Kamen Rider Wizard	Kamen Rider Wizard	
2012	Kamen Rider × Kamen Rider Wizard & Fourze: Movie War Ultimatum	Kamen Rider Wizard, Kamen Rider Fourze	
2013	Kamen Rider × Super Sentai × Space Sheriff: Super Hero Taisen Z	Kamen Rider Wizard	
2013	Kamen Rider Wizard in Magic Land	Kamen Rider Wizard	
2013	Kamen Rider Gaim	Kamen Rider Gaim	
2013	Kamen Rider × Kamen Rider Gaim & Wizard: The Fateful Sengoku Movie Battle	Kamen Rider Gaim	
2014	Heisei Riders vs. Shōwa Riders: Kamen Rider Taisen feat. Super Sentai	Kamen Rider Gaim	
2014	Kamen Rider Drive	Kamen Rider Drive	
2015	Kamen Rider Ghost	Kamen Rider Ghost	
2016	Kamen Rider Ex-Aid	Kamen Rider Ex-Aid	
2017	Kamen Rider Build	Kamen Rider Build	
2018	Kamen Rider Zi-O	Kamen Rider Zi-O	
2019	Kamen Rider Zero-One	Kamen Rider Horobi	

=== Metal Hero Series ===
Year	Title	Role	Other notes
1993	Tokusou Robo Janperson	Janperson (Action scenes), Guild Satsujin Robot	
1994	Toei Hero Daishugō	Ninja Red, Janperson (Action scenes)	
1995	Juukou B-Fighter	Blue Beet	(Action scenes)
1996	B-Fighter Kabuto	B-Fighter Kabuto (Action scenes), B-Fighter Yanma, B-Fighter Genji	

=== Others ===
Year	Title
1988	Dennou Keisatsu Cybercop

== Non-suit actor appearances ==
Year	Title	Role	Other notes
1991	Tokkyuu Shirei Solbrain	Chinpira	Episode 17
1992	Tokusou Exceedraft	Bodyguard (ep.17), Houseki Goutou (ep.39)	
1996	B-Fighter Kabuto	Julio Rivera/B-Fighter Genji	
2002	Kamen Rider Ryuki VS Kamen Rider Agito	Kamen Rider Agito	Voice role
2004	Kamen Rider Blade: Missing Ace	Security guard	Cameo
2008	Kamen Rider Kiva: King of the Castle in the Demon World	Policeman	Cameo
2009	Net Edition Kamen Rider Decade: All Riders Super Spin-off	Himself	
2012	Kamen Rider Fourze the Net Edition: Everyone, Let's Go to Class!	Himself	
2013	Unofficial Sentai Akibaranger	Himself	Episode 8
2014	Heisei Riders vs. Shōwa Riders: Kamen Rider Taisen feat. Super Sentai	Worker	
2015	Kamen Rider Ghost	Guard (ep. 3), Gyro	
2019	Rider Time: Kamen Rider Ryuki	Biker	Cameo
2022	Good Morning, Sleeping Lion	Kazuma Kujō	Lead role
2023	Good Morning, Sleeping Lion 2	Kazuma Kujō	Lead role
