= Kazuo Niibori =

Kazuo Niibori 新堀和男
- Born: February 23, 1955 (age 71); Ibaraki Prefecture, Japan
- Occupation: Actor
- Years active: 1971-present

Kazuo Niibori (新堀 和男, Nībori Kazuo; born February 23, 1955), is a Japanese stunt actor and action director best known for his career as the suit actor for the first 14 red warriors in the Super Sentai series, excluding Spade Ace from the 2nd installment of Super Sentai, J.A.K.Q. Dengekitai. He is the president of his own action/stunt troupe called Red Entertainment Deliver (レッド・エンタテインメント・デリヴァー, Reddo Entateinmento Derivā).

== Filmography ==
=== Action director ===
==== TV Drama ====
- Kyōryū Sentai Zyuranger (1992)
- Blue SWAT (1994)
- Ninja Sentai Kakuranger (1994)
- Chōriki Sentai Ohranger (1995)
- Juukou B-Fighter (1995)
- B-Fighter Kabuto (1996)
- Gekisou Sentai Carranger (1996)
- Purple Eyes in the Dark (1996)
- Seijuu Sentai Gingaman (1998)
- Voicelugger (1999)
- Hyakujuu Sentai Gaoranger (2001)
- Ninpuu Sentai Hurricaneger (2002)
- Kamen Rider Blade (2004)
- Tokusou Sentai Dekaranger (2004)
- Mahou Sentai Magiranger (2005)
- Juken Sentai Gekiranger (2007)
- Kamen Rider Kiva (2008)

==== Film ====
- Engine Sentai Go-onger: Boom Boom! Bang Bang! GekijōBang!! (2008)

=== Actor ===
==== TV Drama ====
- Kaizoku Sentai Gokaiger (2011) - Masa (episode 34)
- Unofficial Sentai Akibaranger (2012) - Himself

==== Film ====
- Juken Sentai Gekiranger: Nei-Nei! Hou-Hou! Hong Kong Decisive Battle (2007) - Martial artist
- Heisei Riders vs. Shōwa Riders: Kamen Rider Taisen feat. Super Sentai (2014) - Worker

=== Stunt actor ===
==== TV Drama ====
- Kenji-kun (1971)
- Playgirl (1971)
- Kamen Rider (1971) - Shocker Combatman, Kamen Rider 1, Kamen Rider 2
- Kamen Rider V3 (1973) - Kamen Rider 1
- Kamen Rider X (1974) - Kamen Rider X
- Kamen Rider Amazon (1974) - Kamen Rider Amazon
- Himitsu Sentai Gorenger (1975) - Akarenger
- Kamen Rider Stronger (1975) - Kamen Rider Stronger
- Daitetsujin 17 (1977) - 17
- Battle Fever J (1979) - Battle Japan
- Denshi Sentai Denziman (1980) - Denzi Red
- Taiyo Sentai Sun Vulcan (1981) - Vul Eagle
- Dai Sentai Goggle-V (1982) - Goggle Red
- Kagaku Sentai Dynaman (1983) - Dyna Red
- Choudenshi Bioman (1984) - Red One
- Dengeki Sentai Changeman (1985) - Change Dragon
- Choushinsei Flashman (1986) - Red Flash
- Hikari Sentai Maskman (1987) - Red Mask
- Choujuu Sentai Liveman (1988) - Red Falcon
- Kousoku Sentai Turboranger (1989) - Red Turbo
- Chikyū Sentai Fiveman (1990) - Five Red
- Chōjin Sentai Jetman (1991) - Red Hawk

==== Film ====
- ESPY
- Himitsu Sentai Gorenger: The Movie (1975) - Akarenger
- Himitsu Sentai Gorenger: The Blue Fortress (1975) - Akarenger
- Himitsu Sentai Gorenger: The Red Death Match (1976) - Akarenger
- Himitsu Sentai Gorenger: Fire Mountain's Deadly Explosion (1976) - Akarenger
- Himitsu Sentai Gorenger: The Bomb Hurricane (1976) - Akarenger
- Battle Fever J (1979) - Battle Japan
- Denshi Sentai Denziman (1980) - Denzi Red
- Taiyo Sentai Sun Vulcan (1981) - Vul Eagle
- Dai Sentai Goggle-V (1982) - Goggle Red
- Kagaku Sentai Dynaman (1983) - Dyna Red
- Choudenshi Bioman (1984) - Red One
- Dengeki Sentai Changeman (1985) - Change Dragon
- Dengeki Sentai Changeman: Shuttle Base! Close Call (1985) - Change Dragon
- Choushinsei Flashman (1986) - Red Flash
- Choushinsei Flashman: Big Rally! Titan Boy (1986) - Red Flash
- Hikari Sentai Maskman (1987) - Red Mask
- Kousoku Sentai Turboranger (1989) - Red Turbo
- Kamen Rider Kiva: King of the Castle in the Demon World (2008) - Kamen Rider Arc
- Gokaiger Goseiger Super Sentai 199 Hero Great Battle (2011) - Akarenger, Red Turbo
- Kamen Rider × Super Sentai: Super Hero Taisen (2012)

==== V-Cinema ====
- Hyakujuu Sentai Gaoranger vs. Super Sentai (2001) - Red Falcon
