= Masayuki Deai =

Japanese actor (born 1981)

- 出合 正幸
- Born: January 21, 1981 (age 45); Osaka Prefecture, Japan
- Occupation: Actor
- Years active: 2003–present
- Known for: Eiji Takaoka / Bouken Silver in GoGo Sentai Boukenger

Masayuki Deai (出合 正幸, Deai Masayuki; born January 21, 1981) is a Japanese actor from Osaka Prefecture. He is most famous for his portrayal of Eiji Takaoka in the tokusatsu series GoGo Sentai Boukenger.

His first on-screen appearance was as an extra in the 2003 American film, The Last Samurai.

He made a return to the tokusatsu genre in 2010, appearing as the Trigger Dopant in Kamen Rider W Forever: A to Z/The Gaia Memories of Fate. In 2013, he played Tessai/Kyoryu Grey, the pilot of Bunpachy, in Zyuden Sentai Kyoryuger.

== Filmography ==
=== Film ===
Year	Title	Role	Notes	Ref.
2025	Seppuku: The Sun Goes Down	Kyuzo		
2026	Service Oath			

=== TV series ===
Year	Title	Role	Notes	Ref.
2025	Masked Ninja Akakage	Akudoji		
