= Daisaku Shinohara =

Japanese actor

- 篠原 大作
- Born: 4 July 1933; Hokkaido, Japan
- Died: 1 February 2016 (aged 82)
- Occupations: Actor; voice actor
- Spouse: Keiko Hanagata (m. –2015)

Daisaku Shinohara (篠原 大作, Shinohara Daisaku; 4 July 1933–1 February 2016) was a Japanese actor and voice actor. He was born in Hokkaido. His wife was voice actress Keiko Hanagata.

Shinohara was represented by Tokyo Actor's Consumer's Cooperative Society and later moved to 81 Produce until he died.

== Filmography ==
=== TV drama ===
Year	Title	Role	Network	Notes
	Yonimo Kimyōna Monogatari: Ma-ba-ta-ki		Fuji TV	
1975	Kōfuku yuki		TBS	
1976	Taiyō ni Hoero!		NTV	Episodes 201, 214, 316, 666, 701, 707, 708
1979	Tokusō Saizensen		TV Asahi	Episodes 127, 186, 344, 396, 430
	Kinpachi-sensei	Eiji Sonoda	TBS	1st Series Episode 10
1981	G-Men '75		TBS	Episode 381
1983	Soap Jō Momoko Series 2: Seibo Momoko no Junan		TBS	
1983	Tokugawa Ieyasu	Ashikaga Yoshiaki	NHK	Taiga drama
1984	Sanga Moyu		NHK	Taiga drama
1988	Hagure Keiji Junjō-ha		TV Asahi	
1988	Seicho Matsumoto Special: Yasashī Chihō		NTV	
1989	Gorilla Keishichō Sōsa Dai 8 Han		TV Asahi	
1990	Yobikō Boogie		TBS	
1997	Odoru Dai Sōsa-sen: Saimatsu Tokubetsu Keikai Special		Fuji TV	
2000	Aoi Tokugawa Sandai	Ikoma Chikamasa	NHK	Taiga drama
2000	Virtual Girl		NTV	

=== Films ===
Year	Title	Role
1987	Tokyo Blackout	
1998	Bayside Shakedown: The Movie	National Police Agency Commissioner's Secretariat Affairs Deputy Director-General

=== Stage ===
Year	Title	Role
1980	12 Hito no Ukareru Otoko	Second jurist

=== Anime television ===
Year	Title	Role
1969	Attack No. 1	Play-by-play announcer
1973	Samurai Giants	
1973	Dokonjō Gaeru	
1976	Dokaben	Announcer
1977	Yakyū-kyō no Uta	Kido
1978	Ikkyū-san	
1978	The Story of Perrine	Edmond Pandaboanu
1978	Invincible Steel Man Daitarn 3	Announcer
1979	Star of the Giants	Tatsuro Hirooka
1991	Armored Police Metal Jack	Surgeon
1997	Detective Conan	Tomoyasu Kanazawa
1998	Master Keaton	Ilia's father
2002	Heat Guy J	Grandfather
2002	Wagamama Fairy: Mirmo de Pon!	Chouro
2003	Croket!	Ojin
2004	Kyo Kara Maoh!	Baker
2004	tactics	Village headman
2005	Oh My Goddess!	President
2005	Starship Operators	Kawaji
2005	Tsubasa: Reservoir Chronicle	Mayor
2005	Magical Canan	Okehazama
2006	Pururun! Shizuku-chan	Paradise teacher
2007	El Cazador de la Bruja	Ritogen Senator
2007	Gurren Lagann	Principal
2008	Golgo 13	Bar master
2008	Scarecrow Man	Grandfather
2008	Zettai Karen Children	Dairin-san
2008	Zenryoku Usagi	Old gentleman
2008	Blade of the Immortal	Toragyo Asano
2009	Element Hunters	Nadi Surrenda
2011	Hyouge Mono	Kuroda Yoshitaka, Hasegawa Tōhaku
2013	The Flowers of Evil	Nekomachido shopkeeper

=== Video games ===
Year	Title	Role
2005	Romancing SaGa: Minstrel Song	Gath, Nizam
2011	Tales of Xillia	House
2012	Tales of Xillia 2	House

=== Dubbing ===
==== Films ====
Year	Title	Role	Notes	Ref.
	Winning			
1974	Violent City	Announcer	TV Asahi version	
1975	Duel		TV Asahi version	
1977	The Red Tent	Narrator, Radio D, Radio announcer, Sailor E, Panoroff		
1985	Saturn 3		Fuji TV version	
1986	The Killers		Software version	
1988	Death Wish 3		TV Asahi version	
1995	Under Siege	Admiral aide	TV Asahi version; included in the Blu-Ray release	
2000	Eye of the Beholder			
2000	Sleepy Hollow	Doctor Thomas Lancaster, New York mayor		
2000	Wonderland	Bill		
2001	Bridget Jone's Diary	Fitz Herbert		
2002	Harry Potter and the Chamber of Secrets	Cornelius Fudge		
2002	Wild Wild West		NTV version	
2004	Harry Potter and the Prisoner of Azkaban	Cornelius Fudge		
2004	Rencontre avec le dragon			
2005	Harry Potter and the Goblet of Fire	Cornelius Fudge		
2005	Baltic Storm	Yuri		
2006	Kiss of the Dragon		TV Tokyo version	
2007	Harry Potter and the Order of the Phoenix	Cornelius Fudge		
2009	Harry Potter and the Half-Blood Prince	Cornelius Fudge		

==== TV series ====
Year	Title	Role	Notes
1964	The Outer Limits	Terrance Brookman, Dr. Williams	
1990	Agatha Christie's Poirot		
1990	The Young Riders	Murphy	Episode 25
1992	Quantum Leap	Dr. Berger	
1993	Road to Avonlea	Duke Alaner	
2002	ER	Pastor	
2005	The West Wing	Bob Ingler	
2005	Spin City	Mayor Randall Wilson	

=== Puppetry ===
Year	Title	Role
1963	Iga no Kagemaru	
1966	Thunderbirds	Johnson

=== Tokusatsu ===
Year	Title	Role	Notes
1964	Phantom Agents	Benito	Episodes 3 and 4
1967	Kōsoku Esper		Episode 2
1968	Ultra Seven	Climbing announcer	Episode 49
1968	Mighty Jack	Narrator	Episode 19
1972	Barom-1	Radio announcer	Episode 29
1974	Kikaider 01	Announcer	Episode 34
1976	Battle Hawk	Announcer	Episode 9
1977	Space Ironman Kyodain		Episode 40
1977	Himitsu Sentai Goranger	Announcer	Episode 78
1985	Katte ni! Kamitaman	Phantom of the Wild Kingdom	Episode 24
1985	Kyodai Ken Byclosser	Announcer	Episode 30
1989	The Mobile Cop Jiban		Episode 23
1990	Special Rescue Police Winspector	Osamu Natsugawa	Episode 45
1991	Super Rescue Solbrain	Director of Aoyama Electric	Episode 4

=== CD ===
Title	Role
Kanon Nanami Drama CD Series Shūrei Gakuin Kōkō Monogatari: Densetsu no Shōnen	Iikura

=== Radio ===
Year	Title
1984	KR Radio Toshokan: Maboroshi no Shirokuma

=== Narration ===
Title	Notes
Kaiketsu Lion-Maru	
Tokubetsu Kidō Sōsa-tai	Trailer only
Kon'a mo Dollar Hako	
Document Chikyū Jikan	"America Daitōryō to sono Jidai"
News Station	

=== Voice overs ===
Title	Network
Idainaru Tabibito Teiwa	NHK
NHK Special	NHK
9.11 New Yorker-tachi no 5-nen	NHK
Hitachi: Sekai fushigi Hakken!	TBS

=== Others ===
Title	Notes
Shōwa Tennō no Jidai	DVD; reading
Shoku King	Motion comic; Chen treasure
