= Tokusou Robo Janperson =

- Tokusou Robo Janperson
- Genre: Tokusatsu; Superhero fiction Mystery fiction Science fiction Cyberpunk
- Created by: Saburō Yatsude
- Developed by: Junichi Miyashita
- Directed by: Michio Konishi
- Starring: Tomoko Kawashima; Shigeo Tomita; Shun Sugata; Kimiko Imai; Akiko Yugawa; Kazuoki Takahashi; Atsuko Takahata
- Voices of: Yuichi Komine; Yoshinari Torii
- Narrated by: Morio Banba
- Country of origin: Japan
- No. of episodes: 50

Production
- Running time: 25 minutes
- Production companies: Toei Company; Asatsu-DK

Original release
- Network: TV Asahi (ANN)
- Release: January 31, 1993 – January 23, 1994

Related
- Special Rescue Exceedraft; Blue SWAT

Tokusou Robo Janperson (特捜ロボ ジャンパーソン, Tokusō Robo Janpāson; lit. "Robot Investigator Janperson") is a Japanese television show and 1993 installment in Toei Company's Metal Hero Series franchise and heavily inspired by the American film FutureForce and FutureZone only plot and Robocop only Heroes.

The two names given to this series by Toei for international distribution are Janperson or Jumperson.

== Plot ==
The series revolves around Janperson, a robotic detective who patrols the streets of Tokyo and fights against three different underworld organizations that use super technology to subjugate the masses. Unlike most Metal Heroes, a monster-of-the-week is rarely shown and most of the villains are criminals akin to television police dramas.

== Characters ==
=== Main ===
- Janperson (ジャンパーソン, Janpāson) - A purple/silver-colored android who works as a detective. He was once a prototype combat robot known as MX-A1, driven berserk by the command to "Destroy Evil," which led to his deactivation. He was later stripped of most weaponry and reprogrammed with human emotions by the young female scientist Kaoru Saegusa. Like RoboCop, Future Force or Future Zone, he upholds the law and he is purely mechanical. He is seen to be the kind of police officer who never gives up that easily. He also has problems dealing with his former life as MX-A1 when he is forced to destroy evil easily. Janperson is the fifth Metal Hero to bear the emblem of the Japanese National Police Agency, and the first since The Mobile Cop Jiban to mostly fight alone.
- Gun Gibson (ガンギブソン, Gan Gibuson) - A grey-colored, heavy-armed android created by the Gang Guards (associated with the Neo-Guild) to destroy Janperson, he later switched sides and became Janperson's android partner. Armed with two guns - one with an aiming bullet and the other a dumb bullet. He was later armed with a powerful bazooka which he used in battle and had a motorcycle that he uses during battles. Although thought to have been destroyed by Bill Goldy near the finale, he was shown to have survived well enough and joined in the final battle. He had an android-girlfriend named Carol who was also made by the Gang Guards and was killed by the Gang Guards during their first battle with Janperson. Carol was revived by Kaoru at the end of the series, only to be killed again.
- Kaoru Saegusa (三枝 かおる, Saegusa Kaoru) - A young female scientist who is one of Janperson's creators. She reactivated and reprogrammed Janperson after it was shut down the first time by placing human emotions inside it. She gets and gives information to Janperson about his nemesis during the series. She seemingly betrayed Janperson towards the end of the series by destroying their headquarters and reviving Gun Gibson's android-girlfriend Carol. It was found out that these are only just her undercover strategies to get the confidence of Tatewaki/Bill Goldy and find a way to help Janperson to defeat him.
- Shuhei Saegusa (三枝 周平, Saegusa Shūhei) - An elementary school student who is Kaoru's younger brother.
- Koujiro Komori (小森 好次郎, Komori Kōjirō) - A senior police detective. He is best known by the self-styled moniker the Batman of the Metropolitan Police Department (桜田門のバットマン, Sakuradamon no Battoman) due to his surname often mispronounced as the Japanese word for "bat" (蝙蝠, kōmori). Though capable, he has since fallen into a slump, becoming a third-rate and seemingly incompetent cop. Despite this, Koujirou still maintains high airs, delegating menial tasks to his junior partner Shiro Takaido ranging from paying his food bill up to his grooming. A running gag in the show is that he always seems to get into close encounters with a plastic garbage bin while pursuing criminals, most notably getting flung head-first into it. Koujirou resents being upstaged by Janperson, and takes it upon himself to unmask the real identity of the mysterious hero. He is portrayed by Takahiko Ota who previously portrayed Shingo Takasugi/Green Two in Choudenshi Bioman.
- Shiro Takaido (高井戸 志郎, Takaido Shirō) - Komori's junior detective subordinate. He no longer shows up after the first 13 episodes. He is portrayed by Junichiro Katagiri, who previously portrayed Shunshuke Hino/Yellow Turbo in Kousoku Sentai Turboranger.
- Aki Wakabayashi (若林 アキ, Wakabayashi Aki) - A JBC TV reporter. Although she has positive views of Janperson, she is disgusted by the police's incompetence (In fact, at the end of the first episode, when Komori was watching the news, she calls the police incompetent), clashing with Komori. She no longer shows up after episode 6.
- R-Zico (アールジーコ, Ārujīko) - A robot ally of Janperson, he can connect to the Jan Digic to become the Zic Cannon. He tends to call Janperson "Janper-chan" (the first appearance only), Gun Gibson "Ganmodoki", and Kaoru "Mammy".

==== Arsenal ====
- Janperson's arsenal
  - Janperson Cards (ジャンパーソンカード, Janpāson Kādo) - There are five types; JP Card (JPカード, Jei Pī Kādo), Warning Card (ウォーニングカード, Wōningu Kādo), Destroy Card (デストロイカード, Desutoroi Kādo), Guilty Card (ギルティカード, Giruti Kādo), and Contact Card (コンタクトカード, Kontakuto Kādo).
  - Backlet Controller (バックレットコントローラー, Bakkuretto Kontorōrā): Bill Goldy has the Backlet Jammer (バックレットジャマー, Bakkuretto Jamā).
  - Jan Digic (ジャンデジック, Jan Dejikku)
    Bill Goldy has the Gold Digic (ゴールドデジック, Gōrudo Dejikku)
  - Zic Cannon (ジックキャノン, Jikku Kyanon)
  - Wire Punch (ワイヤーパンチ, Waiyā Panchi)
  - Knee Kick Missile (ニーキックミサイル, Nī Kikku Misairu)
  - Jastick (ジャスティック, Jasutikku)
  - Dual Laser (デュアルレーザー, Dyuaru Rēzā)
  - Jan Blader (ジャンブレーダー, Jan Burēdā)
  - Jan Vulcan (JP Streamer) (ジャンバルカン（JPストリーマー）, Jan Barukan (Jei Pī Sutorīmā))
  - Break Knuckle (ブレイクナックル, Bureiku Nakkuru)
  - Arc Fire (アークファイヤー, Āku Faiyā)
- Gun Gibson's arsenal
  - Gunvolver (ガンボルバー, Ganborubā)
  - Browson (ブローソン, Burōson)
  - Spindle Cannon (スピンドルキャノン, Supindoru Kyanon)
  - Gun Gibson Medal (ガンギブソンメダル, Gan Gibuson Medaru)

==== Vehicles ====
- Janperson's vehicles
  - Dark Jeycar (ダークジェイカー, Dāku Jeikā) - A modified Chevrolet Corvette C3. It contains a small detachable fighter airplane called Sky Jeycar (スカイジェイカー, Sukai Jeikā) a detachable helicopter. The Sky Jaycar has a maximum speed of 1,800 kilometers per hour. After the Sky Jeycar detaches, the car becomes the Land Jeycar (ランドジェイカー, Rando Jeikā), an unmanned autonomous car, equipped with the Big Cannon (ビッグキャノン, Biggu Kyanon).
  - JeyGulliver (ジェイガリバー, Jeigaribā) - A large fighter airplane that has a small submarine called Marine Jeycar (マリンジェイカー, Marin Jeikā) and a small subterranean drill tank called Drill Jeycar (ドリルジェイカー, Doriru Jeikā). By holding the Dark Jeycar, it becomes the Grand Jeycar (グランドジェイカー, Gurando Jeikā).
- Gun Gibson's vehicle
  - GG Slayer (GGスレイヤー（Gun Gibsonスレイヤー）, Gan Gibuson Sureiyā) - A modified Suzuki Savage.

=== Villains ===
==== Guild ====
The Guild (ギルド, Girudo) was an evil organization of cyborgs whose goal was to eradicate and replace all humanity. Janperson eventually discovered their existence and destroyed the power source for their infiltration robots. The Guild ultimately fell when their leader self-destructed in a last ditch effort to destroy Janperson. The Guild was succeeded by the Neo Guild.

- Ben Fujinami (ベン藤波, Ben Fujinami) - Real name: Ben Makabe. The cyborg boss of Guild. He is George Makabe's elder brother. Although he holds an intense hatred for humans, later in the show, it has been revealed that the cause is the same as George. He wields a baton, and laser equipment that shoots mysterious light rays from the arms to attack. In the second episode, he is defeated with a Search Laser from the Jan Digic and the Guild headquarters were destroyed by self-destruction.
- GuilBlackers (ギルドブラッカー, Giruburakkā) - The human-like Guild foot soldiers. They are deadly and built with a variety of weapons in their bodies. They would later serve the Neo-Guild.

==== Tatewaki Konzern ====
Tatewaki Konzern (帯刀コンツェルン, Tatewaki Kontserun) is a financial corporation that seeks to destroy its rivals.

- Ryuzaburo Tatewaki/Bill Goldy (帯刀龍三郎/ビルゴルディ, Tatewaki Ryuzaburō/Birugorudi) - An evil cyborg duplicate of Janperson that was originally a human, he is a lunatic and the president of Tatewaki Konzern. He is usually seen licking a lollipop while watching Janperson fights his assassins. He later became a cyborg, via an operation, from the blue prints of how Janperson was made. He usually executes silly plans at first, but later on became serious with his schemes. He tried to frame Janperson, by impersonating his identity through his alter ego, as Bill Goldy, and used his name, in vain, but ingeniously failed. In the end, Janperson and Gun Gibson killed him once and for all, as the only means to save the world, as he was already far too dangerous. He was stabbed by Janperson, at the heart, with the Jan Blade. His final words before his destruction were "I'll be back." Bill Goldy was later revived in the Juukou B-Fighter finale special by Jagul, who used him as a pawn before absorbing him into her body. Enraged for this act, Bill Goldy personally dragged her to Hell with him. Bill Goldy also has Bill Goldy Cards (ビルゴルディカード, Biru Gorudi Kādo).
- Maya (マヤ, Maya) - One of Tatewaki's most trusted bodyguards and personal assistant. She is very formidable in hand-to-hand combat, firearms, and swordsmanship. When jumping into action, she throws off her professional attire to reveal her red and silver body armor.
- Sarah (セーラ, Sēra) - Another one of Tatewaki's bodyguards who also serves as his liaison between him and his mercenaries. Sarah was killed halfway into the series.
- Cindy (シンディ, Shindi) - She was hired as Sarah's replacement serving the same responsibilities alongside Maya.
- Tatewaki Combatants (竹脇戦闘員, Takewaki sentō-in) - The foot soldiers of the Tatewaki Konzern.

===== Villains =====
Tatewaki would employ different assassins and mercenaries to deal with Janperson with some of them either personally employed by Tatewaki or blackmailed by Tatewaki:

- Bounty Killer Django (バウンティキラー ジャンゴ, Baunti Kirā Jango) - A cowboy assassin hired by Tatewaki to destroy Janperson. Django arsenal includes a handgun, rifle, and laser bazooka. He killed himself in failed suicide bombing attempt on Janperson.
- The Street Fighters (ストリートファイター, Sutorīto Faitā) - A pair Chinese siblings hired to destroy Janperson. Zhen Da Guang (珍大光, Chin Tākoan) is armed with a Dao saber and Zhen Xiao Guang (珍小光, Chin Shaokoan) is armed with a pair of sai. Xiao Guang is killed when all the assassins rushed Janperson at once. Da Guang vowed to get revenge, but was still unable to beat Janperson on his own. Da Guang committed suicide by blowing himself up with a bomb.
- Wind Demon Ninja Doki (風魔忍者 怒鬼, Fūma Ninja Doki) - A Japanese assassin hired alongside Django and the Street Fighters to destroy Janperson. Doki is a master of disguise, duel wields a pair of swords to fight, and uses ninja techniques such as hiding underground. Doki committed seppuku after failing to beat Janperson one-on-one.
- Sakakura (坂倉, Sakakura; 7) - A professional gentleman thief dressed in a flashy leisure suit. He is very sneaky in combat by pulling weapons seemingly from thin air and replacing himself with dummies. Tatewaki hired Sakakura to pilfer a valuable Russian diamond called The Snow Queen. To pull off the heist, Sakakura implanted a mind control chip on a young girl named Yuriko and secretly trained her to steal for three months. After the diamond heist was successful, Sakakura was going to dispose of Yuriko and her friends until Janperson came to the rescue. Despite his dirty fighting tricks, Sakakura was defeated by Janperson's Knee Kick Missile and then arrested.
- Misato Ishizaki (石崎ミサト, Ishizaki Misato) - A person better known as Robot Hunter Misato (ロボットハンターミサト, Robotto Hantā Misato). She is a young woman who dedicated her life to complete her late brother's project by hunting down robots for parts. Misato's brother Takeshi had created a robotic double of himself, but it still required a compatible A.I. chip. Tatewaki hired Misato, promising her that Janperson had the chip she needed. However, Tatewaki double-crossed her by selling her out to a crime syndicate she accosted earlier and reprogrammed Takeshi's robot double. Janperson destroyed the double and saved Misato, much to her anger. However, she reluctantly accepted that her brother was dead and was advised by Janperson to start her life over.
- Copy Robot (コピーロボット, Kopīrobotto) is a robot duplicate of Takeshi. Destroyed by Janperson.
- Dennis Takegami (デニス・タケガミ, Denisu Takegami) is a mafia boss. He wanted revenge on Misato Ishizaki only to be defeated and arrested by Janperson.
- Johnny (ジョニー, Jonī) is a robot assassin working for Dennis Takegami who was destroyed by Misato Ishizaki.
- Angel (エンジェル, Enjeru) - A white robot who was unaware of his true purpose as saboteur robot. After his creator died in a laboratory explosion, Angel stumbled upon a small band of factory workers who took him in and treated him as a friend. However, Angel's new life was soon put to an end by Tatewaki who strong-armed Angel into attack his business rivals. If Angel refused to cooperate, his new human friends would be killed. By serving Tatewaki, Angel unlocked his hidden weapons and abilities such as an electromagnetic shield, a chest mounted cannon, and a pair of wings. As he continued to cause chaos and destruction, Angel began to embrace his role as an angel of death. Janperson defeated Angel by destroying his wings. Angel's weapons were removed and allowed himself to be taken into custody
- Jeff Gondo (ジェフ権藤, Jefu Gondō) - A mafia capo who ordered his goons to capture Kaoru so he can force her to make a super weapon. Initially unaffiliated with the three active villain factions, Tatewaki joined force's with Gondo when they learned about Kaoru's association with Janperson. With Tatewaki's help, Gondo kidnapped Kaoru's brother Shuhei to use as bait. Unbeknownst to Gondo, Tatewaki planted a bomb on him to ensure Janperson's destruction. Janperson, who had finally conquered his MX-A1 persona, rescued the Saegusa siblings and apprehended Gondo.
- Lugo (ルーゴ, Rūgo) - The younger brother of Bounty Killer Django who wanted revenge on Janperson for what happened to his brother.
- Rio (リオ, Rio) - An alien from a wartorn planet who assumed the form of a boy and was manipulated by Tatewaki. When Rio learned the truth when fighting Janperson, he was shot by Bill Goldy. Before Rio dies and turns into light particles, Janperson learns about the war on his planet.
- Professor Sanada (真田教授, Sanada Kyōju) - A scientist at Tatewaki Konzern's submarine department.
- Silent (静けさ, Shizukesa) - A robot created by Professor Sanada who specializes in deep sea work.
- Gelsomina (ジェルソミーナ, Jerusomīna) - A robot created by Professor Sanada.

==== Neo Guild ====
The Neo Guild is the successor of Guild consisting of renegade robots that also wants to eradicate mankind.

- George Makabe (ジョージ真壁, Jōji Makabe) - The head of the renegade robot organization the Neo Guild. He is actually a human, but Janperson thought that he was a cyborg like his elder brother Ben Fujinami. He vowed to mechanize the world after he and his elder brother Ben lost their first android assistant when they were kids. When Ben (as a cyborg) was "killed" by Janperson in the early part of the series, he reformed the Neo Guild into a stronger organization, vowing to destroy Janperson and rule the planet. Near the end of the series, he was revealed to be just a human with mechanical implants (unlike his elder brother Ben who became a full cyborg). Rather than submit to death at the hands of the heroes, he chose to commit suicide. He is portrayed by Kazuoki Takahashi who previously portrayed Sho Hayate/Change Gryphon in Dengeki Sentai Changeman.

===== Neo Guild's robots =====
The robots in the Neo Guild are used to either infiltrate the human race or destroy Janperson.

- Omega DX (オメガDX, Omega Di Ekkusu; 5) - A killer robot specifically created to combat Janperson. The Neo Guild analyzed Janperson's known abilities and programmed countermeasures into Omega DX. Fortunately, Janperson unveiled the Acr Fire and Jan Blader, weapons that the Neo Guild did not have any data for. The Omega DX was destroyed by a slash of the Jan Blader.
- Falcon 13 (ファルコン13, Farukon Sātīn; 9) - A scientist robot who masqueraded as a scientist named Tsuyoshi Kinameri (木滑剛, Kinameri Tsuyoshi). While in disguise, Kinameri performed operations to transfer brainwaves of dying humans into robot bodies, and disposing the originals. The Neo Guild planned to use the robots as sleeper agents and plant them in key locations to destroy the human race. Kinameri revealed his true Falcon 13 form when Janperson was closing in on one of their key sleeper agents. Falcon 13 was destroyed by a blast from both the Jan Vulcan and Jan Digic.
- Carla Takashima (カルーラ高島, Karūra Takashima) - The insane masculine president of the SEEP Robot Company, a business that rents out SEEP robots to the public for labor and other menial tasks. She conspired with the Neo Guild to take over the world by using the SEEP robots to steal top secret information for the Neo Guild. However, Makabe severed ties with her when Carla bungled the mission by using Neo Guild troops to attack Janperson prematurely. Now on her own, she activated a protocol to make the SEEP units riot. Carla was revealed to be a robot herself and was destroyed by the Jan Blader.
- SEEP #A38 (シープA38号, Shīpu A San Jū Hachi Gō) - One of 100 SEEP units created by the SEEP Robot Company, affectionally named Kevin (ケビン, Kebin). Kevin and his kind were unaware of their true purpose as sleeper agents for the Neo Guild. The robots were placed in key locations to steal valuable data to the unsuspecting human race. After a fallout between the company president and the Neo Guild, an evil command was issued to cause Kevin and the rest of the SEEP units to riot. Janperson shielded Kevin from the Carla's control and the both of them joined forces to stop her. With Carla destroyed and the SEEP robots peaceful again, Kevin was allowed to live in peace with his adopted family.
- U2 (U2, Yū Tsū) - An infiltration robot that planted bombs on Neo Guild targets. In a confrontation with Janperson, U2 was damaged and lost his memory. While attempting to repair himself, U2 befriended a young boy named Masahiko, who defended U2 when Janperson tried to apprehend him. Masahiko's kindness made U2 realize how evil Neo Guild's cause truly was and allowed Janperson to hack his damaged memories to find the latest bomb he planted. U2 was severely damaged beyond repair when he shielded Masahiko from Dollman's reanimated arm. U2 died wishing he had been built a hero instead of for evil.
- Dollman (ドールマン, Dōruman) - Neo Guild's latest assassin robot model assigned to destroy the lost U2. Dollman possess claws, eye missiles, and fierce hand-to-hand skills, making him a deadly opponent for Janperson. He was destroyed by the Jan Vulcan and Jan Digic, except for one of his hands, which came back to life to finish off U2. Dollman's hand eventually self-destructed.
- R3 (R3号, Arū San Gō) - A strongman-looking robot that was the first in a new line of Neo Guild robots capable of willpower. Makabe deduced that Janperson kept winning against the Neo Guild because of his undeterred resolve to protect the innocent. By giving R3 evil emotions and willpower, Makabe finally expected to defeat Janperson once and for all. In his first fight, Janperson's original MX-A1 program took over and beat R3 to near death. A blow to R3's head caused him to access positive emotions, forcing the Neo Guild to take corrective action. Each attempt to fix R3's brain caused R3 to cycle through different personalities including Florence Nightingale, Count Dracula, Tarzan, Toyama no Kin-san, Yuri Gagarin, Gavan, and ultimately a child. The personalities overwhelmed R3 causing him overload and self-destruct.
- Professor Tonda (頓田博士, Tonda Hakase) - A scientist and one of a few human collaborators with the Neo Guild. Tonda developed a large spirit injection tool that would invigorate Neo Guild robots with willpower. His first robot, R3, was endowed with cruelty and hatred to ensure Neo Guild's triumph. However, R3's emotions went haywire, forcing Tonda to take his spirit injector into the field and correct R3's brain. But with each injection, R3 would develop a different personality. After R3 self-destructed, Tonda attempted to attack Janperson with the spirit injector, but Janperson's inner demons emerged and almost killed him. Tonda was apprehended by the police as he was fleeing from Janperson.

==== Super Science Network ====
The Super Science Network (SS-N(スーパーサイエンスネットワーク), Sūpā Saiensu Nettowāku) is a biological underworld organization.

- Reiko Ayanokouji (綾小路 麗子, Ayanokōji Reiko) - The diabolical head of SS-N (Super Science Network). She turns out to actually have plans to restore the Earth to beauty, acting as more of a villain with noble intentions. Her intentions are a result of her childhood, growing up on a Space Station with her parents, raising endangered plants and flowers where she saw how beautiful the Earth could be without humanity destroying it. The Space Station got damaged and as it exploded her father put her in an Escape Pod and sent her to Earth. Determined to fulfill her parents' wishes to make the Earth beautiful, she undergoes a Bio Transformation into a flower-like Super Beast God monster near the end of the series and tried to turn all of humanity into fertilizers, hoping to restart the Earth as she saw fit. The Human Fertilizer capable of reviving dead plant life, her master plan was to get rid of humans and become the God of Earth. She eventually died, after receiving heavy injury from Janperson's Flash Cannon, watching an old Film reel of her time on the Space Station. She turned into a shower of beautiful white petals. Reiko's Super Beast God form made a cameo in the final story arc of Jukou B-Fighter where she was absorbed by Sorceress Jagul as her Super Beast God face appeared on Destruction Goddess Jagul.

===== Super Science Network villains =====
The Super Science Network has employed various human subjects, mercenaries, and scientists.

- Sukezo Kudo (工藤助三, Kudō Sukezō; 6) - An ordinary blue collar worker that was accidentally trapped inside a warehouse freezer. Kudo managed to escape one year later, but the cold temperature mutated his body to the point where he required sub-zero temperatures to survive. Another side effect is his ability to freeze anything or anyone he touched. The SS-N took notice of Kudo's mutation and enhanced his powers, using his status as a freak to convince him. Now rechristened Iceman (冷凍人間(アイスマン), Aisuman), he was unleashed to wreak havoc with his new ice breath. In his final confrontation with Janperson, Iceman was exposed to fire and tragically melted away.
- Dr. Shiina (ドクター椎名, Dokutā Shīna; 6) - A SS-N scientist so devoted to Reiko, he planted a bomb in his body and gave her the detonator as a gift. Preying upon Sukezo Kudo, a mutated human, Shina transformed Kudo into Iceman. Per Reiko's orders, Shina used Iceman in an effort to capture Janperson alive for the SS-N's experiments. After Iceman's destruction, Shina was ready to die by his own bomb, but Reiko simply dropped him into a bottomless pit.
- Doctor Saionji (ドクター西園寺, Dokutā Saionji; 8) - An effeminate and vain scientist who claimed to be Reiko's number one favorite, developed a special substance called Foam Memory Cells (形状記憶細胞, Keijō kioku saibō). Saionji's plan was to use the Foam Memory Cells to copy the appearance of a criminal named Machinegun Joe and transform Janperson into said criminal. He got a taste of his own medicine when Janperson exposed Saionji to the foam during a struggle. Saionji was arrested by the police, trapped in Machinegun Joe's likeness.
- Daikichi Izumiya (泉谷大吉, Izumiya Daikichi)/Daikoku-ten (大黒天, Daikoku-ten) and Chukichi Izumiya (泉谷中吉, Izumiya Chūkichi)/Ebisu (えびす, Ebisu) - A pair of siblings dressed like two of the Seven Lucky Gods, committing robberies and using the loot as tribute for Reiko. Like his namesake, Daikoku carries a mallet (uchide no kozuchi) which is really an ultra sonic device that hypnotizes people into a dream-like state of pleasure. Ebisu carries a large fishing rod and bombs shaped like koi. At Reiko's request, they used a giant version of Daikoku's mallet put Janperson into a dream hypnosis and dismantle him. Janperson broke free and defeated the fake gods, leaving them for the police.
- The Iron Soldier (鉄鋼兵, Tekkō-hei) - An ancient robot from a lost civilization. The SS-N took interest in it and assumed Janperson himself was also part of the same civilization. The Iron Soldier and its brethren were originally created to serve mankind, but turned against humans when their remote controls fell into evil hands. History repeated itself when SS-N mercenary, Osaki, took possession of the Iron Soldier's remote and ordered it to kill everyone. The remote was unfortunately destroyed and the Iron Soldier went berserk. Janperson destroyed the Iron Soldier with the Jan Vulcan.
- Osaki (大崎, Ōsaki) - A SS-N mercenary assigned to locate the ruins of the Iron Soldier. Successful in his search, Osaki stole the Iron Soldier's remote control to make it do his bidding. However, Osaki's order backfired when the remote control was damaged. He was disintegrated by the Iron Soldier's laser beams.
- Panther Lady (パンサーレディ, Pansā Redi) - Her real name is Sayoko Ishiguro (石黒小夜子, Ishiguro Sayoko). She is an expert on matter transmission and lady thief for the SS-N. She is armed with a bullwhip and wears a leopard-themed costume made of a special material that transmits matter into electronic devices, including robots like Janperson. To maintain the costume's electronic transmission abilities, Panther Lady needed to steal blue diamonds. If she stole enough diamonds, the SS-N would be able to transmit large armies and take over the city. With the help of a local police detective, Janperson shorted out Panther Lady's powers and had her arrested.
- Doctor Koga (ドクター甲賀, Dokutā Kōga) - His real name is Masao Aoki (青木マサオ, Aoki Masao), a geneticist who theorized people with ninja lineage carried a "ninja gene" that could be harnessed to turn an ordinary person into a full-fledged ninja. His efforts to extract the gene and create an army of ninjas were decried as inhumane, leading him to take his talents to the SS-N. Koga abducted ninja descendants and performed surgeries until he successfully found a candidate that possessed the gene. Janperson teamed up with the victim to destroy Koga's laboratory, rescue the abductees, and capture Koga himself.

== Cast ==
- Kojiro Komori
  Takahiko Ota (太田 貴彦, Ōta Takahiko)
- Shiro Takaido
  Junichiro Katagiri (片桐 順一郎, Katagiri Junichirō)
- Aki Wakabayashi
  Miwa Kanzaki (観崎 美和, Kanzaki Miwa)
- Kaoru Saegusa
  Tomoko Kawashima (川嶋 朋子, Kawashima Tomoko)
- Shuhei Saegusa
  Shigeo Tomita (富田 樹央, Tomita Shigeo)
- Ryuzaburo Tatewaki
  Shun Sugata (菅田 俊, Sugata Shun)
- Maya
  Kimiko Imai (今井 喜美子, Imai Kimiko)
- Cindy
  Akiko Yugawa (湯川 晶子, Yugawa Akiko)
- George Makabe
  Kazuoki Takahashi (4-46)
- Reiko Ayanokoji
  Atsuko Takahata (4-44)
- Sarah
  Saori Iwama (3, 25, 39)

=== Voice cast ===
- Janperson
  Yuichi Komine
- Gun Gibson
  Yoshinari Torii (21-23, 25, 27-50)
- Falcon 13/Tsuyoshi Kinameri
  Shinzo Hotta (9)
- Kevin/Carol/Black Carol
  Makoto Kousaka (12; Kevin) (21-22; Carol) (48-49; Black Carol)
- Angel
  Yūji Ueda (15)
- R-Zico
  Hideki Ishikawa (31-50)
- Narrator
  Morio Banba

== Episodes ==
1. The Mysterious New Hero - 1/31/1993: written by Junichi Miyashita, directed by Michio Konishi
2. I Am Justice! - 2/7/1993: written by Junichi Miyashita, directed by Michio Konishi
3. The Robo Hunters Arrive! - 2/14/93: written by Junichi Miyashita, directed by Masao Minowa
4. The Strongest Army Bares its Fangs - 2/21/1993: written by Junichi Miyashita, directed by Masao Minowa
5. Fly into my Heart - 2/28/1993: written by Junichi Miyashita, directed by Kaneharu Mitsumura
6. The Wandering Iceman - 3/7/1993: written by Nobuo Ogizawa, directed by Kaneharu Mitsumura
7. I'm a Girl? - 3/14/1993: written by Kyoko Sagiyama, directed by Hidenori Ishida
8. Behold the New Hero's Face! - 3/21/1993 : written by Hirohisa Soda, directed by Hidenori Ishida
9. My Dad is a Monster! - 3/28/1993: written by Junichi Miyashita, directed by Masao Minowa
10. Beware the God of Luck - 4/4/1993: written by Nobuo Ogizawa, directed by Masao Minowa
11. Smile of the Weakling Warrior - 4/11/1993: written by Takahiko Masuda, directed by Kaneharu Mitsumura
12. Revolt of the Delivery Robots - 4/18/1993: written by Naoyuki Sakai, directed by Kaneharu Mitsumura
13. The Secret of Janperson, Super Ancient Soldier - 4/25/1993: written by Akira Asaka, directed by Michio Konishi
14. Friendship on the Brink of Explosion - 5/2/1993: written by Mutsumi Nakano, directed by Michio Konishi
15. The Angel who threw away his Wings - 5/9/1993: written by Nobuo Ogizawa, directed by Masao Minowa
16. Mystery Of The Golden Bird - 5/16/1993: written by Hirohisa Soda, directed by Masao Minowa
17. First Opening - JP Base - 5/23/1993: written by Junichi Miyashita, directed by Kaneharu Mitsumura
18. The Secret Story of Janperson's Birth - 5/30/1993: written by Junichi Miyashita, directed by Kaneharu Mitsumura
19. Mysterious Thief - Electromagnetic Transmission - 6/6/1993: written by Takahiko Masuda, directed by Michio Konishi
20. Ninpo Deathmatch - 6/13/1993: written by Kyoko Sagiyama, directed by Michio Konishi
21. Challenge - Gun Gibson, Carol, and Neo Guild Hitman - 6/20/1993: written by Junichi Miyashita, directed by Masao Minowa
22. Clash! Janperson V.S. Gun Gibson - 6/27/1993: written by Junichi Miyashita, directed by Masao Minowa
23. To Die For Justice - 7/4/1993: written by Junichi Miyashita, directed by Kaneharu Mitsumura
24. The History Upper Beginning - The Enemy Which Cannot Be Pushed Down - 7/11/1993: written by Nobuo Ogizawa, directed by Kaneharu Mitsumura
25. Battle Of The Quickest Gun Fighters - King Decisive Game - 07/18/1993: written by Akira Asaka, directed by Michio Konishi
26. A Fierce Car Battle - 7/25/1993: written by Naoyuki Sakai, directed by Michio Konishi
27. The True Face Of A Large Leader - 8/1/1993: written by Akira Asaka, directed by Masao Minowa
28. Tree Of Life, Shadow Warrior - 8/8/1993: written by Hirohisa Soda, directed by Masao Minowa
29. Death For The Androids - 8/15/1993: written by Mutsumi Nakano, directed by Kaneharu Mitsumura
30. Rupture - Last Soul 8/22/1993: written by Mutsumi Nakano, directed by Kaneharu Mitsumura
31. The Birth Of A New Janperson Model? - 8/29/1993: written by Junichi Miyashita, directed by Michio Konishi
32. The Labyrinth From Which It Can't Be Escaped - 9/5/1993: written by Junichi Miyashita, directed by Michio Konishi
33. Ardent Love Man Of Outer Space One - 9/12/1993: written by Hirohisa Soda, directed by Masao Minowa
34. Good Bye In Intense Fighting - 9/19/1993: written by Junichi Miyashita and Kazuhiro Inoue, directed by Masao Minowa
35. The Reckless Serafuku - 9/26/1993: written by Nobuo Ogizawa, directed by Kaneharu Mitsumura
36. Life It Does Shortly, The Beauty Boy - 10/3/1993: written by Kyoko Sagiyama, directed by Kaneharu Mitsumura
37. Justice vs. Love - 10/10/1993: written by Naoyuki Sakai and Nobuo Ogizawa, directed by Michio Konishi
38. Gun Gibson Scattered About - 10/17/1993: written by Nobuo Ogizawa, directed by Michio Konishi
39. Beautiful Woman Secretary Of Hell - 10/24/1993: Hirohisa Soda, directed by Masao Minowa
40. Base In Danger - Changing Illusion Crime Lord - 10/31/1993: written by Yasuko Kobayashi, directed by Masao Minowa
41. Decision Dead Sphere Of Thrust Trap - 11/14/1993: written by Kyoko Sagiyama, directed by Kaneharu Mitsumura
42. In The Heat Of Battle - 11/21/1993: written by Nobuo Ogizawa, directed by Kaneharu Mitsumura
43. The Last Super Fighter - 11/28/1993: written by Nobuo Ogizawa and Takahiko Masuda, directed by Michio Konishi
44. The Queen Who Burns! - 12/5/1993: written by Nobuo Ogizawa and Takahiko Masuda, directed by Michio Konishi
45. The Road To Death - 12/12/1993: written by Junichi Miyashita and Yasuyuki Suzuki, directed by Osamu Kaneda
46. Neo Guild's Last Battle! - 12/19/1993: written by Junichi Miyashita and Yasuyuki Suzuki, directed by Osamu Kaneda
47. Puzzle? Storm Of Betrayal - 12/26/1993: written by Junichi a Miyashita and Yasuyuki Suzuki, directed by Masao Minowa
48. JP Base's Destruction! - 1/9/1994: written by Junichi Miyashita and Yasuyuki Suzuki, directed by Masao Minowa
49. When Gun Gibson Goes Out In Flames - 1/16/1994: written by Junichi Miyashita, directed by Kaneharu Mitsumura
50. Janperson Forever - 1/23/1994: written by Junichi Miyashita, directed by Kaneharu Mitsumura

== Movies ==
- Tokusou Robo Janperson: The Movie - written by Junichi Miyashita, directed by Michio Konishi
- Toei Hero Daishugō (compilation of Janperson: The Movie, Blue SWAT: The Movie, and Super Sentai World) - written by Kyoko Sagiyama, directed by Katsuya Watanabe

== Songs ==
Opening theme

- "Tokusou Robo Janperson" (特捜ロボ ジャンパーソン, Tokusō Robo Janpāson)
  - Lyrics
    Keisuke Yamakawa
  - Composition
    Keisuke Hama (浜 圭介, Hama Keisuke)
  - Arrangement
    Kei Wakakusa (若草 恵, Wakakusa Kei)
  - Artist
    Susumu Ōya (大矢 晋, Ōya Susumu)

Ending theme

- "Asayake no Lullaby" (朝焼けのララバイ, Asayake no Rarabai; "Morning Lullaby")
  - Lyrics
    Keisuke Yamakawa
  - Composition
    Keisuke Hama
  - Arrangement
    Kei Wakakusa
  - Artist
    Susumu Ōya

The series background music is composed by Kei Wakakusa.

== Big Bad Beetleborgs ==
Janperson, Gun Gibson, and Bill Goldy made brief cameos in the "Convention Dimension" episode of Big Bad Beetleborgs as Karato, Silver Ray, and Goldex, respectively.

== International broadcasts and home video ==
- In its home country of Japan, the film was released on VHS as a rental in October 1993 and as a sell-through video on December of that same year, and also as a coupling with a Gosei Sentai Dairanger laserdisc released by Bandai. From March to September 1994, the entire series was released on VHS by Toei Video and spread throughout 13 volumes. The first and final volume contain 3 episodes, while volumes 2-12 contains 4 episodes each. The full series also received a full DVD release from November 21, 2009, until March 21, 2010, spread through five volumes with 2-discs in each volume. Each volume contains 10 episodes. Later on, all five DVD volumes were re-released as a low-priced edition on September 9, 2020.
- In late 2024, Janperson was licensed by Discotek Media for a Region 1 SD-Blu-ray release under the title Special Investigation Robo Janperson. This is their seventh consecutive release of a Metal Hero show following Juspion, Gavan, Sharivan, Jiban, Shaider, and Winspector. The Blu-ray will be available in spring of 2025.
- In Latin America, the series aired as Jumperson with a Spanish dub made in Mexico produced by Comarex. This was the third and final Metal Heroes series to air with a Latin Spanish dub.
- In the Philippines, it was aired on ABS-CBN in 1995 to 1997, dubbed in Filipino, and also premiered in ABC-5 (Today TV5) in 1998 to 2000 and HeroTV in YYYY to YYYY.
- In Indonesia, the series aired on Indosiar with an Indonesian dub in 1997.

== See also ==
- The Mobile Cop Jiban
- RoboCop
- Future Zone
- Future Force
