= Noboru Sugimura =

Japanese television and video game writer

- 杉村 升
- Born: June 28, 1948
- Died: February 25, 2005 (aged 56)
- Occupations: Television writer; video game writer
- Years active: 1975–2005
- Known for: Kyōryū Sentai Zyuranger; Ninja Sentai Kakuranger; Resident Evil 2; Resident Evil – Code: Veronica; Dino Crisis 2; Onimusha: Warlords; Devil May Cry; Onimusha 2: Samurai's Destiny; Clock Tower 3; Onimusha 3: Demon Siege; Haunting Ground

Noboru Sugimura (杉村 升, Sugimura Noboru; June 28, 1948 – February 25, 2005) was a Japanese television and video game writer best known for his work on the Metal Hero, Super Sentai, Resident Evil, Dino Crisis, and Onimusha series.

== Career ==
He had studied under Ei Ogawa, one of the main writers of the Japanese crime drama TV series Taiyō ni Hoero! that Sugimura was hired for in 1975 as well, marking his first job as a scenarist. Starting his own business, he went on to become the main writer of Sukeban Deka and the Metal Hero Series, and later created scenarios for Seibu Keisatsu, Lupin III Part II, Hadaka no Taishō and Kamen Rider Black.

A great fan of the original Resident Evil, Sugimura became involved with Capcom when he was introduced to Yoshiki Okamoto during the production of Resident Evil 2. Initially consulted on a trial basis, he ended up writing the complete story for the game and, together with Okamoto and two others, co-founded the now-defunct Capcom writers studio Flagship in April 1997 and would later work on other Capcom titles such as Clock Tower 3, Dino Crisis 2, Dino Stalker, Dino Crisis 3, and the first three main installments of the Onimusha series. Sugimura also created the draft script for Haunting Ground, which was a revised edition of a Resident Evil 4 script that had been rejected. This modified script was then transformed into the draft for Devil May Cry.

Sugimura died in 2005. Yoshiki Okamoto, who meanwhile founded Game Republic, said: "He was an extremely energetic person, and I thought that he would live a lot longer than me. [...] I had recently asked him to do a new script for an upcoming game from Game Republic and I was looking forward to working with him again".

== Screenwriting credits ==
• asterisk= head writer

=== Television ===
- Taiyō ni Hoero! (1974–1979)
- Emergency Line (1976)
- The Secret Inspectors (1976)
- The Unfettered Shogun (1978)
- Lupin the Third Part II (1978–1980)
- The Hangman (1980)
- Bakuso! Doberman Deka (1980)
- Seibu Keisatsu (1981)
- Choshichiro Edo Nikki (1983)
- Nebula Mask Machineman (1984)
- Kyodai Ken Byclosser (1985)
- Sukeban Deka (1985–1986)*
- Jikuu Senshi Spielban (1986)
- Kamen Rider Black (1987–1988)*
- Sekai Ninja Sen Jiraiya (1988)
- The Mobile Cop Jiban (1989–1990)*
- Special Rescue Police Winspector (1990–1991)*
- Super Rescue Solbrain (1991–1992)*
- Special Rescuers Exceedraft (1992–1993)*
- Kyōryū Sentai Zyuranger (1992–1993)*
- Gosei Sentai Dairanger (1993–1994)*
- Ninja Sentai Kakuranger (1994–1995)*
- Choriki Sentai Ohranger (1995–1996)*

=== Film ===
- Kamen Rider ZO (1993)
- Gosei Sentai Dairanger (1993)
- Ninja Sentai Kakuranger (1994)
