= Takayuki Miyauchi =

Japanese singer

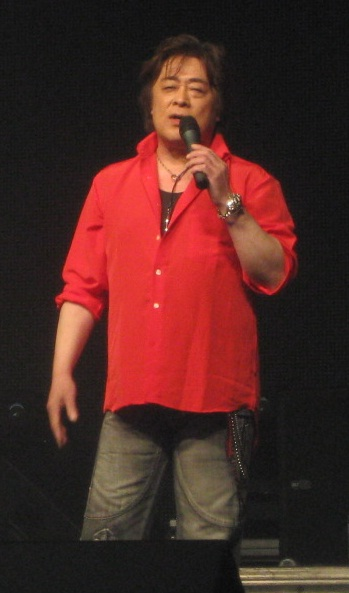
- Takayuki Miyauchi at Anime Friends 2010

Background information
- Born: February 4, 1955 (age 71)
- Origin: Ibaraki Prefecture, Japan
- Genres: Anison; J-pop; rock
- Occupation: Singer
- Instrument: Singing
- Years active: 1981–present
- Past members: Hiroshi Uchiyamada and Cool Five
- Website: miyauchi-office.com

Takayuki Miyauchi (宮内 タカユキ, Miyauchi Takayuki; born February 4, 1955), is a Japanese singer best known for his work on theme songs for tokusatsu and anime. A resident of Ibaraki Prefecture, he began his career as founding member and lead vocalist of the band "WHY" in 1981 before making his solo debut in 1984, singing the opening theme for the "Super Sentai" tokusatsu television series Choudenshi Bioman.

In the 1980s and 1990s, he would soon go on to be well known for a wide selection of tokusatsu music; notably a great number of insert themes contributed to Super Sentai series such as the opening for Choudenshi Bioman, as well as the opening and closing themes for Ginga Nagareboshi Gin and Kamen Rider Black RX and opening themes for the Metal Hero Series Tokkei Winspector, Tokkyuu Shirei Solbrain, and Tokusou Exceedraft. He has also contributed vocals for insert themes to the animated television series Kinnikuman, Galaxy Angel Z and The King of Braves GaoGaiGar.

== Discography ==
=== Tokusatsu ===
==== Choudenshi Bioman (1984) ====
- Super-Electronic Bioman (超電子バイオマン, Chōdenshi Baioman) (opening theme)
- Us Biomen (俺達バイオマン, Oretachi Baioman)
- Blue Togetherness
- Colourful Bioman (カラフル・バイオマン, Karafuru Baioman)
- Song of Bio Robo (バイオロボの歌, Baio Robo no Uta)
- Biomic Soldier (バイオミック・ソルジャー, Baiomikku Sorujā) (ending theme)
- From Sibling Rivalry: The Movie, he performed Choudenshi Bioman theme at DirecTV Arena, Springfield (Choudenshi Baioman) (live)

==== Uchuu Keiji Shaider (1984) ====
- Shaider Blue (シャイダー・ブルー, Shaidā Burū)

==== Choushinsei Flashman (1986) ====
- Shine! Flash King (輝け! フラッシュキング, Kagayake! Furasshu Kingu)
- Join the Beat Right Now (ビートをあわせて今すぐに, Bīto o Awasete Ima Sugu ni)
- Action No. 1 (アクションナンバー1, Akushon Nanbā Wan)

==== Jaaman Tanteidan Maringumi (1987) ====
- Three Generations of Jigoma (ジゴマIII世, Jigoma Sansei)

==== Kamen Rider Black RX (1988) ====
- Kamen Rider Black RX (仮面ライダーBlack RX, Kamen Raidā Burakku Aru Ekkusu) (opening theme)
- Warrior of Destiny (運命の戦士, Unmei no Senshi)
- Rider of the Battlefield, RX (戦場のライダーRX, Senjō no Raidā Aru Ekkusu)
- Everything is in Order to Love You (すべては君を愛するために, Subete wa Kimi o Ai Suru Tame ni)
- Warrior of Light (光の戦士, Hikari no Senshi)
- Charge, RX (激進RX, Gekishin Aru Ekkusu)
- Battle oh! RX (バトルoh! RX, Batoru ō! Aru Ekkusu)
- Somebody Loves You (誰かが君を愛してる, Dareka ga Kimi o Ai Shite 'ru) (ending theme)

==== Tokkei Winspector (1990) ====
- Special Police Winspector (特警ウインスペクター, Tokkei Uinsupekutā) (opening theme)
- Solar Warrior, Fire (太陽の勇者ファイヤー, Taiyō no Yūsha Faiyā)
- This Life Eternal (この命永遠に, Kono Inochi Eien ni)
- Beloved Earth, O Beloved Sea (愛する大地、愛する海よ, Ai Suru Daichi, Ai Suru Umi yo)
- Flames to the Future (炎は未来へ, Honō wa Mirai e)
- Let's Go! Fire Squad (レッツゴー! ファイヤースコード, Rettsu Gō! Faiyā Sukōdo)
- From Today's Me to Tomorrow's You (今日のおれからあしたの君へ, Kyō no Ore Kara Ashita no Kimi e) (ending theme)

==== Tokkyuu Shirei Solbrain (1991) ====
- Special Rescue Command Solbrain (特救指令ソルブレイン, Tokkyū Shirei Soruburein) (opening theme)
- Fighting SolMachine (ファイティング・ソルマシン, Faitingu Sorumashin)
- Mothership Solid States-1 (母艦ソリッドステイツ-1, Bokan Soriddo Suteitsu Wan)
- Bonds to Tomorrow (明日への絆, Ashita e no Kizuna)
- Adventure to the Heart (心に冒険を, Kokoro ni Bōken o)
- Marching! Solbrain (出動! ソルブレイン, Shutsudō! Soruburein)
- Head Forwards! (前へ出ろ!, Mae e Dero!)
- You, too, are Solbrain (君もソルブレイン, Kimi mo Soruburein)
- Embracing in Love (愛に抱かれて, Ai ni Dakarete) (ending theme)

==== Tokusou Exceedraft (1992) ====
- Special Investigation Exceedraft (特捜エクシードラフト, Tokusō Ekushīdorafuto) (opening theme)
- Implementation!! (実装!!, Jissō!!)
- That's Life (それは命, Sore wa Inochi)
- LAST FIGHTER
- One Life (生命はひとつ, Seimei wa Hitotsu)
- Knights Who Protect the Future (未来を守る騎士たち, Ashita o Mamoru Naito-tachi)
- Stir up a Storm! (嵐を巻きおこせ!, Arashi o Makiokose!)
- White Lightning! Barius 7 (白い稲妻! バリアス7, Shiroi Inazuma! Bariasu Sebun)
- Battle of Courage and Friendship (勇気と友情のバトル, Yūki to Yūjō no Batoru)
- Hurry, O Courage! (勇気よ急げ!, Yūki yo Isoge!)
- Exceedraft Grade up! (エクシードラフトGrade up!, Ekushīdorafuto Gurēdo Appu!)
- The Goal is the Future (ゴールは未来, Gōru wa Mirai) (ending theme)

==== Ninja Sentai Kakuranger (1994) ====
- Into Danger Kakuranger (イントゥデンジャーカクレンジャー, Intu Denjā Kakurenjā)
- O Stars, Don't Blur! (星よ、にじむな!, Hoshi yo, Nijimu na!)
- Let's Go as Ninja! Deden no Den (忍者でいこう! デデンのデン, Ninja de Ikou! Deden no Den)
- Invincible Shogun, Now Present! (無敵将軍、只今参上!, Muteki Shōgun, Tadaima Sanjō!)

==== B-Robo Kabutack (1997) ====
- Ah, Star Piece (ああ、スターピース, Aa, Sutā Pīsu)*

==== Seijuu Sentai Gingaman (1998) ====
- Ruler of the Galaxy, Gingaioh (銀河の王者ギンガイオー, Ginga no Ōja Gingaiō)
- Giga Rhinos! Giga Phoenix! Giga Bitus! (ギガライノス! ギガフェニックス! ギガバイタス!, Giga Rainosu! Giga Fenikkusu! Giga Baitasu!)

==== Kyuukyuu Sentai GoGo-V (1999) ====
- Run, Go Liner! Save, 9 9 Machines! (走れゴーライナー! 救え99マシン!, Hashire Gō Rainā! Sukue Kyū Kyū Mashin!)
- STOP THE WARS

==== Mirai Sentai Timeranger (2000) ====
- Millennium Warriors (1000年戦士, Sennen Senshi)

==== GoGo Sentai Boukenger (2006) ====
- Rumbling Fusion! DaiBouken!! (轟轟合体! ダイボウケン!!, Gōgō Gattai! DaiBōken!!)
- Legends (伝説, Densetsu) with Akira Kushida & MoJo for GoGo Sentai Boukenger vs. Super Sentai

==== Juken Sentai Gekiranger (2007) ====
- Burn! Gekijuken! (燃えよ激獣拳!, Moe yo Gekijūken!)"

==== Engine Sentai Go-onger (2008) ====
- G9! Tune Up (G9！チューンナップ, Jī Nain! Chūn Appu)

==== Crusher Kazuyoshi: Ikare! (2009) ====
- Fire (炎, Honō)

==== Jikuu Senshi Ibaliger R (2009) ====
- Dimension Soldier Ibaliger R (時空戦士 イバライガーR, Jikū Senshi Ibaraiga Aru) (opening theme)

==== Samurai Sentai Shinkenger (2009) ====
- Samurai Transformation Daikai-Oh (侍変形！ダイカイオー, Samurai Henkei! Daikaiō)

==== Tensou Sentai Goseiger (2010) ====
- Gosei Knight Will Not Allow It (ゴセイナイトは許さない, Gosei Naito wa Yurusanai)

==== Kaizoku Sentai Gokaiger (2011) ====
- Courageous People ~Theme of the Space Pirates~ (海賊(つわもの)たち～宇宙海賊のテーマ～, Tsuwamono-tachi ~Uchū Kaizoku no Tēma~?)

=== Anime ===
==== Kinnikuman (1983) ====
- Berlin no Akai Ame ("Red Rain of Berlin", Brocken Jr.'s image song)
- Akuma no Mougyuu ("Devil Buffalo", Buffaloman's image song)
- Jigoku no Sanmyaku ("Hellish Mountains", The Mountain's image song)
- Fukumen no Kariudo ("Mask Hunter", Big The Budo's image song)
- Kyoufu no Kaiten Drill ("Dreaded Spinning Drill", Screw Kid's image song)
- Moero! Housou Seki ("Burn! Announcer Chair", Yoshigai and Nakano-san's image song)

==== Yume Senshi Wingman (1984) ====
- Aku! Retsu! Wingman
- Shook! Wingman
- Desire

==== Video Senshi Laserion (1984) ====
- Video Senshi Laserion (opening theme)
- Hikari no Sekai
- We're ready

==== Kochira Katsushika-ku Kameari Kōen-mae Hashutsujo (film; 1985) ====
- Hashutsujo no Yoru wa fukete
- Policeman wa Tsuyoi zo!

==== Dragon Ball (1986) ====
- Red Ribbon Army (レッドリボンアーミー)

==== Ginga: Nagareboshi Gin (1986) ====
- Nagareboshi Gin ("Shooting Star Gin", opening theme)
- Shouri no Uta ("Song of Triumph")
- Kokoro no Kiba ("Fangs of the Heart")
- FIRE
- Hoero Gin ("Howling Gin")
- Otoko-Tachi, Nakama-Tachi ("The men were allies")
- TOMORROW (ending theme)

==== Kamen no Ninga Akakage (1987) ====
- Kuroi Takurami

==== Kidou Keisatsu Patlabor (OVA, 1988) ====
- Kidou Keisatsu Patlabor

==== Shōnan Bakusōzoku 5: Aozameta Akatsuki (1989) ====
- COOL RIDER

==== Casshern (OVA, 1993) ====
- Kibou Shigosen ~Horizon Blue~

==== Mach Go Go Go (1997) ====
- Great Devil Exerion

==== The King of Braves GaoGaiGar (1997) ====
- Saikyo Yuusha Robo Gundan ("Strongest Brave Robot Corps")

==== Galaxy Angel Z (2002) ====
- Tatakae! Our XXX

==== Galaxy Angel A/AA (2002/2003) ====
- Tatakae! Angel Five

=== Other ===
==== Akane Maniax ====
- Tekkumen no Uta / Song of Tekkumen (テックメンの歌)

==== GR Chouzetsu Gattai SRD ====
- Otoko do Ahou Kazoe Uta (男どアホウ数え唄)

==== Game Tengoku ====
- Tatakae! Washidake no Mutekinder Z (戦え!わしだけのムテキンダーZ)

==== GUN Bare! Game Tengoku ====
- Washi ga Seishun no Muteki Wing (わしが青春のムテキウイング)

==== Maajan Mokushiroku ====
- THE GREAT MANG-GANG

==== Tech Romancer ====
- Kimi wo Sagasu Tsubasa (君を探す翼)
- Stand Up! Soldiers ~Erabare Shishia-Tachi~ (Stand Up! Soldiers~選ばれし者たち~[Giant Fighter])

==== Uchuu Eiyuu Monogatari ====
- Astronauts ~ Uchuu Hikoushi No Ballad (Astronauts～宇宙飛行士のバラード)
