= Yoshio Kawai =

Japanese voice actor

Yoshio Kawai (河合 義雄, Kawai Yoshio; born March 27, 1954) is a Japanese voice actor from Tokyo, Japan.

== Filmography ==
=== Anime television series ===
- The Brave Fighter of Legend Da-Garn (Mach Lander)
- Captain Tsubasa (Kōzō Kira)
- Geneshaft (Asimov)
- Kakyūsei (Dogeza Master)
- Macross (Matsuki)
- Mobile Fighter G Gundam (Kennedy Grahman)
- Rockman.EXE Stream (Bengel)
- Slam Dunk (Aiwa Academy Coach)
- The Super Dimension Fortress Macross (Haruaki Matsumoto)
- Tenchi Universe (Tetta)
- Urotsukidoji (Airplane Pilot, Gashim, Caeser's Colleague, Cop)

=== Video games ===
- Summon Night (Sutauto, Guramusu Bānetto)

=== Tokusatsu ===
- Hikari Sentai Maskman (1987) (Skull Doguler (ep. 5))
- Choujuu Sentai Liveman (1988) (Hihi Zuno (ep. 11))
- Kousoku Sentai Turboranger (1989) (Inugami Boma (ep. 25))
- Chikyu Sentai Fiveman (1990) (Torarugin (ep. 3), Galactic Ninja Batzlergin (ep. 24), Samejigokugin (ep. 34), Kamerezarugin (ep. 41), TeranoTVgin (ep. 43))
- Tokkyuu Shirei Solbrain (1991) (Para brain A320 (ep. 1))
- Choujin Sentai Jetman (1991) (Majin Mu (ep. 30))
- Kyōryū Sentai Zyuranger (1992) (Dora Skeleton (ep. 2), Dora Goblin (ep. 7), Dora Ladon (ep. 13), Dora Chimaera (ep. 44))
- Ninja Sentai Kakuranger (1994) (Umibouzu (ep. 23))
- Ninja Sentai Kakuranger Movie (1994) (Ōnyūdō)
- Blue SWAT (1994) (Zazanga (ep. 21), Gedon (ep. 31))
- Chouriki Sentai Ohranger (1995) (Bara Tarantula (ep. 29))
- Mirai Sentai Timeranger (2000) (Saboteur Mayden (ep. 37))
- Ninpuu Sentai Hurricanger (2002) (Island Ninja Girigrigaishi (ep. 17))
