= Metal Hero Series =

Metaseries of tokusatsu superhero TV series

- Created by: Saburo Yatsude; Susumu Yoshikawa
- Original work: Space Sheriff Gavan
- Owner: Toei Company
- Years: 1982–present (hiatus since 1999)

Films and television
- Television series: See below

Games
- Traditional: Rangers Strike
- Video game: The Space Sheriff Spirits

Miscellaneous
- Toys: Souchaku Henshin Series; S.H. Figuarts

The Metal Hero Series (メタルヒーローシリーズ, Metaru Hīrō Shirīzu) is a metaseries of tokusatsu superhero TV series produced by Toei for Japanese television.

The protagonists of the Metal Hero Series are mainly space, military and police-based characters who are typically either androids, cyborgs, or humans wearing metallic armored suits. Henceforth, most of the Metal Heroes are also referenced as another example of the "Henshin (transforming) Heroes" genre. Usually, the genre revolves around a technological theme where technology, in the right hands, can be used for the greater good.

The shows were produced by Toei from 1982 through 1999 in conjunction with their other Tokusatsu superhero shows, Kamen Rider and Super Sentai. Initially only the series released between 1985 and 1989 (Juspion, Spielban, Metalder, Jiraiya and Jiban) were considered part of the Metal Hero franchise while Gavan, Sharivan and Shaider were part of the Space Sheriff franchise and Winspector, Solbrain and Exceedraft were part of the Rescue Police franchise. It was only in late-1990s that Toei Company incorporated the Space Sheriff and Rescue Police trilogies as subseries of the Metal Hero. Blue SWAT, Janperson, B-Fighter, B-Fighter Kabuto, Kabutack and Robotack were also incorporated into the franchise afterwards.

In addition to Japan, they are also popular in France, Brazil, the Philippines, Thailand, Malaysia and Indonesia. During the 1990s, Saban Entertainment used some of the shows to produce programs similar to their Power Rangers series. Some of the Metal Hero Series even spawned such sequels which followed the continuity of the previous shows, resulting in the genre developing sub-categories based mainly on space, military and police-related characters.

== Main series ==
#	Year	Title	Full title		No. of Episodes	Subseries	American counterpart
#	Year	Title	Japanese	International	No. of Episodes	Subseries	American counterpart
1	1982	Gavan	宇宙刑事ギャバン; Uchū Keiji Gyaban	Space Sheriff Gavan	44	Space Sheriffs	
2	1983	Sharivan	宇宙刑事シャリバン; Uchū Keiji Shariban	Space Sheriff Sharivan	51	Space Sheriffs	
3	1984	Shaider	宇宙刑事シャイダー; Uchū Keiji Shaidā	Space Sheriff Shaider	49	Space Sheriffs	VR Troopers
4	1985	Juspion	巨獣特捜ジャスピオン; Kyojū Tokusō Jasupion	Mega-Beast Investigator Juspion	46		
5	1986	Spielban	時空戦士スピルバン; Jikū Senshi Supiruban	Dimensional Warrior Spielban	44		VR Troopers
6	1987	Metalder	超人機メタルダー; Chōjinki Metarudā	Super Android Metalder	39		VR Troopers
7	1988	Jiraiya	世界忍者戦ジライヤ; Sekai Ninja Sen Jiraiya (Note: Lit. trans. "Jiraiya of the World Ninja War")	Olympic Ninja Jiraiya	50		
8	1989	Jiban	機動刑事ジバン; Kidō Keiji Jiban	The Mobile Cop Jiban	52		
9	1990	Winspector	特警ウインスペクター; Tokkei Uinsupekutā (Note: Lit. trans. "Special Police Winspector")	Special Rescue Police Winspector	49	Rescue Police	
10	1991	Solbrain	特救指令ソルブレイン; Tokkyū Shirei Soruburein (Note: Lit. trans. "Special Rescue Command Solbrain")	Super Rescue Solbrain	53	Rescue Police	
11	1992	Exceedraft	特捜エクシードラフト; Tokusō Ekushīdorafuto (Note: Lit. trans. "Special Investigators Exceedraft")	Special Rescue Exceedraft	49	Rescue Police	
12	1993	Janperson	特捜ロボジャンパーソン; Tokusō Robo Janpāson	Robot Investigator Janperson	50		
13	1994	Blue SWAT	ブルースワット; Burū Suwatto	Blue SWAT	51		
14	1995	B-Fighter	重甲ビーファイター; Jūkō Bī Faitā (Note: Lit. trans. "Heavyshell B-Fighter")	Beetle Fighter	53	Beetle Fighters	Big Bad Beetleborgs
15	1996	B-Fighter Kabuto	ビーファイターカブト; Bī Faitā Kabuto	Beetle Fighter Kabuto	50	Beetle Fighters	Beetleborgs Metallix
16	1997	Kabutack	ビーロボカブタック; Bī Robo Kabutakku	B-Robo Kabutack	52		
17	1998	Robotack	テツワン探偵ロボタック; Tetsuwan Tantei Robotakku	Ironclad Detective Robotack	45		

=== Staff ===
#	Title	Series director	Head writer	Music composer
	Gavan	Yoshiaki Kobayashi	Shozo Uehara	Chumei Watanabe
	Sharivan	Yoshiaki Kobayashi	Shozo Uehara	Chumei Watanabe
	Shaider	Shinichiro Sawai	Shozo Uehara	Chumei Watanabe
	Juspion	Yoshiaki Kobayashi	Shozo Uehara	Chumei Watanabe
	Spielban	Makoto Tsuji	Shozo Uehara	Chumei Watanabe
	Metalder	Takeshi Ogasawara	Susumu Takaku	Seiji Yokoyama
	Jiraiya	Makoto Tsuji	Akira Nakahara	Kei Wakakusa
	Jiban	Michio Konishi	Noboru Sugimura	Chumei Watanabe
	Winspector	Shohei Tojo	Noboru Sugimura	Seiji Yokoyama
	Solbrain	Masao Minowa	Noboru Sugimura	Kaoru Mizuki
	Exceedraft	Kaneharu Mitsumura	Noboru Sugimura	Kaoru Mizuki
	Janperson	Michio Konishi	Junichi Miyashita	Kei Wakakusa
	Blue SWAT	Makoto Tsuji	Junichi Miyashita	Kei Wakakusa
	B-Fighter	Shinichiro Sawai	Junichi Miyashita	Eiji Kawamura
	B-Fighter Kabuto	Shohei Tojo	Junichi Miyashita	Eiji Kawamura
	Kabutack	Taro Sakamoto	Takashi Yamada	Katsunori Ishida
	Robotack	Katsuya Watanabe	Takashi Yamada	Kei Wakakusa

== Theatrical releases ==
- 1984: Uchuu Keiji Shaider: The Movie
- 1984: Uchuu Keiji Shaider: Pursuit! The Strange Kidnappers!
- 1987: Choujinki Metalder: The Movie
- 1989: Kidou Keiji Jiban: The Movie Great Explosion at the Monster Factory of Fear
- 1993: Tokusou Robo Janperson
- 1994: Blue SWAT: The Movie
- 1995: Juukou B-Fighter: The Movie
- 2012: Kaizoku Sentai Gokaiger vs. Space Sheriff Gavan: The Movie
- 2012: Space Sheriff Gavan: The Movie
- 2013: Kamen Rider × Super Sentai × Space Sheriff: Super Hero Taisen Z

=== V-Cinema releases ===
- 1998: B-Robo Kabutack: The Epic Christmas Battle
- 1999: Tetsuwan Tantei Robotack and Kabutack: The Great Strange Country Adventure
- 2014: Space Sheriff Sharivan: The Next Generation
- 2014: Space Sheriff Shaider: The Next Generation
- 2017: Space Squad: Gavan vs. Dekaranger
- 2017: Girls in Trouble: Space Squad Episode Zero
- 2018: Uchu Sentai Kyuranger vs. Space Squad

=== Televi Magazine Super Video/Special DVD ===
- Tokumei Sentai Go-Busters vs. Beet Buster vs. J
- Space Sheriff Gavan Special DVD

== International adaptations ==
=== United States ===
During the 1990s, Saban adapted Metal Hero Series shows for American audiences; stock footage from Metalder, Spielvan and Shaider was used in VR Troopers (1994–1996), and footage from both B-Fighter series was later used in Big Bad Beetleborgs. Both shows ran for two seasons. As of 2018, Discotek Media has licensed Juspion for release marking the first release of the Metal Heroes in the US. Both Jiraiya and Gavan were used for the Power Rangers franchise with Jiraiya as Sheriff Skyfire in Power Rangers Super Ninja Steel and Gavan as Captain Chaku in Power Rangers Beast Morphers.

=== Philippines ===
Zaido: Pulis Pangkalawakan was greenlighted by Toei as a sequel to Shaider, with characters who are descendants of those in the original series. Toei later halted production, instead authorizing a spin-off series set 20 years after the end of Shaider.

== Current status ==
Other similar heroes, such as Nebula Mask Machine Man, Kyodai Ken Byclosser, Lady Battle Cop, and Choukou Senshi Changéríon, were also produced during the time that the Metal Hero Series were on the air, but are not included as part of the Metal Hero Series for various reasons. Machine Man and Bicrosser were created by Shotaro Ishinomori, while Changéríon's armor is not metallic and aired on TV Tokyo. It is unknown if Lady Battle Cop is part of Toei's shared universe.

The Metal Hero Series was discontinued in 1999, as the company rather favors the Super Sentai and Kamen Rider Series of shows, allegedly due to the passing of Shotaro Ishinomori. However, many of the traits of the series have been adopted into the newer installations of the Super Sentai and Kamen Rider shows. Today, the present versions of this type of heroes are also merged in with the Henshin Heroes description.

Some Metal Heroes have also made cameo appearances. In 2004, a special Tokusou Sentai Dekaranger stage show had a special appearance by Gavan, who assisted Hurricane Red from Ninpuu Sentai Hurricaneger and Aba Red from Bakuryuu Sentai Abaranger in battling various Alienizer monsters from Deka Ranger.

In 2005, Toei released some Uchuu Keiji trilogy merchandise. Later that year, Bandai released a "Souchaku Henshin" figure of Gavan, followed by "Souchaku Henshin" figures of Sharivan and Shaider in early 2006. In May 2006, a PlayStation 2 video game titled The Space Sheriff Spirits was released. The game featured Gavan, Sharivan and Shaider all teaming up to battle past enemies from their series. In early 2008, the trading card company Cardass announced a new, Metal Heroes based expansion to their Rangers Strike card game, entitled Special Metal Edition, featuring characters and vehicles from the various Metal Hero Series for use within the game.

Space Sheriff Series re-emerged in the 2010s with feature films, including new actors portraying successors to Gavan, Sharivan, and Shaider. Some of them are stand alone entries, while others feature crossovers with other Super Sentai and Kamen Rider characters. As a part of Toei's Project R.E.D., the series will mark a return in 2026 with Super Space Sheriff Gavan Infinity, a new television series drawing heavy inspiration from the original Space Sheriff trilogy.
