= Super Rescue Solbrain =

- The title card for Super Rescue Solbrain
- Tokyuu Shirei Solbrain
- Genre: Tokusatsu; Superhero fiction Science fiction
- Created by: Saburō Yatsude
- Developed by: Noboru Sugimura
- Directed by: Masao Minowa
- Starring: Kōichi Nakayama; Mitsue Mori; Masaru Yamashita; Hiroshi Miyauchi; Hinenori Iura
- Voices of: Seizō Katō
- Narrated by: Takeshi Kuwabara
- Composer: Kaoru Mizuki
- Country of origin: Japan
- No. of episodes: 53

Production
- Running time: 25 minutes
- Production companies: Toei Company; Asatsu-DK

Original release
- Network: TV Asahi (ANN)
- Release: January 20, 1991 – January 26, 1992

Related
- Special Rescue Police Winspector; Special Rescue Exceedraft

Super Rescue Solbrain (特救指令ソルブレイン, Tokkyū Shirei Soruburein; lit. Special Rescue Command Solbrain) is a Japanese tokusatsu television series produced by Toei Company. It ran for 53 episodes from January 20, 1991, to January 26, 1992, on TV Asahi. It is part of the Metal Hero Series franchise; a sequel to Special Rescue Police Winspector, it is the second installment in the Rescue Police Series trilogy.

For distribution purposes, Toei refers to this television series as simply Solbrain.

== Plot ==
After the Winspector police team leaves Japan to fight crime in France, Chief Shunsuke Masaki realizes he must create a new police team to defend Tokyo from crime. He creates Solbrain – a high-tech special rescue force, expert in missions requiring rescue and firepower. Its leader is Daiki Nishio, a rookie detective who can use the Plus Up command in his car to transform into SolBraver. Other members are Reiko Higuchi, also able to use the Plus Up command to transform into SolJeanne, SolBraver's female counterpart; and SolDozer, a yellow bulldozer robot. Later in the series, the Winspector team returns to Japan and teams up with Solbrain for a three-part story (episodes 21-23). From episode 34 on, Ryouma, the protagonist from Winspector, returns as a member of Solbrain, wearing a suit dubbed the Knight Fire.

== The team ==
- Daiki Nishio/SolBraver (西尾 大樹/ソルブレイバー, Nishio Daiki/Sorubureibā): Ryoma's successor. He wears blue armor, and his primary vehicle is SolGallop. He only can wear his solid suit, and his transformation call is "Plus Up" (プラスアップ, Purasu Appu). He is armed with Cerberus Delta (a triangular gun), which can transform into a rod or a sword.
- Reiko Higuchi/SolJeanne (樋口 玲子/ソルジャンヌ, Higuchi Reiko/Sorujannu): Junko's successor. She wears red armor, a black-and-white flameproof suit and a helmet without a mouthplate (so she can wear also an oxygen mask). Her primary vehicle is SolDrecker, which also carries Dozer. Her transformation call is also "Plus Up" (プラスアップ, Purasu Appu), and her weapon is a small gun.
- SolDozer (ソルドーザー, Sorudōzā): Bikel and Walter's successor. He is a yellow heavy-duty robot (with design elements from a bulldozer, as the name implies) and can transform into a rescue machine.

=== Other members ===
- Jun Masuda (増田 純, Masuda Jun): A Solbrain member, unlike Daiki and Reiko he does not wear a solid suit; however, he is always in action.
- Shunsuke Masaki (正木 俊介, Masaki Shunsuke): Chief of Solbrain. Compassionate and dedicated, he usually goes into the battlefield to help his subordinates.
- Kamekichi Togawa (戸川 亀吉, Togawa Kamekichi): A machine expert, he is Nonoyama's successor.
- Takeshi Yazawa (矢沢 武, Yazawa Takeshi): A pilot of the mothership Solid States-I, he leads the mothership's operating team and is senior to Daiki.
- Midori Aikawa (相川 みどり, Aikawa Midori): Solbrain's Operation's team leader, she sees computer literacy as a main duty.
- Ryoma Kagawa/(Knight) Fire (香川 竜馬/(ナイト) ファイヤー, Kagawa Ryōma/(Naito) Faiyā): Winspector's former leader, he first reappears in episode 21 with the Winspector team (robots Bikel and Walter) chasing an android named Messiah. He later transformed into Fire and helped the team with Bikel and Walter. Later returns in episode 34 as Knight Fire, a new member of Solbrain, armed with Cerberus Delta and Pile Tornado. He is portrayed by Masaru Yamashita, reprising his role from the previous Metal Hero series.
- Cross 8000 (クロス8000, Kurosu hassen): Solbrain's supercomputer, and Madocks' successor.

== Arsenal ==
- Solid Suit (ソリッドスーツ, Soriddo Sūtsu): Daiki, Reiko, and Ryōma's armor.
- Proto Suit ( プロトスーツ, Puroto Suutsu ? ) The prototype of SolBraver's Solid Suit, Katsuhito Sasamoto (笹本勝彦, Sasamoto Katsuhito) steals the armor to destroy SolBraver, but the armor had a timeout, similar to the Crush Tector's 5 minute time limit. Sasamoto was known as a psychotic person who had no qualifications to become the SolBraver.
- SolGallop (ソルギャロップ, Soru Gyaroppu): Daiki's car, based on the Toyota Sera
- SolDrecker (ソルドレッカー, Soru Dorekkā): Reiko's car, sometimes also driven by Jun. Based on the Toyota Previa
- Knight custom (ナイトカスタム, Naito Kasutamu): Ryōma's car, based on the Mazda RX-7 FC
- Masaki's undercover car: Chief Masaki's car. Initially, a Third-Generation Mazda Luce seen on Winspector, but in mid-series changed to a Mazda Persona.
- Winsquad Stock-type (市販車型ウインスコード, Shihansha-gata Uinsukōdo): In the episode 21, when Ryoma chases an android, he drives this car, a tenth generation Cadillac Eldorado with all the equipment and transformation mechanisms installed inside the car.
- Solid States I (ソリッドステイツI, Soriddo Suteitsu wan): the mothership (abbreviated S.S.-I (エスエスワン, Esu Esu Wan)). S.S.-I takes off from Solid Hanger (ソリッドハンガー, Soriddo Hangā) in one minute.
- Cerberus Delta (ケルベロスΔ, Keruberosu Deruta): SolBraver and Knight Fire's weapon. It has two operating modes: Shot Mode (ショットモード, Shotto Mōdo) (used as a ray gun) and Slash Mode (スラッシュモード, Surasshu Mōdo) (used, as a sword, to break obstacles such as girders and fighting enemies armed with knives).
- BosWinder (ボスワインダー, Bosu Waindā): a tool which shoots a special carbon-fiber rope or a special bullet
- SolIndicater (ソルインジケーター, Soru Injikētā): Daiki and Reiko's police license
- O2 Pack (O2パック, Ō tsū Pakku): oxygen cylinder
- Medical Pack (メディカルパック, Medikaru Pakku): emergency equipment used by SolJeanne
- Cuffs Lock (カフスロック, Kafusu Rokku): handcuffs
- GigaStreamer (ギガストリーマー, Giga sutorīmā): the only weapon Solbrain inherited from Winspector (see Tokkei Winspector for details).
- Pile Tornado (パイルトルネード, Pairu Torunēdo): SolBraver and Knight Fire's big gun, with three functions:
  - Super Discharger (スーパーディスチャージャー, Super Disuchājā): shoots a fire-extinguishing beam
  - Caulking Puncher (コーキングパンチャー, Kōkingu Panchā): shoots a special gelatinous, gluey, freezing bullet
  - Tornado Burst (トルネードバースト, Torunēdo bāsuto): a hail of 40 plasma-energy bullets per second, fired by Cerberus Delta. Its power is two times that of GigaStreamer's maximum mode (when SolBraver and Knight Fire fire it at the same time, its power is four times GigaStreamer's).

== Episodes ==
1. Tokyo Skies' SOS (東京上空SOS, Tōkyō Jōkū Esu Ō Esu): written by Noboru Sugimura, directed by Masao Minowa
2. The Explosive ESP Sisters (爆襲!エスパー姉妹, Bakushū! Esupā Shimai): written by Noboru Sugimura, directed by Masao Minowa
3. Is Father an Angel or a Devil? (父は天使か怪物か, Chichi wa Tenshi ka Kaibutsu ka): written by Noboru Sugimura, directed by Michio Konishi
4. The Game-Software of Dreams (夢のゲームソフト, Yume no Gēmu Sofuto): written by Noboru Sugimura, directed by Michio Konishi
5. The Mutant's Courage (怪人のくれた勇気, Kaijin no kureta yūki): written by Takahiko Masuda, directed by Takeshi Ogasawara
6. The Storyteller and the Bomb (バクダンと落語家, Bakudan to Rakugoka): written by Nobuo Ogizawa, directed by Takeshi Ogasawara
7. The Reincarnated Human Machine (人間再生マシーン, Ningen Saisei Mashīn): written by Kyoko Sagiyama, directed by Kaneharu Mitsumura
8. The Vanishing Power-Suit (消えた強化スーツ, Kieta Kyōka Sūtsu): written by Takashi Yamada, directed by Kaneharu Mitsumura
9. Father and Daughter's Red Bond (父と娘の赤い絆, Chichi to Ko no Akai Kizuna): written by Junichi Miyashita, directed by Michio Konishi
10. The Naive Arson Team (わしら純情放火団, Washira Junjō Hōkadan): written by Nobuo Ogizawa, directed by Michio Konishi
11. The Elegy of Love and Revenge (愛と復讐の挽歌, Ai to Fukushū no Banka): written by Takahiko Masuda, directed by Takeshi Ogasawara
12. Birth! The New Dozer (誕生!新ドーザー, Tanjō! Shin Dōzā): written by Noboru Sugimura, directed by Takeshi Ogasawara
13. Murder Playback (殺人プレイバック, Satsujin Pureibakku): written by Noboru Sugimura, directed by Kiyoshi Arai
14. The Love-Calling Bullet (愛を呼ぶ銃弾, Ai o Yobu Jūdan): written by Takashi Yamada, directed by Kiyoshi Arai
15. The Dove Doll (人形は平和の使者, Ningyō wa Heiwa no Shisha): written by Susumu Takaku, directed by Michio Konishi
16. The Disappearance of Mothership S.S.-I (母艦S.S.-I消失, Bokan Esu Esu Wan Shōshitsu): written by Noboru Sugimura, directed by Michio Konishi
17. Escape in Handcuffs (手錠のままの脱走, Tejō no Mama no Dassō): written by Junichi Miyashita, directed by Takeshi Ogasawara
18. Bicycling for Tomorrow (明日に走る自転車, Ashita ni Hashiru Jitensha): written by Kyoko Sagiyama, directed by Takeshi Ogasawara
19. Kame-chan and the Detective Girl (亀ちゃんと探偵娘, Kamechan to Tantei Musume): written by Nobuo Ogizawa, directed by Hidenori Ishida
20. Shoot the Handcuffs of Tears (涙の手錠を打て, Namida no Tejō o Ute): written by Takashi Yamada, directed by Hidenori Ishida
21. The Returned Winspector (part one) (帰ってきたWSP(PART-I), Kaettekita Uinsupekutā (Pāto Wan)): written by Noboru Sugimura, directed by Kaneharu Mitsumura
22. Heartless Fire (part two) (非情のファイヤー(PART-II), Hijō no Faiya (Pāto Tsū)): written by Noboru Sugimura, directed by Kaneharu Mitsumura
23. From Ryōma to Daiki (part three) (竜馬から大樹へ(PART-III), Ryōma kara daiki e (Pāto Surī)): written by Noboru Sugimura, directed by Kaneharu Mitsumura
24. Rescue the Goshawk (オオタカをすくえ, Ōtaka o Sukue): written by Susumu Takaku, directed by Michio Konishi
25. The Gigantic Mothership Response (巨大母艦応答せよ, Kyodai Bokan Otō seyo): written by Noboru Sugimura, directed by Takeshi Ogasawara
26. The Trap-Setting Detective (罠をしかけた刑事, Wana o Shikaketa Keiji): written by Nobuo Ogizawa, directed by Michio Konishi
27. The Story Plant's Secret (お話し植物の秘密, Ohanashi Shokubutsu no Himitsu): written by Kyoko Sagiyama, directed by Takeshi Ogasawara
28. Hurry! Mothership of Life (急げ!命の母艦, Isoge! Inochi no Bokan): written by Noboru Sugimura, directed by Kaneharu Mitsumura
29. The Revolt of the Children's Empire (子供帝国の反乱, Kodomo Teikoku no Hanran): written by Takashi Yamada, directed by Kaneharu Mitsumura
30. God is Painful! (神様はつらいよ, Kamisama wa Tsurai yo!): written by Nobuo Ogizawa, directed by Michio Konishi
31. She is a Dream Future Car (彼女は夢の未来車, Kanojo wa Yume no Mirai Kā): written by Nobuo Ogizawa, directed by Michio Konishi
32. Pursue the Murderer Policeman (警官殺人を追え, Keikan Satsujin o Oe): written by Susumu Takaku, directed by Takeshi Ogasawara
33. When the Hero Cries (勇者が涙を流すとき, Yūsha ga Namida o Nagasu Toki): written by Junichi Miyashita, directed by Takeshi Ogasawara
34. New Hero to Kyushu! (part one) (新英雄九州へ!I, Nyū Hīrō Kyūshū e! Pāto Wan): written by Noboru Sugimura, directed by Michio Konishi
35. New Hero to Kyushu! (part two) (新英雄九州へ!II, Nyū Hīrō Kyūshū e! Pāto Tsū): written by Noboru Sugimura, directed by Michio Konishi
36. The Kidnapper is the Commanding Officer! (誘拐犯は隊長!, Yūkaihan wa Taichō!): written by Noboru Sugimura, directed by Kaneharu Mitsumura
37. The Sad Hitman (哀しいヒットマン, Kanashii Hittoman): written by Junichi Miyashita, directed by Kaneharu Mitsumura
38. The Devil Whispers Death (死をささやく悪霊, Shi o Sasayaku Akuryō): written by Susumu Takaku, directed by Takeshi Ogasawara
39. The Space Alien who Delivered the Dream (夢を届けた宇宙人, Yume o Todoketa Uchūjin): written by Kyoko Sagiyama, directed by Takeshi Ogasawara
40. Trap the Hero (英雄を罠にかけろ, Hīrō o Wana ni Kakero): written by Noboru Sugimura, directed by Kaneharu Mitsumura
41. Clash! High Speed Machines (激突!高速マシン, Gekitotsu! Kosoku Mashin): written by Takahiko Masuda, directed by Kaneharu Mitsumura
42. Oath of Revenge in Hand (グラブに誓う復讐, Gurabu ni Chikau Fukushū): written by Junichi Miyashita and Yasuyuki Suzuki, directed by Michio Konishi
43. The Woman with Two Faces (二つの顔を持つ女, Futatsu no Kao o Motsu Onna): written by Noboru Sugimura, directed by Michio Konishi
44. The Thief and the Old Doctor (コソ泥と老博士, Kosodoro to Rō Hakase): written by Nobuo Ogizawa, directed by Takeshi Ogasawara
45. The Target is the Small Witness (標的は小さな証人, Hyōteki wa Chiisa na Shōnin): written by Junichi Miyashita and Yasuyuki Suzuki, directed by Takeshi Ogasawara
46. The Ingenious Time Machine (瞬間天才製造器, Shunkan Tensai Seizōki): written by Noboru Sugimura, directed by Kaneharu Mitsumura
47. Digression! The Divine Investigation Team (脱線!占い捜査隊, Dassen! Uranai Sōsatai): written by Nobuo Ogizawa, directed by Kaneharu Mitsumura
48. Today Without Papa Again (今日もいないパパ, Kyō mo Inai Papa): written by Kyoko Sagiyama, directed by Michio Konishi
49. Love Her! The Bad Child (大好き!悪い子, Daisuki! Waruiko): written by Noboru Sugimura and Akiko Asatsuke, directed by Michio Konishi
50. The Devil-Dog's Birth of Hope (希望を生んだ魔犬, Kibō o Unda Maken): written by Mayumi Ishiyama and Junichi Miyashita, directed by Takeshi Ogasawara
51. Special Rescue: Breakup Order (特救・解散命令, Tokkyū: Kaisan Meirei): written by Noboru Sugimura, directed by Takeshi Ogasawara
52. Special Rescue: Explosion Order (特救・爆破命令, Tokkyū: Bakuha Meirei): written by Noboru Sugimura, directed by Michio Konishi
53. Until We Meet Again (また逢う日まで, Mata Au Hi made): written by Noboru Sugimura, directed by Michio Konishi

== Cast ==
- Daiki Nishio (西尾 大樹, Nishio Daiki): Kōichi Nakayama (中山幸一, Nakayama Kōichi)
- Reiko Higuchi (樋口 玲子, Higuchi Reiko): Mitsue Mori (森 みつえ, Mori Mitsue)
  - Reiko Higuchi (child; 11): Miho Tamura
- Shunsuke Masaki (正木 俊介, Masaki Shunsuke): Hiroshi Miyauchi (宮内 洋, Hiroshi Miyauchi)
- Jun Masuda (増田 純, Masuda Jun): Hidenori Iura (井浦 秀智, Iura Hidenori)
- Kamekichi Togawa (戸川 亀吉, Togawa Kamekichi): Mitsuru Onodera (小野寺 充, Onodera Mitsuru)
- Ryōma Kagawa (香川 竜馬, Kagawa Ryōma): Masaru Yamashita (山下 優, Yamashita Masaru)
- Takeshi Yazawa (矢沢 武, Yazawa Takeshi): Kaname Kawai (河合 要, Kawai Kaname)
- Midori Aikawa (相川 みどり, Midori Aikawa): Mayuko Irie (入江 まゆこ, Mayuko Irie)
- Norio Tsuruoka (鶴岡 則夫, Tsuruoka Norio): Mitsutaka Tachikawa (立川 三貴, Tachikawa Mitsutaka)
- Hiroshi Tsuruoka (鶴岡 浩, Tsuruoka Hiroshi): Kunihiro Tomita (富田 晋寛, Tomita Kunihiro)
- S.S-I Crew (S.S.-I乗組員, S. S. - I norikumiin): Koji Matoba, Takeshi Ishida, Tokio Iwata, Emiko Takahashi, and Kimiko Imai
- Ryūichi Takaoka (高岡 隆一, Takaoka Ryūichi): Masaki Terasoma (寺杣 昌紀, Terasoma Masaki)

=== Voice cast ===
- SolDozer (ソルドーザー, Sorudōzā): Seizō Katō (加藤 精三, Katō Seizō)
- Cross 8000 (クロス8000, Kurosu hassen): Masaki Terasoma
- Narrator (ナレーター, Narētā): Takeshi Kuwabara (桑原 たけし, Kuwabara Takeshi)

=== Guest cast ===
- Dr.Inagaki (1): Shinya Ono
- Kazuo Inagaki (1): Hirofumi Taga
- Simulated Brain A320 (voice; 1): Yoshio Kawai
- Ryuzo Makimura (2): Katsuhiko Kobayashi
- Emi Makimura (2): Miki Takahashi
- Rumi Makimura (2): Masami Hosoi
- Yuka Mizusawa (2): Yoko Honna
- Dr. Shibuzawa (3): Toshimichi Takahashi
- Hatta (3): Koji Takahashi
- Jun Tashiro (3): Shiro Saito
- Kenta Tashiro (3): Mitsunari Hashimoto
- Yukio Sano (4): Ryosuke Kaizu
- Sano's minion (4): Kazuhiko Shimizu
- Aoyama Electric Officer (4): Daisaku Shinohara
- Aoyama Electric Researcher (4): Koji Imai
- Game Machime Monster (4 - voices): Toku Nishio, Kaoru Shinoda
- Koichi Ishikawa/Phanton Bond (5): Ritsuo Ishiyama
- Yasuhiko Kujo (5): Maroshi Tamura
- Naoto Yamaguchi (5): Shogo Kudo
- Naoto's mother (5): Noriko Ikeda
- Yumi Saiga (5): Mayumi Yoshida
- Shinichiro Ishimaru/Kinta Kinentei (6): Kintoli Sanyutei
- Shigeko Ishimaru (6): Sayoko Tanimoto
- Kumagai Family (6)
  - Hanji Kumagai: Yutaka Oyama
  - Teruichi Kumagai: Yuji Okada
  - Tokuko Kumagai: Sayako Satake
- Jingoro Makino (7): Tadayoshi Ueda
- Masaru Makino (7): Kenzo Miyake
- Kasai (7): Hironobu Kasahara
- Saeki (7): Yuji Terada
- Katsuhiko Sakamoto/Proto Solbraver (8): Junichi Haruta
- Mamoru Okayama (8): Hiroshi Fuji

=== Suit cast ===
- SolBraver: Kazutoshi Yokoyama and Tokio Iwata
- SolJeanne: Emiko Takahashi
- SolDozer: Toshiyuki Kikuchi
- Knight Fire: Hiroshi Maeda, Jiro Okamoto, and Tokio Iwata

== Crew ==
- Original story by Saburo Yatsude
- Screenplay by: Noboru Sugimura, Nobuo Ōgizawa, Takahiko Masuda, Junichi Miyashita, Susumu Takaku, Takashi Yamada, Kyōko Sagiyama, Mayumi Ishiyama, Akiko Asatsuke
- Music: Kaoru Mizuki
- Photography: Susumu Seo, Takakazu Koizumi
- Assistant Director: Hidenori Ishida, Masashi Taniguchi
- Action Directors: Junji Yamaoka, Jun Murakami
- Special-Effects Director: Nobuo Yajima
- Produced by: Kyōzō Utsunomiya, Atsushi Kaji (TV Asahi), Nagafumi Hori (Toei)
- Directed by: Masao Minowa, Michio Konishi, Takeshi Ogasawara, Kaneharu Mitsumura, Kiyoshi Arai, Hidenori Ishida
- Production: TV Asahi, ASATSU, Toei

== Songs ==
Opening theme

- "Tokkyū Shirei Solbrain" (特救指令ソルブレイン, Tokkyū Shirei Soruburein)
  - Lyrics: Akira Otsu (大津 あきら, Ōtsu Akira)
  - Composition: Kisaburō Suzuki (鈴木 キサブロー, Suzuki Kisaburō)
  - Arrangement: Tatsumi Yano (矢野 立美, Yano Tatsumi)
  - Artist: Takayuki Miyauchi (宮内 タカユキ, Miyauchi Takayuki)
  - Chorus: Morinoki Children Choir (森の木児童合唱団, Morinoki Jidō Gasshōdan)

Closing theme

- "Ai ni Dakarete" (愛に抱かれて; "Embracing in Love")
  - Lyrics: Akira Ōtsu
  - Composition: Kisaburō Suzuki
  - Arrangement: Tatsumi Yano
  - Artist: Takayuki Miyauchi
  - Chorus: Morinoki Jidō Gasshōdan

== Video game ==
A video game for Tokkyū Shirei Solbrain was released in 1991 for the Famicom, published by Angel and developed by Natsume Co., Ltd. It was localized into Shatterhand, which was published by Jaleco for the Nintendo Entertainment System in North America and Europe shortly after the Japanese release. The differences are mainly cosmetic (changing music and graphics) but there were also several substantial changes, such as which boss appeared in which area. In addition, the theme-park stage from the Famicom version was replaced with a nuclear-submarine stage in the NES version.

== Philippine English voice cast ==
All 53 episodes were covered and were visually aired uncut. However, some of the characters had their first names changed to be more anglicized, while their surnames were kept. However, several characters have kept their Japanese full names completely intact. For example, Daiki Nishio, Reiko Higuchi and Jun Masuda were renamed to Corey Nishio, Rachel Higuchi and John Masuda respectively.

- Daiki Nishino/Corey Nishio/SolBraver - Earl Palma
- Reiko Higuchi/Rachel Higuchi/SolJeanne - Unknown
- Jun Masuda/John Masuda - Earl Palma
- Shunsuke Masaki - Earl Palma

== International broadcasts and home video ==
- The series aired in Indonesia on Indosiar with an Indonesian dub in the mid-1990s produced by Erfas Studio. It also aired again in 2001.
- It also aired in Thailand on Channel 3 with a Thai dub.
- In Brazil, the series aired as Super Equipe de Resgate Solbrain on the now-defunct Rede Manchete in 1995 with a Brazilian Portuguese dub. This was the final Metal Heroes series to be released in the region with a dub.
- The series received a Latin Spanish dub dubbed in Mexico with its dub produced by Comarex dubbed by Larsa Studios, recorded and released in 1996. It aired as Super Rescate Solbrain.
- This series aired in the Philippines with all 53 episodes dubbed into English by Telesuccess Productions, Toei's Filipino branch. This is the first and only entry in the Metal Hero series to ever receive an English dub. It first began airing on IBC 13 in 1997 with all 53 episodes dubbed in English and later Tagalog (Filipino), both versions being fully uncut. However, most characters in the English dub had their first names changed, but several characters had their names either slightly modified or fully kept intact. It also aired again on ABC 5 (now TV5) in 1999. The English dub was also released on DVD in 2004 and is reported to be the only Metal Heroes series to ever be released with an English dub. Later on, the series was bought back on the air in 2006 on GMA Network with a newly produced Tagalog dub of the series.
