= Keiko Hanagata =

Japanese voice actress

Keiko Hanagata (花形 恵子, Hanagata Keiko; June 2, 1935 - January 12, 2015) was a Japanese voice actress who worked for 81 Produce. She was born in Tokyo, Japan.

== Filmography ==
- Glass Mask (TV 2005) (Art director (ep.5))
- Maison Ikkoku (Principal of Wakaba nursery school (ep.93))
- Robot Carnival (movie) (Grandma (presence))
