= Future Force =

Future Force may refer to:

- Future Force (film), a 1989 film starring David Carradine
- Future Force Warrior, a concept for an advanced United States soldier
- Future Force, a 41st-century superhero team led by Rai.
