= The Mobile Cop Jiban =

- Jiban DVD cover in Japan
- Genre: Tokusatsu; Superhero fiction Science fiction Police drama Biopunk; Cyberpunk
- Created by: Saburō Yatsude
- Developed by: Noboru Sugimura
- Directed by: Michio Konishi
- Starring: Shouhei Kusaka; Konomi Mashita; Michiko Enokida; Hajime Izu; Leo Meneghetti
- Voices of: Shōzō Iizuka
- Narrated by: Tōru Ōhira
- Composer: Michiaki Watanabe
- Country of origin: Japan
- No. of episodes: 52

Production
- Running time: 25 minutes
- Production companies: Toei Company; Asatsu-DK

Original release
- Network: TV Asahi (ANN)
- Release: January 29, 1989 – January 28, 1990

Related
- Sekai Ninja Sen Jiraiya; Special Rescue Police Winspector

TV series logo.

TV series international logo.

The Mobile Cop Jiban (機動刑事ジバン, Kidō Keiji Jiban) is a Japanese tokusatsu television series which serves as the 8th entry in the Metal Hero Series franchise and the first entry in the Heisei period. Produced by Toei and aired by TV Asahi in Japan from January 29, 1989, to January 28, 1990, it ran for 52 episodes and a feature movie released on July 15, 1989. According to Toei's International Sales & Promotion Department, the series' international English title is referred to as just simply Jiban. This series is a tribute to the 25th anniversary of the 8-Man manga and anime series.

== Plot ==
"This is the drama of a girl's and a young man's hearts which love people and protect justice." (これは人を愛し、正義を守る若者と少女の心のドラマである。, Kore wa Hito o Aishi, Seigi o Mamoru Wakamono to Shōjo no Kokoro no Dorama de aru.)

Naoto Tamura, a new detective in Central City, is killed by a Bionoid Monster in the line of duty. Doctor Kenzo Igarashi, a man whose experiments had been responsible for the Bioron syndicate's existence, brought the man back to life as Jiban, a cybernetic police detective equipped to take on the syndicate. Eventually, Madogarbo and Rhinonoid killed Jiban, who returned to life again as Perfect Jiban (basically the same design as the original, but with a blue-colored metal body and three new weapons). In the finale, Biolon destroyed Jiban's base and transformed Madogarbo into a doppelganger of Jiban himself. Jiban defeated his duplicate and ultimately Gibanoid, the true form of Biolon's leader Doctor Giba. The victorious Jiban then learned that Mayumi Igarashi, the one civilian that knew his secret, had been his missing younger sister all along.

== Characters ==
Mobile Cop Jiban, holding up his badge.

- Naoto Tamura/Mobile Cop Jiban
  A human revived as a cyborg by Doctor Igarashi to fight Biolon. He is capable of reverting to his human identity at will. He holds the rank of deputy police commissioner (as a robot) and detective (as human). Jiban's programming enables him to follow these directives:
1. Arrest criminals in any circumstance without a warrant.
2. Punish criminals on his own judgment if they happen to be members of Bioron.
3. Use lethal force depending on the circumstances.

In human form, Naoto often plays the fool and is looked on down by Youko and Kiyoshiro for this, but Youko begins to warm up to him after realizing he could be Jiban.

- Mayumi Igarashi
  The only civilian who knew Jiban's secret identity. She later lost her memory in battle, after falling from a waterfall. Eventually, Madogarbo gave her a special "Bomb Ring"; if Naoto approached her as Jiban, the ring will go off. She called Naoto her 'big brother,' only to find that she was really his lost sister in the finale.
- Shun'ichi and Shizue Igarashi
  Mayumi's (adoptive) parents. Shunichi is the son of Doctor Kenzou Igarashi but is not a scientist. Relocated as witnesses to Biolon, they resumed their life as Mayumi's foster parents in the finale.
- Doctor Kenzo Igarashi
  Started the Jiban project to counter Bioron, the results of his biological experimentation and he designed Jiban's high mobility system weapon Daedalus. He passed away after Jiban was completed.
- Youko Katagiri
  A female detective of Central City. Naoto's senior. Manly sharpshooter who could not figure out that Naoto was Jiban. She is also known in the Filipino Dubbed Version as Loren.
- Kiyoshiro Muramatsu
  Elite detective of Central City with a liking for Youko.
- Seiichi Yanagida
  The head of the Police Department. He cooperated with Doctor Igarashi in the Jiban Project two years earlier. He collaborated with Jiban after Igarashi's death. He was killed when Jiban's base was destroyed.
- Section Chief Takeko Bando
  The Central City Section Chief of Detectives. Got headaches trying to keep the peace in jurisdictions where strange events occurred, no thanks to Biolon.
- Michiyo Matsumoto
  A tea server of the Detectives' Section of Central City Police Department. She is always cheerful and encouraging.
- Boy/Harry Boy
  Jiban's robotic assistant. He stays at his secret base. Originally he was simply Boy, an immobile camera-like robot who had to give instructions to Mayumi to operate the control center, but then his computer was transferred to the panda-like "Harry" (a robot devised by another student of Doctor Igarashi's) and began substituting for the amnesiac Mayumi. When Jiban's base was destroyed, he was destroyed along with it.
- Ryo Hayakawa
  A drifter who takes in Mayumi after she loses her memory, mistaking her for his dead sister, Midori. He initially refers to her by that name but later refers to her by her own name after reading a missing person's notice, although Mayumi does not tell him her true origins (since her memory is faulty). In the scuffle, Mayumi goes away, unable to remember what just happened. He died in Episode 46, when Jiban removed the Bomb Ring from Mayumi's finger with a very precise shot without hurting her. Ryou took the ring and ran to throw it out, but was killed in the resulting explosion. He is played by Ryouhei Kobayashi Who would later play Fumiya Hoshikawa / Five Black in the 1990 sentai series Chikyu Sentai Fiveman.

=== Equipment ===
- Jiban's Badge
  It can be used as a communicator to contact Boy, Seiichi, and Mayumi in Jiban's Base or used to summon any of his vehicles, as well as to control their armaments electronically.

==== Articles ====
Every episode, when Jiban faces his Bionoid enemy, he ejects his badge from his waist and shows it to the monster, reading a code of articles and laws that serve as his directives (much like RoboCop's prime directives), but unlike the movie, they giving him a greater freedom instead of restricting him:

- (1st Article)
  Mobile Cop Jiban, under any circumstances, can arrest the criminal without a warrant. (（第一条）機動刑事ジバンは、いかなる場合でも令状なしに犯人を逮捕することができる。, (Daiichijō) Kidō Keiji Jiban wa, ikanaru baai demo reijō nashi ni hannin o taiho suru koto ga dekiru.)
- (2nd Article)
  Mobile Cop Jiban, in case the enemy is recognized as Biolon, can apply the punishment by his own judgement. (（第二条）機動刑事ジバンは、相手がバイオロンと認めた場合、自らの判断で犯人を処罰することができる。, (Dainijō) Kidō Keiji Jiban wa, aite ga Baioron to mitometa baai, mizukara no handan de hannin o shobatsu suru koto ga dekiru.)
  - (Attachment)
    Depending on the circumstances, even erasing him is allowed. (（補足）場合によっては抹殺することも許される。, (Hosoku) Baai ni yotte wa massatsu suru koto mo yurusareru.)
- (3rd Article)
  Mobile Cop Jiban's maximum priority is human life, and every given order that disregards this can be rejected. (（第三条）機動刑事ジバンは、人間の生命を最優先とし、これを顧みないあらゆる命令を排除することができる。, (Daisanjō) Kidō Keiji Jiban wa, ningen no seimei o saiyūsen toshi, kore o kaeriminai arayuru meirei o haijo suru koto ga dekiru.)
- (5th Article)
  In the case of Biolon manipulating the humans' heart, the punishment can be applied by his own judgement. (（第五条）人間の信じる心を利用し、悪のために操るバイオロンと認めた場合、自らの判断で処罰する事ができる。, (Daigojō) Ningen no shinjiru kokoro o riyō shi, aku no tame ni ayatsuru Baioron to mitometa baai, mizukara no handan de shobatsu suru koto ga dekiru.)
- (6th Article)
  The crime of disposing of children's dreams, and hurting their heart is especially severe. (（第六条）子どもの夢を奪い、その心を傷つけた罪は特に重い。, (Dairokujō) Kodomo no yume o ubai, sono kokoro o kizutsuketa tsumi wa toku ni omoi.)
- (9th Article)
  Mobile Cop Jiban can erase everyone that destroys all lifeforms' peace by his own judgment. (（第九条）機動刑事ジバンは、あらゆる生命体の平和を破壊する者を、自らの判断で抹殺することができる。, (Daikyūjō) Kidō Keiji Jiban wa, arayuru seimeitai no heiwa o hakai suru mono o, mizukara no handan de massatsu suru koto ga dekiru.)

==== Super Police Vehicles ====
- Super Police Machine Reson
  Jiban's patrol car, a modified Pontiac Firebird with a sixth generation computer and hence a will of its own. It was destroyed by Gibanoid in the finale.
- Super Police Bike Vaican
  Jiban's Suzuki motorcycle with a sixth generation computer and hence a will of its own. It was destroyed by Gibanoid in the finale. It is known as Mecha Panther in the Philippine version and Bikan in the English version.
- Super Police Jet Spylas
  Jiban's stealth fighter plane with a will of its own, and it was destroyed by Doctor Giba using his ship's weapon systems.

==== Weapons ====
- Spikes
  It is hidden in Jiban's upper arms to puncture and break a hold or to shoot.
- Jiban Hyper Beam
  It is hidden in Jiban's upper arms to shoot into areas that cannot be accessed through physical means (example: doors). Jiban used it in the movie.
- Maximillian Type 3
  Jiban's personal jutte-like weapon. Concealed in a collapsible holster located on his right leg, it can transform into either Pistol, Stun Gun, or Sword Mode.

The Maximillian Type 3 can also perform the following moves and techniques:

1. Disclose Shock
  It is used in stun gun mode, essentially a stun gun.
2. Last Shooting/ThermalBeam/Search Buster
  It is used in pistol mode, firing laser shots.
3. Jiban End (Energy sword)
  It is used in sword mode, splits enemies in half. It is known as Jiban Slash in the Filipino version and either JIBAN FLYING CRASH or JIBAN HAKEN CRASH in the English version.
- Daedalus
  Jiban's personal cannon. Required to perform the Daedalus Bombard Technique, which is used to finish off foes. It can be made into a jetpack to enable Jiban to fly short distances.
- Autoderringer
  Jiban's personal rifle. He acquired it after being resurrected as Perfect Jiban. It has a machine gun mode and a bazooka mode. The machine gun mode is used to stun and set up the enemy; after an "Energy Charge" in which the bazooka is charged, it fires a powerful shot to finish off the enemy. It was destroyed by Gibanoid during Jiban's final fight with him.
- Powerbreaker
  Pincer/claw. A left arm attachment. It can be used to attack enemies. He acquired it after being resurrected as Perfect Jiban.
- Needricker
  Drill. A right arm attachment. It can be used to drill into areas that cannot be accessed through physical means (e.g. doors). He acquired it after being resurrected as Perfect Jiban.

=== Criminal Syndicate Bioron ===
An armed force organized by the mysterious scientist Doctor Giba intending to take over the Earth by means of narrow attacks rather than large-scale destruction. Their theme/weapon is biochemistry.

- Doctor Giba
  The bearded brown-haired Caucasian human-looking leader and founder of Bioron. His real identity is Gibanoid, a bio-monster born by accident from the chemical waste of Doctor Igarashi's National Science Academy Bio Laboratory. As a result, Giba is filled with malice for humans. He assumed his true form in the series finale, using Mayumi as a shield to escape in his ship. He died while fighting Jiban on his ship as it crashed into a mountainside.
- Marsha and Karsha
  The first bio-lifeforms created by Kiba, his secretaries and intermediaries between him and his Bionoid agents. They can transform into small spiders (for spying on people), and assume their inhuman "Battle" forms (Battle Marsha and Battle Karsha), armed with energy whips. They were killed in the series finale by Doctor Giba for failing to kill Jiban.
- Bubi and Muku (Pugui and Muguie in the Brazilian dub)
  The cute and not so-cute creatures living in Bioron's base. Muku was one of Jiban's foes in early chapters, in giant size, but only as a distraction. The 4 critters had a tendency to annoy Marsha and Karsha with their Commentary of what the 2 recently did during that episode. Sometimes just showing up once to be used as target practice by the Bionoids demonstrating their powers. The four became friends with Mayumi when she told them about a mother's love and she tried to defend them from Marsha and Karsha who attacked the critters for saving Mayumi's life by defusing the bomb in Fake Momnoid. They hung out with Mayumi in the finale.
- Madogarbo
  A Jiban Cyborg Killer created by Doctor Giba as a counter to Jiban. Using power from Queen Cosmos, she and Rhinonoid are able to kill Jiban in Episode 34, but he is resurrected as Perfect Jiban. She later assumes his total appearance to attack him by having his Reson, Spylas and Vaican attack Jiban making them believe Jiban was Madogarbo. She even got as far as damaging Jiban so badly that he went blind, but Mayumi's Despair at seeing her brother about to be killed caused what was left of Queen Cosmos's energy to gather and blast Fake Jiban, turning her back into regular Madogarbo. She was then killed by Jiban.
- Kuro Kiba
  Mad Garbo's motorcycle with rhino horn and sidecar with machine guns. In the English version, it is known as Black Fang.
- Queen Cosmos
  A lunar life form resembling a human woman (but actually a floating rock like starfish with a long tail) intent on conquering Earth to establish an all-woman empire. She appeared in episode 28 but did not reveal her name till episode 34. In her own words, she is made of space garbage and came from a place that was cold and ugly, lacking anything beautiful, thus her obsession with having everything beautiful and being called beautiful herself. She is more powerful than the other Biorons (except Doctor Giba himself); she allies with them to destroy Jiban. Her jewelry turns into parasite creatures: Earring into a skull patterned ladybug that would infuse into Jiban distorting his circuitry and her Brooch would turn into a spider creature blasting Jiban with tiny powerful balls of light. Her bracelet was able to transform into a snake creature wrapping around one's neck to control their mind. In Episode 46, she was defeated by Jiban.
- Golem Cosmos
  An offshoot of Queen Cosmos herself, this entity was created to be her champion from a piece of herself. The creature was extremely powerful, armed with a crescent sword and shield, she very nearly defeated Jiban until he grabbed her sword wrist with Powerbreaker, twisting her wrist and impaling her with Needricker. She then turned back into her clay statue state and dissolved. Weapons: A long silvery sword, shield, energy blasts from sword and laser blasts from eyes.
- Masques
  The mass-produced grunt human-like life forms armed with knives, guns, machine guns, and bazookas. They can disguise themselves as humans and regenerate lost limbs. A determined human (usually Yoko and sometimes Kiyoshiro) can take them out by shooting them in the head or chest or by physically choking them out.

==== Bionoid ====
Bionoids are the product of Doctor Giba's research. They can disguise themselves as humans.

- Chamelenoid
- Catnoid
- Mudnoid
- Rosenoid
- Octopusnoid
- Vulturenoid
- Influenzanoid: In the English version, it is known as Coldnoid.
- Molenoid
- Hyenanoid
- Nightmarenoid
- Hedgehognoid
- Skunknoid
- Killernoid
- Wolfnoid
- Jellyfishnoid
- Agehanoid
- Starfishnoid
- Injectnoid
- Moneynoid
- Bugnoid
- Hunternoid
- Goatnoid
- Suicidenoid
- Explodenoid
- Dragonnoid
- Centipedenoid
- Elephanoid
- Doublenoid
- Kabukinoid
- Shinobinoid
- Distnoid
- Electric Fishnoid: In the English version, it is known as Snakeheadnoid.
- Rhinonoid
- Chambaranoid: In the English version, it is known as Swordfightnoid.
- Tortoinoid
- Mushroonoid
- HermitCrabnoid
- Panthernoid
- Anacondanoid: In the English version, it is known as Drunknoid.
- Tyrannosaurusnoid
- Catfishnoid
- Cobranoid
- Suitorunoid: In the English version, it is known as Absorbnoid.
- Squidnoid
- Unicornnoid
- TempleBellnoid
- Fakemomnoid
- Great Gibanoid
- Batblock
- Ammoblock
- Spiderblock

== Episodes ==
1. My Lovely Girl Boss (僕のかわゆい少女ボス, Boku no Kawayui Shōjo Bosu): written by Noboru Sugimura, directed by Michio Konishi
2. I Love! Naoto Older Brother (大好き! ナオトお兄ちゃん, Dai Suki! Naoto Oni-chan): written by Noboru Sugimura, directed by Michio Konishi
3. The Strange Man and the Haunted Vegetables (へんな男とおばけ野菜, Hen na Otoko to Obake Yasai): written by Noboru Sugimura, directed by Akihisa Okamoto
4. Truly Beautiful Rose's Present (すてきなバラのプレゼント, Suteki na Bara no Purezento): written by Kunio Fujii, directed by Akihisa Okamoto
5. Three Great Mecha Mobilize! Rescue the Idol Robo! (三大メカ出動! アイドルロボを救出せよ!, Sandaimeka Shutsudō! Aidoru Robo o Kyūshutsu seyo!): written by Noboru Sugimura, directed by Kiyohiko Miyasaka
6. The Secret of the Broken Dinosaur Egg (割れた恐竜の卵のひみつ, Wareta Kyōryū no Tamago no Himitsu): written by Susumu Takaku, directed by Kiyohiko Miyasaka
7. Dreadful Sneezing Man! (恐怖のハクションおじさん!, Kyōfu no Hakushon Oji-san!): written by Kunio Fujii, directed by Michio Konishi
8. Dekoboko! Tokyo Mole Map (デコボコ! 東京モグラ地図, Dekoboko! Tōkyō Mogura Chizu): written by Nobuo Ogizawa, directed by Michio Konishi
9. The Puppy Became a Cat (猫になった子犬, Neko ni Natta Koinu): written by Susumu Takaku, directed by Kaneharu Mitsumura
10. Papa Isn't Papa!? (パパはパパじゃない!?, Papa wa Papa Janai!?): written by Kunio Fujii, directed by Kaneharu Mitsumura
11. The Girl's and the Warrior's Heart Pledge (少女と戦士の心の誓い, Shōjo to Senshi no Kokoro no Chikai): written by Noboru Sugimura, directed by Akihisa Okamoto
12. Danger! Youko Senpai (危うし! 洋子先輩, Ayaushi! Yōuko Senpai): written by Susumu Takaku, directed by Akihisa Okamoto
13. Help the Sorrowful Boy (哀しみの少年を救え, Kanashimi no Shōnen o Sukue): written by Noboru Sugimura, directed by Michio Konishi
14. Love's Great Reversal Game! (愛の大逆転ゲーム!, Ai no Daigyakuten Gemu!): written by Kunio Fujii, directed by Michio Konishi
15. The Werewolf Likes Piano (オオカミ男はピアノ好き, Ōkamiotoko wa Piano Suki): written by Nobuo Ogizawa, directed by Akihisa Okamoto
16. I Am a Transparent Person!! (おれは透明人間だぞ!!, Ore wa Tōmei Ningen Da zo!!): written by Susumu Takaku, directed by Akihisa Okamoto
17. Birth! VS Jiban Deadly Weapons (誕生! 対ジバン必殺兵器, Tanjō! Tai Jiban Hissatsu Heiki): written by Noboru Sugimura, directed by Michio Konishi
18. Mother and Daughter・In the Edge of Sadness (母と娘・悲しみの果てに, Haha to Musume・Kanashimi no Hate ni): written by Noboru Sugimura, directed by Michio Konishi
19. Give Up the Electronic Badge! (電子手帳返上!, Denshiteichō Henjō!): written by Noboru Sugimura, directed by Akihisa Okamoto
20. City Money Rained Down! (町にお金が降って来た!, Machi no Okane ga Kudattekita!): written by Noboru Sugimura, directed by Akihisa Okamoto
21. Steel Insect - Poisonous Insect - Guerilla Insect (スズ虫・毒虫・ゲリラ虫, Suzumushi・Dokumushi・Geriramushi): written by Susumu Takaku, directed by Kaneharu Mitsumura
22. It Was Mayumi!! (マユミがいた!!, Mayumi ga Ita!!): written by Susumu Takaku, directed by Kaneharu Mitsumura
23. The Monster Who Overate Manga (マンガを喰いすぎた怪物, Manga o Kuisugita Kaibutsu): written by Nobuo Ogizawa, directed by Akihisa Okamoto
24. Welcome!! To the Great Spiritual World (ようこそ!! 大霊界へ, Yōkoso!! Daireikai e): written by Susumu Takaku, directed by Akihisa Okamoto
25. Strike the Goddess! (女神サマをぶッとばせ!, Megami-sama o Buttobase!): written by Noboru Sugimura, directed by Takeshi Ogasawara
26. Dragon-Fished Beautiful Gourmet (竜に釣られたグルメ美女, Ryū ni Tsurareta Gurume Bijo): written by Nobuo Ogizawa, directed by Takeshi Ogasawara
27. Love Children are Demon Children (愛するわが子は悪魔の子, Aisuru Wagako wa Akumako): written by Noboru Sugimura, directed by Michio Konishi
28. Papa is Doctor Giba?! (パパはドクターギバ?!, Papa wa Dokutā Giba?!): written by Noboru Sugimura, directed by Michio Konishi
29. Mass Loving Encounters! (集団見合いで大ドンデン!, Shūdan Miai de Daidonden!): written by Nobuo Ogizawa, directed by Akihisa Okamoto
30. Handsome Boy Kotaro's Party Monster (美少年小太郎一座の怪人, Bishōnen Kotarō Ichiza no Kaijin): written by Kyoko Sagiyama, directed by Akihisa Okamoto
31. The Midsummer's Night Ninja Battle (真夏の夜のニンジャ合戦, Manatsu no Yoru no Ninja Gassen): written by Susumu Takaku, directed by Kaneharu Mitsumura
32. Pearl's Tears are in the Golden Ocean (パールの涙は金色の海に, Pāru no Namida wa Kiniro no Umi ni): written by Kunio Fujii, directed by Kaneharu Mitsumura
33. Millenium Flower Smiled at the Garbo (ガルボに咲いた千年ハス, Garubo ni Waraita Sennen Hasu): written by Kyoko Sagiyama, directed by Michio Konishi
34. Heroic! Jiban Dies (壮絶! ジバン死す, Sōzetsu! Jiban Shisu): written by Noboru Sugimura, directed by Michio Konishi
35. It's Perfect Jiban! (パーフェクトジバンだ!, Pāfekuto Jiban da!): written by Noboru Sugimura, directed by Akihisa Okamoto
36. Dreaming Sword Fighting Monster! (夢見るチャンバラ怪物!, Yumemiru Chanbara Kaibutsu!): written by Nobuo Ogizawa, directed by Akihisa Okamoto
37. I Am the Most Beautiful Woman in the World!? (私は世界一の美女!?, Watashi wa Sekaiichi no Bijo!?): written by Noboru Sugimura, directed by Michio Konishi
38. It's Birthplace, Mother! (故郷だよ、おっ母さん!, Furusato da yo, Okka-san!): written by Nobuo Ogizawa, directed by Michio Konishi
39. Mayumi's Bomb Ring!! (マユミの指輪爆弾!!, Mayumi no Yubiwa Bakudan!!): written by Noboru Sugimura, directed by Takeshi Ogasawara
40. Great Revolt!! Haunted Clock (大反乱!! お化け時計, Daihanran!! Obake Tokei): written by Susumu Takaku, directed by Takeshi Ogasawara
41. Digression! Unmanageable Policewoman (脱線! じゃじゃ馬婦警, Dassen! Jajauma Fukei): written by Kenichi Araki, directed by Kaneharu Mitsumura
42. Monster Rock'n Roll! (怪物ロックンロール!, Kaibutsu Rokkun Rōru!): written by Nobuo Ogizawa, directed by Kaneharu Mitsumura
43. Youko Pierced Jiban...! (ジバンを刺した洋子...!, Jiban o Sashita Yōuko...!): written by Kunio Fujii, directed by Michio Konishi
44. The Genius Scientist Who Turned into a Kid (子供になった天才科学者, Kodomo ni Natta Tensai Kagakusha): written by Kyoko Sagiyama, directed by Michio Konishi
45. Dreadful Squid-Human Operation! (恐怖の人間スルメ作戦!, Kyōfu no Ningen Surume Sakusen!): written by Kenichi Araki, directed by Akihisa Okamoto
46. I Like! Two Brothers (好き! 二人のお兄ちゃん, Suki! Futari no Oni-chan): written by Noboru Sugimura, directed by Akihisa Okamoto
47. Clash! Christmas Final Battle!! (激突! クリスマス決戦!!, Gekitotsu! Kurisumasu Kessen!!): written by Susumu Takaku, directed by Takeshi Ogasawara
48. Year-Ending Biolon Extermination Party! (年忘れバイオロン退治!, Toshiwasure Baioron Taiji!): written by Nobuo Ogizawa, directed by Takeshi Ogasawara
49. Devastated Jiban Base (あばかれたジバン基地, Abakareta Jiban Kichi): written by Kyoko Sagiyama, directed by Michio Konishi
50. Tie Both Lines and Points (二人を結ぶ点と線, Futari o Musubu Ten to Sen): written by Kenichi Araki, directed by Michio Konishi
51. Slash the Illusion Mayumi! (幻のマユミを斬れ!, Maboroshi no Mayumi o Kire!): written by Noboru Sugimura and Kenichi Araki, directed by Akihisa Okamoto
52. The Final Battle of Love!! (愛の最終決戦!!, Ai no Saishū Kessen!!): written by Noboru Sugimura, directed by Akihisa Okamoto

== Film ==
A movie for the series, entitled The Mobile Cop Jiban: Great Explosion at the Monster Factory of Fear, was released on July 15, 1989 as part of the 1989 "Manga Matsuri" Special Festival.

- Written by Noboru Sugimura
- Directed by Michio Konishi

== Cast ==
- Naoto Tamura
  Hiroshi Tokoro (credited as Shohei Kusaka)
- Doctor Kenzo Igarashi
  Hajime Izu
- Doctor Giba
  Leo Meneghetti
- Mayumi Igarashi/Midori Hayakawa
  Konomi Mashita
- Youko Katagiri
  Michiko Enokida
- Ryo Hayakawa
  Ryohei Kobayashi
- Seiichi Yanagida
  Akira Ishihama
- Marsha
  Ami Kawai
- Karsha
  Akemi Kogawa
- Narrator
  Toru Ohira
- Kiyoshiro Muramatsu
  Kunio Konishi
- Mad Garbo
  Kazuko Yanaga
- Queen Cosmos
  Yoko Asakura

=== Voice cast ===
- Doctor Giba
  Shōzō Iizuka
- Boy
  Kazue Ikura
- Harry→Harry Boy
  Aya Mizoguchi

== Songs ==
Opening theme

- "Kidō Keiji Jiban" (機動刑事ジバン)
  - Lyrics
    Keisuke Yamakawa
  - Composition
    Kisaburō Suzuki
  - Arrangement
    Kazuya Izumi (和泉 一弥, Izumi Kazuya)
  - Artist
    Akira Kushida

Ending theme

- "Ashita Yohō wa Itsumo Hare" (未来(あした)予報はいつも晴れ, "Tomorrow's Forecast is Always Sunny")
  - Lyrics
    Keisuke Yamakawa
  - Composition
    Kisaburō Suzuki
  - Arrangement
    Kazuya Izumi
  - Artist
    Akira Kushida

== Broadcasts and home video ==
- In its home country of Japan, the series originally aired on TV Asahi and other ANN affiliates for 52 episodes starting from January 29, 1989 and concluded on January 28, 1990. Many years later, Toei started releasing the series on DVD from June 21, 2009, to October 21, 2009 throughout five volumes. Each volume is two discs and contains 10 episodes, while volumes 3 and 4 contained 11 episodes each. The series can now be streamed on Toei's YouTube channel called "Toei Tokusatsu Official".
- Brazil was the first country in the world outside of Japan to air the series internationally. It aired with a Brazilian Portuguese dub on the now-extinct Rede Manchete in January 1990 and was aired as Policial de Aço Jiban (Steel Policeman Jiban). In addition, this is the entry within the Metal Hero franchise that arrived the fastest in the country, as the network began broadcasting the first episode while the very last episode was being aired in Japan. The dub was produced by Álamo and licensed by Everest Vídeo do Brasil. For years, despite the series being wildly popular and successful in the region, only the first 50 episodes were included, for cost reasons, the last two episodes were not picked up, leaving the series incomplete for more than two decades. It was not until 2011, when Dubrasil dubbed the final two episodes as the series eventually received a full DVD release with the original Japanese audio and Brazilian Portuguese dub audio on that same year by Focus Filmes with all 52 episodes included and was also made available on Amazon Prime Video in July 2019 by Sato Company as they currently are the license holders of this series for the region, since 2015.
- In France, the series aired as simply Jiban on TF1 on the Club Dorothée block on August 24, 1990, with a French dub produced by Arachnée and originally licensed by AB Groupe. But only the first 26 episodes were aired and dubbed. It also aired on cable in 2001 on Mangas.
- In Spain, the series aired with a Castilian Spanish dub in 1991 on TVE 2 airing as simply Jiban.
- In Latin America, the series aired on various channels starting from 1991 with a Latin Spanish dub produced by Coral Pictures with dubbing work in Venezuela by Lips Studio.
- In Thailand, the series aired with a Thai dub on Channel 9 and later rebranded as MCOT HD.
- In the Philippines, the series aired with a Tagalog dub on IBC-13 from 1992-1996 and GMA-7 from 1998 to 1999, but ran up to 10 out of 52 episodes due to incompletion.
- In Indonesia, it aired on Indosiar with an Indonesian dub in 1996. It also aired on TV 7 (now Tran7).
- In North America, Discotek Media got the rights to release the series on Blu-Ray SD Format, containing all 52 episodes in the original Japanese audio with English subtitles on July 30, 2024.
