= Special Rescue Police Winspector =

- Genre: Tokusatsu; Superhero fiction Mystery fiction Science fiction
- Created by: Saburō Yatsude
- Developed by: Noboru Sugimura
- Directed by: Shōhei Tōjō
- Starring: Masaru Yamashita; Hiroshi Miyauchi; Mami Nakanishi
- Voices of: Kaoru Shinoda; Seiichi Hirai
- Narrated by: Issei Masamune
- Composer: Seiji Yokoyama
- Country of origin: Japan
- No. of episodes: 49

Production
- Producers: Kyōzō Utsunomiya (TV Asahi); Nagafumi Hori (Toei)
- Cinematography: Susumu Seo, Takakazu Koizumi
- Running time: 25 minutes
- Production companies: Toei Company; Asatsu-DK

Original release
- Network: TV Asahi (ANN)
- Release: February 4, 1990 – January 13, 1991

Related
- The Mobile Cop Jiban; Super Rescue Solbrain

Special Rescue Police Winspector (特警ウインスペクター, Tokkei Uinsupekutā) is a Japanese tokusatsu TV series, part of the Metal Hero Series franchise and the first piece of the Rescue Police Series trilogy. The series follows the adventures and missions of a special "Rescue Police" team known as Winspector, as they stop crimes and respond to dangerous events where regular police force is not sufficient. The team is made up of one human (a hero clad in armor) and two robotic assistants.

The opening catchphrase of the series is "Special Rescue Police Winspector: with a love of peace and faith in friendship, they face down crime to protect the lives of innocent people, this is the "Metropolitan Police Special Emergency Unit"!" (特警ウインスペクターとは、平和を愛し、友情を信じ、人の命を守るため犯罪に立ち向かう、「警視庁特別救急警察隊」のことである!, Tokkei Uinsupekutā to wa, Heiwa o Ai shi, Yūjō o Shinji, Hito no Inochi o Mamorutame Hanzai ni Tachimukau, "Keishichō Tokubetsu Kyūkyū Keisatsu Tai" no koto de aru!).

== Story ==
Special Rescue Police Winspector takes place in a near-future Japan of the year 1999. As the country is facing a great threat from criminals, new methods of protecting people are created. The Winspector squad, consisting of the robot brothers Bikel and Walter, along with Ryoma Kagawa (wearing the Fire Tector armor), defend against super powered threats, ranging from mob attacks to scientific experiments gone terribly wrong.

== Team ==
- Ryoma Kagawa/Fire (香川 竜馬/ファイヤー, Kagawa Ryōma/Faiyā): (Gabriel in Tagalog Dub) 23 years old. Ryoma is the leader of the team and the only human member. Like Masaki, he is also a Police Superintendent. Kagawa is an orphan skilled in martial arts and knows five languages. His primary means of transportation is a purpose-built car named Winsquad. When initiating his transformation to Fire he calls out "Suit up!" (着化!, Chakka!). He is then equipped with an energy sword - his primary all-purpose weapon - and a suit of red armor called the Crush Tector (クラステクター, Kurasu Tekutā), which enhances his strength and can protect its wearer from poisonous gas, heavy gunfire, and oxygen deprivation, but can only be worn for five minutes at a time due to the stress it puts on his body. There are also other, more specialized weapons and tools available. Ryoma has a sister. He later joined the Solbrain team as Knight Fire (ナイトファイヤー, Naito Faiyā).
- Bikel (バイクル, Baikuru): Walter's "twin brother", Bikel is one of two robots who assist Ryouma. His primary means of transportation is his motorcycle. However, he also has a wheel integrated into his chest section which he can use to "land-surf" when no vehicle is available. His weaponry consists of twin lances, which can be combined into a longer staff and can alternatively function as the handles of his motorcycle or coin bombs. Bikel's armor is yellow. Being a master of jokes and sometimes a little inane, he's often subject to Walter's anger. He speaks in a Nagoya dialect.
- Walter (ウォルター, Worutā): Bikel's "twin brother", Walter is the other of the two robots in the team. Being equipped with a pair of wings that enable him to fly, he requires no special vehicle. His armor is turquoise. Walter loves children and he is generally the type of "person" who enjoys life.
- Shunsuke Masaki (正木 俊介, Masaki Shunsuke): Shunsuke is Winspector's commander and founder. He usually remains in the headquarters of Winspector, but if necessary, for example when a member falls into a pinch, he goes to the site himself and takes command. After the series, he established another rescue team called Solbrain and made a comeback in the last few episodes of Exceedraft.
- Junko Fujino (藤野 純子, Fujino Junko): (Carina in Tagalog dub) Junko is an information G-man. She is an expert with handguns.
- Hisako Koyama (小山 久子, Koyama Hisako): Hisako is a secret G-man. She usually works in a coffee shop. Her father, Masanobu Koyama (小山 正信, Koyama Masanobu), was a colleague of Masaki until he was killed in action six years ago.
- Shin'ichi Nonoyama (野々山 真一, Nonoyama Shin'ichi): Shin'ichi is Winspector's mechanic. He develops rescue tools and maintains Bikel and Walter. Likes playing chess
- Madocks (マドックス, Madokkusu): Madocks is Winspector's supercomputer. Madocks holds data on every criminal and can analyze it in an instant.
- Demitasse (デミタス, Demitasu): Demitasse is a small robot. His main work is to repair Bichael and Walter during emergencies, as well as secret investigation activity.

== Arsenal ==
- GigaStreamer (ギガストリーマー, Gigasutorīmā): The team's strongest weapon, first used in episode 31 to defeat a robot cop named Brian, who was created by the same system as Bichael and Walter, but was reprogrammed to be a killing machine. GigaStreamer has two modes depending on which of two tops (drill or plasma minigun) is put onto it. Its strongest attack is a plasma minigun blast called Maxime Mode which needs Fire to insert his MaxCalibur to the gun. Later Daiki (SolBraver) used it to defeat a chameleon-robot.
- MaxCalibur (マックスキャリバー, Makkusukyaribā): A sword-like gauntlet weapon belonging to Fire, it also shoots lasers.
- BiSpear (バイスピアー, Baisupiā): Bikel's two sticks, which can be combined to form a long rod and are used as the handlebars of WinChaser.
- Dislider (ディスライダー, Disuraidā): Walter's wings, which can transform into a shield. They let him fly, sometimes while carrying Bichael.
- Multi Pack (マルチパック, Maruchipakku): A box with water-shooters and first aid equipment. Used by Fire, Bichael and Walter.
- Daytric M2 (デイトリックM2, Deitorikku Emu Tsū): a laser handgun which can double as a welder. Every member of the team has one and stores it in a holster on the right leg.
- HandWapper (ハンドワッパー, Handowappā): Cuffs.
- WinBadge/FireBadge (特警手帳, Tokkei Techō): Ryoma's police license. Becomes white, when he wears the Crush Tector.
- WinChaser (ウインチェイサー, Uincheisā): A Suzuki TS200 and Bikel's bike, who received it in episode 13.
- WinSquad (ウインスコード, Uinsukōdo): Ryoma's car and transformation device. It's a version of a Chevrolet Camaro colored white. Since ep. 13 when Ryoma puts the blue-colored SPCard (SPカード, Esu Pī Kādo), the WinSquad transforms to a red FireSquad (ファイヤースコード, Faiyāsukōdo).
- Masaki's undercover car: Chief Masaki's car in undercover operations. A White (brown in some episodes) Mazda Luce HC.
- Junko's undercover car: Junko's car in undercover operations. A red Mazda RX-7 FC, similar to KnightFire's Knight Custom in the sequel series Tokkyuu Shirei Solbrain.

== Episodes ==
1. The Runaway Baby (赤ちゃん暴走, Akachan Bōsō): written by Noboru Sugimura, directed by Shohei Tojo
2. Strange R/C (笑うラジコン弾, Warau Rajikon Dan): written by Noboru Sugimura, directed by Shohei Tojo
3. Cheers to Friendship (友情に乾杯, Yūjō ni Kanpai): written by Junichi Miyashita, directed by Takeshi Ogasawara
4. The Life Taking Thief (命を運ぶドロボウ, Inochi o Hakobu Dorobō): written by Junichi Miyashita, directed by Takeshi Ogasawara
5. Attack! The Giant Bird (襲う!巨大怪鳥, Osou! Kyodai Kaichō): written by Susumu Takaku, directed by Kaneharu Mitsumura
6. The Couple That Reverted to Children (子供に戻った両親, Kodomo ni Modotta Ryōshin): written by Nobuo Ogizawa, directed by Kaneharu Mitsumura
7. The Happy, Praying Holy Girl (幸せ祈る聖少女, Shiawase Inoru Seishōjo): written by Kunio Fujii, directed by Shohei Tojo
8. Police Agents in Family (脱線!親子救急隊, Dassen! Oyako Kyūkyūtai): written by Nobuo Ogizawa, directed by Shohei Tojo
9. The Bomb-Setting Dog (爆弾仕掛けの犬, Bakudan Jikake no Inu): written by Susumu Takaku, directed by Michio Konishi
10. Revenge of the Adults (大人をやっつけろ, Otona o Yattsukero): written by Noboru Sugimura, directed by Michio Konishi
11. Ryōta's First Love Letter (良太の初恋急行便, Ryōta no Hatsukoi Kyūkōbin): written by Junichi Miyashita, directed by Takeshi Ogasawara
12. My Robot Friend (僕の友達ロボット, Boku no Tomodachi Robotto): written by Kyoko Sagiyama, directed by Takeshi Ogasawara
13. Ryōma is Dead!? (竜馬が死んだ!?, Ryōma ga Shinda!?): written by Susumu Takaku, directed by Kaneharu Mitsumura
14. The Death-God Moss' Counterattack!! (死神モスの逆襲!!, Shinigami Mosu no Gyakushū!!): written by Susumu Takaku, directed by Kaneharu Mitsumura
15. Ryōma! Destroy Masaki (竜馬!正木を射て, Ryōma! Masaki o Ute): written by Junichi Miyashita, directed by Michio Konishi
16. I Love You, Walter (大好きウォルター, Daisuki Worutā): written by Noboru Sugimura, directed by Michio Konishi
17. The Scary Space Creatures (怖い宇宙の贈り物, Kowai Uchū no Okurimono): written by Noboru Sugimura, directed by Takeshi Ogasawara
18. Super Abilities! The Determined Girl (超能力!孝行少女, Chō Nōryoku! Kōkō Shōjo): written by Kyoko Sagiyama, directed by Takeshi Ogasawara
19. The Bridge of Love and Courage (愛と勇気の父子橋, Ai to Yūki no Oyako Bashi): written by Junichi Miyashita, directed by Kaneharu Mitsumura
20. Burning K.O. Punch! (熱いKOパンチ!, Atsui Kei Ō Panchi!): written by Nobuo Ogizawa, directed by Kaneharu Mitsumura
21. Tears And the Fatal Ball (涙に散った銃弾, Namida ni Chitta Jūdan): written by Takashi Yamada, directed by Michio Konishi
22. The Murderer Who Died Twice (殺人犯は二度死ぬ, Satsujinhan wa Nido Shinu): written by Noboru Sugimura, directed by Michio Konishi
23. Father's Comic Postcard (父のマンガはがき, Chichi no Manga Hagaki): written by Kyoko Sagiyama, directed by Takeshi Ogasawara
24. My Piiko-chan (私のピーコちゃん, Watashi no Pīkochan): written by Susumu Takaku, directed by Takeshi Ogasawara
25. The Robot Which Cries in the Rain (雨に泣くロボット, Ame ni Naku Robotto): written by Nobuo Ogizawa, directed by Kaneharu Mitsumura
26. The Sad Girl's Journey (薄幸少女の旅立ち, Hakkō Shōjo no Tabidachi): written by Takashi Yamada, directed by Kaneharu Mitsumura
27. The Star Summoning 100-Year-Old Beauty (星を呼ぶ百歳美女, Hoshi o Yobu Hyakusai Bijo): written by Kyoko Sagiyama, directed by Michio Konishi
28. Fly! Yūko Rocket (飛べ!優子号, Tobe! Yūko-gō): written by Noboru Sugimura, directed by Michio Konishi
29. The Ghost of the Village (昆虫採集の妖!?怪, Konchū Saishū no Yō!? Kai): written by Susumu Takaku, directed by Takeshi Ogasawara
30. Mama... Mama, Help Me (ママ...ママ助けて, Mama... Mama Tasukete): written by Kenichi Araki, directed by Takeshi Ogasawara
31. The Pain of the Strongest Robo (悲しみの最強ロボ, Kanashimi no Saikyō Robo): written by Noboru Sugimura, directed by Kaneharu Mitsumura
32. Onslaught Against the Police Station (警視庁を占拠せよ, Keishichō o Senkyo Seyo): written by Noboru Sugimura, directed by Kaneharu Mitsumura
33. Urashima Taro Awakens (目覚めた浦島太郎, Mezameta Urashima Tarō): written by Nobuo Ogizawa, directed by Kiyoshi Arai
34. Turnabout Grandma (逆転ばあちゃん, Gyakuten Bāchan): written by Takashi Yamada, directed by Kiyoshi Arai
35. Mother and Child's SOS! (母と子のSOS!, Haha to Ko no Esu Ō Esu!): written by Junichi Miyashita, directed by Takeshi Ogasawara
36. Bichael's Father (バイクルのパパ, Baikuru no Papa): written by Kyoko Sagiyama, directed by Takeshi Ogasawara
37. Attack of the Amazoness (アマゾネス来襲, Amazonesu Raishū): written by Takahiko Masuda, directed by Kaneharu Mitsumura
38. The Chosen Man (選ばれた男, Erabareta Otoko): written by Nobuo Ogizawa, directed by Kaneharu Mitsumura
39. The Sad Old Thief (悲しい老怪盗, Kanashii Rōkaitō): written by Yoshichika Shindo, directed by Kiyoshi Arai
40. The Mutant of the Great Seto Bridge - Part 1 (瀬戸大橋の怪人I, Seto Ōhashi no Kaijin Pāto Wan): written by Noboru Sugimura, directed by Michio Konishi
41. The Mutant of the Great Seto Bridge - Part 2 (瀬戸大橋の怪人II, Seto Ōhashi no Kaijin Pāto Tsū): written by Noboru Sugimura, directed by Michio Konishi
42. The Treasonous Investigator (裏切りの捜査官, Uragiri no Sōsakan): written by Susumu Takaku, directed by Takeshi Ogasawara
43. The Boy Who Became a Bomb (爆弾になった少年, Bakudan ni Natta Shōnen): written by Junichi Miyashita, directed by Takeshi Ogasawara
44. One-Day Only Performance (一日だけの晴れ舞台, Ichinichi Dake no Harebutai): written by Nobuo Ogizawa, directed by Kiyoshi Arai
45. Love Just Before the Explosion at 0 Seconds (爆破0秒前の愛, Bakuha Zerobyō Mae no Ai): written by Takashi Yamada, directed by Kiyoshi Arai
46. One-Day Bad Boy (一日一悪の少年, Ichinichi Ichiaku no Shōnen): written by Nobuo Ogizawa, directed by Michio Konishi
47. The Millionaire Apartment's Trap (億ションの甘い罠, Okushon no Amai Wana): written by Kyoko Sagiyama, directed by Michio Konishi
48. Attack the Special Police! (特警を壊滅せよ!, Tokkei o Kaimetsu Seyo!): written by Noboru Sugimura, directed by Takeshi Ogasawara
49. Fly into the Sky of Hope (翔べ希望の空へ, Tobe Kibō no Sora e): written by Noboru Sugimura, directed by Takeshi Ogasawara

== Cast ==
- Ryoma Kagawa (香川 竜馬, Kagawa Ryōma): Masaru Yamashita (山下 優, Yamashita Masaru)
- Junko Fujino (藤野 純子, Fujino Junko): Mami Nakanishi (中西 真美, Nakanishi Mami)
- Shunsuke Masaki (正木 俊介, Masaki Shunsuke): Hiroshi Miyauchi (宮内 洋, Miyauchi Hiroshi)
- Hisako Koyama (小山 久子, Koyama Hisako): Sachiko Oguri (小栗 さち子, Oguri Sachiko)
- Shin'ichi Nonoyama (野々山 真一, Nonoyama Shin'ichi): Masaru Ōbayashi (大林 勝, Ōbayashi Masaru)
- Toragorō Rokkaku (六角 虎五郎, Rokkaku Toragorō): Shin'ichi Satō (佐藤 信一, Satō Shin'ichi)
- Yūko Kagawa (香川 優子, Kagawa Yūko): Yura Hoshikawa (星川 揺, Hoshikawa Yura)
- Ryōta Koyama (小山 良太, Koyama Ryōta): Ryō Yamamoto (山本 亮, Yamamoto Ryō)

=== Voice cast ===
- Bikel (バイクル, Baikuru): Kaoru Shinoda (篠田 薫, Shinoda Kaoru)
- Walter (ウォルター, Worutā): Seiichi Hirai (平井 誠一, Hirai Seiichi)
- Madocks (マドックス, Madokkusu): Kazuhiko Kishino (岸野 一彦, Kishino Kazuhiko)
- Demitasse (デミタス, Demitasu): Issei Futamata (二又 一成, Futamata Issei)
- Narrator: Issei Masamune (正宗 一成, Masamune Issei)

== Songs ==
Opening theme

- "Tokkei Winspector" (特警ウインスペクター, Tokkei Uinsupekutā)
  - Lyrics: Keisuke Yamakawa (山川 啓介, Yamakawa Keisuke)
  - Composition: Kisaburō Suzuki (鈴木 キサブロー, Suzuki Kisaburō)
  - Arrangement: Tatsumi Yano (矢野 立美, Yano Tatsumi)
  - Artist: Takayuki Miyauchi (宮内 タカユキ, Miyauchi Takayuki)

Ending theme

- "Kyō no Ore kara Ashita no Kimi e" (今日の俺から明日の君へ; "From Today's Me to Tomorrow's You")
  - Lyrics: Keisuke Yamakawa
  - Composition: Kisaburō Suzuki
  - Arrangement: Tatsumi Yano
  - Artist: Takayuki Miyauchi

== International Broadcasts and Home Video ==
- In its home country of Japan, Toei Video released the series on VHS throughout six volumes from April to December 1994. But only 24 episodes total were released. Later, Toei Video released the full TV series for the first time with a DVD release from May 21, 2010 to September 21, 2010. Ten episodes were included in the first four volumes, with the fifth and final volumes containing the last nine.
- In Thailand, the series aired with a Thai dub on MCOT Channel 9 from 1991 to 1992 at 10:30 AM on Sunday mornings and it also aired on TV7 in the mid-1990s. Currently, the series is licensed by TIGA Company in the region.
- In Hong Kong, the series aired with a Cantonese Chinese dub on TVB Jade, broadcast as Future Special Police (未來特警). The first half of the series aired in 1991, with the second half airing in 1993.
- The series in France on TF1 on May 6, 1991. Its popularity led to the airings of subsequent Metal Hero shows such as Space Sheriff Sharivan, Space Sheriff Shaider, and The Mobile Cop Jiban. The opening of the show was sung by Bernard Minet. However, only 42 out of 49 episodes were dubbed in French.
- It was shown in Italy on Italia 7 airing from February 24, 1992 to June 15, 1992. It was the only series in the Metal Heroes series that was aired in the region and it was broadcast fully uncut and unedited in its original form. All 49 episodes were dubbed in Italian. The show used both an instrumental version of the Japanese opening and one of the French dub opening.
- It was also shown in Germany on RTL Television in 1992-1993 (and a second time in 1994-1995). This was the only series in the Metal Heroes series that aired in the region. All 49 episodes were dubbed in German.
- In Spain, the series aired on TVE1 around the same time as Jiban, with a Castilian Spanish dub.
- In Brazil, the series aired with a Brazilian Portuguese dub on TV Manchete in 1994 and it was very popular at the time of its broadcast, along with several other seasons in the Metal Heroes franchise.
- In the Philippines, The series was titled Special Police Rescue Winspector when it debuted and aired on IBC-13 from 1993 to 1994 with a Tagalog dub. In this version, the characters were renamed where Ryoma Kagawa was called Gabriel and Junko Fujino was called Carina and aired as the sequel of The Mobile Cop Jiban.
- In Indonesia, it aired on Indosiar with an Indonesian dub on January 12, 1995. With the channel officially launching a day before the series premiere, that makes this series to be one of the first programs overall to air.
- In Malaysia, it aired on TV3 with a Malay dub in 1995.
- In 2024, Discotek Media announced that they would be releasing all 49 episodes of Winspector on SD-Blu-ray. Making it their sixth consecutive Metal Hero show release following Juspion, Gavan, Sharivan, Jiban, and Shaider.
