= Kyodai Ken Byclosser =

- Genre: Tokusatsu
- Created by: Shotaro Ishinomori
- Developed by: Susumu Takaku
- Directed by: Takeshi Ogasawara
- Starring: Tetsu Kaneko; Yuki Tsuchiya; Keiko Sawachika; Gozo Souma; Kenji Ushio; Midori Takahashi; Keiko Haneda
- Narrated by: Osamu Kobayashi
- Theme music composer: Shunsuke Kikuchi
- Opening theme: "Tatakae! Byclosser" by Gentaro Takahashi
- Ending theme: "Sono Na mo Kyoudai Ken Byclosser" by Gentaro Takahashi
- Composer: Shunsuke Kikuchi
- Country of origin: Japan
- Original language: Japanese
- No. of episodes: 34

Production
- Running time: 30 minutes per episode
- Production companies: Toei Company; Ishimori Productions

Original release
- Network: Nippon Television
- Release: January 10 – August 29, 1985

Kyoudai Ken Byclosser (兄弟拳バイクロッサー, Kyōdai Ken Baikurossā; "Brother Fist Byclosser") is a tokusatsu television series made by Ishinomori Productions and Toei. The series consisted of 34 episodes and was produced with Nippon Television. It aired in Japan from January 10, 1985 until August 29, 1985.

== Media ==
Byclosser was released in Japan by Toei Video through DVDs.

== Songs ==
Opening theme

- "Tatakae! Byclosser" (たたかえ! バイクロッサー, Tatakae! Baikurossā; "Fight! Byclosser")
  - Lyrics: Shotaro Ishinomori (石森 章太郎, Ishinomori Shotaro)
  - Composition: Shunsuke Kikuchi (菊池 俊輔, Kikuchi Shunsuke)
  - Arrangement: Kouji Makaino (馬飼野 康二, Makaino Kouji)
  - Artist: Gentaro Takashi (高橋 元太郎, Takashi Gentaro)

Ending theme

- "Sono na mo Kyoudai Ken Byclosser" (その名も兄弟拳バイクロッサー, Sono na mo kyoudai ken Baikurossā; "The name is Brother Fist Byclosser")
  - Lyrics: Saburo Yatsude (八手 三郎, Yatsude Saburo)
  - Composition: Shunsuke Kikuchi (菊池 俊輔, Kikuchi Shunsuke)
  - Arrangement: Kouji Makaino (馬飼野 康二, Makaino Kouji)
  - Artist: Gentaro Takashi (高橋 元太郎, Takashi Gentaro)

Insert songs

- "Ore to omae wa Byclosser" (おれとおまえはバイクロッサー, Ore to omae wa Baikurossā; "You and me are Byclosser")
  - Lyrics: Saburo Yatsude (八手 三郎, Yatsude Saburo)
  - Composition: Kouji Makaino (馬飼野 康二, Makaino Kouji)
  - Arrangement: Ryou Kawakami (川上 了, Kawakami Ryou)
  - Artist: Makoto Fujiwara (藤原 誠, Fujiwara Makoto)
- "Go go! Ken Loader" (ゴーゴー! ケンローダー, Go go! Ken Roda)
  - Lyrics: Saburo Yatsude (八手 三郎, Yatsude Saburo)
  - Composition: Kouji Makaino (馬飼野 康二, Makaino Kouji)
  - Arrangement: Ryou Kawakami (川上 了, Kawakami Ryou)
  - Artist: Makoto Fujiwara (藤原 誠, Fujiwara Makoto)

== International broadcast ==
- In Thailand, the series received a Thai dub entitled song sing byclosser (สองสิงห์ไบครอสเซอร์ "two lions: byclosser") on Channel 7 on Saturdays and Sundays from 10:00 a.m. to 10:30 a.m. in 1986.
- The series was aired in Brazil as “Bycrosser”, by Rede Globo in 1991 and again in 1992.
- This series was broadcast in Indonesia by RCTI channel in 1994.
