= Koh (surname) =

Family name

- Language: Chinese (often Southern Min), German (via Serbo-Croatian), Korean

Origin
- Derivation: Chinese (許): probably toponymic, from the state of Xǔ; German: occupational, from Koch meaning "cook"

Other names
- Alternative spelling: Chinese (許): Xu, Hsu, Hui, Kho; German: Kuhač; Korean: Ko, Go

Koh is a surname in various cultures. Its languages of origin include Chinese, German (via its Serbo-Croatian spelling), and Korean.

== Origins ==
Koh may be a spelling of a number of Chinese surnames, listed below by their spelling in Hanyu Pinyin, which reflects the Standard Mandarin pronunciation:

- Xǔ (許/许), spelled Koh based on its pronunciation in various Southern Min dialects. The surname is frequently spelled this way in Malaysia and Singapore, where many descendants of Chinese migrants can trace their roots to Southern Min-speaking areas of China, namely Fujian and eastern Guangdong. Other spellings of the Southern Min pronunciation include Co, Ko, and Kho.
- Gāo (高), spelled Koh based on its Cantonese pronunciation
- Gù (顧/顾), spelled Koh based on its pronunciation in various Southern Min dialects
- Gū (辜), spelled Koh based on its pronunciation in various Southern Min dialects
- Gŭ (古), spelled Koh based on its pronunciation in various Southern Min dialects
- Ke (柯), spelled Koh based on its pronunciation in multiple varieties of Chinese including Hakka and Southern Min
- Kòu (寇), spelled Koh based on its pronunciation in multiple varieties of Chinese including Mandarin and Southern Min
- Huáng (黃), spelled Koh based on its pronunciation in various Southern Min dialects
- Hao (郝), spelled Koh based on its pronunciation in various Southern Min dialects

The surname Koh found among descendants of the Germans of Yugoslavia originated from the German surname Koch. The surname Kuhač is similarly derived.

As a Korean surname, Koh is a variant spelling of the surname most commonly spelled as Ko (based on its McCune–Reischauer transcription; Korean: 고; Hanja: 高; RR: Go).

== Statistics ==
Koh was the 10th-most common surname among ethnic Chinese in Singapore as of 1997 (ranked by English spelling, rather than by Chinese characters). Roughly 48,100 people, or 1.9% of the Chinese Singaporean population at the time, bore the surname Koh.

According to the 2000 South Korean census, there were 435,839 people in 135,488 households with the surname spelled Go in Revised Romanization. Among these, 325,950 people in 100,954 households were members of the Jeju Go clan. This surname is only infrequently spelled as Koh in South Korea: in a study based on a sample of applications for South Korean passports in 2007, 11.4% of applicants with this surname chose to spell it as Koh in the Latin alphabet, against 67.5% who chose to spell it as Ko, and 18.3% as Go.

The 2010 United States census found 3,595 people with the surname Koh, making it the 9,090th-most-common name in the country. This represented an increase from 2,893 (10,226th-most-common) in the 2000 Census. In both censuses, slightly fewer than nine-tenths of the bearers of the surname identified Asian.

== People ==
=== Classical music ===
- Koh Bunya (江文也; 1910–1983), Taiwanese composer educated in Japan, often known by the Japanese pronunciation of his Chinese name Chiang Wen-yeh
- Vladimir Koh (born 1964), Serbian violinist
- Joyce Beetuan Koh (born 1968), Singaporean composer
- Jennifer Koh (born 1976), American violinist of Korean descent
- Jeremy Koh (born 1989), Singaporean operatic tenor

=== Government and politics ===
- Koh Lay Huan (辜禮歡; died 1826), first Kapitan China of Penang
- Koh Eng Tian (born 1937), Singaporean lawyer, Solicitor-General (1981–1991)
- Tommy Koh (许通美; born 1937), Singaporean diplomat and international law specialist
- Koh Tsu Koon (许子根; born 1949), Malaysian politician from Penang
- Howard Koh (고경주; 高京柱; born 1952), American public health official of Korean descent
- Harold Hongju Koh (고홍주; 高洪株; born 1954), American lawyer of Korean descent, former State Department advisor
- Koh Juat Jong (born c. 1960), Singaporean lawyer, Solicitor-General (2008–2014)
- Koh Nai Kwong (古乃光; born 1961), Malaysian politician from Alor Gajah
- Lucy Koh (고혜란; born 1968), American judge of Korean descent
- Koh Poh Koon (许宝琨; born 1972), Singaporean politician and colorectal surgeon
- Janice Koh (许优美; born 1973), Singaporean politician

=== Popular culture ===
- Koh Chieng Mun (許靜雯; born 1960), Singaporean actress
- Dasmond Koh (许振荣; born 1972), Singaporean actor
- Chubby Hubby (born Aun Koh, 1972), Singaporean blogger, son of Tommy Koh
- Cynthia Koh (许美珍; born 1974), Singaporean actress
- Shinwon (born Koh Shinwon 고신원, 1995), South Korean singer-songwriter from Pentagon
- Sophie Koh (born c. 1980), New Zealand-born singer-songwriter
- Gerald Koh (许国欢;, born 1984), Singaporean radio personality
- Irene Koh (born 1990), South Korean-born comics artist in the United States
- Richie Koh (许瑞奇; born 1993), Singaporean actor
- Ryan Koh (fl. 2008–present), American television writer and producer

=== Sport ===
- Koh Eng Tong (1921–2006), Malaysian athlete and photographer
- Koh Hock Seng (许福成; born 1945), Malaysian field hockey player
- Koh Chong Jin (born 1947), Malaysian field hockey player
- Koh Eng Kian (born 1956), Singaporean judoka
- Koh Chun-son (고춘선; born 1954), North Korean long-distance runner
- Koh Suk-chang (고석창; born 1963), South Korean handball player
- Shinji Koh (高 信二; born 1967), Japanese baseball player
- Donald Koh (born 1968), Singaporean badminton player
- Desmond Koh (born 1973), Singaporean swimmer
- Gerald Koh (swimmer) (born 1978), Singaporean swimmer
- Koh Seng Leong (born 1983), Singaporean sailor
- Terence Koh (sailor) (born 1987), Singaporean sailor
- Koh Myong-jin (고명진; 高明桭; born 1988), South Korean footballer
- Michelle Koh (born 1990), Malaysian golfer
- Marcus Koh (许君豪; born 1993), Singaporean yo-yo performer

=== Other ===
- Roland Koh (许碧章; c. 1909–1972), Malaysian Anglican bishop
- Koh Se-kai (許世楷; born 1934), Taiwanese historian
- Koh Seow Chuan (born 1939), Singaporean architect
- Koh Boon Hwee (许文辉; born 1950), Singaporean businessman
- Raymond Koh (born 1954), Malaysian pastor abducted in 2017
- Koh Gou Young (고규영; born 1957), South Korean biologist
- Koh Ngiap Yong (许业荣; 1958–2000), Singaporean taxi driver and murder victim
- Koh Chai Hong (born 1959), Singaporean pilot
- Koh Dong-Jin (born 1961), South Korean businessman, former CEO of Samsung
- Koh Buck Song (许木松; born 1963), Singaporean writer
- Germaine Koh (born 1967), Malaysian-born Canadian conceptual artist
- Rena Koh (born c. 1970), Malaysian-born British fashion designer
- Terence Koh (born 1977), Chinese-born Canadian artist
- Cheryl Koh (born c. 1981), Singaporean pastry chef
- E. J. Koh (고은지; born 1988), American writer and translator of Korean descent
- Wei Hu Koh, named a Fellow of the Institute of Electrical and Electronics Engineers in 2013
- Joyce Koh, professor of higher education in New Zealand
