= 航 =

航, meaning “ ship, boat, to navigate”, is a Japanese unisex given name, may refer to:

- Kou (name) or Koh, Japanese masculine given name, notable person is Koh Masaki, Japanese gay pornographic film actor
- Wataru, Japanese unisex given name
