= Kanko (disambiguation) =

Kanko, Kankō, Kankou or Kankoh may refer to:

- Kankō (寛弘; 1004-1012) an era in Japanese history
- Kanko Stadium, Okayama, Japan
- Kanko, Korea, Empire of Japan; the Japanese occupation name for the North Korean city of Hamhung
- Kuda-gitsune (管狐, クダ狐), also called "kanko" (kanko-kitsune), a type of fox spirit in Japan used for spirit possession
- Kankoh-maru (観光-丸), a proposed reusable rocketship design
- Japanese barque Kankō Maru (観光-丸; 1850-1876), Japan's first steam-powered warship
- Japanese netlayer Kanko Maru (1940) (漢江-丸; 1940-1941), Japanese WWII warship

== People ==
- Assita Kanko (born 1980), Belgian journalist and politician
- Ilkka Antero Kanko (born 1934), Finnish chess champion
- Mühip Kanko (born 1965), Turkish politician
- Petr Kanko (born 1984), Czech ice hockey player
- Kankou Coulibaly (born 1990), Malian basketball player
- Kankou Musa, another name for Mansa Musa (1280-1337), emperor of Mali

== See also ==
- Ko-kan
- Kan (disambiguation)
- Ko (disambiguation)
- Kou (disambiguation)
- Koh (disambiguation)
