= Ichirō Murakoshi =

Japanese actor (1930–2007)

- 村越 伊知郎
- Murakoshi in 1973
- Born: Yoshikazu Murakoshi (村越 義一); December 2, 1930; Tokyo Prefecture, Japan
- Died: May 23, 2007 (aged 76)
- Education: Waseda University
- Occupations: Actor; voice actor; narrator
- Years active: 1950–2007
- Agent: Theater Echo (final affiliation)
- Notable credits: Sazae-san as Norisuke Namino; Doraemon as Nobisuke Nobi

Ichirō Murakoshi (村越 伊知郎, Murakoshi Ichirō; December 2, 1930 – May 23, 2007) was a Japanese actor, voice actor, and narrator from Tokyo, with his birth name being Yoshikazu Murakoshi (村越 義一, Murakoshi Yoshikazu).

He is best known for his voice acting roles as Norisuke Namino in Sazae-san and Nobita's father Nobisuke Nobi in Doraemon.

== Biography ==
Murakoshi was born on December 2, 1930, in Tokyo Prefecture.

He graduated from the School of Commerce, Waseda University. Ever since his school days, he had loved acting.

After he graduated from university, Murakoshi went to go work in the Tokyo Metropolitan Government for a while, but joined the Rengosa theater troupe in 1954. He was an affiliated member of Theater Echo since 1956.

He was active in a wide range of fields from dubbing to providing narration for tokusatsu, being beloved for his voice role as Norisuke Namino in the Sazae-san anime since he debuted in the role on December 14, 1969.

=== Final years ===
In July 1998, Murakoshi took a break from entertainment activities due to suffering from laryngeal cancer and stepped down from the role of Norisuke Namino on Sazae-san after voicing the character for many years. He returned to performing, but because it had become difficult to produce vocal sounds to his personal satisfaction, he decided to retire from voice acting and continued focusing on stage activities and training the younger generation.

=== Death ===
Murakoshi died on May 23, 2007, at the age of 76.

== Filmography ==
=== Television animation ===
- The Adventures of Tom Sawyer (role unspecified)
- Doraemon (Nobisuke Nobi)
- GeGeGe no Kitarō (Dracula)
- Gekisou Rubenkaiser (narrator)
- Genshi Shōnen Ryuu (Taka)
- Hello! Sandybell (Kankan)
- The Secret of Akko-chan (Akko's father)
- Kouya no Shōnen Isamu (Ned Wingate)
- Lady Oscar (Count Mercy)
- Marine Boy (role unspecified)
- Belle and Sebastian (role unspecified)
- Ōgon Bat (Dr. Yamatone)
- Sazae-san (Norisuke Namino)
- Seigi wo Aisuru Mono Gekko Kamen (role unspecified)
- Space Battleship Yamato (Genits, politician)
- Space Oz no Bouken (Dr. Oz, Moji's father)
- Wakakusa no Charlotte (Andre)
- Yattodetaman (role unspecified)
- Brave Raideen (Ichiro Hibiki)

=== Theatrical animation ===
- Farewell Space Battleship Yamato (Goenitz, Politician)
- GeGeGe no Kitaro: The Great Yōkai War (Unspecified role)
- Golgo 13: The Professional (E. Young)
- Lupin III: Mystery of Mamo (Scientist)
- Royal Space Force: The Wings of Honneamise (Airman)

=== Original video animation (OVA) ===
- Bubblegum Crash (Plant Chief)
- Legend of the Galactic Heroes (Schtaaden)
- Mashin Eiyuden Wataru: Warinaki Toki no Monogatari (Old Man)
- Sohryuden: Legend of the Dragon Kings (Forester)

=== Tokusatsu ===
- Space Amoeba (Space Amoeba)
- Kamen Rider (Arigabari, Sea-Dragon)
- Inazuman (Narrator)
- Fireman (Narrator)
- Bouken Rockbat (Narrator, Black Cloud Warujan)
- Skyrider (Komoljin, Haejigokujin, Elder Musasabader, Torikabuton)
- Kamen Rider Super-1 (Kamagirigan, Lonely Wolf Red Danger)
- Chodenshi Bioman (Narrator)

=== Dubbing ===
- The Blue Lagoon (1983 TBS edition) (Arthur Lestrange (William Daniels))
- Goldfinger (1978 NTV edition) (Felix Leiter (Cec Linder))
- Indiana Jones and the Last Crusade (Marcus Brody (Denholm Elliott))
- Serpico (1977 TV Asahi edition) (Jerry Berman (Lewis J. Stadlen))
