= Igano Kabamaru =

Japanese anime and manga series

- Cover of the first manga volume

伊賀野カバ丸
- Genre: Comedy; Coming-of-age
- Manga
- Written by: Yū Azuki
- Published by: Shueisha
- English publisher: Shueisha (digital)
- Magazine: Bessatsu Margaret
- Original run: August 1979 – February 1982
- Volumes: 12
- Anime television series
- Directed by: Tameo Kohanawa
- Produced by: Masamichi Fujiwara; Shigeji Tsuiki; Minoru Ohno; Toru Horikoshi
- Written by: Koichi Kobayashi; Shigeru Yanagawa; Tokio Tsuchiya; Tomomi Tsutsui
- Music by: Toshiyuki Kimori
- Studio: Group TAC; Toho
- Original network: Nippon Television
- Original run: 20 October 1983 – 29 March 1984
- Episodes: 24
- Live-action film
- Directed by: Norifumi Suzuki
- Studio: Toei Kyoto Co. Ltd
- Released: 6 August 1983
- Runtime: 96 min.

Igano Kabamaru (伊賀野カバ丸) is a Japanese manga series written and illustrated by Yū Azuki. The eponymous protagonist is a naive young ninja from the Iga province called Kagemaru (absolute shadow), nicknamed Kabamaru (hippo's mouth) for his insatiable appetite. Following the death of his strict grandfather and ninja sensei, Kabamaru moves to Tokyo with one of his grandfather's acquaintances. The plot primarily revolves around Kabamaru's adjustment to urban life after growing up in the mountains, his burgeoning feelings for his guardian's granddaughter, and his involvement in the rivalry between two private schools.

Igano Kabamaru has been adapted into both an anime series and a live-action film.

== Plot ==
Kabamaru was raised by his strict grandfather Saizō Igano (伊賀野才蔵, Igano Saizō), who trained him and another young orphan, Hayate Kirino (霧野疾風, Kirino Hayate) in the ninja arts. When Saizō dies, Kabamaru meets Saizō's old friend Ran Ookubo (大久保蘭, Ōkubo Ran). Following Saizō's request, Ran takes Kabamaru to Tokyo, where he is to stay in her house and attend her private school, Kin'gyoku. Kabamaru takes a liking to Ran's granddaughter Mai Ookubo (大久保麻衣, Ōkubo Mai), Ran's granddaughter, but she finds his coarse manners and endless appetite embarrassing and repulsive.

Kin'gyoku School has been engaged in a bitter rivalry with Ōgyoku School for half a century. Ran and Ōgyoku headmistress Suu Matsuno were romantic rivals for Saizō's love, while Shuu Maejima (前島秀, Maejima Shū), head of the Ōgyoku student council, and Shizune Mejiro (目白沈寝, Mejiro Shizune), a student council member at Kin'gyoku, are scions of feuding wealthy families. Kabamaru becomes an unwitting pawn of the student council members in their various machinations. Complicating matters is Hayate, who has been forced into Suu's employ after running away from Saizō's harsh training.

The rivalry escalates until Hayate kidnaps Mai, triggering an all-out confrontation between the students and staff of both schools and a duel between Hayate and a reluctant Kabamaru. Kabamaru prevails, seemingly causing Hayate to drown. However, Hayate is saved by Saizō, who had faked his death to introduce Kabamaru to the next stage of ninja training and the responsibilities of adulthood. Hayate and Kabamaru, now reconciled, decide to return with Saizō to the mountains to continue their training, but not before Mai reveals her newfound feelings for Kabamaru and they promise to meet again.

== Characters ==
- Kabamaru Igano: Ryūsei Nakao
  - Young Kabamaru: Masako Nozawa
- Mai Ookubo: Mai Tachihara
- Hayate Kirino: Hideyuki Tanaka
  - Young Hayate: Eiko Yamada
- Shizune Mejiro: Akira Kamiya
- Saizō Igano: Kenichi Ogata
  - Young Saizō: Ryūsei Nakao
- Ran Ookubo: Eiko Yamada
- Suu Matsuno: Masako Nozawa
- Vice Principal: Yūsaku Yara
- Kaoru Nonogusa: Youko Asagami
- Shirakawa: Daisuke Gōri
- Shū Maejima: Akio Nojima
- Futaba Mejiro: Kenjirō Ishimaru
- Kaname Mejiro: Shigeru Chiba

== Media ==
=== Manga ===
The Igano Kabamaru manga was serialized in Bessatsu Margaret from August 1979 to February 1982, with total 12 volumes of books released. The manga began publishing in English under the title Kabamaru Igano on Shueisha's Manga Million digital platform in 2026.

Volume list

Volume	Original Publication date	Japanese ISBN
1	September 1980	ISBN 4-08-850514-X
2	October 1980	ISBN 4-08-850522-0
3	November 1980	ISBN 4-08-850530-1
4	July 1981	ISBN 4-08-850593-X
5	August 1981	ISBN 4-08-850603-0
6	April 1982	ISBN 4-08-850660-X
7	May 1982	ISBN 4-08-850666-9
8	June 1982	ISBN 4-08-850673-1
9	February 1984	ISBN 4-08-850835-1
10	March 1984	ISBN 4-08-850840-8
11	September 1984	ISBN 4-08-850880-7
12	October 1984	ISBN 4-08-850882-3

In 2015 a new manga sequel of Igano Kabamaru was released, titled "Igano Kabamaru Sorikara" (伊賀野カバ丸★そりから) serialized in "Monthly YOU" magazine.

=== Anime ===
The anime series was produced by Group TAC and Toho. The 24 episodes were broadcast in Japan by Nippon Television between October 20, 1983, and March 29, 1984, every Thursday from 19:00 to 19:30.

Despite its low popularity in Japan, it became a cult classic in Greece, mainly due to the humorously low quality of its English-based dubbing.

The anime also gained a devoted audience in the Arabic peninsula, where it was broadcast dubbed in Arabic.

No.	Title	Original release date
1	"The Appearance of a Fascinating and Earnest Ninja"; Transliteration: "Omoshiro Majime Ja Ninja Sanjō" (Japanese: 面白まじめジャ忍者参上)	October 20, 1983
2	"The Unexpected Star!?"; Transliteration: "Omoigakezu ni Ninkimono!?" (Japanese: 思いがけずに人気者!?)	October 27, 1983
3	"One Fight! Yakisoba D"; Transliteration: "Fight Ippatsu! Yakisoba D" (Japanese: ファイト一発!ヤキソバD)	November 3, 1983
4	"Sweet-Mai-Sen Kabamaru"; Transliteration: "Sweet Mai Sen Kabamaru-kun" (Japanese: スイート麻衣せんカバ丸君)	November 10, 1983
5	"Mejiro Discovery Story"; Transliteration: "Mejiro Hakken Den" (Japanese: 目白発見伝)	November 17, 1983
6	"The Worrysome Transformation Game"; Transliteration: "Omoinayande Henshin Game" (Japanese: 思い悩んで変身ゲーム)	November 24, 1983
7	"The Yakisoba Runner's Loneliness"; Transliteration: "Yakisoba Runner no Kodoku" (Japanese: 焼きそばランナーの孤独)	December 1, 1983
8	"Anecdote! The Pair from the Village of Shinobi"; Transliteration: "Gaiden! Shinobi no Sato no Futari" (Japanese: 外伝!忍びの里の二人)	December 8, 1983
9	"So Enchanting! Kaoru The Kunoichi"; Transliteration: "Bakasemasu! Kunoichi Kaoru" (Japanese: 魅せます!くの一かおる)	December 15, 1983
10	"Jigsaw Love on Christmas Eve"; Transliteration: "Seiya no Jigsaw Rabu" (Japanese: 聖夜のジクソー・ラブ)	December 22, 1983
11	"Secret Formula! The Antidote of Revival"; Transliteration: "Hiden! Ikikaeri no Myōyaku" (Japanese: 秘伝!生き返りの妙薬)	December 29, 1983
12	"Dokkiri, the Guardman"; Transliteration: "Dokkiri the Guardman" (Japanese: どっきり・ザ・ガードマン)	January 5, 1984
13	"Don't Hug Shizune on the Bed"; Transliteration: "Bed de Shizune o Idakanaide" (Japanese: ベッドで沈寝を抱かないで)	January 12, 1984
14	"Chance Encounter Starlight"; Transliteration: "Meguriai Starlight" (Japanese: めぐり逢いスターライト)	January 19, 1984
15	"Shocking in Iga"; Transliteration: "Akirechikku in Iga" (Japanese: アキレチック・IN・伊賀)	January 26, 1984
16	"Justice of the Siblings of the Shinobi Village"; Transliteration: "Shinobi no Sato no Kyōdai Jingi" (Japanese: 忍びの里の兄弟仁義)	February 2, 1984
17	"You Are Troubled, Mai, LOVE"; Transliteration: "Nayamimasu Mai Love" (Japanese: 悩みます・麻衣・LOVE)	February 9, 1984
18	"The Man Who Calls Upon the Storm!"; Transliteration: "Arashi wo Yobu Otoko!" (Japanese: 嵐を呼ぶ男!)	February 16, 1984
19	"Mai's Detective Story"; Transliteration: "Mai no Tantei Monogatari" (Japanese: 麻衣の探偵物語)	February 23, 1984
20	"Classified First Love! Ran and Su"; Transliteration: "Maruhi Hatsukoi! Ran Sū Hyō" (Japanese: ㊙初恋!ラン・スー表)	March 1, 1984
21	"Secret Technique! Mystery of the Yakisoba Baseball"; Transliteration: "Hijutsu! Yakisoba Yakyū no Kai" (Japanese: 秘術!焼きソバ野球の怪)	March 8, 1984
22	"Raging Mai's Jack"; Transliteration: "Arashi no Mai Jack" (Japanese: 嵐の麻衣ジャック)	March 15, 1984
23	"Showdown in a Night Fog! A Man's Choices"; Transliteration: "Yogiri no Taiketsu! Otoko no Kejime" (Japanese: 夜霧の対決!男のケジメ)	March 22, 1984
24	"That One Day Which Is Called Sayonara Day"; Transliteration: "Iwayuru Hitotsu no Sayonara Day" (Japanese: いわゆるひとつのサヨナラDAY)	March 29, 1984

=== Film ===
A live action film based on the plot of the manga and the anime was released on August 6, 1983, directed by Norifumi Suzuki. It starred Hikaru Kurosaki as Kabamaru, Kumiko Takeda as Mai, Sanada Hiroyuki as Shizune and Sonny Chiba as Saizō.

The plot centers around a five-part competition between Kabamaru representing Kin'gyoku School, and Hayate representing Ōgyoku School. The five events are falling from a height on a balloon (Kabamaru wins), swimming (Hayate wins), throwing shuriken while horseriding (Kabamaru wins), food eating contest (Hayate wins - Kabamaru is disqualified because he missed an olive) and remaining on the roof of a car driven by a student of the opponent school (Kabamaru wins after being promised 1,000 plates of yakisoba noodles by Shijune).
