= Kokh =

Kokh may refer to:

- Kokh (tomb), a Middle Eastern type of tomb
- Kokh (wrestling), a traditional Armenian style of wrestling

== See also ==
- KOKH-TV, a TV station in Oklahoma, United States
- Kokh Kox, a deity of the Noon people of Senegal
- Alfred Kokh, Russian writer and economist
- Koch (disambiguation)
- Koh (disambiguation)
