= Jeremy Koh =

Singaporean operatic tenor

- 许智霖
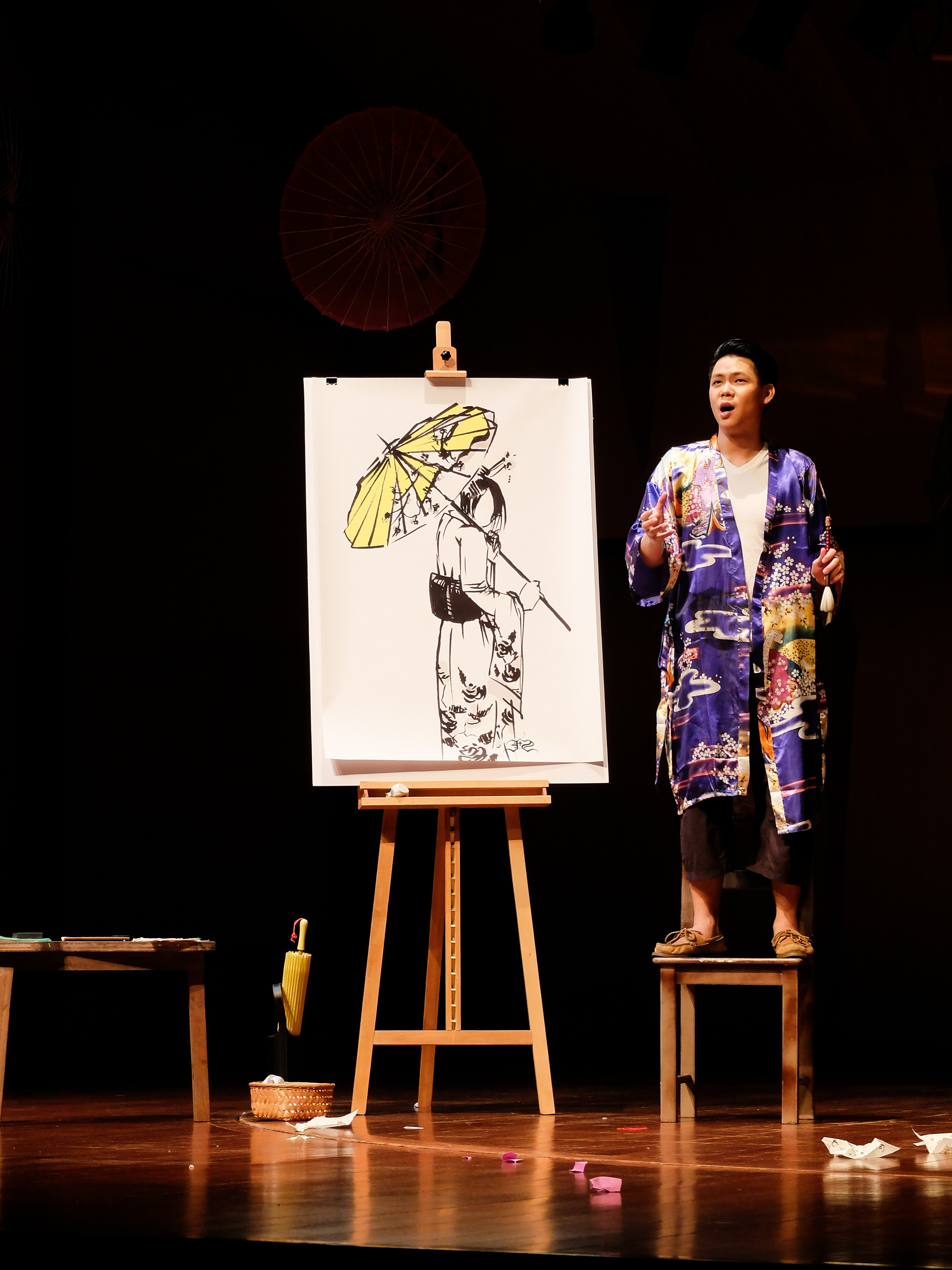
- Koh as Kornelis, in a production of "La Princesse Jaune", co-starring soprano Isyana Sarasvati.
- Education: Royal College of Music (London)
- Occupations: musician; lecture; art performer
- Years active: 2012 - present
- Height: 1.70 m (5 ft 7 in)
- Website: www.jeremykoh.com

Jeremy Koh (born 19 June 1989) is a Singaporean operatic tenor, adjunct voice lecturer at the Nanyang Academy of Fine Arts (NAFA), United World College South East Asia (East), and artistic director of the Spot Pocket Opera Theatre. In 2016, he was one only two auditionees successful in joining the Singapore Lyric Opera as a Leow Siak Fah Young Artist.

== Early life ==
Koh has a music diploma from NAFA, and Bachelor of Music degree from the Royal College of Music (London). He studied with tenors Shieh Yih Lim, Justin Lavender, Nicholas Sears; Soprano Jessica Chen, and baritone Stephen Roberts.

== Teaching and performance career ==
Koh is the first Singaporean to win the Tan Ngiang Kaw/Tan Ngiang Ann Memorial Vocal Competition. In 2013, he was awarded the certificate of special mention and bronze award at the 5th Bangkok Opera Foundation International Singing Competition.

Koh's operatic endeavors include Raoul de St. Brioche (The Merry Widow), Bastien (Bastien und Bastienne), Gingerbread Witch (Hansel and Gretel), Kornélis (La Princesse Jaune), Scholar Luo (Liu San Jie), Frantz (Le 66), Alfred (Die Fledermaus), Zacharia (The Blind Beggars) and He from the world premiere of Nicole Murphy's The Kamikaze Mind. As a concert soloist, he has sung in Beethoven’s Symphony No.9, Mozart's Requiem Mass in D minor, Bach's Magnificat in D Major, and the world premiere of Goh Toh Chai's Song of the Rising Wind.

Koh has collaborated with maestro Tsung Yeh, Lim Yau, Ashley Solomon, Volker Hartung, Somtow Sucharitkul, Joshua Kangming Tan, and Robert Casteels, and with organizations such as the Singapore Lyric Opera, Siam Philharmonic Orchestra, Singapore Chinese Orchestra, Spot Pocket Opera Theatre, New Opera Singapore, NAFA Symphony Orchestra, Ding Yi Music Company, and Flamenco Sin Fronteras.

While developing as a performer, Koh participated in community education and outreach efforts. He is currently an adjunct lecturer at the School of Music, Nanyang Academy of Fine Arts, and also teaches at the National Silver Academy, United World College Southeast Asia (East Campus) and Intune Music School.

Working with the Spot Pocket Opera Theatre, Koh has brought new programs to audiences at spaces in Singapore and Malaysia.
