= KOH =

Koh or KOH may refer to:

== Chemistry ==
- Potassium hydroxide, formula "KOH"
- KOH test, a procedure in which potassium hydroxide is used to dissolve skin and reveal fungal cells under the microscope

== People ==
- Koh (surname), a surname with various origins, including:
  - Xǔ (surname), a Chinese surname sometimes spelled as Koh based on its pronunciation in Southern Min dialects
  - Ko (Korean surname), occasionally spelled as Koh

People with the given name Koh include:

- Koh Gabriel Kameda (born 1975), German-Japanese concert violinist and violin teacher
- Koh Kojima or Kō Kojima (born 1928), Japanese manga artist
- Koh Masaki or Kō Masaki (1983–2013), Japanese gay pornographic film actor
- Koh Traoré (born 1989), Burkinabé born Ivorian football player
- Koh Yasuda (1907–1943), Japanese ophthalmologist, first director of Amami Wakoen Sanatorium, a leprosy sanatorium in Japan

== Places ==
- Koh (កោះ Kaôh [kɑh]), a Thai word meaning 'island', found in names of islands of Thailand
- Koh (เกาะ), a Thai meaning 'island', found in names of islands of Thailand
- Koh (کوه), a Dari word meaning 'mountain', found in names of mountains of Afghanistan
- Koh (کوه), an Urdu loanword from Persian meaning 'mountain', found in names of mountains of Pakistan

== Other ==
- Koh the Face Stealer, a character in Avatar: The Last Airbender
- King of the Hammers, an off-road race in Johnson Valley, California, United States

== See also ==
- Koh-i-Noor, a 105.6 carats (21.12 g) diamond
- Kou (disambiguation) (which might be confused due to similar pronunciation)
- KKOH, a radio station in Reno, Nevada, US
