= Kou (name) =

Chinese surname

Kòu (寇) is a Chinese surname. It originates as a title denoting status as a police officer, and is a shortened for of Sikou (司寇). A 2013 study found it was the 240th most common surname, shared by 380,000 people or 0.029% of the population, with the province with the most people being Henan.

Kou may refer to:

== People with Ko/Kou/Kow as the given name ==
- Kou Abhay (ກຸ ອະໄພ, 1892–1964), Prime Minister of the Kingdom of Laos
- Ko Arima (有馬 洪, born 1917), Japanese former football player
- Kou Fumizuki (文月 晃), Japanese manga artist
- Kou Gotou (後藤 航, born 1996), Japanese footballer
- Kō Kojima (小島 功, 1928 – 2015), Japanese manga artist
- Kou Luogon (born 1984), Liberian athlete
- Kō Machida (町田 康, born 1962), Japanese author, punk rock singer, poet and actor
- Kow Otani (大谷 幸, born 1957), Japanese music composer
- Ko Shibasaki (柴咲 コウ, born 1981), Japanese actress and singer
- Kou Voravong (ກຸ ວໍຣະວົງ, 1914–1954), Laotian politician
- Kou Yaginuma (柳沼 行, born 1973), Japanese manga artist

== People with Kou as the surname ==
- Kou Roun (fl. 1960s), Cambodian minister for national security
- Johanna Kou (born 1975), New Caledonian badminton player
- Kou Nai-han (顧乃涵; Gù Nǎihán, born 1982), Taiwanese volleyball player
- Kou Lei (Коу Лей, born 1987), Ukrainian table tennis player of Chinese origin
- Kou Qianzhi (寇謙之, 365–448), Taoist reformer
- Kou Tie (寇铁, born 1950), Chinese major general
- Kou Yingjie (寇英杰, 1880?-?), Chinese military leader
- Kou Zhun (寇準, 961–1023), chancellor during Emperor Zhenzong's reign
- Kou Zhichao (born 1989), Chinese volleyball player

== Fictional characters ==
- Kou Honda (本多 晃), a character from Terra Formars
- Kou Mukami (無神 コウ), a character from Diabolik Lovers
- Kō Nakano (中野 攻), a character from Ajin: Demi-Human
- Kou Tominaga (富永 コウ), a character from Wangan Midnight
- Sailor Starlights from Sailor Moon
  - Kou Seiya (星野 光), Named Sailor Star Fighter
  - Kou Taiki (大気 光), Named Sailor Star Maker
  - Kou Yaten (夜天 光), Named Sailor Star Healer
- Kou Uraki (コウ・ウラキ), a character from Mobile Suit Gundam 0083: Stardust Memory
- Kou Minamoto (源 光), a character from Toilet-Bound Hanako-kun
- Kou Mabuchi (馬渕 洸), a character from Ao Haru Ride

== See also ==
- Kou (disambiguation)
- Kou Zhu, fictional Song dynasty palace maid
