= Kou =

Kou or KOU may refer to

- Kou, Burkina Faso, a village in Burkina Faso
- Kou, Laiwu (口镇), town in Laicheng District, Laiwu, Shandong, China
- Kou language
- Kou (name) includes lists of people with the given name and surname
- Kou (surname) (寇), Chinese surname
- Kou Uraki, a character in the fictional Gundam universe
- Kou (Cordia subcordata), a tree species
- Kou, a main character in Kishiryu Sentai Ryusoulger
- KOU, the IATA code for Koulamoutou Airport, Gabon
- The old part of Honolulu, Hawaii, in the present downtown district

== Similar spelling ==
- Kō (lecture), a Japanese term for a lecture or a Buddhist service
- Kō Station (disambiguation), a train station in Japan.
- Ko fight Kō (Kou), in the board game Go
- Kugyō, also called Kō (Kou)
- Gong (title) and Gong (surname), called Japanese Kō (Kou)
- Duke or Prince, called Japanese Kō (Kou)
- Kō, the Hawaiian word for Saccharum officinarum

== See also ==
- KO (disambiguation)
- KOH (disambiguation)
- Gong (disambiguation)
