= MegaBeast Investigator Juspion =

Television series

- Genre: Tokusatsu; Action adventure Superhero fiction Science fantasy Comedy
- Created by: Saburō Yatsude
- Developed by: Shozo Uehara
- Directed by: Yoshiaki Kobayashi
- Starring: Hikaru Kurosaki; Kiyomi Tsukada; Hiroshi Watari; Junichi Haruta
- Narrated by: Tōru Ōhira
- Composer: Michiaki Watanabe
- Country of origin: Japan
- No. of episodes: 46

Production
- Running time: 25 minutes
- Production companies: Toei Company; Asatsu-DK

Original release
- Network: TV Asahi
- Release: March 15, 1985 – March 24, 1986

Related
- Space Sheriff Shaider; Jikuu Senshi Spielban

MegaBeast Investigator Juspion (巨獣特捜ジャスピオン, Kyojū Tokusō Jasupion), also known as Space Wolf Juspion or simply Juspion, is a Japanese tokusatsu television series and part of the Metal Hero Series franchise. Produced by Toei Company, it was originally broadcast from 15 March 1985 to 24 March 1986, running for 46 episodes. For distribution purposes, Toei refers to this television series as Juspion.

== Plot ==
While reading the Galactic Bible, the space hermit Edjinn learns of a shocking prophecy: When the dark god Satan Goth awakens, the universe will be ravaged by giant monsters filled with rage. After Satan Goth appears and the prophecy is set in motion, Edjinn orders Juspion, who Edjinn has been tutoring, to stop him and combat the corrupted MegaBeasts. Juspion travels with his friends Anri the android and Miya the alien across the galaxy in his battleship Daileon to confront Satan Goth and his army. Eventually, Juspion lands on Earth, which, it turns out, is a prolific source of MegaBeasts (It is explained that the dinosaurs were part of that group), and many of them are still asleep in various locations.

Amongst Juspion's arsenal is his suit of armor Metal Tech, made of a very rare mineral called Edjinium and equipped with a visor called Sensor Eye that can scan the environment with x-ray and night vision. He also wields a Plasma Blazer Sword, which he can contract for storage and infuse with plasma during combat, and a Beam Scanner Gun. His warship Daileon also houses the Super Planetary Combat Tank Garbin, which doubles as the Garbin Jet, and a motorcycle called Super Planetary Machine Iron Wolf. Daileon itself can transform into a giant robot called Super Planetary Battle Giant Daileon. Daileon is frequently Juspion's final and most devastating tool to be used against MegaBeasts.

== Characters ==
=== Daileon crew ===
Based on the silver Super Planetary Battleship Daileon (超惑星戦闘母艦ダイレオン, Chō Wakusei Sentō Bokan Daireon), Juspion travels across worlds to pursue Satan Goth. When facing a rampaging MegaBeast, Juspion converts Daileon into the Super Planetary Combat Giant Daileon (超惑星戦闘巨人ダイレオン, Chō Wakusei Sentō Kyojin Daireon) to defeat MegaBeasts with its Cosmic Crash double punches.

- Juspion (ジャスピオン, Jasupion)
  The main hero of the series, Juspion is an orphan raised by Edjinn, until he embarks on his quest to fight the MegaBeasts and defeat Satan Goth. Juspion travels between planets to stop Satan Goth until he arrives on Earth. His Metal-Tech suit is made from the very rare galactic mineral Edjinium and grants superhuman capabilities to its owner. The name "Juspion" is a portmanteau of "Justice" and "Champion"
- Anri (アンリ, Anri)
  An android created by Edjinn, she is Juspion's companion in his journey. Being a machine, Anri is immune to evil powers.
- Rare-Beast Miya (宇宙の珍獣ミーヤ, Uchū no Chinjū Mīya)
  A baby alien creature found by Juspion and Anri on planet Beezee when her parents were killed saving them from the native hunters. Soon after, Juspion adopts Miya as a pet. She is very friendly, intelligent, sociable and an excellent cook. She originally doesn't speak, sometimes only repeating her name, until Anri teaches her to speak properly beginning in episode 22.

==== Vehicles ====
- Super Planetary Machine Iron Wolf (超惑星マシーン アイアンウルフ, Chō Wakusei Mashīn Aian Urufu)
  Juspion's silver motorcycle.
- Super Planetary Combat Tank Garbin (超惑星戦車 ガービン, Chō Wakusei Sensha Gābin)
  Juspion's silver tank, which splits into the Garbin Tank with twin drills and the Garbin Jet.

==== Allies ====
- Edjinn (エジン, Ejin)
  A space hermit and scientist, Edjinn is the descendant of prophets who defended the Galactic Bible for millennia. While raising Juspion, he serves as Juspion's spiritual guide and mentor. He sacrifices his own life at the end of the series by confronting Satan Goth alone to give Juspion the time he needs to find the "Galactic Tarzan".
- Boome-Run (ブーメラン, Būmeran)
  After his older brother, an Interpol investigator, was killed by Satan Goth's forces, this medical student vowed revenge and became an International US Marshal, fighting with his twin boomerangs. The name "Boome-Run" is a portmanteau of "Boomerang" and "Home Run".
- The Nanbara Family
  Photographer Kenichirou Nanbara (南原 健一郎, Nanbara Ken'ichirō), his older daughter Kanoko Nanbara (南原 かの子, Nanbara Kanoko) and his younger son Kenta Nanbara (南原 健太, Nanbara Kenta) became closely linked with Juspion when Kenichirou took a photo of the Golden Bird. It turned out that Kanoko was one of the five children chosen by the Golden Bird to house its power until the time came.
- Gary and Hannah (ケーリーとハンナ, Kērī to Hanna)
  Juspion's biological parents, they worked for the health of animals across the galaxy. Gary was an animal caretaker for the Galactic Federation while Hannah was a zoologist. They were both killed when their wrecked spaceship, attacked by Zampa, fell on Edjinn's Planet. They both reappeared as spirits to help Juspion defeat Zampa.
- The Golden Bird (黄金の鳥, Ōgon no Tori)
  The guardian phoenix god of the galaxy, a manifestation of the energies of righteousness. The bird scattered itself into seven lights that choose Juspion, Kanoko, along with four other children, and a baby born from the light to serve as its vessels until all seven are brought together so that Golden Bird can leave their bodies and become whole again for the final battle with Satan Goth, turning itself into a Golden Sword (黄金の剣, Ōgon no Tsurugi) used by Daileon to slay Super Satan Goth.
- Tarzan (ターザン, Tāzan)
  A baby mentioned in a prophecy in the Galactic Bible born from one of the seven lights of the Golden Bird, he landed on Earth, sleeping in a life support pod, as the sole survivor of a spaceship attacked by pirates. Juspion saw himself in the baby and named him Tarzan, adopting the child after Super Satan Goth's defeat.

=== MegaBeast Empire ===
- Satan Goth (サタンゴース, Satan Gōsu)
  A being born of the negative energy of the cosmos, the great god-demon whose revival was foretold in the Galactic Bible with the power to enrage the creatures, turning them in vicious monsters. Satan Goth's objective is to create a MegaBeast Empire in the galaxy and rule it from the Planet of the MegaBeasts. Originally a giant pupil stage resembling a cross between Darth Vader and Megatron, in the endgame arc, Satan Goth reaches the peak of his power and molts to become Great Satan Goth (大サタンゴース, Dai Satan Gōsu), possessing a Cthulhu-like appearance and the power to bend nature to his will, turning cities into forests overnight. He was defeated by the Daileon Cosmic Harley (ダイレオンコズミックハーレー, Daireon Kozumikku Hārē) attack where Daileon brandished a Golden Sword created by the Golden Bird in the final episode.
- Madgallant (マッドギャラン, Maddogyaran)
  The son of Satan Goth and his heir to the MegaBeast Empire. Juspion's antagonist throughout the series, he is capable of fighting him with his sword (similar to Juspion's) and with his black VTOL 6-legged insectoid walker/plane. He wears a reminiscent black Metal-Tech suit similar to Juspion's and can take on human form. Madgallant is destroyed once by Juspion in episode 29, but is soon resurrected by Gilza; in the penultimate episode of the series, he has a climatic final battle with Juspion. After being badly injured by Juspion in this battle and furious by refusing to admit that a "mere human" could be stronger than a super life-form, he turns himself into a giant Satan Goth for a few moments, similar to his father's first form, and tries to attack the hero, but due to being previously wounded he returns to his original form and dies right after.
- Amazonesses (アマゾネス, Amazonesu)
  Two revived Amazon women created under Madgallant's rule in order to locate the long-extinct Pirazar and revive it as a weapon against Juspion.
- The Four Evil Warlords (悪の四天王, Aku no Shitennō)
  The hirelings of Madgallant.
  - Ikki (イッキ)
    The top-ranking ruthless bodyguard in the galaxy. Born in a planet located at the other extreme of the galaxy, he was the first enemy in the entire series to be killed via Juspion's fatal attack Cosmic Halley. His main weapon was a trident that could blow fire from its bottom tip, and he could also fire his own clenched fists like jet-propelled explosive projectiles.
  - Zampa (ザンパ, Zanpa)
    Evil android who wrongly blamed Gary and Hannah for mobilizing the Galactic Federation against him and destroying his Machine Empire. As revenge, Zampa attacked Juspion's family's spaceship, forcing a disastrous crash land that killed them both, leaving only Juspion to survive. His main weapon was a kusarigama, and he transformed into his android form with superior strength and endurance, and the ability to fire concussive lasers from his eyes. Still, even so Juspion managed to destroy him, thus avenging his deceased family.
  - Brima (ブリマ, Burima) and Gyol (ギョール, Gyōru)
    The two women who became Madgallant's personal bodyguards after Ikki's and Zampa's deaths by Juspion. Brima is a dark prophet with white clothing and a ball-shaped helmet, her main weapons were a crystal ball and occasional magic daggers; Gyol is a spy and disguise master clad in basic red and black space armor, her main weapon is a combination of spear/flute/blowgun, not only could she shoot the blade on the end forward to explode against Juspion, but she could also play a tune on it to transform herself and others into different forms (such as disguising herself into a bird to spy on others, or to turn other people into animals to get this one boy to use his skills to draw Juspion being defeated). She could also use the flute to control others' minds but as a result of Juspion's power armor he was immune to her flute, however, she could cause him to suffer vertigo so as to teleport herself and others to safety. In their final appearance, their weapons were destroyed by Juspion, resulting in them magically combining themselves into a wolf-beast form to attack Juspion, who defeated the beast with his Cosmic Halley fatal attack, killing both.
- Zamurai (ザムライ)
  A sea coral-shielded seal-faced undead samurai warrior who lived deep in the sea since his imprisonment 900 years ago - in a flashback explaining that time, under his real name Tokifusa Unno, Zamurai planned to kill respected general Minamoto no Yoritomo for the Heikei in exchange for a huge reward, but he was defeated by Minamoto and was imprisoned in the sea, bringing forth his current story; back to present day, he and Madgallant worked on a plan to create dolphin missile-launchers to destroy submarines and battleships around the world in exchange for control over the MegaBeast Empire's dolphin farm. Zamurai fights with a spear and hidden swords and is practically immortal thanks to leeching off of his MegaBeast Seablur's life force.
- Girarist (ギラリスト, Girarisuto)
  A mariachi-looking space murderer (with his own Mexican-sounding background music). He lured Juspion into a cave to study all of the hero's weapons and powers in order to kill and entomb him forever. Girarist was the only villain in the whole series not to die at Juspion's hands (it is even uncertain if Girarist is really dead after the cave collapsed on him).
- Enchantress Chikita (魔女千北, Majo Chikita)
  Brima's teacher of dark arts, she placed a curse on Kanoko to try to discover where the Golden Bird is. She had many supernatural abilities, including powers of illusion and shooting spider webs from her hands to entangle Juspion. She also used her pet giant Spida to attack Juspion, aiding it by using her illusions to make it impossible for any enemy to detect her true location. Juspion later discovered that Spida was an illusion made by Chikita and fired his Daileon Beam at it.
- Gasami brothers (ガサミ兄弟, Gasami Kyodai)
  Space mercenary brothers who pillaged and destroyed several planets (amidst them Koko's planet Dodo). Gasami the Younger (ガサミ弟, Gasami Otōto) is first terminated by Juspion; in a devilish attempt to avenge his brother, Gasami the Elder (ガサミ兄, Gasami Ani) (along with MegaBeast Boga) tackles the hero and gets destroyed as well.
- Cutie Girls (キューティーガールズ, Kyūtī Gāruzu)
  A trio of young evil women composed of Cutie Ace (キューティーエース, Kyūtī Esu), Cutie Heart (キューティーハート, Kyūtī Hāto) and Cutie Queen (キューティークイーン, Kyūtī Kuīn). They kidnapped young people and turned them into bestial creatures under Madgallant's control by draining their essence. Their true form is the Cerberus-like Triple-Faced Bestial Warrior (三面獣人戦士, Sanmen Jūjin Senshi).
- AI-GER Man (アイガーマン, Aigāman)
  An android with a western face who extensively studied Juspion's and Daileon's attributes in order to predict their attacks. He and his MegaBeast AI-GER could only be defeated when Juspion performed a new fighting move unknown to AI-GER Man, causing the latter's downfall.
- Galactic Witch Gilza (銀河魔女ギルザ, Gingamajo Giruza)
  An alien witch who was responsible for bringing Madgallant back to life when he was first defeated in battle by Juspion. Gilza is precisely an expert in curses and general dark arts. Gilza had successfully removed Juspion's soul with a potion but it was returned to him shortly after. She had with her an enchanted knife that was her focus in battle and used it to try to remove Juspion's soul during the last fight. Her knife was the only thing that could harm her and Juspion used it to weaken her and finally defeat Gilza with the Cosmic Halley attack.
- Silk (シルク, Shiruku), Genga (ゲンガ), and Zauru (ザウル)
  Three yakuza-styled mobsters (Silk is human while Genga and Zauru are his cyborg hirelings), hunted down incessantly by Boome-Run for provoking several wars in the world. They allied with Madgallant in a double, menacing plan of kidnapping several children and demanding a ransom in the form of gold bars stolen from the Japan National Bank. This plan, however, was to divert Juspion and US Marshal Boome-Run's attention while Madgallant worked on his plan: to sink Japan's islands into the ocean by nuking them with small nuclear warheads. Silk is perhaps the only human in the entire series to be defeated by Juspion's Cosmic Halley attack, perishing along with his two bodyguards.
- Chip (チップ, Chippu)
  An old alien scientist from Planet L who sells Helper Robots on Earth that are really lethal weapons working for Satan Goth to rig bombs to people's appliances.
- Alien Braggle (異星人 ブラグル, Iseijin Buraguru)
  a reptilian-looking alien specializing in culinary arts, he created an evil duplicate of Miya in order to lure Juspion into a devious trap involving poisoned food. Braggle can fire small powerful energy orbs and fights with a rapier.
- Gilmaza (ギルマーザ, Girumāza)
  The "Specter Queen" of the Dark Galaxy and Gilza's elder sister, debuting shortly after Gilza's death. In order to receive some of Satan Goth's evil power, Gilmaza infiltrated several planets across the universe and slowly caused the extinction of these civilizations through futile strategies - such as, in Planet Zabos, by prophesizing the youth to the Church of Satan Goth, corrupting them and causing the planet to spiral into crime; or, in Planet Sweet, by cleverly manipulating the leaders of East and West, leading them ultimately to nuclear war disguised as a sorceress. She died with Madgallant's foot soldiers after Satan Goth was killed and the energy he released vaporized them all. She has her Space Ninjas as her top soldiers.
- Space Ninjas (宇宙忍者, Uchū Ninja)
  Gilmaza's top soldiers created through her black magic, they wear suits of black armor differing only in the color of their forehead plates (which name them after the element they represent, in a conception taken directly from Taoism). They all have two "default attacks" (a plasmic projectile with the same color of their forehead plates and a kind of "plasma sword", both channeled via their hands) and one peculiar fighting "special technique" (except for Water). They only revealed their true forms after having their heads split open by Juspion's Plasma Blazer Sword.
  - Space Ninja Fire (宇宙忍者 カ, Uchū Ninja Ka; Red forehead plate)
    Apparently the group's leader. His "special technique" consists of him jumping above a jet of fire and then rushing into the enemy, strongly hitting him with an explosion; his true form is of a meteor/comet, referred to as the Fire Magma Shell, which fuels the Wind Cannon.
  - Space Ninja Wind (宇宙忍者 フウ, Uchū Ninja Fū; Yellow/Golden forehead plate)
    His "special technique" is similar to Fire's but using wind instead of fire; his true form is of a cannon which springs out of his neck, referred to as the Wind Cannon, fueled by Fire Magma Shell.
  - Space Ninja Earth (宇宙忍者 ドウ, Uchū Ninja Dō; White/Silver forehead plate)
    His "special technique" has him burrowing deep into the earth to provoke massive earthquakes or ambush careless enemies; his true form is of a flying skeletal centipede-like demon that has powerful jaws, can project plasma discharges and create a holographic illusion of itself with double size, thus increasing attack power.
  - Space Ninja Water (宇宙忍者 スイ, Uchū Ninja Sui; Blue forehead plate)
    Unlike the other four ninjas, he never exhibited any "special technique" of his own, thus being limited to default attacks; his true form is of a kind of spiked satellite/steel orb which shoots powerful electric discharges and sticks physically into any surface to drain energy through physical contact.
  - Space Ninja Wood (宇宙忍者 モク, Uchū Ninja Moku; Green forehead plate)
    His "special technique" allows him to fire green gravity beams from his fingertips; his true form is of a space fighter wearing white clothing with a horrible demonic mask and fighting with a naginata, in similarity with a kabuki artist.
- Tiger Joe (タイガージョー, Taigā Jō)
  A bounty hunter whose reputation reached the Dark Galaxy that was brainwashed by Gilmaza to kill his best friend Juspion.
- The MegaBeast Empire also is shown to have a rather diverse troop of unnamed foot soldiers.

==== MegaBeasts ====
- MegaBeast Marigos (巨獣 マリゴス, Kyojū Marigosu)
  This monster appeared in episode 1. Its powers include asexual reproduction, mouth energy balls, and mouth flames.
- MegaBeast Hanedar (巨獣 ハネダー, Kyojū Hanedā)
  This monster appeared in episode 1. Its powers include flight and talons.
- MegaBeast Tetsugoth (巨獣 テツゴス, Kyojū Tetsugosu)
  This monster appeared in episode 2. Its powers include burrowing, freezing mist from the mouth, eye energy blasts, and a whip tail.
- MegaBeast Namagerath (巨獣 ナマゲラス, Kyojū Namagerasu)
  This monster appeared in episodes 3 and 25. Its powers include mouth flames and a forehead horn. It is the only MegaBeast to appear in multiple episodes.
- MegaBeast Gaios (巨獣 ガイオス, Kyojū Gaiosu)
  This monster appeared in episode 4. Its powers include swimming, burrowing, mouth flames, a launchable back shell with extendable spikes, and explosive mouth mist.
- Unnamed MegaBeast
  This unnamed MegaBeast appeared in episode 5. Its powers include dimensional traveling, a fanged trunk, and twin tusks.
- Gelgon (ゲルゴン, Gerugon)
  This monster appeared in episode 6. Its parent can burrow, shoot mouth flames, and shoot body sparks that grant flight.
- MegaBeast Iwagorilla (巨獣 イワゴリーラ, Kyojū Iwagorīra)
  This monster appeared in episode 7. Its powers include internal tentacles, a rocking body, and a mouth mist.
- MegaBeast Onideviler (巨獣 オニデビラー, Kyojū Onidebirā)
  This monster appeared in episode 8. Its powers include absorbing smaller lifeforms and twin-head horns.
- MegaBeast Kidamar (巨獣 キダマー, Kyojū Kidama)
  This monster appeared in episode 9, created from a lone Tree Spirit. Its powers include flight, intense cedar pollen from the mouth, burrowing by spinning, ensnaring roots, and explosive mouth spears.
- MegaBeast Pirazahl (巨獣 ピラザール, Kyojū Pirazāru)
  This monster appeared in episode 10, created from the fossil of the long extinct Pirazarr. Its powers include swimming, pressurized water from the top mouth, and reinforced scales.
- MegaBeast Gamagorath (巨獣 ガマゴラス, Kyojū Gamagorasu)
  This monster appeared in episode 11. Its powers include life-enhancing body oil that will also turn the subject berserk, burrowing, a long tongue, mouth flames, and teleportation.
- MegaBeast Kabegonta (巨獣 カベゴンタ, Kyojū Kabegonta)
  This monster appeared in episode 13, created from a page of a child's comic book when blown onto a stone slab. Its powers include size-changing, shape-shifting via sight, sand-reducing touch, and teleportation.
- MegaBeast Umiking (巨獣 ウミキング, Kyojū Umikingu)
  This monster appeared in episode 14. Its powers include swimming, a high resistance to heat, a long tail for whipping and coiling and turning fire into its own energy.
- MegaBeast Portsanky (巨獣 ポートサンキ, Kyojū Pōtosanki)
  This monster appeared in episode 15. Its powers include burrowing and explosive mouth mist.
- The Dymanian (ダイマ星人, Daimaseijin)
  This monster appears in episode 16. Its powers include extendable arms that read/wipe minds, antennae energy bolts, and holograms.
- MegaBeast Head-Dreamer (巨獣 ヘッド•ドリマー, Kyojū Heddo-Dorimā)
  This monster appeared in episode 17. Its powers include invisibility, mouth suction, internal tentacles, burrowing, a detachable head on the tail, and holograms.
- MegaBeast Umiblur (巨獣 ウミブラー, Kyojū Umiburā)
  This monster appeared in episode 19. Its powers include swimming, a howitzer cannon on each shoulder, and an anchor. It was also the granter of Zamurai's immortality factor.
- MegaBeast Hakaburn (巨獣 ハカバーン, Kyojū Hakabān)
  This monster appeared in episode 20. Its powers include mouth flames and a pair of Kama.
- MegaBeast Magnadar (巨獣 マグナダー, Kyojū Magunadā)
  This monster appeared in episode 21. Its powers include electromagnetic hurricanes and a falcata.
- MegaBeast Kumorda (巨獣 クモーダ, Kyojū Kumōda)
  This monster appeared in episode 22. Its powers include levitation, teleportation, mouth webs, spear legs, explosive eye flashes, and illusions, itself being an illusion created by Chikita.
- MegaBeast Shishion (巨獣 シシオーン, Kyojū Shishiōn)
  This monster appeared in episode 23. Its powers include high jumping, reinforced teeth, and mouth flames. Since it was a tamed MegaBeast, Juspion had to unwillingly kill it in a very heart-breaking scene due to Satan Goth's deep possession.
- MegaBeast Mok (巨獣 モク, Kyojū Moku)
  This monster appeared in episode 24. Its powers include eye electric bolts, burrowing, an extendable tongue, and arm whips.
- MegaBeast Donges (巨獣 ドンゲス, Kyojū Dongesu)
  This monster appeared in episode 25. Its powers include burrowing, pincer claw hands, psychic explosions, head mandibles that emit energy surges, and tail energy blasts.
- MegaBeast Boga (巨獣 ボーガー, Kyojū Bōgā)
  This monster appeared in episode 26. Its powers include an extendable energy-draining trunk and nose flames.
- MegaBeast Sodomon (巨獣 ソドモン, Kyojū Sodomon)
  This monster appeared in episode 27. Its powers include burrowing, mouth mist, and creating illusions.
- MegaBeast AI-GER (巨獣 アイガー, Kyojū Aigā)
  This robotic monster appeared in episode 28. Its powers include the Go-Boomerang saw for the right arm, burrowing, a torso drill, and replacing his left hand with a hammer or wrecking ball.
- MegaBeast Gasler (巨獣 ガスラー, Kyojū Gasurā)
  This monster appeared in episode 29. Its powers include explosive toxic gas from body and mouth tubes and burrowing.
- MegaBeast Balloom (巨獣 バルーム, Kyojū Barūmu)
  This monster appeared in episode 30. Its powers include flight, spawning balloon lifeforms, and a balled tail that emits explosive sparks.
- MegaBeast Deathchillas (巨獣 デスチラス, Kyojū Desuchirasu)
  This monster appeared in episode 31 that was also a time bomb. Its powers include swimming, depth charges from the mouth, and fast burrowing.
- MegaBeast Mazin (巨獣 マジン, Kyojū Majin)
  This monster appeared in episode 33. Its powers include a red electrical shield, illusionary MegaBeasts that emit electric shocks, and mouth flames.
- MegaBeast Phodon (巨獣 フォードン, Kyojū Fōdon)
  This robotic monster appeared in episode 34. Its powers include a head cannon and a missile on each foot. It reappears later in episode 42, rebuilt as a wheeled guardian tank. Its powers now include four wrecking balls in the top, and a drill in the head in addition to the head cannon from its original form.
- MegaBeast Jimushi (巨獣 ジムシ, Kyojū Jimushi)
  This monster appeared in episode 36. Its powers include fast burrowing and sharp claws.
- MegaBeast Ebizohl (巨獣 エビゾール, Kyojū Ebizōru)
  This monster appeared in episode 37. Its powers include a right-hand claw and a left-hand fork.
  - "Miya's MegaBeast Form"
    Really Prawnzole in disguise with Brima's help as part of Madgallant's plan to destroy Juspion. Its powers include high jumping, reinforced teeth, and mouth flames.
- MegaBeast Aquarocky (巨獣 アクアロッキー, Kyojū Akuarokkī)
  This monster appeared in episode 38. Its only known power is burrowing. It was also the only monster in the entire series who couldn't land a single hit on Daileon before being completely destroyed by it.
- MegaBeast Diagorath (巨獣 ディアゴラス, Kyojū Diagorasu)
  This monster appeared in episode 40. Its powers include creating fake diamonds from the skin, burrowing, and tail lasers.
- MegaBeast Destran (巨獣 デストラン, Kyojū Desutoran)
  This monster appeared in episode 41. Its powers include burrowing, tentacle hair, a knife for each hand, and eye energy bolts.
- MegaBeast Badorgez (巨獣 バドルゲズ, Kyojū Badorugezu)
  The final monster of the series appeared in episode 44. Its powers include a mouth machine gun and mouth flames. It is the only MegaBeast destroyed by the Juspion Cosmic Halley, Meteor Slash (ジャスピオンコズミックハレー流星斬り, Jasupion Kozumikku Harē Ryūsei Giri) attack, as he was unable to call for Daileon in a Super Satan Goth Zone.

== Episodes ==
On January 6, 1986 (The day that episode 35 aired) the show later aired on Mondays instead of Fridays.

1. Planet of the Giant Beasts (巨大怪獣の惑星, Kyodai Kaijū no Wakusei): written by Shozo Uehara, directed by Yoshiaki Kobayashi
2. Tragedy of the Super-A.I. Planet Sakura (悲しみの超電子星サクラ, Kanashimi no Chōdenshisei Sakura): written by Shozo Uehara, directed by Yoshiaki Kobayashi
3. Protect this Galactic Boy's Dreams! (守れ! 銀河少年の夢, Mamore! Ginga Shōnen no Yume): written by Shozo Uehara, directed by Takeshi Ogasawara
4. Set Course for the Third Planet (第3惑星に進路を取れ, Daisan Wakusei ni Shinro o Tore): written by Shozo Uehara, directed by Takeshi Ogasawara
5. Look! That's Your Dad's Star (ほら! あれが父さん星だ, Hora! Are ga Tōsan Hoshi Da): written by Shozo Uehara, directed by Michio Konishi
6. The Child Beast and the Children (子供獣と子供たち, Kodomojū to Kodomotachi): written by Shozo Uehara, directed by Michio Konishi
7. Super-Powered Rock-Gorilla's Massive Counterattack (怪力イワゴリーラの大逆襲, Kairiki Iwagorīra no Dai Gyakushū): written by Shozo Uehara, directed by Takeshi Ogasawara
8. Shining Smiles Over Green Fields: Lott and Sachi's Flight (草原に輝く笑顔・ロットとサチが駈ける, Sōgen ni Kagayaku Egao! Rotto to Sachi ga Kakeru): written by Shozo Uehara, directed by Takeshi Ogasawara
9. A Certain Tree's Tale (ある巨木のものがたり, Aru Kyoboku no Monogatari): written by Shozo Uehara, directed by Makoto Tsuji
10. The Female Spies and the Ancient Mystery Fish (女スパイを連れた古代怪魚, Onna Supai o Tsureta Kodai Kaigyo): written by Shozo Uehara, directed by Makoto Tsuji
11. Ribbit! The March of Tsukuba's Giant Frog (グェッ! ツクバの巨大ガマ大行進, Gue! Tsukuba no Kyodai Gama Dai Kōshin): written by Shozo Uehara, directed by Takeshi Ogasawara
12. Satan Goth fears the Divine Prophecy (神秘の大予言にサタンゴースがおびえる, Shinpi no Daiyogen ni Satan Gōsu ga Obieru): written by Shozo Uehara, directed by Takeshi Ogasawara
13. Assistance from Space: Rampage of the Four Evil Warlords (宇宙からの助っ人 大暴れ悪の四天王, Uchū kara no Suketto Ōabare Aku no Shitennō): written by Shozo Uehara, directed by Michio Konishi
14. Break up the Japanese Islands! Operation: Attack Lake Hamana (日本列島を断て! 浜名湖アタック作戦, Nihon Rettō o Tate! Hamanako Atakku Sakusen): written by Shozo Uehara, directed by Michio Konishi
15. Dream or Illusion? The Golden Bird Takes Flight (夢か? 幻か? はばたく黄金の鳥, Yume ka? Maboroshi ka? Habataku Ōgon no Tori): written by Shozo Uehara, directed by Takeshi Ogasawara
16. Is this the Future of Humanity? The Fearsome MegaBeast Empire (人類の未来か? 恐怖の巨獣帝国, Jinrui no Mirai ka? Kyōfu no Kyojū Teikoku): written by Shozo Uehara, directed by Takeshi Ogasawara
17. Rushing Through a Sea of Love and Tears: The galactic Tarzan (愛と涙の海を疾走する銀河のターザン, Ai to Namida no Umi o Shissō Suru Ginga no Tāzan): written by Shozo Uehara, directed by Michio Konishi
18. The Unstoppable, Red-Eyed Combat Android (破壊しても立ち上がる赤目の戦闘機械人, Hakai Shite mo Tachiagaru Akame no Sentō Kikai jin): written by Shozo Uehara, directed by Michio Konishi
19. The Cursed Sea-Dweller Laughs: S.O.S. From the Sea of Dolphins (呪いの海底人が笑う イルカの海SOS, Noroi no Kaiteijin ga Warau Iruka no Umi Esu Ō Esu): written by Shozo Uehara, directed by Takeshi Ogasawara
20. My Daughter! My Son! This is Our Last Chance! (娘よ! 息子よ! ラスト・チャンスに賭けろ!, Musume yo! Musuko yo! Rasuto Chansu ni Kakero!): written by Haruya Yamazaki, directed by Takeshi Ogasawara
21. Courage is One Boy Pitching a 160 kph Fastball (熱気球少年が投げる 時速160kmの勇気, Nekkyū Shōnen ga Nageru Jisoku Hyakurokujukirometoru no Yūki): written by Shozo Uehara, directed by Michio Konishi
22. The Girl Becomes a Demon: Sorceress Chikita's Terrible Curse (少女を悪魔にかえる怪女チキタの大妖術, Shōjo o Akuma ni Kaeru Kaijo Chikita no Daiyōjutsu): written by Shozo Uehara, directed by Michio Konishi
23. The Forces of Evil Behind the MegaBeast Show of the Century (魔の手があやつる世紀の巨獣ショー, Ma no Te ga Ayatsuru Seiki no Kyojū Shō): written by Haruya Yamazaki, directed by Makoto Tsuji
24. Beware the Hundred-Million-Yen Salary! (ご用心! 月給1億円さしあげます, Goyōjin! Gekkyū Ichiokuen Sashiagemasu): written by Shozo Uehara, directed by Makoto Tsuji
25. Save Tokyo from Disappearing! Deathmatch of Good vs. Evil (救え東京消失! 悪だま善だまデスマッチ, Sukue Tōkyō Shoshitsu! Akudama Zendama Desumacchi): written by Shozo Uehara, directed by Takeshi Ogasawara
26. The Land Roars! Daileon's Furious Counterattack (とどろく大地! ダイレオン怒りの大逆襲, Todoroku Daichi! Daireon Ikari no Dai Gyakushū): written by Shozo Uehara, directed by Takeshi Ogasawara
27. Sprint Down the Singing, Swinging Road of Youth! (歌って踊って青春ロードを突っ走れ!, Utatte Odotte Seishun Rōdo o Tsuppashire!): written by Shozo Uehara, directed by Michio Konishi
28. The Cyber-Beast's Deadly Data (電子頭脳獣の必殺データー, Denshi Zunōjū no Hissatsu Dētā): written by Shozo Uehara, directed by Michio Konishi
29. The Death of Madgallant! But Wait, Gilza is... (マッドギャラン死す! しかしギルザが..., Maddogyaran Shisu! Shikashi Giruza ga...): written by Shozo Uehara, directed by Takeshi Ogasawara
30. Red Balloon, Blue Balloon: Balloon Panic (赤い風船・青い風船・バルーンパニック, Akai Fūsen, Aoi Fūsen: Barūn Panikku): written by Shozo Uehara, directed by Takeshi Ogasawara
31. Help Me, Mom! The Live Broadcast of Terror (お母さん助けて! 恐怖の生中継, Okāsan Tasukete! Kyōfu no Nama Chūkei): written by Shozo Uehara, directed by Michio Konishi
32. The Helper Robots' Night Job (お手伝いロボットの真夜中のアルバイト, Otetsudai Robotto no Mayonaka no Arubaito): written by Shozo Uehara, directed by Michio Konishi
33. Even the Bullied Kids Dance: The Great Magical Battle (いじめっ子も踊りだす魔法大合戦, Ijimekko mo Odoridasu Mahō Dai Gassen): written by Shozo Uehara, directed by Takeshi Ogasawara
34. Break Through the Iron Fortress! The Love Between Father and Son (鉄壁の要塞を砕く父と子の愛, Teppeki no Yōsai o Kudaku Chichi to Ko no Ai): written by Shozo Uehara, directed by Takeshi Ogasawara
35. The Bible is Found! Now, for a Frightening Truth... (発見された聖書(バイブル)今恐るべき事実が..., Hakken Sareta Baiburu Ima Osorubeki Jijitsu ga...): written by Shozo Uehara, directed by Makoto Tsuji
36. The Radiance of a New Life that Summons Forth a Miracle (奇蹟を呼ぶ新しい生命の輝き, Kiseki o Yobu Atarashii Inochi no Kagayaki): written by Shozo Uehara, directed by Makoto Tsuji
37. The Full Course of Fear! Would You Care for an Infernal Cuisine? (恐怖のフルコース地獄料理はいかが?, Kyōfu no Furu Kōsu Jigoku Ryōri wa Ikaga?): written by Haruya Yamazaki, directed by Michio Konishi
38. My Sister is Acting Weird! The Strange Pin Plan (姉ちゃんが変だ! ワッペン作戦の怪奇, Nē-chan ga Hen Da! Wappen Sakusen no Kaiki): written by Shozo Uehara, directed by Michio Konishi
39. Mio's Kiss Has One Million Horsepower (ミヨちゃんのキッスは百万馬力, Miyo-chan no Kissu wa Hyakuman Bariki): written by Shozo Uehara, directed by Shohei Tojo
40. The Rich Man Plan! Mystery of the Diamond Meteor Shower (リッチマン作戦・ダイヤ流星群の謎, Ricchi Man Sakusen: Daiya Ryūseigun no Nazo): written by Shozo Uehara, directed by Shohei Tojo
41. Time to Duel: The Justice of the Deadeye Gunman You Summoned (決闘の時・君が呼ぶ必殺ガンマンの正義, Kettō no Toki: Kimi ga Yobu Hissatsu Ganman no Seigi): written by Haruya Yamazaki, directed by Takeshi Ogasawara
42. Friends from the Stars: Pippi and Hiroshi's Story (星から来た友だち・ピッピと浩の物語, Hoshi kara Kita Tomodachi: Pippi to Hiroshi no Monogatari): written by Shozo Uehara, directed by Takeshi Ogasawara
43. Alice saw Satan Goth's Wonderland (アリスが見た不思議の国のサタンゴース, Arisu ga Mita Fushigi no Kuni no Satan Gōsu): written by Shozo Uehara, directed by Shohei Tojo
44. You Survived? The Ancient Haunt Emerges (君は生き残れるか? 出現した太古の魔境, Kimi wa Ikinokoreru ka? Shutsugen-shita Taiko no Makyo): written by Shozo Uehara, directed by Shohei Tojo
45. I Am the Son of Satan Goth (おれはサタンゴースの息子だ, Ore wa Satan Gōsu no Musuko Da): written by Shozo Uehara, directed by Takeshi Ogasawara
46. Humanity All Across the Galaxy Joins Hands (手をつなぐ全銀河の人類たち, Te o Tsunagu Zenginga no Jinrui-tachi): written by Shozo Uehara, directed by Takeshi Ogasawara

== Cast ==
- Juspion
  Hikaru Kurosaki
- Anri
  Kiyomi Tsukada
- Miya
  Atsuko Koganezawa
- Edjinn
  Noboru Nakaya
- Boomerang
  Hiroshi Watari
- Kenichirou Nanbara
  Isao Sasaki
- Kanoko Nanbara
  Kiyomi Sone
- Kenta Nanbara
  Daisuke Yamashita
- Kumiko
  Miki Takahashi
- Lott
  Hiroshi Satō
- Sachi
  Yoshie Hayashi
- Madgallant
  Jyunichi Haruta
- Brima
  Misa Nirei
- Gyol
  Kei Anan
- Zampa
  Daigaku Sekine
- Ikki
  Toshimichi Takahashi
- Gasami the Elder
  Eiichi Kikuchi
- Gasami the Younger
  Shun Ueda
- Gilza
  Atsuko Takahata
- Gilmaza
  Yukie Kagawa

=== Voice cast ===
- Satan Goth
  Shōzō Iizuka
- Narrator
  Tōru Ōhira

== Songs ==
Opening theme

- "I am Justice! Juspion" (俺が正義だ！ジャスピオン, Ore ga Seigi da! Jasupion)
  - Lyrics
    Keisuke Yamakawa
  - Composition and Arrangement
    Michiaki Watanabe
  - Artist
    Ai Takano (アイ高野)

Ending theme

- "Space Wolf Juspion" (銀河狼(スペースウルフ)ジャスピオン, Supēsu Urufu Jasupion)
  - Lyrics
    Keisuke Yamakawa
  - Composition and Arrangement
    Michiaki Watanabe
  - Artist
    Ai Takano

== Broadcasts, Home Video & Streaming ==
- In its home country of Japan, the series originally aired on TV Asahi and other ANN affiliates starting on March 15, 1985. The first 34 episodes aired on Friday evenings at 7:30PM JST until December 27 of that year. The last 12 episodes then aired on Monday evenings at 7:00PM JST starting on January 5, 1986 until it concluded on March 24, of that year. Then later, the series got released on VHS by Toei Video (for both for sale and rental) between November 1990 and January 1992. Only six volumes were released as each volume contains three episodes, with episodes 1 through 18. They had the episodes listed in English, below the title, "Space Wolf Juspion" (named after the ending theme for instance). This has created some confusion and has led some to believe that is the actual title of the series and translation of "Kyojuu Tokusou." The Space Wolf name is simply one of Juspion's nicknames much like the "Galactic Tarzan" in order for him to have a title to introduce himself by. Also, immediately after the show ended, a compilation video was released entitled "I am Justice! Kyoju Tokusou Jaspion Video Special", which included some newly filmed scenes. Due to a policy change Toei made where they would only release full home videos of their most recent works, they stopped releasing episodes on VHS there. It would be given a DVD release in 2003 between May 21 and November 21, where the full series would be released for the first time. There are four volumes in total, each containing 2 discs and 12 episodes each, while volumes 2 and 4 contain only 11 episodes. The newly filmed scenes taken from the compilation video is included as a bonus feature on the Volume 4 DVD.
- In Thailand, the series was broadcast on three different channels over the years there. It first aired on Channel 5 in 1985. Then it aired a second time on Channel 7 from 1987 to 1988 and aired every Sunday at 10:00AM. Then in 2000, it aired with a new Thai dub on MCOT handled mainly by Nirun Boonyarattaphan and his team and was shown under Space Fox Juspion (จิ้งจอกอวกาศจัสเปี้ยน). Video Square also distributed this Thai dub onto home video.
- In France, the series aired as Jaspion with a French dub licensed and produced by AB Groupe with the dubbing work by Studio SOFRECI. It aired on the Club Dorothée block on TF1 on August 31, 1988. When it originally aired, only the first twenty episodes were broadcast mainly because it was competing against its successor being Jikuu Senshi Spielban (aired as Spielvan there). Because it was also being shown around the same time and on the same channel, it caused the series to suffer. But later on, the other episodes would eventually air in due time after. It also received a VHS release in the late 1980s part of the Club Dorothée Collection by Dagobert Video.
- In 2007, it was aired on Indosiar as Indonesian Language.
- In South Korea, Daeyoung Panda acquired the rights to sell VHS tapes of the series with a Korean dub and was first available on April 20, 1999 under Invincible Jaspion (거수특수 저스피온).
- During Otakon 2018, Discotek Media announced that they had licensed the show for a one-disc SD on BD release in North America. The SD Blu-ray was released on August 27, 2019. And in 2021, the complete series was streaming on Crunchyroll, making the first tokusatsu from Toei to be streaming on the service. Episodes of the show has since been added to YouTube's Toei Tokusatsu World Official channel as well.

=== Popularity in Brazil ===
The series has had a huge popularity in Brazil for decades. Toshihiko Egawara, founder of Everest Video, licensed the series for home video at the time, with LPs for Top Tape. He bought the series over to the region under the name "O Fantástico Jaspion" (The Fantastic Jaspion) and it was readily available on VHS throughout Mid-1987 with all 46 episodes dubbed in Brazilian Portuguese (produced between 1986-1987) and sold throughout several volumes. Once it was proven to be a big success through that market, it then made its full big premiere on Prime Time in the region on the now-defunct Rede Manchete on February 22, 1988, with all episodes aired in due time. This was after several television networks had turned down to air the series. It premiered in Brazil on the same day as another Toei Tokusatsu series Dengeki Sentai Changeman which aired as Esquadrão Relâmpago Changeman (Lightning Squadron Changeman) on the same channel. This series was a huge hit and has enjoyed unprecedented success in that country. It was the first Metal Heroes series and the very first Tokusatsu series to be made in the 1980s to ever air in the region at a time when mostly re-runs of 1960s and 1970s tokusatsu programs were airing. Not only did more Metal Heroes series get shown, but also other tokusatsu and even anime television series later eventually aired on TV in Brazil. Years later, Focus Filmes gave the series a full DVD release with all episodes included with both the original Japanese audio with Brazilian Portuguese subtitles and the Brazilian Portuguese dub included. The series' successor Jikuu Senshi Spielban which has no connection to this series, was localized in the region under Jaspion 2: Spielvan. However, the main hero was still called Spielvan in the Brazilian Portuguese dub.

In February 2018, it was announced that Juspion would get a remake movie produced by Brazilian company Sato Company, with Toei's endorsement and approval. The movie's cast was expected to be announced in 2019, with the film set initially to be released in the early 2020s. And then in 2020, the Brazilian publisher JBC launched a comic book in manga-style titled O Regresso de Jaspion (The Return of Jaspion), with the approval of Toei. The story follows the end of the TV show.

A representative at Toei speculated about the popularity “I think that the Brazilians, who have an easy-going national character, were curious about the clear and futuristic drama and accepted it.”
