= Choudenshi Bioman =

1984 Japanese television series

- Original Japanese title card
- Genre: Tokusatsu; Superhero fiction Science fiction Fantasy
- Created by: Toei Company
- Developed by: Hirohisa Soda
- Directed by: Nagafumi Hori
- Starring: Ryōsuke Sakamoto; Naoto Ōta; Akito Ōsuga; Yuki Yajima; Sumiko Tanaka; Michiko Makino; Hikaru Kurosaki; Munemaru Kōda; Hirohisa Nakata; Yōko Asuka; Yukari Oshima; Strong Kongo
- Narrated by: Ichirō Murakoshi
- Composer: Tatsumi Yano
- Country of origin: Japan
- No. of episodes: 51

Production
- Producers: Moriyoshi Katō (TV Asahi); Seiji Abe (Toei); Takeyuki Suzuki (Toei); Yasuhiro Tomita (Toei Agency)
- Running time: 20 minutes
- Production companies: TV Asahi; Toei Company; Toei Agency

Original release
- Network: ANN (TV Asahi)
- Release: February 4, 1984 – January 19, 1985

Related
- Kagaku Sentai Dynaman; Dengeki Sentai Changeman

Choudenshi Bioman (Japanese: 超電子バイオマン, Hepburn: Chōdenshi Baioman; Super Electron Bioman) is a Japanese television tokusatsu series broadcast by TV Asahi. The series is the eighth installment of Super Sentai. Directed by Nagafumi Hori, it stars Ryōsuke Sakamoto, Naoto Ōta, Akito Ōsuga, Yuki Yajima, Sumiko Tanaka, Michiko Makino, Hikaru Kurosaki, Munemaru Kōda, Hirohisa Nakata, Yōko Asuka, Yukari Oshima and Strong Kongo. It aired from February 4, 1984 to January 19, 1985, replacing Kagaku Sentai Dynaman and was replaced by Dengeki Sentai Changeman. The international English title is listed by Toei as Bioman.

== Synopsis ==
The once prosperous Planet Bio (バイオ星, Baio-sei) is destroyed after a world war erupted over the use of a scientific discovery called "Bio Particles". The Planet Bio Peacekeeping Alliance (バイオ星平和連合, Baio-sei Heiwa Rengō), which sought to use Bio Particles for peaceful purposes, sends the giant robot Bio Robo and an assistant robot named Peebo to prevent the same tragedy from happening on Earth. Bio Robo arrives in 15th century Japan, where it showers Bio Particles on five young individuals. Five centuries later, the descendants of these individuals, infused with Bio Particles, are chosen by Peebo and Bio Robo to become the Bioman team to protect the Earth from the Neo-Empire Gear, an organization led by mad scientist Doctor Man.

== Characters ==
=== Bioman ===
The complete Bioman team transformed, alongside their ally Peebo; from left to right: Blue Three, Pink Five, Red One, Peebo, Yellow Four and Green Two.

The eponymous Bioman team are the descendants of five people showered with Bio Particles centuries ago who was spirited away by the Bio Robo during Gear's initial attack to obtain the Techno Braces (テクノブレス, Tekuno Buresu) from Peebo to become the Bioman. To transform individually they call their color and number, and to transform as a group they call "Bioman". Along with their Bio Swords (バイオソード, Baio Sōdo), a versatile sidearm with sword, dagger, and blaster modes, the Bioman have a variety of team attacks that are executed after their Bio Brain Computers are synched up. Among their team attacks are the Bio Electron Beam (バイオエレクトロビーム, Baio Erekutoron Bīmu) and Miracle Laser (ミラクルレーザー, Mirakuru Rēzā).

- Shirō Gō/Red One (郷史朗/レッドワン, Gō Shirō/Reddo Wan): Shirō Gō is the pilot of the first Japanese space shuttle before getting caught in the crossfire just as the Gear begins their invasion. In him, passion and responsibility unite. He grew up believing that his father was dead. However, after meeting Professor Shibata, he is not so sure. The Bio Particles within him enable him to communicate with animals; thus making them useful in reconnaissance missions. His Bio Brain Computer allows him to target any opponent with his Super Electron Radar (超電子レーダー, Chōdenshi Rēdā) ability. He wields the Fire Sword (ファイヤーソード, Faiyā Sōdo) and his special attack is the Spark Sword (スパークソード, Supāku Sōdo).
- Shingo Takasugi/Green Two (高杉真吾/グリーンツー, Takasugi Shingo/Gurīn Tsū): Shingo Takasugi is a race car driver. Shingo can be very tough to enemies yet very kind to children. Despite his bravado, there are times when he doubts his abilities. Despite these doubts, he knows what he must do and does his best. He is the designated driver of Bio Turbo. His Bio Brain Computer allows him to use his Super Electron Scope (超電子スコープ, Chōdenshi Sukōpu) ability to see through any deception. He wields the Hurricane Sword (ハリケーンソード, Harikēn Sōdo) and the Green Boomerang (グリーンブメラング, Gurīn Bumerangu), and his special attack is Break Action (ブレイクアクション, Bureiku Akushon).
- Ryūta Nanbara/Blue Three (南原竜太/ブルースリー, Nanbara Ryūta/Burū Surī): Ryūta Nanbara is a water sportsman who is boyish and adventurous. He loves to explore and discover new things. His years of diving have made him very nimble and is skilled in stealth techniques. He can't tolerate bullies considering he used to be one. His Bio Brain Computer allows him to use his Super Electron Ear (超電子イヤー, Chōdenshi Iyā) ability to enhance his sense of hearing. He wields the Elec-Sword (エレキソード, Ereki Sōdo) and his special attack is Super Sky Diving (スーパースカイダイビング, Sūpā Sukai Daibingu).
- Yellow Four (イエローフォー, Ierō Fō): The fourth member of the Bioman team whose moniker was utilized by its original user and her successor.
  - Mika Koizumi (小泉ミカ, Koizumi Mika; 1–10): Mika Koizumi was a photographer who dreams of following in her late brother's footsteps to photograph African wildlife. Initially, she is hesitant to join the team until she is convinced that Gear's evil would eventually put the animals in danger. When Gear manage to gather a bit of Anti-Bio Particles to weaponize, Mika dies by Psygorn's hand sacrificing herself to empty the Bio Killer Gun's ammo so her allies can fight without being poisoned by the Anti-Bio Particles. The others mourn her as Bio Robo activates her Bio-Brain Computer to present her memories to give the Bioman hope. Her Bio Brain Computer allows her to present photographic projections in her Super Electron Holography (超電子ホログラフィ, Chōdenshi Horogurafi) ability. She wielded the Thunder Sword (サンダーソード, Sandā Sōdo) and her special attack was Strobe Flash.
  - Jun Yabuki (矢吹ジュン, Yabuki Jun; 11–51): Jun Yabuki is an Olympic archer. Sometimes dressing up in a hybrid American Indian cowgirl/feudal Japan outfit. The last two letters in her surname "ki" form the kanji for her color. After watching Bioman in action, she tries to join them, but is initially refused due to her lack of understanding how serious the fight is. However, her fearlessness enabled the Bioman to learn that she is also a descendant of the original Bioman. When she accidentally injures Shirō during the Samecanth incident, Jun is confronted by her old squad captain who learns of her reasons for leaving the Olympic archery team and allows her to remain with the Bioman. In addition to having the same abilities and arsenal as her predecessor, Jun also wields the Bio Arrow (バイオアロー, Baio Arō) bow.
- Hikaru Katsuragi/Pink Five (桂木ひかる/ピンクファイブ, Katsuragi Hikaru/Pinku Faibu): Hikaru Katsuragi is a carnival flutist. She is sweet yet strong and is a mistress of disguise. She bears an unusually strong spirit with a strong motherly instinct. She plays the flute to calm her spirits and to strengthen her resolve. She is able to befriend the evil computer Brain and teach him about friendship, which pays off when Brain sacrifices himself to save the Bioman and the world from destruction. She is the most emotional member of the team. Her Bio Brain Computer allows her to use her Super Electron Beamlight (超電子ビームライト, Chōdenshi Bīmuraito) ability. She wields the Laser Sword (レーザーソード, Rēzā Sōdo) and her special attacks are Pink Flash (ピンクフラッシュ, Pinku Furasshu), Pink Barrier (ピンクバリヤー, Pinku Bariyā), and Spin Chop (スピンチョップ, Supin Choppu).

==== Allies ====
- Peebo (ピーボ, Pībo): An android who is the guardian of the Bio Particles, the Bio Robo and the Bio Dragon, built as an experimental robot when the Bio Particles were in development. He came to Earth 500 years ago and showered five courageous people with Bio Particles. Now that Gear has made its move, Peebo and the Bio Robo gather the descendants of the original five. He shows a great fear for Silva. In the last two episodes, he used himself to energize the Bio Robo.
- Shūichi Kageyama (蔭山 秀一, Kageyama Shūichi): Thinking himself an orphan, named Kōichi Nakamura (中村 公一, Nakamura Kōichi), he learns he is in reality Shūichi Kageyama, the son of Doctor Man and basis of the design of Prince. At first, Doctor Man tries to get him to join Gear, but Shūichi rejects his father. Eventually, Shūichi finds and joins Doctor Shibata. Later, he helps the Bioman ultimately defeat Gear. He manages to convince Doctor Man to help them stop the bomb that could destroy the whole Earth through the use of human emotions.
- Setsuko Kageyama (蔭山 節子, Kageyama Setsuko): The former wife of Doctor Kageyama and the mother of Shūichi. After Kageyama became Doctor Man, she left her husband and gave away their son Shūichi for adoption by the Nakamura family. 17 years later, the Bioman team and Shūichi stumble onto a letter she left behind, along with a video recording, which revealed Doctor Man's true identity. She never actually appears in the series besides a photograph of herself with Kageyama and Shūichi as an infant, and a voice-over while Shūichi reads her letter.
- Shin-ichirō Gō (郷 紳一朗, Gō Shin'ichirō): The estranged father of Shiro and the former research partner of Hideo Kageyama. After Kageyama became insane, he faked his death and left his wife and son to stop his former friend. He turned himself into a cyborg like Doctor Man did to continue his research and overthrow the Neo-Empire Gear. Adopting the alias of Professor Shibata (柴田博士, Shibata-hakase), he disguises his true identity by wearing rose-colored eyeglasses and a fake beard. He creates a "conscience circuit" that is capable of giving Mecha Clones free will.
- Joy (ジョーイ, Jōi): A young friend of Peebo from Planet Bio. He recorded a video message on a compact disc addressed to Peebo that was sent to Earth from Bio Star before its destruction. Doctor Man managed to get a hold of the disc before Peebo does and decides to create a Mecha Clone of Joy in order to trick Peebo into revealing the location of the headquarters of the Biomen. Peebo is deceived by the duplicate at first, but manages to see through the deception after he views the video recording of Joy, which revealed that the real Joy was unable to escape the destruction of the Planet Bio and that he recorded the video as his final farewell to Peebo. Doctor Man, who did not understand the language of the people of Planet Bio, did not realize that Joy was already dead.
- Ken Hayase (早瀬 健, Hayase Ken): The former coach of Jun and the captain of the Japanese Olympic Archery Team. He tries to investigate Jun's sudden departure from the team in order to convince her to return, only to discover Jun's secret identity as Yellow Four and allows her to remain with the Bioman.
- Shota Yamamori (山守 正太, Yamamori Shōta): A protector of nature who lives in Mount Nekura by himself. When the Bioman team first encounter Yamamori, Shiro ponders the possibility of whether Yamamori might carry Bio Particles within him. After falling in love with Jun, Yamamori tries to join the team desperately, but is ultimately rejected when Bio Robo finds no traces of Bio Particles within his body. Disillusioned, Yamamori is tricked by a disguised Farrah into undergoing a procedure that would transform him into the Magne Warrior (マグネ戦士, Magune Senshi), which puts him under the control of Gear. However, Yamamori manages to break free of Gear's influence and helps the Bioman team destroy the Magne Megas. Yamamori is considered a prototype of the "sixth ranger" additions featured in later Super Sentai shows.
- Miki (ミキ): A special Mecha Clone developed by Doctor Man to be coupled with Satan Megas in episodes 43 and 44, Miki had the unusual appearance of a young girl in school uniform. As long as she existed, Satan Megas was able to re-assemble himself indefinitely, making him virtually invincible. After being implanted with the conscience circuit of Professor Shibata, however, Miki felt guilt for the ravages caused by Gear, and self-destructed so Bio Robo could defeat Satan Megas.

=== Neo-Empire Gear ===
The Neo-Empire Gear (新帝国ギア, Shin Teikoku Gia) was founded and led by the cyborg Doctor Man, from his Neo-Cloud fortress at the South Pole. Gear's forces believe themselves to be a technologically advanced society with the right to rule Earth.

- Doctor Man (ドクターマン, Dokutā Man): The supreme ruler of Neo-Empire Gear, Doctor Man was actually a human named Doctor Hideo Kageyama (蔭山 秀夫, Kageyama Hideo) who experimented on himself to accelerate his intelligence, only to have his body rapidly age in the process. To extend his life, Kageyama converted himself into a cyborg with a deep disgust for humanity, planning to conquer the world with his army of Mecha Clones while remaining alive long enough to find a worthy heir to his empire. When his true origins are revealed, Doctor Man countered the coup with a Mecha Clone copy of himself and later reprogrammed the Big Three and reorganized the empire. With his empire dying, he goes and fights the Bioman with King Megas only to be defeated. He activated the Anti-Bio Bomb, but he ended up stopping it when his son and the Bioman prodded him eventually resulting in his death.
- Prince (プリンス, Purinsu): He first appeared to Mason in the test mission to steal some gas, calling himself the son of Doctor Man where he blew up the power plant. As he was introduced as the son of Doctor Man, Doctor Man was revealed to be a human being. Ryuta wanted to stop him for his own well-being since he was only 17 years old. It was also revealed that the tentacles used to steal fuel were part of his creation Grotes Canth. Later on, it was revealed that he was just a Mecha Clone created in Doctor Man's missing son's image of Shuichi after Mason and Farrah were tasked to return him to base. Because of that, Doctor Man reprogrammed him to be just Battle Mecha Prince where he challenged the Biomen for the final time. Ryuta accepted he could not be helped and the Biomen defeated him when his robot Grotesque Kans was destroyed.
- The Big Three: Three android generals who supervise mission and can disguise themselves as humans.
  - Mason (メイスン, Meisun): The leader of the Big Three and the first of the trio to battle the Bioman, the frequent rival of Red One. Given the Bio Killer Gun, Mason only managed to kill Mika (the first Yellow Four) when she intentionally had him empty out all his Anti-Bio Particle ammo on her while he wanted to kill Shiro. He once plotted against Doctor Man himself upon learning his origins. He wields a staff that fires energy bolts which was later broken in half by Red One. He later fired an energy bolt to Red One from his chest after his staff was broken. Doctor Man apparently puts more importance on him than the other two. He later shares a close relationship with Farrah. He was later rebuilt to wield Mason Rockets and Mason Machine Gun. He was eventually killed by Silva, praising Doctor Man one final time before he explodes.
  - Fara (ファラ, Fara): The female member of the Big Three, she uses beam weapons and leaves the dirty fighting to Faracat. She often disguises herself as human in her schemes, favoring cunning and deception above brutal force. She used to show resentment towards Mason but later developed a close relationship with him starting with the plot to steal gold bars which Mason designed. She was later rebuilt to be equipped with Farrah Fire Storm and Farrah Kiss (blows an explosive flying kiss). She is rivals with Yellow Four and Pink Five. She died after receiving damage in battle while piloting Balzion.
  - Monster (モンスター, Monsutā): The brute of the Big Three who uses a battle axe as his usual weapon of choice, though he can use nearby heavy objects in his fights as well. He usually works with Zyuoh. He was later upgraded to wield the Black Mace and Iron Paw. Despite being an android, he is revealed to have feelings for Farrah which she resents and Mason considers it disgusting. He was killed while trying to capture Balzion in Super Megas.
- Faracat (ファラキャット, Fara Kyatto): Farrah's android bodyguard who does the dirty work, dressed in black and purple skins, she is quick, agile and acrobatic. She has claws for weapons and uses twin nunchukus as well. She eventually meets her end when Yellow Four and Pink Five blew off her circuits with a full blast.
- Mechaclones (メカクローン, Mekakurōn): The robotic foot soldiers of Gear. They have black bodies with red eyes, and silver masks that hide their mechanical faces. Their arms include swords and guns. Mechaclones can be programmed to pilot Mechadrone jet fighters or act as laboratory assistants. They can also disguise themselves as humans and are equipped with explosives for suicide missions.

==== Five Beast Warrior Jyunoids ====
The Five Beast Warrior Jyunoids (ジューノイド五獣士, Jūnoido Go Jūshi) are mechanical monsters that fight the Biomen and support the Big Three in their battles.

- Psygorn (サイゴーン, Saigōn): A psychic monster with three Asura-like faces with the ability to spew fire and uses telekinesis and teleportation, normally working with Mason and Farrah. He is the mightiest of the Jyunoids as he caused serious problems to the Biomen in battle, playing a role in Mika's death. Psygorn was later upgraded with energy beams and stronger fire powers. He is the last Jyunoid to be killed and was destroyed by heavy damage caused by Red One and the Biomen, while trying to protect Mason of which he could be heard telling the latter to get away.
- Mettzler (メッツラー, Mettsurā): A biomechanical cycloptic Jyunoid whose head is in a glass dome. He wields a rapier and clawed arm, and is able to create holograms and turn himself into a slime to evade attacks or sneak attack his opponent. Mettzler usually works with Farrah, later upgraded with her to be able to stretch his limbs at the same time Farrah was upgraded. He was destroyed after an overdose of Bio Killer Energy from Silva and receiving the Bio Electron Charge attack while trying to shield Farrah.
- Jyuoh (ジュウオウ, Jūō): A gorilla-themed robot that generally works alongside Monster, being a dim-witted brute who wields a mace and able to use his finger cannons in battle. As a result, Jyuoh is loyal to Monster to the point of coming to the aid of his master. After being heavily damaged in battle, Jyuoh was rebuilt for his loyalty at the request of his master with chest cannons. He works as the acting leader in the movie. He was destroyed after receiving heavy damage from Silva and the Biomen.
- Messarju (メッサージュウ, Messājū): A falcon-faced gargoyle-themed robot with the ability to fly and fire supersonic waves and laser energy beams. He usually supports Farrah and Mason, although at one point worked with Monster. Messarjū was the first of the Jyunoids to be destroyed.
- Aquaiger (アクアイガー, Akuaigā): A Gill-man/piranha-themed robot who wields a harpoon-gun and built-in Bubble Bombs and Acid Spray. Usually working with Farrah and Mason, Aquaiger is the weakest of the Beastnoids to the point of getting beat down by the other Jyunoids. He was one of the first Jyunoids to be destroyed fighting the Biomen.

==== Mecha-Gigans ====
The Mecha-Gigans (メカジャイガン, Meka Jaigan) are giant robots that are dispatched to fight Bio Robo. All of the Mecha-Gigans have their names ending in the word "Canth".

- Kabuto Canth (カブトカンス, Kabutokansu): A horseshoe crab-themed Mecha-Gigan.
- Devil Canth (デビルカンス, Debiru Kansu): A devil-horned Mecha-Gigan.
- Gorilla Canth (ゴリラカンス, Gorirakansu): A gorilla-themed Mecha-Gigan.
- Beetle Canth (ビートルカンス, Bītorukansu): A rhinoceros beetle-themed Mecha-Gigan.
- Mummy Canth (ミイラカンス, Mīrakansu): A mummy-themed Mecha-Gigan whose special bandages grant it invisibility.
- Rhino Canth (サイカンス, Sai Kansu): A burrowing rhinoceros-themed Mecha-Gigan.
- Sea Anemone Canth (イソギンカンス, Isogin Kansu): A sea anemone-themed Mecha-Gigan.
- Twin Canth (ツインカンス, Tsuinkansu): A two-headed dragon-themed Mecha-Gigan.
- Chameleon Canth (カメレオンカンス, Kamereonkansu): A chameleon-themed Mecha-Gigan.
- Samurai Canth (ムシャカンス, Mushakansu): A Sōhei-themed Mecha-Gigan.
- Hammer Canth (ハンマーカンス, Hanmākansu): A baoding balls-headed Mecha-Gigan.
- Shark Canth (サメカンス, Samekansu): A shark-themed Mecha-Gigan.
- Anchor Canth (アンカーカンス, Ankākansu): A fish/battleship-themed Mecha-Gigan with an anchor for a right hand.
- Frog Canth (カエルカンス, Kaeru Kansu): A frog-themed Mecha-Gigan.
- Neptune Canth (ネプチューンカンス, Nepuchūnkansu): A Neptune-themed Mecha-Gigan who wields a trident.
- Turtle Canth (カメカンス, Kamekansu): A sea turtle-themed Mecha-Gigan.
- Haniwa Canth (ハニワカンス, Haniwakansu): A Haniwa-themed Mecha-Gigan.
- Grotes Canth (グロテスカンス, Gurotesukansu): An internal organs/muscle-themed Mecha-Gigan developed by Prince.
- Camera Canth (カメラカンス, Kamera Kansu): A camera-themed Mecha-Gigan.
- Scarab Canth (スカラベカンス, Sukarabekansu): A scarab beetle-themed Mecha-Gigan.
- Piranha Canth (ピラニアカンス, Piraniakansu): A piranha-themed Mecha-Gigan.
- Poison Moth Canth (ドクガカンス, Dokugakansu): A moth-themed Mecha-Gigan.
- Ghost Canth (ゴーストカンス, Gōsutokansu): A Mephistopheles/ghost-themed Mecha-Gigan whose projector can produce ghostly images.
- Spider Canth (クモカンス, Kumokansu): A spider-themed Mecha-Gigan.
- Octopus Canth (タコカンス, Tako Kansu): An octopus-themed Mecha-Gigan created by Doctor Man.
- Jellyfish Canth (クラゲカンス, Kuragekansu): A jellyfish-themed Mecha-Gigan where it is actually two bodies consisting of its jellyfish-like head that can float and its main body.
- Mantis Canth (カマキリカンス, Kamakirikansu): A mantis-themed Mecha-Gigan created by Doctor Man.
- Crab Canth (カニカンス, Kanikansu): A crab-themed Mecha-Gigan that appears in Choudenshi Bioman: The Movie.

===== Neo Mecha-Gigans =====
The Neo Mecha-Gigans (ネオメカジャイガン, Neo Meka Jaigan) are giant robots that are often piloted by the Big Three and have their names ending in the word "Megas". They are much stronger than the Mecha-Gigans. Each Neo Mecha-Gigan has an Emergency Mirage Fighter Escape Jet for the pilot to escape in if the Neo Mecha-Gigan is about to be destroyed.

- Metal Megas (メタルメガス, Metarumegasu): A Gort-themed Neo Mecha-Gigan piloted by Mason.
- Axe Megas (アックスメガス, Akkusumegasu): A Neo Mecha-Gigan with an axe for a right hand and a knife for a left hand that was piloted by Mason.
- Skull Megas (ドクロメガス, Dokuromegasu): A skeleton-themed Neo Mecha-Gigan piloted by Fara.
- Wrestler Megas (レスラーメガス, Resurāmegasu): A wrestler-themed Neo Mecha-Gigan piloted by Monster.
- Magne Megas (マグネメガス, Magunemegasu): A magnet-themed Neo Mecha-Gigan created from Magne Meteors. It was first piloted by Mason and then piloted by Fara.
- Cannon Megas (カノンメガス, Kanonmegasu): A cannon-themed Neo Mecha-Gigan stolen by Bio Hunter Silva and later piloted by Mason.
- Battle Megas (バトルメガス, Batorumegasu): A Neo Mecha-Gigan with torso cannons, a blade for a right hand, a shielded left arm, and missile launchers on both shoulders that was piloted by Fara.
- Sonic Megas (ソニックメガス, Sonikkumegasu): A loudspeaker-themed Neo Mecha-Gigan piloted by Bio Hunter Silva.
- Crush Megas (クラッシュメガス, Kurasshumegasu): A Neo Mecha-Gigan with hooks for hands, a second pair of arms that can launch maces, and an energy cannon on its back that was piloted by Monster.
- Amazon Megas (アマゾンメガス, Amazonmegasu): An Amazon warrior-themed Neo Mecha-Gigan piloted by Fara.
- Thunder Megas (サンダーメガス, Sandāmegasu): An electrode-theme Neo Mecha-Gigan piloted by Monster.
- Satan Megas (サタンメガス, Satan Megasu): A Satan-themed Neo Mecha-Gigan piloted by Mason.
- Baroque Megas (バロックメガス, Barokkumegasu): A mask-themed Neo Mecha-Gigan piloted by Fara. Each of its masks possesses a different power.
- Rugger Megas (ラガーメガス, Ragāmegasu): A football player-themed Neo Mecha-Gigan piloted by Monster.
- Lens Megas (レンズメガス, Renzumegasu): A lens-themed Neo Mecha-Gigan piloted by Mason.
- Super Megas (スーパーメガス, Sūpāmegasu): A Neo Mecha-Gigan with superior power that was piloted by Monster.
- King Megas (キングメガス, Kingumegasu): A Neo Mecha-Gigan piloted by Doctor Man.

=== Bio Hunter Silva ===
Bio Hunter Silva (バイオハンター・シルバ, Baio Hantā Shiruba; Silver in the Philippines dub) is a robot who was given the Anti-Bio Particles as a power source and a built-in arrow launcher in his elbow from Planet Bio built by the Anti-Bio Union (反バイオ同盟, Han Baio Dōmei) with the objective to terminate anything with Bio Particles. However, Silva malfunctions and uses his mecha Balzion (バルジオン, Barujion) to destroy Planet Bio. Tracking the Bio Particle signature of Peebo and the Bio Robo, Silva arrives on Earth to complete his objective. Though an arch-enemy of the Bioman, Silva is also at odds with Gear who desire to utilize Balzion's technology for their own use where he used some of the Neo Mecha-Gigas. Losing his robot, Silva retrieves Balzion while killing Mason. In the end, Silva is destroyed when Balzion was defeated by a sudden charge of Bio Energy from the Bio Robo.

== Episodes ==
| No. | Title | Original release date |
|---|---|---|
| 1 | "The Enigmatic Giant Robo Arrives"; Transliteration: "Nazo no Kyodai Robo Shutsugen" (Japanese: 謎の巨大ロボ出現) | February 4, 1984 |
| 2 | "Gathering! Warriors of Destiny"; Transliteration: "Shūgō! Shukumei no Senshi" (Japanese: 集合！宿命の戦士) | February 11, 1984 |
| 3 | "Our Friend, Bio Robo"; Transliteration: "Waga Tomo Baio Robo" (Japanese: わが友バイオロボ) | February 18, 1984 |
| 4 | "Self Destruct! Mecha-Humans"; Transliteration: "Jibaku! Meka Ningen" (Japanese: 自爆！メカ人間) | February 25, 1984 |
| 5 | "Kill the Unseen Enemy"; Transliteration: "Mienai Teki o Kire" (Japanese: 見えない敵を斬れ) | March 3, 1984 |
| 6 | "Rise Up! Bio Robo"; Transliteration: "Tate! Baio Robo" (Japanese: 起て！バイオロボ) | March 10, 1984 |
| 7 | "Captured Peebo"; Transliteration: "Tsukamatta Pibo" (Japanese: つかまったピーボ) | March 17, 1984 |
| 8 | "Fight! Vow to the Planet"; Transliteration: "Tatakae! Hoshi ni Sakatte" (Japanese: 戦え！星に誓って) | March 24, 1984 |
| 9 | "The Jumprope That Erases People"; Transliteration: "Hito o Kesu Nawatobi" (Japanese: 人を消すなわ跳び) | March 31, 1984 |
| 10 | "Goodbye Yellow"; Transliteration: "Sayonara Ierō" (Japanese: さよならイエロー) | April 7, 1984 |
| 11 | "Enter, New Warrior Jun"; Transliteration: "Shin Senshi Jun Tōjō" (Japanese: 新戦士ジュン登場) | April 14, 1984 |
| 12 | "Murderer Green!"; Transliteration: "Satsujinsha Gurīn!" (Japanese: 殺人者グリーン！) | April 21, 1984 |
| 13 | "I'm Jun!"; Transliteration: "Jun yo!" (Japanese: ジュンよ！) | April 28, 1984 |
| 14 | "Neo Intellect Brain!"; Transliteration: "Shin Zunō Burein!" (Japanese: 新頭脳ブレイン！) | May 5, 1984 |
| 15 | "The Female Warrior's Flaming Oath"; Transliteration: "Onna Senshi Honō no Chikai" (Japanese: 女戦士炎の誓い) | May 12, 1984 |
| 16 | "Run, 21599 Seconds"; Transliteration: "Hashire Ni-Man-Sen-Gobyaku-Kyū-Jū-Kyū-byō" (Japanese: 走れ21599秒) | May 19, 1984 |
| 17 | "I Saw Ryūgū Castle"; Transliteration: "Boku wa Tatsumiya-jō o Mita" (Japanese: 僕は龍宮城を見た) | May 26, 1984 |
| 18 | "The ESPer Girl's Prayer"; Transliteration: "Chōnōryoku Shōjo no Inori" (Japanese: 超能力少女の祈り) | June 2, 1984 |
| 19 | "My Father is Doctor Man"; Transliteration: "Chichi wa Dokutā Man" (Japanese: 父はドクターマン) | June 9, 1984 |
| 20 | "Prince's Challenge!"; Transliteration: "Purinsu no Chōsen!" (Japanese: プリンスの挑戦！) | June 16, 1984 |
| 21 | "Protect the Biobase"; Transliteration: "Mamore Baio Bēsu" (Japanese: 守れバイオベース) | June 23, 1984 |
| 22 | "A Great Burgalar!? Blue!"; Transliteration: "Ō Dorobō!? Burū!" (Japanese: 大泥棒！？ブルー！) | June 30, 1984 |
| 23 | "Gyo! Attack of the Puppets!"; Transliteration: "Gyo! Ningyō no Shūgeki!" (Japanese: ギョ！人形の襲撃！) | July 7, 1984 |
| 24 | "The Exploding Flower of Love"; Transliteration: "Bakuhatsu Suru Ai no Hana" (Japanese: 爆発する愛の花) | July 14, 1984 |
| 25 | "Prince's Ghost?"; Transliteration: "Purinsu no Yūrei?" (Japanese: プリンスの幽霊？) | July 21, 1984 |
| 26 | "My Father's Dreadful Secret"; Transliteration: "Osorubeki Chichi no Himitsu" (Japanese: 恐るべき父の秘密) | July 28, 1984 |
| 27 | "The Female Warriors of Spider Hell"; Transliteration: "Kumo Jigoku no Onna Senshi" (Japanese: クモ地獄の女戦士) | August 4, 1984 |
| 28 | "The Assassination of Doctor Man"; Transliteration: "Dokutā Man Ansatsu" (Japanese: ドクターマン暗殺) | August 11, 1984 |
| 29 | "The Day Tokyo Disappeared!?"; Transliteration: "Tōkyō ga Kieru Hi!?" (Japanese: 東京が消える日！？) | August 18, 1984 |
| 30 | "Ultimate Canth's Demon Sword"; Transliteration: "Saikyō Kansu no Ma Ken" (Japanese: 最強カンスの魔剣) | August 25, 1984 |
| 31 | "New Model!? Megas Arrives"; Transliteration: "Shingata!? Megasu Shutsugen" (Japanese: 新型！？メガス出現) | September 1, 1984 |
| 32 | "Gear's Great Remodelling Plan"; Transliteration: "Gia no Dai Kaizō Sakusen" (Japanese: ギアの大改造作戦) | September 8, 1984 |
| 33 | "Has It Come Forth!? The New Finishing Move"; Transliteration: "Deru ka!? Shin Hissatsu-waza" (Japanese: 出るか！？新必殺技) | September 15, 1984 |
| 34 | "Behold!! Bio Power"; Transliteration: "Mi yo! Baio no Chikara" (Japanese: 見よ！バイオの力) | September 22, 1984 |
| 35 | "The Sixth Man"; Transliteration: "Rokubanme no Otoko" (Japanese: 6番目の男) | September 29, 1984 |
| 36 | "The Transforming Boy"; Transliteration: "Henshin Bōi" (Japanese: 変身ボーイ) | October 6, 1984 |
| 37 | "The Assassin Silva!"; Transliteration: "Koroshiya Shiruba!" (Japanese: 殺し屋シルバ！) | October 13, 1984 |
| 38 | "The Enigmatic Balzion"; Transliteration: "Nazo no Barujion" (Japanese: 謎のバルジオン) | October 20, 1984 |
| 39 | "Mason's Trap!"; Transliteration: "Meisun no Wana!" (Japanese: メイスンのワナ！) | October 27, 1984 |
| 40 | "Stolen Turbo!"; Transliteration: "Ubawareta Tābo!" (Japanese: 奪われたターボ！) | November 3, 1984 |
| 41 | "The Demonic Lullaby"; Transliteration: "Akuma no Komoriuta!" (Japanese: 悪魔の子守り唄！) | November 10, 1984 |
| 42 | "Gou! Risk Your Life!"; Transliteration: "Gō! Inochi o Kakero!" (Japanese: 郷！命を賭けろ！) | November 17, 1984 |
| 43 | "The Sailor-Suited Soldier"; Transliteration: "Sērā-fuku no Senshi" (Japanese: セーラー服の戦士) | November 24, 1984 |
| 44 | "The Beautiful Conscience Circuit"; Transliteration: "Utsukishiki Ryōshin Kairo" (Japanese: 美しき良心回路) | December 1, 1984 |
| 45 | "Human Bomb, Jun!"; Transliteration: "Ningen Bakudan Jun!" (Japanese: 人間爆弾ジュン！) | December 8, 1984 |
| 46 | "Escape! The Town of Traps!"; Transliteration: "Dasshutsu! Wana no Machi!" (Japanese: 脱出！わなの町！) | December 15, 1984 |
| 47 | "Professor Shibata's True Colors!?"; Transliteration: "Shibata-hakase no Shōtai!?" (Japanese: 柴田博士の正体！？) | December 22, 1984 |
| 48 | "Enter! Balzion"; Transliteration: "Shutsugen! Barujion" (Japanese: 出現！バルジオン) | December 29, 1984 |
| 49 | "Critical Bio Robo"; Transliteration: "Ayaushi Baio Robo" (Japanese: 危うしバイオロボ) | January 5, 1985 |
| 50 | "Assault Neograd"; Transliteration: "Totsugeki Neogurādo" (Japanese: 突撃ネオグラード) | January 12, 1985 |
| 51 (Final) | "Goodbye, Peebo"; Transliteration: "Sayonara Pībo" (Japanese: さよならピーボ) | January 19, 1985 |

== Movie ==
A movie version of Chōdenshi Bioman premiered at the Toei Manga Matsuri film festival on July 14, 1984, the same day episode 24 aired. It was directed by Nagafumi Hori and written by Hirohisa Soda, who both worked on the series. The events of the movie are set somewhere between Episodes 11 and 31 due to the presence of Jun Yabuki as Yellow Four and the appearance of all five Beastnoids.

== Cast ==
- Shirō Gō: Ryōsuke Sakamoto (阪本 良介, Sakamoto Ryōsuke)
- Shingo Takasugi: Naoto Ōta (太田 直人, Ōta Naoto)
- Ryūta Nanbara: Akito Ōsuga (大須賀 昭人, Ōsuga Akito)
- Mika Koizumi: Yuki Yajima (矢島 由紀, Yajima Yuki)
- Jun Yabuki: Sumiko Tanaka (田中 澄子, Tanaka Sumiko)
- Hikaru Katsuragi: Michiko Makino (牧野 美千子, Makino Michiko)
- Shota Yamamori: Hikaru Kurosaki (?, Kurosaki Hikaru)
- Doctor Shibata: Tadao Nakamaru (中丸 忠雄, Nakamaru Tadao)
- Shūichi Kageyama, Prince: Hidenori Iura (井浦 秀知, Iura Hidenori)
- Doctor Man: Munemaru Kōda (幸田 宗丸, Kōda Munemaru)
- Meison: Hirohisa Nakata (中田 博久, Nakata Hirohisa)
- Farrah: Yōko Asuka (飛鳥 裕子, Asuka Yōko)
- Farrah Cat: Yukari Oshima (大島ゆかり, Ōshima Yukari)
- Monster: Strong Kongō (ストロング金剛, Sutorongu Kongō)

=== Voice actors ===
- Peebo: Yoshiko Ōta (太田 淑子, Ōta Yoshiko)
- Mettzler: Hiroshi Izawa (伊沢 弘, Izawa Hiroshi)
- Jyuoh: Masahiro Anzai (安西 正弘, Anzai Masahiro)
- Psygorn: Keisuke Yamashita (山下 啓介, Yamashita Keisuke)
- Aquaiger: Hirotaka Nagai (永井 寛孝, Nagai Hirotaka)
- Messarju: Shun Yashiro (八代 駿, Yashiro Shun)
- Bio Hunter Silva: Kazuo Hayashi (林 一夫, Hayashi Kazuo)
- Narrator: Ichirō Murakoshi (村越 伊知郎, Murakoshi Ichirō)

=== English pilot cast ===
- Mark Dacascos as Victor Lee/Biorhythm Red
- Miguel Núñez as Zack Taylor/Biorhythm Green
- Tom Silardi as Billy Cranston/Biorhythm Blue
- Tricia Leigh Fisher as Trini Crystal/Biorhythm Yellow
- Rebecca Staples as Kimberly Harte/Biorhythm Pink

== Songs ==
=== Opening theme ===
- "Choudenshi Bioman" (超電子バイオマン, Chōdenshi Baioman)
  - Lyrics: Chinfa Kan (康 珍化, Kan Chinfa) (Korean: 강진화; RR: Gang Jin-hwa)
  - Composition: Kunihiko Kase (加瀬 邦彦, Kase Kunihiko)
  - Arrangement: Tatsumi Yano (矢野 立美, Yano Tatsumi)
  - Artist: Takayuki Miyauchi (宮内 タカユキ, Miyauchi Takayuki)

=== Ending theme ===
- "Biomic Soldier" (バイオミック・ソルジャー, Baiomikku Sorujā)
  - Lyrics: Kang Jin-hwa
  - Composition: Kunihiko Kase
  - Arrangement: Tatsumi Yano
  - Artist: Takayuki Miyauchi

== International broadcast and home video ==
- In its home country of Japan, the series aired in TV Asahi from February 4, 1984, to January 26, 1985, airing every Saturday at 6.00 p.m. Over two decades later, the series was released on DVD by Toei Video in five volumes from August 6, 2008, to December 5, 2008. The first volume had eleven episodes featured with the other four volumes containing ten each in a set of two discs with each release. Despite being an older series by that point, the first volume sold very well there as it became the second highest-selling Tokusatsu series to be released on DVD that August. Seven episodes were included in the "Super Sentai Ichimi Blu-Ray 1982-1986" Blu-Ray release on April 14, 2021. The Bioman film was released on VHS, DVD, and Blu-Ray as well.
- The series was immensely popular in France and achieved a massive cult following. It was given a French dub and was produced and licensed by AB Groupe with all episodes covered with dubbing work by Studio Garcia Ktorza. It first aired in Canal+ in 1985, every Saturday at 12:30, and later on TF1, on the program Club Dorothée, from September 2, 1987, with singer/actor Bernard Minet recording a French version of the show's theme for that country. Following the success of Bioman, AB Groupe had since imported, broadcast, and produced dubs for more Super Sentai shows into the region.
- In Thailand, the series aired on Channel 7 with a Thai dub from April 1985 till May 1986.
- In the Philippines, it aired on ABS-CBN from 1987 to 1988 and IBC from 1993 to 1994 with an English dub by Telesuccess Productions, Toei's Filipino licensor. All episodes were covered for both dubs. It was also one of the last tokusatsu programs in the country to be dubbed in English, as another Toei Tokusatsu being Space Sheriff Shaider airing that year in 1987 on ABS-CBN is what started the popular trend of dubbing Tokusatsu series into Tagalog. And then later on, Bioman was re-aired and re-dubbed in Tagalog. All 51 episodes were covered for both English and Tagalog dubs.
- In Greece, some episodes were dubbed into Greek and released on home video in 1987 as Electronic Bionic Man (Ηλεκτρονικός Βιονικός Άνθρωπος). This was the only Super Sentai series to be ever officially released in the region.
- In South Korea, the series was imported by Daeyoung Panda and was given a Korean dub in 1990 under Space Commando Bioman. (우주특공대 바이오맨) This was the third Super Sentai series to air in the region.
- In 1986, Haim Saban produced a pilot episode of an American adaptation of the series simply titled Bio-Man. This show involved 5 rangers with a prototype Alpha 5 based on Peebo. Saban pitched to many TV stations, however, with no interest from any stations, the show was never picked up. However the idea would resurface into Mighty Morphin Power Rangers.
