= New Opera Singapore =

Opera company

New Opera Singapore Limited
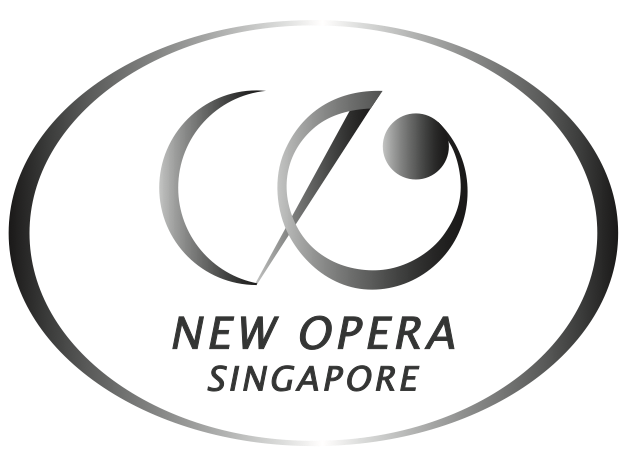
- Founded: 2011
- Headquarters: Singapore
- Website: www.newopera.sg

New Opera Singapore (NOS) is an Institution of Public Character Charity (IPC UEN: 201114924K) founded in July 2011 by Korean-Singaporean Soprano, Jeong Ae-Ree. It is a Major Company grant recipient of the National Arts Council, Singapore for the FY 2019 - 2022.

== Past productions ==
2017: Monteverdi L'incoronazione di Poppea (The Coronation of Poppea). This production was staged at Victoria Theatre on 29 July 2017 and 30 July 2017. The storyline was based on events during the reign of Emperor Nero in ancient Rome.

Pergolesi Stabat Mater. This production was staged at Victoria Concert Hall on 7 April 2017. Four singers, a string quartet and a chamber organ was used.

CabaRed. This production was staged at Aliwal Arts Centre on 22 January 2017.

2016: A Heart that Loves/Poet's Love. This production was the first concert for the Youth Opera as well as the first concert for New Opera Singapore's Artist-in-Residence. This production was staged at Esplanade, Recital Studio on 2 November 2016. After the intermission in the second half of the recital, Jonathan Charles Tay (Tenor), New Opera Singapore's first Artist-in-Residence, sung songs translated from Schumann's best known song cycle, Poet's Love its actually Dichterliebe 48. His soulful strong vocals and dramatic expressions were highly praised.

Jacques Offenbach's Orpheus in the Underworld . This production was staged at Victoria Theatre on 29 July 2016 and 31 July 2016. New Opera Singapore commended its fifth commemoration with another stellar execution at the restored Victoria Theater. Established by Korean Soprano and singing educator Jeong Ae Ree, the fit troupe exhibits the exemplary Greek story of Orpheus and Euridice, deciphered by Jeremy Sams, with music composed by Jacques Offenbach. Orpheus in the Underworld is no standard retelling of the legend be that as it may, and rather subverts it completely, peppering the execution with sexual insinuation, lethal plots and devious intoxicated divine beings.

Donizetti's Rita: This production was staged at Esplanade, Recital Studio on 13 April 2016. Executive Stefanos Rassios' arranging, which removed spoken words yet kept all the music, was highly commended.

Gaustave Vaëz's French lyrics was sung with English subtitles.

Féte Blanche, Baroque Music in White: This production was staged at Esplanade, Recital Studio on 8 January 2016.

2015: House of Horror. This production was staged at Esplanade, Recital Studio on 29 October 2015.

Fundraising Gala, New Opera Singapore's 4th Anniversary: This event was held at The Fullerton Ballroom on 12 September 2015.

Benjamin Britten's Turn of the Screw: This production was held at Victoria Theatre on 31 July and 2 August 2015.

A Knife in the Dark: Songs of Kurt Weill: This production was held at The Arts House Chamber on 10 April 2015.

Liebeslieder: This production was held at Esplanade, Recital Studio on 8 January 2015.

2014: Dichterliebe and Hermit Songs: This production was held at The Arts House Chamber on 25 November 2014.

Johann Strauss II: Die Fledermaus: This production was held at Victoria Theatre on 25 and 27 July 2014.

Opera Comique at the hotel: This production was held at The Arts House Chamber on 15 April 2014.

2013: Britten: A Celebration in Song was a production in tribute to the renowned Benjamin Britten, this was held at the Arts House Living Room on 12 October 2013.

My Nights with Dido and My Days with Aeneas: This production was held at SOTA Theatre on 26 and 27 July 2013.

Opera Comique: At the Airport. This production was held at The Arts House Chamber on 9 March 2013.

2012: Die Schone Mullerin, Poems by Wilhelm Müller: This production was held at The Arts House Chamber on 20 and 21 February 2012.

Gaetano Donizetti's L’elisir D’amore. This production was held at SIA Theatre Laselle College of the Arts on 20, 21 and 22 July 2012.

Opera Comique 2: In the Classroom: This production was held at Recital Studio, Esplanade on 17 February 2012.

Opera Comique: In the Office: This production was held at The Arts House Chamber on 6 August 2011.

== Youth Opera Comique ==
The NOS Youth Opera Comique offers solo and group vocal trainings that focus on healthy vocal techniques. An annual concert is staged where an original storyline is created for the young talents to gain public performing experience as well as a showcase of their musicality to family, friends and the public.

In 2011, New Opera Singapore had its inaugural performance with Opera Comique: In the Office at the Singapore Arts House Chamber.

In 2012, New Opera Singapore began a series of productions that included the second Opera Comique production, ‘In the Classroom’; Gaetano Donizetti’s bel canto opera L'elisir d'amore, and Franz Schubert’s Die Schöne Müllerin.

Its performance of L'elisir d'amore was noted as a "commendable first show" despite technical limitations.

In 2013, New Opera Singapore began its season with its third installment of its Opera Comique series with ‘At the Airport’.

== Outreach ==
New Opera Singapore has an outreach programme titled ‘Who's Afraid of Opera?’. This programme is targeted specifically at schools. In these sessions, students are exposed to the context of famous arias and are taught to understand the interplay between music, words and acting as an expression of the intent of the character and the composer.
