= Joyce Koh =

Singaporean–New Zealand academic

Academic background
- Education: Indiana University Bloomington
- Thesis: The use of scaffolding in introductory technology skills instruction for pre-service teachers (2008)

Joyce Hwee Ling Koh is a Singaporean–New Zealand academic, and is professor of higher education at the University of Otago, specialising in educational technology, and improving teacher development. Koh has developed tools and frameworks for teacher assessment which are used internationally.

== Academic career ==
Koh completed a PhD titled The use of scaffolding in introductory technology skills instruction for pre-service teachers at the Indiana University Bloomington. From 2008 to 2015, Joh was based in the Nanyang Technological University National Institute of Education in Singapore. Koh then joined the faculty of the Higher Education Development Centre at University of Otago, rising to full professor in 2024.

Koh's research focuses on technology in education, and improving teacher education. She is interested in how teachers engage with emerging technology, and has developed tools that use design thinking to assess competencies and incorporate technology. These tools include technological pedagogical content knowledge (TPACK) surveys, which are used to assess how teachers integrate technology in their curriculum, and have been used internationally. She has also developed tools to assess student technological competency. Koh co-authored a book published in 2015 on how design thinking can be incorporated into education. Koh serves as a Senior Associate Editor of the Asia Pacific Education Researcher, and was an invited plenary speaker at a Centre for Research in International Education conference at the Auckland Institute of Studies.

== Selected works ==
- Joyce Hwee Ling Koh, Ching Sing Chai, Benjamin Wong, Huang-Yao Hong (2015) Design for thinking for education: Conceptions and Applications in Teaching and Learning. Springer Science+Business Media Singapore. ISBN 978-981-287-444-3 DOI 10.1007/978-981-287
- J.H.L. Koh; C.S. Chai; C.C. Tsai (2010). "Examining the technological pedagogical content knowledge of Singapore pre‐service teachers with a large‐scale survey". Journal of Computer Assisted Learning. 26 (6): 563–573. doi:10.1111/j.1365-2729.2010.00372.x. Wikidata Q126367564.
- Ching Sing Chai; Joyce Hwee Ling Koh; Chin-Chung Tsai; Lynde Lee Wee Tan (2011). "Modeling primary school pre-service teachers' Technological Pedagogical Content Knowledge (TPACK) for meaningful learning with information and communication technology (ICT)". Computers and Education. 57 (1): 1184–1193. doi:10.1016/j.compedu.2011.01.007. Wikidata Q126367565.
- Sze Yee Lye; Joyce Hwee Ling Koh (2014). "Review on teaching and learning of computational thinking through programming: What is next for K-12?". Computers in Human Behavior. 41: 51–61. doi:10.1016/j.chb.2014.09.012. Wikidata Q126367566.
- Joyce Hwee Ling Koh; Ching Sing Chai; Benjamin Wong; Huang-Yao Hong (2015), Design Thinking and Education, pp. 1–15, doi:10.1007/978-981-287-444-3_1, Wikidata Q57611964
