= Kō Station =

Kō Station may refer to either of the following railway stations in Japan:

- Kō Station (Aichi) on the Meitetsu Nagoya Main Line
- Kō Station (Tokushima) on the Tokushima Line
