= Wei Hu Koh =

Wei Hu Koh is an electrical engineer from Pacrim Technology in Irvine, California. He was named a Fellow of the Institute of Electrical and Electronics Engineers (IEEE) in 2013 for his development of three-dimensional multichip modules and flip chip interconnects.
