= Rena Koh =

Fashion designer (born c. 1970)

Rena Koh (born c. 1970) is a Malaysian-born British fashion designer, especially noted for her bridal wear. She is based in Boca Raton, Florida.

== History ==
Based in Hong Kong in the early 1990s, in 1993 she won the "Best Collection Award" at the Hong Kong Fashion Week and at the 1997 British Bridal Awards three of her dresses were entered and one won the best "Long and Romantic" dress.

In an attempt to break into the US market in the 1990s her dresses were sold with other British designers, and sold as "The Designer Collection". Her dresses are sold in global cities such as New York City and Chicago, London and Tokyo, and she has Rena Koh Collections stores in Boca Raton, Florida and on James Road in Tyseley, Birmingham in the UK. Her dresses appeared at the debut edition of the New York Bridal Apparel Show in April 1994 and was one of the busiest booths with visitors on display. In 2004, her designer bridal gowns were nominated for a national DEBI Award, alongside gowns by the likes of Eve of Milady, Lazaro, and Monique Lhuillier.

== Style ==
Rena Koh is known for her designer bridal gowns. Textile Asia mentioned that she made "elegant dresses", "cut in georgette, silk chifron, silk crepe with folds of satin and heavy folds of deep velvet". In 2001, one of her dresses, a "sleeveless gown, approximately 15 to 20 yards of silk organza with a Basque waist, delicate beading along the neckline and the front skirt and a built-in tulle underskirt and boned bodice" was donated by the Bridal Salon at Marshall Field's to the Lyric Opera of Chicago and worn by Alexandra von der Weth and Noemi Nademann in the Cafe Momus scene in Act II of Giacomo Puccini's "La Boheme" in January–February 2002.

Her dresses are retailed at $1,500- $3,000, and her used dresses often sell for $600–800. In 2013 the charity Oxfam are selling a Size 12 dress of Rena Koh's for £110, describing it as a "gorgeous wedding dress from Rena Koh in a heavy ivory polyester & trimmed with festoons of rosebuds with clusters of pearl stamens at their centres."
