= Wataru Yamazaki =

Japanese footballer

Personal information
- Full name: Wataru Yamazaki
- Date of birth: September 18, 1980 (age 46)
- Place of birth: Saitama, Japan
- Height: 1.73 m (5 ft 8 in)
- Position: Midfielder

Youth career
- 1999–2002: Nihon University

Senior career*
Years	Team	Apps	(Gls)
2003–2009	Thespa Kusatsu	186	(15)
Total		186	(15)
- * Club domestic league appearances and goals

Wataru Yamazaki (山崎 渡, Yamazaki Wataru; born September 18, 1980) is a former Japanese football player. He first played for Nihon University in 2003 and later transferred to Thespa Kusatsu in 2010 after 7 years.

== Club statistics ==
Club performance			League		Cup		Total	
Season	Club	League	Apps	Goals	Apps	Goals	Apps	Goals
Japan			League		Emperor's Cup		Total	
2003	Thespa Kusatsu	Regional Leagues	12	3	1	0	13	3
2004	Thespa Kusatsu	Football League	15	2	2	0	17	2
2005	Thespa Kusatsu	J2 League	24	1	1	0	25	1
2006	Thespa Kusatsu	J2 League	37	4	1	0	38	4
2007	Thespa Kusatsu	J2 League	24	0	0	0	24	0
2008	Thespa Kusatsu	J2 League	34	3	1	0	35	3
2009	Thespa Kusatsu	J2 League	40	2	1	0	41	2
Country	Japan		186	15	7	0	193	15
Total			186	15	7	0	193	15
