= Joyce Beetuan Koh =

- Birth name: Koh Bee Tuan
- Born: 9 June 1968 (age 57); Singapore
- Genres: Contemporary classical music
- Occupation(s): Composer, Educator, Conductor
- Instrument: Piano
- Website: jbtkoh.net

Joyce Beetuan Koh (born June 9, 1968) is a Singaporean composer, sound artist, and educator.

Koh is the Associate Dean of the School of Interdisciplinary Arts at the Nanyang Academy of Fine Arts.

== Career ==
Koh received her Bachelor of Music and Master of Music degrees in composition at King's College London under the tutorship of David Lumsdaine. She also studied at The University of York with Nicola Lefanu where she received her Ph.D. in composition in 1997.

In 1995, Koh received a Nadia Boulanger scholarship, working alongside composer Brian Ferneyhough. Later, she composed as a collaborator with Tristan Murail in 1996 and with Hans Tutschku and Mikhail Malt from 1997 to 1998.

=== Music Education ===
In 2004, Kho was offered a fellowship in residence at a German music school, Herrenhaus Edenkoben. Koh returned to Singapore in 2007 and joined School of the Arts, Singapore as a founding faculty member. Koh contributed to the founding of the Composers' Society of Singapore and served as president from 2013 to 2016.

== Awards ==
Koh was awarded the Young Artist Award by the National Arts Council (Singapore) in 1998.

== Creative work ==
=== Collaborations ===
Koh's music has been performed by BBC Symphony Orchestra, Hungarian Radio Budapest Symphony Orchestra, Stavanger Symphony Orchestra, Singapore Symphony Orchestra, Résonance Contemporaine, The Song Company of Australia, Nieuw Ensemble, Take 5, and Reconsil, as well as by soloists including Prodromos Symeonidis, Frode Haltli, and Thalia Myers.

Her compositions for dance include a series of works with The Arts Fission Company, such as In the Name of Red (2015), a site-specific work for the inauguration festival of the National Gallery Singapore. Koh has created multimedia performances Away We Go (2015) with Etienne Turpin, commissioned by NTU Centre of Contemporary Art, and On the String (2010), commissioned by the Singapore Arts Festival.

She co-created the interactive sound installation The Canopy (2010–13), presented at the World Stage Design Festival (UK, 2013) and the International Computer Music Conference (UK, 2011). Koh collaborated with theatre director Steve Dixon on adapting T. S. Eliot's The Waste Land in a one-actor piece with video and electroacoustic sound.

=== Selected compositions ===
==== Orchestra ====
- TAI (1997)
- Granite Harbour (1995)

==== Chamber music ====
- Fingerprints for octet (2015)
- Piano Peals (2006)
- Edenkobener Beethoven Bagatellen (2005)
- les pierres magenta for piano and ensemble (2002)
- la pierre magenta for piano (2001)

==== Works for stage and dance ====
- In the name of red (2015)
- The Waste Land (2013)
- Locust Wrath (2013)
- On the String (2010)
- 16 Wege das Nein zu vermeiden (2005)

==== Multimedia ====
- Shape of a City (2015)
- Hearing Lines (2013)

=== Discography ===
- Edenkobener Beethoven Bagatellen (2005, with BeeperDesign)
- Piano Peals (2004, with ABRSM)
