= Hikaru Kurosaki =

Japanese actor (1962–2026)

- 黒崎 輝
- Born: January 31, 1962; Sakai, Japan
- Died: July 2, 2026 (aged 64); Motobu, Japan
- Occupations: Actor; stuntman
- Years active: 1973–1995
- Spouse: Yuko Asuka (1984–2011)

Hikaru Kurosaki (黒崎 輝; January 31, 1962 – July 2, 2026), born Seiki Kurosaki (黒崎 誠輝), was a Japanese actor and a stuntman. He is best known for starring as Juspion in the 1985 tokusatsu series MegaBeast Investigator Juspion.

== Early life and career ==
Hikaru Kurosaki, born Seiki Kurosaki, was born on January 31, 1962, in Sakai, Osaka Prefecture. He became inspired by martial arts film star Sonny Chiba after watching television reruns of the series Key Hunter.

He started his acting career when he joined the Japan Action Club in 1978; he played a Ninder combatant in Spider-Man. He made his acting debut in 1980 in the TV drama Shogun's Samurai. He appeared in Choudenshi Bioman in 1984. He portrayed Shota Yamamori, who also portrayed Magne Warrior. Kurosaki's best known role was Juspion in the series MegaBeast Investigator Juspion.

In the early 1990s, due to disagreements with Sonny Chiba, Kurosaki decided to end his acting career. Since then, he worked as an instructor and guide for scuba diving in Okinawa.

== Personal life and death ==
Kurosaki married Yuko Asuka on May 9, 1987. They both founded a save-Earth campaign called Mother Earth. Yuko died on December 5, 2011.

Kurosaki died in Motobu, Japan on July 2, 2026, at the age of 64.
