= Wataru =

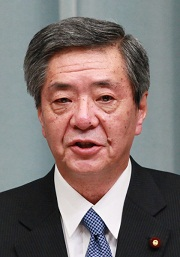
- Wataru Takeshita (1946–2021), Japanese politician
- Pronunciation: wataɾɯ (IPA)
- Gender: Male

Origin
- Origin: Japanese
- Meaning: Different meanings depending on the kanji used

Wataru is a masculine Japanese given name.

== Written forms ==
Wataru can be written using several kanji characters. Here are some examples:

- 渉, "ford"
- 渡, "ferry over"
- 亘, "extend across"
- 航, "navigate"
- 和, "harmony"
- 亙, "extend across"
- 弥, "more and more"

The name can also be written in hiragana わたる or katakana ワタル.

== Notable people with the name ==
- Wataru Abe (阿部 渉; born 1967), Japanese announcer, television personality, and news anchor
- Wataru Asō (麻生 渡; 1939–2025), Japanese bureaucrat, politician and governor of Fukuoka Prefecture
- Wataru Endo (遠藤 航; born 1993), Japanese footballer
- Wataru Fukuda (福田 亘; born 1964), Japanese actor
- Wataru Harada (原田 亘; born 1996), Japanese footballer
- Wataru Hashimoto (橋本 和; born 1986), Japanese footballer
- Wataru Hatano (羽多野 渉; born 1982), Japanese voice actor, singer, actor, narrator, radio MC and comedian
- Wataru Hidenoumi (秀ノ海 渡累; born 1965), Japanese retired sumo wrestler
- Wataru Hiromatsu (廣松 渉; 1933–1994), Japanese philosopher
- Wataru Hiyane (比屋根 渉; born 1987), Japanese professional baseball outfielder
- Wataru Hokoyama (鋒山 亘; born 1974), Japanese composer, conductor, and orchestrator
- Wataru Ikeda (池田 渉; born 1975), Japanese former professional rugby union player
- Wataru Inoue (井上 亘; born 1973), Japanese professional wrestler
- Wataru Inoue (footballer) (井上 渉; born 1986), Japanese footballer
- Wataru Ise (伊勢 渉; born 1996), Japanese footballer
- Wataru Ishijima (石島 渉; 1906–1980), Japanese paleontologist and geologist
- Wataru Ishizaka (石坂 わたる; born 1976), Japanese politician, social worker and former school teacher
- Wataru Ito (伊藤 渉; born 1969), Japanese politician
- Wataru Iwashita (岩下 航; born 1999), Japanese footballer
- Wataru Kaji (鹿地 亘; 1903–1982), Japanese writer, literary critic and political activist
- Wataru Kamijo (上條 航; born 2006), Japanese professional soccer player
- Wataru Kamimura (上村 亘; born 1986), Japanese professional shogi player
- Wataru Karashima (辛島 航; born 1990), Japanese professional baseball pitcher
- Wataru Kitahara (北原 亘; born 1982), Japanese futsal player
- Wataru Kubo (久保 亘; 1929–2003), Japanese politician
- Wataru Kurihara (栗原 渉; born 1965), Japanese politician
- Wataru Matsumoto (松本 航; born 1996), Japanese professional baseball player
- Wataru Miki (美木 航; born 1980), Japanese mixed martial artist
- Wataru Mimura (三村 渉; 1954–2021), Japanese screenwriter
- Wataru Misaka (三阪 亙; 1923–2019), Japanese-American basketball player
- Wataru Miyawaki (宮脇 渉, born 1980), vocalist of Japanese rock band 12012
- Wataru Mori (森 渉; born 1983), Japanese actor
- Wataru Morishige (森重 航; born 2000), Japanese speed skater
- Wataru Murata (村田 亙; born 1968), Japanese former rugby player and coach
- Wataru Murayama (村山 渉), Japanese manga writer
- Wataru Murofushi (室伏 航; born 1995), Japanese footballer
- Wataru Nakamura (中村 亘; 1921–1951), American United States Army soldier
- Wataru Noguchi (野口 航; born 1996), Japanese football player
- Wataru Sakata (坂田 亘; born 1973), Japanese professional wrestler and martial arts fighter
- Wataru Sasaki (佐々木 渉; born 1996), Japanese footballer
- Wataru Takagi (高木 渉; born 1966), Japanese voice actor
- Wataru Takamatsu (高松 渡; born 1999), Japanese professional baseball infielder
- Wataru Takeishi (竹石 渉; born 1982), Japanese music video director
- Wataru Takeshita (竹下 亘; 1946–2021), Japanese politician
- Wataru Tanaka (田中 渉; born 2000), Japanese footballer
- Wataru Tanigawa (谷川 航; born 1996), Japanese artistic gymnast
- Wataru Urata (浦田 わたる; born 1989), Japanese singer and voice actor
- Wataru Watari (渡 航; born 1987), Japanese light novel author and screenwriter
- Wataru Yamada (山田 渉; born 1966), Japanese boxer
- Wataru Yamazaki (山崎 渡; born 1980), Japanese footballer
- Wataru Yashiro (八代 弥; born 1994), Japanese shogi player
- Wataru Yazawa (矢澤 航; born 1991), Japanese hurdler
- Wataru Yokoo (横尾 渉; born 1986), Japanese singer, actor and haiku poet
- Wataru Yoshikawa (吉川 和多留; born 1968), Japanese motorcycle rider
- Wataru Yoshizumi (吉住 渉; born 1963), Japanese manga artist

== Fictional characters ==
- Wataru Ikusabe (戦部 ワタル)), a character from Mashin Hero Wataru
- Wataru Kurenai (紅 渡), main character from Kamen Rider Kiva
- Wataru Hoshi (ホシ・ワタル), the main character from Star Trigon
- Wataru Azuma (東 航), the main character from Tumbling
- Wataru Sanzu (三途 渡), a character from Inazuma Eleven
- Wataru Onaga (尾長 渉), a character from the manga and anime Haikyu!! with the position of middle blocker from Fukurodani Academy
- Wataru Kuon (久遠 渡,), a supporting character from the football manga Blue Lock
- Wataru Hibiya (日比谷 渉), a character from the dating sim video game Tokimeki Memorial Girl's Side
- Wataru Hibiki (日々樹 渉,), a character from the anime and game Ensemble Stars!

== People with the surname ==
- James Wataru, American politician

== See also ==
- Waru
