= Kou Roun =

Cambodian politician

Kou Roun is the former minister for national security of Cambodia.
