= Kou Yingjie =

Kou Yingjie (simplified Chinese: 寇英杰; traditional Chinese: 寇英傑; pinyin: Kòu Yīngjié; 1880 – December 1952) was a military leader in the Republic of China. He belonged to the Zhili clique. In the end, he participated to the Wang Jingwei regime. His courtesy name was Bichen (弼臣). There are two theories about his birthplace, one was Yanggu, Shandong, the other was Lijin, Shandong.

== Biography ==
Kou Yingjie worked as a military personnel in Henan Province for a long time, and he belonged to Zhili clique.

In autumn 1924, after the Second Zhili–Fengtian War, Kou Yingjie was appointed to the Commander of the 2nd Mixed Brigade of the Hubei Army. In December, he promoted to the Commander of the 1st Brigade. Next October, he was appointed to the Commander of the 2nd Route Army by Wu Peifu. In 1926, Kou was appointed to the Supreme Commander of the Henan Army (豫軍總司令). After Wu was defeated by the National Revolutionary Army (NRA), Kou also resigned his post.

Later Kou Yingjie was appointed to the 12th Army of the Zhili-Shandong (Zhi-Lu) United Army which Zhang Zongchang commanded. But Zhang also was defeated by NRA, so Kou surrendered to them. Kou was appointed to the 44th Army of NRA.

After the Wang Jingwei regime was established, Kou Yingjie was appointed to the Councilor (Full General) of the General Staff Office but his achievements in this regime and the whereabouts of Kou were not known.

== See also ==
- List of people who disappeared

== Books ==
- Lai Xinxia (来新夏) (etc.) (2000). The History of Beiyang Warlords (北洋军阀史). Press of Nankai University (Nankai Daxue Chubanshe; 南开大学出版社). ISBN 7-310-01517-7.
- Tian Ziyu (田子渝) and Liu Dejun (刘德军) (1989). The Dictionary of the History of the Chinese Modern Warlords (中国近代军阀史词典). Press of Archive (Dang'an Chubanshe; 档案出版社). ISBN 7-5626-0244-1.
- Xu Youchun (徐友春) (main ed.) (2007). Unabridged Biographical Dictionary of the Republic, Revised and Enlarged Version (民国人物大辞典 增订版). Hebei People's Press (Hebei Renmin Chubanshe; 河北人民出版社). ISBN 978-7-202-03014-1.
- Liu Shoulin (刘寿林) (etc.ed.) (1995). The Chronological Table of the Republic's Officer (民国职官年表). Zhonghua Book Company. ISBN 7-101-01320-1.
