= Koh Masaki =

Japanese gay pornographic film actor (1983–2013)

- 真崎航
- Undated portrait of Masaki
- Born: July 20, 1983; Morioka, Iwate Prefecture, Japan
- Died: May 18, 2013 (aged 29); Tokyo, Japan
- Years active: 2009–2013
- Known for: Gay pornographic film actor

Koh Masaki (真崎航, Masaki Kō; July 20, 1983 – May 18, 2013) was a Japanese gay pornographic film actor. Among the most prolific and well-known figures in Japanese gay pornography, Masaki was the first Japanese pornographic film actor to openly identify as gay both in his films and in his personal life. He appeared in approximately 200 films in a career that spanned from 2009 to 2013.

== Biography ==
Masaki was born on July 20, 1983, in Morioka, Iwate Prefecture. In middle school he began regularly visiting Shinjuku Ni-chōme, Tokyo's gay village, after learning about the neighborhood from an issue of the gay men's magazine Peanuts. He later attended university in Sapporo while simultaneously working as a flight attendant and engaging in sex work. After graduating, he began working as an urisen (rentboy) at a gay bar in Nakano, Tokyo.

In 2009, he was scouted by the production company Japan Pictures and recruited to work as a gay adult film actor. While Masaki initially appeared in films as a gōguruman ("goggle man", a term for a pornographic actor who maintains anonymity by wearing swimming goggles or tinted sunglasses), he would quickly forgo this convention to become one of the first gay pornographic film actors in Japan to openly appear in adult films without obscuring his identity. Masaki was inspired by European pornography, and utilized what he described as a "western" performance style in his films; this chiefly involved performing as a self-identified gay man, contrasting typical Japanese gay pornography scenarios focused on degrading or sadistic scenarios involving heterosexual actors. Masaki appeared in approximately 200 films over the course of his career, which spanned from 2009 to 2013.

Beyond his career in pornography, Masaki worked as an underwear model and as a go-go boy. He was an advocate for HIV testing and condom usage, and regularly promoted safe sex initiatives in Japan, China, and Taiwan. In 2012, he appeared in the music video for artist Ayumi Hamasaki's single "How Beautiful You Are", which depicts him kissing his then-partner Tien Tien.

Masaki suffered from peritonitis, and underwent multiple surgeries to treat the condition. On May 18, 2013, he died at the age of 29 due to appendicitis and sepsis caused by a ruptured cecum arising from the affliction.

== Impact ==
Masaki has been described as one of the most famous and prolific gay pornographic film actors in Japan, with Rich Bellis of The Awl writing that Masaki "established a celebrity persona in a business where such a thing hadn't existed before". He was the first gay Japanese pornographic film actor to openly identify as gay both in his films and in his personal life, and one of the most prominent examples of a gay Japanese pornographic film actor to turn professional after breaking into the industry through nanpa (amateur scouting).

The academic Thomas Baudinette considers Masaki to be "the very definition of an ikanimo-kei" (literally "obviously gay type"), a term in Japanese gay culture denoting physically fit, conventionally attractive gay men who participate in nightlife and follow fashion trends. Baudinette argues that Masaki's popularity can be attributed in part to his typically masculine physical traits (Note: Baudinette further identifies Masaki as an "ideal example" of a tai'ikukai-kei, or "gym type", a category of gay men characterized by muscular bodies, short haircuts, and facial hair.) combined with his open identification as a gay man, which allowed him "to represent a role model of an explicitly 'masculine' gay subject position for Japanese same-sex attracted men", contrasting a Japanese media landscape that at the time was dominated by "cross-dressing comedians [...] implicitly understood as homosexual who regularly appear as objects of humor on Japanese variety television shows."

== See also ==
- Pornography in Japan

== External media ==
- "We Are Out! Kou & Tenten", serialized documentary featuring Masaki and his partner by Vice Japan (Japanese with English subtitles)
