= Princess Tenko =

- プリンセス・テンコー
- Born: Mariko Itakura; June 29, 1959 (age 66); Arai, Niigata, Japan
- Other names: Tenko Hikita; Tenko Hikita II
- Occupations: magician, illusionist, former singer
- Years active: 1978–present
- Title: Tenko Hikita
- Term: 1980–present
- Predecessor: Tenko Hikita I
- Musical career
- Also known as: Mari Asakaze
- Genres: Japanese pop
- Years active: 1978–1980
- Website: www.tenko.ne.jp

Tenko Hikita II (二代目・引田 天功, Nidaime (Second Generation) Hikita Tenkō) (born Mariko Itakura (板倉 満里子, Itakura Mariko); June 29, 1959), best known under the stage name of Princess Tenko and formerly Mari Asakaze (朝風 まり, Asakaze Mari), is a Japanese pop singer turned magician specialising in grand illusions.

== Biography ==
She was born Mariko Itakura in Arai, Niigata on June 29, 1959. At a young age, she suffered from a disease and was told that she might not live beyond the age of 18 years old. She received treatment at the children's hospital in the United States and had recovered since then.

In 1976, her mother sent her to be the apprentice to the Tenko Hikita I (初代・引田 天功, Shodai (First Generation) Hikita Tenkō), a male Japanese magician who was managed by the same person as Mariko. She debuted as a singer-magician under the stage name of Mari Asakaze (朝風 まり, Asakaze Mari) in 1978. As Mari, she guest-starred in the Denshi Sentai Denjiman episode 31 The Magician's Battle of Secret Arts.

The older Tenko died of heart disease on December 31, 1979 at the age of 45. Though he had several apprentices, his sponsors chose Mariko as the next Tenko Hikita. Mariko debuted as Tenko Hikita II (二代目・引田 天功, Nidaime (Second Generation) Hikita Tenkō) at Hotel New Otani in Tokyo on December 15, 1980. The sponsors believed that she would clear older Tenko's huge debt, a speculation which was successful. She guest-starred as herself in two Metal Hero Series: episode 29 of Uchuu Keiji Gavan and episode 24 of Choujinki Metalder.

In 1989, she was named Magician of the Year by the Academy of Magical Arts in Hollywood, becoming the first woman and the second Asian person to win the title. She debuted in North America at the Radio City Music Hall in 1994, and subsequently achieved worldwide fame. She was famous to the extent that Tenko and the Guardians of the Magic, an American magical girl-inspired cartoon series based on her character, was created and Mattel produced a line of fashion dolls named after her. In 1996, she became an honorary goodwill ambassador of the African Wild Animal Conservation Fund.

She was the subject of controversy after visiting North Korea in April 1998 where she reportedly met the former North Korean leader Kim Jong Il, but she would deny this in interviews out of fear of having serious consequences. So Tenko would only stated that the purpose of her visit was to perform at the Friendship Art Festival held in Pyongyang and to meet Korean artists there.

After that Tenko and Kim would meet and they spoke about the world of entertainment and about illusion and also other ordinary things. She also noted that Kim was very interested in Japan. Kim Jong Il was noted to be a fan of Tenko and owned all eight versions of the Princess Tenko dolls, and he had also ordered the construction of a theater in Pyongyang bearing her name. Tenko was later delayed from leaving but was released only when she promised to return to visit soon.

She would visit North Korea again in 2000 and performed for Kim Jong Il. During her visit, she fell ill and stayed at the hospital for a month. She was asked to stay in North Korea but she refused.

On July 24, 2007, she performed The Spike Illusion, but the trick went wrong, causing serious injury. After being released, she continued the show for a further thirty minutes before terminating it early at the urgings of her organizers due to her injuries.

Tenko met Kim Jong Il for the last time at a 2009 dinner party where he reportedly drank several glasses of whisky and later joked around with her. She was one of the selected foreigners invited to attend the funeral of Kim Jong Il in December 2011, but she declined.

== In popular culture ==
Tenko and the Guardians of the Magic, the cartoon series based on her by Saban, is centered on Princess Tenko leading a team of warriors (Bolt, Hawk, Steel and apprentice Ali) called the Guardians who tried to amass the scattered and stolen magical Starfire Gems, each of which had a special power. Standing against them were twin villains Janna and Jason, who had the power to combine into a two-headed dragon. The cartoon ran for a single season of 13 episodes from 1995 to 1996. At the end of each episode, the real Princess Tenko would appear on stage and perform an illusion or teach a magic trick.
