= Makoto Sumikawa =

Japanese actress and voice actress

- 澄川 真琴
- Born: Sumikawa Takayo; March 31, 1964 (age 61); Fujiidera, Osaka, Japan
- Occupations: actress, voice actor
- Years active: 1984–1991
- Spouse: Sunagawa Shingo

Makoto Sumikawa (澄川 真琴, Sumikawa Makoto; born March 31, 1964 in Osaka, Osaka Prefecture, Japan), also known as Jun Koyamaki (高野槇 じゅん, Kōyamaki Jun), is a Japanese actress and voice actor. From Osaka Prefecture, her real name is Takayo Sunagawa, and her maiden name Sumikawa. Her husband is Shingo Sunagawa of the original JAC Brothers.

== Filmography ==
=== TV drama ===
Year	Title	Role	Network	Other notes
1984	Shadow Warriors IV		Toei	
1986	Monday drama land "transparent girl"		Fuji TV	
1986 - 1987	Jikuu Senshi Spielban	Diana/Diana Lady	TV Asahi	
1987	Choujinki Metalder		TV Asahi	Episodes 25 & 26
1988 - 1989	Kamen Rider BLACK RX	Reiko Shiratori	MBS	
1990	Special Rescue Police Winspector	Navia	TV Asahi	

=== Voice actor ===
Year	Title	Role	Network
1987	Devilman: Tanjou-hen	Miki Makimura	
1990	Devilman: Yochou Sirene-hen	Miki Makimura	
1991	Adventures of the Little Mermaid	Marina	Fuji TV
1990 - 1991	CB Chara Nagai Go World	Miki Makimura	Bandai Visual
