= Tenko and the Guardians of the Magic =

- Also known as: Saban's Tenko and the Guardians of the Magic
- Developed by: Roger Slifer
- Voices of: Mary Kay Bergman; Webster King; Thomas Lee; Robbie Matthews; Michele Alberts; Sofia Coleman; Derek Patrick; Gloria Bell; Michael Sorich; Pearl Sutton
- Theme music composer: Shuki Levy
- Composer: Michel Dax
- Country of origin: United States
- No. of episodes: 13

Production
- Executive producers: Joel Andryc; Eric S. Rollman
- Producer: Beth Gunn
- Production company: Saban Entertainment

Original release
- Network: Syndication
- Release: September 11, 1995 – 1996

Saban's Tenko and the Guardians of the Magic is an American animated television series that was produced by Saban Entertainment. It centers on the fictional adventures of Japanese real-life magician Princess Tenko, Mariko Itakura. After each episode, she would appear in a live-action segment to perform an illusion or do her "Teach-A-Trick," a segment that teaches the audience a simple magic trick they could perform at home. The show failed to attract an audience and production was cancelled after a single season.

Ownership of the series passed to Disney in 2001 when Disney acquired Fox Kids Worldwide, which also includes Saban Entertainment.

== Plot ==
A young female magician, already an experienced performer, is chosen by an old man named Tenko to come to his magic school and learn real magic. At the school, the young magician befriends a number of other magicians already attending the school and learning magic from Tenko. The new magician begins her training and quickly becomes the best magician at the school.

Impressed by her abilities, the master names the young magician "Princess Tenko" as his successor as the next Tenko and the Master Guardian of the Tenko Box, a magical wardrobe that contains many magic gems known as the Starfire Gems. Two of the most senior students, the twins Jana and Jason watch on. Jana becomes jealous of the newcomer when she is chosen to become Tenko's successor and conspires for rebellion. Jason tries to talk some sense stating that unlike Jana, who had slacked off during training, Mariko is more responsible, and therefore Tenko could trust her, but Jana convinces him to help her and succeed at stealing two of the Starfire Gems for their own use.

When Jana and Jason are discovered, Master Tenko is overcome by their magic. In the scuffle, the Tenko Box is damaged, and the remaining Starfire gems are scattered all over the world and some through time. The twins escape as the new Tenko arrives in an attempt to stop them. Pleased with the young magician's abilities, Master Tenko entrusts Princess Tenko and his remaining students with Starfire Gems he had hidden away and the duty of recovering and protecting the other Starfire Gems from the forces of evil.

== Characters ==
The main protagonists of the series from left to right: Bolt, Steel, Tenko, and Hawk.

- Princess Tenko (voiced by Mary Kay Bergman): As the Master Guardian, the Japanese Tenko is the leader of the show's heroes. She performs a traveling magic show while searching for the displaced Starfire Gems. The ones she personally uses each allow her to summon a ghostly animal companion to help her battle.
- Bolt (voiced by Neal McDonough): Bolt is a white Guardian from Chicago who is the team's joker. His Starfire Gem uses the power to wield a magic sword.
- Hawk: Hawk is a Native American Guardian with a somewhat stereotypical connection to nature. His Starfire Gem uses the power to wield a magical shield that can block most other gems' powers.
- Steel (voiced by Michael Sorich): Steel is an African-American Guardian who is a scholar of history. His Starfire Gem uses the power to fire magical rings which he can throw to capture enemies or create ladders.
- Ali (voiced by Amy Danles): Ali is a hot-headed teenage white girl who feels distant from everyone in her life. After helping Tenko in one adventure, she becomes her apprentice and trains constantly to be a Guardian. In the twelfth episode, she does become a Guardian and earns her own Starfire Gem, but her power is never put to use.
- Shonti: Shonti is an animal trainer hired by Hikita prior to the show. She is technically not a Guardian and does not acquire a gem within the series, but she can perform magic and is part of the team. She is from Africa, though which country is not specified. Like Hawk, she has a connection to nature.
- Jana: Granddaughter of the Master Guardian who came before Hikita, the short-tempered Jana tried to steal the Starfire Gems when Tenko became the new Master Guardian instead of her. It is also presumed that Jana is manipulating Jason into being loyal to her. And yet, after Vell tried to take her life away, Jana helped Tenko to seal the demon away, which means there's still a chance that she might become a guardian with her brother just like she always wanted.
- Jason (voiced by Michael Sorich): Jana's twin brother. He and Tenko have shown signs of being attracted to each other, but his loyalty to his sister is greater, so he follows her orders. Unbeknownst to Jason, Jana is actually manipulating his loyalty by using their close bond to get what she wants.
- Hikita Tenko: The former leader of the Guardians. After he was injured by Jana and Jason he was placed in the Tenko Box and disappeared, but occasionally his spirit appears to Princess Tenko to give her advice.
- Travis Cage: An endangered-species poacher who is interested in money with each endangered animal he captures and trades. He finds the diamond Starfire Gem after failing to bag a gorilla. With the help of Jana and Jason, he kidnaps Ninjara, seeing her as a rare prey, and sets traps for Tenko and the Guardians.
- Vell: An evil industrialist who was logging a rainforest to try to find the emerald Starfire Gem, which would allow him to free a demonic entity imprisoned long ago in another dimension. He is pulled into the demon's other realm for his failure and his ultimate fate is unknown.

== Starfire gems and abilities ==
- Topaz Gem – summons a Golden Lion (Holder: Princess Tenko; wears a matching armor/uniform)
- Rose Quartz Gem – summons the Rose Eagle (Holder: Princess Tenko; wears a matching armor/uniform)
- Sapphire Gem – lets holder breathe underwater and summon the Sapphire Dolphin (Holder: Princess Tenko; wears a matching armor/uniform)
- Garnet Gem – lets the holder to wield a magic sword. (Holder: Bolt)
- Turquoise Gem – gives holder a magical shield (reputedly makes them impervious to the Ruby's powers, but never demonstrated) (Holder: Hawk)
- Quartz Gem – gives the holder magical rings which he/she can throw to capture enemies or create ladders (Holder: Steel)
- Morganite Gem – Unknown (possibly super speed). (Holder: Ali)
- Amber Gem – allows holder the power to shoot fireball projectiles (Holder: Jana)*
- Ruby Gem – creates a mesmer-disk shield that lets holder hypnotize people (Holder: Jason)*
- Opal Gem – Can bring inanimate objects to life. (Holder: Princess Tenko)
- Amethyst Gem – Holds several animated suits of armor. (Holder: Princess Tenko)
- Diamond Gem – can enlarge a creature it is used on, i.e. Ninjara. (Holder: Princess Tenko)
- Pearl Gem – Has the power of flight, used by Tenko to turn her horse Pearl Rider into a pegasus. (Holder: Princess Tenko)
- Onyx Gem – Lets the holder create storms, but carries a curse that if it is not given freely, its power will eventually run out of control. (Holder: Princess Tenko)
- Cat's Eye Gem – Lets the user see anywhere in the world and has limited power to see the future. (Holder: Jana)*
- Emerald Gem – the most dangerous Starfire Gem, allows the holder to free a demonic entity imprisoned long ago in another dimension (Holder: unknown)

Note: Jason and Jana can transform into a two-headed dragon by touching their Starfire Gems together.

== Episodes ==
No.	Title	Written by	Original release date
1	"Let The Magic Begin!"	Roger Slifer	11 September 1995
Tenko saves a child from a burning building and for her bravery is selected by Hikita Tenko to become one of the Guardians of the Magic and his successor. Angered that she wasn't chosen, Jana coerces Jason into helping her steal the Starfire Gems, which Hikita hurls through time to keep them safe.
2	"Through the City Darkly"	Marv Wolfman	18 September 1995
A thug has found a Starfire Gem, but his bag gets mixed up with Ali's, and Jana and Jason come after her to get it. The twins and the Guardians both appeal to Ali to let them help her, and she realizes the Guardians are the ones who really want to help. Ali becomes Tenko's apprentice.
3	"Diamond in the Rough"	Rich Fogel & Mark Seidenberg	25 September 1995
A big game hunter finds a Starfire Gem, and in exchange for it Jana promises to give him the chance to hunt a snow leopard; in particular, Tenko's snow leopard, Ninjara. The Guardians travel to Africa to try to bargain for the gem, and Bolt and Hawk get stuck at customs for the entire show. The hunter's son tells Tenko and Steel what's going on, and after a battle with Jana and Jason the hunter realizes that his son matters more to him than hunting, and gives the gem to Tenko. With the help of the diamond Gem, Ninjara breaks out of her captivity and saves Jason from a raging fire, and the Gem is put into the box for safekeeping.
4	"Strong Medicine, Strong Magic"	Sean Catherine Derek	2 October 1995
Jana poisons Tenko's horse, Pearl-Rider, with a poisoned apple, and seeking a cure Hawk takes her to his tribe's reservation in search of his grandfather the medicine man. Jana and Jason have captured him, but Tenko and Hawk save him and teleport back to the mansion in time to save Pearl-Rider.
5	"The Stone of Destiny"	George Arthur Bloom	9 October 1995
Professor Doole, a teacher of Steel's, is buried in rock when excavating the tomb of King Hepsut, a pharaoh who owned the Star of Destiny (the dialogue calls it the Star, not Stone), which allowed him to see across time and space. Figuring it's another Starfire Gem, the Guardians and Jana and Jason descend on the tomb. Surviving traps and undead mummy guards, the Guardians get the Star of Destiny, but Jason kidnaps Ali, and Tenko is forced to trade them the gem for Ali's safety. The twins use it to the see what the future holds, and see Tenko's wedding. Jana snatches it away before Jason can see who the groom is, but he has a long brown ponytail, like Jason....
6	"Trust and Betrayal"	Douglas Booth	16 October 1995
Jana and Jason find another Starfire Gem, but its energy is unstable and Jason is placed in a coma when he touches it. Jana goes to the Guardians for help saving her brother, and he's put inside the Tenko Box to be healed. Jana then reveals her other face and locks up the Guardians, but Ninjara and Kiddles the monkey manage to get the keys and free the Guardians. Tenko enters the box and brings out Jason who almost reforms, but Jana forces him to join her again and the twins are fought off.
7	"Night of the Dolphin"	Sean Catherine Derek	23 October 1995
Tenko is performing at an aquatic theme park, and meets two of the occupants, a dolphin named Delphy and a young orca named Kaylu who's been kidnapped from his pod. Jana and Jason conspire with the greedy owner of the park to ambush Tenko. During the attack most of the park's occupants are freed into the ocean, ruining the corrupt owner, and Tenko with them. Delphy leads her to a grotto where she finds the sapphire Starfire Gem and learns that Delphy is the dolphin it controls.
8	"The Big Story"	Rich Fogel & Mark Seidenberg	6 November 1995
Bolt falls for Stacy Roberts, a reporter for a show called The Big Story, but Jason hypnotizes her into leading Bolt into a trap so they can steal his Starfire Gem. They also steal the Tenko Box and use it to summon a chimera, but the Guardians manage to drive it away, and Stacy's news camera breaks, so she doesn't get an exclusive of the battle.
9	"Troubled Waters"	Stewart St. John	13 September 1995
Tad Donovan, an old friend of Bolt's, is working with a scientist in a plan to bomb a California fault line to prevent The Big One. Tenko senses another Starfire Gem in the vicinity so the Guardians find it while Jana and Jason try to take advantage of the bombs, because in truth they'll cause a devastating earthquake rather than prevent them. Tenko keeps the bombs from going off just in time.
10	"Will the Real Tenko Please Stand Up?"	Eric Rollman, Jonathan Shneidman & Stewart St. John	TBA
A prince sends his advisors to hire Tenko to perform for him, and he promises to give her a Starfire Gem he owns. Hearing this, Jana pretends to be Tenko and the prince decides to have them compete against each other. When Jana destroys things and Tenko saves the spectators, the prince realizes she really deserves the gem and gives it to the real Tenko.
11	"The Forest Emerald"	Sean Catherine Derek	TBA
Tenko has a dream about being chased into a cave by a villain, and Hikita's spirit tells her to find a purple pouch. After discovering a secret passage in the mansion, they find the purple pouch, which has a map to the resting place of the emerald Starfire Gem. While Bolt, Steel and Ali lead Jana and Jason on a wild goose chase, Tenko and Hawk travel to a rain forest to look for the emerald. The map is stolen by an evil developer named Vell, and he finds the emerald first. Tenko manages to shatter it, but Vell steals half of the part which gives it its magic and escapes.
12	"The Magic Skates"	Michael Maurer & Sean Catherine Derek	TBA
Ali is tired of training as Tenko's apprentice and not being considered responsible enough to do advanced magic. She returns home and meets with an old friend who convinces her to buy a pair of skates. Little does Ali know, now that she has left Tenko's protection, Jana and Jason will do anything to get her skates, which each have half of the morganite Starfire gem. After proving herself to be responsible and capable of using the magic she has learned, Tenko presents Ali with the morganite gem and deems her worthy of becoming a Guardian.
13	"Cry Havoc"	Brooks Wachtel	TBA
Vell joins forces with Jana to steal Tenko's piece of the emerald Starfire Gem, and takes it from her after trapping her in a volcano. Tenko follows them to the ruins of Atlantis, where Vell betrays Jana and uses her life-energy and the emerald to try to free an ancient demon. Jana combines her power with Tenko's to seal the demon away, but doesn't know when to stop and tries to take the emerald even when the cave starts to collapse, burying her. As Jason arrives at the mouth of the cave, an eerie green glow is seen coming from within.

== Home media ==
The first six episodes are available on 3 DVDs in the United Kingdom, released by Boulevard Entertainment.

== Toy line tie-in ==
A line of Tenko toys was produced by Mattel. The dolls were slightly altered designs from the cancelled Wonder Woman and the Star Riders toy line in development during 1992–1993. Some character designs for the Tenko cartoon were based on the Star Riders character designs.
