= Choujinki Metalder =

Japanese science fiction television series

- Also known as: Super Android Metalder
- Genre: Tokusatsu; Superhero fiction Science fiction
- Created by: Saburō Yatsude
- Developed by: Susumu Takaku
- Directed by: Takeshi Ogasawara
- Starring: Akira Senō; Hiroko Aota; Kazuoki Takahashi; Hiroshi Kawai; Toshi Fufuchu; Hana Arashi; Shinji Tōdō
- Voices of: Michirō Iida; Genpei Hayashiya; Takeshi Watabe
- Narrated by: Issei Masamune
- Composer: Seiji Yokoyama
- Country of origin: Japan
- No. of episodes: 39

Production
- Running time: 25 minutes
- Production companies: Toei Company; Asatsu-DK

Original release
- Network: TV Asahi (ANN)
- Release: March 16, 1987 – January 17, 1988

Related
- Jikuu Senshi Spielban; Sekai Ninja Sen Jiraiya

Super Android Metalder (超人機メタルダー, Chōjinki Metarudā) is the sixth and shortest entry of the Metal Hero Series franchise, running from March 16, 1987, to January 17, 1988, for 39 episodes. The series was broadcast on TV Asahi, initially inheriting the same Monday 7:00PM time slot of all the preceding Metal Hero shows for its first 24 episodes before switching to the Sunday 9:30AM slot for the remainder of its run. Metalder bears many similarities to Shotaro Ishinomori's Android Kikaider and Kikaider 01, particularly in its themes, characters, and the hero's costume design. Footage from the show was used in VR Troopers.

For distribution purposes, Toei refers to this television series as simply Metalder.

== Story ==
In 1945, Dr. Ryūichirō Koga designed Metalder as a top-secret weapon for the Japanese Imperial Army for use in the Pacific War, modeling it after his late son, Second Sub-lieutenant Tatsuo Koga. However, the pacifistic Dr. Koga put Metalder to sleep in the Silver Caucus base and left for the United States to work for NASA.

During the 42 years, Dr. Koga's former colleague Kunio Muraki became evil God Neros, the ruler of the Neros Empire which is notorious as a merchant of death. God Neros sends out his massive armies to kill Dr. Kōga, who learned of their organization and returned to Japan to activate Metalder. Koga desperately tries to activate his android creation, who he named Ryūsei Tsurugi, but the android is unable to understand what to do. In order to give Ryusei a "purpose", Koga runs out of the Silver Caucus base, allowing Neros' troops to kill him. Suddenly seeing his creator die, Ryūsei becomes shocked, and soon is beaten by Neros' troops. Ryūsei becomes fueled with rage, evoking the conversion to his true form, the android known as Metalder. After a brief battle with Coolgin (which he loses), Ryūsei goes onward, meeting future friend Mai Ougi.

== Characters ==
=== Metalder ===
Metalder (メタルダー, Metarudā) is a "Choujinki", a powerful war android built by Dr. Koga at the end of World War II originally as a countermeasure against the Americans. He was hidden in a secret base of the Japanese Imperial Army until Dr. Koga activated him years later to fight the Neros Empire. His human guise, Ryusei Tsurugi (剣 流星, Tsurugi Ryūsei), is directly modeled after that of Dr. Koga's son Tatsuo of whom he lost during the war. Whenever his energies reach a peak from rage, with the cry "Enrage!" (怒る!, Ikaru), he transforms into his metallic form. Like Tatsuo, he loves music and plays the saxophone from time to time. His Reflection Circuit gave him the same feelings as humans and a sense of right and wrong. Powered by 'super-gravitational energy', his killing techniques include "Laser Arm", "G-Kick", "Metal Tornado" spinning kick, "Head Crash" ram, "Plasma Punch", "Metal Bomber" punching attack from above, and "1000 Hand Punch". At the end of the series he defeats God Neros but in the process, his super-gravitational energy is severely damaged, as a result whenever he moves longer, he will explode and the world will be destroyed by its impact. With Kita's help, Metalder is spared from destruction but at the cost of his human form and his ability to fight as a Choujinki.

=== Allies ===
- Springer (スプリンガー, Supuringā) is a robot dog that guards the Silver Carcass. He was built by Dr. Koga before Metalder as his "older brother". Capable of human speech, he repairs Metalder and runs the machines inside the Silver Carcass. Springer enjoys watching TV, particularly anime.
- Mai Ougi (仰木 舞, Ōgi Mai) is a tomboyish camerawoman who works for the Weekly Up magazine. She is Metalder's first human friend and constant companion.
- Ben K (ベンK, Benkei) is an armored Sōhei warrior with a large hammer named after the legendary Saitō Musashibō Benkei. As a member of the Armored Army, Ben K wins the honor to hunt down Metalder after defeating Gebaros in the Ghost Bank. He secretly attacks Ryusei by throwing a hatchet at his leg. With an injured leg, Ryusei leaves Mai behind and retreats into the woods. Ben K has the advantage with his mighty hammer, but Metalder manages to store just enough power to destroy Ben K's helmet. However, despite Metalder's wish to kill him, he spares Ben K's life upon realizing he was a human. After that, Ben K abandons the Empire. He returns in Episode 13 to help Metalder save Hidouman's captives, the miner and his family. He is killed by the Shadow Light Fighters, whom he simultaneously defeats. Like the legend, Ben K dies standing with arrows in his body.
- Barlock (バーロック, Bārokku) is an athlete dressed in blue-green tights and a silver mask resembling a Greek warrior. His outfit fits the theme of a scuba diver. He wields a scythe and chain in his right hand and a clawed gauntlet on his left hand. Barlock was a former decathlon athlete who sabotaged his rival's chance to enter the Olympics. After his rival commits suicide, he feels shame at his cowardice and seeks out challengers to prove himself by becoming a member of the Armored Army. In Episode 8, he battles with Hedogross in the Ghost Bank for the chance to fight Metalder, but loses. He later appears and snags Hedogross' hostage to use as bait to draw Metalder into battle. He is defeated, but not destroyed by Metalder's Laser Arm attack. Redeemed by fighting honorably, he sacrifices himself by taking a tank blast that was meant for Metalder, and possibly the hostage, thus killing him.
- Madonna (マドンナ) is the only female Light Fighter. She's also special for working specifically and only in Coolgin's Armored Army. Originally seen as a slave like Wisdom, she proved to be a strong and brave fighter when she protected an exhausted fellow slave from Wogger's blows. Coolgin, having watched the altercation, was impressed by her combat skills and promoted her to Light Fighter. Before becoming a slave, she was a tennis player who was "recruited" by The Secretaries to work as a slave by rebuilding damaged robots for the Empire. She had a sister whom Metalder rescued and took to a hospital after the girl appeared injured to him. Once promoted, Wogger gave her a flat-bladed sword with which to battle, as well as the new name/title of Madonna and freedom from her slave rank. Also ala Wisdom, she faked being a damsel in distress on the beach, only to turn on and attack Metalder after he tried to help her. Metalder recognized her from her sister's picture and tried to talk some sense into her by telling her that her sister was alive, which caused her to leave the battle. She returned to Wogger after her battle with Metalder and Wogger implanted a device into her armor to help her in her next battle with him. In reality, unknown by her, it was a detonation device. She was then used a decoy, faking a needed rescue, only to be saved by Metalder, luring him into a trap. Once he discovered it was a trap, Metalder used his Laser Arm attack to destroy her weapon and with Springer's help, learned of the bomb in her armor and chucked it out of her before it could harm them. Upon learning that she had been used, and that Metalder was right all along, she attacked Wogger long enough for Metalder to escape. Afterwards, she left the Empire and with Metalder's help was reunited with her sister in the hospital.
- Rhapsody (ラプソディ, Rapusodi) is a peaceful robot of the Robotic Warrior Army with a Stradivarius violin. However, when this robot is upgraded by God Neros and plays his violin, Metalder's circuits go haywire and seem to paralyze his suit. Rhapsody was originally an un ranked and friendly robot, like the repair robots, before being upgraded/promoted by Emperor God Neros. He battles Tagsky and Tagsron in the Ghost Bank and wins the chance to fight Metalder. In the battle with the brothers, he breaks both their weapons. Fighting Metalders, he is struck by Metalder's Laser Arm attack, which seems to turn him back into a peaceful violinist. This does not last, as Darbarbo soon appears and blasts him, causing him to fall over and explode. Both Metalder and the Neros Empire remember his memory and musical talents. In Episode 19, it is revealed that he has been rebuilt and is no longer at Fierce Fighter status. He appears when a little girl becomes lost inside the Ghost Bank. He manages to protect her from the other robots and mutants by hiding her behind his cape until Chuubo discovers them together. He also plays the little girl a song for which she gives him a flower. After helping Metalder and Top Gunder rescue the girl, he leaves the Empire. Rhapsody has decided to stay good and is last seen working for what appears to be a carnival/boardwalk by entertaining patrons with his musical talents. He appears again in Episode 31, still working as a peaceful carnival entertainer.
- Wisdom (ウィズダム, Wizudamu): A slave married to Hedogross, who later gives birth to Hedogross Jr. She has both a humanoid and a mutant of indeterminate description form. When she first appears in Episode 9, she gives her husband her earring to hold during battle. When he is destroyed, she plucks the earring from his remains and vows revenge on Metalder, getting her chance in Episode 12. She uses her human guise to portray a damsel in distress for Metalder to rescue before revealing her true form and attacking. She flees when her labor pains become too intense. Back at the lab, Metalder learns she is just a pregnant slave. He saves her from Galador, who attacked her because she failed to defeat Metalder and ruined their plan. After Metalder rescues her, he returns her earring which she dropped fighting him, and allows her to escape. Sometime before Episode 15, she bears Hedogross Jr. When Junior attacks Metalder, she becomes angry and informs him that Metalder had saved her life. She tries to steer her son away from the Empire, but in vain. Wisdom is later taken hostage by the Empire, but is rescued by her son. She helps both he and Metalder fight off the Empire before leaving the Neros Empire with him.
- Hedogross Jr. (ヘドグロス ジュニア, Hedogurosu Junia) is the son of Hedogross and Wisdom. Hedogross Jr. is a green mutant with silver hair who could project three long claws on each hand. Like his father, Hedogross Jr. can dissolve into slime and takes human form like his mother. He first appears in Episode 12 in Wisdom's memory/imagination as a baby. In Episode 15 he is determined to exact revenge on Metalder for his father and wants to take his father's place. Hedogross Jr. is recruited by Galdos and given status after proving himself. He is assigned to kill Metalder by God Neros after thrashing numerous members of the Monster Army in the Ghost Bank. However, during mid-battle with the Metal Hero, Metalder saves him from falling off a cliff. Metalder tries to reason with him. After seeing his mother held hostage, Hedogross Jr. finally realizes God Neros is the true villain, and the two fight off Bridy, Gamadone, Damnen, Zakembor and the Shadow Light Fighters together.
- Dog-Gyaran (ドグギャラン, Dogugyaran) is the end result of Geldring's attempt to revitalize his ranks. Originally a stray German Shepherd named George, he is captured by God Neros' secretaries and mutated into a member of the Monster Army via a special booth-looking machine. During the battle with Metalder, its memories are restored by the Saint Bernard belonging to Mai and Kita, who had earlier shown it kindness. When it refuses to follow orders and destroy Metalder, Geldring kills him by spraying him with toxic foam.
- Hakko Kita (北 八荒, Kita Hakkō) is a Grand Prix motorcyclist who was originally head of a motorcycle gang. He first appears in episode 16, where he meets Ryusei and Mai on a photo shoot for a new motorcycle magazine, and gets involved in the fighting. Calling himself the 'Neros Hunter', Kita saw himself as Mai's bodyguard and has feelings for her. Though Kita was willing to aide Ryusei's war against the Neros Empire, his efforts almost always result in a comedic or humiliating defeat.
- Top Gunder (トップガンダー, Toppugandā) is a soldier who initially serves the Robotic Warrior Army. Top Gunder is a lone gunman in black tights and a single red-eye who believes in fair play. He was built after the manga character Golgo 13. Though he originally intended to kill Metalder in a one-on-one fight, Top Gunder later gained respect for Metalder and became close allies with him. In Episode 33, a fake robotic Top Gunder was created to bait Metalder into a rescue, as the real Top Gunder had been captured by the armies of God Neros. The fake robot attacked Metalder shortly after being rescued, only to be shot and destroyed by the real Top Gunder when Crosslander exposed the deception. Also, in Episode 33, Top Gunder revealed that he, like Zargen, was capable of dreaming. He helped Metalder to bring down the Ghost Bank in Episodes 35-37 only to be killed by God Neros who was in Coolgin's old armor.
- Dr. Ryuichiro Koga (古賀 竜一郎, Koga Ryūichirō) is a leading authority in Robotic Engineering and the man who created Metalder. After World War II, Dr. Koga went to America and became a staff member at NASA. He returned to Japan when he learned of the existence of the Neros Empire and its ties to his past actions, prompting him to activate Metalder. Battered from Strobe's attempt on his life, Koga makes it to his secret laboratory and activates the android from his rest. Soon after, in order to give Ryusei a sense of purpose, Koga allows himself to be killed by Chuubo and the Neros Empire members at the end of the first episode.
- 2nd Sub-lieutenant Tatsuo Koga (古賀 竜夫, Koga Tatsuo) is Dr. Koga's only son, whom Metalder was modeled after. He died in October 1944 as the first member of the Kamikaze Special Attack Squads. He loved music and played the violin with the potential to be a great violinist.
- Shingo Ougi (仰木 信吾, Ōgi Shingo) is Mai's father, who lives in Washington DC as a news reporter. As a favor to Mai, he investigates Dr. Koga's past and learns about God Neros' identity. In Episode 35, he is abducted by the Secretaries and taken to the Ghostbank. In Episode 36, he is brainwashed by God Neros and forced to wear the armor of the late Tagsky to battle Metalder. Shingo becomes free from the brainwashing when Metalder strikes him with his Laser Arm.

=== Neros Empire ===
The Neros Empire (ネロス帝国, Nerosu Teikoku) is the underbelly of the Kirihara Concern (桐原コンツェルン, Kirihara Kontserun) Corporation. Located at Shinjuku, it covertly controls all activities of the world's criminal organizations, including terrorists and finance. The Neros Empire's goal is world domination with economic and military might. The leaders meet at the Ghost Bank, a ring of gates containing key army officers surrounding God Neros' throne. The area enclosed by the gates and throne serves as both an arena and as a strategy room. Divided into four Units: Armored Army, Robotic Warrior Army, Monster Army, and Armament Army.

- God Neros (ゴッドネロス, Goddonerosu) is the leader of the Neros Empire. God Neros has a god complex and wants to rule the world through the arms market. His original identity is that of Kunio Muraki (村木 國夫, Muraki Kunio), a former technical major within the Japanese Army who assisted Dr. Koga in the development of the Choujinki project. Testing on prisoners of war led to Muraki's arrest and supposed execution at Singapore, but he managed to fake his death by bribing prison officials. Muraki escapes to America where he joins several criminal syndicates, eventually killing their leaders and stealing their riches. In addition, he undergoes plastic surgery to alter his appearance, making himself appear much more youthful than he really is. He then builds the Kirihara Concern under the name of Gozo Kirihara (桐原 剛造, Kirihara Gōzō). As far as the public knows, Gozo is a philanthropist at the head of an international financial empire. When entering the Ghost Bank, Kirihara undergoes a grotesque transformation revealing his true cyborg form as God Neros. He has Coolgin switch places with him, faking his death and manages to kill Top Gunder. In battle, God Neros can throw a sword like a spear, sprout tentacles from his throne to electrocute and bind opponents, blast lasers from the sphere on his helmet, and create/blast electrical energy from his hands. God Neros was beheaded at the end of the series by Metalder with the Laser Arm attack.
- Beautiful Secretary K (美人秘書K, Bijin Hisho Kē) and Beautiful Secretary S (美人秘書S, Bijin Hisho Esu) are Gozo's spies. They are as ruthless and cruel as their boss. S dresses in a black leotard and wears her hair tied behind her head. K has green leotards and lets her hair drape to the right side of her head. Both killed by Top Gunder standing as final guardians of God Neros.
- Coolgin (クールギン, Kūrugin) is a first-class armored strategist, swordsman and God Neros' second-in-command who leads the Armored Army. Though confused by his master's fear for Koga, Coolgin realizes why when Metalder reveals himself. However, Coolgin manages to defeat Metalder with one sword attack during their first confrontation. Coolgin had another brief rematch with Metalder in the Ghost Bank in Episode 19, but Metalder escaped before they could finish. In Episode 26, he gained yet another chance to fight Metalder one-on-one but lost. Underneath his mask, he looks exactly like Kirihara; the purpose is so that he can be God Neros' shadow to create confusion. When the Ghost Bank self-destructs in Episode 37, Metalder believes he has defeated God Neros, but Coolgin and God Neros had switched places shortly before the battle. Coolgin attempts to kill Metalder and Top Gunder by destroying the Ghost Bank, but this plan backfires as Coolgin finds himself bound to the throne by electrical tentacles. Unable to escape, Coolgin accepts his fate and perishes in the explosion. Coolgin reappears as a ghost in the final episode. When Metalder stabs his fiery life force, he vanishes forever.
- Valsky (バルスキー, Barusukī) is a silver robot and leader of the Robotic Warrior Army with a golden gear on his forehead that fires beams and yellow and black stripes on the chest and forearm armor. He can also blast energy from his eye slots, as well as blast missiles from his knuckles when he makes a fist. He is proud of his army and does not move away from it. He fights for his fellow robots and praises them at every turn. In Episode 11, he leads his fellow androids and the Armament Army in an effort to capture the escaped Bigwayne. In Episode 36, he loses to Metalder, though he manages to survive, even after Metalder knocks him into the water. In Episode 38, he returns and gains the ability to assume the forms and use the abilities of his troops, via Lortail's help. Valsky transforms into Gochak, Jars, Bigwayne, Crosslander, and Galdos. But despite being defeated by Metalder's Laser Arm and G-Kick attacks, Valsky seemed impressed by Metalder and made peace with him before he explodes.
- Geldring (ゲルドリング, Gerudoringo) is a green muscular beast with a skull-like head encased in a clear egg-shaped dome that resembles a mutant turtle. As the leader of the Monster Army, Geldring's other abilities include teleportation, shooting goo out of his fingers, producing electricity from his hands, breathing fire, and releasing vine-like appendages from his mouth. He has the most opportunities to battle Metalder personally but fails. His personality is dirty, treacherous, envious, cowardly, and accommodating. He frequently criticizes the other armies and often takes credit for work accomplished by his fellow mutants. In Episode 9, he teases and taunts Hedogross for his love of Wisdom and soon prompts the other mutants to do the same. In Episode 15, despite Hedogross Jr. fitting into his rank, he does not want the young mutant to represent the Monster Army. In Episode 32, he learns of a rare plant that enhances those who consume it with great power. He puts this newfound strength to use against Metalder and withdraw. In this battle, Geldring reveals the ability to blast lasers from his eyes as well as breathe fire. In Episode 35 to battle alongside Bankora and is finally destroyed in this match, by Metalder's Laser Arm, turning into a puddle of slime.
- Dranger (ドランガー, Dorangā) is red and silver in color, wielding a tachi (longsword) in his right hand and a weaponized shield on his left. Dranger has blades, guns, and lights mounted on his ears. He supervised the Armament Army in carrying out the weapons test in Episode 20. In Episode 19, he fights Metalder in the Ghost Bank. He led the Armament Army ambush, when Metalder and Top Gunder emerge from the ruined Ghost Bank in Episode 37. He stands in disbelief after seeing his entire army wiped out within moments. He loses to Metalder after being struck twice by the Laser Arm attack.
- The Shadow Light Fighters (軽闘士影, Keitōshi Kage) are a group of grunts trained in ninjutsu.

==== Four Armies of the Neros Empire ====
The Four Armies of the Neros Empire (ネロス帝国軍4軍団, Nerosu Teikokugun Yon Gundan) are God Neros' primary fighters. Each is led by a "Victorious Saint" (凱聖, Gaisei): Coolgin, Valsky, Geldring, and Dranger. There are nine ranks beneath Victorious Saint. From highest to lowest:

- Brave General (豪将, Gōshō): Tagsky, Tagsron, Galdos, Bridy, and Megadron.
- Violent Spirit (暴魂, Bōkon): Chuubo, Crosslander, Bankora, Darbarbo, and Agmis.
- Heroic Fighter (雄闘, Yūtō): Wogger, Jars, Gamadone, and Barbery.
- Explosive Fighter (爆闘士, Bakutōshi): Galador, Robinken, Gochak, and Damnen.
- Furious Fighter (激闘士, Gekitōshi): Jamune, Gebaros, Zakembor, and Strobe.
- Fierce Fighter (烈闘士, Rettōshi): Zargen, and Bulchek.
- Strong Fighter (強闘士, Kyōtōshi): Lortail
- Medium Fighter (中闘士, Chūtōshi): Mukimukiman, and Fuufuuchu.
- Light Fighter (軽闘士, Keitōshi): Goblit, and Dedemos.

Members that are ranked below from Keitōshi through Gekitōshi are named after the severity levels of earthquakes in Japanese (i.e. Gekitōshi is derived from gekishin (激震), a severe earthquake).

===== Armored Army =====
The Armored Army (ヨロイ軍団, Yoroi Gundan) is a group consisting of armored cyborgs that have been enhanced and humans wearing armor. Metalder was always careful not to deliver fatal blows to the human half of the Armored Army. In the final episode, the helmets of every member (except for Ben K) were revived to prevent Metalder from reaching God Neros. The heads crash into a wall and explode to damage Metalder.

- Tagsky (タグスキー, Tagusukī) and Tagsron (タグスロン, Tagusuron) are the "Tag Brothers", two armored human swordsmen. Tagsky wears red and yellow armor and is an expert with the sword while Tagsron wears green and black armor and is a master of the naginata. Both brothers fight Metalder together and separately. They first appear in battle in Episode 7 where they dispose of some double agents in the Neros Empire and then attack Metalder together. They demonstrate their combined attack on the Emperor on a repair robot outside the Ghost Bank, destroying it. Tagsky and Tagsron are defeated when Metalder tricks them into stabbing each other, causing them to retreat. In Episode 10, they appear again. This time, they fight Rhapsody in the Ghost Bank and are non-fatally defeated when he breaks both of their weapons. In the movie, Tagsky, and Tagsron are defeated by Metalder's Laser Arm. These two returned in Episode 23, during the Four Army relay race. Tagsron fights Metalder with the Shadow Light Fighters, in Episode 26, and is defeated by Metalder's Metal Tornado Move. Tagsky weeps at learning of his brother's defeat and then seeks vengeance. Before he can do so, he is defeated after landing on a landmine in Episode 27. Although Tagsky is killed earlier, his armor is given to Mai's brainwashed father Shingo Ouji to wear in Episode 36. Tagsky's armor is scrapped afterward.
- Chuubo (チューボ, Chūbo) is an armored samurai-like cyborg and master of the katana and the hook. He led FuuFuuChu, Mukimukiman, Wogger, Gebaros, and Zakembor into killing Dr. Koga and fighting Metalder in his first battle. He fought Metalder for a second time in Episode 19, only to be defeated by his Metal Tornado move. He is restored soon afterward, only to finally be destroyed by Metalder's Laser Arm attack in Episode 37, standing as the final guardian of God Neros.
- Wogger (ウォッガー, Woggā) is an armored cyborg and master of the spear. His entire body looks like a collection of grey tubes. He accompanies Chuubo in his attack on Dr. Koga, which also leads to his first battle with Metalder. In Episode 14 he gains a chance to battle Metalder again, though this time alongside Madonna. He is the first to admit being impressed by Madonna's battle skills and the first to inform her about her promotion. In battle, he discharges electrical energy from the tip of his spear, as well as manipulates enough wind to generate a sandstorm. He imprisons Metalder in a deep ditch by using this sandstorm attack and tries to bury him alive, with the help of some projecting and imprisoning bars. After escaping from the trap, Metalder uses one of the bars as a weapon and causes Wogger to lose his footing. In a classic feint, he calls out to Metalder for assistance. When Metalder approaches him, Wogger unleashes more aggressive attacks, until Metalder realizes he was a lost cause and uses his Laser Arm attack to slice Wogger in half. In Episode 25, Wogger II first appears. He is summoned to revenge on the Gorigons from destroying the lab to create a capsule with Neros' evil chemicals to make animals grow into ferocious animals to attack humans. He is defeated by Metalder during the hunt when Metalder uses his Metal Tornado Move on him. He was restored and makes his final appearance, in battle, in Episode 37 while searching the Kirihara building for Metalder and Top Gunder. He is destroyed for good by Metalder's Laser Arm attack.
- Galador (ガラドー, Garadō) is a cyborg ninja master of magic, equipped with dirty tricks including explosive cards, shurikens, and self-duplication. He also seems to be able to send Metalder into another dimension and throw/summon fire. In Episode 12, he battles Metalder one-on-one, bringing with him the Shadow Light Fighters. He also attacks Wisdom in that episode when she fails to defeat Metalder. In Episode 15, he is assigned by Coolgin to capture Wisdom. He appears in Episode 23, during the Four Army relay race. In Episode 24, he uses all his magical talents to fight Metalder, until he is defeated by Metalder's Laser Arm attack. Restored to full function, he appears in Episode 33 but loses to Top Gunder during an interrupted training exercise. He appears in Episode 37, his final appearance, after being restored, while searching the Kirihara building for Metalder and Top Gunder. He is destroyed for good by Metalder's Laser Arm.
- Robinken (ロビンケン, Robinken) is a camouflage-garbed cyborg commando. He appears in episode 14, falsely attacking Madonna so that Metalder would come to her rescue and fall into a trap. He appears in Episode 14 performing a sneak attack against Metalder. He appears in Episode 19, alongside Chuubo, Jamune, and various members of the Armament Army. Robinken has the rare mentality of not caring about rank. During the Four Army relay race in Episode 23, he captures a camera-toting youth wandering in the area reserved for the race. Robinken leads Metalder along a circuitous path to the Four Army finish line. When Metalder escapes with the hostage, Robinken gives chase, coaxing Metalder into a trap-laden course of his design. The traps ultimately failed and Robinken is destroyed by Metalder's Laser Arm attack.
- Jamune (ジャムネ, Jamune) is a cyborg boxer with expensive upper body padding. In battle, he can launch his boxing glove-shaped fists at his opponents. In Episode 8, he is Barlock's lackey, helping him retrieve the scientist hostage that the Neros Empire had taken. He appears in episode 14, falsely attacking Madonna so that Metalder would come to her rescue and fall into a trap, and sneaks an attack on Metalder later. He also appears alongside Chuubo in Episode 19. In Episode 21, he battles Metalder one-on-one. Metalder defeats him by discovering the weak spot in his legs and knees. Metalder defeats Jamune with his Metal Tornado move, which knocks Jamune into a lake and out of the battle. He was restored to full function in Episode 33 but was defeated by Top Gunder during an interrupted training exercise. In Episode 37, he was restored and made his final appearance while searching the Kirihara building for Metalder and Top Gunder. He was destroyed for good by a fatal shot from Top Gunder.
- Mukimukiman (ムキムキマン) and Fuufuuchu (フーフーチュウ, Fūfūchu) are comical wrestling rejects. Mukimukiman has a muscular build and is dressed in white battle gear with white hair; Fuufuuchu is obese and wears a large black helmet and a red vest. In the first episode, they fight Metalder during his first battle and are pummeled and tossed aside. The characters were both killed by Top Gunder standing as final guardians of God Neros in episode 37.

===== Robotic Warrior Army =====
The Robotic Warrior Army (戦闘ロボット軍団, Sentō Robotto Gundan) consists of androids that make up the Neros Army. They were developed from the same technology used to create Metalder.

- Galdos (ガルドス, Garudosu) is a robotic boxer with grey, floormat-like plating on his head, shoulders, and thighs. Galdos can discharge electricity through tentacles that sprout from his forehead. In episode 6, Metalder destroys him. He is rebuilt again, appearing in Episode 15, when he leads the initial attack on Metalder until Hedogross Jr. appears. He appears in Episode 23 during the Four Army Relay Race. In Episode 30, he leads the initial scheme. During this battle, Galdos reveals he can launch/detonate warheads from a special glove, blast electricity from the slot on his forehead, and blast energy from a clawed/rod-like device he conceals in his chest. He is destroyed in battle, during the same episode, by Metalder's Laser Arm attack.
- Crosslander (クロスランダー, Kurosurandā) is a VIP assassin dressed in red spandex with white armor. He fancies himself as one of the best, but has ideals on morality very different from Top Gunder's, who he succeeded in the army. A master marksman who wields twin pistols, he worked with American terrorist organizations, killing government officials and receiving a promotion from Explosive Fighter to Violent Spirit before coming to Japan to kill Metalder and deal with Top Gunder. He also obtains a handgun custom-made for battling Metalder. Crosslander loses his first encounter with Top Gunder, but in their second encounter, he defeats and damages the traitor. He originally wore a winged snake ornament on his forehead, but Metalder damaged it during their first encounter. His second, upgraded head is also damaged, this time by Top Gunder, even though it was equipped with a secret blaster that Top Gunder also damages. In Episode 23, he hides in the tall grass near the finish line of the Four Army relay race and shoots Strobe down each time he tries to become airborne. He fights Top Gunder and Metalder again and is destroyed by Metalder's Laser Arm attack in Episode 33.
  - Goblit (ゴブリット, Goburitto) and Dedemos (デデモス, Dedemosu) are Crosslander's assistants. Both are Light Fighters. Goblit is black and silver and armed with a bayonet while Dedemos was blue with horns and uses a handgun and a drill. Goblit and Dedemos are seen in Episode 19, when they battle Metalder in the Ghost Bank. They appear again, alongside Jars and Gebaros in Episode 22. In Episode 23, these two both appeared in the Four Army relay race and in Episode 30, to help Galdos. In Episode 35, they appear one last time in battle with Geldring, assisting him, only to be destroyed together by Top Gunder.
- Jars (ジャース, Jāsu) is a shark-headed fighter in white tights with twin shoulder cannons and four cannons on his upper arms. In Episode 11, he rats out Gochak when the robot helps Bigwayne escape. In Episode 15, he fights Metalder as part of the Empire's initial assault that day. He also attacks Metalder briefly in the Ghost Bank in Episode 19. In Episode 22, he battles Metalder and leads the day's attack. He is accompanied by Goblit, Dedemos, and Gebaros. Metalder's Metal Tornado move defeats him. He is restored to full function in Episode 33 when he is defeated by Top Gunder during an interrupted training exercise. He is presumably rebuilt/restored soon afterwards, appearing in the background of Episode 36 when he is destroyed for good by a blast from Top Gunder.
- Gochak (ゴチャック, Gochakku) is a silver wrestler called to defeat Metalder, after Barbery fails, in Episode 2. His signature move is putting his opponents in headlocks and twisting their heads off, which he demonstrates to the Emperor, in the Ghost Bank, on Damnen. Metalder was losing in battle against him, but managed to gather his last bit of power to crack Gochak's face. Metalder snaps off Gochak's arms and tears off his head. After being beheaded, Gochak sprouted a cannon head. Metalder destroys Gochak for good with a Laser Arm, but collapses after the fight. Gochak was presumably rebuilt, as he reappears in Episode 11 when he tries to help the rebellious Bigwayne escape from the Robotic Warrior Army and the Armored Army. Jars rats him out to Valsky and he is chained up by the others for treason. He escapes too late to help Bigwayne. He turns Bigwayne's spot of destruction into a memorial mound. In Episode 15, he joins Galdos' group during the initial attack on Metalder. In Episode 19, he attacks Metalder in the Ghost Bank. He is decapitated by a blast from Top Gunder in Episode 36.
- Gebaros (ゲバローズ, Gebarōzu) is silver with thick thighs, high jumping ability, and a featureless black faceplate. He can turn his right hand and forearm into a sword blade and his left hand into pincer claws. He accompanies Chuubo to kill Dr. Koga and fight Metalder. He fights Ben K for the chance to fight Metalder. Ben K smashes his robotic head open with his giant hammer, resulting in a destructive loss. This damage was presumably fixed, as he appears in Episode 11. In Episode 15, he joins Galdos' group during the initial attack on Metalder. He also attacks Metalder in the Ghost Bank, in Episode 19. In Episode 22, he participates in the Four Army relay race. In Episode 36, he battles alongside Valsky, but is destroyed by Metalder's Laser Arm attack.
- Zargen (ザーゲン, Zāgen) is a Grim Reaper-themed fighter with a sickle blade in place of a left hand. In Episode 15, he joins Galdos' group during the initial attack on Metalder. In Episode 18, he had a dream in which Metalder brings down the Ghost Bank. Zargen's scheme to prevent that involves the public abduction of a scientist transporting a briefcase containing valuable information. Metalder takes the bait and retrieves the briefcase. The scientist was a fake, however, but the bomb inside the case fails to destroy Metalder. Before his next battle with Metalder, Zargen asks God Neros to implant him with an explosive device, in order to guarantee his victory. If Metalder struck him directly in close combat, the bomb would destroy them both. During the battle, he lodges his arm blade into Metalder's right shoulder and attempts to finish the task with an electric discharge from the spikes on his head. To Zargen's surprise, Metalder severs his own arm to put distance between them. Metalder then throws his severed arm at Zargen's torso, triggering the bomb and destroying him.
- Lortail (ローテール, Rōtēru) is a white-colored female robot. She aids Valsky before his final battle with Metalder in Episodes 36 and 38. For most of the series, she remains a background character and does not gain her first real mission until Episode 36 when she is chosen to analyze and store all of the data of the robots' fights. It seems she has deep feelings for Valsky and plans to use the uploaded information for/on him so he can defeat Metalder. She manages to successfully transfer the data/her spirit into Valsky after taking a fatal blow from Metalder's G-Kick in Episode 38.

===== Monster Army =====
The Monster Army (モンスター軍団, Monsutā Gundan) is composed of genetically altered-engineered animal mutants. After being killed, they tend to melt into a puddle of green slime:

- Bridy (ブライディ, Buraidi) is a white-furred wolf creature who gains a detachable spider-like parasite on his back. Bridy is extremely ferocious and uses his claws and fangs to attack Metalder. Bridy can shoot webbing to bind his victims. He is among the monsters sent to capture Top Gunder. In Episode 15, he presents Wisdom as a hostage as well as leading the Monster Army and the Shadow Light Fighters into fighting Metalder and Hedogross Jr. In Episode 19, he fought Metalder and Springer in the Ghost Bank. At one point during that battle, Springer bites him, once freed of imprisonment. He battles and bites Metalder in Episode 23, frying his circuitry. During that same episode, he participates in the Four Army relay race, which the Monster Army wins through heavy cheating. In Episode 28 he reveals he can launch his claws like sharp missiles as well as shapeshift into a humanoid form via the power of a special diamond. He was thought defeated in Episode 28, melting into a puddle of slime. Restored, he appears in Episode 32. He appears with his parasite in Episode 34 when Metalder learns of this weakness and kills the parasite during their final battle with his Laser Arm attack. This kills Bridy and he dissolves into slime.
- Bankora (バンコーラ, Bankōra) is a grey-skinned arthropod of indeterminate species/turtle-like monster with white fangs on his chest and legs, and a third arm on his back. He can spew acidic saliva from his mouth and he can teleport. In Episode 5, he is chosen by Geldring to battle Top Gunder in the Ghost Bank. He loses, but survives by forfeiting. He is one of the monsters sent to capture Top Gunder. He later appeared to snag a hostage for Hedogross. He fights Metalder and Springer in the Ghost Bank, only to be viciously attacked and bitten by Springer. He competes in the Four Army relay race in Episode 23. During the battle in Episode 35, he fights alongside Geldring. He is eventually destroyed for good when Metalder binds him with his own arm and then sends him flying with his G-Kick, causing him to collapse and explode.
- Gamadone (ガマドーン, Gamadōn) is a brown-skinned electric eel/crab/jellyfish monster of indeterminate species with antennae and jellyfish-like tentacles on his wrists that electrocute enemies. He can also produce green slime on his tongue and spit it at opponents, as well as turning his right hand into a crab-like claw and breathing fire. In Episode 4, he is injured by Metalder when the hero yanks out one of his internal organs and knocks him into the water. He survives and is seen fighting Hedogross Jr. in the Ghost Bank in Episode 15. In Episode 17, he kidnaps Mai to lure Metalder to him and tries to have sex with her. He then battles Metalder again and is destroyed by his Laser Arm attack.
- Damnen (ダムネン, Damunen) is a red-eyed grasshopper/lizard of inderminate species-like mutant. He fights Gochak for the privilege of fighting Metalder in Episode 2, but loses when his head was twisted backwards by Gochak. Battling Gochak, Damnen reveals he can blast lightning-bolt like lasers from his eyes. Even though he loses to Gochak, he survives. He appears in Episode 5 with Zakembor to spy on Top Gunder. Both are caught and punished by Valsky and Geldring. He is one of the monsters hunting Top Gunder. In Episode 8, he helps Hedogross fight Metalder. Damnen is badly injured fighting Hedogross Jr. in the Ghost Bank in Episode 15. In Episode 19, he fights Metalder in the Ghost Bank. In Episode 32, he appears alongside Geldring in the hunt for the rare plant. He is destroyed when Metalder kicks him off a cliff and explodes after landing at the bottom of the quarry.
- Zakembor (ザケムボー, Zakemubō) is a red-eyed cicada-like mutant. He can emit sonic waves by flapping his wings and spit a green, acid-like liquid. He accompanies Chuubo who kills Dr. Koga and first fights Metalder. He and Damnen sneak away to spy on Top Gunder in Episode 5. Both are caught and punished by Valsky and Geldring for sneaking off. In Episode 8, he helps Hedogross battle Metalder. Zakembor fights Hedogross Jr. in the Ghost Bank in Episode 15, and is badly injured. Later, he fights Metalder and Hedogross Jr. again and is destroyed by the latter.

==== Armament Army ====
The Armament Army (機甲軍団, Kikō Gundan) consists of walking arsenal robots.

- Megadron (メガドロン, Megadoron) is a humanoid tank robot with a circular head flanked by twin shoulder cannons. He also has cannons for fingers. He appears during the hunt for Bigwayne in Episode 11 as well as assisting Chuubo in Episode 19. In Episode 20, after the weapons test, he formulates the plan to use the Armament Army's prototype machine against Metalder. He appears during the Four Army Relay Race in Episode 23, and again in Episode 24 helping to blast Metalder during his fight with Galador. He is destroyed alongside Bulchek in Episode 37.
- Darbarbo (ダーバーボ, Dābābo) is a humanoid rocket silo. He has missile launchers on his chest and shoulders. In Episode 8, he trains with the other members of the Empire. In Episode 9, he and Bulchek interfere in Hedogross' battle by firing on him and Metalder. In Episode 10, he destroys Rhapsody after the violinist fails to destroy Metalder. He appears in Episode 11 during the hunt for Bigwayne and again in Episode 19 as a backup to Chuubo. In episode 20, he acted as controller of the artillery robot and is used by Metalder to destroy it shortly thereafter. He gets rebuilt and appears in Episode 23, during the Four Army Relay Race. In Episode 24 he helps even the odds during Metalder's clash with Galador. In episode 37, he is destroyed by the second volley fired by Metalder, after the Ghost Bank had collapsed.
- Agmis (アグミス, Agumisu) is a humanoid torpedo robot. It is mobile and red and grey. He is armed with a spear gun. In Episode 4, he self-destructs in an attempt to blow up Metalder on a boat. He was presumably rebuilt as he appears briefly in Episode 11, during the hunt for Bigwayne. He takes over for Bulchek midway through the relay race in Episode 23 but has some difficulty, as he is better suited for water than land. He is destroyed with Darbarbo, in Metalder's second volley, after the Ghost Bank collapses in Episode 37.
- Barbery (バーベリィ, Bāberi) is a humanoid helicopter. He shoots explosive missiles from his wrists. His first encounter with Metalder in Episode 2 results in a mid-air collision which damages him considerably. Barbery is spared by God Neros and ordered to be repaired. He usually appears alongside Strobe in battle and missions. He is destroyed in mid-air by Top Gunder in Episode 37.
- Strobe (ストローブ, Sutorōbu)is a humanoid jet plane. He shoots exploding missiles from his wings and is often sent on missions/appears alongside Barbery. In Episode 23, he uses his air superiority to assist Bulchek, Agmis, and Megadron by carrying them across difficult sections of the course. He is destroyed in mid-flight by Top Gunder in Episode 37.
- Bulchek (ブルチェック, Buruchekku) is a humanoid tank. He has a long cannon-like nose that can launch artillery. In Episode 8, he trains with fellow members of the Empire. In Episode 9, alongside Darbarbo, he blasts Hedogross and Metalder while they battle together. He appears in Episode 11 during the hunt for Bigwayne and again in Episode 19 as a backup to Chuubo. He discovers the boxful of abandoned puppies in Episode 20 during the weapons test cleanup and protects them, even when they are designated as bait because he loves all animals. While attempting to rescue a puppy wandering amid the mines, Bulchek accidentally triggers one and is heavily damaged, but succeeds in protecting the puppy, and Metalder leaves them in Mai's care. He is the Armament Army's first choice for the Four Army relay race in Episode 23. In Episode 24, he helps Galador by blasting at Metalder during their scuffle. He is finally destroyed in Episode 37, alongside Megadron, during Metalder's first volley.

===== Others =====
- Hidouman (ヒドーマン, Hidōman) is an armored cyborg and member of the Armored Army who is the master of the tachi and the spiked ball. He battles with both of these weapons on a single chain. While engaged in a secret meeting in an active mineshaft, one of the miners accidentally witnesses the event. Hidouman is assigned to silence the miner, so he takes the miner's family hostage, which lures Metalder into battle. While Ben-K fights the Shadow Light Fighters, Metalder confuses Hidouman through duplication techniques inspired by a previous fight with Galador, and then strikes his hand to separate him from his weapon. Metalder then destroys him with his Laser Arm attack, which also splits him in half.
- Bigwayne (ビッグウェイン, Bigguwein) dresses in black with grey armor plates. His original nickname is the "Titan of Legend". A former Brave General of the Robotic Warrior Army, he retires to become a rankless repair robot. He presumably retired because he became bored, never once losing. He mutinies and escapes from the Empire, and fights Metalder, partially to aid his beloved disciple Gochak. He fires arrows from his right forearm and seems to have super strength. He seems to have a revolver, when he opens the plating on his chest, and can sprout/launch spikes from the plating on his arms. He survives Metalder's Laser Arm, but eventually wears himself out. He falls over from exhaustion and explodes.
- Bluekid (ブルキッド, Burukiddo) is a robotic grunt trained by Bigwayne, who resembles a Shadow Light Fighter, but with a blue outfit. He is destroyed by Metalder in episode 11.
- Hedogross (ヘドグロス, Hedogurosu) is a green frog-like mutant of the Monster Army who took a female slave named Wisdom as his wife. Hedogross can dissolve into green slime and first appears in the Ghost Bank arm wrestling with the Medium Fighters and repair robots. In Episode 8, he fights Barlock in the Ghost Bank and wins the chance to fight Metalder. With the help of Bankora, he takes a scientist hostage. Barlock sneaks in on him and knock him out, swiping the hostage in the process. His fellow mutants, including Geldring, mock him for his love of Wisdom. Hedogross fantasizes about being promoted in the Empire so that he can both love Wisdom and be a respected and powerful warrior. God Neros promises a promotion, and that his dreams would come true, if he destroys Metalder. Battling Metalder, he damages his armor. Darbarbo and Bulchek seem to cause interference in the battle. Metalder's combined Laser Arm and G-Kick attacks cause him to fall over and explode. Before dying, Hedogross spews liquid all over himself and dissolves into slime. Sometime before his death, he conceives a son with his wife Wisdom named Hedogross Jr.

== Mechanics ==
=== Metalder's mechanics ===
Silver Caucus (シルバーカークス, Shirubā Kākusu) is Metalder's secret base of operation, hidden within the Wind Caves of Fuji, underneath the ruins of the former Imperial Army's Headquarters. It is the place where Metalder has lain dormant for over 40 years until his activation at the start of the series. The Silver Caucus is usually kept underground until Metalder needs to dispatch a vehicle, when it rises to the surface. Springer remains there for standby in case Metalder needs him, particularly when Metalder needs repair. When the Neros Empire drew closer to locating the Silver Caucus, Metalder relocates a portion of the base at another cave with Springer.

Side Phantom (サイドファントム, Saido Fantomu) is Metalder's motorcycle vehicle with a detachable side-car.

Metal Charger (メタルチャージャー, Metaru Chājā) is a transforming, four-wheel flying car based on a sixth-generation Mazda Familia that Metalder drives.

=== Neros Empire's mechanics ===
Ghost Bank (ゴーストバンク, Gōsuto Banku) is the secret lair of the Neros Empire where the Four Armies gather. It can move anywhere, but its usual location is underneath the headquarters building of the Kirihara Konzern. Each member of Neros Army has their own warp gate used to transport themselves to the Ghost Bank.

Miragehasha (ミラージュハシャ, Mirājihasha) is a motorcycle with a sidecar used exclusively by the Armored Army.

Circulader (サーキュラダー, Sākiyuradā) is a motorcycle used exclusively by the Robotic Warrior Army.

Captron (キャプトロン, Kiyaputoron) is a motorcycle usually used exclusively by the Monster Army, except when ridden by Coolgin in the first episode.

Drygun (ドライガン, Doraigan) is a combat jeep that has been produced for each of Neros Army. When one is deployed, it carries the flag of its division.

Dark Guncarry (ダークガンキャリー, Dāku Gankyarī) is a station wagon that has been produced for each of Neros Armies. It is mainly used to transport troops.

Dester X1 (デスターX1, Desutā Ekkusu Wan) is an advanced military machine tested by the Armament Army during a demonstration to potential buyers. Equipped with a variety of weapons and heat sensors, by coincidence it is used against Metalder. When the Armament army realizes Metalder was in the area looking for abandoned puppies, these puppies were then used as bait and placed in a minefield guarded by the robot. Metalder deceives the machine using a heated stone which gives him an opening to disable it. It is finally destroyed when Metalder throws Darbarbo onto it, the impact presumably causing his shoulder-mounted artillery to detonate.

== Episodes ==
On October 4, 1987 (The day that episode 25 aired), the show began airing on Sundays instead of Mondays.

1. Hurry! To the Hundred-Demon Spirit World (急げ! 百鬼魔界へ, Isoge! Hyakki Makai e) (Original Airdate: March 16, 1987): written by Susumu Takaku, directed by Takeshi Ogasawara
2. Neroz Becomes More Than a God (余は神・ネロスなり, Yo wa Kami・Nerosu Nari) (Original Airdate: March 23, 1987): written by Susumu Takaku, directed by Takeshi Ogasawara
3. Hammer Man Ben K Cries to the Love for a Hare (野兎への愛にハンマー男ベンKが涙する, Nousagi e no Ai ni Hanmā Otoko Ben Kei ga Namidasuru) (Original Airdate: April 6, 1987): written by Susumu Takaku, directed by Yoshiharu Tomita
4. Torpedo Agmis VS Navy Second Lieutenant Metalder (魚雷アグミス対海軍少尉メタルダー, Gyorai Agumisu Tai Kaigun Shōi Metarudā) (Original Airdate: April 13, 1987): written by Susumu Takaku, directed by Yoshiharu Tomita
5. Hold on! Never-Missing Gunplay (耐える! 百発百中のガンプレイ, Taeru! Hyabbatsuhyakuchū Ganpurei) (Original Airdate: April 20, 1987): written by Susumu Takaku, directed by Itaru Orita and Takeshi Ogasawara
6. Anger! Knockout the Heavyweight Rules Galdos (怒る! ヘビー級王者ガルドスをKOせよ, Ikaru! Hebī Kyūōja Garudosu o Kei Ō seyo) (Original Airdate: April 27, 1987): written by Susumu Takaku, directed by Itaru Orita and Takeshi Ogasawara
7. Decide the Goal! The Tag Brothers and the Duel of Flames (ゴールを決めろ! タグ兄弟との炎の決闘, Gōru o Kimeru! Tagu Kyodai tono Honō Kettō) (Original Airdate: May 4, 1987): written by Haruya Yamazaki, directed by Yoshiharu Tomita
8. Farewell, Barlock! The Secret of the Iron Mask (さらばバーロック! 鉄仮面の秘密, Saraba Bārokku! Tetsu Kamen no Himitsu) (Original Airdate: May 11, 1987): written by Masahiro Kakefuda, directed by Yoshiharu Tomita
9. Dreaming Monster! Lovers in a Crossfire (夢みるモンスター! 十字砲火の恋人たち, Yumemiru Monsutā! Jūjihōka no Koibito-tachi) (Original Airdate: May 18, 1987): written by Kunio Fujii, directed by Toshihiro Ito
10. Excellent Technique! The Violin Attack of the Famous Music Robot (超絶技! 名曲ロボットのバイオリン攻撃, Chōzetsu Waza! Meikyoku Robotto no Baiorin Kōgeki) (Original Airdate: May 25, 1987): written by Shozo Uehara, directed by Toshihiro Ito
11. Pursuit of the Brave! A Giant Rises in the Sky!! (勇者の追撃! 天空にそそりたつ巨人!!, Yūsha no Tsuigeki! Tenkū ni Sosoritatsu Kyojin!!) (Original Airdate: June 1, 1987): written by Nobuo Ogizawa, directed by Michio Konishi
12. Monster's Beloved・Sieging Ninjas (愛しのモンスター・包囲する忍者たち!, Aishi no Monsutā・Hōisuru Ninja-tachi!) (Original Airdate: June 8, 1987): written by Kunio Fujii, directed by Michio Konishi
13. Critical Moment! Valley Umineko Restores the Love of Parent and Child (危機一髪! 親と子が愛をもどす海猫の村, Kiki Ippatsu! Oya to Ko ga Ai o Modosu Umineko no Mura) (Original Airdate: June 15, 1987): written by Susumu Takaku, directed by Yoshiharu Tomita
14. Little Sister is Alive! Sorrowful Lady Soldier Madonna (妹よ生きて! 哀しみの女戦士マドンナ, Imōto wa Ikite! Kanashimi no Joshi Madonna) (Original Airdate: June 22, 1987): written by Akira Nakahara, directed by Yoshiharu Tomita
15. Soaring Monster・Son! Mother's Wish! (翔くモンスター・息子よ、母の願いを!, Tobuku Monsutā・Musuko yo, Haha no Negai wo!) (Original Airdate: June 29, 1987): written by Kunio Fujii, directed by Kaneharu Mitsumura
16. Love's Rival is a Cruching Biker Family (恋のライバルはバリバリ爆走族, Koi no Raibaru wa Baribari Bakusōzoku) (Original Airdate: July 6, 1987): written by Susumu Takaku, directed by Kaneharu Mitsumura
17. Mai at Risk! Running One-Eyed Dragon Top Gunder (危うし舞! 走る独眼竜トップガンダー, Ayaushi Mai! Hashiru Dokuganryū Toppu Gandā) (Original Airdate: July 13, 1987): written by Susumu Takaku, directed by Toshihiro Ito
18. Mai's Secret Information・Poolside's Trap (舞の秘密情報・プールサイドの罠, Mai no Himitsu Jōhō・Pūrusaido no Wana) (Original Airdate: July 20, 1987): written by Susumu Takaku, directed by Toshihiro Ito
19. Summer Vacation is an Adventure Tour to the Ghost Bank (夏休みはゴーストバンクへ冒険ツアー, Natsuyasumi wa Gōsutobanku e Bouken Tsuā) (Original Airdate: July 27, 1987): written by Susumu Takaku, directed by Takeshi Ogasawara
20. Target is the Puppies? Fire-Breathing Army Armaments (ターゲットは仔犬? 火をふく機甲軍団, Tāgetto wa Koinu? Hi o Fuku Kikō Gundan) (Original Airdate: August 17, 1987): written by Susumu Takaku, directed by Kaneharu Mitsumura
21. A Citywide Mystery・The Beautiful Girl Who Calls Fireflies (大都会ミステリー・ホタルを呼ぶ美少女, Daitokai Misuterī・Hotaru o Yobu Bishōjo) (Original Airdate: August 24, 1987): written by Susumu Takaku, directed by Kaneharu Mitsumura
22. Sky-Soaring Rollers! Raid of the Red Dolphins (空飛ぶローラー! 赤いイルカの襲撃, Soratobi Rōrā! Akai Iruka no Shūgeki) (Original Airdate: August 31, 1987): written by Susumu Takaku, directed by Toshihiro Ito
23. Who's Top?! The Best and Worst's Big Sports Day (トップは誰だ?! ピンからキリの大運動会, Toppu wa Dare da?! Pin kara Kin no Daiundōkai) (Original Airdate: September 7, 1987): written by Akira Nakahara, directed by Toshihiro Ito
24. Princess Tenko VS Galador's Black Magic Technique Battle (プリンセス天功VSガラドーの魔術合戦, Purinsesu Tenko Tai Garadō no Majutsu Kassen) (Original Airdate: September 14, 1987): written by Susumu Takaku, directed by Takeshi Ogasawara
25. Help! The Beloved Gori-chan's Escape Journal (助けて! 愛しのゴリちゃん逃亡日記, Tasukete! Aishi no Gori-chan Tōbō Niki) (Original Airdate: October 4, 1987): written by Nobuo Ogizawa, directed by Takeshi Ogasawara
26. Fly! JAC Blitzkrieg Cheering Party (とびだせ! ジャック電撃応援団, Tobidase! Jakku Dengeki ōendan) (Original Airdate: October 11, 1987): written by Susumu Takaku, directed by Kanaharu Mitsumura
27. Winners! Blazing JAC Guys (ぶっちぎり! 炎のジャック野郎, Bucchigiri! Honō no Jakku Yarō) (Original Airdate: October 18, 1987): written by Susumu Takaku, directed by Kaneharu Mitsumura
28. Lovely Thief・Shining Diamond Shines Upon a Virgin's Wish (可愛い盗賊・きらめくダイヤに乙女の願いを!, Kawaii Tōzoku・Kirameku Daiya ni Otome no Negai yo!) (Original Airdate: October 25, 1987): written by Kunio Fujii, directed by Toshihiro Ito
29. The Sorrowful Story of the Stray Dog (ある哀しいのら犬の物語, Aru Kanashimi Norainu no Monogatari) (Original Airdate: November 1, 1987): written by Akira Nakahara, directed by Toshihiro Ito
30. Protect! The Secret Base (守れ! 秘密基地, Mamore! Himitsu Kichi) (Original Airdate: November 8, 1987): written by Susumu Takaku, directed by Takeshi Ogasawara
31. Target the Power Surge! The Girls Who Dreams Love (瞬転を狙え! 愛を夢みる少女, Shunten o Nerae! Ai wo Yumemiru Shōjo) (Original Airdate: November 15, 1987): written by Kunio Fujii, directed by Takeshi Ogasawara
32. Legend of the Century Beauty (百年美人伝説, Hyakunen Bijin Densetsu) (Original Airdate: November 22, 1987): written by Shigeru Yanagawa, directed by Kaneharu Mitsumura
33. Big Siege Network, Escape of Heated Friendship (大包囲網 熱き友情の脱出, Daihōimō Atsuki Yūjo no Dasshutsu) (Original Airdate: November 29, 1987): written by Susumu Takaku, directed by Kaneharu Mitsumura
34. The Emperor with a Thousand Faces・Neros (千の顔を持つ帝王・ネロス, Sen no Kao o Motsu Teiō・Nerosu) (Original Airdate: December 6, 1987): written by Susumu Takaku, directed by Toshihiro Ito
35. Emperor・Neroz's Identity is? (帝王・ネロスの正体は?, Teiō・Nerosu no Shōtai wa?) (Original Airdate: December 13, 1987): written by Susumu Takaku, directed by Toshihiro Ito
36. Big Counteroffense! The Robot Army's Showdown (大反撃! 戦闘ロボット軍団, Daihangeki! Sentō Robotto Gundan) (Original Airdate: December 20, 1987): written by Susumu Takaku, directed by Takeshi Ogasawara
37. Great Collapse! Neroz Empire (大崩壊! ネロス帝国, Daihōkai! Nerosu Teikoku) (Original Airdate: December 27, 1987): written by Susumu Takaku, directed by Takeshi Ogasawara
38. Great Counterattack! Wasteland of Love and Hatred (大逆襲! 愛と憎しみの荒野, Daigyakushū! Ai to Nikushimi no Kōya) (Original Airdate: January 10, 1988): written by Kunio Fujii, directed by Kaneharu Mitsumura
39. Great Decisive Battle! Metalder for Eternity (大決戦! メタルダーよ永遠に, Daikessen! Metarudā yo Eien ni) (Original Airdate: January 17, 1988): written by Kunio Fujii, directed by Kaneharu Mitsumura

== Movie ==
A film version of Choujinki Metalder, set between episodes 17 and 18 premiered on July 18, 1987 at the "Toei Manga Matsuri" film festival, where it was shown as part of a quadruple feature alongside Dragon Ball: Sleeping Princess in Devil's Castle, Saint Seiya: The Movie and the film version of Hikari Sentai Maskman.

- Written by: Susumu Takaku
- Directed by: Yoshiharu Tomita

== Cast ==
- Ryusei Tsurugi, Tatsuo Koga: Seikō Senoo (妹尾 青洸, Senoo Seikō) (credited as Akira Senoo (妹尾 洸, Senoo Akira))
- Mai Ougi: Hiroko Aota (青田 浩子, Aota Hiroko)
- Hakko Kita: Kazuoki Takahashi (高橋 和興, Takahashi Kazuoki) (credited as Hiroshi Kawai (河合 宏, Kawai Hiroshi))
- Mukimukiman: Seiji Tsushima (対馬 誠二, Tsushima Seiji) (credited as Mukimukiman (ムキムキマン))
- Fuufuuchu: Benkei Daikokubō (大黒坊 弁慶, Daikokubō Benkei) (credited as Hana Arashi (花 嵐, Hana Arashi))
- Beautiful Secretary K: Yūko Mitsui (美津井 祐子, Mitsui Yūko)
- Beautiful Secretary S: Emiko Yamamoto (山本 恵美子, Yamamoto Emiko)
- Shingo Ougi: Hiroshi Arikawa (有川 博, Arikawa Hiroshi)
- Gozo Kirihara/Kunio Muraki: Shinji Tōdō (藤堂 新二, Tōdō Shinji)

=== Voice cast ===
- Metalder: Michirō Iida (飯田 道朗, Iida Michirō)
- Springer: Genpei Hayashiya (林家 源平, Hayashiya Genpei)
- God Neros: Takeshi Watabe (渡部 猛, Watabe Takeshi)
- Narrator: Issei Masamune (政宗 一成, Masamune Issei)

=== Guest cast ===
- Dr. Ryuichiro Koga (1): Ken Uehara (上原 謙, Uehara Ken)
- Herself (24): Princess Tenko (引田 天功, Hikita Tenkō)
- Takuji (卓治; 25–26): Kenji Ohba (大葉 健二, Ōba Kenji)
- Master (25–26): Junichi Haruta (春田 純一, Haruta Jun'ichi)
- Tetsuya (哲也; 25–26): Hiroshi Watari (渡 洋史, Watari Hiroshi)
- Miki (美樹; 25–26): Makoto Sumikawa (澄川 真琴, Sumikawa Makoto)
- Risa (リサ; 25–26): Sumiko Tanaka (田中 澄子, Tanaka Sumiko)

== Songs ==
Opening theme

- "Kimi no Seishun wa Kagayaite Iru ka?" (君の青春は輝いているか; "Does Your Youth Shine?")
  - Lyrics: James Miki (ジェームス三木, Jēmusu Miki)
  - Composition: Takashi Miki (三木 たかし, Miki Takashi)
  - Arrangement: Kōhei Tanaka
  - Artist: Isao Sasaki

Ending theme

- "Time Limit" (タイムリミット, Taimu Rimitto)
  - Lyrics: James Miki
  - Composition: Takashi Miki
  - Arrangement: Kōhei Tanaka
  - Artist: Ichirou Mizuki & Koorogi '73

== International Broadcasts & Home Video ==
- In its home country of Japan, Toei Video released the series on VHS from January 1991 to September 1992. 7 volumes were released as only up to 21 out of 39 were made available in this format. The reason why it was released half-finished and in the middle, had nothing to do with the popularity, but there was a change in Toei Video's policy at the time, as it was being released around the same time it was implemented. Space Sheriff Shaider and MegaBeast Investigator Juspion were also stopped midway. Instead, they decided to start doing full releases of newer works, starting with Chōjin Sentai Jetman. Years later on February 21, 2007, all 39 episodes were released on home video for the first time on DVD, as well as the movie was in a seven-disc DVD Boxset. In 2026, it was announced that Metalder would be receiving a Blu-ray release set for March 2027. This new Blu-ray Boxset will be remastered from a 4K scan of the series’ original film negatives.
- In Thailand, the series aired on Channel 3 with a Thai dub on Sunday Mornings from 1989-1990 as Superhuman Robot Metalder. (ยอดมนุษย์หุ่นยนต์ เมทัลเดอร์)
- In the Philippines, it was given a Tagalog dub and aired on ABS-CBN from 1990 to 1991.
- In France, the series aired as simply Metalder on TF1's Club Dorothee block on July 24, 1989. It was licensed by AB Groupe and Studio SOFI produced a French dub for the series to air, and all episodes were covered. It was also released on VHS in the 1990s by Dagobert Vidéo (AB Groupe's video brand). In addition, the original music score by Seiji Yokoyama was entirely replaced with new musical pieces by Shuki Levy for the French dub, who also later worked with Saban Entertainment. However, Episodes 17 and 18 kept the saxophone variant of the original Metalder theme song and the sound effects were still kept intact.
- In Brazil, it was given a Brazilian Portuguese dub and aired as Metalder, o Homem Máquina (meaning Metalder, the Machine Man) on Rede Bandeirantes from April 21 to December 21 of 1990.
- In Hong Kong, the series was given a Cantonese Chinese dub and aired on TVB Jade as Silver Warrior (銀戰士 Yín Zhànshì), on November 22, 1994.
- In Indonesia, the series was given an Indonesian dub and aired on RCTI in 1996.
- In South Korea, the series was released on VHS with a Korean dub under Superhuman Metalder. (초인기 메탈더)
