= Jikuu Senshi Spielban =

- Also known as: Dimensional Warrior Spielban
- Genre: Tokusatsu; Superhero fiction Science fiction
- Created by: Saburō Yatsude
- Developed by: Shozo Uehara
- Directed by: Makoto Tsuji
- Starring: Hiroshi Watari; Makoto Sumikawa; Naomi Morinaga; Ichirou Mizuki; Machiko Soga
- Voices of: Shōzō Iizuka
- Narrated by: Tōru Ōhira
- Composer: Michiaki Watanabe
- Country of origin: Japan
- No. of episodes: 44

Production
- Running time: 25 minutes
- Production companies: Toei Company; Asatsu-DK

Original release
- Network: TV Asahi
- Release: April 7, 1986 – March 9, 1987

Related
- MegaBeast Investigator Juspion; Choujinki Metalder

Dimensional Warrior Spielban (時空戦士スピルバン, Jikū Senshi Supiruban) is a Japanese tokusatsu television series, part of the Metal Hero Series franchise created by Toei Co. Ltd. and aired from April 7, 1986 to March 9, 1987. Spielban's footage was used for Saban’s live-action series, VR Troopers.

For distribution purposes, Toei Company refers to this television series as Spielvan.

== Plot ==
The Waller Empire destroys the planet Clin in search of water for its deity. Two Clinian children, Spielban and Diana, escape to Earth aboard the Grand Nasca. The two grow up during the long journey and don High Tech Crystal Suits to defeat the Waller who have come to Earth in search of more water. Spielban must avenge his dead mother Anna and his homeworld, and find his missing father Ben and older sister Helen. Unknown to Spielban at the start of the series his father and sister have been made members of the Waller against their will.

== Characters ==
=== Grand Nasca crew ===
Spielban's group is based on the super dimensional mothership Grand Nasca, the source of Spielban and Diana's armor and vehicles. Diana also pilots it to see above the battlefield while Spielban is in Gaios. Its projectile weapons are Nasca Missiles and Nasca Rockets. It also transforms into the Big Bang Cannon, a bazooka-type weapon that Spielban can use. It can also go into "Combat Formation", where it becomes a giant robot that performs the "Nasca Hyper Crush" where it stomps General Deathzero's tank vehicles, shoot beams from its eyes (the Excel Beam), and uses "Knuckle Bomber", where it punches General Deathzero's fighter planes in mid-air.

- Spielban (スピルバン, Supiruban): Anna and Ben's younger son and Helen's younger brother. A 20-year-old man from the planet Clin, he assumed the alias of Yosuke Jou (城洋介, Jō Yōsuke) while on Earth. When he shouts "Kesshou!" ("Crystallize"), the Grand Nasca showers "Clin Metal Super Corpuscles" upon him, which crystallize to form the silver, black and red suit around his body in 10 microseconds. Spielban's primary weapon is a sword which then becomes the Twin Blade, a double-edged laser lance used to destroy the mechanoids and lifeforms with his "Arc Impulse" attack. His name is a reference to American director Steven Spielberg. Spiel is derived from Spielberg, while ban is derived from Esteban, a Spanish variant of the English name Steven.
- Diana (ダイアナ, Daiana): Marine's only daughter. She is 18 years old and Spielban's partner fighting as Diana Lady (ダイアナレディ, Daiana Redii) by performing the same techniques as Spielban to activate her own white and red suit. When she shouts "Kesshou!" ("Crystallize"), the Grand Nasca showers "Clin Metal Super Corpuscles" upon her, which crystallize to form the white red suit around her body in 10 microseconds. Like Spielban, Diana is quite capable in a fight both in and out of uniform and carries with her the Lady Sniper which acts as her own personal weapon. She primarily serves as a backup for Spielban when they battle the mechanoids or when the Waller send out assault vehicles. There have been times when the Waller have turned their attention towards her once they recognized how much of a threat to them she can be. A running gag on the show was that she would use her charm and sex appeal on the Kinclons, distracting them from their duties while she made her move. Another gag is that she sometimes uses her rear end to attack the Kinclons, which apparently knocks them out cold.
- Helen (ヘレン, Heren): Anna and Ben's daughter and Spielban's older sister is 22 and was captured by the Waller Empire when she was only a child. She was forced to witness Waller turning her father into Dr. Bio. Later, Dr. Bio was instructed to do the very same to her as well, converting her into Hellvira (ヘルバイラ, Herubaira) with a secondary persona that activates via remote control. Helen is constantly kept away from her brother fearing she would turn into Hellvira and kill him. When trying to stop Spielban and Diana from killing Dr. Bio her secret as Hellvira is revealed as well as revealing Dr. Bio's identity as Speilban's father. After Pandora's trap almost kills her, Bio places the comatose Helen in a protective tube. When Diana learns that Helen survived, she and Spielban save her, as Dr. Bio destroys the remote control, deactivating the Hellvira persona. Soon after, Helen joins her brother in the fight against the Waller as Helen Lady (ヘレンレディ, Heren Redii). When she shouts "Kesshou!" ("Crystallize"), Helen is equipped with a high-tech crystal armor identical to Diana's and is and armed with the double-sided Helen Cutter.

==== Arsenal ====
- Super Dimensional Tank Gaios: A small tank-like vehicle piloted by Spielban. Armed with Gaios Rockets, Gaios Missiles and a Gaios Laser, it is also able to remove its cockpit and turn into "Jet Gaios" for aerial combat and "Drill Gaios" for digging underground. The Jet Gaios fires the Gaios Beam.
- Hoverian: A hover-craft vehicle piloted by Spielban which turns into a motorcycle and can fire Hoverian Lasers and perform the Hoverian Rush.

=== Others ===
- Anna: Spielban and Helen's mother chose Spielban and Diana to survive by escaping in the Grand Nasca shortly before the destruction of the Clin mothership. She died but was restored to life in the alternate future timeline in which the Waller Empire never existed.
- Marine: Diana's mother who died when the Clin detonated their own mothership but was restored to life in the alternate future timeline in which the Waller Empire never existed.
- Space Swordsman Teacher: A hologram generated by the Grand Nasca's computers to train Spielban in swordsmanship. Later trains Helen/Helen Lady in the same capacity.
- Daigorou Koyama: Owner of the invention shop "Edison". He claims to be a genius and comes up with various gadgets that never quite work out. Was once tricked into building a robot for the Waller.
- Miwa Koyama: Daigorou's younger sister. She helps out at "Edison" but is sick of Daigorou's inventions that never sell.

=== Waller Empire ===
The Waller Empire (ワーラー帝国, Wārā Teikoku) is the antagonistic group in Spielban. From their winged turtle-like mobile fortress called the Waller Castle Gamedeath, they search for water throughout the universe on the notion that they are sustaining the life Waller Empire's Guardian Spirit Waller (ワーラー帝国の支配者ワーラー, Wārā Teikoku no Shihaisha Wārā).

- Queen Pandora (女王パンドラ, Joō Pandora): Originally a giant starfish that needs vast amounts of water to survive, Pandora is the leader of Waller who conceived the Waller deity to establish her Empire while instilling fear in her subordinates. In the two-part series finale after her other followers have died, Pandora personally fights Spielban while splitting into the forms of Pandora Battle Mechanoid (パンドラ戦闘機械人, Pandora Sentou Kikainin) and the starfish-like Pandora Lifeform (パンドラ生命体, Pandora Seimeitai). Thought to have been destroyed, Pandora endures and reveals herself as Waller's true leader when she reverted Dr. Bio to Ben for his attempt to sabotage the Gamedeath in her absence. Pandora once more splits into her two forms to battle Spielban's group before merging into a more powerful Pandora Life-Mechanoid (パンドラ生命機械人, Pandora Seikikanin) to finish them off. But Ben injects Pandora with a virus that is harming her at a cellular level, allowing Spielban to kill her as she reverts to her natural form.
- Emperor Guillowtine (ギローチン皇帝, Girōchin Kōtei): He claims to be a descendant of Waller, which therefore makes him a relative of Pandora. He was summoned from the 23rd century by Poss from the life of a street beggar to help Pandora in the present. Though he treats his followers and allies as somewhat disposable, he remains eternally loyal to his Queen. Guillowtine kept Poss for a pet. He dislikes Youki from the start, sensing that this new general will betray the Waller. Guillowtine is dressed similarly to a rebel biker. He falls into a dimensional rift and returns as a ghost. As a ghostly form he invades the Grand Nasca and attempts to torture Helen. In this form, his right arm has been replaced by a small, living, snake-like monster which he could launch at the heroes. He was eventually destroyed by Spielban with the help of the Grand Nasca's energy.
  - Poss (可能性, Kanōsei): Poss is a talking gerbil Battle Lifeform who summoned Emperor Guillowtine. He told Guillowtine that his life as a beggar was caused by Spielban. Emperor Guillowtine kept Poss as a pet who is later left to Pandora, after he is rifted and destroyed. Poss was later contained and destroyed by Dr. Ben during the finale.
- Machine Army Leader General Deathzero (機械軍団 リーダーデスゼロウ将軍, Kikaigundan Rīdā Desuzero Shōgun): Leader of Waller's Battle Mechanoids he is a black-armored android who is programmed with a knowledge of all tactics. He can transform into the Deathzero Torpedo, a black headed missile that is launched from a catapult. He transforms into this form twice during the series (Episodes 24 and 42) which coincidentally were the only two times he battled Spielban himself. It was strongly hinted that Deathzero was attracted to Diana. He later challenges Spielban to a second battle (both inside and outside of his tank), now having become/been promoted to Super General and powered with a 10,000 volt cylinder given to him by Pandora. Deathzero is destroyed by Spielban soon afterwards, with Spielban using his Arc Impulse.
- Bio Army Leader Doctor Bio (軍団 リーダードクターバイオ, Baiogundan Rīdā Dokutā Baio): Formerly Spielban's father Doctor Ben, he was captured by Deathzero and converted into an inhuman being to serve the Waller Empire as its scientist and leader of the Biohumans and Battle-Lifeforms he creates with Lifeform Modification Surgery. He was also protective of Helen and constantly watched over her like a father would. Bio can unleash vine-like appendages from his arms and wields a giant sword in battle. In his first and only battle against Spielban, he mutated and ended up in a Bioroid monster form called Bioroid Bio (バイオロイドバイオ, Baioroido Baio). Bioroid Bio's abilities included transforming into plant life or slime and summoning small bee-like creatures and tentacles from his body. In this battle Helen tries to protect, and prevent him from fighting, his son Spielban before she was forcibly transformed into Hellvira. Pandora sets up an explosive trap to kill Bio, Helen, Diana, and Spielban all at once though, unfortunately for her, all four of them survive. Bio uses his slime morphing ability to pull his daughter and himself to safety. After surviving the battle, Bio returns to the Empire and transforms into a floating brain with eyeballs and a spinal cord. Dr. Bio breaks Helen's remote control and is attacked by Deathzero under Pandora's orders. Afterwards, Pandora takes away his privilege of moving around freely and imprisons him in a water-filled glass tube. He returns to his Dr. Bio form, with Pandora's efforts, and is reverted to his original human form when he attempted to sabotage the Gamedeath. Weakened as a result, he killed the gerbil he created when it attempted to stop him. Ben acquires one of the viruses he developed as Bio and uses it on Pandora, who killed him in the process. But Ben is restored to life in the alternate future timeline in which the Waller Empire never existed.
- Spy Army Leader Licky (スパイ軍団 リッキー, Supaigundan Rīdā Rikki): Leader of the Waller's all-female spy army. At one point, she tricks the owner of the Edison shop named Daigorou Koyama into building a prototype for a Battle Mechanoid. She often spies and comes up with cruel plans for the Waller, but is not one for combat. After Licky interferes with Youki's plan, Pandora angrily turns her into a stone statue for Youki to use as his throne. After Youki's death, the talking gerbil was given this throne for his own. During the finale, it disappears when it was presumably destroyed when the Gamedeath exploded.
  - Shadow & Gasha (シャドー & ガシャー, Shadō & Gashā): Rikki's aides and fellow spies in Waller's all-female Spy Army. They assist Rikki in almost every evil scheme she creates and employs against Spielban and Diana. Spielban manages to destroy them both with a single strike of his sword when they tried to attack him during a vulnerable time per Guillotine's orders. Unfortunately for them he had gained a second wind, shocking the Waller. Even if he had not they would have been destroyed anyway, as the daggers exploded during the battle. Guillotine had tricked them into wielding the daggers, having promised them an increase in rank for killing Spielban. Upon being destroyed, they were revealed to be robots as they leave behind mechanical pieces and chunks of metal.
- Youki (ヨウキ, Youki): A new Waller officer and androgynic entity created from the evil hearts of men by the Waller deity's (Pandora's) power. He gathered key members of Japanese society and brainwashed them into joining his own secret society, Mumumu. He uses these brainwashed characters to attack and terrorize the city, as well as Spielban and the heroes. Spielban was able to save the brainwashed masses. Youki can appear and disappear at will, as well as blast lasers from his mouth in battle which he first demonstrates in a fight against Spielban. Not trusted by many of the other officers Youki eventually decides to take over Waller, creating the Youki Battle Mechanoid from the remains of various Battle Mechanoids. Vacuumer destroys Youki's creation and sucks up most of his powers. Afterwards, Pandora kills the weakened Youki with his corpse given a funeral before being sent into the depths of space.
- Kinclones (キンクロン, Kinkuron): Waller's mass-produced Battle Machine Soldiers, garbed in black tights with gold stripes, smiling gold masks with red eye slits, and black and gold capes. Some Kinclones attack with capes, some by kicking their detonating heads at Spielban, and some are equipped with blades on their hands. There was also a Kinclone with a robotic head which was revealed upon being struck by Spielban's Twin Blade. This one seemed stronger than the normal Kinclones, but was destroyed by Spielban just the same.

==== Waller vehicles ====
- Waller Battleship Skulljaws: The Waller's transport battleships that resemble giant flying sharks. They are launched from the Gamedeath during battles.
- Skulldon: General Deathzero's black tank which splits into the Skulldon Jet (top half) and the Skulldon Cutter (bottom half), a tank armed with a buzzsaw. Skulldon is accompanied by numerous lesser unnamed black tanks and is frequently defeated and knocked around by the Grand Nasca.

==== Battle Mechanoids ====
The Battle Mechanoids (戦闘機械人, Sentō Kikaijin) are robotic monsters under Deathzero's command.

- MechaShoulder (メカショルダー, Mekashorudā): A spider-like Battle Machineman with massive shoulders and hidden weapons such as an electrical laser under its faceplate that was deployed to deal with Spielban and Diana. During the battle Spielban managed to blast off the robot's arms, but the ring on its back remained and was used to bind Spielban. Gathering the strength he had left Spielban broke free and destroyed MechaShoulder with his Arc Impulse.
- MechaBander (メカバンダー, Mekabandā): A Battle Machineman with large shoulders that was built following MechaShoulder's demise. While investigating the Waller's latest scheme Spielban was lured into a trap/battle against MechaBander. It had multiple arms, including two large hands and an axe-equipped arm. Also included in its arsenal are electrical dischargers in its shoulders. Spielban survived the first encounter against MechaBander, but the two fought once more. This time Spielban had a plan, scanning the robot for a weak spot. He attacked/blasted the device on the robot's head weakening it and disabling the dischargers before ultimately killing it.
- MechaJoker (メカジョ－カー, MekaJōkā): MechaJoker can extend cables from his chest and blast electrical lasers from the cable's tips. MechaShocker has a bazooka hidden in the right hump, next to its face, which he used to blast Spielban. The battle did not last long as Spielban made short of the robot with his Arc Impulse.
- MechaPuter (メカピューター, Mekapyūtā): Spielban spotted Helen while out patrolling the city, however his search for her was cut short by the appearance of Mechaputer. Mechaputer had all of Spielban's attacks downloaded into its system. As a result, it could predict Spielban's attacks before he made them, making Mechaputer able to attack, defend and evade as it pleased. Spielban warped the battle to an empty rock quarry when Deathzero's army arrived. Spielban made short work of the jets and retreated from the battle. Helen was then forced to set up a trap for her brother and lured him into another fight with Mechaputer. This time Diana was in battle and Mechaputer had no data on her, so it was brought down and weakened by Diana and Spielban's combined laser attack (the Double Sniper). It was finally destroyed by Spielban's Arc Impulse.
- MechaAquactor (メカノーチラ): A nautilus-themed robot with a small tank-like form that was assigned to guard the Waller's new underwater lab. Daigorou and a friend were fishing nearby and accidentally snagged MechaAquactor. The robot then pulled them both into the aquatic base where they were greeted by the bathing suit-clad Rikki, Gasher, and Shadow. Shortly afterwards the men were released after the Waller femmes fatale flirted with them. Daigorou told Spielban about the underwater paradise, which made him suspect that the Waller may be involved. After discovering the lab Spielban was attacked by Waller's jets and MechaAquactor. MechaAquactor mercilessly drove over Spielban and then transformed into a full humanoid form. Spielban took a heavy beating but was saved thanks to a recharge from Diana. Spielban used his Arc Impulse on MechaAquactor and destroyed it.
- MechaMachine (メカマジン, Mekamajin): A samurai-themed robot equipped with machine gun and laser blasters concealed under his large shoulder pads. This robot could also blast a powerful laser from the sphere-like apparatus in his forehead. The Waller's plan this time was to target Diana. Once Diana was isolated at a dam, MechaMachine appeared with the Kinclones to fight her. Diana held her own as long as she could, but MechaMajin was too strong. It broke her Lady Sniper and threw her off the dam. Injured and bleeding, Diana fled into the woods where she came face to face with Helen. Helen treated Diana's wounds but was forced to flee from the Waller's soldiers when they appeared. Both ladies parted ways and Diana once again faced off with MechaMachine, but Spielban came to the rescue this time. He loaned Diana his Laser Sniper to and destroyed MechaMachine with his Arc Impulse.
- MechaRoboter (メカロボター, Mekarobotā): A robot originally created by Daigorou. An attractive businesswoman came into the Edison shop and offered him a great sum of money if he would construct a robot for her. Daigorou, infatuated by the mystery woman, was more than happy to accept the job. The woman was really Rikki in disguise and the Waller's plan was to use the goofy inventor's creation to launch a sneak attack on Spielban. He went to work dreaming about the possibilities of fame, fortune, and women. Daigorou finally finished his robot, but knock-out gas filled his shop and the Kinclones added their own secret modifications. A party was held to celebrate the robot's creation, but the robot secretly attacked Spielban with a small deadly acupuncture needle in its finger. Spielban faked his demise as he was wearing protective body armor under his jacket. The robot discarded its creator's logo and changed into its spiky Battle Mechanoid form. Spielban went into battle with it and destroyed it with his Arc Impulse.
- MechaGunman (メカガンマン, Mekaganman): A robotic sniper armed with a laser rifle and a sword. It was also the first Machine Man with the ability to speak. At the beginning of the episode, Spielban came face to face with a mystery man in a cowboy hat and poncho. MechaGunman and Spielban exchanged gunfire, but MechaGunman left the battle and demanded a showdown for later. This was also the first fight which left Spielban injured. Spielban modified his laser sniper and practiced his target shooting on board Grand Nasca. Meanwhile, the Waller examined the data MechaGunman had managed to collect on Spielban. When the two had their second gunfight MechaGunman had new surprises. MechaGunman generated a radar and a red laser shield to deflect Spielban's fire. Diana joined the fight but did not fare much better against the shield. She was quickly defeated, but her fall gave Spielban the motivation to short out the gunman's shield and destroy the robot.
- MechaFreezer (メカフリーザー, Mekafureizā): A robot based on home appliances like a minibar for a chest, a vacuum cleaner for a right arm, a mechanical fan-like apparatus below the minibar chest, a desk lamp on its left shoulder, and a loudspeaker for an upper right thigh. MechaFreezer could use his right arm like a vacuum cleaner to attack as well as using its fan-like apparatus to blast Spielban and Diana with fierce winds and ice spray. An average family was given the chance to live their lives in comfort and fortune in a futuristic house with a safe filled with money. The youngest son felt something was not quite right about the house but the boy's parents and older siblings began to let greed set in as they became more and more conceited. The boy was a friend of Spielban's, so Spielban personally took a look at the house only to get booted out by the parents. Diana had a different approach, placing a spy camera there disguised a toy, courtesy of the Edison Shop. One night the appliances began to behave strangely. The two heroes charged in to witness the birth of MechaFreezer. Spielban eventually destroyed MechaFreezer with his Arc Impulse.
- DrillHander (ドリルハンダー, Doriruhandā): A drill-themed robot. The episode began with Spielban on a high speed chase to rescue a bus full of children and a teacher from the Kinclones, but waiting for him was DrillHander. While Spielban engaged the robot in combat, Hoverian was stolen. Deathzero then announced to Spielban that he had a choice to either recover his bike, or save the children from a bomb. Unable to do both, Spielban retreated to the Grand Nasca to formulate a plan to rescue both the bike and the kids. Throughout the episode a narration recaps all the Spielban arsenal in action as well as the two Metal Heroes' training. After training with a holographic swordsman, Spielban finally has a plan. Diana uses her sex appeal to distract the Kinclone guards while Spielban sneaks into the abandoned warehouse. Meanwhile, Deathzero was trying to dismantle the bike to extract any useful information, but had no luck. Spielban finds the hostages, but is ambushed by DrillHander. The bike suddenly springs to life, breaks free of the restraints and aids its master. Spielban kills DrillHander with his Arc Impulse while riding Hoverian.
- BossKong (ボスコング, Bosukongu): A gorilla-themed robot. Bosskong had spikes on his fists, and could launch his fists like flying maces at Spielban and Diana in battle. The Waller took a local camping site hostage; two men made an attempt to escape but were stopped by the robotic primate. The two men were recaptured, restrained, and tortured by the Kinclones. A young boy also tries to escape and is successful. Spielban finds the child and learns about the hostage situation. As Spielban makes his way to the campsite, BossKong is spying on him. He manages to free everyone, but Spielban finds himself in serious trouble against BossKong. Diana comes to the rescue, but her efforts against BossKong do not fare any better. BossKong takes hold of Spielban's sword with its jaws and, to reclaim it, Spielban hops onto the monkey's back, pounding it repeatedly until BossKong overheats. Spielban used his Arc Impulse to destroy BossKong.
- Blocker (ブロッカー, Burokkā): A powerful white robot equipped with a hook and a large blaster pack on its shoulder. Blocker has the ability to detach its arms to attack its opponents. Spielban's friend, a young boy named Nobuo, was playing a motorcycle arcade game. Nobuo was then approached by a stranger who offered him a chance to try out a new arcade game. The game was a trap and Nobuo's mind became trapped inside a virtual world. Spielban follows and has his mind trapped as well. Inside the virtual world, and unable to transform, Spielban went through endless bizarre events during his quest to find Nobuo. Every time Spielban came close to Nobuo and the mysterious man, his location kept changing from the urban city, to rock quarries, to train yards. With each new setting there were simulated people who looked harmless but attacked him without warning, including a pair of white robotic hands. The hands belonged to the robot Blocker. Meanwhile, his real body was transported to a hospital with Diana watching over him. Every injury Spielban sustained in the virtual world, his body also suffered. His body was also in danger as the surgeon treating it was Blocker in disguise. The surgeon attacked Diana, who pleaded Spielban to wake up. After Diana freed him from Blocker's control, Spielban managed to wake up from his virtual nightmare and transform to battle Blocker. He managed to cut off Blocker's arms and kick off its head, but it made no difference and the robot continued to attack. It was finally defeated for good by Spielban's Arc Impulse. Nobuo was saved as well and was eager to play more video games.
- Dorberer (ドーベラー, Dōberā): A fire-breathing Dobermann-like robot with a high-jumping ability. Dorbelar could blast laser spheres from its mouth as well as unleash a tiny airplane-like camera from its chest. The camera had the ability to fire lasers as well as spy on targets through its single lens. Spielban fought with this robot by itself, as well as with Hellvira at the same time. Hellvira at this time having been forced to fight against her will. Once Spielban knocked Hellvira down, this robot was destroyed soon afterwards by his Arc Impulse while he rode Hoverian.
- Electroilar (デンジラー, Denjirā): An electrokinetic robot that can attack with electricity. A robotics professor was visiting the Edison shop with his collection of robots. The robots looked more like oversized toys, except for one that was modeled with the appearance (and strength) of a weightlifter called Samson. Later that night, Electroilar used its electric current to take control of the robots, including the robot strongman. Spielban went to look for the missing robots and found them causing havoc throughout the city. While Spielban battled the robots he tried to reason with Samson, but Electroilar gave it more juice to overpower Spielban. While regrouping at the Edison Shop, Daigorou told Spielban and Diana that the professor grew depressed and went to find his beloved robots on his own. Spielban then disguised himself as a robot for the Waller to capture, but his plan was complicated when the Kinclones found the inventor snooping around and captured him. Spielban removed his disguise and battled Denzilar while Diana took on Samson. Diana was saved when the professor snipped the wires in Samson's head, disabling it. Electroilar still remained but Spielban transported the battle to a rock quarry where it was destroyed by his Arc Impulse. The professor was then reunited with all of his stolen robots, including Samson.
- Wheelder (シャリンダー, Sharindā): A wheel-themed robot that could launch wheel-themed discs and blast lasers from his eyes in battle. The discs he launched matched the theme of the wheels on his body. This robot was used, alongside Shadow, Gasher, and Rikki, to help capture a scientist and his android wife. The android wife was destroyed in battle by Wheelder. Wheelder controlled a humvee-like vehicle of his own which he brought out in battle against Spielban and Diana. First Spielban used the power of Hoverian to destroy the humvee. Then Spielban destroyed this robot with his Arc Impulse whilst riding Hoverian. Afterwards, Spielban and Diana helped the scientist and made sure he would arrive safely to his next destination.
- Sartan (サータン, Sātan): A shaman-like shark-themed robot that had a humanoid and a robotic form. He managed to brainwash a Kiss-like rock group into becoming an assassin group for Waller. This robot fought both Spielban and Diana inside a cave which was set as a trap for them. Later in battle Sartan revealed that he could launch the fin-shaped blade on the top of his head at the heroes, which they managed to destroy. When Sartan was destroyed by Spielban with his Arc Impulse, the spell on everyone he had brainwashed was broken.
- Godolar (ゴドラー, Godorā): A robot with ball-shaped shoulders and hands that could roll up into a ball and attack. It also had the strength to toss heavy boulders. While on Demon Mountain, Spielban and Diana confronted Godolar during a search for a researcher that was last seen near the location by his kids. It was later revealed that the researcher had been kidnapped by Deathzero and the female spy team after he had discovered the Waller's new base. Godolar had been created to guard the Waller's newly built base on Demon Mountain by killing anyone who dared to even approach the place with his vicious traps and weapons. Diana managed to locate the base and destroy it, while Spielban went into battle with Godolar. In battle, Godolar managed to throw heavy boulders on Spielban and pin him down, as well as blast lasers from his eyes. Spielban managed to escape from being pinned and destroy Godolar with his Arc Impulse. After Godolar and the base were destroyed, and Deathzero and the spies retreated, Spielban and Diana helped the two children and their father re-unite in a safer place at a safer time.

==== New Battle Mechanoids ====
The New Battle Mechanoids (ニュー戦闘機械人, Nyū Sentou Kikainin) are a stronger series of Battle Mechanoids created by Emperor Guillowtine. They are capable of speech and are stronger that the original Battle Mechanoids.

- Puncher (パンチャー, Panchā): A jukebox-themed robot who is the first of the New Battle Mechanoids. Guillowtine personally supervised Puncher's construction. After the two kunoichi completed their training, Guillotine presented them with brand new kunai. One of Puncher's abilities was to detach its massive claw on its right arm and launch it at the enemy. The claw could operate separately from the main body and held a tight grasp on Spielban during their battle. After Diana broke free from the Kinclones she joined the fight, but sadly her efforts made no difference. Puncher was powerful, but was eventually destroyed by Spielban.
- Medor (メドー): This robotic creature has a snake tail instead of legs. She was built by Guillotine and Deathzero, who planned to use her as a part of Guillotine's plan against Spielban. Medor could blast arrows from her one, bow-like arm, as well as crack her tail like a whip and bind enemies (like Spielban) with it in battle. Spielban managed to destroy Medor with his Arc Impulse. Spielban figured out later that Medor was not Helen, and that Helen was still alive and out there somewhere for him to find one day.
- Karmilar (カーミラー, Kāmirā): A copper-colored bat-themed robot who was sent, alongside Kinclones, to capture an alien couple who crash landed on Earth. The alien travelers story was much like Spielban and Diana's, which had happened years ago. Spielban managed to rescue the female, while the male was successfully captured by the Waller. Karmilar launched and latched his tentacled tongue onto the spaceman, draining him of his blue-colored blood while storing his robotic bat-like body. The blood was then turned into blue-like stones/pearls that were given to Pandora and used as an offering to the Waller deity. As the alien hostages were being taken back Spielban appeared and rescued them, which lead to him and Diana having a battle with Karmilar, Deathzero, and the Kinclones. After the Kinclones had been taken care of, Spielban fought Karmilar, who attacked by biting him on the neck. Though overwhelming at first, Spielban endured and destroyed this robot with his Arc Impulse.
- Disk (ディスク, Disuku): A CD player-themed robot. This robot helped in the Waller's plot to use CDs, with Pandora's voice, to hypnotize and lure/trap pregnant women into their clutches. The Waller planned to use the babies for their own evil deeds. Diana disguised herself as one of these women and ended up in the same trap as the others before Spielban came to the rescue. After the pregnant women were saved, Spielban and Diana took on the Waller forces and Disk together. Disk could launch/blast discs from his arm/hand in battle, use a giant disc as a shield to reflect attacks made by Spielban and Diana, as well as reflect sunbeams as lasers to blast the heroes. Like many robots before it Disk was eventually destroyed by Spielban's Arc Impulse.
- Offside (オフサイド, Ofusaido): This football-themed robot attacked Diana with the help of Hellvira. With an injured leg, Diana could not withstand the combined onslaught of Hellvira and Offside. When Offside removes the football on its head and kicks it towards his opponents, the ball detonates upon impact. Offside used the football on his head and tried to tackle Spielban repeatedly in battle, both to no avail. Offside was destroyed by Spielban, but Diana was left in critical condition.
- Carman (クルマン, Kuruman): A van-themed robot. After Helen failed to harm Spielban and it was discovered that her transformation remote was no longer working, Carman was sent to destroy Spielban and bring back Helen. Carman could transform between his Battle Mechanoid form as well as take the form of a regular-looking SUV. In regular form, he can blast lasers from his high beams and could produce a force field-like shield to deflect Spielban's attacks. In battle, Spielban managed to blast and destroy this robot's rear-end, which seemed to slow it down long enough to be destroyed by Spielban's Arc Impulse, which Spielban implemented while riding Hoverian.
- Antom (アントム): A bee-themed robot, Antom can spray acidic liquid from its mouth that could destroy anything it touched. Antom could also release miniature robotic bees that stung and electrocuted Spielban, Diana Lady, and Helen Lady, attempting to fry their armor's circuits in the process. Antom can also drill its tongue into a building's foundation to cause it to quake and crumble to pieces. He was destroyed by Spielban's Arc Impulse.
- Ivyara (ツターラ, Tsutara): A walking tree-like robot. He appeared when the Waller Empire's scheme was to turn people/Earthlings into plants. Ivyaraa grew from seedlings that the Kinclones were delivering on unmarked trucks across the city. After he grew he went into battle with Spielban, Diana, and Helen. Tsutarla could launch vines from its mouth and fingers. These vines could bind and shock Spielban and the girls. He was eventually killed by Spielban's Arc Impulse.
- Biker (バイカー, Baikā): A motorcycle-based robot. Emperor Guillowtine had infiltrated a biker gang and planned to use them and this robot, to destroy Spielban for him. Biker could transform between his Battle Mechanoid form as well as take the form of a regular-looking motorcycle. Diana's Lady Sniper did not seem to affect it. Spielban was able to destroy it in battle with his Arc Impulse, which while riding Hoverian.
- Yumepakkun (ユメパックン): A balloon-themed robot. He appeared around Christmas when the Waller Empire's scheme was to use him/his powers to devour the dreams of children. Yumepakkun could release a binding, glowing balloon in battle as well as fire explosive laser spheres. He was eventually destroyed by Spielban's Arc Impulse.
- Shishidon (シシドン): Shishidon is a rollerskate/Chinese guardian lion-themed robot who wore rollerskates and resembled a giant rollerskate. He threw explosive parasol umbrellas at Spielban in battle. In battle, Shishidon could also extend his arms and neck to fit his needs and can blast bladed arrows, mini-missiles and fire from his mouth. Shishidon was used during the Waller Empire's scheme to give Earthlings magic mirrors on New Year's Eve that were supposed to make the Earthlings look beautiful. In reality, these mirrors turned people into mummies, through the use of magic from the deity Waller. Shishidon first appeared in the guise of a kimono lion, hence the name. He was destroyed by Spielban's Arc Impulse.
- Walther (ワルサー, Warusā): A red robot with three yellow eyes and a bazooka-type weapon mounted on his right shoulder. Not fully trusting the Youki's plan, Rikki tried to convince Emperor Guillowtine and General Deathzero to use added measures. After Walther appeared, Youki and the Mumumu pulled back and left Walther to destroy the heroes. Spielban, Diana, and Helen combined their laser blasts in order to weaken him. Spielban then destroyed him with his Arc Impulse.
- Brainder (ブレンダー, Buraindā): A brain-themed robot with its brains on its chest. Youki abducted a couple of scientists and drained their knowledge into the robot so that he could steal a device that the couple had developed for the Empire. The device supposedly contained technology that could boost the Waller's technology, as they had nothing like it at the time. Spielban and Diana combined their laser blasts to destroy the robot's brains, which held the transferred knowledge of the scientists. The scientists gained back their stolen knowledge afterwards. It was destroyed by Spielban's Arc Impulse.
- Youki Battle Mechanoid (ヨウキ戦闘機械人, Youki Sentou Kikaijin): A scrap metal robot created by Youki. Its scrapped body seemed to have previously been that of Dreampacker's since it had Dreampacker's right foot, covered with Blocker's head, Godoilar's body and legs, Sharinder's right arm, Puncher's right arm which was used for a left arm, and Mechaputer's left foot. It attacked only once before it was destroyed by Vacuumer, though it did manage to attack Vacuumer and Deathzero before being reduced back to scrap.
- Vacuumer (バキューマー): A heavy-armored fan-themed robot that can suck anyone toward him or blow them away with gusts from his built-in fans. When Youki rebelled against the Waller and took over the Gamedeath, this robot was summoned to deal with him. It sucked up all of Youki's power and destroyed the Youki Battle Mechanoid. Later, it was sent to destroy Spielban, Diana, and Helen, with Deathzero and his fleet in tow. Spielban destroyed it with his Arc Impulse, soon after confronting it.
- Kumason (クマソン): A green, scaly dragon/lizard-themed robotic creature that was dressed like a samurai warrior. He sought to wield the Legendary Demon Sword. With it, Kumason would become more powerful than Spielban in battle. Eventually, he and Deathzero discovered the "fossilized" sword, but realized it needed electrical energy (lightning) to recharge its power. The granddaughter of the sword's temple keeper used her energy to turn the sword back into a fossil after Spielban saved her. This distraction and the loss of the sword allowed Spielban to destroy the weakened Kumason with his Arc Impulse.
- Movieman (ムーブマン, Moviman): A movie camera-themed robot, Movieman was used in Deathzero's plan to make a film. In the movie Deathzero would win Diana and defeat Spielban. In battle Movieman could blast powerful lasers from his camera lens eye and teleport in flashes of light. Movieman could also create translucent decoy images of himself and bind his opponents with movie reel tentacles. Movieman confronted and captured Diana first before going into battle with Spielban and Helen. Movieman eventually had to battle Spielban, Helen, and Diana after Helen rescued her, but it was destroyed by Spielban's Arc Impulse.
- Blizzer (ブリザー, Burizzā): This robot resembles a walrus. Blizzer had the ability to freeze water pipes as well as freeze his opponents with built-in ice-blowers. To keep from being frozen Spielban, Diana, and Helen were given anti-freeze defense on their armor. Spielban tried to reflect Blizzer's attacks back to him, but Blizzer was also equipped with a flamethrower and melted through the ice. Eventually it was destroyed by Spielban with the help of Diana in the Grand Nasca, who managed to freeze him with his own laser long enough for Spielban to use his Arc Impulse to destroy him.

==== Battle Lifeforms ====
The Battle Lifeforms (戦闘生物, Sentō Seimaitai) are Dr. Bio's monsters created out of organic material. Only a few were produced and near the end of the first half of the series Bio would operate on himself and become a Bio Lifeform.

- Sporeja (グジャ, Suporeja): The first of three Bio Lifeforms. Sporeja is a spore-themed Battle Lifeform that could metamorph itself into green slime for infiltration as well as morph into a flat starfish-like mass to wrap itself around its victims in order to consume them. After eating a human, Sporeja could assume their identity. Sporeja was used to break into a museum and after eating and impersonating a security guard, a diamond was stolen which Pandora used as an offering to the Waller deity. Dr. Bio later upgraded Sporeja with the ability to shoot deadly gas. Spielban was almost eaten, but he finally killed Guja with his Arc Impulse.
- Cottonja (ワタジャ, Wataja): A floating cotton/spore-like organism that emerged from a rose. While conducting his research by the lake Spielban found a sad little girl. She quickly ran off leaving her backpack behind. The backpack had her address and name which revealed that she was the daughter of a renowned scientist. Spielban returned the backpack, but the scientist and his daughter were being held hostage by the Waller. The scientist was forced to conduct experiments for the Waller while his daughter kept him fed and made it appear to the public that everything was alright. Spielban sneaked in to save them, but Deathzero threatened to kill them and forced Spielban to throw down his gun. The scientist mustered his courage and broke free from the Kinclones clutches which allowed Spielban to attack. Wataja had no body and it was difficult for Spielban to land a decent hit. Spielban destroyed it with his Arc Impulse attack.
- Seaja (ウミジャ, Umija): An octopus-based monster and Dr. Bio's final lifeform. Umija was covered in tentacled limbs and was colored bluish grey. Umija was unleashed into the ocean where it would spawn from its arms. Dr. Bio's plan was to infect all the Earthlings with small aquatic parasites called Gujas and Umijas causing the infected person enter the ocean where they would turn into fish people. Spielban went scuba diving and confronted Umija. He told Diana what was going on and she volunteered herself as bait to lure Umija out of the water. Meanwhile, Spielban stumbled into Bio's hidden mountain lab and demolished it with his land vehicle. Diana, meanwhile, was engaged in battle with Umija, who could spit out a sludge-like material from the large opening on its face and Diana was hit by it. Spielban managed to join in the battle and kill the monster. After Umija was destroyed, the victims of the parasites were freed of their manic need for the ocean.

== Episode list ==
1. A Shocking Pair! The Crystallized Combination! (ペアでドッキリ! コンビで結晶, Pea de Dokkiri! Konbi de Kesshō) (Original Airdate: April 7, 1986): written by Shozo Uehara, directed by Makoto Tsuji
2. Goodbye Mama! The Two Hightech Heroes (グッバイ・ママ! 二人はハイテクヒーロー, Gubbai・Mama! Futari wa Haitekku Hīrō) (Original Airdate: April 14, 1986): written by Shozo Uehara, directed by Makoto Tsuji
3. Hello Earth: The Blue Seas' Adam & Eve (ハロー・地球 青い海のアダムとイブ, Harō・Chikyū Aoi Umi no Adamu to Ibu) (Original Airdate: April 21, 1986): written by Shozo Uehara, directed by Takeshi Ogasawara
4. Angel or Devil? the Masked Girl Hellvira (エンゼル? 悪魔? 少女仮面ヘルバイラ, Enzeru? Akuma? Shōjo Kamen Herubaira) (Original Airdate: April 28, 1986): written by Shozo Uehara, directed by Takeshi Ogasawara
5. Further Than Planets... An Older Sister and Her Young Brother (惑星よりも遠い…姉・そして弟, Wakusei yori mo Tōi... Ane・Soshite Otōto) (Original Airdate: May 5, 1986): written by Shozo Uehara, directed by Makoto Tsuji
6. The Combat Creature's Strange Cells (戦闘生物のふしぎ細胞, Sentō Seibutsu no Fushigi Saibō) (Original Airdate: May 19, 1986): written by Shozo Uehara, directed by Makoto Tsuji
7. The Kinclon Dance on the Mermaid Island (キンクロンも踊りだす人魚島, Kinkuron mo Odoridasu Ningyoshima) (Original Airdate: May 26, 1986): written by Shozo Uehara, directed by Takeshi Ogasawara
8. Diana's Wrath・Tears・Smile (ダイアナの怒り・涙・ほほえみ, Daiana no Ikari・Namida・Hohoemi) (Original Airdate: June 2, 1986): written by Shozo Uehara, directed by Takeshi Ogasawara
9. Helen is...!? My Wrath is About to Explode (ヘレンが……?! おれの怒りは爆発寸前, Heren ga .....?! Ore no Ikari wa Bakuhatsu Sunzen) (Original Airdate: June 9, 1986): written by Shozo Uehara, directed by Michio Konishi
10. Shock, Gulp! The Beauty-Beauty's Robot (ドッキリゴックン・ビジョジョロボット, Dokkiri Gukkun・Bijojo Robotto) (Original Airdate: June 16, 1986): written by Shozo Uehara, directed by Michio Konishi
11. Strange Robot Gunman (へんてこりんなロボットガンマン, Hentekorin na Robotto Ganman) (Original Airdate: June 23, 1986): written by Shozo Uehara, directed by Takeshi Ogasawara
12. The Futuristic House Sad Puppies (未来ハウスのかなしい子犬たち, Mirai Hausu no Kanashii Koinu-tachi) (Original Airdate: June 30, 1986): written by Shozo Uehara, directed by Takeshi Ogasawara
13. Do Your Best Papa! The Mini-Mama's Sunny-Side Up Eggs (パパがんばれ! ちびっ子ママの目玉焼き, Papa Ganbare! Chibikko Mama no Medama Yaki) (Original Airdate: July 7, 1986): written by Shozo Uehara, directed by Michio Konishi
14. That Planet is a Map of Our Tomorrow! (あの星がおれたちのあしたの地図だよ, Ano Hoshi ga Ore-tachi no Ashita no Chizu da yo!) (Original Airdate: July 14, 1986): written by Shozo Uehara, directed by Michio Konishi
15. It is the Sea! The Shining Sun, a Wink and a Gulp (海だ! 太陽ギラギラ ウインクゴックン, Umi da! Taiyō Giragira Uinku Gokkun) (Original Airdate: July 21, 1986): written by Shozo Uehara, directed by Takeshi Ogasawara
16. Waller Lurks in Loose Layers of Earth (ワーラーがひそむブクブク地底湖, Wārā ga Hisomu Gukuguku Chiteiko) (Original Airdate: July 28, 1986): written by Shozo Uehara, directed by Takeshi Ogasawara
17. A Maze Gamezone (迷宮のゲームゾーン, Meikyū no Gēmu Zōn) (Original Airdate: August 4, 1986): written by Shozo Uehara, directed by Yoshiaki Kobayashi
18. A Bright Rainbow Bridge in a Cup (コップの中に光る虹の橋, Koppu no Naka ni Hikaru Niji no Hashi) (Original Airdate: August 11, 1986): written by Shozo Uehara and Yoshiaki Kobayashi, directed by Yoshiaki Kobayashi
19. A Dangerous Technique Hidden in a Circuit (ハッとする危険回路のかくしワザ, Hatto suru Kiken Kairo no Kakushi Waza) (Original Airdate: August 18, 1986): written by Shozo Uehara, directed by Michio Konishi
20. Love and Sadness of a Cyborg (愛と哀しみの人造人間, Ai to Kanashimi no Jinzō Ningen) (Original Airdate: August 25, 1986): written by Shozo Uehara, directed by Michio Konishi
21. The Queen Sings to the Devil in F Minor (女王が歌う悪魔のヘ短調, Joō ga Utau Akuma no Hetanch ō) (Original Airdate: September 1, 1986): written by Shozo Uehara, directed by Takeshi Ogasawara
22. A Black Mass With an Opera Beat (黒ミサはカゲキなビートで, Kuro Misa wa Kageki na Bīto de) (Original Airdate: September 8, 1986): written by Shozo Uehara, directed by Takeshi Ogasawara
23. A Brother and Sister Race Through the Legendary Demon Mountain (兄と妹が鬼伝説の山を走る, Ani to Imōto ga Oni Densetsu no Yama o Hashiru) (Original Airdate: September 15, 1986): written by Shō Aikawa, directed by Michio Konishi
24. From the Year 2201 Comes Emperor Guillotine (2201年から来たギローチン皇帝, Ni Sen Ni Hyaku Ichi Nen kara Kita Girōchin Kōtei) (Original Airdate: September 22, 1986): written by Shozo Uehara, directed by Michio Konishi
25. The Newly Made Emperor's New Mechanoid Presses Near the End (皇帝製のニュー機械人がギリギリに迫る, Kōteisei no Niyūkikaijin ga Girigiri ni Semaru) (Original Airdate: October 13, 1986): written by Shozo Uehara, directed by Takeshi Ogasawara
26. The Second Helen Tears Off Her Loving Heart (二人ヘレンが愛の心を引きちぎる, Futari Heren ga Ai no Kokoro o Hikichigiru) (Original Airdate: October 20, 1986): written by Shozo Uehara, directed by Takeshi Ogasawara
27. The Poison Fang Which Tries to Suck the Blood of the Beautiful Runaway (美しき逃亡者を急襲する吸血毒牙, Utsukushiki Tōbōsha o Kyūshū suru Kyūin Dokuga)(Original Airdate: October 27, 1986): written by Kazuho Takizawa, directed by Michio Konishi
28. Good Day, Baby; a 23rd Century Lesson (赤ちゃんこんにちは・23世紀レッスン, Akachan Konnichi wa・Nijūsan Seiki Ressun) (Original Airdate: November 3, 1986): written by Shozo Uehara, directed by Michio Konishi
29. 1 Plus 1 Equals 5? Diana Smash Plan (1+1＝5? ダイアナつぶし作戦, Ichi Tasu Ichi wa Go? Daiana Tsubushi Sakusen) (Original Airdate: November 17, 1986): written by Shozo Uehara, directed by Takeshi Ogasawara
30. A Tearful Reunion, And Doctor Bio is... (涙の再会、そしてドクターバイオは…, Namida no Saikai, Soshite Dokutā Baio wa...) (Original Airdate: November 24, 1986): written by Shozo Uehara, directed by Takeshi Ogasawara
31. Tokyo is Sinking! Third Crystallize Helen Lady (東京が沈む! 三人結晶ヘレンレディ, Tōkyō ga Shizumu! Sannin Kesshō Heren Redi) (Original Airdate: December 1, 1986): written by Shozo Uehara, directed by Michio Konishi
32. Return Mama! Frightful Green Panic (ママをもどして! 恐怖の緑パニック, Mama o Modoshite! Kyōfu no Midori Panikku) (Original Airdate: December 8, 1986): written by Yasushi Ichikawa, directed by Michio Konishi
33. Don't Stop! The Roar of the Destructive Bike Gang (止まらない! 爆走する破壊バイク部隊, Tomaranai! Bakusō suru Hakai Baiku Butai) (Original Airdate: December 15, 1986): written by Shozo Uehara, directed by Takeshi Ogasawara
34. All Happiness・Packer Doesn't Provide the Dream (まんぷくりん・夢をパックンしないでね, Manpukurin・Yume o Pakkun Shinai de ne) (Original Airdate: December 22, 1986): written by Shozo Uehara, directed by Takeshi Ogasawara
35. Waller's New Year's Gift; The Beautifying Mirror (ワーラーのお年玉・美人になるカガミ, Wārā no Otoshidama・Bijin ni Naru Kagami) (Original Airdate: January 5, 1987): written by Shozo Uehara, directed by Yoshiharu Tomita
36. Mumumu! Waller's New War Potential: Youki? (ムムム! ワーラー新戦力＝ヨウキ?, Mumumu! Wārā Shinsenryoku: Yōki) (Original Airdate: January 12, 1987): written by Shozo Uehara, directed by Yoshiharu Tomita
37. Drumroll! Youki's Manipulating Devil Dance (どろどろん! ヨウキに踊ろう悪魔ダンス, Dorodoron! Yōki ni Odorou Akuma Dansu) (Original Airdate: January 19, 1987): written by Shozo Uehara, directed by Takeshi Ogasawara
38. You've Been Defeated!? Papa & Mama Mechanoid Counterattack (君は倒せるか?! パパママ機械人の逆襲!, Kimi wa Taoseru ka?! Papa Mama Kikaijin no Gyakushū) (Original Airdate: January 26, 1987): written by Noboru Sugimura, directed by Takeshi Ogasawara
39. The Queen Paints an Unexpected Trick (ウラワザ どんでん女王がえし, Urawaza Donden Joō ga Eshi) (Original Airdate: February 2, 1987): written by Shozo Uehara, directed by Yoshiharu Tomita
40. The Girl Watches! The Duel of the Beam Sword VS The Legendary Demon Sword (少女は見た! 光線剣VS伝説魔剣の決闘, Shōjo wa Mita! Kōsenken tai Densetsu Maken no Kettō) (Original Airdate: February 9, 1987): written by Noboru Sugimura, directed by Yoshiharu Tomita
41. Who is the Lead Performer!? Plans Made by the Dream Factory (主役は誰だ?! 仕組まれた夢工場, Shuyaku wa Dare da?! Shikumareta Yume Kōjō) (Original Airdate: February 16, 1987): written by Noboru Sugimura, directed by Toshihiro Ito
42. The Commander-in-Chief's Assault! The 100,000 Volt Final Circuit (大将軍の突撃! 100万ボルトの究極回路, Daishōgun no Totsugeki! Hyakuman Boruto no Kyūkyoku Kairo) (Original Airdate: February 23, 1987): written by Shozo Uehara, directed by Toshihiro Ito
43. Last Stand! Breaking into Waller Castle (決戦! ワーラー城突入!, Kessen! Wārā Shiro Totsunyū) (Original Airdate: March 2, 1987): written by Shozo Uehara, directed by Michio Konishi
44. Now You Know! Planet Clin's Secret (いま君は知る! クリン星の秘密, Ima Kimi wa Shiru! Kurinsei no Himitsu) (Original Airdate: March 9, 1987): written by Shozo Uehara, directed by Michio Konishi

== Cast ==
- Spielban: Hiroshi Watari
  - Spielban (child): Makoto Tanimoto
- Diana: Makoto Sumikawa
  - Diana (child): Mika Kawada
- Helen: Naomi Morinaga
  - Helen (child): Emi Kamiya
- Doctor Ben/Dr. Bio: Ichirou Mizuki
- Anna: Rachel Huggett
- Marin: Maria Hernandez
- Pandora: Machiko Soga
- Emperor Guillotine: Mickey Curtis
- Rikki: Michiko Nishiwaki
- Shadow: Chiemi Terato
- Gasher: Mako Yamashina
- Youki: Masahiro Sudou
- Captain: Satoshi Kurihara

=== Voice cast ===
- Deathzero: Shōzō Iizuka
- Narrator: Tōru Ōhira

== Songs ==
Opening theme

- "Jikuu Senshi Spielban" (時空戦士スピルバン, Jikū Senshi Supiruban)
  - Lyrics: Keisuke Yamakawa
  - Composition & Arrangement: Michiaki Watanabe
  - Artist: Ichirou Mizuki

Ending themes

- "Kimi no Nakama da Spielban" (君の仲間だスピルバン, Kimi no Nakama da Supiruban; "Your Friend Spielban")
  - Lyrics: Keisuke Yamakawa
  - Composition & Arrangement: Michiaki Watanabe
  - Artist: Ichiro Mizuki
  - Episodes: 1-10
- "Kesshō da! Spielban" (結晶だ！スピルバン, Kesshō da! Supiruban; "Crystallize! Spielban")
  - Lyrics: Shōzō Uehara (上原 正三, Uehara Shōzō)
  - Composition & Arrangement: Michiaki Watanabe
  - Artist: Ichiro Mizuki
  - Episodes: 11-44

== International broadcasts and home video ==
- In its home country of Japan, a compilation of episodes were released on VHS by Toei Video on June 12, 1987. Toei Video gave the entire series a DVD release from February 21, 2005, to August 5, 2005, spread across four volumes. Each volume contains two discs with 11 episodes.
- In Thailand, the series was aired as Space Knight Spielban (อัศวินอวกาศสปิลบัน Xạṣ̄win Xwkāṣ̄ S̄pilbạn) with a Thai dub on Channel 7 twice. Once in 1988 and again in 1991-1992. Video Square had the rights to the home video release at that time.
- In France, the series was shown as Spielvan and premiered on March 28, 1988, on TF1 channel being part of the Club Dorothée block lineup with a French dub produced by AB Groupe with dubbing work by SOFRECI. All episodes were dubbed in French with the exception of the fourth episode which was not dubbed.
- In Brazil, this series was named Jaspion 2 after the success of Juspion (Jaspion in the dub), much like was done to the Super Sentai series that succeeded Choudenshi Bioman in France. However, the main hero was always called Spielvan in the dub.
- In the Philippines, Spielban was aired on ABS-CBN from 1989 to 1990 with an English dub, but it re-aired on IBC-13 in the mid-1990's with a Tagalog dub.
- In South Korea, it was released on VHS in 1989 with a Korean dub by Daeyoung Panda as Cyborg Spielban (싸이보그 스필반) and was the first Metal Hero series to be officially released in the region.

== Other appearances ==
The costumes for Tsutarla, Biker, and Walther were used in cameo appearances in the first episode of Choujinki Metalder. Tsutarla's head and shoulder branches were removed where its costume appears as a background member of the Monster Army. Biker and Walther's costumes were used to portray background members of the Mechanical Army.
