= Jikuu Keisatsu Wecker =

- Created by: Kazuya Hatazawa, LayUp
- Starring: Megumi Amano; Mieko Tsuchiya; Miku Kuryuu; Hiroshi Watari
- Country of origin: Japan
- No. of episodes: 3

Related
- Jikuu Keisatsu Wecker D-02

Jikuu Keisatsu Wecker (時空警察ヴェッカー, Jikū Keisatsu Vekkā; translated as Chrono Police Wecker) refers to both a Japanese direct-to-video Tokusatsu Heroine production as well as a series of similar programs from the producers of Rosetta: The Masked Angel and Vanny Knights. The original Jikuu Keisatsu Wecker was initially released on DVD on June 21, 2001. It was followed by Jikuu Keisatsu Wecker D-02 which aired on TV Asahi from January 10 to March 28, 2002. The third Wecker series is titled Jikuu Keisatsu Wecker Signa and aired on Tokyo MX from July 6 to September 21, 2007. The film Jikuu Keisatsu Hyperion was released in July 2009 and serves as both a prequel and a sequel to Wecker Signa. For the tenth anniversary, the stage production Jikuu Keisatsu Wecker SIGHT and the film Jikuu Keisatsu Wecker Deadly Night Shade were released in 2011.

The series follow a group of young women who are police officers over the flow of time, and are usually led by a male investigator while they fight various monsters while in hi-tech suits.
