= Emi Shinohara =

Japanese voice actress (1963–2024)

- 篠原 恵美
- Born: Emiko Shinohara; August 8, 1963; Fukushima Prefecture, Japan
- Died: September 8, 2024 (aged 61)
- Other names: Emiko Watanabe (渡邊 恵美子, Watanabe Emiko; married name)
- Occupation: Voice actress
- Years active: 1986–2024
- Agent: 81 Produce
- Notable credit(s): Sailor Moon as Sailor Jupiter; Naruto as Kushina Uzumaki
- Spouse: Hiroshi Watari
- Children: 1

Emiko Shinohara (Japanese: 篠原 恵美子, Hepburn: Shinohara Emiko; August 8, 1963 – September 8, 2024), known professionally as Emi Shinohara (篠原 恵美, Shinohara Emi), was a Japanese voice actress from Fukushima Prefecture. At the time of her death, she was affiliated with 81 Produce. She was best known for voicing Sailor Jupiter in the first anime adaptation of Sailor Moon, Kaho Mizuki in Cardcaptor Sakura and its sequel Cardcaptor Sakura: Clear Card, and Kushina Uzumaki in Naruto: Shippuden. She was married to tokusatsu actor Hiroshi Watari, best known for playing the titular hero in Space Sheriff Sharivan.

== Biography ==
Shinohara was born in Fukushima Prefecture on August 8, 1963, and raised in Ueda, Nagano. (Note: While Anime News Network says she was born in Nagano Prefecture, most sources say she was born in Fukushima Prefecture.) She joined the drama and choir clubs during her later years in elementary school. Since junior high school, she had always wanted to become an actor, and after graduating from Ueda High School, she thought that "singing can also be a way to study acting", and she was subsequently educated at the Kunitachi College of Music Department of Music Education. While at the college, she joined an off-campus club and performed in musicals.

While aiming to become an actress, she joined a study group called Voice Arts, and she took part in an audition at the invitation of sound director Yasunori Honda, who was a teacher of hers at Voice Arts, and passed, and she was cast as B-ko Daitokuji in the 1986 film Project A-ko. Subsequently, she joined Arts Vision and then 81 Produce.

In 1992, Shinohara began starring as Sailor Jupiter, one of the major characters in the first anime adaptation of Sailor Moon. According to Megan Peters of ComicBook.com, Shinohara's "work on Sailor Moon helped kickstart one of anime's most magical stories" and she "brought that headstrong performance to life with ease." In addition to Sailor Jupiter, she also voiced other background characters.

In addition to Sailor Jupiter, she also voiced Presea in Magic Knight Rayearth, Kaho Mizuki in Cardcaptor Sakura, Yayoi Matsunaga in Nightwalker: The Midnight Detective, Charlotte Elbourne in Vampire Hunter D: Bloodlust (2000), Yōko Mizuno in Maria-sama ga Miteru, Ophelia in Claymore, and Kushina Uzumaki in Naruto: Shippuden. She also voiced Agarte Lindblum in the video game Tales of Rebirth and Bakuryū Pteranodon in the tokusatsu series Bakuryū Sentai Abaranger. She would often voice "older sister" or "mother" characters in anime. In the last few years of her career, she reprised her role as Kaho in the 2018 sequel series Cardcaptor Sakura: Clear Card, and she voiced Sachiko in the 2020 film A Whisker Away.

She released three albums through Apollon (now Bandai Music Entertainment): Windows (1994), Street (1994), and Ashita e (1996). In 1997, she released another album from Nippon Columbia, Missing Piece.

Her husband was tokusatsu actor Hiroshi Watari. She had an older brother. She also shared the same birth date as her Sailor Moon co-star Rika Fukami, and they even had a joint birthday concert together, performing as the duo Funky Twins on their 33rd birthday in 1996. She also worked at Senzoku Gakuen College of Music as a voice acting and anison teacher.

== Death ==
Shinohara died on September 8, 2024, at the age of 61. Undergoing treatment for an unspecified illness at the time, she reportedly had recently been on a respirator and wheelchair and some of her bones had fractured. Sailor Moon creator Naoko Takeuchi and her husband, YuYu Hakusho and Hunter × Hunter creator Yoshihiro Togashi both drew Sailor Jupiter as a tribute to Shinohara.

== Filmography ==
=== Animated television ===
Year	Work	Role	Source
1986	Dream Hunter Rem	Elizabeth	
1988	Sonic Soldier Borgman	Haruka Misaki	
1989	Akuma-kun	Lilith	
1989	Dragon Quest	Queen, Martina	
1990	Iczer Reborn	Candy	
1991	The Twins at St. Clare's	Wella	
1992	Jeanie with the Light Brown Hair	Margaret	
1992	Master Keaton	Sofia	
1992–1997	Sailor Moon	Makoto Kino/Sailor Jupiter, Kyurene (ep. 6), Jumeau (ep. 18)	
1993	Miracle Girls	Kanako (Kana-chan)	
1993	Mobile Suit Victory Gundam	Maria Pia Armonia	
1993	Super Bikkuriman	Mecha Turtle	
1994	Crayon Shin-chan	Sailor Bakaan	
1994	Ghost Sweeper Mikami	Female teacher	
1994	Jungle King Tar-chan	Dorothy	
1994	Magic Knight Rayearth	Presea and Sierra	
1994	Metal Fighter Miku	Youko Shibano	
1996	Case Closed	Noriko Okatani	
1997	Burn-Up Excess	Ruby	
1997	Hakugei: Legend of the Moby Dick	Sarah	
1997	Kindaichi Case Files	Ruiko Sakuragi	
1997	Lupin III: Island of Assassins	Ellen	
1997	Twilight of the Dark Master	Shizuka Tachibana	
1998	Cardcaptor Sakura	Kaho Mizuki	
1998	Nightwalker	Yayoi Matsunaga	
1998	Shima Shima Tora no Shimajirō	Sakura Shimano (ep. 205 - 230)	
1998	Sentimental Journey	Aoi	
1998	Sorcerous Stabber Orphen	Azalie Cait Sith	
1998	The Adventures of Mini-Goddess	Kodama	
1999	The Big O	Angel	
2000	Ceres, Celestial Legend	Miori's mother	
2001	Banner of the Stars	Lala Shangal	
2001	Hajime no Ippo	Mari Īmura	
2001	Kaze no Yojimbo	Sanae Araki	
2001	Najica Blitz Tactics	XXX	
2001	Noir	Marennes	
2003–2004	Maburaho	Karei Hirozaki	
2003	Saiyuki Reload	Suika	
2003	Space Pirate Captain Herlock	Shizuka Namio	
2003	UFO Ultramaiden Valkyrie	Princess Mehm	
2004	Fafner in the Azure	Chizuru Toomi	
2004	Maria-sama ga Miteru	Yōko Mizuno	
2005	Hell Girl	Namiko Todaka	
2005–2006	Honey and Clover	Mitsuko Aida	
2005	Immortal Grand Prix	Michiru Satomi	
2005	Karin	Carrera Marker	
2005	Loveless	Katsuko-sensei	
2006	Ah! My Goddess	Kodama	
2006	Nana	Ms. Sakagami	
2007	Claymore	Ophelia	
2007	Naruto: Shippuden	Kushina Uzumaki	
2007	Shigurui	Iku	
2009	Umineko no Naku Koro ni	Natsuhi Ushiromiya	
2010	Toaru Majutsu no Index II	Misuzu Misaka	
2012	Smile PreCure!	Shizuko Aoki	
2017	Little Witch Academia	Lotte's mother	
2018	Cardcaptor Sakura: Clear Card	Kaho Mizuki	
2018	Oshiri Tantei	Moko Benii	
2022	Shikimori's Not Just a Cutie	Izumi Motoko	

=== Animated film ===
Year	Work	Role	Source
1986	Project A-Ko	B-Ko Daitokuji	
1993	Ninja Scroll	Kagero	
1993	Sailor Moon R: The Movie	Makoto Kino/Sailor Jupiter	
1994	Sailor Moon S: The Movie	Makoto Kino/Sailor Jupiter	
1994	Soreike! Anpanman: Lyrical Magical Mahō no Gakkō	Mimi	
1995	Sailor Moon SuperS: The Movie	Makoto Kino/Sailor Jupiter	
1996	X	Arashi Kishū	
1997	Perfect Blue	Eri Ochiai	
2000	Vampire Hunter D: Bloodlust	Charlotte Elbourne	
2000	Cardcaptor Sakura Movie 2: The Sealed Card	Kaho Mizuki	
2000	Pokémon the Movie 2000	Computer	
2004	Appleseed	Dr. Gilliam Knute	
2018	Engimon	Nami Amanogawa	
2020	A Whisker Away	Sachiko Hinode	
2022	Case Closed: The Culprit Hanzawa	Ikumi Soda	

=== Original video animation ===
Year	Work	Role	Source
1989	Angel Cop		
1990	AD Police Files	Venessa Buck	
1990	Cyber City Oedo 808	Remi Masuda	
1991	Detonator Orgun	Yoko Mitsurugi	
1991	Kekko Kamen	Kekko Kamen	
1992	Hayō no Tsurugi	Cheriku, Ouhi	
1992	Oz	Android 1030	
1992	Ruri-iro Princess	Mother	
1993	Moldiver	Isabelle	
1993	Please Save My Earth	Mokuren	
1993	The Cockpit	Marchenna	
1994	B.B. Fish	Sara Kannazuki	
1994	Tokyo Babylon	Mirei	
1994	Otaku no Seiza: An Adventure in the Otaku Galaxy	Yun	
1995	Miyuki-chan in Wonderland	The Mad Hatter	
1995	Iczer Girl Iczelion	Iczelion	
1996	Mutant Turtles: Superman Legend	April O'Neil	
1997	Saber Marionette J Again	Panther	
1999	Harlock Saga	Freya	
2003	Submarine 707	Miyuki Hayami	
2016–2017	Tenchi Muyo! Ryo-Ohki 4	Tennyo Masaki	
2021	Tenchi Muyo! Ryo-Ohki 5	Tennyo Masaki	
2023	Fafner in the Azure: Behind the Line	Chizuru Tōmi	

=== Tokusatsu ===
Year	Work	Role	Source
2003–2004	Bakuryū Sentai Abaranger	Bakuryū Pteranodon	

=== Video games ===
Year	Work	Role	Source
1997	Ayakashi Ninden Kunoichiban	Tsubura Ise	
1998	Princess Quest	Prince Tapioca	
2003	Star Ocean: Till the End of Time	Mirage Koas	
2004	Tales of Rebirth	Agarte Lindblum	
2004	Stella Deus: The Gate of Eternity	Nebula	
2005	Romancing SaGa	Barbara	
2005	Mabino X Style	Mary Nenem Kinoshita	
2006	Wrestle Angels: Survivor	Panther Risako and Royal Hojo	
2007	Snow Portable	Sayori Yukizuki	
2008	Wrestle Angels: Survivor 2	Panther Risako and Royal Hojo	
2010	Solatorobo: Red the Hunter	Merveille Million	
2014	Naruto Shippuden: Ultimate Ninja Storm Revolution	Kushina Uzumaki	
2015	Robot Girls Z Online	Emperor Ryuma	
2016	Naruto Shippuden: Ultimate Ninja Storm 4	Kushina Uzumaki	
2019	A Certain Magical Index: Imaginary Fest	Misuzu Misaka	
2024	Mobile Suit Gundam U.C. Engage	Maria Pia Armonia	

=== Dubbing ===
==== Live-action ====
- 54 – Anita Randazzo (Salma Hayek)
- Black Beauty – Mrs. Winthorp (Claire Forlani)
- Blackjack – Cinder James (Kam Heskin)
- Charlie and the Chocolate Factory (2008 NTV edition) – Mrs. Beauregarde (Missi Pyle)
- The Comebacks – Barb Fields (Melora Hardin)
- Hollow Man – Dr. Sarah Kennedy (Kim Dickens)
- Léon: The Professional (1996 TV Asahi edition) – Mathilda Lando (Natalie Portman)
- Melinda and Melinda – Laurel (Chloë Sevigny)
- Rumble in the Bronx – Nancy (Françoise Yip)
- The Guest – Laura Peterson (Sheila Kelley)
- Trainspotting – Diane Coulston (Kelly Macdonald)
- T2 Trainspotting – Diane Coulston (Kelly Macdonald)

== Discography ==
=== Albums ===
Title	Year	Details	Peak chart positions		Sales	Ref.
Title	Year	Details	JPN	JPN Comb.	Sales	Ref.
Windows (stylized in all-caps)	1994	Released: February 21, 1994; Label: Apollon	—	—	—	
Street (stylized in all-caps)	1994	Released: September 21, 1994; Label: Apollon	—	—	—	
Ashita e (明日へ)	1996	Released: January 21, 1996; Label: Apollon	—	—	—	
Missing Piece (stylized as Missing piece)	1997	Released: September 20, 1997; Label: Nippon Columbia	—	—	—	
