= Ryo Shihono =

Japanese gravure idol and actress

- しほの 涼
- Born: 7 September 1991 (age 34); Kanagawa Prefecture, Japan
- Occupations: Gravure idol; actress; voice actress; singer
- Years active: 2003–2017
- Height: 172 cm (5 ft 8 in)
- Spouse: Unknown (m. 2018)
- Children: 1

Ryo Shihono (しほの 涼, Shihono Ryō; born 7 September 1991) is a former Japanese gravure idol and former actress. She was born from Kanagawa Prefecture.

== Biography ==
She debuted in 2003. At that time as a junior high school student, her gravure was covered by a lot of young and junior idol magazines.

As an actress she has performed television dramas and theatrical public appearances and has also appeared in numerous films such as direct-to-video films.

She was a member of the entertainer women's futsal team "Team Spazio" (no history) from 12 December 2006 until 29 April 2008. In her singing activities, in addition to the solo "Ryo Shihono", in the name of Reiko Fuyuki in Signaly's, Ami in Cream Lemon, Satori Minato in Lemon Angel Project to have.

After graduating from school when she was in the fourth grade of elementary school, she graduated from the First Senior High School in March 2010 after leaving the middle school and consistent school. She entered Kanto Gakuin University in April 2010. Initially she had a hesitation as to whether to go on to school, but she decided to advance to school with her family's recommendation. Because there were times when she could not attend junior and senior high school, she had priority on her student life after entrance to university, and was shrinking entertainment activities.

From September to December 2013, she temporarily abandoned her entertainment activities and studied in Canada.

It was reported on her official blog that she graduated from college in March 2014.

On 2 June 2017 she announced her retirement from the entertainment activity on her official blog update, and finished performing arts activities with an event held on 22 July.

On 7 October 2018, she announced her marriage with a man on her official blog. On 9 July 2019, she gave birth to her first baby girl.

== Filmography ==
=== Films ===
- Shibuya Kaidan: The Real Toshi Densetsu Episode 4: Lead role [Director: Osamu Fukutani] (Jan 2006 Shibuya Cine La Set)
- Kowai Warabeuta: Hyō no Shō [Director: Osamu Fukutani] (Jul 2007 Theatre Shinjuku)
- Kramer case1 [Director: Ososhi Kaneko] (Apr 2008 Kineka Omori)
- Hakari-goto: Lead role [Director: Sachie Miyagawa] (Jul 2008 Shibuya Uplink Factory)
- Dare mo Shinanai [Director: Mr. first directorial work] Takashi Murakami produced work (Dec 2008 Shimokitazawa Tri Wood Akihabara UDX Theater)
- Jikuu Keisatsu Hyperion semi-starring [Director: Kazuya Hatazawa] (May 2009)
- Kemuri o meguru Bōken [Director: Takeki Akimoto] (published 2010)
- Real Kakurenbo 3 [Director: Hiroki Iwasawa] (published 2010)

=== Stage ===
- Shuji Terayama: Kagekinaru Shissō (Kinokuniya Hall, Aug 2007)
- Kin Iro Yorumata no Gyakushū (Ikebukuro Auru Supotto, Mar 2008)
- Konton Club image2 (Shinjuku Theater Sun Mall, Apr 2010)
- Jikuu Keisatsu Wecker SIGHT (Shibuya Ward Cultural Center Owada, Feb 2011)
- Alice in Project Line (7 Aug 2011, Ginza Hakuhinkan Theater) – as Miyoko Kanoka (daily guest)
- Tennessee Waltz (28 Feb – 4 Mar 2012, Nakameguro Kinkero Theater)

=== TV dramas ===
- Sexy Voice and Robo (19 Jun 2007 (Final Episode), NTV) – schoolgirl
- Jikuu Keisatsu Wecker Signa (6 Jul 2007 – Tokyo MX) – Reina Fuyuki / Signa Lenary
- Kētai Shōjo (5 Oct 2007 – ) – Masaya Sueno
- Taisetsunakoto wa subete Kimi ga Oshiete kureta (CX, Jan 2011 – ) – Yoko

=== Radio ===
- Ryo Shihono no All Night Nippon R (OBC, Jan – 2 Oct 2006)
- Ryo Shihono no Lemon na 14 (NBS, 7 Oct 2006)

=== As a voice actress ===
- Lemon Angel Project (as Satori Minato)
- Cream Lemon (as Ami)
- Bicycle Thieves (semi-lead = as Bruno)
- The Sisters (Tsukuba TV) main chairperson
- Purupuru Untouchable (ABC) monthly guest
- Buruburu Untouchable (ABC) monthly guest
- Dengeki TV! America Zarigani (TBS) guest

=== Direct-to-video ===
- Jitsuroku Kaidan-shi Nen ( Sae Ninomiya) [Sep 2005 Nippon Media Supply]
- Lemon Angel: Jissha-ban (Erika) [Feb 2006 Full Media/Frontier Works]
- Maid na Ryo-chan (Jan 2006, Layfull) lead role
- Police na Ryo-chan (Mar 2006, Layfull) lead role
- Nurse na Ryo-chan (May 2006, Layfull) lead role
- Bit Bullet (Dec 2008 – Feb 2009, Bunkasha)
- Ghost Revenger JK (6 Oct 2010, directed by Seijiro Maejima, Albatross) protagonist as Junko Kinoshita
- Kunekune (29 Oct 2010, directed by Hisaki Yoshikawa, Ammo 98)
- Idol Bakudan (6 Apr 2011, Albatross)

=== Advertisements ===
- WeKey Toyama (Apr–Jun 2008)

== Works ==
=== Co-starring ===
- Dōkyūsei (Sep 2006, Shinkosha) ISBN 4778103025*Co-star: Mina Kurata
- Bishōjo Mizugi Zukan <My Way Mook> (Aug 2007, My Way Publication) ISBN 978-4861353581
- Bishōjo Mizugi Zukan part2 (Oct 2008, My Way Publication)
- Tokyo Slits (Feb 2009, Power Shovel)

=== Photo albums ===
- 1st Ryō omoi (Feb 2005, Shinkosha) ISBN 4778100948
- 2nd Kata omoi (Jul 2005, Shinkosha) ISBN 4778101324
- 3rd Tokyo Ryōkei (Dec 2005, Shinkosha) ISBN 4778101871
- 4th Ryo14: Shunkan Ryōkan <My Way Mook> (Mar 2006, My Way Publication, Shooting: Seita Ando) ISBN 4861352223
- 5th Record (30 Jun 2006, Core Magazine, Shooting: Sadahiro Aida) ISBN 4877349162
- 6th 15's way to grow up (Jan 2007, Shinkosha) ISBN 9784778103453
- 7th Ryo Season: Sotsugyō <My Way Mook> (Mar 2007, My Way Publication, Shooting: Seita Ando) ISBN 978-4861353178
- 8th Haru Saku Suzuka <My Way Mook> (Apr 2008, My Way Publication, Shooting: Sadahiro Aida)
- 9th Shōjo-bako <My Way Mook> (Jan 2009, My Way Publication, Compilation: Moecco Editorial Department) ISBN 978-4861355325
- 10th Adul Teen <sabra DVD mook> (Oct 2009, Shogakukan, Shooting: Seiji Yano) ISBN 978-4091030795
- 11th Love is (Mar 2014, Shogakukan, Shooting: Andy Chao) ISBN 978-4096820896
- 12th La La Last (Jun 2017, Shogakukan, Shooting: Yuichi Sato)

=== DVD ===
(*)Titles in bold have Blu-ray disc versions

- Ryo Shihono 12-Sai (Milkypop DVD) (debut work)
- Fantastic Arival Vol.3 (Love Girl's Mix & Milkypop)
- Snappy! (Shinkosha Feb 2005)
- Suzukaze (Shinkosha, Jul 2005)
- Yokohama Ryōkei (Shinkosha Dec 2005)
- innosent smile (Imax, Apr 2006)
- Ukulele (Square Enix Jul 2006)
- Shishun Ryokō (Shinkosha Sep 2006) [Co-starring Mina Kurata]
- Kami Hikōki (Task visual Nov 2006)
- Early Spring: Ryōharu (Shinkosha Jan 2007)
- Ryo Shihono: Sukusui Catalog (Task visual Mar 2007)
- Hana no Kō 1 Trio: Sakura Sakura Sakura (Task visual Apr 2007) [Co-starring Mina Kurata and Akari Mochitsuki]
- Real: non BGM (Task visual Aug 2007)
- Amai Seikatsu (Task visual Jan 2008)
- White (Task visual, Apr 2008)
- Bukatsuna Ryo-chan (Task visual, Nov 2008)
- Yume de Aetara (Task visual, Mar 2009)
- Mizu no Naka (Task visual, Jul 2009)
- Kaze no Kiseki (Task visual, Dec 2009)
- Kōkō Sotsugyō Kinen Sakuhin/Tabidachi (Task visual, Mar 2010)
- Hiyashinsu (Task visual, Aug 2010)
- Figure Baby! (Task visual, Jan 2011)
- Kimi gairu dake de (Task visual, Jan 2012)
- **School Mizugi Annual** (Task visual, Apr 2012)
- **kiss me...** (Task visual, Dec 2012)
- **Precious** (Task visual, Aug 2013)
- **Aphrodite** (Task visual, Dec 2014)
- **Spica** (Task visual, Jun 2015)

=== CD ===
- Andel addict (avex) TV anime Lemon Angel Project theme song
- Watashi O Sagashite (avex) LAP Satori Minato Character Song
- LAP Sound Addict (avex) LAP Soundtrack
- Never Give Up (avex) Play Song Single
- Evolution (avex) Play Song Single
- Lemon Angel Addict (avex) Song Collection Album
- be Smile (avex) – TV anime CR New Generation ending theme song
- Sweet Sunday SukaPā 371 ch ending
- My Precious Friends (Index music) "Jikuu Keisatsu Wecker Signa" ending theme song
- Sora (Index music) "Jikuu Keisatsu Wecker Signa" insert song
- natural (Chambers Records) 1st Album (20/07/2008)

=== Goods ===
- Solo Trading Card (Sep 2005 A&S)
- Solo Calendar: 2006 Edition (Nov 2005 FTP)
- Life-size Large-sided Print Poster (Jul 2006 Triax)
- Life-size Cushion (Aug 2006 Triax)
- Solo Calendar: 2006 Edition (Oct 2006 Triax)
- Microman Wecker Signa Series (Aug 2007 Tomy)
- Wecker Signa Trading Card (Sep 2007 Movic)
