= Makoto Takeda =

Japanese actress and junior idol model

- 竹田真恋人
- Born: Makoto Takeda; December 17, 1990 (age 35); Tokyo, Japan
- Occupations: Actress, model
- Years active: 2002-present

Makoto Takeda (竹田真恋人, Takeda Makoto; born December 17, 1990) is a Japanese actress and former junior idol model. She was previously signed to Stardust Promotion, but left in 2009 to work freelance.

== Career ==
Takeda made her first appearance as a model at the age of 11 in the music video of Maya Okamoto's Dear. The same year, she auditioned and won a role in Ojamajo Kids, a stage performance of Ojamajo Doremi, as Onpu Segawa.

== Filmography ==
=== Television ===
Year	Title	Role	Notes
2003	U-15.F Suki ni Sasete!	Herself	Variety show regular
2004-2005	Shibusuta	Herself	Variety show regular
2007-2008	Cutie Honey: The Live	Yuki Kenmochi/Sister Yuki	Lead role

=== Music video ===
Year	Artist	Song	Notes
2002	Maya Okamoto	"Dear..."	

=== Theatre ===
Year	Title	Role	Notes
2002-2003	Ojamajo Kids	Onpu Segawa	Lead role

== Publications ==
=== Photobooks ===
1. True Heart (July 2004, ISBN 978-4778100162)
