= Ayame Misaki =

Japanese actress and gravure model (born 1989)

- 水崎 綾女
- Born: April 26, 1989 (age 37); Kobe, Hyogo Prefecture, Japan
- Occupations: Actress; gravure model
- Years active: 2005–present
- Agent: Horipro
- Spouses: Unknown (m. 2016; div. 2017); Unknown (m. 2024)

Ayame Misaki (水崎 綾女, Misaki Ayame; born April 26, 1989) is a Japanese actress and gravure model who is affiliated with Horipro. She originally debuted in magazines of gravure and variety shows, then later working as an actress. She is well known for portraying Miki in Cutie Honey: The Live and Saori Shibuki in Alice in Borderland.

== Biography ==
Misaki was born on April 26, 1989, in Kobe, Hyogo Prefecture. Her family consists of her mother and father, and she is the fourth among five sisters.

== Career ==
Misaki won the 29th Horipro Tarento Scout Caravan in the Weekly Young Sunday award (best gravure award) and debuted. Her advertising slogan is "Heisei-born F Cup". On January 15, 2005, Misaki debuted in the gravure magazine, Weekly Young Sunday. On October 12, 2005, she served as the first police chief in the Harajuku police station. In 2006, Misaki was elected in Five Star Girl. On March 2, 2006, she became in the entertainer women's futsal team Xanadu loves NHC. In December 2006, in Ninki ko gekidan to Gravure Idol no Collaboration of Otaiba Show-Geki-jō, Misaki debuted in Nirubauna directed by Seiji Nozoe. In October 2007, she appeared in Cutie Honey: The Live as Miki Saotome. In 2012, Misaki appeared in Tokumei Sentai Go-Busters as Escape starting from episode 22.

== Personal life ==
On July 11, 2016, Misaki announced her marriage to a non-celebrity man after dating for a year. A year later the two divorced in October 2017, citing "differences in their lifestyles" as the cause.

On February 9, 2025, It was revealed in Rumiko Koyanagi's blog that Misaki had remarried a year earlier to a non-celebrity man.

== Filmography ==
=== Film ===
Year	Title	Role	Notes	Ref.
2008	Oretachi ni Asu wa Naissu	Aki		
2013	Tokumei Sentai Go-Busters vs. Kaizoku Sentai Gokaiger: The Movie	Escape		
2013	Hanako-san	Takako Koyama		
2014	Zyuden Sentai Kyoryuger vs. Go-Busters: The Great Dinosaur Battle! Farewell Our Eternal Friends	Escape		
2014	Girl's Blood	Miko		
2015	Attack on Titan	Hiana		
2015	Kiri: The Chronicles of a Professional Killer			
2016	Hentai Kamen: Abnormal Crisis			
2017	Radiance	Misako Ozaki		
2018	Futari no Uketorinin			
2019	Born Bone Born	Yūko		
2021	Tomorrow's Dinner Table	Kaori Takeuchi		
2024	City Hunter	Tsukino Seta		
2025	Nagasaki: In the Shadow of the Flash			

=== Television series ===
Year	Title	Role	Notes	Ref.
2006	Kisshō Tennyo	Mari Ono		
2007	Cutie Honey: The Live	Miki Saotome		
2009	Saru Lock		Episode 1	
2010	Gegege's Wife	Tomomi Sunada	Asadora; episodes 146–147	
2011	Suzuki Sensei		Episode 3	
2011	The Reason I Can't Find My Love	Meg	Episodes 2–8	
2012	Deka Kurokawa Suzuki	Yuki Mizushima	Episode 8	
2012	Tokumei Sentai Go-Busters	Escape	Episodes 22–48	
2013	Aji Ichi Monme			
2013	Higanjima	Ryoko		
2015	AIBOU: Tokyo Detective Duo	Minako Jinkawa	Season 13; episode 17	
2020	Alice in Borderland	Saori Shibuki	Season 1; episodes 1–3	
