= Cutie Honey: The Live =

Japanese tokusatsu manga and anime series

- Cutie Honey (Hara) and Seiji Hayami (Yamamoto)
- Genre: Tokusatsu
- Based on: Cutie Honey by Go Nagai
- Developed by: Toshiki Inoue
- Directed by: Makoto Yokoyama
- Opening theme: Cutie Honey
- Ending theme: BUT, metamorphosis; I lost the place; Scarlet Sigh...
- Composer: Takeshi Watanabe
- Country of origin: Japan
- Original language: Japanese
- No. of episodes: 26

Production
- Running time: 25 minutes
- Production company: Honey Production Committee

Original release
- Network: TV Tokyo
- Release: October 2, 2007 – March 25, 2008

Cutie Honey: The Live (キューティーハニー THE LIVE, Kyūtī Hanī Za Raibu) is a Japanese tokusatsu production of the manga and anime series Cutie Honey by Go Nagai. It was directed by Makoto Yokoyama and mostly written by Toshiki Inoue. It first aired on TV Tokyo on October 2, 2007. Honey Kisaragi is portrayed by the gravure idol Mikie Hara. Discotek Media published the show on Blu-ray in 2021.[2]

== Premise ==
Honey Kisaragi is an android posing as a high school student. Her father, a scientist, implants her with a device that allows her to transform into Cutie Honey. He is killed by the evil organization Panther Claw, whose leaders exploit and kill innocent civilians and want to obtain Honey's power. Honey uses this power to fight back.

== Characters ==
=== Honey Kisaragi/Cutie Honey ===
Cutie Honey as seen on volume 6 of the DVDs

Honey Kisaragi (如月 ハニー, Kisaragi Hanī) is an android girl who can transform into Cutie Honey (キューティーハニー, Kyūtī Hanī) by tapping on her heart necklace and saying the words "Honey flash!" (ハニーフラッシュ!, Hanī Furasshu!). Her powers come from the Atmospheric Element Condenser (空中元素固定装置, Kūchū Genso Kotei Sōchi) installed in her body, also known as the "Honey System" (ハニーシステム, Hanī Shisutemu). The Honey System allows the creation of objects out of thin air, allowing Honey to transform her outfit into practically any disguise. The Honey System can also reduce objects to thin air just as easily, which Honey uses as a finishing move to destroy anything she is in contact with. She possesses super intelligence, strength, and healing abilities. Her emblem is a Red heart and in battle, she can summon a rapier called the "Silver Fleuret" (シルバーフルーレ, Shirubā Furūre). She seems to have a crush on Yuji's third personality, Giza. However, her strong crush also inadvertently gives him a fourth personality named Hikaru.

On a few occasions, the energy of her Honey System goes out of control and begins to destroy everything which she touches. When this happens, Honey sleeps for 3 days and then goes into berserk mode. To prevent this, Seiji has a device that will drain away all the excess energy and return her to normal. To date, this has only occurred twice.

After finding out that both Miki and Yuki could transform as well, she tries to unite the three of them against Panther Claw. However, their clashing personalities make this difficult. It was also revealed that she was the one who buried her father, Doctor Kisaragi, one year ago. However, she does not know the cause of his death.

After driving off Hikaru, Honey brings Miki's lifeless body to Mayumi, requesting an operation in order to revive her. Mayumi accepts, but tells Honey that Miki would be depressed if she is to go on with the operation. Regardless, she is prepared. However, Hikaru once again manages to mess up the proceedings, and even steals Honey's power in the process. With Yuki's help, he is driven off one more time. After hearing Yuki's request to kill Honey, she willingly accepts, but on the condition that Yuki takes care of Miki in her stead. With that, Yuki accepts her request, then decapitates Honey on the spot.

Honey's lifeless body is picked up by Hiromi, who forcibly transfers her powers to Yuki. The conversion makes Yuki evil and destructive. After Miki retrieves her, Honey is revived by Mayumi and imbued with Miki's powers. When she comes to, the first person to greet her is Hayami, who doesn't have the heart to tell her the truth about everything. She runs to Professor Kisaragi's mansion to find the truth for herself. It is there that she finally meets Yuki again, this time completely under Hiromi's control. She initially refuses to fight her, but after finding the backup limiter, she Flashes, this time with a blue outfit and Kukri weapon similar to Miki's. After Hiromi is killed by Yuki, Honey manages to ultimately destroy her. After the battle is over, Honey decides to help out Hayami, now known as the Warrior of Love, Cutie Honey. In the epilogue, it is hinted that both Miki and Yuki "live on" inside Honey as Honey demonstrates fighting techniques similar to Miki's headbutt and Yuki's kick.

This version of Cutie Honey is more empty-headed than her previous incarnations, possessing a very poor grasp of social conventions and an almost perpetually upbeat attitude, which has caused animosity amongst her peers in her class. Unlike the original where she was a Catholic schoolgirl, she attends a standard all-girls high school in this version.

Honey is portrayed by Mikie Hara.

=== Seiji Hayami ===
Seiji Hayami (早見 青児, Hayami Seiji) is a young, excitable private detective who helps support Honey. His dream is to write a book on the "demonish (sic) things in modern Japan's shaddy (sic)[underworld]", and to this end he lives in a slum so as to better understand the dark side of society. He met Honey 14 months ago, while he was helping a girl get her "notebook" from a gang and subsequently running away from that gang. Honey was disguised as a fortune teller and transformed to fight the gang members. In the present, Honey is helping him with his detective cases.

He constantly goes after different women. He confesses his love for Saotome Miki in a letter, which she tears up in front of him. He also expresses feelings for Yuki, who rejects him. Although he is rejected by both girls, he continues to court them, especially Yuki.

Some time after the final battle ends, Hayami returns to the Kisaragi residence to gather Doctor Kisaragi's research. His original intention is to safeguard the information from Panther Claw and similar criminal organizations, but after discovering Doctor Kisaragi's notebook and learning the truth about the creation of Honey, Miki, and Yuki, he destroys it. Seiji is portrayed by Shouma Yamamoto.

=== Miki Saotome/Sister Miki ===
Sister Miki as seen on volume 7 of the DVDs

Miki Saotome (早乙女 ミキ, Saotome Miki) is an introverted and anti-social young girl. Like Honey, she has the Honey System installed in her body, changing her into a blue armored form called Sister Miki (シスターミキ, Shisutā Miki). In this form she cannot control her aggression, causing her to develop a fear of herself. She stays away from other people because she is afraid of hurting them against her will. Despite her cold demeanor, she cares about Honey.

Miki was originally a normal schoolgirl in a happy family. Her parents are killed when Doctor Kisaragi uses the Atmospheric Element Condenser to create a giant hand made of stone that stops the car her family was in and ultimately takes her life. She is then reprogrammed as Doctor Kisaragi's daughter. However, when flaws are shown in her Honey system, she is discarded by Dr. Kisaragi. After Miki finds out the truth, she kills Doctor Kisaragi in cold blood before turning herself in to a juvenile institution for young girls.

When Miki stays transformed for too long, her kukri becomes a rusted piece of metal. In this state, she is captured by Yuji and trapped in a room of chains to prevent her from transforming to escape. When Honey comes to save her as bait to get Honey's Honey System, Miki transforms to save her, sacrificing her life in the process. She then reveals that she was the one who killed Professor Kisaragi, their father, because her true family and herself had been killed by him in order to transform her into an android. She dies, impaled from the inside from the chains she had taken into her body during her final Honey Flash.

She is revived again at Honey's request by Mayumi, albeit with a limited lifespan. She then goes on a rescue mission to save Honey and Yuki from Hiromi, only to find Honey's lifeless body at the surgery site. She returns to Mayumi, requesting the same operation Honey did for her, not only to save Honey's life, but for her own sake so that she can live on in Honey who is able to "throw everything into just being alive". Mayumi accepts, saving Honey and transferring Miki's powers and abilities to her at the price of Miki's life.

Like Honey, she transforms with the phrase "Honey Flash!" (ハニーフラッシュ!, Hanī Furasshu!) by pressing her personal emblem, a blue spade. However, her transformations are flawed: she draws any loose metal she is in contact with into her body when she flashes, only to pull them out painfully later. Her weapon is a kukri called the "Boomerang Bleu" (ブーメランブル, Būmeran Buru). Miki's blue motif and stark contrast to Honey's personality draw many parallels between her and Misty Honey, Cutie Honey's rival from Cutie Honey Flash.

Miki is portrayed by Ayame Misaki.

=== Yuki Kenmochi/Sister Yuki ===
Sister Yuki as seen on volume 8 of the DVDs

Yuki Kenmochi (剣持 ユキ, Kenmochi Yuki) is the adopted daughter of the prestigious Kenmochi family. She states that she has only been living with the Kenmochi family for three years. She is very proper in how she speaks and acts, and is extremely naive, although she is very fond of curry.

Yuki was originally a young girl living in a hospital. She was dying of a terminal disease when she was discovered by Doctor Kisaragi, who remade her in a second attempt to recreate his daughter. The experiment was initially a success, but just like with Miki, she was eventually discarded when flaws were shown in her system.

She develops romantic feelings for Honey after they meet for the first time. After this meeting, she begins to show a darker nature, becoming jealous of any of Honey's companions she shows affection for. She becomes increasingly self-centered and greedy, believing that Honey is meant for her alone. When she learns the truth about Dr. Kisaragi, believed to be her real father, and Miki's ability to Flash, her personality changes dramatically, killing anyone who will not give her answers about her past on sight. She is responsible for killing Duke Watari and twice threatens Miki's life.

She also possesses the power of the Honey System, changing into a white armored form called Sister Yuki (シスターユキ, Shisutā Yuki) with the phrase "Honey Flash!" (ハニーフラッシュ!, Hanī Furasshu!). In this form she becomes a cold, merciless warrior using graceful and powerful karate. Her personal emblem is a white diamond. She can summon a chakram called the "Platinum Chakram" (プラチナチャクラム, Purachina Chakuramu) as her weapon. Like Miki, her Honey System is flawed. This flaw began with materializing random toys outside of her body. The malfunction progresses later on into absorbing objects into her body and forced out later in a similar fashion to Miki's flaw. Upon being told by Yuji that Honey is not a human but simply an android, she becomes convinced that Dr. Kisaragi created Honey to be "spare parts" for her, so that she can repair her flawed Honey System.

Since then, she has forced Honey to reveal the truth about being an android in front of her classmates, and started a campaign in order to keep Honey alone; this way, Yuki would be Honey's only friend, and ensures that she would be around when she will need the spare parts. She has threatened Seiji many times. After beating up Yuji with Honey's help, she then decapitates a willing Honey in order to maintain her own life, but not before promising Honey to "take care" of Miki in her stead. However, before any of that could happen her Atmospheric Element Condenser fails. Yuji returns to see both Yuki's and Honey's lifeless bodies. Their bodies were eventually taken by Hiromi and her husband whose plans were to take Honey's powers and transfer them over to Yuki's body. This process turns her evil with a will to destroy anything in her path. She would later have a backup limiter placed on her neck when the initial limiter implanted within her fails, placing her fully under Hiromi's control. In the battle with Honey the backup limiter is destroyed. However, still unable to gain control of herself, she kills Hiromi and continues to fight Honey who ultimately destroys her. After her body is destroyed, Yuki comes to Hayami as a spirit with a final request for him to take care of Honey.

Yuki is portrayed by Makoto Takeda.

=== Natsuko Aki ===
Natsuko Aki (秋 夏子, Aki Natsuko) is Honey's best friend and room-mate. When Honey flashes to save one of her classmates, she becomes aware that Honey is an android. She, along with her other classmates, tries to avoid her after learning this. Natsuko then develops a fever, and after realizing that Honey has taken care of her, she rekindles her friendship.

Natsuko seems a bit nerdy, and she has glasses that she constantly adjusts. She often expresses concern about her looks, the size of her breasts being an especial worry for her.

Natsuko is portrayed by Megumi Komatsu.

=== Gen-san ===
Gen-san (源さん, Gen san) is a homeless man who often hangs out with Hayami. He is very well connected amongst Japan's homeless, and is a great source of information on the underworld. He also has the uncanny ability to find (and cook) edible things in the most unlikely of places.

Gen-san is portrayed by Kenichi Nagira.

=== Doctor Kōshirō Kisaragi ===
Doctor Kōshirō Kisaragi (如月こうしろう博士, Kisaragi Kōshirō Hakase) is the professor behind the creation of Cutie Honey, as well as her two predecessors, Miki and Yuki. After his daughter died in an accident involving an early model of the Atmospheric Element Condenser, he was motivated to recreate her. To this end, he targeted two young girls with the same birth date as his daughter and recreated them as androids, only to discard them when flaws were shown in their programming. After both experiments failed, he decided to recreate his daughter from scratch (Honey), however, before she was activated, he was ultimately killed by Miki.

Doctor Kisaragi is portrayed by Go Nagai, the creator of the Cutie Honey series.

== Panther Claw ==
Panther Claw (パンサークロー, Pansā Kurō) is an underworld organization dedicated to profit at any cost, saying at one point that making money is "the same as breathing" to them. They serve as the main antagonists of the series, and use advanced cyborgs (identifiable by their black hoods) as their henchmen. It is split into four divisions, each covering a different business and run by a different executive. In the epilogue, a new Panther Claw is shown, wearing silver masks, under the command of a female monster.

=== Yuji Nakajo ===
Yuji Nakajo (中条 有次, Nakajō Yūji) is a young genius with an IQ of over 200 and multiple personality disorder. His two main personalities are that of a cold, calculating adult and an excitable, cruel child named Hikomaro (ヒコマロ). In these two forms, he can produce razor-sharp feathers from his arms and hands which he can fire at will.

He also possesses a third, demonic personality named Giza (ギザ) that he cannot control. When this personality takes control, he becomes overly aggressive, more tapped into his emotions, and is able to produce bat wings from his arms with fearsome claws as hands. He later manifests a fourth personality named Hikaru (ヒカル), a female personality who does not like to fight, preferring to manipulate others into doing what she wants instead. This personality was brought about when Yuji was overwhelmed by Honey's affection for him, and a small portion of Honey's power manifested itself as a mole on Yuji's face.

In his Hikaru personality, he has become obsessed with obtaining the Honey System in order to make himself as "beautiful" as Honey. He has experimented at the cost of his henchmen's lives. He has been so far successful in creating a flawed Honey System similar to Yuki and Miki's, but wishes to perfect it by using Honey's body. After Honey was decapitated, Yuki lost consciousness after her forehead was penetrated by metals. Taking advantage of the opportunity, Yuji managed to obtain the Honey System by taking Honey and Yuki hostage. His plan to become complete like honey, however, was foiled by Hiromi, who uses the Honey System to revive and turn Yuki into a destructive weapon. Yuji was ultimately defeated when Yuki used "Honey Flash" and ran her chakram through his body. From the surface of a pond, Yuji sees the reflection of his four personalities, Hikomaro, Nakajou, Giza, and Hikaru, respectively. After seeing his image as Hikaru, he commented, "Beautiful," before dropping his head onto the water.

He runs an illegal gambling operation, creating and executing spectacular bets for the wealthy elite to place their money on. In the first episode, for example, he breaks three men out of prison, gives them advanced weaponry and takes bets on who will last the longest. However, he also rigs the results of these gambles by using his henchmen to interfere.

Yuji is portrayed by Kohei Murakami.

=== Duke Watari ===
Duke Seiya Anthony Watari IV (デューク清也アンソニー渡4世, Dyūku Seiya Ansonī Watari Yonsei) is a bilingual gentleman who switches between English and Japanese very frequently. His public face is that of the president of an IT company. Though he is composed most of the time, he possesses an extremely short temper and is prone to yelling "Shit!" when something bad–no matter how minor–happens to him. He can produce blades from his feet and possesses incredible fighting abilities. He has a friendly rivalry with Yuji. He is on his fourth- and fifth-foot blades, the previous ones being pulled out by Sister Yuki. However, after he was beaten by both Honey and Miki, he runs into a confused Yuki, who kills him in a brutal fashion with her chakram. His remains were subsequently picked up by Yuji, who remakes him into a mindless cyborg. Once Yuki becomes complete and once again fights him in his mindless state, she burns a part of his face off, and just when it seems like he's been shut down for good, gets back up with his usual, "SHIT!" and kicked Yuji with his foot blade. Before he can fight Yuki, however, his cybernetic body fails him, and he falls to the floor, without ending his last sentence, "You little bit...."

His role in Panther Claw is to create the cybernetic "human weapons" that they use as henchmen and in auctions to sell for profit. He accomplishes this using a medical care group as a front, using hospitals to change innocent patients into brainwashed bio-mechanical weapons.

Watari is portrayed by Mark Musashi.

=== Mayumi Karasugawa ===
Mayumi Karasugawa (烏川 真由美, Karasugawa Mayumi) is a cruel sadist who works as a teacher at Hamaguri Gakuen, an elite private school. She is a lesbian who makes vicious advances on her students and is attracted to Honey and Miki on first sight. She is an expert in Kinbaku, a style of bondage originating in Japan, and uses it to tie up men who she believes have been "bad". She also has the ability to swallow and regurgitate whole eggs at will. Because of her strong interest in Miki, she tends to act as an informant at times. It was also through Miki's ex-boyfriend that Mayumi discovers Miki's dark secret as the murderer of Doctor Kisaragi, which only fuels her interest in Miki even more as she tells Miki that she is the only one who would love and accept her darkness.

It was later revealed that Mayumi had loved Miki more than any other woman, and would even kill her own subordinates to make sure she was safe. She was devastated when Honey brought a lifeless Miki to her, and was more than willing to start an operation to transfer Honey's life energy over to Miki at Honey's request. She is later scouted by Miki for the same reasons, to which she at first refuses, but once she saw that Miki was willing to give herself to her for Honey, she called her a "foolish woman" and proceeded to doing the operation. During the operation, Miki grabs her hand, her final words being, "Mayumi Karasugawa, Thank you", and with those words, she felt both a pain in her heart and from the wound she had previously received by being impaled by Miki's kukri in their last battle. She finishes the operation and takes Miki's lifeless body down a river in a rowboat. She has one final sentimental moment with Miki and dies alongside her body, laying in a rowboat they both were eventually submerged into the water sometime afterwards. Mayumi's mask was later shown floating above the water's surface at the end of the scene.

In combat, she uses tekagi-shuko. By putting on a special half-mask, she can transform into her own armored form resembling a harlequin. In this form she can extend her hair to bind her opponents.

She uses Hamaguri Gakuen to scout out and induct new members of Panther Claw.

Mayumi is portrayed by Erika.

=== Hiromi Tanaka ===
On the surface, Hiromi Tanaka (田中 弘美, Tanaka Hiromi) is a mild-mannered housewife who runs a fish shop in a quiet shopping district. The truth is that she is a Panther Claw executive with a pathological obsession with making money. She is secretly in control of the district where her shop is, and establishes ridiculous taxes, laws and fines in order to collect money. Her husband also helps in her schemes and is a proficient martial artist, although from time to time, his back tends to give out. The two are often seen driving a truck in their many attempts to capture Honey.

Hiromi was perhaps the most successful of the four Panther Claw leaders in obtaining the Honey System had she not lost control of Yuki. When Honey destroys the backup limiter, Hiromi assumes that Yuki was broken, but later suffered the same fate as Yuji as the liberated Yuki once again used "Honey Flash" and penetrated her with the chakram. In death, Hiromi asks her husband and son to "take care of the rest" before dissolving into molecules, leaving behind a starfish and various fishes.

She uses various frozen sea creatures as her weapons, from exploding starfish she throws like shurikens to a large fish which she wields like a sword. Naturally, they lose their effectiveness once they have thawed. Hiromi's most powerful weapon is a rocket launcher installed within her stomach.

Hiromi is portrayed by Eri Fuse.

=== Gorgon Yamada ===
Gorgon Yamada (ゴーゴン山田, Gorgon Yamada) is the new Panther Claw leader that Honey faces in the epilogue. She is assisted by henchmen with silver masks.

== Episodes ==
1. Honey Flash! (ハニーフラッシュ！, Hanī Furasshu!)
2. Hostess Club Blitz! (キャバクラ大作戦！, Kyabakura Daisakusen!)
3. Nurse and Explore! (ナースで探れ！, Nāsu de Sagure!)
4. Fear Auction! (恐怖のオークション！, Kyōfu no Ōkushon!)
5. Second Girl! (第二の少女！, Dai Ni no Shōjo!)
6. Maid Please! (メイドでどうぞ！, Meido de Dōzo!)
7. Beware of the Cellphone! (ケータイにご用心！, Kētai ni Goyōjin!)
8. Dangerous Lesson! (危険なレッスン！, Kiken na Ressun!)
9. The Princess Kidnapping Incident! (お嬢さま誘拐事件！, Ojōsama Yūkai Jiken!)
10. Trap of the Triple Date! (トリプルデートの罠！, Toripuru Dēto no Wana!)
11. The Corrupt Old Lady! (悪徳のおばさん！, Akutoku no Obasan!)
12. Desire for Harmony! (欲望のハーモニー！, Yokubō no Hāmonī!)
13. Mixer to Me! (合コンしちゃうぞ！, Gōkon Shichau zo!)
14. A Toast to Memory! (乾杯メモリー！, Kanpai Memorī!)
15. Reckless Honey! (暴走ハニー！, Bōsō Hanī!)
16. Forbidden Love! (禁じられた恋！, Kinjirareta Koi!)
17. The Devil's Ensemble! (悪魔のアンサンブル！, Akuma no Ansanburu!)
18. Return Papa! (パパをかえして！, Papa o Kaeshite!)
19. Android, Get Out! (アンドロイドは出て行け！, Andoroido wa Deteike!)
20. The Value of Existence! (存在の価値！, Sonzai no Kachi!)
21. The Secret of Professor Kisaragi! (如月博士の秘密！, Kisaragi-hakase no Himitsu!)
22. The Last Wish! (最後のお願い！, Saigo no Onegai!)
23. The Gift from Father! (お父様からの贈り物！, Otōsama kara no Okurimono!)
24. Requiem of Fury! (激情のレクイエム！, Gekijō no Rekuiemu!)
25. Final episode: Warriors of Love! (愛の戦士たち！, Saishūwa: Ai no Senshi-tachi!)
26. Special episode: Dr. Kisaragi's Notebook! (如月博士の手帖！, Supesharu episōdo: Kisaragi-hakase no Techō!)
  - This episode was a DVD exclusive

== Cast ==
- Honey Kisaragi (如月 ハニー, Kisaragi Hanī): Mikie Hara (原 幹恵, Hara Mikie)
- Seiji Hayami (早見 青児, Hayami Seiji): Shouma Yamamoto (山本 匠馬, Yamamoto Shōma)
- Miki Saotome (早乙女 ミキ, Saotome Miki): Ayame Misaki (水崎 綾女, Misaki Ayame)
- Yuki Kenmochi (剣持 ユキ, Kenmochi Yuki): Makoto Takeda (竹田 真恋人, Takeda Makoto)
- Natsuko Aki (秋 夏子, Aki Natsuko): Megumi Komatsu (小松 愛, Komatsu Megumi)
- Gen-san (源さん, Gen san): Kenichi Nagira (なぎら 健壱, Nagira Ken'ichi)
- Yuji Nakajo (中条 有次, Nakajō Yūji): Kohei Murakami (村上 幸平, Murakami Kōhei)
- Duke Watari (デューク渡, Dūku Watari): Mark Musashi (マーク武蔵, Māku Musashi)
- Mayumi Karasugawa (烏川 真由美, Karasugawa Mayumi): Erika (Erika Oda) (エリカ（小田エリカ）, Erika (Oda Erika))
- Hiromi Tanaka (田中 弘美, Tanaka Hiromi): Eri Fuse (ふせ えり, Fuse Eri)
- Sakunosuke Tanaka (田中 作之助): Tsutomu Kitagawa (喜多川 務, Kitagawa Tsutomu)
- Doctor Kōshirō Kisaragi (如月こうしろう博士, Kisaragi Kōshirō Hakase): Go Nagai (永井 豪, Nagai Gō)

== Songs ==
Opening theme

- "Cutie Honey" (キューティーハニー, Kyūtī Hanī)
  - Lyrics: Claude Q (クロード・Q, Kurōdo Kyū)
  - Composition: Takeo Watanabe (渡辺 岳夫, Watanabe Takeo)
  - Arrangement: Tsuyoshi Watanabe (渡辺 剛, Watanabe Tsuyoshi)
  - Artist: Wild 3-Nin Musume (ワイルド三人娘, Wairudo Sannin Musume)
  - Episodes: 1-24

Used as the ending theme for episode 25
Ending themes

- "BUT,metamorphosis"
  - Lyrics: Aki Hata (畑 亜貴, Hata Aki)
  - Composition & Arrangement: Katsuhiko Kurosu (黒須 克彦, Kurosu Katsuhiko)
  - Artist: Minami Kuribayashi (栗林 みな実, Kuribayashi Minami)
  - Episodes: 1-4, 6-7, 9, 11, 13-16, 18, 20, 22

Cutie Honey's ending theme

- "I lost the place"
  - Lyrics: Aki Hata (畑 亜貴, Hata Aki)
  - Composition & Arrangement: Katsuhiko Kurosu (黒須 克彦, Kurosu Katsuhiko)
  - Artist: Aki Misato (美郷 あき, Misato Aki)
  - Episodes: 5, 8, 12, 17, 21, 24

Sister Miki's ending theme

- "Toiki Scarlet..." (吐息Scarlet..., Toiki Sukāretto...; "Scarlet Sigh...")
  - Lyrics: Saori Kodama (こだま さおり, Kodama Saori)
  - Composition & Arrangement: Kaoru Okubo (大久保 薫, Ōkubo Kaoru)
  - Artist: Aira Yuhki (結城 アイラ, Yūki Aira)
  - Episodes: 7, 10, 19, 23

Sister Yuki's ending theme

Cutie Honey: The Live Vocal Album: Metamorphoses was an album released featuring songs performed by various Lantis recording artists for the series, including remixes of the opening theme by Wild 3-Nin Musume, the second and third ending themes, "Out Sider" (アウトサイダー, Autosaidā) by Granrodeo (as well as a remix), "Flash the Night" by Masaaki Endoh, a cover of Amii Ozaki's "Serenade" (蒼夜曲（セレナーデ）, Serenāde) by Masami Okui, "Follow you" (Follow you ～君とともに～, Follow you ~Kimi to Tomo ni~) by Hironobu Kageyama, and "the Last Land" by Childe~.
