= Mark Musashi =

Japanese actor (born 1977)

Masaru Edward Fulenwider-Musashi (born April 26, 1977 in Rikuzentakata, Iwate, Japan), known professionally as Mark Musashi (マーク武蔵, Māku Musashi), is a Wushu martial artist and a stuntman/actor or Gaijin tarento.

== Biography ==
Raised in Buckfield, Maine to a Japanese mother and a White American father. His mother worked as an accountant while his father is a school teacher. He has an older sister, Margaret. He attended Dartmouth College (Class of 1999), majoring in East Asian Languages and Literatures and minoring in Drama.

He took the fall term of his senior year there to go to China to study Northern Shaolin Kung Fu. After college, he moved to Japan, where, after getting his start doing a women's underwear commercial, he was soon recruited by AAC Stunts.

Since then, he has worked on various tokusatsu series as a stunt/suit actor and even as a regular. Best known for his role as the mysterious murderer named Piece in the live-action drama Sh15uya, Musashi was also seen in Cutie Honey: The Live as Duke Seiya Anthony Watari IV, a bilingual gentleman in the service of the organization Panther Claw. He has participated in several Wushu competition championships and he has done motion capture for several video games. In 2008, he moved to Los Angeles to pursue American acting and stunt opportunities.

Since then, he's largely worked as a stunt performer in films, television shows and video games, with scattered speaking parts. In 2022, he was cast as Hansel, a High Table assassin, in The Continental: From the World of John Wick, a miniseries that premiered on Peacock in 2023.

== Video game credits ==
- Uncharted 4: A Thief's End (2017), Sony Computer Entertainment
- Titanfall 2 (2016), Respawn Entertainment (Motion Capture)
- The Last of Us (2013), Naughty Dog (stunt performer)
- Lost Planet 2 (2009), Capcom
- Bayonetta (2010), Sega
- God Hand (2006), Capcom
- Metal Gear Solid 3: Snake Eater (2004), Konami - Yevgeny Borisvitch Volgin (motion actor)
- Metal Gear Solid: The Twin Snakes (2004), Konami - Liquid Snake (motion actor)
- Resident Evil Outbreak (2004), Capcom
- Firefighter F.D.18 (2004), Konami
- Arc the Lad: Twilight of the Spirits (2003), Sony Computer Entertainment Incorporated
- Dino Crisis 3 (2003), Capcom
- 7 Days to Die (2013), The Fun Pimps

== Movies ==
- Feral (Action Horror 2018)(American)
- Welcome Back Satan (Comedy 2010) (American)
- Motion actor in Avatar (3-D science fiction film 2009) (American)
- Motion actor in Night at the Museum: Battle of the Smithsonian (live-action film 2009) (American)
- Stunt coordinator in Jonas Brothers: The 3D Concert Experience (American)
- Wu in Yo-Yo Girl Cop (live-action film 2006) (Japanese)
- Kamen Rider 2 (suit actor) in Kamen Rider the First (live-action film 2005) (Japanese)
- LAPD in Devilman (live-action film 2004) (Japanese)
- MP in Shibuya Monogartari (live-action film 2004) (Japanese)
- Panter Claw in Cutie Honey (live-action film 2004) (Japanese)
- Stunt work in Godzilla, Mothra, and King Ghidorah: Giant Monsters All-Out Attack (live-action film 2001) (Japanese)

== Television ==
- Hansel in The Continental: From the World of John Wick (live-action TV, 2023) (American)
- Stunt work in Iron Fist (TV series 2017) (American)
- Stunt work in Wizards of Waverly Place season3 #9 (TV series 2010) (American)
- Stunt work in Dollhouse season2 #9 (TV series 2009) (American)
- Stunt work in Kamen Rider: Dragon Knight (live-action TV 2009) (American)
- Mackiyo Taylor in CSI: NY season5 #8 (TV series 2008) (American)
- Stunt work in iCarly: iGo to Japan (TV series 2008) (American)
- Duke Watari in Cutie Honey: The Live (live-action TV 2007-2008) (Japanese)
- Kodama, DAN (suit actor) in Garo Special: Byakuya no Maju (live-action film 2006) (Japanese)
- Kodama, ZERO (suit actor) in GARO (live-action TV 2005-2006) (Japanese)
- Piece in Sh15uya (live-action TV 2005) (Japanese)
