= Jikuu Keisatsu Wecker SIGHT =

Jikuu Keisatsu Wecker SIGHT (時空警察ヴェッカーサイト, Jikū Keisatsu Vekkā Saito; Chrono Police Wecker SIGHT) is a theatrical production from Kazuya Hatazawa's Jikuu Keisatsu Wecker series (serving as a sequel to Jikuu Keisatsu Wecker Signa and Jikuu Keisatsu Hyperion), planned for limited theatrical release on February 25, 26, and 27, 2011. "SIGHT" stands for "Space-time Inspection Group Hyperion Tactics". Honoka Ayukawa, Showtaro Morikubo, and Sanshiro Wada all return to perform in the production, following their performances in the Wecker Signa television series and the Hyperion film. Wecker SIGHT serves as the tenth anniversary production for the Wecker series.
