= Jikuu Keisatsu Wecker Signa =

- Created by: Kazuya Hatazawa, LayUp
- Starring: Ai Hazuki, Takaou Ayatsuki, Ryo Shihono, Honoka Ayukawa, Miu Nakamura, Sanshiro Wada, Hiroshi Watari, Showtaro Morikubo
- Country of origin: Japan
- No. of episodes: 12

Original release
- Release: 6 July – 21 September 2007

Related
- Jikuu Keisatsu Wecker D-02; Jikuu Keisatsu Hyperion

Jikuu Keisatsu Wecker Signa (時空警察ヴェッカーシグナ, Jikū Keisatsu Vekkā Shiguna; Chrono Police Wecker Signa) is a Japanese tokusatsu series that aired on Tokyo MX from July 6 to September 21, 2007. This third entry in the Jikuu Keisatsu Wecker series featured veteran suit actor Sanshiro Wada as Chrono Investigator Orion and veteran tokusatsu actors Hiroshi Watari of Uchuu Keiji Sharivan as Chrono Investigator Exvarn and Ryu Manatsu of Ultraman Leo as Sumeragi Shishi, and Showtaro Morikubo as Onigumo.

== Theme songs ==
Opening theme

- "RING"
  - Lyrics: Masami Okui
  - Composition & Arrangement: Monta
  - Artist: Masami Okui

Ending theme

- "MY PRECIOUS FRIENDS"
  - Lyrics: Natsuko Kondo
  - Composition: Yoshiko Kawamoto
  - Arrangement: Mikio Hirama
  - Artist: Signally's (Ai Hazuki, Takaou Ayatsuki, Ryo Shihono, Honoka Ayukawa)

Insert songs

- "Kimi ga Iru Kara" (キミがいるから; "Because of You") sung by Ai Hazuki for Saria Kasuga
- "FAITH" sung by Takaou Ayatsuki for Rurika Natsuzawa
- "Sora" (空; "Sky") sung by Ryo Shihono for Reina Fuyuki
- "Marshmallow Heart (マシュマロ☆ハート, Mashumaro Hāto) sung by Honoka Ayukawa for Emiri Akiba
- "sign" sung by Showtaro Morikubo for Yusei Oda
- "Who am I...?" sung by Showtaro Morikubo and Sanshiro Wada for Yusei Oda and Koshiro Orio
