= Jikuu Keisatsu Wecker D-02 =

- Created by: Kazuya Hatazawa, LayUp
- Starring: Yui Ichikawa, Manami Ono, Yuuko Nishimura, Sayaka Morimoto, Yuko Ogura, Chikako Sakuragi, Kohei Murakami
- Country of origin: Japan
- No. of episodes: 12

Original release
- Release: 10 January – 28 March 2002

Related
- Jikuu Keisatsu Wecker; Jikuu Keisatsu Wecker Signa

Jikuu Keisatsu Wecker D-02 (時空警察ヴェッカーD-02, Jikū Keisatsu Vekkā Dī Ō Tsū; Chrono Police Wecker D-02) is a Japanese tokusatsu series that aired on TV Asahi from January 10 to March 28, 2002. The series featured Kohei Murakami as Chrono Investigator Kent Kiba, who would later star in Kamen Rider 555 as Masato Kusaka/Kamen Rider Kaixa.

== Theme song ==
- "Hana" (花; "Flower")
  - Lyrics: Tetsuhiko Suzuki
  - Composition: expo
  - Arrangement: Naoki Yamada, Uni Inoue
  - Artist: Mariko Kōda
