= Ai Hazuki =

Japanese actress and junior idol

Ai Hazuki (葉月 あい, Hazuki Ai, born September 22, 1995) is a Japanese actress and junior idol from Tokyo. She is known for her roles in the television series Jikuu Keisatsu Wecker Signa and the films OneChanbara and Jikuu Keisatsu Hyperion.
