= Radiance (2017 film) =

2017 film

- Film poster
- Directed by: Naomi Kawase
- Written by: Naomi Kawase
- Produced by: Naoya Kinoshita; Masa Sawada; Yumiko Takebe
- Starring: Masatoshi Nagase; Ayame Misaki
- Edited by: Tina Baz
- Music by: Ibrahim Maalouf
- Release dates: 23 May 2017 (Cannes); 27 May 2017 (Japan)
- Running time: 101 minutes
- Country: Japan
- Language: Japanese

Radiance (光, Hikari) is a 2017 Japanese romance drama film directed by Naomi Kawase. It was selected to compete for the Palme d'Or in the main competition section at the 2017 Cannes Film Festival. At Cannes it won the Prize of the Ecumenical Jury.

== Plot ==
Misako (Ayame Misaki) creates movie audio descriptions. Her scripts consist of intensive descriptions of the settings on the screen in an attempt to make them as accessible as possible to blind audiences. With her supervisors, she and her company test a script (for a film we are later told is deeply moving) on a focus group of 10 blind people. At one of the pre-premiere screenings, she meets Masaya (Masatoshi Nagase), a renowned photographer who is without the majority of his sight, which does not allow him to practice his craft outside of a handful of images with which he is aware of what he will capture (i.e., the setting sun, Misako herself). Masaya's strong character makes him the only one to firmly criticize her scripts. He helps Masako see the coldness of her careful descriptions and spurs others to share their critiques. Despite the differences that arise between them, and Misako's own lashing out at Masaya at one of these focus groups when he expresses further disdain at her newly updated script, both manage to create a strong relationship that allows them to explore a world previously invisible to their eyes. Both appear at the grand premiere showing of the film with Misako's script, however, in the wake of their argument, Misako's colleague has finished the script, and it is his voice we hear in the overlay for the film. Many in the audience are moved to tears by the film's audio description. In the last scene of the film, Masaya struggles to climb a small dune. At the top, he stops to face the setting sun.

== Cast ==
- Masatoshi Nagase as Masaya Nakamori
- Ayame Misaki as Misako Ozaki
- Noémie Nakai
- Chihiro Ohtsuka
- Kazuko Shirakawa
- Tatsuya Fuji as Kitabayashi

== Reception ==
The film received a 63% approval rating on Rotten Tomatoes, based on 30 reviews with an average rating of 6.5/10. It also holds a weighted average rating of 52 out of 100 on Metacritic, based on 5 critics, indicating "mixed or average reviews".

Clarence Tsui of The Hollywood Reporter said that "Radiance remains mired in underwritten relationships that end up less emotionally engaging than they appear". Guy Lodge of Variety magazine called the film "pretty" and "sincere".
