= Hiroshi Watari =

Japanese singer and actor (born 1963)

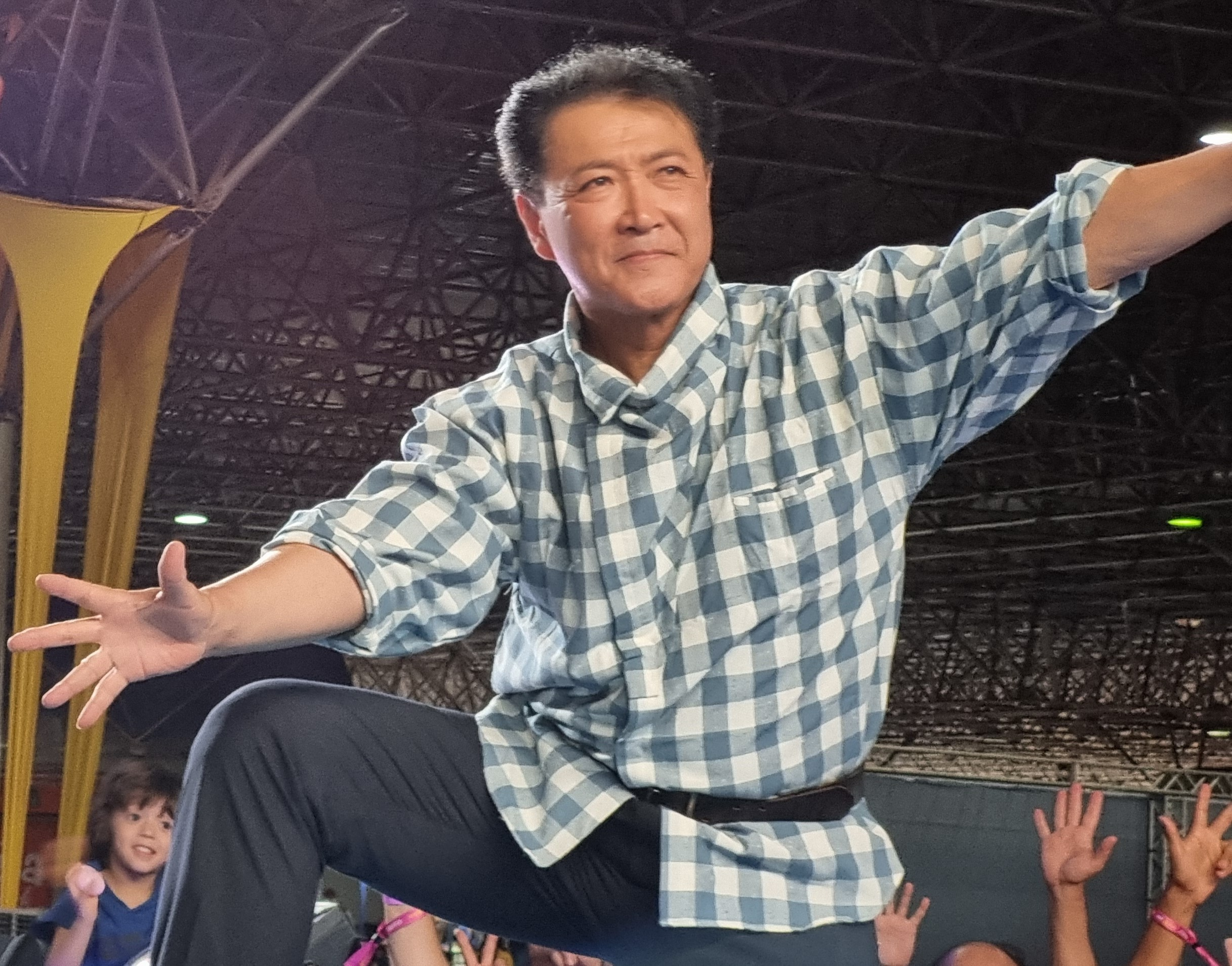
- Watari in 2024
- Born: Hiroshi Watanabe; March 20, 1963 (age 63); Niigata Prefecture
- Occupations: actor, stuntman
- Years active: 1981–present
- Known for: Sharivan, Spielvan and Boormerman in Jaspion
- Spouse: Emi Shinohara (died 2024)
- Children: 1

Hiroshi Watari (渡 洋史, Watari Hiroshi; born March 20, 1963, in Niigata Prefecture) is a Japanese singer, voice actor, and actor. His birth name is Hiroshi Watanabe. His wife was the late voice actress Emi Shinohara, best known as Sailor Jupiter from Sailor Moon. In the past, Watari was signed to 81 Produce, Stunt Japan (スタントジャパン), and Ayers Rock; he is currently signed with Rough. He is best known for his roles of Den Iga in the 1983 Metal Heroes Series Space Sheriff Sharivan and Yousuke Jou in Jikuu Senshi Spielban, making him the only actor to play two different Heroes in two Metal Hero Series.

== Early life ==
Watari graduated from Niigata Prefectural Niigata Koyo High School (新潟県立新潟向陽高等学校). He was inspired by Shin'ichi Chiba 千葉 真一 (Chiba Shin'ichi) in Key Hunter. He joined JAC (Japan Action Club), now Japan Action Enterprise (ジャパンアクションエンタープライズ), in March 1981. At first, he used Hiroshi Watanabe as his stage name, gaining experience by taking minor roles.

In 1983, Watari was selected to play the protagonist Den Iga in Space Sheriff Sharivan and took on Hiroshi Watari as his stage name. In 1986, he played the title role in Jikuu Senshi Spielban.

In 1988, he quit JAC and moved to acting on the stage. In 1990, he played Shinkansen Hashimoto in Starlight Express. In 1992, he portrayed G1 in Miss Saigon.

Watari is also a voice actor.

In 2014, Watari played the role of Den Iga in Space Sheriff NEXT GENERATION.

In 2015, he started his own talk show on Niconico Channel, Choujigendenshiito, Mahoroba (超次元電視いと、まほろば). He co-starred with Yumiko Furuya (降矢由美子, Furuya Yumiko); the regulars from Sharivan also worked with him on the show.

== Filmography ==
=== Film ===
- Zebraman (2004)

=== Television ===
Year	Title	Role	Network	Other notes
1983	Uchuu Keiji Gavan	Den Iga/Sharivan	TV Asahi	Episodes 42-44
1983 - 1984	Uchuu Keiji Sharivan	Den Iga/Sharivan	TV Asahi	
1985	Uchuu Keiji Shaider	Den Iga/Sharivan	TV Asahi	Episode 49
1985 - 1986	Kyojuu Tokusou Juspion	Boomerang	TV Asahi	
1986 - 1987	Jikuu Senshi Spielban	Yousuke Jou/Spielban	TV Asahi	
1987	Choujinki Metalder	Tetsuya	TV Asahi	Episodes 25 & 26
1991	Super Rescue Solbrain		TV Asahi	Episodes 28 & 29
1992	Tokusou Exceedraft	Nobuo Sawamura	TV Asahi	Episodes 30-32
2006	Gougou Sentai Boukenger	Takaoka Karato	TV Asahi	Episodes 19, 20 & 40
2007	Jikuu Keisatsu Wecker Signa	Varn		

=== Video ===
Year	Title	Role	Other notes
2001	Jikuu Keisatsu Wecker	Varn	

=== Anime ===
- Kaikan Phrase
- Daa! Daa! Daa!
- DNAngel - Adonis
- Detective Conan - Koji Misawa

=== Video Game ===
- Space Sheriff Spirits - Den Iga/Sharivan

=== Music video ===
- Ricardo Cruz - "On The Rocks"
