= Kōhei Murakami =

Japanese actor

Kohei Murakami
- 村上 幸平
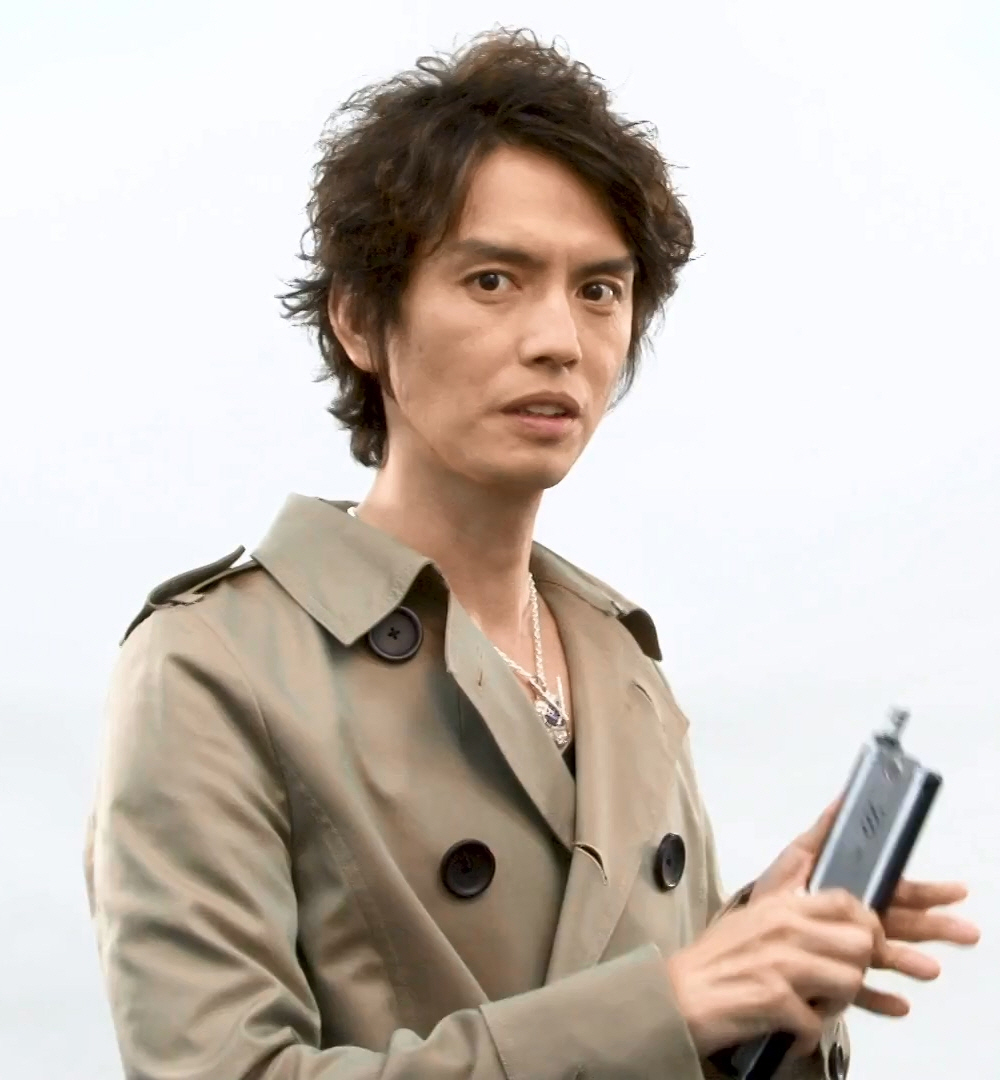
- Murakami as Masato Kusaka
- Born: June 1, 1976 (age 50); Tokyo, Japan
- Occupation: Actor
- Years active: 1995–present
- Height: 181 cm (5 ft 11 in)

Kohei Murakami (村上 幸平, Murakami Kōhei; born June 1, 1976) is a Japanese actor from Tokyo. He graduated from Keio University's business school. He is known for his portrayal of Masato Kusaka/Kamen Rider Kaixa in Kamen Rider 555 and as Yuji Nakajo/Hikomaro/Giza/Hikaru in Cutie Honey: The Live. He also had a regular role as Kent Kiba/Dimensional Investigator Kent in Jikuu Keisatsu Wecker D-02. He also has a role as SpaMurasaki on Nippon Television's parodic Bihada Sentai Sparanger which looks at various onsen throughout Japan.

== Filmography ==
=== Television ===
Year	Title	Role	Notes
1998	GTO: Great Teacher Onizuka		
2001	Sitto no nioi	Keisuke Sawaguchi	
2003-2004	Kamen Rider 555	Masato Kusaka/Kamen Rider Kaixa	
2006	Kamen Rider Kabuto	IT President Uemura	Episode 3
2006	Ultraman Mebius	Hiroshi Isana	Episode 38
2006	Anna san no omame	Reiji	Episode 8
2007-2008	Cutie Honey: The Live	Yuji Nakajo/Hikomaro/Giza/Hikaru	
2008	RH Plus	Mr. Nogami	
2009	Kamen Rider Decade	Masato Kusaka/Kamen Rider Kaixa (voice)	
2009	The Lovers at the Call Center	Shinichi Koyama	Episode 7
2011	Garo: Makai Senki	"Kid"/Genojika Horror	Episode 4
2011	Ore no Sora: Keiji-hen	Hideki Matsumoto	Episode 3
2016	Good Partner: The Invincible Lawyer		Episode 4
2016-2017	Doubutsu Sentai Zyuohger	Bud/Zyuoh Bird	
2018	Kamen Rider Zi-O	Masato Kusaka/Kamen Rider Kaixa	Episode 5-6
2023	Avataro Sentai Donbrothers	Sonoya	Episode 49-50

=== Anime ===
Year	Title	Role	Notes
2018	Sword Gai The Animation	Issei Ariga	

=== Film ===
Year	Title	Role	Notes
2003	Kamen Rider 555: Paradise Lost	Masato Kusaka/Kamen Rider Kaixa	
2005	Baby Mail	Masato Saito	
2007	Life	Akinobu Nitta	
2009	Kamen Rider G	Medical Experiment	
2014	Heisei Riders vs. Shōwa Riders: Kamen Rider Taisen feat. Super Sentai	Masato Kusaka/Kamen Rider Kaixa	
2017	Doubutsu Sentai Zyuohger vs. Ninninger the Movie: Super Sentai's Message from the Future	Bud	
2017	Doubutsu Sentai Zyuohger Returns: Give Me Your Life! Earth Champion Tournament	Bud/Zyuoh Bird	
2018	N.Y. Maxman	Takeshi Jogashima	
2020	Kamen Rider Zi-O Next Time: Geiz, Majesty	Masato Kusaka/Kamen Rider Kaixa	
2024	Kamen Rider 555 20th: Paradise Regained	Masato Kusaka/Kamen Rider Kaixa/Kamen Rider Next Kaixa	

=== Drama ===
Year	Title	Role	Notes
2014	BlazBlue: Continuum Shift	Hazama, Yūki Terumi / Takehaya Susano'o	

=== Video games ===
Year	Title	Role	Notes
2016	Kamen Rider Battride War Genesis	Kamen Rider Kaixa	
