= Mikie Hara =

Japanese gravure idol and actress (born 1987)

- 原 幹恵
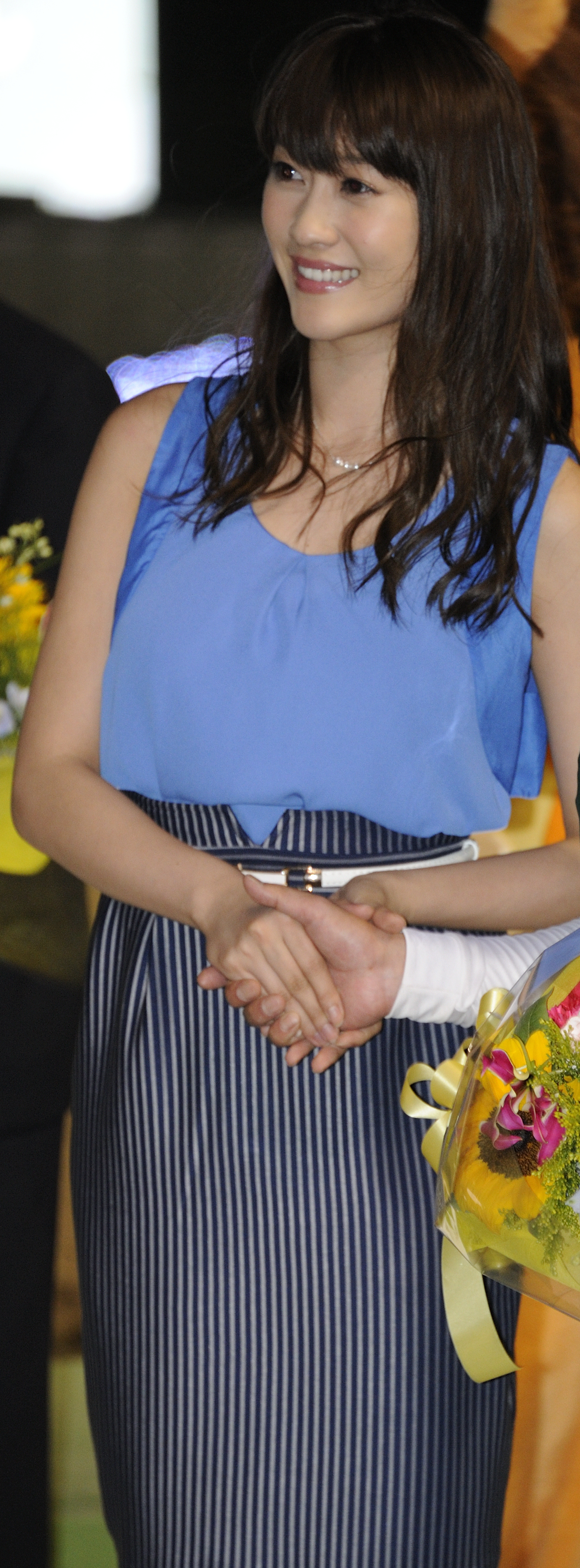
- Hara in 2015
- Born: July 3, 1987 (age 39); Murakami, Niigata, Japan
- Occupations: gravure idol; actress
- Years active: 2003–present
- Agent: Oscar Promotion
- Height: 163 cm (5 ft 4 in)
- Spouse: Unknown (m. 2025)
- Children: 1

Mikie Hara (原 幹恵, Hara Mikie; born July 3, 1987 in Murakami, Niigata) is a Japanese gravure idol and actress. Her debut role was in Cutie Honey: The Live as the lead role of Honey Kisaragi/Cutie Honey.

== Biography ==
Hara makes her debut as an gravure idol after winning Japan Bishōjo Contest in 2003.

On July 15, 2025, she suddenly announced her marriage during the variety show. On September 4, 2026, she gave birth to her first child.

== Filmography ==
=== TV Drama ===
Year	Title	Role
2007	Cutie Honey: The Live	Honey Kisaragi/Cutie Honey
2008	Last Mail	Shindo Kyoko
	Gira Gira	Sayo (Episode 1-2)
2009	Yakou no Kaidan	Tomoko Muraoka
2009-2010	Jyouou Virgin	Ando Mai
2010	Shinsengumi PEACE MAKER	Ayumu Yamazaki
	Sakurasaku ~ Watashi Wa Mirai o, Akiramenai ~	Sakura Kotani
	Kenzo Yabe, Lieutenant	Yuna Katagiri
	Jyouou 3 - Special Edition	Ando Mai
2011	Dr. Irabu, the Mental Specialist	Akane Irabu
	HUNTER - Women After Reward Money	Hitomi Muto
	Mitsuhiko Asami Series 41 - Sado's Legendary Murder Case	Ayako Komatsu
2012	Kuro no Kassōro 2 〜 Hanamuko ga Mita Akuma 〜	Shizuka Makimura
	Breathless Summer	Satsuki Igawa
	Akagawa Jirō Gensaku Doku < POISON >	Kyoko Yoshino (Episode 7)
	My Little Nightmare	Shiori Bandou (Episode 8)
	Special Drama For Matsumoto Seiji's Death's 20th Anniversary: Atsui Kūki	Masako Watanabe
2013	Bullshit Hero	Mari Shirai
	Yonimo Kimyona Monogatari 2013 Spring Special AIR Doctor	Harada
	Documentary Drama Great Series #21: `Kokoro o tsunaida takuto 〜 shiki-sha Koyama Usaburō 〜	Michiko Inoue
	Kagamihara yo taishi o dake!	Miki Murayama
2014	Morimura Seiichi's Hall Monitor 7: The Hotel King Dies Twice?!	Maho Momose
	Kyotaro Nishimura Travel Mystery 62: Cassiopeia Express & The Super Hitachi Serial Killer	Kaoru Tsuchihashi
	Fukuoka Love, White Paper, Looking Up At September's Sun & Moon	Mai Higuchi
	Tokumei Tantei Phase 2	Kaori Aida
2015	Age Harassment	Mika Noda
	Tax Inspector Madogiwa Taro: Case File 29	Mariko Inui
2016	Money Angel ~ I Will Get Your Money Back! ~	Machiko Uozumi (Episode 8)
	Friday Road SHOW! Special Drama: Tensai Bakabon Planning ~ Family Bonds ~	Ikemen's date
	BAR Lemon - Heart	Miyoko Funato (Season 2, Episode 25)
2017	Rental Lover	Yu Amato
	Gen Nama Bengoshi	Maki Shinohara

=== Films ===
Year	Title	Role
2010	Nigai Mitsu	Izumi
2011	HOTEL FLOWERS	Misono
2012	Afro Tanaka	Yumi
2012	Halcyon Skies	Nao Tagami
2012	Kamen Rider Fourze the Movie: Space, Here We Come!	Inga Blink
2012	Kamen Rider × Kamen Rider Wizard & Fourze: Movie War Ultimatum	Inga Blink
2014	Kamen Teacher The Movie	Touko Anami
2015	Happy Landing	Saori Takaishi
2017	Hurricane Polymar	Rei Hieda/Polymar Artemis
2017	Uchuu Keiji Gavan vs. Tokusou Sentai Dekaranger	Butterfly Ninja Benikiba
2017	Girls in Trouble: Space Squad Episode Zero	Butterfly Ninja Benikiba
2018	Leon	Mysterious Interviewer

=== Music video ===
Year	Title	Role
2018	Night Tempo x JQ from Nulbarich「夢の続き」	
