= Jikuu Keisatsu Hyperion =

Jikuu Keisatsu Hyperion (時空警察ハイペリオン, Jikū Keisatsu Haiperion; variably translated as Chrono Police Hyperion, Time Evaluation Tactics Hyperion and Hyper-Orion) is a 2009 Japanese tokusatsu film that serves as a prequel and a sequel to the 2007 television series Jikuu Keisatsu Wecker Signa. It was released in theaters on July 25, 2009, for a limited release, and then released on two DVDs on July 31, 2009. The DVD releases divide the story of the film into the 1989 storyline starring and the 2009 storyline. Sanshiro Wada, Showtaro Morikubo, Ryo Shihono, Ai Hazuki, and Takaou Ayatsuki return from Wecker Signa, and are joined by newcomers Takuma Terashima, Miyu Irino, Ayumi Murata, Ayano Niina, and Hikari Yamaguchi, and veteran actor Susumu Kurobe, known for his portrayal of the original Ultraman Shin Hayata. The film's soundtrack is performed by electronica group Fantastic Explosion. This film is followed by Jikuu Keisatsu Wecker SIGHT in 2011.

== Theme songs ==
Theme song

- "Parallel World" by Showtaro Morikubo

Film opening theme

- "Never Surrender" by Showtaro Morikubo

Film ending theme

- "Ima no Kimi ga Tōkutemo" (いまの君が遠くても; "Even Now You are Distant") by Aki Misato
