= Space Sheriff Sharivan =

- Genre: Tokusatsu; Superhero fiction; Space western
- Created by: Saburō Yatsude
- Developed by: Shozo Uehara
- Directed by: Yoshiaki Kobayashi
- Starring: Hiroshi Watari; Yumiko Furuya
- Narrated by: Issei Masamune
- Opening theme: Title song by Akira Kushida
- Ending theme: "Tsuyosa wa Ai da" by Akira Kushida
- Composer: Michiaki Watanabe
- Country of origin: Japan
- No. of episodes: 51

Production
- Producer: Toru Hirayama
- Running time: 25 minutes
- Production companies: Toei Company; Asatsu-DK

Original release
- Network: TV Asahi
- Release: March 4, 1983 – February 24, 1984

Related
- Space Sheriff Gavan; Space Sheriff Shaider

Space Sheriff Sharivan (宇宙刑事シャリバン, Uchū Keiji Shariban) is a Japanese Tokusatsu television show and the second installment in Toei's Metal Hero Series franchise and aired on TV Asahi from March 4, 1983 to February 24, 1984. It served as a direct sequel to its predecessor, Space Sheriff Gavan and featured many of the same characters.

For distribution purposes, Toei refers to this television series as Space Guardian Shariban.

== Plot ==
Initially appearing in Space Sheriff Gavan, Den Iga is attacked by a monster called Buffalo Doubler, a member of the Space Mafia Makuu. Den is seriously injured in the attack. He is later found by Gavan, who takes him to Planet Bird for medical assistance. Qom, leader of the Galaxy Federal Police (銀河連邦警察, Ginga Renpō Keisatsu), is impressed by Den's courage. Den returns in the final episode of Gavan, saving Gavan himself in his newly acquired form of Space Sheriff Sharivan during Gavan's final battle. After Don Horror is defeated, Sharivan is assigned to Earth and is partnered together with Lily from the planet Bird as he deals with the threat of the Madou Space Crime Syndicate on Earth.

== Cast ==
- Hiroshi Watari as Den Iga/Sharivan
- Yumiko Furuya as Lily
- Kenji Ohba as Retsu Ichijouji/Gavan
- Wakiko Kano as Mimi
- Toshiaki Nishizawa as Commander Qom
- Kyoko Nashiro as Marin
- Masayuki Suzuki as Kojiro Oyama
- Gozo Soma as Kappei Suzuki
- Midori Nakagawa as Chiaki Suzuki
- Yukari Aoki as Chie Suzuki
- Katsuya Koiso as Akira Suzuki
- Takeshi Watabe as Saint
- Shōzō Iizuka as Demon King Psycho
- Hitomi Yoshioka as Doctor Polter
- Satoshi Kurihara as General Gyrer
- Chieko Maruyama as Miss Akuma 1 (1-22, 48-51)
  - Miyuki Nagato as Miss Akuma 1 (23-47)
- Lala as Miss Akuma 2 (1-22),
  - Yui Mizuki as Miss Akuma 2 (23-50)
- Kazuyoshi Yamada as Umibōzu

=== Voice cast ===
- Issei Masamune as Narrator

=== Guest cast ===
- Boxer Beast (13), Keith (27, 50): Toshimichi Takahashi
- Denichiro Iga (13, 20, 35, 49, 51 – flashback): Tsunehiko Kamijo
- Tsukiko Hoshino (15, 34): Aiko Tachibana
- Hunter Killer (15 – flashback): Michiro Iida
- San Dorva (15 – flashback): Ken Nishida
- Voicer (15 – flashback): Sonny Chiba
- Miyuki (19-20, 31, 49-51): Sumiko Kakizaki
- Iga Girls (19-20, 31, 49-51)
  - Mai Oishi
  - Yukari Imaizumi
  - Kumi Shimada (19-20, 31)
  - Naohko Nomoto (19-20)
  - Noriko Kojima (19-20)
  - Mihoko Nomoto (31)
  - Misa Nirei (31)
  - Miho Shimoji (49-51)
  - Mami Yoshikawa (49-51)
- Shinigami Beast (human form; 22): Machiko Soga
- Rita (27, 36, 50): Sherry
- Moore (27): Isamu Shimizu
- Reider (34-50): Mitsuo Ando
- Yuhko Iga (35, 39, 51 – flashback): Yukiko Yoshino (Played as Keiko Yoshino)
- Helen Bell (36, 38-39, 42): Yuki Yajima
- Helen Bell (child; 38): Rie Yoshizawa

== Characters ==
=== Grand Berth ===
Based on the Grand Berth (グランドバース, Gurando Bāsu), it serves as headquarters of Den and Lily as it circles around the Earth. It has two modes: Battle Mothership mode able to fire the Berth Beam and the vaguely humanoid Battle Birth Formation that fires the Grand Buster and Plasma Cannon (the latter being based on the blueprints of the Space Cannon built by Voicer, Gavan's father).

- Den Iga (伊賀 電, Iga Den)
  A 19-year old young man that originally came from Inner Iga Island, he served as a part-time forest patroller until he was fatally wounded by Buffalo Doubler and saved by Gavan who brought him to Planet Bird to undergo special training to become Sharivan (シャリバン, Shariban), aiding Gavan during his final battle with the Makuu before being assigned to protect Earth in his predecessor's place. When he transforms with the command "Sekisha" (赤射, Sekisha; Red Shine), the Grand Berth envelops him with Solar Metal particles that it absorbs from solar flares to form his red-colored Combat Suit (コンバットスーツ, Konbatto Sūtsu) armor within milliseconds. As Sharivan, he wields the Laser Blade (レーザーブレード, Rēzā Burēdo) sword, which he uses in his signature move the Sharivan Crash, and the Crime Burster (クライムバスター, Kuraimu Basutā) handgun. Sharivan uses Prism Goggles to see objects clearly. It is a rectangular yellow glasses with crystal particles.
- Lily (リリー, Rirī)
  Sharivan's girlfriend from Planet Bird.

==== Arsenal ====
- Motosharian (モトシャリアン)
  Sharivan's motorcycle, capable of entry into the Phantom Dream World.
- Sharinger Tank (シャリンガータンク, Sharingā Tanku)
  Sharivan's tank, which splits into a flying upper half and treaded lower half.
- Mogriran (モグリラン, Moguriran)
  Sharivan's drill-headed vehicle.

=== Galactic Union Patrol ===
- Captain Gavan
  The Space Sheriff who was previously assigned on Earth.
- Organizers (オーガナイザー, Ōganaizā)
  The anti-Madou resistance, represented by Moore, Keith, and Rita, who aid Sharivan.
- Iga Warriors (伊賀戦士, Iga Senshi)
  The mystical warriors from Iga Planet to protect the wonders and civilizations of the Iga Crystal. Membered by Jack, Henry, Maria and Kirk
- Billy and Helen Bell (ビリーとヘレンベル, Birī to Heren Beru)
  Iga warrior siblings trained to be Space Sheriffs. After Billy is killed, Helen becomes Sharivan's apprentice to avenge his death.

=== Space Crime Syndicate Madou ===
The Space Crime Syndicate Madou (宇宙犯罪組織マドー, Uchū Hantsumi Soshiki Madō; literally "demon way") is an organization of psychic criminals whose headquarters, Genmu Castle (幻夢城, Genmu Shiro), lies within the Genmu World (幻夢界, Genmukai; Phantom Dream World) dimension, a "white hole" where all the matter sucked up by black holes ends up. The syndicate intends to conquer the universe through chaos created by its members' psionic abilities, along with their space fighters and the Madou Battleship.

- Demon King Psycho (魔王サイコ, Maō Saiko)
  The immobile ruler of Madou, able to project his consciousness into multiple forms such as his fully mobile cyborg body Psychorror which is armed with twin swords that emit lightning bolts. With Gavan dealing with Psychorror, Sharivan destroys Psycho. However, by the events of Kamen Rider × Super Sentai × Space Sheriff: Super Hero Taisen Z which introduced a detachment from his conscious named Psycholon, Psycho's true body is revealed to be Genmu Castle itself as he is revived from the energy of the Galactic Union Police's Super Dimension Cannon. However, Psycho is destroyed for good by the teamwork of the Space Sheriffs, the Kyoryugers and Kamen Rider Wizard.
- General Gyrer (ガイラー将軍, Gairā Shōgun)
  A black-armored field commander who is defeated by Sharivan. In the cross-over special episode, Retsu, Den and Dai mistakenly thought Gyrer had revived, but he was actually a vendor who just looks like Gyrer, much to the Trio's Surprise.
- Doctor Polter (ドクターポルター, Dokutā Porutā)
  A female strategist who dies fighting against Sharivan and Gavan.
- Reider (レイダー, Reidā)
  A mystic from the Death Spirit World who intended to take over Madou, only to be destroyed by Psychorror. But during the events of Kamen Rider × Super Sentai × Space Sheriff: Super Hero Taisen Z, Reider revived to aid in Psycho's resurrection through the Space Shocker organization he provides his magic to. Though killed, Reider is revived as Space Reider before being destroyed for good by Kamen Rider Beast and Kyoryu Gold.
- Miss Akuma 1 and 2 (ミスアクマ1ト2, Misu Akuma 1 to 2)
  Gyrer and Doctor Polter's female aides. Miss Akuma 2 was devoured by Gamagon. Miss Akuma 1 was killed along with her mistress while fighting Sharivan and Gavan.
- Soldier Psychoers (戦士サイコラー, Senshi Saikorā)
  Also referred to as Fighters, they serve as the foot soldiers of Madou in black tights decorated with lightning bolts.
- Bengel Brothers
  A pair of space pirates from Dark Cloud Mazalan that appear in episode 11 that briefly join the Madou named Bengel Tiger and Bengel Cobra. Both of them are quickly killed off by Sharivan's Crime Buster and their data was used to create Shouri Beast. Bengel Tiger's powers include mines, a sword, cloaking, hand flames called the Bengel Fire, explosive thread, and a bowie knife. Bengel Cobra's powers include mines, a spear, cloaking, hand flames called the Bengel Fire, explosive thread, and a wrist claw.

== Episodes ==
1. Vision (幻夢, Genmu) (Original Airdate: March 4, 1983): written by Shozo Uehara, directed by Yoshiaki Kobayashi
2. Spirit World New Town (魔界ニュータウン, Makai Nyū Taun) (Original Airdate: March 11, 1983): written by Shozo Uehara, directed by Yoshiaki Kobayashi
3. A Promise With Kumiko (久美子との約束, Kumiko to no Yakusoku) (Original Airdate: March 18, 1983): written by Shozo Uehara, directed by Hideo Tanaka
4. The Microcomputer Investigation (マイコン指名手配, Maikron Shimeitehai) (Original Airdate: March 25, 1983): written by Shozo Uehara, directed by Hideo Tanaka
5. Yohko of the Harbor Doesn't Forget the Melody of Love (港のヨーコは愛のメロディを忘れない, Minato no Yōko wa Ai no Merodi o Wasurenai) (Original Airdate: April 1, 1983): written by Shozo Uehara, directed by Takeshi Ogasawara
6. The Small Life Flying Through the Forest of the Battlefield (戦場の森をかける小さな命, Senjō no Mori o Kakeru Chiisa na Inochi) (Original Airdate: April 8, 1983): written by Shozo Uehara, directed by Takeshi Ogasawara
7. Who is the Me Floating in the Mirror!? (鏡の中に浮かぶ私は誰れ!?, Kagami no Naka ni Ukabu Watashi wa Dare!?) (Original Airdate: April 15, 1983): written by Shozo Uehara, directed by Yoshiaki Kobayashi
8. The Comeback Salmon Revived by the Lutaceous River (泥の河は甦える カムバック サーモン, Dorono Kawa wa Yomegaeru Kamubakku Sāmon) (Original Airdate: April 22, 1983): written by Susumu Takaku, directed by Yoshiaki Kobayashi
9. The Surprise House is at Vision Town, Address 0 (ビックリハウスは幻夢町0番地, Bikkuri Hausu wa Genmu Machi Zero Banchi) (Original Airdate: April 29, 1983): written by Shozo Uehara, directed by Hideo Tanaka
10. Vision Castle – Chase the Shadow of the Tokyo Express (幻夢城 – 東京 エキスプレスの影を追え, Genmu Shiro – Tōkyō Ekisupuresu no Kage o Oe) (Original Airdate: May 6, 1983): written by Shozo Uehara, directed by Hideo Tanaka
11. He Came From the Dark Nebula, the Strongest Villain, Fighter (暗黒星雲から来た 最強の悪役ファイター, Ankoku Seiun Kara Kita Saikyō no Akuyaku Faitā) (Original Airdate: May 13, 1983): written by Shozo Uehara, directed by Takeshi Ogasawara
12. An Alien's Smile; Operation My Friend (異星人のほほえみ マイフレンド作戦, Iseijin no Hohoemi Mai Furendo Sakusen) (Original Airdate: May 20, 1983): written by Shozo Uehara, directed by Takeshi Ogasawara
13. Strength is Love; The Heroes Set Off (強さは愛だ 英雄たちの旅立ち, Tsuyosa wa Ai da Eiyū-tachi no Tabidachi) (Original Airdate: May 27, 1983): written by Shozo Uehara, directed by Hideo Tanaka
14. The Billionaire Who's Scared of Recurring Nightmares (連続夢魔におびえる億万長者, Renzoku Muma ni Obieru Okumanchōja) (Original Airdate: June 3, 1983): written by Susumu Takaku, directed by Hideo Tanaka
15. The Island of the Sea-Rumbling Device (海鳴りの仕掛島, Uminari no Shikake Shima) (Original Airdate: June 10, 1983): written by Shozo Uehara, directed by Makoto Tsuji
16. The Dangerous Hit Song Sung by the Pretty Girl (美少女歌手が歌う危険なヒットソング, Bishōjo Kashu ga Utau Kiken na Hitto Songu) (Original Airdate: June 17, 1983): written by Shozo Uehara, directed by Makoto Tsuji
17. The Wondrous Extradimensional Trip of the New Model Double-Decker Bus (新型二階だてバスのふしぎな異次元旅行, Shingata Nikai Date Basu no Fushigi na I-jigen Ryokō) (Original Airdate: June 24, 1983): written by Shozo Uehara, directed by Takeshi Ogasawara
18. It's Summer! It's the Sea! The Meteor Group Who Attacks Izu Peninsula (夏だ! 海だ! 伊豆半島を襲うメテオの群, Natsu da! Umi da! Izuhantō o Osō Meteo no Gun) (Original Airdate: July 1, 1983): written by Shozo Uehara, directed by Takeshi Ogasawara
19. The Mysterious Girl Who Stands Alone on Makyō Cape (魔境岬に一人立つ神秘の少女, Makyō Misaki ni Hitori Tatsu Shinpi no Shōjo) (Original Airdate: July 8, 1983): written by Shozo Uehara, directed by Yoshiaki Kobayashi
20. The Prism Desert Island That Calls the Stormy Seas (荒波が呼ぶ七色水晶の孤島, Aranami ga Yobu Shichishoku Suishō no Kotō) (Original Airdate: July 15, 1983): written by Shozo Uehara, directed by Yoshiaki Kobayashi
21. The Secret Room's Fang – Lily Likes a Mystery (密室の牙・リリィはミステリーがお好き, Misshitsu no Kiba – Ririi wa Misuterī ga O-suki) (Original Airdate: July 22, 1983): written by Shozo Uehara, directed by Hideo Tanaka
22. The Temptation to Heaven That Attacks the Tennis Player (テニスプレーヤーを襲う天国への誘惑, Tenisu Purēyā o Osō Tengoku e no Yūwaku) (Original Airdate: July 29, 1983): written by Susumu Takaku, directed by Hideo Tanaka
23. Fear of the Copy Era; Big Gathering of Clone Humans (コピー時代の恐怖 そっくり人間大集合, Kopī Jidai no Kyōfu Sokkuri Ningen Dai Shūgō) (Original Airdate: August 5, 1983): written by Susumu Takaku, directed by Takeshi Ogasawara
24. The Japan Lazy Person Disease Transported by the Insect Hurricane (昆虫ハリケーンが運んだ日本なまけ者病, Konchū Harikēn ga Hakonda Nihon Namakemono Byō) (Original Airdate: August 19, 1983): written by Shozo Uehara, directed by Takeshi Ogasawara
25. Tears in a Demon's Eye – An Angel's Tears – Papa's Help is Coming (鬼の目に涙・天使の涙・パパ助けに来て, Oni no Me ni Namida – Tenshi no Namida – Papa Tasuke ni Kite) (Original Airdate: August 26, 1983): written by Shozo Uehara, directed by Hideo Tanaka
26. The Trap of Anger; The Great Makeup War (憎しみの罠 メイクアップ大戦争, Nikushimi no Wana Meikuappu Dai Sensō) (Original Airdate: September 2, 1983): written by Shozo Uehara, directed by Hideo Tanaka
27. The Treacherous Skies; The Fugitive From the Dark Jail (裏切りの空 暗黒刑務所からの逃亡者, Uragiri no Sora Ankoku Keimusho Kara no Tōbōsha) (Original Airdate: September 9, 1983): written by Susumu Takaku, directed by Takeshi Ogasawara
28. The Campus is an 80m Wind Speed Violent Storm (キャンパスは風速80Mの猛烈ストーム, Kyanpasu wa Sōsoku Hachijū Mētā no Mōretsu Sutōmu) (Original Airdate: September 16, 1983): written by Shozo Uehara, directed by Takeshi Ogasawara
29. Who is the Enemy? The Hot-Blooded Man Who Targets the Wilderness (敵は誰だ? 荒野をめざす熱血児, Teki wa Dare da? Areno o Mezasu Nekketsuji) (Original Airdate: September 23, 1983): written by Shozo Uehara, directed by Hideo Tanaka
30. The Abandoned Children; Transforming Mama (捨てられる子供たち 変身するママ, Suterareru Kodomo-tachi Henshin Suru Mama) (Original Airdate: September 30, 1983): written by Shozo Uehara, directed by Hideo Tanaka
31. Miyuki, Now? The Wandering Illusion Crystal (みゆきは今? さまよえる幻のクリスタル, Miyuki wa Ima? Samayoeru Maboroshi no Kurisutaru) (Original Airdate: October 7, 1983): written by Shozo Uehara, directed by Yoshiaki Kobayashi
32. The Vision Dream Device Orange and a Lullaby! (幻夢じかけのオレンジと子守唄!, Genmu Jikake no Orenji to Komoriuta!) (Original Airdate: October 14, 1983): written by Shozo Uehara, directed by Yoshiaki Kobayashi
33. An Instant Trip! Inside the Vision Castle are Bizarre Flowers in Full Bloom (瞬間旅行! 幻夢城内は怪奇の花ざかり, Shunkan Ryokō! Genmu Jōnai wa Kaiki no Hanazakari) (Original Airdate: October 21, 1983): written by Susumu Takaku, directed by Takeshi Ogasawara
34. The Hair-Raising Spirit is the Guide to the Ghost World (総毛立つ幽鬼は死霊界への案内人, Sōkedatsu Yūki wa Shiryō Kai e no Annai Hito) (Original Airdate: October 28, 1983): written by Shozo Uehara, directed by Takeshi Ogasawara
35. If You Fall, Stand up, Den! Love is the Radiance of Life (倒れたら立ちあがれ電! 愛は生命の輝き, Taoretara Tachiagare Den! Ai wa Seimei no Kagayaki) (Original Airdate: November 4, 1983): written by Shozo Uehara, directed by Hideo Tanaka
36. The Iga Warrior Team's Z Flag Rises in the Cloudy Space Sky (風雲の宇宙海にイガ戦士団のZ旗あがる, Fūun no Uchū Umi ni Iga Senshi Dan no Zetto Hata Agaru) (Original Airdate: November 11, 1983): written by Shozo Uehara, directed by Hideo Tanaka
37. The Bear-Hunting Grandpa Saw the Wondrous Poison Flower (不思議な毒花を熊狩りじいさんは見た, Fushigi na Doku Hana o Kumagari Jiisan wa Mita) (Original Airdate: November 18, 1983): written by Susumu Takaku, directed by Takeshi Ogasawara
38. Crazy Whispering Coup d'état, Visions of Dark Clouds (乱心ささやきクーデター暗雲の幻夢城, Ranshin Sasayaki Kūdetā An'un no Genmu jo) (Original Airdate: November 25, 1983): written by Shozo Uehara, directed by Takeshi Ogasawara
39. The Doll Knows the Wounds of the Iga Warrior's Heart (人形は知っているイガ戦士の心の傷を, Ningyō wa Shitte Iru Iga Senshi no Kokoro no Kizu o) (Original Airdate: December 2, 1983): written by Shozo Uehara, directed by Hideo Tanaka
40. The Fiery Car Chase, the Great Promise to Tear Bonds of Love (炎のカーチェイス 愛の絆を裂く大予言, Honō no Kā Cheisu Ai no Kizuna o Saku Dai Kanegoto) (Original Airdate: December 9, 1983): written by Shozo Uehara, directed by Hideo Tanaka
41. Phoenix!! Return to the Genmu World (不死鳥よ! 逆噴射の幻夢界へ舞いもどれ, Fushichō yo! Gyakufunsha no Genmukai e Maimodore) (Original Airdate: December 16, 1983): written by Shozo Uehara, directed by Michio Konishi
42. The Crimson Youth of the Female Warrior Who Ran Through the Battlefield (戦場を駆けぬけた女戦士の真赤な青春, Senjō o Kakenuketa Onna Senshi no Makka na Seishun) (Original Airdate: December 23, 1983): written by Shozo Uehara, directed by Michio Konishi
43. The Tears of a Mother and Child's Love Flow Down the Road to Heaven (母と子の愛の涙が天国への道に流れる, Haha to Ko no Ai no Namida ga Tengoku e no Michi ni Nagareru) (Original Airdate: December 30, 1983): written by Susumu Takaku, directed by Hideo Tanaka
44. The Midnight Cinderella is Full of the Aroma of Roses (バラの香りに満ちた真夜中のシンデレラ, Bara no Kaori ni Michita Mayonaka no Shinderera) (Original Airdate: January 6, 1984): written by Shozo Uehara, directed by Hideo Tanaka
45. The Audition's Trap; The Big Little Child Star (オーディションの罠 ちびっ子大スター, Ōdishon no Wana Chibikko Dai Sutā) (Original Airdate: January 13, 1984): written by Shozo Uehara, directed by Hideo Tanaka
46. The Birthday Promise; The Sky Cloud That Draws a Dream to the Heavens (誕生日の約束 大空に夢をえがく飛行雲, Tanjōbi no Yakusoku Ōzora ni Yume o Egaku Hikō Kumo) (Original Airdate: January 20, 1984): written by Keiji Kubota, directed by Michio Konishi
47. The Older Brother and Younger Sister Who Wish For Happiness; Sparks Fall, Holy Sword, Evil Sword (幸福をねがう兄と妹 火花散る正剣邪剣, Kōfuku o Negau Ani to Imōto Hibana Chiru Seiken Jaken) (Original Airdate: January 27, 1984): written by Akiyuki Yuyama, directed by Michio Konishi
48. Mimi (ミミー, Mimī) (Original Airdate: February 3, 1984): written by Shozo Uehara, directed by Hideo Tanaka
49. Gamagon (ガマゴン, Gamagon) (Original Airdate: February 10, 1984): written by Shozo Uehara, directed by Hideo Tanaka
50. Umibozu (海坊主, Umibōzu) (Original Airdate: February 17, 1984): written by Shozo Uehara, directed by Hideo Tanaka
51. Sekisha – Jouchaku (赤射・蒸着, Sekisha – Jōchaku) (Original Airdate: February 24, 1984): written by Shozo Uehara, directed by Hideo Tanaka

== Home media ==
The series was released on Blu-ray in North America via Discotek Media on February 27, 2024.

== Songs ==
The opening theme is "Space Sheriff Sharivan" (宇宙刑事シャリバン, Uchū Keiji Shariban), and the ending theme is "Tsuyosa wa Ai da" (強さは愛だ; "Strength is Love"). Both pieces are performed by Akira Kushida, with lyrics by Keisuke Yamakawa and composition and arrangement by Michiaki Watanabe.
