= Toomi =

Japanese gravure idol and actress (born 1999)

- 十味
- Born: February 8, 1999 (age 27); Nagano Prefecture, Japan
- Occupations: Gravure idol; actress; media personality
- Years active: 2018–present
- Agent: 01familia
- Modeling information
- Height: 149 cm (4 ft 11 in)

YouTube information
- Channel: toomi
- Years active: 2025–present
- Genre: Gravure modeling
- Subscribers: 13,700
- Views: 358,419
- Last updated: 16 November 2026
- Musical career
- Genre: J-pop
- Years active: 2020–2025
- Formerly of: #2i2
- Website: Official website

Toomi (Japanese: 十味, Hepburn: Tōmi; born February 8, 1999) is a Japanese gravure idol, actress, and media personality. She starred in the film Afterschool Anglers Club (2023) and the television series My Tiny Senpai (2025). She was also the runner-up of the Miss iD 2019 beauty pageant. She is represented by 01familia.

Toomi gained early recognition by self-publishing her dance videos on the video sharing site Niconico. She was scouted by her agency and made her gravure modeling debut in 2018. She was the leader of the agency's idol group #2i2 (pronounced "nīni") from its 2020 formation to 2025 disbandment.

== Early life ==
Toomi was born in Nagano Prefecture. Her father was a ski instructor and she began skiing at the age of four. She skied competitively as a child and has placed fourth in a national competition, before quitting as she entered middle school.

Toomi played the piano and joined the brass band club in middle school. She also trained in hip-hop dance and jazz dance, and found some recognition after uploading her dance videos to the video sharing site Niconico while in high school, which led to invitations to perform in events across the country. Her stage name is inspired by the city Tōmi (東御市, Tōmi-shi) near her hometown. She also auditioned for Hello! Project as a high school student. She obtained a scholarship and moved to Tokyo to study economics at university after graduating from high school.

== Career ==
After she entered university, Toomi was scouted by her agency and joined in June 2018, as it also represented model and actress Nashiko Momotsuki, whom she admired. She made her magazine debut in the July edition of publisher Shueisha's Weekly Young Jump magazine, which named her the "last miraculous raw gemstone of Heisei", and became its cover model for the first time two months later. She was the runner-up of the Miss iD 2019 beauty pageant and won two of the event's popularity poll categories.

On February 2, 2020, Toomi's first photobook was released, published by Shueisha. It was photographed in Hawaii and Nagano Prefecture and titled Toominico (とーみにこ), a reference to her Twitter account name, the video sharing site Niconico, and her small ("mini") physical stature. The book sold around 5000 copies within two weeks and placed fifth on the Oricon Weekly Photobook chart.

In December 2020, Toomi joined the girl group #2i2 (pronounced "nīni") and was appointed its main vocalist and leader as the most senior member. The group disbanded in December 2025.

Toomi made her film debut as the lead of 2023's Afterschool Anglers Club, directed by Hideo Jojo. She went on to appear in the streaming film Yodonna the Final (2024), starring Nashiko Momotsuki, and star in the television drama adaptation of My Tiny Senpai (2025) on BS Shochiku Tokyu, which features "Hatsukoi Juice" by #2i2 as its opening song.

Toomi's second photobook, titled Pomi (ぽみ) and photographed in Australia, was again published by Shueisha on February 8, 2026. It has been described as her most "revealing" work at the time, and she remarked that she had managed to expand her range of expressions and called it her "best work". The book sold around 3500 copies in its release week and placed third on the Oricon Weekly Photobook chart.

== Personal life ==
Toomi enjoys online mahjong.

== Filmography ==
=== Film ===
| Date | Title | Role | Notes | Ref(s) |
|---|---|---|---|---|
| 2023 | Afterschool Anglers Club | Mezashi Oikawa | Lead role | |
| 2024 | Yodonna the Final | Salvia | Streaming film | |

=== Television series ===
| Date | Title | Role | Notes | Ref(s) |
|---|---|---|---|---|
| 2021 | Girl Gun Lady | Masami Nakasaki | | |
| 2022 | Avataro Sentai Donbrothers | Karin | Episode 12 | |
| 2024 | Oshi no Ko | Lala | | |
| 2025 | My Tiny Senpai | Shiori Katase | Lead role | |

=== Variety show ===
| Date | Title | Role | Notes | Ref(s) |
|---|---|---|---|---|
| 2019 | Ototto Joshi Tabi | Traveler (as herself) | July 24 | |

=== Commercial ===
- Kimura Tōfu Shop, "Apricot Kernel Kisses are Zero Calorie" (2018, Hakuhodo)

=== Music video ===
- Naoto Inti Raymi, "Start To Rain" (2018)

== Theater ==
| Date | Title | Role | Venue(s) | Notes | Ref(s) |
|---|---|---|---|---|---|
| 2027 | Girls Band Cry | Hina | Sunshine Theatre | | |

== Radio ==
- Junya Maesako & Toomi's Soundbox (前迫潤哉＆十味 音の箱, Junya Maesako & Tōmi no Oto no Hako), Nippon Cultural Broadcasting (2021−2023)

== Bibliography ==
- Toominico (2020, photobook), Shueisha, ISBN 978-4-08-780893-3
- Pomi (2026, photobook), Shueisha, ISBN 978-4-08-790221-1
- Bijyoline Visual Mook Vol. 1: Toomi — Ten Flavors (Note: The literal meaning of the kanji characters of her name) (美女ラインビジュアルムック Vol.1 十味『Ten Flavors』) (2026, visual mook), AWorld
