= 01familia =

Japanese talent agency

Coordinates: 35.6933537°N 139.6894509°E

01familia, Co., Ltd.
- Native name
- Kanji: 株式会社01familia
Transcriptions
- Revised Hepburn: Kabushiki-gaisha Zeroichi Famiria
- Type: Kabushiki gaisha
- Founded: August 2015
- Headquarters: 6-chōme-12-7 Nishishinjuku, Shinjuku City, Tokyo 160-0023, Japan
- Key people: Yoshimi Hasegawa (representative director); Kotaro Inomata (director); Takeshi Noda (director)

YouTube information
- Channel: Zeroichi TV
- Years active: 2021–present
- Subscribers: 191,000
- Views: 54,743,962
- Last updated: 27 August 2026

01familia (Japanese: ゼロイチファミリア, Hepburn: Zeroichi Famiria) is a Japanese talent and modeling agency.

== History ==
01familia was established in 2015 with an all-female talent roster which included models, tarento, actresses, and race queens. In February, talents affiliated with the company filled all the photo spread pages of issue number 9 of Weekly Playboy published that month, which the company referred to as the "Weekly Playboy Hijack". It was the first time in the magazine's history that a single company has dominated all the photo pages. The March 2021 special edition issue of the magazine B.L.T. would feature another "Zeroichi Hijack".

In 2020, three of the company's talents starred in three different popular tokusatsu franchises: Nashiko Momotsuki portrayed Yodonna in Mashin Sentai Kiramager, Hikari Kuroki played Yuka Ōta in Ultraman Z, and Mei Angela portrayed Reika Shindai/Kamen Rider Sabela in Kamen Rider Saber. Weekly Playboy named them the "Tokusatsu Three Sisters" in a March 2021 interview.

In October 2021, the company launched its official YouTube channel, Zeroichi TV, and first terrestrial monthly television program, Zeroichi Familia wa Homeraretai (ゼロイチファミリアは褒められたい; lit. '01familia wants to be praised'), on MBS TV. On 19 of the same month, the agency signed its first male affiliate, Ura Nanase.

== Notable talents ==
- Hikaru Aoyama
- Nashiko Momotsuki
- Toomi
- Kanon Ishikawa (former SKE48)
- Kaho Mori (former STU48)
- Sumire Yokono (former NMB48)
- Yui Kato (former SKE48)
- Sara Hoshino (former HKT48)
