= Apple Pen =

Apple Pen may refer to:

- PPAP (Pen-Pineapple-Apple-Pen), a single by Japanese comedian Daimaou Kosaka
- Apple Pencil, a line of wireless stylus pens by Apple Inc.
