= My Tiny Senpai =

Japanese manga series

- First tankōbon volume cover, featuring Shiori Katase

うちの会社の小さい先輩の話 (Uchi no Kaisha no Chiisai Senpai no Hanashi)
- Genre: Romantic comedy
- Manga
- Written by: Saisou
- Published by: Takeshobo
- English publisher: NA: J-Novel Club
- Imprint: Bamboo Comics
- Magazine: Storia Dash (April 3, 2020 – September 26, 2025); Takecomic (October 17, 2025 – present)
- Original run: April 3, 2020 – present
- Volumes: 13
- Anime television series
- Directed by: Mitsutoshi Satō
- Written by: Keiichirō Ōchi; Yasuko Aoki; Satoru Sugizawa
- Music by: Sumika Horiguchi
- Studio: Project No.9
- Licensed by: Crunchyroll
- Original network: ANN (TV Asahi, Nagoya TV)
- Original run: July 2, 2023 – October 1, 2023
- Episodes: 12
- Television drama
- Directed by: Masashi Komura; Kō Nishiguchi
- Produced by: Tatsuya Nagahara; Tōki Murasaki; Kyōhei Morinaga; Kazuhiro Gotō
- Written by: Masashi Komura; Kō Nishiguchi
- Music by: Hidekazu Sakamoto
- Studio: BS Shochiku Tokyu; LesPros Entertainment
- Original network: BS Shochiku Tokyu
- Original run: January 15, 2025 – March 26, 2025
- Episodes: 11
- icon

My Tiny Senpai (Japanese: うちの会社の小さい先輩の話, Hepburn: Uchi no Kaisha no Chiisai Senpai no Hanashi; lit. 'Story of a Small Senior in My Company') is a Japanese manga series written and illustrated by Saisou. It was serialized on Takeshobo's Storia Dash website from April 2020 to September 2025 before being transferred to the Takecomic website in October 2025. Its chapters have collected into thirteen tankōbon volumes as of September 2026. An anime television series adaptation produced by Project No.9 aired from July to October 2023. A live-action television drama adaptation aired from January to March 2025.

== Plot ==
Takuma Shinozaki is an office worker who is being mentored by a beautiful and diminutive young woman named Shiori Katase. Serving as his senpai, she likes to coddle him to ensure that he feels as relaxed as possible. In love with Katase, Shinozaki hopes that the time she spends with him is something more than just professional courtesy.

== Characters ==
Shiori Katase (片瀬 詩織里, Katase Shiori)
Voiced by: Hina Tachibana (Japanese); Megan Shipman (English)
Portrayed by: Toomi
Katase is a beautiful, kind, and diminutive young woman who serves as Shinozaki's senpai. She likes to make sure that Shinozaki feels comfortable while she is mentoring him. Initially oblivious to Shinozaki's crush on her, Katase slowly starts to develop feelings for him as they spend time together.
Takuma Shinozaki (篠崎 拓馬, Shinozaki Takuma)
Voiced by: Yuuki Shin (Japanese); Mark Allen Jr. (English)
Portrayed by: Tsubasa Takizawa
Shinozaki is a good-natured and timid office worker who serves as Katase's kōhai. He falls in love with Katase at first sight and only grows closer to her every day, hoping his relationship with her will blossom into something more than just coworkers. He often daydreams about Katase, which makes his crush on her all the more obvious to his coworkers, much to his embarrassment.
Chinatsu Hayakawa (早川 千夏, Hayakawa Chinatsu)
Voiced by: Yumiri Hanamori (Japanese); Mallorie Rodak (English)
Portrayed by: Mito Yukimi
Hayakawa is a childhood friend of Shinozaki's who works in the same department as him and Katase. An otaku, it is implied she secretly has feelings for Akina, even though he is completely oblivious.
Chihiro Akina (秋那 千尋, Akina Chihiro)
Voiced by: Nobunaga Shimazaki (Japanese); Ricco Fajardo (English)
Portrayed by: Kōsuke Suzuki
Akina is a department manager who is Katase, Shinozaki, and Hayakawa's boss. He likes to imagine his employees in different romantic scenarios, though is completely unaware of Hayakawa's secret feelings towards him.
Yutaka Shinozaki (篠崎 豊, Shinozaki Yutaka)
Voiced by: Mikako Komatsu (Japanese); Morgan Lauré Garrett (English)
Yutaka is Takuma's older sister. Due to her obsession with cute things, she approves of Katase's beauty and cute charms, and wants her brother to marry her.

== Media ==
=== Manga ===
Written and illustrated by Saisou, My Tiny Senpai was serialized on Takeshobo's Storia Dash website from April 3, 2020, to September 26, 2025. It was subsequently transferred over to the Takecomic website on October 17 of that same year. The first tankōbon volume was released on October 30, 2020. As of September 2026, thirteen volumes have been released. The series is set to end with its fourteenth volume in April 2027.

On February 14, 2025, J-Novel Club announced that they had licensed the series for English publication.

==== Volumes ====
No.	Original release date	Original ISBN	English release date	English ISBN
1	October 30, 2020	978-4-80-197105-9	April 30, 2025	978-1-71-834843-1
Chapters 1–23; Bonus Manga 1 (描き下ろしマンガ①, Kakioroshi Manga 1); Bonus Manga 2 (描き下ろしマンガ②, Kakioroshi Manga 2)
2	May 27, 2021	978-4-80-197306-0	November 12, 2025	978-1-71-834844-8
Chapters 24–38; Bonus Manga 1 (描き下ろしマンガ①, Kakioroshi Manga 1); Bonus Manga 2 (描き下ろしマンガ②, Kakioroshi Manga 2)
3	November 30, 2021	978-4-80-197476-0	December 31, 2025	978-1-71-834845-5
Chapters 39–46; Bonus Manga (描き下ろしマンガ, Kakioroshi Manga)
4	April 30, 2022	978-4-80-197615-3	March 11, 2026	978-1-71-834846-2
Chapters 47–53; Special Chapter (番外編, Bangai-hen); Bonus Manga (描き下ろしマンガ, Kakioroshi Manga)
5	October 17, 2022	978-4-80-197867-6	May 27, 2026	978-1-71-834847-9
Chapters 54–61; Special Chapter (番外編, Bangai-hen); Bonus Manga 1 (描き下ろしマンガ①, Kakioroshi Manga 1); Bonus Manga 2 (描き下ろしマンガ②, Kakioroshi Manga 2)
6	April 17, 2023	978-4-80-198009-9	August 19, 2026	978-1-71-834848-6
Chapters 62–70; Exclusive Chapter 1 (番外編①, Bangai-hen 1); Exclusive Chapter 2 (番外編②, Bangai-hen 2); Exclusive Chapter 3 (番外編③, Bangai-hen 3)
7	September 14, 2023	978-4-80-198156-0; 978-4-80-198167-6 (SE)	November 11, 2026	978-1-71-834849-3
Chapters 71–78; Extra Story 1 (おまけ話①, Omake-banashi 1); Extra Story 2 (おまけ話②, Omake-banashi 2); Bonus Manga 1 (描き下ろしマンガ①, Kakioroshi Manga 1)
8	February 17, 2024	978-4-80-198247-5	—	—
Chapters 79–86; Kakioroshi Manga (描き下ろしマンガ)
9	August 17, 2024	978-4-80-198384-7	—	—
Chapters 87–95
10	February 17, 2025	978-4-80-198556-8	—	—
Chapters 96–104; Kakioroshi Manga (描き下ろしマンガ)
11	August 16, 2025	978-4-80-198724-1	—	—
Chapters 105–114; Omake Manga (おまけマンガ)
12	March 17, 2026	978-4-80-198918-4	—	—
Chapters 115–123; Omake Manga (おまけマンガ); Kakioroshi Manga (描き下ろしマンガ)
13	September 16, 2026	978-4-80-199078-4; 978-4-80-199079-1 (SE)	—	—
Chapters 124–132

=== Anime ===
An anime television series adaptation was announced on October 17, 2022. It was produced by Project No.9 and directed by Mitsutoshi Satō, with scripts written by Keiichirō Ōchi, Yasuko Aoki, and Satoru Sugizawa, characters designed by Hayato Hashiguchi and Hiromi Ogata, and music composed by Sumika Horiguchi. The series aired from July 2 to October 1, 2023, on TV Asahi's NUMAnimation block. (Note: TV Asahi listed the series premiere at 25:30 on July 1, 2023, which is effectively July 2 at 1:30 a.m. JST.) The opening theme song is "Honey", performed by Tōya Kobayashi, and the ending theme song is "Sugar", performed by Yu-ka. Crunchyroll is streaming the series.

==== Episodes ====
No.	Title (Note: All English titles are taken from Crunchyroll.)	Directed by (Note: Information is taken from the ending credits of each episode.)	Written by	Storyboarded by	Original release date
1	"My Senpai Is Small and Cute"; Transliteration: "Uchi no Kaisha no Senpai wa Chiisakute Kawaii" (Japanese: うちの会社の先輩は小さくて可愛い)	Takafumi Hino	Satoru Sugizawa	Mitsutoshi Satō	July 2, 2023
2	"Despite Appearances, I'm More the Big Sister Type."; Transliteration: "Kō Miete Igai to Onē-san Desho?" (Japanese: こう見えて意外とお姉さんでしょ？)	Yōhei Fukui	Satoru Sugizawa	Yōhei Fukui, Kōji Yoshikawa & Hikaru Takeuchi	July 9, 2023
3	"Is This How I Look to You?"; Transliteration: "Watashi tte, Konna Fū ni Mieterun Desu ka?" (Japanese: 私って、こんな風に見えてるんですか？)	Tomofumi Nakahashi	Keiichirō Ōchi	Kōji Yoshikawa & Hikaru Takeuchi	July 16, 2023
4	"When It Comes to Him, I'm Not Sure Yet..."; Transliteration: "Shinozaki-san no Koto wa, Mada..." (Japanese: 篠崎さんの事は、まだ・・・)	Takanori Yano	Yasuko Aoki	Noriaki Saitō	July 30, 2023 (Note: This episode was delayed a week from its originally scheduled air date of July 23, 2023.) (Note: This episode aired at 1:50 a.m. JST, 20 minutes after the original air time on TV Asahi.)
5	"Shall We Go Somewhere Before We Head Home?"; Transliteration: "Yorimichi Shite Kaerimasen ka?" (Japanese: 寄り道して帰りませんか？)	Masayuki Matsumoto	Yasuko Aoki	Hiroyuki Shimazu	August 6, 2023
6	"I Can't Resist My Instincts!"; Transliteration: "Hon'nō ni Aragaenai!" (Japanese: 本能に抗えない！)	Akira Katō	Keiichirō Ōchi	Yōhei Fukui & Hiroaki Shimura	August 20, 2023 (Note: This episode was delayed a week from its originally scheduled air date of August 13, 2023.) (Note: This episode aired at 2:00 a.m. JST, 30 minutes after the original air time on TV Asahi.)
7	"You Sure You Don't Want One?"; Transliteration: "Hontō ni Iranain Desu ka?" (Japanese: 本当にいらないんですか？)	Tomofumi Nakahashi	Keiichirō Ōchi	Kōji Yoshikawa & Hikaru Takeuchi	August 27, 2023
8	"Isn't It Time for Good Boys to Go to Sleep?"; Transliteration: "Īko wa Nerujikan Desu yo?" (Japanese: 良い子は寝る時間ですよ？)	Takanori Yano	Yasuko Aoki	Hiroyuki Shimazu	September 3, 2023
9	"He Wants to Talk Privately..."; Transliteration: "Futarikkiri de Hanashitai Koto..." (Japanese: 2人っきりで話したい事・・・)	Akira Katō	Keiichirō Ōchi	Noriaki Saitō	September 10, 2023
10	"Even If We're Just Playing, He's My Kohai..."; Transliteration: "Gokko to wa Ie, Kōhai-san to..." (Japanese: ごっことはいえ、後輩さんと・・・)	Masayuki Matsumoto	Keiichirō Ōchi	Kōji Yoshikawa & Hikaru Takeuchi	September 17, 2023
11	"Can I Give You a Big Hug?"; Transliteration: "Gyutto Shite Mite Ii Desu ka?" (Japanese: ぎゅっとしてみていいですか？)	Park Hwan-Soo & Takanori Yano	Yasuko Aoki	Mitsutoshi Satō & Yū Nobuta	September 24, 2023
12	"A Story About the Tiny Senpai Where I Work"; Transliteration: "Uchi no Kaisha no Chiisai Senpai no Hanashi" (Japanese: うちの会社の小さい先輩の話)	Akira Katō	Keiichirō Ōchi	Hiroyuki Shimazu	October 1, 2023

=== Drama ===
A live-action television drama adaptation produced by BS Shochiku Tokyu and LesPros Entertainment was announced on November 15, 2024. Masashi Komura and Kō Nishiguchi wrote and directed the series, Hidekazu Sakamoto composed the music, and Tatsuya Nagahara, Tōki Murasaki, Kyōhei Morinaga, and Kazuhiro Gotō served as the producers. It aired on BS Shochiku Tokyu from January 15 to March 26, 2025. The opening theme song is "Hatsukoi Juice", performed by 2i2, while the ending theme song is "Memories" (メモリーズ), performed by Amayadori.

== Reception ==
In 2020, My Tiny Senpai ranked 11th in the Next Manga Awards in the web manga category. By August 2023, the manga had over one million copies in circulation. In 2025, the English version of the first volume of the manga was nominated for Best Lettering in the second edition of Anime NYC and Japan Society's American Manga Awards.

== See also ==
- She's My Knight, another manga series by Saisou
