= She's My Knight =

Japanese manga series

- First tankōbon volume cover

イケメン彼女とヒロインな俺!? (Ikemen Kanojo to Heroine na Ore!?)
- Genre: Romantic comedy
- Manga
- Written by: Saisou
- Published by: Kodansha
- English publisher: NA: Kodansha USA
- Magazine: Palcy
- Original run: October 22, 2019 – September 22, 2022
- Volumes: 3

She's My Knight (イケメン彼女とヒロインな俺!?, Ikemen Kanojo to Heroine na Ore!?; "A Handsome Like Her and A Heroine Like Me!?") is a Japanese manga series written and illustrated by Saisou. It was serialized in Kodansha's Palcy manga website and app from October 2019 to September 2022.

== Plot ==
Haruma is a popular teenage boy who wants to impress his crush, a tall and princely girl named Yuki. To his dismay, Yuki's tendency to act like the male love interest in a shōjo manga places Haruma into the more passive role of the "heroine" (the female protagonist of a shōjo manga).

== Publication ==
Written and illustrated by Saisou, She is My Knight was serialized in Kodansha's Palcy manga website from October 22, 2019, to September 22, 2022. It was collected in three tankōbon volumes from March 2020 to November 2022. The series is licensed in English by Kodansha USA.

No.	Original release date	Original ISBN	English release date	English ISBN
1	March 17, 2020	978-4-06-518900-9	March 30, 2021 (digital); December 5, 2023 (print)	978-1-64-651975-0
2	March 17, 2021	978-4-06-522669-8	July 27, 2021	978-1-63-699247-1
3	November 16, 2022	978-4-06-529871-8	March 21, 2023	978-1-68-491855-3

== See also ==
- My Tiny Senpai, another manga series by Saisou
