= List of Mashin Sentai Kiramager episodes =

Mashin Sentai Kiramager is a Japanese tokusatsu television series, the first series in the franchise filmed during the Reiwa period and the 44th entry of the Toei Company's long-running Super Sentai franchise produced by TV Asahi. The series follows the Kiramagers, Earthlings chosen by the extraterrestrial genie princess Mabushina of the planet Crystaria, as they fight back against the evil Yodonheim Empire's invasion of Earth.

== Episodes ==
No.	English title Original Japanese title	Written by	Original release date
0	"Mashin Sentai Kiramager: Episode Zero"; Transliteration: "Mashin Sentai Kirameijā Episōdo Zero" (Japanese: 魔進戦隊キラメイジャー エピソードＺＥＲＯ)	Naruhisa Arakawa; Ayumi Shimo	February 8, 2020 (Movie version); May 17, 2020 (TV Asahi version)
As the planet Crystaria is invaded by the Yodonheim Empire, King Oradin sends his daughter, Princess Mabushina, off-world with the five Kiramai Stones to continue the fight. Arriving on Earth, the alien princess joins forces with the Earth defense organization CARAT and its founder Muryo Hakataminami to find five individuals with strong Kiramental to bond with the Kiramai Stones and help her fend off the Yodonheim warriors sent to assassinate her. Over time, she recruits esports professional Tametomo Imizu, track-and-field athlete Sena Hayami, stunt actor Shiguru Oshikiri, and surgeon Sayo Oharu to become Kiramai Yellow, Green, Blue, and Pink and begin training under Muryo. Note: On May 17, an edited version of the movie aired in place of the regular episodes due to the COVID-19 pandemic.
1	"The Mashin Are Born!"; Transliteration: "Mashin Tanjō!" (Japanese: 魔進誕生！)	Naruhisa Arakawa	March 8, 2020
After conquering Crystaria, Yodonheim launches an invasion of Earth. Meanwhile, the four active Kiramagers look for their fifth and final member until they meet Juru Atsuta, a young artist with a burning passion for drawing. However, they find themselves wondering if he has the special prowess needed to become Kiramai Red. After Yodonheim's Yodon Army sends a Jamen Beast to level the city and endangers Juru's classmates, the Kiramagers soon find he is more than capable.
2	"Leader Certification"; Transliteration: "Rīdā no Shōmei" (Japanese: リーダーの証明)	Naruhisa Arakawa	March 15, 2020
Mabushina and most of the Kiramagers welcome a surprised Juru with open arms as their fifth member and leader, but Sena is not so sure about him yet. Just then, the Yodon Army sends a Jamenshi to attack the city and challenge the Kiramagers to a hellish version of rugby. When Sena is forced to choose between competing in a race and fighting, Juru uses his Kiramental to create Substitute'n, a blue crystal that can transform into a copy of anyone who touches it with the idea that it will race while Sena fights. However, a surprise arrival during the fight shows that Juru does have what it takes to be the leader.
3	"The Vice Guy! No Advice Needed"; Transliteration: "Manriki Yarō! Goiken Muyō" (Japanese: マンリキ野郎！御意見無用)	Naruhisa Arakawa	March 22, 2020
While fighting Manriki Jamen, the monster attaches a vise to Shiguru's head. Due to his reserved personality however, he continues working on a film he is currently involved in even in spite of it. While the others try to find the bar needed to loosen the vise and free him, Juru tries to get Shiguru to open up about why he is always seen as cold and methodical by everyone and help him unlock his Kiramental.
4	"The Princess of the Lost Kingdom"; Transliteration: "Bōkoku no Purinsesu" (Japanese: 亡国のプリンセス)	Naruhisa Arakawa	March 29, 2020
After defeating the Yodon Army's latest Jamenshi, a jet black Kiramai Stone appears instead of the usual Jamen Beast. When Mabushina arrives on the battlefield to investigate, her uncle, Galza, appears before her and the Kiramagers claiming he was manipulated into betraying Crystaria and becoming the Yodon Army's commander. The alien princess wants to believe him, but Juru and Tametomo suspect this could be a trap.
5	"Shovellow Coming Through!"; Transliteration: "Shoberō Makaritōru!" (Japanese: ショベローまかりとおる！)	Naruhisa Arakawa	April 5, 2020
The Yellow Kiramai Stone, Mashin Shovellow, demands to know why Tametomo is not the Kiramagers' leader after recognizing his partner's leadership qualities and questioning the rule behind whoever is partnered with the Red Kiramai Stone automatically becoming the leader. When three new Kiramai Stones are found on Earth, Tametomo sees this as an opportunity to prove that he has what it takes and potentially take Juru's position away from him. Following a disastrous mission however, he threatens to quit the Kiramagers until he eventually realizes he never wanted to be leader in the first place. After reconciling with his teammates, helping them recover the new Kiramai Stones, and defeat Yodonheim's latest Jamenshi, Tametomo becomes the Kiramagers' second-in-command and acting leader should anything happen to Juru.
6	"My Friend Turned Five"; Transliteration: "Tsure ga Go-sai ni Narimachite" (Japanese: ツレが5才になりまちて)	Ayumi Shimo	April 12, 2020
The Kiramagers face off against Galza and a camera-themed Jamenshi that has been making people disappear. As Sena and Shiguru vanish, Galza beats Sayo, causing her to lose her memories and mentally regresses to a five year-old state, leaving Juru and Tametomo to figure out how to get her memories and their friends back.
7	"Training for You"; Transliteration: "Torēningu o Kimi ni" (Japanese: トレーニングを君に)	Riku Sanjo	April 19, 2020
The Kiramagers put Juru through an intense training regimen to become a better leader. When they discuss making it harder however, he flees and explains to the Kiramai Stones that he fears objecting as he knows they are doing it for his benefit. Mabushina spies on the training, and sees that Juru is starting to hallucinate. Meanwhile, the Yodon Army's strategist, Carantula, sends two Jamenshi, one fire-themed and the other ice-themed, to attack the city and overwhelm the Kiramagers. Already weakened from the training, Juru struggles against the onslaught. He attempts to harness all of the Kiramental he can, only to collapse from exhaustion. Just as Galza joins the fight and goes for the finishing blow, a god-like being intervenes.
8	"The Lightning Speed Express"; Transliteration: "Ekusupuresu Denkōsekka" (Japanese: エクスプレス電光石火)	Riku Sanjo	April 26, 2020
Galza's attack is halted when a god-like being that only he and Juru can see intervenes. When Juru faints, the being vanishes, allowing the Kiramagers to escape. With Juru comatose from exhaustion, the Red Kiramai Stone, Mashin Fire, blames Juru's allies for pushing him too hard. Mabushina adds to this, citing that they cast aside his artistic skills, which is what makes his Kiramental strong and how he felt he could not possibly argue. Unbeknownst to them, Juru dreams of an encounter with Oradin. When he wakes up, he is mysteriously drawn to the secret warehouse housing the crystal Mabushina came to Earth in. Meanwhile, Galza attempts to harness the power of Jamental in preparation for a rematch. He discovers Juru and Mabushina and attempts to destroy her crystal, only for Juru to transform it into Mashin Express, which he uses to turn the tide against Yodonheim's latest Jamen Beast. Afterwards, Juru gets his retribution by forcing the others to undergo his own special training, an art class where he reveals how ruthless he can be.
9	"The Karuta Path of My Youth"; Transliteration: "Waga Seishun no Karuta-dō" (Japanese: わが青春のかるた道)	Naruhisa Arakawa	May 3, 2020
While jogging with Juru and Tametomo, Sena bumps into an old rival, Makino, who has mysteriously decided to give up on something. They later learn she was attacked by a karuta-themed Jamenshi, who has been affixing giant cards to people's foreheads and forcing them to participate in the Hyakunin Isshu Tournament of Hell. With her speed and karuta experience, Sena is the only one capable of saving the victims and defeating the Kiramagers' latest foe. However, she reveals that Makino was her best friend before she started insulting her and beating her at karuta, which crippled their friendship and Sena's confidence in her abilities. However, Juru wonders whether Makino said those things because she is afraid of Sena's skills.
10	"The Girl Who Chases After Shiguru"; Transliteration: "Shiguru Oikakeru Shōjo" (Japanese: 時雨おいかける少女)	Naruhisa Arakawa	May 10, 2020
Juru, Tametomo, and Sena fall under the spell of an internet idol with a possible connection to Yodonheim, but when Shiguru and Sayo try to stop her, he loses his composure around her as the idol has an obsessive crush on him.
SP–1	"Episodes 1 & 2 Unreleased Cut, Warehouse Release, Start Dash Once Again SP"; Transliteration: "Ichi Ni-wa Mikōkai Katto Kuradashi Ima Ichido Sutāto Dasshu Supesharu" (Japanese: 1・2話未公開カット蔵出し いまいちどスタートダッシュSP)	Naruhisa Arakawa	May 24, 2020
With her champions found and assembled, the newly formed Kiramagers fight to defend Mabushina and the Earth from the Yodonheim Empire. Note: This special contains deleted scenes previously cut from the first two episodes.
SP–2	"Kira Talk! The Partner-Loving Mashin"; Transliteration: "Kira Tōku! Aikata Daisuki Mashin" (Japanese: キラトーーク！ 相方大好き魔進)	Naruhisa Arakawa	May 31, 2020
In a spoof of Ametalk!, the Kiramai Stones share stories about their Kiramager partners in the style of a variety talk show.
SP–3	"Kira Talk! This Battle Is Amazing!!"; Transliteration: "Kira Tōku! Kono Batoru ga Sugoi!!" (Japanese: キラトーーク！ このバトルがスゴイ!!)	Naruhisa Arakawa	June 7, 2020
Continuing their variety talk show, the Kiramai Stones share stories about their past battles.
SP–4	"Galza and Carantula's Jamental Laboratory"; Transliteration: "Garuza to Kuranchura no Jamentaru Kenkyūjo" (Japanese: ガルザとクランチュラのジャメンタル研究所)	Naruhisa Arakawa	June 14, 2020
Galza and Carantula discuss the Jamenshi they have created to fight the Kiramagers as well as the former's Jamental abilities.
11	"Time Has Been Looped"; Transliteration: "Toki ga Kururi to" (Japanese: 時がクルリと)	Tete Inoue	June 21, 2020
After an encounter with a literally two-faced Jamenshi, Tametomo finds himself trapped in a time loop and fights to get free.
12	"The Nice Guy With the Wonder Drill"; Transliteration: "Wandā Doriru no Kaidanji" (Japanese: ワンダードリルの快男児)	Naruhisa Arakawa	June 28, 2020
While responding to an emergency in the mountains, Sayo inexplicably experiences a string of bad luck, from losing her Kiramai Changer to spraining her ankle while making her descent. Along the way, she runs into a man named Takamichi Crystaria who says he will get her down safely in exchange for a "Mamarina Funi Funi". Meanwhile, the other Kiramagers combat the Yodon Army's latest Jamenshi after it attacks a CARAT observatory.
13	"The Great Underground Battle"; Transliteration: "Chitei Daisensō" (Japanese: 地底大戦争)	Naruhisa Arakawa	July 5, 2020
The Kiramagers learn that Takamichi is Mabushina's foster brother, whom she resents for abandoning Crystaria before Yodonheim invaded to go treasure hunting. They ask him to join them, but Takamichi refuses, claiming he does not need their help despite asking his biological brother Muryo to build him his own Mashin. However, Juru believes he may be lying about what he really wants.
14	"The Solitary Ace"; Transliteration: "Kokō no Ēsu" (Japanese: 孤高のエース)	Ayumi Shimo	July 12, 2020
Takamichi officially joins the Kiramagers, but asserts that treasure hunting is still more important to him. While accompanying him on one such hunt, Juru finds a new Kiramai Stone, though Takamichi is not impressed by it. Meanwhile, the other Kiramagers attempt to fight a locomotive-themed Jamenshi who claims to not have time to fight them.
15	"Listen to Takamichi's Voice"; Transliteration: "Kike, Takamichi no Koe" (Japanese: きけ、宝路の声)	Kaori Kaneko	July 19, 2020
After noticing Takamichi is still keeping his distance and straining his relationship with Mabushina even further, Shiguru steps in to try and alleviate the situation. Concurrently, while trying to take her mind off her foster brother, Mabushina gets captured by Carantula, who has come to Earth to challenge the Kiramagers personally.
16	"Marshmallow Royale"; Transliteration: "Mashumarowaiaru" (Japanese: マシュマロワイアル)	Tete Inoue	July 26, 2020
The Kiramagers try to fight a marshmallow-themed Jamenshi capable of turning people into marshmallows and deflecting any attack directed against him with his elastic body, but Takamichi is unable to fight due to a childhood fear of marshmallows and a secret involving his pre-Crystarian life on Earth. In response, Sena comes up with a solution to help remedy her friend's problem.
17	"The Mansion's Rare Stone"; Transliteration: "Yōkan no Kiseki" (Japanese: 洋館の奇石)	Riku Sanjo	August 2, 2020
Following a fierce battle with a hammer-themed Jamenshi, the battered Kiramagers return to CARAT HQ and learn from Muryo that Takamichi's Kiramai Mashin's mecha mode will be able to stop it. The only problem is that he lacks a Kiramai Stone to help it transform. Meanwhile, Takamichi claims to have found the treasure he has been seeking, but requires Tametomo's help to retrieve it. Mabushina implores her foster brother to stay and help, but Tametomo agrees to leave and help Takamichi despite the latter's reluctance to reveal what the treasure is.
18	"Falling into Darkness"; Transliteration: "Yami-ochi" (Japanese: 闇落ち)	Riku Sanjo	August 9, 2020
Takamichi begins to prioritize finding the four Kanaema Stones, jewels capable of granting any wish once they are all found, so he can save Mabushina. However, Galza takes control of him and forces him to attack his comrades. Takamichi begs them to kill him before it is too late, but Juru refuses to give up on him.
19	"Partners"; Transliteration: "Aibō" (Japanese: 相棒)	Kaori Kaneko	August 16, 2020
While giving drawing lessons at a local school, Juru struggles to help an unenthusiastic boy get involved. Complicating matters, the Kiramagers and Kiramai Stones end up switching bodies after getting hit with a strange beam following a battle with Galza, and Fire decides to take Juru's place at school.
20	"A Dangerous Pair"; Transliteration: "Abunai Pea" (Japanese: あぶないペア)	Ayumi Shimo	August 23, 2020
When the Kiramagers get called in to stop a glue-themed Jamenshi, Juru's classmate, Mizuki Kakihara, follows him on his way out in an attempt to figure out where he keeps running off to. During the fight, she accidentally gets stuck to Kiramai Red. Though the others try to protect his secret identity, Takamichi unwittingly blurts it out, forcing Juru to come clean. As the inseparable pair begin to learn more about how they see each other, Mizuki starts to see him in a new light.
21	"Fishing, Sometimes a Master"; Transliteration: "Tsure, Tokidoki Tatsujin" (Japanese: 釣れ、ときどき達人)	Naruhisa Arakawa	August 30, 2020
As Shiguru continues to practice with his Kiramental, Takamichi searches for the next Kanaema Stone, but a fishing-themed Jamenshi steals it before he can get to it. Suddenly, Mabushina begins to emit a purple light, confirming Takamichi's fears that she is being afflicted by the Yodonheim witch, Numajo's, curse.
22	"Are You Ready? Hey You Witch!"; Transliteration: "Kakugo wa Ii ka Soko no Majo" (Japanese: 覚悟はいいかそこの魔女)	Naruhisa Arakawa	September 6, 2020
The Kiramagers use the power of the Reversia Kanaema Stone to travel to the past in order to restore the Aqua Kiramai Stone, which they need to break the curse threatening Mabushina's life, but they will have to carry out the task without causing a paradox.
23	"Mabushina's Mother"; Transliteration: "Mabushīna no Haha" (Japanese: マブシーナの母)	Ayumi Shimo	September 13, 2020
The Kiramagers are happy to learn that Mabushina's mother, Queen Mabayuine, is alive, but they are worried about how she will react when she discovers what happened to her husband and home planet.
24	"Let's Start a Band!"; Transliteration: "Bando Shichau zo!" (Japanese: バンドしちゃうぞ！)	Tete Inoue	September 20, 2020
To encourage one of Sayo's patients who is about to undergo surgery, the Kiramagers join together to form a band, but their plans are hindered when one of Yodonheim's monsters attack him.
25	"That Cute Shrine Maiden"; Transliteration: "Kawaii Ano Miko" (Japanese: 可愛いあの巫女)	Naruhisa Arakawa	September 27, 2020
Despite being at ease now that both Mabushina and her mother are safe, Takamichi keeps searching for the Kanaema Stones, hoping to use their power to restore Crystaria. The search for the third stone leads the Kiramagers to a shrine in the forest, where Tametomo becomes infatuated with a beautiful shrine maiden.
26	"Make It an Arrow Weapon"; Transliteration: "Arō na Buki ni Shitekure" (Japanese: アローな武器にしてくれ)	Naruhisa Arakawa	October 4, 2020
The Kiramagers are taken off-guard by the arrival of Yodonna, the personal aide to Emperor Yodon, and must fight against all odds to stop her plan to open a massive portal between Earth and Yodonheim.
27	"Runner in a Big Pinch"; Transliteration: "Dai Pinchi Ran'nā" (Japanese: 大ピンチランナー)	Michiko Yokote	October 11, 2020
Despite excelling as a Kiramager, Sena finds her athletic career is falling short, so she receives help from Miki and Natsume Masaki of her sponsor company, SCRTC, to get back into shape. However, Yodonna rigs her new training gear to explode should she stop running while her teammates are forced to confront the Yodon Army's latest Jamenshi. Note: This episode pays tribute to Juken Sentai Gekiranger.
28	"Shiguru Cries"; Transliteration: "Shiguru Naki" (Japanese: 時雨泣き)	Kaori Kaneko	October 18, 2020
The Kiramagers' mecha are badly damaged from their latest fight, and their only chance to save them is for Juru and Shiguru to persuade Mashin Hakobu to lend his assistance to them.
29	"Atamald of Illusions"; Transliteration: "Maboroshi no Atamarudo" (Japanese: まぼろしのアタマルド)	Tete Inoue	October 25, 2020
With Mashin Hakobu's help, the Kiramagers set off for the mystical land of Atamald to restore their Kiramai Mashin. Upon their arrival however, they learn that the land has become distorted and dangerous with Oradin's absence.
30	"The Proud Super Warrior"; Transliteration: "Hokori Takaki Chō Senshi" (Japanese: 誇り高き超戦士)	Ayumi Shimo	November 8, 2020
After rescuing Oradin, Muryo takes the Kiraful Go Arrow and leaves without warning the others, who are worried and curious about what he intends to do.
31	"Toys"; Transliteration: "Omocha" (Japanese: おもちゃ)	Naruhisa Arakawa	November 15, 2020
During a fight with the Yodon Army's latest Jamenshi, Juru, Takamichi, and the Kiramai Mashin are shrunk by its power. While trying to figure out how to get back to their normal size, they are taken in by a boy who mistakes them for toys.
32	"There's Something About Sayo"; Transliteration: "Sayo ni Kubittake" (Japanese: 小夜に首ったけ)	Naruhisa Arakawa	November 22, 2020
When Sayo is invited by a friend for a date, the other Kiramagers are curious about her relationship with him until they are called to fight another enemy, unaware that Carantula, Yodonna, and Galza are preparing the finishing touches to their greatest scheme yet.
33	"The Giant Monster Panic Clash!"; Transliteration: "Kyojū Panikku Daigekitotsu!" (Japanese: 巨獣パニック大激突！)	Naruhisa Arakawa	November 29, 2020
The Kiramagers face an unprecedented crisis when Sayo is captured by Yodonna, an alien plant threatens Earth's environment, several Jamen Beasts appear at once, and Galza invades Atamald to seal Oradin.
34	"A Blue and Yellow Passion"; Transliteration: "Ao to Ki no Netsujō" (Japanese: 青と黄の熱情)	Kaori Kaneko	December 6, 2020
After having foiled Yodonheim's great plan, Tametomo and Shiguru enjoy a game of billiards, unaware that Yodonna is coming up with another scheme using the late Numajo's body.
35	"A Wandering Mabushina"; Transliteration: "Mabushīna Hōrōki" (Japanese: マブシーナ放浪記)	Tete Inoue	December 13, 2020
After Mabushina awakens from causing havoc while she was drunk, Takamichi goes missing and rest of the team help her retrace her steps in order to look for him.
36	"Rap"; Transliteration: "Rappu" (Japanese: RAP【ラップ】)	Ayumi Shimo	December 20, 2020
The Kiramagers make preparations to celebrate a Crystarian holiday when Carantula returns to Earth to promote a rap battle as part of his latest scheme. Amidst the battle, Yodonna splits Carantula into five duplicates of himself, leading to the Kiramagers destroying one of them before he is re-fused.
37	"Sena 1/5"; Transliteration: "Sena Go-bun-no-ichi" (Japanese: せな1/5)	Naruhisa Arakawa	December 27, 2020
Yodonna confronts the Kiramagers while seeking out Oradin on Emperor Yodon's orders and accidentally uses her powers on Sena, splitting her into five duplicates, each embodying a different personality trait. While the Kiramagers seemingly resolve the issue by merging four of the Senas together, the one that embodies her negativity runs off, believing she is only a hindrance to the rest of herself. Sayo helps negative Sena understand her purpose in keeping Sena from getting too reckless as the other Kiramagers find out while fighting Galza. Though the Kiramagers fully restore Sena, everyone is caught off-guard when Yodonna suddenly transforms into Yodon himself for a brief overwhelming display of his power.
38	"Under Uncle's Moon"; Transliteration: "Oji no Tsuki o Miteiru" (Japanese: 叔父の月を見ている)	Tete Inoue	January 10, 2021
While the other Kiramagers are fighting a Jamenshi that is tormenting earthlings with cavities, Takamichi believes that he is about to face Galza in a traditional Crystarian duel, little realizing he is under the effect of an illusion cast by the final Kanaema Stone.
39	"The Emperor Is a Sniper"; Transliteration: "Kōtei wa Sunaipā" (Japanese: 皇帝はスナイパー)	Kaori Kaneko	January 17, 2021
Takamichi looks for a present for Mabushina's coming of age ceremony, unaware that she is being targeted by Shadon, a sniper and another of Yodon's alternate personalities. Despite several difficulties, Tametomo succeeds in destroying Shadon.
40	"The Pained"; Transliteration: "Itamu Hito" (Japanese: 痛む人)	Tomihiko Tokunaga	January 24, 2021
Juru befriends a fellow illustrator and pays him a visit. Meanwhile, Carantula comes up with a new scheme, which makes use of the Illusia Kanaema Stone in Yodonheim's possession and a Jamenshi capable of disguising himself as anyone they choose.
41	"I Want to Be as I Am"; Transliteration: "Ari no Mama de Itai" (Japanese: ありのままでいたい)	Michiko Yokote	January 31, 2021
Following the death of one-fifth of himself and losing his rap battle to the Kiramagers, Carantula fears that he has fallen into a slump when it comes to making Jamenshi. When Yodonna accuses him of prioritizing useless traits for them instead of power, Carantula attempts to create the strongest and evilest Jamenshi yet.
42	"A Battle Without Honor and Humanity"; Transliteration: "Jingi Naki Tatakai" (Japanese: 仁義なき戦い)	Ayumi Shimo	February 7, 2021
Galza convinces Emperor Yodon to absorb him as Shadon's replacement and uses his new power to create a mist that corrupts everything it touches. The Kiramagers confront Yodon in an attempt to stop it until Galza reveals his true intentions.
43	"The Dirty Hero"; Transliteration: "Yogoreta Eiyū" (Japanese: 汚れた英雄)	Naruhisa Arakawa	February 14, 2021
The Kiramagers depart to Yodonheim to rescue Oradin from Galza, who has taken Yodon's power for himself. Meanwhile, Juru confronts Galza and discovers that he was secretly corrupted by Yodon as a child. Following this, Yodon reveals he never lost control and removes Galza from his body upon learning of the Kiramagers' intentions with the Kanaema Stones before seemingly killing him and Juru.
44	"Rest in Peace, My Friend"; Transliteration: "Tomo yo, Shizuka ni Nemure" (Japanese: 友よ、静かに眠れ)	Naruhisa Arakawa	February 21, 2021
Having regained control of his body, Yodon invades Earth to assemble the Kanaema Stones and fulfill his wish to conquer the entire universe. Meanwhile, the Kiramagers are still devastated by Juru's apparent death and must fight Yodon without their leader. Though they formulate a plan to trap Yodon and force him to assume Yodonna's form to destroy him, Yodon thwarts the attempt by fatally wounding her.
45 (Final)	"You Were There, and Shined"; Transliteration: "Kimi-tachi ga Ite Kagayaita" (Japanese: 君たちがいて輝いた)	Naruhisa Arakawa	February 28, 2021
Through Galza's sacrifice, Juru was rescued and able to rejoin his companions. Reunited, the six Kiramagers confront Yodon one last time, determined to stop his ambitions once and for all.
