= Yume Shinjo =

Japanese gravure idol and actress (born 1998)

- Born: April 27, 1998 (age 28); Gunma Prefecture, Japan
- Occupations: Gravure idol, actress
- Years active: 2018–2024
- Height: 160 cm (5 ft 3 in)

Yume Shinjo (新條 由芽, Shinjo Yume), (born April 27, 1998) is a former Japanese gravure idol and actress who is known for portraying Sena Hayami in Mashin Sentai Kiramager. She is previously represented by A-Plus.

== Biography ==
Yume Shinjo was born in Gunma Prefecture.

In 2018, she made her debut as a model signed by A-Plus agency.

In 2020, she was cast in Mashin Sentai Kiramager as Sena Hayami/Kiramai Green.

In January 2024, she announced her retirement from the entertainment industry effective that March.

== Filmography ==
=== TV dramas ===
Year	Title	Role	Notes	Ref.
2019	Mr. Hiiragi's Homeroom	Reo Kanazawa		
2019	Nippon Noir: Detective Y's Rebellion	Reo Kanazawa	Episode 10	
2020	Mashin Sentai Kiramager	Sena Hayami/Kiramai Green		
2021	The High School Heroes	Junka Mishima	Episodes 1-2	
2022	Detective Is Too Early: Spring Trick Return Festival	Mao Nakamura		
2023	Akai Ringo	Misora "Uchura" Uchuu		

=== Films ===
Year	Title	Role	Notes	Ref.
2020	Mashin Sentai Kiramager: Episode Zero	Sena Hayami/Kiramai Green		
2020	Mashin Sentai Kiramager: Be-Bop Dream	Sena Hayami/Kiramai Green		
2021	Mashin Sentai Kiramager vs. Ryusoulger	Sena Hayami/Kiramai Green		
2022	Kikai Sentai Zenkaiger vs. Kiramager vs. Senpaiger	Sena Hayami/Kiramai Green		
