= J:COM =

Japanese cable TV company

JCOM Co., Ltd.

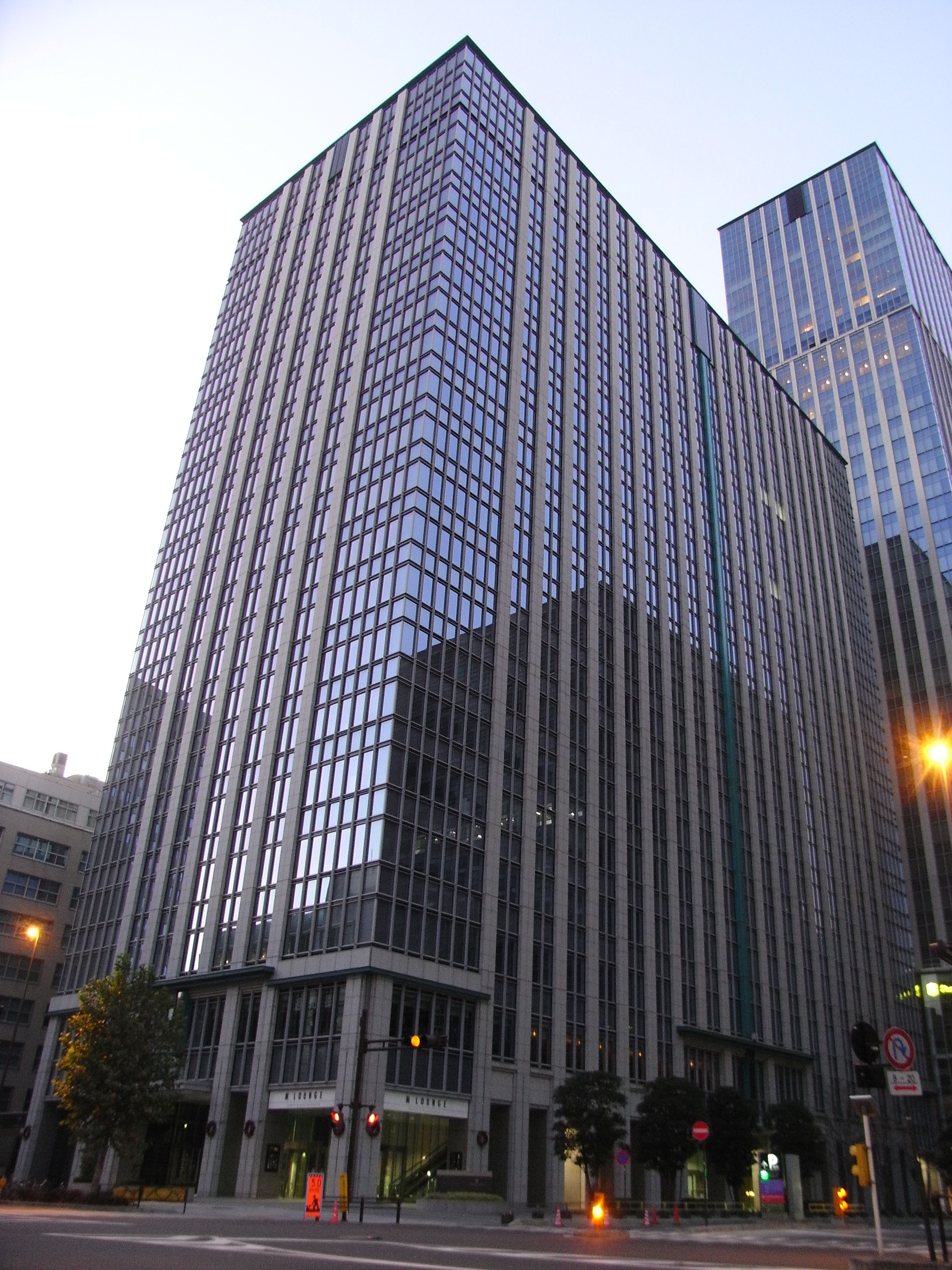
- Headquarters in Chiyoda, Tokyo
- Native name: JCOM株式会社
- Romanized name: Jeikomu kabushiki-gaisha
- Formerly: Jupiter Telecommunications Co., Ltd. (1995-2021)
- Type: Private
- Traded as: TYO: 4817
- Industry: Telecommunications; Mass media
- Headquarters: Marunouchi, Chiyoda, Tokyo, Japan
- Owner: KDDI (50%); Sumitomo Corporation (50%)
- Subsidiaries: Asmik Ace; J:COM BS; J:COM Marketing; J Sports; Jupiter Golf Network; Skydance Japan (minority stake)
- Website: jcom.co.jp; jcom.co.jp/corporate

JCOM Co., Ltd. is a Japanese company headquartered in Chiyoda, Tokyo, whose main operation is an MSO (multiple-system) cable operator in Sapporo, Sendai, Tokyo, Osaka and Fukuoka. It is a consolidated subsidiary of KDDI, and is a 50/50 joint venture with Sumitomo Corporation.

Previously known as Jupiter Communications, the company uses the brand name J:COM, and many of its subsidiaries have the J:COM name.

== History ==
The company was created in December 1994 by Tele-Communications Inc., one of the largest MSOs in the world at the time. The company would initially offer cable systems and would later branch out to telephone services. The company expected to set up its telephony services by mid-1996, as well as trialing interactive television services. TCI, on its behalf, had problems with Japanese bureaucracy, as well as problems faced by smaller cable companies to provide digital services even after deregulation in 1993, enabling more foreign control. In 1999, it signed an agreement with @Home Internet to provide internet services for its subscribers.

Liberty Global sold its stake to KDDI in January 2010.

On December 1, 2023, it added Paramount+ to its services, alongside WOWOW. In June 2025, it took over satellite channel BS Shochiku Tokyu, saving it from closure, and renaming it J:COM BS.

== J:COM Channel ==
J:COM Channel is the name given to its community channels. A second channel, J:COM TV, started broadcasting in June 2011.
