= Kousoku Sentai Turboranger =

Television series

- Title screen
- Genre: Tokusatsu; Superhero fiction Science fantasy Action/Adventure
- Created by: Toei Company
- Developed by: Hirohisa Soda
- Directed by: Shohei Tojo; Takao Nagaishi; Kiyoshi Arai; Masao Minowa
- Starring: Kenta Sato; Yoshiaki Ganaha; Keiya Asakura; Junichiro Katagiri; Noriko Kinohara; Fujita Okamoto; Mayumi Omuta; Kanako Kishi; Yoshinori Tanaka; Masako Morishita
- Narrated by: Nobuo Tanaka
- Composer: Akihiko Yoshida
- Country of origin: Japan
- No. of episodes: 51

Production
- Producers: Takeyuki Suzuki; Kyōzō Utsunomiya
- Running time: 30 minutes
- Production companies: TV Asahi; Toei Company; Toei Agency

Original release
- Network: ANN (TV Asahi)
- Release: February 25, 1989 – February 23, 1990

Related
- Choujyu Sentai Liveman; Chikyu Sentai Fiveman

Kousoku Sentai Turboranger (高速戦隊ターボレンジャー, Kōsoku Sentai Tāborenjā; English title: Turbo Rangers) is a Japanese television tokusatsu series broadcast by TV Asahi. The series is the 13th installment of Super Sentai. Directed by Shohei Tojo, Takao Nagaishi, Kiyoshi Arai and Masao Minowa. It stars Kenta Sato, Yoshiaki Ganaha, Keiya Asakura, Junichiro Katagiri, Noriko Kinohara, Fujita Okamoto, Mayumi Omuta, Kanako Kishi, Yoshinori Tanaka and Masako Morishita. It aired from February 25, 1989 to February 23, 1990, replacing Choujyu Sentai Liveman and was replaced by Chikyu Sentai Fiveman. Turboranger was also the first Super Sentai series to air on Friday instead of Saturday.

During its initial run, Turboranger was the 11th Super Sentai and billed as the tenth-anniversary title of the Super Sentai series (as Battle Fever J was designated as the first Super Sentai series from 1988 to 1994 after the exclusion of Himitsu Sentai Gorenger and J.A.K.Q. Dengekitai due to rights issues with Shotaro Ishinomori). However, in 1995, Gorenger and J.A.K.Q. were included into the Super Sentai series once more, thus making Turboranger the 13th in the franchise.

== Plot ==
20,000 years ago, the Fairy race assisted humans in a battle against the Hundred Bohma Tribes, successfully sealing them away. However, due to modern-day pollution and humanity's destruction of nature, the power of the Fairy magic has weakened, allowing the seal to be broken and thus the Bohma Tribes to escape. With the help of Dr. Dazai; Seelon, the last of the fairies, summons five high school seniors. As children, they were showered with the "flames of spirit" of the fallen fairies in a forest and can now hear Seelon's voice. Donning powered suits, the product of a collaboration between Seelon's magic and Dr. Dazai's science, the five become the Turborangers, juggling days of fighting with their regular school lives, in order to defeat the Bohma Tribe.

== Characters ==
=== Turborangers ===
The eponymous Turborangers are high school students of Musashino Academy. (Note: The sixth ranger of Mashin Sentai Kiramager, Takamichi Crystaria is revealed to have had attended the same school as the Turborangers in episode 16, confirmed by Kenta Sato.)

- Riki Honoo (炎 力, Honō Riki)/Red Turbo (レッドターボ, Reddo Tābo): A brave high school baseball team captain. An ace pitcher, his technique is the "Demonball of Fire/Honoo" and he dreams of becoming a professional. Riki has a high sense of justice and confidence, but is hyperactive and performs poorly at school. After the series ended, Riki had a cameo appearance on Kaizoku Sentai Gokaiger to grant the Greater Power of the Turborangers to the Gokaigers.
- Daichi Yamagata (山形 大地, Yamagata Daichi)/Black Turbo (ブラックターボ, Burakku Tābo): A patient track star who is also a good student giving him the fame of "Running Brain". He cares for his team and is self-sacrificing.
- Yohei Hama (浜 洋平, Hama Yōhei)/Blue Turbo (ブルーターボ, Burū Tābo): A swimmer and high diver. He often harasses girls and has serious misbehavior problems.
- Shunsuke Hino (日野 俊介, Hino Shunsuke)/Yellow Turbo (イエローターボ, Ierō Tābo): He is a gymnast. He was in love with a girl he knew as "Sayo-chan" when younger, who was actually Kirika, a human-Bohma hybrid. He has a younger brother named Shunji who was killed in a hit and run.
- Haruna Morikawa (森川 はるな, Morikawa Haruna)/Pink Turbo (ピンクターボ, Pinku Tābo): A student council president & star student, being popular among and admired by her peers.

==== Allies ====
- Dr. Dazai (太宰博士, Dazai-hakase): A scientist who was contacted by Seelon and helped create the Turborangers' mecha. He is a car enthusiast and based the mecha and suits on vehicles. He is slightly eccentric and has a crush on Yamaguchi, the Turborangers' teacher.
- Fairy Seelon (妖精シーロン, Yōsei Shīron): The last surviving Fairy, standing 8 centimeters (3.15 inches) tall. She is only visible to the Turborangers, or through goggles Dazai invented. She and Dr. Dazai work together to stop the Tribes and she lives in a doll house modified by the doctor. She can emit a "Shine of the Soul" that temporarily disorients enemies, but can be fatal to her.
- Sacred Beast Lakia (聖獣ラキア, Seijū Rakia): A white-maned, winged holy beast defender of Earth, the keeper of peace, and guardian of fairies. He fought the Bohma long ago and sealed many of them, sealing himself near Bohma Castle. However, the pollution of the Earth gravely weakened Lakia, forcing him to negate the seal on Bohma Castle. He tasked the Turborangers with restoring peace to the Earth before dying and becoming a constellation to watch over them.
- Misa Yamaguchi (山口 美佐, Yamaguchi Misa): A math teacher and the Turborangers' homeroom teacher. Yamaguchi is gentle and well-liked, though disapproves when the Turborangers shirk classes and extracurricular activities to fight, not knowing why they are absent. She believes Dr. Dazai is a bad influence on the kids. She is a fan of sumo wrestling. She has a younger sister named Mika who studies martial arts. She finds out the five's secret lives as Turborangers in the finale, boarding the Turbo Base to give them words of inspiration.
- Yumi Sakakibara (榊原 由美, Sakakibara Yumi): Classmate of Shunsuke Hino/Yellow Turbo. She is the first ordinary human to break the seal of the Bohma Beast. It is heavily implied that she has feelings for Shunsuke which he reciprocates.
- Mika Yamaguchi (山口 美香, Yamaguchi Mika): Little sister of Misa, appearing in episode 36. She loves her sister and dislikes for making Misa worry so often. She finds out the Turborangers' true identities, and decides to keep their secret, befriending them.

=== Hundred Bohma Tribes ===
The Hundred Bohma Tribes (暴魔百族, Bōma Hyakuzoku) (Note: Bōma (暴魔) is literally translated as "Violent Demon".) are a race of demons who were sealed away by a human-Fairy coalition 20,000 years ago. However, due to pollution weakening the Fairy magic that sealed them, the Bohma are free to take their revenge on humanity from Bohma Castle (暴魔城, Bōma-jō) as their base of operations. In the finale, Bohma Castle is destroyed by Super Turbo Builder.

- Great Bohma Emperor Lagorn (大暴魔帝王ラゴーン, Daibōma Teiō Ragōn): The partially petrified dictator of the Bohma. He can only move his head, arms, and tentacles, remaining on his throne. He is merciless and cruel, often punishing subordinates with his tentacles for failing him. He becomes mobile after retrieving the monster-enlarging orb, growing giant. He was "destroyed" by Super Turbo Builder, but later revives himself by consuming energies of hatred and sadness, and becoming the gold-skinned and mobile snake/dinosaur-like Neo-Lagorn (ネオラゴーン, Neo Ragōn). He faces the Turborangers as a giant in the finale in which he is destroyed for good by the Super Turbo Robo.
- Bohma Doctor Lehda (暴魔博士レーダ, Bōma Hakase Rēda): A bearded mystic genius, powerful sorcerer, and Ragorn's second-in-command. He has an ammonite-like head, human face, and a cloak that covers his seahorse-like body. Intelligent and cruel, he hates humanity and his schemes pit humans against each other. He is a negligent field commander but is favored by Lagorn, working closely with him and being entrusted with the most dangerous operations.
- Dark Bohma Zimba (暗闇暴魔ジンバ, Kurayami Bōma Jinba): A samurai-like keikō-wearing masked Haniwa-themed warrior in black armor, expert in all martial arts with a mastery of swords. He is a sadistic madman, taking pleasure in human suffering, especially when it comes to love because he was rejected in his past life as a human. He loves Jarmin but denies it at times.
- Bohma Princess Jarmin (暴魔姫ジャーミン, Bōma Hime Jāmin): A cold-hearted magician whose face becomes serpentine when angered, and uses a whip in battle. She is deceptive and attacks humans out of envy and spite.
- Rage Flying Bohma Zulten (かっとび暴魔ズルテン, Kattobi Bōma Zuruten): A fat, disgusting creature able to turn into an all-terrain vehicle for Jarmin. He is armed with a slingshot and is a cheat and weak willed, always sucking up to superiors.
- Ular Soldiers (ウーラー兵, Ūrā-hei): (Note: Also spelt as Ura.) The long-haired Cyclops foot soldiers under Lagorn's services, the black-skinned Ular are a Bohma Tribe and have the ability to merge into ball-shaped Ular Dumplings. They were originally led by Ular Bohma (ウーラーボーマ, Ūrā Bōma), the Ular Clan's leader and greatest warrior who was sealed away. Once unsealed by Rehda with the Ular's prayers, Ular Bohma finds the Ular Road, which Japan National Route 44 was built on, and released the vast army of Ular sealed there. Then, to show his kind's unwavering loyalty to Lagorn, Ular Bohma has some of his Ular sacrifice themselves to invoke an earthquake to wipe out the human population. However, the Turborangers stop the scheme and the enlarged Ular Bohma was destroyed by the Turbo Robo's Turbo Cannon. The Ulars since vowed to kill the Turborangers to avenge their fallen leader. The Ulars are usually led into battle by the red-skinned Ular Captain Wu (ウーラー隊長ウー, Ūrā Taichō Ū) and Ular Captain Lar (ウーラー隊長ラー, Ūrā Taichō Rā), but they no longer show up later on.

==== Wandering Bohma ====
The Wandering Bohma (流れ暴魔, Nagare Bōma) are Yōkai, the offspring of humans and demons.

- Yamimaru (ヤミマル): A Tsuchigumo-themed Wandering Bohma who was refused from being a member of the 100 Violent Demon Tribes. Because he was half-demon, he was not sealed and simply wandered Earth for 20,000 years to obtain as much knowledge as he could, never being accepted by humans. In modern times, he assumed the guise of Hikaru Nagareboshi (流星光, Nagareboshi Hikaru) and transferred to the same school as the Turborangers. His goal is to destroy both humans and Bohma, leaving only the Wandering Bohma.
- Kirika (キリカ): She originally lived as a normal girl named Sayoko Tsukikage (月影小夜子, Tsukikage Sayoko) until she learned that she is a Wandering Bohma on her 18th birthday, after finding that the man and woman who raised (and protected her for 20,000 years) were really Skull Monsters. As Tsukikage, was an outcast in school who secretly loved Riki. She is permanently connected to Yamimaru through the "red thread of fate." Cruel and lacking compassion, she resentments humans for bullying her. Near the final, she meets her true father, a peaceful demon named Kashim (カシム, Kashimu), who tells her how much he loved her human mother, and how they both wanted humans and Bohma to coexist. In the finale, she saves Yamimaru and leaves to live a peaceful life with him.

==== Bohma Beasts ====
The Bohma Beasts (暴魔獣, Bōmajū) are a multitude of monsters that share the same demonic genetics and work for the Hundred Bohma Tribes where they were first seen 2,000 years ago during the Hundred Bohma Tribes' war with the humans and the fairies and sealed away. To make a Bohma Beast grow, one of Great Bohma Emperor Ragorn's minions will summon a tornado-like vortex while also causing them to make kaiju-like sounds.

- Stone Bohma (イワガミボーマ, Iwagami Bōma): A stone-themed Bohma Beast that was the first to be awoken from its imprisonment and freed its masters from their seals.
- Twisted Bohma (ネジクレボーマ, Nejikure Bōma): A centipede-themed Bohma Beast who was released from his seal in a forested area.
- Dango Bohma (ダンゴボーマ, Dango Bōma): A pillbug/dango-themed Bohma Beast who was released from his seal beneath a city street.
- Evil God Bohma (ジャシンボーマ, Jashin Bōma): A dragon/tree-themed Bohma Beast that appeared in Kousoku Sentai Turboranger: The Movie.
- Evil God Bohma Junior (ジャシンボーマJr, Jashin Bōma Juniā): A tree-themed Bohma Beast and the son of Evil God Bohma that appeared in Kousoku Sentai Turboranger: The Movie.
- Minokasa Bohma (ミノカサボーマ, Minokasa Bōma): A Bohma Beast that was released from a seal that was over a minokasa outfit by Bohma Princess Jarmin.
- Licking Bohma (ペロペロボーマ, Peropero Bōma): A face-themed Bohma Beast that was released from a seal in a sealed casket within a polluted lake by Bohma Doctor Lehda.
  - Bohma Zombies (暴魔ゾンビ, Bōma Zonbi): A bunch of Bohma zombies created by Licking Bohma from the pollution in the lake that it was sealed in.
- Great Jaw Bohma (アギトボーマ, Agito Bōma): A crocodile-themed Bohma Beast that was released from a seal within a shrine beneath a cherry tree by Dark Bohma Zimba who raised it. Its because of its weakness to cherry blossoms that it was sealed in the shrine.
- Mansion Bohma (ヤシキボーマ, Yashiki Bōma): A mansion-themed Bohma Beast that was sealed in a cave beneath a certain house in Habarizaki Hill under a certain house and was used by Bohma Princess Jarmin upon its release.
- Possession Bohma (トリツキボーマ, Toritsuki Bōma): A moth-themed Bohma Beast that was released from a seal in a statue and was used by Rage Flying Bohma Zulten.
- Oni Bohma (オニボーマ, Oni Bōma): An Oni/crab-themed Bohma Beast who was released from a seal in a samurai doll by Dark Bohma Zimba.
- Ular Bohma (ウーラーボーマ, Ūrā Bōma): A Bohma Beast who is the true leader of the Ular Soldiers and was released from his seal by Bohma Doctor Lehda. When Ular Bohma was destroyed by the Turborangers, the Ular Soldiers mourned its death and swore revenge on the Turborangers.
- Ruffian Bohma (アラクレボーマ, Arakure Bōma): A Bohma Beast that was spared by Saint Beast Lakia 2,000 years ago and was sealed in a Bohma Nail that was placed in a red pool beneath Bohma Castle. Rage Flying Bohma Zulten lied to Ruffian Bohma upon releasing him by stating that the Turborangers are the enemies. As the Turborangers grant him a mercy killing in the Turbo Robo, he joins Saint Beast Lakia in the constellations.
- Sigh Bohma (タメイキボーマ, Tameiki Bōma): A witch-themed Bohma Beast used by Bohma Princess Jarmin.
- Dogu Bohma (ドグウボーマ, Dogū Bōma): A Dogū-themed Bohma Beast that was released from its seal at a construction site near some ancient Japanese ruins by Bohma Princess Jarmin and later used by Yamimaru.
- Darumatoshi Bohma (ダルマオトシボーマ, Darumaotoshi Bōma): A daruma doll-themed Bohma Beast summoned by Yamimaru.
- Lump Bohma (コブボーマ, Kobu Bōma): An lump-themed Bohma Beast summoned by Yamimaru.
- Muddled Bohma (ドロロボーマ, Dororo Bōma): A Ganguro-themed Bohma Beast that was released from its seal in a stone tomb by Rage Flying Bohma Zulten.
- Fossil Bohma (カセキボーマ, Kaseki Bōma): A Triceratops fossil-themed Bohma Beast with a Velociraptor skull for a right hand who was sealed behind a wall of fossils by Great Bohma Emperor Ragorn 21,000 years ago after eating the golden apples that made it stronger. It was released from its seal behind a wall of fossils by Yamimaru.
- Heinous Bohma (ゴクアクボーマ, Gokuaku Bōma): A Bohma Beast who is the combine form of two Bohma Beast brothers Hyoma (氷魔, Hyōma) and Enma (炎魔, Enma). Hyoma is an ice-themed Bohma Beast and the eldest of the Bohma Beast Brothers while Enma is a fire-themed Bohma Beast and the youngest of the Bohma Beast brothers. They fought in the war 2,000 years later where Hyoma became disillusioned after Enma was wounded. In the present, Hyoma and Enma were released from their seal in two demon statues by Bohma Princess Jarmin. The two meet Shunsuke with Hyoma coming to care for the Turboranger as another brother, connecting over their shared responsibilities as older brothers. After Hyoma was injured while trying to save Enma from Jarmin, they work to save each other by fusing into Heinous Bohma rendering them mindless. After Turbo Robo defeats Heinous Bohma, it splits back into Hyoma and Enma as they die together and are reborn as a blue and red flower; with the possibility of them regaining their true forms again once they regain the strength to.
- Poison Bohma (モードクボーマ, Mōdoku Bōma): A scorpion-themed Bohma used by Rage Flying Bohma Zulten.
- Sumo Bohma (スモウボーマ, Sumō Bōma): A sumo-themed Bohma that fought in the war 20,000 where he was only interested in having a sumo match with humans. He was released from its seal in a temple that is blessed with salt for sumo tournaments by Rage Flying Bohma Zulten. He ends up becoming close with Daichi, taking him on as a Sumo apprentice; forming a father-and-son bond with the second-in-command of the Turborangers.
- Racer Bohma (レーサーボーマ, Rēsā Bōma): A Bohma Beast with a personal vehicle who was released from its seal in a painting of a Bohma Beast riding a chariot by Bohma Doctor Lehda.
- Ghost Bohma (ユウレイボーマ, Yūrei Bōma): A ghost-themed Bohma Beast who was released from its seal in a haunted tree by Rage Flying Beast Zulten.
- Palm Tree Bohma (ヤシノミボーマ, Yashinomi Bōma): A palm tree-themed Bohma Beast who was released from its seal from a coconut on a South Sea island by Bohma Doctor Lehda and planned to release the rest of his clan from their seals.
- Inugami Bohma (イヌガミボーマ, Inugami Bōma): An Inugami-themed Bohma Beast summoned by Dark Bohma Zimba.
- Immortality Bohma (フジミボーマ, Fujimi Bōma): A shellfish/crustacean-themed Bohma Beast who hatches and fights alongside Dark Bohma Zimba.
- Bell Chime Bohma (スズナリボーマ, Suzunari Bōma): A bell chime/Buddha statue-themed Bohma Beast that was released from its seal in a statue by Bohma Princess Jarmin. Met and slowly fell in love with Yohei when the Ranger offered to help her sealed fellows.
- Koroko Bohma (クロコボーマ, Kuroko Bōma): A Kuroko/snake-themed Bohma Beast who was released from Bohma Princess Jarmin.
- Super-Majin Bohma (超魔神ボーマ, Chōmajin Bōma): The Guardian God of the Hundred Bohma Tribes who was summoned by Bohma Doctor Lehda.
- Amulet Bohma (オマモリボーマ, Omamori Bōma): A moth larva-themed Bohma Beast who was one of Kirika's guardians.
- Mirror Bohma (カガミボーマ, Kagami Bōma): A mirror-themed Bohma Beast who was one of Kirika's guardians.
- Noppera Bohma (ノッペラボーマ, Noppera Bōma): A face-switching Noppera-bō-themed Bohma Beast used by Kirika.
- Grueling Bohma (シゴキボーマ, Shigoki Bōma): A Bohma Beast used by Yamimaru whose whips can control anything.
- Reaper Bohma (シニガミボーマ, Shinigami Bōma): A Grim Reaper-themed Bohma Beast used by Kirika. It was able to use its ability to revive Possession Bohma, Dogu Bohma, Darumaotoshi Bohma, Poison Bohma, and Immortality Bohma.
- Memory Bohma (キオクボーマ, Kioku Bōma): An Itako-themed Bohma Beast used by Yamimaru.
- Hell Painting Bohma (ジゴクエボーマ, Jigokue Bōma): A Bohma Beast loyal to Great Bohma Emperor Lagorn who was accidentally released from its seal in a painting that was located in Mushashino Academy's storage room.
- Picture Book Bohma (エホンボーマ, Ehon Bōma): A picture book-themed Bohma Beast used by Yamimaru.
- Actor Bohma (オヤクシャボーマ, Oyakusha Bōma): A Kabuki-themed Bohma Beast residing on Shikoku while posing as unspecified migratory bird-themed Bohma Beast Migratory Bird Bohma (ワタリドリボーマ, Watari Dori Bōma).
- Devil Bohma (デビルボーマ, Debiru Bōma): A devil-themed Bohma Beast used by Yamimaru.
- Gunman Bohma (ガンマンボーマ, Ganman Bōma): A gunfighter-themed Bohma Beast used by Rage Bohma Beast Zulten who is stated to be the best assassin of the Bohma Tribes.
- Armor Bohma (ヨロイボーマ, Yoroi Bōma): A chameleon/meteorite-themed Bohma Beast targeted by Kirika at the suggestion of Amulet Bohma's ghost in order to become a full Bohma.
- Seal Bohma (ハンコボーマ, Hanko Bōma): A seal-stamping elephant/turbo sazae-themed Bohma Beast used by Kirika.
- One-Eyed Bohma (ヒトツメボーマ, Hitotsume Bōma): A one-eyed monk-themed Bohma Beast used to revive Great Bohma Emperor Lagorn.
- Masked Devil Bohma (キメンボーマ, Kimen Bōma): An Ainu man/devil-themed Bohma Beast who is the father of Kirika.
- Dragra Bohma (ドラグラボーマ, Doragura Bōma): A dragon/bat-themed Bohma Beast released from Bat Beast Dragras used by Neo-Lagorn.
- Gum-Gum Bohma (ゴムゴムボーマ, Gomugomu Bōma): A parasite/graffiti-themed Bohma Beast created by Neo-Lagorn.
- Dark Spider Bohma (ヤミクモボーマ, Yamikumo Bōma): A spider-themed Bohma Beast created by Yamimaru and Kirika from Yamimaru's pet spider Dark Spider (ヤミクモボーマ, Yamikumo).
- Sealing Bohma (フーインボーマ, Fūin Bōma): A dragon/lock-themed Bohma Beast released from underground by Neo-Lagorn.

== Episodes ==
The first episode of the series was actually a special to commemorate what was at the time the tenth anniversary of Super Sentai since Battle Fever J. On October 6, 1989 (the day that episode 32 aired), the show began to be broadcast later on Fridays instead of Saturdays. A movie was released at the Toei Manga Festival on March 18, 1989, which was the same day episode 4 aired.

No.	Title	Directed by	Written by	Original air date
1	"The 10 Great Sentai Gathering! Counting On You! Turboranger"; Transliteration: "Jū Dai Sentai Shūgō! Tanomu Zo! Tāborenjā" (Japanese: 10大戦隊集合! 頼むぞ! ターボレンジャー)	Shohei Tojo	Takeyuki Suzuki, Yoshihiro Kobayashi	February 25, 1989
2	"Did You Guys See a Fairy!?"; Transliteration: "Kimitachi wa Yōsei o mita ka!" (Japanese: 君達は妖精を見たか!)	Takao Nagaishi	Hirohisa Soda	March 4, 1989^{1}
3	"Bohma Castle! The 20,000-Year Curse"; Transliteration: "Bōma Jō! Niman-nen no Noroi" (Japanese: 暴魔城! 二万年の呪い)	Takao Nagaishi	Hirohisa Soda	March 11, 1989
4	"The Rumbling Human Dango!"; Transliteration: "Gorogoro Ningen Dango!" (Japanese: ゴロゴロ人間ダンゴ!)	Shohei Tojo	Hirohisa Soda	March 18, 1989
5	"Escape! The Samurai Town"; Transliteration: "Dasshutsu da! Samurai no Machi" (Japanese: 脱出だ! サムライの町)	Shohei Tojo	Hirohisa Soda	March 25, 1989
6	"Slimy! Bohma Zombie"; Transliteration: "Nururu! Bōma Zonbi" (Japanese: ヌルルッ! 暴魔ゾンビ)	Kiyoshi Arai	Hirohisa Soda	April 1, 1989
7	"The Lover-Eating Bohma Beast!"; Transliteration: "Koibito o Taberu Bōma Jū!" (Japanese: 恋人を食べる暴魔獣!)	Kiyoshi Arai	Kunio Fujii	April 8, 1989
8	"Jarmin's House That Flies in the Sky"; Transliteration: "Sora Tobu Jāmin no Uchi" (Japanese: 空飛ぶジャーミンの家)	Takao Nagaishi	Hirohisa Soda	April 15, 1989
9	"Yearning for a Demonic Flute"; Transliteration: "Akogare wa Akuma no Furūto" (Japanese: 憧れは悪魔のフルート)	Takao Nagaishi	Kunio Fujii	April 22, 1989
10	"The Boys' Day Doll That Calls Oni"; Transliteration: "Oni o Yobu Gogatsu Ningyō" (Japanese: 鬼を呼ぶ五月人形)	Shohei Tojo	Kunio Fujii	April 29, 1989
11	"Roar! Ular Highway!"; Transliteration: "Bakusō! Ūrā Kaidō!" (Japanese: 爆走! ウーラー街道!)	Shohei Tojo	Hirohisa Soda	May 6, 1989
12	"The Bohma Beast That Became a Star!"; Transliteration: "Hoshi ni Natta Bōma Jū!" (Japanese: 星になった暴魔獣!)	Kiyoshi Arai	Kunio Fujii	May 13, 1989
13	"Activate the Witch's Trap!"; Transliteration: "Majo ni Wana o Kakero!" (Japanese: 魔女にワナをかけろ!)	Kiyoshi Arai	Kunio Fujii	May 20, 1989
14	"He's Here! The Wandering Exchange Student"; Transliteration: "Sanjō! Sasurai Tenkōsei" (Japanese: 参上! さすらい転校生)	Takao Nagaishi	Hirohisa Soda	May 27, 1989
15	"Dark Round! Certain-Death Alignment"; Transliteration: "Yamimaru! Hissatsu no Shōjun" (Japanese: ヤミマル! 必殺の照準)	Takao Nagaishi	Hirohisa Soda	June 3, 1989
16	"Fire the V-Turbo Bazooka"; Transliteration: "Ute Bui Tābo Bazūka" (Japanese: 射てVターボバズーカ)	Shohei Tojo	Hirohisa Soda	June 10, 1989
17	"The Teacher Who Became a Child"; Transliteration: "Kodomo ni Natta Sensei" (Japanese: 子供になった先生)	Shohei Tojo	Kunio Fujii	June 17, 1989
18	"5-Minute Transformation"; Transliteration: "Go-Funkan no Henshin" (Japanese: 5分間の変身)	Takao Nagaishi	Hirohisa Soda	June 24, 1989
19	"Clash! Demon Siblings"; Transliteration: "Gekitotsu! Ma Kyōdai" (Japanese: 激突! 魔兄弟)	Takao Nagaishi	Toshiki Inoue	July 1, 1989
20	"Bohma Tribe Haruna"; Transliteration: "Bōma Zoku Haruna" (Japanese: 暴魔族はるな)	Shohei Tojo	Toshiki Inoue	July 8, 1989
21	"Dosukoi Contest"; Transliteration: "Dosukoi Shōbu" (Japanese: ドスコイ勝負)	Shohei Tojo	Hirohisa Soda	July 15, 1989
22	"Youth Road!"; Transliteration: "Seishun Rōdo!" (Japanese: 青春ロード!)	Takao Nagaishi	Hirohisa Soda	July 22, 1989
23	"A Lot of Ghosts"; Transliteration: "Yūrei Ippai" (Japanese: 幽霊いっぱい)	Takao Nagaishi	Kunio Fujii	July 29, 1989
24	"Dreadful! Summer Sea"; Transliteration: "Kowai! Natsu no Umi" (Japanese: 怖い! 夏の海)	Kiyoshi Arai	Hirohisa Soda	August 5, 1989
25	"The Fighting Puppy"; Transliteration: "Tatakau Koinu" (Japanese: 戦う子犬)	Kiyoshi Arai	Hirohisa Soda	August 12, 1989
26	"Riki! Desperate Situation"; Transliteration: "Riki! Zettai Zetsumei" (Japanese: 力! 絶体絶命)	Shohei Tojo	Toshiki Inoue	August 19, 1989
27	"Girl Bohma Rin"; Transliteration: "Shōjo Bōma Rin" (Japanese: 少女暴魔リン)	Shohei Tojo	Mami Watanabe	August 26, 1989
28	"Robo Combination Failure"; Transliteration: "Robo Gattai Funō" (Japanese: ロボ合体不能)	Takao Nagaishi	Hirohisa Soda	September 2, 1989
29	"Hurry! New Model Robo"; Transliteration: "Kyōge Shin Daka Robo" (Japanese: 急げ新型ロボ)	Takao Nagaishi	Hirohisa Soda	September 9, 1989
30	"The End of Lehda"; Transliteration: "Rēda no Saigo" (Japanese: レーダの最後)	Shohei Tojo	Hirohisa Soda	September 23, 1989
31	"Woman Warrior Kirika"; Transliteration: "Onna Senshi Kirika" (Japanese: 女戦士キリカ)	Shohei Tojo	Hirohisa Soda	September 30, 1989
32	"The Big Demonic Mystery Bird!"; Transliteration: "Akuma no Dai Kaicho!" (Japanese: 悪魔の大怪鳥!)	Takao Nagaishi	Hirohisa Soda	October 6, 1989
33	"Steal! Yōhei's Face"; Transliteration: "Ubae! Yōhei no Kao" (Japanese: 奪え! 洋平の顔)	Takao Nagaishi	Hirohisa Soda	October 13, 1989
34	"Zulten's Sneaky Trick"; Transliteration: "Zuruten no Urawaza" (Japanese: ズルテンの裏技)	Shohei Tojo	Hirohisa Soda	October 20, 1989
35	"The Majin Sword That Calls Love"; Transliteration: "Ai o Yobu Majin Ken" (Japanese: 愛を呼ぶ魔神剣)	Shohei Tojo	Toshiki Inoue	October 27, 1989
36	"Memories of Destiny..."; Transliteration: "Unmei no Omoide..." (Japanese: 運命の想い出…)	Takao Nagaishi	Kunio Fujii	November 3, 1989
37	"Mysterious Kung Fu Girl"; Transliteration: "Kan Fū Nazo Shōjo" (Japanese: カンフー謎少女)	Takao Nagaishi	Hirohisa Soda	November 10, 1989
38	"The Painting of Hell That Devours People"; Transliteration: "Hito o Kuu Jigokue" (Japanese: 人を喰う地獄絵)	Masao Minowa	Mami Watanabe	November 17, 1989
39	"The End of Ragorn"; Transliteration: "Ragōn no Saigo" (Japanese: ラゴーンの最後)	Masao Minowa	Hirohisa Soda	November 24, 1989
40	"Walk! Child of Shikoku"; Transliteration: "Aruke! Shikoku no Ko" (Japanese: 歩け! 四国の子)	Shohei Tojo	Hirohisa Soda	December 1, 1989
41	"The Star Is Me!"; Transliteration: "Sutā wa Ore da!" (Japanese: スターは俺だ!)	Shohei Tojo	Hirohisa Soda	December 8, 1989
42	"Scary Birthday!"; Transliteration: "Kowai Tanjōbi!" (Japanese: コワイ誕生日!)	Takao Nagaishi	Kunio Fujii	December 15, 1989
43	"The Sixth Warrior!"; Transliteration: "Rokunin-me no Senshi!" (Japanese: 6人目の戦士!)	Takao Nagaishi	Toshiki Inoue	December 22, 1989
44	"Wandering Bohma Legend"; Transliteration: "Nagare Bōma Densetsu" (Japanese: 流れ暴魔伝説)	Masao Minowa	Mami Watanabe	January 5, 1990
45	"Super Magic Boy"; Transliteration: "Chō Majikku Shōnen" (Japanese: 超マジック少年)	Masao Minowa	Hirohisa Soda	January 12, 1990
46	"Ragorn's Counterattack"; Transliteration: "Ragōn no Gyakushū" (Japanese: ラゴーンの逆襲)	Takao Nagaishi	Hirohisa Soda	January 19, 1990
47	"SOS Transformation Failure"; Transliteration: "Esu Ō Esu Henshin Funō" (Japanese: SOS変身不能)	Takao Nagaishi	Hirohisa Soda	January 26, 1990
48	"The Wandering Bohma's Secret"; Transliteration: "Nagare Bōma no Himitsu" (Japanese: 流れ暴魔の秘密)	Takao Nagaishi	Hirohisa Soda	February 2, 1990
49	"Beautiful Kirika"; Transliteration: "Utsukushiki Kirika" (Japanese: 美しきキリカ)	Masao Minowa	Hirohisa Soda	February 9, 1990
50	"The Dreadful Great Seal"; Transliteration: "Osorubeki Dai Fūin" (Japanese: 恐るべき大封印)	Masao Minowa	Hirohisa Soda	February 16, 1990
Final	"Graduation of Youth"; Transliteration: "Seishun no Sotsugyōshiki" (Japanese: 青春の卒業式)	Masao Minowa	Hirohisa Soda	February 23, 1990

^{1}The first episode of Turboranger was originally scheduled to premiere on February 25, 1989. However, due to the death of Hirohito on January 7, the finale of Liveman was postponed to February 18, thus moving the premiere of Turboranger to March 4.

== Cast ==
- Riki Honoo: Kenta Sato
- Daichi Yamagata: Yoshiaki Ganaha
- Yohei Hama: Keiya Asakura
- Shunsuke Hino: Junichiro Katagiri
- Haruna Morikawa: Yoshiko Kinohara
- Dr. Dazai: Fujita Okamoto
- Seelon: Mayumi Omura
- Rakia: Banjo Ginga
- Misa Yamaguchi: Kyoko Takami
- Ragorn: Takeshi Watabe
- Doctor Rehda: Masashi Ishibashi
- Princess Jarmin: Kanako Kishi
- Zimba: Seiichi Hirai
- Zulten: Hideyuki Umezu
- Hikaru Nagareboshi/Yamimaru: Yoshinori Tanaka
- Sayoko Tsukikage/Kirika: Masako Morishita

=== Guest stars ===
- Mika: Keiko Hayase (37)
- Yukari: Miho Tojo (35)
- Rin: Hiromi Yuhara (27)
- Yumi Sakakibara: Sayuri Uchida (9)

== Songs ==
Opening theme

- "Kousoku Sentai Turboranger"
  - Lyrics: Ikki Matsumoto (松本 一起, Matsumoto Ikki)
  - Composition: Yoshimasa Inoue (井上 ヨシマサ, Inoue Yoshimasa)
  - Arrangement Ryō Yonemitsu (米光 亮, Yonemitsu Ryō)
  - Artist: Kenta Sato (佐藤 健太, Satō Kenta)

Ending themes

- "Zigzag Seishun Road" (ジグザグ青春ロード, Jiguzagu Seishun Rōdo; "Zigzag Youth Road")
  - Lyrics: Ikki Matsumoto
  - Composition: Yoshimasa Inoue
  - Arrangement: Ryō Yonemitsu
  - Artist: Kenta Sato
- "Dance Tokimeku Kokoro" (DANCE ときめく心, Dansu Tokimeku Kokoro; "Dance, Beating Heart")
  - Lyrics: Ikki Matsumoto
  - Composition: Yoshimasa Inoue
  - Arrangement: Ryō Yonemitsu
  - Artist: Kenta Sato
