= Daimaou Kosaka =

Japanese comedian, entertainer and personality

- 古坂大魔王
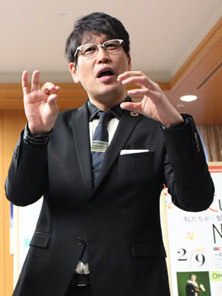
- Kosaka in 2019
- Born: Kazuhito Kosaka (古坂 和仁); 17 July 1973 (age 53); Aomori, Japan
- Other name: Pikotaro
- Education: Japan Institute of the Moving Image
- Occupations: Comedian, recording artist
- Years active: 1992–present
- Known for: "PPAP (Pen-Pineapple-Apple-Pen)"; Muryou Hatakaminami in Kiramager
- Spouse: Hitomi Yasueda (m. 2017)
- Children: 2

Notes
- Same year/generation as: Cream Stew

Kazuhito Kosaka (Japanese: 古坂和仁, Hepburn: Kosaka Kazuhito; born 17 July 1973), better known by his stage names Daimaou Kosaka (古坂大魔王, Kosaka Daimaō; lit: "Kosaka the Great Demon King") and Pikotaro (ピコ太郎, Pikotarō; stylized in all caps as PIKOTARO), is a Japanese comedian, television personality and entertainer. Kosaka introduced Pikotaro as another personality promoted by him, but they are considered the same person. He is currently signed with Avex Management Inc. under Avex Group.

He is best known for his single "PPAP (Pen-Pineapple-Apple-Pen)".

During US President Donald Trump's fall 2017 trip to Asia, Kosaka was chosen to sing at the official state reception, reportedly due to Japanese Prime Minister Shinzō Abe's wish to keep the mood "upbeat".

Kosaka is also known for portraying Muryou Hakataminami in Mashin Sentai Kiramager (2020–2021).

== Personal life ==
Daimaou Kosaka married Hitomi Yasueda, a gravure model, on 3 August 2017. On 17 June 2018, Yasueda gave birth to their first daughter and on 27 October 2020, their second.

== Discography ==
=== Albums ===
==== Studio albums ====
Most noteworthy studio album; selected chart positions and certifications:
Title	Album details	Peak chart positions		Certifications
Title	Album details	JPN	JPN Physical	Certifications
PPAP	Released: 7 December 2016; Label: Avex Trax; Formats: CD, digital download	5	3	

=== Singles ===
Most noteworthy single; year released, peak chart position, and album name:
Title	Year	Peak chart positions			Album
Title	Year	JPN	CAN	US	Album
"PPAP (Pen-Pineapple-Apple-Pen)"	2016	1	36	77	PPAP

==== Other singles ====
Other singles; years released, peak chart positions, and album names respectively:
Title	Year	Peak chart positions			Album
Title	Year	JPN	CAN	US	Album
"The Theme Song of Pikotaro"	2016	—	—	—	—N/a
"Romita Hashinikov"	2016	—	—	—	—N/a
"Kashite Kudasaiyo"	2016	—	—	—	—N/a
"Neo Sunglasses"	2016	—	—	—	—N/a
"PPAP vs. Axel F."	2016	—	—	—	—N/a
"I Like OJ"	2017	—	—	—	—N/a

== Filmography ==
Kosaka portrays Muruyo Hakataminami (the owner of Carat, mentor to the Kiramagers, and Younger Brother to Kiramei Silver) on Mashin Sentai Kiramager. His role as Pikotaro (most notably making PPAP) has been referenced many times, including (but not limited to):

- In the main base, a poster can be seen reading "Perfect Performance And Physical" in an Acrostic style.
- Episode 16's pre-credits scene has Juuru holding a pineapple and an apple while asking whether Mixelan (the new mecha, and a cement mixer) can mix fruit. Hakataminami is standing next to him the whole time.
- In the movie, he earnestly performs the song to wake the team up during a fight with a dream-themed monster.

Footage of Kosaka's Pineapple Pen song was utilized in The Emoji Movie.
