= Yoshiko Kinohara =

Japanese actress (born 1969)

Yoshiko Inuzuka (犬塚 賀子, Inuzuka Yoshiko, born January 20, 1969), known by her former stage name Yoshiko Kinohara (木之原 賀子, Kinohara Yoshiko), is a former Japanese actress known for her role as Haruna Morikawa in the TV series Kōsoku Sentai Turboranger. The thirteenth entry of Toei Company's Super Sentai series, the program aired on TV Asahi on March 3, 1989 to February 23, 1990 with a total of 50 episodes.

== Filmography ==
Year	Title	Role	Notes
1989-1990	Kousoku Sentai Turboranger	Haruna Morikawa / Pink Turbo	51 episodes
