= Hikaru Aoyama =

Japanese gravure idol and tarento (born 1993)

- 青山 ひかる
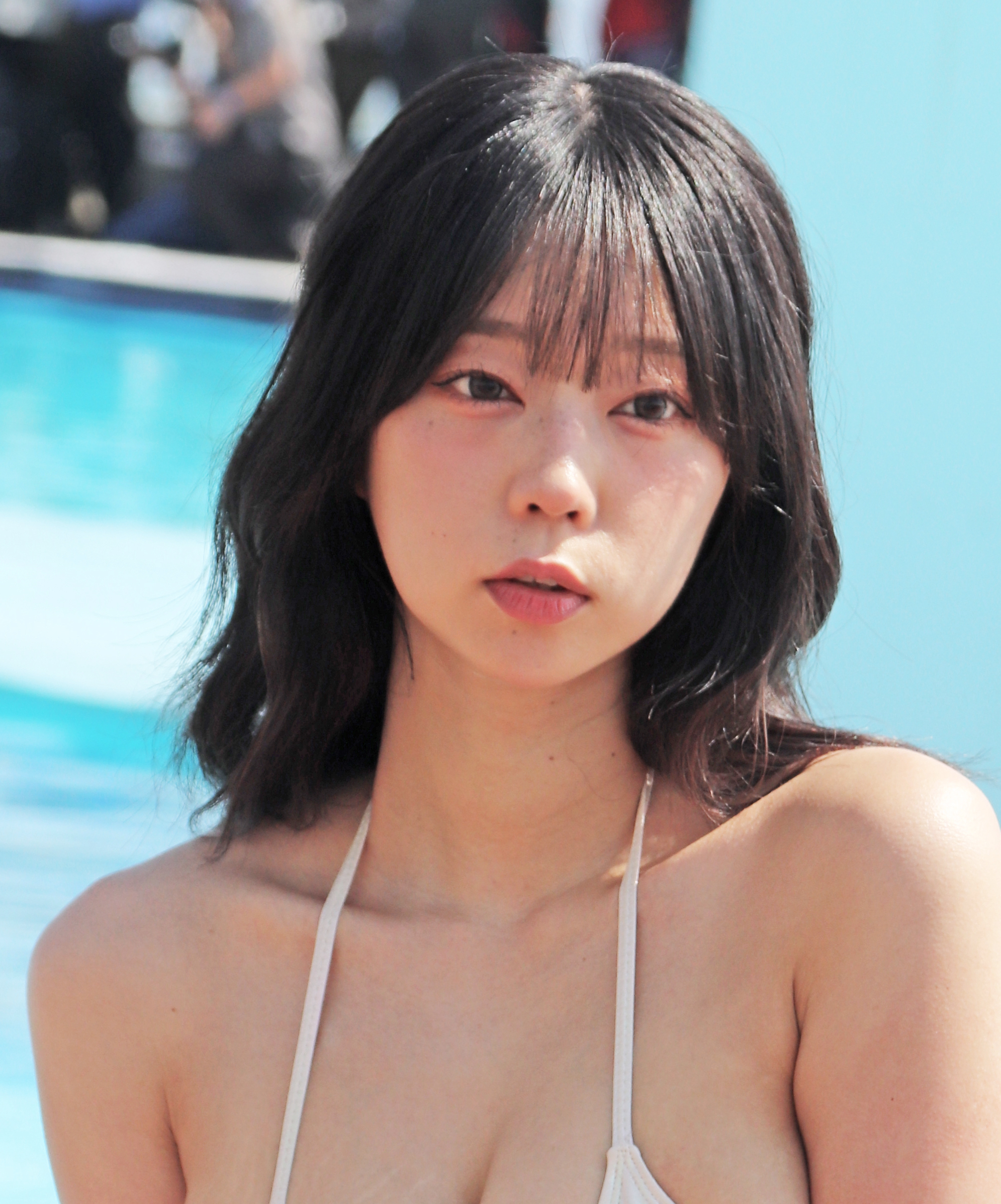
- Aoyama in 2025
- Born: 13 June 1993 (age 33); Sasebo, Nagasaki, Japan
- Other names: Aomin (あおみん); Wild Kitty Girl (野生児猫娘)
- Occupations: Gravure model; tarento
- Years active: 2013–present
- Agent: 01familia
- Style: Gravure

Hikaru Aoyama (青山 ひかる, Aoyama Hikaru; born June 13, 1993) is a Japanese gravure model and tarento. She is represented by the talent agency 01familia.

== Career ==
Aoyama debuted as a gravure idol in 2013. In April of the same year, she won the first "Jigadoru" Contest Grand Prix (Lily Franky Award) and in October, won the Nippon TV's "Shiodome Gravure Koshien 2014" Special Fan Award. She also won the Idol DVD Award as Selected by Professionals 2014.

In May 2015, she graduated from her gravure idol group of Sakuragaoka Chocolat and joined a new group called Sherbet in August of the same year.

In a 2016 collaboration, Aoyama modeled for the fashion brand Kiks Tyo on a series of six limited edition "Kiks Girls" photo t-shirts.

She left her former agency, Entermax Promotions, in 2017 and joined her current agency, 01familia. She continues her activities with appearances on magazine covers, often with other models of her agency. She was the lead actress in the Miss Machiko stage play adaptation.

She made an appearance in the video game Yakuza Kiwami 2 as a gravure idol, which was released in December 2017.
