= Mashin Sentai Kiramager =

Japanese television drama

- Genre: Tokusatsu; Superhero fiction Action; Fantasy; Supernatural; Comedy
- Created by: Saburo Yatsude
- Written by: Naruhisa Arakawa; Ayumi Shimo; Kaori Kaneko; Riku Sanjo; Tete Inoue; Michiko Yokote; Tomihiko Tokunaga
- Directed by: Kyohei Yamaguchi; Koichi Sakamoto; Katsuya Watanabe; Hiroyuki Kato; Kiyotaka Taguchi; Ryuta Tasaki; Noboru Takemoto; Koichiro Hayama
- Starring: Rio Komiya; Rui Kihara; Yume Shinjo; Atomu Mizuishi; Mio Kudo; Kohei Shoji; Daimaou Kosaka; Nashiko Momotsuki
- Voices of: Kenichi Suzumura; Mitsuo Iwata; Kenji Akabane; Genki Okawa; Yuki Nagaku; Inori Minase; Tomokazu Sugita; Yuichi Nakamura; Yasuhiro Takato
- Narrated by: Tomokazu Sugita
- Opening theme: "Mashin Sentai Kiramager" by Yohei Onishi
- Ending theme: "Kiraful Miracle Kiramager" by Takashi Deguchi
- Composer: Junichi Matsumoto
- Country of origin: Japan
- Original language: Japanese
- No. of episodes: 46 (Note: Including episode 0.) (list of episodes)

Production
- Producers: Chihiro Inoue (TV Asahi); Hiroatsu Shimakawa (TV Asahi); Hideaki Tsukada (Toei); Taku Mochizuki (Toei); Kōichi Yada (Toei Advertising); Akihiro Fukada (Toei Advertising)
- Production location: Tokyo, Japan (Greater Tokyo Area)
- Running time: 24–25 minutes
- Production companies: TV Asahi; Toei Company; Toei Advertising

Original release
- Network: ANN (TV Asahi)
- Release: March 8, 2020 – February 28, 2021

Related
- Kishiryu Sentai Ryusoulger; Kikai Sentai Zenkaiger

Mashin Sentai Kiramager (魔進戦隊キラメイジャー, Mashin Sentai Kirameijā; Machine Squadron Kiramager) is a Japanese tokusatsu drama. It is the 44th entry of Toei's long-running Super Sentai metaseries and the first series to air exclusively in the Reiwa era. (Note: Kishiryu Sentai Ryusoulger started production in the Heisei era and went through the transition) Kiramager's main motifs are genies, gemstones and vehicles. It is also the sixth vehicle-themed Super Sentai series. (Note: Other official vehicle-themed Super Sentai include Kousoku Sentai Turboranger, Gekisou Sentai Carranger, GoGo Sentai Boukenger, Engine Sentai Go-onger and Ressha Sentai ToQger.)

The show premiered on March 8, 2020, joining Kamen Rider Zero-One, and later, Kamen Rider Saber in the Super Hero Time line-up on TV Asahi affiliate stations. After its finale in 2021, it was succeeded by Kikai Sentai Zenkaiger.

== Story ==
After planet Crystaria is invaded, Princess Mabushina takes the Kiramai Stones and seeks refuge on Earth to find individuals with strong "shining spirits", or Kiramental, to become the Kiramagers and fight off the threat of Yodonheim, an imperial army of darkness that now plans to invade Earth.

With help from Muryo Hakataminami, the founder of CARAT, a private organization created in preparation for Yodonheim's attack, Mabushina meets the passionate artist Juru Atsuta, the esports professional Tametomo Imizu, the prodigy athlete Sena Hayami, the famous actor Shiguru Oshikiri, and the talented surgeon Sayo Oharu, who accept the duty to protect Earth as the Kiramagers. The team later gains a sixth member: the treasure hunter Takamichi Crystaria, Muryo's long-lost older brother who was adopted into Mabushina's family after he became a human/Crystarian hybrid.

== Episodes ==
No.	English title Original Japanese title	Written by	Original release date
0	"Mashin Sentai Kiramager: Episode Zero"; Transliteration: "Mashin Sentai Kirameijā Episōdo Zero" (Japanese: 魔進戦隊キラメイジャー エピソードＺＥＲＯ)	Naruhisa Arakawa; Ayumi Shimo	February 8, 2020 (Movie version); May 17, 2020 (TV Asahi version)
1	"The Mashin Are Born!"; Transliteration: "Mashin Tanjō!" (Japanese: 魔進誕生！)	Naruhisa Arakawa	March 8, 2020
2	"Leader Certification"; Transliteration: "Rīdā no Shōmei" (Japanese: リーダーの証明)	Naruhisa Arakawa	March 15, 2020
3	"The Vice Guy! No Advice Needed"; Transliteration: "Manriki Yarō! Goiken Muyō" (Japanese: マンリキ野郎！御意見無用)	Naruhisa Arakawa	March 22, 2020
4	"The Princess of the Lost Kingdom"; Transliteration: "Bōkoku no Purinsesu" (Japanese: 亡国のプリンセス)	Naruhisa Arakawa	March 29, 2020
5	"Shovellow Coming Through!"; Transliteration: "Shoberō Makaritōru!" (Japanese: ショベローまかりとおる！)	Naruhisa Arakawa	April 5, 2020
6	"My Friend Turned Five"; Transliteration: "Tsure ga Go-sai ni Narimachite" (Japanese: ツレが5才になりまちて)	Ayumi Shimo	April 12, 2020
7	"Training for You"; Transliteration: "Torēningu o Kimi ni" (Japanese: トレーニングを君に)	Riku Sanjo	April 19, 2020
8	"The Lightning Speed Express"; Transliteration: "Ekusupuresu Denkōsekka" (Japanese: エクスプレス電光石火)	Riku Sanjo	April 26, 2020
9	"The Karuta Path of My Youth"; Transliteration: "Waga Seishun no Karuta-dō" (Japanese: わが青春のかるた道)	Naruhisa Arakawa	May 3, 2020
10	"The Girl Who Chases After Shiguru"; Transliteration: "Shiguru Oikakeru Shōjo" (Japanese: 時雨おいかける少女)	Naruhisa Arakawa	May 10, 2020
SP–1	"Episodes 1 & 2 Unreleased Cut, Warehouse Release, Start Dash Once Again SP"; Transliteration: "Ichi Ni-wa Mikōkai Katto Kuradashi Ima Ichido Sutāto Dasshu Supesharu" (Japanese: 1・2話未公開カット蔵出し いまいちどスタートダッシュSP)	Naruhisa Arakawa	May 24, 2020
SP–2	"Kira Talk! The Partner-Loving Mashin"; Transliteration: "Kira Tōku! Aikata Daisuki Mashin" (Japanese: キラトーーク！ 相方大好き魔進)	Naruhisa Arakawa	May 31, 2020
SP–3	"Kira Talk! This Battle Is Amazing!!"; Transliteration: "Kira Tōku! Kono Batoru ga Sugoi!!" (Japanese: キラトーーク！ このバトルがスゴイ!!)	Naruhisa Arakawa	June 7, 2020
SP–4	"Galza and Carantula's Jamental Laboratory"; Transliteration: "Garuza to Kuranchura no Jamentaru Kenkyūjo" (Japanese: ガルザとクランチュラのジャメンタル研究所)	Naruhisa Arakawa	June 14, 2020
11	"Time Has Been Looped"; Transliteration: "Toki ga Kururi to" (Japanese: 時がクルリと)	Tete Inoue	June 21, 2020
12	"The Nice Guy With the Wonder Drill"; Transliteration: "Wandā Doriru no Kaidanji" (Japanese: ワンダードリルの快男児)	Naruhisa Arakawa	June 28, 2020
13	"The Great Underground Battle"; Transliteration: "Chitei Daisensō" (Japanese: 地底大戦争)	Naruhisa Arakawa	July 5, 2020
14	"The Solitary Ace"; Transliteration: "Kokō no Ēsu" (Japanese: 孤高のエース)	Ayumi Shimo	July 12, 2020
15	"Listen to Takamichi's Voice"; Transliteration: "Kike, Takamichi no Koe" (Japanese: きけ、宝路の声)	Kaori Kaneko	July 19, 2020
16	"Marshmallow Royale"; Transliteration: "Mashumarowaiaru" (Japanese: マシュマロワイアル)	Tete Inoue	July 26, 2020
17	"The Mansion's Rare Stone"; Transliteration: "Yōkan no Kiseki" (Japanese: 洋館の奇石)	Riku Sanjo	August 2, 2020
18	"Falling into Darkness"; Transliteration: "Yami-ochi" (Japanese: 闇落ち)	Riku Sanjo	August 9, 2020
19	"Partners"; Transliteration: "Aibō" (Japanese: 相棒)	Kaori Kaneko	August 16, 2020
20	"A Dangerous Pair"; Transliteration: "Abunai Pea" (Japanese: あぶないペア)	Ayumi Shimo	August 23, 2020
21	"Fishing, Sometimes a Master"; Transliteration: "Tsure, Tokidoki Tatsujin" (Japanese: 釣れ、ときどき達人)	Naruhisa Arakawa	August 30, 2020
22	"Are You Ready? Hey You Witch!"; Transliteration: "Kakugo wa Ii ka Soko no Majo" (Japanese: 覚悟はいいかそこの魔女)	Naruhisa Arakawa	September 6, 2020
23	"Mabushina's Mother"; Transliteration: "Mabushīna no Haha" (Japanese: マブシーナの母)	Ayumi Shimo	September 13, 2020
24	"Let's Start a Band!"; Transliteration: "Bando Shichau zo!" (Japanese: バンドしちゃうぞ！)	Tete Inoue	September 20, 2020
25	"That Cute Shrine Maiden"; Transliteration: "Kawaii Ano Miko" (Japanese: 可愛いあの巫女)	Naruhisa Arakawa	September 27, 2020
26	"Make It an Arrow Weapon"; Transliteration: "Arō na Buki ni Shitekure" (Japanese: アローな武器にしてくれ)	Naruhisa Arakawa	October 4, 2020
27	"Runner in a Big Pinch"; Transliteration: "Dai Pinchi Ran'nā" (Japanese: 大ピンチランナー)	Michiko Yokote	October 11, 2020
28	"Shiguru Cries"; Transliteration: "Shiguru Naki" (Japanese: 時雨泣き)	Kaori Kaneko	October 18, 2020
29	"Atamald of Illusions"; Transliteration: "Maboroshi no Atamarudo" (Japanese: まぼろしのアタマルド)	Tete Inoue	October 25, 2020
30	"The Proud Super Warrior"; Transliteration: "Hokori Takaki Chō Senshi" (Japanese: 誇り高き超戦士)	Ayumi Shimo	November 8, 2020
31	"Toys"; Transliteration: "Omocha" (Japanese: おもちゃ)	Naruhisa Arakawa	November 15, 2020
32	"There's Something About Sayo"; Transliteration: "Sayo ni Kubittake" (Japanese: 小夜に首ったけ)	Naruhisa Arakawa	November 22, 2020
33	"The Giant Monster Panic Clash!"; Transliteration: "Kyojū Panikku Daigekitotsu!" (Japanese: 巨獣パニック大激突！)	Naruhisa Arakawa	November 29, 2020
34	"A Blue and Yellow Passion"; Transliteration: "Ao to Ki no Netsujō" (Japanese: 青と黄の熱情)	Kaori Kaneko	December 6, 2020
35	"A Wandering Mabushina"; Transliteration: "Mabushīna Hōrōki" (Japanese: マブシーナ放浪記)	Tete Inoue	December 13, 2020
36	"Rap"; Transliteration: "Rappu" (Japanese: RAP【ラップ】)	Ayumi Shimo	December 20, 2020
37	"Sena 1/5"; Transliteration: "Sena Go-bun-no-ichi" (Japanese: せな1/5)	Naruhisa Arakawa	December 27, 2020
38	"Under Uncle's Moon"; Transliteration: "Oji no Tsuki o Miteiru" (Japanese: 叔父の月を見ている)	Tete Inoue	January 10, 2021
39	"The Emperor Is a Sniper"; Transliteration: "Kōtei wa Sunaipā" (Japanese: 皇帝はスナイパー)	Kaori Kaneko	January 17, 2021
40	"The Pained"; Transliteration: "Itamu Hito" (Japanese: 痛む人)	Tomihiko Tokunaga	January 24, 2021
41	"I Want to Be as I Am"; Transliteration: "Ari no Mama de Itai" (Japanese: ありのままでいたい)	Michiko Yokote	January 31, 2021
42	"A Battle Without Honor and Humanity"; Transliteration: "Jingi Naki Tatakai" (Japanese: 仁義なき戦い)	Ayumi Shimo	February 7, 2021
43	"The Dirty Hero"; Transliteration: "Yogoreta Eiyū" (Japanese: 汚れた英雄)	Naruhisa Arakawa	February 14, 2021
44	"Rest in Peace, My Friend"; Transliteration: "Tomo yo, Shizuka ni Nemure" (Japanese: 友よ、静かに眠れ)	Naruhisa Arakawa	February 21, 2021
45 (Final)	"You Were There, and Shined"; Transliteration: "Kimi-tachi ga Ite Kagayaita" (Japanese: 君たちがいて輝いた)	Naruhisa Arakawa	February 28, 2021

== Production ==
Mashin Sentai Kiramager was trademarked in September and officially announced on Christmas Day, 2019. The main cast was officially revealed on January 16, 2020.

=== Impact of the COVID-19 pandemic ===
On March 31, 2020, a press conference held by TV Asahi revealed that Rio Komiya, the actor playing Juru Atsuta, had tested positive for COVID-19. The production of Mashin Sentai Kiramager had stopped since the previous week. However, Toei announced that they had episodes filmed until May.

News also came out that Toei Studios shut down for disinfection in response. However, on April 3, Toei released a statement saying it was false, calling it misinformation. As of April 5, Komiya's health was improving and all of the series' staff, cast, and the veteran Super Sentai actors and actresses who supported his recovery were waiting for his speedy recovery and return to the set so they could continue filming. On April 9, Komiya had announced via his Twitter that he was officially discharged from the hospital, however, he would still remain in self-quarantine at home for at least two weeks.

The show was eventually put on hiatus after the airing of Episode 10 on May 10, with four specials and a televised version of Episode Zero airing in its place. With the state of emergency lifted on May 26, Toei resumed filming of the show on June 1, with Episode 11 airing on June 21. In regards to the summer movie, it was postponed alongside Kamen Rider Zero-One the Movie: Real×Time.

== Films & Specials ==
=== Theatrical ===
==== Episode Zero ====
A month before the premiere of the television series, Mashin Sentai Kiramager Episode Zero (魔進戦隊キラメイジャー エピソードZERO, Mashin Sentai Kirameijā Episōdo Zero) was released as a prequel movie in Japanese theaters on February 8, 2020, as part of Super Sentai Movie Party (スーパー戦隊MOVIEパーティー, Sūpā Sentai Mūbī Pātī). The movie was double billed with Kishiryu Sentai Ryusoulger VS Lupinranger VS Patranger the Movie, which featured a crossover between Kishiryu Sentai Ryusoulger and Kaitou Sentai Lupinranger VS Keisatsu Sentai Patranger. As the events of the film take place before the first episode of the series, the plot of the film mainly focuses on Mabushina's exodus to Earth and scouting people with Kiramental who can help her fend off the Yodonheim assassins sent after her. During the show's hiatus, an edited version of Episode Zero was aired on television on May 17, 2020, in lieu of a new episode.

==== Be-Bop Dream ====
Mashin Sentai Kiramager the Movie: Be-Bop Dream (魔進戦隊キラメイジャー THE MOVIE ビー・バップ・ドリーム, Mashin Sentai Kirameijā Za Mūbī Bī Bappu Dorīmu) was scheduled for release in Japanese theaters on July 23, 2020, double billed with Kamen Rider Zero-One the Movie: Real×Time. However, both were postponed due to the COVID-19 pandemic. On August 30, 2020, it was announced that the film was rescheduled for release in Spring 2021. On December 6, 2020, it was announced that the film was released on February 20, 2021, as part of Super Sentai Movie Ranger 2021 (スーパー戦隊MOVIEレンジャー2021, Sūpā Sentai Mūbī Renjā Nisen-nijū-ichi) alongside Kishiryu Sentai Ryusoulger Special: Memory of Soulmates and Kikai Sentai Zenkaiger the Movie: Red Battle! All Sentai Great Assemble!!. Mitsu Dan portrayed the film's main antagonist, Minjo. The events of the film take place between episodes 23 and 24 of the series. The film also includes a cameo of PPAP (Pen-Pineapple-Apple-Pen) performed by Daimaou Kosaka, who is also Muryo Hakataminami's actor in the series.

=== Special episodes ===
Following Rio Komiya's infection with COVID-19, production of the series was halted for a few weeks. In the interim, these special episodes featuring old footage were released after a special airing of Episode Zero.

- Episodes 1 & 2 Unreleased Cut, Warehouse Release, Start Dash Once Again SP (1・2話未公開カット蔵出し いまいちどスタートダッシュSP, Ichi Ni-wa Mikōkai Katto Kuradashi Ima Ichido Sutāto Dasshu Supesharu): A special that covers the first two episodes with deleted scenes.
- Kira Talk! (キラトーーク！, Kira Tōku!): An Ametalk-style two-week variety show special with the Kiramai Stones talking about their battles and partners in the first ten episodes.
- Galza and Carantula's Jamental Institute (ガルザとクランチュラのジャメンタル研究所, Garuza to Kuranchura no Jamentaru Kenkyūjo): A special that covers the Jamenshi they made to fight the Kiramagers in the first ten episodes.

=== V-Cinema ===
==== Kiramager vs. Ryusoulger ====
Mashin Sentai Kiramager vs. Ryusoulger (魔進戦隊キラメイジャーVSリュウソウジャー, Mashin Sentai Kirameijā Tai Ryūsōjā) is a V-Cinema release that features a crossover between Kiramager and Kishiryu Sentai Ryusoulger. The V-Cinema received a limited theatrical release on April 29, 2021, followed by its DVD and Blu-ray release on August 4, 2021. The events of the V-Cinema take place between episodes 26 and 27 of the series.

==== Ten Gokaiger ====
Kaizoku Sentai: Ten Gokaiger (テン・ゴーカイジャー, Ten Gōkaijā) is a V-Cinema release which received a limited theatrical release on November 12, 2021, followed by its DVD and Blu-ray release on March 9, 2022. The V-Cinema commemorates the 10th anniversary of Kaizoku Sentai Gokaiger and features an appearance by Kohei Shoji as Kiramager character Takamichi Crystaria.

==== Zenkaiger vs. Kiramager vs. Senpaiger ====
Kikai Sentai Zenkaiger vs. Kiramager vs. Senpaiger (機界戦隊ゼンカイジャーVSキラメイジャーVSセンパイジャー, Kikai Sentai Zenkaijā Tai Kirameijā Tai Senpaijā) is a V-Cinema release that features a crossover between Kiramager and Kikai Sentai Zenkaiger. The V-Cinema received a limited theatrical release on April 29, 2022, followed by its DVD and Blu-ray release on September 28, 2022. Additionally, Ryota Ozawa of Kaizoku Sentai Gokaiger and Asahi Ito of Kaitou Sentai Lupinranger VS Keisatsu Sentai Patranger reprised their respective roles as Captain Marvelous/Gokai Red and Kairi Yano/Lupin Red. The events of the V-Cinema take place after the final episode of Zenkaiger.

=== Web episodes ===
==== Mashin Folktale Theater ====
Mashin Folktale Theater (ましんむかしばなし劇場, Mashin Mukashi Banashi Gekijō) is a web-exclusive animated short series released on Toei Tokusatsu YouTube Official.

1. Momotarō (ももたろう)
2. Urashima Tarō (うらしまたろう)
3. The North Wind and the Sun (きたかぜとタイヨウ, Kitakaze to Taiyō)
4. The Three Little Pigs (さんびきのこぶた, San-biki no Kobuta)
5. Cinderella (シンデレラ, Shinderera)

==== Yodonna series ====
Yodonna is a web-exclusive series from Toei Tokusatsu Fan Club that focuses on the villain Yodonna. Nashiko Momotsuki, Mizuki Saiba, Rio Komiya, and Rui Kihara return to perform their roles from the main series. The events of the web-exclusive series take place after the final episode of the series and see Yodonna possessing the Kiramagers' ally Mizuki Kakihara in an attempt to revive herself.

- Yodonna (ヨドンナ): The titular first entry of the web-exclusive series released on August 8, 2021.
- Yodonna 2 (ヨドンナ2, Yodonna Tsū): A sequel to the titular first entry of the web-exclusive series released on September 12, 2021.
- Yodonna 3: Yodonna's Valentine (ヨドンナ3 ヨドンナのバレンタイン, Yodonna Surī Yodonna no Barentain): A sequel to the titular second entry of the web-exclusive series released on March 5, 2023.
- Yodonna: The Final (ヨドンナ THE FINAL, Yodonna Za Fainaru): A sequel to the titular third entry of the web-exclusive series released on March 3, 2024.

== Cast ==
- Juru Atsuta (熱田 充瑠, Atsuta Jūru): Rio Komiya (小宮 璃央, Komiya Rio)
- Tametomo Imizu (射水 為朝, Imizu Tametomo): Rui Kihara (木原 瑠生, Kihara Rui)
- Sena Hayami (速見 瀬奈, Hayami Sena): Yume Shinjo (新條 由芽, Shinjō Yume)
- Shiguru Oshikiri (押切 時雨, Oshikiri Shiguru): Atomu Mizuishi (水石 亜飛夢, Mizuishi Atomu)
- Sayo Oharu (大治 小夜, Ōharu Sayo): Mio Kudo (工藤 美桜, Kudō Mio)
- Takamichi Crystaria (クリスタリア 宝路, Kurisutaria Takamichi): Kohei Shoji (庄司 浩平, Shōji Kōhei)
- Muryo Hakataminami (博多南 無鈴, Hakataminami Muryō): Daimaou Kosaka (古坂大魔王, Kosaka Daimaō)
- Mizuki Kakihara (柿原 瑞希, Kakihara Mizuki): Mizuki Saiba (西葉 瑞希, Saiba Mizuki)
- Yodonna (ヨドンナ): Nashiko Momotsuki (桃月 なしこ, Momotsuki Nashiko)

=== Voice cast ===
- Mashin Fire (魔進ファイヤ, Mashin Faiya): Kenichi Suzumura (鈴村 健一, Suzumura Ken'ichi)
- Mashin Shovellow (魔進ショベロー, Mashin Shoberō): Mitsuo Iwata (岩田 光央, Iwata Mitsuo)
- Mashin Mach (魔進マッハ, Mashin Mahha): Kenji Akabane (赤羽根 健治, Akabane Kenji)
- Mashin Jetter (魔進ジェッタ, Mashin Jetta): Genki Okawa (大河 元気, Ōkawa Genki)
- Mashin Helico (魔進ヘリコ, Mashin Heriko): Yuki Nagaku (長久 友紀, Nagaku Yuki)
- Mashin Lifton (魔進リフトン, Mashin Rifuton): Yuki Anai (穴井 勇輝, Anai Yuki)
- Mashin Rolland (魔進ローランド, Mashin Rorand): Kazuki Komine (小峰 一己, Koime Kazuki)
- Mashin Cally (魔進キャリー, Mashin Kyarii): Ayaka Maekawa (前川 綾香, Maekawa Ayaka)
- Mashin Duston (魔進ダストン, Mashin Dasuton): Kei Yamamori (山森 圭, Yamamori Kei)
- Mashin Magellan (魔進マゼラン, Mashin Mazeran): Takanobu Shimazu (島津 孝暢, Shimazu Takanobu)
- Mashin Zabyun (魔進ザビューン, Mashin Zabyūn): Hiroyuki Yoshino (吉野 裕行, Yoshino Hiroyuki)
- Mashin Hakobu (魔進ハコブー, Mashin Hakobu): Tetsu Inada (稲田 徹, Inada Tetsu)
- Mabushina (マブシーナ, Mabushīna): Inori Minase (水瀬 いのり, Minase Inori)
- Oradin (オラディン): Tomokazu Sugita (杉田 智和, Sugita Tomokazu)
- Mabayuine (マバユイネ): Houko Kuwashima (桑島 法子, Kuwashima Hōko)
- Galza (ガルザ, Garuza), Yodon Changer (ヨドンチェンジャー, Yodon Chenjā): Yuichi Nakamura (中村 悠一, Nakamura Yūichi)
- Carantula (クランチュラ, Kuranchura): Yasuhiro Takato (高戸 靖広, Takato Yasuhiro)
- Emperor Yodon (ヨドン皇帝, Yodon-kōtei): Kazuhiro Yamaji (山路 和弘, Yamaji Kazuhiro)
- Narrator, Kiramager Equipment: Tomokazu Sugita (杉田 智和, Sugita Tomokazu)

=== Guest cast ===
- Tetsuo Daimonji (大文字 鉄夫, Daimonji Tetsuo; 6): Seiju Umon (右門 青寿, Umon Seiju)
- Iyo Kodera (古寺 良世, Kodera Iyo; 10): Nana Owada (大和田 南那, Ōwada Nana)
- Takeshi (たけし; 19): Tenta Banka (番家天嵩, Banka Tenta)
- Koya (幸也, Kōya; 24): Kenshiro Kato (加藤 憲史郎, Katō Kenshirō)
- Band members (24): Yohei Onishi (大西 洋平, Ōnishi Yōhei), Takashi Deguchi (出口 たかし, Deguchi Takashi)
- Temple Priest (25–26): Kenta Satoi (佐戸井けん太, Satoi Kenta)
- Miki Masaki (真咲 美希, Masaki Miki; 27): Kazue Itō (伊藤 かずえ, Itō Kazue)
- Natsume Masaki (真咲 なつめ, Masaki Natsume; 27): Sakina Kuwae (桑江 咲菜, Kuwae Sakina)
- Yujin Kusaka (日下 優人, Kusaka Yujin; 32): Koji Kominami (小南 光司, Kominami Kōji)
- Ice pop seller (35): Hiroya Matsumoto (松本 寛也, Matsumoto Hiroya)
- Rapper (36): Shinpeita (晋平太)
- Saburo Hatta (八太 三郎, Hatta Saburo) (40): Soya Kaya (賀屋 壮也, Kaya Sōya) of comedy duo Kagaya (かが屋)

== Songs ==
Opening theme

Song	Lyrics	Composition	Arrangement	Artist	Episodes
"Mashin Sentai Kiramager" (魔進戦隊キラメイジャー, Mashin Sentai Kirameijā)	Shoko Fujibayashi (藤林 聖子, Fujibayashi Shōko)	KoTa		Yohei Onishi	All

Ending theme

Song	Lyrics	Composition	Arrangement	Artist	Episodes
"Kiraful Miracle Kiramager" (キラフル ミラクル キラメイジャー, Kirafuru Mirakuru Kirameijā)	Shoko Fujibayashi	Takafumi Iwasaki (岩崎 貴文, Iwasaki Takafumi)	Hiroaki Kagoshima (籠島 裕昌, Kagoshima Hiroaki)	Takashi Deguchi	1 - 22, 32 - 45

From episodes 23 to 31, the following character songs replaced "Kiraful Miracle Kiramager" as the ending theme.

- "Crystal Signal" (クリスタル・シグナル, Kurisutaru Shigunaru) performed by Mabushina (Inori Minase)
- "Yūki o Kanadete" (勇気を奏でて; "Letting Courage Ring Out") performed by Kiramai Band (キラメイバンド, Kiramei Bando)
- "Hirameking! Kagayaking!" (ひらめキーング！かがやキーング！, Hiramekīngu! Kagayakīngu!; "Inspiring! Shining!") performed by Juru Atsuta (Rio Komiya)
- "Dangan Shooting Star" (弾丸Shooting Star, Dangan Shūtingu Sutā; "Bullet Shooting Star") performed by Tametomo Imizu (Rui Kihara)
- "Winding Road" performed by Sena Hayami (Yume Shinjo)
- "Perfect Blue" performed by Shiguru Oshikiri (Atomu Mizuishi)
- "Kiseki o Yume Miru?" (キセキをユメみる？; "Dreaming of a Miracle?") performed by Sayo Oharu (Mio Kudo)
- "Hakase ja Nai yo, Hakata da yo! Shikamo Minami da yo!" (博士じゃないよ、博多だよ！しかも南だよ！; "I'm No Hakase, I'm Just Hakata! And Minami on Top of That!") performed by Muryo Hakataminami (Daimaou Kosaka)
- "Wonder Shugoshin" (ワンダー守護神, Wandā Shugoshin; "Wonder Guardian") performed by Takamichi Crystaria (Kohei Shoji).
