= PPAP (Pen-Pineapple-Apple-Pen) =

Song by Pikotaro

Single by Pikotaro
- Released: 7 October 2016
- Recorded: 2016
- Genre: J-pop, electro-pop, dance-pop, techno
- Length: 0:45
- Label: Avex Music Creative
- Songwriter: Daimaou Kosaka
- Producer: Daimaou Kosaka

Pikotaro singles chronology
"PPAP (Pen-Pineapple-Apple-Pen)" (2016)	"The Theme Song of Pikotaro" (2016)

Music video
- PPAP (Pen-Pineapple-Apple-Pen) on YouTube

"PPAP (Pen-Pineapple-Apple-Pen)" (Japanese: ペンパイナッポーアッポーペン, Hepburn: Penpainappōappōpen) is a single by Pikotaro, a fictional singer-songwriter created and portrayed by Japanese comedian Daimaou Kosaka. It was released as a music video on YouTube on 25 August 2016, and has since become a viral video. As of October 2026, the official video has been viewed more than 189 million times where as "PPAP (Long Version)", released by Ultra Records has garnered more than 515 million views. PPAP spawned parodies, and was hailed as the new "Gangnam Style" by various newspapers and online media. The single itself reached number 1 on the Billboard Japan Hot 100 chart. At the time of its release (with a duration of 0:45), it became the shortest single to chart on the Billboard Hot 100, a record that was later broken by Kid Cudi's "Beautiful Trip" (0:37). At the end of 2016, the song charted at number 6 on Japan Hot 100 Year-end Chart.

On 4 April 2020, in response to the COVID-19 pandemic, Pikotaro uploaded a remix of the song titled "PPAP-2020". In the remix, Pikotaro pretends to combine his hands with soap, and repeats "Wash! Wash! Wash! Wash!" while pretending to wash his hands. In the end, he tells the viewers to "Pray for People and Peace." In Mashin Sentai Kiramager the Movie: Be-Bop Dream, Muryo Hakataminami, portrayed by Kosaka, sings PPAP to wake the Kiramagers.

== Background and composition ==
Kosaka, the creator of "PPAP", said in an interview that he came up with the song sitting in his house. He was listening to the tune when he picked up a pen to start writing. He thought about his background of being from Japan's biggest apple-producing region (Aomori Prefecture) as he also realized that he had an open can of pineapple slices on the table.

The song is written in the key of C♯ minor with a common time tempo of 136 beats per minute. Pikotaro's vocals span from F♯_{3} to C♯_{5} in the song. The cowbell sound of the Roland TR-808 is used throughout the song.

== Music video ==
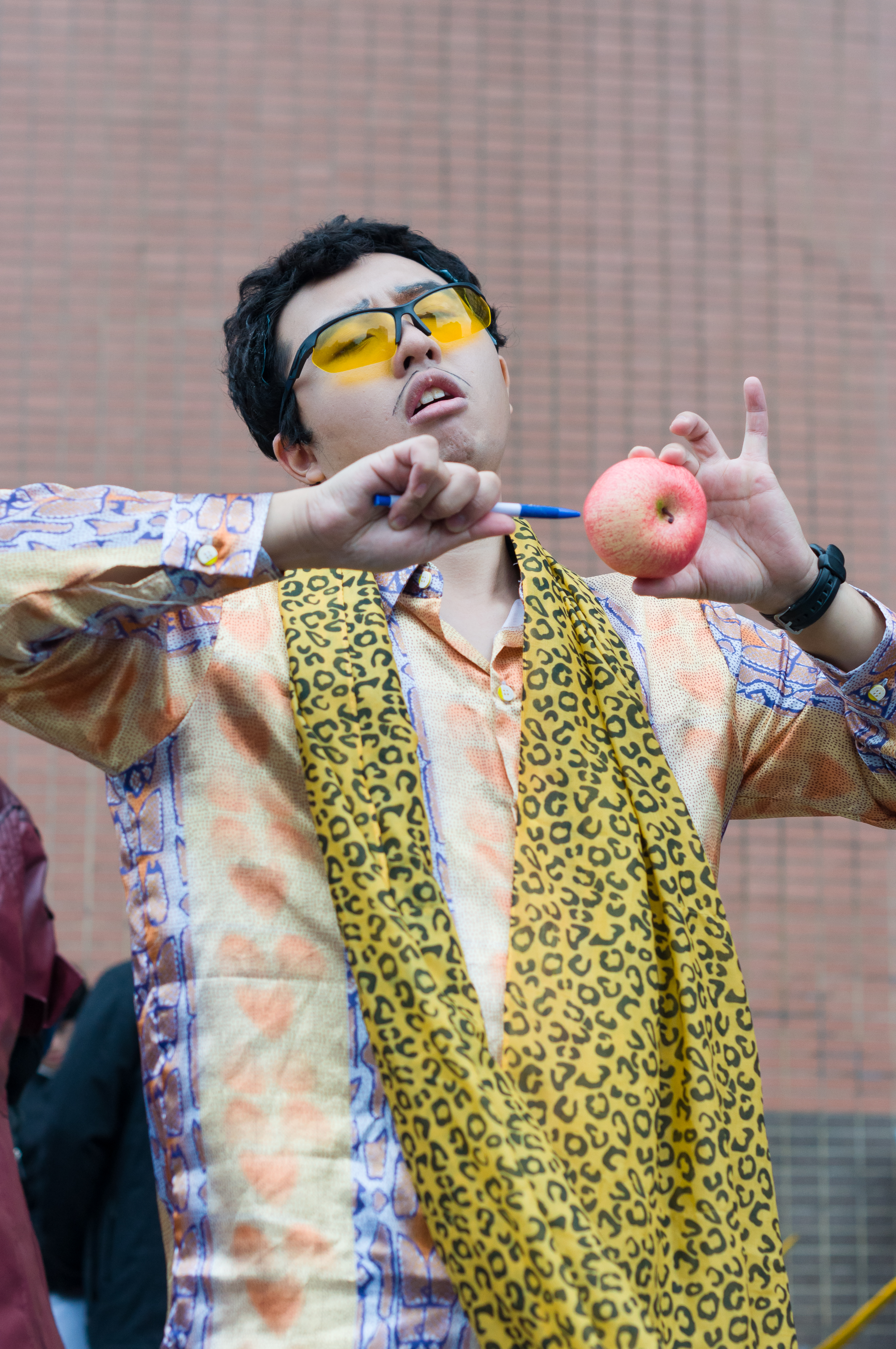
Cosplayer of Pikotaro

The song originated as a music video released on YouTube on 25 August 2016. In the video, Pikotaro, dressed in a yellow leopard animal print costume, dances and sings in English "I have a pen, I have an apple. Uh! Apple pen," while making the gestures of holding the named items and combining them. The video's cost of production was around 100,000 yen.

On 26 September, Pikotaro released a video on how to do the dance and the gestures. On 27 October, Pikotaro posted a "long version" of the music video.

On 7 November, a version of the video featuring the character Ryuk from the manga series Death Note was released as a promotion for the film Death Note: Light Up the New World. On 17 November, Pikotaro made an appearance on the Japanese edition of Sesame Street, where he joined Elmo and Cookie Monster in singing their version of the song titled "CBCC (Cookie-Butter-Choco-Cookie)".

Pikotaro has since revisited the compounding-words concept of PPAP in later music videos, such as the musically similar "Beetle Booon But Bean in Bottle (BBBBB)" [sic].

== Release ==
"PPAP", alongside three other works by Pikotaro, was released to digital storefronts through Avex Music Creative on 7 October 2016. An instrumental version of the song was made available on 12 October 2016.

== Reception ==
The video accumulated about 1 million hits in its first month of play. Kosaka remarked it was mostly popular among Japanese students. On 27 September 2016, Canadian pop singer Justin Bieber shared the video on Twitter, captioning it as his "favorite video on the Internet". The video then went viral, averaging over 1.5 million hits a day, and was touted as the new "Gangnam Style" by various newspapers and online media. It has spawned many videos from people doing their own versions. On the YouTube music video charts it reached number 1, and stayed there for three weeks in a row. A PPAP Cafe in Tokyo was open for 20 days starting from 1 November 2016.

== Chart performance ==
The song debuted at number four on the Billboard Japan Hot 100 dated 22 October 2016. The following week it climbed to number three and the week after that it peaked at number two. After dropping to number three, it topped the chart for the 14 November edition.

The song debuted on the Billboard Hot 100 in the United States at number 77, and at 45 seconds in length, becoming the shortest song to chart in its history at the time. The previous shortest song was "Little Boxes" by The Womenfolk, which reached number 83 in 1964 and was 1 minute and 2 seconds in length. The fact was recognized by Guinness World Records. The song has since reappeared twice more, at number 82 for the week of 26 November, and 93 the week of 3 December.

== Charts ==
=== Weekly charts ===
Weekly chart performance for "PPAP (Pen-Pineapple-Apple-Pen)"
Chart (2016–2017)	Peak position
Belgium (Ultratip Bubbling Under Flanders)	5
Canada Hot 100 (Billboard)	36
Hungary (Single Top 40)	29
Japan Hot 100 (Billboard)	1
South Korea International Singles (Gaon)	22
US Billboard Hot 100	77
US Billboard Dance/Electronic Digital Song Sales	37

=== Year-end charts ===
Year-end chart performance for "PPAP (Pen-Pineapple-Apple-Pen)"
Chart (2016)	Position
Japan (Japan Hot 100)	6

== Certifications ==
Region	Certification	Certified units/sales
Japan (RIAJ)	Gold	100,000^{*}
^{*} Sales figures based on certification alone.
