= Beautiful Lady & Television =

Japanese television magazine

- Categories: Television magazine
- Frequency: Monthly
- Circulation: 560,000
- Publisher: Tokyo News Service
- Founded: 1997
- First issue: 24 September 1997; 27 years ago
- Country: Japan
- Based in: Tokyo
- Language: Japanese
- Website: net.blt.tv

Beautiful Lady & Television is a Japanese monthly television magazine published by Tokyo News Service. The magazine is popularly known as B.L.T.

The magazine was first published 24 September 1997 targeting the market of young males aged up to 20. It contained nothing but women idols and monthly television listings. The magazine is available in different editions for the Kanto, Kansai, Chubu, Hokkaido, and Kyushu regions (NHK and five local television stations in Fukuoka). The Kansai edition is called Kansai B.L.T.
