= Nashiko Momotsuki =

Japanese model and actress (born 1995)

- 桃月なしこ
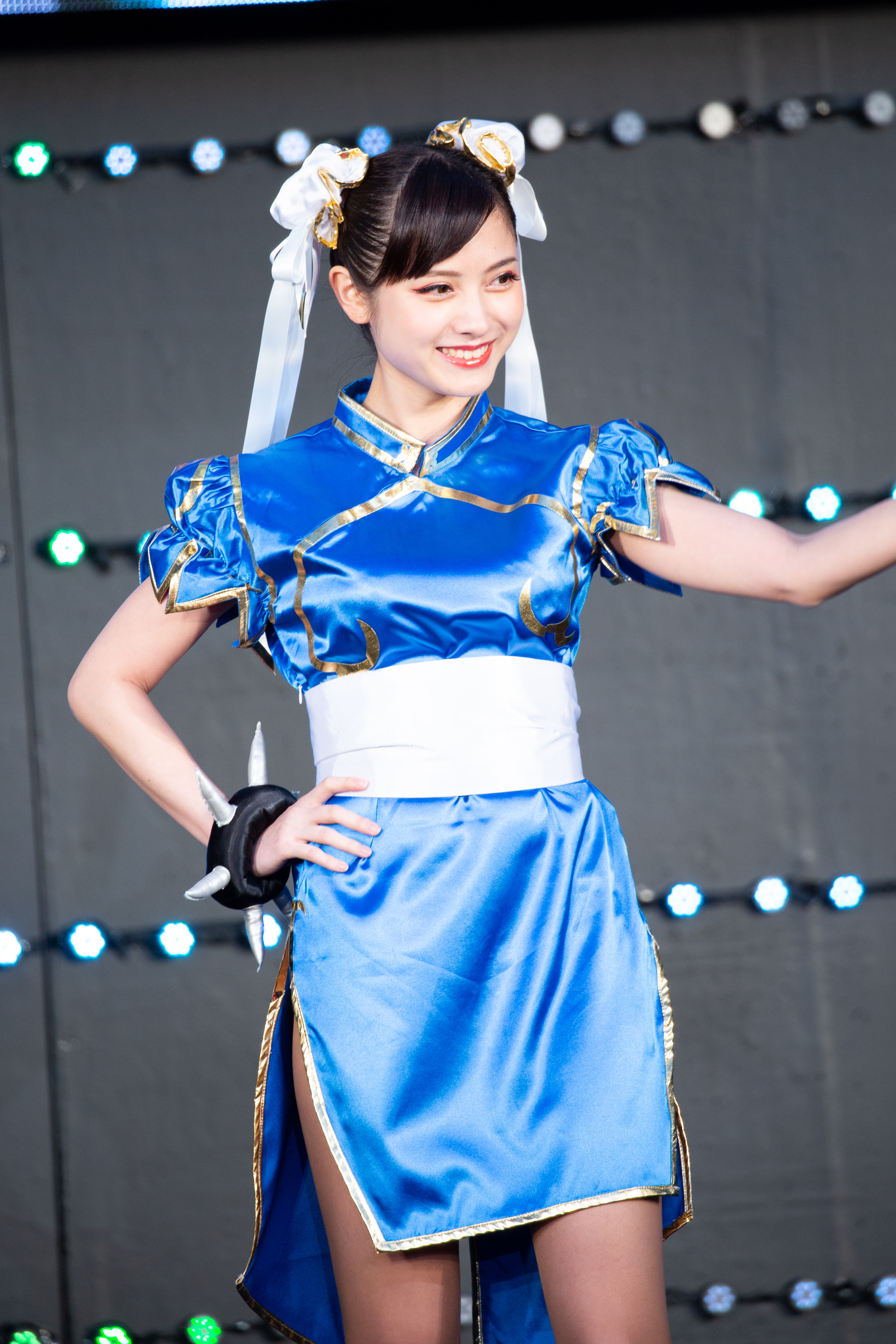
- Nashiko Momotsuki in 2018, in character as Chun-Li
- Born: Kazuna Ōbayashi; November 8, 1995 (age 31); Toyohashi, Aichi Prefecture, Japan
- Occupations: Actress; cosplayer; fashion model
- Years active: 2017–present
- Agent: 01familia
- Modeling information
- Height: 161 cm (5 ft 3 in)

YouTube information
- Channel: Nashiko Momotsuki Anything-goes Channel
- Years active: 2022–present
- Genres: Gravure modeling; gaming; travel
- Subscribers: 104,000
- Views: 14,319,740
- Last updated: 31 August 2026
- Website: Official website

Nashiko Momotsuki (Japanese: 桃月なしこ, Hepburn: Momotsuki Nashiko; born November 8, 1995) is a Japanese actress, professional cosplayer, model, and licensed practical nurse. She is represented by 01familia and came into prominence for portraying the character Yodonna in Mashin Sentai Kiramager (2020) and related works.

Originally a nurse, Momotsuki was scouted by her agency in 2017 and entered the entertainment industry as a gravure model, attracting attention due to her day job. She was appointed an exclusive model for Bis in October 2019 and released her own photo books in 2020 and 2022. As an actress, she first appeared in a television drama in 2019 and appeared in Mashin Sentai Kiramager the year after, followed by appearances in several films in the franchise, as well as Garo: Versus Road (2020) and Short Program (2022). She is also a regular performer on the Zeroichi TV YouTube channel and has made her voice acting debut in Love After World Domination (2022). She was appointed tourism ambassador for her hometown of Toyohashi, Aichi Prefecture, in 2026.

== Biography ==
Momotsuki was born and raised in Toyohashi, Aichi Prefecture. After graduating from high school, Momotsuki started working as a nurse assistant at a hospital in her hometown after she learned that it would allow her to attend nursing school while working to pay the tuition. She became a nurse in 2016, and after her entertainment debut, she left Toyohashi and started working at a clinic in Tokyo. As late as January 2021, she was still active as a nurse.

Momotsuki started cosplaying in her third year of high school at a local cosplay event. Her stage name was taken from the mascot Funassyi and the webcomic character Shinya Momotsuki. She was scouted in 2017 by her agency and made her magazine debut in the November edition of Weekly Young Magazine, billed as "The Exceedingly Beautiful Nurse" (美人すぎるナース). As her job offers increased, she moved to Tokyo to further develop her entertainment career and attended various classes related to acting and modelling, as well as English and Chinese language lessons.

Momotsuki made her first television appearance on the talk show Hatsumimigaku on MBS in February 2018. She appeared at the 2018 Nurse Fes Tokyo as a moderator for the "Nurse Plus One" event, which introduced nurses who were also active in other fields like herself. She also served as a judge for the DC Comics cosplay contest at Tokyo Comic-Con 2018 and made her commercial debut for the mobile game The Alchemist Code. She made her television drama debut on episode 4 of 10-jin Spy Daisakusen: Code Balikata, aired on Television Saitama and affiliated stations in February 2019.

In October, Momotsuki was selected as a regular model for the women's fashion magazine Bis. She had previously been featured in the June edition, and mentioned that being a regular magazine model had been one of her "major goals".

On September 25, 2020, Momotsuki made her first appearance as whip-wielding supporting antagonist Yodonna on episode 25 of Mashin Sentai Kiramager. The character was well-received, being given such nicknames as "The Exceedingly Beautiful Enemy Officer", and in 2021 she became the protagonist of two spin-off web films set after the events of the main series, Yodonna and Yodonna 2, followed in 2023 by Yodonna 3: Yodonna's Valentine and the final installment in 2024, Yodonna: The Final. The films were released on the Toei Tokusatsu Fan Club (TTFC) service and are the first spin-off media starring a villain character in the Super Sentai franchise.

On November 11, 2020, Momotsuki released her first photo book, titled Mikan (未完; lit. 'Incomplete') and published by Kodansha. Photography for the book took place on Ishigaki Island, Okinawa, and the title was both meant as an expression of her "immaturity" and a homophone of "tangerine" (mikan), inspired by the words "peach" (桃, momo) and "pear" (nashi) in her name. It was reprinted three times and sold over 10,000 copies within 2 months after release and placed fifth on the Weekly Oricon Photobook Chart.

Momotsuki is a regular on 01familia's YouTube channel Zeroichi TV and is the host for the agency's first terrestrial monthly variety show, Zeroichi Familia wa Homeraretai (ゼロイチファミリアは褒められたい; lit. '01familia Wants to be Praised') on MBS TV, both of which started in October 2021.

On March 30, 2022, Momotsuki released her second photo book with the English title Peachy, a reference to both her name and the actual English word. The book would reveal details about her private life, including photos of her actual home and an interview with her brother, and also feature a "date" with her favorite Japanese idol, Rin Kurusu of 26-ji no Masquerade. The book sold about 2000 copies in its first week and ranked fifth on the Weekly Oricon Photobook Chart. That month, she also served as an ambassador for DC Comics' "The Dawn of Superheroes" travelling exhibition and threw out a ceremonial first pitch for a baseball game at Vantelin Dome Nagoya in cosplay as Supergirl.

Momotsuki is a Pokémon enthusiast and an avid player of Pokémon Go and the Pokémon Trading Card Game. She was an invited player in the Pokémon Card Game Champions League 2025 Fukuoka, where she achieved 2 wins before being eliminated after 3 losses, and was noted for her "serious" deck. She was also a guest at the launching of the "Pokémon Card Game Tokyo Luminous Night" projection mapping attraction at the Tokyo Metropolitan Government Building No. 1 in 2026.

In August 2026, Momotsuki was appointed "Toyohashi Appeal Ambassador" (とよはし魅力アンバサダー, Toyohashi Miryoku Anbasadā) to promote tourism in her hometown of Toyohashi. The same month, she served as first torchbearer representing the city in the torch relay leading up to the 2026 Asian Games, hosted in Nagoya.

== Personal life ==
Momotsuki's interests include cosplay, manga, games, piano, and following Japanese idol groups. She is left-handed, but uses her right hand when writing and using knives.

== Appearances ==
=== Film ===
Year	Title	Role	Notes	Ref.
2021	Mashin Sentai Kiramager vs. Ryusoulger	Yodonna		
2021	Yodonna	Yodonna	Lead role; streaming film	
2021	Yodonna 2	Yodonna	Lead role; streaming film	
2022	The Three Young-Men in Midnight: The Movie	Waitress		
2023	Yodonna 3: Yodonna's Valentine	Yodonna	Lead role; streaming film	
2024	Yodonna: The Final	Yodonna	Lead role; streaming film	
2024	The Three Young-Men in Midnight: The Movie 2	Waitress		
2026	Ninja Wars: Blackfox vs. Shogun's Ninja			

=== Television series ===
Year	Title	Role	Notes	Ref.
2019	10-jin Spy Daisakusen: Code Balikata	Shinon Koinaka	Episode 4	
2019	Video Girl Mai 2019	Sayaka Katō		
2020	Mashin Sentai Kiramager	Yodonna		
2020	Garo: Versus Road	Shuka		
2022	Kasouken no Onna	Jun Kawakubo	Season 21, episode 12	
2022	Love After World Domination	Ran Ran (voice)		
2022	Short Program	Misato Yamane		
2024	Mentsuyu Hitori Meshi	Yuzuna Motosu	Season 2	
2024	Reiwa no San-eiketsu!	Miho Takeda		
2026	Dekiai: Jitsu wa, Saikyō Hīrō	Satsuki Takahara	Female lead	

=== Variety show ===
Year	Title	Role	Notes	Ref.
2021–present	Zeroichi Familia wa Homeraretai	Host		

=== Theater ===
Year	Title	Role	Notes	Ref.
2019	Transfer Student	Misato Yamane		
2022	Anohana	Naruko Anjo		

=== Cosplay events ===
Year	Title	Role(s)	Notes	Ref.
2017	Niconico Chokaigi 2017	Various		
2018	Ready Player One Japan premiere	Chun-Li		
2018	Tokyo Comic-Con 2018	Supergirl	Also a judge for DC Comics cosplay contest	
