= J:COM BS =

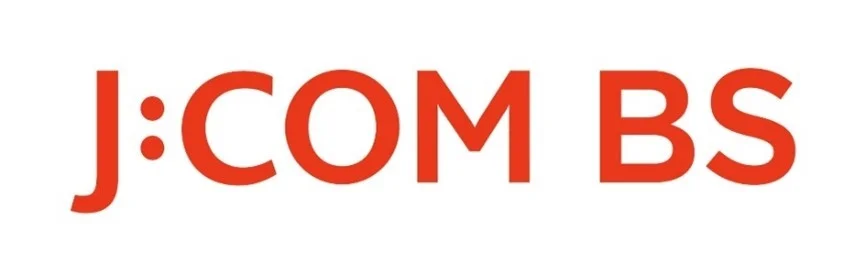
- Type: Satellite television network
- Country: Japan
- Headquarters: Ginza, Chūō, Tokyo

Programming
- Language: Japanese
- Picture format: HDTV 1080i

Ownership
- Owner: J:COM BS, Inc.

History
- Launched: 26 March 2022; 4 years ago
- Former names: BS Shochiku Tokyu (2022–2025)

Links
- Website: www.jcom-bs.co.jp (in Japanese)

J:COM BS (formerly known as BS Shochiku Tokyu) is a Japanese satellite television channel owned by J:COM BS Inc. (J:COM BS株式会社, Jeikomu Bīesu Kabushiki-gaisha), a wholly owned subsidiary of J:COM. The channel launched in 2022 as BS Shochiku Tokyu. It was set to close on June 30, 2025, due to financial difficulties, but was saved by J:COM close to two months before the deadline.

== History ==
On May 20, 2019, the Ministry of Internal Affairs and Communications announced that Shochiku and Tokyu were showing their interest in setting up a joint free-to-view satellite channel. The license received approval on September 9, while on November 29, it received a certification to operate.

The company was founded on July 22, 2020, with a tentative 2021 launch date. On October 1, 2021, following reports about Tohokushinsha being probed for breaching foreign investment laws, BS Shochiku Tokyu was probed for the naming of foreigners for executive posts, receiving administrative warnings to prevent this from happening again.

On January 6, 2022, the channel announced its launch date and time: March 26 at 7pm; as well as its channel number (260). Test transmissions began on March 9, alongside BS Japanext and BS Yoshimoto. Xymax acquired some capital in the company on August 25, 2022, using the channel as means to expand its presence, including the provision of data for its MEQQE app. The channel aired nearly 300 movies a year, not only from Shochiku, but also from other companies, from both Japan and abroad.

On February 2, 2023, BS Shochiku Tokyu introduced its mascots, designed by Studio Ghibli president and executive Toshio Suzuki. These were based on an adult couple. Initially nameless, the male character was later named Gintoki and the female character, Miru-san. On March 27, 2023, it launched BS Shochiku Tokyu On Demand and joined the Japan Commercial Broadcasters Association as an associate member, alongside the new satellite channels, on April 1, as well as the Satellite Broadcasting Association. In March 2024, it received investments from Xebio, Toei and Toei Animation.

On March 12, 2025, it was announced that its VOD service would shut down on March 31. At the beginning of fiscal 2025, the station announced its closure set for June 30, 2025, as advertising revenue did not increase during its three years on air. No decision was made on its post-June programming. An agreement with J:COM was reached on June 18, with the channel continuing past the closure date and being renamed J:COM BS. As consequence, Shochiku sold its shares to the new partner.
