= Kōtarō Tanaka (actor) =

Japanese actor (born 1964)

- 田中 弘太郎
- Born: October 24, 1964 (age 62); Kanagawa Prefecture, Japan
- Occupation: Actor
- Years active: 1989–2005
- Height: 183 cm (6 ft 0 in)

Kōtarō Tanaka (田中 弘太郎, Tanaka Kōtarō; born October 24, 1964, in Kanagawa Prefecture, Japan) is a Japanese business executive and former actor known for Choujin Sentai Jetman, Spy Sorge and Yume no onna. He began his career in 1989, and retired from his career in entertainment in 2005. According to his Jetman co-star Toshihide Wakamatsu's blog, he has since worked in Information Technology.

== Filmography ==
=== Film ===
Year	Title	Role	Notes
1989	Bakayaro! 2 Awase ni Naritai		
	James Yama no Riran		
1993	Yume no onna		
2000	JUNK: Shiryou Kari	Toraji	Supporting Role
2001	Hyakujuu Sentai Gaoranger vs. Super Sentai	Red Hawk	Voice, Supporting Role
2003	Spy Sorge		(final film role)

=== TV series ===
Year	Title	Role	Network	Notes
1991	Choujin Sentai Jetman	Ryuu Tendou / Red Hawk	TV Asahi	Main Role
1991	Otona wa Wakattekure nai	Runner	TBS	
1994	Doyou Wide Gekijou (Nandemo ya Tantei-chou)		TV Asahi	
1994	Hana no Ran	Kenke Uehara	NHK	
1996	Kanryou-tachi no Natsu			NHK
1998	Taiyou ga Ippai	Sawada	Fuji Television	Supporting role
2000	Shijou Saiaku no Date		Nippon TV	
2001	Yo ni mo Kimyouna Monogatari		Fuji Television	
2003	The Monday Night Mystery Theater (Getsuyo Mystery Gekijou)/Zeirishi Kusunoki Ginpei no Jiken Choubo (episode 1)		TBS	
2005	Kinyou Entertainment/Hoshi ni Negai wo: Nanajoma de Umareta 410 man no Hoshi		Fuji Television	

=== Video ===
Year	Title	Role	Network	Notes
1989	Bakayaro! 2: Shiawase ni naritai		Shochiku	
1999	Junji Inagawa no Kyoufu Gekijou			
1996	Chushingura 1/47			

=== CM ===
- Nihon Keizai Shimbun
- English for you
- Mitsubishi Car Navigation System
- Sumitomo (S.H.I.) Construction Machinery
- Myojo Foods (Serial Ippei-chan)
