= Jo Ishiwatari =

Japanese actor (born 1967)

- Born: February 11, 1967 (age 58); Tokoyo, Japan
- Occupation: Actor

Jo Ishiwatari (石渡 譲, Ishiwatari Jō, born February 11, 1967) is a Japanese actor who is represented by the talent agency Anima.

== Filmography ==
=== Television ===
- Akai Himitsu (TBS, 1985)
- Keiji Monogatari '85 (1985)
- Thirteen Boy (1985)
- Shitetsu Ensen 97 Bunsho (episode 64) (1985)
- Choushinsei Flashman (TV Asahi, 1986 - 1987) - Bun / Blue Flash
- Tsuukai! Fukei Kouhosei yarukkyanai Mon! (TV Asahi, 1987)
- Saturday Wide Gekijou "Fuji Sanroku Satsujin Jiken" (TV Asahi, 1987)
- Hikari Sentai Maskman (TV Asahi, 1987) - Hikari (Guron Doggler)
- Tsubasa wo kudasai (NHK, 1988)
- Choujin Sentai Jetman (TV Asahi, 1991) - Back Dimension Dimension Soldiers Ray

=== Film ===
- Choushinsei Flashman (Toei, 1986) - Bun / Blue Flash
- Kisuyori Kantan (Toei Classics, 1989) - Suzunari
- Zansatsu seyo: Setsuna kimono, Sore wa Ai (Toei Classics, 1990)
- Uteba kagerou (Toei, 1991)
- Funky Monkey Teacher (Pony Canyon, 1992)

=== Anime ===
- Kanojo 2 (Asmik, 1990)
- Gokudou Monogatari: Hanachou Ikka Yondaime (Kasakura Publications, 1994)
- Janki 3: Chigai Houken Maajan (Tokuma Japan Communications, 1994)
