= Choujyu Sentai Liveman =

1988 Japanese television series

- The first title card for Choujyu Sentai Liveman
- Genre: Tokusatsu; Superhero fiction Science fiction Adventure; Drama
- Created by: Toei Company
- Developed by: Hirohisa Soda
- Directed by: Takao Nagaishi; Minoru Yamada; Shouhei Toujou
- Starring: Daisuke Shima; Kazuhiko Nishimura; Megumi Mori; Seirou Yamaguchi; Jin Kawamoto; Jouji Nakata; Yutaka Hirose; Akiko Amamatsuri; Toru Sakai; Yoshinori Okamoto
- Narrated by: Takeshi Kuwabara
- Composer: Tatsumi Yano
- Country of origin: Japan
- No. of episodes: 49 (list of episodes)

Production
- Producers: Takeyuki Suzuki; Kyōzō Utsunomiya
- Running time: 25 minutes
- Production companies: TV Asahi; Toei Company; Toei Advertising

Original release
- Network: ANN (TV Asahi)
- Release: February 27, 1988 – February 18, 1989

Related
- Hikari Sentai Maskman; Kousoku Sentai Turboranger

Choujyu Sentai Liveman (超獣戦隊ライブマン, Chōjū Sentai Raibuman; Super Beast Squadron Liveman) is a Japanese television tokusatsu series broadcast by TV Asahi. The series is the 12th installment of Super Sentai. Directed by Takao Nagaishi, Minoru Yamada and Shouhei Toujou, it stars Daisuke Shima, Kazuhiko Nishimura, Megumi Mori, Seirou Yamaguchi, Jin Kawamoto, Jouji Nakata, Yutaka Hirose, Akiko Amamatsuri, Toru Sakai and Yoshinori Okamoto. It aired from February 27, 1988 to February 18, 1989, replacing Hikari Sentai Maskman and was replaced by Kousoku Sentai Turboranger. Its international English title as listed by Toei is simply Liveman.

== Plot ==
Science Academia is an elite school that various genius students from across the globe attend. Among them are Yusuke Amamiya, Joh Ohara and Megumi Misaki who with Takuji Yano and Mari Aikawa sought to create a suit strong enough for space exploration. However, three of their classmates and friends Kenji Tsukigata, Rui Senda, and Goh Omura felt their talents were being wasted and leave to join an evil organization called Volt who offers to raise their full scientific potential.

In 1988, the present day, with Kenji, Rui, and Goh now known as Doctors Kemp, Mazenda and Obular, Volt begins its attack by devastating Science Academia. As a result, Yusuke, Joh, and Megumi take up the suits they created and become the Livemen to battle against their former classmates and Volt.

== Characters ==
=== Science Academia ===
Science Academia (科学アカデミア, Kagaku Akademia)

==== Livemen ====
The eponymous Livemen utilize two-piece Twin Braces (ツインブレス, Tsuin Buresu) to transform. While transformed, each member carries a Liblaster (ライブラスター, Raiburasutā) sidearm, which can switch between Gun Mode (ガンモード, Gan Mōdo) and Sword Mode (ソードモード, Sōdo Mōdo). They can also use the Biomotion Buster (バイモーションバスター, Baimōshon Basutā) cannon to destroy human-sized Brain Beasts. Their special team attack is the Spark Attack (スパークアタック, Supāku Atakku).

The primary members composed of Yusuke, Joh, and Megumi ride Moto Machine (モトマシン, Moto Mashin) motorcycles for transportation. When facing enlarged Brain Beasts, they combine their personal mecha to form Live Robo (ライブロボ, Raibu Robo). Later in the series, Yusuke and Joh acquire new personal weapons that can combine with Megumi's to form the Triple Bazooka (トリプルバズーカ, Toripuru Bazūka).

The secondary members composed of Tetsuya and Junichi ride the Live Cougar (ライブクーガー, Raibu Kūgā) four-wheel-drive for transportation. When facing enlarged Brain Beasts, they combine their personal mecha to form Live Boxer (ライブボクサー, Raibu Bokusā), which can further combine with Live Robo to form Super Live Robo (スーパーライブロボ, Sūpā Raibu Robo).

Yusuke Amamiya (天宮 勇介, Amamiya Yūsuke)/Red Falcon (レッドファルコン, Reddo Farukon)
A poor student at Academia, but a strong leader and quick at thinking under pressure. He is a brave hard worker and enjoys rock music and work outs. Initially starts as a hot-headed and sarcastic rebel, but grows into the role of dependable leader as the series progresses. Yusuke was once in love with Rui Senda, but she did not return his love. He was good friends with Kenji during their first year or so at Science Academia until things went sour between them once Kenji started down a dark path.

In the crossover film Hyakujuu Sentai Gaoranger vs. Super Sentai, Yusuke is found visiting the graves of Takuji Yano, Rui Senda, Kenji Tsukigata, and Mari Aikawa. He briefly dueled Gao Yellow in a sword fight and then lectured Gaku on the many sword-wielding warriors of the Super Sentai franchise, and introduced the Gaorangers to all 23 other Red Warriors. He performed his roll call twice in that special, one along with the Dream Sentai and Gaorangers and then again with the other Red Warriors.

As Red Falcon, Yusuke initially wielded the Falcon Sword (ファルコンソード, Farukon Sōdo) before it was replaced by the Falcon Saber (ファルコンセイバー, Farukon Seibā). He also pilots the Jet Falcon (ジェットファルコン, Jetto Farukon) mecha, which forms the head, back, hips, and upper legs of Live Robo.

Joh Ohara (大原 丈, Ōhara Jō)/Yellow Lion (イエローライオン, Ierō Raion)
He is at the bottom of the class at Academia and a sportsman and skateboarder. He is short-tempered and ready to dive into danger. Joh has the strength to back up his actions. He was once good friends with Goh and was heartbroken when their friendship dissolved once the weak-willed Goh fell into a bad crowd.

In Kaizoku Sentai Gokaiger, Joh would appear to the Gokaigers and grant them the Great Power of Liveman, which is Super Live Robo.

As Yellow Lion, Joh initially wielded the Lion Punch (ライオンパンチ, Raion Panchi) gauntlet before it was replaced by the Lion Bazooka (ライオンバズーカ, Raion Bazūka). He also pilots the Land Lion (ランドライオン, Rando Raion) mecha, which forms the chest and arms of Live Robo.

Megumi Misaki (岬 めぐみ, Misaki Megumi)/Blue Dolphin (ブルードルフィン, Burū Dorufin)
A top class student at Academia who was nonetheless friends with Yusuke and Joh and did powered suit research with them and the late Takuji Yano and Mari Aikawa. She is good at swimming and bicycling and was taught archery by her father. Megumi often criticizes Yuusuke's strategies. A caring figure, feeling even for her enemies.

As Blue Dolphin, Megumi wields the Dolphin Arrow (ドルフィンアロー, Dorufin Arō) bow. She also pilots the Aqua Dolphin (アクアドルフィン, Akua Dorufin) mecha, which forms the lower legs of Live Robo.

Tetsuya Yano (矢野 鉄也, Yano Tetsuya)/Black Bison (ブラックバイソン, Burakku Baison)
The younger brother of Takuji and older brother of Takeshi. He is good at boxing. He nearly destroyed the Gran Tortoise after being taken over by Volt. Tetsuya is generally a good-hearted person, but has a temper and hatred, mostly fueled by his desire for revenge on Kemp for the murder of his older brother.

As Black Bison, Tetsuya wields the Bison Rod (バイソンロッド, Baison Roddo) staff. He also pilots the Bison Liner (バイソンライナー, Baison Rainā) mecha, which forms the head, body, arms, and left foot of Live Boxer.

Junichi Aikawa (相川 純一, Aikawa Jun'ichi)/Green Rhino (グリーンサイ, Gurīn Sai)
The younger brother of Mari and a rugby player. He calls Tetsuya "Tetsu-chan", looking up to him as an older brother. The youngest member of the team, temporarily leaving high school in order to fight Volt. While impregnated by Vega Zuno, Junichi was fearful of the life inside him to the point of getting an abortion until the unborn Vega Baby pleas for its life and Junichi decides to "give birth," only to lose the child when it was killed by its biological parent and ended up getting a newfound respect for mothers.

As Green Rhino, Junichi dual wields the twin Rhino Cutter (サイカッター, Sai Kattā) boomerangs. He also pilots the Rhino Fire (サイファイヤー, Sai Faiyā) mecha, which forms the legs and right foot of Live Boxer.

==== Allies ====
- Doctor Hoshi (星博士, Hoshi-hakase): The principal of Science Academia who made the Gran Tortoise and gave the Livemen mecha the ability to combine before dying. He died helping a pregnant woman trapped in the rubble of Science Academia's escape.
- Colon (コロン, Koron): A female robot built by Doctor Hoshi to be in charge of the Gran Tortoise and assist the team.
- Takuji Yano (矢野 卓二, Yano Takuji): A Science Academia student studying on the power suits for space travel with Yusuke, Joh, Megumi, and Mari. The older brother of Tetsuya and Takeshi. His prototype power suit featured a swallow.
- Mari Aikawa (相川 麻理, Aikawa Mari): A Science Academia student studying on the power suits for space travel with Yusuke, Joh, Megumi, and Takuji. The older sister of Junichi. Her suit featured a dog.
- Doctor Dorothee (ドロテ博士, Dorote-hakase): Tetsuya and Junichi's benefactor, the leader of the Science Academia group that built the Bison Liner and the Sai Fire. She later arrives to help the Livemen by providing a new power core for the Bison Liner. She was played by French children entertainer Dorothée.

==== Relatives ====
- Takeshi Yano (矢野 武志, Yano Takeshi): The younger brother of Takuji and Tetsuya, he met Yusuke and the others before Takuji was killed by Volt. He helps Yusuke complete the Live Cougar vehicle, which Yusuke started to build with Takuji.
- Toshiko Omura (尾村 俊子, Omura Toshiko): Go's mother. When Go was young, Toshiko pressured her son into succeeding academically at the expense of giving him a normal childhood.
- Yoichiro Misaki (岬 与一郎, Misaki Yoichirō): Megumi's father. A master of a form of archery known as the Higo Cross style (肥後バッテン流, Higo Batten Ryū). He goes to Tokyo to visit his daughter with the intention of pairing her with a potential marriage partner. He becomes proud of his daughter when he sees her use the Dolphin Arrow.
- Mai Funachi (舟地 マイ, Funachi Mai): A long-time friend of Yusuke who works as a day-care worker in a kindergarten, who also knew Kenji before he became Doctor Kemp.

=== Armed Brain Volt Army ===
Believing most of humanity to be inferior, the Armed Brain Volt Army (武装頭脳軍ボルト, Busō Zunō Gun Boruto) is based on the orbiting space station Zuno Base (ヅノーベース, Zunōbēsu) with its officers using a triangular shuttle to journey between it and Earth.

- Great Professor Bias (大教授ビアス, Daikyōju Biasu): A super genius scientist whose appearance belies his actual age, well versed in all knowledge, and worshiped as a god by his officers.
- Kenji Tsukigata/Doctor Kemp (月形 剣史/ドクター・ケンプ, Tsukigata Kenji/Dokutā Kenpu): Yusuke's former friend at Academia whose dream was to develop biotechnological means to make humans immune to any disease. However, Kenji became egotistical and power-hungry after taking the test Bias sent to him, killing Takuji and Mari while leaving to join Volt.
- Rui Senda/Doctor Mazenda (仙田 ルイ/ドクター・マゼンダ, Senda Rui/Dokutā Mazenda): A haughty woman who was Megumi's rival at Science Academia and broke Yusuke's heart. Rui reconstructs herself as a cyborg to reflect her coldness and her desire to preserve her beauty, with concealed weapons within her robotic body like the Arm Gun, Elbow Gun, and Finger Gun.
- Goh Omura/Doctor Obular (尾村 豪/ドクター・オブラー, Omura Gō/Dokutā Oburā): Joh's one-time friend at Science Academia. Goh is a childhood prodigy who uses Volt's research with his inferiority complex as a motivation to turn himself into a completely inhuman monster, called Monster Obular (獣人オブラー, Kaijin Oburā); in this state, he uses a battle axe as his weapon.
- Arashi Busujima/Doctor Ashura (毒島 嵐/ドクター・アシュラ, Busujima Arashi/Dokutā Ashura): A tough-as-nails underworld figure and gang leader with a poor education who bears a grudge against the Science Academia and those smarter than he is.
- Guardnoid Gash (ガードノイド・ガッシュ, Gādonoido Gasshu): Bias's robot bodyguard, a relentless machine who has knowledge of firearms and uses his Video Eye to locate targets.
- Guildian Guildos (ギルド星人ギルドス, Girudo Seijin Girudosu): A robot secretly built by Bias to spur his scientists to break their limitations, believing himself to be an alien intelligence from the planet Guildo.
- Chibuchian Butchy (チブチ星人ブッチー, Chibuchi Seijin Butchī): An orange ape-like robot secretly built by Bias to spur on Kemp et al.
- Jinmmers (ジンマー, Jinmā): The green-skinned android soldiers with mohawk 'haircuts'. They are very difficult to defeat, as their head and limbs operate independently when dismembered.

==== Brain Beasts ====
The Brain Beasts (頭脳獣, Zunōjū) are experimental lifeforms created by Guardnoid Gash who combined a brain core with a random object and chaos energy. Each one is used by either Guardnoid or one of the other Armed Brain Volt Army members. To make a Brain Beast grow, Guardnoid Gash would fire the Giga Phantom at them.

===== Guardnoid Gash's Brain Beasts =====
The following Brain Beasts were used by Guardnoid Gash:

- Disconnect Brain (バラバラヅノー, Barabara Zunō): A Brain Beast covered in smaller creatures.
- Fire Brain (ファイヤーヅノー, Faiyā Zunō): A pyrokinetic Brain Beast with dragon heads instead of hands.

===== Doctor Oblar's Brain Beasts =====
The following Brain Beasts were used by Doctor Oblar:

- Virus Brain (ウイルスヅノー, Uirusu Zunō): A syringe-themed Brain Beast.
- Time Brain (タイムヅノー, Taimu Zunō): A chronokinetic clock-themed Brain Beast created by Doctor Obular from the contents of his Time Chaos Capsule.
- Baboon Brain (ヒヒヅノー, Hihi Zunō): A baboon-themed Brain Beast created by Doctor Obular whose bite from the large jaw he has in place of his right hand can turn anyone into Ape-Men.
- Plasma Brain (プラズマヅノー, Purazuma Zunō): A Jiangshi-themed Brain Beast used by Doctor Obular.
- Study Brain (ベンキョウヅノー, Benkyo Zunō): A brain-themed Brain beast created by Doctor Obular from his own brain.

===== Doctor Mazenda's Brain Beasts =====
The following Brain Beasts were used by Doctor Mazenda:

- Transmission Brain (デンソーヅノー, Densō Zunō): A transmission device-themed Brain Beast.
- Tank Brain (タンクヅノー, Tanku Zunō): An oil tank/octopus-themed Brain Beast created by Doctor Mazenda.
- Poison Gas Brain (ドクガスヅノー, Dokugasu Zunō): A barnacle-themed Brain Beast that emits toxic gas upon eating garbage.
- Twin Brain (ツインヅノー, Tsuin Zunō): A twin-themed Brain Beast created by Doctor Mazenda from her DNA sample that contains the love aspect and posed as Rui Senda's twin sister.
- Pig Brain (ブタヅノー, Buta Zunō): A pig-themed Brain Beast.
- Light Brain (ヒカリヅノー, Hikari Zunō): An electric light-themed Brain Beast.
- Robo Brain (ロボヅノー, Robo Zunō): A Brain Beast created by Doctor Mazenda using the blueprints to Tetsuya's robot suit.
- Armor Brain (ヨロイヅノー, Yoroi Zunō): A turtle-themed Brain Beast.
- Wolf Brain (ウルフヅノー, Urufu Zunō): A wolf-themed Brain Beast created by Doctor Mazenda.
- Space Brain (スペースヅノー, Supēsu Zunō): An alien-themed Brain Beast with a hammer gun for a right hand that lives in the gem that's associated with it.
- Nightmare Brain (アクムヅノー, Akumu Zunō): A Chimera-themed Brain Beast who was created by Doctor Mazenda in her dream machine as the combined form of Transmission Brain, Test Brain, Gal Brain, and Meteor Brain after getting an inspiration from a dream she had of defeating the Livemen. When Gou revealed to Doctor Mazenda that Great Professor Bias and Guardnoid Gash were about to kill her, Doctor Mazenda exited the dream machine causing Nightmare Brain and the Ghost Brains that make up him to vanish.

===== Doctor Kemp's Brain Beasts =====
The following Brain Beasts were used by Doctor Kemp:

- Engine Brain (エンジンヅノー, Enjin Zunō): A vehicle-possessing engine-themed Brain Beast created by Doctor Kemp.
- Anger Brain (イカリヅノー, Ikari Zunō): An Oni-themed Brain Beast created by Guardnoid Gash for Doctor Kemp from the harvested rage of humans.
- Maze Brain (メイロヅノー, Meiro Zunō): A maze-making Brain Beast whose vehicle form can manipulate time-space.
- Pierrot Brain (ピエロヅノー, Piero Zunō): A pierrot-themed Brain Beast created by Doctor Kemp from a pierrot doll.
- Obular Brain (オブラーヅノー, Oburā Zunō): A demon-themed Brain Beast who was a clone of Doctor Obular.
- Sword Brain (ケンヅノー, Ken Zunō): An armored samurai-themed Brain Beast that wields a Giga Metal sword.
- Gore Brain (ゴアヅノー, Goa Zunō): A blood-sucking Brain Beast created by Doctor Kemp from his own blood.
- Guild Brain (ギルヅノー, Giru Zunō): A hidden weapon-themed Brain Beast with a blade for a right arm and a gun for a left arm.
- Shark Brain (サメヅノー, Samezunō): A shark-themed Brain Beast.
- Invisible Brain (トウメイヅノー, Toumei Zunō): A crystal-themed Brain Beast created by Doctor Kemp who can turn invisible.
- Battle Brain (バトルヅノー, Batoru Zunō): A Brain Beast created by Doctor Kemp who can create weapons by absorbing attacks.

===== Doctor Ashura's Brain Beasts =====
The following Brain Beasts were used by Doctor Ashura:

- Test Brain (テストヅノー, Tesuto Zunō): A computer monitor-themed Brain Beast created by Doctor Ashura.
- Elec Brain (エレキヅノー, Ereki Zunō): An electrokinetic electric eel/plug-themed Brain Beast.
- Spirit Brain (レーヅノー, Rē Zunō): An Ochimusha-themed Brain Beast used by Doctor Ashura and wielded the Resurrection Sphere that enabled it to revive Virus Brain, Transmission Brain, Engine Brain, Time Brain, Tank Brain, Maze Brain, Baboon Brain, Test Brain, Poison Gas Brain, Fire Brain, Plasma Brain, Pierrot Brain, Twin Brain, Regeneration Brain, Guitar Brain, and Sword Brain.
- Hacker Brain (ハッカーヅノー, Hakkā Zunō): A hacker-themed Brain Beast.

===== Guildian Guildos and Chibuchian Butchy's Brain Beasts =====
The following Brain Beasts were used by Guildian Guildos and Chibuchian Butchy:

- Regeneration Brain (サイセイヅノー, Saisei Zunō): A Brain Beast with regenerative abilities who was created by Guildian Guildos.
- Guitar Brain (ギターラヅノー, Gitāra Zunō): A guitarist-themed Brain Beast created by Chibuchian Butchy.
- Earthquake Brain (ジシンヅノー, Jishin Zunō): A seismic-generating excavator-themed Brain Beast used by Guildian Guildos and Chibuchian Butchy.
- Vega Brain (ベガヅノー, Bega Zunō): A carnivorous plant-themed Brain Beast created by Guildian Guildos and Chibuchian Butchy from a lifeform they found on the planet Vega.
- Meteor Brain (インセキヅノー, Inseki Zunō): A meteorite-themed Brain Beast with a burning face that was created by Guildian Guildos and Chibuchian Butchy from a meteor fragment.
- Guildo Brain (ギルードヅノー, Girūdo Zunō): An unspecified reptile-themed Brain Beast created by Guidian Guildos.
- Reckless Brain (ボウソウズノ, Bousou Zuno): A engine-themed Brain Beast in roller skates who accompanied Chibuchian Butchy in his attack on the city.

===== Great Professor Bias' Brain Beasts =====
The following Brain Beasts were used by Great Professor Bias:

- Gal Brain (ガルヅノー, Garu Zunō): A baboon-themed Brain Beast summoned by Great Professor Bias.
- Bomber Brain (ボンバーヅノー, Bonbā Zunō): A bomb-themed Brain Beast created by Great Professor Bias.
- Electron Brain (デンシヅノー, Denshi Zunō): An electron-themed Brain Beast created by Great Professor Bias.

=== Others ===
- Dinosaur Gon (恐竜ゴン, Kyōryū Gon): A dinosaur that Time Brain brought to the present, Gon was befriended by a boy named Kenichii.
- Giga Volt (ギガボルト, Gigaboruto): Created by Bias as the result of his Giga Project, using the Giga Metal that Kemp synthesized and powered by the Giga Energy developed by Mazenda from geothermic heat to build this giant robot personally. Once finally activated, this robot emerges with Kemp piloting it.

== Episodes ==
| No. | Title | Directed by | Written by | Original release date | Rating |
|---|---|---|---|---|---|
| 1 | "Friends! Why Did You Do This!?"; Transliteration: "Tomo yo Kimitachi wa Naze!?" (Japanese: 友よ君達はなぜ!?) | Takao Nagaishi | Hirohisa Soda | February 27, 1988 | 12.1 |
Science Academia is an island for science students. The students staying at Science Academia were hand-picked from all over the world by the United Nations. They are studying under Doctor Hoshi to make a better future for Earth, and were chosen to work on a special project. The academia is constructing a satellite that will become the first outer space science base. Here the academia's youthful dream was aflame.
| 2 | "Three Powers Sworn to Life"; Transliteration: "Inochi ni Chikau Mittsu no Chikara" (Japanese: 命に誓う三つの力) | Takao Nagaishi | Hirohisa Soda | March 5, 1988 | 12.1 |
Hurry. Doctor Hoshi has built a secret base deep under the cape of hope. But then Gush creates a Brain Beast.
| 3 | "Obler Demonic Transformation"; Transliteration: "Oburā Akuma Henshin" (Japanese: オブラー悪魔変身) | Takao Nagaishi | Hirohisa Soda | March 12, 1988 | 11.6 |
Using Virus Brain, Go Omura starts an experiment to alter his body entirely. Jo bursts into a blazing rage after being betrayed by Go who he tried to save.
| 4 | "Exposure of the Dummy Man"; Transliteration: "Abake! Damī Man" (Japanese: 暴け! ダミーマン) | Minoru Yamada | Hirohisa Soda | March 19, 1988 | 10.0 |
The Jinmers are taking on human forms and causing panic in the city. Megumi, who discovers Mazenda's plan, runs to the rescue.
| 5 | "The Joy Riding Engine Monster"; Transliteration: "Bōsō Enjin Kaijū" (Japanese: 暴走エンジン怪獣) | Minoru Yamada | Hirohisa Soda | March 26, 1988 | 8.7 |
Yusuke tries to make a cruiser with plans his friend Takuji left behind. But that cruiser has been carjacked by Engine Brain.
| 6 | "Invasion of the Living Dinosaur!"; Transliteration: "Shūrai! Ikita Kyōryū" (Japanese: 襲来! 生きた恐竜) | Shouhei Toujou | Hirohisa Soda | April 2, 1988 | 8.1 |
Obler created Time Brain, able to bend space and time. As a result, a dinosaur has been brought to live in our time.
| 7 | "Dinosaur VS Live Robo"; Transliteration: "Kyōryū VS Raibu Robo" (Japanese: 恐竜VSライブロボ) | Shouhei Toujou | Hirohisa Soda | April 9, 1988 | 10.7 |
Gon starts to realize he is carnivorous and attacked pigs. On top of that he's being controlled and turned into a giant. Gon is attacking Live Robo.
| 8 | "The Duel of Love and Anger!"; Transliteration: "Ai to Ikari no Kettō!" (Japanese: 愛と怒りの決闘!) | Takao Nagaishi | Kunio Fujī | April 16, 1988 | 8.7 |
Rage Brain absorbs anger chaos and takes away people's fighting spirit. The Livemen are no exception. Get a grip of yourselves, Livemen!
| 9 | "Rose! Smell Feverish"; Transliteration: "Bara yo Atsuku Kaore!" (Japanese: バラよ熱く香れ!) | Takao Nagaishi | Toshiki Inoue | April 23, 1988 | 11.3 |
Mazenda created Tank Brain whose perfume can control men's minds and is using them as slaves.
| 10 | "The Skateboard to Escape the Maze"; Transliteration: "Sukebō Meiro Yaburi" (Japanese: スケボー迷路破り) | Minoru Yamada | Hirohisa Soda | April 30, 1988 | 9.1 |
Kyoko and Shinya are siblings who own a pizzeria. Jo has become a skateboard delivery boy for them but suddenly the city has become a huge labyrinth.
| 11 | "The Man Who Bit a Brain Beast"; Transliteration: "Zunōjū o Kanda Otoko" (Japanese: 頭脳獣を噛んだ男) | Minoru Yamada | Hirohisa Soda | May 7, 1988 | 14.6 |
There was a man capable of controlling a Brain Beast. Arashi, an underground gang leader, saves the Livemen from Baboon Brain who could turn humans into ape men.
| 12 | "Super-Genius Ashura!"; Transliteration: "Chō Tensai Ashura!" (Japanese: 超天才アシュラ!) | Shouhei Toujou | Hirohisa Soda | May 14, 1988 | 10.9 |
| 13 | "Burn! Steel Colon"; Transliteration: "Moeyo Kōtetsu Koron" (Japanese: 燃えよ鋼鉄コロン) | Shouhei Toujou | Hirohisa Soda | May 21, 1988 | 11.5 |
| 14 | "The Scream of Kettle-Man Yusuke"; Transliteration: "Nabe Otoko Yūsuke no Sakebi" (Japanese: ナベ男勇介の叫び) | Takao Nagaishi | Hirohisa Soda | May 28, 1988 | 10.4 |
| 15 | "Deadly! Grim Reaper Gash"; Transliteration: "Hissatsu! Shinigami Gasshu" (Japanese: 必殺! 死神ガッシュ) | Shouhei Toujou | Toshiki Inoue | June 4, 1988 | 10.7 |
| 16 | "The Letter of Jiang Shi"; Transliteration: "Kyonshī no Tegami" (Japanese: キョンシーの手紙) | Takao Nagaishi | Hirohisa Soda | June 11, 1988 | 11.2 |
| 17 | "The Crying Doll! The Attacking Doll!"; Transliteration: "Naku Ningyō! Osou Ningyō!" (Japanese: 泣く人形! 襲う人形!) | Shouhei Toujou | Kunio Fujī | June 18, 1988 | 11.9 |
| 18 | "A Trap! Joh's Beloved Brain Beast"; Transliteration: "Wana! Jō no Ai Shita Zunōjū" (Japanese: 罠! 丈の愛した頭脳獣) | Takao Nagaishi | Kunio Fujī | June 25, 1988 | 13.0 |
| 19 | "Geek-Boy Obular"; Transliteration: "Gariben Bōya Oburā" (Japanese: ガリ勉坊やオブラー) | Takao Nagaishi | Hirohisa Soda | July 2, 1988 | 8.9 |
| 20 | "Failing Obular's Counterattack!"; Transliteration: "Rakudai Oburā no Gyakushū!" (Japanese: 落第オブラーの逆襲!) | Shouhei Toujou | Hirohisa Soda | July 9, 1988 | 7.2 |
| 21 | "Listen, Gou!! Mother's Voice…"; Transliteration: "Gō yo Kike! Haha no Koe o..." (Japanese: 豪よ聞け! 母の声を…) | Shouhei Toujou | Hirohisa Soda | July 16, 1988 | 8.7 |
| 22 | "Enter the Space Karaoke Master"; Transliteration: "Uchū Karaoke Meijin Tōjō" (Japanese: 宇宙カラオケ名人登場) | Takao Nagaishi | Hirohisa Soda | July 23, 1988 | 9.2 |
| 23 | "The Life Risked at 0.1 Second"; Transliteration: "Konma Ichibyō ni Kaketa Inochi" (Japanese: コンマ1秒に賭けた命) | Takao Nagaishi | Hirohisa Soda | July 30, 1988 | 8.1 |
| 24 | "Can You Get a 100 for Playing!?"; Transliteration: "Asonde Hyakuten ga Toreru!?" (Japanese: 遊んで百点が取れる!?) | Shouhei Toujou | Kunio Fujī | August 6, 1988 | 8.2 |
| 25 | "The 8 Brain Beasts of Tsuruga Castle!"; Transliteration: "Tsurugajō no Hachidai Zunōjū!" (Japanese: 鶴ケ城の8大頭脳獣!) | Takao Nagaishi | Hirohisa Soda | August 13, 1988 | 6.6 |
| 26 | "Aizu's Huge Rhinoceros Beetles!"; Transliteration: "Aizu no Kyodai Kabutomushi!" (Japanese: 会津の巨大カブト虫!) | Takao Nagaishi | Hirohisa Soda | August 20, 1988 | 10.0 |
| 27 | "Daughter!! Destroy the Giga Project"; Transliteration: "Musume yo! Giga Keikaku o Ite" (Japanese: 娘よ! ギガ計画を射て) | Shouhei Toujou | Hirohisa Soda | August 27, 1988 | 8.9 |
| 28 | "The Challenge of the Huge Giga Volt"; Transliteration: "Kyodai Gigaboruto no Chōsen?" (Japanese: 巨大ギガボルトの挑戦) | Takao Nagaishi | Hirohisa Soda | September 3, 1988 | 8.1 |
| 29 | "The Vengeful Live Boxer"; Transliteration: "Fukushū no Raibu Bokusā" (Japanese: 復讐のライブボクサー) | Takao Nagaishi | Hirohisa Soda | September 10, 1988 | 9.5 |
| 30 | "Five Warriors, Here and Now"; Transliteration: "Ima Koko ni Gonin no Senshi ga" (Japanese: 今ここに5人の戦士が) | Takao Nagaishi | Hirohisa Soda | September 17, 1988 | 9.0 |
| 31 | "Mama! The Parasitic Monster's Cries"; Transliteration: "Mama! Kisei Kaibutsu no Sakebi" (Japanese: ママ! 寄生怪物の叫び) | Shouhei Toujou | Hirohisa Soda | September 24, 1988 | 11.9 |
| 32 | "Kemp, The Riddle of Blood and Roses"; Transliteration: "Kenpu, Chi to Bara no Nazo" (Japanese: ケンプ、血とバラの謎) | Shouhei Toujou | Kunio Fujī | October 1, 1988 (Note: Episode 32 aired at 5:30 PM JST to accommodate coverage of the 1988 Summer Olympics. The broadcast was interrupted with breaking news and subsequently rebroadcast on October 8, 1988.) | 6.1 |
| 33 | "Do Your Best, Tetsu-chan Robot"; Transliteration: "Ganbare Tetchan Robo" (Japanese: がんばれ鉄ちゃんロボ) | Takao Nagaishi | Hirohisa Soda | October 15, 1988 | 12.4 |
| 34 | "Love That Runs through the Future and Present!"; Transliteration: "Mirai to Ima o Kakeru Koi!" (Japanese: 未来と今を駆ける恋!) | Takao Nagaishi | Kunio Fujī | October 22, 1988 | 12.2 |
| 35 | "Yusuke and Kemp's Promise!!"; Transliteration: "Yūsuke to Kenpu no Yakusoku!!" (Japanese: 勇介とケンプの約束!!) | Shouhei Toujou | Kunio Fujī | October 29, 1988 | 11.4 |
| 36 | "Crash! The Tackle of Friendship"; Transliteration: "Gekitotsu! Yūjō no Takkuru" (Japanese: 激突! 友情のタックル) | Shouhei Toujou | Toshiki Inoue | November 5, 1988 | 10.0 |
| 37 | "16-Year-Old Kemp's Fear Beast Transformation!"; Transliteration: "Jūrokusai Kenpu Kyōjū Henshin!" (Japanese: 16才ケンプ恐獣変身!) | Takao Nagaishi | Hirohisa Soda | November 12, 1988 | 10.9 |
| 38 | "Mobile Weapon of Destruction Mazenda"; Transliteration: "Ugoku Hakai Heiki Mazenda" (Japanese: 動く破壊兵器マゼンダ) | Takao Nagaishi | Hirohisa Soda | November 19, 1988 | 13.6 |
| 39 | "Protect it! A Lifeform of Space"; Transliteration: "Mamore! Uchū no Hitotsubu no Inochi" (Japanese: 守れ! 宇宙の一粒の命) | Shouhei Toujou | Kunio Fujī | November 26, 1988 | 13.8 |
| 40 | "Love!? Megumi and the Jewel Thief"; Transliteration: "Koi!? Megumi to Hōseki Dorobō" (Japanese: 恋!? めぐみと宝石泥棒) | Shouhei Toujou | Toshiki Inoue | December 3, 1988 | 12.7 |
| 41 | "The Confession of Gou, The Invisible Man!!"; Transliteration: "Tōmei Ningen, Gō no Kokuhaku!!" (Japanese: 透明人間、豪の告白!!) | Takao Nagaishi | Hirohisa Soda | December 10, 1988 | 10.8 |
| 42 | "Bias' Challenge From Space"; Transliteration: "Biasu Uchū Kara no Chōsen" (Japanese: ビアス宇宙からの挑戦) | Takao Nagaishi | Hirohisa Soda | December 17, 1988 | 10.7 |
| 43 | "A Mystery!? Guildos' Final Form"; Transliteration: "Kai!? Girudosu Saigo no Sugata" (Japanese: 怪!? ギルドス最期の姿) | Shouhei Toujou | Hirohisa Soda | December 24, 1988 | 10.4 |
| 44 | "Butchy's Great Reckless Driving of Tears!!"; Transliteration: "Butchī Namida no Dai Bōsō!!" (Japanese: ブッチー涙の大暴走!!) | Shouhei Toujou | Hirohisa Soda | January 14, 1989 (Note: Episode 44, the first Heisei period episode, was delayed from January 7 to January 14, 1989 as a result of all programming being cancelled following the death of Emperor Hirohito.) | 11.3 |
| 45 | "Ashura Reversal One Chance Game"; Transliteration: "Ashura Gyakuten Ippatsu Shōbu" (Japanese: アシュラ逆転一発勝負) | Takao Nagaishi | Hirohisa Soda | January 21, 1989 | 11.2 |
| 46 | "Honorable Man, Arashi! The Final Battle"; Transliteration: "Otoko Arashi! Saigo no Tatakai" (Japanese: オトコ嵐! 最後の戦い) | Takao Nagaishi | Hirohisa Soda | January 28, 1989 | 12.3 |
| 47 | "A 1000-Point Brain! Mazenda!!"; Transliteration: "Senten Zunō! Mazenda!!" (Japanese: 千点頭脳! マゼンダ!!) | Shouhei Toujou | Hirohisa Soda | February 4, 1989 | 10.2 |
| 48 | "Birth!! Boy King Bias!"; Transliteration: "Tanjō!! Shōnen Ō Biasu!" (Japanese: 誕生!! 少年王ビアス!) | Shouhei Toujou | Hirohisa Soda | February 11, 1989 | 10.6 |
| 49 | "The Fall of Great Professor Bias"; Transliteration: "Daikyōju Biasu no Hōkai" (Japanese: 大教授ビアスの崩壊!!) | Shouhei Toujou | Hirohisa Soda | February 18, 1989 | 11.3 |

== Cast ==
- Yusuke Amamiya: Daisuke Shima (嶋 大輔, Shima Daisuke)
- Joh Ohara: Kazuhiko Nishimura (西村 和彦, Nishimura Kazuhiko)
- Megumi Misaki: Megumi Mori (森 恵, Mori Megumi)
- Tetsuya Yano: Seiro Yamaguchi (山口 正朗, Yamaguchi Seirō)
- Junichi Aikawa: Jin Kawamoto (河本 忍, Kawamoto Jin)
- Great Professor Bias: Jōji Nakata (中田 譲治, Nakata Jōji)
- Kenji Tsukigata/Doctor Kemp: Yutaka Hirose (広瀬 裕, Hirose Yutaka) (credited as Takumi Hirose (広瀬 匠, Hirose Takumi))
- Rui Senda/Doctor Mazenda: Akiko Amamatsuri (天祭 揚子, Amamatsuri Akiko) (credited as Akiko Kurusu (来栖 明子, Kurusu Akiko))
- Goh Omura/Doctor Obler: Toru Sakai (坂井 徹, Sakai Tōru)
- Arashi Busujima/Doctor Ashura: Yoshinori Okamoto (岡本 美登, Okamoto Yoshinori)

=== Guest stars ===
- Doctor Hoshi: Daisuke Ban (伴 大介, Ban Daisuke) (credited as Naoya Ban (伴 直弥, Ban Naoya)) (1–2)
- Takuji Yano: Hiromichi Hori (堀広道, Hori Hiromichi) (1, 5, 8, 29–30)
- Mari Aikawa: Masae Hayashi (林優枝, Hayashi Masae) (1, 8, 29–30)
- Takeshi Yano: Hirofumi Taga (多賀啓史, Taga Hirofumi) (5)
- Great Professor Bias (Child): Kentaro Ishizema (石関賢太郎, Ishizema Kentarō) (48–49)

=== Voice actors ===
- Colon: Makoto Kōsaka (高坂 真琴, Kōsaka Makoto)
- Beast Man Obler: Atsuo Mori (森 篤夫, Mori Atsuo)
- Guildos: Moichi Saito (斉藤 茂一, Saitō Moichi)
- Butchy: Takuzō Kamiyama (神山 卓三, Kamiyama Takuzō)
- Gash: Hideaki Kusaka (日下 秀昭, Kusaka Hideaki)
- Narrator: Takeshi Kuwabara (桑原 たけし, Kuwabara Takeshi)

== Songs ==
Opening theme

- "Choujyu Sentai Liveman" (超獣戦隊ライブマン, Chōjū Sentai Raibuman)
  - Lyrics: Akira Ohtsu (大津 あきら, Ōtsu Akira)
  - Composition: Yasuo Kosugi (小杉 保夫, Kosugi Yasuo)
  - Arrangement: Ohzuchi Fujita (藤田 大土, Fujita Ōzuchi)
  - Artist: Daisuke Shima

Ending theme

- "Ashita ni Ikiru ze!" (あしたに生きるぜ!; "Live to Tomorrow!")
  - Lyrics: Akira Ohtsu
  - Composition: Yasuo Kosugi
  - Arrangement: Ohzuchi Fujita
  - Artist: Daisuke Shima
