= Choushinsei Flashman =

1986 Japanese TV series

- Title Screen
- Genre: Tokusatsu; Superhero fiction Action; Adventure; Science fiction
- Created by: Toei Company
- Developed by: Hirohisa Soda
- Directed by: Minoru Yamada
- Starring: Touta Tarumi; Kihachirō Uemura; Yasuhiro Ishiwata; Youko Nakamura; Mayumi Yoshida; Koji Shimizu; Yutaka Hirose; Sayoko Hagiwara; Jouji Nakata
- Narrated by: Eiichi Onoda
- Composer: Kōhei Tanaka
- Country of origin: Japan
- No. of episodes: 50 (list of episodes)

Production
- Producers: Moriyoshi Katō; Takeyuki Suzuki
- Running time: 30 minutes
- Production companies: TV Asahi; Toei Company; Toei Advertising

Original release
- Network: ANN (TV Asahi)
- Release: 1 March 1986 – 21 February 1987

Related
- Dengeki Sentai Changeman; Hikari Sentai Maskman

Choushinsei Flashman (超新星フラッシュマン, Chōshinsei Furasshuman; Supernova Flashman) is a Japanese television tokusatsu series broadcast by TV Asahi. The series is the 10th installment of Super Sentai. Directed by Minoru Yamada, it stars Touta Tarumi, Kihachirō Uemura, Yasuhiro Ishiwata, Youko Nakamura, Mayumi Yoshida, Koji Shimizu, Yutaka Hirose, Sayoko Hagiwara and Jouji Nakata. It aired from March 1, 1986 to February 21, 1987, replacing Dengeki Sentai Changeman and was replaced by Hikari Sentai Maskman.

== Storyline ==
In 1966, five infants from Earth are abducted by an alien group known as the Alien Hunters on behalf of the Reconstructive Experiment Empire Mess, which seeks human subjects for experimentation. The children are rescued by Mess’s enemies, the Flash alien race, who take each child to a different planet within their solar system for training.

There, each is raised separately and trained in a range of superhuman abilities, with their bodies adapting to the planets’ environments and gaining unique powers. When they return to their birth planet, Earth in 1986, 20 years later, to confront Mess—now attempting to invade—they also take the opportunity to search for their biological parents.

== Characters ==
=== Flashmen ===
Raised in the harsh conditions of Planet Flash and its four moons, gaining powers in the Flash Star System, the eponymous Flashmen was brought up for the purpose of defeating Mess. The team can perform team attacks like the Combination Super Spear, a large energy spear created from the combined powers of the Flashmen.

- Jin (ジン, Jin)/Red Flash (レッドフラッシュ, Reddo Furasshu): He learned science on the desert planet Flash Star, gaining scientific mental powers and scientific knowledge including a wealth of knowledge dealing with machinery. Kidnapped from Earth at age 3, given a scar by an Alien Hunter in the process. Since he was the oldest of the five kidnapped, his memories about the kidnapping are the strongest, although still fuzzy. He is the strongest of the team and as the eldest, takes an older brother-like role, making him a strong leader. Red Flash would reappear again 15 years after the series ending in Gaoranger VS Super Sentai along with his 23 fellow Red Warriors led by Red Falcon, in which all 24 Red leaders performed their respective roll calls.
- Dai (ダイ, Dai)/Green Flash (グリーンフラッシュ, Gurīn Furasshu): He gained great strength training on the rocky Green Star, enduring the most physical pain compared to his teammates. He made friends with boxer Ryuu Wakakusa, who further trained him in his boxing abilities. He arms himself with brass knuckles. Although he has a cold exterior, he is actually a very warm and charming person. He has a weak spot for women and loves nature and ramen. He befriended the teenage Sumire, who had actually died some years back and had been contacting Dai through telepathy.
- Bun (ブン, Bun)/Blue Flash (ブルーフラッシュ, Burū Furasshu): He gained speed and agility on the deserts of the Blue Star planet. He learned survival skills on the harsh planet of Blue Star, such as surviving 30 days on one cup of water and how to climb walls. He is sarcastic. As the youngest team member, he yearns most to find his parents.
- Sara (サラ, Sara)/Yellow Flash (イエローフラッシュ, Ierō Furasshu): She developed a sharp mind on the ice planet Yellow Star, often seen as cold and serious herself by most people. However, she is actually a caring person. She is able to analyze the attacks and strategies of the villains. In the series finale, Sara learns that she is the biological daughter of Doctor Tokimura.
- Lou (ルー, Rū)/Pink Flash (ピンクフラッシュ, Pinku Furasshu): She developed incredible jumping abilities on high gravity planet Pink Star. She possesses immense physical strength, which causes her to easily exhaust herself. She once mothered a Beast Warrior.

=== Allies ===
- Mag (マグ, Magu): A robot programmed by the aliens of the Flash Star to guard the Round Base from intruders. After being subdued by the Flashmen, Mag is reprogramed to assist them. He upgrades the prisms in their helmets to give them stronger prism weapons when the Mess officers power up, Mag can also pilot the Star Condor as seen in an episode where Jin Needs parts for his Flash Hawk.
- Doctor Tokimura (時村博士, Tokimura-hakase): A scientist and family man who lost one of his children 20 years to the Alien Hunters. Because the Alien Hunters blurred his memories of the event, he has created a time machine to return to that time to find out more information regarding the events. He helps the Flashmen with his inventions. In the series finale, he discovers that Sara is his daughter.
- Setsuko Tokimura (時村節子, Tokimura Setsuko): The wife of Doctor Tokimura, who is also Sara's mother.
- Hero Titan (英雄・タイタン, Eiyū Taitan): A legendary warrior of the Flash Stars. He is the one who the Flash aliens based their Flashman technology and mecha after. He was an honorable soldier who tracked down Mess from planet to planet to stop them. As a result of his travels away from the Flash system, he developed the Anti-Flash Phenomenon and died while in battle with Baraki.
- Leh Baraki (レー・バラキ, Rē Baraki): The first creation of Lie Köpflen. He fought with Hero Titan and was saved by him. In awe of the legendary warrior's courage and honor, Leh Baraki decided to defect from Mess and promised the dying Titan that he would deliver the Flash Titan when it was needed. Therefore, he fell into a slumber aboard the Flash Titan, who followed the Star Condor when it arrived to Earth, lying dormant until it was needed. He was killed by Kauler and the monster The Drake. In his dying breath, he tries to warn the Flashmen about a weak point of theirs that shall be their downfall, but expires before succeeding.

=== Reconstructive Experiment Empire Mess ===
The Reconstructive Experiment Empire Mess (改造実験帝国メス, Kaizō Jikken Teikoku Mesu) is a space-traveling alien empire that takes over planets, using their lifeforms as raw materials in its experiments. Their goal is to transform its leader Lah Deus into the strongest being in the universe through repeated bio-augmentation. The Reconstructive Experiment Empire Mess' base of operations is the UFO-like spaceship called Labo.

- Great Emperor Lah Deus (大帝ラー・デウス, Taitei Rā Deusu; 1–49): The leader of the Reconstructive Experiment Empire Mess who sought to become the ultimate life form. To fulfill that end, he recruited several Great Doctor's over the Eons, some he abducted like Doctor Köpflen. As a result, he has undergone several reconstructive operations in those years. He could fire energy shots from his fingers to punish his officers. Before the finale, after Kauler and Gardan dismantled Lah Deus, Lah Deus was transformed by Köpflen into the Deus Beast Warrior The Deusura (ザ・デウスーラ, Za Deusūra). After being destroyed by the Flashmen, his broken mask was taken by Köpflen to extract its DNA and fuse it with Kragen for his final three-legged jellyfish-like creation The Demoss (ザ・デーモス, Za Dēmosu). A big immobile character, The Demoss is actually portrayed by a kaiju-sized puppet-like mannequin. THe Demoss was put down by Great Titan
- Great Doctor Lie Köpflen (大博士リー・ケフレン, Dai Hakase Rī Kefuren): The right-hand man of Deus and creator of the empire's Beast Warriors by using a keyboard-like device called DNA Synthesizer. The centuries gave Köpflen a god complex as he turned his back on Lah Deus to become the ruler of Mess. Köpflen does not know that he is actually an Earthling just like the Flashmen and was abducted 300 years ago as a baby by Deus, who later trained him in genetics. In the final episode, he offers the Flashmen a chance to operate on them to repair their Anti-Flash Phenomenon in exchange for his life in the finale. After their refusal and the destruction of the DNA Synthesizer, Köpflen dies in Labo's explosion.
- Leh Wanda (レー・ワンダ, Rē Wanda; 1–47): A bat-winged, zebra-striped swordsman full of pride and overconfidence. He believes himself to be superior but is disgusted once he learns from Köpflen that he was a composite being created from five grotesque and ordinary creatures making him similar to a Chimera. Later powered up as the monster Wandarla (ワンダーラ, Wandāra), in which he possessed the power to stop time for exactly 3 seconds. By combining his powers with a Beast Warrior, he could stop time in an area for an indefinite amount of time. He challenged Red Flash to a final duel to prove his strength after losing his power and was eventually destroyed.
- Leh Näfel (レー・ネフェル, Rē Neferu): A cunning and cruel cat/leopard-like loyal soldier, Näfel was among the first creations of Köpflen and in the final episode calls him "father". She had a talent for disguise and often caught members of Flashman off guard this way to attack them. She was later powered up to be able to transform into the cat/leopard monster Näfelura (ナフェルラ, Naferura). She was stabbed to death by Red Flash while protecting Köpflen in the finale.
- Leh Gals (レー・ガルス, Rē Garusu; 1–28): A big and strong commander made up of genes of unspecified wild beasts making him similar to a Chimera like Leh Wanda where he has a right reptilian eye, two tentacles on his face, thick white fur similar to a polar bear or a gorilla on his right shoulder, claws on his hands and feet, and a whip-like tail that moves on its own. Leh Gals does not talk, but roars a lot while fighting the Flashmen. He receives a power-up in Episode 28, but is destroyed by the Flash King.
- Wolk (ウルク, Uruku; 1–45) and Kilt (キルト, Kiruto; 1–45): The assistants of Näfel which are derived from a wolf and a cat. In Episode 45, Kilt was transformed by Keflen into the Deus Beast Warrior The Kiltos (ザ・キルトス, Za Kirutosu) and was nearly killed by the Flashmen. To save her, Wolk decided to let herself be absorbed by her partner. However, their unified form was ultimately destroyed by the Great Titan.
- Alien Hunters (エイリアンハンター, Eirian Hantā): They are a gang of bounty hunters who worked most for Mess in rounding up lifeforms for them to experiment on.
  - Sir Kauler (サー・カウラー, Sā Kaurā): The leader of the Alien Hunters, He was the one who kidnapped the five infants who grew up into the Flashmen. He rebels once Mess keeps considering him an outsider, despite the success he has brought them. Red Flash severely wounded him in a fatal exchange of blows in Episode 48. After letting Sara discover the truth about her parents, Kauler decides to perform a kamikaze attack on Labo to kill Köpflen, but fails and ultimately dies in his UFO's explosion.
  - Boh Gardan (ボー・ガルダン, Bō Garudan): The assistant leader of the Alien Hunters. He dual wields a pair of steel sticks. He was involuntarily mutated by Köpflen into the Deus Beast Warrior The Gardess (ザ・ガルデス, Za Garudesu).
  - Kerao (ケラオ): A cricket/gecko-themed Alien Hunter who wields a laser gun. He was eaten alive by the monster The Gitan.
  - Baura (バウラ): An ape-like Alien Hunter who wields a huge scythe.
  - Hag (ハグ, Hagu): An insectoid-like Alien Hunter. Wielding a bow and arrow, she was the sole female Alien Hunter. She was able to emit damaging beams from her eyes.
  - Hou (ホウ, Hō): An ape/electric eel/porcupine-themed Alien Hunter dual wields a pair of boomerangs. He was also able to grapple opponents and electrocute them.
- Zolohs (ゾロー, Zorō): (Note: Also spelt as Zoro.) The mass-produced foot soldiers of Mess are green-eyed, red-carapaced insectoid ants. They sprayed acidic strings from their mouths, which caused victims to disappear.
- Kragen (クラーゲン, Kurāgen): A giant monster created from jellyfish DNA that enlarges the Beast Warriors by energy transfer, shrinking itself in the process. Its name comes from the Japanese word for jellyfish – kurage (海月). Kragen was later used with what's left of Desura's DNA to form The Demoss.

==== Beast Warriors ====
The Beast Warriors (獣戦士, Jūsenshi) are Chimera-based monsters that are created by Great Doctor Lie Köpflen through his DNA synthesizer.

- The Baraboss (ザ・バラボス, Za Baraboss): An elephant Beast Warrior.
- The Zululuk (ザ・ズルルク, Za Zururuku): An ammonite Beast Warrior.
- The Garagoss (ザ・ガラゴス, Za Garagosu): A cyclopean Beast Warrior created when a dog was augmented with the DNA of a cheetah, a gorilla, a spider, a hawk, and a dolphin. Despite its unique skills, The Garagoss is afraid of puppies.
- The Zaimoss (ザ・ザイモス, Za Zaimosu): A Beast Warrior created from the DNA of a dead Alien Hunter and an octopus.
- The Girai (ザ・ギーライ, Za Gīrai): A Beast Warrior with an upside down head who was created from the DNA of a tortoise and a Space Turtle.
- The Gerzol (ザ・ゲルゾル, Za Geruzoru): A squid/slug Beast Warrior.
- The Saizar (ザ・サイザー, Za Saizā): A flute-tailed dinosaur Beast Warrior.
- The Gariburu (ザ・ガリブル, Za Gariburu): A chameleon/sea cucumber/jellyfish Beast Warrior.
- The Jigen (ザ・ジーゲン, Za Jīgen): A flying squirrel Beast Warrior with dimensional space-manipulation abilities.
- The Galubari (ザ・ガルバリ, Za Garubari): A rose/eel Beast Warrior with a secondary interior mouth who was created through an experiment with animal and plant DNA that gave it the traits of a carnivorous plant.
- The Powaburu (ザ・パワブル, Za Pawaburu): A rock Beast Warrior that hatched from an egg where it imprinted itself onto Lou before it can be imprinted on Leh Gals.
- The Gilgiss (ザ・ギルギス, Za Girugisu): A zebra/bison Beast Warrior with attributes similar to Leh Wanda.
- The Jirugal (ザ・ジルガル, Za Jirugaru): A Beast Warrior created from the DNA of Jin, a weasel, and a cat.
- The Mashiras (ザ・マシラス, Za Mashirasu): A marlin/flying fish Beast Warrior.
- The Zukonda (ザ・ズコンダ, Za Zukonda): A duplicating eel gobey Beast Warrior.
- The Jiraika (ザ・ジライカ, Za Jiraika): A mantis/termite Beast Warrior.
- The Drake (ザ・ドレイク, Za Doreiku): A caterpillar/Bigfoot Beast Warrior.
- The Buruzas (ザ・ブルザス, Za Buruzasu): A vampiric rhinoceros beetle/mosquito Beast Warrior.
- The Zobalda (ザ・ゾバルダ, Za Zobaruda): A two-headed naked mole-rat Beast Warrior created from a man named Milan (ミラン, Miran) who was spliced with the DNA of aliens by Great Doctor Lie Köpflen. Despite this, Milan was able to transform back to normal for one hour a day. When the left head was sliced off by Sara, he was restored to normal, placed in cryogenic stasis, and sent to Flash's homeworld to have the alien DNA removed from him.
- The Argoss (ザ・アルゴス, Za Arugosu): A chameleon/peafowl Beast Warrior.
- The Nenjiki (ザ・ネンジキ, Za Nenjiki): A unicorn-horned goat Beast Warrior with wish-granting and mind-control abilities.
- The Dapiras (ザ・ダピラス, Za Dapirasu): A termite/beetle Beast Warrior with energy absorption and regerating abilities.
- The Gurumess (ザ・グルメス, Za Gurumesu): A pumpkin Beast Warrior with a chef personality and kitchen utensils instead of hands.
- The Jagan (ザ・ジャガン, Za Jagan): A Beast Warrior created by infusing tapeworm DNA, pillbug DNA, and alien DNA into a human boxer named Ryuu Wakasa.
- The Sworduss (ザ・ソードス, Za Sōdosu): A porcupine/mantis Beast Warrior with swords for hands.
- The Ganmel (ザ・ガンメル, Za Ganmeru): A bat-faced squid/coral Beast Warrior.
- The Gostero (ザ・ゴステロ, Za Gosutero): A killer whale/bird Beast Warrior with a smaller bird-like beak inside its larger mouth.
- The Biinon (ザ・ビーノン, Za Bīnon): A cownose ray-faced stingray Beast Warrior.
- The Wolkil (ザ・ウルキル, Za Urukiru): A two-headed wolf/cat Beast Warrior who was created from the DNA of Wolk and Kilt.
- The Mazarass (ザ・マザラス, Za Mazarasu): A moth/spider Beast Warrior.
- The Garabas (ザ・ガラバス, Za Garabasu): A phoenix/rhinoceros Beast Warrior.
- The Metagas (ザ・メタガス, Za Metagasu): A plant/crab/slug Beast Warrior whose body is actually composed of smaller slugs.
- The Devilub (ザ・デビルブ, Za Debirubu): A devil/dragon Beast Warrior.
- The Zeragill (ザ・ゼラギル, Za Zeragiru): A mind-controlling monkey/ground sloth Beast Warrior from the planet Belda with five mask-like faces that have a compartmentalized mind.
- The Menonga (ザ・メノンガ, Za Menonga): A multi-eyed reptile Beast Warrior of indeterminate species with bird-like beaks on its body that have lamprey mouths inside.
- The Zehgul (ザ・ゼーゲル, Za Zēgeru): A baboon skeleton Beast Warrior who works as the prison officer of Execution City.
- The Bucross (ザ・ブクロス, Za Bukurosu): A fish/frog Beast Warrior.
- The Descom (ザ・デスコン, Za Desukon): A goosefish Beast Warrior.
- The Gitan (ザ・ギータン, Za Gītan): A frog/ant Beast Warrior.

===== Deus Beast Warriors =====
The Deus Beast Warriors (デウス獣戦士, Deusu Jū Senshi) are stronger versions of the Beast Warriors who are spliced with Great Emperor Ra Deus' DNA.

- The Taffmoss (ザ・タフモス, Za Tafumosu): A Chimera Deus Beast Warrior created by fusing Baura, Hag and Hou with Great Emperor Ra Deus' DNA.
- The Nefuluss (ザ・ネフルス, Za Nefurusu): A cat/leopard Deus Beast Warrior created by fusing Great Emperor Ra Deus' DNA with a clone of Leh Näfel.
- The Wandal (ザ・ワンダル, Za Wandaru): A unicorn-headed Deus Beast Warrior created by fusing Great Emperor Ra Deus' DNA with a clone of Leh Wanda.

== Episodes ==
No.	Title	Original release date
1	"Hurry! Save the Earth"; Transliteration: "Isoge! Chikyū o Sukue" (Japanese: 急げ! 地球を救え)	1 March 1986
2	"Behold! The Giant Robo"; Transliteration: "Mita ka! Kyodai Robo" (Japanese: 見たか! 巨大ロボ)	8 March 1986
3	"An Old Enemy? Hunter!"; Transliteration: "Shukuteki? Hantā!" (Japanese: 宿敵? ハンター!)	15 March 1986
4	"Mag Is A Genius Robo?!"; Transliteration: "Magu wa Tensai Robo?!" (Japanese: マグは天才ロボ?!)	22 March 1986
5	"In The Care Of The Female Warriors!"; Transliteration: "Onna Senshi ni Go-yōjin!" (Japanese: 女戦士に御用心!)	29 March 1986
6	"Roar! Machine"; Transliteration: "Hoero! Mashīn" (Japanese: ほえろ! マシーン)	5 April 1986
7	"Balloon! Become A Weapon"; Transliteration: "Fūsen yo Buki ni Nare" (Japanese: 風船よ武器になれ)	12 April 1986
8	"Father!! Mother!! Little Sister!"; Transliteration: "Chichi yo! Haha yo! Imōto yo" (Japanese: 父よ! 母よ! 妹よ)	19 April 1986
9	"The Doctor Who Travels Through Time"; Transliteration: "Toki o Kakeru Hakase" (Japanese: 時をかける博士)	26 April 1986
10	"Attack! The Flower Girl’s Trap"; Transliteration: "Ute! Hana Shōjo no Wana" (Japanese: 撃て! 花少女の罠)	3 May 1986
11	"Lou Is The Beast Warrior’s Mother"; Transliteration: "Rū wa Jū Senshi no Haha" (Japanese: ルーは獣戦士の母)	10 May 1986
12	"Super Power! Wanda"; Transliteration: "Chō Pawā! Wanda" (Japanese: 超パワー! ワンダ)	17 May 1986
13	"Intense Battle! Watch out, Jin"; Transliteration: "Gekitō! Ayaushi, Jin" (Japanese: 激闘! 危うしジン)	24 May 1986
14	"Love!? Bun and the Female Gangster"; Transliteration: "Koi!? Bun to Sukeban" (Japanese: 恋!? ブンとスケ番)	31 May 1986
15	"The Giant Robo Is Worn Out"; Transliteration: "Kyodai Robo Yaburetari" (Japanese: 巨大ロボ破れたり)	7 June 1986
16	"The Human Minimini Plan"; Transliteration: "Ningen Minimini Sakusen" (Japanese: 人間ミニミニ作戦)	14 June 1986
17	"The Mysterious Giant Reckless Car!"; Transliteration: "Nazo no Kyodai Bōsōsha!" (Japanese: 謎の巨大暴走車!)	21 June 1986
18	"Big Reversal! The Transforming Robo"; Transliteration: "Dai Gyakuten! Henshin Robo" (Japanese: 大逆転! 変身ロボ)	28 June 1986
19	"Baraki’s Dying Warning"; Transliteration: "Baraki Kesshi no Dengon" (Japanese: バラキ決死の伝言)	5 July 1986
20	"Revival! Giant Robo!"; Transliteration: "Fukkatsu! Kyodai Robo!" (Japanese: 復活! 巨大ロボ!)	12 July 1986
21	"Sorrowful Sara"; Transliteration: "Kanashimi no Sara" (Japanese: 悲しみのサラ)	26 July 1986
22	"SOS! Phoenix!"; Transliteration: "Esu Ō Esu! Fushichō!" (Japanese: SOS! 不死鳥!)	2 August 1986
23	"Heart-Pounding Wishes!"; Transliteration: "Onegai Dokidoki!" (Japanese: お願いドキドキ!)	9 August 1986
24	"The Occult Summer Vacation"; Transliteration: "Okaruto Natsuyasumi" (Japanese: オカルト夏休み)	16 August 1986
25	"Hurry, Jin, Combination is Impossible"; Transliteration: "Isoge Jin Gattai Funō" (Japanese: 急げジン合体不能)	23 August 1986
26	"Space Pumpkin Cooking"; Transliteration: "Uchū Kabocha Ryōri" (Japanese: 宇宙カボチャ料理)	30 August 1986
27	"Dai’s Punch of Friendship"; Transliteration: "Dai Yūjō no Panchi" (Japanese: ダイ友情のパンチ)	6 September 1986
28	"Sublime! Fiery Gals"; Transliteration: "Sōzetsu! Honō no Garusu" (Japanese: 壮絶! 炎のガルス)	13 September 1986
29	"Monstrous Warrior Wandarla"; Transliteration: "Yōjūshi Wandāra" (Japanese: 妖獣士ワンダーラ)	20 September 1986
30	"Bizare Nefelura"; Transliteration: "Kaiki Neferūra" (Japanese: 怪奇ネフェルーラ)	27 September 1986
31	"It Vanished! The Power of the 5"; Transliteration: "Kieta! Gonin no Pawā" (Japanese: 消えた! 5人の)	4 October 1986
32	"We Like You, We Like You, Mag, We Like You"; Transliteration: "Suki, Suki, Magu, Suki" (Japanese: すきすきマグすき)	11 October 1986
33	"Papa Won’t Lose"; Transliteration: "Papa wa Makenai!" (Japanese: パパは負けない!)	18 October 1986
34	"Bun Disappeared In The Rapids"; Transliteration: "Gekiryū ni Kiąeta Bun" (Japanese: 激流に消えたブン)	25 October 1986
35	"The Starry Sky’s Duet"; Transliteration: "Hoshizora no Dyuetto" (Japanese: 星空のデュエット)	1 November 1986
36	"The Shocking Wonder Bug"; Transliteration: "Dokkiri Fushigi Mushi" (Japanese: ドッキリ不思議虫)	8 November 1986
37	"A Ghost’s First Love"; Transliteration: "Yūrei no Hatsukoi" (Japanese: 幽霊の初恋)	15 November 1986
38	"The Day Jin Dies?!"; Transliteration: "Jin ga Shinu Hi?!" (Japanese: ジンが死ぬ日?!)	22 November 1986
39	"Burn, Furious Sara"; Transliteration: "Moero, Ikari no Sara" (Japanese: 燃えろ怒りのサラ)	29 November 1986
40	"Execution City, Operation XX"; Transliteration: "Shokei Toshi Daburu Kurosu Sakusen" (Japanese: 処刑都市XX作戦)	6 December 1986
41	"Dai Becomes A Child"; Transliteration: "Kodomo ni Sareta Dai" (Japanese: 子供にされたダイ)	13 December 1986
42	"Don’t Cry! Female Warriors"; Transliteration: "Naku na! Onna Senshi" (Japanese: 泣くな!女戦士)	20 December 1986
43	"Kauler’s Treachery!"; Transliteration: "Kaurā no Hangyaku!" (Japanese: カウラーの反逆!)	27 December 1986
44	"Deus Beast Warriors Appear"; Transliteration: "Deusu Jū Senshi Shutsugen" (Japanese: デウス獣戦士出現)	10 January 1987
45	"Warrior! Leave The Earth"; Transliteration: "Senshi yo Chikyū o Sare" (Japanese: 戦士よ地球を去れ)	17 January 1987
46	"Only 20 Days To Live!!"; Transliteration: "Tatta Nijūnichi no Inochi!!" (Japanese: たった20日の命!!)	24 January 1987
47	"Wanda! Death Cry"; Transliteration: "Wanda! Shi no Zekkyō" (Japanese: ワンダ! 死の絶叫)	31 January 1987
48	"The End Of Kauler!!"; Transliteration: "Kaurā no Saigo!!" (Japanese: カウラーの最期!!)	7 February 1987
49	"Counterattack, Lah Deus"; Transliteration: "Gyakushū Rā Deusu" (Japanese: 逆襲ラー・デウス)	14 February 1987
50	"Farewell! Our Home Planet"; Transliteration: "Saraba! Kokyō no Hoshi" (Japanese: さらば! 故郷の星)	21 February 1987

== Movies ==
- Choushinsei Flashman (theatrical short released the same day as episode 3)
- Flashman: Big Rally! Titan Boy! (theatrical edit of episodes 15–18)

== Cast ==
- Jin: Touta Tarumi
- Dai: Kihachirō Uemura
- Bun: Yasuhiro Ishiwata
- Sara: Youko Nakamura
- Lou: Mayumi Yoshida
- Doctor Tokimura: Akira Ishihama
- Setsuko Tokimura: Tamie Kubota
- Great Doctor Lie Köphlen: Koji Shimizu
- Leh Wanda: Yutaka Hirose (credited as Kazuhisa Harose)
- Leh Näfel: Sayoko Hagiwara
- Leh Gals: Hiroyuki Uchida
- Wolk: Miyuki Nagato
- Kilt: Yuko Kojima
- Sir Kauler: Jouji Nakata
- Hero Titan, Boh Gardan (43–48): Yoshinori Okamoto
- Narrator: Eiichi Onoda

=== Voice actors ===
- Great Emperor Lah Deus: Unshō Ishizuka
- Mag: Hiroko Maruyama

=== Guest stars ===
- Miran: Kazuoki Takahashi (credited as Kenji Kawai) (21)
- Ryuu Wakakusa: Ryousuke Kaizu (27)
- Sibelle: Mina Asami (40)

== Songs ==
Opening Theme

- "Choushinsei Flashman" (超新星フラッシュマン, Chōshinsei Furasshuman)
  - Lyrics: Reo Rinozuka (里乃塚 玲央, Rinozuka Reo)
  - Composition: Yukihide Takekawa (タケカワ ユキヒデ, Takekawa Yukihide)
  - Arrangement: Keiichi Oku (奥 慶一, Oku Keiichi)
  - Artist: Taku Kitahara (北原 拓, Kitahara Taku)

Ending theme

- "Fighting Pose, Flashman!" (ファイティングポーズ、フラッシュマン!, Faitingu Pōzu, Furasshuman!)
  - Lyrics: Kōhei Oikawa (及川 恒平, Oikawa Kōhei)
  - Composition: Yukihide Takekawa
  - Arrangement: Keiichi Oku
  - Artist: Taku Kitahara
