= Yutaka Hirose =

Japanese actor and voice actor

Yutaka Hirose (広瀬 裕, Hirose Yutaka, born August 4, 1962) is a Japanese actor and voice actor, widely known to international audiences for his work in the tokusatsu genre of television series, usually portraying villainous characters. His real name is Kazuhisa Hirose (広瀬 和久, Hirose Kazuhisa), which was the name he was credited during his debut. He has also been credited as Takumi Hirose (広瀬 匠, Hirose Takumi), changing his stagename to "Yutaka" in 1999.

== Biography ==
Hirose was born in Tokyo. A gymnast in high-school, Hirose wanted to be an actor while putting his physical talents to use. Upon graduation, he joined the Toei Action Club, finding himself in various guest roles. In 1986, he auditioned for the role of Jin/Red Flash in Choushinsei Flashman, instead being cast as the villain Wanda and proved to be highly popular. In 1987, he auditioned for the role of Kotaro Minami in Kamen Rider Black. Wanting a younger unknown, they instead gave Hirose a guest role earlier in the series. By the time he was cast as the villain Dr. Kemp in 1988's Choujuu Sentai Liveman, his popularity for playing villainous roles increased.

Hirose became a favorite of writer Toshiki Inoue, who wrote him specifically his roles in Choujin Sentai Jetman, Gosei Sentai Dairanger, Choukou Senshi Changéríon and Kamen Rider Agito. Hirose also had guest appearances in tokusatsu shows on Tokkyuu Shirei Solbrain, while working, on the other hand, in films, stage plays and other television guest roles. Always admiring his Flashman and Liveman costar Jouji Nakata, who later found immense popularity in voice acting, he made his voice performance debut as Lian in Brave Command Dagwon.

Still proving to be very popular with tokusatsu fans to this day. He has currently put acting on hold to focus on representing and managing a talent division agency.

== Roles ==
=== Tokusatsu Credits ===
- Choudenshi Bioman (1984, episode 5) - Thug
- Dengeki Sentai Changeman (1985, episodes 4 & 45) - Dog Human / Army Officer
- Kyojuu Tokusou Juspion (1985, episode 14) - Groom
- Choushinsei Flashman (1986-1987) - Ley Wanda / Wandara (voice)
- Kamen Rider Black (1987, episode 4) - Hayami
- Choujuu Sentai Liveman (1988-1989) - Kenji Tsukigata / Dr. Kemp / Beauty Beast Kemp / Fear Beast Kemp / Fear Beast Zuno (voice)
- Tokkei Winspector (1990, episode 30) - Masao Murano
- Choujin Sentai Jetman (1991-1992, episodes 37 to 47) - Emperor Tranza
- Tokkyuu Shirei Solbrain (1991, episode 33) - Kousuke Doi
- Gosei Sentai Dairanger (1993-1994) - Jin Matoba / Demon-Fist Master Jin
- Choukou Senshi Changéríon (1996) - Kazuki Katayama / General Zander
- Kamen Rider Agito (2002, episodes 49 & 50) - Shirakawa

=== Voice Acting ===
- Brave Command Dagwon (1997) - Space Swordsman Lian

=== Movies ===
- Shin Gokudou no Tsumatachi
- Choushinsei Flashman (1986, film version) - Ley Wanda
- Bakusou Trucker Gundan (series)
- Doreijuu

== Trivia ==
- As a gymnast and member of the Toei Action Club, he often does most of his own stunts.
- Specializes in stunts and sword battle.
- Directed the action sequences for the sequels to the Bakusou Trucker Gundan movies.
