= Kazuhiko Nishimura =

Japanese actor

- 西村 和彦
- Born: August 21, 1966 (age 59); Fushimi-ku, Kyoto, Kyoto Prefecture, Japan
- Occupation: Actor
- Years active: 1987–present
- Agent: Sony Music Artists
- Height: 1.75 m (5 ft 9 in)
- Spouses: Mai Tachihara (1996–2005); Tomomi Kunishige (2006–2015)
- Website: Official website

Kazuhiko Nishimura (西村 和彦, Nishimura Kazuhiko; born August 21, 1966, in Fushimi-ku, Kyoto, Kyoto Prefecture, Japan) is a Japanese actor who is represented by the talent agency Sony Music Artists.

== Filmography ==
=== TV series ===
Year	Title	Role	Network	Notes	Ref(s)
1987	Hikari Sentai Maskman	Kurokawa	TV Asahi	Episodes 28-29	
1987	Bay City Deka	Ryo	TV Asahi	Episode 12	
1988	Tsubasa o Kudasai		NHK		
1988	Choujuu Sentai Liveman	Joh Ohara / Yellow Lion	TV Asahi		
1989	Abarenbō Shōgun III	Daisuke	TV Asahi		
1990	Tsuki Umaya Oen Jiken-chō		TV Tokyo	Episode 1	
1990	Itsuka Dare Ka To		TBS		
1990	School Wars II	Seiji Mizuguchi	TBS		
1991	Sea of Love		TV Tokyo		
1991	Rouge no Dengon		TBS	Episode 13	
1991	Vuansankan Kekkon	Kiyoshi Ichikawa	Fuji TV		
1992	Taira no Kiyomori	Minamoto no Yoshihira	TBS		
1992	Hissatsu Special Shinshun Senritsu Yūkai Sa Reru	Nowake no Tsurukichi	Asahi Broadcasting System		
1992	Ura Keiji: Uradeka	Toshihiko Minami	Asahi Broadcasting Corporation / TV Asahi		
1992	Hōigaku Kyōshitsu no Jiken File	Toru Mizumura	TV Asahi		
1992	Tenshi no Yō Ni Ikite Mitai	Ryo Makimura	TBS		
1992	Darekaga Kanojo o Aishi Teru	Junya Asakura	Fuji TV		
1992	Simon Fumi Selection		TV Asahi	Episode 1	
1993	If Moshimo		Fuji TV		
1993	Mayonaka o kake nukeru		TV Asahi		
1994	Piano	Tatsuro Miyashita	NHK	Asadora	
1995	Hachidai Shōgun Yoshimune	Tokugawa Munetaka	NHK	Taiga drama	
1995	Gamandekinai!	Kenji Oba	Kansai / Fuji TV		
1995	Okami Mitsuyo Jo Notatakai	Ryosuke Maeda	TBS		
1995	Natsu! Depart Monogatari		TBS	Episode 2	
1995	Keiji Hebi ni Yokogira Reru		NHK		
1995	7-ri no OL ga Iku!		TV Asahi		
1995	Drama Kekkonshiki-ba Hanayome Kaizoe Hito ga Yuku		Kansai / Fuji TV		
1996	Keishichō Kanshikihan	Atsuhiko Nakayama	NTV	Lead role	
1996	Aji Ichi Monme	Daisuke Komatsu	TV Asahi		
1996	Mitsuhiko Asami Series		TBS		
1996	Hadaka no Taishō Hōrō-ki		Kansai / Fuji TV		
1997	Ryōma ga Yuku	Takasugi Shinsaku	TBS		
1997	Ashita Fukukaze	Kyosuke Saegusa	TBS		
1998	Ieyasu ga Mottomo Osoreta Otoko Yukimura Sanada	Sarutobi Sasuke	TV Tokyo		
1998	Bridal Coordinator no Jiken-bo	Kimihiko Tezuka	TBS		
1998	Kankonsōsai Satsujin Jiken	Keiji Inoue	TBS	Lead role	
1998	Bishōjo Shinseki Gazer	Akira Hinata	TV Asahi		
1998	Totsukawa Keibu Series		TBS		
1998	Nurse na Tantei	Shingo Hiraoka	Fuji TV		
1999	Kyōto Meikyū Annai	Noboru Takashina	TV Asahi		
1999	The Hangman Mission 2000	Joji Takaoka	TV Asahi	Lead role	
1999	P.S. Genkidesu, Shunpei	Shinichi Tsutsui	TBS		
1999	Hamidashi Keiji Jōnetsu-kei		TV Asahi	Episode 1	
1999	Muta Keiji-kan Jiken File	Junichi Nishitani	TV Asahi		
2000	Card G Men Akane Kobayakawa	Sometaro Sawamatsu	TBS		
2000	Sorezore no Dangai	Shinichi Fukase	TV Tokyo		
2000	Saigo no Strike	Eiji Kiyokawa	Fuji TV		
2001	Yottsu no Shūshifu	Hiroyuki Koga	TV Tokyo		
2001	Inyōshi	Koremichi Sugawara	NHK	Episode 3	
2001	O-kyoku Tantei Akiko & Midori no Ryojō Jiken-chō	Naoto Ichinose	Fuji TV		
2001	Izumi Kyōju Fusai Series	Keiichi Tomori	TV Tokyo		
2003	Musashi	Date Masamune	NHK	Taiga drama	
2003	Dancing Life	Shunpei Tanahashi	TBS		
2004	Keishichō Kanshikihan 2004				
2004	Botan to Bara	Yukitakeshi Kiyohara	Tōkai TV / Fuji TV		
2004	Tama Minami-sho tatakiage keiji Chikamatsu heikitsu		TV Tokyo		
2005	11-tsū no… Dasenakatta Love Letter	Takayuki Kitamura	Asahi Broadcasting Corporation		
2005	Hi no Jūjika	Naoya Okouchi	Tōkai TV / Fuji TV		
2006	7-ri no Onna Bengoshi	Tetsuo Yamazaki	TV Asahi	Episode 5	
2006	Fugo Keiji	Akihiko Kurosaki	TV Asahi	Episode 6	
2006	Detective Conan	Kyōsuke Minamida	Yomiuri TV		
2006	Tōbō-sha Orin	Shino Maeda	TV Tokyo	Episode 5	
2006	Taikō-ki: Tenka o Totta Otoko Hideyoshi	Azai Nagamasa	TV Asahi	Episode 4	
2007	Inpei Sōsa	Takayuki Komatsu	TV Asahi		
2007	Shinano no Koronbo Jiken File		TV Tokyo		
2007	Teresa Ten Monogatari: Watashinoie wa Yama no Mukō	Satoshi Abe	TV Asahi		
2007	Sono Otoko, Fuku Shochō: Kyōto Kawaramachi-sho Jiken		TV Asahi	Episode 7	
2007	Natsu Kumoagare	Kenmotsu Umehara	NHK		
2007	Shikaku Ukeoinin	Shinji Oyakusha	TV Tokyo		
2007	Nyotei	Ko Daishotatsu	TV Asahi	Episode 6	
2007	The Embalmer	Hiroki Naruse	TV Tokyo	Episode 2	
2007	Hatsukoinet.com: Wasurerarenai Koinōta	Yusuke Akama	Asahi Broadcasting Corporation	Episode 2	
2007	Hagurekeiji Junjō-ha	Yoji Tashiro	TV Asahi		
2008	Oishī Depa Chika	Junichi Enokida	TV Asahi		
2008	Tsugarukaikyō Mystery Kōro		Fuji TV		
2008	Niji e no Tegami	Satoshi Moriyama	Home Drama Channel	Lead role	
2008	Omomizu no jo Nana-ban Shōbu: Tokugawa Fūun-roku Gaiden	Yukisuke Okami	TV Tokyo	Episode 1	
2008	Koi o Sute Yume ni Kaketa Onna: Edo Harumi Monogatari	Lover of Edo Harumi	Fuji TV		
2008	Nikutai no Mon	Kikuma	TV Asahi		
2009	Nene: Onna Taikōki	Akechi Mitsuhide	TV Tokyo		
2009	Hissatsu Shigoto Hito 2009	Togoro Isesaki	TV Asahi	Episode 6	
2009	Rubicon no Ketsudan		TV Tokyo	Episode 12	
2010	Akakabukenji Kyōto-hen	Saburo Tsujiyoshi	TBS	Episode 3	
2010	Ueru Kame	Indo Takagi	NHK		
2011	Kenji Kasumi Yūko	Yoichi Sakuragi	Fuji TV		
2011	Minami no Teiō	Shinji Kuroiwa	Kansai		
2011	Omiya-san Dai 8 Series	Kohei Towada	TV Asahi		
2011	Kaizoku Sentai Gokaiger	Joh Ohara / Yellow Lion	TV Asahi	Episode 30	
2011	Kaitō Royale	Takashi Kitaba	TBS	Episode 7	
2012	Shiawase no Jikan	Tatsuhiko Asakura	Tōkai TV / Fuji TV		
2012	Kazoku Hakkei Nanase, Telepathy Girl's Ballad	Shogo Ichikawa	MBS / TBS	Episodes 9 and 10	
2012	Monsters	Atsushi Suwa	TBS		
2013	Take Five: Oretachi wa Ai o Nusumeru ka	Shin Shimizu	TBS	Episode 2	
2013	Detarame Hero	Haruki Serizawa	NTV/YTV	Episodes 6 to 13	
2014	Ashita, Mama ga Inai	Hosogai	NTV	Episode 1	
2014	Onsen Waka Okami no Satsujin Suiri	Junichi Kasugai	TV Asahi		
2014	Keiji	Kazuyoshi Yuki	TV Tokyo		
2014	Hero	Jiro Tsuchiigaki	Fuji TV	Episode 4	
2015	37.5°C no Namida	Nishiki Sato	TBS		
2015	Kamen Rider Ghost	Ryu Tenkuji	TV Asahi		
2020	Ochoyan	Kiyoshi Miyamoto	NHK	Asadora	

=== Films ===
Year	Title	Role	Notes
1990	Gokudō no Tsuma-tachi Saigonotatakai		
1993	Dakane	Wataru Tachibana	
1995	Teito Monogatari		
1995	Minami no Shima ni Yukigafuru		
2005	Shi-kakan no Kiseki	Noriyuki Goto	
2008	Inju: The Beast in the Shadow	Keibu Matsumoto	
2009	20 Seiki Shōnen Dai 2-shō Saigo no Kibō	Keiji Saiki	
2010	Shibuya		
2014	Sway	Eric	
