= Sayuri Uchida =

Japanese actress

Sayuri Uchida (内田 さゆり, Uchida Sayuri; born October 25, 1972 in Kanagawa Prefecture, Japan) is a Japanese actress who appeared in the Super Sentai TV series Choujin Sentai Jetman. The program is the fifteenth entry of Toei Company's Super Sentai series. It aired on TV Asahi on February 15, 1991 to February 14, 1992 with a total of 51 episodes. She played the character "Ako Hayasaka" in the series.

== Filmography ==
=== TV roles ===
- Dokincho! Nemurin (Fuji TV, 1984 - 1985) - Mako Ooishi
- Papa Goukaku Mama wa Shikkaku (NTV, 1986) - Kaori Kurata
- Oyobi de nai Yatsu! (episode 9) (TBS, 1987)
- Momoiro Gakuen Toshi Sengen, Batsu Benten Jogakukan (Fuji TV, 1987)
- Kousoku Sentai Turboranger (episode 9) (TV Asahi, 1989) - Yumi Sakakibara
- Choujin Sentai Jetman (TV Asahi, 1991 - 1992) - Ako Hayasaka / Blue Swallow
- Sasurai Keiji Ryojou-Hen V (TV Asahi, 1992) - Harumi Tanaka
- Utau! Dai Ryuuguujou (episode 16) (Fuji TV, 1992) - Sayori
- Hyakujuu Sentai Gaoranger (episode 6) (TV Asahi, 2001) - Shimada

=== V-Cinema ===
- B-Robo Kabutack: The Epic Christmas Battle!! (Toei Video, 1997)

=== Film ===
- Miriko wa Makenai
- Super Sentai World (1994) - Voice Only in Blue Swallow

=== CM ===
- Hagoromo Foods / Sea Chicken
- Yomiuri Land
- 7-Eleven
- Kao / Kaori Haiter
- House Foods / Vermont Curry
