= Touta Tarumi =

Japanese actor and fashion model

Touta Tarumi (垂水 藤太, Tarumi Tōta, August 29, 1958) is a Japanese actor and fashion model from Tokyo. His real name is Touta Agawa (阿川 藤太, Agawa Tōta).

== Filmography ==
- Tokusou Exceedraft (Guest star in episodes 30) - Tamotsu Moriyama
- Tokkei Winspector (Guest star in episodes 31 and 32) - Yuuichi Hirosaki
- Uchuu Keiji Gavan (Guest star in episode 38) - Policeman
- Uchuu Keiji Sharivan (Guest star in episode 44)
- Choushinsei Flashman (1986-1987) - Jin / Red Flash
- Yearning (1993)
