= Daisuke Shima =

Japanese singer and actor (born 1964)

- 嶋 大輔
- Born: Hirofumi Morishima; May 22, 1964 (age 61); Nishinomiya, Hyōgo Prefecture, Japan
- Occupations: Singer, actor
- Years active: 1981–2013; 2015–present
- Spouse: Yukie Morishima (1994)

Daisuke Shima (嶋 大輔, Shima Daisuke; born May 22, 1964, in Nishinomiya, Hyōgo Prefecture) is a Japanese singer and actor. He is best known for appearing on television in tokusatsu and other dramas, such as Yuusuke Amamiya (Red Falcon) in the series Choujuu Sentai Liveman, as Shuji Koboku in Tokyo Elevator Girl, as Captain Harumitsu Hiura in Ultraman Cosmos, and as the cafe owner in Kisarazu Cat's Eye.

== Filmography ==
=== TV series ===
Year	Title	Role	Notes	Ref.
1988-89	Choujuu Sentai Liveman	Yuusuke Amamiya / Red Falcon	Lead role	
1992	Tokyo Elevator Girl	Shuji Koboku		
2001-02	Ultraman Cosmos	Captain Harumitsu Hiura		
2002	Kisarazu Cat's Eye	The Cafe Owner		
2009	Wel-Kame	Sanpei Suzuki	Asadora	
2010	Job Hopper Buy a House	Sanada		
2010	Chugakusei Nikki 2010	Daisuke Murota	Episode 2	
2018	From Today, It's My Turn!!		Cameo	

=== Film ===
Year	Title	Role	Notes	Ref.
1983	Miyuki	Ryuichi Masaki		
1999	Blood	Doctor Honda		
2002	Ultraman Cosmos 2: The Blue Planet	Captain Harumitsu Hiura		
2003	Kisarazu Cat's Eye: Japan Series	The Cafe Owner		
2006	Kisarazu Cat's Eye: World Series	The Cafe Owner		
2026	Okaeri no Yu			
