= Mikiko Miki =

Japanese actress

Mikiko Miki (三輝みきこ, Miki Mikiko; born on July 9, 1960) is a Japanese actress. Perhaps her best-known role is as Commander Aya Odagiri (a.k.a. "Chokan") in the Super Sentai series Chōjin Sentai Jetman. She also starred in Gosei Sentai Dairanger as the mother of Ko/Kiba Ranger.

== TV Roles ==
- Dennou Keisatsu Cybercop (1988-1989) - ZAC Officer Miho Asakuza
- Chōjin Sentai Jetman (1991-1992) - Commander Aya Odagiri
- Gosei Sentai Dairanger (1993-1994) - Ko's Mother
- Chouriki Sentai Ohranger (1995) - Masao's Mother
- Jirai wo Fundara Sayonara (1999)
- Kamen Rider Ex-Aid (2016) - Doctor

== Voice Roles ==
=== Dubbing Roles ===
- Stargate SG-1 (Janet Fraiser)
