= Chōjin Sentai Jetman =

Japanese television series (1991-1992)

- Genre: Drama; Tokusatsu; Superhero fiction; Action; Science fantasy
- Created by: Saburo Yatsude
- Developed by: Toshiki Inoue
- Directed by: Keita Amemiya; Kiyoshi Arai; Shohei Tojo; Masao Minowa; Taro Sakamoto
- Starring: Kōtarō Tanaka; Rika Kishida; Ikko Tadano; Sayuri Uchida; Toshihide Wakamatsu; Mikiko Miki; Masaki Tachi; Maho Maruyama; Miku Kuga; Yutaka Hirose
- Narrated by: Tsutomu Tareki
- Opening theme: "Chojin Sentai Jetman" by Hironobu Kageyama
- Ending theme: "Kokoro wa Tamago" by Hironobu Kageyama
- Composer: Kazuhiko Toyama
- Country of origin: Japan
- Original language: Japanese
- No. of episodes: 51 (list of episodes)

Production
- Producers: Kyōzō Utsunomiya (TV Asahi); Atsushi Kaji (TV Asahi); Takeyuki Suzuki (Toei Company)
- Running time: approx. 25 minutes

Original release
- Network: TV Asahi
- Release: February 15, 1991 – February 14, 1992

Related
- Chikyu Sentai Fiveman; Kyōryū Sentai Zyuranger

Chojin Sentai Jetman (鳥人戦隊ジェットマン, Chōjin Sentai Jettoman; Birdman Squadron Jetman) (Note: Normally, "Chōjin", when written as either 超人 or 超神, translates from "Super Human" and "Super God", but 鳥, the Japanese translation of "bird", replaces 超 for this series. This is because "Tori", the usual Romanization for Japan's kanji for "bird", is replaced with that of Japan's translation of "super", "Chō" - "Chō" can sometimes double as being an alternative Romanization for "Tori" as "Chō" is used in the Romanization of words that refer to ascension ("Ascension is one English word that is associated with "up") such as "transcendence" (超絶 Chōzetsu).) is a Japanese television tokusatsu series broadcast by TV Asahi. The series is the 15th installment of Super Sentai. Directed by Keita Amemiya, Kiyoshi Arai, Shohei Tojo, Masao Minowa and Taro Sakamot, it stars Kōtarō Tanaka, Rika Kishida, Ikko Tadano, Sayuri Uchida, Toshihide Wakamatsu, Mikiko Miki, Masaki Tachi, Maho Maruyama, Miku Kuga and Yutaka Hirose. It aired from February 15, 1991, to February 14, 1992, replacing Chikyu Sentai Fiveman and was replaced by Kyōryū Sentai Zyuranger. The international English title is listed by Toei as simply Jetman.

Shout! Factory released this series in North America on September 25, 2018. This is the 10th incarnation of Super Sentai to be released in North America and was the first series released that did not have a Power Rangers counterpart.

== Plot ==
This series takes place in 199X. (Note: The year is only addressed as "199X", but is later shown to be 1991, notably through Rie's tombstone.) On the Earth Ship, the command center of a defense agency called Sky Force, the guardians of peace on Earth, scientists have developed "Birdonic Waves", a newly developed technology that gives the subject superhuman abilities. Experiments called "J-Project" were successful. Aya Odagiri, the director of the project, chooses five elite Sky Force officials from Earth to use this technology. Ryu Tendo, one of the Sky Force officers, is successfully exposed to the Birdonic Waves, making him the first Jetman, the Red Hawk.

However, the Earth Ship is suddenly attacked by Vyram, an evil outer-dimensional organization bent on inter-dimensional domination. They successfully destroy the ship, apparently killing Ryu's lover and fellow candidate member Rie. In the chaos, the remaining Birdonic Waves for the other four officials become scattered on Earth, hitting four civilians. Odagiri and Tendo successfully escape and begin searching on Earth for the four remaining Jetmen, training them to aid them in stopping Vyram's plans of conquering their dimension.

The series later follows the tribulations of Ryu as he learns of Rie's survival and enlistment in the Vyram forces, as well as a love triangle between Gai, Ryu, and Kaori.

== Characters ==
=== Earth Defence Force Sky Force ===
Earth Defence Force Sky Force (地球防衛軍スカイフォース, Chikyū Bōeigun Sukai Fōsu) is a military organization that the Jetmen belong to.

==== Jetmen ====
Based at the Sky Camp (スカイキャンプ, Sukai Kyanpu), a high-tech base provided by Sky Force, the eponymous Jetmen are five people who gain superhuman strength through exposure to Birdonic Waves (バードニックウェーブ, Bādonikku Wēbu).

The team utilizes Cross Changer (クロスチェンジャー, Kurosu Chenjā) bracelets to transform. While transformed, each member gains a pair of Jet Wings (ジェットウィング, Jetto Wingu) that allow them to glide in the air. They also each carry a Wing Gauntlet (ウイングガントレッド, Uingu Gantoreddo), a Bird Blaster (バードブラスター, Bādo Burasutā), and a Bringer Sword (ブリンガーソード, Buringā Sōdo), the latter two of which can combine to form the Jet Hand Cannon (ジェットハンドカノン, Jetto Hando Kanon), as their sidearms. Later in the series, they acquire Beak Smasher (ビークスマッシャー, Bīku Sumasshā) handguns, which can combine with the Bird Blaster to form the Smash Bomber (スマッシュボンバー, Sumasshu Bonbā) rifle.

===== Ryu Tendo =====
Ryu Tendo (天堂 竜, Tendō Ryū)/Red Hawk (レッドホーク, Reddo Hōku), born on May 10, 1965, is 25 years old at the beginning of the series, but his 26th birthday occurs in episode 13. He is originally a Sky Force soldier codenamed "W6" and leader of the Jetmen. Being the only member of the Jetmen who is of military background, his policy is to be always professional and never let feelings affect himself in battle, and he expects the same from his teammates. This leads to a conflict when he discovers that his beloved Rie has become Maria, eventually coming to terms with the revelation as he resolves to save Rie from Vyram's control. However, Rie's death at the hands of his nemesis Radiguet proves to be the last straw, causing him to challenge Radiguet alone before Kaori consoles Ryu and encourages him to stay true to his own belief in justice rather than revenge. Three years later, he marries Kaori.

As Red Hawk, Ryu rides the Jet Striker (ジェットストライカー, Jetto Sutoraikā) buggy, which can be reconfigured into the Fire Bazooka (ファイアーバズーカー, Faiyā Bazūka) to destroy human-sized Dimension Beasts.

===== Gai Yuki =====
Gai Yuki (結城 凱, Yūki Gai)/Black Condor (ブラックコンドル, Burakku Kondoru) is the 26-year-old second-in-command of the Jetmen and a loner who hates being told what to do. Gai loves challenges and risks and is a womanizer and an avid if occasional gambler. His fighting styles are street fighting and mixed martial arts: his combat skills match those of Ryu, though he fights dirty and hits below the belt sometimes. He initially clashes with the straight-laced Ryu when drafted against his will but eventually comes to respect Ryu's largely principled disposition (Ryu falters only over the issue of his lost girlfriend, something Gai, being a womanizer, can sympathize with), ultimately becoming friends with him. He loves Kaori and often tries to flirt with her, leading to much frustration due to his initially unreciprocated feelings. When she finally accepts him, they frequently have problems in their relationship as they are too different. He later develops a rivalry with Vyram general Grey. He defeats Grey in their final encounter, in which a part of his helmet was damaged. Three years after Vyram's defeat, while buying a bouquet for Ryu and Kaori's wedding, he intervenes in a robbery and is stabbed in the stomach for the trouble. He makes it to the church after the wedding and talks to Ryu before he dies of his wound, passing it off as a hangover, satisfied that everyone he cares for has found happiness. In the manga, his position on the team is taken by Jeffrey Kensaki, a new hero who takes on the powers of Green Eagle.

As Black Condor, Gai rides the Jet Speeder (ジェットスピーダー, Jetto Supīdā) motorcycle, which is also ridden by Ako.

===== Raita Oishi =====
Raita Oishi (大石 雷太, Ōishi Raita)/Yellow Owl (イエローオウル, Ierō Ōru) is a 22-year-old large-framed, eyeglasses-wearing nature lover who enjoys vegetables and hates Vyram for their destruction of nature. He was raised by his grandmother, Kiyo, because his parents were busy running a restaurant. He harbors a crush for Kaori, vowing to be there for her even if he has no chance with her, although eventually, his ultimate subject of affection turns out to be his childhood friend, Satsuki. In battle, he specializes in raw strength techniques like head butts, body blows, sumo-based techniques, and hurling boulders. Three years after Vyram is defeated, he runs a farm with Satsuki.

As Yellow Owl, Raita rides the Jet Bouncer (ジェットバンサー, Jetto Bansā) four-wheel-drive, which is shared with Kaori.

===== Kaori Rokumeikan =====
Kaori Rokumeikan (鹿鳴館 香, Rokumeikan Kaori)/White Swan (ホワイトスワン, Howaito Suwan) is the 22-year-old heiress of the Rokumeikan Enterprises empire. She is taken care of by her butler, Jiiya (じいや), since her parents reside in New York City. She becomes a Jetman to escape the boredom of her heiress life. She is good at Kendo and is the best shot among the Jetmen. She was in the middle of a love triangle with Ryu and Gai. She was also learning through hardships brought on by her new profession as it clashed with her life as a spoiled rich girl while figuring out what was truly important to herself. She was once engaged to a wealthy businessman named Soichiro Kitaoji and was close to marrying him, but she quickly ended their relationship when she saw his selfishness in contrast to her team's selfless determination as warriors of justice. She does sometimes use her wealth to help the team, like when she purchased a large number of diamonds and other jewels to try and snap Ako out of the curse of the dimensional monster Diamond Dimension. At the end of the series, she marries Ryu.

===== Ako Hayasaka =====
Ako Hayasaka (早坂 アコ, Hayasaka Ako)/Blue Swallow (ブルースワロー, Burū Suwarō) is an 18-year-old senior student at Miharakita High School and a bright and cheerful girl who wants to marry a rich man. She first thought of being a Jetman as just a high-paying job, but her first battle helps her sense of justice take hold and makes her realize that she must use her newfound power to protect Earth. She is best friends with her classmate, Kyoko, who learns of her true identity during the Voice Dimension incident. From the Trash Dimension incident, the monster being her childhood toy Teddy, Ako learns of how wasteful humans can be. She debuts as an idol singer three years after the fall of Vyram.

==== Allies ====
===== Aya Odagiri =====
Aya Odagiri (小田切 綾, Odagiri Aya) is the first female commander in the Super Sentai franchise. She is good at martial arts, and the inventor of the team vehicles. She is both caring and stern to the Jetmen, and she is not above fighting alongside those under her charge and even personally covering their maneuvers if necessary. As befitting to her status as the Jetmen's commanding officer, her subordinates call her simply "Commander" (長官, Chōkan). She is also an able pilot, having flown Sky Force aircraft and even Jet Garuda on two occasions.

===== Supreme Commander Ichijo =====
Supreme Commander Ichijo (一条総司令, Ichijō-sōshirei): A Sky Force officer who cares only for himself and bears a grudge against Commander Odagiri for being the commanding officer in the Jetmen project, which fell to civilians. With his Neo Jetmen, Ichijo gains appointment to assume command of Sky Camp base, bent on making Odagiri suffer while removing her Jetmen from the picture. However, he subsequently proves himself to be utterly incompetent in his new capacity when Bio-Dimension Beast Meteor BEM infiltrates and wreaks havoc within Sky Camp, being instantly demoralized at the first sign of Meteor BEM gaining the upper hand, refusing to even defend himself when offered the option to do so, and trapping his own Neo Jetmen team (and Odagiri, who is attempting to aid the Neo Jetmen at the time) with the monster in a futile act of desperation. It is implied at the end of Episode 41 that Sky Force has since removed Ichijo from command and reinstated Odagiri in the aftermath of the attack.

Supreme Commander Ichijo is portrayed by Hideaki Tezuka (手塚 秀彰, Tezuka Hideaki).

===== Neo Jetmen =====
Neo Jetmen (ネオジェットマン, Neo Jettoman), J1 through J5, are a team created by Supreme Commander Akira Ichiro to replace the Jetmen, having Birdonic Reactors implanted in bodies, bypassing the need for regular exposure to Birdonic Waves. J1, J2, and J4 wield the Neo Sword (ネオソード, Neo Sōdo), the Neo Stinger (ネオスティンガー, Neo Sutingā) kusarigama, and the Neo Slicer (ネオスライサー, Neo Suraisā) bladed boomerang respectively. All five wield Neo Shooter (ネオシューター, Neo Shūtā) handguns and Neo Mine (ネオマイン, Neo Main) grenades, and their group attack is the Flare Buster twin cannon. They eventually give the Birdonic energies to the original Jetmen in order to restore their powers.

J1, J2, J3, J4, and J5 are portrayed by Yūta Mochizuki (望月 祐多, Mochizuki Yūta), Ryuji Kasahara (笠原 竜司, Kasahara Ryuji), Minoru Watanabe (渡辺 実, Watanabe Minoru), Takeshi Miyazaki (宮崎 剛, Miyazaki Takeshi), and Miyuki Nagato (長門 美雪, Nagato Miyuki), who is credited under 長門 美由樹 that shares the same reading, respectively.

==== Others ====
- Reverse Dimension Warriors (裏次元の戦士, Urajigen no Senshi): The last three warriors of Dimensia, a realm in the Reverse Dimension destroyed by Dimensional War Party Vyram. The group composed of Ray (レイ, Rei), his lover Kanna (カンナ, Kan'na), and the youthful Dan (ダン), they chased Vyram to Earth with the Bird Garuda. While Ray and Kanna work with the Jetmen in their fight against Semimaru, Dan becomes romantically interested in Ako when they meet, causing him to express his feelings in a comical fashion. After Ray and Kanna are killed by Radiguet when he hijacks Jet Garuda, Dan assumes his fighting form and is mortally wounded taking the robot back from Radiguet. He dies soon after Ako expresses her feelings about him. Ray, Kanna, and Dan are portrayed by Jo Ishiwata (石渡 譲, Ishiwata Jō), who is credited under Joji Ishiwata (石渡 譲二, Ishiwata Jōji), Kanako Maeda (前田 夏菜子, Maeda Kanako), who is credited under 前田 賀奈子 that shares the same reading, and Hideki Fujiwara (藤原 秀樹, Fujiwara Hideki) respectively.
- Reverse Dimension Berserker Soldiers (裏次元ベルセルクの戦士, Urajigen Beruseruku no Senshi): The two warriors from the Berserk region, destroyed by Vyram force under Radiguet whose people can change anything they hold into weapons, though they can give up that very power to save a life instead. Arriving to Earth, while Duran (デュラン, Dyuran) is cared for by the Jetmen, Ru (ルー, Rū) attempts to kill Radiguet. However, after Ru realizes the error of her ways and Duran is saved from the control of the monster Armor Snake, the two leave Earth to find a world they can find peace in. Ru and Duran are portrayed by Ayumi Takagi (高木 あゆみ, Takagi Ayumi) and Yūsuke Kikuchi (菊池 優介, Kikuchi Yūsuke) respectively.

=== Dimensional War Party Vyram ===
The Dimensional War Party Vyram (次元戦団バイラム, Jigen Sendan Bairamu) appears as a clan of outer-dimensional nobles, who conquered many worlds in the Reverse Dimension, and are now moving on to Front Dimension, ours. They boast about having achieved godhood, while they despise humans and see them as stupid and worthless. Their base of operations is the Demon Castle Vylock (魔城バイロック, Majō Bairokku), a brain-shaped castle capable of traversing dimensions and sending its forces to Earth due to its Dimensional Transfer Machine. After their leader got lost in the Reverse Dimension, its four leading members compete in a game to defeat the Jetmen with the prize being full-leadership. Tran eventually becomes powerful enough to assume command, but is deposed by Radiguet, who leads Vyram up to its destruction.

- Back Dimension Count Radiguet (裏次元伯爵ラディゲ, Urajigen Hakushaku Radige): A cold-hearted fossil-themed officer who is the nearest presence to a leader of the Vyram, refusing to acknowledge anyone above and will do anything to accomplish his goals including being the one who kills the Jetmen. In battle, Radiguet wields the Secret Sword Bloody Gate (秘剣ブラディゲート, Hiken Buradi Gēto) and can transform into his true form, Evil Beast Radigun (凶獣ラディガン, Kyōjū Radigan), when enraged. When Juuza returned to power, Radiguet attempts to kill her and ends being punished for his treachery by living as a human with no memory of his life in Vyram. Cared for by Saki, a girl on the verge of death, Radiguet unconsciously saves her life with his power. But though he wanted nothing to do with his past, Radiguet eventually regains his memories and helps the Jetmen in fighting Juuza. After killing Juuza to acquire Semimaru, Radiguet kills Saki to discard his humanity before nurturing Semimaru to assume its adult form though it was destroyed by the Great Icarus. Radiguet later attempts to bring the Demons under his control, managing to succeed with Ramon when he absorbed Gorg. When Tranza takes over the Vyram throne, Radiguet attempts to kill him, only to be made an example of by the stronger opponent and forced into humbling himself before Tranza. Baring a terrible grudge against Tranza since then, Radiguet allied himself with Maria and Grey to summon the meteor used to create Meteor BEM to take out the Jetmen, enraged to find Tranza used his plan as a springboard from his own scheme. Attempting to sabotage Veronica, Radiguet is hooked up to have his life force sucked out. However, instead of having the life sucked out of him, Radiguet drains Veronica's power. Later, after using the Jetmen to do his dirty work, Radiguet tortures Tranza before breaking his mind and leaving him powerless, becoming Vyram's leader. Ultimately, the side effects of his power boost manifest in his newly gained giant form, the armored dinosaur-themed Raguem (ラゲム, Ragemu). After killing Rie so Red Hawk could not have her, Radiguet battles him until the other Jetmen arrive. After the five Jetmen defeat him, Radiguet assumes his Raguem form which not even the Great Icarus is a match for until the Tetraboy punches the weak point Rie made. To counter their advantage over him, Raguem assimilates the Vylock into armor that he uses to overpower Tetraboy. The Great Icarus separates and Ryu uses the Jet Garuda to rip the armor off and the others destroy both the Jet Garuda and Raguem. Radiguet says that his soul will continue to curse the Jetmen for eternity from the Reverse Dimension before he explodes.
- Tran (トラン, Toran) is a psychokinetic child who suggested a game to settle who would be Vyram's new leader. He specialized into creating toy-ish monsters to satisfy his fun desires, and thought both enemy or ally fatalities as "just part of the fun". Being the youngest of the Vyram was a big complex to him until his failed attempt to take out the Jetmen during their retreat to the Yamada Ranch was the last straw. The constant anger became unbearable to the point of Tran using it to accelerate his growth. With his new-found power and maturity, Tranza (トランザ, Toranza) easily defeats both his comrades and the Jetmen for underestimating him before seizing leadership of Vyram. In addition to his psychokinetic powers from his gauntlet, and new-found arrogant nature, he can now assume disguises and wields the Boltranza (ボルトランザ, Borutoranza) blade. After his giant robot Demon Robot Veronica (魔神ロボ ベロニカ, Majin Robo Beronika) was ruined by Radiguet, and after completing his new Bio Gun, Tranza heads out to hunt both him and the Jetmen down. Fighting the entire Jetman team on his own, Tranza uses his Bio Gun to turn each Jetman member into a rock plate until only Ryu remained. However, with Radiguet aiding Red Hawk before betraying him, the Bio Gun is destroyed by Red Hawk's charged Bringer Sword and the others are freed with the destruction of Tranza's gauntlet as they use the Fire Bazooka on Tranza. Though he survives the attacks, Radiguet tortures Tranza before sparring him to live with a severe brain injury at the Joutou Neurosurgery Hospital.
- Maria (マリア) was formerly known as Rie Aoi (藍 リエ, Aoi Rie), ranked Sky Forcer W3, a love interest of Ryu's who plays the piano. Though originally to be a Jetman, Vyram's attack on the Earth Ship resulted with Rie being sucked into space. However, Rie is saved by Radiguet, who brainwashed her to be devoid of her memories as a human and made an official of Vyram. However, though he loved her and tells her that she is his, Maria defies Radiguet to suit her own agenda to be leader of Vyram. She loves to battle, and her methods are cruel and cold. She wields the Necrod, which can switch between sword, gun, and whip modes. The monsters created by her were often motivated by envy, and attacked mainly women. Since the Camera Dimension incident, unconsciously playing the piano, Maria develops a relationship with Grey. Since then, she played piano music for Grey despite not knowing why, until her identity was found out and the relationship got difficult. Grey was willing to let her go if it made her happy. During the Demons incident, Maria momentarily reverted to Rie until Radiguet forced her back to her Vyram persona with a vendetta against Red Hawk. Eventually forfeiting their contest, Maria accepts Radiguet's proposal of ruling by his side in return of becoming even stronger than she is now. As a result, Maria is infected by a cell born from Radiguet's blood that turns her into a vampiric beast as she targets men, though unaware that she would transform into mindless puppet over time. While fighting Ryu, Maria assumes her monstrous form as she battles Red Hawk before assuming Rie's appearance to catch him off guard as the cell transfers itself to Ryu in order to have him take out the Jetmen. While Ryu manages to return to normal, Maria is in the final stage of her transformation as she defeats the other Jetmen before Ryu arrives and manages to reach Rie, causing Maria to remember her true self as she reverts to her true form. When Radiguet comes to reclaim her, Rie pretends that she will go with him, only to stab him in the back before he mortally wounds her. Before her death, Rie asks Ryu to leave her out of it before being spirited away by Grey. Her ghost later appeared in the finale, saying farewell to Ryu after his marriage to Kaori.
- Grey (グレイ, Gurei) is a robot who ironically was always the most reasoning member of the Vyram. He wields the Grey Cannon (グレイキャノン, Gurei Kyanon) and the Hand Greyzer (ハンドグレイザー, Hando Gureizā) shotgun. Despite being a robot, he showed human feelings, especially love for wine, music, cigars, and particularly Maria, learning to play the piano from example. As a result, Grey supports Maria in shielding her when fighting Jetman, seeing Gai Yuki as an ideal rival. Learning of Radiguet's plan for her, Grey attempts to talk Maria out of it to no avail. This forces Grey to ask the Jetmen to save Maria. However, he instead takes her dying body away as he takes her death hard. With nothing to live for other than his code as a soldier, Grey calls the Jetmen out in a final match, with Gai wanting to fight him alone. Eventually, Grey is mortally damaged as Gai lit one last cigar for him as a sign of acknowledgment as a worthy rival before Grey shuts down.
- Empress Juuza (女帝ジューザ, Jotei Jūza) is the true leader of Vyram, referring to herself as mother of all creation, Juuza along her underlings Radiguet, Grey, and Tran had conquered many dimensions. While able to teleport, fire lasers from her hook use telekinesis, being intangible, and breathe fire in her human form, Juuza can become Demon Beast Juuza (魔獣ジューザ, Majū Jūza) where she fires a beam from her eyes, bullets from her fingers, and shock-waves and beams from her mouth, as well as become an intangible head. Thought to be killed during the Reverse Dimension Invasion War, she actually went under a long sleep after acquiring Demon Beast Semimaru (魔獣セミマル, Majū Semimaru) and incubating it, and came to Earth via a meteorite. She makes her presence known by causing a momentary blackout across the city. By the time the Jetmen investigate, finding Radiguet as he was about to kill her while asleep, Juuza emerges and resumes control of Vyram. She then proceeds to use the humans' pain and suffering from crystals sprouting from their bodies before becoming crystals themselves to feed Semimaru. The Jetmen nearly lose to her as Gai is affected by Juuza's crystal beam while shielding Kaori from it. After punishing Radiguet to live as a human for his treachery, Juuza resumes her attack as the Jetmen battle her before Gai succumbs to Juuza's spell and dies. With some unexpected assistance from Radiguet, White Swan destroys her forehead crystal after asking for Gai's strength in order to revive everyone she turned into crystals. Enraged that her face is hurt, Juuza assumes her Demon Beast Juuza form as the rest of Vyram and Black Condor join the fight against her as the Jetmen use the Fire Bazooka to defeat her. Near death, she is killed by Radiguet when he throws his sword into her throat just before Semimaru hatched.
- Dimensional Bug Mother (次元虫 (母), Jigenmushi Haha): A lovebug-themed alien that drains people of their energies in order to feed its Dimensional Bug spawn. Though destroyed by the Jetman, it detached itself from its egg sack before fighting them where its children were used by the Dimensional War Party Vyram.
  - The Dimensional Bug (次元虫, Jigenmushi) are the children of Dimensional Bug Mother who are used to possess any material.
  - The Bio-Dimensional Bug (バイオ次元獣, Baio-Jigenmushi) is a variant of the Dimensional Bug created by Maria that can fuse with any animal and item.
- The Grinam Soldiers (グリナム兵, Gurinamu-hei) are black-skinned magma-themed grunts born from Grinam seeds. They wield axes and are capable of launching explosive shells from their hands. The group were later summoned by Zaigan during Super Sentai World.

==== Dimensional Beasts ====
The Dimensional Beasts (次元獣, Jigenjū) are monsters that are created when a Dimensional Bug fuses with any material and are used by the Dimensional War Party Vyram. If the Dimensional Bug survives the Dimensional Beasts' destruction, it can revive it at giant-size.

- Fighter Dimension (ファイタージゲン, Faitā Jigen): A Dimensional Beast created when Radiguet had a Dimensional Bug possess Aya Odagiri's fighter aircraft.
- Faucet Dimension (ジャグチジゲン, Jaguchi Jigen): A Dimensional Beast created when Tran had a Dimensional Bug possess a faucet.
- Road Dimension (ロードジゲン, Rōdo Jigen): A Dimensional Beast created when Radiguet had a Dimensional Bug possess a traffic light.
- House Dimension (ハウスジゲン, Hausu Jigen): A Dimensional Beast created when Radiguet had a Dimensional Bug possess an apartment.
- Mirror Dimension (カガミジゲン, Kagami Jigen): A Dimensional Beast created when Maria had a Dimensional Bug possess a mirror.
- Diamond Dimension (ダイヤジゲン, Daiya Jigen): A Dimensional Beast created when Maria had a Dimensional Bug possess the cursed Bloody Diamond.
- Fashion Dimension (ファッションジゲン, Fasshon Jigen): A Dimensional Beast created when Tran had a Dimensional Bug possess a sewing machine.
- Noodle Dimension (ヌードルジゲン, Nūdoru Jigen): A Dimensional Beast created when Tran had a Dimensional Bug possess a ramen bowl.
- Vending Machine Dimension (ジハンキジゲン, Jihanki Jigen): A Dimensional Beast created when Grey had a Dimensional Bug possess a vending machine.
- Bus Dimension (バスジゲン, Bas Jigen): A Dimensional Beast created when Tran had a Dimensional Bug possess a bus.
- Camera Dimension (カメラジゲン, Kamera Jigen): A Dimensional Beast created when Maria had a Dimensional Bug possess a camera.
- Voice Dimension (ボイスジゲン, Boisu Jigen): A Dimensional Beast created when Maria had a Dimensional Bug possess a megaphone.
- Paper Dimension (カミジゲン, Kami Jigen): A Dimensional Beast created when Tran had a Dimensional Bug possess an origami.
- Divination Dimension (ウラナイジゲン, Uranai Jigen): A Dimensional Beast created when Maria had a Dimensional Bug possess a fortune teller machine.
- Vacuum Dimension (ソウジキジゲン, Sōjiki Jigen): A Dimensional Beast created when Tran had a Dimensional Bug possess a vacuum cleaner.
- Trash Dimension (ゴミジゲン, Gomi Jigen): A Dimensional Beast created when Maria had a Dimensional Bug possess a pile of garbage. Because of the teddy bear Poo-tan which belonged to Ako, it developed a good nature and had the power to restore items to good condition while consuming garbage. Trash Dimension sacrifices its life to protect Ako from Maria's attack. Ako later made a memorial for Trash Dimension.
- Dryer Dimension (ドライヤージゲン, Doraiyā Jigen): A Dimensional Bug created when Tran had a Dimensional Bug possess a hair dryer.

===== Bio-Dimensional Beasts =====
The Bio-Dimensional Beasts (バイオ次元獣, Baio-Jigenjū) are a type of Dimensional Beast when the Bio-Dimensional Bug infused with animal DNA possesses an item and are used by Dimensional War Party Vyram. Their growing method is the same as the Dimensional Beasts.

- Light Armadillo (ライトアルマジロ, Raito Arumajiro): A Bio-Dimensional Beast created when Maria had a Bio-Dimensional Bug infused with armadillo DNA possess a baseball field's lightpost.
- Space-Time Mammoth (ジクウマンモス, Jikū Manmosu): A Bio-Dimensional Beast created when Grey had a Bio-Dimensional Bug infused with mammoth DNA possess a clock.
- Armor Snake (ヨロイスネーク, Yoroi Sunēku): A Bio-Dimensional Beast created when Radiguet had a Bio-Dimensional Bug infused with snake DNA possess a samurai armor.
- Sticky Cockroach (粘着ゴキブリ, Nenchaku Gokiburi): A Bio-Dimensional Beast created when Maria had a Bio-Dimensional Bug infused with cockroach DNA possess a bottle of glue.
- Toxic Rat (毒ガスネズミ, Doku Gasu Nezumi): A Bio-Dimensional Beast created when Radiguet had a Bio-Dimensional Bug infused with rat DNA possess a toxic waste drum.
- Ant Bazooka (アリバズーカ, Ari Bazūka): A Bio-Dimensional Beast created when Tran had a Bio-Dimensional Bug infused with ant DNA possess a bazooka.
- Torpedo Piranha (ギョライピラニア, Gyorai Pirania): A Bio-Dimensional Beast created when Radiguet had a Bio-Dimensional Bug infused with piranha DNA possess a torpedo.
- Laser Lizard (レーザートカゲ, Rēzā Tokage): A Bio-Dimensional Beast created when Tranza had a Bio-Dimensional Bug infused with lizard DNA possess a laser weapon. It was easily defeated by the Jetmen and its Bio-Dimensional Bug was confiscated for study.
- Hammer Chameleon (ハンマーカメレオン, Hanmā Kamereon): A Bio-Dimensional Beast created when Tranza had a Bio-Dimensional Bug infused with chameleon DNA possess a hammer. This form has a hammer for a right hand and a mechanical pincher claw for a left hand. Tranza used Hammer Chameleon in a mission to retrieve Laser Lizard's Bio-Dimensional Bug. When Hammer Chameleon loses his hammer hand and is destroyed by the Jetmen, the Bio-Dimensional Bug associated with Laser Lizard possessed the hammer and revived Hammer Chameleon at giant size. It was destroyed by Jet Garuda.
- Sniper Cat (スナイパーキャット, Sunaipā Kyatto): A Bio-Dimensional Beast created when Grey had a Bio-Dimensional Bug infused with cat DNA possess a sniper rifle.
- Meteor BEM (隕石ベム, Inseki Bemu): A bug-eyed monster-themed Bio-Dimensional Beast created when Radiguet had a Bio-Dimensional Bug infused with barnacle DNA possess a meteor made of anti-Birdonic metal.
- Leech Drill (ヒルドリル, Hirudoriru): A Bio-Dimensional Beast created when Radiguet had a Bio-Dimensional Bug infused with leech DNA possess a drill.

=== Other villains ===
The following villains are not part of the Dimensional War Party Vyram.

- Majin Ramon and Gorg (魔神ラモンとゴーグ, Majin Ramon to Gōgu): Two Majin who were sealed away during the Taiko Era. Radiguet tried to get them to serve the Dimensional War Party Vyram upon freeing them.
  - Majin Mu (魔神ムー, Majin Mū): A Majin that worked for Majin Ramon and Gorg.
- Strange Dimensional Lifeform Hell Medusa (異次元生命体ジゴクメドゥーサ, Kaijigen Seimeitai Jigoku Medūsa): An internal defense mechanism that protects Demon Castle Vylock.
- Supreme Commander Akira Ichiro (一条総司令, Ichijō Sōshirei): A Skyforce member who is the Supreme Commander of the Neo-Jetmen and Aya Odagiri's superior. He has a grudge against Aya for being the commander of the Jetmen Project. Akira is later removed from Skyforce when his motives are exposed.
- Great Tomato King (トマト大王, Tomato Daiō): An outer-dimensional being called Metamol assumed this tomato-themed monster form from Raita's childhood nightmare.

== Production ==
Chojin Sentai Jetman is the first Sentai series that paid homage to another show, Science Ninja Team Gatchaman with the same birds and the Jet Garuda being a clear influence of God Phoenix. There is also some influence from the 1985 American movie The Breakfast Club. Ryu wears a sports jacket very similar to Andy and is also the more athletic of the group, Kaori, the princess, like Claire; Raita the geek, like Brian; Gai, the bad boy, like John; Ako the greedy girl similar to Allison being a Kleptomaniac. Developed before the ending of Chikyuu Sentai Fiveman, Toei chose Keita Amemiya to be the series' director and searched for actors who would play the main characters. One of them was Toshihide Wakamatsu who would go on to play Gai Yuki/Black Condor. Before the series, the members were all referred to by their color but both Amemiya and Suzuki said that "this [was] unnatural" and decided the characters to refer to each other by their names instead of their colors. Episodes without the characters transforming and fighting were also proposed but was opposed by Bandai until the later half of the series.

The more mature themes such as drama, romantic love triangles and tragedy were in the series' after Takeyuki Suzuki watched Tosho Daimos, and wanted to capture its "high romance". Both the comedy and dramatic tones influenced the series' overall popularity and had become its defining part.

== Episodes ==
No.	Title	Directed by	Written by	Original release date
1	"Seek the Warrior" "Senshi o Sagase" (戦士を探せ)	Keita Amemiya	Toshiki Inoue	February 15, 1991
2	"The Third Warrior" "Dai San no Senshi" (第三の戦士)	Keita Amemiya	Toshiki Inoue	February 22, 1991
3	"The Power of Five!" "Itsutsu no Chikara!" (五つの力!)	Kiyoshi Arai	Toshiki Inoue	March 1, 1991
4	"The Fighting Bride" "Tatakau Hanayome" (戦う花嫁)	Kiyoshi Arai	Toshiki Inoue	March 8, 1991
5	"Fall for Me" "Ore ni Horero" (俺に惚れろ)	Shohei Tojo	Toshiki Inoue	March 15, 1991
6	"Get Angry, Robo!" "Ikare Robo!" (怒れロボ！)	Shohei Tojo	Toshiki Inoue	March 22, 1991
7	"Ryu's Marriage!?" "Ryū no Kekkon!?" (竜の結婚！？)	Keita Amemiya	Toshiki Inoue	March 29, 1991
8	"The Laughing Diamond" "Warau Daiya" (笑うダイヤ)	Keita Amemiya	Kenichi Araki	April 5, 1991
9	"Muddy Love" "Doronko no Koi" (泥んこの恋)	Masao Minowa	Hiroyuki Kawasaki	April 12, 1991
10	"Cup Noodles" "Kappu Men" (カップめん)	Masao Minowa	Naruhisa Arakawa	April 19, 1991
11	"A Dangerous Game" "Kiken na Asobi" (危険な遊び)	Shohei Tojo	Kunio Fujii	April 26, 1991
12	"Hellbound Bus" "Jigoku-yuki Basu" (地獄行バス)	Shohei Tojo	Toshiki Inoue	May 3, 1991
13	"Maze of Love" "Ai no Meiro" (愛の迷路)	Masao Minowa	Toshiki Inoue	May 10, 1991
14	"The Bazooka of Love" "Ai no Hissatsu Bazūka" (愛の必殺砲(バズーカ))	Masao Minowa	Toshiki Inoue	May 17, 1991
15	"High School Student Warrior" "Kōkōsei Senshi" (高校生戦士)	Kiyoshi Arai	Mami Watanabe	May 24, 1991
16	"Paper Uprising" "Kamigami no Hanran" (紙々の叛乱)	Kiyoshi Arai	Kenichi Araki	May 31, 1991
17	"The Revived Empress" "Fukkatsu no Jotei" (復活の女帝)	Taro Sakamoto	Toshiki Inoue	June 7, 1991
18	"Gai Dies!" "Gai, Shisu!" (凱、死す！)	Taro Sakamoto	Toshiki Inoue	June 14, 1991
19	"I Can See!" "Miemasu!" (見えます！)	Keita Amemiya	Naruhisa Arakawa	June 21, 1991
20	"Marriage Vacuum Cleaner" "Kekkon Sōjiki" (結婚掃除機)	Keita Amemiya	Kenichi Araki	June 28, 1991
21	"Walking Garbage" "Aruku Gomi" (歩くゴミ)	Shohei Tojo	Kenichi Araki	July 5, 1991
22	"Exploding Love" "Bakuhatsu Suru Koi" (爆発する恋)	Shohei Tojo	Toshiki Inoue	July 12, 1991
23	"The New Squadron Arrives" "Shin Sentai Tōjō" (新戦隊登場)	Keita Amemiya	Toshiki Inoue	July 19, 1991
24	"Launch, Super Robot" "Shutsugeki Sūpā Robo" (出撃超(スーパー)ロボ)	Keita Amemiya	Toshiki Inoue	July 26, 1991
25	"The Laughing Shadow-People" "Warau Kage Ningen" (笑う影人間)	Masao Minowa	Kenichi Araki	August 2, 1991
26	"I'm a Caveman" "Boku wa Genshijin" (僕は原始人)	Masao Minowa	Naruhisa Arakawa	August 9, 1991
27	"The Great Escape From Hell" "Makai Dai Dasshutsu" (魔界大脱出)	Shohei Tojo	Kenichi Araki	August 16, 1991
28	"The Original Dimensional Beast" "Ganso Jigenjū" (元祖次元獣)	Shohei Tojo	Naruhisa Arakawa	August 23, 1991
29	"The Final Battle" "Saigo no Tatakai" (最後の戦い)	Shohei Tojo	Mami Watanabe, Naoki Yato	August 30, 1991
30	"The Three Demons Stand" "San Majin Tatsu" (三魔神起つ)	Masao Minowa	Toshiki Inoue	September 6, 1991
31	"The Squadron Disbands" "Sentai Kaisan!" (戦隊解散！)	Masao Minowa	Toshiki Inoue	September 13, 1991
32	"Wings!! One More Time" "Tsubasa yo! Futatabi" (翼よ！再び)	Keita Amemiya	Toshiki Inoue	September 20, 1991
33	"It's a Cockroach" "Gokiburi da" (ゴキブリだ)	Keita Amemiya	Kenichi Araki	September 27, 1991
34	"Traitorous Ryu" "Uragiri no Ryū" (裏切りの竜)	Shohei Tojo	Naruhisa Arakawa	October 4, 1991
35	"The Fighting Courage Given by a Dove" "Hato ga Kureta Tatakau Yūki" (鳩がくれた戦う勇気)	Shohei Tojo	Kenichi Araki	October 11, 1991
36	"A Walking Appetite! Ant-People" "Aruku Shokuyoku! Ari Ningen" (歩く食欲！アリ人間)	Keita Amemiya	Toshiki Inoue	October 18, 1991
37	"The Birth of Emperor Tranza!" "Tanjō! Teiō Toranza" (誕生！帝王トランザ)	Keita Amemiya	Toshiki Inoue	October 25, 1991
38	"Sudden Hammer!" "Ikinari Hanmā!" (いきなりハンマー！)	Masao Minowa	Takahiko Masuda	November 1, 1991
39	"Spin, Roulette of Life" "Mawase Inochi no Rūretto" (廻せ命のルーレット)	Masao Minowa	Naruhisa Arakawa	November 8, 1991
40	"It's An Order! Change the Squad" "Meirei! Sentai Kōtai Seyo" (命令！戦隊交代せよ)	Shohei Tojo	Kenichi Araki	November 15, 1991
41	"Transformation Impossible! The Base Destroyed" "Henshin Funō! Kichi Kaimetsu" (変身不能！基地壊滅)	Shohei Tojo	Kenichi Araki	November 22, 1991
42	"Sleep on My Chest!" "Ore no Mune de Nemure!" (おれの胸で眠れ！)	Masao Minowa	Toshiki Inoue	November 29, 1991
43	"Sneak into the Commander's Body" "Chōkan no Karada ni Sen'nyū Seyo" (長官の体に潜入せよ)	Masao Minowa	Toshiki Inoue	December 6, 1991
44	"Demon Robot! Veronica" "Majin Robo! Beronika" (魔神ロボ！ベロニカ)	Keita Amemiya	Toshiki Inoue	December 13, 1991
45	"The Hot Milk of Victory" "Shōri no Hotto Miruku" (勝利のホットミルク)	Keita Amemiya	Toshiki Inoue	December 20, 1991
46	"The Tomato Field's Great Demon King" "Tomato-batake no Daimaō" (トマト畑の大魔王)	Shohei Tojo	Kenichi Araki	January 10, 1992
47	"The Glory of Emperor Tranza" "Teiō Toranza no Eikō" (帝王トランザの栄光)	Shohei Tojo	Toshiki Inoue	January 17, 1992
48	"A Kiss That Calls Death" "Shi o Yobu Kuchizuke" (死を呼ぶくちづけ)	Masao Minowa	Toshiki Inoue	January 24, 1992
49	"Maria... Her Love and Death" "Maria… Sono Ai to Shi" (マリア…その愛と死)	Masao Minowa	Toshiki Inoue	January 31, 1992
50	"Battles to the Death" "Sorezore no Shitō" (それぞれの死闘)	Keita Amemiya	Toshiki Inoue	February 7, 1992
Final	"Flap Your Wings! Aviators!" "Habatake! Chōjin yo" (はばたけ！鳥人よ)	Keita Amemiya	Toshiki Inoue	February 14, 1992

== Related media ==
=== Novels ===
Following the conclusion of the TV series, the series main screenwriter, Toshiki Inoue, wrote a trilogy of Jetman novels from 1992 to 1995 that retold the events of the TV series. The novels were written specifically for adult fans of the TV series and included mature content, such as detailed descriptions of sexual intercourse between Ryu and Rie, Gai and Kaori, and Radiguet and Maria. Empress Jūza, a one-off villain in the series, had an extended role while the Dimensional Beasts and giant robots were eliminated, with the Jetmen fighting humans subjected to the Vyram's experiments instead.

=== Manga ===
A manga sequel to Jetman was published in 1996 authored by Akiko Fujii, in cooperation with the series' writing team (still under the Saburo Yatsude pen name). It was titled Chojin Sentai Jetman: Toki o Kakete (鳥人戦隊ジェットマン 時を駆けて; "Chojin Sentai Jetman: Time Flies"). Set five years after the series (and, therefore, two years after the story ends), it shows the four remaining Jetmen rejoining to battle a revived Radiguet, who had possessed Tranza's broken body. Radiguet kidnaps Ryu and Kaori's one-year-old daughter Aya Tendo and, much in the same way he turned Rie into Maria before, he accelerates her growth and brainwashes her into becoming Ruma, whom he considers a daughter. Meanwhile, Gai's empty spot in the team is filled by a young rock guitarist called Jeffrey "Jeff" Kenzaki (ジェフリィ・剣崎, Jefuryi Kenzaki), who is empowered by Birdonic Waves after a meteorite crashes next to him, and becomes Green Eagle (グリーンイーグル, Gurīn Īguru) whose suit is Green instead of Black. In this manga series, the Jetmen uniform is slightly different, with the helmets more closely resembling those of Gatchaman (translucent, protruding visors, and uncovered faces).

=== Video game ===
A video game version of Chojin Sentai Jetman was released for the Famicom on December 21, 1991. The game was published by Angel Time (a subsidiary of Bandai) and developed by Natsume. It is a single-player side-scrolling action game where the player assumes role one of the Jetmen members as they fight against the forces of Vyram. The player can choose which Jetman they want to control at the start of each stage, each having their own weapon and maximum hit points:

- Red Hawk and Black Condor: Bringer Sword, 8 hit points
- Yellow Owl: Wing Gauntlet, 7 hit points
- Blue Swallow and White Swan: Bird Blasters, 6 hit points

The initial five stages, Area A to Area E, can be played in any order, while the sixth and final stage, Area F, becomes available once the others have cleared. Each stage begins with a standard side-scrolling level in which the player fight their way to the end of the level in order to reach the stage's boss. Each Jetman has three types of attack: a weapon attack, a kick, and a special attack that destroys all enemies, but can only be used once (unless a replenishment is found). The boss segments consists of one-on-one battles between the team's giant robot, the Great Icarus, and a giant monster (all of them based on monsters from the show). The player has a four-level power gauge that will gradually fill up during the course of battle, which can be used to perform one of four possible special attacks.

The following is a list of bosses in the game and the stages where they appear:

- Mirror Dimension (Area A)
- Camera Dimension (Area B)
- Bus Dimension (Area C)
- Light Armadillo (Area D)
- Dimensional Mammoth (Area E)
- Destruction Beast Semimaru (Area F)

The game features four difficulty settings, a password option, and a Battle Mode where the player can fight against any of the first five bosses.

== Cast ==
- Ryu Tendo: Kōtarō Tanaka (田中 弘太郎, Tanaka Kōtarō)
- Gai Yuki: Toshihide Wakamatsu (若松 俊秀, Wakamatsu Toshihide)
- Raita Oishi: Ikko Tadano (ただの いっこ, Tadano Ikko) (Credited under Tomihisa Naruse (成瀬 富久, Naruse Tomihisa))
- Kaori Rokumeikan: Rika Kishida (岸田 里佳, Kishida Rika)
- Ako Hayasaka: Sayuri Uchida (内田 さゆり, Uchida Sayuri)
- Aya Odagiri: Mikiko Miki (三輝 みきこ, Miki Mikiko)
- Jiiya: Yūzō Hayakawa (早川 雄三, Hayakawa Yūzō)
- Rie Aoi/Maria: Maho Maruyama (丸山 真歩, Maruyama Maho) (Credited under 丸山 真穂 that shares the same reading)
- Radiguet: Masaki Tachi (舘 正貴, Tachi Masaki) (Credited under Daisuke Tachi (舘 大介, Tachi Daisuke))
- Tran: Miku Kuga (久我 未来, Kuga Miku)
- Tranza: Yutaka Hirose (広瀬 裕, Hirose Yūtaka) (Credited under Takumi Hirose (広瀬 匠, Hirose Takumi))

=== Voice cast ===
- Grey: Hideaki Kusaka (日下 秀昭, Kusaka Hideaki)
- Narrator: Tsutomu Tareki (垂木 勉, Tareki Tsutomu)

== Songs ==
Opening theme

- "Chojin Sentai Jetman" (鳥人戦隊ジェットマン, Chōjin Sentai Jettoman)
  - Lyrics: Toyohisa Araki (荒木 とよひさ, Araki Toyohisa)
  - Composition/Arrangement: Gōji Tsuno (つの ごうじ, Tsuno Gōji)
  - Artist: Hironobu Kageyama (影山 ヒロノブ, Kageyama Hironobu)

Ending theme

- "Kokoro wa Tamago" (こころはタマゴ; "Your Heart Is an Egg")
  - Lyrics: Toyohisa Araki
  - Composition: Kōji Tsuno
  - Arrangement: Kenji Yamamoto (山本 健司, Yamamoto Kenji)
  - Artist: Hironobu Kageyama
