= Yearning (1993 film) =

1993 film

- Theatrical release poster
- Directed by: Bandō Tamasaburō V
- Written by: Kafū Nagai; Myoko Sakurai
- Produced by: Shigehiro Nakagawa; Toshiaki Nakazawa
- Starring: Sayuri Yoshinaga; Kyoko Kataoka; Kirin Kiki; Toshiyuki Nagashima; Hiroyuki Nagato
- Cinematography: Mutsuo Naganuma
- Release date: 29 May 1993 (Japan)
- Running time: 98 minutes
- Country: Japan
- Language: Japanese

Yearning (Japanese: 夢の女, Hepburn: Yume no onna) is a 1993 Japanese drama film directed by Bandō Tamasaburō V. It was entered into the 43rd Berlin International Film Festival.

== Cast ==
- Sayuri Yoshinaga as Onami
- Kyoko Kataoka as Kaede
- Kirin Kiki as Omatsu
- Toshiyuki Nagashima as Odabe
- Hiroyuki Nagato as Customer
- Sumie Sasaki as Osawa
- Touta Tarumi
- Rokko Toura
- Katsuhiko Watabiki
- Shôji Yasui
