= Toshihide Wakamatsu =

Japanese actor

Toshihide Wakamatsu (若松俊秀, born December 6, 1965) is a Japanese actor born in Miyakonojo, Miyazaki, Japan.

== Profile ==
- He originally came to Tokyo to be a painter, but soon became interested acting in movies and plays.
- After graduating from Tokai University in 1988, he started acting.
- His acting debut was in May 1990, in the play "Champion", at the Aoyama Round Theater.
- His television debut was in "Vision of Family"(Mainichi Broadcast) as Tetsuo Kuramoto.
- Best known for his role as Gai Yūki/Black Condor in Choujin Sentai Jetman (February 1991-February 1992). He also performed the Jetman song "Condor of Flame" (炎のコンドル), His Character of Gai's image song. In addition to being a singer, he is also a composer. He reprised his role (albeit only as a ghost, as his character was confirmed to be dead) in episode 28 of the 35th Super Sentai series Kaizoku Sentai Gokaiger.
- His hobbies are surfing, painting and horseback riding.

== Appearance Works ==
=== Movies ===
- 8 Man, For the all lonely nights (1992) - Detective Yokota
- Kunoichi ninpô-chô IV: Chûshingura hishô (1994)
- Kunoichi ninpô-chô: Yagyû gaiden (1998)
- After the Rain (1999)

=== TV Dramas ===
- Vision of Family (Tetsuo Kuramoto)
- Choujin Sentai Jetman (1991–1992) - Gai Yuki / Black Condor
- Special Rescue Exceedraft (1992) - Koji Natori
- Homura Tatsu (1993, NHK) - Masatou Abe
- Kaizoku Sentai Gokaiger (2011) - Gai Yuki / Black Condor
- Again from the Heaven - Goro Yamaguchi
- Kurenawi - Koji Nishimoto

=== Stages ===
- H～i!Jack!! -Hi, Mr. Jack!! - captain
