= Epsilon Capricorni =

Star in the constellation Capricornus

- Location of ε Capricorni (circled)

Observation data Epoch J2000.0 Equinox J2000.0 (ICRS)
- Constellation: Capricornus
- Right ascension: 21^{h} 37^{m} 04.83068^{s}
- Declination: −19° 27′ 57.6464″
- Apparent magnitude (V): +4.62

Characteristics
- Spectral type: B2.5 Vpe
- U−B color index: −0.64
- B−V color index: −0.19
- Variable type: γ Cas

Astrometry
Proper motion (μ)	RA: +12.79 mas/yr Dec.: +0.28 mas/yr
Parallax (π)	3.09±0.18 mas
Distance	1,060 ± 60 ly (320 ± 20 pc)
Absolute magnitude (M_{V})	−3.03

Details

ε Cap A
Mass	7.6 M_{☉}
Radius	4.80 R_{☉}
Luminosity	4,649 L_{☉}
Surface gravity (log g)	4.0 cgs
Temperature	18,800 K
Metallicity [Fe/H]	−0.08 dex
Rotational velocity (v sin i)	225 km/s
Age	27.5±4.2 Myr

Other designations
- Castra, ε Cap, 39 Cap, BD−20°6251, FK5 3724, HD 205637, HIP 106723, HR 8260, SAO 164520, WDS J21371-1928A

Database references
SIMBAD	data

Epsilon Capricorni is a binary star system in the constellation Capricornus. Based upon an annual parallax shift of 3.09 mas as seen from the Earth, the star is located about 1,060 light years from the Sun. It can be seen with the naked eye, having a combined apparent visual magnitude of 4.62.

== Nomenclature ==
Epsilon Capricorni is the star's Bayer designation, which is Latinized from ε Capricorni and abbreviated Epsilon Cap or ε Cap. It is sometimes called by the name Castra, meaning "fort" or "military camp" in Latin, usually in an astrological context.

In Chinese, 壘壁陣 (Lěi Bì Zhèn), meaning Line of Ramparts, refers to an asterism consisting of ε Capricorni, κ Capricorni, γ Capricorni, δ Capricorni, ι Aquarii, σ Aquarii, λ Aquarii, φ Aquarii, 27 Piscium, 29 Piscium, 33 Piscium and 30 Piscium. Consequently, the Chinese name for ε Capricorni itself is 壘壁陣二 (Lěi Bì Zhèn èr, English: the Second Star of Line of Ramparts.)

== Observations ==
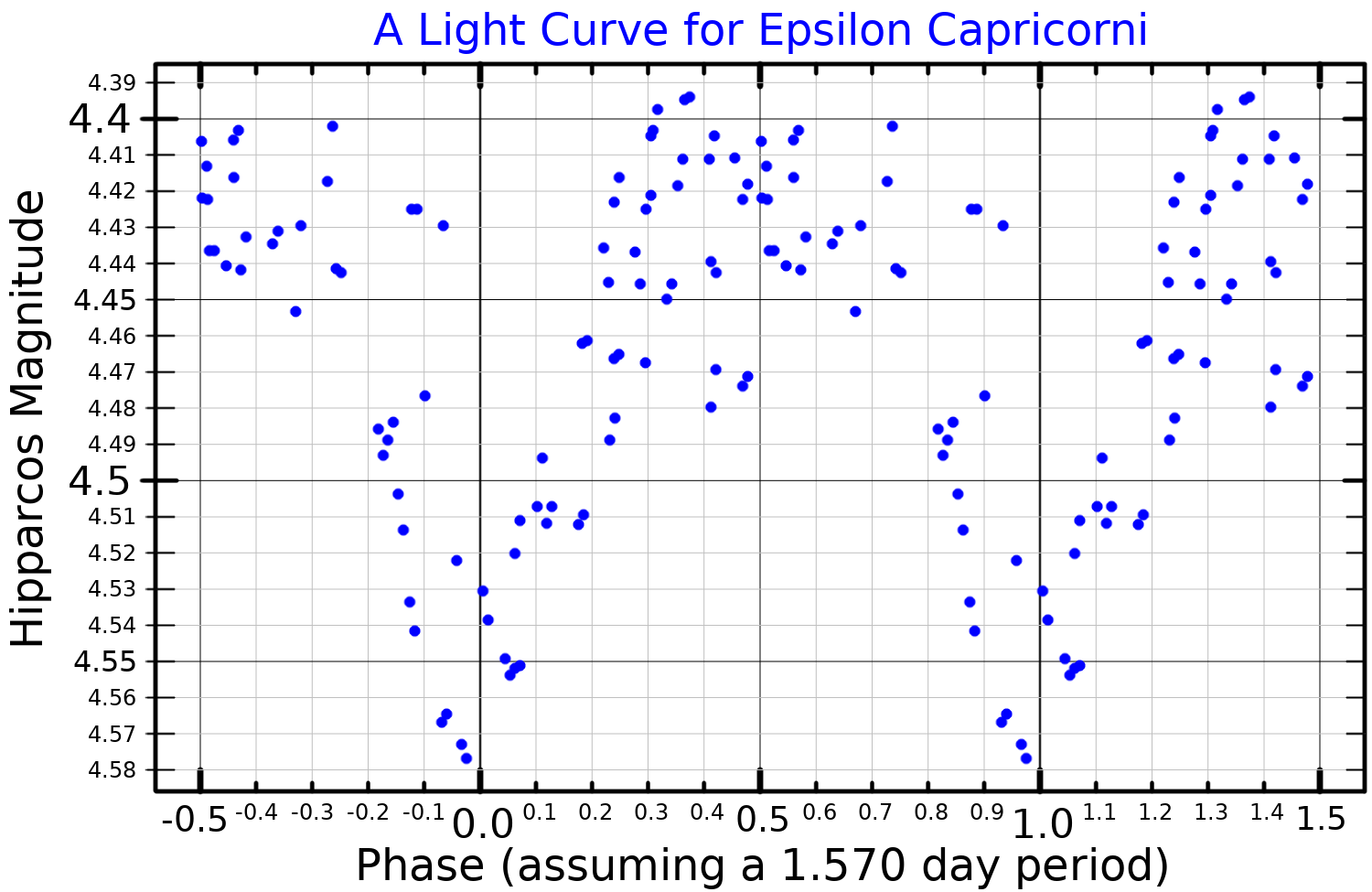
A light curve for Epsilon Capricorni, adapted from Lefèvre et al. (2009)

In 2006, this was reported as a single-lined spectroscopic binary with an orbital period of 128.5 days. It was confirmed in 2023. The primary, component Aa, is a Be star that is surrounded by ionized gas that is producing the emission lines in the spectrum. This circumstellar shell is inclined by 80° to the line of sight from the Earth. The system is undergoing both short term and long term variations in luminosity, with the short period variations showing a phase cycle of 1.03 days. It is classified as a Gamma Cassiopeiae variable with an amplitude of 0.16 in magnitude.

Epsilon Capricorni Aa is a blue-white hued B-type main sequence star with a stellar classification of B2.5 Vpe and a visual magnitude of +4.62. It has 7.6 times the mass of the Sun and 4.8 times the Sun's radius. The star is spinning rapidly, with a projected rotational velocity of 225 km/s. This is giving it an oblate shape with an equatorial bulge that is 7% larger than the polar radius.

The system has two visual companions. Component B is a visual magnitude 10.11 star at an angular separation of 65.8 arc seconds along a position angle of 46°, as of 2013. Component C with visual magnitude of 14.1 lies at an angular separation of 62.7 arc seconds along a position angle of 164°, as of 1999. Both stars are likely to be unrelated and at different distances to Epsilon Capricorni.
