= Delta Capricorni =

Binary star in the constellation Capricornus

δ Capricorni
- Location of δ Capricorni (circled)

Observation data Epoch J2000 Equinox ICRS
- Constellation: Capricornus
- Right ascension: 21^{h} 47^{m} 02.44424^{s}
- Declination: −16° 07′ 38.2335″
- Apparent magnitude (V): 2.81 min_{1}: 2.90 min_{2}: 3.05

Characteristics
- Evolutionary stage: Main sequence
- Spectral type: A7m III (kA5hF0mF2III)
- U−B color index: +0.07
- B−V color index: +0.31
- Variable type: Eclipsing binary (Algol-type)

Astrometry
Radial velocity (R_{v})	−6.3 km/s
Proper motion (μ)	RA: +261.70 mas/yr Dec.: −296.70 mas/yr
Parallax (π)	84.27±0.19 mas
Distance	38.70 ± 0.09 ly (11.87 ± 0.03 pc)
Absolute magnitude (M_{V})	+2.48

Orbit
Primary	δ Cap Aa
Secondary	δ Cap Ab
Period (P)	1.0227683 days
Eccentricity (e)	0 (assumed)
Inclination (i)	72.5°
Periastron epoch (T)	2448105.793±0.003 HJD
Semi-amplitude (K_{1}) (primary)	75.3 ± 1.0 km/s

Details

δ Cap Aa
Mass	1.54 or 2.0 M_{☉}
Radius	1.87±0.02 R_{☉}
Luminosity	8.5 L_{☉}
Surface gravity (log g)	3.66 cgs
Temperature	7,000 K
Metallicity [Fe/H]	−0.13 dex
Rotational velocity (v sin i)	105 km/s
Age	1.4 Gyr

δ Cap Ab
Mass	0.65 M_{☉}
Radius	0.65 or 0.9 R_{☉}
Temperature	4,200 or 4,500 K
Age	1.4 Gyr

Other designations
- Deneb Algedi, Deneb Algiedi, Scheddi, δ Cap, Del Cap, 49 Capricorni, BD−16 5943, FK5 819, GJ 837, HD 207098, HIP 107556, HR 8322, SAO 164644, ADS 15314, WDS 21470-1608

Database references
SIMBAD	data

Delta Capricorni is the brightest star in the constellation of Capricornus, the Sea Goat. It is a binary star system whose components are seen to eclipse each other, known as an eclipsing binary. The baseline apparent magnitude is 2.81, and during the primary and secondary eclipse it dims to 3.05 and 2.90, respectively. The system lies at a distance of 38.7 light-years (11.9 pc), based on parallax measurements.

The two components of this system are designated Delta Capricorni Aa and Delta Capricorni Ab. The former is the primary and has the proper name Deneb Algedi, pronounced /ˌdɛnɛb ælˈdʒiːdiː/; the traditional name of the system.

Delta Capricorni is positioned 2.6 degrees south of the ecliptic and can be occulted by the Moon, and (rarely) by planets.

== Nomenclature ==
δ Capricorni (Latinised to Delta Capricorni, abbreviated Delta Cap or δ Cap) is the system's Bayer designation. The designations of the three constituents as Delta Capricorni A, B and C, and those of A's components – Delta Capricorni Aa and Ab – derive from the convention used by the Washington Multiplicity Catalog (WMC) for multiple star systems, and adopted by the International Astronomical Union (IAU).

The system bore the traditional names Deneb Algedi, derived from the Arabic ذنب الجدي (ðanab al-jady), meaning "the tail of the goat", referring to the fishlike tail of the celestial sea-goat Capricorn, and Scheddi. In 2016, the International Astronomical Union organized a Working Group on Star Names (WGSN) to catalogue and standardize proper names for stars. The WGSN decided to attribute proper names to individual stars rather than entire multiple systems. It approved the name Deneb Algedi for the component Delta Capricornii Aa on February 1, 2017 and it is now so included in the List of IAU-approved Star Names.

In Chinese astronomy, Delta Capricorni is known as 壘壁陣四 (Lěi Bì Zhèn sì), meaning 'The Fourth Star of the Line of Ramparts'. This refers to its presence among an asterism known as 'The Line of Ramparts', which also includes Kappa Capricorni, Epsilon Capricorni, Gamma Capricorni, Iota Aquarii, Lambda Aquarii, Sigma Aquarii, Phi Aquarii, 27 Piscium, 29 Piscium, 33 Piscium and 30 Piscium.

== Observational history ==
In 1906 astronomer Vesto Slipher of Lowell Observatory discovered that Delta Capricorni A was a spectroscopic binary. The orbit was determined in 1921 by Clifford Crump using 69 radial velocity measurements obtained at Yerkes Observatory. However the eclipsing binary nature of the system was not discovered until 1956 by Olin J. Eggen at Lick Observatory.

Lunar occultations have been observed in 1951, 1962, and 1988.

Delta Capricorni was recognised as a metallic-line star in 1957 and included in a 1958 catalog of magnetic stars. It has also been associated with extreme ultraviolet and radio sources, believed to be from coronal activity in the secondary star.

== Stellar system ==
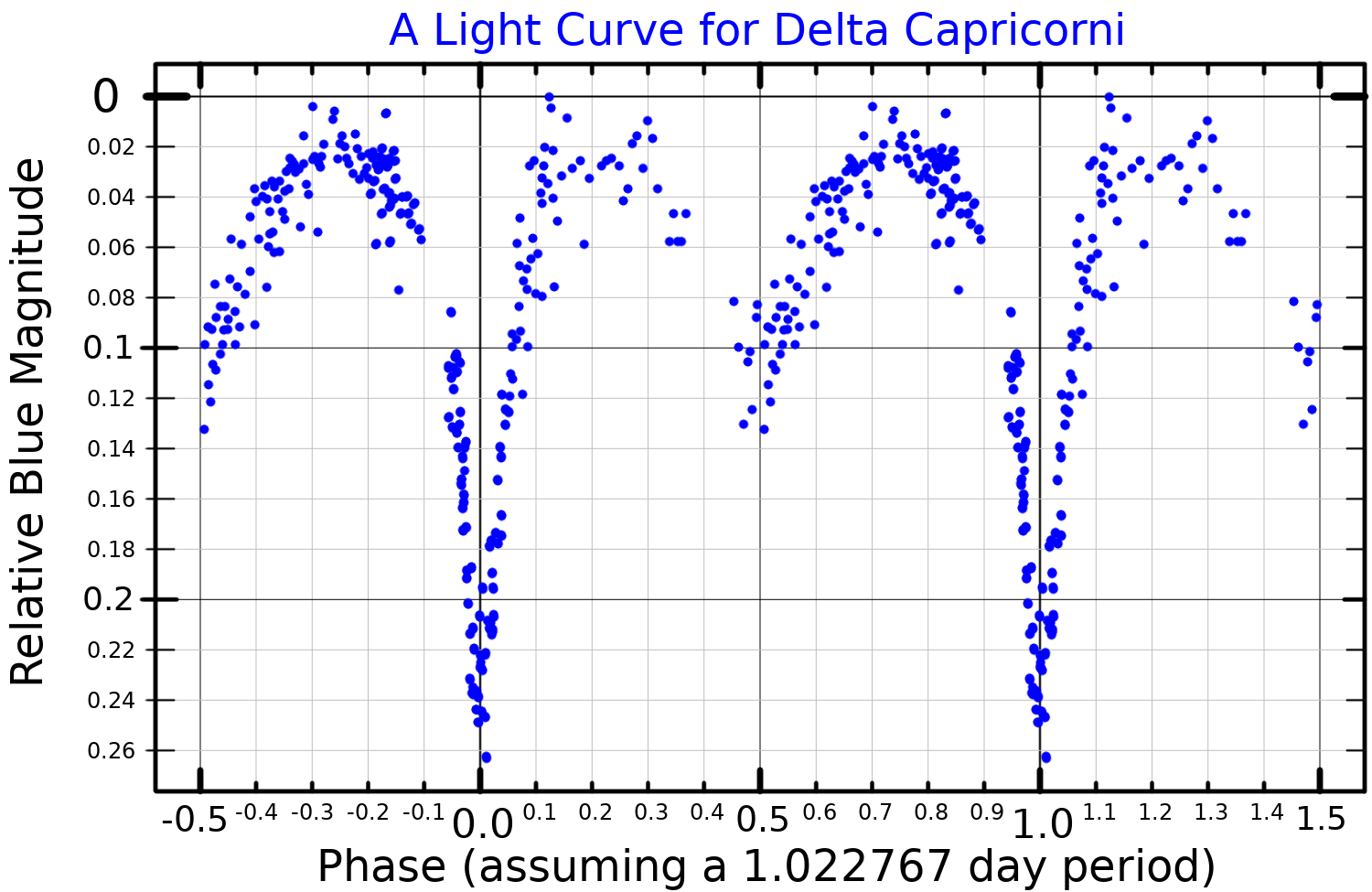
A blue band light curve for Delta Capricorni, adapted from Lloyd and Wonnacott (1994)

Delta Capricorni A is an Algol-type eclipsing binary star, with an orbital period of 1.022768 days and an inclination close to the line of sight from the Earth. The peak apparent visual magnitude of the pair is 2.81. During an eclipse of the primary, this magnitude drops by 0.24. When the primary is eclipsing the secondary, the magnitude decreases by 0.09. At a distance of 38.7 light-years (11.87 parsecs), it is the closest-known eclipsing binary.

Delta Capricorni A has an overall stellar classification of A7m III, which would indicate that it is a giant star that has exhausted the supply of hydrogen at its core, but it is actually on the main sequence. More specifically, this is a chemically-peculiar Am star with a spectral type of kA5hF0mF2 III under the revised MK system. This notation indicates that the calcium K-line matches the temperature of an A5 star, the hydrogen spectral type matches an F0 star, and the metallic absorption lines match an F2 star.

In the past this star was suspected of being a Delta Scuti variable, which is rare for an Am star. This categorization was brought into question during observations in 1994 and it is most likely not inherently variable. The primary has double the Sun's mass and 1.87 times its radius. It is rotating rapidly with a projected rotational velocity of 105 km s^{−1}. (This rotation rate is synchronous with the orbital period.) Note that it is unusual for an Am star to have such a high rotational velocity. The outer envelope of the star is radiating energy at an effective temperature of 7,000 K, giving it the white-hued glow of an A-type star. The secondary component is a G-type or K-type star with around 90% of the mass of the Sun. The primary star appears to be overmassive, and the secondary bloated, when compared to predictions of theorethical evolution models, suggesting that the stars have undergone mass transfer events in the past, which affected their original characteristics.

There are two optical companions. A fifteenth magnitude star is one arcminute away, and a thirteenth magnitude star is over two arcminutes away from the primary star and that distance is increasing. Both are line-of-sight coincidences lying at distances over 1,000 light-years.

== In culture ==
According to astrology, Delta Capricorni's representation of a flexible tail is reflected in its association with both good and bad fortune alike. It was one of the fifteen Behenian stars of medieval astrology, associated with chalcedony, marjoram and the kabbalistic symbol.

== See also ==
- Alpha Capricorni
- Deneb
