= Lambda Aquarii =

Star in the constellation Aquarius

- Location of λ Aquarii (circled)

Observation data Epoch J2000 Equinox ICRS
- Constellation: Aquarius
- Right ascension: 22^{h} 52^{m} 36.87404^{s}
- Declination: −07° 34′ 46.5489″
- Apparent magnitude (V): 3.57 to 3.80

Characteristics
- Evolutionary stage: AGB
- Spectral type: M2.5 IIIa Fe–1
- U−B color index: +1.721
- B−V color index: +1.641
- Variable type: Lb

Astrometry
Radial velocity (R_{v})	−10.46±0.53 km/s
Proper motion (μ)	RA: +14.964 mas/yr Dec.: +32.742 mas/yr
Parallax (π)	8.9360±0.2356 mas
Distance	365 ± 10 ly (112 ± 3 pc)
Absolute magnitude (M_{V})	−1.5

Details
Mass	2.96±0.5 M_{☉}
Radius	100.17+2.67 −2.81 R_{☉}
Luminosity	1,716 L_{☉}
Temperature	3,702 K
Metallicity [Fe/H]	−2.25 dex

Other designations
- Shatabhisha, Hydor, λ Aqr, 73 Aqr, BD−08°968, FK5 864, HD 216386, HIP 112961, HR 8698, SAO 146362

Database references
SIMBAD	data

Lambda Aquarii, Latinized from λ Aquarii and formally named Shatabhisha /ʃɑːtɑːbiːʃɑː/, is a variable star in the equatorial constellation of Aquarius. The apparent visual magnitude of this star ranges from 3.57 down to 3.80, which is bright enough to be visible with the naked eye. The star is eclipsed by the sun from about 1-4 March; thus the star can be viewed the whole night, crossing the sky, in early September, in the current epoch. Lambda Aquarii is located at a distance of 365 light-years (112 pc) from the Sun based on parallax, but is drifting closer with a radial velocity of −10.5 km/s.

This star lies just 0.39 degrees south of the ecliptic and so is subject to lunar and planetary occultations. On 16 April 2014, it was occulted by Venus as viewed from Australia, New Zealand and the West Pacific.

== Naming ==
The name Lambda Aquarii is Latinized from the Bayer designation λ Aquarii, and abbreviated Lambda Aqr or λ Aqr.

This star has been called Hydor (/ˈhaɪdɔːr/) from the ancient Greek Ὕδωρ "water", a name given by Proclus, according to Richard Hinckley Allen. Another Greek name for the star is Ekkhysis, from εκχυσις "outpouring". These names originally referred to a constellation of faint stars in the region of Aquarius and Cetus; they were associated with this star by Bayer's Uranometria (1603) and Allen's Star Names (1899).

In Indian astronomy, this is the main star of the nakshatra Śatabhiṣa or Shatabhisha (spelled Catabhisaj by Allen), meaning "a hundred physicians". Some sources instead attribute this name to γ Aquarii (Sadachbia), which is likely a reading or writing error. λ Aquarii also has the Tibetan name Mondru. The IAU Working Group on Star Names approved the name Shatabhisha for λ Aquarii on 22 September 2025 and it is now so entered in the IAU Catalog of Star Names. The name Hydor was officially adopted for another star in the historical constellation, 2 Ceti.

In Chinese astronomy, 壘壁陣 (Lěi Bì Zhèn), meaning Line of Ramparts, refers to an asterism consisting of λ Aquarii, κ Capricorni, ε Capricorni, γ Capricorni, δ Capricorni, ι Aquarii, σ Aquarii, φ Aquarii, 27 Piscium, 29 Piscium, 33 Piscium and 30 Piscium. Consequently, λ Aquarii itself is 壘壁陣七 (Lěi Bì Zhèn qī, English: the Seventh Star of Line of Ramparts).

== Properties ==
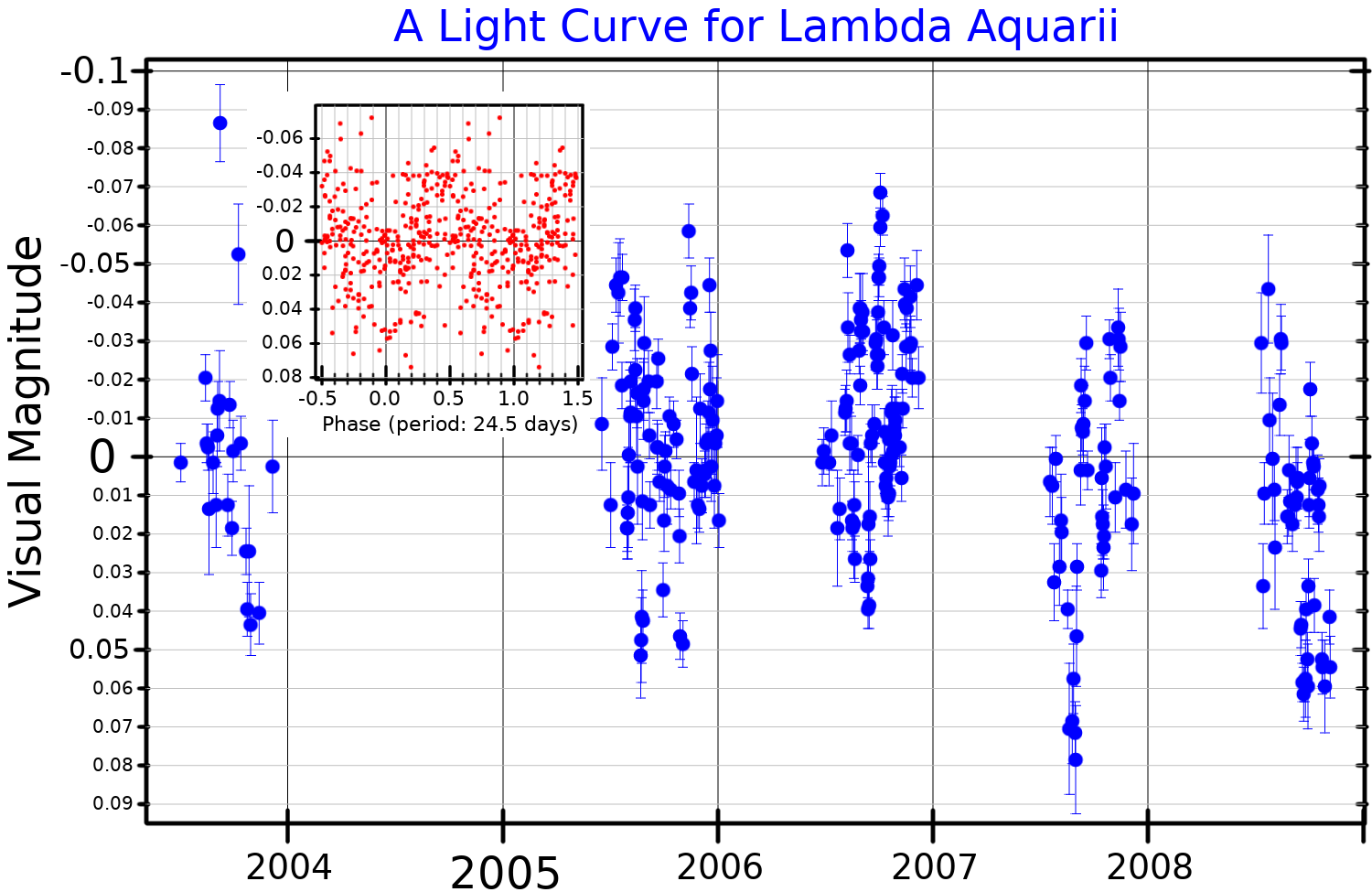
A visual band light curve for Lambda Aquarii, plotted from data published by Tabur et al. (2009). The inset plot shows the same data folded with a period of 24.5 days, after a linear trend had been removed.

The stellar classification of Lambda Aquarii is M2.5 IIIa Fe–1, indicating this is an aging red giant star with an underabundance of iron showing in its spectrum. This star is on the asymptotic giant branch and is generating energy through the nuclear fusion of hydrogen and helium along concentric shells surrounding an inert core of carbon and oxygen. With 3.6 times the mass of the Sun, it has expanded to 100 times the Sun's radius.

Lambda Aquarii has a magnetic field with an effective strength measured at 220±60 Gauss. It is classified as slow irregular variable and pulsation periods of 24.5, 32.0, and 49.5 days have been identified. On average, it is radiating nearly 1,600 times the luminosity of the Sun from the photosphere at an effective temperature of 3,702 K.

A faint companion star was detected by speckle interferometry during observations of a lunar occultation in 2016. It is likely an F-type main-sequence star that is gravitationally bound to Lambda Aquarii.
