= Gamma Capricorni =

Star in the constellation Capricornus

γ Capricorni
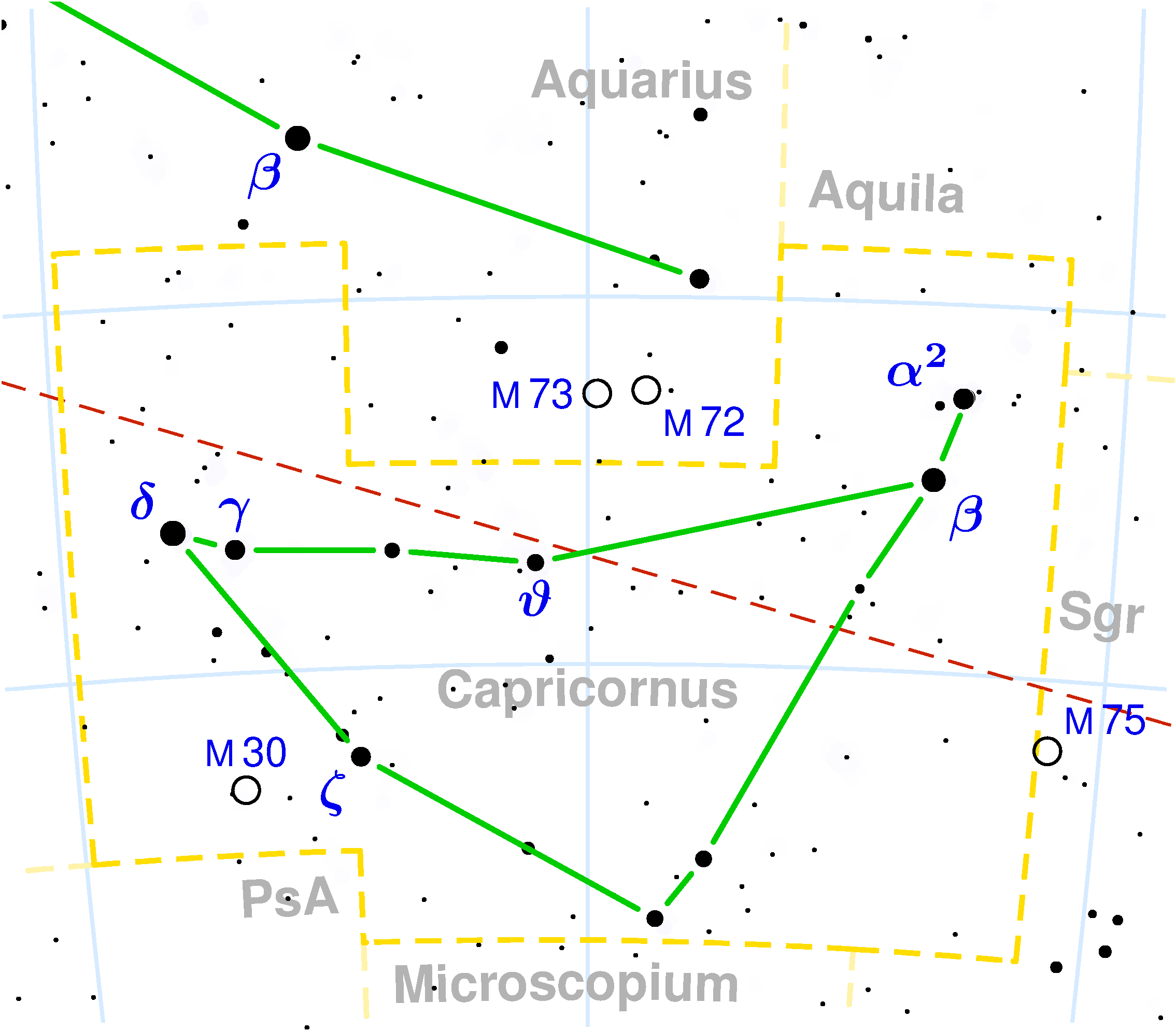
- Location of γ Capricorni (circled)

Observation data Epoch J2000 Equinox ICRS
- Constellation: Capricornus
- Right ascension: 21^{h} 40^{m} 05.445^{s}
- Declination: −16° 39′ 44.54″
- Apparent magnitude (V): +3.67

Characteristics
- Spectral type: kF0hF1VmF2
- U−B color index: +0.22
- B−V color index: +0.32
- Variable type: α^{2} CVn

Astrometry
Radial velocity (R_{v})	−31.2±0.5 km/s
Proper motion (μ)	RA: +200.193 mas/yr Dec.: −9.578 mas/yr
Parallax (π)	19.1037±0.6765 mas
Distance	171 ± 6 ly (52 ± 2 pc)
Absolute magnitude (M_{V})	+2.60

Details
Mass	2.44 M_{☉}
Radius	2.35 R_{☉}
Luminosity	33 L_{☉}
Surface gravity (log g)	3.69 cgs
Temperature	7,520 K
Metallicity [Fe/H]	+0.5 dex
Rotational velocity (v sin i)	40 km/s
Age	1.0 Gyr

Other designations
- Nashira, Gamma Cap, Gam Cap, γ Cap, 40 Capricorni, BD−17°6340, FK5 812, GJ 4209, HD 206088, HIP 106985, HR 8278, SAO 164560

Database references
SIMBAD	data

Gamma Capricorni is a star in the constellation of Capricornus. It has the proper name Nashira, pronounced (/ˈnæʃɪrə/); Gamma Capricorni is its Bayer designation. Based on parallax measurements, it is located at a distance of approximately 171 light-years (52 pc) from the Sun. The star is drifting closer with a radial velocity of −31 km/s. It is 2.56 degrees south of the ecliptic, so it can be occulted by the Moon, and (rarely) by planets.

== Nomenclature ==
γ Capricorni (Latinised to Gamma Capricorni) is the star's Bayer designation.

It bore the traditional name Nashira, derived from the Arabic سعد ناشرة sa'd nashirah "the lucky one" or "bearer of good news". In 2016, the International Astronomical Union organized a Working Group on Star Names (WGSN) to catalogue and standardize proper names for stars. The WGSN approved the name Nashira for this star on 21 August 2016 and it is now so included in the List of IAU-approved Star Names.

In Chinese, 壘壁陣 (Lěi Bì Zhèn), meaning Line of Ramparts, refers to an asterism consisting of Gamma Capricorni, Kappa Capricorni, Epsilon Capricorni, Delta Capricorni, Iota Aquarii, Sigma Aquarii, Lambda Aquarii, Phi Aquarii, 27 Piscium, 29 Piscium, 33 Piscium and 30 Piscium. Consequently, the Chinese name for Gamma Capricorni itself is 壘壁陣三 (Lěi Bì Zhèn sān, English: the Third Star of Line of Ramparts).

=== Namesake ===
Nashira (AK-85) was a United States Navy ship, though it was never commissioned and never bore the USS designation.

== Properties ==
γ Capricorni is classified as a hot chemically peculiar Am star with a mean apparent magnitude of +3.67. The spectrum displays abundance anomalies of the elements strontium, chromium, and europium. It was first classified as an Am star in 1965 by K. Osawa, but in 1974 C. Bertaud and M. Floquet found it to be an Ap star with a strontium abundance anomaly. In 1998, F. A. Catalano and associates found a slight variability in the infrared J band with a period of 2.78 days, which suggests the Ap classification is correct. However, no magnetic field is detected, which points to the Am classification, as does the infrared spectrum.

The star displays large radial velocity variations, which could be explained by star spots and rotation. Alternatively it may be a double-lined spectroscopic binary viewed from nearly pole-on. This star is classified as an α^{2} Canum Venaticorum type variable star and its brightness varies by 0.03 magnitudes. It has 2.44 times the mass and 2.35 times the radius of the Sun. O. J. Eggen included it as a member of the Hyades Stream.
