= Verytex =

1991 video game

- Developer: Opera House (Note: Additional work by ISCO.)
- Publisher: Asmik Ace Entertainment
- Producer: Toshiyuki Futamura
- Designers: Hidefumi Ohara; Satoru Ichihara; Shinji Nakamura
- Programmers: Hideki Tanji; Hiroyuki Fujiwara; Satoru Miki
- Artists: Atsuhiro Gunji; Hiroshi Akagi; Ken Takagi
- Composers: Hitoshi Sakimoto; Masaharu Iwata; Yoshio Furukawa
- Platform: Mega Drive
- Release: JP: 5 April 1991
- Genre: Scrolling shooter
- Mode: Single-player

Verytex (Note: Japanese: ヴェリテックス, Hepburn: Vu~eritekkusu) is a vertically scrolling shooter video game developed by Opera House, with the assistance of ISCO, and published by Asmik Ace Entertainment exclusively for the Mega Drive in Japan on 5 April 1991. Taking place on the colonized fictional planet of Syracuse in a futuristic sci-fi setting, where its military force initiated a violent coup d'état against the inhabitants for unknown reasons, players take control of the titular space fighter craft in an attempt to overthrow the enemies, protect civilization and discover the true cause for the rebellion.

Headed by Air Diver producer Toshiyuki Futamura, Verytex was created by most of the same team that previously worked on several projects such as the Mega Drive conversion of Master of Monsters. Despite being exclusive to Japan, the game has received mixed reviews from critics and from reviewers that reviewed it as an import title, who felt divided in regards to several areas of the title such as the presentation, graphics, sound design, controls and gameplay, although the music was noted by some people as a positive point.

== Gameplay ==
Gameplay screenshot

Verytex is a vertically scrolling shoot 'em up game similar to Raiden Trad and Twin Cobra, where players take control of the titular space fighter craft through six stages in order protect civilization by defeating the rebellious military force of planet Syracuse and discover the true reason for their cause as the main objective. The game has an easy to learn weapon system with three weapons and three power-up levels for each, shield pick-up icons and the option to shift the ship's speed to three levels. Players have to fight multiple types of enemies across each stage and face a boss at the end of each one with the occasional mini-boss between. It is known among players for its particularly infamous and difficult final boss.

Among the pick-up icons, the players have a choice of only three weapons, a side-weapon and a shield. The ship's default weapon is the Normal Shot, a basic straight-firing Vulcan weapon that spread-out in five directions with part of the spread coming from behind the ship, as well as the Beam Shot that doubles in shot-count and grows in size once upgraded and the Boomerang Shot, a wave-type weapon that fires from the side of the ship once fully upgraded. The stages are long and all of them have a checkpoint system involved when losing a live, where players are sent to the last checkpoint reached. The game also gives a limited number of lives at the beginning with no extend bonuses and once all lives are lost, the game is over but a continue option is available on the main menu.

== Synopsis ==
Verytex takes place in a futuristic sci-fi setting, where mankind has finally developed the technology necessary to advance from Earth and maintain numerous colonies to great success across various planets, none of which had any established extraterrestrial existence prior to colonization. The most prosperous planet colony had been set on the planet Syracuse, where human technology (and apparently linguistics) flourished. However, a distress signal coming from the location claiming that the flagship of their army, the Aphrodite, initiated a violent rebellion against the people and its passengers refused to make any demands or reason was received, with the player being dispatched from headquarters in the middle of outer space to Syracuse in the titular space fighter craft to stop the battle and find its true cause.

== Development and release ==
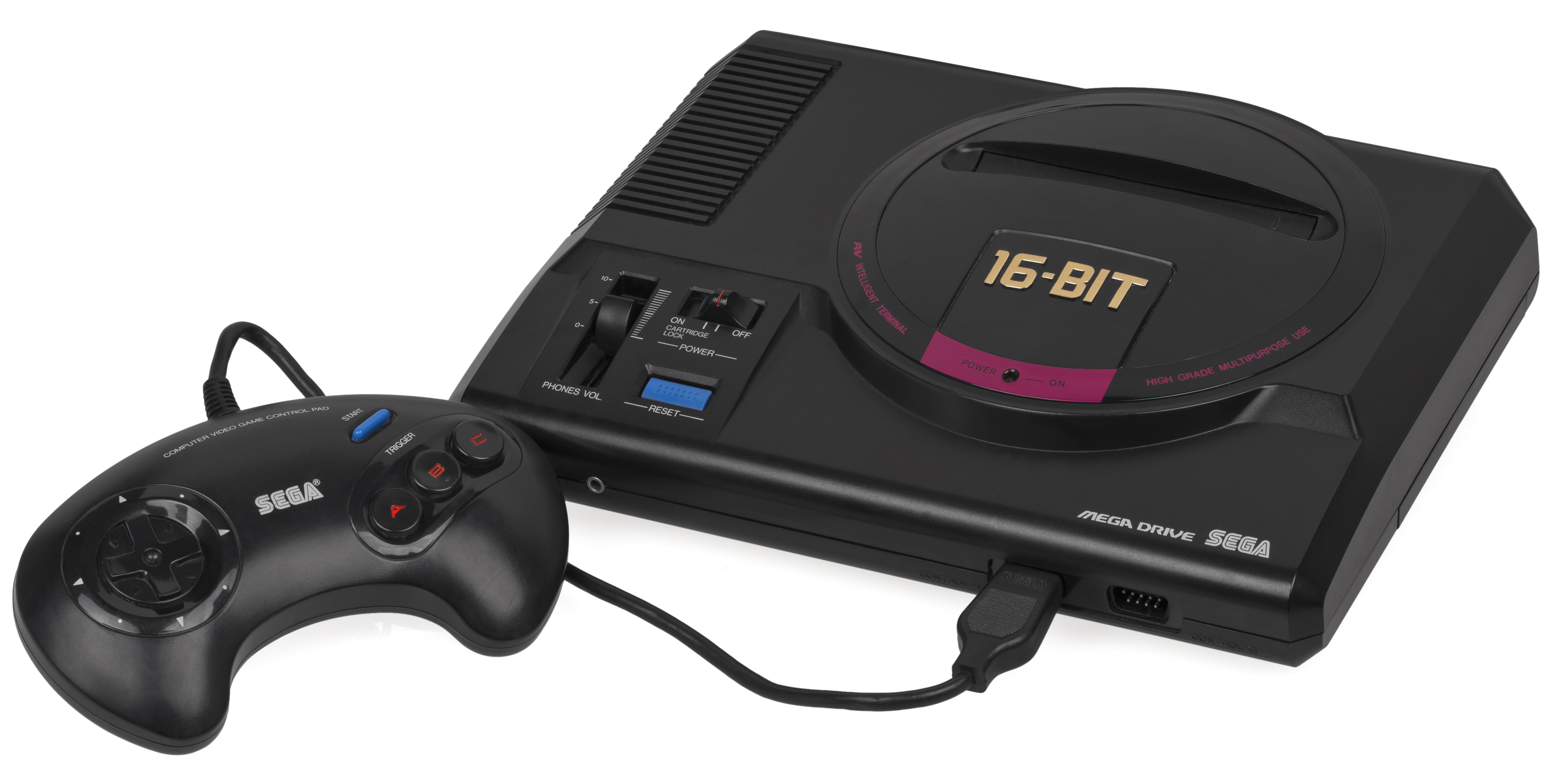
Verytex was created by most of the same staff who previously worked on Air Diver and Master of Monsters for Mega Drive.

Verytex was developed by Opera House, with additional work assistance from ISCO, and its creation was handled by most of the same team that worked on several projects such as the Mega Drive conversion of Master of Monsters, although the former developer is not credited as such in the credits of the game, nor in the instruction manual. The production was headed by Air Diver producer Toshiyuki Futamura alongside Hiroshi Jimbo and Shigeki Saka, the latter of which previously served as director on Midnight Resistance for Mega Drive. Hidefumi Ohara, Satoru Ichihara and Shinji Nakamura served as its designers while artists Atsuhiro Gunji, Hiroshi Akagi and Ken Takagi were responsible for the pixel art in addition of Hideki Tanji, Hiroyuki Fujiwara and Satoru Miki, who worked as the game's programmers.

Both the music and sound effects were created by composers Hitoshi Sakimoto, Masaharu Iwata and Yoshio Furukawa, using a proprietary sound driver written by the former called "Terpsichorean" that was implemented in subsequent Mega Drive releases like Devilish. Verytex was published by Asmik Ace Entertainment exclusively in Japan on 5 April 1991.

== Reception ==
Reception

Aggregate score
Aggregator	Score
GameRankings	50%

Review scores
Publication	Score
Aktueller Software Markt	6 / 12
Beep! Mega Drive	23 / 40
Consoles +	84%
Famitsu	58%
HonestGamers	2.5/5
Joystick	85% 85%
Mega Drive Advanced Gaming	53%
MegaTech	73%
Power Play	66%
Raze	79%
Sega Power	4/5
Sega Pro	80 / 100
Tilt	17 / 20
Video Games	66%

Verytex received mixed reception since its release. In retrospective reviews, the reviews have also been mixed.
