= Mysterium (video game) =

1991 video game

- Developer: Maxis Software
- Publisher: Asmik Ace Entertainment
- Platform: Game Boy
- Release: NA: July 1991
- Genre: Role-playing
- Mode: Single-player

Mysterium is a first person dungeon crawl game developed by Maxis and published by Asmik Ace Entertainment in February 1991 for the Nintendo Game Boy.

== Plot ==
You have come to the famous alchemist Hermetrix and been accepted as his apprentice. Hermetrix has sent you to be tested in the Mysterium, a 3D maze of hallways full of traps, rivals and monsters. Your task is to rescue a civilization of giant ants and Candmia, the alchemist who tried before you and failed in the test. Your primary objective is to find Morda, a giant female ant who has been captured by a dastardly beast in the world of Mysterium. You’ve drawn the assignment of tracking her down, defeating the monster, and returning Morda to safety. When you have mastered the art of alchemy, you may succeed in the final test.

== Characters ==
The main characters of Mysterium:

- Hermetrix - A mysterious alchemist who is well-known for his skills.
- Candmia - The alchemist who failed in the test of Hemetrix and now is trapped in the Mysterium.
- Morda - The queen of giant ants who has been kidnapped by a monster. She's held in a prison somewhere in the Mysterium.

=== Enemies ===
- Cobra - Lethal, but not as strong as it seems.
- Python - Faster and stronger than the cobra.
- Ghost - The remaining souls of those who died in the mysterium.
- Plant - A man-eating plant, waiting to taste your flesh.
- Hydor - The guardian of Mysterium. A powerful and violent creature with the body of a snake and the head of a dragon, who has kidnapped Morda. His tail is able to kill the player with one hit, and his hard skin is able to resist any attack.
- Homunculus -

== Gameplay ==
To complete the task, the player must solve the mazes to pass through. To solve the mazes, the player must also transform the items which are found in the maze into something more useful. In order to succeed, the player must combine metals and minerals in pools of mercury, water, fire and acid to create any item they need. For example, a piece of iron turns into a glass key when dropped in a pool of fire. Thus, if they want to pass a glass door, the player must find a pool of fire and a piece of iron. These transformations are not random, but sometimes require multiple stages to complete. Therefore, it is advisable to keep notes on the transformations and their results.

The game is non-linear, allowing the player to choose which areas to approach. The maze levels are difficult to navigate and it is possible to get lost in the maze.

=== Actions ===
The main actions in the game are:

- Transform a material into an item.
- Transform a material into a weapon (iron, bronze etc).
- Destroy the selected item or weapon using acid.
- Destroy a needless material.
- Transform an item to a weapon or the opposite.

=== Keys ===
There are seven types of keys that can be made

Key Type	Base Material(s)	Mix With
Glass	Sand	Mercury
Bronze	Bronze	Fire
Iron	Iron	Fire
Steel	Iron	Mercury
Gold	Iron Key + Steel Key	Fire
Silver	Bronze Key	Fire, then water
Platinum	???	???

=== Weapons ===
Weapon	Base Material(s)
Sword	Iron & Bronze
Dagger	Iron & Bronze
Axe	Iron or Bronze

== Reception ==
Reception

Review score
Publication	Score
Electronic Gaming Monthly	5/7/4/5

The four reviewers for Electronic Gaming Monthly offered mixed opinions on the game.

== See also ==
- List of Game Boy games
