= Asmik-kun World 2 =

1991 video game

- Cover art
- Developer: Cyclone System
- Publisher: Asmik Ace Entertainment
- Composer: Dota Ando
- Series: Asmik-kun World
- Platform: Game Boy
- Release: JP: May 24, 1991
- Genre: Action
- Mode: Single-player

Asmik-kun World 2 (アスミッくん ワールド 2 Asumikkun Wārudo 2) is a 1991 puzzle video game developed by Cyclone System and published by Asmik for the Game Boy. Unlike its predecessor, Boomer's Adventure in ASMIK World (Teke! Teke! Asmik-kun World), this game was never released outside Japan. Like its predecessor, the game is an example of the trap-em-up genre, which also includes games like Heiankyo Alien and Space Panic.

In the game, Asmik-kun has to build a "road" from the entrance to the exit in each level. An enemy has come to kidnap the children on a certain world and the "roads" are intended for the children to be rescued and escorted safely back home.
