= Asmik-kun Land =

1991 video game

- Cover art
- Developer: Graphic Research
- Publisher: Asmik
- Composers: Makiko Ito (composer); Fumito Tamayama (producer)
- Series: Asmik-kun Land
- Platform: Family Computer
- Release: JP: December 20, 1991
- Genre: Action
- Mode: Single-player

Asmik-kun Land (アスミッくん ランド Asumikkun Rando') is an action platform video game published by Asmik for the Family Computer in 1991.

A pink dinosaur named Asmik-kun (named "Boomer" in the English release of Boomer's Adventure in ASMIK World) seeks to recover six fragments so he can wake the dragon ruler of the world and make Asmik Land a paradise.
