= HR3 =

hr3 is a German radio station.

HR3 may refer to:

- 33 Piscium, a star in the constellation Pisces, also known as HR 3
- H. R. 3, No Taxpayer Funding for Abortion Act, a U.S. bill in the 112th Congress
- Croatian Radio 3, a radio station in Croatia
