= D-Force =

1991 video game

- North American cover art
- Developer: Cream
- Publisher: Asmik
- Platform: Super NES
- Release: JP: December 20, 1991; NA: December 1991
- Genre: Scrolling shooter
- Mode: Single-player

D-Force (Note: Known as Dimension Force (Japanese: ディメンションフォース, Hepburn: Dimenshon Fōsu) in Japan.) is a 1991 vertically scrolling shooter video game developed and published in Japan by Asmik for the Super Famicom and later localized and published in North America by Asmik Corporation of America for the Super NES. It involves an Apache helicopter set on defeating an evil Middle Eastern dictator. There are seven levels which feature six countries. Some of the levels involve switching altitudes in order to attack enemies from a different height, which uses Mode 7, one of the main features of the Super NES.

== Gameplay ==
The main menu splits the game up into three sections; "Game Start," "Shooting Mode," and "Exploration Mode."

Game Start plays through all of the game's seven levels. Shooting Mode plays only the first, third, and fifth levels where consistent shooting and dodging enemy fire is the main focus. These levels are also the only levels that feature the ability to gain bullet and missile power-ups to the helicopter. "Exploration Mode" plays only the second, fourth, and sixth levels which involve switching altitudes to shoot down certain enemies and avoid obstacles. Only the Game Start mode plays the seventh and final level in addition to the game's first six levels.

Gameplay involves being the pilot of an Apache Helicopter, and shooting enemies down in the style of a vertical scrolling shooter. Large red gunships can be shot down to gain power-ups for the helicopter in order to upgrade the guns and have it fire homing missiles. Each level features a midboss and a boss, and both must be destroyed in order to advance to the next level. The style of the levels as the player advances alternates between "Shooting Mode" and "Exploration Mode," where the latter involves levels set in a fantasy-like setting and are the only level types that provide no power-ups to the player and give the player the ability to switch their altitude.

== Music ==
The music played at the menu is a variation of the French national anthem "La Marseillaise". The music played at the ending credits is a variation of the Soviet Union national anthem.

== Reception ==
Reception

Review scores
| Publication | Score |
|---|---|
| Famitsu | 18/40 |
| Games-X | 2/5 |
| Super Play | 210 |
| Total! | 67% |
| Control | 61% |
| Electric Brain | 75% |
| Hippon Super! | 3/10 |
| SNES Force | 44% |
| The Super Famicom | B- |
| Super Action | 23% |
| Super Pro | 23% |

D-Force garnered average reviews from critics. Game Players's Matthew A. Firme opined that the game's visuals were an improvement over the Nintendo Entertainment System, writing that "What it may lack in graphics, D-Force certainly makes up for in enthusiam". Famitsu's four reviewers found the ability to switch between low and high altitudes in technical mode surprising, but noted how difficult was powering-up the helicopter and fast movement of enemy bullets. They also saw both the helicopter's movement and spawning of enemies confusing and unnatural respectively.

Games-X magazine criticized D-Force for its graphical presentation, particularly the "bland" sprites and poor rotation effects, as well as the monotonous sound effects, and below average gameplay. They stated that "This is anything but the best shoot’em-up on the [Super] Famicom and you'd be better off avoiding it and trying your hand at Gradius 3 instead, a truly class game." Nintendo Power's George Sinfield and Rob Noel liked the background visuals but they felt that it did not offered any innovation compared to other vertical-scrolling shooters on NES. Sinfield also expressed that it played like "a bunch of games made for NES".

In a retrospective outlook, Retronauts writer Jeremy Parish stated that D-Force "might be the worst and most generic shooter ever released for Super NES."
