= ISCO (videogame developer) =

Videogame Developer

ISCO (イスコ), short for "Intelligent System Corporation" was a video game developer company, with many of its games subcontracted down to other developers.

== Games developed ==
=== Arcade ===
- ピザストーリー (year unknown; genre ETC)

=== Famicom ===
- Transformers: Mystery of Convoy (for Takara; 1986)

=== Genesis ===
- Midnight Resistance (for Data East; subcontracted to Opera House; 1990)
- Verytex (for Asmik; subcontracted to Opera House; 1991)
- Two Crude Dudes (for Data East; subcontracted to Opera House; 1991)
- Master of Monsters (for Toshiba EMI; subcontracted to Opera House; 1991)
- Captain America and the Avengers (for Data East; subcontracted to Opera House; 1992)

=== Game Gear ===
- Side Pocket (for Data East; subcontracted to Opera House; 1994)

=== Saturn ===
- マイ・ベスト・フレンズ (My Best Friends: St. Andrew Jogakuin Hen (for Atlus; 1996)?)
- Game-Ware 3 Gou (ピピットボーイの大冒険3) (for General Entertainment; 1996)
- AI Igo (for ASCII Something Good; 1997)
- Game-Ware 4 Gou (窓拭き職人ゴンドラ君) (for General Entertainment; 1997)
- GW4（ピピットボーイの大冒険4） (page says Game-Ware 4 Gou, picture shows Game-Ware 5 Gou)
- Deep Fear ("ムービー" (video production?) and PAL conversion) (for Sega; 1998)

=== TurboGrafx-16 ===
- Drop Off (for Data East; subcontracted to Cream; 1990)

=== Windows, Unknown Publisher ===
- 映画監督物語 (simulation game) (KSS?)
- お父さんのための競馬2 (simulation game)
- お父さんのための競馬 (simulation game)
