= Deep Fear =

1998 video game

- European cover art
- Developer: System Sacom (Note: Co-developed with Sega CS2. Additional work by Highwaystar and ISCO.)
- Publisher: Sega
- Directors: Hiroyuki Maruhama; Kunihiro Shirahata
- Producers: Noriyoshi Ohba; Rieko Kodama; Koichi Sato
- Designers: Mitsunori Yamazaki; Teku Kobayashi
- Artists: Emi Konno; Yasushi Nirasawa
- Writer: Yuzo Sugano
- Composer: Kenji Kawai
- Platform: Sega Saturn
- Release: JP: 16 July 1998; EU: 18 September 1998
- Genre: Survival horror
- Mode: Single-player

Deep Fear (Note: Dīpu Fiā (Japanese: ディープフィアー)) is a 1998 survival horror video game co-developed by System Sacom and Sega CS2, and published by Sega for the Sega Saturn. Set on the underwater Big Table research facility in the Pacific Ocean, the player controls John Mayor as an unknown infection begins transforming the facility staff into hostile mutants. John explores the Big Table, gathering items and resources while fighting enemies and looking for a way to escape the facility.

The game was designed as a science fiction take on the Japanese "Mansion Mystery" genre, with the aim being to create fear from the environments and monsters. Notable staff included co-producer Rieko Kodama, composer Kenji Kawai, and artist Yasushi Nirasawa as monster designer. The game met with generally positive reviews from critics; praise was given to its music and elements of its gameplay−which was often compared to Resident Evil, while reactions to its graphics were mixed and the voice acting was panned. A rumored North American release never manifested.

== Gameplay ==
Combat in Deep Fear; protagonist John Mayor fights a mutant

Deep Fear is a survival horror video game where players take on the role of John Mayor fighting mutants that are overrunning the Big Table underwater research base. John and other characters and enemies are portrayed using 3D models, while the environments are pre-rendered and shown through fixed camera angles. John is controlled through both traditional tank controls, or with full analogue control using the Saturn's 3D Pad gamepad. The player navigates the Big Table, completing missions by finding certain characters and mission-related items, managing ammunition and resources such as first aid kits, and fighting enemies scattered through the environment.

Combat relies on guns, with John having limited movement while his weapon is drawn. New weapons can be found at lockers scattered through the Big Table, which also allow the player to restock ammunition. John can also carry one powerful "Special" weapon at a time. A key mechanic in-game is that each area in the Big Table has a limited air supply, which is depleted over time and decreases quicker with gunfire. The air supply must be recharged at Air System terminals, with different areas having different air level limits to manage. The player must also use a breathing mask with limited air to explore underwater areas. The Air System terminals also act as save points. The player meets a game over if John's health is depleted by enemies, John's breath runs out, or local air supply runs out.

== Synopsis ==
A space capsule from Project Mercury, presumed lost for forty years crashes into the Pacific Ocean. A US Navy submarine picks up the capsule and brings it to the Big Table, an underwater research facility. Four months later, Emergency Rescue Service member John Mayor, recently transferred to run safety drills and currently suffering from a cold, investigates with his submersible pilot Mookie after contact is lost with the submarine's crew and it crashes into the Big Table's Navy area. The crash was revealed to be due to crewmembers mutating into hostile monsters. John and Mookie pick up Gena Wiseberg, a researcher alongside her pet chimpanzee Anthony, and a sick officer of the submarine before the submarine fell into a chasm. The submarine officer later transforms after John disembarks and kills Mookie, sinking the submersible. The infection spreads onto the Big Table, mutating both the living and dead into monstrous creatures. Wiseberg discovers that Mayor's cold is preventing him from being infected. Under orders from the Big Table's controller Clancy Dawkins, Mayor works with both other survivors and a SEAL team to contain the infection. Their efforts, and the impact of the creatures, slowly cripples the Big Table.

The rest of the Big Table's personnel, including the SEAL team, are ultimately either mutated or killed aside from Mayor, Wiseberg and Dawkins. Dawkins, unhinged by events, attempts to escape in the remaining submersible but dies to a stowaway creature. Mayor and Wiseberg decide to detach the Navy area of the Big Table and use the moon capsule to reach the surface. The Big Table self-destructs, flipping over the Navy area. As Mayor tries to restore communications, Mayor learns that Wiseberg was conducting tests within the Big Table, supervised by Dawkins. Wiseberg reveals that Anthony is the source of the infection, having contracted radiation-mutated bacterium created during his forty years stuck within the space shuttle. Wiseberg hoped that the mutated bacteria could advance research into deep space travel and hibernation, while Dawkins hoped the project would allow him to return to Washington, having been exiled to the Big Table after a submarine accident. Mayor attempts to kill Anthony, which triggers Wiseberg's mutation into first a monstrous and then an angelic form. Mayor sets off the Navy area's self destruction sequence and uses the capsule to escape. When Anthony tries to follow, the defeated Wiseberg holds onto him, both dying when the Navy area self-destructs. Mayor, together with an uninfected dog, are rescued by the Navy.

== Development ==
Deep Fear was co-developed for the Sega Saturn by System Sacom and Sega CS2, later known as Overworks. The CGI graphics were created by Highwaystar, while game studio ISCO was in charge of movie production. Rieko Kodama, who had worked on multiple Sega projects, was invited to assist on the project as co-producer by Noriyoshi Ohba. Deep Fear was her return to leading game development after a period in management, and she enjoyed the experience of working with external developers and staff. System Sacom put together a team specially to design the game. Kodama described the game as a science fiction take on a "Mansion Mystery", a genre popular in Japan featuring mysteries set in a Western building. The goal was to evoke fear and horror from the environment as well as the monsters. Executive producer Youji Ishii stated the team's wish to emulate the gameplay of Resident Evil (1996), while co-director Kunihiro Shirahata cited John Carpenter's movie The Thing (1982) as inspiration for the narrative. The scenario was written by Yuzo Sugano.

The game's monsters were designed by noted artist Yasushi Nirasawa. He described the setting as "very movie-like and detailed", but had trouble with the designs due to conflicting requests for creatures that were both familiar and alien. He split the monster designs into three types; beings created through a "collage" of humans and something else, a "lost generation" second phase, and a stable and more alien design. He was dissatisfied with his final boss design, which strayed from the realistic approach taken with the other characters and monsters in favour of following developer requests. The characters were designed by Emi Konno. The music was composed and produced by Kenji Kawai. The music was kept for story sequences and boss battles, with ambient sounds dominating normal exploration and combat.

Deep Fear was published by Sega in Japan on 16 July 1998. To promote the game, Kodama and Tadashi Takezaki partnered with external PR companies to produce cinema commercials. A soundtrack album was released by Marvelous Entertainment on 17 July. The game was also released in Europe on 18 September. The PAL conversion was handled by ISCO. Deep Fear was the final Saturn game released in Europe. Speaking in a 2018 interview, Kodama was pleased that Deep Fear had a fan base, but felt that the game was "buried" due to its late release in the Saturn's life. A North American release was rumoured to be part of a "final batch" of Saturn titles before the release of the Dreamcast, but it ultimately went unreleased in the region.

== Reception ==
Reception

Review scores
Publication	Score
Edge	5/10
Famitsu	30/40
GameSpot	7.8/10
Jeuxvideo.com	14/20
Ação Games	9.5/10
Gamers	4/5
Gamer's Republic	C
Sega Magazin	92%
Sega Saturn Magazine	86%
Sega Saturn Magazine (JP)	8.33/10

Deep Fear saw positive reviews from Japanese and European publications, but English language reviews were more mixed. Reviewers frequently compared the game to Resident Evil, with some reviewers calling Deep Fear a poor imitator.

Japanese magazine Famitsu highlighted the tension created by the enclosed corridor environments, though one reviewer found controlling Mayor difficult. Sega Saturn Magazine (JP) likewise praised the tension created by the environments. GameSpot's James Mielke found the oxygen mechanic and underwater setting a refreshing take on the survival horror formula of the time. Edge appreciated the plot-driven progression, but disliked the lack of tension and felt the gameplay was hampered by the game's other issues. Jeuxvideo.com noted the ideas behind the game, but felt it was let down by poor level design and minor bugs. Sega Saturn Magazine (UK) enjoyed the gameplay for its challenge, but faulted its linear design and low replayability. Gamer's Republic faulted the gameplay for lacking originality in the genre.

Edge described the game as having "wooden FMVs and atrocious dialogue", while by contrast Sega Saturn Magazine (UK) lauded the graphics despite noting poor character animation. Gamer's Republic noted the storyline and setting as "unique" compared to the rest of the game. The voice acting was generally panned, with the exception of Mielke who called it better than the first two Resident Evil games. The music and ambient sound design met with praise when mentioned.

Bob Mackey, as part of a feature for 1UP.com on Resident Evil "rip-offs", gave praise to the use of air supply to add tension to the genre formula, and faulted Sega's decision not to publish in North America. As part of a feature for Retro Gamer on gaming in August 1998, Richard Burton positively noted the game's design, noting the use of audio when creating tension and that comparisons to Resident Evil were inevitable.

== See also ==
- List of underwater science fiction works
