= Jumpin' Kid: Jack to Mame no Ki Monogatari =

1990 video game

- Cover art
- Developer(s): Now Production
- Publisher(s): Asmik Ace Entertainment, Inc.
- Platform(s): Family Computer
- Release: JP: December 19, 1990
- Genre(s): Action
- Mode(s): Single-player

Jumpin' Kid: Jack to Mame no Ki Monogatari (ジャンピン・キッド ジャックと豆の木ものがたり, "Jumping Kid: The Tale of Jack and the Beanstalk") was released on December 19, 1990 in Japan for the Family Computer. A North American release was planned but ultimately scrapped. The game was popular in Poland, Russia via Famiclones.

== Gameplay ==
This video game is a variation of the famous fairy tale, "Jack and the Beanstalk". It is a challenging platform game that plays similar to Mega Man. Bean power-ups help to improve the player's attack, while springs are used to improve his jumping height.
