= Transformers: Mystery of Convoy =

1986 video game

- Developer: ISCO
- Publisher: Takara
- Programmer: Hiroshi Okamoto
- Series: Transformers
- Platform: Family Computer
- Release: JP: December 5, 1986
- Genre: Run and gun
- Modes: Single-player, multiplayer

Transformers: Mystery of Convoy (Note: Japanese: 戦え! 超ロボット生命体トランスフォーマー コンボイの謎(ナゾ), Hepburn: Tatakae! Chō Robotto Seimeitai Toransufōmā: Konboi no Nazo; lit. "Fight! Super Robot Life-Form Transformers: Mystery of Convoy") is a 1986 video game developed by ISCO and published by Takara in Japan for the Famicom. It is based on the Transformers toyline. The game was made available on the Wii's Virtual Console service on June 10, 2008.

The game stars Autobot protagonist Ultra Magnus. The titular Mystery is the identity of Optimus Prime's (known as "Convoy" in Japan) killer; the 1986 film did not see a Japanese theatrical release until 1989, and Mystery of Convoy was created to provide an explanation for Prime's death for the Japanese audience.

Upon release, Mystery of Convoy received negative reviews from critics for its level design and difficulty. Retrospective reviews have been similarly negative, and the game has garnered a reputation among retro gaming enthusiasts as a kusoge.

== Gameplay ==
The player controls Ultra Magnus, who must shoot his way through 10 horizontally and vertically scrolling levels consisting of various Decepticon enemies, with a boss fight at the end of each level. He can transform into a car carrier, which makes it easier for him to avoid enemy attacks, drive through narrow entrances and shoot enemies that are flying above him. Along the way, he can also pick up various power-ups which can give him wider ranging firepower or even the ability to fly. There are two Warp Zones within the game; they can be found by rescuing Bumblebee from the Decepticons.

The bosses for each level consist of mostly large Decepticon symbols in different color palettes. The only Deceptions Ultra Magnus actually fights are Menasor, Bruticus, Megatron (who for unexplained reasons is the penultimate boss), and Trypticon (known in Japan as Dinosaurer), the final boss.

Another playable character in the game is Rodimus Prime, who can be unlocked by collecting the letters that spell 'RODIMUS'. One letter is hidden in each level except 3, 6, and 10. However, though his vehicle mode has its own graphics, his robot-mode sprite is Ultra Magnus in Rodimus's palette.

== Other media ==
- Other The Transformers: Mystery of Convoy media
- Anime television series

Q Transformers: Mystery of Convoy Returns
- Directed by: Kōtarō Ishidate
- Written by: Kōtarō Ishidate
- Music by: Hajime (from LiLi); Jiro (from LiLi)
- Studio: DLE
- Original network: Tokyo MX, Niconico, YouTube
- Original run: January 6, 2015 – March 31, 2015
- Episodes: 13
- Anime television series

Q Transformers: The Road to Additional Popularity
- Directed by: Kōtarō Ishidate
- Written by: Kōtarō Ishidate
- Music by: Hajime (from LiLi); Jiro (from LiLi)
- Studio: DLE
- Original network: Tokyo MX, Niconico, YouTube
- Original run: July 6, 2015 – October 1, 2015
- Episodes: 13

=== Anime ===
In collaboration with the 30th anniversary of Transfomers - as well as the 35th anniversary of Choro-Q - a flash anime adaptation of the game, produced by DLE, titled Q Transformers: Mystery of Convoy Returns (キュートランスフォーマー 帰ってきたコンボイの謎, Kyū Toransufōmā Kaettekita Konboi no Nazo), began airing in Japan on January 6, 2015. The opening theme is "physical" by Oldcodex. A second season titled Q Transformers: The Road to Additional Popularity (キュートランスフォーマー さらなる人気者への道, Kyū Toransufōmā Saranaru Ninkimono e no Michi) premiered in Japan on July 6, 2015. The ending themes of the second season are "Destiny ~ 400 Man-nen Mae Kara Itoshi teru" (~DESTINY～400万年前から愛してる～) by Yoshimasa Hosoya and "SHOCK ~ Kono Omoi wa Hikari no Yōni ~" (SHOCK～この想いは光のように～) by Kaito Ishikawa.

Voice actors and characters
Main characters

- Yoshimasa Hosoya as Optimus Prime / GTR Optimus Prime / Convoy
- Ryohei Kimura as Bumblebee / Bumble
- Tatsuhisa Suzuki as Lockdown

Supporting characters

- Yuichi Nakamura as Sunstreaker and Sideswipe, Rumble
- Go Inoue as Prowl
- Kenshō Ono as Hot Rod (Rodimus Convoy)
- Jun Fukushima as Wheeljack
- Kōji Yusa as Jazz (Meister)
- Kousuke Toriumi as Red Alert
- Kōki Uchiyama as Smokescreen
- Fukujuro Katayama as Bluestreak
- Sōichirō Hoshi as Tracks and Sanada Yukimura (from Sengoku BASARA 4)
- Akira Ishida as Ultra Magnus
- Keiji Fujiwara as Megatron
- Tomokazu Sugita as Starscream
- Kaito Ishikawa as Shockwave
- Nobuhiko Okamoto as Soundwave
- Tomoaki Maeno as Drift
- Tesshō Genda as Kazumi Araiwa (from Cooking Papa)
- Sumire Uesaka as Arcee
- Shouta Aoi as Cliff
- Kentarō Itō as Skywarp
- Kenjiro Tsuda as Thundercracker

=== Smartphone app ===
The studio DLE also produced a smartphone app, titled Q Transformers: Mystery of Convoy Returns (キュートランスフォーマー 帰ってきたコンボイの謎, Kyū Toransufōmā Kaettekita Konboi no Nazo), which was released for iOS and Android devices in August 2014. This was a remake of the original game using Q Transformers Optimus Prime and Bumblebee as playable characters instead of Ultra Magnus and Rodimus Prime. Like the original, it is quite difficult but serves as an endless runner game instead of the platformer style of the original. This was a Japanese app store exclusive, but the servers have been shut down since its release.

== Reception ==
Transformers: Mystery of Convoy is known for its high difficulty level and poor stage design, resulting in a largely negative reception both at release and retrospectively. 1UP.com called it the "perfect example of a shameless tie-in." They criticized the game for its high level of difficulty, the game's implementation of the transforming ability and how the ninth stage loops infinitely unless a specific pattern is followed.
