= Bogey Dead 6 =

1996 flight simulation video game

- NTSC front cover
- Developers: Pegasus Japan; Bit Town
- Publishers: JP: Asmik Ace Entertainment; WW: Sony Computer Entertainment
- Platform: PlayStation
- Release: JP: January 26, 1996; NA: August 6, 1996; EU: September, 1996
- Genres: Action, simulation
- Modes: Single player, multiplayer

Bogey Dead 6 (released in Japan as Sidewinder and in Europe as Raging Skies) is a 1996 flight simulation video game developed by Pegasus Japan and Bit Town, and published by Asmik Ace Entertainment in Japan and Sony Computer Entertainment in other regions. The game features six real fighter planes: the F-4E, F-14D, F-15E, F-16C, F/A-18E and the F-22 Raptor. The game is played from the perspective of an ace pilot for the United States Air Force. The objective is to protect the United States from communist invasion, enemy involvement and terrorism. The game is very similar to the Ace Combat series.

"Bogey Dead 6" is jet pilot jargon meaning "unidentified jet directly behind you."

== Gameplay ==
The player takes the role of an air pilot who is part of an elite first strike air unit. This unit is tasked with putting a stop to an international crime organization that is building up a military sized force.

Players can choose to play in a training mode, play a mission mode, or have a VS. battle. Training mode features 3 different missions with players attempting to get as high of a score as possible. VS. battle has 2 players linking up to play a head-to-head battle against each other.

In the mission mode, players can choose from 6 different fighter jets which are the F-4E Phantom II, F-14D Tomcat, F/A-18 Hornet, F-15E Eagle, F-16C Falcon and the F-22 Raptor, each with their own ratings in max speed, endurance, maneuverability, and stability. The game features 12 missions to play through, with objectives such as defending a weapons factory or shooting down a stolen F-16. Each mission completed successfully will reward the player a certain number of credits depending on the difficulty of that mission.

Gameplay involves flying a fighter with a cockpit view. The HUD includes a radar showing the enemy fighters locations plus the number of enemies left. There is also a rear view mirror which lets the player see if there are any enemy fighters on their tail. Players can fire their air-to-air, air-to-surface, and air-to-ground missiles at enemy units.

Options let the player adjust the difficulty level and change the controls between easy or hard.

== Reception ==
Reception

Review scores
Publication	Score
Electronic Gaming Monthly	6.675/10
Next Generation	3/5

The four reviewers of Electronic Gaming Monthly all remarked that Bogey Dead 6 is much more of an arcade-style action shooter than a true flight sim, but otherwise were divided about the game. Shawn Smith said he normally disliked flight sims but was quickly addicted to Bogey Dead 6 due to its well-conceived modes, voice overs, replay value, and variety of missions, but the other three opined that the game, while having strong graphics, sound effects, and entertainment value, ultimately would only appeal to hardcore flight combat fans. Crispin Boyer felt the time limits were the fatal flaw, while Dan Hsu and Sushi-X cited the lack of originality. Next Generation praised the variety of missions, the graphics, and the difficulty level, but felt the game to be ultimately underwhelming due to control issues, such as that the plane can only dip its nose when the wings are almost level.
