= Asmik Ace =

Japanese film production and distribution company

Asmik Ace, Inc.
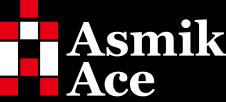

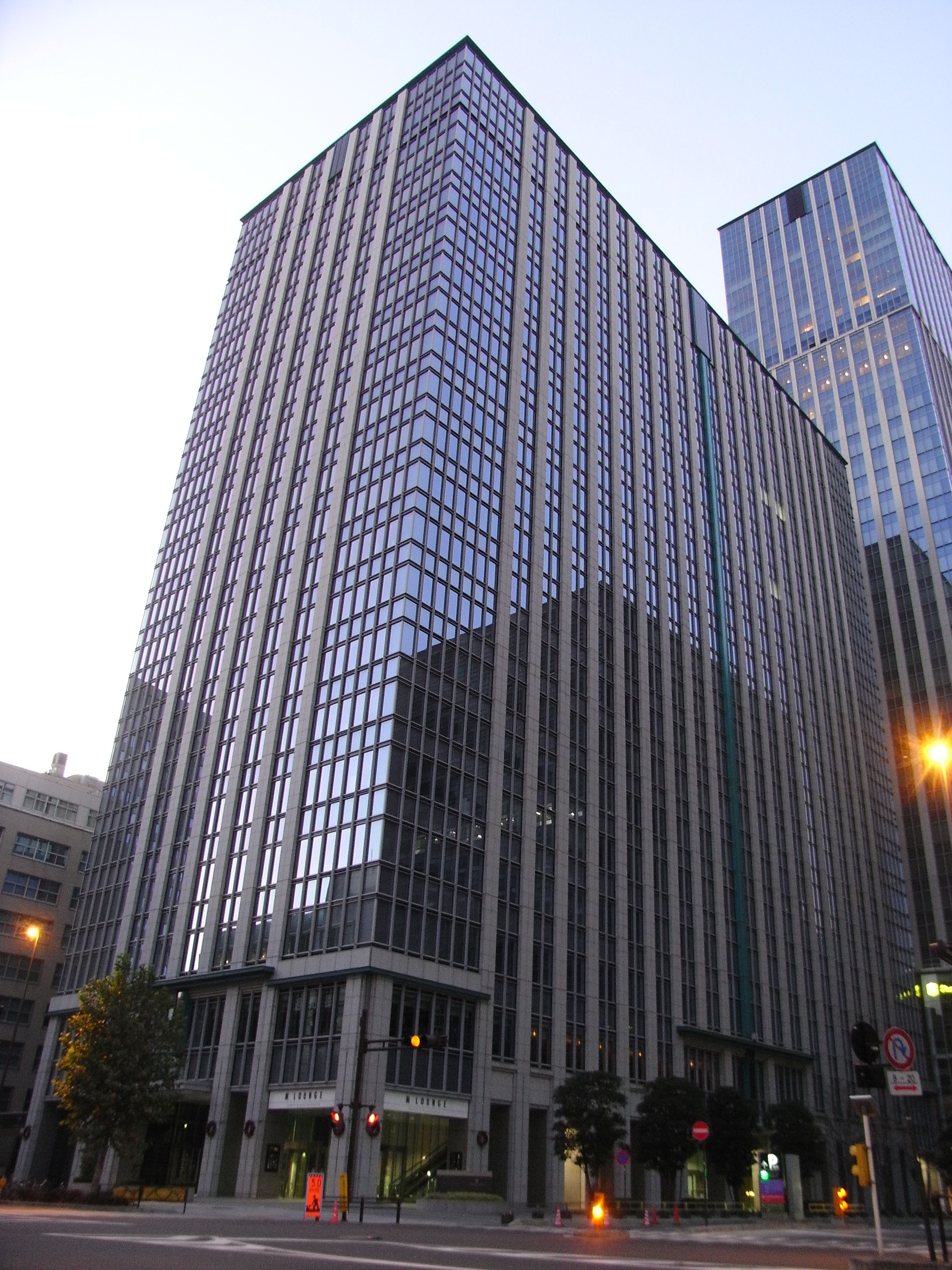
- Headquarters in Chiyoda, Tokyo
- Native name: アスミック・エース株式会社
- Romanized name: Asumikku ēsu kabushikigaisha
- Formerly: Asmik Corporation (1985-1998); Asmik Ace Entertainment, Inc. (1998-2012)
- Type: Subsidiary
- Industry: Film industry Video games
- Predecessor: Ace Pictures
- Founded: 1985; 41 years ago
- Headquarters: Marunouchi, Chiyoda, Tokyo, Japan
- Products: Virtual Pro Wrestling series LSD
- Parent: J:COM
- Website: www.asmik-ace.co.jp/corporate/

Asmik Ace, Inc. (Japanese: アスミック・エース株式会社, Hepburn: Asumikku ēsu kabushikigaisha), formerly Asmik Ace Entertainment Inc. (アスミック・エース エンタテインメント株式会社, Asumikku ēsu entateinmento Kabushiki gaisha) and often known as simply Asmik, is a Japanese film production and distribution company. In the past, the company has distributed video games. It was formed in 1997 through a merger between the Asmik Corporation and Ace Entertainment, both in Japan. The name Asmik comes from its three founding companies: ASK (formerly ASK Kodansha), Sumitomo and Kodansha. The company is headquartered on the third floor of the Lapiross Roppongi building in Minato, Tokyo, and is a wholly owned division of J:COM.

Asmik Corporation was founded in 1985 as a subsidiary of the Sumitomo Corporation of Japan. Its focus was in the area of video games for the video game console market, specifically the NES. It quickly moved on to distribute motion pictures in Japan, and won several awards for doing so. It once had a North American subsidiary, Asmik Corporation of America.

Ace Pictures Inc. was founded in 1981 as a division of Nippon Herald Films to produce Japanese films and distribute foreign art films. Several of its pictures earned awards and hold positions as some of the highest-grossing films in Japan.

Asmik Ace Entertainment has produced games for the Dreamcast, PlayStation, PlayStation 2, PC Engine, Mega Drive/Genesis, Super NES, Nintendo 64, and GameCube, and distributes high quality films for the Japanese movie market.

Asmik Ace Entertainment also distributed a number of DreamWorks Pictures, DreamWorks Animation and EuropaCorp films to Japanese cinemas.

== Video games ==
Asmik had a mascot named Boomer (Asmik-kun in Japanese), a pink dinosaur, which was featured in several video games.

- Air Diver (Sega Genesis)
- Altered Beast (Famicom)
- Asmik-kun Land (Famicom)
- Asmik-kun World 2 (Game Boy)
- Astro Troop Vanark (Western title: Vanark) (PlayStation)
- Battle Zeque Den (Super Famicom)
- Bogey Dead 6 (PlayStation)
- Boomer's Adventure in ASMIK World (Asmik-Kun World) (Game Boy)
- Catrap (Power Paws in Europe; Pitman in Japan) (Game Boy)
- Civilization (Super Famicom, PlayStation, Saturn)
- Conquest of the Crystal Palace (NES)
- Cosmic Epsilon (Famicom)
- Cutie Suzuki no Ringside Angel (Sega Mega Drive)
- Deep Dungeon IV (Famicom)
- D-Force (known in Japan as Dimension Force) (Super NES)
- Dokapon DX (GameCube & PlayStation 2)
- F-15 Super Strike Eagle (Super Famicom)
- Gambler Jiko Chuushinha (Super Famicom)
- Gambler Jiko Chuushinha 2 (Super Famicom)
- Hunter Lime Special Collection Vol 2 (PlayStation)
- Jumpin' Kid: Jack to Mame no Ki Monogatari (Japan only – planned US release as Jack and the Beanstalk) (Famicom)
- Jūōki (port of arcade game known outside Japan as Altered Beast) (Famicom)
- Koutetsu no Kishi (Super Famicom)
- Koutetsu no Kishi 2: Sabaku no Rommel Shougun (Super Famicom)
- Koutetsu no Kishi 3: Gekitotsu Europe Sensen (Super Famicom)
- Lennus II (Super Famicom)
- LSD: Dream Emulator (PlayStation)
- Lupin III: Umi ni Kieta Hihou (GameCube)
- Meimon! Tako Nishiōendan
- Mysterium
- Nemuru Mayu: Sleeping Cocoon (PlayStation)
- Nippon Ichi no Nakantoku
- Oh No! (PlayStation)
- Paladin's Quest (Super NES)
- Power Drift (PC Engine)
- Rhythm N Face (PlayStation)
- Shinobi (PC Engine)
- Sidewinder (PlayStation)
- Sidewinder 2 (PlayStation)
- Sidewinder F (Western title: Lethal Skies: Elite Pilot: Team SW) (PlayStation 2)
- Sidewinder Max (Japan only - Planned western release as Iron Eagle Max) (PlayStation 2)
- Sidewinder V (Western title: Lethal Skies II) (PlayStation 2)
- Super Air Diver (Super NES)
- Super Air Diver 2 (Super NES)
- Super Boy Allan (Famicom Disk System) (published by Sunsoft)
- Super Hydlide (Sega Genesis)
- The Ring: Terror's Realm (Dreamcast)
- Tokyo Wakusei Planetokio (PlayStation)
- Verytex (Sega Mega Drive)
- Virtual Pro Wrestling 64 (Nintendo 64)
- Virtual Pro Wrestling 2 (Nintendo 64)
- WCW vs. the World (PlayStation)
- Xardion (Super Famicom)
