= Super Air Diver =

1993 video game

Super Air Diver Lock On
- North American cover art
- Developer: Copya System
- Publishers: JP: Asmik Ace; NA: Vic Tokai; EU: Sunsoft
- Composer: Akihiko Mori (Don)
- Platform: Super NES
- Release: JP: July 16, 1993; NA: October 1993; EU: November 1993
- Genre: Combat flight simulation
- Mode: Single-player

Super Air Diver (スーパーエアダイバー), also known as Lock On in North America, is a 1993 combat flight simulation video game for the Super Nintendo Entertainment System. It is the follow-up to the Sega Genesis-exclusive Air Diver.

== Summary ==
After a vicious warlord threatens the nations of the world with a massive military invasion, the United Nations have recruited an experienced pilot by the name of Jake Steel in order to bring peace back to the world.

The player participates in a variety of missions against both air and ground forces and can fly in four different aircraft (the British made Panavia Tornado ADV, the Japanese Mitsubishi F-2 fighter, the A-10 Thunderbolt II and the F-14 Tomcat). The player can use the strengths of each airplane to their advantage along with their powerful weaponry such as M61 Vulcans cannons and heat seeking missiles against enemy jet fighters, tanks and other various enemies scattered throughout each mission.

This game supports Mode 7.

A sequel Super Air Diver 2 was released exclusively in Japan for the Super Famicom.

== Reception ==
Reception

Review scores
| Publication | Score |
|---|---|
| Consoles + | 84% |
| Computer and Video Games | 43/100 |
| Famitsu | 26/40 |
| Game Players | 7/10 |
| GameZone | 66/100 |
| Mega Fun | 64% |
| Nintendo Power | 2.975/5 (Note: Nintendo Power scored Super Air Diver 2.9/5 twice for play control and challenge, 3.1/5 for graphics/sound, and 3/5 for theme/fun.) |
| Super Play | 51% |
| Total! | 62% |
| Video Games (DE) | 60% |
| SNES Force | 83/100 |
| Super Action | 80% |
| Super Pro | 82/100 |

== Sequel ==
Super Air Diver 2 (スーパーエアダイバー２) is the Japan-exclusive sequel to the Super Famicom video game Super Air Diver.

The general idea of the game is that the player is launched into a 3D war zone with the task of flying a fighter jet. The player must defeat enemies with various weapons like missiles and gunfire as quickly as possible while obtaining as little damage as possible. Altitude is judged in feet while speed is judged in the plane's Mach number. The player is given the choice between two Western-made aircraft: a F-15E Strike Eagle or a Mirage 2000.

The game was also planned to be released in North America as Lock On 2, but was cancelled for unknown reasons.

Famitsu gave it 22/40.

== See also ==
- Asmik Ace
