= Heiankyo Alien =

1979 video game

- Arcade flyer
- Developers: Theoretical Science Group; Mindware (3671)
- Publishers: JP: Denki Onkyō; NA: Sega-Gremlin; WW: exA-Arcadia; (Arcade 3671)
- Designer: Itaru Kawakami
- Programmer: Mitsutoshi Tabata
- Platforms: Arcade, exA-Arcadia, PC-8000 series, Apple II, Game Boy, Super Famicom, Windows
- Release: PC-8000 series: JP: 1979; Arcade: JP: November 1979; NA: September 1980
- Genre: Maze
- Modes: Single-player, multiplayer
- Arcade system: Dual (clone), exA-Arcadia (3671)

Heiankyo Alien (平安京エイリアン, Heian-kyō Eirian), known as Digger in North America, is a maze video game created by University of Tokyo's Theoretical Science Group (TSG) in 1979. The game was originally developed and released as a personal computer game in 1979, and was then published by Denki Onkyō Corporation as an arcade game in November 1979. In 1980, the arcade game was released in North America as Digger by Sega-Gremlin, with minor changes in appearance.

The game was a commercial success in Japan, where it was among the top ten highest-grossing arcade games of 1979 and 1980. The game has been ported to several other gaming systems since its original release. It was an early example of a maze chase game, predating Namco's Pac-Man (1980). It also began a genre of games about digging holes and luring enemies into traps, variously called "trap 'em up" or "digging" games, which includes titles such as Space Panic (1980) and Lode Runner (1983).

== Gameplay ==
The player at bottom-right is digging a hole to trap incoming enemies (arcade).

The player controls a Heian period police officer (kebiishi (検非違使)) who must defend the capital city (Heian-kyō (平安京)) from an alien invasion by digging holes in the ground and filling them back up after an alien falls inside. The player scores points for every alien trapped, and the quicker the hole is filled up after the alien falls in, the higher the number of points are scored.

The game has nine levels. The aliens increase in number as the levels progress, and they can escape from holes after a certain period of time elapses or if another alien passes above their hole. The player loses if he comes in contact with an alien. There is a time limit for each level, and the number of aliens increases drastically when this limit is reached, essentially preventing the player from completing the level.

After the player completes all nine levels, the game restarts to the first level and repeats again. The player can enter his name on the arcade machine if a high score is reached. In the original version of the game, a unique cursor is employed where the player selects a letter by having his character walk through the street that displays the desired letter. The game also contains a two-player mode, where the players can either alternate turns or play on the same screen simultaneously.

The arcade version uses a Zilog Z80 microprocessor, and the arcade system board used is a copied version of the one used by Sega's Head On. Since the original system board itself was a copy, Heian-kyō Alien's system board was easily duplicated, and many of the units distributed to arcade centers were "copies of a copy" created by other companies. Few of the original units manufactured by Denki Onkyō remain in place today.

== Development ==
Heiankyo Alien was created by the Theoretical Science Group, a small group of students at The University of Tokyo in Tokyo, Japan — established in 1959, they focused primarily on computer science and soldering, among other similar activities. After the Japanese video game market began to "cool off" from the success of Taito's Space Invaders, a column in Weekly Asahi magazine named "Dekigotorogy" appeared, which ran a feature named "In Search of the next Space Invaders" based around the company visiting several different computer clubs across the country in search of potential games to topple the success of Space Invaders. After visiting the Toudai PC Club in The University of Tokyo and finding their game to be uninspiring, they soon visited the Theoretical Science Group only to have the same reaction. Over the course of two days, the group held meetings on the first floor of the student union building to brainstorm potential game ideas.

The idea of the game was conceived by Itaru Kawakami, beginning as a game themed around the player laying down traps in a house to catch cockroaches — feeling that the idea gave the player too much free movement, it was revised to make the playfield resemble a Go board. The cockroaches were changed to aliens due to the film Alien premiering around the same time. The Go-like board was slightly tweaked to resemble a cityscape; after multiple real-world areas were suggested, such as Kyoto, Japan and San Francisco, California, the team ultimately decided to base it on the capital city of Heian-kyō, with the player being changed to a Heian period police officer. The idea was submitted to Weekly Asahi, who published it in their column shortly after. Not wanting their idea to go to waste, the group began programming the game on an Apple II computer, but it suffered from bad optimization and long load times. It was then reworked using the computer's low-resolution mode, which replaced all of the in-game graphics with colored blocks.

After the idea for the game was published in Weekly Asahi, Japanese game studio Denki Onkyō expressed interest in it and had the group meet with them at their headquarters in Ōta, Tokyo. Being presented with the corrected Apple II version, Denki Onkyō approved of the game and hired the group to work for them and make it a full game — prior to this, the Theoretical Science Group briefly visited Namco and Sega, who also expressed interest in the game. Development lasted for roughly three months. Programmers coded the game on a Z80 assembler, where another would take the code, burn it to a ROM board and test the program to make sure it worked. A candy power-up item that caused all aliens to stop moving for a brief moment of time, a homage to the Kuchisake-onna monster from Japanese folklore, was considered but later scrapped as it complicated the game's controls. A time limit was later added to prevent the game from going on forever, while the map was slightly modified to keep the game from becoming too boring. The player's death animation, depicting an angel floating up off the screen, was made as a last-minute addition by request from Denki Onkyō. The game was originally subtitled Otoshiana Game, meaning "Pitfall Trap Game", which was cut later on.

Heiankyo Alien was presented at the 1979 Amusement Machine Show held in the Harumi area of Chūō, Tokyo. The team discovered a bug during its presentation that caused a chunk of the maze to disappear if too many coins were inserted, which allowed enemies to escape the maze and scramble the game's data. Programmer Mitsutoshi Tabata recalls players attempting to memorize the patterns of the enemies. The game was released for arcades in Japan in November 1979, while a PC release was produced the same year.

== Ports ==
Meldac released a Game Boy version of the game in Japan and North America in 1990. This port includes a remake version where a new type of alien appears to chase after the player's character. The game was also ported to the Super Famicom by Nichibutsu in 1995 as Nichibutsu Arcade Classics 2: Heiankyo Alien. The company had previously released a licensed remake titled Kid no Hore Hore Daisakusen. 2017 saw two further ports of the game: NEO Heiankyo Alien by Columbus Circle for Famicom and an official remaster Heiankyo Alien 3671 was released by Mindware on Steam.

=== 3671 Arcade ===
In 2021, Mindware and exA-Arcadia released an enhanced arcade version of Heiankyo Alien 3671 titled Cosmic Digger 3671 in territories outside of Japan. This version is playable with up 4 players simultaneously and compatible with both 4:3 and 16:9 monitors which completely changes the playfield in all generated stages. The controls have been modified to move more precisely than the original and new items have been added to each stage. An additional soundtrack called the Ibojima mix is selectable while holding button 1 on the title screen.

== Reception ==
Heiankyo Alien was widely successful when it was first released, being praised for its originality and element of strategy. The Japanese manga Game Center Arashi, which featured a story based on Heiankyo Alien, is believed to have attributed to the game's success due to its usage of terminology and strategies made by other players — author Misuru Sugaya has stated that Heiankyo Alien remains his favorite game, and claims to play it regularly on his computer.

In Japan, Heiankyo Alien was among the top ten highest-grossing arcade games of 1979. The following year, it was the seventh highest-grossing arcade game of 1980.

The Game Boy release was more negatively received. In a 1998 retrospective review, Allgame criticized it for lacking replay value and "boring" concept.

== Legacy ==
Many copied arcade versions of the game exist with differences in background color and sound effects. Taito produced a version with a light-blue background that recycled many sound effects from Head On. The unit's cabinet and instruction card were created specifically for the version by Taito, but it is not known whether the version was a licensed manufacture or a copy. Hōei Sangyō (now Banpresto) produced an arranged version called Time Alien where alien movements are much quicker, but the game lags whenever the player tries to dig or fill up a hole.

=== Impact ===
Heiankyo Alien was an early example of a maze chase game, predating Namco's Pac-Man (1980). Heiankyo Alien also began a genre about digging holes and luring enemies into traps, variously called "trap 'em up" or "digging" games. It includes Space Panic (1980) and its clones (e.g. Apple Panic), which also feature trappable aliens, as well as Lode Runner (1983), where enemies are human guards. Doraemon Meikyū Daisakusen (1989) and Boomer's Adventure in ASMIK World (1989) are later examples. The VIC-20/MAX Machine cartridge game Super Alien is a direct clone of Heiankyo Alien.
