= 2 Ceti =

Star in the constellation Cetus

- Location of 2 Ceti (circled in red)

Observation data Epoch J2000 Equinox ICRS
- Constellation: Cetus
- Right ascension: 00^{h} 03^{m} 44.38784^{s}
- Declination: −17° 20′ 09.5719″
- Apparent magnitude (V): 4.483

Characteristics
- Evolutionary stage: main sequence
- Spectral type: B9 IVn
- U−B color index: −0.12
- B−V color index: −0.047±0.003

Astrometry
Radial velocity (R_{v})	+8.0±4.6 km/s
Proper motion (μ)	RA: +25.17 mas/yr Dec.: −9.16 mas/yr
Parallax (π)	11.98±0.26 mas
Distance	272 ± 6 ly (83 ± 2 pc)
Absolute magnitude (M_{V})	−0.06

Details
Mass	2.58 M_{☉}
Radius	3.92 R_{☉}
Luminosity	119+6 −5 L_{☉}
Surface gravity (log g)	3.66 cgs
Temperature	11,419±388 K
Metallicity [Fe/H]	+0.00±0.24 dex
Rotational velocity (v sin i)	116 or 237 km/s
Age	217 Myr

Other designations
- Hydor, 2 Cet, BD−18°6417, FK5 905, HD 225132, HIP 301, HR 9098, SAO 147059

Database references
SIMBAD	data

2 Ceti, also named Hydor, is a single star in the equatorial constellation of Cetus, near the border with Aquarius. It is visible to the naked eye with an apparent visual magnitude of 4.483. The distance to 2 Ceti can be estimated from its annual parallax shift of 12.0 mas, which yields a value of around 272 light years. It appears to be moving further from the Earth with a heliocentric radial velocity of about +8 km/s.

The stellar classification for this star is B9 IVn, matching a B-type subgiant star with "nebulous" absorption lines due to rapid rotation. Estimates of the rotation rate range from 116 to 237 km/s, and this high rate of spin is giving the star an equatorial bulge that is 12% larger than the polar radius. 2 Ceti is about 217 million years old with 2.6 times the mass of the Sun and 3.9 times the Sun's radius. It is radiating 119 times the Sun's luminosity from its photosphere at an effective temperature of 11,419 K. An infrared excess has been detected around this star by the Akari satellite at a wavelength of 18μm, suggesting there is an orbiting debris disk.

== Naming ==
The ancient Greek term Hydor (ὕδωρ), meaning water, originally referred to a constellation of faint stars in the region of Aquarius and Cetus. The IAU Working Group on Star Names approved the name Hydor for 2 Ceti, on 25 August 2025 and it is now so entered in the IAU Catalog of Star Names; it had previously been used for λ Aquarii, for which the IAU adopted the Indian name Shatabhisha.
