= Midnight Resistance =

1989 video game

- North American arcade flyer
- Developers: Data East (Arcade, Genesis); Special FX (home computers); ISCO & Opera House (Genesis)
- Publisher: Data East: NA: Sega (Genesis); Ocean (home computers)
- Designer: Koji Akibayashi
- Programmers: Yuichi Nishimura; Naoya Hanada; Yuji Ōtomo; Tac H.
- Artists: Tomo Adachi; Kazumi Minagawa; Fujimi Ōnishi; Yoshinari Kaiho
- Composers: Azusa Hara; Hiroaki Yoshida; Tatsuya Kiuchi; Hitomi Komatsu; Fuse (Arcade); Keith Tinman (home computers); Shogo Sakai (Genesis); Hitoshi Sakimoto (Genesis)
- Platforms: Arcade, Genesis, ZX Spectrum, Amstrad CPC, Commodore 64, Amiga, Atari ST
- Release: Arcade; 1989; Genesis: JP: April 29, 1991; NA: June 1991
- Genre: Run and gun
- Modes: Single-player, multiplayer

Midnight Resistance (Note: Japanese: ミッドナイトレジスタンス, Hepburn: Middonaito Rejisutansu) is a 1989 run and gun video game developed and published by Data East for arcades. It was ported to the Sega Genesis in 1991 as Data East's first video game for the console. The game was also adapted by Ocean Software to home computers.

== Plot ==
In the arcade version, two nameless brothers are on a mission to rescue their family from an entity known as King Crimson.

In the Sega Genesis/Mega Drive version, the main character is Johnny Ford who is a member of an operative group who shuts down drug cartels in South America. After completing his last mission, Johnny returned home only to find it in shambles, and he sees a note in which King Crimson kidnapped his entire family. The reason for the abduction is that Johnny's father, Malcolm Ford, was developing a serum which could help people break their addictions to all narcotics. Since the government is unable to help Johnny, he sets off on his own to rescue his family and destroy King Crimson's empire of evil for good.

== Gameplay ==
Midnight Resistance uses play mechanics and controls similar to that of the Contra series, and can be played by up to two players simultaneously (except Sega Mega Drive/Genesis). The main distinguishing feature is the inclusion of a rotatable joystick similar to the one used in Ikari Warriors, in addition to the traditional set of shoot and jump buttons, allowing the player to adjust his character's aim in one of eight directions by rotating the joystick clockwise or counter-clockwise. This allows the player to keep their aim in one direction while moving in another, even while crawling or jumping.

The power-up system is similar to the one featured in Heavy Barrel (a previous Data East game), in which the player can collect keys after defeating certain enemy soldiers (each player can possess up to six keys at a time). At the end of each stage the player will enter a weapon storage room in which various new weapons and other power-ups can be released from their lockers depending on the number of keys in the player's possession. When the player loses a life, he will drop all the weapons and keys he has in his possession and they can only be recovered if they do not fall off-screen.

The two types of weapons that can be purchased in the weapon stores are special guns that will replace the player's default rifle (or whatever other special weapon he may be currently wielding) and backpack weapons that are launched by pushing the joystick up while pressing the shoot button. Both types of weapons have limited ammunition and when the player's special gun runs out of ammo, he will revert to the default rifle. Additional ammo for the player's current weapon can be purchased in stores as well when available. Other power-ups includes a "supercharge" upgrade that improves the firepower of the player's current weapon (this upgrade is lost when the player loses a life), a barrier that provides temporary invincibility, and extra lives.

There are a total of nine stages, each with its set of unique obstacles and adversaries that the player must overcome. Before the final stages, the keys he has collected during the penultimate stage can be used to free the player's relatives before the final battle with Crimson King. The ending varies depending on how many family members the player has rescued.

== Ports ==
The Mega Drive port in Japan was published by Data East on April 29, 1991. Its Genesis counterpart in North America was published by Sega the same year. The Mega Drive/Genesis version was developed by Data East with the companies ISCO and Opera House. On October 27, 2022, it was included on the lineup of games for the Sega Genesis Mini 2.

Ocean Software published in Europe computer ports for the Commodore 64, ZX Spectrum, Amstrad CPC, Amiga, and the Atari ST, all of which were developed by Special FX.

== Reception ==
Reception

Review scores
Publication	Score
AllGame	2/5
Crash	93%
Famitsu	4/10, 6/10, 7/10, 6/10 (Mega Drive)
Sinclair User	90%
Your Sinclair	92%
MegaTech	85%
MicroHobby (ES)	88%

Awards
Publication	Award
Crash	Crash Smash!
Sinclair User	SU Classic
Your Sinclair	Megagame
The Games Machine	Star Player

In Japan, Game Machine listed Midnight Resistance on their December 15, 1989 issue as being the fifth most-successful table arcade unit of the month.

The ZX Spectrum port was awarded a score of 90% in Sinclair User and 93% in CRASH magazine. It was also included in their 100 best Spectrum games ever made, reaching number 10. The Spectrum version was also voted number 11 in the Your Sinclair Readers' Top 100 Games of All Time.
