= Air Diver =

1990 video game

Air Diver: F-119 Stealth Fighter Simulation
- North American cover art
- Developer: Copya System
- Publishers: JP: Asmik; NA: Seismic
- Series: Air Diver
- Platform: Sega Genesis
- Release: JP: March 9, 1990; NA: April 1990
- Genre: Combat flight simulator
- Mode: Single-player

Air Diver: F-119 Stealth Fighter Simulation (エアダイバー) is a combat flight simulator video game released by Asmik in Japan, and by Seismic in North America in 1990 for the Sega Genesis/Mega Drive console. It is notable as being one of the two first third party published titles for the console in North America. A follow-up, Super Air Diver was released exclusively for the Super Nintendo Entertainment System years later.

== Gameplay ==
The player's fighter pursuing an enemy plane

Air Diver is a combat flight simulator similar to After Burner, played in first-person view (from inside the cockpit). The player must pilot the fictional F-119D Stealth Fighter against terrorists operating out of the Middle East, waging a constant battle against U.S. forces and backed by several hostile governments, including the Soviet Union (although the back of the US package says that the terrorists are backed by extraterrestrial beings). Players must use their stealth capabilities to evade detection and free the globe from torment by oppressive anti-American regimes.

Boss fights are similar to those in other arcade combat flight simulator games. The player's score is tabulated similarly to games found in video arcades. Missions can take place either during the day or at night.

== Reception ==
Reception

Review scores
Publication	Score
Beep! MegaDrive	24/40
Computer and Video Games	56%
Electronic Gaming Monthly	7/10, 7/10, 6/10, 7/10
IGN	3.5/10
Mean Machines Sega	69%
Tilt	8/20
Mega	39%
Mega Drive Advanced Gaming	58%
MegaTech	69%
Sega Power	3/5
Sega Pro	83/100 (1991); 77% (1993)

Air Diver received mixed to poor reviews. EGM's reviewers were perhaps the most positive, giving it decent grades of 6 and 7, praising the detailed art but criticizing the repetitive gameplay and choppy scrolling. French magazine Micro News gave it a "garbage" rating, calling it a "pale copy of After Burner". Similarly, German magazine Power Play said it "looks like a dusty propeller plane" when compared to After Burner, and "not a good debut for Asmik", rating it 37%.
