= Boomer's Adventure in ASMIK World =

1989 Game Boy puzzle video Game

- English box art of Boomer's Adventure in ASMIK World
- Developer: Asmik
- Publishers: JP: Asmik Ace Entertainment, Inc; NA: Asmik Corporation of America
- Series: Asmik-kun World
- Platform: Game Boy
- Release: JP: December 27, 1989; NA: April 1990
- Genre: Puzzle
- Mode: Single-player

Boomer's Adventure in ASMIK World, known in Japan as Teke! Teke! Asmik-kun World (てけ! てけ! アスミッくん ワールド, Teke! Teke! Asumikkun Wārudo) is a 1989 puzzle video game developed and published by Asmik for the Game Boy. Asmik of America released its version in 1990 in North America. The game's direct sequel, Asmik-kun World 2, was never released outside Japan.

== Gameplay ==
The game is an example of the "trap-em-up" genre, which also includes games like Heiankyo Alien (1979), Space Panic (1980), and Lode Runner (1983). It stars Boomer (Asmik-kun in the Japanese version), a pink dinosaur, coursing through maze-like levels through a large tower. Boomer traps enemies by digging holes and letting the enemy fall in them. Boomer can also dig out items and keys needed to complete the levels. Passwords are revealed before and after every boss level, every eight levels.

The game boasts 64 levels but actually only features 32 levels, played twice. Once the player reaches the top of the tower and defeats the master villain of the game, one must then descend the tower, playing through the previous 32 levels in reverse, complete with fighting the previous bosses one more time.
