= 27 Piscium =

Star in the constellation Pisces

- Location of 27 Piscium (circled). It forms the apex of a narrow triangle sharing other stars of similar brightness, 30 (YY) and 33 Piscium.

Observation data Epoch J2000 Equinox ICRS
- Constellation: Pisces
- Right ascension: 23^{h} 58^{m} 40.37708^{s}
- Declination: −03° 33′ 21.5379″
- Apparent magnitude (V): 4.88 (4.90 + 8.90)

Characteristics
- Spectral type: G8 III
- B−V color index: 0.930

Astrometry
Radial velocity (R_{v})	−0.20±0.07 km/s
Proper motion (μ)	RA: −57.13 mas/yr Dec.: −72.08 mas/yr
Parallax (π)	13.91±0.28 mas
Distance	234 ± 5 ly (72 ± 1 pc)
Absolute magnitude (M_{V})	0.60

Orbit
Period (P)	695 yr
Semi-major axis (a)	3.67″
Eccentricity (e)	0.766
Inclination (i)	81.0°
Longitude of the node (Ω)	81.1°
Periastron epoch (T)	2550.00
Argument of periastron (ω) (secondary)	109.6°

Details
Mass	2.39±0.12 M_{☉}
Radius	9.73±0.51 R_{☉}
Luminosity	56+11 −9 L_{☉}
Surface gravity (log g)	2.82±0.07 cgs
Temperature	5,014±23 K
Metallicity [Fe/H]	0.03±0.05 dex
Rotational velocity (v sin i)	1.29±0.56 km/s
Age	710±120 Myr

Other designations
- 27 Psc, BD−04° 5996, FK5 900, HD 224533, HIP 118209, HR 9067, SAO 147008, WDS J23587-0333AB

Database references
SIMBAD	data

27 Piscium is a binary star system in the zodiac constellation of Pisces. It is visible to the naked eye with an apparent visual magnitude of 4.88. Based upon an annual parallax shift of 13.91±0.28 mas, it is located about 234 light years away. The system is positioned near the ecliptic and so is subject to occultation by the Moon.

This star was found to be a double by American astronomer S. W. Burnham. By 2002, sufficient position data had been gathered that orbital motion could be demonstrated, and preliminary elements were determined. The system has an orbital period of 695 years and an eccentricity of 0.766. However, the orbital elements do not fully explain the radial velocity variations, which may indicate there is a brown dwarf companion. This candidate object would have a mass of at least 73 M_{J} and is orbiting with a semimajor axis of around 4 AU.

At the age of around 710 million years, the primary, component A, is a first ascent giant star on the red giant branch with a stellar classification of G8 III, which means it is generating energy through hydrogen fusion along a shell surrounding an inert helium core. It has 2.4 times the mass of the Sun and has expanded to 10 times the Sun's radius. The star is radiating about 56 times the Sun's luminosity from its photosphere at an effective temperature of 5,014 K.

In 2012, the magnitude 8.9 companion, component B, was at an angular separation of 0.80 arcseconds along a position angle of 325°.
