= Kappa Capricorni =

Star in the constellation Capricornus

κ Capricorni
- Location of κ Capricorni (circled)

Observation data Epoch J2000.0 Equinox J2000.0 (ICRS)
- Constellation: Capricornus
- Right ascension: 21^{h} 42^{m} 39.508^{s}
- Declination: −18° 51′ 58.76″
- Apparent magnitude (V): +4.73

Characteristics
- Evolutionary stage: red clump
- Spectral type: G8 III
- U−B color index: +0.51
- B−V color index: +0.88

Astrometry
Radial velocity (R_{v})	−2.87±0.18 km/s
Proper motion (μ)	RA: +146.354 mas/yr Dec.: −8.343 mas/yr
Parallax (π)	10.6991±0.1277 mas
Distance	305 ± 4 ly (93 ± 1 pc)
Absolute magnitude (M_{V})	−0.023

Details
Mass	2.43±0.21 M_{☉}
Radius	13.28±0.47 R_{☉}
Luminosity	106.8±5.9 L_{☉}
Surface gravity (log g)	2.59±0.06 cgs
Temperature	5,096±57 K
Metallicity [Fe/H]	−0.39±0.10 dex
Rotational velocity (v sin i)	0.0 km/s
Age	1.19 Gyr

Other designations
- κ Cap, 43 Cap, BD−19°6152, HD 206453, HIP 107188, HR 8288, SAO 164593

Database references
SIMBAD	data

Kappa Capricorni is a solitary star in the constellation Capricornus. Its name is a Bayer designation that is Latinized from κ Capricorni, and abbreviated Kappa Cap or κ Capricorni. This star is visible to the naked eye with an apparent visual magnitude of +4.73. Based upon an annual parallax shift of 11.09 mas as seen from the Earth, the star is located about 305 light-years (93 pc) from the Sun. It is drifting closer with a line of sight velocity of −3 km/s. The star is positioned sufficiently close to the ecliptic that it is occasionally subject to lunar occultation.

This is a yellow-hued, evolved, G-type giant star with a stellar classification of G8 III. There is a 91% probability that it is currently on the horizontal branch, rather than the red giant branch. As such, it is a red clump giant with an estimated 2.43 times the mass of the Sun and has expanded to 13.28 times the radius of the Sun. The star is about 1.2 billion years old and has a projected rotational velocity that is too small to be measured. It radiates 107 times the solar luminosity from its photosphere at an effective temperature of 5,096 K.
