= Sigma Aquarii =

Star in the constellation Aquarius

- Location of σ Aquarii (circled)

Observation data Epoch J2000 Equinox ICRS
- Constellation: Aquarius
- Right ascension: 22^{h} 30^{m} 38.821^{s}
- Declination: −10° 40′ 40.51″
- Apparent magnitude (V): 4.81

Characteristics
- Evolutionary stage: main sequence
- Spectral type: A0 IVs
- U−B color index: −0.14
- B−V color index: −0.08

Astrometry
Radial velocity (R_{v})	+11.7±0.6 km/s
Proper motion (μ)	RA: −4.095 mas/yr Dec.: −38.019 mas/yr
Parallax (π)	15.8247±0.4146 mas
Distance	206 ± 5 ly (63 ± 2 pc)
Absolute magnitude (M_{V})	0.29±0.23

Details
Mass	2.87 M_{☉}
Radius	2.87 R_{☉}
Luminosity	105 L_{☉}
Surface gravity (log g)	4.07 cgs
Temperature	10,115 K
Metallicity [Fe/H]	+0.44 dex
Rotational velocity (v sin i)	21 km/s
Age	30 Myr

Other designations
- σ Aqr, 57 Aquarii, BD–11°5850, FK5 1591, GC 31440, HD 213320, HIP 111123, HR 8573, SAO 165134, PPM 240380

Database references
SIMBAD	data

Sigma Aquarii is a double star in the equatorial constellation of Aquarius, positioned about 1.3° to the south of the ecliptic. Its name is a Bayer designation that is Latinized from σ Aquarii, and abbreviated Sigma Aqr or σ Aqr. Due to its proximity to the ecliptic, this star is subject to occultation by the Moon. It has a white hue and is visible to the naked eye with an apparent visual magnitude of 4.81. Based upon parallax measurements, the distance to this star is approximately 206 light-years (63 pc). It is drifting further away with a radial velocity of +11 km/s.

The stellar classification of Sigma Aquarii is A0 IVs, suggesting that it is a subgiant star. The s qualifier means that its absorption lines are sharp (narrow) in comparison with standard stars, caused by a relatively slow rotation. This star is an estimated 30 million years old and is spinning with a projected rotational velocity of 21 km/s. It has 2.87 times the mass and 2.87 times the radius of the Sun. Sigma Aquarii is radiating 105 times the luminosity of the Sun from its photosphere at an effective temperature of 10,115 K.

Sigma Aquarii has been categorized as a hot Am star, meaning that it is a chemically peculiar, although this is now considered doubtful. The spectrum displays at least double the normal abundances of elements like magnesium, aluminum and silicon, while helium and scandium are under-abundant. Calcium, normally deficient in Am stars, has near-normal abundance.

The Hipparcos catalogue identified Sigma Aquarii as a possible astrometric binary with an orbital period of 654 days.
