= Iota Aquarii =

B-type main sequence star in the constellation Aquarius

- Location of ι Aquarii (circled)

Observation data Epoch J2000 Equinox ICRS
- Constellation: Aquarius
- Right ascension: 22^{h} 06^{m} 26.227^{s}
- Declination: −13° 52′ 10.85″
- Apparent magnitude (V): 4.279

Characteristics
- Evolutionary stage: main sequence
- Spectral type: B8 V
- U−B color index: −0.288
- B−V color index: −0.062
- Variable type: constant

Astrometry
Radial velocity (R_{v})	−10.0 km/s
Proper motion (μ)	RA: +42.210 mas/yr Dec.: −56.566 mas/yr
Parallax (π)	18.62±0.22 mas
Distance	175 ± 2 ly (53.7 ± 0.6 pc)
Absolute magnitude (M_{V})	+0.64

Details

A
Mass	2.9 M_{☉}
Radius	2.1 R_{☉}
Luminosity	74 L_{☉}
Surface gravity (log g)	4.09±0.08 cgs
Temperature	11,700 K
Metallicity [Fe/H]	−0.08±0.12 dex
Rotational velocity (v sin i)	135 km/s
Age	70 Myr

B
Mass	1.2 M_{☉}
Radius	1.1 R_{☉}
Temperature	6,350 K
Metallicity [Fe/H]	−0.5 dex
Rotational velocity (v sin i)	20 km/s

Other designations
- ι Aquarii, ι Aqr, 33 Aquarii, BD−14 6209, FK5 828, GC 30914, HD 209819, HIP 109139, HR 8418, SAO 164861, PPM 239801

Database references
SIMBAD	data

Iota Aquarii is a binary star system in the equatorial constellation of Aquarius. Its identifier is a Bayer designation that is Latinised from ι Aquarii, and abbreviated Iota Aqr or ι Aqr. This star is visible to the naked eye with an apparent magnitude of +4.279. Based upon parallax measurements, the distance to this star is around 175 light-years (54 parsecs). The system is drifting closer to the Sun with a radial velocity of −10 km/s.

Iota Aquarii was first catalogued in Uranometria in 1603; the binary nature of this system was discovered in 2009 following a radial velocity survey using the HARPS instrument. A 2010 infrared search for companions around this star was unsuccessful. The presence of a stellar companion was confirmed through direct spectral detection in 2016. The companion shows a significant velocity variation over a 77-day interval, suggesting a short orbital period. The companion was re-observed in 2024, showing a projected separation of 0.38 astronomical units. Together with the masses of the components, this suggests an orbital period of roughly 40 days.

The spectrum of the primary, component A, fits a stellar classification of B8 V, suggesting that this is a B-type main-sequence star. It is roughly 70 million years old and is spinning rapidly with a projected rotational velocity of 135 km/s. The star has 2.9 times the mass of the Sun and 2.1 times the Sun's radius. It is radiating 74 times the luminosity of the Sun from its photosphere at an effective temperature of 11,700 K. The secondary, component B, has 1.2 times the mass of the Sun, 1.1 times the radius, and an effective temperature of 6,350 K. The system is a source for X-ray emission.

There is evidence for a third companion based on the difference of proper motion measurements by the Hipparcos and Gaia spacecraft. Such a companion would have an orbital period of roughly one year, and be either a faint red dwarf or a white dwarf.
