= 30 Piscium =

Star in the constellation Pisces

- Location of 30 (also called YY) Piscium (circled). It presents in a narrow triangle with two other stars of similar brightness, 27 and 33 Piscium.

Observation data Epoch J2000 Equinox ICRS
- Constellation: Pisces
- Right ascension: 00^{h} 01^{m} 57.61947^{s}
- Declination: −06° 00′ 50.6540″
- Apparent magnitude (V): 4.31 – 4.41

Characteristics
- Spectral type: M3 III
- B−V color index: 1.631±0.011
- Variable type: LPV, LB?

Astrometry
Radial velocity (R_{v})	−11.7±0.5 km/s
Proper motion (μ)	RA: 46.941 mas/yr Dec.: −40.471 mas/yr
Parallax (π)	7.8758±0.4105 mas
Distance	410 ± 20 ly (127 ± 7 pc)
Absolute magnitude (M_{V})	−1.20

Details
Radius	109.2+5.46 −6.05 R_{☉}
Luminosity	1,597±177 L_{☉}
Surface gravity (log g)	2 cgs
Temperature	3,490±35 K

Other designations
- 30 Psc, YY Psc, BD−06° 6345, FK5 1630, HD 224935, HIP 154, HR 9089, SAO 147042

Database references
SIMBAD	data

30 Piscium (HIP 154) is a solitary variable star in the zodiac constellation of Pisces. It is visible to the naked eye with an apparent visual magnitude of 4.37. Its calculated mid-value of antiposed parallax shift as the Earth moves around the Sun of very roughly 7.88 mas, makes it around 410 light years away. Its net movement in the present epoch is one of moving closer – radial velocity (speed away from our star system) is −12 km/s.

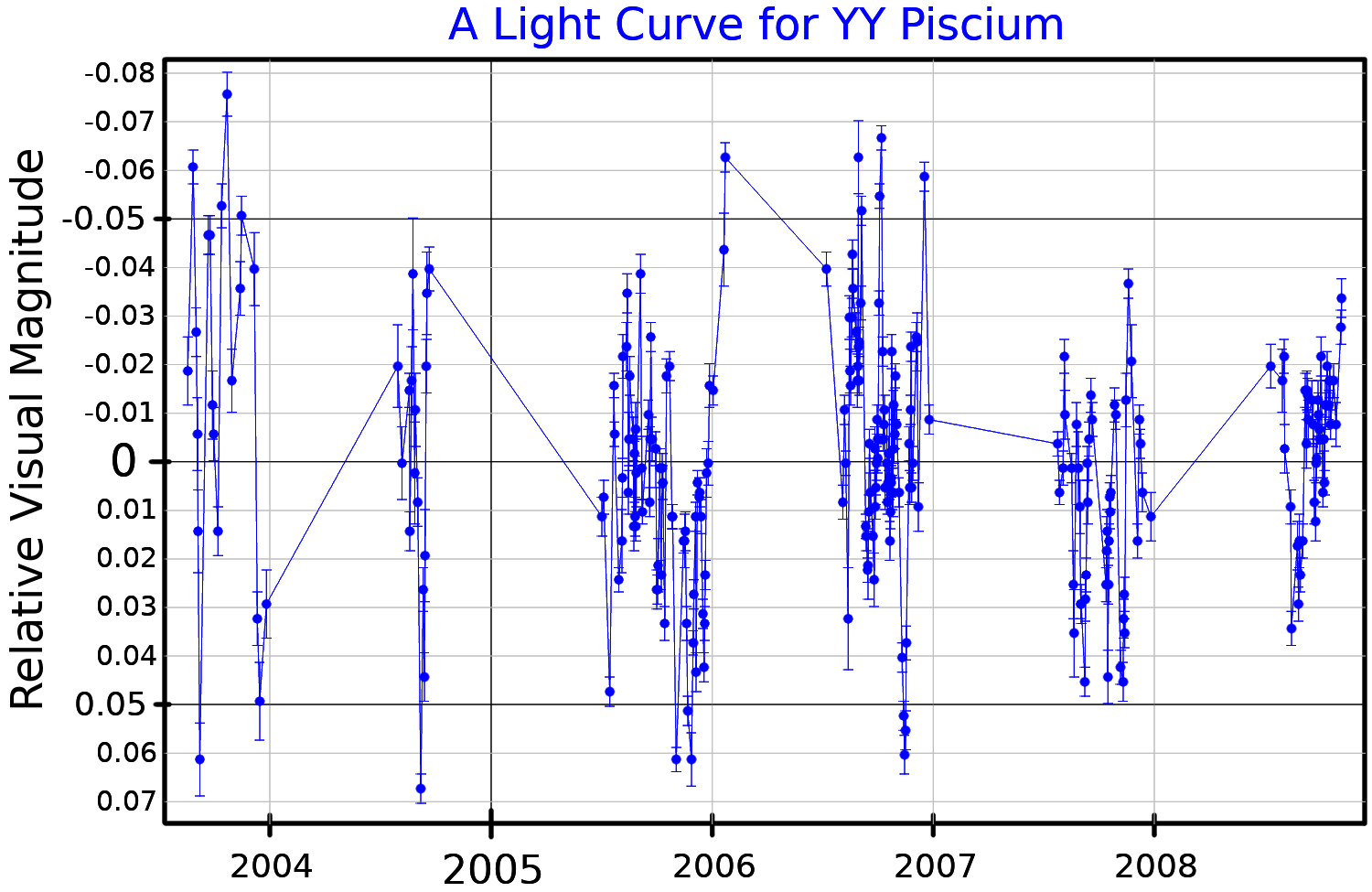
A visual band light curve for YY Piscium, plotted from data published by Tabur et al. (2009)

This is an aging red giant star with a stellar classification of M3 III, indicating it has exhausted the hydrogen at its core and evolved off the main sequence. It is a candidate long-period variable star and has been given the designation YY Psc. It varies in brightness between magnitudes 4.31 and 4.41 with no clear period. Possible periods of 23.1, 32.0, 53.6, and 167.8 days have been identified. The star has 109 times the Sun's radius and is radiating 1,600 times the luminosity of the Sun from its enlarged photosphere at an effective temperature of 3,490 K.
