= Encampment (Chinese constellation) =

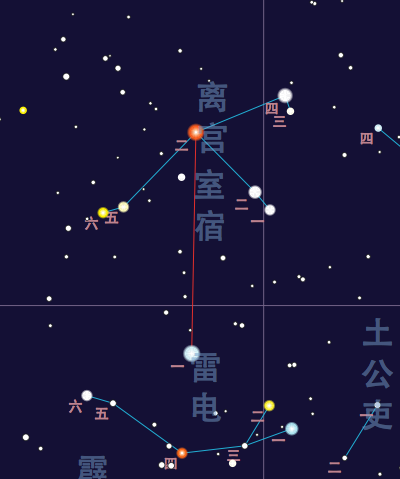
Shì Xiù map

The Encampment mansion (Chinese: 室宿; pinyin: Shì Xiù) is one of the 28 mansions of the Chinese constellations. It is one of the northern mansions of the Black Tortoise.

== Asterisms ==
English name	Chinese name	European constellation	Number of stars	Representing
Encampment	室	Pegasus	2	Operating room, also representing Black Tortoise's body
Resting Palace	離宮	Pegasus	6	An imperial palace
Thunder and Lightning	雷電	Pegasus	6	The God of mine
Line of Ramparts	壘壁陣	Pisces/Aquarius/Capricornus	12	Fortifications around the barracks
Palace Guard	羽林軍	Aquarius/Piscis Austrinus	45	The ancient imperial guards
Axe	鈇鉞	Aquarius	3	The axe for executions of death penalty
North Gate of the Military Camp	北落師門	Piscis Austrinus	1	Barrack's north gate
Net for Catching Birds	八魁	Cetus	6	The trap to capture animals, hunting animals on behalf of the officials responsible for
Materials for Making Tents	天綱	Piscis Austrinus	1	Military book
Official for Materials Supply	土公吏	Pegasus	2	Officials responsible for civil engineering building, or the officials responsible for logistics
Flying Serpent	螣蛇	Andromeda/Lacerta/Cassiopeia/Cepheus/Cygnus	22	Shape of flying snakes
