= Phi Aquarii =

Star in the constellation Aquarius

- Location of φ Aquarii (circled)

Observation data Epoch J2000 Equinox J2000
- Constellation: Aquarius
- Right ascension: 23^{h} 14^{m} 19.358^{s}
- Declination: −06° 02′ 56.42″
- Apparent magnitude (V): +4.223

Characteristics
- Spectral type: M1.5 III
- U−B color index: +1.897
- B−V color index: +1.563

Astrometry
| Radial velocity (R_{v}) | +2.48±0.32 km/s |
| Proper motion (μ) | RA: +36.575 mas/yr Dec.: −195.441 mas/yr |
| Parallax (π) | 14.3482±0.2594 mas |
| Distance | 227 ± 4 ly (70 ± 1 pc) |
| Absolute magnitude (M_{V}) | 0.30±0.120 |

Details

A
| Mass | 1.00±0.03 M_{☉} |
| Radius | 34.77^{+1.83}_{−2.04} R_{☉} |
| Luminosity | 207.7±25.2 L_{☉} |
| Surface gravity (log g) | 1.5 cgs |
| Temperature | 3,715±48 K |
| Rotational velocity (v sin i) | 6.7 km/s |
| Age | 10.97±0.83 Gyr |

Other designations
- φ Aqr, 90 Aquarii, BD−06°6170, FK5 1607, GC 32346, HD 219215, HIP 114724, HR 8834, SAO 146585, PPM 207311

Database references
| SIMBAD | data |

Phi Aquarii is a binary star system in the equatorial constellation of Aquarius. Its name is a Bayer designation that is Latinized from φ Aquarii, and abbreviated Phi Aqr or φ Aqr. This system is visible to the naked eye as a point of light with a combined apparent visual magnitude of +4.223. Parallax measurements indicate its distance from Earth is approximately 227 light-years (70 pc). It is drifting further away with a radial velocity of +2.5 km/s. The system is positioned 1.05 degrees south of the ecliptic so it is subject to lunar occultations.

This is a spectroscopic binary star system with an estimated period of 2,500 days (6.8 yr). The primary component is an aging red giant star with a stellar classification of M1.5 III. At an estimated age of 11 billion years, it has exhausted the supply of hydrogen at its core and evolved away from the main sequence. The star has the same mass as the Sun, but has expanded to 35 times the Sun's girth. It is radiating 208 times the luminosity of the Sun from its enlarged photosphere at an effective temperature of 3,715 K, giving it the reddish hue of an M-type star.

On 6 September 2019, it had a close conjunction (geocentric separation <1') with Neptune.
