= 33 Piscium =

Star in the constellation Pisces

- The narrow triangle in which this comparative star, in apparent magnitude (brightness viewed from Earth), figures. Click to show context

Observation data Epoch J2000 Equinox ICRS
- Constellation: Pisces
- Right ascension: 00^{h} 05^{m} 20.14193^{s}
- Declination: −05° 42′ 27.4279″
- Apparent magnitude (V): 4.61

Characteristics
- Spectral type: K0 IIIb
- Apparent magnitude (U): 6.52
- Apparent magnitude (B): 5.65
- Apparent magnitude (R): 3.83
- Apparent magnitude (I): 3.29
- Apparent magnitude (J): 2.89
- Apparent magnitude (H): 2.31
- Apparent magnitude (K): 2.21
- B−V color index: 1.029±0.037
- Variable type: RS CVn

Astrometry
Radial velocity (R_{v})	−6.56±0.23 km/s
Proper motion (μ)	RA: −6.54 mas/yr Dec.: 87.85 mas/yr
Parallax (π)	25.32±0.53 mas
Distance	129 ± 3 ly (39.5 ± 0.8 pc)
Absolute magnitude (M_{V})	1.63

Orbit
Period (P)	72.93 d
Eccentricity (e)	0.272±0.017
Periastron epoch (T)	2,422,530.330±0.809 JD
Argument of periastron (ω) (secondary)	337.71±4.60°
Semi-amplitude (K_{1}) (primary)	16.43±0.31 km/s

Details
Mass	0.83±0.22 M_{☉}
Radius	7 R_{☉}
Luminosity	24 L_{☉}
Surface gravity (log g)	2.620±0.11 cgs
Temperature	4,736±92 K
Metallicity [Fe/H]	−0.12±0.05 dex
Rotational velocity (v sin i)	0.0 km/s
Age	4.8+3.3 −1.2 Gyr

Other designations
- 33 Psc, BC Psc, BD−06° 6357, FK5 1002, GC 59, HD 28, HIP 443, HR 3, SAO 128572, PPM 181831, GCRV 36, GSC 04669-00996, 2MASS J00052013-0542275

Database references
SIMBAD	data

33 Piscium is a binary star system in the zodiac constellation of Pisces. It is visible to the naked eye with an apparent visual magnitude of 4.61. The distance to this system, as determined from an annual parallax shift of 25.32±0.53 mas, is about 129 light years. It is moving closer to the Sun with a heliocentric radial velocity of −6.6 km/s.

This system was found to have a variable radial velocity by Leah B. Allen and Adelaide Hobe of Lick Observatory in 1911. It was identified as a single-lined spectroscopic binary, and the orbital elements were published by Canadian astronomer W. E. Harper in 1926. The pair have an orbital period of 72.93 days and an eccentricity of 0.27. This is a RS Canum Venaticorum variable, indicating a close binary system with active star spots, and has the variable star designation BC Psc.

The primary, component A, is a first-ascent red giant with a stellar classification of K0 IIIb, having chemical abundances that match a first dredge-up mixing model. Pourbaix & Boffin (2003) estimated the mass of the primary as 1.7±0.4 M_{☉} and the secondary as 0.76±0.11 M_{☉}. However, Feuillet et al. (2016) derived a much lower mass estimate of 0.83±0.22 M_{☉} for the primary. At the age of roughly five billion years, the star has expanded to 7 times the radius of the Sun. It is radiating 24 times the Sun's luminosity from its photosphere at an effective temperature of about 4,736 K.
