= List of returning characters in Kaizoku Sentai Gokaiger =

The 34 past Super Sentai groups forming a triangle to battle the Space Empire Zangyack in the Legend War.

As the 35th anniversary of the Super Sentai franchise, Kaizoku Sentai Gokaiger features several guest appearances from actors who starred or appeared in the previous 34 Super Sentai series reprising their roles.

== Past protagonists ==
During the events of Kaizoku Sentai Gokaiger, the 34 previous Sentai teams participated in the Legend War to prevent Earth from falling to the Zangyack Empire, sacrificing their powers in order to do so. Over the course of the series, the Sentai warriors encounter the Gokaigers, Zangyack, and the privateer Basco Ta Jolokia for varying reasons, such as to get their powers back and/or give their blessing to the Gokaigers. After the Gokaigers defeat Zangyack and Basco, they return their predecessors' powers to their respective owners.

=== Tsuyoshi Kaijo ===
Tsuyoshi Kaijo (海城 剛, Kaijō Tsuyoshi) is a member of EAGLE who became Akarenger (アカレンジャー, Akarenjā) to lead the Gorengers in fighting the Black Cross Army.

Tsuyoshi takes part in the Legend War, leading the first 34 Super Sentai teams against the Zangyack Empire's first invasion fleet before calling for his allies to sacrifice their powers. During the events of the crossover film Gokaiger Goseiger Super Sentai 199 Hero Great Battle, Tsuyoshi gives his blessing and access to his team's Great Power to the Gokaigers to help them defeat the Black Cross Colossus. After the Gokaigers defeat the Zangyack Empire during the series finale, Tsuyoshi receives his powers back and thanks the pirates.

Tsuyoshi Kaijo is portrayed by Naoya Makoto (誠 直也, Makoto Naoya), who reprises his role from Himitsu Sentai Gorenger.

=== Aka Red ===
Aka Red (アカレッド, Aka Reddo) is the physical embodiment of the Super Sentai's red warriors' spirits who is capable of using all of their powers via his Soul Advent (ソウル降臨, Sōru Kōrin) ability.

Following the Legend War, he forms the Red Pirates (赤き海賊団, Akaki Kaizokudan) to search the universe for the Ranger Keys, taking Captain Marvelous and Basco Ta Jolokia under his wing. However, Basco learned of Aka Red's intentions and sold out the Red Pirates to the Zangyack Empire. Aka Red makes Marvelous promise to find the Greatest Treasure in the Universe and entrusts him with the Ranger Keys, Gokai Galleon, and Navi before leading Zangyack forces away from Marvelous, seemingly sacrificing himself in the process. After the Gokaigers defeat the Zangyack Empire, Aka Red appears before Marvelous and thanks him before disappearing once more.

Aka Red is voiced by Tōru Furuya (古谷 徹, Furuya Tōru), who reprises his role from GoGo Sentai Boukenger vs. Super Sentai.

=== Kai Ozu ===
Kai Ozu (小津 魁, Ozu Kai) is the youngest of the Ozu siblings who became Magi Red (マジレッド, Maji Reddo) and led the Magiranger family against the Infershia Empire. After defeating the Infershian emperor, N Ma, Kai became a liaison to the reformed Infershia.

With help from Heavenly Saint Flagel (天空聖者フレイジェル, Tenkū Seija Fureijeru), Kai reveals the true power of the Gokaigers' Ranger Keys to them, helps Don Dogoier find his courage, and gives the Gokaigers his blessing and access to his team's Great Power.

Kai Ozu is portrayed by Atsushi Hashimoto (橋本 淳, Hashimoto Atsushi), who reprises his role from Mahō Sentai Magiranger.

=== Marika Reimon ===
Marika Reimon (礼紋 茉莉花, Reimon Marika), affectionately called "Jasmine" (ジャスミン, Jasumin) by her friends, is an officer of the S.P.D. (Special Police Dekaranger)'s Earth unit who serves as Deka Yellow (デカイエロー, Deka Ierō).

Jasmine arrests Captain Marvelous when he seeks out the police while searching for the Greatest Treasure in the Universe. A fight ensues between them, though Marvelous escapes.

Marika "Jasmine" Reimon is portrayed by Ayumi Kinoshita (木下 あゆ美, Kinoshita Ayumi), who reprises her role from Tokusou Sentai Dekaranger.

=== Doggie Kruger ===
Anubian Chief Doggie Kruger (ドギー・クルーガー, Dogī Kurūgā), affectionately called "Boss" (ボス, Bosu) by his subordinates, is the commander of the S.P.D.'s Earth unit who serves as Deka Master (デカマスター, Deka Masutā).

In the series' first episode and the film Gokaiger Goseiger Super Sentai 199 Hero Great Battle, Kruger takes part in the Legend War, fighting alongside his fellow Sentai supporting warriors before sacrificing his powers to destroy the Zangyack Empire's first invasion fleet. In the present, he encounters Captain Marvelous and reluctantly works with him to stop an Alienizer working with Zangyack. Despite his initial distrust, Kruger eventually chooses to have faith in the pirate's sense of pride in walking his own path before giving the Gokaigers his blessing and access to his team's Great Power. After the pirates defeat the Zangyack Empire in the series finale, Kruger and Signalman receive their powers back and salute the Gokaigers as thanks.

Doggie Kruger is voiced by Tetsu Inada (稲田 徹, Inada Tetsu), who reprises his role from Tokusou Sentai Dekaranger.

=== Banban Akaza ===
Banban Akaza (赤座 伴番, Akaza Banban), affectionately called "Ban" (バン) by his teammates, is an elite officer in S.P.D.'s Fire Squad who originally worked as an officer in S.P.D.'s Earth unit, serving as Deka Red (デカレッド, Deka Reddo) in both cases.

After the Gokaigers earn his team's Great Power, Ban clears them of their piracy charges and playfully threatens repercussions if they misuse his team's powers.

Banban "Ban" Akaza is portrayed by Ryuji Sainei (載寧 龍二, Sainei Ryūji), who reprises his role from Tokusou Sentai Dekaranger.

=== Jan Kandou ===
Jan Kandou (漢堂 ジャン, Kandō Jan) is a master of the Geki Jū Tiger-Ken (激獣タイガー拳, Geki Jū Taigāken) style of Jūken who joined the Gekirangers in fighting the Rin Jūken Akugata and Gen Jūken as Geki Red (ゲキレッド, Geki Reddo).

After encountering them, Jan teaches Don Dogoier and Ahim de Famille the ways of Geki Jūken so they can access the Gekirangers' Great Power and defeat Pachacamac XIII, wholeheartedly seeing the Gokaigers as part of the Super Sentai.

Jan Kandou is portrayed by Hiroki Suzuki (鈴木 裕樹, Suzuki Hiroki), who reprises his role from Juken Sentai Gekiranger.

=== Master Xia Fu ===
Master Xia Fu (マスター・シャーフー, Masutā Shā Fū) is the grand master of the Geki Jū Felis-Ken (激獣フェリス拳, Geki Jū Ferisuken) style of Jūken, the Gekirangers' mentor, and leader of the Seven Kensei.

After the Gokaigers earn the Gekirangers' Great Power, Xia Fu questions Kandou's trust in the pirates, though the latter affirms his decision.

Master Xia Fu is voiced by Ichirō Nagai (永井 一郎, Nagai Ichirō), who reprises his role from Juken Sentai Gekiranger.

=== Kakeru Shishi ===
Kakeru Shishi (獅子 走, Shishi Kakeru) is a veterinarian who was chosen by the Power Animal, Gao Lion, to become Gao Red (ガオレッド, Gao Reddo) and lead the Gaorangers in their fight against the Orgs.

While he initially sees the Gokaigers as selfish and typical of pirates, Kakeru changes his mind after Don Dogoier and Ahim de Famille convince him otherwise and he sees the Gokaigers fighting altruistically.

Kakeru Shishi is portrayed by Noboru Kaneko (金子 昇, Kaneko Noboru), who reprises his role from Hyakujuu Sentai Gaoranger.

=== Kaoru Shiba ===
Kaoru Shiba (志葉 薫, Shiba Kaoru) is a noblewoman and the 18th head of the Shiba House who was secretly trained to be a samurai and seal the Gedoushu as Princess Shinken Red (姫シンケンレッド, Hime Shinken Reddo) while her kagemusha, Takeru Shiba led the Shinkengers in her place.

When the Gokaigers seek out a samurai as part of their quest for the Greatest Treasure in the Universe, Kaoru challenges them to a duel in the hopes of retrieving the Shinkenger Ranger Keys. Joe Gibken accepts her challenge, but a Zangyack attack forces them to postpone their duel. After seeing the Gokaigers' bonds while helping treat Captain Marvelous' injuries, she gives Joe a Secret Disk, her blessing, and access to her team's Great Power. During the events of the film Tokumei Sentai Go-Busters vs. Kaizoku Sentai Gokaiger: The Movie, Kaoru delivers a message to the Go-Busters to help them reunite with their comrades after they had been sent back in time.

Kaoru Shiba is portrayed by Runa Natsui (夏居 瑠奈, Natsui Runa), who reprises her role from Samurai Sentai Shinkenger.

=== Toshizo Tanba ===
Toshizo Tanba (丹波 歳三, Tanba Toshizō) is Kaoru Shiba's arrogant yet fiercely loyal retainer.

He accompanies her in attempting to retrieve the Shinkenger Ranger Keys from the Gokaigers, helping civilians amidst a Zangyack attack, and treating Captain Marvelous' injuries. While on the Gokai Galleon, Tanba suggests stealing the Shinkenger Keys, but Shiba disapproves.

Toshizo Tanba is portrayed by Kazuyuki Matsuzawa (松澤 一之, Matsuzawa Kazuyuki), who reprises his role from Samurai Sentai Shinkenger.

=== Kyosuke Jinnai ===
Kyosuke Jinnai (陣内 恭介, Jinnai Kyōsuke) is a test driver at the Pegasus Auto Garage who used Carmagic Power to become Red Racer (レッドレーサー, Reddo Rēsā) and lead the Carrangers in their fight against the Bowzock gang.

Following the Legend War, Kyosuke decides to teach traffic safety to young kids. After encountering the Gokaigers, he reveals his identity and offers to help them earn his team's Great Power in exchange for their help in a traffic safety acting troupe. Despite getting caught in a love triangle between Zangyack scientist Insarn and one of the empire's Action Commanders, Kyosuke follows through on his promise.

Kyosuke Jinnai is portrayed by Yūji Kishi (岸 祐二, Kishi Yūji), who reprises his role from Gekisou Sentai Carranger.

=== Tensou Sentai Goseiger ===
Tensou Sentai Goseiger (天装戦隊ゴセイジャー, Tensō Sentai Goseijā) are the 34th Super Sentai team and five Gosei Angels (護星天使, Gosei Tenshi) - Alata, Eri, Agri, Moune, and Hyde - and an advanced Headder (ヘッダー, Heddā) called Gosei Knight (ゴセイナイト, Gosei Naito), who follow their kind's mission to protect Earth from all evil, having battled numerous villain groups manipulated by the fallen Gosei Angel Brajira of the Messiah.

During the events of the film Gokaiger Goseiger Super Sentai 199 Hero Great Battle, the Gosei Angels steal back their powers before battling the Gokaigers to restore Gosei Knight, who had been reverted to his Groundion Headder form. After eventually joining forces to defeat the Black Cross King, the Goseigers accept the Gokaigers as a Sentai team and give the pirates their blessing and access to their Great Power.

Alata, Eri, Agri, Moune, and Hyde are portrayed by Yudai Chiba (千葉 雄大, Chiba Yūdai), Rika Sato (さとう 里香, Satō Rika), Kyousuke Hamao (浜尾 京介, Hamao Kyōsuke), Mikiho Niwa (にわ みきほ, Niwa Mikiho), and Kento Ono (小野 健斗, Ono Kento) respectively while Gosei Knight is voiced by Katsuyuki Konishi (小西 克幸, Konishi Katsuyuki), all of whom reprise their roles from Tensou Sentai Goseiger.

=== Sokichi Banba ===
Sokichi Banba (番場 壮吉, Banba Sōkichi) is a flamboyant playboy and ISSIS officer who became Big One (ビッグワン, Biggu Wan) and led the JAKQ team against the terrorist organization CRIME.

During the events of the film Gokaiger Goseiger Super Sentai 199 Hero Great Battle, Sokichi helps Tsuyoshi Kaijo in covering the Goseigers so they can take part in the Legend War before sacrificing their powers to destroy the Zangyack Empire's first invasion fleet. In the present, Sokichi gives the Gokaigers his blessing and access to his team's Great Power.

Sokichi Banba is portrayed by Hiroshi Miyauchi (宮内 洋, Miyauchi Hiroshi), who reprises his role from J.A.K.Q. Dengekitai and also voices Aorenger of Himitsu Sentai Gorenger.

=== Wolzard Fire ===
Heavenly Hero Wolzard Fire (天空勇者ウルザードファイヤー, Tenkū Yūsha Uruzādo Faiyā), aka Isamu Ozu (小津 勇, Ozu Isamu), is the human form of Heavenly Saint Blagel (天空聖者ブレイジェル, Tenkū Seija Bureijeru) and patriarch of the Magiranger family who was cursed by the Infershia Empire's ruler, N Ma, and forced to battle his children as the Dark Magic Knight Wolzard (魔導騎士ウルザード, Madō Kishi Uruzādo) until they helped free him. He would later become Wolzard Fire to help his family defeat N Ma.

During the events of the film Gokaiger Goseiger Super Sentai 199 Hero Great Battle, Isamu leads the Super Sentai teams' supporting warriors during the Legend War before sacrificing his powers to destroy the Zangyack Empire's first invasion fleet.

Wolzard Fire is voiced by Tsutomu Isobe (磯部 勉, Isobe Tsutomu), who reprises his role from Mahō Sentai Magiranger.

=== Signalman ===
Signalman (シグナルマン, Shigunaruman) is a robotic figure from the Police Planet who aided the Carrangers in their fight against the Bowzock gang.

During the events of the film Gokaiger Goseiger Super Sentai 199 Hero Great Battle, Signalman takes part in the Legend War, fighting alongside his fellow Sentai supporting warriors before sacrificing his powers to destroy the Zangyack Empire's first invasion fleet. Due to the temporary loss of his original form, Signalman was regressed to an inanimate form, which Doggie Kruger of S.P.D. safeguarded. After the Gokaigers defeat the Zangyack Empire in the series finale, Signalman reverts to his original form and accompanies Kruger in saluting the Gokaigers as a sign of thanks.

Signalman is voiced by Hōchū Ōtsuka (大塚 芳忠, Ōtsuka Hōchū), who reprises his role from Gekisou Sentai Carranger.

=== Zubaan ===
DaiKenjin Zubaan (大剣人ズバーン, Daikenjin Zubān) is a Lemurian Precious called "The Golden Sword" that can assume a humanoid form and aided the Boukengers in fighting the Negative Syndicates and protecting other Precious.

During the events of the film Gokaiger Goseiger Super Sentai 199 Hero Great Battle, Zubaan takes part in the Legend War, fighting alongside his fellow Sentai supporting warriors before sacrificing his powers to destroy the Zangyack Empire's first invasion fleet.

Zubaan is voiced by Tomokazu Seki (関 智一, Seki Tomokazu), who also serves as the series' narrator and the voice of the Gokaigers' weaponry.

=== Hyuuga ===
Hyuuga (ヒュウガ, Hyūga) is a resident of the Ginga Forest who was originally meant to become Ginga Red before a series of events led to his brother Ryouma becoming Ginga Red instead while Hyuuga eventually became the Black Knight (黒騎士, Kuro Kishi) and joined Ryouma and the Gingamen in fighting the Balban space pirates.

During the events of the film Gokaiger Goseiger Super Sentai 199 Hero Great Battle, Hyuuga takes part in the Legend War, fighting alongside his fellow Sentai supporting warriors before sacrificing his powers to destroy the Zangyack Empire's first invasion fleet. During the series, Hyuuga is attacked by Basco Ta Jolokia for his team's Great Power before being saved by the Gokaigers. While under their protection, Hyuuga tests Gai Ikari's self-worth and entrusts him with the Black Knight Ranger Key and the Gingamen's Great Power after Gai passes.

Hyuuga is portrayed by Teruaki Ogawa (小川 輝晃, Ogawa Teruaki), who reprises his role from Seijuu Sentai Gingaman and also voices Ninja Red of Ninja Sentai Kakuranger.

=== Aorenger ===
Aorenger (アオレンジャー, Aorenjā), aka Akira Shinmei (新命 明, Shinmei Akira), is a member of EAGLE who joined the Gorengers in fighting the Black Cross Army.

During the events of the film Gokaiger Goseiger Super Sentai 199 Hero Great Battle, Aorenger takes part in the Legend War before sacrificing his powers to destroy the Zangyack Empire's first invasion fleet.

Aorenger is voiced by Hiroshi Miyauchi, who reprises his role from Himitsu Sentai Gorenger and also appears as Sokichi Banba of J.A.K.Q. Dengekitai.

=== Ninja Red ===
Ninja Red (ニンジャレッド, Ninja Reddo), aka Sasuke (サスケ), is a descendant of Sarutobi Sasuke who was tricked into freeing the Youkai Army Corps from their imprisonment and joined the Kakurangers to re-seal them.

During the events of the film Gokaiger Goseiger Super Sentai 199 Hero Great Battle, Sasuke takes part in the Legend War before sacrificing his powers to destroy the Zangyack Empire's first invasion fleet.

Ninja Red is voiced by Teruaki Ogawa, who reprises his role from Ninja Sentai Kakuranger and also appears as Hyuuga of Seijuu Sentai Gingaman.

=== Chiaki Tani ===
Chiaki Tani (谷 千明, Tani Chiaki) is an arrogant former rebel who became Shinken Green (シンケングリーン, Shinken Gurīn) and joined the Shinkengers to fight the Gedoushu.

During the events of the film Gokaiger Goseiger Super Sentai 199 Hero Great Battle, Chiaki takes part in the Legend War before sacrificing his powers to destroy the Zangyack Empire's first invasion fleet and regrouping with teammate Genta Umemori, among other Super Sentai members. In the present, he and Genta appear before the Gokaigers to reaffirm their team's blessing in them.

Chiaki Tani is portrayed by Shogo Suzuki (鈴木 勝吾, Suzuki Shōgo), who reprises his role from Samurai Sentai Shinkenger.

=== Genta Umemori ===
Genta Umemori (梅盛 源太, Umemori Genta) is a sushi vendor and an old friend of Takeru Shiba's who joined the Shinkengers to battle the Gedoushu as Shinken Gold (シンケンゴールド, Shinken Gōrudo).

During the events of the film Gokaiger Goseiger Super Sentai 199 Hero Great Battle, Genta takes part in the Legend War before sacrificing his powers to destroy the Zangyack Empire's first invasion fleet and regrouping with teammate Chiaki Tani, among other Super Sentai members. In the present, he and Chiaki appear before the Gokaigers to reaffirm their team's blessing in them.

Genta Umemori is portrayed by Keisuke Sohma (相馬 圭祐, Sōma Keisuke), who reprises his role from Samurai Sentai Shinkenger.

=== Saki Rōyama ===
Saki Rōyama (楼山 早輝, Rōyama Saki), nicknamed the "Sweet Angel", was a concessions vendor who was chosen by Engine BearRV to become Go-on Yellow (ゴーオンイエロー, Gōon Ierō) and join the Engines and Go-ongers in fighting the Gaiark Clan. Along the way, she briefly forms the G3 Princess (G３プリンセス, Jī Surī Purinsesu) idol group to defeat a separate foe.

During the events of the film Gokaiger Goseiger Super Sentai 199 Hero Great Battle, Saki takes part in the Legend War before sacrificing her powers to destroy the Zangyack Empire's first invasion fleet and regrouping with other Super Sentai members. In the present, she gives the Gokaigers her blessing and access to her team's Great Power. In the film Kaizoku Sentai Gokaiger the Movie: The Flying Ghost Ship, the Gokaigers use the Gorengers' powers to summon an illusion of Saki and her fellow G3 Princess members to help them defeat Baseball Mask.

Saki Rōyama is portrayed by Rina Aizawa (逢沢 りな, Aizawa Rina), who reprises her role from Engine Sentai Go-onger.

=== Satoru Akashi ===
Satoru Akashi (明石 暁, Akashi Satoru) is a treasure hunter who works for the Search Guard Successor (SGS) Foundation and leads the Boukengers as Bouken Red (ボウケンレッド, Bōken Reddo) to find relics known as the "Precious" before the Negative Syndicates do so.

During the events of the film Gokaiger Goseiger Super Sentai 199 Hero Great Battle, Akashi takes part in the Legend War before sacrificing his powers to destroy the Zangyack Empire's first invasion fleet and regrouping with other Super Sentai members. In the present, he gives the Gokaigers his blessing and access to his team's Great Power. In the series, Akashi seeks out the Gokaigers' help in retrieving a Precious called the "Heart of Hades" (黄泉の心臓, Yomi no Shinzō). Following this, Akashi questions whether the Gokaigers' actions were what Aka Red intended for.

Satoru Akashi is portrayed by Mitsuomi Takahashi (高橋 光臣, Takahashi Mitsuomi), who reprises his role from GoGo Sentai Boukenger.

=== Daigoro Oume ===
Daigoro Oume (青梅 大五郎, Ōme Daigorō) is a circus acrobat who was possibly a descendant of the Denji People, became Denji Blue (デンジブルー, Denji Burū), and joined the Denjimen in battling the Vader Clan.

During the events of the film Gokaiger Goseiger Super Sentai 199 Hero Great Battle, Daigoro takes part in the Legend War before sacrificing his powers to destroy the Zangyack Empire's first invasion fleet. Following this, he became a traveling anpan vendor for elementary schools. In the present, he helps Ryo of the Heavenly Fire Star and Koume "Umeko" Kodou in saving a laid-off salaryman before giving the Gokaigers his blessing and access to his team's Great Power. In the film Kaizoku Sentai Gokaiger vs. Space Sheriff Gavan: The Movie, Daigoro and Shiro Akebono help the Gokaigers rescue Retsu Ichijouji.

Daigoro Oume is portrayed by Kenji Ohba (大葉 健二, Ōba Kenji) who reprises his role from Denshi Sentai Denjiman and also appears as Shiro Akebono of Battle Fever J and Retsu Ichijouji of Space Sheriff Gavan.

=== Ryo of the Heavenly Fire Star ===
Ryo of the Heavenly Fire Star (天火星・亮, Tenkasei Ryō) is a descendant of the Dai Tribe who was chosen to become Ryu Ranger (リュウレンジャー, Ryū Renjā) and lead the Dairangers in fighting the Gorma Tribe.

During the events of the film Gokaiger Goseiger Super Sentai 199 Hero Great Battle, Ryo takes part in the Legend War before sacrificing his powers to defeat the Zangyack Empire's first invasion fleet. In the present, Ryo meets Daigoro Oume and Koume "Umeko" Kodou and helps them save a laid-off salaryman before giving the Gokaigers his blessing and access to his team's Great Power. In the series, Ryo encounters Gai Ikari after the latter temporarily lost his transformation equipment and helps the latter realize he did not need them to be a hero.

Ryo of the Heavenly Fire Star is portrayed by Keiichi Wada (和田 圭市, Wada Keiichi), who reprises his role from Gosei Sentai Dairanger.

=== Koume Kodou ===
Koume Kodou (胡堂 小梅, Kodō Koume), affectionately called "Umeko" (ウメコ) by her teammates, is an officer of the S.P.D.'s Earth unit who serves as Deka Pink (デカピンク, Deka Pinku).

During the events of the film Gokaiger Goseiger Super Sentai 199 Hero Great Battle, Umeko takes part in the Legend War before sacrificing her powers to destroy the Zangyack Empire's first invasion fleet. In the present, she and Murphy almost run over a laid-off salaryman before receiving help from Daigoro Oume and Ryo of the Heavenly Fire Star in helping the man. She later appears before the Gokaigers to reaffirm her team's blessing in them.

Koume "Umeko" Kodou is portrayed by Mika Kikuchi (菊地 美香, Kikuchi Mika), who reprises her role from Tokusou Sentai Dekaranger.

=== Kanpei Kuroda ===
Kanpei Kuroda (黒田 官平, Kuroda Kanpei) was a chess club president and janitor who became Goggle Black (ゴーグルブラック, Gōguru Burakku) and joined the Future Science Laboratory's Goggle-V team to fight the Deathdärk Empire.

During the events of the film Gokaiger Goseiger Super Sentai 199 Hero Great Battle, Kanpei takes part in the Legend War before sacrificing his powers to destroy the Zangyack Empire's first invasion fleet. In the present, he gives the Gokaigers his blessing and access to his team's Great Power.

Kanpei Kuroda is portrayed by Jyunichi Haruta (春田 純一, Haruta Jun'ichi), who reprises his role from Dai Sentai Goggle-V.

=== Rei Tachibana ===
Rei Tachibana (立花 レイ, Tachibana Rei) was a fencer who became Dyna Pink (ダイナピンク, Daina Pinku) and joined the Dynamen in fighting the Jashinka Empire.

During the events of the film Gokaiger Goseiger Super Sentai 199 Hero Great Battle, Rei takes part in the Legend War before sacrificing her powers to destroy the Zangyack Empire's first invasion fleet. In the present, she gives the Gokaigers her blessing and access to her team's Great Power.

Rei Tachibana is portrayed by Sayoko Hagiwara (萩原 佐代子, Hagiwara Sayoko), who reprises her role from Kagaku Sentai Dynaman.

=== Shirō Gō ===
Shirō Gō (郷 史朗, Gō Shirō) was a pilot who was showered with Bio Particles and chosen by Bio Robo to become Red One (レッドワン, Reddo Wan) and lead the Biomen in fighting the Neo Empire Gear.

During the events of the film Gokaiger Goseiger Super Sentai 199 Hero Great Battle, Shirō takes part in the Legend War before sacrificing his powers to destroy the Zangyack Empire's first invasion fleet. In the present, he gives the Gokaigers his blessing and access to his team's Great Power.

Shirō Gō is portrayed by Ryosuke Sakamoto (坂元 亮介, Sakamoto Ryōsuke), who reprises his role from Choudenshi Bioman.

=== Riki Honoo ===
Riki Honoo (炎 力, Honō Riki) was the captain of a high school baseball team who was empowered by a combination of magic and science, became Red Turbo (レッドターボ, Reddo Tābo), and led the Turborangers in fighting the Bōma Hundred Tribes.

During the events of the film Gokaiger Goseiger Super Sentai 199 Hero Great Battle, Riki takes part in the Legend War before sacrificing his powers to destroy the Zangyack Empire's first invasion fleet. In the present, he gives the Gokaigers his blessing and access to his team's Great Power.

Riki Honoo is portrayed by Kenta Sato (佐藤 健太, Satō Kenta), who reprises his role from Kousoku Sentai Turboranger.

=== Nozomu Amachi ===
Nozomu Amachi (天知 望, Amachi Nozomu) is an elementary school student who befriends the Goseigers and offers them sanctuary at his and his father's home, the Amachi Institute.

During the events of the film Gokaiger Goseiger Super Sentai 199 Hero Great Battle, Nozomu witnesses the Goseigers and Gokaigers' battle against the Black Cross Colossus and rallies Tokyo's frightened citizens into believing in the Super Sentai's power.

Nozomu Amachi is portrayed by Sakuya Nakamura (中村 咲哉, Nakamura Sakuya), who reprises his role from Tensou Sentai Goseiger.

=== Mikoto Nakadai ===
Mikoto Nakadai (仲代 壬琴, Nakadai Mikoto) was a brilliant doctor who was bored with his life until he found the egg of the Burstosaur, Top Galer, and the Dino Minder brace before using them to fight the Abarangers as Abare Killer (アバレキラー, Abare Kirā) until he has a change of heart and helps them defeat the Evoliens before dying as a result of the Dino Minder's instability.

The ghosts of Mikoto, Dragon Ranger, and Time Fire appear before Gai Ikari in his dreams to give him the ability to transform into Gokai Silver and access to their respective teams' Great Powers.

Mikoto Nakadai is portrayed by Koutaro Tanaka (田中 幸太朗, Tanaka Kōtarō), who reprises his role from Bakuryū Sentai Abaranger.

=== Ryouma ===
Ryouma (リョウマ, Ryōma) is a resident of the Ginga Forest with power over fire who assumed the title of Ginga Red (ギンガレッド, Ginga Reddo) to honor his brother Hyuuga and led the Gingamen in their fight against the Balban space pirates.

Ryouma makes a minor appearance in the series, accepting the Gokaigers as the 35th Super Sentai team despite them being space pirates.

Ryouma is portrayed by Kazuki Maehara (前原 一輝, Maehara Kazuki), who reprises his role from Seijuu Sentai Gingaman.

=== Matsuri Tatsumi ===
Matsuri Tatsumi (巽 マツリ, Tatsumi Matsuri) is an EMT and the youngest member of the Tatsumi family who became Go Pink (ゴーピンク, Gō Pinku) and supported her brothers in the GoGoFive team in their battle against the Psyma Family.

Luka Millfy and Ahim de Famille encounter Matsuri as part of their quest to find the Greatest Treasure in the Universe. After seeing the Gokaigers battle Basco Ta Jolokia, Matsuri gives the pirates her blessing and access to her team's Great Power.

Matsuri Tatsumi is portrayed by Kayoko Shibata (柴田 かよこ, Shibata Kayoko), who reprises her role from Kyuukyuu Sentai GoGoFive.

=== Miu Sutō ===
Miu Sutō (須塔 美羽, Sutō Miu), nicknamed the "Lovely Sensation", is a socialite with a princess-like attitude who was chosen by Engine Jetras to join the Go-on Wings in fighting the Gaiark Clan as Go-on Silver (ゴーオンシルバー, Gōon Shirubā). Along the way, she briefly forms the G3 Princess idol group to defeat a separate foe.

During the events of the film Kaizoku Sentai Gokaiger the Movie: The Flying Ghost Ship, the Gokaigers use the Gorengers' powers to summon an illusion of Miu and her fellow G3 Princess members to help them defeat Baseball Mask. After the Gokaigers defeat the Zangyack Empire in the series finale, Miu regains her powers and expresses gratitude to the pirates.

Miu Sutō is portrayed by Yumi Sugimoto (杉本 有美, Sugimoto Yumi), who reprises her role from Engine Sentai Go-onger.

=== Ninpuu Sentai Hurricaneger ===
Ninpuu Sentai Hurricaneger (忍風戦隊ハリケンジャー, Ninpū Sentai Harikenjā) are the 26th Super Sentai team and a trio of ninjas from the Hayate Way's Ninja Academy consisting of Yousuke Shiina (椎名 鷹介, Shiina Yōsuke), Nanami Nono (野乃 七海, Nono Nanami), and Kouta Bitou (尾藤 吼太, Bitō Kōta), who battled the Space-Ninja Group Jakanja.

After sensing the sons of two of Jakanja's fallen members within the Zangyack Empire's ranks, the Hurricanegers confront the Gokaigers for their powers back. Despite initial reluctance on the pirates' part, they agree and join forces with the ninjas to defeat Satarakura Jr., during which the Hurricanegers give the Gokaigers their blessing and access to their team's Great Power.

Yousuke Shiina, Nanami Nono, and Kouta Bitou are portrayed by Shun Shioya (塩谷 瞬, Shioya Shun), Nao Nagasawa (長澤 奈央, Nagasawa Nao), and Kohei Yamamoto (山本 康平, Yamamoto Kōhei) respectively, all of whom reprise their roles from Ninpuu Sentai Hurricaneger.

=== Gai Yuki ===
Gai Yuki (結城 凱, Yūki Gai) was a loner who was hit by Birdonic Waves and drafted into the Sky Force's Jetmen to fight Vyram as Black Condor (ブラックコンドル, Burakku Kondoru). In the process, he developed a rivalry with team leader Ryū Tendō / Red Hawk over the affections of their teammate Kaori Rokumeikan / White Swan. After the Jetmen defeated Vyram, Yuki was fatally wounded while on his way to Rokumeikan and Tendō's wedding to give them his blessing.

While playing cards with God in the Golden Gate bar, Yuki convinces the latter to let him return to Earth long enough to help the Gokaigers obtain his team's Great Power and test Captain Marvelous' resolve to protect his teammates.

Gai Yuki is portrayed by Toshihide Wakamatsu (若松 俊秀, Wakamatsu Toshihide), who reprises his role from Chōjin Sentai Jetman.

=== Yukito Sanjo ===
Yukito Sanjo (三条 幸人, Sanjō Yukito) was a chiropractor who was chosen by the Burstosaur Triceratops to become Abare Blue (アバレブルー, Abare Burū) and join him and the Abarangers in fighting the Evoliens. Once the Evoliens were defeated and the Burstosaurs returned to Dino Earth, Sanjo resumed his work as a chiropractor and eventually married his secretary Emiri Imanaka.

The Sanjos appear before the Gokaigers to help them unlock the full potential of the Abarangers' Great Power.

Yukito Sanjo is portrayed by Sho Tomita (富田 翔, Tomita Shō), who reprises his role from Bakuryū Sentai Abaranger.

=== Emiri Sanjo ===
Emiri Sanjo (née Imanaka) (三条（今中） 笑里, Sanjō (Imanaka) Emiri) was a high school student chosen by the Burstosaurs to help them in their fight against the Evoliens. While she was unable to become an Abaranger, she supported them nonetheless, occasionally assuming a homemade form called Abare Pink (アバレピンク, Abare Pinku) along the way. After the Abarangers defeated the Evoliens, Emiri was hired by Yukito Sanjo to become his secretary and they eventually married.

While accompanying Yukito in helping the Gokaigers unlock the full potential of the Abarangers' Great Power, Emiri gives Ahim de Famille an Abare Pink Ranger Key the former made.

Emiri Sanjo (née Imanaka) is portrayed by Michi Nishijima (西島 未智, Nishijima Michi), who reprises her role from Bakuryū Sentai Abaranger.

=== Joh Ohara ===
Joh Ohara (大原 丈, Ōhara Jō) was an underachieving student at Academia Island who became Yellow Lion (イエローライオン, Ierō Raion) and joined the Livemen to fight the Volt Army, who manipulated three of his classmates into joining them and killed two of his friends. After rescuing his friend Goh Omura from Volt and defeating Volt's leader, Great Professor Bias, Joh becomes a professor to prevent history from repeating itself.

Joh encounters Joe Gibken and Ahim de Famille while the pair were searching for him and assists them in rescuing boxers from the Zangyack Empire. Along the way, Joh uncovers Zangyack's plan to convert physically fit humans into cyborgs, hints at his being part of the Livemen, relates his experiences with Volt to Joe to help the pirate come to terms with his own friend turned enemy, and gives Joe access to the Livemen's Great Power.

Joh Ohara is portrayed by Kazuhiko Nishimura (西村 和彦, Nishimura Kazuhiko), who reprises his role from Choujyu Sentai Liveman.

=== Sho Hayate ===
Sho Hayate (疾風 翔, Hayate Shō) was a narcissistic Japanese Army Ranger and womanizer who became Change Gryphon (チェンジグリフォン, Chenji Gurifon) and joined the Earth Defense Force's Changemen to battle the Great Star League Gozma.

Sometime after the Legend War, Sho is attacked by Basco Ta Jolokia, who steals his team's Great Power. In response, he contacts Goro Hoshino of UAOH to warn him of Basco. After the Gokaigers defeat Basco, Sho appears before the pirates to give them his blessing and access to the Great Power.

Sho Hayate is portrayed by Kazuoki (和興), who reprises his role from Dengeki Sentai Changeman.

=== Goro Hoshino ===
Captain Goro Hoshino (星野 吾郎, Hoshino Gorō) is an ace pilot and team leader of the United Airforce Overtech Hardware (UAOH) who became Oh Red (オーレッド, Ō Reddo) to lead the Ohrangers in their fight against the Baranoia Empire.

After learning Basco Ta Jolokia stole the Changemen's Great Power, Goro sends his subordinate and teammate, Momo Maruo, to give the Gokaigers their team's Great Power while he distracts Basco. However, the pirates refuse to accept the Great Power unless they earned it themselves before doing so while fighting Basco.

Goro Hoshino is portrayed by Masaru Shishido (宍戸 勝, Shishido Masaru), who reprises his role from Chouriki Sentai Ohranger.

=== Momo Maruo ===
First Lieutenant Momo Maruo (丸尾 桃, Maruo Momo) is the youngest member of the UAOH and the Ohrangers who fought the Baranoia Empire as Oh Pink (オーピンク, Ō Pinku).

Momo's superior and team leader, Goro Hoshino, sends her to give the Gokaigers their team's Great Power before Basco Ta Jolokia can steal it. However, the pirates refuse unless they earned it themselves, which they do while fighting Basco.

Momo Maruo is portrayed by Tamao Satō (さとう 珠緒, Satō Tamao), who reprises her role from Chouriki Sentai Ohranger.

=== Bomper ===
Bomper (ボンパー, Bonpā) is a pink radar robot created by Engine Jum-bowhale and an inhabitant of Machine World who supported the Go-ongers in their fight against the Gaiark Clan by creating their arsenal and performing maintenance on the Engines.

While helping the Engines liberate Gunman World from the Gaiark, Bomper ends up in Human World, lands in the Gokaigers' Gokai Galleon, and asks the pirates to reunite him with his ally, Sōsuke Esumi.

Bomper is voiced by Akiko Nakagawa (中川 亜紀子, Nakagawa Akiko), who reprises her role from Engine Sentai Go-onger.

=== Sōsuke Esumi ===
Sōsuke Esumi (江角 走輔, Esumi Sōsuke), nicknamed the "Speed King", is a former racer with a sunny disposition who was chosen by Engine Speedor to become Go-on Red (ゴーオンレッド, Gōon Reddo) and lead the Go-ongers in their fight against the Gaiark Clan.

After the Gokaigers rescue Sōsuke's ally, Bomper, the latter guides them to Sōsuke, who asks the Gokaigers to help the Engines liberate Gunman World from the Gaiark. The pirates refuse, having already acquired the Go-ongers' Great Power, but agree to help after watching Sōsuke fail repeatedly to reach Gunman World. Despite being barred from Human World by the Gaiark Clan's leader, Babatcheed, Sōsuke accompanies the Gokaigers in traveling to Machine World to ask for Engine Machalcon's help in getting back.

Sōsuke Esumi is portrayed by Yasuhisa Furuhara (古原 靖久, Furuhara Yasuhisa), who reprises his role from Engine Sentai Go-onger.

=== Engines ===
Engines (炎神, Enjin) Speedor (スピードル, Supīdoru), Bus-on (バスオン, Basuon), and BearRV (ベアールＶ（ブイ）, Beārubui) are giant vehicle-like denizens of Machine World who partnered with the Go-ongers to battle the Gaiark Clan.

While battling Chirakashizky in Gunman World, the Gaiark member drains the Engines' power. They are later reunited with Sōsuke Esumi and reveal that Speedor and BearRV had a son, Machalcon, whom they never see due to their battles with the Gaiark.

Engines Speedor, Bus-on, and BearRV are voiced by Daisuke Namikawa (浪川 大輔, Namikawa Daisuke), Hisao Egawa (江川 央生, Egawa Hisao), and Miki Inoue (井上 美紀, Inoue Miki) respectively, all of whom reprise their roles from Engine Sentai Go-onger.

=== Kenta Date ===
Kenta Date (伊達 健太, Date Kenta) was originally an underachieving senior at Moroboshi High School who was chosen to become Mega Red (メガレッド, Mega Reddo) after winning an INET recruitment device disguised as an arcade game and led the Megarangers in fighting the Nezirejia Kingdom. Sometime after defeating Nezirejia's leader, Doctor Hinelar, Kenta became a teacher at Moroboshi High.

After the Gokaigers seek him out for his team's Great Power, Kenta offers to give it to them if they become students for a day. While watching their progress from afar, he is captured by Basco Ta Jolokia, who threatens to detonate bombs he had placed all over Moroboshi High unless Date gives him the Megarangers' Great Power. However, the Gokaigers intervene, defeating Basco and safely removing the bombs. Afterwards, Kenta gives the pirates his team's Great Power as promised.

Kenta Date is portrayed by Hayato Ōshiba (大柴 隼人, Ōshiba Hayato), who reprises his role from Denji Sentai Megaranger.

=== Domon ===
Domon (ドモン) is a womanizer, professional grappler, and a member of the Time Defense Bureau (TPD) from the year 3000 who became Time Yellow (タイムイエロー, Taimu Ierō) and joined the Timerangers in traveling back in time to the year 2000 to apprehend the Londerz Family. While in the past, Domon revealed his identity to and entered a relationship with journalist, Honami Moriyama, unknowingly conceiving a son with her in the process. Once the Timerangers' mission was over, Domon failed to learn of his son before returning to his time.

After learning the Matrintis Empire destroyed the Negakure Shrine, depriving the Gokaigers of the Kakurangers' Great Power, Domon tasks the pirates with traveling back in time to the year 2010 to prevent the shrine's destruction. After the Gokaigers succeed, they send Domon a picture they took of themselves, Moriyama, and Domon's son.

Domon is portrayed by Shūhei Izumi (和泉 宗兵, Izumi Shūhei), who reprises his role from Mirai Sentai Timeranger.

=== Honami Moriyama ===
Honami Moriyama (森山 ホナミ, Moriyama Honami) is a journalist who discovered the Timerangers' secret identities while taking photos of the Londerz Family and falls in love with Timeranger member, Domon, conceiving a son she later names Mirai with him in the process.

While in the year 2010 to prevent the Negakure Shrine's destruction, the Gokaigers encounter Honami and help her reconcile with Mirai.

Honami Moriyama is portrayed by Tamao Yoshimura (吉村 玉緒, Yoshimura Tamao), who reprises her role from Mirai Sentai Timeranger.

=== Mirai Moriyama ===
Mirai Moriyama (森山 未来, Moriyama Mirai), initially and jokingly referred to as "Domon Jr.", is Honami Moriyama and Domon's son that she never told him about.

While in the year 2010 to prevent the Negakure Shrine's destruction, the Gokaigers encounter Mirai, who ran away from home in protest over Honami's journalism career resulting in their constantly moving before he can make friends. Gai Ikari helps him reconcile with his mother before indirectly revealing Mirai's existence to Domon.

Mirai Moriyama is portrayed by Asuka Komiya (小宮 明日翔, Komiya Asuka).

=== Shiro Akebono ===
Shiro Akebono (曙 四郎, Akebono Shirō) was a member of Japan's National Defense Ministry and a wild child who can talk to animals who was chosen to join the Battle Fever team and fight the Secret Society Egos as Battle Kenya (バトルケニア, Batoru Kenia).

Accompanied by his pet panda, Shiro disguises himself as Santa Claus to observe the Gokaigers during Christmas and see if they are worthy of his team's Great Power. After the pirates save Christmas from the Zangyack Empire, Shiro gives them his blessing and his team's Great Power as a present. In the film Kaizoku Sentai Gokaiger vs. Space Sheriff Gavan: The Movie, Shiro and Daigoro Oume help the Gokaigers rescue Retsu Ichijouji.

Shiro Akebono is portrayed by Kenji Ohba, who reprises his role from Battle Fever J and also appears as Daigoro Oume of Denshi Sentai Denjiman and Retsu Ichijouji of Space Sheriff Gavan.

=== Ninjaman ===
Ninjaman (ニンジャマン) is a pupil of the Three Shinshou who was sealed in a pot after being tricked by Daimaou of the Youkai Army Corps into attacking people centuries ago until Tsuruhime frees him in 1994 to assist her and the Kakurangers in fighting the Youkai. Once the Youkai were sealed, Ninjaman and his mentors part ways with the Kakurangers on good terms.

Following this however, Ninjaman's reckless methods for saving a girl from rampaging zoo animals led to the Shinshou sealing him in a pot once more and place him in the Negakure Shrine to think about what he did for a decade. In 2010, the Gokaigers free Ninjaman so he can help them acquire the Kakurangers' Great Power. After learning of what happened since his second sealing, Ninjaman tests the pirates to see if they are worthy of the Great Power before joining forces with them to stop Zangyack forces and learning he was the Great Power in the process. After the battle, he parts ways with the Gokaigers, promising to help them again should they need him.

Ninjaman is voiced by Kazuki Yao (矢尾 一樹, Yao Kazuki), who reprises his role from Ninja Sentai Kakuranger.

=== Tsuruhime ===
Tsuruhime (鶴姫) was the twenty-fourth protector of the Seal Door and the leader of the Kakurangers despite being the youngest member who fought the Youkai Army Corps as Ninja White (ニンジャホワイト, Ninja Howaito).

Tsuruhime seeks out the Gokaigers to see if they are worthy of her team's Great Power, only to learn they had met Ninjaman and leaves him to fulfill her task instead.

Tsuruhime is portrayed by Satomi Hirose (広瀬 仁美, Hirose Satomi), who reprises her role from Ninja Sentai Kakuranger.

=== Bae ===
Bae (バエ) is a practitioner of the Geki Jū Fly-Ken (激獣フライ拳, Geki Jū Furaiken) style who enjoys commentating on giant battles and was originally dependent on Mere to survive until he absorbed some of Long's Rinki and joined the Gekirangers following Mere's death.

As of the film Kaizoku Sentai Gokaiger vs. Space Sheriff Gavan: The Movie, Bae was imprisoned in the Zangyack Empire's Makuu Prison until the Gokaigers free him and the other inmates.

Bae is voiced by Akira Ishida (石田 彰, Ishida Akira), who reprises his role from Juken Sentai Gekiranger.

=== Yatsudenwani ===
Trinoid #12: Yatsudenwani (トリノイド第12号 ヤツデンワニ, Torinoido Dai Jūni-gō Yatsudenwani) is a Fatsia japonica/telephone/crocodile-themed monster created by the Evoliens to fight the Abarangers who defected to them instead and eventually became the president of the Dino House curry restaurant.

As of the film Kaizoku Sentai Gokaiger vs. Space Sheriff Gavan: The Movie, Yatsudenwani was imprisoned in the Zangyack Empire's Makuu Prison until the Gokaigers free him and the other inmates. During the events of Tokumei Sentai Go-Busters vs. Kaizoku Sentai Gokaiger: The Movie, a past version of Yatsudenwani treats Captain Marvelous to curry after the latter was sent back in time to 2005 until Hiromu Sakurada interrupts them.

Yatsudenwani is voiced by Kyōsei Tsukui (津久井 教生, Tsukui Kyōsei), who reprises his role from Bakuryū Sentai Abaranger.

=== Takayuki Hiba ===
Takayuki Hiba (飛羽 高之, Hiba Takayuki) was a member of the Guardians of World Peace who was selected to succeed his colleague, Ryusuke Ohwashi, as the leader of the Sun Vulcan team and become Vul Eagle II (2代目バルイーグル, Nidaime Baru Īguru) to fight the Machine Empire Black Magma.

After the Gokaigers defeat Basco Ta Jolokia, who had stolen the Sun Vulcan team's Great Power, Takayuki appears before the pirates to give them his blessing and access to the Great Power. Following the Gokaigers defeating the Zangyack Empire in the series finale, he receives his powers back and salutes the pirates as a sign of thanks.

Takayuki Hiba is portrayed by Takayuki Godai (五代 高之, Godai Takayuki), who reprises his role from Taiyo Sentai Sun Vulcan.

=== Dai ===
Dai (ダイ) was one of five children who were abducted by the Mess Empire for use as guinea pigs until the inhabitants of Planet Flash rescued and raised them, with Dai being raised on the rocky Green Star and developing enhanced strength as a result. In adulthood, he became Green Flash (グリーンフラッシュ, Gurīn Furasshu), joined the other abductees in forming the Flashmen, and returned to Earth to stop Mess from conquering it.

After the Gokaigers defeat Basco Ta Jolokia, who had stolen the Flashmen's Great Power, Dai appears before the pirates to give them his blessing and access to the Great Power.

Dai is portrayed by Kihachiro Uemura (植村 喜八郎, Uemura Kihachirō), who reprises his role from Choushinsei Flashman.

=== Akira ===
Akira (アキラ) was a Chinese boxer and straight sword expert who was trained by Commander Sanjuro Sugata to obtain Aura Power, became Blue Mask (ブルーマスク, Burū Masuku), and joined the Maskmen in fighting the Underground Empire Tube.

After the Gokaigers defeat Basco Ta Jolokia, who had stolen the Maskmen's Great Power, Akira appears before the pirates to give them his blessing and access to the Great Power.

Akira is portrayed by Issei Hirota (廣田 一成, Hirota Issei), who reprises his role from Hikari Sentai Maskman.

=== Remi Hoshikawa ===
Remi Hoshikawa (星川 レミ, Hoshikawa Remi) was a music teacher and the youngest member of the Fivemen family who joined them in fighting the Silver Imperial Army Zone as Five Yellow (ファイブイエロー, Faibu Ierō).

After the Gokaigers defeat Basco Ta Jolokia, who had stolen the Fivemen's Great Power, Remi appears before the pirates to give them her blessing and access to the Great Power. Following the Gokaigers defeating the Zangyack Empire in the series finale, she receives her powers back and expresses gratitude to the pirates.

Remi Hoshikawa is portrayed by Ryo Narushima (成嶋 涼, Narushima Ryō), who reprises her role from Chikyu Sentai Fiveman.

=== Goushi ===
Goushi (ゴウシ, Gōshi) was a Sharma Tribe knight who became Mammoth Ranger (マンモスレンジャー, Manmosu Renjā) and joined the Zyurangers in fighting the Bandora Gang.

Amidst the Zangyack Empire's last-ditch attempt to conquer Earth and destroy the Gokaigers, Goushi tells Gai Ikari not to worry about what will happen to him and the other Super Sentai groups if the Gokaigers use the Greatest Treasure in the Universe. After the Gokaigers defeat the Zangyack Empire, Goushi receives his powers back and expresses gratitude to the pirates.

Goushi is portrayed by Seiju Umon (右門 青寿, Umon Seiju), who reprises his role from Kyōryū Sentai Zyuranger.

=== Shuichirou Amachi ===
Professor Shuichirou Amachi (天知 秀一郎博士, Amachi Shūichirō-hakase) is an amateur astronomer and single father to Nozomu Amachi who runs the Amachi Institute. He hires the Goseigers as part-timers despite initially being unaware of their actions until he eventually learns the truth and supports them nonetheless.

Amidst the Zangyack Empire's last-ditch attempt to conquer Earth and destroy the Gokaigers, Joe Gibken and Don Dogoier witness Shuichirou rescuing injured civilians.

Shuichirou Amachi is portrayed by Louis Yamada LIII (山田ルイ53世, Yamada Rui Gojūsan-sei), who reprises his role from Tensou Sentai Goseiger.

=== Yuka Yamazaki ===
Yuka Yamazaki (山崎 由佳, Yamazaki Yuka) was a classmate of Kai Ozu, who developed a crush on her. When she was kidnapped by Glúm do Bridon, Kai as Magi Red rescued her and inadvertently revealed his secret identity to her.

Amidst the Zangyack Empire's last-ditch attempt to conquer Earth and destroy the Gokaigers, Joe Gibken and Don Dogoier witness Yuka comfort an injured civilian with a Magi Red plush doll she had made as a good luck charm.

Yuka Yamazaki is portrayed by Kaoru Hirata (平田 薫, Hirata Kaoru), who reprises her role from Mahō Sentai Magiranger.

=== Houka Ozu ===
Houka Ozu (小津 芳香, Ozu Hōka) is the oldest daughter of the Magiranger family who joined them in fighting the Infershia Empire as Magi Pink (マジピンク, Maji Pinku).

After the Gokaigers defeat the Zangyack Empire in the series finale, Houka happily receives her powers back and thanks the pirates.

Houka Ozu is portrayed by Ayumi Beppu (別府 あゆみ, Beppu Ayumi), who reprises her role from Mahō Sentai Magiranger.

=== Shou Tatsumi ===
Shou Tatsumi (巽 鐘, Tatsumi Shō) is the third son of the Tatsumi family and a helicopter pilot in the Central City Fire Department's Aviation Department who became Go Green (ゴーグリーン, Gō Gurīn) and joined his siblings in the GoGoFive team to fight the Psyma Family.

After the Gokaigers defeat the Zangyack Empire in the series finale, Shou receives his powers back and salutes the pirates as thanks.

Shou Tatsumi is portrayed by Atsushi Harada (原田 篤, Harada Atsushi), who reprises his role from Kyuukyuu Sentai GoGoFive.

=== Shoji of the Heavenly Gravity Star ===
Shoji of the Heavenly Gravity Star (天重星・将児, Tenjūsei Shōji) was a member of a bōsōzoku gang who dreamed of becoming a world boxing champion before becoming Tenma Ranger (テンマレンジャー, Tenma Renjā) and joining the Dairangers in fighting the Gorma Tribe.

After the Gokaigers defeat the Zangyack Empire in the series finale, Shoji and his teammate Kazu of the Heavenly Time Star receive their powers back and thank the pirates.

Shoji of the Heavenly Gravity Star is portrayed by Ei Hamura (羽村 英, Hamura Ei), who reprises his role from Gosei Sentai Dairanger.

=== Kazu of the Heavenly Time Star ===
Kazu of the Heavenly Time Star (天時星・知, Tenjisei Kazu) was a stylish beautician and dancer who became Kirin Ranger (キリンレンジャー, Kirin Renjā) and joined the Dairangers in fighting the Gorma Tribe.

After the Gokaigers defeat the Zangyack Empire in the series finale, Kazu and his teammate Shoji of the Heavenly Gravity Star receive their powers back and thank the pirates.

Kazu of the Heavenly Time Star is portrayed by Keisuke Tsuchiya (土屋 圭輔, Tsuchiya Keisuke), who reprises his role from Gosei Sentai Dairanger.

== Past antagonists ==
In addition to the various new antagonists introduced in Kaizoku Sentai Gokaiger, several antagonists from prior Super Sentai series appear as well, with some forming an alliance with Zangyack while others pursue their own agenda.

=== Black Cross King ===
The Black Cross King (黒十字王, Kuro Jūji Ō), formerly the Black Cross Führer (黒十字総統, Kuro Jūji Sōtō), was the leader of the Black Cross Army who battled the Gorengers until they exploited his weakness to the Cassiopeia constellation's cosmic rays to destroy him.

During the events of the crossover film Gokaiger Goseiger Super Sentai 199 Hero Great Battle, the Black Cross Führer is revived by the combined hatred of the first 34 Super Sentai teams' enemies as the Black Cross King and forms an alliance with Zangyack in order to seek revenge on all Super Sentai and their supporters. To assist him and battle the Gokaigers and Goseigers, he revives several fallen Sentai enemies as members of the Black Cross Army while he steals the Gokaigers' Ranger Keys in order to turn them into his personal army. After the Gokaigers and Goseigers retrieve the keys, the Black Cross King enlarges himself, but is briefly defeated by the two Sentai teams via the Super Sentai Bazooka. While he transforms into his true form, the Black Cross Colossus (黒十字巨人, Kuro Jūji Kyojin) and resurrects several more past Sentai enemies, he is destroyed by Goren GokaiOh. In the crossover film, Kamen Rider × Super Sentai: Super Hero Taisen, the Black Cross King is revived once more and joins Dai-Zangyack, who form an alliance with Dai-Shocker in a plot to destroy the Super Sentai and Kamen Riders, only to be defeated by them.

The Black Cross King is voiced by Akira Kamiya (神谷 明, Kamiya Akira).

=== Brajira ===
Brajira of the Messiah (救星主のブラジラ, Kyūseishu no Burajira) was a fallen Gosei Angel who manipulated various groups to battle the Goseigers before giving up his life in an attempt to enact his Nega End Ceremony to destroy Earth and reshape it in his image, only to be foiled by the Goseigers.

During the events of the crossover film Gokaiger Goseiger Super Sentai 199 Hero Great Battle, the Black Cross King revives Brajira as Messiah of the Black Cross Brajira (黒十字の救星主ブラジラ, Kuro Jūji no Kyūseishu Burajira) to help him destroy the Gokaigers and Goseigers, but the latter is defeated by Gokai Red and Gosei Red. After transforming into the Black Cross Colossus, the Black Cross King revives Brajira once more, who summons phantoms of his Buredoran forms before he is destroyed by the first 35 Super Sentai teams' mecha. In the crossover film, Kamen Rider × Super Sentai: Super Hero Taisen, Brajira is revived once more and joins Dai-Zangyack, who form an alliance with Dai-Shocker in a plot to destroy the Super Sentai and Kamen Riders, only to be defeated by them.

Brajira is voiced by Nobuo Tobita (飛田 展男, Tobita Nobuo), who reprises his role from Tensou Sentai Goseiger.

=== Yogoshimacritein ===
Crime Minister Yogoshimacritein (総裏大臣ヨゴシマクリタイン, Sōridaijin Yogoshimakuritain) was the leader of the Gaiark Clan's Human World invasion force who fell in battle against the Go-ongers.

During the events of the crossover film Gokaiger Goseiger Super Sentai 199 Hero Great Battle, the Black Cross King revives Yogoshimacritein as Crime Minister of the Black Cross Yogoshimacritein (黒十字の総裏大臣ヨゴシマクリタイン, Kuro Jūji no Sōridaijin Yogoshimakuritain) to help him destroy the Gokaigers and Goseigers, but the latter is defeated by Gokai Blue and Yellow and Gosei Black and Yellow. After transforming into the Black Cross Colossus, the Black Cross King revives Yogoshimacritein once more, who summons phantoms of his subordinates, Chirakasonne and Kireizky, before they are destroyed by the first 35 Super Sentai teams' mecha.

Yogoshimacritein is voiced by Kiyoyuki Yanada (梁田 清之, Yanada Kiyoyuki), who reprises his role from Engine Sentai Go-onger.

=== Dagon ===
Hades God Dagon (冥府神ダゴン, Meifushin Dagon) was the seemingly invincible leader of the Infershia Pantheon who battled the Magirangers while attempting to revive the Infershia Empire's ruler, N Ma, only to be killed by turncoat Hades Goddess, Sphinx.

During the events of the crossover film Gokaiger Goseiger Super Sentai 199 Hero Great Battle, the Black Cross King revives Dagon as Hades God of the Black Cross Dagon (黒十字の冥府神ダゴン, Kuro Jūji no Meifushin Dagon) to help him destroy the Gokaigers and Goseigers, but the latter is defeated by Gokai Green and Pink and Gosei Pink and Blue. After transforming into the Black Cross Colossus, the Black Cross King revives Dagon once more, who summons phantoms of his fellow Hades Gods, Ifrit and Cyclops, before they are destroyed by the first 35 Super Sentai teams' mecha. In the crossover film, Kamen Rider × Super Sentai: Super Hero Taisen, Dagon is revived once more and joins Dai-Zangyack, who form an alliance with Dai-Shocker in a plot to destroy the Super Sentai and Kamen Riders, only to be defeated by them.

Dagon is voiced by Akio Ōtsuka (大塚 明夫, Ōtsuka Akio), who reprises his role from Mahō Sentai Magiranger.

=== Ryuuwon ===
Creator King Ryuuwon (創造王リュウオーン, Sōzōō Ryūōn) was the leader of the Jaryuu Clan and an enemy of the Boukengers until he died when the SGS Foundation's Precious Bank self-destructed.

Five years after his death, one of Ryuuwon's Jaryuu locates a Precious called the Heart of Hades (黄泉の心臓, Yomi no Shinzō) and sacrifices itself to use it to resurrect Ryuuwon, albeit in a half-rotted state, so he can seek revenge against the Boukengers. While Captain Marvelous pulls the Heart of Hades out of Ryuuwon's chest, this causes the latter to go berserk and enlarge himself before he is destroyed by GokaiOh via the Boukengers' Great Power.

Ryuuwon is voiced by Junpei Morita (森田 順平, Morita Junpei), who reprises his role from GoGo Sentai Boukenger.

=== Baseball Mask ===
Baseball Mask (野球仮面, Yakyū Kamen) is a baseball-themed member of the Black Cross Army who was destroyed by the Gorengers, who exploited his inability to hit changeups.

During the events of the film Kaizoku Sentai Gokaiger the Movie: The Flying Ghost Ship, Baseball Mask's spirit challenges the Gokaigers to a baseball match while they were on Los Dark's ghost ship. While the Gokaigers use the Gorengers' powers to defeat him, Baseball Mask takes his second death gracefully.

Baseball Mask is voiced by Ichirō Nagai (永井 一郎, Nagai Ichirō), who reprises his role from Himitsu Sentai Gorenger.

=== Agent Abrella ===
Agent Abrella (エージェント・アブレラ, Ējento Aburera) is an alien arms dealer from Planet Rain who supplied various Alienizers while working on his own scheme to eliminate the Dekarangers, only to be killed by them.

During the events of the film Kaizoku Sentai Gokaiger the Movie: The Flying Ghost Ship, the Gokaigers encounter Abrella's spirit and army of Mechanoids while on Los Dark's ghost ship. On a gambit, the other Gokaigers battle Abrella and the Mechanoids while Captain Marvelous takes the God's Eye from Los Dark and uses it to bring his shipmates back to the land of the living.

Agent Abrella is voiced by Ryūsei Nakao (中尾 隆聖, Nakao Ryūsei), who reprises his role from Tokusou Sentai Dekaranger.

=== Kegalesia ===
Water Pollution Minister Kegalesia (害水大臣ケガレシア, Gaisui Daijin Kegareshia) was one of the Gaiark Clan's pollution ministers who fought the Go-ongers, briefly forming the G3 Princess idol group to defeat a separate foe along the way. After being mistreated by her leader Yogoshimacritein, she and her fellow pollution minister Kitaneydas weaken him before Yogoshimacritein scraps them for their betrayal. As of the crossover film Samurai Sentai Shinkenger vs. Go-onger: GinmakuBang!!, Kegalesia, Kitaneydas, and fellow pollution minister Yogostein ended up in the Sanzu River before the Gaiark's new leader, Batcheed, resurrects them to assist in his plans. However, the ministers choose not to in favor of returning to the Sanzu River, indirectly helping the Go-ongers and Shinkengers defeat Batcheed in the process.

In the film Kaizoku Sentai Gokaiger the Movie: The Flying Ghost Ship, the Gokaigers use the Gorengers' powers to summon an illusion of Kegalesia and her fellow G3 Princess members to help them defeat Baseball Mask. As of the crossover film Kaizoku Sentai Gokaiger vs. Space Sheriff Gavan: The Movie, Kegalesia and her fellow ministers were imprisoned in the Zangyack Empire's Makuu Prison before the Gokaigers free them and the other inmates.

Kegalesia is portrayed by Nao Oikawa (及川 奈央, Oikawa Nao), who reprises her role from Engine Sentai Go-onger.

=== Shitari ===
Shitari of the Bones (骨のシタリ, Hone no Shitari) is a squid-headed demon and the Gedoushu's strategist who awaited his leader, Doukoku Chimatsuri's revival following the latter's death in battle against the Shinkengers.

In the crossover film Tensou Sentai Goseiger vs. Shinkenger: Epic on Ginmaku and the Kaizoku Sentai Gokaiger episode "The Future is in the Past", Shitari gathered an army of Doukoku loyalists to kill Brajira, who assumed command of the Gedoushu. However, they are destroyed by the Gokaigers, who had traveled back in time for an unrelated mission and sought to repay the Shinkengers and Goseigers for their Great Powers.

Shitari of the Bones is voiced by Chō (チョー), who reprises his role from Samurai Sentai Shinkenger.

=== Metal Alice ===
Metal Alice of the Agent (エージェントのメタルA（アリス）, Ējento no Metaru Arisu) is Robogorg's personal attendant, a Matrintis Empire marshal, and the first high-spec Matroid built by her master to serve him.

Prior to her and Robogorg's battle with the Goseigers, Metal Alice sends Zan-KT0 of the Shot to investigate a power source she detected in the Negakure Shrine. While the Matroid is destroyed by the Gokaigers, who had traveled back in time to prevent the shrine's destruction, Metal Alice chooses to modify the Zan-KT specs in preparation for the Goseigers instead of pursuing the Gokaigers.

Metal Alice is voiced by Marina Inoue (井上 麻里奈, Inoue Marina), who reprises her role from Tensou Sentai Goseiger.

=== Gekkou ===
Gekkou of Illusions (幻のゲッコウ, Maboroshi no Gekkō) is the owl-like leader of the Dark Shadow ninja clan who sends his servants to retrieve Precious to sell on the black market, which brought them into conflict with the Boukengers.

As of the crossover film Kaizoku Sentai Gokaiger vs. Space Sheriff Gavan: The Movie, Gekkou was imprisoned in the Zangyack Empire's Makuu Prison before the Gokaigers free him and the other inmates.

Gekkou of Illusions is voiced by Banjō Ginga (銀河 万丈, Ginga Banjō), who reprises his role from GoGo Sentai Boukenger.

=== Shizuka ===
Shizuka of the Wind (風のシズカ, Kaze no Shizuka) is a Dark Shadow kunoichi who carried the task of obtaining Precious and embarking in business affairs for the clan, fighting the Boukengers along the way.

As of the crossover film Kaizoku Sentai Gokaiger vs. Space Sheriff Gavan: The Movie, Shizuka was imprisoned in the Zangyack Empire's Makuu Prison before the Gokaigers free her and the other inmates.

Shizuka of the Wind is portrayed by Mami Yamasaki (山崎 真実, Yamasaki Mami), who reprises her role from GoGo Sentai Boukenger.

=== Yogostein ===
Land Pollution Minister Yogostein (害地大臣ヨゴシュタイン, Gaichi Daijin Yogoshutain) was one of the Gaiark Clan's pollution ministers who fought the Go-ongers before he was killed by Go-on Red while attempting to avenge his fallen vice minister Hiramechimedes. As of the crossover film Samurai Sentai Shinkenger vs. Go-onger: GinmakuBang!!, Yogostein and his fellow pollution ministers ended up in the Sanzu River before the Gaiark's new leader, Batcheed, resurrects them to assist in his plans, though they choose not to and return to the Sanzu River instead.

As of the film Kaizoku Sentai Gokaiger vs. Space Sheriff Gavan: The Movie, Yogostein and his fellow ministers were imprisoned in the Zangyack Empire's Makuu Prison before the Gokaigers free them and the other inmates.

Yogostein is voiced by Kiyoyuki Yanada, who reprises his role from Engine Sentai Go-onger.

=== Kitaneydas ===
Air Pollution Minister Kitaneydas (害気大臣キタネイダス, Gaiki Daijin Kitaneidasu) was one of the Gaiark Clan's pollution ministers who fought the Go-ongers. After being mistreated by his leader Yogoshimacritein, he and his fellow pollution minister Kegalesia weaken him before Yogoshimacritein scraps them for their betrayal. As of the film Samurai Sentai Shinkenger vs. Go-onger: GinmakuBang!!, Kitaneydas and his fellow pollution ministers ended up in the Sanzu River before the Gaiark's new leader, Batcheed, resurrects them to assist in his plans, though they choose not to and return to the Sanzu River instead.

As of the film Kaizoku Sentai Gokaiger vs. Space Sheriff Gavan: The Movie, Kitaneydas and his fellow ministers were imprisoned in the Zangyack Empire's Makuu Prison before the Gokaigers free them and the other inmates.

Kitaneydas is voiced by Mitsuaki Madono (真殿 光昭, Madono Mitsuaki), who reprises his role from Engine Sentai Go-onger.

=== Vanculia ===
Phantom Spy Vanculia (妖幻密使バンキュリア, Yōgen Misshi Bankyuria) was the self-proclaimed "Queen of the Vampires" and an immortal spy for the Infershia Empire who fought the Magirangers. After forming a bond with Hades Goddess Sphinx and seeing her killed by her fellow Hades Gods however, Vanculia revived Sphinx, helped the Magirangers defeat the Infershian emperor, N Ma, and joined Sphinx in reforming Infershia.

As of the crossover film Kaizoku Sentai Gokaiger vs. Space Sheriff Gavan: The Movie, Vanculia was imprisoned in the Zangyack Empire's Makuu Prison before the Gokaigers free her and the other inmates.

Vanculia is voiced by Misa Watanabe (渡辺 美佐, Watanabe Misa), who reprises her role from Mahō Sentai Magiranger.
