= Kihachirō =

- Gender: Male

Origin
- Origin: Japanese
- Meaning: Different meanings depending on the kanji used

Kihachirō (written: 喜八郎) is a masculine Japanese given name. Notable people with the name include:

- Kihachirō Kawamoto (川本 喜八郎; 1925–2010), Japanese puppet designer and animator
- Okura Kihachiro (大倉 喜八郎; 1837–1928), Japanese businessman
- Kihachirō Uemura (植村 喜八郎; born 1964), Japanese voice actor
