= Kazuko Miyata =

Japanese actress (born 1969)

- 宮田 かずこ
- Born: February 14, 1969 (age 57); Ibaraki Prefecture, Japan
- Occupation: Actress
- Years active: 1988 - 1994

Kazuko Miyata (宮田 かずこ, Miyata Kazuko; born February 14, 1969, in Ibaraki Prefecture, Japan) is a Japanese actress. She graduated from Ibaraki Christian University Junior College.

== Filmography ==
=== TV series ===
Year	Title	Role	Network	Other notes
1990	Chikyu Sentai Fiveman	Kazumi Hoshikawa / Five Pink	TV Asahi	

=== Films ===
Year	Title	Role	Other notes
1989	Who Do I Choose?		
1994	Nostradamus: The Prophecy		
