= Ryo Narushima =

Japanese actress (born 1971)

- 成嶋 涼
- Born: Keiko Hayase (早瀬 恵子, Hayase Keiko); June 3, 1971 (age 54); Kyoto Prefecture, Japan
- Other names: Megumi Sakita (咲田 めぐみ, Sakita Megumi) (former stage name)
- Occupation: Actress
- Years active: 1989 - present
- Spouse: Ryouhei Kobayashi (ex-husband)

Ryo Narushima (成嶋 涼, Narushima Ryō; born June 3, 1971, in Kyoto Prefecture, Japan) is a Japanese actress.

== Filmography ==
=== TV series ===
Year	Title	Role	Network	Other notes
1989	Kousoku Sentai Turboranger	Mika Yamaguchi	TV Asahi	Episode 37
1990	Chikyu Sentai Fiveman	Remi Hoshikawa / Five Yellow	TV Asahi	
1992	Special Rescue Exceedraft	Mayumi Nanjo	TV Asahi	
1994	Ninja Sentai Kakuranger	Sakura	TV Asahi	
2012	Kaizoku Sentai Gokaiger	Remi Hoshikawa	TV Asahi	Episodes 49 and 51

=== Films ===
Year	Title	Role	Other notes
1990	Spirit Warrior	Ama Ringetsu	
2012	Kamen Rider Fourze the Movie: Space, Here We Come!	Female Executive Member of Foundation X	
