= Chikyu Sentai Fiveman =

1990–91 Japanese television series

- Title screen
- Genre: Tokusatsu; Action adventure Superhero fiction Science fantasy
- Created by: Toei
- Developed by: Hirohisa Soda
- Directed by: Takao Nagaishi; Masao Minowa; Kiyoshi Arai; Shohei Tojo
- Starring: Toshiya Fuji; Kei Shindachiya; Ryouhei Kobayashi; Kazuko Miyata; Keiko Hayase; Chika Matsui; Takeshi Ishikawa; Shunsaku Kudo; Hatsue Nishi; Motoko Watanabe; Kihachiro Uemura
- Voices of: Rica Matsumoto; Seizō Katō
- Narrated by: Eiichi Onoda
- Opening theme: "Chikyu Sentai Fiveman" by Kenji Suzuki
- Ending theme: "Fiveman, Theme of Love" by Kenji Suzuki
- Composer: Akihiko Yoshida
- Country of origin: Japan
- No. of episodes: 48 (list of episodes)

Production
- Producers: Takeyuki Suzuki; Kyōzō Utsunomiya
- Running time: 20 minutes

Original release
- Network: TV Asahi
- Release: March 2, 1990 – February 8, 1991

Related
- Kousoku Sentai Turboranger; Chōjin Sentai Jetman

Chikyu Sentai Fiveman (地球戦隊ファイブマン, Chikyū Sentai Faibuman; Earth Squadron Fiveman) is a Japanese television tokusatsu series broadcast by TV Asahi. The series is the 14th installment of Super Sentai. Directed by Takao Nagaishi, Masao Minowa, Kiyoshi Arai and Shohei Tojo, it stars Toshiya Fuji, Kei Shindachiya, Ryouhei Kobayashi, Kazuko Miyata, Keiko Hayase, Chika Matsui, Takeshi Ishikawa, Shunsaku Kudo, Hatsue Nishi, Motoko Watanabe and Kihachiro Uemura. It aired from March 2, 1990 to February 8, 1991, replacing Kousoku Sentai Turboranger and was replaced by Chōjin Sentai Jetman. The names given by Toei for international distribution are Fiveman or Sky Rangers.

It was released by Shout! Factory on Region 1 DVD on September 6, 2022, as part of Shout! Factory's new partnership with Hasbro. It originally was teased to be released in 2019. This is the second Super Sentai series to be officially released in North America that does not have a Power Rangers counterpart. The first one released was Chōjin Sentai Jetman, which was the series that came out the year following Fiveman. Jetman was released in the region on September 25, 2018.

== Plot ==
In 1970, Doctor Hoshikawa was researching how to transform the planet Sedon into a green, lush world, testing it by attempting to grow flowers. On the day the first flower bloomed, the Zone Empire launched an assault on the planet. Before separating him and his wife from their five children, Arthur G6 took Doctor Hoshikawa, his wife and their five children back to Earth after Zone destroyed the Planet P16 Milky Way.

Twenty years later, the five are now teachers at the same school, the Newtown Elementary School (Newtown Shougakko). The Galactic Imperial Army Zone led by Empress Meadow and Captain Garoa now prepares to invade Earth as its thousandth target to destroy for immortality of Empress Meadow (it was later revealed that Empress Meadow is an illusion used by Vulgyre, their base which is also a gigantic lifeform monster to manipulate them to be a "god"). As they begin the attack, three vehicles appear and counter the offensive. Five warriors descend from the vehicles and confront Zone.

The Hoshikawa siblings stay on earth with their parents while they develop the Fiveman technology. The siblings train hard in the event Zone invades Earth. Through their training the five siblings become ready to battle togwther with foes as Fiveman.

== Characters ==
=== Fivemen ===
The Fivemen transformed. From left to right: Gaku, Ken, Fumiya, Kazumi, and Remi Hoshikawa.

The five siblings of the Hoshikawa family (星川家, Hoshikawa-ke), which consist of three brothers and two sisters, were separated from their parents during a sudden Zone attack, sent to board a ship along with Arthur G6 to be raised and learn of the Fiveman technology. They pose as teachers at New Town School, planting a garden of Sidon Flowers which they brought from planet Sidon.

- Gaku Hoshikawa (星川 学, Hoshikawa Gaku)/Five Red (ファイブレッド, Faibu Reddo): (William/Manabu in Philippine dub) The first born and leader of the team at 27 years old. He is a Science teacher (Episodes 1, 16, and 38) skilled in kendo (Episode 40). He was 7 at the time of Zone's attack on Sidon. Calm, responsible and a strict teacher (Episode 40), he had the task of raising his four younger siblings along with Arthur G6, making him not just a big brother but also a leader and a parental figure. Out of fear, he fired a gun at Garoa's face, scarring him, creating a rivalry between the two. Even though he is a reliable and brave leader, he has a major weakness in the supernatural (Episode 41).
  - His helmet has the science symbol (an atom) on the front, and the triangle-shaped visor having no stripes indicates him as the first member.
  - Weapons: V Sword (Vソード, Bui Sōdo), V Shuttler (Vシャトラー, Bui Shatorā)
  - Attacks: V Sword Spark (Vソードスパーク, Bui Sōdo Supāku)
- Ken Hoshikawa (星川 健, Hoshikawa Ken)/Five Blue (ファイブブルー, Faibu Burū): (Ben in Philippine dub) The second born and second-in-command of the team at 25 years old. He is a Physical education teacher skilled in judo. Although reckless (Episodes 2 and 44), he is extremely passionate in everything he does, relies more on body combat than in weapons (Episodes 20 and 38). He even taught one of his students the meaning of courage by defeating a foe without transforming (Episode 20). He can also lift heavy objects, even monsters while fighting.
  - His helmet has a P.E. symbol (loosely derived from the swimming symbol) on the front, and the white horizontal stripe splitting the diamond-shaped visor into two parts indicates him as the second member.
  - Weapons: Twin Arrays (ツインアレイ, Tsuin Arei), Twin Risbees (ツインリスビー, Tsuin Risubī), Twin Yo-yos (ツインヨーヨー, Tsuin Yōyō)
  - Attacks: Rolling Arrays (ローリングアレイ, Rōringu Arei)
- Fumiya Hoshikawa (星川 文矢, Hoshikawa Fumiya)/Five Black (ファイブブラック, Faibu Burakku): (Julio/Fumio in Philippine dub) The fifth born, youngest son, and younger twin brother of Remi at 20 years old. He is a Japanese teacher skilled in karate (Episode 39). He has a wide range of knowledge on various languages, even alien ones. He can read alien languages (Episode 31) and speak and understand alien languages (Episodes 2, 5 and 7) Despite this, he tends to be childish and reckless like Ken (Episodes 2 and 32) and sometimes ill-tempered(Episodes 14, 32, 36 and 38) and clumsy (Episode 26, 36 and 43). He is thoughtful (Episodes 14 and 16) and good in spy-warfare (Episodes 23 and 38), stunts and sometimes fights without transforming (Episodes 10, 16, 23, 38, and 43). In episode 43, he teaches Yoshio-Kun the meaning of having playmates. He and Remi were only 1 year old during the attack on Sidon, therefore they continuously suffer for not being able to remember their parent's faces.
  - His helmet has 語 (Go) (the kanji for "language") on the front, and two white diagonal stripes forming a "V" and splitting the half-circle-shaped visor into three parts indicates him as the third member.
  - Weapons: Power Cutter (パワーカッター, Pawā Kattā), Black Jaw (ブラックジョー, Burakku Jō), Cutter Discs (カッターディスク, Kattā Disuku)
  - Attacks: Screw Cutter (スクリューカッター, Sukuryū Kattā)
- Kazumi Hoshikawa (星川 数美, Hoshikawa Kazumi)/Five Pink (ファイブピンク, Faibu Pinku): (Rita in Philippine dub) The third born and eldest daughter at 23 years old. She is a Math teacher skilled in fencing. Sometimes tagged as "Old maid" (Episodes 16 and 41). Calm and intelligent, she can analyze and calculate with her "computer like" brain. She was three years old at the time of the attack on Sidon and remembers nothing but fear which she had to overcome to do battle with Zone as an adult. Protective and caring, she is a maternal figure to Fumiya and Remi (Episodes 5 and 17). She may be considered as strict (Episodes 7, 18, and 42) but practical (Episode 42), willing to sacrifice (Episodes 18 and 32) and in charge of their household on Magma Base with Arthur G6 (Episodes 7, 10, and 42).
  - Her helmet has a unique math symbol (a combination of the addition, subtraction, multiplication, and division symbols) on the front, and three white horizontal stripes splitting the heart-shaped visor into four parts indicates her as the fourth member.
  - Weapons: Cutie Circle (キューティーサークル, Kyūtī Sākuru), Circle Puter (サークルピュータ, Sākuru Pyūta)
  - Attacks: Circle Finish (サークルフィニッシュ, Sākuru Finisshu)
- Remi Hoshikawa (星川 レミ, Hoshikawa Remi)/Five Yellow (ファイブイエロー, Faibu Ierō): (Jessica in Philippine dub) The fourth born, youngest daughter, and older twin sister of Fumiya at 20 years old. A music teacher skilled in kung fu. She is disastrous at housekeeping and cleaning tasks which she leaves to either Kazumi or Arthur (Episode 42). She has excellent rhythm and musical senses (Episodes 1 and 13), she is also a rhythmic gymnast and dancer (Episode 34) which she applies to her fighting. She teaches children kung-fu in her spare time. In episode 4, she got drunk when water was turned into alcohol, yet she fought using the Drunken Fist and defeated the galactic warrior. During the events of Kaizoku Sentai Gokaiger, she appeared and granted the Greater Power of the Fiveman to the Gokaigers. She would appear in the final episode of the series receiving the Five Yellow Ranger Key as the Gokaigers depart Earth.
  - Her helmet has a single eighth note on the front, and four white horizontal stripes splitting the pentagon-shaped visor into five parts indicates her as the fifth member.
  - Weapons: Melody Tact (メロディータクト, Merodī Takuto), Yellow Flute (イエローフルート, Ierō Furūto)
  - Attacks: Tact Attack (タクトアタック, Takuto Atakku)

=== Allies ===
- Arthur G6 (アーサーＧ６, Āsā Jī Shikkusu): A support robot created by Doctor Hoshikawa, Arthur was the one who raised the orphaned children on Earth, becoming the closest thing they had to their parents. He usually aids Fiveman from the Magma Base but at times he can fly out from base and transform into Earth Cannon.
- Gunther (グンサー, Gunsā): Known as "Raging Wolf of the Galaxy" (宇宙の暴れウルフ, Uchū no Abare Urufu), Gunther was cared for by Doctor Hoshikawa and his wife when severely injured before he stole the Star Carrier. But arriving on Earth, Gunther battled the Fivemen but eventually could make friends with Gaku before he returns the Star Carrier to them and then was turned to stone. However, he was but was unintentionally revived by Iwakasekigin's spell and helps Gaku while he is trapped with Vulgyre. He sacrifices himself to save Gaku from Billion, and reveals in his dying breath his sins and receive forgiveness before he dies.
- Five-kun Dolls (ファイブくん人形, Faibu-kun Ningyō): These plush dolls first appeared in episode 23, from a parallel dimension. The five members are Red-kun, Blue-kun, Black-kun, Pink-chan, and Yellow-chan. While watching TV, Fivemen must assist the plush dolls. The enemy of the dolls is Garoa-don Doll (ガロアどん人形, Garoa-don Ningyō). They made a few more cameos in the series, watching certain scenes in the episodes and expressing their thoughts of it.

=== Silver Imperial Army Zone ===
The Silver Imperial Unit Zone (銀帝軍ゾーン, Ginteigun Zōn) is an alien army plotting to rule the entire Milky Way. They fly across the universe attacking worlds with their Galactic Warriors. Earth will be their 1,000th destroyed planet, at which point Meadow will gain eternal life. They operate from their ship Vulgyre and can send smaller battleships called Vulgols (バルゴール, Barugōru). They use the Galactic currency Dolyen (combination of dollar and Yen) which is said to be equal to 100 Japanese yens.

- Galactic Super Beast Vulgyre (銀河超獣バルガイヤー, Ginga Chōjū Barugaiyā): The true ruler of Zone. Even though being a living organism, he operated as the Zone headquarters called Galactic Ship Vulgyre (銀河戦艦バルガイヤー, Ginga Senkan Barugaiyā). Projecting into the sky the face of a dead alien woman named Meadow, who he was in love with and killed for refusing him, Vulgyre gave orders to Zone under the "Ōkubi" persona of Empress Meadow. Vulgyre had been traveling the galaxy to destroy a total of 1,000 stars. When the star number 1000 is destroyed, he would obtain eternal life and become "God" of the Milky Way. When Five Red exposed the truth, Vulgyre goes on the offensive on the city until he is exposed to New Town School's Sidon flowers and crashes into the mountainside where he confirms his identity. From there, Vulgyre forcefully combines Doldora and Zaza to destroy the Earth-grown Sidon flowers. Believing the one thing that can kill him is gone, Vulgyre reveals to the rest of Zone that he would be undergoing his "Galactic Eclosion", in which he would become "Super Galactic Beast" and that he needed a "final energy" to complete this. It is first thought that it is the deaths of the Fivemen but the truth was uncovered after Five Red defeated Chevalier: Vulgyre coveted the energy of Chevalier's death, and not Fiveman's, in order to begin his metamorphosis, explaining that Chevalier had committed multiple murders across the galaxy and his soul would be full with the blood of his victims, the source of the "last energy", resulting in the disturbing revelation that he had deceived Chevalier from the very beginning. After hatching, destroyed the Magma Base with remarkable ease. The Sidon Flowers are his weakness as they are the first sprout of new life in the very first planet he destroyed, using them the Fivemen weakened him and was ultimately destroyed by the Super Five Robo in the finale.
  - Galactic Empress Meadow (銀河皇帝メドー, Ginga Kōtei Medō): The white-skinned, silver-maned, purple-lipped, golden-eyed mystery ruler of the Zone Empire. She is only seen to be the face of a woman surrounded by a silver mane that appears from the sky. Extremely powerful. She seeks to devour life from planets and when the 1,000th is destroyed, she will gain eternal life. Later on, she appeared in reddish form, far more angry after continuous failure of Zone. She is revealed to be a simulation created by Vulgyre after the flowers of Sidon destroyed her. The real Meadow was an alien woman Vulgyre wanted to be his queen in galactic conquest but refused. In the end, her spirit helped the Sidon flowers destroy Vulgyre once and for all avenging herself for all the wrongs Vulgyre did in her name.
- Captain Garoa (ガロア艦長, Garoa-kanchō): The captain of Vulgyre in black and gray armor over red clothes, armed with a sword. He got scarred by Five Red as a child creating a rivalry between them. An expert swordsman, could handle even the five siblings by himself in battle, with his special technique "Taifuu Shaken" (Typhoon Spinning Sword). Although a field commander, he would not show up much in fight, giving orders from Meadow (actually Vulgyre) to the others but at times shows up to make the lives of the Fivemen miserable if the missions are failing. The continuing failures and the arrival of Chevalier eventually caused Garoa's dismissal, having been assigned the janitor post after his monster Goriwashigin was destroyed when he promised "Meadow" (Vulgyre) the deaths of the Fivemen. He eventually found a secret energy source in Vulgyre, and, unaware of its true nature, he used it on a Gorlin, creating the "Big Garoa", a powerful robotic monster which temporarily destroyed the Super Five Robo, earning him the Captain position back. Even though he tried the hardest to succeed in his plans and, along Dongoros, was the last survivor of Zone, Garoa found his demise trapped in the coffin of Meadow, with his armor destroyed, in the middle of burning Dolyen bills as Vulgyre exploded in the series finale.
- First Captain Chevalier (初代艦長シュバリエ, Shodai Kanchō Shubarie): He is actually Vulgyre's first captain but ironically younger-looking than Garoa suggesting he might be a gifted child himself. He had been gone and was operating alone when he heard of Zone's struggle in Earth and returned much to Garoa's chagrin. Eventually takes over captaincy after Galois, becoming Five Red's rival. He controls a black Gorlin. This self-proclaimed "Hero of the Galaxy" enjoys music and has sword abilities that surpass even those of Garoa's. When he first appeared, he sang the 1970s song "Hero" by the Kai Band. Chevalier shows up in battle more often than Garoa. He is scheming and sadistic as well as cool and even humorous. He uses extremely dangerous tactics against the Fivemen and makes their lives twice as miserable. In the finale, he challenges Five Red to a "Chain Deathmatch" in which an unbreakable chain would link them together until one of them died. He lost to Five Red and then Vulgyre revealed that he made Chevalier fight to death because he needed the "Energy of the most powerful death in the Galaxy" and deceived Chevalier in thinking it was Fiveman's deaths when it was really his that was needed. His explosion released the final energy for Vulgyre's final transformation.
  - Weapons: Barok Stick, Barok Fencer, Barok Shoot, Barok Byoot
- Batsuler Soldiers (バツラー兵, Batsurā-hei): The black-skinned grunts with orange heads, armed with crab claws, bearing the Zone crest on their chests. They are also capable of disguise. The Batsuler Soldiers' name comes from the "batsu" (cross) on their heads. There was a special Batsuler known as Number 339 who had a turtle-like shell. In episode 26 the group became Superior Over Galois and the Triumvirate During Topsy-Turvy Day. The group were later summoned by Zaigan during Super Sentai World.
- Enlarging Beast Gorlin (巨大化獣ゴルリン, Kyodaikajū Gorurin): A giant white-skinned robot alien which absorbs and mimics the defeated Galactic Warriors. If the Galactic Warrior had completely died though, the Gorlin would not be able to mimic it. Each Gorlin has a serial number and there have been some interesting cases: Gorlin number 13 combined itself with the Sidon demon wrapped around it instead of absorbing it; Gorlin number 12 fell down while running and could not reach Bat-rugin before he died, failing to enlarge him; Gorlin number 36 was used by Galois to create the giant robot Big Garoa. Each Gorlin costs 100,000 Dolyen, considerably cheap given its dimensions. It resembled Michelin's mascot Bibendum a little bit.
  - Black Gorlin (黒ゴルリン, Kuro Gorurin): A special Gorlin Chevalier had modified to serve him as a fighting robot. It has laser cannons on its shoulders and bears the Zone crest on its chest. It was destroyed before the finale by two consecutive Super Vector Punches from the Super Five Robo at the same time that Chevalier fell against Five Red.

==== Galactic Commanders ====
The Galactic Commanders are somewhat the triumvirate of the Empire only answering to Galois and later to Chevalier. They are the ones who serve as the field commanders of the Zone Empire.

- Galactic Swordsman Billion (銀河剣士ビリオン, Ginga Kenshi Birion): He was probably the best swordsman in the galaxy, white-maned in white armor over blue tights. A lover of liquor and swords, this sadistic left-handed warrior enjoys fighting. When he finds an even minimally weaker foe, he challenges to battle and defeats him. He is bitter rivals with Five Red. He would not hesitate to execute a plan even at the cost of a comrade's welfare. He is scheming and manipulative, most of the time using others to accomplish his goals. This can be seen in the different types of monsters and strategies he chose in contrast to Doldora and Dongoros. While using Sabergin, Billion evolved into the more powerful Saber Billion (サーベルビリオン, Sāberu Birion), able to enlarge himself to fight the Five Robo. However, once his weapon was destroyed, Billion returned to normal. After being witness to Rose Dolgin's creation to his disgust of the recent truth, Billion attempts to kill Gaku when Gunther intervene and died as a result. He then battles Five Red one on one in a final duel, shattering his sake bottle and discarding his cape, before he ultimately killed by Five Red in Armor Mode's flying sword thrust attack causing him to explode after he got close to victory.
- Galactic Doctor Doldora (銀河博士ドルドラ, Ginga Hakase Dorudora): Scientist and weapons researcher of Zone in gold scorpion-like armor over black tights, she is more of a strategist, although she also has high combat levels. Having a gift for disguise as well, she even fooled Fumiya once posing as a cute girl. She is much less violent than Billion and Dongoros but no less evil. She prefers to let Zaza, her underling, do most of her dirty work, and uses subtle tactics and deceitful monsters as she believes brains work better than direct force. After knowing Vulgyre's true identity and going into insanity, Doldora was forcefully united with Zaza by him as well some of Vulgyre's energies to become the scorpion/rose Combined Galactic Warrior Bara Dolgin (バラドルギン, Baradorugin) to destroy the Sidon flowers in the New Town School by converting them into red roses with Five Black, Blue, Yellow and Pink powerless to stop her. With only one remaining, she goes after Tatsuya as he runs off with it. But Gaku arrives to stop her with Gunther's aid. She battles the other siblings until Billion is killed and a Gorlin absorbs her. Piloting Star Five, the Fivemen manage to kill Bara Dolgin.
  - Galactic Fang Zaza (銀河の牙ザザ, Ginga no Kiba Zaza): Doldora's underling and loyal bodyguard in black tights with purple armor, born from an egg. Zaza was turned into a cyborg by Doldora when just born and swore absolute servitude to her. She used to operate along Billion at times. She is rivals with Remi. She does most of Doldora's dirty work and does not question her mistress at all. Attempting to shield Doldora from Vulgyre, she was merged with her mistress.
- Galactic Merchant Dongoros (銀河商人ドンゴロス, Ginga Shōnin Dongorosu): A grotesque, short, fat space merchant who enjoys making money (Dolyen bills) and carries an abacus. He prefers to use brute force (which can be seen in his choice of monsters) to accomplish the job but at times he would use subtle tactics as well when necessary like using a Voodoo Monster. In the finale, Dongoros was killed in the explosion of Vulgyre as he was desperately packing all the Dolyens and gold bars he could before fleeing, falling as a victim of his own greed.

==== Ginga Sentai Gingaman ====
The Ginga Sentai Gingaman (銀河戦隊ギンガマン, Ginga Sentai Gingaman; Galaxy Squadron Gingaman) are a comedic all male evil Squadron of five aliens who were first formed by Doldora as part of her plan to hypnotize the masses. But they would later return to serve Chevalier. They were killed by the Fivemen near the finale. Not to be confused with 1998's Super Sentai series Seijuu Sentai Gingaman.

- Baikanian Ginga Red (バイカン星人ギンガレッド, Baikan Seijin Ginga Reddo): A member of Ginga Sentai Gingaman from the planet Baikan.
- Monomenian Ginga Blue (モノメ星人ギンガブルー, Monome Seijin Ginga Burū): A one-eyed member of Ginga Sentai Gingaman from the planet Monome.
- Grachisian Ginga Black (グラチス星人ギンガブラック, Gurachisu Seijin Ginga Burakku): A member of Ginga Sentai Gingaman from the planet Grachis who wields a crab-like claw mounted on his right arm.
- Fujiminian Ginga Pink (フジミン星人ギンガピンク, Fujimin Seijin Ginga Pinku): A member of Ginga Sentai Gingaman from the planet Fujimin.
- Gringanian Ginga Yellow (グリンガ星人ギンガイエロー, Guringa Seijin Ginga Ierō): A member of Ginga Sentai Gingaman from the planet Gringa.

==== Galactic Warriors ====
The Galactic Warriors (銀河闘士, Ginga Tōshi) are alien monsters with the appearances of Earth animals that are used by the Silver Zone Imperial Army in their plans.

- Gamerugin (ガメルギン, Gamerugin): A turtle/dragon Galactic Warrior.
- Torarugin (トラルギン, Torarugin): A tiger Galactic Warrior that used to be the partner of Galactic Swordsman Billion.
- Zourugin (ゾウルギン, Zōrugin): An elephant Galactic Warrior.
- Condorugin (コンドルギン, Kondorugin): A condor Galactic Warrior.
- Sairagin (サイラギン, Sairagin): A young rhinoceros Galactic Warrior from the planet Saira.
- Okamirugin (オオカミルギン, Ōkamirugin): A wolf Galactic Warrior.
- Gagaagin (ガガーギン, Gagāgin): A moth Galactic Warrior.
- Kabutogin (カブトギン, Kabutogin): A rhinoceros beetle Galactic Warrior created by Galactic Doctor Doldora.
- Mogurarugin (モグラルギン, Mogurarugin): A mole Galactic Warrior.
- Denkiunagin (デンキウナギン, Denkiunagin): An electric eel Galactic Warrior.
- Todorugin (トドルギン, Todorugin): A sea lion Galactic Warrior.
- Koumorugin (コウモルギン, Kōmorugin): A bat Galactic Warrior.
- Gokiraagin (ゴキラーギン, Gokirāgin): A cockroach Galactic Warrior.
- Kumorugin (クモルギン, Kumorugin): A spider Galactic Warrior.
- Butarugin (ブタルギン, Butarugin): A pig Galactic Warrior.
- Amoebarugin (アメーバルギン, Amēbarugin): An amoeba Galactic Warrior.
- Liogin (ライオギン, Raiogin): A lion Galactic Warrior that used to be a performer in the Galactic Circus. He was used by the Silver Zone Imperial Army in their plot after they destroyed some planets that the Galactic Circus was supposed to perform at. With help from Liogin's partner Jeeg, the Fivemen persuade Liogin not to work for the Silver Imperial Zone Army. Liogin rejoined Jeeg in the Galactic Circus.
- Koganegin (コガネギン, Koganegin): A scarab beetle Galactic Warrior.
- Kamakiraagin (カマキラーギン, Kamakirāgin): A mantis Galactic Warrior created by Galactic Doctor Doldora.
- Kourogin (コオロギン, Kōrogin): A cricket Galactic Warrior.
- Kanigin (カニギン, Kanigin): A crab Galactic Warrior. It was later used in an experiment with the Franken-Capsule where it was fused with Arigin to form Kaniarigin.
- Arigin (アリギン, Arigin): An ant Galactic Warrior. It was later used in an experiment with the Franken-Capsule where it was fused wit Kanigin to form Kaniarigin.
- Iwakasekigin (イワカセキギン, Iwakasekigin): A rock/fossil Galactic Warrior created by First Captain Chevalier.

===== Combined Galactic Warriors =====
The Combined Galactic Warriors (合身銀河闘士, Gasshin Ginga Tōshi) are a type of Galactic Warrior that are created when Captain Garoa uses the Franken-Capsule on two Galactic Warriors to create a fusion of them where each side of them corresponds to the respectful Galactic Warrior.

- Kaniarigin (カニアリギン, Kaniarigin): A crab/ant Combined Galactic Warrior who was created by Captain Garao who used the Franken-Capsule to fuse Kanigin and Arigin. Kanigan makes up Kaniarigin's left half while Arigin makes up Kaniarigin's right half.
- Ikatamagin (イカタマギン, Ikatamagin): A squid/egg Combined Galactic Warrior who was created by First Captain Chevalier who used the Franken-Capsule to fuse the squid Galactic Warrior Ikagin (イカギン, Ikagin) and the egg Galactic Warrior Tamagogin (タマゴギン, Tamagogin). Ikagin makes up the Ikatamagin's left half while Tamagogin makes up Ikatamagin's right half.
- Tanukitsunegin (タヌキツネギン, Tanukitsunegin): A raccoon dog/fox Combined Galactic Warrior who was created when the Franken-Capsule was used to fuse the raccoon dog Galactic Warrior Tanukigin (タヌキギン, Tanukigin) and the fox Galactic Warrior Kitsunegin (キツネギン, Kitsunegin). Tanukigin makes up Tanukitsunegin's righ side while Kitsunegin makes up Tanukitsunegin's left side.
- Wanikaerugin (ワニカエルギン, Wanikaerugin): A crocodile/frog Combined Galactic Warrior who was created by First Captain Chevalier who used the Franken-Capsule to fuse the crocodile Galactic Warrior Wanigin (ワニギン, Wanigin) and the frog Galactic warrior Kaerugin (カエルギン, Kaerugin). Wanigin makes up Wanikaerugin's left half while Kaerugin makes up Wanikaerugin's right half.
- Goriwashigan (ゴリワシギン, Goriwashigin): A gorilla/eagle Combined Galactic Warrior who was created by Captain Garao who used the Franken-Capsule to fuse the gorilla Galactic Warrior Gorillagin (ゴリラギン, Goriragin) and the eagle Galactic Warrior Washigin (ワシギン, Washigin) out of desperation that Galactic Empress Meadow would give his position to First Knight Chevalier. Because he did not use the assistance of Galactic Doctor Doldora, this monster resembles both Galactic Warriors fused to the back of each other leaving them with competing minds.
- Samejigokugin (サメジゴクギン, Samejigokugin): A shark/antlion Combined Galactic Warrior who was created by First Captain Chevalier who used the Franken-Capsule to fuse the shark Galactic Warrior Samejigin (サメジギン, Samejigin) and the antlion Galactic Warrior Arijigokugin (アリジゴクギン, Arijigokugin). Samejigokugin has Samejigin's back, upper head, and right limbs and Arijogokugin's front, chest head, and left limbs.
- Hyoukobrarugin (ヒョウコブラルギン, Hyōkoburarugin): A leopard/cobra Combined Galactic Warrior who was created when the Franken-Capsule was used on the leopard Galactic Warrior Hyougin (ヒョギン, Hyōgin) and the cobra Galactic Warrior Cobrarugin (コブラギン, Koburarugin). Hyogin makes up Hyoukobrarugin's left half while Cobrarugin makes up Hyoukobrarugin's right half.
- Sasorinamazugin (サソリナマズギン, Sasorinamazugin): A scorpion/electric catfish Combined Galactic Warrior who was created when the Franken-Capsule was used on the scorpion Galactic Warrior Sasorigin (サソリギン, Sasorigin) and the electric catfish Galactic Warrior Namazugin (ナマズギン, Namazugin). Sasorigin makes up Sasorinamuzugin's right half while Namazugin makes up Sasorinamuzugin's left half.
- Sazaemadillogin (サザエマジロギン, Sazaemajirogin): A turban snail/armadillo Combined Galactic Warrior who was created by Galactic Doctor Doldora who used the Franken-Capsule to fuse the turban snail Galactic Warrior Sazaegin (サザエ, Sazaegin) and the armadillo Galactic Warrior Armadillogin (アルマジロ, Arumajirogin). Sazaegin makes up Sazaemadillogin's left half and Armadillogin makes up Sazaemadillogin's right half.
- Chamelezarugin (カメレザルギン, Kamerezarugin): A chameleon/monkey Combined Galactic warrior who was created when the Franken-Caspule was used on the chameleon Galactic Warrior Chamelegin (カメレギン, Kameregin) and the monkey Galactic Warrior Zarugin (ザルギン, Zarugin). Chamelegin makes up Chamelezarugin's left half while Zarugin makes up Chamelezarugin's right half. In addition to making use of the human disguises and becoming invisible, Chamelezarugin can summon the ghosts of past Galactic Warriors like Butarugin, Enokiraagin, Mogurarugin, Okamirugin, and Kaijurugin.
- Hiruagehagin (ヒルアゲハギン, Hiruagehagin): A leech/swallowtail butterfly Combined Galactic Warrior who was created by First Captain Chevalier who used the Franken-Capsule to fuse the leech Galactic Warrior Hirugin (ヒルギン, Hirugin) and the swallowtail butterfly Galactic Warrior Agehagin (アゲハギン, Agehagin). Hirugen makes up Hiruagehagin's right half and Agehagin makes up Hiruagehagin's left half.
- PteranoTelevigin (テラノTVギン, Teranoterebigin): A Pteranodon/television Combined Galactic Warrior who was created by Galactic Merchant Dongoros who used the Franken-Capsule to merge an unnamed Pteranodon Galactic Warrior and a television giving it the appearance of a Pteranodon monster with a television on its chest and a television dish at the tip of its crest.

==== Others ====
The following are not in the categories above:

- Enokiraagin (エノキラーギン, Enokirāgin) is a Galactic Warrior created by Galactic Doctor Doldora who fused an Experimental Alien with a mushroom.
- Galaxy Plant Sidon Demon (銀河植物シドンデモン, Ginga Shokubutsu Shidon Demon) is a Galactic Warrior created by Galactic Empress Meadow from a crushed Sidon Flower.
- Barrugin (バールギン, Bārugin): A Baal-themed Galactic Wizard that allied with the Silver Imperial Zone Army.
- Wandering Swordsman Queen Killer (放浪剣士クイーンキラー, Hōrō Kenshi Kuīn Kirā): A bee-themed swordswoman who is summoned to Earth by Galactic Empress Meadow.
- Kaijurugin (カイジュルギン): A faceless alien from the planet Nopperi that can fuse with a plush toy of a kaiju.
- Galactic Ninja Batsulergin (銀河忍者バツラギン, Ginga Ninja Batsuragin): A ninja-like alien who is summoned by the Silver Imperial Zone Army to improve the Batsuler Soldiers.
- Galactic Beast Anmonaiton (銀河獣アンモナイトン, Gingajū Anmonaiton): An Ammonite-like alien with a head on its right tendril that was previously used by First Captain Chevalier in his earlier campaigns.
- Mirian Solar (ミリア星人ソーラ, Miria Seijin Sōra): A warrior from the planet Miria who helped the Silver Zone Imperial Army due to her developing a crush on Galactic Swordsman Billion. She would later take pills that would turn her into Dark Solar where the green one has her temporarily transforming into Dark Solar and the red pill would permanently transform her until she gets killed. Solar is killed by Galactic Swordsman Billions and she dies in the Fivemen's presence.
- Galactic Demon Sword Saberugin (銀河魔神剣サーベルギン, Ginga Majinken Sāberugin): A demonic sword that Galactic Swordsman Billion summoned to Earth. Anyone who wields it will become possessed and only be interested in battling.

== Episodes ==
No.	Title	Directed by	Written by	Original release date
1	"The Five Sibling Warriors"; Transliteration: "Go Kyōdai Senshi" (Japanese: 五兄弟戦士)	Takao Nagaishi	Hirohisa Soda	March 2, 1990
2	"Father's Payback! Mother's Payback"; Transliteration: "Chichi no Kataki! Haha no Kataki" (Japanese: 父の仇! 母の仇)	Takao Nagaishi	Hirohisa Soda	March 9, 1990
3	"Challenge! The Galactic Tiger"; Transliteration: "Chōsen! Ginga no Tora" (Japanese: 挑戦! 銀河の虎)	Masao Minowa	Hirohisa Soda	March 16, 1990
4	"Get the Earth Drunk"; Transliteration: "Chikyū o Yowasero" (Japanese: 地球を酔わせろ)	Masao Minowa	Hirohisa Soda	March 23, 1990
5	"Orphaned Galaxy Egg"; Transliteration: "Minashigo Ginga Tamago" (Japanese: みなしご銀河卵)	Kiyoshi Arai	Hirohisa Soda	March 30, 1990
6	"I Hate Hard Workers"; Transliteration: "Hatarakimono wa Kirai Da" (Japanese: 働き者は嫌いだ)	Kiyoshi Arai	Mami Watanabe	April 6, 1990
7	"The 45m Grade-Schooler"; Transliteration: "Yonjūgo-mētā no Shōgakusei" (Japanese: 45ｍの小学生)	Takao Nagaishi	Hirohisa Soda	April 13, 1990
8	"Shine! A Seed of Life"; Transliteration: "Kagayake! Hitotsubu no Inochi" (Japanese: 輝け! 一粒の命)	Takao Nagaishi	Kunio Fujii	April 20, 1990
9	"Gingaman Appear"; Transliteration: "Tōjō Gingaman" (Japanese: 登場ギンガマン)	Shohei Tojo	Hirohisa Soda	April 27, 1990
10	"Suck My Blood!"; Transliteration: "Ore no Chi o Sue!" (Japanese: 俺の血を吸え!)	Shohei Tojo	Toshiki Inoue	May 4, 1990
11	"Dangerous Treasure Hunting"; Transliteration: "Abunai Takara Sagashi" (Japanese: あぶない宝探し)	Masao Minowa	Kunio Fujii	May 11, 1990
12	"Arthur's Super Transformation"; Transliteration: "Āsā Chō Henkei" (Japanese: アーサー超変型)	Masao Minowa	Hirohisa Soda	May 18, 1990
13	"Do, Re, Mi, Fight"; Transliteration: "Do Re Mi Faito" (Japanese: ドレミファイト)	Takao Nagaishi	Hirohisa Soda	May 25, 1990
14	"The Cute Liar"; Transliteration: "Kawaii Usotsuki" (Japanese: 可愛いウソつき)	Takao Nagaishi	Hirohisa Soda	June 1, 1990
15	"There Are Two Reds!!"; Transliteration: "Reddo ga Futari!!" (Japanese: レッドが二人!!)	Shohei Tojo	Hirohisa Soda	June 8, 1990
16	"Hungry Hero"; Transliteration: "Harapeko Hīrō" (Japanese: 腹ぺこヒーロー)	Shohei Tojo	Mami Watanabe	June 15, 1990
17	"Fumiya's Friendship Announcement"; Transliteration: "Fumiya no Kōsai Sengen" (Japanese: 文矢の交際宣言)	Takao Nagaishi	Kunio Fujii	June 22, 1990
18	"Saving Money!!"; Transliteration: "O-kane Tamemasu!!" (Japanese: お金貯めます!!)	Takao Nagaishi	Toshiki Inoue	June 29, 1990
19	"Red Fighting Robot"; Transliteration: "Akai Kenka Robo" (Japanese: 赤いけんかロボ)	Masao Minowa	Hirohisa Soda	July 6, 1990
20	"Burning Sibling Robot"; Transliteration: "Moeru Kyōdai Robo" (Japanese: 燃える兄弟ロボ)	Masao Minowa	Hirohisa Soda	July 13, 1990
21	"Vaulting Horse Trio"; Transliteration: "Tobibako Sannin-gumi" (Japanese: 跳び箱3人組)	Takao Nagaishi	Hirohisa Soda	July 20, 1990
22	"Shining Handsome Youth"; Transliteration: "Hikaru Biseinen" (Japanese: 光る美青年)	Takao Nagaishi	Mami Watanabe	July 27, 1990
23	"The Five-kun Dolls"; Transliteration: "Faibu Kun Ningyō" (Japanese: 5(ファイブ)くん人形)	Shohei Tojo	Hirohisa Soda	August 3, 1990
24	"Slow Turtle Ninja"; Transliteration: "Noro Kame Ninja" (Japanese: のろ亀忍者)	Shohei Tojo	Hirohisa Soda	August 10, 1990
25	"Friendship's Sakurajima"; Transliteration: "Yūjō no Sakurajima" (Japanese: 友情の桜島)	Takao Nagaishi	Hirohisa Soda	August 17, 1990
26	"It's Kyushu, Huh"; Transliteration: "Kyūshū Dayon" (Japanese: 九州だョン)	Takao Nagaishi	Hirohisa Soda	August 24, 1990
27	"If You Sleep, You Die"; Transliteration: "Nemureba Shinu" (Japanese: 眠れば死ぬ)	Shohei Tojo	Toshiki Inoue	August 31, 1990
28	"Chorus of Underworld"; Transliteration: "Jigoku no Kōrasu" (Japanese: 地獄の合唱(コーラス))	Masao Minowa	Hirohisa Soda	September 7, 1990
29	"Fusion vs. Combination"; Transliteration: "Gasshin Tai Gattai" (Japanese: 合身VS合体)	Masao Minowa	Hirohisa Soda	September 14, 1990
30	"Black Gorlin"; Transliteration: "Kuro Gorurin" (Japanese: 黒ゴルリン)	Shohei Tojo	Hirohisa Soda	September 21, 1990
31	"Dangerous Mother"; Transliteration: "Abunai Haha" (Japanese: あぶない母)	Shohei Tojo	Hirohisa Soda	September 28, 1990
32	"Gaku Dies"; Transliteration: "Gaku, Shisu" (Japanese: 学、死す)	Takao Nagaishi	Toshiki Inoue	October 5, 1990
33	"Deadly Flip-turn"; Transliteration: "Hissatsu Uragaeshi" (Japanese: 必殺裏返し)	Takao Nagaishi	Hirohisa Soda	October 12, 1990
34	"Can-Packed Humans"; Transliteration: "Ningen Kanzume" (Japanese: 人間カン詰)	Masao Minowa	Hirohisa Soda	October 19, 1990
35	"Gaku's Secret!!"; Transliteration: "Gaku no Himitsu!!" (Japanese: 学の秘密!!)	Masao Minowa	Kunio Fujii	October 26, 1990
36	"Super Twin Strategy"; Transliteration: "Futago Dai Sakusen" (Japanese: 双子大作戦)	Shohei Tojo	Mami Watanabe	November 2, 1990
37	"Human Cannon"; Transliteration: "Ningen Taihō" (Japanese: 人間大砲)	Shohei Tojo	Hirohisa Soda	November 9, 1990
38	"Fake Sibling Teachers"; Transliteration: "Nise Kyodai Sensei" (Japanese: 偽兄弟先生)	Takao Nagaishi	Hirohisa Soda	November 16, 1990
39	"Please Love Me"; Transliteration: "Ai o Kudasai" (Japanese: 愛を下さい)	Takao Nagaishi	Toshiki Inoue	November 23, 1990
40	"Boy Majin Sword"; Transliteration: "Shōnen Majin Ken" (Japanese: 少年魔神剣)	Masao Minowa	Mami Watanabe	November 30, 1990
41	"Scary Date"; Transliteration: "Kowai Dēto" (Japanese: 恐いデート)	Masao Minowa	Kunio Fujii	December 7, 1990
42	"Kung Fu Spirit"; Transliteration: "Kan Fū Tamashii" (Japanese: カンフー魂)	Shohei Tojo	Hirohisa Soda	December 14, 1990
43	"TV Love"; Transliteration: "Terebi no Koi" (Japanese: テレビの恋)	Shohei Tojo	Hirohisa Soda	December 21, 1990
44	"Struggle Robot Battle"; Transliteration: "Shitō Robo Sen" (Japanese: 死闘ロボ戦)	Takao Nagaishi	Hirohisa Soda	January 11, 1991
45	"Rushing into the Enemy Base"; Transliteration: "Teki Kichi Totsunyū" (Japanese: 敵基地突入)	Takao Nagaishi	Hirohisa Soda	January 18, 1991
46	"The Whereabouts of Our Parents"; Transliteration: "Chichi Haha no Yukue" (Japanese: 父母(ちちはは)の行方)	Takao Nagaishi	Hirohisa Soda	January 25, 1991
47	"The Super Beast's Big Shedding"; Transliteration: "Chōjū Dai Dappi" (Japanese: 超獣大脱皮)	Shohei Tojo	Hirohisa Soda	February 1, 1991
Final	"Departure to the Stars"; Transliteration: "Hoshi he no Tabidachi" (Japanese: 星への旅立ち)	Shohei Tojo	Hirohisa Soda	February 8, 1991

== Cast ==
- Gaku Hoshikawa: Toshiya Fuji (藤 敏也, Fuji Toshiya)
- Ken Hoshikawa: Kei Shindachiya (信達谷 圭, Shindachiya Kei)
- Fumiya Hoshikawa: Ryouhei Kobayashi (小林 良平, Kobayashi Ryōhei)
- Kazumi Hoshikawa: Kazuko Miyata (宮田 かずこ, Miyata Kazuko)
- Remi Hoshikawa: Ryo Narushima (成嶋 涼, Narushima Ryō) (credited as Keiko Hayase (早瀬 恵子, Hayase Keiko)
- Doctor Hoshikawa: Kiyotaka Mitsugi (三ツ木 清隆, Mitsugi Kiyotaka)
- Midori Hoshikawa: Megumi Ishii (石井 めぐみ, Ishii Megumi)
- Gunther: Hideaki Kusaka (日下 秀昭, Kusaka Hideaki)
- Meadow: Chika Matsui (松井 千佳, Matsui Chika)
- Garoa: Takeshi Ishikawa (石川 武, Ishikawa Takeshi)
- Billion: Shunsaku Kudo (工藤 俊作, Kudō Shunsaku)
- Doldora: Hatsue Nishi (西 初恵, Nishi Hatsue)
- Zaza: Motoko Watanabe (渡辺 元子, Watanabe Motoko)
- Chevalier: Kihachirō Uemura (植村 喜八郎, Uemura Kihachirō)

=== Voice actors ===
- Arthur G6: Rica Matsumoto (松本 梨香, Matsumoto Rika)
- Meadow: Keiko Konno (金野 恵子, Konno Keiko)
- Dongoros: Takuzō Kamiyama (神山 卓三, Kamiyama Takuzō; 1–4), Osamu Katou (加藤 治, Katō Osamu; 5–48)
- Vulgyre: Seizō Katō (加藤 精三, Katō Seizō)
- Five-kun Dolls: Tomoko Hiratsuji (平辻 朝子, Hiratsuji Tomoko), Kotoe Taichi (太地 琴恵, Taichi Kotoe), Makoto Kōsaka (高坂 真琴, Kōsaka Makoto), Takeshi Kuwabara (桑原 たけし, Kuwabara Takeshi)
- Garoa-don: Hideyuki Umezu (梅津 秀行, Umezu Hideyuki), Keiko Itsumi (逸見 慶子, Itsumi Keiko; 24)
- Narration: Eiichi Onoda (小野田 英一, Onoda Eiichi)
- Sara: Youko Nakamura

=== Guest stars ===
- Yuriko: Youko Nakamura (35)

== Songs ==
Opening Theme

- "Chikyu Sentai Fiveman" (地球戦隊ファイブマン, Chikyū Sentai Faibuman)
  - Lyrics: Masao Urino
  - Composition: Yasuo Kosugi
  - Arrangement: Kenji Yamamoto
  - Artist: Kenji Suzuki (鈴木 けんじ, Suzuki Kenji)

Ending Theme

- "Fiveman, Ai no Thema" (ファイブマン、愛のテーマ, Faibuman, Ai no Tēma; "Fiveman, Theme of Love")
  - Lyrics: Masao Urino
  - Composition: Yasuo Kosugi
  - Arrangement: Kazuya Matsushita (松下 一也, Matsushita Kazuya)
  - Artist: Kenji Suzuki

== International broadcast and home video ==
- Fiveman was aired in France as the sixth Super Sentai series to air in the country on TV with a French dub produced and licensed by AB Groupe with dubbing work by Studio SOFI. It premiered on June 12, 1991, on TF1's Club Dorothée block. 23 episodes were actually dubbed, but only the first five episodes were aired on the network likely due to low interest as viewership declined towards the Super Sentai series in the region. With five being aired, it is the shortest series in the Super Sentai franchise to air in France to date.
- In Thailand, two Thai dubs are said to exist. One for Channel 7 where they used the original title and one for the home video released by Video Square where it was released under the international Sky Rangers title. As for Channel 7, the series aired on Fridays from 4:00 pm to 5:00 pm in 1993, but it did not air until the final episode.
- In the Philippines, the series was very popular and aired with a Tagalog dub on New Vision 9 from 1993 to 1994 and later re-aired with a new Tagalog dub was made for ABC and aired from 1999 to 2000.
- In Hong Kong (Formerly Called British Colonial Hong Kong A.K.A British Hong Kong), the series aired on TVB Jade with a Chinese, Including Cantonese dub on June 20, 1998, until February 13, 1999, As 地球戰隊五人組 (Dìqiú zhànduì wǔ rénzǔ) with all episodes being dubbed and broadcast.
- In Indonesia, the series was first dubbed in Indonesian and broadcast on RCTI and also later on Indosiar in 1998–1999.
- In North America, the series receive a DVD release by Shout! Factory on September 6, 2022, in the original Japanese audio with English subtitles, although it is only available sold exclusively on their website. This is the second Super Sentai series to be officially released on DVD that does not have a Power Rangers counterpart. The DVD was later released in other DVD retailers besides the Shout! Factory website on April 18, 2023.

== Appearances in Power Rangers ==
Despite never being directly adapted for a Power Rangers counterpart series, Five Yellow's suit was still adapted into the Power Rangers Megaforce episode "The Wrath" as the Yellow Supersonic Ranger. The entire Fiveman team appeared later in a comic story Power Rangers Supersonic which is in the Boom! Studios Power Rangers Year Two Deluxe Edition. In the story, the team is composed of Ace (Red Ranger), Star (Pink Ranger), Gent (Black Ranger), Pyre (Yellow Ranger), Brute (Blue Ranger) with a Green Ranger named Trek being added to the team. They are also aliens from the planet Xybria. Trek betrays the team and murders them. He would later become Psycho Green the first Psycho Ranger.
