= Kihachirō Uemura =

Japanese actor and voice actor

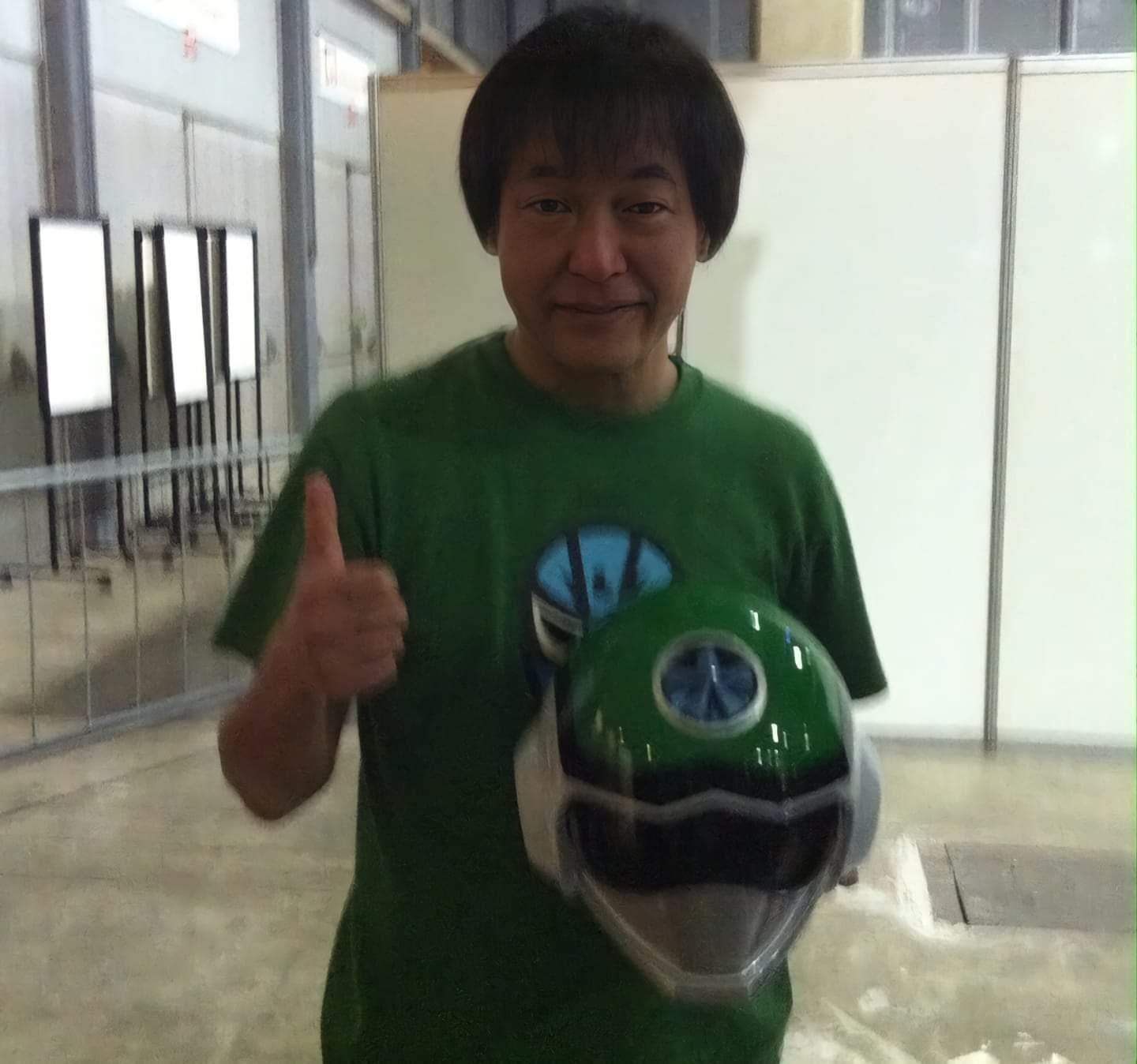
Kihachiro Uemura in 2020

Kihachirō Uemura (植村 喜八郎, Uemura Kihachirō) (born September 5, 1960) is a Japanese actor and voice actor.

Doraemon（1990）Nobi kasusasibi

== Tokusatsu ==
- Choushinsei Flashman (1986-1987) - Dai / Green Flash
- Chikyuu Sentai Fiveman (1990-1991) - First Captain Chevalier
- Cosmo Toushinden Gingaiger: Dark Commander () - Ginji / Gingablack
- Kaizoku Sentai Gokaiger (2012) - Dai / Green Flash
